= 2019 Campeonato Carioca =

Campeonato Carioca
- Season: 2019
- Dates: 22 December 2018 - 21 April 2019
- Champions: Flamengo
- Relegated: America; Goytacaz
- Copa do Brasil: Bangu; Fluminense; Vasco da Gama; Volta Redonda
- Série D: Bangu; Cabofriense
- Top goalscorer: Bruno Henrique (8 goals)

The 2019 Campeonato Carioca de Futebol was the 116th edition of the top division of football in the state of Rio de Janeiro. The competition was organized by FERJ. The top four teams in the final standings of the tournament not otherwise qualified qualified to compete in the 2020 Copa do Brasil. Additionally, the top two teams not competing in any level of the national Campeonato Brasileiro qualified for the 2020 Campeonato Brasileiro Série D. Botafogo were the defending champions. Flamengo won their record 35th Campeonato Carioca after defeating Vasco da Gama in the final.

== Participating teams ==
Location of teams in the 2019 Campeonato Carioca
Location of teams in the 2019 Campeonato Carioca – city of Rio de Janeiro

Club	Home City	Manager	2018 Result
America Football Club	Duque de Caxias (Note: Although America FC is headquartered in Mesquita, it played most home games at Los Larios Stadium)	Luisinho Lemos	1st (Série B1)
Americano Futebol Clube	Saquarema (Note: Although Americano FC is headquartered in Campos dos Goytacazes, it played most home games at Elcyr Resende Stadium)	Josué Teixeira	2nd (Série B1)
Bangu Atlético Clube	Rio de Janeiro (Bangu)	Alfredo Sampaio and Ado	8th
Boavista Sport Club	Saquarema	Eduardo Allax	5th
Botafogo de Futebol e Regatas	Rio de Janeiro (Engenho de Dentro) (Note: Although Botafogo FR is headquartered in Botafogo, it plays home games at Engenhão Stadium)	Zé Ricardo	1st
Associação Desportiva Cabofriense	Cabo Frio	Luciano Quadros and Valdir Bigode	7th
Clube de Regatas do Flamengo	Rio de Janeiro (Maracanã) (Note: Although CR Flamengo is headquartered in Lagoa, it plays home games at Maracanã Stadium)	Abel Braga	3rd
Fluminense Football Club	Rio de Janeiro (Maracanã) (Note: Although Fluminense FC is headquartered in Laranjeiras, it plays home games at Maracanã Stadium)	Fernando Diniz	4th
Goytacaz Futebol Clube	Campos dos Goytacazes	Athirson and Flávio Lopes	13th
Macaé Esporte Futebol Clube	Macaé	Luís Antônio Zaluar	12th
Madureira Esporte Clube	Rio de Janeiro (Madureira)	Antônio Carlos Roy	9th
Nova Iguaçu Futebol Clube	Nova Iguaçu	Marcelo Salles and Carlos Vitor	11th
Associação Atlética Portuguesa	Rio de Janeiro (Bangu) (Note: Although AA Portuguesa is headquartered on Governador Island, it played most home games at Moça Bonita Stadium)	João Carlos Ângelo and Ailton Ferraz	6th
Resende Futebol Clube	Resende	Edson Souza	14th
Club de Regatas Vasco da Gama	Rio de Janeiro (Vasco da Gama)	Alberto Valentim	2nd
Volta Redonda Futebol Clube	Volta Redonda	Toninho Andrade	10th

== Format ==
The competition maintained the format of the 2017 and 2018 editions. The preliminary phase of the tournament was contested as a round-robin among the two worst-placed teams of the 2018 competition, the two best-placed teams in the 2018 relegation group, and the two teams promoted from the 2018 Série B1. The top two teams of the preliminary phase qualified for the main competition while the remaining four competed in the relegation group.

In the main competition, the twelve clubs competed across two rounds in two groups of six. The first round was the Taça Guanabara. Each group contested a single round-robin and the two top-placed teams in each group qualified for the semi-finals of the Taça Guanabara. In the event of a draw, the higher-placed team would have advanced to the final. The Taça Guanabara final was contested as a single match with a penalty shoot-out in case of a draw after 90 minutes. The second round was the Taça Rio. The two groups of six remained the same, and each team faced all six teams of the opposite group once. Like the Taça Guanabara, the top two teams in each group qualified to a semi-final with the same format.

The Final Stage was contested as a four-team semifinal and final. The winning teams of the Taça Guanabara and Taça Rio qualified directly to the Final Stage. The best-placed teams in the overall group stage standings that did not win either round also qualified. The semi-finals were single-legged and the final was two-legged. In the event that the same team won both the Taça Guanabara and the Taça Rio, that team would have gone directly to the final. The four other best-placed teams in the overall group stage standings would have competed in a four-team single-match semifinal and final to face them.

== First round ==
Goytacaz and Resende qualified from the 2018 Campeonato Carioca relegation playoff. Nova Iguaçu and Macaé were the two lowest placed teams in the 2018 Campeonato Carioca main tournament. America and Americano were promoted from the 2018 Campeonato Carioca Série B1.

Pos	Team	Pld	W	D	L	GF	GA	GD	Pts	Qualification
1	Resende	5	3	2	0	6	3	+3	11	Championship round
2	Americano	5	3	1	1	6	3	+3	10	Championship round
3	America	5	2	2	1	4	3	+1	8	Relegation playoffs
4	Macaé	5	2	1	2	4	5	−1	7	Relegation playoffs
5	Nova Iguaçu	5	1	1	3	5	7	−2	4	Relegation playoffs
6	Goytacaz	5	0	1	4	3	7	−4	1	Relegation playoffs

Updated to match(es) played on 13 January 2019. Source: FERJ
Rules for classification: 1) points; 2) wins; 3) goal difference; 4) goals scored; 5) head-to-head results; 6) fewest red cards received; 7) fewest yellow cards received; 8) draw.

Home \ Away	AME	AMN	GOY	NIG	MAC	RES
América				1–1	1–0	1–1
Americano	1–0			2–1		
Goytacaz	0–1	1–1				
Nova Iguaçu			2–1			1–2
Macaé		0–2	2–1	1–0		
Resende		1–0	1–0		1–1	

Source: FERJ
Legend: Blue = home team win; Yellow = draw; Red = away team win.

== Championship round ==
=== Taça Guanabara ===
On the morning of 8 February, a fire erupted at the Ninho do Urubu youth training ground of Flamengo. The fire resulted in the deaths of ten people, mostly academy players between the ages of 14 and 16 training with the club. Three other people were injured, one of them seriously injured. The initial cause of the fire was suspected to be a malfunctioning air-conditioning unit that caught fire close to 5:00.

Most of the Rio clubs suspended all football activity the day of the tragedy. The governor of the state of Rio de Janeiro declared a three-day period of mourning following the tragedy. The two Taça Guanabara semifinal matches on the following days, including the match between Flamengo and Fluminense, were postponed.

Group A

Pos	Team	Pld	W	D	L	GF	GA	GD	Pts	Qualification
1	Vasco da Gama	5	5	0	0	9	2	+7	15	Advance to semifinals
2	Fluminense	5	3	1	1	12	3	+9	10	Advance to semifinals
3	Volta Redonda	5	3	1	1	8	8	0	10	
4	Americano	5	1	1	3	3	8	−5	4	
5	Madureira	5	0	2	3	2	8	−6	2	
6	Portuguesa	5	0	1	4	1	6	−5	1	

Source: FERJ
Rules for classification: 1) points; 2) wins; 3) goal difference; 4) goals scored; 5) head-to-head results; 6) least red cards received; 7) least yellow cards received; 8) draw.

Home \ Away	AMN	FLU	MAD	POR	VAS	VRE
Americano		0–4				1–2
Fluminense			4–0	3–1		1–1
Madureira	1–1				0–1	
Portuguesa	0–1		0–0		0–1	
Vasco da Gama	1–0	1–0				5–2
Volta Redonda			2–1	1–0		

Source: FERJ
Legend: Blue = home team win; Yellow = draw; Red = away team win.

Group B

Pos	Team	Pld	W	D	L	GF	GA	GD	Pts	Qualification
1	Flamengo	5	4	1	0	12	4	+8	13	Advance to semifinals
2	Resende	5	2	2	1	7	4	+3	8	Advance to semifinals
3	Bangu	5	2	1	2	4	5	−1	7	
4	Boavista	5	2	0	3	4	9	−5	6	
5	Botafogo	5	1	1	3	5	6	−1	4	
6	Cabofriense	5	1	1	3	4	8	−4	4	

Source: FERJ
Rules for classification: 1) points; 2) wins; 3) goal difference; 4) goals scored; 5) head-to-head results; 6) least red cards received; 7) least yellow cards received; 8) draw.

Home \ Away	BAN	BVT	BOT	CAB	FLA	RES
Bangu		2–0		1–0		
Boavista			0–3	1–0		2–1
Botafogo	0–0				1–2	0–1
Cabofriense			3–1			1–1
Flamengo	2–1	3–1		4–0		
Resende	3–0				1–1	

Source: FERJ
Legend: Blue = home team win; Yellow = draw; Red = away team win.

==== Knockout stage ====
Semifinals
1	Vasco da Gama	3
2	Resende	0
1	Flamengo	0
2	Fluminense	1

Final
1	Vasco da Gama	1
2	Fluminense	0

Semi-finals

13 February 2019
21:30 UTC−02:00

Vasco da Gama	3 – 0	Resende
Lucas Mineiro 15'; Lucão 35' (o.g.); Marrony 63'	Report

Maracanã, Rio de Janeiro
Attendance: 9,184
Referee: Rodrigo Nunes de Sá

14 February 2019
20:30 UTC−02:00

Flamengo	0 – 1	Fluminense
	Report	Luciano 90+3'

Maracanã, Rio de Janeiro
Attendance: 54,544
Referee: Rodrigo Carvalhães de Miranda

Final

17 February 2019
17:00 UTC−03:00

Vasco da Gama	1 – 0	Fluminense
Danilo Barcelos 81'	Report

Maracanã, Rio de Janeiro
Attendance: 29,002
Referee: Bruno Arleu de Araújo

Taça Guanabara
2019 champion

13th title

=== Taça Rio ===
Group A

Pos	Team	Pld	W	D	L	GF	GA	GD	Pts	Qualification
1	Fluminense	6	3	2	1	11	6	+5	11	Advance to semifinals
2	Vasco da Gama	6	2	2	2	7	6	+1	8	Advance to semifinals
3	Volta Redonda	6	2	2	2	5	6	−1	8	
4	Madureira	6	1	2	3	4	6	−2	5	
5	Portuguesa	6	1	1	4	5	14	−9	4	
6	Americano	6	0	2	4	3	12	−9	2	

Source: FERJ
Rules for classification: 1) points; 2) wins; 3) goal difference; 4) goals scored; 5) head-to-head results; 6) least red cards received; 7) least yellow cards received; 8) draw.

Group B

Pos	Team	Pld	W	D	L	GF	GA	GD	Pts	Qualification
1	Bangu	6	5	0	1	9	3	+6	15	Advance to semifinals
2	Flamengo	6	4	2	0	13	5	+8	14	Advance to semifinals
3	Cabofriense	6	3	2	1	10	4	+6	11	
4	Botafogo	6	2	3	1	10	7	+3	9	
5	Boavista	6	2	2	2	7	9	−2	8	
6	Resende	6	0	2	4	3	9	−6	2	

Source: FERJ
Rules for classification: 1) points; 2) wins; 3) goal difference; 4) goals scored; 5) head-to-head results; 6) least red cards received; 7) least yellow cards received; 8) draw.

Home \ Away	AMN	FLU	MAD	POR	VAS	VRE	BAN	BVT	BOT	CAB	FLA	RES
Americano									2–2	1–4		1–1
Fluminense									1–1	2–1		1–1
Madureira							0–1			0–0	0–2	
Portuguesa								1–1			1–3	2–1
Vasco da Gama							1–2	2–0			1–1	
Volta Redonda							0–1	2–4	1–0			
Bangu	2–0	0–2		3–0								
Boavista	1–0	0–3	1–1									
Botafogo			2–1	4–1	1–1							
Cabofriense				2–0	2–0	1–1						
Flamengo	4–1	3–2				0–0						
Resende			0–2		0–2	0–1						

Source: FERJ
Legend: Blue = home team win; Yellow = draw; Red = away team win.

==== Knockout stage ====
Semifinals
1	Bangu	0
2	Vasco da Gama	1
1	Fluminense	1
2	Flamengo	2

Final
2	Vasco da Gama	1 (1)
2	Flamengo	1 (3)

Semi-finals

28 March 2019
21:30 UTC−03:00

Bangu	0–1	Vasco da Gama
	Report	Tiago Reis 57'

Maracanã, Rio de Janeiro
Attendance: 19.884
Referee: Wagner do Nascimento Magalhães

27 March 2019
21:30 UTC−03:00

Fluminense	1–2	Flamengo
González 61' (pen.)	Report	Renê 30'; Éverton Ribeiro 90+5' (pen.)

Maracanã, Rio de Janeiro
Attendance: 24.614
Referee: Marcelo de Lima Henrique

Final

31 March 2019
16:00 UTC−03:00

Vasco da Gama	1–1	Flamengo
Tiago Reis 55'	Report	Giorgian De Arrascaeta 93'
Penalties
Danilo Barcelos (penalty scored); Rossi (penalty missed); Tiago Reis (penalty missed); Werley (penalty missed)	1 – 3	(penalty scored) Vitinho; (penalty missed) Rodinei; (penalty scored) Giorgian De Arrascaeta; (penalty scored) Fernando Uribe

Maracanã, Rio de Janeiro
Attendance: 38.787
Referee: Rodrigo Nunes de Sá

Taça Rio
2019 champion

8th title

== Relegation playoffs ==
The Relegation Round was played from 20 January to 24 February 2019 in a double round-robin format. The top two teams qualified for the First Round of the 2020 Campeonato Carioca and the bottom two teams were relegated to the 2019 Campeonato Carioca Série B1.

Pos	Team	Pld	W	D	L	GF	GA	GD	Pts	Relegation
1	Nova Iguaçu	6	4	0	2	7	3	+4	12	
2	Macaé	6	2	3	1	5	6	−1	9	
3	America (R)	6	2	2	2	6	6	0	8	Relegation to 2019 Série B1
4	Goytacaz (R)	6	1	1	4	5	8	−3	4	Relegation to 2019 Série B1

Source: FERJ
Rules for classification: 1) points; 2) wins; 3) goal difference; 4) number of goals scored; 5) head-to-head result.
(R) Relegated

Home \ Away	AME	GOY	MAC	NIG
America		3–2	0–0	0–1
Goytacaz	1–2		1–2	1–0
Macaé	1–1	0–0		0–4
Nova Iguaçu	1–0	1–0	0–2	

Source: FERJ
Legend: Blue = home team win; Yellow = draw; Red = away team win.

== Final stage ==
=== Overall table ===
Pos	Team	Pld	W	D	L	GF	GA	GD	Pts	Qualification or relegation
1	Flamengo (Q)	11	8	3	0	25	9	+16	27	Advance to Final Stage
2	Vasco da Gama (Q)	11	7	2	2	16	7	+9	23	Advance to Final Stage
3	Bangu (Q)	11	7	1	3	13	8	+5	22	Advance to Final Stage
4	Fluminense (Q)	11	6	3	2	23	9	+14	21	Advance to Final Stage
5	Volta Redonda	11	5	3	3	13	14	−1	18	
6	Cabofriense	11	4	3	4	14	12	+2	15	
7	Boavista	11	4	2	5	11	17	−6	14	
8	Botafogo	11	3	4	4	15	13	+2	13	
9	Resende	11	2	4	5	10	13	−3	10	
10	Madureira	11	1	4	6	6	14	−8	7	
11	Americano (R)	11	1	3	7	8	22	−14	6	2020 Campeonato Carioca First Round
12	Portuguesa (R)	11	1	2	8	6	20	−14	5	2020 Campeonato Carioca First Round

Source: FERJ
Rules for classification: 1) points; 2) goal difference; 3) number of goals scored.
(Q) Qualified to Final Stage; (R) Relegated

==== Knockout stage ====
Semifinals
1	Flamengo	1
4	Fluminense	1
3	Vasco da Gama	2
2	Bangu	1

Final
Flamengo	2	2	4
Vasco da Gama	0	0	0

Semi-finals

6 April 2019
19:00 UTC−03:00

Flamengo	1–1	Fluminense
Gabriel 70'	Report	Gilberto 45'

Maracanã, Rio de Janeiro
Attendance: 46,128
Referee: Bruno Arleu de Araújo

Flamengo advance to the finals with a draw as the higher seeded team.

7 April 2019
16:00 UTC−03:00

Vasco da Gama	2–1	Bangu
Bruno César 53'; Yan Sasse 60'	Report	Yaya Banhoro 57'

Maracanã, Rio de Janeiro
Attendance: 19,786
Referee: Rodrigo Carvalhaes de Miranda

Final

14 April 2019
16:00 UTC−03:00

Vasco da Gama	0–2	Flamengo
	Report	Bruno Henrique 54', 76'

Nilton Santos, Rio de Janeiro
Attendance: 10,854
Referee: Rodrigo Nunes de Sá

21 April 2019
16:00 UTC−03:00

Flamengo	2–0	Vasco da Gama
Willian Arão 16'; Vitinho 83'	Report

Maracanã, Rio de Janeiro
Attendance: 52,398
Referee: Rodrigo Carvalhaes

Campeonato Carioca
2019 champion

35th title

== Awards ==
=== Team of the year ===
Pos.	Player	Club
GK	(Brazil) Jefferson Paulino	Bangu
DF	(Brazil) Gilberto	Fluminense
DF	(Brazil) Leandro Castán	Vasco da Gama
DF	(Brazil) Rodrigo Caio	Flamengo
DF	(Brazil) Renê	Flamengo
MF	(Colombia) Gustavo Cuéllar	Flamengo
MF	(Brazil) Lucas Mineiro	Vasco da Gama
MF	(Brazil) Marcos Júnior	Bangu
MF	(Brazil) Éverton Ribeiro	Flamengo
FW	(Brazil) Bruno Henrique	Flamengo
FW	(Brazil) Gabriel Barbosa	Flamengo
HC	(Brazil) Fernando Diniz	Fluminense

Source FERJ
Last updated: 21 April 2019

2019 Campeonato Carioca Team of the Year

Award	Winner	Club
Player of the Year	(Brazil) Éverton Ribeiro	Flamengo
Revelation of the Year	(Brazil) Tiago Reis	Vasco da Gama
Coaching Revelation of the Year	(Brazil) Ado	Bangu

Source FERJ
Last updated: 22 April 2019

== Top scorers ==
As of 22 April 2019

Rank	Player	Club	Goals
1.	(Brazil) Bruno Henrique	Flamengo	8
2.	(Brazil) Anderson Lessa	Bangu	7
2.	(Brazil) Gabriel	Flamengo	7
2.	(Brazil) João Carlos	Volta Redonda	7
2.	(Brazil) Maxwell	Resende	7
2.	(Colombia) Yony González	Fluminense	7
3.	(Brazil) Luciano	Fluminense	6
4.	(Brazil) Marrony	Vasco da Gama	5
5.	(Brazil) Rincon	Cabofriense	4
5.	(Brazil) Romário	Americano	4
5.	(Brazil) Tiago Reis	Vasco da Gama	4
