= 2020 Campeonato Carioca =

Campeonato Carioca
- Season: 2020
- Dates: 22 December 2019 - 15 July 2020
- Champions: Flamengo (36th title)
- Relegated: Nova Iguaçu
- Copa do Brasil: Boavista; Botafogo; Madureira; Vasco da Gama; Volta Redonda
- Série D: Bangu; Boavista; Madureira
- Matches: 107
- Goals: 253 (2.36 per match)
- Top goalscorer: Gabriel; João Carlos (8 goals each)

The 2020 Campeonato Carioca de Futebol was the 117th edition of the top division of football in the state of Rio de Janeiro. The competition was organized by FERJ. It began on 22 December 2019 and ended on 15 July 2020. On 16 March 2020, FERJ suspended the Campeonato Carioca indefinitely due to the coronavirus pandemic in Brazil. The tournament resumed behind closed doors on 18 June 2020.

Flamengo, the defending champions, successfully defended their title after defeating Fluminense 3–1 on aggregate to win their 36th Campeonato Carioca title.

Taça Independência winners Volta Redonda, Torneio Extra winners Boavista and Torneio Extra runners-up Madureira qualified for 2021 Copa do Brasil. Since the Campeonato Carioca champion Flamengo and runner-up Fluminense both qualified for the 2021 Copa do Brasil through the 2020 Brasileirão, their Campeonato Carioca berths went to the next-best teams, Botafogo and Vasco da Gama. The top three teams not competing in any level of the national Campeonato Brasileiro, Bangu, Boavista and Madureira, qualified for the 2021 Campeonato Brasileiro Série D.

At the end of the tournament, only one club was relegated to 2020 Campeonato Carioca Série B1. Originally, the relegated team Nova Iguaçu obtained an injunction from the Rio de Janeiro State Court of Sports Justice (TJD/RJ) that guaranteed their presence in the first round of the 2021 Campeonato Carioca, but the Superior Court of Sports Justice (STJD) overturned the decision and Nova Iguaçu were relegated to 2020 Série B1.

== Participating teams ==
Location of teams in the 2020 Campeonato Carioca
Location of teams in the 2020 Campeonato Carioca – city of Rio de Janeiro

Club	Home City	Manager	2019 Result
America Football Club	Mesquita	Ney Barreto and Álvaro Gaia	2nd (Série B1)
Americano Futebol Clube	Cardoso Moreira (Note: Although Americano FC is headquartered in Campos dos Goytacazes, it played home games at Antônio Ferreira de Medeiros Stadium)	Rafael Soriano	11th
Bangu Atlético Clube	Rio de Janeiro (Bangu)	Eduardo Allax	3rd
Boavista Sport Club	Saquarema	Paulo Bonamigo	7th
Botafogo de Futebol e Regatas	Rio de Janeiro (Engenho de Dentro) (Note: Although Botafogo FR is headquartered in Botafogo, it plays home games at Engenhão Stadium)	Alberto Valentim and Paulo Autuori	8th
Associação Desportiva Cabofriense	Cabo Frio	Alfredo Sampaio and Luciano Quadros	6th
Clube de Regatas do Flamengo	Rio de Janeiro (Maracanã) (Note: Although CR Flamengo is headquartered in Lagoa, it plays home games at Maracanã Stadium)	Jorge Jesus	1st
Fluminense Football Club	Rio de Janeiro (Maracanã) (Note: Although Fluminense FC is headquartered in Laranjeiras, it plays home games at Maracanã Stadium)	Odair Hellmann	4th
Friburguense Atlético Clube	Nova Friburgo	Cadão	1st (Série B1)
Macaé Esporte Futebol Clube	Macaé	Mario Júnior and Charles de Almeida	14th
Madureira Esporte Clube	Rio de Janeiro (Madureira)	Toninho Andrade	10th
Nova Iguaçu Futebol Clube	Nova Iguaçu	Carlos Vitor and Hermes Júnior	13th
Associação Atlética Portuguesa	Rio de Janeiro (Governador)	Rogério Corrêa	12th
Resende Futebol Clube	Resende	Edson Souza and Sandro Sargentim	9th
Club de Regatas Vasco da Gama	Rio de Janeiro (Vasco da Gama)	Abel Braga and Ramon Menezes	2nd
Volta Redonda Futebol Clube	Volta Redonda	Luizinho Vieira	5th

== Format ==
The competition format was similar to the previous three editions but with some alterations to each stage.

=== First round ===
The preliminary phase of the tournament was contested as a single round-robin among the two worst-placed teams of the 2019 competition, the two best-placed teams in the 2019 relegation group, and the two teams promoted from the 2019 Série B1. The top two teams of the preliminary phase qualified for the main competition while the remaining four competed in the relegation round.

=== Relegation round ===
Unlike the previous format, only one team participating in the Campeonato Carioca would be relegated. The four lowest placed teams in the preliminary round formed Group X and played a double round-robin. The first placed team would avoid relegation and qualify for the preliminary phase of the 2021 Campeonato Carioca. The remaining three teams formed Group Z and played another double round-robin. The lowest placed team would be relegated to the 2020 Campeonato Carioca Série B1.

=== Taça Guanabara and Taça Rio ===
In the main competition, the twelve clubs competed across two rounds in two groups of six. The first round was the Taça Guanabara and the second round was the Taça Rio. The two rounds swapped formats from the 2019 Campeonato Carioca.

In the Taça Guanabara, each team faced all six teams of the opposite group once. The two top-placed teams in each group qualified for the semi-final of the Taça Guanabara. In the event of a draw, the higher placed team would advance to the final. The Taça Guanabara semi-final and final were both single-legged. In case of a draw in the final, the match would go directly to a penalty shootout.

In the Taça Rio, each group contested a single round-robin within their group. The top two teams in each group qualified to a semi-final with the same format as the Taça Guanabara.

=== Final ===
The final stage was contested solely between two teams, as opposed to the four-team bracket of previous seasons. The winners of the Taça Guanabara and Taça Rio played a two-legged final. If tied on aggregate goals after both legs, the final would have been decided in a penalty shootout. If the same club had won both the Taça Guanabara and Taça Rio, and no other team had collected more points than this team across both group stages combined, then this team would immediately be champion of the Campeonato Carioca. Otherwise, the team that won both cups and the team with the most points would have played a two-legged final. In the case of a draw on aggregate, the championship would go to the team that won both cups.

=== Taça Independência and Torneio Extra ===
The top two teams in the combined table of the Taça Guanabara and Taça Rio automatically qualified to the 2021 Copa do Brasil. Additionally, the best-placed team in the combined table that is not one of the "Big Four" of Rio de Janeiro (Botafogo, Flamengo, Fluminense, Vasco da Gama) won the Taça Independência (Independence Cup) and also qualified to the 2021 Copa do Brasil.

Originally, the four teams — excluding the "Big Four" and Taça Independência winners — with the best overall performance (only considering matches against non-Big Four teams) would compete in the Torneio Extra (Extra Tournament): a single-elimination semi-finals and final bracket, with the winner receiving a berth to the 2021 Copa do Brasil. However the Torneio Extra was cancelled and the best seeded team was declared the winner. Since the 2020 Copa Rio was also cancelled, its 2021 Copa do Brasil berth was awarded to the Torneio Extra runners-up (i.e. the second best seeded team).

== First round ==
Nova Iguaçu and Macaé qualified from the 2019 Campeonato Carioca relegation playoff. Americano and Portuguesa were the two lowest placed teams in the 2019 Campeonato Carioca main tournament. Friburguense and America were promoted from the 2019 Campeonato Carioca Série B1. The First round was contested from 22 December 2019 to 11 January 2020.

Pos	Team	Pld	W	D	L	GF	GA	GD	Pts	Qualification
1	Portuguesa	5	3	2	0	10	5	+5	11	Championship round
2	Macaé	5	2	1	2	6	6	0	7	Championship round
3	Americano	5	2	1	2	3	4	−1	7	Group X
4	Nova Iguaçu	5	2	0	3	9	7	+2	6	Group X
5	America	5	1	3	1	4	6	−2	6	Group X
6	Friburguense	5	1	1	3	1	5	−4	4	Group X

Source: FERJ
Rules for classification: 1) points; 2) wins; 3) goal difference; 4) goals scored; 5) head-to-head results; 6) disciplinary record; 7) random draw.

Home \ Away	AME	AMO	FRI	MAC	NIG	POR
America				3–1		1–1
Americano	0–0			1–0		
Friburguense	0–0	1–0				0–2
Macaé			1–0		2–0	2–2
Nova Iguaçu	4–0	1–2	2–0			
Portuguesa		2–0			3–2	

Source: FERJ
Legend: Blue = home team win; Yellow = draw; Red = away team win.

== Taça Guanabara ==
The Taça Guanabara group stage was contested from 18 January to 9 February.

=== Group A ===
Pos	Team	Pld	W	D	L	GF	GA	GD	Pts	Qualification
1	Boavista	6	4	1	1	9	3	+6	13	Advance to semi-finals
2	Flamengo	6	4	1	1	9	4	+5	13	Advance to semi-finals
3	Botafogo	6	3	0	3	6	8	−2	9	
4	Portuguesa	6	2	0	4	7	9	−2	6	
5	Bangu	6	1	3	2	3	7	−4	6	
6	Cabofriense	6	1	0	5	3	10	−7	3	

Source: FERJ
Rules for classification: 1) points; 2) wins; 3) goal difference; 4) goals scored; 5) head-to-head results; 6) disciplinary record; 7) random draw.

=== Group B ===
Pos	Team	Pld	W	D	L	GF	GA	GD	Pts	Qualification
1	Fluminense	6	5	0	1	12	2	+10	15	Advance to semi-finals
2	Volta Redonda	6	4	0	2	11	5	+6	12	Advance to semi-finals
3	Madureira	6	3	1	2	5	5	0	10	
4	Vasco da Gama	6	2	1	3	4	5	−1	7	
5	Resende	6	1	2	3	6	9	−3	5	
6	Macaé	6	1	1	4	3	11	−8	4	

Source: FERJ
Rules for classification: 1) points; 2) wins; 3) goal difference; 4) goals scored; 5) head-to-head results; 6) disciplinary record; 7) random draw.

Home \ Away	BAN	BOA	BOT	CAB	FLA	POR	FLU	MAC	MAD	RES	VAS	VRE
Bangu							1–5	1–0				0–1
Boavista									3–1		0–1	2–1
Botafogo								3–1		2–1	1–0	
Cabofriense							0–1		0–1	2–3		
Flamengo							0–1		2–0			3–2
Portuguesa								4–1		1–0	2–3	
Fluminense		0–1	3–0			2–0						
Macaé		0–3		1–0	0–0							
Madureira	0–0		2–0			1–0						
Resende	1–1	0–0			1–3							
Vasco da Gama	0–0			0–1	0–1							
Volta Redonda			1–0	4–0		2–0						

Source: FERJ
Legend: Blue = home team win; Yellow = draw; Red = away team win.

=== Knockout stage ===
Semi-finals
1	Boavista	1
2	Volta Redonda	1
1	Fluminense	2
2	Flamengo	3

Final
1	Boavista	1
2	Flamengo	2

Semi-finals

16 February 2020
16:00 UTC−03:00

Boavista	1–1	Volta Redonda
Caio Dantas 28'	Report	Marcelo 79' (pen.)

Elcyr Resende, Saquarema
Attendance: 3,277
Referee: Rodrigo Carvalhães de Miranda

12 February 2020
20:30 UTC−03:00

Fluminense	2–3	Flamengo
Luccas Claro 60'; Evanilson 70'	Report	Bruno Henrique 2'; Gabriel 8'; Filipe Luís 49'

Maracanã, Rio de Janeiro
Attendance: 59,025
Referee: Grazianni Maciel Rocha

Final

The home team was decided in a draw held on 14 February 2020 at FERJ headquarters in Rio de Janeiro.

22 February 2020
18:00 UTC−03:00

Boavista	1–2	Flamengo
Jean 5'	Report	Diego 43'; Gabriel 79'

Maracanã, Rio de Janeiro
Attendance: 58,219
Referee: Marcelo de Lima Henrique

2020 Taça Guanabara champions
Flamengo
22nd title

== Taça Rio ==
The Taça Rio group stage was contested from 28 February to 2 July.

=== Group A ===
Pos	Team	Pld	W	D	L	GF	GA	GD	Pts	Qualification
1	Flamengo	5	5	0	0	14	2	+12	15	Advance to semi-finals
2	Botafogo	5	2	2	1	9	7	+2	8	Advance to semi-finals
3	Boavista	5	2	1	2	5	5	0	7	
4	Bangu	5	2	1	2	4	6	−2	7	
5	Portuguesa	5	1	2	2	5	4	+1	5	
6	Cabofriense	5	0	0	5	4	17	−13	0	

Source: FERJ
Rules for classification: 1) points; 2) wins; 3) goal difference; 4) goals scored; 5) head-to-head results; 6) disciplinary record; 7) random draw.

Home \ Away	BAN	BOA	BOT	CAB	FLA	POR
Bangu				1–0	0–3	1–0
Boavista	2–1			2–0		
Botafogo	1–1	2–1		6–2		
Cabofriense					1–4	1–4
Flamengo		2–0	3–0			2–1
Portuguesa		0–0	0–0			

Source: FERJ
Legend: Blue = home team win; Yellow = draw; Red = away team win.

=== Group B ===
Pos	Team	Pld	W	D	L	GF	GA	GD	Pts	Qualification
1	Fluminense	5	3	1	1	11	4	+7	10	Advance to semi-finals
2	Volta Redonda	5	3	1	1	7	3	+4	10	Advance to semi-finals
3	Vasco da Gama	5	2	2	1	5	4	+1	8	
4	Madureira	5	2	0	3	6	9	−3	6	
5	Resende	5	1	1	3	4	8	−4	4	
6	Macaé	5	1	1	3	2	7	−5	4	

Source: FERJ
Rules for classification: 1) points; 2) wins; 3) goal difference; 4) goals scored; 5) head-to-head results; 6) disciplinary record; 7) random draw.

Home \ Away	FLU	MAC	MAD	RES	VAS	VRE
Fluminense			5–1	4–0		0–3
Macaé	0–0		0–3			
Madureira				0–2		2–1
Resende		0–1			1–1	
Vasco da Gama	0–2	3–1	1–0			
Volta Redonda		1–0		2–1	0–0	

Source: FERJ
Legend: Blue = home team win; Yellow = draw; Red = away team win.

=== Knockout stage ===
Semi-finals
1	Fluminense	0
2	Botafogo	0
1	Flamengo	2
2	Volta Redonda	0

Final
1	Fluminense (p)	1 (3)
1	Flamengo	1 (2)

Semi-finals

5 July 2020
16:00 UTC−03:00

Fluminense	0–0	Botafogo
	Report

Nilton Santos, Rio de Janeiro
Attendance: 0
Referee: Wagner do Nascimento Magalhães

5 July 2020
16:00 UTC−03:00

Flamengo	2–0	Volta Redonda
Bruno Henrique 21', 49'	Report

Maracanã, Rio de Janeiro
Attendance: 0
Referee: Grazianni Maciel Rocha

Final

The home team was decided in a draw held on 6 July 2020 at FERJ headquarters in Rio de Janeiro.

8 July 2020
21:30 UTC−03:00

Fluminense	1–1	Flamengo
Gilberto 36'	Report	Pedro 77'
Penalties
Nenê (penalty scored); Dodi (penalty missed); Hudson (penalty scored); Araújo (penalty missed); Pacheco (penalty scored)	3–2	(penalty scored) Gabriel; (penalty missed) Willian Arão; (penalty missed) Léo Pereira; (penalty scored) Pedro; (penalty missed) Rafinha

Maracanã, Rio de Janeiro
Attendance: 0
Referee: Bruno Arleu de Araújo

2020 Taça Rio champions
Fluminense
4th title

== Final stage ==
=== Final ===
Flamengo (winners of the Taça Guanabara) and Fluminense (winners of the Taça Rio) played the final on a home-and-away two-legged basis. As the finalist with more points in the overall table, Flamengo earned the right to choose the order of the legs. Flamengo chose to be the home team in the second leg.

12 July 2020
16:00 UTC−03:00

Fluminense	1–2	Flamengo
Evanilson 60'	Report	Pedro 28'; Michael 73'

Maracanã, Rio de Janeiro
Attendance: 0
Referee: Wagner do Nascimento Magalhães

15 July 2020
21:00 UTC−03:00

Flamengo	1–0	Fluminense
Vitinho 90+4'	Report

Maracanã, Rio de Janeiro
Attendance: 0
Referee: Grazianni Maciel Rocha

2020 Campeonato Carioca champions
Flamengo
36th title

=== Overall table ===
The last-placed team of the overall table was "relegated" to the first round of the 2021 Campeonato Carioca. The "relegated" team Cabofriense originally obtained an injunction from the TJD/RJ that guaranteed their presence in the 2021 Campeonato Carioca Championship Round, but the STJD overturned the decision and Cabofriense were relegated to 2021 First Round.

Pos	Team	Pld	W	D	L	GF	GA	GD	Pts	Qualification
1	Flamengo (B)	11	9	1	1	23	6	+17	28	Third round of the 2021 Copa do Brasil
2	Fluminense (B)	11	8	1	2	23	6	+17	25	Third round of the 2021 Copa do Brasil
3	Volta Redonda (I)	11	7	1	3	18	8	+10	22	First round of the 2021 Copa do Brasil
4	Boavista (E)	11	6	2	3	14	8	+6	20	2021 Campeonato Brasileiro Série D and First round of the 2021 Copa do Brasil
5	Botafogo	11	5	2	4	15	15	0	17	First round of the 2021 Copa do Brasil
6	Madureira (E)	11	5	1	5	11	14	−3	16	2021 Campeonato Brasileiro Série D and First round of the 2021 Copa do Brasil
7	Vasco da Gama	11	4	3	4	9	9	0	15	First round of the 2021 Copa do Brasil
8	Bangu	11	3	4	4	7	13	−6	13	2021 Campeonato Brasileiro Série D
9	Portuguesa	11	3	2	6	12	13	−1	11	
10	Resende	11	2	3	6	10	17	−7	9	
11	Macaé	11	2	2	7	5	18	−13	8	
12	Cabofriense	11	1	0	10	7	27	−20	3	First round of the 2021 Campeonato Carioca

Source: FERJ
Rules for classification: 1) points; 2) wins; 3) goal difference; 4) goals scored; 5) head-to-head results; 6) disciplinary record; 7) random draw.
(B) Qualified for the third round of the 2021 Copa do Brasil through the 2020 Campeonato Brasileiro Série A; (E) Qualified for 2021 Copa do Brasil through the Torneio Extra; (I) Qualified for 2021 Copa do Brasil through the Taça Independência

== Torneio Extra ==
As best-placed team in the overall table, excluding the "Big Four", Volta Redonda won the Taça Independência and qualified for the 2021 Copa do Brasil.

The four teams, excluding the "Big Four" and Taça Independência winners, with the best performance in the tournament (excluding matches against the "Big Four" teams) would compete in the Torneio Extra (Extra Tournament) for a berth to the 2021 Copa do Brasil, but the Torneio Extra was cancelled. The best seeded team, Boavista, was declared winners and qualified for the 2021 Copa do Brasil. As the 2020 Copa Rio was cancelled, the Torneio extra runners-up, Madureira, also qualified for the 2021 Copa do Brasil.

Semi-finals
1	Boavista (awd.)	—
4	Portuguesa	—
2	Madureira (awd.)	—
3	Bangu	—

Final
1	Boavista (awd.)	—
2	Madureira	—

== Relegation Round ==
The Relegation Round was played from 18 January to 4 July in two separate double round-robin groups. The top team of Group X qualified for the First Round of the 2021 Campeonato Carioca and the bottom three contested the Group Z relegation group. The last-placed team of Group Z was relegated to the 2020 Série B1. The top two teams of Group Z qualified for the preliminary round of the 2021 Campeonato Carioca.

Nova Iguaçu was relegated to 2020 Campeonato Carioca Série B1. They originally obtained an injunction from the TJD/RJ that guaranteed their presence in the first round of the 2021 Campeonato Carioca, but the STJD overturned the decision and Nova Iguaçu were relegated to 2020 Série B1.

=== Group X ===
Pos	Team	Pld	W	D	L	GF	GA	GD	Pts	Qualification
1	Friburguense	6	3	2	1	10	8	+2	11	First round of the 2021 Campeonato Carioca
2	Americano	6	3	1	2	9	7	+2	10	Group Z
3	America	6	1	3	2	11	10	+1	6	Group Z
4	Nova Iguaçu	6	1	2	3	5	10	−5	5	Group Z

Source: FERJ
Rules for classification: 1) points; 2) wins; 3) goal difference; 4) number of goals scored; 5) head-to-head result.

Home \ Away	AME	AMO	FRI	NIG
America		4–0	2–2	1–2
Americano	2–0		1–2	0–0
Friburguense	2–2	1–2		1–0
Nova Iguaçu	2–2	0–4	1–2	

Source: FERJ
Legend: Blue = home team win; Yellow = draw; Red = away team win.

=== Group Z ===
Pos	Team	Pld	W	D	L	GF	GA	GD	Pts	
1	Americano	4	3	0	1	5	4	+1	9	First round of the 2021 Campeonato Carioca
2	America	4	2	1	1	5	2	+3	7	First round of the 2021 Campeonato Carioca
3	Nova Iguaçu (R)	4	0	1	3	3	7	−4	1	Relegation to 2020 Campeonato Carioca Série B1

Source: FERJ
Rules for classification: 1) points; 2) wins; 3) goal difference; 4) number of goals scored; 5) head-to-head result.
(R) Relegated

Home \ Away	AME	AMO	NIG
America		0–1	1–1
Americano	0–2		2–1
Nova Iguaçu	0–2	1–2	

Source: FERJ
Legend: Blue = home team win; Yellow = draw; Red = away team win.

== Awards ==
=== 2020 Campeonato Carioca Team ===
Pos.	Player	Club
GK	(Brazil) Douglas Borges	Volta Redonda
DF	(Brazil) Rafinha	Flamengo
DF	(Brazil) Rodrigo Caio	Flamengo
DF	(Brazil) Marcelo Benevenuto	Botafogo
DF	(Brazil) Jean/ (Brazil) Filipe Luís	Boavista/Flamengo
MF	(Brazil) Gerson	Flamengo
MF	(Brazil) Éverton Ribeiro	Flamengo
MF	(Brazil) Nenê	Fluminense
FW	(Brazil) Gabriel	Flamengo
FW	(Brazil) João Carlos	Volta Redonda
FW	(Brazil) Bruno Henrique	Flamengo
HC	(Brazil) Odair Hellmann/ (Portugal) Jorge Jesus	Fluminense/Flamengo

Source:FERJ

2020 Campeonato Carioca Team

Award	Winner	Club
Best player	(Brazil) Gabriel	Flamengo

Source:FERJ

== Top goalscorers ==
Rank	Player	Club	Goals
1	(Brazil) Gabriel	Flamengo	8
1	(Brazil) João Carlos	Volta Redonda	8
3	(Brazil) Caio Dantas	Boavista	7
4	(Argentina) Germán Cano	Vasco da Gama	6
4	(Brazil) Nenê	Fluminense	6
6	(Brazil) Adriano	Portuguesa	5
6	(Brazil) Bruno Henrique	Flamengo	5
6	(Brazil) Evanilson	Fluminense	5
6	(Brazil) Matheus Babi	Macaé	5
6	(Brazil) Pedro	Flamengo	5
6	(Brazil) Saulo Mineiro	Volta Redonda	5

Source:FERJ
