= Jacó (footballer) =

Brazilian footballer (born 1996)

Personal information
- Full name: Carlos Alberto Guimarães Filho
- Date of birth: 27 February 1996 (age 30)
- Place of birth: Campos dos Goytacazes, Brazil
- Height: 1.82 m (6 ft 0 in)
- Position: Striker

Team information
- Current team

Youth career
- 2011–2015: Bahia

Senior career*
| Years | Team | Apps | (Gls) |
| 2014–2017 | Bahia | 11 | (2) |
| 2016 | → Cuiabá (loan) | | |
| 2016–2017 | → Fluminense Feira (loan) | | |
| 2017 | CSA | 17 | (3) |
| 2017 | Oborishte | 7 | (2) |
| 2018 | Anapolina | 15 | (4) |
| 2018–2019 | Goiás | 7 | (0) |
| 2019 | → Juazeirense (loan) | 5 | (0) |
| 2019 | → Serra Macaense (loan) | 14 | (4) |
| 2020 | Iporá | 10 | (2) |
| 2020 | York United | | |
| 2020 | Grêmio Anápolis | | |
| 2021 | Rio Branco | 7 | (0) |
| 2021–2022 | Masfout | 25 | (12) |
| 2022–2023 | Al-Taawon | 30 | (14) |
| 2023–2024 | Al-Shabab Manama | | |
| 2024 | Al-Riffa | | |
| 2024 | Al-Arabi | 4 | (0) |
| 2024–2025 | Quang Nam | | |
| 2025 | Rio Branco | | |
| 2025–2026 | Emirates | | |
- * Club domestic league appearances and goals

Carlos Alberto Guimarães Filho (born 27 February 1996), commonly known as Jacó, is a Brazilian professional footballer who plays as a striker.

== Career ==
=== Goiás ===
On 4 April 2018, Jacó signed with Série B side Goiás. That year, he made seven appearances in Série B and one start in the Copa do Brasil against Grêmio. He also made five appearances and scored one goal at the U23 level for Goiás in the Campeonato Brasileiro de Aspirantes.

==== Loan to Juazeirense ====
At the beginning of 2019, Jacó went on loan with Série D side Juazeirense. He made five appearances in the Campeonato Baiano and appeared in one Copa do Brazil match against Vasco da Gama.

==== Loan to Serra Macaense ====
In May 2019, Jacó was loaned to Campeonato Carioca Série B1 side Serra Macaense. He scored four goals in fourteen appearances in league play for Macaense and made two appearances in the Copa Rio.

=== Iporá ===
On 19 January 2020, Jacó signed with Campeonato Goiano side Iporá. That season, he scored one goal in eight appearances.

=== York9 ===
On 4 March 2020, Jacó signed with Canadian Premier League side York9. On 27 July, Jacó and York9 agreed to the mutual termination of his contract as he was unable to travel to Canada due to the COVID-19 pandemic.

=== Grêmio Anápolis ===
On 3 December 2020, Jacó signed with Campeonato Goiano side Grêmio Anápolis.

=== Quang Nam ===
On 11 September 2024, Jacó joined V.League 1 club Quang Nam.

== Career statistics ==
As of 4 March 2020

Appearances and goals by club, season and competition
| Club | Season | League | | | National cup (Note: Includes appearances in the Copa do Brasil, Copa do Nordeste, Bulgarian Cup and Copa Rio.) | | Continental | | Other (Note: Includes appearances in the Campeonato Baiano and Campeonato Alagoano.) | | Total | |
| Club | Season | Division | Apps | Goals | Apps | Goals | Apps | Goals | Apps | Goals | Apps | Goals |
|---|---|---|---|---|---|---|---|---|---|---|---|---|
| Bahia | 2014 | Série A | 1 | 0 | 0 | 0 | — | | 0 | 0 | 1 | 0 |
| Bahia | 2015 | Série B | 7 | 2 | 1 | 0 | 0 | 0 | 0 | 0 | 8 | 2 |
| Bahia | 2016 | Série B | 0 | 0 | 1 | 0 | — | | 3 | 0 | 4 | 0 |
| Bahia | Total | | 8 | 2 | 2 | 0 | 0 | 0 | 3 | 0 | 13 | 2 |
| CSA | 2017 | Série C | 0 | 0 | 4 | 1 | — | | 13 | 2 | 17 | 3 |
| Oborishte | 2017–18 | Bulgarian Second League | 7 | 2 | 1 | 0 | — | | 0 | 0 | 8 | 2 |
| Anapolina | 2017 | Campeonato Goiano 2 | 15 | 4 | 0 | 0 | — | | 0 | 0 | 15 | 4 |
| Goiás | 2018 | Série B | 7 | 0 | 1 | 0 | — | | 0 | 0 | 8 | 0 |
| Juazeirense (loan) | 2019 | Série D | 0 | 0 | 1 | 0 | — | | 5 | 0 | 6 | 0 |
| Serra Macaense (loan) | 2019 | Campeonato Carioca B1 | 14 | 4 | 2 | 0 | — | | 0 | 0 | 16 | 4 |
| Iporá | 2020 | Campeonato Goiano 2 | 8 | 1 | 0 | 0 | — | | 0 | 0 | 8 | 1 |
| Career total | | | 59 | 13 | 11 | 1 | 0 | 0 | 21 | 2 | 91 | 16 |
