= 2014 Campeonato Brasileiro Série C =

Sportseason of a football competition

Campeonato Brasileiro Série C
- Season: 2014
- Champions: Macaé
- Promoted: CRB; Macaé; Mogi Mirim; Paysandu
- Relegated: São Caetano; Treze; CRAC; Duque de Caxias
- Top goalscorer: Ytalo (Guaratinguetá) - 12 goals
- Biggest home win: Tupi 5–0 Mogi Mirim (7 September); Guaratinguetá 5–0 Madureira (4 October)
- Biggest away win: Guarani 1–5 Guaratinguetá (26 May)
- Highest attendance: 35,050; Paysandu 3–3 Macaé (22 November)
- Lowest attendance: 19; Cuiabá 0–0 Salgueiro (25 May)

The Serie C of the Brazilian Championship 2014 is a football competition held in Brazil, equivalent to the third division. It is contested by 20 clubs.

== Teams ==
Location of teams in 2014 Série C

Team	Home city
Águia de Marabá	Marabá
ASA	Arapiraca
Botafogo-PB	João Pessoa
Caxias	Caxias do Sul
CRAC	Catalão
CRB	Maceió
Cuiabá	Cuiabá
Duque de Caxias	Duque de Caxias
Fortaleza	Fortaleza
Guarani	Campinas
Guaratinguetá	Guaratinguetá
Juventude	Caxias do Sul
Macaé	Macaé
Madureira	Rio de Janeiro
Mogi Mirim	Mogi Mirim
Paysandu	Belém
Salgueiro	Salgueiro
São Caetano	São Caetano do Sul
Treze	Campina Grande
Tupi	Juiz de Fora

=== Number of teams by state ===
Number of teams	State	Team(s)
4	São Paulo	Guarani, Guaratinguetá, Mogi Mirim and São Caetano
3	Rio de Janeiro	Duque de Caxias, Macaé and Madureira
2	Alagoas	ASA and CRB
2	Pará	Águia de Marabá and Paysandu
2	Paraíba	Botafogo and Treze
2	Rio Grande do Sul	Caxias and Juventude
1	Ceará	Fortaleza
1	Goiás	CRAC
1	Mato Grosso	Cuiabá
1	Minas Gerais	Tupi
1	Paraíba	Botafogo
1	Pernambuco	Salgueiro

== League table ==
=== Group A ===
Pos	Team	Pld	W	D	L	GF	GA	GD	Pts
1	(Ceará) Fortaleza (Q)	18	9	8	1	23	11	+12	35
2	(Alagoas) CRB (Q)	18	7	6	5	23	17	+6	27
3	(Pernambuco) Salgueiro (Q)	18	7	6	5	20	22	−2	27
4	(Pará) Paysandu (Q)	18	7	5	6	21	17	+4	26
5	(Alagoas) ASA	18	7	4	7	23	22	+1	25
6	(Paraíba) Botafogo	18	6	7	5	20	19	+1	25
7	(Mato Grosso) Cuiabá	18	6	5	7	19	19	0	23
8	(Pará) Águia de Marabá	18	5	5	8	21	25	−4	20
9	(Paraíba) Treze (R)	18	4	7	7	19	25	−6	19
10	(Goiás) CRAC (R)	18	2	7	9	14	26	−12	10 (Note: CRAC was punished by the STJD with the deduction of three points for fielding an ineligible player.)

(Q) Qualified for the phase indicated; (R) Relegated

=== Group B ===
Pos	Team	Pld	W	D	L	GF	GA	GD	Pts
1	(Minas Gerais) Tupi (Q)	18	9	7	2	30	13	+17	34
2	(São Paulo (state)) Mogi Mirim (Q)	18	9	4	5	22	24	−2	31
3	(Rio de Janeiro (state)) Madureira (Q)	18	7	5	6	20	17	+3	26
4	(Rio de Janeiro (state)) Macaé (Q)	18	7	5	6	15	17	−2	26
5	(São Paulo (state)) Guaratinguetá	18	6	7	5	32	18	+14	25
6	(Rio Grande do Sul) Juventude	18	6	7	5	16	14	+2	25
7	(São Paulo (state)) Guarani	18	5	9	4	14	15	−1	24
8	(Rio Grande do Sul) Caxias	18	5	7	6	17	20	−3	22
9	(São Paulo (state)) São Caetano (R)	18	6	3	9	13	19	−6	21
10	(Rio de Janeiro (state)) Duque de Caxias (R)	18	1	4	13	10	32	−22	7

(Q) Qualified for the phase indicated; (R) Relegated

== Final stage ==
Quarter-finals
(Rio de Janeiro (state)) Macaé (a)	0	1	1
(Ceará) Fortaleza	0	1	1
(Rio de Janeiro (state)) Madureira	1	0	1
(Alagoas) CRB	2	2	4
(Pará) Paysandu	2	1	3
(Minas Gerais) Tupi	1	0	1
(Pernambuco) Salgueiro	0	0	0
(São Paulo (state)) Mogi Mirim	1	0	1

Semi-finals
(Rio de Janeiro (state)) Macaé	4	0	4
(Alagoas) CRB	0	0	0
(Pará) Paysandu	4	1	5
(São Paulo (state)) Mogi Mirim	1	2	3

Finals
(Rio de Janeiro (state)) Macaé (a)	1	3	4
(Pará) Paysandu	1	3	4

=== Finals ===
November 15, 2014
17:00 UTC−2

Macaé	1–1	Paysandu
João Carlos 61'	Report	Yago Pikachu 85'

Moacyrzão, Macaé
Attendance: 7,436
Referee: Edmundo Alves do Nascimento

November 22, 2014
17:00 UTC−2

Paysandu	3–3	Macaé
Zé Antônio 17'; Ruan 51'; Rômulo 67'	Report	João Carlos 43', 58'; Diego 75'

Mangueirão, Belém
Attendance: 35,050
Referee: Manoel Nunes Lopo Garrido
