= João Carlos (footballer, born 1987) =

Brazilian footballer (born 1987)

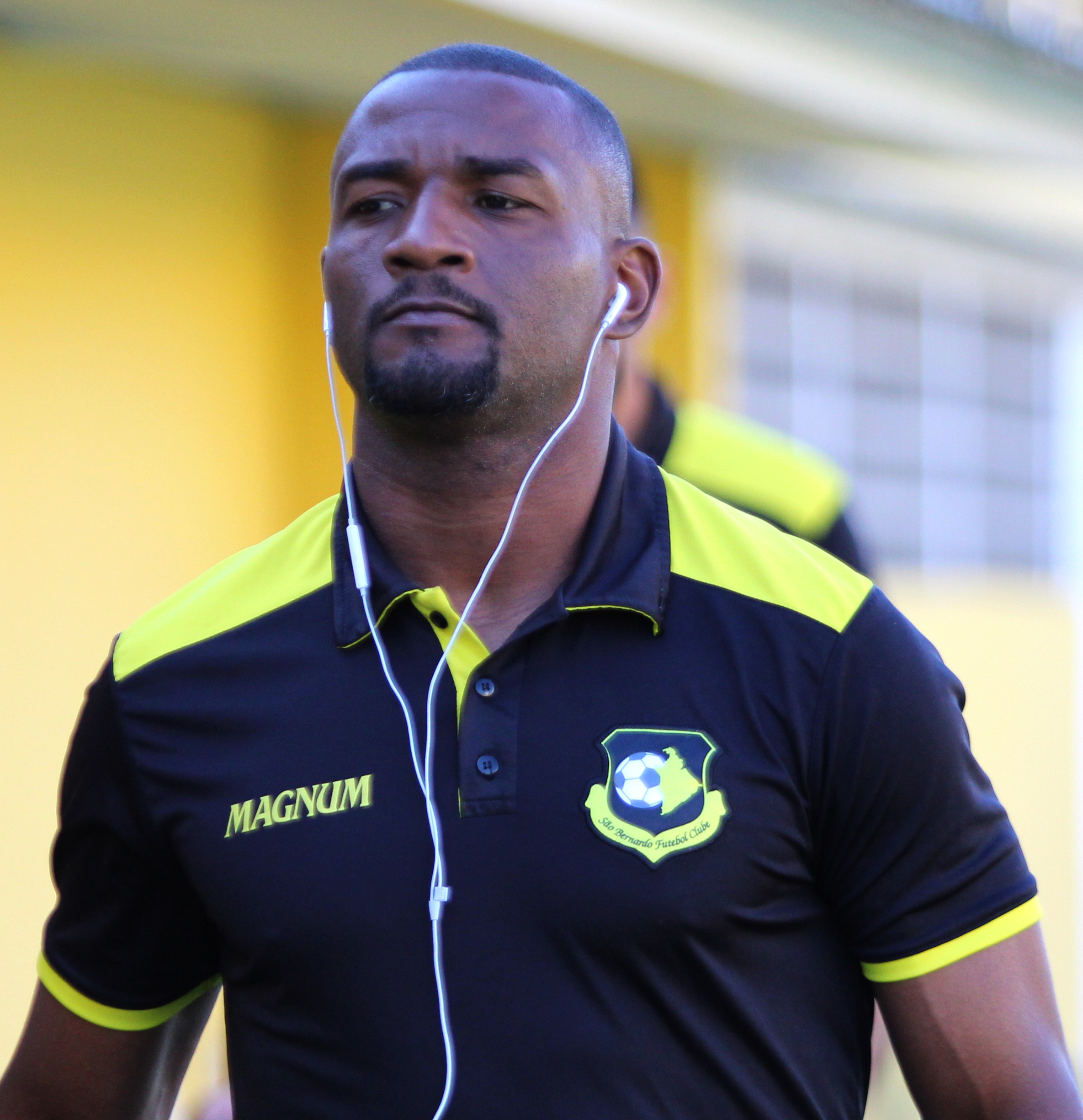
- João Carlos in 2022

Personal information
- Full name: João Carlos de Castro Ferreira
- Date of birth: 12 February 1987 (age 39)
- Place of birth: Duque de Caxias, Brazil
- Height: 1.82 m (6 ft 0 in)
- Position: Forward

Team information
- Current team: São Bernardo
- Number: 11

Youth career
- Tigres do Brasil

Senior career*
Years	Team	Apps	(Gls)
2006	Arraial do Cabo		
2007–2008	Duque de Caxias		
2008	→ Resende (loan)	2	(0)
2008	→ America-RJ (loan)	0	(0)
2008–2011	Arraial do Cabo	21	(12)
2009	→ Metropolitano (loan)	0	(0)
2009	→ Mesquita (loan)	3	(1)
2010	→ CF Rio de Janeiro (loan)	6	(10)
2010	→ José Bonifácio (loan)	5	(1)
2012–2013	Duque de Caxias	25	(5)
2014	Macaé	37	(14)
2015–2018	Madureira	46	(14)
2016–2017	→ Cuiabá (loan)	1	(0)
2018	→ Cuiabá (loan)	17	(5)
2019–2021	Volta Redonda	60	(30)
2020	→ Mirassol (loan)	10	(6)
2021	→ São Bernardo (loan)	8	(3)
2021–	São Bernardo	38	(7)
- * Club domestic league appearances and goals as of 21:55, 16 February 2023 (UTC)

João Carlos de Castro Ferreira (born 12 February 1987), known as João Carlos, is a Brazilian footballer who plays as a forward for São Bernardo.

== Club career ==
Born in Duque de Caxias, Rio de Janeiro, João Carlos began his career in the youth sides of Tigres do Brasil, but left the side to work in a sawmill in his hometown. After nearly quitting football, he made his senior debut with Arraial do Cabo in 2006, and was known as João Moreno at the time.

João Carlos subsequently played for Duque de Caxias, Resende and America-RJ before returning to Arraial in 2008, where he impressed enough to earn a trial at South African side Golden Arrows in August of that year. On 27 January 2009, he moved to Metropolitano, but was separated from the squad in less than a month after arriving.

João Carlos subsequently signed for Mesquita, but finished the 2009 season back at Arraial. In 2010, as Arraial did not field a senior squad, he played for CF Rio de Janeiro and José Bonifácio.

João Carlos was a spotlight of Arraial during the 2012 Campeonato Carioca Série C, and returned to Duque for the 2012 Série C. On 4 December 2013, he agreed to a deal with Macaé, and was the club's top scorer as they won the 2014 Série C.

Ahead of the 2015 season, João Carlos joined Madureira, where he featured regularly. On 21 April 2016, he was announced at Cuiabá on loan, but only played twice before fracturing his tibia in the following month.

After recovering in the middle of 2017, João Carlos played for Madureira before returning to Cuiabá in 2018, also on loan. Now a regular starter, he helped the side to achieve promotion before signing for Volta Redonda on 11 December 2018.

On 23 July 2020, João Carlos renewed his contract with Voltaço until 2022, but was loaned to Mirassol on 2 December.

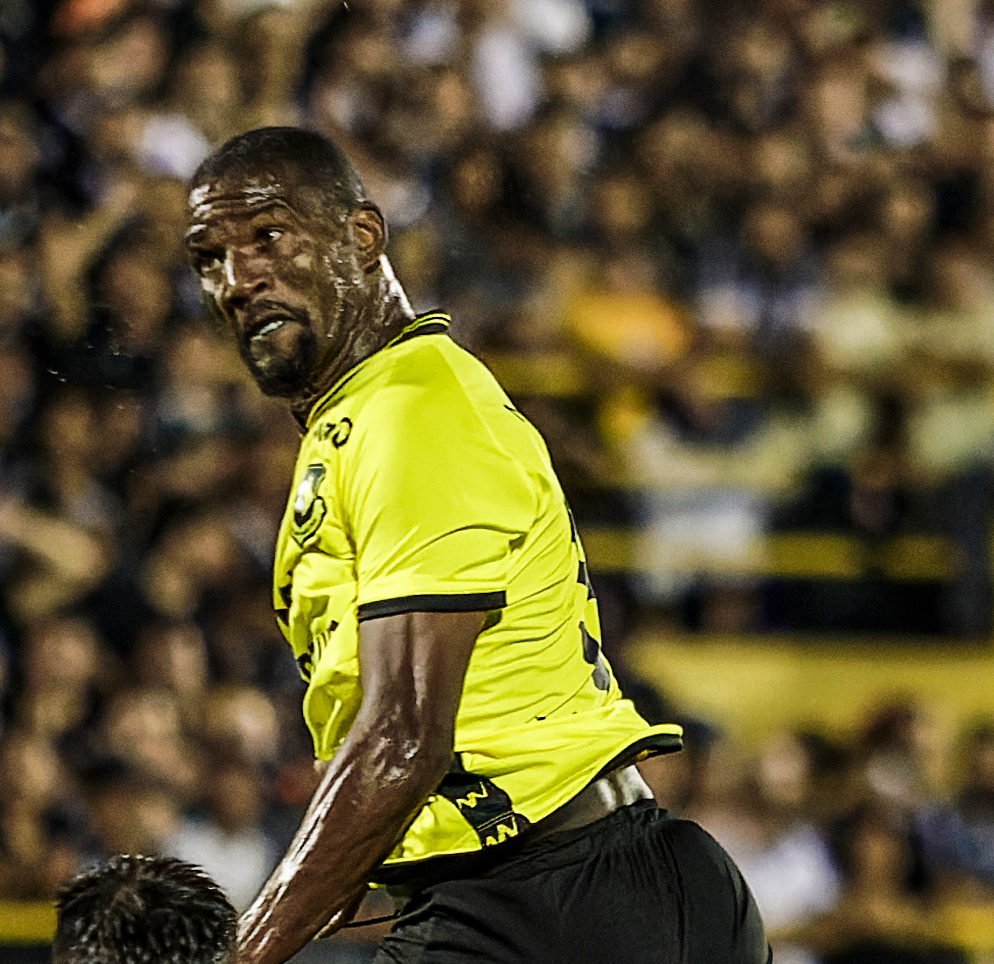
João Carlos with São Bernardo in 2023

On 12 May 2021, João Carlos was loaned to São Bernardo for the latter stages of the year's Campeonato Paulista Série A2. After achieving promotion, he terminated his contract with Volta Redonda on 21 July 2021, and returned to São Bernardo for the 2021 Copa Paulista.

Regularly used for Bernô, João Carlos won the 2021 Copa Paulista with the side and achieved promotion from the 2022 Série D. On 22 October 2022, aged 35, he renewed his contract for a further year.

== Career statistics ==
As of 16 February 2023

Club	Season	League			State League		Cup		Continental		Other		Total	
Club	Season	Division	Apps	Goals	Apps	Goals	Apps	Goals	Apps	Goals	Apps	Goals	Apps	Goals
Resende	2008	Carioca	—		2	0	—		—		—		2	0
America-RJ	2008	Carioca	—		0	0	—		—		5 (Note: Appearance(s) in Copa Rio)	0	5	0
Arraial do Cabo	2008	Carioca Série C	—		8	6	—		—		—		8	6
Arraial do Cabo	2009	Carioca Série C	—		6	2	—		—		—		6	2
Arraial do Cabo	2011	Carioca Série C	—		0	0	—		—		—		0	0
Arraial do Cabo	2012	Carioca Série C	—		7	4	—		—		—		7	4
Arraial do Cabo	Total		—		21	12	—		—		—		21	12
Metropolitano (loan)	2009	Catarinense	—		0	0	—		—		—		0	0
Mesquita (loan)	2009	Carioca	—		3	1	—		—		—		3	1
CF Rio de Janeiro (loan)	2010	Carioca Série C	—		6	10	—		—		—		6	10
José Bonifácio (loan)	2010	Paulista 2ª Divisão	—		5	1	—		—		—		5	1
Duque de Caxias	2012	Série C	10	0	—		—		—		2	1	12	1
Duque de Caxias	2013	Série C	11	5	4	0	—		—		8	2	23	7
Duque de Caxias	Total		21	5	4	0	—		—		10	3	35	8
Macaé	2014	Série C	23	8	14	6	—		—		6	4	43	18
Madureira	2015	Série C	17	8	10	1	1	1	—		6	1	34	11
Madureira	2016	Série D	0	0	13	4	—		—		—		13	4
Madureira	2017	Carioca	—		0	0	—		—		2	0	2	0
Madureira	2018	Série D	0	0	6	1	0	0	—		—		6	1
Madureira	Total		17	8	29	6	1	1	—		8	1	55	16
Cuiabá (loan)	2016	Série C	1	0	—		1	0	—		—		2	0
Cuiabá (loan)	2018	Série C	17	5	—		—		—		—		17	5
Volta Redonda	2019	Série C	10	2	11	7	—		—		—		21	9
Volta Redonda	2020	Série C	15	8	12	8	1	0	—		—		28	16
Volta Redonda	2021	Série C	0	0	12	5	2	0	—		—		14	5
Volta Redonda	Total		25	10	35	20	3	0	—		—		63	30
Mirassol (loan)	2020	Série D	10	6	—		—		—		—		10	6
São Bernardo	2021	Paulista A2	—		8	3	—		—		12 (Note: Appearance(s) in Copa Paulista)	4	20	7
São Bernardo	2022	Série D	20	4	9	1	—		—		—		29	5
São Bernardo	2023	Série C	0	0	9	2	0	0	—		—		9	2
São Bernardo	Total		20	4	26	6	0	0	—		12	4	58	14
Career total			134	46	145	62	5	1	0	0	41	12	325	121

== Honours ==
=== Club ===
Duque de Caxias

- Copa Rio: 2013

Macaé

- Campeonato Brasileiro Série C: 2014

Mirassol

- Campeonato Brasileiro Série D: 2020

São Bernardo

- Copa Paulista: 2021

=== Individual ===
- Campeonato Carioca top goalscorer: 2020 (8 goals, shared with Gabriel Barbosa)
