= Diego Corrêa =

Brazilian footballer (born 1983)

Personal information
- Full name: Diego Pereira Corrêa
- Date of birth: 18 September 1983 (age 43)
- Place of birth: Macaé, Brazil
- Height: 1.70 m (5 ft 7 in)
- Position: Left-back

Youth career
- 1996: Macaé
- 1996–2003: Vasco da Gama

Senior career*
Years	Team	Apps	(Gls)
2004	→ Olaria (loan)		
2004–2007	Vasco da Gama	100	(4)
2007	→ Goiás (loan)	19	(2)
2008	Vasco da Gama		
2008	Figueirense	3	(0)
2010	Macaé		
2010	Bahia	10	(1)
2011	Mirassol	5	(0)
2011–2014	São Caetano	98	(3)
2014–2016	Macaé	51	(3)
2016–2018	CRB	82	(0)
2018	Mirassol		
2019	América RN	0	(0)
- * Club domestic league appearances and goals

Diego Pereira Corrêa (born 18 September 1983), is a Brazilian former professional footballer who played as a left-back. In March 2019, Diego Corrêa tested positive for benzoylecgonine, a metabolite of cocaine and was provisionally suspended by the Brazilian Anti-Doping Authority (ABCD).

== Honours ==
Macaé

- Campeonato Brasileiro Série C: 2014
