= Bruno Henrique (footballer, born 1990) =

Brazilian footballer

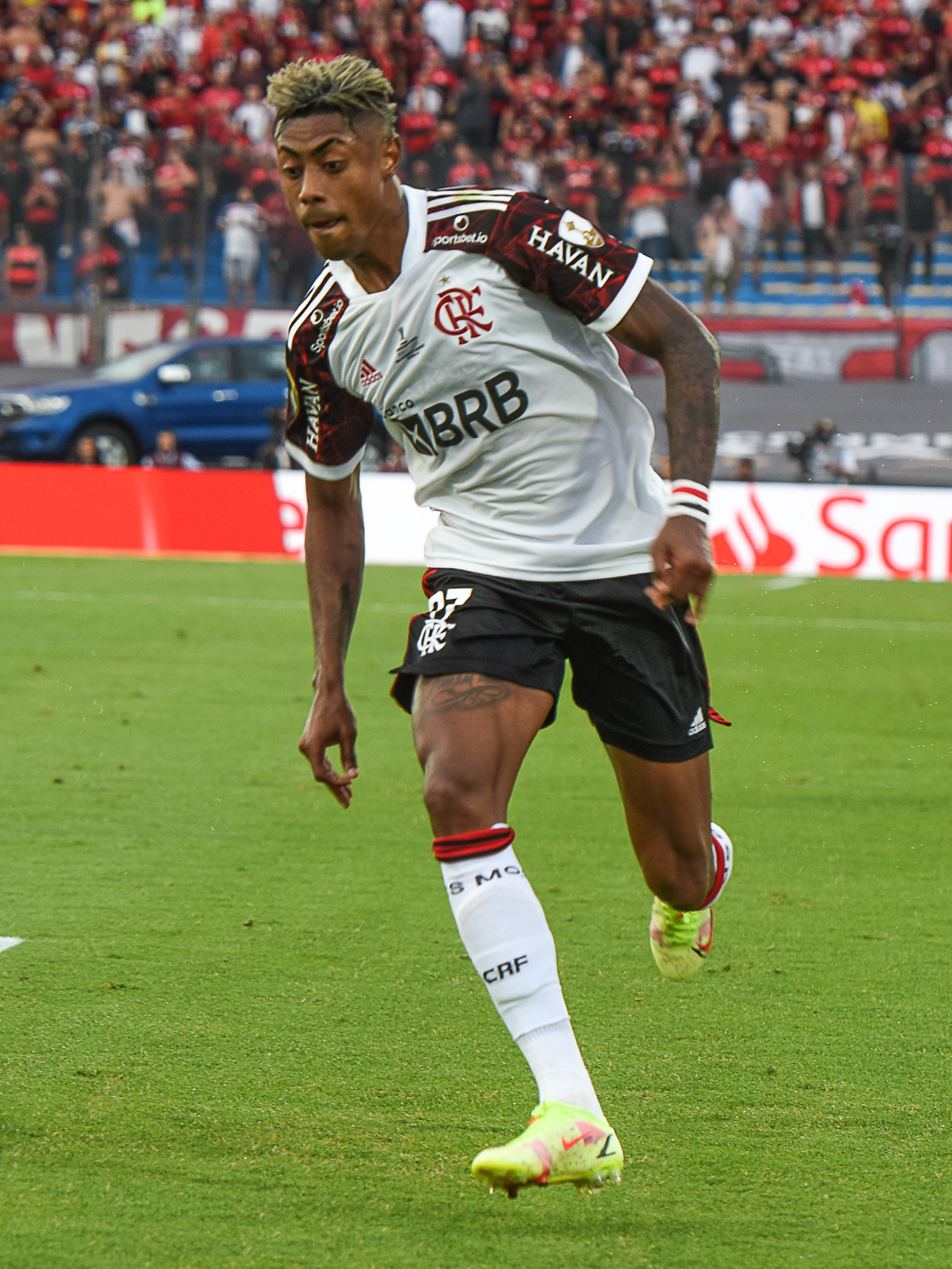
- Bruno Henrique in 2021

Personal information
- Full name: Bruno Henrique Pinto
- Date of birth: 30 December 1990 (age 35)
- Place of birth: Belo Horizonte, Brazil
- Height: 1.83 m (6 ft 0 in)
- Positions: Winger; forward

Team information
- Current team: Flamengo
- Number: 27

Senior career*
| Years | Team | Apps | (Gls) |
| 2012–2013 | Cruzeiro | 0 | (0) |
| 2012–2013 | → Uberlândia (loan) | 8 | (0) |
| 2014 | Uberlândia | 12 | (5) |
| 2014 | → Itumbiara (loan) | 12 | (7) |
| 2015 | Goiás | 49 | (12) |
| 2016–2017 | VfL Wolfsburg | 14 | (0) |
| 2017–2019 | Santos | 69 | (12) |
| 2019– | Flamengo | 274 | (81) |

International career^{‡}
| 2019 | Brazil | 2 | (0) |
- * Club domestic league appearances and goals as of 21 November 2026 ‡ National team caps and goals as of 11 September 2019

Bruno Henrique Pinto (born 30 December 1990), known as Bruno Henrique, is a Brazilian footballer who plays as a winger for Campeonato Brasileiro Série A club Flamengo.

He made his Campeonato Brasileiro Série A debut with Goiás in 2015. Then he moved to Germany, where he made just 17 appearances in a year with VfL Wolfsburg before returning home to Santos for €4 million. In January 2019, he moved to Flamengo for a fee of R$23 million, and won the Campeonato Carioca, Brazilian Serie A and Libertadores Cup in his first year, ending as top scorer in the first and voted The Best of the tournament in the last, being the first in the history of the Libertadores to be rewarded with a 18k gold and diamonds ring.

Bruno Henrique made his senior international debut for Brazil in 2019.

== Club career ==
=== Early career ===
Born in Belo Horizonte, Minas Gerais, Bruno Henrique joined Cruzeiro after being named the best player of the 2012 Copa Itatiaia (an amateur competition in the state) while playing for Inconfidência FC. He made his senior debuts while on loan at Uberlândia in 2012, and after another loan stint at the club, signed a permanent deal in late 2013, after recovering from an Achilles tendon rupture, as his contract with Cruzeiro had expired.

In July 2014 Bruno Henrique was loaned to Itumbiara. He scored seven goals in only 12 matches for the side, including braces against América-GO and Iporá.

=== Goiás ===
After scoring seven goals for Itumbiara, Bruno Henrique moved to Goiás on 7 January 2015. He made his debut for the club late in the month by starting in a 2–2 Campeonato Goiano home draw against Trindade, and scored his first goal on 4 February in a 3–1 away win against CRAC.

Bruno Henrique made his Série A debut on 10 May, starting in a 0–0 away draw against Vasco. He scored his first goals in the category six days later, netting his team's all goals in a 2–0 home win against Atlético Paranaense.

=== Wolfsburg ===
Bruno Henrique moved abroad for the first time in his career on 29 January 2016, joining Bundesliga club VfL Wolfsburg. He made his debut in the category on 6 February, coming on as a second half substitute for Max Kruse in a 3–0 away loss against FC Schalke 04.

Bruno Henrique made his UEFA Champions League debut on 6 April 2016, starting and assisting Maximilian Arnold's second goal in a 2–0 home win against Real Madrid; he also started in the second leg six days later, a 3–0 loss at the Santiago Bernabéu Stadium which knocked his side out of the competition.

=== Santos ===
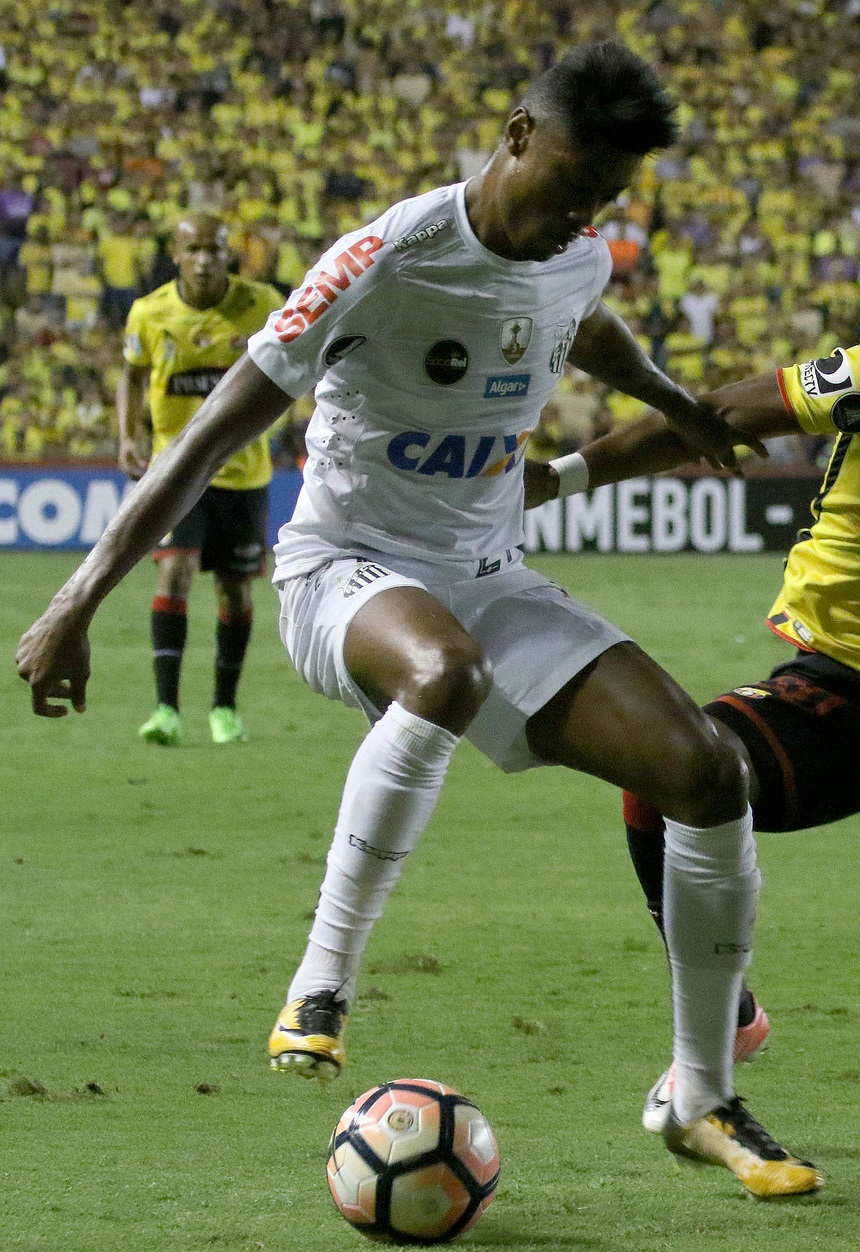
Bruno Henrique playing for Santos in 2017.

On 23 January 2017, Bruno Henrique joined Santos back in his home country, after an € 4 million offer was accepted by Wolfsburg. He was officially announced at his new club four days later, signing a four-year contract.

Bruno Henrique made his debut for the club on 12 February 2017, coming on as a second-half substitute in a 3–2 Campeonato Paulista away win against Red Bull Brasil. He scored his first goals on 12 March, netting a hat-trick in a 4–1 away routing of São Bernardo FC.

On 23 July 2017, Bruno Henrique scored all his team's goals in a 3–0 home defeat of Bahia. He finished the season with 18 goals and 11 assists, being best of his team in both attributes.

Bruno Henrique only played for ten minutes during the first match of the 2018 season before suffering an eye injury which kept him out for three months.

=== Flamengo ===
On 23 January 2019, Bruno Henrique agreed to a deal with fellow top tier club Flamengo, for a rumoured fee of R$23 million, plus Jean Lucas on loan to Santos for one year.

In the 2019 Campeonato Carioca, Bruno Henrique finished as top scorer with eight goals, six of them as braces in Clássicos against the state's other heavyweights, Botafogo, Fluminense and Vasco da Gama. The last of these was on 14 April in a 2–0 away win in the first leg of the final, which Fla won 4–0 on aggregate.

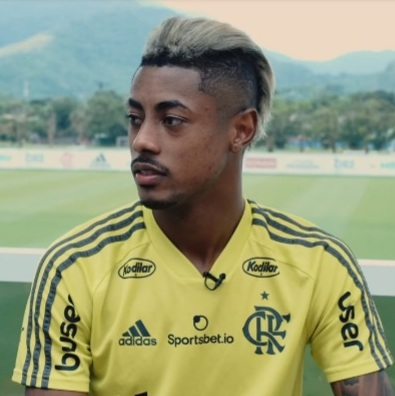
Bruno Henrique with Flamengo in 2019

On Bruno Henrique's Série A debut for Flamengo on 22 April, he scored twice in a 3–1 home comeback win over his former team, Cruzeiro, who had not lost in 2019. By late October in the end stages of the national championship, Bruno Henrique and strike partner Gabriel Barbosa had 60 goals over the year, more than five whole Série A teams. On 3 November, he scored a hat-trick in a 4–1 win over Corinthians at the Maracanã Stadium.

Bruno Henrique scored five goals in the 2019 Copa Libertadores, which his club won for the second time in their history. In the quarter-final against compatriots Internacional, he scored both goals in the first leg and assisted Gabriel Barbosa's equaliser in the second, for the Rubro-Negro to make the last four for the first time in 35 years. In the final on 23 November in Lima, Peru, Flamengo won 2–1 with a late comeback against River Plate. Deep into added time, Bruno Henrique was kicked while on the floor by opponent Exequiel Palacios, who was sent off, while Gabriel Barbosa was also dismissed for applauding the decision. He was named Player of the Tournament by CONMEBOL.

At the 2019 FIFA Club World Cup in Qatar, Flamengo finished as runners-up to Liverpool. Bruno Henrique scored in the semi-finals as the team came from behind to win 3–1 against Asian champions Al Hilal of Saudi Arabia.

On 6 January 2024, Bruno Henrique extended his contract with Flamengo until December 2026. On April 27, 2025, Bruno completed 300 games with the Flamengo shirt in a 4–0 victory over Corinthians. Later that year, he achieved his third Copa Libertadores title with his club following a 1–0 win over Palmeiras in the final, matching the competition's record for most wins held by Fabiano Eller, Palhinha, Ronaldo Luiz, Marcos Rocha, Willian and Felipe Melo.

== International career ==
Coach Tite called up Bruno Henrique to the Brazil squad in August 2019 for friendlies against Colombia and Peru in the United States. He debuted against the former at the Hard Rock Stadium in Miami on 6 September, replacing Philippe Coutinho for the last ten minutes of a 2–2 draw.

== Personal life ==
Bruno Henrique's older brother, Juninho, is also a footballer and a forward. Both played together at Uberlândia in 2013.

== Style of play ==
Described as "a complete player" by former coach Jorge Jesus, Bruno Henrique is most well known for his acceleration and pace, being considered one of the fastest strikers in the world. He is usually deployed as a winger or a striker in the left side of the attack, where he uses his dribbling technique and speed to beat opponents in one-on-one situations.

Since joining Flamengo in 2019, Bruno Henrique has been dubbed "Rei dos Clássicos" ("King of derbies") for often scoring against local rivals Vasco da Gama, Fluminense and Botafogo.

== Career statistics ==
=== Club ===
As of match played 21 November 2026

Appearances and goals by club, season and competition
| Club | Season | League | | | State league (Note: Includes Campeonato Mineiro Módulo II, Campeonato Goiano Segunda Divisão, Campeonato Goiano, Campeonato Paulista, Campeonato Carioca) | | National cup (Note: Includes Copa do Brasil, DFB-Pokal) | | Continental | | Other | | Total | |
| Club | Season | Division | Apps | Goals | Apps | Goals | Apps | Goals | Apps | Goals | Apps | Goals | Apps | Goals |
|---|---|---|---|---|---|---|---|---|---|---|---|---|---|---|
| Uberlândia | 2012 | Mineiro Módulo II | — | | 1 | 0 | — | | — | | 9 (Note: Appearances in Taça Minas Gerais) | 4 | 10 | 4 |
| Uberlândia | 2013 | Mineiro Módulo II | — | | 7 | 0 | — | | — | | — | | 7 | 0 |
| Uberlândia | 2014 | Mineiro Módulo II | — | | 12 | 5 | — | | — | | — | | 12 | 5 |
| Uberlândia | Total | | — | | 20 | 5 | — | | — | | 9 | 4 | 29 | 9 |
| Itumbiara (loan) | 2014 | Goiano 2ª Divisão | — | | 12 | 7 | — | | — | | — | | 12 | 7 |
| Goiás | 2015 | Série A | 33 | 7 | 16 | 5 | 6 | 0 | 2 (Note: Appearances in Copa Sudamericana) | 0 | — | | 57 | 12 |
| VfL Wolfsburg | 2015–16 | Bundesliga | 7 | 0 | — | | 0 | 0 | 2 (Note: Appearances in UEFA Champions League) | 0 | 0 | 0 | 9 | 0 |
| VfL Wolfsburg | 2016–17 | Bundesliga | 7 | 0 | — | | 1 | 0 | — | | — | | 8 | 0 |
| VfL Wolfsburg | Total | | 14 | 0 | — | | 1 | 0 | 2 | 0 | 0 | 0 | 17 | 0 |
| Santos | 2017 | Série A | 28 | 8 | 12 | 3 | 4 | 4 | 9 (Note: Appearances in Copa Libertadores) | 3 | — | | 53 | 18 |
| Santos | 2018 | Série A | 28 | 1 | 1 | 0 | 2 | 1 | 2 | 0 | — | | 33 | 2 |
| Santos | Total | | 56 | 9 | 13 | 3 | 6 | 5 | 11 | 3 | — | | 86 | 20 |
| Flamengo | 2019 | Série A | 33 | 21 | 11 | 8 | 3 | 0 | 13 | 5 | 2 (Note: Appearances in FIFA Club World Cup) | 1 | 62 | 35 |
| Flamengo | 2020 | Série A | 31 | 9 | 10 | 5 | 4 | 1 | 6 | 4 | 2 (Note: One appearance and one goal in Recopa Sudamericana, one appearance and one goal in Supercopa do Brasil) | 2 | 53 | 21 |
| Flamengo | 2021 | Série A | 24 | 11 | 7 | 1 | 5 | 2 | 11 | 6 | 1 (Note: Appearance in Supercopa do Brasil) | 0 | 48 | 20 |
| Flamengo | 2022 | Série A | 8 | 1 | 7 | 0 | 1 | 0 | 6 | 1 | 1 | 1 | 23 | 3 |
| Flamengo | 2023 | Série A | 29 | 2 | — | | 5 | 2 | 4 | 3 | — | | 38 | 7 |
| Flamengo | 2024 | Série A | 29 | 6 | 13 | 2 | 6 | 1 | 8 | 0 | — | | 56 | 9 |
| Flamengo | 2025 | Série A | 32 | 8 | 7 | 3 | 1 | 0 | 13 | 1 | 8 (Note: One appearance and two goals in Supercopa do Brasil, four appearances and one goal in FIFA Club World Cup, three appearances in FIFA Intercontinental Cup) | 3 | 61 | 15 |
| Flamengo | 2026 | Série A | 29 | 2 | 4 | 2 | 2 | 0 | 11 | 5 | 2 (Note: One appearance in Supercopa do Brasil, one appearance in Recopa Sudamericana) | 0 | 48 | 9 |
| Flamengo | Total | | 215 | 60 | 59 | 21 | 27 | 6 | 72 | 25 | 16 | 7 | 389 | 119 |
| Career total | | | 301 | 74 | 113 | 38 | 35 | 10 | 87 | 28 | 24 | 9 | 590 | 167 |

=== International ===
As of match played 10 September 2019

Appearances and goals by national team and year
| National team | Year | Apps | Goals |
|---|---|---|---|
| Brazil | 2019 | 2 | 0 |
| Total | | 2 | 0 |

== Honours ==
Goiás

- Campeonato Goiano: 2015

Flamengo

- FIFA Challenger Cup: 2025
- FIFA Derby of the Americas: 2025
- Copa Libertadores: 2019, 2022, 2025
- Recopa Sudamericana: 2020
- Campeonato Brasileiro Série A: 2019, 2020, 2025, 2026
- Copa do Brasil: 2022, 2024
- Supercopa do Brasil: 2020, 2021, 2025
- Campeonato Carioca: 2019, 2020, 2021, 2024, 2025, 2026

Individual

- Best Winger in Brazil: 2017, 2019, 2021
- Copa Libertadores Best player: 2019
- Copa Libertadores top assist provider: 2019, 2022
- Copa Libertadores Team of the tournament: 2019
- Troféu Mesa Redonda Best Player: 2019
- Bola de Prata: 2019
- Campeonato Brasileiro Série A Best Player: 2019
- Campeonato Brasileiro Série A Team of the Year: 2019
- Campeonato Carioca Top scorer: 2019
- Campeonato Carioca top assist provider: 2019
- Campeonato Carioca Team of the Year: 2019, 2020
- South American Footballer of the Year Silver Ball: 2019
- South American Team of the Year: 2019
- FIFA Club World Cup Silver Ball: 2019
- Supercopa do Brasil Man of the Match: 2025
