= Rincon (footballer, born 1994) =

Brazilian footballer

Personal information
- Full name: Rincon Teixeira da Rocha
- Date of birth: 22 July 1994 (age 32)
- Place of birth: Ubá, Brazil
- Position: Forward

Team information
- Current team: Marquense

Senior career*
Years	Team	Apps	(Gls)
2017–2018	Santa Cruz-RJ	31	(23)
2019	Cabofriense	8	(4)
2024-	Marquense	0	(0)
- * Club domestic league appearances and goals as of 14 April 2019

Rincon Teixeira da Rocha (born 22 July 1994), known simply as Rincon, is a Brazilian professional footballer who plays as a forward for Liga Nacional club Marquense.

== Club career ==
=== Santa Cruz-RJ ===
Born in Ubá, Minas Gerais, Rincon only played amateur football well into his 20s. In 2017, he joined Santa Cruz-RJ for the Campeonato Carioca Série B2.

Rincon made his senior debut on 25 June 2017, starting and scoring a brace in a 2–2 home draw against Bela Vista. On 21 August, he scored a hat-trick in a 4–2 away defeat of Juventus-RJ, and finished the year with 13 goals in 13 appearances, as his side achieved promotion to the Campeonato Carioca Série B1.

During the 2018 campaign, Rincon scored ten times as his side was relegated back to the third division.

=== Cabofriense ===
On 12 November 2018, Rincon joined Cabofriense for the ensuing Campeonato Carioca. He made his debut for the club on 20 January 2019, coming on as a second-half substitute for Rafael and scoring the last in a 3–1 home defeat of Botafogo.

On 2 March 2019, Rincon scored twice in a 4–1 routing at Americano. Fifteen days later, he scored the opener in a 2–0 home success over Vasco da Gama, thus removing the club's unbeaten status in the year.

== Career statistics ==
As of 17 April 2019

Club	Season	League			State League		Cup		Conmebol		Other		Total	
Club	Season	Division	Apps	Goals	Apps	Goals	Apps	Goals	Apps	Goals	Apps	Goals	Apps	Goals
Santa Cruz	2017	Carioca B2	—		13	13	—		—		—		13	13
Santa Cruz	2018	Carioca B1	—		18	10	—		—		1 (Note: Appearance(s) in Copa Rio)	0	19	10
Santa Cruz	Total		—		31	23	—		—		1	0	32	23
Cabofriense	2019	Carioca	—		8	4	—		—		—		8	4
Career total			0	0	39	27	0	0	0	0	1	0	40	27
