= 2019 Campeonato Carioca Série B1 =

Campeonato Carioca Série B1
- Season: 2019
- Dates: 25 May – 6 October 2019
- Champions: Friburguense
- Promoted: Friburguense; America
- Relegated: Tigres do Brasil; Itaboraí; Barra da Tijuca

The 2019 Campeonato Carioca Série B1 was the 39th edition of the second division of football in Rio de Janeiro. The contest is organized by FERJ. Since 2017, the Campeonato Carioca Série B has been called the Série B1. Friburguense were champions, defeating America 2–1 in the second match of the final after the first match ended 1-1. Friburguense and America were promoted to the 2020 Campeonato Carioca. America returned to the top division in 2020 after being relegated from the 2019 Campeonato Carioca.

== Participating teams ==
| Club | Home city |
|---|---|
| America | Rio de Janeiro |
| Angra dos Reis | Angra dos Reis |
| Artsul | Nova Iguaçu |
| Audax Rio | São João de Meriti |
| Barra da Tijuca | Rio de Janeiro |
| Bonsucesso | Rio de Janeiro |
| Campos | Campos dos Goytacazes |
| Duque de Caxias | Duque de Caxias |
| Friburguense | Nova Friburgo |
| Gonçalense | São Gonçalo |
| Goytacaz | Campos dos Goytacazes |
| Itaboraí | Itaboraí |
| Nova Cidade | Nilópolis |
| Olaria | Rio de Janeiro |
| Sampaio Corrêa | Saquarema |
| São Gonçalo | São Gonçalo |
| Serra Macaense | Macaé |
| Serrano | Petrópolis |
| Tigres do Brasil | Duque de Caxias |

== Championship round ==
=== Taça Santos Dumont ===
Group A

| Pos | Team | Pld | W | D | L | GF | GA | GD | Pts | Qualification |
|---|---|---|---|---|---|---|---|---|---|---|
| 1 | America (Q) | 9 | 6 | 0 | 3 | 16 | 8 | +8 | 18 | Advance to Semifinals |
| 2 | Goytacaz (Q) | 9 | 4 | 5 | 0 | 14 | 6 | +8 | 17 | Advance to Semifinals |
| 3 | Gonçalense | 9 | 4 | 3 | 2 | 13 | 13 | 0 | 15 | |
| 4 | Sampaio Corrêa | 9 | 4 | 2 | 3 | 15 | 10 | +5 | 14 | |
| 5 | Audax Rio | 9 | 4 | 2 | 3 | 14 | 13 | +1 | 14 | |
| 6 | Olaria | 9 | 3 | 4 | 2 | 9 | 9 | 0 | 13 | |
| 7 | São Gonçalo | 9 | 2 | 3 | 4 | 9 | 12 | −3 | 9 | |
| 8 | Nova Cidade | 9 | 2 | 3 | 4 | 7 | 14 | −7 | 9 | |
| 9 | Artsul | 9 | 1 | 5 | 3 | 7 | 11 | −4 | 8 | |
| 10 | Angra dos Reis | 9 | 1 | 1 | 7 | 7 | 16 | −9 | 4 | |

Rules for classification: 1) points; 2) goal difference; 3) number of goals scored.
(Q) Qualified for the phase indicated

Group B

| Pos | Team | Pld | W | D | L | GF | GA | GD | Pts | Qualification |
|---|---|---|---|---|---|---|---|---|---|---|
| 1 | Bonsucesso (Q) | 8 | 6 | 2 | 0 | 16 | 2 | +14 | 20 | Advance to Semifinals |
| 2 | Campos (Q) | 8 | 3 | 4 | 1 | 6 | 4 | +2 | 13 | Advance to Semifinals |
| 3 | Serra Macaense | 8 | 3 | 2 | 3 | 7 | 6 | +1 | 11 | |
| 4 | Serrano | 8 | 3 | 2 | 3 | 8 | 6 | +2 | 11 | |
| 5 | Friburguense | 8 | 3 | 2 | 3 | 7 | 9 | −2 | 11 | |
| 6 | Duque de Caxias | 8 | 2 | 5 | 1 | 6 | 2 | +4 | 11 | |
| 7 | Tigres do Brasil | 8 | 2 | 2 | 4 | 8 | 8 | 0 | 8 | |
| 8 | Barra da Tijuca | 8 | 1 | 4 | 3 | 5 | 10 | −5 | 7 | |
| 9 | Itaboraí | 8 | 1 | 1 | 6 | 3 | 17 | −14 | 4 | |

Rules for classification: 1) points; 2) goal difference; 3) number of goals scored.
(Q) Qualified for the phase indicated

Knockout stage

Semifinals
1 | America | 1
4 | Campos | 0
3 | Bonsucesso | 1
2 | Goytacaz | 1

Final
Bonsucesso | 2
America | 4

Taça Santos Dumont
2019 champion
America
1st title

=== Taça Corcovado ===
Group A

| Pos | Team | Pld | W | D | L | GF | GA | GD | Pts | Qualification |
|---|---|---|---|---|---|---|---|---|---|---|
| 1 | Artsul (Q) | 9 | 6 | 3 | 0 | 19 | 6 | +13 | 21 | Advance to Semifinals |
| 2 | America (Q) | 9 | 6 | 1 | 2 | 14 | 8 | +6 | 19 | Advance to Semifinals |
| 3 | Goytacaz | 9 | 5 | 2 | 2 | 14 | 8 | +6 | 17 | |
| 4 | Sampaio Corrêa | 9 | 5 | 1 | 3 | 17 | 7 | +10 | 16 | |
| 5 | São Gonçalo | 9 | 5 | 1 | 3 | 12 | 8 | +4 | 16 | |
| 6 | Olaria | 9 | 4 | 1 | 4 | 12 | 7 | +5 | 13 | |
| 7 | Nova Cidade | 9 | 5 | 1 | 3 | 11 | 12 | −1 | 16 | |
| 8 | Audax Rio | 9 | 4 | 4 | 1 | 10 | 3 | +7 | 16 | |
| 9 | Angra dos Reis | 9 | 4 | 3 | 2 | 8 | 7 | +1 | 15 | |
| 10 | Gonçalense | 9 | 1 | 2 | 6 | 12 | 21 | −9 | 5 | |

Rules for classification: 1) points; 2) goal difference; 3) number of goals scored.
(Q) Qualified for the phase indicated

Group B

| Pos | Team | Pld | W | D | L | GF | GA | GD | Pts | Qualification |
|---|---|---|---|---|---|---|---|---|---|---|
| 1 | Duque de Caxias (Q) | 10 | 6 | 3 | 1 | 13 | 4 | +9 | 21 | Advance to Semifinals |
| 2 | Friburguense (Q) | 10 | 5 | 2 | 3 | 16 | 10 | +6 | 17 | Advance to Semifinals |
| 3 | Bonsucesso | 10 | 4 | 1 | 5 | 12 | 10 | +2 | 13 | |
| 4 | Serra Macaense | 10 | 3 | 3 | 4 | 8 | 11 | −3 | 12 | |
| 5 | Barra da Tijuca | 10 | 2 | 3 | 5 | 10 | 17 | −7 | 9 | |
| 6 | Serrano | 10 | 2 | 3 | 5 | 6 | 14 | −8 | 9 | |
| 7 | Itaboraí | 10 | 2 | 2 | 6 | 11 | 19 | −8 | 8 | |
| 8 | Campos | 10 | 2 | 1 | 7 | 6 | 18 | −12 | 7 | |
| 9 | Tigres do Brasil | 10 | 1 | 1 | 8 | 7 | 18 | −11 | 4 | |

Rules for classification: 1) points; 2) goal difference; 3) number of goals scored.
(Q) Qualified for the phase indicated

Knockout stage

Semifinals
1 | Duque de Caxias | 0
4 | America | 3
3 | Artsul | 0
2 | Friburguense | 1

Final
America | 0
Friburguense | 1

Taça Corcovado
2019 champion
Friburguense
1st title

== Overall table ==
| Pos | Team | Qualification or relegation |
|---|---|---|
| 1 | America | Advance to Semifinals |
| 2 | Goytacaz | Advance to Semifinals |
| 3 | Bonsucesso | Advance to Semifinals |
| 4 | Friburguense | Advance to Semifinals |
| 5 | Sampaio Corrêa | |
| 6 | Audax Rio | |
| 7 | Artsul | |
| 8 | Duque de Caxias | |
| 9 | Olaria | |
| 10 | São Gonçalo | |
| 11 | Nova Cidade | |
| 12 | Serra Macaense | |
| 13 | Gonçalense | |
| 14 | Campos | |
| 15 | Serrano | |
| 16 | Angra dos Reis | |
| 17 | Tigres do Brasil | Relegation to 2020 Série B2 |
| 18 | Barra da Tijuca | Relegation to 2020 Série B2 |
| 19 | Itaboraí | Relegation to 2020 Série B2 |

=== Final stage ===
Semifinals
1 | Goytacaz | 0 | 0 | 0
4 | Friburguense | 2 | 1 | 3
3 | Bonsucesso | 1 | 1 | 2
2 | America | 2 | 1 | 3

Final
Friburguense | 1 | 2 | 3
America | 1 | 1 | 2

Campeonato Carioca Série B1
2019 champion
Friburguense
3rd title
