= Moacyrzão =

Brazilian football stadium

Coordinates: 22.3565°S 41.7716°W

Estádio Cláudio Moacir de Azevedo
- Moacyrzão
- Interactive map of Estádio Cláudio Moacir de Azevedo
- Location: Macaé (RJ), Brazil
- Capacity: 15,000
- Surface: Grass

Construction
- Opened: May 1, 1982

Tenants
- Macaé; Serra Macaense

Estádio Cláudio Moacir de Azevedo, also known as Moacyrzão, is a stadium in Macaé. It has a maximum capacity of 15,000 spectators. It belongs to the Macae Prefecture. It is the home of Macaé Esporte Futebol Clube and Serra Macaense FC.
