= Gabriel Barbosa =

Brazilian footballer (born 1996)

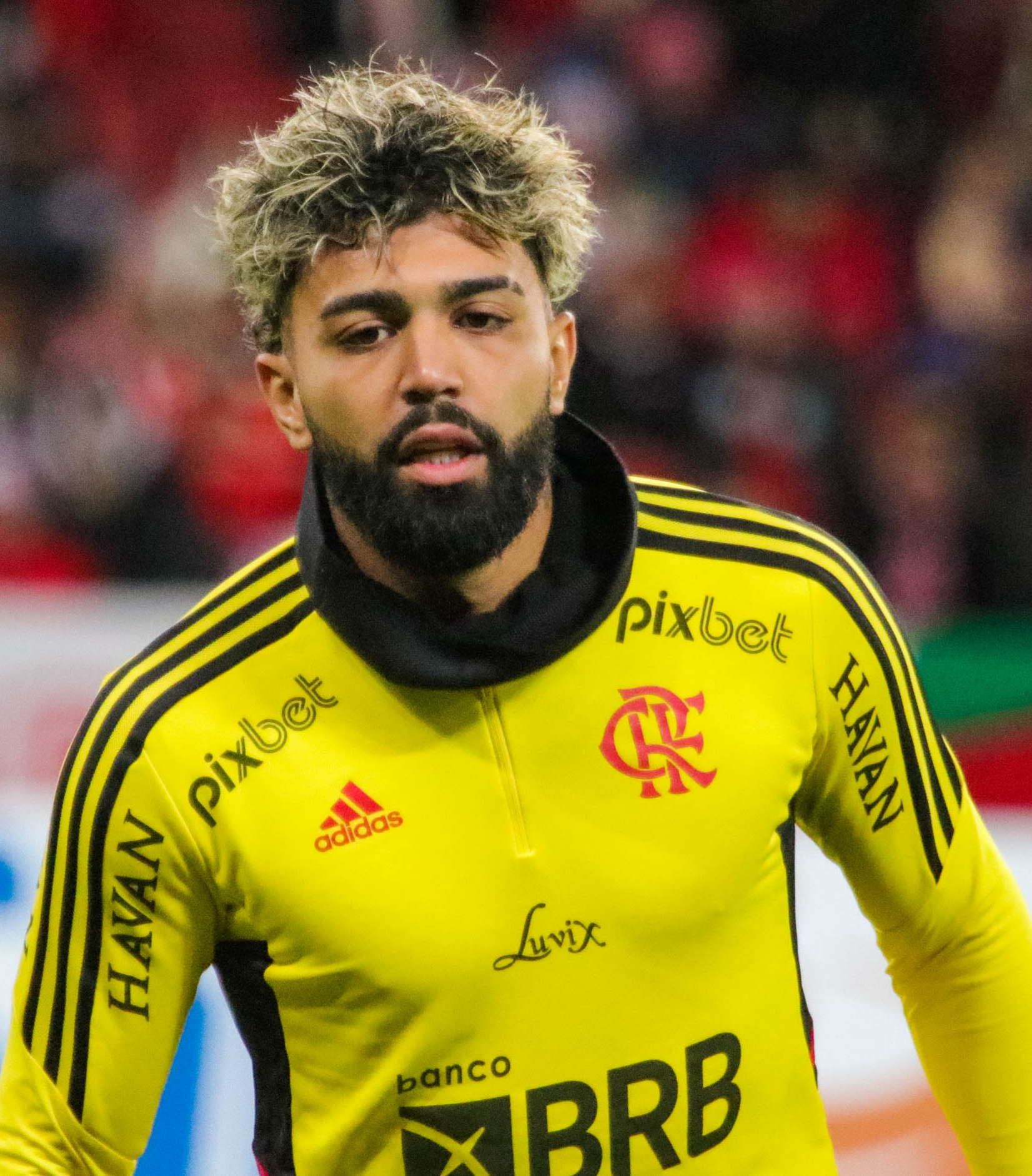
- Gabriel with Flamengo in 2022

Personal information
- Full name: Gabriel Barbosa Almeida
- Date of birth: 30 August 1996 (age 30)
- Place of birth: São Bernardo do Campo, Brazil
- Height: 1.76 m (5 ft 9 in)
- Position: Striker

Team information
- Current team: Santos (on loan from Cruzeiro)
- Number: 9

Youth career
- 2004–2013: Santos

Senior career*
Years	Team	Apps	(Gls)
2013–2016	Santos	130	(41)
2016–2020	Inter Milan	10	(1)
2017–2018	→ Benfica (loan)	5	(1)
2018	→ Santos (loan)	43	(22)
2019	→ Flamengo (loan)	41	(32)
2020–2024	Flamengo	166	(78)
2025–	Cruzeiro	37	(11)
2026–	→ Santos (loan)	35	(20)

International career^{‡}
2011	Brazil U15	4	(0)
2013	Brazil U17	5	(3)
2014–2015	Brazil U20	13	(4)
2015–2016	Brazil U23	11	(8)
2016–2022	Brazil	18	(5)
Medal record
Men's football
Representing Brazil
Olympic Games
Gold medal – first place	2016 Rio de Janeiro	Team
Copa América
Runner-up	2021 Brazil
- * Club domestic league appearances and goals as of 23:46, 18 November 2026 (UTC) ‡ National team caps and goals as of 15:43, 4 July 2022 (UTC)

Gabriel Barbosa Almeida (born 30 August 1996), commonly known as Gabigol or Gabi, is a Brazilian professional footballer who plays as a striker for Campeonato Brasileiro Série A club Santos, on loan from Cruzeiro.

A graduate of the Santos academy, Gabriel made his professional debut at the age of 16 and made over 200 appearances for the club across all competitions. He joined Flamengo in 2019, where he played 306 games and scored 161 goals. He scored twice in the dying minutes of the 2019 Copa Libertadores final, and the only goal of the 2022 final. In 2019, he won the Bola de Ouro and South American Footballer of the Year. After six seasons with Flamengo, he joined fellow Brazilian club Cruzeiro.

Gabriel played 18 games for Brazil between 2016 and 2022, and scored five goals. He was part of the squads for the Copa América Centenario and the 2021 Copa América, finishing as runners-up at the latter. He also won a gold medal at the 2016 Olympic tournament.

== Club career ==
=== Early career ===
Born in São Bernardo do Campo, São Paulo, Gabriel joined Santos's youth setup in 2004, at the age of 8; his prolific goalscoring with the club's youth sides saw him earn the nickname Gabigol. On 25 September 2012, he signed a professional contract, with a €50 million buyout clause, and made his first team debut on 17 January of the following year, in a friendly match against Grêmio Barueri.

=== Santos ===
On 26 May 2013, Gabriel made his league debut, at only 16 years old, in a 0–0 draw against Flamengo. He scored his first professional goal on 22 August, netting the game's only goal in a home success against Grêmio, for the year's Copa do Brasil.

On 1 February 2014, Gabriel scored a brace and Santos' 12,000th goal in a 5–1 victory against Botafogo-SP, for that year's Campeonato Paulista championship. He finished the tournament with seven goals, as Peixe finished second.

Gabriel netted his first Série A goal on 20 April 2014, scoring his side's only in a 1–1 home draw against Sport Recife. He signed a new five-year deal with the club on 23 September, and finished the season with 21 goals, ten ahead of big money signing Leandro Damião.

After starting the 2015 campaign on the bench, Gabriel was appointed as first-choice after the departure of Robinho. He scored ten goals in the year's Brasileirão, and was the top scorer in Copa do Brasil with eight goals, with highlights including braces against Sport Recife, Joinville and Atlético Mineiro, and the winner in the first leg of the national cup's final against Palmeiras. His impressive form for the season with Santos also saw him named by Spanish sport magazine Don Balón as one of 101 best young talents in world football in 2015.

Gabriel started the 2016 season with two back-to-back goals against São Bernardo and Ponte Preta. On 24 April he scored a double in a 2–2 home draw against Palmeiras (3–2 win on penalties), as his side reached the finals of the Paulistão for the eight consecutive time.

=== Inter Milan ===
On 27 August 2016, after being warmly welcomed by Inter Milan fans when he landed in Milan the day before, Gabriel signed for the club on a five-year contract in a deal reportedly worth €29.5m.

On 22 September 2016, the club officially introduced Gabriel as an Inter player in the Pirelli auditorium with a media show: the striker entered the press room after a video showing him below the statue of Christ the Redeemer in Rio de Janeiro and then on Milan rooftops, evoking the image Inter had made to introduce Il Fenomeno Ronaldo 1997.

Gabigol made his first appearance on 25 September 2016, as a 73rd-mijute substitute for Antonio Candreva. He scored his first goal for Inter on 19 February after coming on as a substitute in a 1–0 away victory against Bologna.

==== Benfica (loan) ====
On 31 August 2017, Gabriel joined Portuguese club Benfica on a season-long loan deal. He made his debut on 12 September in a UEFA Champions League match against CSKA Moscow, replacing Álex Grimaldo in the 77th minute.

Gabriel made his Primeira Liga debut in a 2–1 loss at Boavista on 16 September 2017; he replaced Andrija Živković, again in the 77th minute. He left the club in January with just 165 minutes of playtime and one goal scored, against Olhanense for the Taça de Portugal.

==== Return to Santos (loan) ====
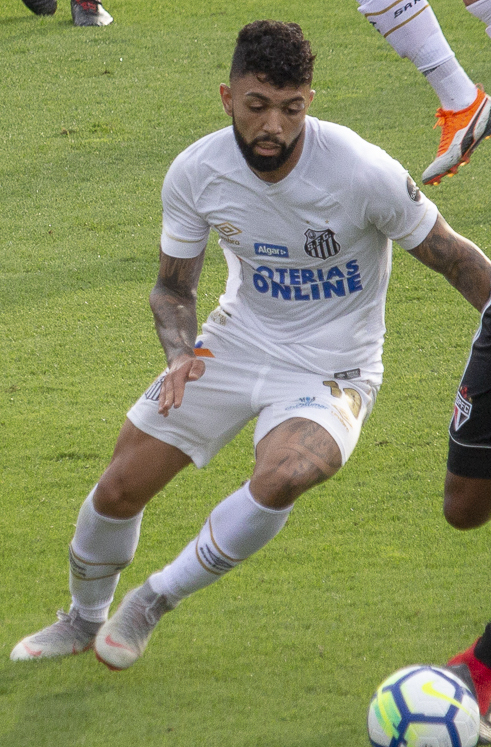
Gabriel playing for Santos in 2018

On 25 January 2018, Gabriel's former club Santos announced that they had reached an agreement with Inter for his return to the club on a one-year loan deal. He made the first appearance of his loan on 11 February, starting and scoring his team's second in a 2–2 away draw against Ferroviária.

Gabriel made his Copa Libertadores debut on 1 March 2018, starting in a 2–0 away loss against Real Garcilaso. On 11 May, he scored a hat-trick – the first of his professional career – in a 5–1 home routing of Luverdense, for the year's national cup.

On 1 September 2018, Gabriel scored all his team's goals in a 3–0 away win against Vasco da Gama.

==== Flamengo (loan) ====
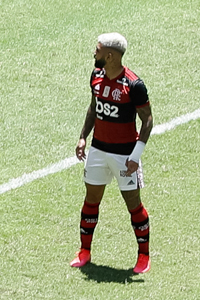
Gabriel playing for Flamengo

On 11 January 2019, Flamengo officially announced an agreement with Inter Milan to sign Gabriel on loan until 31 December 2019.

Gabriel debuted for Flamengo on 23 January 2019 in a Campeonato Carioca 1–1 draw against Resende; he started the match and played all 90 minutes. He scored his first goal for Flamengo on 24 February 2019 in a 4–1 win against Americano, this was the first match of a six-game streak scoring including goals in Copa Libertadores matches against San José and LDU Quito and a brace against Portuguesa (RJ) and Madureira in the Campeonato Carioca. Flamengo won the 2019 Campeonato Carioca with Gabriel scoring 7 goals in 12 matches, also being selected to the tournament team of the year.

On 23 November 2019, Gabriel scored two late goals in the 2019 Copa Libertadores Final, in a 2–1 win over River Plate, when he was also sent off in the game, and became the top scorer of the competition with nine goals. Less than 24 hours later, Flamengo became champions of the Campeonato Brasileiro, with Gabriel having scored 25 league goals in the championship and becoming the first player since Túlio Maravilha in 1995 to be the nation's top goalscorer in two consecutive years; he also became the top goalscorer of the Brasileirão in the double round-robin-era, established in 2003.

Flamengo's supporters quickly adopted Gabriel as one of their favourite players and chanted the slogan Hoje tem gol do Gabigol (today Gabigol will score) frequently in the stadiums. He was awarded with the Bola de Ouro award for his efforts in Brazil and was crowned South American Footballer of the Year by Uruguayan newspaper El País.

=== Flamengo ===
On 27 January 2020, Flamengo announced that the club agreed on a permanent transfer and Gabriel signed a contract with the club until December 2024 with a deal reportedly worth €17.5m.

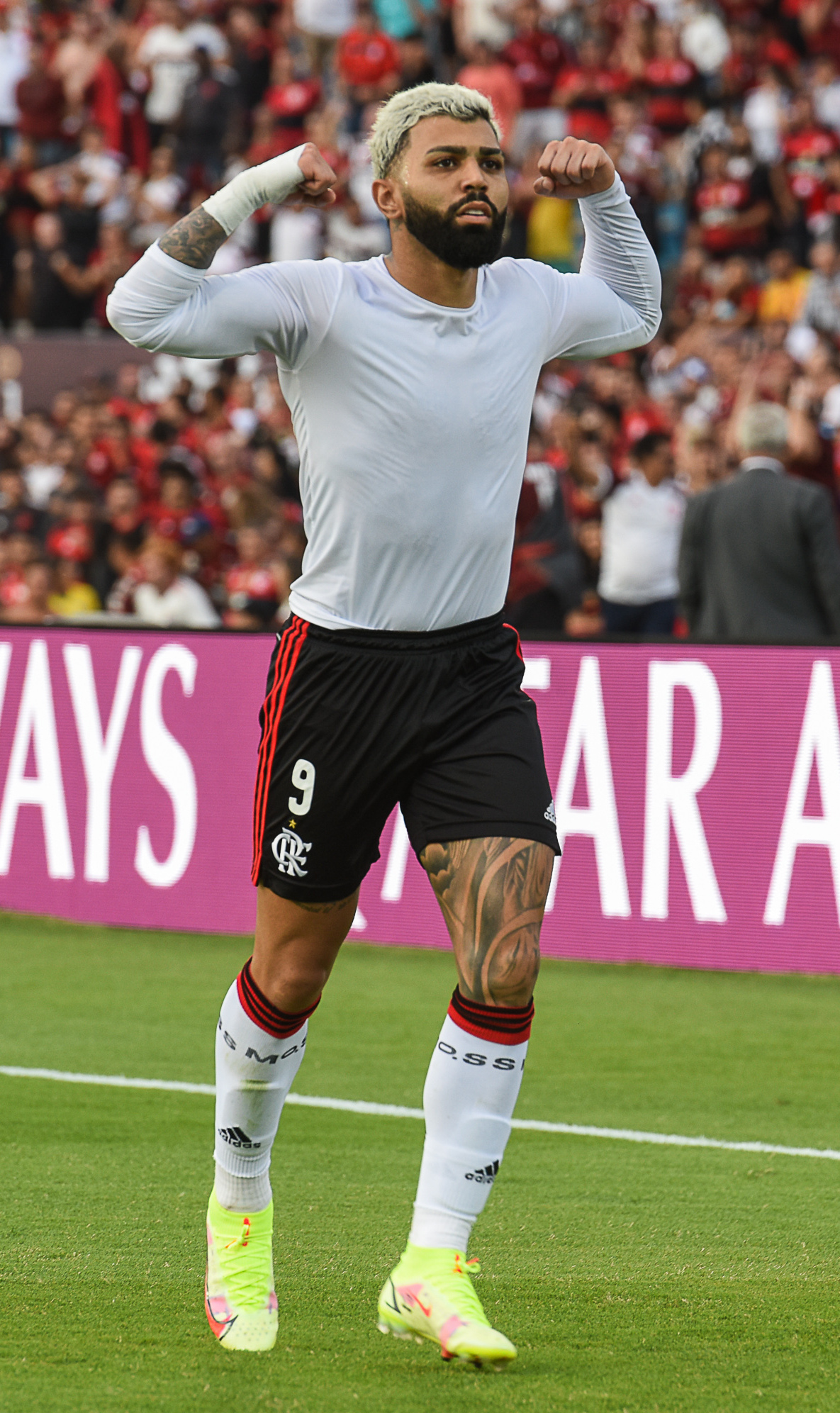
Gabriel celebrating a goal in the 2021 Copa Libertadores Final

Gabriel became the youngest player to reach 100 goals in the Campeonato Brasileiro Série A, on 4 September 2022. On this date, Flamengo and Ceará drew 1–1, at Maracanã, in the 25th round of the Campeonato Brasileiro.

On 1 July 2023, Flamengo won a Campeonato Brasileiro Série A match against Fortaleza at home 2–0, with Gabriel scoring the first goal of the evening and reaching the mark of 150 total goals for Flamengo, becoming the ninth player in club's history to achieve this number.

The Brazilian Doping Control Authority voted on 24 March 2024 to suspend Gabriel for two years for attempted anti-doping fraud, after he was accused of making it difficult to carry out an anti-doping test before a Flamengo game in the Rio de Janeiro state league. The anti-doping body added that the ban would count from the date of the violation which occurred on 8 April 2023. Gabriel issued a statement denying the allegations stating he has "never tried to obstruct or defraud any test" and that he plans to appeal the decision with the Court of Arbitration for Sport (CAS). Flamengo said in a separate statement that they were surprised by the verdict and would support the player with his appeal "because there was no type of fraud". On 30 April 2024, CAS stayed the execution of the ban and cleared Gabriel to play, pending an appeal hearing and conclusion of the arbitration.

=== Cruzeiro ===
On 1 January 2025, Cruzeiro announced Gabriel as their new signing, with the player agreeing to a four-year contract. He made his club debut on 25 January, starting in a 1–1 Campeonato Mineiro home draw against Betim, and scored a hat-trick in a 4–1 home routing of Itabirito five days later.

An undisputed starter under head coach Fernando Diniz and caretaker Wesley Carvalho, Gabriel was dropped to the bench by new head coach Leonardo Jardim, but was still regularly used. He came off the bench in both matches of the 2025 Copa do Brasil semifinals against Corinthians, but missed one of the club's penalties which caused their elimination in the shootout.

==== Third spell at Santos (loan) ====
On 3 January 2026, Santos announced the return of Gabriel for a third spell, again on loan. He played his first match after the return seven days later, starting and scoring the equalizer in a 2–1 home win over Novorizontino.

On 13 August 2026, Gabriel scored his 100th goal for Santos, netting the equalizer in a 2–1 home win over Macará.

== International career ==
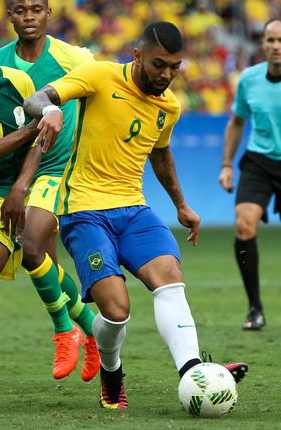
Gabriel in 2016

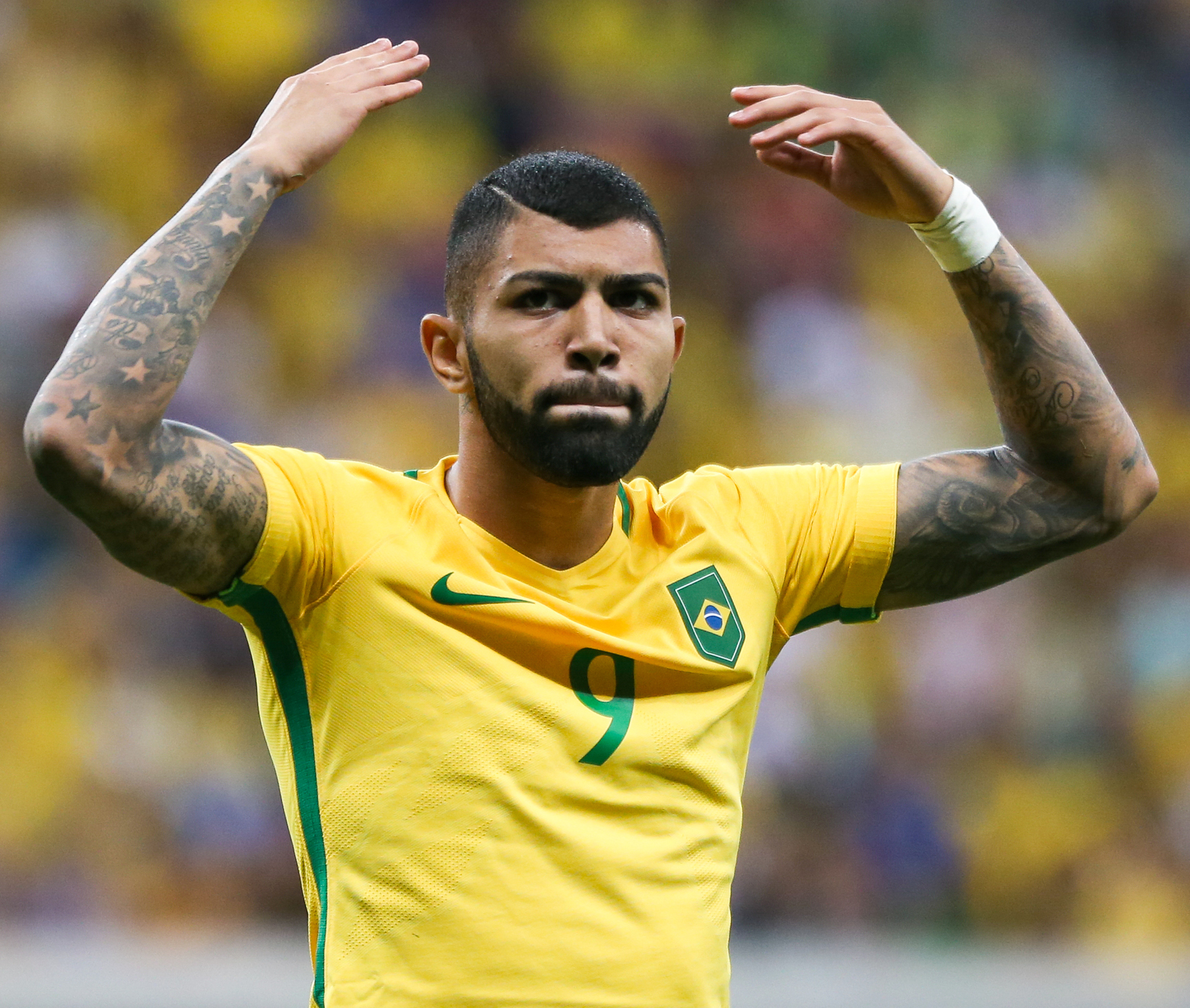
Gabriel at the 2016 Olympics

=== Youth ===
In November 2011, Gabriel was called up to Brazil under-15s. On 20 June 2013, he appeared with the under-17s in a tournament in Miami.

On 22 July 2014, Gabriel was called up to the under-20s for the year's L'Alcúdia International Football Tournament. He was the competition's top scorer, but missed the final 2–0 win over Levante due to a dismissal in the previous game against Argentina.

Gabriel was also included in Alexandre Gallo's 23-man squad for the 2015 South American U-20 Championship held in Uruguay. He scored his first goal in the competition on 20 January 2015, netting the last in a 2–0 win against Venezuela.

In 2015, Gabriel was also called up for friendlies with the under-23 side, scoring six goals in only four matches. He was also part of the host team that won a gold medal at the 2016 Summer Olympics on home soil under manager Rogério Micale. Gabriel scored a brace for Brazil in their final group game against Denmark in an eventual 4–0 win.

=== Senior ===
On 26 March 2016, Gabriel received his first call up to the full squad, replacing suspended Neymar for a 2018 World Cup qualifier against Paraguay. He was an unused substitute in the 2–2 draw at the Estadio Defensores del Chaco in Asunción.

Gabriel was called up by manager Dunga in May 2016 to participate in the Copa América Centenario to be held in the United States, describing the call-up as a "dream". He made his full international debut on 29 May, replacing goalscorer Jonas and scoring the last in a 2–0 friendly win over Panama. On 8 June, he came on as a substitute and scored a goal in Brazil's 7–1 win over Haiti in their second group match of the Copa América.

On 20 September 2019, Gabriel returned to the national team for the first time since the Copa América Centenario, when he was called up by manager Tite for a pair of friendlies against Senegal and Nigeria played in Singapore.

In June 2021, he was included in Brazil's squad for the 2021 Copa América on home soil. On 13 June, in Brazil's opening group match of the tournament, he scored the final goal in a 3–0 win over Venezuela. On 10 July, he made a substitute appearance in his nation's 1–0 defeat to rivals Argentina in the final.

== Playing style ==
Considered to be a talented prospect in his youth, Gabriel is known for his technical skills, creativity and use of tricks on the ball; due to his flair and flamboyant playing style, he was dubbed the "next Neymar" by the media in 2016.

During his time with Santos and Flamengo, Gabriel's role on the pitch has evolved; originally a supporting forward capable of playing with his back to goal or on the wing, he transformed into a full-on striker with the main task of finding space inside the opponent's penalty box and poaching goals. Besides his goalscoring and positioning in attack, his physique also improved, leading him to start winning more aerial duels.

Due to recent changes in his style of play, he has been compared to Mauro Icardi, his former teammate at Inter Milan.

A controversial figure, he struggled to make the grade in Europe. In 2022, South American football expert Tim Vickery was damning with his verdict: “He’s 25 already, he had one go already in Europe with Inter Milan and Benfica, and it was an absolute disaster. People spoke very badly of him, if he was chocolate he would eat himself, he swanned around like he was Pretty Boy Floyd."

== Career statistics ==
=== Club ===
As of match played 18 November 2026

Appearances and goals by club, season and competition
Club	Season	League			State league (Note: Includes Campeonato Paulista, Campeonato Carioca, Campeonato Mineiro)		National cup (Note: Includes Copa do Brasil, Coppa Italia, Taça de Portugal)		Continental		Other		Total	
Club	Season	Division	Apps	Goals	Apps	Goals	Apps	Goals	Apps	Goals	Apps	Goals	Apps	Goals
Santos	2013	Série A	11	1	0	0	2	1	—		—		13	2
Santos	2014	Série A	31	8	18	7	7	6	—		—		56	21
Santos	2015	Série A	30	10	12	3	14	8	—		—		56	21
Santos	2016	Série A	11	5	17	7	1	0	—		—		29	12
Santos	Total		83	24	47	17	24	15	—		—		154	56
Inter Milan	2016–17	Serie A	9	1	—		1	0	0	0	—		10	1
Benfica (loan)	2017–18	Primeira Liga	1	0	—		1	1	2 (Note: Appearances in UEFA Champions League)	0	1 (Note: Appearance in Taça da Liga)	0	5	1
Santos (loan)	2018	Série A	35	18	8	4	3	4	7 (Note: Appearances in Copa Libertadores)	1	—		53	27
Flamengo (loan)	2019	Série A	29	25	12	7	4	2	12	9	2 (Note: Appearances in FIFA Club World Cup)	0	59	43
Flamengo	2020	Série A	25	14	10	8	1	1	5	2	2 (Note: One appearance and one goal in Supercopa do Brasil, one appearance and one goal in Recopa Sudamericana)	2	43	27
Flamengo	2021	Série A	18	12	8	8	5	2	13	11	1 (Note: Appearance in Supercopa do Brasil)	1	45	34
Flamengo	2022	Série A	29	11	12	9	9	2	12	6	1	1	63	29
Flamengo	2023	Série A	26	5	11	5	9	4	7	2	5 (Note: One appearance and two goals in Supercopa do Brasil, two appearances and two goals in FIFA Club World Cup, two appearances in Recopa Sudamericana)	4	58	20
Flamengo	2024	Série A	19	4	8	2	7	2	4	0	—		38	8
Flamengo	Flamengo total		146	71	61	39	35	13	53	30	11	8	306	161
Cruzeiro	2025	Série A	30	6	7	5	8	0	4 (Note: Appearances in Copa Sudamericana)	2	—		49	13
Santos (loan)	2026	Série A	27	16	8	4	6	0	9	6	—		50	26
Career total			331	136	131	69	78	33	75	39	12	8	627	285

=== International ===
As of match played 27 January 2022

Appearances and goals by national team and year
National team	Year	Apps	Goals
Brazil	2016	4	2
Brazil	2017	0	0
Brazil	2018	0	0
Brazil	2019	1	0
Brazil	2020	0	0
Brazil	2021	12	3
Brazil	2022	1	0
Total		18	5

Scores and results list Brazil's goal tally first, score column indicates score after each Gabriel goal.

List of international goals scored by Gabriel Barbosa
No.	Date	Venue	Opponent	Score	Result	Competition
1	29 May 2016	Dick's Sporting Goods Park, Commerce City, United States	Panama	2–0	2–0	Friendly
2	8 June 2016	Camping World Stadium, Orlando, United States	Haiti	4–0	7–1	Copa América Centenario
3	13 June 2021	Estádio Nacional Mané Garrincha, Brasília, Brazil	Venezuela	3–0	3–0	2021 Copa América
4	7 October 2021	Estadio Olímpico de la UCV, Caracas, Venezuela	Venezuela	2–1	3–1	2022 FIFA World Cup qualification
5	14 October 2021	Arena da Amazônia, Manaus, Brazil	Uruguay	4–1	4–1	2022 FIFA World Cup qualification

== Honours ==
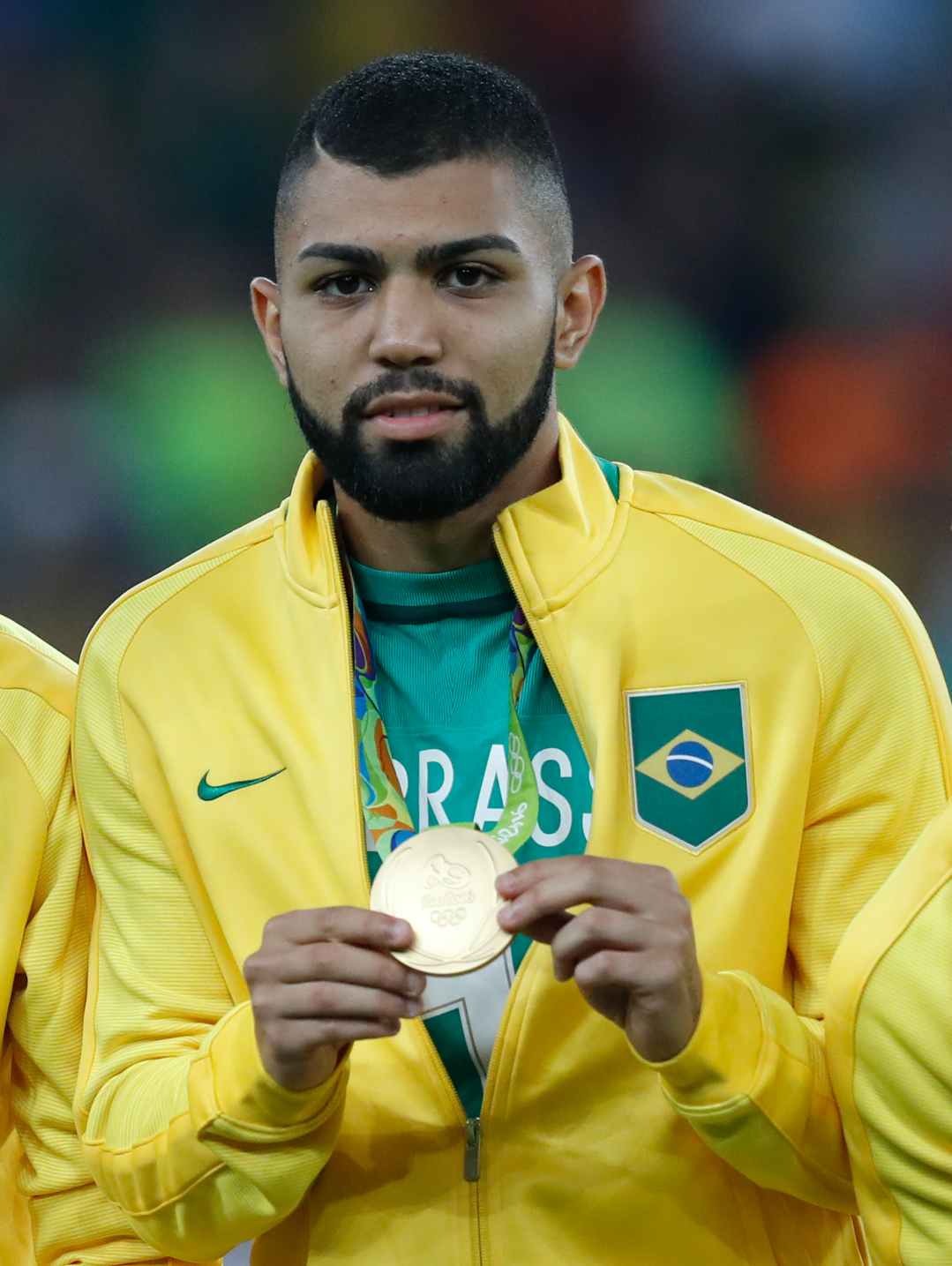
Gabriel displaying his gold medal at the 2016 Summer Olympics.

Santos

- Campeonato Paulista: 2015, 2016

Flamengo

- Copa Libertadores: 2019, 2022
- Recopa Sudamericana: 2020
- Campeonato Brasileiro Série A: 2019, 2020
- Copa do Brasil: 2022, 2024
- Supercopa do Brasil: 2020, 2021
- Campeonato Carioca: 2019, 2020, 2021, 2024

Brazil U23

- Olympic Gold Medal: 2016

Brazil

- Copa América runner-up: 2021

Individual

- Bola de Prata Best Newcomer: 2015
- Campeonato Paulista Team of the Year: 2016, 2018
- Campeonato Carioca Top scorer: 2020, 2022
- Campeonato Carioca Team of the Year: 2019, 2020, 2021, 2022
- Copa do Brasil Top scorer: 2014, 2015, 2018
- Copa do Brasil Team of the Season: 2024
- Bola de Prata: 2018, 2019
- Best Forward in Brazil: 2018, 2019
- Campeonato Brasileiro Série A Team of the Year: 2018, 2019, 2020
- Campeonato Brasileiro Série A Top scorer: 2018, 2019
- Bola de Ouro: 2019
- Copa Libertadores Team of the Tournament: 2019, 2021, 2022
- Copa Libertadores Top scorer: 2019, 2021
- Copa Libertadores Best Player: 2021
- South American Team of the Year: 2019, 2021, 2022
- South American Footballer of the Year: 2019
- IFFHS Men's CONMEBOL Team: 2021
