= Edson Souza =

Brazilian footballer and manager (born 1964)

Personal information
- Full name: Edson Santana de Souza
- Date of birth: 12 October 1964 (age 62)
- Place of birth: Santo André, Brazil
- Position: Midfielder

Team information
- Current team: Carlos Renaux (head coach)

Senior career*
Years	Team	Apps	(Gls)
1983	Bonsucesso		
1984–1987	Fluminense		
1988–1989	Cruzeiro		
1989	Bangu		
1991	São José		
1992	Vasco da Gama		
1993	Santo André		
1994	Friburguense		
1995	Bangu		
1996–1998	União da Madeira		
2000	Bangu		
2002	Madureira		
2002	America		

Managerial career
- 2006–2008: Nova Iguaçu
- 2009: Bangu
- 2010–2011: Friburguense
- 2011: Audax Rio
- 2011–2012: Portuguesa-RJ
- 2013: São João da Barra
- 2014: Nova Iguaçu
- 2014–2015: Resende
- 2015: Cabofriense
- 2016–2017: Nova Iguaçu
- 2017: Portuguesa-RJ
- 2018: Nova Iguaçu
- 2019: Resende
- 2019: Portuguesa-RJ
- 2020: Resende
- 2020: Brasiliense
- 2021: Real Brasília
- 2022: 4 de Julho
- 2023–: Carlos Renaux
- * Club domestic league appearances and goals

Edson Santana de Souza (born 12 December 1964), known as Edson Souza, is a Brazilian football coach and former player who played as a midfielder. He is the current head coach of Carlos Renaux.

== Honours ==
=== Player ===
Fluminense

- Campeonato Brasileiro Série A: 1984
- Campeonato Carioca: 1983, 1984, 1985

Cruzeiro

- Campeonato Mineiro: 1987

Vasco da Gama

- Copa Rio: 1992

=== Manager ===
Nova Iguaçu

- Copa Rio: 2008
- Campeonato Carioca Série B1: 2016

Resende

- Copa Rio: 2014
