= Serra Macaense Futebol Clube =

Brazilian football club

Serra Macaense
- Full name: Serra Macaense Futebol Clube
- Nickname: Verdão de Macae
- Founded: December 29, 1992 (as Independente); November 18, 2004 (as Serra Macaense)
- Ground: Moacyrzão
- Capacity: 20.000
- Manager: Valdo
Home colors	Away colors

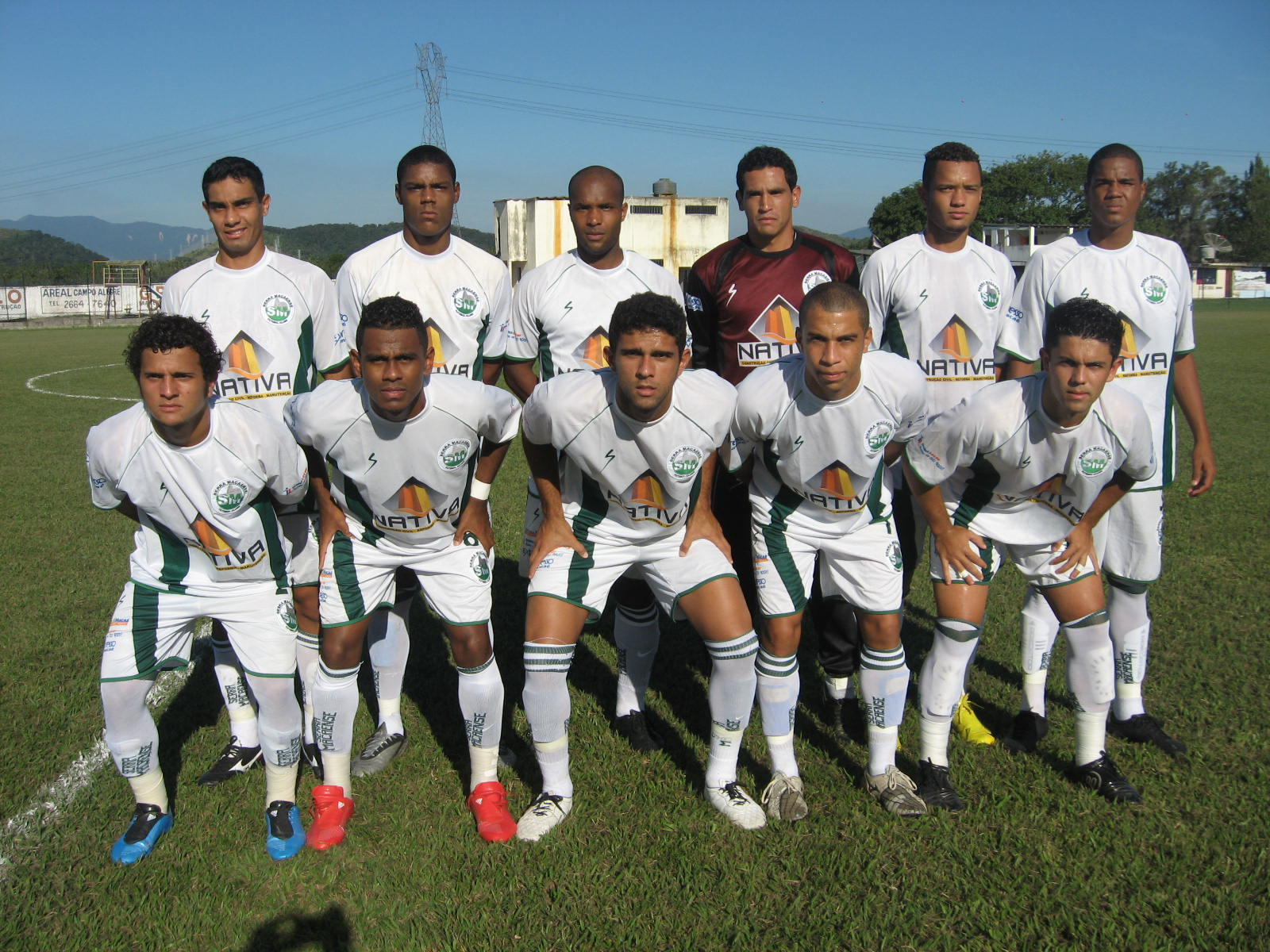
Team photo from the 2010 season

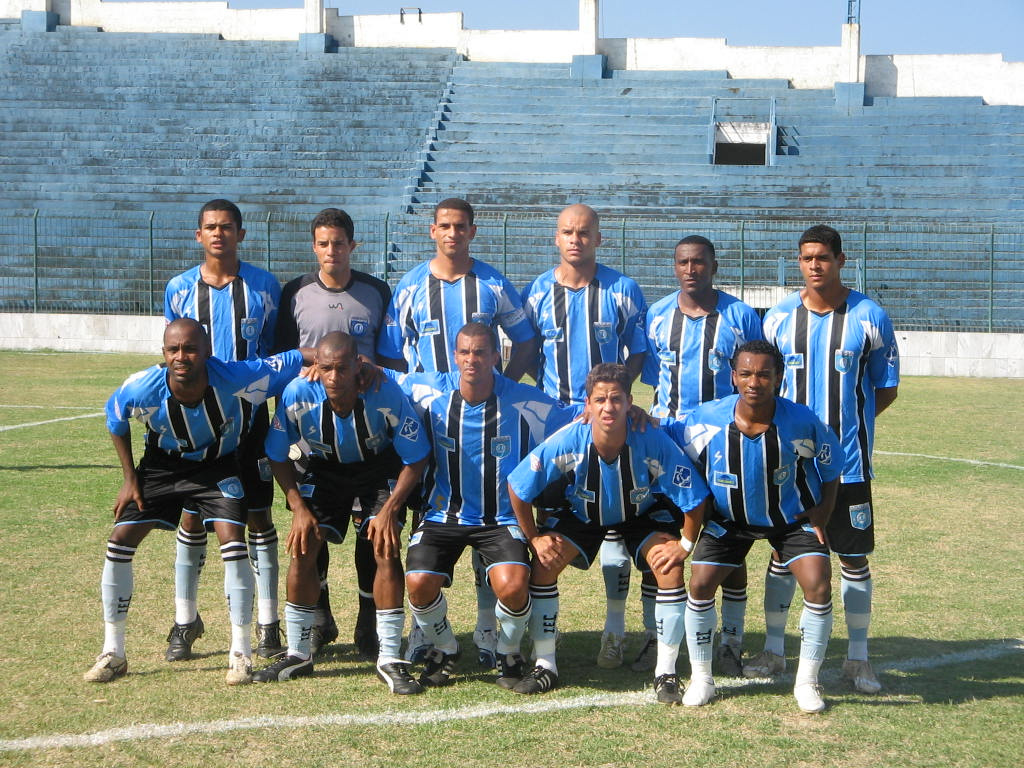
Team photo from the 2007 season

Serra Macaense Futebol Clube, usually known as Serra Macaense, is a team from the city of Macaé, Rio de Janeiro state, founded on December 29, 1992. It was formerly known as Independente Esportes Clube Macaé.

== History ==
The club was founded as Independente Esportes Clube Macaé on December 29, 1992. The club was sold in 2010 and renamed Serra Macaense Futebol Clube.

== Honours ==
- Campeonato Carioca Série B1: 2000

== Colors ==
The official colors are sky blue and black.

== Club kits ==
The home kit is a sky blue and black striped jersey, black shorts and black socks. The away kit is white with details in black and sky blue.
