= Macaé Esporte Futebol Clube =

Brazilian soccer club

Macaé
- Full name: Macaé Esporte Futebol Clube
- Nicknames: O Leão (The Lion); Alvi-Anil (The White & Blue)
- Founded: July 17, 1990 (36 years ago) (as Botafogo F.C.)
- Ground: Moacyrzão
- Capacity: 15,000
- President: Valter Luis Medeiros Bittencourt
- Head coach: Felipe Conceição
- League: Licensed
- 2025: Carioca Série B2, 2nd of 9 (promoted)
- Website: http://macaeesporte.com.br/
Home colors	Away colors

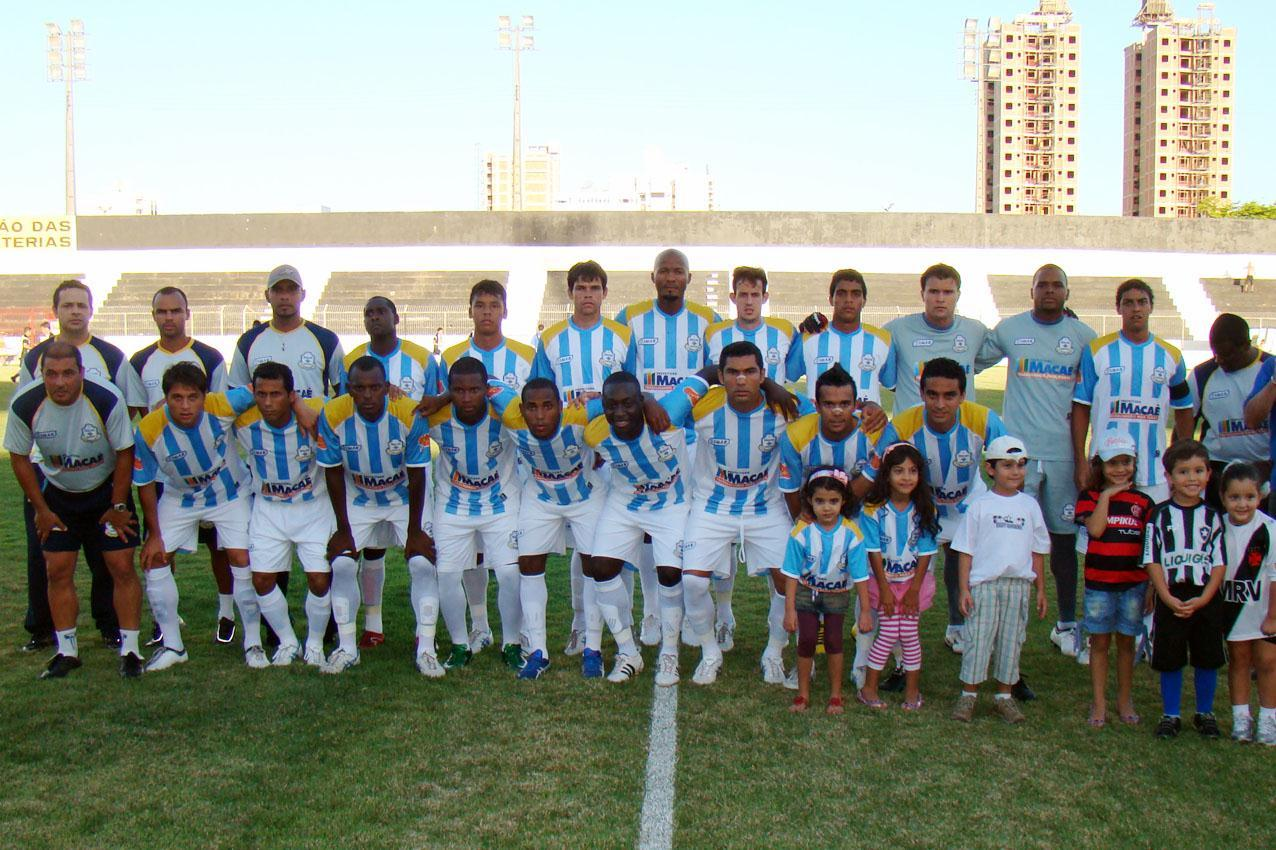
Macaé Esporte Futebol Clube in the 2009 season.

Macaé Esporte Futebol Clube, commonly known as Macaé, is a Brazilian professional football club in Macaé, Rio de Janeiro. The team compete in Campeonato Carioca B1, the third tier of the Rio de Janeiro state football league.

== History ==
The city's most popular team, the Macaé Esporte Futebol Clube was founded on July 17, 1990, as Botafogo Futebol Clube. For eight years, the team only participated in amateur competitions and the first titles came in the middle of the decade, when he became a double champion in the municipality of Macaé (1994 and 1995).

But it was from 1998 that the club began to show its "face" to the State of Rio, when the professionalization took place. And soon in its first season, the then Botafogo conquered the State of the Third Division. In that same year, the team finished runner-up of Copa Rio do Interior and one of the semifinalists of Copa Rio da Capital, being eliminated by Fluminense.

In 1999, already using the fancy name Macaé Sports, the club disputed the State of the Second Division and ended up getting the runner-up. In the year 2000, the club made its second statutory change and, definitively, it was renamed Macaé Esporte Futebol Clube. In 2002, alvianil was close to reaching the elite of Rio de Janeiro, but again it was runner-up in Second Division, a fact that was repeated in 2006. But it was in 2003 that the club entered the national scene, when playing for the first time the Campeonato Brasileiro Série C.

In 2009, the club had one of its best seasons of its history. Macaé was fifth in the Campeonato Carioca, behind only the four majors of the state. The campaign won a place in the Campeonato Brasileiro Série D, a competition in which the club won the runner-up.

But it was in 2014 that Macaé achieved its greatest glory in all its history. In addition to gaining access to Campeonato Brasileiro Série B the following year, he won the Campeonato Brasileiro Série C by drawing 3–3 with Paysandu.

== Stadium ==
Macaé play its home games at Estádio Cláudio Moacyr. The stadium has a maximum capacity of 16,000 people.

== Honours ==
=== Official tournaments ===
National
Competitions	Titles	Seasons
Campeonato Brasileiro Série C	1	2014
State
Competitions	Titles	Seasons
Campeonato Carioca Série B1	1	1998

=== Others tournaments ===
==== City ====
- Campeonato Macaense (2): 1994, 1995
- Torneio Maurício Bittencourt (1): 2005

=== Runners-up ===
- Campeonato Brasileiro Série D (1): 2009
- Copa Rio (1): 2005
- Campeonato Carioca Série A2 (3): 1999, 2002, 2006
- Campeonato Carioca Série B2 (1): 2025

== Current squad ==
As of April 3, 2021

Note: Flags indicate national team as defined under FIFA eligibility rules; some limited exceptions apply. Players may hold more than one non-FIFA nationality.

No.	Pos.	Nation	Player
—	GK	BRA	Jonathan
—	GK	BRA	Milton Raphael
—	GK	BRA	Guilherme
—	GK	BRA	Ricardo Luiz
—	DF	BRA	Ronan
—	DF	BRA	Edson Barba
—	DF	BRA	Pedro Costa
—	DF	BRA	Heltton
—	DF	URU	Álvaro Acevedo
—	DF	BRA	Cléber Gomes
—	DF	BRA	Rossales
—	DF	BRA	Dante
—	DF	BRA	Taira
—	DF	BRA	Edson Alves
—	DF	BRA	Matheus Marcante
—	DF	BRA	Patrick
—	MF	BRA	Amaral
—	MF	BRA	Júnior
—	MF	BRA	Wallacer
—	MF	BRA	Ryckellmy
—	MF	BRA	Dudu

No.	Pos.	Nation	Player
—	MF	BRA	Marquinho
—	MF	BRA	Vitinho
—	MF	BRA	Gilberto
—	MF	BOL	Ricardo Román
—	MF	BRA	Antonio Guilherme
—	MF	BRA	Kaique
—	MF	BRA	Maicon
—	MF	BRA	Eduardo
—	MF	BRA	Fábio Henrique
—	FW	BRA	Richard
—	FW	BRA	Bruno Kiper
—	FW	BRA	Lopeu
—	FW	BRA	Cristiano Junior
—	FW	BRA	Marcelinho
—	FW	BRA	Edy
—	FW	BRA	Jonathan Medeiros
—	FW	BRA	Marcus Vinicius
—	FW	BRA	Pedro Henrique
—	FW	BRA	Robinho
