= Mancini =

Mancini (Italian pronunciation: [manˈtʃiːni]) is a surname of Italian origin which, etymologically, comes from the Italian adjective mancino, which literally means "left handed".

== People ==
=== Art and literature ===
- Antonio Mancini (1852–1930), Italian painter
- Dominic Mancini, 15th-century traveller and author
- Don Mancini (born 1963), author of Child's Play
- Giulio Mancini (1559–1630), 17th-century physician, art collector and writer
- Hannah Mancini (born 1980), American singer who works and lives in Slovenia
- Laura Beatrice Mancini (1821–1869), Italian poet
- Marie Anne Mancini (1649–1714), patroness of La Fontaine

=== Film and television ===
- Al Mancini (1932–2007), American actor, acting teacher and television writer

=== Music ===
- Francesco Mancini (composer) (1672–1737), 18th-century Italian composer
- Giovanni Battista Mancini (1714–1800), Italian voice teacher
- Henry Mancini (1924–1994), Grammy-winning American composer and arranger

=== Politics and governance ===
- Mancini family, Italian noble house
- Alessandro Mancini (born 1975), Captain Regent of San Marino
- Ange Mancini (born 1944), prefect of Martinique
- Giacomo Mancini (1916–2002), Italian politician
- Hortense Mancini (1646–1699), Duchess of Mazarin
- Laura Mancini (1636–1657), mother of Louis Joseph, duc de Vendôme
- Olympia Mancini (1638–1708), lover of Louis XIV and mother of Eugene of Savoy
- Pasquale Stanislao Mancini (1817–1888), Italian politician
- Pia Mancini, Argentine activist
- Remo Mancini (born 1951), Canadian politician
- Joe Manchin (born 1947), American politician from West Virginia whose last name derives from the name Mancini

=== Sports ===
- Mancini (Brazilian footballer) (born 1980), real name Alessandro Faiolhe Amantino, Brazilian football player and former member of Atlético Mineiro
- Alberto Mancini (born 1969), Argentine tennis player
- Anthony Gomez Mancini (born 2001), French professional footballer
- Daniel Mancini (born 1996), Argentine footballer
- Felice Mancini (born 1965), former Italian footballer
  - Andrea Mancini (footballer, born 1996), the son of Felice Mancini, who coached Andrea in the 2010–11 season
- Francesco Mancini (footballer) (1968-2012), Italian football player
- Gianluca Mancini (born 1996), Italian football player
- Marcella Mancini (born 1971), Italian marathon runner
- Ray Mancini (born 1961), American boxer
- Roberto Mancini (born 1964), Italian football manager and former player
  - Filippo Mancini (born 1990), Italian football player, the oldest son of Roberto
  - Andrea Mancini (born 1992), Italian football player, the youngest son of Roberto
- Simone Mancini (born 1999), Italian football player
- Terry Mancini (born 1942), Irish football player
- Tommaso Mancini (born 2004), Italian football player
- Trey Mancini (born Joseph Anthony "Trey" Mancini, in 1992), American baseball player
- Valentín Mancini (born 2003), Argentine footballer
- Vastinho, Vasto Carmo Mancini (1934–2018), Brazilian football player
  - Vagner Mancini (born 1966), Brazilian football player and manager, son of Vastinho
  - Matheus Mancini (born 1994), Brazilian football player, son of Vagner and grandson of Vastinho
- Victor Mancini (born 2002), professional ice hockey player

== Fictional characters ==
- Cindy Mancini, the love interest of the protagonist of the movie Can't Buy Me Love (1987).
- Lucy Mancini, a character in The Godfather. She was the Maid of Honor at Connie Corleone's wedding and had an affair with Sonny Corleone; in The Godfather Part III, it is revealed she had conceived a child, Vincent Santino Mancini
- Michael Mancini, character on Melrose Place (1992–1999) (2009)
- Vincent Mancini, illegitimate child of Sonny Corleone and Lucy Mancini, featured in The Godfather Part III

== Other uses ==
- Mancini immunodiffusion technique, or radial immunodiffusion
