= 2024 CR Flamengo season =

Flamengo
2024 season
- President: Rodolfo Landim
- Head coach: Tite (until 30 September 2024); Filipe Luís (since 30 September 2024)
- Stadium: Maracanã
- Série A: 3rd
- Campeonato Carioca: Winners
- Copa do Brasil: Winners
- Copa Libertadores: Quarter-finals
- Top goalscorer: League: Pedro (11 goals); All: Pedro (30 goals)
- Highest home attendance: 67,459 (3 November 2024 vs Atlético Mineiro, Copa do Brasil)
- Lowest home attendance: 28,708 (30 September 2024 vs Athletico Paranaense, Série A)
- Average home league attendance: 54,447
Home colours	Away colours	Third colours

The 2024 season was Clube de Regatas do Flamengo's 129th year of existence, their 113th football season, and their 54th in the Campeonato Brasileiro Série A, having never been relegated from the top division. In addition to the 2024 Campeonato Brasileiro Série A, Flamengo also competed in the CONMEBOL Copa Libertadores, the Copa do Brasil, and the Campeonato Carioca, the top tier of Rio de Janeiro's state football.

== Kits ==
The 2024 home kit has been unveiled on 26 January. The shirt marks the return of black as the predominant color and the option of long sleeves, not used since the 2017 kits. For the first time in the club's history, the red stripes decrease along the length of the shirt. It was debuted in a 2024 FC Series match against Orlando City SC.

Supplier: Adidas
Sponsors: PixBet (Main sponsor) / Mercado Livre (Back of the shirt) / Assist Card (Lower back) / Banco BRB (Shoulder) / Kwai (Sleeves) / ABC da Construção (Shorts) / Zé Delivery (Socks)

Home	Home alternate	Away	Away alternate	Third
Goalkeeper	Goalkeeper alternate	Goalkeeper alternate 2	Goalkeeper alternate 3

== Competitions ==
=== Overview ===
Competition	First match	Last match	Starting round	Final position	Record							
Competition	First match	Last match	Starting round	Final position	Pld	W	D	L	GF	GA	GD	Win %
Série A	14 April 2024	8 December 2024	Matchday 1	3rd	38	20	10	8	61	42	+19	52.63
Copa do Brasil	1 May 2024	10 November 2024	Third round	Winners	10	8	1	1	11	2	+9	80.00
Campeonato Carioca	17 January 2024	7 April 2024	Matchday 1	Winners	15	11	4	0	29	1	+28	73.33
Copa Libertadores	2 April 2024	26 September 2024	Group stage	Quarter-finals	10	4	2	4	13	6	+7	40.00
Total					73	43	17	13	114	51	+63	58.90

Source: Competitions

=== Pre-Season friendlies ===
Goals, assists and red cards are shown.

21 January 2024 FC Series 2024	Philadelphia Union (United States)	0–2	(Brazil) Flamengo	St. Petersburg, United States
16:00 UTC−3			Pedro 13' (pen.); Everton	Stadium: AI Lang Stadium

27 January 2024 FC Series 2024	Orlando City SC (United States)	1–1	(Brazil) Flamengo	Orlando, United States
16:00 UTC−3	Angulo 41' (Lodeiro)		Pedro 13' (Varela)	Stadium: Inter&Co Stadium

=== Campeonato Carioca ===
==== Taça Guanabara table ====
Pos	Team	Pld	W	D	L	GF	GA	GD	Pts	Qualification
1	Flamengo (C)	11	8	3	0	23	1	+22	27	Taça Guanabara Champion and advance to semifinals
2	Nova Iguaçu	11	7	3	1	18	13	+5	24	Advance to semifinals
3	Vasco da Gama	11	6	4	1	20	10	+10	22	Advance to semifinals
4	Fluminense	11	6	3	2	17	11	+6	21	Advance to semifinals
5	Botafogo	11	6	2	3	19	11	+8	20	Advance to Taça Rio semifinals
6	Boavista	11	5	3	3	18	21	−3	18	Advance to Taça Rio semifinals
7	Portuguesa	11	3	5	3	9	12	−3	14	Advance to Taça Rio semifinals
8	Sampaio Corrêa	11	3	1	7	14	17	−3	10	Advance to Taça Rio semifinals
9	Madureira	11	3	1	7	9	13	−4	10	
10	Volta Redonda	11	2	3	6	12	19	−7	9	
11	Bangu	11	2	2	7	12	24	−12	8	
12	Audax Rio (R)	11	0	0	11	1	20	−19	0	Relegated

Source: FERJ
Rules for classification: 1) points; 2) wins; 3) goal difference; 4) goals scored; 5) head-to-head results; 6) disciplinary record; 7) random draw.
(C) Champions; (R) Relegated

==== Matches ====
Goals, assists and red cards are shown.

17 January 2024 1	Flamengo	4–0	Audax Rio	Manaus
21:30 UTC−3	Pereira 3' (de Arrascaeta); Pedro; Everton 42'; Varela 49'	Report		Stadium: Arena da Amazônia; Attendance: 44,068; Referee: Alex Gomes Stefano

21 January 2024 2	Nova Iguaçu	1–1	Flamengo	João Pessoa
18:10 UTC−3	Carlinhos 40'	Report	Thiaguinho; Thiaguinho (yellow card) 73' (yellow-red card) 90+2'	Stadium: Almeidão; Attendance: 16,428; Referee: Jodis Nascimento de Souza

27 January 2024 4	Portuguesa	0–0	Flamengo	Natal
18:10 UTC−3		Report		Stadium: Arena das Dunas; Attendance: 25,418; Referee: Thiago da Silva Ludugério

31 January 2024 5	Sampaio Corrêa	0–2	Flamengo	Belém
21:30 UTC−3		Report	Bruno Henrique 10'; Gabriel 45' (de Arrascaeta)	Stadium: Mangueirão; Attendance: 49,112; Referee: Carlos Tadeu Ferreira de Castro

4 February 2024 6 Clássico dos Milhões	Vasco da Gama	0–0	Flamengo	Rio de Janeiro
19:00 UTC−3		Report		Stadium: Maracanã; Attendance: 56,318; Referee: Wagner do Nascimento Magalhães

7 February 2024 7 Clássico da Rivalidade	Flamengo	1–0	Botafogo	Rio de Janeiro
21:30 UTC−3	Pereira 90+9' (Ayrton Lucas)	Report		Stadium: Maracanã; Attendance: 46,798; Referee: Yuri Elino Ferreira da Cruz

10 February 2024 3	Flamengo	3–0	Volta Redonda	Rio de Janeiro
16:00 UTC−3	Gabriel 9' (L. Araújo); Pedro 87' (pen.); Ayrton Lucas 90+5' (de Arrascaeta)	Report		Stadium: Maracanã; Attendance: 42,373; Referee: Felipe da Silva Gonçalves Paludo

15 February 2024 8	Bangu	0–3	Flamengo	Aracaju
21:30 UTC−3		Report	Pedro 25' (de Arrascaeta), 58' (L. Araújo), 77'	Stadium: Batistão; Attendance: 15,275; Referee: Jodis Nascimento de Souza

20 February 2024 9	Flamengo	4–0	Boavista	Rio de Janeiro
21:30 UTC−3	L. Araújo; Pedro 13' (Everton); de Arrascaeta 70', 86' (de la Cruz)	Report		Stadium: Maracanã; Attendance: 35,713; Referee: Alex Gomes Stefano

25 February 2024 10 Fla–Flu	Flamengo	2–0	Fluminense	Rio de Janeiro
16:00 UTC−3	Pedro 53' (Ayrton Lucas); Everton	Report		Stadium: Maracanã; Attendance: 55,401; Referee: Yuri Elino Ferreira da Cruz

2 March 2024 11	Flamengo	3–0	Madureira	Rio de Janeiro
16:00 UTC−3	de Arrascaeta; Pedro 52'; Pereira 69'	Report		Stadium: Maracanã; Attendance: 63,422; Referee: Bruno Mota Correia

==== Semi-finals ====
9 March 2024 First leg Fla–Flu	Fluminense	0–2	Flamengo	Rio de Janeiro
21:00 UTC−3	Santos (red card) 63'	Report	Everton 45+2' (Pulgar); Pedro 90+4' (de Arrascaeta)	Stadium: Maracanã; Attendance: 52,169; Referee: Yuri Elino Ferreira da Cruz

16 March 2024 Second leg Fla–Flu	Flamengo	0–0 (2–0 agg.)	Fluminense	Rio de Janeiro
21:00 UTC−3		Report		Stadium: Maracanã; Attendance: 56,261; Referee: Wagner do Nascimento Magalhães

==== Finals ====
30 March 2024 First leg	Nova Iguaçu	0–3	Flamengo	Rio de Janeiro
17:00 UTC−3		Report	Pedro 30' (pen.), 53' (Everton); Ronald 80' (o.g.)	Stadium: Maracanã; Attendance: 43,778; Referee: Alex Gomes Stefano

7 April 2024 Second leg	Flamengo	1–0 (4–0 agg.)	Nova Iguaçu	Rio de Janeiro
17:00 UTC−3	Bruno Henrique 74' (Ayrton Lucas)	Report		Stadium: Maracanã; Attendance: 65,757; Referee: Bruno Mota Correia

=== Copa Libertadores ===
The draw for the group stage was held on 18 March 2024 on the CONMEBOL headquarters in Luque, Paraguay.

==== Group stage ====
Pos	Team	Pld	W	D	L	GF	GA	GD	Pts	Qualification	BOL	FLA	PAL	MIL
1	(Bolivia) Bolívar	6	4	1	1	13	9	+4	13	Advance to round of 16	—	2–1	3–1	3–2
2	(Brazil) Flamengo	6	3	1	2	11	4	+7	10	Advance to round of 16	4–0	—	2–0	3–0
3	(Chile) Palestino	6	2	1	3	6	11	−5	7	Transfer to Copa Sudamericana	0–4	1–0	—	3–1
4	(Colombia) Millonarios	6	0	3	3	6	12	−6	3		1–1	1–1	1–1	—

Source: CONMEBOL
Rules for classification: 1) Points; 2) Goal difference; 3) Goals scored; 4) Away goals scored; 5) CONMEBOL ranking.

Goals, assists and red cards are shown.

2 April 2024 1	Millonarios (Colombia)	1–1	(Brazil) Flamengo	Bogotá, Colombia
19:00 UTC−3	Vásquez (red card) 61'; Ruiz 80' (Rodríguez)	Report	Pedro 64' (pen.)	Stadium: El Campín; Attendance: 22,205; Referee: Darío Herrera (Argentina)

10 April 2024 2	Flamengo (Brazil)	2–0	(Chile) Palestino	Rio de Janeiro, Brazil
21:30 UTC−3	Pedro 21'; Ortiz	Report		Stadium: Maracanã; Attendance: 58,597; Referee: Facundo Tello (Argentina)

24 April 2024 3	Bolívar (Bolivia)	2–1	(Brazil) Flamengo	La Paz, Bolivia
21:30 UTC−3	da Costa 2' (Bruno Sávio); Bruno Sávio 62' (Saucedo)	Report	Viña	Stadium: Hernando Siles; Attendance: 22,620; Referee: Alexis Herrera (Venezuela)

7 May 2024 4	Palestino (Chile)	1–0	(Brazil) Flamengo	Rancagua, Chile
21:00 UTC−3	Cornejo 63'	Report		Stadium: Municipal Francisco Sánchez Rumoroso; Attendance: 4,217; Referee: Esteban Ostojich (Uruguay)
Note: Palestino played their home match against Flamengo at Estadio Municipal Francisco Sánchez Rumoroso, Coquimbo instead of their regular stadium Estadio Municipal de La Cisterna, Santiago which did not meet CONMEBOL requirements.

15 May 2024 5	Flamengo (Brazil)	4–0	(Bolivia) Bolívar	Rio de Janeiro, Brazil
21:30 UTC−3	Gerson 1' (Everton); Ayrton Lucas 38'; Everton; Pedro	Report		Stadium: Maracanã; Attendance: 63,169; Referee: Andrés Matonte (Uruguay)

28 May 2024 6	Flamengo (Brazil)	3–0	(Colombia) Millonarios	Rio de Janeiro, Brazil
21:30 UTC−3	Pedro 7', 44' (Viña); Vargas 25' (o.g.); Bruno Henrique (red card) 87'	Report		Stadium: Maracanã; Attendance: 64,268; Referee: Facundo Tello (Argentina)

==== Round of 16 ====
The draw for the round of 16 was held on 3 June 2024.

Goals, assists and red cards are shown.

15 August 2024 1st leg	Flamengo (Brazil)	2–0	(Bolivia) Bolívar	Rio de Janeiro, Brazil
21:30 UTC−3	Araújo; Pereira 89' (Araújo)	Report		Stadium: Maracanã; Attendance: 65,381; Referee: Wilmar Roldán (Colombia)

22 August 2024 2nd leg	Bolívar (Bolivia)	1–0 (1–2 agg.)	(Brazil) Flamengo	La Paz, Bolivia
21:30 UTC−3	Bruno Sávio; Anderson (yellow card) 47' (yellow-red card) 89'	Report		Stadium: Hernando Siles; Attendance: 29,168; Referee: Yael Falcón Pérez (Argentina)

==== Quarter-finals ====
Goals, assists and red cards are shown.

19 September 2024 1st leg	Flamengo (Brazil)	0–1	(Uruguay) Peñarol	Rio de Janeiro, Brazil
19:00 UTC−3		Report	Cabrera 13' (Silvera)	Stadium: Maracanã; Attendance: 64,396; Referee: Jesús Valenzuela (Venezuela)

26 September 2024 2nd leg	Peñarol (Uruguay)	0–0 (1–0 agg.)	(Brazil) Flamengo	Montevideo, Uruguay
19:00 UTC−3		Report		Stadium: Campeón del Siglo; Attendance: 38,144; Referee: Facundo Tello (Argentina)

=== Campeonato Brasileiro ===
==== League table ====
Pos	Team	Pld	W	D	L	GF	GA	GD	Pts	Qualification or relegation
1	Botafogo (C)	38	23	10	5	59	29	+30	79	Qualification for Copa Libertadores group stage (Note: Botafogo and Flamengo qualified for the Copa Libertadores group stage by winning the 2024 Copa Libertadores and the 2024 Copa do Brasil, respectively.)
2	Palmeiras	38	22	7	9	60	33	+27	73	Qualification for Copa Libertadores group stage
3	Flamengo	38	20	10	8	61	42	+19	70	Qualification for Copa Libertadores group stage
4	Fortaleza	38	19	11	8	53	39	+14	68	Qualification for Copa Libertadores group stage
5	Internacional	38	18	11	9	53	36	+17	65	Qualification for Copa Libertadores group stage

Source: CBF
Rules for classification: 1) points; 2) wins; 3) goal difference; 4) goals scored; 5) head-to-head results (only between two teams); 6) fewest red cards; 7) fewest yellow cards; 8) drawing of lots.
(C) Champions

==== Results by round ====
Round	1	2	3	4	5	6	7	8	9	10	11	12	13	14	15	16	17	18	19	20	21	22	23	24	25	26	27	28	29	30	31	32	33	34	35	36	37	38
Ground	A	H	A	H	A	H	A	H	A	H	A	A	H	A	H	H	H	A	H	A	H	A	H	A	H	A	H	A	H	H	A	A	H	A	A	H	A	H
Result	W	W	D	L	D	W	W	W	D	W	W	L	W	W	D	L	W	W	W	L	D	L	W	L	D	L	W	W	L	W	D	W	D	W	D	W	W	D
Position	3	1	2	8	7	3	1	1	2	1	1	1	1	1	1	3	3	2	1	2	3	4	4	4	4	4	4	4	4	4	4	4	4	4	5	3	3	3
Points	3	6	7	7	8	11	14	17	18	21	24	24	27	30	31	31	34	37	40	40	41	41	44	44	45	45	48	51	51	54	55	58	59	62	63	66	69	70

Source: Matches
A = Away; H = Home; W = Win; D = Draw; L = Loss; P = Postponed

==== Matches ====
Goals, assists and red cards are shown.

14 April 2024 1	Atlético Goianiense	1–2	Flamengo	Goiânia
16:00 UTC−3	Luiz Fernando 63' (Maguinho); Shaylon (penalty missed) 71' (pen.); Ventura (HC) (red card) 14'; Alix Vinicius (red card) 45+2'; Maguinho (red card) 90+11'	Report	de la Cruz 45+6'; Pedro 90+13' (pen.)	Stadium: Serra Dourada; Attendance: 35,195; Referee: André Luiz Skettino Policarpo Bento

17 April 2024 2	Flamengo	2–1	São Paulo	Rio de Janeiro
21:30 UTC−3	L. Araújo 20' (de la Cruz); de la Cruz 54'	Report	Ferreira	Stadium: Maracanã; Attendance: 48,103; Referee: Anderson Daronco

21 April 2024 3	Palmeiras	0–0	Flamengo	São Paulo
16:00 UTC−3		Report		Stadium: Allianz Parque; Attendance: 29,956; Referee: Rodrigo José Pereira de Lima

28 April 2024 4 Clássico da Rivalidade	Flamengo	0–2	Botafogo	Rio de Janeiro
11:00 UTC−3		Report	Luiz Henrique 53' (Savarino); Savarino 90+3' (Jeffinho)	Stadium: Maracanã; Attendance: 53,683; Referee: Raphael Claus

4 May 2024 5	Red Bull Bragantino	1–1	Flamengo	Bragança Paulista
18:30 UTC−3	Pedro Henrique	Report	Bruno Henrique 79' (de la Cruz)	Stadium: Nabi Abi Chedid; Attendance: 9,971; Referee: Paulo Cesar Zanovelli da Silva

11 May 2024 6	Flamengo	2–0	Corinthians	Rio de Janeiro
16:00 UTC−3	Pedro; Lorran	Report		Stadium: Maracanã; Attendance: 56,929; Referee: Ramon Abatti Abel

2 June 2024 7 Clássico dos Milhões	Vasco da Gama	1–6	Flamengo	Rio de Janeiro
16:00 UTC−3	Vegetti; João Victor (red card) 45+4'	Report	Everton 28' (de Arrascaeta); Pedro 33' (Everton); David Luiz 43' (Everton); de Arrascaeta; Bruno Henrique 73' (de Arrascaeta); Gabriel 89' (Wesley)	Stadium: Maracanã; Attendance: 62,228; Referee: Bráulio da Silva Machado
Note: Match postponed due to the 2024 Rio Grande do Sul floods.

13 June 2024 8	Flamengo	2–1	Grêmio	Rio de Janeiro
20:00 UTC−3	L. Araújo	Report	Edenilson 90+6' (Kannemann)	Stadium: Maracanã; Attendance: 51,785; Referee: Luiz Flávio de Oliveira
Note: Match postponed due to the 2024 Rio Grande do Sul floods.

16 June 2024 9	Athletico Paranaense	1–1	Flamengo	Curitiba
16:00 UTC−3	Fernandinho 90+2' (pen.); Cuca (HC) (red card) 90+10'	Report	E. Araújo 90+9' (L. Araújo)	Stadium: Ligga Arena; Attendance: 38,641; Referee: Anderson Daronco

20 June 2024 10	Flamengo	2–1	Bahia	Rio de Janeiro
20:00 UTC−3	Gerson; David Luiz	Report	Everaldo	Stadium: Maracanã; Attendance: 49,909; Referee: Bráulio da Silva Machado

23 June 2024 11 Fla–Flu	Fluminense	0–1	Flamengo	Rio de Janeiro
16:00 UTC−3	Lima (yellow card) 86' (yellow-red card) 88'; Diniz (HC) (red card) 89'	Report	Pedro 86' (pen.)	Stadium: Maracanã; Attendance: 57,098; Referee: Rafael Rodrigo Klein

26 June 2024 12	Juventude	2–1	Flamengo	Caxias do Sul
20:00 UTC−3	Barbosa; Mandaca	Report	Pedro 19' (L. Araújo)	Stadium: Alfredo Jaconi; Attendance: 12,685; Referee: Matheus Delgado Candançan

30 June 2024 13	Flamengo	2–1	Cruzeiro	Rio de Janeiro
18:30 UTC−3	Pedro; Fabrício Bruno 65' (L. Araújo)	Report	Pereira	Stadium: Maracanã; Attendance: 56,263; Referee: Bráulio da Silva Machado

3 July 2024 14 Flamengo Atlético-MG rivalry	Atlético Mineiro	2–4	Flamengo	Belo Horizonte
21:30 UTC−3	Hulk 57' (pen.), 90' (Scarpa); Paulo Vitor (yellow card) 49' (yellow-red card) 63'	Report	Bruno Henrique; Carlinhos 24'; Ayrton Lucas 51' (Ortiz)	Stadium: Arena MRV; Attendance: 39,993; Referee: Ramon Abatti Abel

6 July 2024 15	Flamengo	1–1	Cuiabá	Rio de Janeiro
20:00 UTC−3	Pedro 60' (Ayrton Lucas)	Report	Derik	Stadium: Maracanã; Attendance: 54,948; Referee: Rodrigo José Pereira de Lima

11 July 2024 16	Flamengo	1–2	Fortaleza	Rio de Janeiro
20:00 UTC−3	Pedro 39' (pen.)	Report	Wesley 11' (o.g.); Lucero 63' (Pochettino)	Stadium: Maracanã; Attendance: 57,517; Referee: Edina Alves Batista

20 July 2024 18	Flamengo	2–1	Criciúma	Brasília
16:00 UTC−3	Pedro (penalty missed) 64' (pen.), 76' (de Arrascaeta); Gabriel 89' (pen.)	Report	Rodrigo 35'; Allano (yellow card) 62' (yellow-red card) 90'	Stadium: Arena BRB Mané Garrincha; Attendance: 60,127; Referee: Maguielson Lima Barbosa

24 July 2024 19	Vitória	1–2	Flamengo	Salvador
20:00 UTC−3	Everaldo 75' (Zé Hugo)	Report	de Arrascaeta; Carlinhos 90' (Gabriel)	Stadium: Barradão; Attendance: 30,509; Referee: Raphael Claus

28 July 2024 20	Flamengo	2–0	Atlético Goianiense	Rio de Janeiro
16:00 UTC−3	Pedro 19' (de Arrascaeta); de Arrascaeta 61' (Ayrton Lucas)	Report		Stadium: Maracanã; Attendance: 61,883; Referee: Gustavo Ervino Bauermann

3 August 2024 21	São Paulo	1–0	Flamengo	São Paulo
21:30 UTC−3	Calleri 61' (Rato)	Report		Stadium: MorumBIS; Attendance: 58,065; Referee: Rafael Rodrigo Klein

11 August 2024 22	Flamengo	1–1	Palmeiras	Rio de Janeiro
16:00 UTC−3	de Arrascaeta 69'	Report	Murilo (yellow card) 42' (yellow-red card) 90+3'; Luighi 86'	Stadium: Maracanã; Attendance: 55,051; Referee: Wilton Pereira Sampaio

18 August 2024 23 Clássico da Rivalidade	Botafogo	4–1	Flamengo	Rio de Janeiro
18:30 UTC−3	Ponte 3' (Freitas); Jesus 54'; Almada (penalty missed) 68' (pen.); Martins	Report	Bruno Henrique 24' (Ortiz)	Stadium: Nilton Santos; Attendance: 25,888; Referee: Bruno Arleu de Araújo

25 August 2024 24	Flamengo	2–1	Red Bull Bragantino	Rio de Janeiro
20:00 UTC−3	Michael 16' (Araújo); Raul 59' (o.g.)	Report	Mendes 57'	Stadium: Maracanã; Attendance: 30,225; Referee: Gustavo Ervino Bauermann

1 September 2024 25	Corinthians	2–1	Flamengo	São Paulo
16:00 UTC−3	Talles Magno 26' (Yuri Alberto); Romero 60'; Yuri Alberto (red card) 90+5'; Cacá (red card) 90+11'	Report	Pedro 37' (pen.); Alcaraz (red card) 90+11'	Stadium: Neo Química Arena; Attendance: 45,635; Referee: Ramon Abatti Abel

15 September 2024 26 Clássico dos Milhões	Flamengo	1–1	Vasco da Gama	Rio de Janeiro
18:30 UTC−3	Gerson 72' (de Arrascaeta)	Report	Coutinho	Stadium: Maracanã; Attendance: 63,830; Referee: Raphael Claus

22 September 2024 27	Grêmio	3–2	Flamengo	Porto Alegre
18:30 UTC−3	Cristaldo; Braithwaite 55'; Costa 85' (Edenilson)	Report	Gonçalves 25' (Alcaraz); Teresa 90'; Carlinhos (red card) 58'	Stadium: Arena do Grêmio; Attendance: 18,049; Referee: Matheus Delgado Candançan

29 September 2024 28	Flamengo	1–0	Athletico Paranaense	Rio de Janeiro
20:00 UTC−3	Gerson 90' (Wesley)	Report		Stadium: Maracanã; Attendance: 28,708; Referee: Davi de Oliveira Lacerda

5 October 2024 29	Bahia	0–2	Flamengo	Salvador
16:30 UTC−3	Arias (red card) 90+11'	Report	Ayrton Lucas 35'; Alcaraz 90+12' (pen.)	Stadium: Casa de Apostas Arena Fonte Nova; Attendance: 43,433; Referee: Rafael Rodrigo Klein

17 October 2024 30 Fla–Flu	Flamengo	0–2	Fluminense	Rio de Janeiro
20:00 UTC−3		Report	Ganso (penalty missed) 45+4' (pen.); Lima 50' (Kauã Elias); Arias 60' (Martinelli)	Stadium: Maracanã; Attendance: 58,117; Referee: Raphael Claus

26 October 2024 31	Flamengo	4–2	Juventude	Rio de Janeiro
16:30 UTC−3	Michael 8'; Gabriel 49' (pen.); de Arrascaeta; Plata	Report	Gilberto; Edson Carioca 70' (Boza); Nenê (yellow card) 76' (yellow-red card) 76'	Stadium: Maracanã; Attendance: 60,286; Referee: Bráulio da Silva Machado

30 October 2024 17	Internacional	1–1	Flamengo	Porto Alegre
19:00 UTC−3	Valencia	Report	Alcaraz 45+3' (pen.)	Stadium: Beira-Rio; Attendance: 43,729; Referee: Davi de Oliveira Lacerda
Note: Match originally scheduled to 14 July 2024.

6 November 2024 32	Cruzeiro	0–1	Flamengo	Belo Horizonte
21:00 UTC−3		Report	David Luiz 53'; Allan (yellow card) 80' (yellow-red card) 90+4'	Stadium: Arena Independência; Attendance: 20,855; Referee: Gustavo Ervino Bauermann

13 November 2024 33 Flamengo Atlético-MG rivalry	Flamengo	0–0	Atlético Mineiro	Rio de Janeiro
20:00 UTC−3	David Luiz (penalty missed) 36' (pen.)	Report		Stadium: Maracanã; Attendance: 63,441; Referee: Davi de Oliveira Lacerda

20 November 2024 34	Cuiabá	1–2	Flamengo	Cuiabá
19:00 UTC−3	Derik 59' (Clayson)	Report	Guilherme; Gonçalves	Stadium: Arena Pantanal; Attendance: 12,891; Referee: Edina Alves Batista

26 November 2024 35	Fortaleza	0–0	Flamengo	Fortaleza
20:00 UTC−3		Report	Pulgar (yellow card) 24' (yellow-red card) 67'	Stadium: Arena Castelão; Attendance: 57,624; Referee: Anderson Daronco

1 December 2024 36	Flamengo	3–2	Internacional	Rio de Janeiro
16:00 UTC−3	Ortiz 29' (de la Cruz); Michael 37' (Alex Sandro), 41'	Report	Wesley 55' (Valencia); Valencia 62' (Bernabei)	Stadium: Maracanã; Attendance: 56,571; Referee: Rodrigo José Pereira de Lima

4 December 2024 37	Criciúma	0–3	Flamengo	Criciúma
20:00 UTC−3		Report	Varela 45' (Ayrton Lucas); Bruno Henrique 71' (pen.); L. Araújo 84' (Pulgar)	Stadium: Heriberto Hülse; Attendance: 18,849; Referee: Wilton Pereira Sampaio

8 December 2024 38	Flamengo	2–2	Vitória	Rio de Janeiro
16:00 UTC−3	Gabriel 59' (Pulgar); Ayrton Lucas 79' (Pulgar)	Report	Alerrandro; Janderson 74'	Stadium: Maracanã; Attendance: 67,113; Referee: Lucas Casagrande

=== Copa do Brasil ===
As Flamengo will participate in the 2024 Copa Libertadores, the club entered the Copa do Brasil in the third round.

==== Third round ====
Goals, assists and red cards are shown.

1 May 2024 1st leg	Flamengo	1–0	Amazonas	Rio de Janeiro
21:30 UTC−3	Pedro 20' (Viña)	Report		Stadium: Maracanã; Attendance: 39,015; Referee: Emerson Ricardo de Almeida Andrade

22 May 2024 2nd leg	Amazonas	0–1 (0–2 agg.)	Flamengo	Manaus
21:30 UTC−3		Report	Pedro	Stadium: Arena da Amazônia; Attendance: 22,948; Referee: Ramon Abatti Abel

==== Round of 16 ====
Goals, assists and red cards are shown.

31 July 2024 1st leg	Flamengo	2–0	Palmeiras	Rio de Janeiro
20:00 UTC−3	Pedro 57' (Araújo); Araújo 73' (de la Cruz)	Report		Stadium: Maracanã; Attendance: 64,706; Referee: Bráulio da Silva Machado

7 August 2024 2nd leg	Palmeiras	1–0 (1–2 agg.)	Flamengo	São Paulo
20:00 UTC−3	Reis 7' (Caio); Ferreira (HC) (red card) 87'	Report		Stadium: Allianz Parque; Attendance: 38,463; Referee: Anderson Daronco

==== Quarterfinals ====
Goals, assists and red cards are shown.

28 August 2024 1st leg	Bahia	0–1	Flamengo	Salvador
21:30 UTC−3		Report	Bruno Henrique 50' (de la Cruz)	Stadium: Casa de Apostas Arena Fonte Nova; Attendance: 46,534; Referee: Raphael Claus

12 September 2024 2nd leg	Flamengo	1–0 (2–0 agg.)	Bahia	Rio de Janeiro
21:45 UTC−3	de Arrascaeta	Report		Stadium: Maracanã; Attendance: 65,662; Referee: Bráulio da Silva Machado

==== Semifinals ====
Goals, assists and red cards are shown.

2 October 2024 1st leg	Flamengo	1–0	Corinthians	Rio de Janeiro
21:45 UTC−3	Alex Sandro	Report		Stadium: Maracanã; Attendance: 47,052; Referee: Wilton Pereira Sampaio

20 October 2024 2nd leg	Corinthians	0–0 (0–1 agg.)	Flamengo	São Paulo
16:00 UTC−3		Report	Bruno Henrique (red card) 28'	Stadium: Neo Química Arena; Attendance: 46,420; Referee: Anderson Daronco

==== Finals ====
Goals, assists and red cards are shown.

3 November 2024 1st leg Flamengo Atlético-MG rivalry	Flamengo	3–1	Atlético Mineiro	Rio de Janeiro
16:00 UTC−3	de Arrascaeta 11'; Gabriel 39' (Plata), 74' (Alcaraz)	Report	Alan Kardec 80'	Stadium: Maracanã; Attendance: 67,459; Referee: Rafael Rodrigo Klein

10 November 2024 2nd leg Flamengo Atlético-MG rivalry	Atlético Mineiro	0–1 (1–4 agg.)	Flamengo	Belo Horizonte
16:00 UTC−3	Saravia (red card) 90+6'	Report	Plata	Stadium: Arena MRV; Attendance: 44,876; Referee: Raphael Claus

== Management team ==
As of 30 September 2023.

Position	Name
Coaching staff
Head coach	(Brazil) Filipe Luís
Assistant head coach	(Spain) Ivan Palanco
Assistant head coach	(Brazil) Márcio de Moraes Torres
Assistant head coach	(Brazil) André Alegria
Assistant head coach	(Brazil) Vinícius Bergantin
Goalkeepers trainer	(Brazil) Rogério Maia
Goalkeepers trainer	(Brazil) Thiago Eller
Performance analyst	(Brazil) Lucas Oliveira
Performance analyst	(Brazil) Wellington Sales
Performance analyst	(Brazil) Eduardo Coimbra
Performance analyst	(Brazil) Daniel Motta
Performance analyst	(Brazil) Henrique Américo
Coordinator	(Brazil) Gabriel Andreata
Medical staff
Fitness coach	(Brazil) Diogo Linhares
Health and high performance manager	(Brazil) Marcio Tannure
Doctor	(Brazil) Marcelo Soares
Doctor	(Brazil) Fernando Bassan
Physiotherapist	(Brazil) Mario Peixoto
Physiotherapist	(Brazil) Marcio Puglia
Physiotherapist	(Brazil) Laniyan Neves
Physiotherapist	(Brazil) Alam Santos
Physiotherapist	(Brazil) Fábio Feitosa

== Roster ==
List of currently full members of the professional team, youth players are also often used.

As of 6 December 2024

No.	Pos.	Name	Date of birth (age)	Signed in	Contract end	Signed from	Transfer fee	Notes
Goalkeepers
1	GK	(Argentina) Agustín Rossi	21 August 1995 (aged 29)	2023	2027	(Argentina) Boca Juniors	Free	
25	GK	(Brazil) Matheus Cunha	24 May 2001 (aged 23)	2022	2025	Youth system		
Defenders
2	RB	(Uruguay) Guillermo Varela	24 March 1993 (aged 31)	2022	2025	(Russia) Dynamo Moscow	Free	
3	CB	(Brazil) Léo Ortiz	3 January 1996 (aged 28)	2024	2028	(Brazil) Red Bull Bragantino	€7m	
4	CB	(Brazil) Léo Pereira	31 January 1996 (aged 28)	2020	2027	(Brazil) Athletico Paranaense	€6.1m	
6	LB	(Brazil) Ayrton Lucas	19 June 1997 (aged 27)	2022	2027	(Russia) Spartak Moscow	€7m	
15	CB	(Brazil) Fabrício Bruno	12 February 1996 (aged 28)	2022	2028	(Brazil) Red Bull Bragantino	€2.5m	
17	LB	(Uruguay) Matías Viña	9 November 1997 (aged 27)	2024	2028	(Italy) AS Roma	€9m	
23	CB	(Brazil) David Luiz	22 April 1987 (aged 37)	2021	2024	(England) Arsenal	Free	
26	LB	(Brazil) Alex Sandro	26 January 1991 (aged 33)	2024	2026	Free agent	Free	
33	CB	(Brazil) Cleiton	25 April 2003 (aged 21)	2021	2025	Youth system		
43	RB	(Brazil) Wesley França	6 September 2003 (aged 21)	2021	2028	Youth system		
Midfielders
5	DM	(Chile) Erick Pulgar	15 January 1994 (aged 30)	2022	2025	(Italy) Fiorentina	€3m	
8	CM	(Brazil) Gerson	20 May 1997 (aged 27)	2023	2027	(France) Olympique de Marseille	€15m	Captain
14	AM	(Uruguay) Giorgian de Arrascaeta	1 June 1994 (aged 30)	2019	2026	(Brazil) Cruzeiro	€15m	Vice Captain
18	CM	(Uruguay) Nicolás de la Cruz	1 June 1997 (aged 27)	2024	2028	(Argentina) River Plate	€14.5m	
20	AM	(Brazil) Matheus Gonçalves	18 August 2005 (aged 19)	2022	2027	Youth system		
29	DM	(Brazil) Allan	3 March 1997 (aged 27)	2023	2027	(Brazil) Atlético Mineiro	€8.2m	
37	CM	(Argentina) Carlos Alcaraz	30 November 2002 (aged 22)	2024	2029	(England) Southampton	€18m	
52	DM	(Brazil) Evertton Araújo	28 February 2003 (aged 21)	2024	2028	Youth system		
Forwards
7	RW	(Brazil) Luiz Araújo	2 June 1996 (aged 28)	2023	2027	(United States) Atlanta United	€9m	
9	CF	(Brazil) Pedro	20 June 1997 (aged 27)	2020	2027	(Italy) Fiorentina	€14m	
11	LW	(Brazil) Everton	22 March 1996 (aged 28)	2022	2026	(Portugal) Benfica	€13.5m	
19	RW	(Brazil) Lorran	4 June 2006 (aged 18)	2023	2029	Youth system		
22	CF	(Brazil) Carlinhos	12 February 1997 (aged 27)	2024	2027	(Brazil) Nova Iguaçu	€0.6m	
27	LW	(Brazil) Bruno Henrique	30 December 1990 (aged 34)	2019	2026	(Brazil) Santos	€5.4m	
30	LW	(Brazil) Michael	12 March 1996 (aged 28)	2024	2028	(Saudi Arabia) Al Hilal	Free	
45	RW	(Ecuador) Gonzalo Plata	1 November 2000 (aged 24)	2024	2029	(Qatar) Al Sadd	€3.8m	
99	CF	(Brazil) Gabriel Barbosa	30 August 1996 (aged 28)	2019	2024	(Italy) Inter Milan	€17m	

- - Currently injured

=== New contracts ===
No.	Pos.	Player	Date	Until	Source
23	DF	(Brazil) David Luiz	1 January 2024	31 December 2024	
27	FW	(Brazil) Bruno Henrique	1 January 2024	31 December 2026	
29	MF	(Brazil) Victor Hugo	16 January 2024	31 December 2028	
15	DF	(Brazil) Fabrício Bruno	19 February 2024	31 December 2028	
26	FW	(Brazil) Werton	21 May 2024	31 December 2026	
48	MF	(Brazil) Igor Jesus	21 May 2024	31 December 2027	
43	DF	(Brazil) Wesley França	11 July 2024	31 December 2028	
19	FW	(Brazil) Lorran	14 August 2024	31 December 2029	
49	GK	(Brazil) Dyogo Alves	23 August 2024	31 December 2026	
52	MF	(Brazil) Evertton Araújo	6 December 2024	31 December 2028	

== Transfers and loans ==
=== Transfers in ===
Pos.	Player	Transferred from	Fee	Date	Team	Source
MF	(Brazil) Evertton Araújo	(Brazil) Volta Redonda	Undisclosed	1 January 2024	First Team	
MF	(Uruguay) Nicolás de la Cruz	(Argentina) River Plate	R$78.1m / €14.5m	1 January 2024	First Team	
DF	(Uruguay) Matías Viña	(Italy) AS Roma	R$48.3m / €9.0m	25 January 2024	First Team	
DF	(Brazil) Léo Ortiz	(Brazil) Red Bull Bragantino	R$37.6m / €7.0m	5 March 2024	First Team	
FW	(Brazil) Carlinhos	(Brazil) Nova Iguaçu	R$3.2m / €0.6m	8 April 2024	First Team	
FW	(Brazil) Petterson	(Brazil) Athletico Paranaense	Loan return	19 April 2024	First Team	
FW	(Nigeria) Shola Ogundana	(Nigeria) Remo Stars F.C.	R$2.4m / €0.4m	17 July 2024	Youth team	
FW	(Brazil) Michael	(Saudi Arabia) Al Hilal	Free	22 August 2024	First Team	
MF	(Paraguay) Jorge Mora	(Paraguay) Sol de América	R$1.7m / €0.3m	22 August 2024	Youth team	
DF	(Brazil) Alex Sandro	Free agent	Free	26 August 2024	First Team	
MF	(Argentina) Carlos Alcaraz	(England) Southampton	R$110.8m / €18m	28 August 2024	First Team	
FW	(Ecuador) Gonzalo Plata	(Qatar) Al Sadd	R$24.0m / €3.8m	30 August 2024	First Team	
Total			R$306.7m / €53.6m			

=== Loan in ===
Pos.	Player	Loaned from	Fee	Start	End	Team	Source
MF	(Brazil) Thiago Medeiros	(Brazil) Atlético Goianiense	Free	23 February 2024	31 December 2024	Youth team	
FW	(Nigeria) Hassan Haruna	(Brazil) XV de Piracicaba	Free	7 March 2024	31 January 2025	Youth team	
MF	(Chile) Joan Orellana	(Chile) Universidad Católica	Free	28 January 2024	31 December 2024	Youth team	

=== Transfers out ===
Pos.	Player	Transferred to	Fee	Date	Team	Source
DF	(Brazil) Filipe Luís	Retired	End of contract	1 January 2024	First Team	
DF	(Brazil) Rodrigo Caio	Free agent	End of contract	1 January 2024	First Team	
MF	(Brazil) Éverton Ribeiro	(Brazil) Bahia	End of contract	1 January 2024	First Team	
GK	(Brazil) Santos	(Brazil) Fortaleza	R$4.8m / €0.9m	13 January 2024	First Team	
DF	(Paraguay) Santiago Ocampos	(Brazil) Operário Ferroviário	Free	9 April 2024	First Team	
MF	(Brazil) Daniel Cabral	(Portugal) Estrela da Amadora	Free	1 June 2024	First Team	
FW	(Brazil) André Luiz	(Portugal) Estrela da Amadora	R$3.2m / €0.6m	1 July 2024	First Team	
MF	(Brazil) Thiago Maia	(Brazil) Internacional	R$6.9m / €1.2m	3 July 2024	First Team	
FW	(Brazil) Werton	(Portugal) Leixões	R$5.9m / €1.0m	12 July 2024	First Team	
MF	(Brazil) Diego Santos	(Portugal) Paços de Ferreira	Undisclosed	12 July 2024	Youth team	
FW	(Brazil) Weliton	(Brazil) Juventude	Loan return	13 July 2024	Youth team	
DF	(Brazil) Gabriel Noga	(Portugal) Leixões	R$0.6m / €0.1m	21 July 2024	First Team	
FW	(Brazil) Pedro Estevam	(Brazil) Ferroviária	Loan return	22 July 2024	Youth team	
DF	(Brazil) Felipe Braian	Free agent	Released	22 July 2024	Youth team	
FW	(Brazil) Guilherme Teixeira	(Brazil) Juventude	Loan return	22 July 2024	Youth team	
FW	(Nigeria) Hassan Haruna	(United Arab Emirates) Al Bataeh	R$14.1m / €2.3m	22 July 2024	Youth team	
MF	(Brazil) João Marcos	(United Arab Emirates) Al Ain	Undisclosed	22 July 2024	Youth team	
MF	(Brazil) Khauan Schlickmann	(United Arab Emirates) Al Ain	Undisclosed	23 July 2024	Youth team	
MF	(Brazil) Igor Jesus	(Portugal) Estrela da Amadora	R$12.5m / €2.0m	30 August 2024	First Team	
Total			R$48.0m / €7.1m			

=== Loan out ===
Pos.	Player	Loaned to	Fee	Start	End	Team	Source
DF	(Brazil) Gabriel Noga	(Portugal) Leixões	Free	30 January 2024	31 July 2024	First team	
FW	(Brazil) Petterson	(Brazil) Athletico Paranaense	Free	31 January 2024	30 June 2024	First team	
FW	(Brazil) Thiago Fernandes	(Brazil) Treze	Free	17 February 2024	31 December 2024	First team	
MF	(Brazil) Thiago Maia	(Brazil) Internacional	Free	7 March 2024	31 December 2024	First team	
FW	(Brazil) Petterson	(Portugal) Estrela da Amadora	Free	1 July 2024	30 June 2025	First team	
GK	(Brazil) Hugo Souza	(Brazil) Corinthians	R$1.2m / €0.2m	2 July 2024	31 December 2024	First team	
MF	(Brazil) Victor Hugo	(Turkey) Göztepe	Free	28 August 2024	30 June 2024	First team	
Total			R$1.2m / €0.2m				

== Statistics ==
=== Manager records ===
Name	Nat	Record							
Name	Nat	G	W	D	L	GF	GA	GD	Win %
Tite	Brazil	55	33	10	12	88	38	+50	60.00
Mário Jorge (interim) (Note: Mário Jorge was in charge of a under-20 side during two 2024 Campeonato Carioca matches, as the main squad was traveling to play international friendly matches.)	Brazil	2	0	2	0	1	1	+0	0.00
Matheus Bachi (interim) (Note: Matheus Bachi was in charge during the 2024 Campeonato Brasileiro Série A match against Red Bull Bragantino as Tite was recovering from health problems.)	Brazil	1	1	0	0	2	1	+1	100.00
Filipe Luís	Brazil	15	9	5	1	23	11	+12	60.00
Total		73	43	17	13	114	51	+63	58.90

=== Appearances ===
Source: Soccerway, FBRef

Players in italics have left the club before the end of the season.
^{†} Denotes two way player, youth and professional team.

No.	Pos.	Name	Série A		Copa do Brasil		Libertadores		Carioca		Total		
No.	Pos.	Name	Starts	Subs	Starts	Subs	Starts	Subs	Starts	Subs	Starts	Subs	Apps
Goalkeepers
1	GK	(Argentina) Agustín Rossi	35	0	4	0	10	0	12	0	61	0	61
24	GK	(Brazil) Lucas Furtado^{†}	0	0	—	—	0	0	0	0	0	0	0
25	GK	(Brazil) Matheus Cunha	3	0	6	0	0	0	3	0	12	0	12
49	GK	(Brazil) Dyogo Alves^{†}	0	0	0	0	0	0	0	0	0	0	0
66	GK	(Brazil) Caio Barone^{†}	0	0	—	—	—	—	0	0	0	0	0
68	GK	(Brazil) João Vitor Cangane^{†}	—	—	—	—	—	—	0	0	0	0	0
Defenders
2	RB	(Uruguay) Guillermo Varela	12	6	5	2	8	1	11	1	36	10	46
3	CB	(Brazil) Léo Ortiz	21	4	7	2	5	1	0	0	32	8	40
4	CB	(Brazil) Léo Pereira	21	7	9	0	8	0	11	1	49	8	57
6	LB	(Brazil) Ayrton Lucas	29	3	5	3	5	4	11	0	50	10	60
15	CB	(Brazil) Fabrício Bruno	26	2	6	2	7	1	11	0	50	5	55
17	LB	(Uruguay) Matías Viña	4	5	1	2	3	2	1	4	9	13	22
23	CB	(Brazil) David Luiz	21	2	0	3	3	3	4	0	28	8	36
26	LB	(Brazil) Alex Sandro	5	3	4	0	2	0	–	–	11	3	14
33	CB	(Brazil) Cleiton	1	3	0	0	0	0	0	1	1	4	5
39	LB	(Brazil) Zé Welinton^{†}	0	0	—	—	—	—	2	0	2	0	2
41	CB	(Brazil) João Pedro Da Mata^{†}	0	0	—	—	—	—	–	–	0	0	0
43	RB	(Brazil) Wesley França	24	6	5	4	1	3	3	3	33	16	49
44	CB	(Brazil) João Victor Carbone^{†}	0	0	0	0	0	0	0	0	0	0	0
51	RB	(Brazil) Daniel Sales^{†}	0	1	—	—	—	—	—	—	0	1	1
53	RB	(Brazil) Lucyan^{†}	—	—	—	—	0	0	0	1	0	1	1
57	CB	(Brazil) Iago Teodoro^{†}	0	0	—	—	0	0	0	1	0	1	1
61	CB	(Brazil) João Victor^{†}	0	1	—	—	—	—	–	–	0	1	1
67	CB	(Brazil) Victor Thiago^{†}	—	—	—	—	—	—	0	0	0	0	0
70	LB	(Brazil) Ainoã^{†}	0	0	—	—	—	—	0	0	0	0	0
Midfielders
5	DM	(Chile) Erick Pulgar	21	2	6	1	5	1	10	1	42	5	47
8	CM	(Brazil) Gerson	27	5	10	0	8	0	5	1	50	6	56
14	AM	(Uruguay) Giorgian de Arrascaeta	11	4	8	0	7	0	11	1	37	5	42
18	CM	(Uruguay) Nicolás de la Cruz	11	4	6	0	9	0	11	0	37	4	41
20	AM	(Brazil) Matheus Gonçalves^{†}	8	6	0	3	0	2	0	3	8	14	22
29	DM	(Brazil) Allan	16	8	3	2	3	2	1	5	23	17	40
35	CM	(Brazil) Rayan Lucas^{†}	0	0	0	0	0	0	1	2	1	2	3
37	CM	(Argentina) Carlos Alcaraz	8	6	0	3	0	1	—	—	8	10	18
42	DM	(Brazil) Fabiano^{†}	0	0	—	—	0	0	–	–	0	0	0
50	CM	(Brazil) João Alves^{†}	0	0	—	—	–	–	–	–	0	0	0
52	CM	(Brazil) Evertton Araújo	8	8	3	1	0	2	2	1	13	12	25
55	CM	(Brazil) Caio Garcia^{†}	0	0	—	—	—	—	0	0	0	0	0
60	CM	(Brazil) Luís Aucélio^{†}	0	0	—	—	—	—	–	–	0	0	0
62	DM	(Brazil) Daniel Rogério^{†}	—	—	—	—	—	—	0	0	0	0	0
63	CM	(Brazil) Jean Carlos^{†}	—	—	—	—	—	—	0	0	0	0	0
Forwards
7	RW	(Brazil) Luiz Araújo	15	10	3	3	4	4	10	3	32	20	52
9	CF	(Brazil) Pedro	19	2	4	0	6	0	11	1	40	3	43
11	LW	(Brazil) Everton	10	0	2	1	5	0	10	2	27	3	30
19	RW	(Brazil) Lorran^{†}	8	11	2	0	0	4	3	0	12	16	28
22	CF	(Brazil) Carlinhos	5	8	—	—	1	2	—	—	6	10	16
27	LW	(Brazil) Bruno Henrique	24	5	6	0	5	3	3	10	38	17	55
30	LW	(Brazil) Michael	6	6	1	2	—	—	–	–	8	8	16
40	CF	(Brazil) Felipe Teresa^{†}	0	1	—	—	–	–	–	–	0	1	1
45	RW	(Ecuador) Gonzalo Plata	8	3	1	3	2	0	–	–	11	6	17
47	CF	(Brazil) Guilherme Gomes^{†}	0	1	—	—	—	—	0	0	0	1	1
53	CF	(Brazil) Felipe Lima^{†}	—	—	—	—	—	—	0	0	0	0	0
54	LW	(Nigeria) Shola Ogundana^{†}	0	1	0	0	—	—	—	—	0	1	1
59	CF	(Brazil) Pedro Leão^{†}	0	0	—	—	—	—	0	0	0	0	0
64	CF	(Brazil) Wallace Yan^{†}	0	1	—	—	0	0	0	1	0	2	2
99	CF	(Brazil) Gabriel Barbosa	7	12	4	3	0	4	2	6	13	25	38
Player(s) transferred out during the season
8	DM	(Brazil) Thiago Maia	—	—	—	—	—	—	1	0	1	0	1
26	LW	(Brazil) Werton^{†}	0	2	—	—	0	0	2	0	2	2	4
29	CM	(Brazil) Victor Hugo	1	9	0	1	1	1	1	8	3	19	22
30	CB	(Brazil) Pablo	—	—	—	—	—	—	1	0	1	0	1
32	LW	(Brazil) Thiago Fernandes	—	—	—	—	—	—	1	0	1	0	1
34	RB	(Brazil) Matheuzinho	—	—	—	—	—	—	1	0	1	0	1
37	LW	(Brazil) Petterson	—	—	—	—	—	—	1	0	1	0	1
38	CF	(Brazil) André Luiz	—	—	—	—	—	—	—	—	0	0	0
41	CB	(Brazil) Gabriel Noga	—	—	—	—	—	—	1	0	1	0	1
42	RB	(Paraguay) Santiago Ocampos	—	—	—	—	—	—	1	1	1	1	2
46	CM	(Brazil) João Marcos^{†}	—	—	—	—	—	—	0	0	0	0	0
47	CF	(Brazil) Pedro Estevam^{†}	—	—	—	—	—	—	0	1	0	1	1
48	DM	(Brazil) Igor Jesus	2	1	0	3	2	1	2	6	6	11	17
50	CB	(Brazil) Diego Santos^{†}	—	—	—	—	—	—	2	0	2	0	2
65	CF	(Brazil) Weliton^{†}	0	0	—	—	0	0	0	1	0	1	1

=== Goalscorers ===
Rank	Pos.	No.	Player	Série A	Copa do Brasil	Libertadores	Carioca	Total
1	FW	9	(Brazil) Pedro	11	3	5	11	30
2	MF	14	(Uruguay) Giorgian de Arrascaeta	5	2	0	3	10
3	FW	27	(Brazil) Bruno Henrique	6	1	0	2	9
4	FW	99	(Brazil) Gabriel Barbosa	4	2	0	2	8
5	FW	7	(Brazil) Luiz Araújo	4	1	1	1	7
6	DF	6	(Brazil) Ayrton Lucas	3	0	1	1	5
6	FW	11	(Brazil) Everton	1	0	1	3	5
8	DF	4	(Brazil) Léo Pereira	0	0	1	3	4
8	MF	8	(Brazil) Gerson	3	0	1	0	4
8	FW	30	(Brazil) Michael	4	0	0	0	4
11	DF	23	(Brazil) David Luiz	3	0	0	0	3
12	DF	2	(Uruguay) Guillermo Varela	1	0	0	1	2
12	DF	3	(Brazil) Léo Ortiz	1	0	1	0	2
12	MF	18	(Uruguay) Nicolás de la Cruz	2	0	0	0	2
12	FW	20	(Brazil) Matheus Gonçalves	2	0	0	0	2
12	FW	22	(Brazil) Carlinhos	2	0	0	0	2
12	MF	37	(Argentina) Carlos Alcaraz	2	0	0	0	2
12	FW	45	(Ecuador) Gonzalo Plata	1	1	0	0	2
19	DF	15	(Brazil) Fabrício Bruno	1	0	0	0	1
19	DF	17	(Uruguay) Matías Viña	0	0	1	0	1
19	FW	19	(Brazil) Lorran	1	0	0	0	1
19	DF	26	(Brazil) Alex Sandro	0	1	0	0	1
19	FW	32	(Brazil) Thiago Fernandes	0	0	0	1	1
19	FW	40	(Brazil) Felipe Teresa	1	0	0	0	1
19	FW	47	(Brazil) Guilherme	1	0	0	0	1
19	MF	52	(Brazil) Evertton Araújo	1	0	0	0	1
Own Goal(s)				1	0	1	1	3
Total				61	11	13	29	114

=== Penalty kicks ===
Includes only penalty kicks taken during matches.

Rank	Pos.	No.	Player	Série A	Copa do Brasil	Libertadores	Carioca	Total
1	FW	9	(Brazil) Pedro	4 / 5	0 / 0	1 / 1	2 / 3	7 / 9
2	MF	37	(Argentina) Carlos Alcaraz	2 / 2	0 / 0	0 / 0	0 / 0	2 / 2
2	FW	99	(Brazil) Gabriel Barbosa	2 / 2	0 / 0	0 / 0	0 / 1	2 / 3
4	FW	27	(Brazil) Bruno Henrique	1 / 1	0 / 0	0 / 0	0 / 0	1 / 1
5	DF	23	(Brazil) David Luiz	0 / 1	0 / 0	0 / 0	0 / 0	0 / 1
Total				9 / 11	0 / 0	1 / 1	2 / 4	12 / 16

=== Assists ===
Rank	Pos.	No.	Player	Série A	Copa do Brasil	Libertadores	Carioca	Total
1	MF	14	(Uruguay) Giorgian de Arrascaeta	5	0	0	5	10
2	FW	7	(Brazil) Luiz Araújo	5	1	1	2	9
2	MF	8	(Brazil) Gerson	6	0	2	1	9
4	FW	9	(Brazil) Pedro	5	0	2	1	8
5	MF	18	(Uruguay) Nicolás de la Cruz	3	2	0	1	6
5	DF	6	(Brazil) Ayrton Lucas	3	0	0	3	6
7	FW	11	(Brazil) Everton	2	0	1	2	5
7	FW	27	(Brazil) Bruno Henrique	1	3	0	1	5
9	MF	5	(Chile) Erick Pulgar	3	0	0	1	4
10	DF	3	(Brazil) Léo Ortiz	2	0	0	0	3
10	FW	19	(Brazil) Lorran	1	0	1	1	3
12	DF	17	(Uruguay) Matías Viña	0	1	1	0	2
12	MF	37	(Argentina) Carlos Alcaraz	1	1	0	0	2
12	DF	43	(Brazil) Wesley França	2	0	0	0	2
12	MF	48	(Brazil) Igor Jesus	0	1	0	1	2
16	DF	26	(Brazil) Alex Sandro	1	0	0	0	1
16	FW	30	(Brazil) Michael	1	0	0	0	1
16	FW	45	(Ecuador) Gonzalo Plata	1	0	0	0	1
16	FW	99	(Brazil) Gabriel Barbosa	1	0	0	0	1
Total				42	10	8	19	79

=== Clean sheets ===
Rank	No.	Player	Série A	Copa do Brasil	Libertadores	Carioca	Total
1	1	(Argentina) Agustín Rossi	8 / 35	3 / 4	5 / 10	12 / 12	28 / 61
2	25	(Brazil) Matheus Cunha	2 / 3	5 / 6	—	2 / 3	9 / 12
Total			10 / 38	8 / 10	5 / 10	14 / 15	37 / 73

=== Penalty kick saves ===
Includes only penalty kicks saves during matches.

Rank	No.	Player	Série A	Copa do Brasil	Libertadores	Carioca	Total
1	1	(Argentina) Agustín Rossi	3 / 5	0 / 0	0 / 0	0 / 0	3 / 5
2	25	(Brazil) Matheus Cunha	0 / 0	0 / 0	—	0 / 0	0 / 0
Total			3 / 5	0 / 0	0 / 0	0 / 0	3 / 5

=== Season records ===
==== Individual ====
- Most matches played in the season in all competitions: 61 – Agustín Rossi
- Most League matches played in the season: 35 – Agustín Rossi
- Most matches played as starter in the season in all competitions: 61 – Agustín Rossi
- Most League matches played as starter in the season: '35 – Agustín Rossi
- Most matches played as substitute in the season in all competitions: 25 – Gabriel Barbosa
- Most League matches played as substitute in the season: 12 – Gabriel Barbosa and Lorran
- Most goals in the season in all competitions: 30 – Pedro
- Most League goals in the season: 11 – Pedro
- Most clean sheets in the season in all competitions: 28 – Agustín Rossi
- Most League clean sheets in the season: 8 – Agustín Rossi
- Most goals scored in a match: 3 – Pedro
- Goals in consecutive matches in all competitions: 6
  - Pedro, 10 February 2024 to 9 March 2024
- Goals in consecutive League matches: 3
  - Pedro, 23 June 2024 to 30 June 2024
- Fastest goal: 56 seconds – Gerson vs Bolívar, Copa Libertadores, 15 May 2024
- Hat-tricks:
  - Pedro vs Bangu, Campeonato Carioca, 15 February 2024
- Youngest goalscorer: Lorran – 17 years, 312 days (vs Corinthians, Série A, 11 May 2024)
- Oldest goalscorer: David Luiz – 37 years, 198 days (vs Cruzeiro, Série A, 6 November 2024)
- Most assists in the season in all competitions: 10 – Giorgian de Arrascaeta
- Most League assists in the season: 6 – Gerson
- Most assists in a match: 2
  - Giorgian de Arrascaeta vs Vasco da Gama, Série A, 2 June 2024
  - Everton vs Vasco da Gama, Série A, 2 June 2024
  - Pedro vs Grêmio, Série A, 13 June 2024
  - Gerson vs Juventude, Série A, 26 October 2024
  - Erick Pulgar vs Vitória, Série A, 8 December 2024
- Assists in consecutive matches in all competitions: 3
  - Luiz Araújo, 26 June 2024 to 3 July 2024
- Assists in consecutive League matches: 3
  - Luiz Araújo, 26 June 2024 to 3 July 2024

==== Team ====
- Biggest home win in all competitions:
  - 4–0 vs Audax Rio, Campeonato Carioca, 17 January 2024
  - 4–0 vs Boavista, Campeonato Carioca, 20 February 2024
  - 4–0 vs Bolívar, Copa Libertadores, 15 May 2024
- Biggest League home win:
  - 2–0 vs Corinthians, Série A, 11 May 2024
  - 2–0 vs Atlético Goianiense, Série A, 28 July 2024
  - 4–2 vs Juventude, Série A, 26 October 2024
- Biggest away win in all competitions:
  - 6–1 vs Vasco da Gama, Série A, 2 June 2024
- Biggest League away win:
  - 6–1 vs Vasco da Gama, Série A, 2 June 2024
- Biggest home loss in all competitions:
  - 0–2 vs Botafogo, Série A, 28 April 2024
  - 0–2 vs Fluminense, Série A, 17 October 2024
- Biggest League home loss:
  - 0–2 vs Botafogo, Série A, 28 April 2024
- Biggest away loss in all competitions:
  - 1–4 vs Botafogo, Série A, 18 August 2024
- Biggest League away loss:
  - 1–4 vs Botafogo, Série A, 18 August 2024
- Highest scoring match in all competitions:
  - 6–1 vs Vasco da Gama, Série A, 2 June 2024
- Highest scoring League match:
  - 6–1 vs Vasco da Gama, Série A, 2 June 2024
- Longest winning run in all competitions: 7 consecutive match(es)
  - 7 February 2024 to 9 March 2024
- Longest League winning run: 3 consecutive match(es)
  - 11 May 2024 to 13 June 2024
  - 20 July 2024 to 28 July 2024
- Longest unbeaten run in all competitions: 20 consecutive match(es)
  - 17 January 2024 to 21 April 2024
- Longest League unbeaten run: 9 consecutive match(es)
  - 28 October 2024 to 8 December 2024
- Longest losing run in all competitions: 2 consecutive match(es)
  - 24 April 2024 to 28 April 2024
  - 3 August 2024 to 7 August 2024
  - 18 August 2024 to 22 August 2024
  - 19 September 2024 to 22 September 2024
- Longest League losing run: 1 consecutive match(es)
  - 28 April 2024
  - 26 June 2024
  - 11 July 2024
  - 3 August 2024
  - 18 August 2024
  - 1 September 2024
  - 22 September 2024
  - 17 October 2024
- Longest without win run in all competitions: 4 consecutive match(es)
  - 15 September 2024 to 26 September 2024
- Longest without League win run: 3 consecutive match(es)
  - 21 April 2024 to 4 May 2024
  - 3 August 2024 to 18 August 2024
  - 1 September 2024 to 22 September 2024
- Longest scoring run in all competitions: 18 consecutive match(es)
  - 11 May 2024 to 31 July 2024
- Longest League scoring run: 15 consecutive match(es)
  - 11 May 2024 to 28 July 2024
- Longest without scoring run in all competitions: 2 consecutive match(es)
  - 3 August 2024 to 7 August 2024
  - 17 October 2024 to 20 October 2024
- Longest League without scoring run: 2 consecutive match(es)
  - 21 April 2024 to 28 April 2024
- Longest conceding goals run in all competitions: 7 consecutive match(es)
  - 26 June 2024 to 24 July 2024
- Longest League conceding goals run: 7 consecutive match(es)
  - 26 June 2024 to 24 July 2024
  - 3 August 2024 to 22 September 2024
- Longest without conceding goals run in all competitions: 12 consecutive match(es)
  - 27 January 2024 to 30 March 2024
- Longest League without conceding goals run: 2 consecutive match(es)
  - 29 September 2024 to 5 October 2024
  - 6 November 2024 to 13 November 2024

=== National Team statistics ===
As of 19 November 2024

Appearances and goals while playing for Flamengo, includes only FIFA matches.

No.	Pos.	Name	Nat. Team	Friendlies		Copa América		FWC Qualifiers		Total	
No.	Pos.	Name	Nat. Team	Apps	Goals	Apps	Goals	Apps	Goals	Apps	Goals
2	DF	Guillermo Varela	Uruguay	0	0	2	0	4	0	6	0
3	DF	Léo Ortiz	Brazil	—		—		0	0	0	0
5	MF	Erick Pulgar	Chile	1	0	3	0	2	0	6	0
6	DF	Ayrton Lucas	Brazil	0	0	—		—		0	0
8	MF	Gerson	Brazil	—		—		6	1	6	1
9	FW	Pedro	Brazil	—		—		—		0	0
14	MF	Giorgian de Arrascaeta	Uruguay	1	0	5	0	2	0	8	0
15	DF	Fabrício Bruno	Brazil	2	0	—		0	0	2	0
17	DF	Matías Viña	Uruguay	1	0	5	1	—		6	1
18	MF	Nicolás de la Cruz	Uruguay	1	0	5	0	1	0	7	0
45	FW	Gonzalo Plata	Ecuador	—		—		4	2	4	2

=== Attendance ===
Includes all competition home matches in the 2024 season. Attendances recorded represent actual gate attendance, not paid attendance.

Campeonato Carioca
Stadium	Matches	Average	Highest attendance	Lowest attendance
Maracanã	7	52,246	65,757	35,713
Arena da Amazônia	1	44,068	44,068	44,068
Total	8	51,224	409,793	
Copa do Brasil
Stadium	Matches	Average	Highest attendance	Lowest attendance
Maracanã	5	56,779	67,459	39,015
Total	5	56,779	283,894	
Libertadores
Stadium	Matches	Average	Highest attendance	Lowest attendance
Maracanã	5	63,162	65,381	58,597
Total	5	62,854	315,811	
Série A
Stadium	Matches	Average	Highest attendance	Lowest attendance
Maracanã	18	54,131	67,113	28,708
Arena BRB Mané Garrincha	1	60,127	60,127	60,127
Total	19	54,447	1,034,489	
Season total	37	55,243	2,043,987	

== Individual awards ==
Name	Position	Nat.	Award
Agustín Rossi	GK	(Argentina)	Campeonato Carioca Team of the Season; Copa do Brasil Team of the Season
Guillermo Varela	DF	(Uruguay)	Campeonato Carioca Team of the Season
Wesley França	DF	(Brazil)	Copa do Brasil Team of the Season; Campeonato Brasileiro Série A Team of the Season
Fabrício Bruno	DF	(Brazil)	Campeonato Carioca Team of the Season
Léo Pereira	DF	(Brazil)	Campeonato Carioca Team of the Season
Léo Ortiz	DF	(Brazil)	Copa do Brasil Team of the Season
Erick Pulgar	MF	(Chile)	Campeonato Carioca Team of the Season; Copa do Brasil Team of the Season
Nicolás de la Cruz	MF	(Uruguay)	Campeonato Carioca Team of the Season; Campeonato Brasileiro Série A Player of the Month: May
Giorgian de Arrascaeta	MF	(Uruguay)	Campeonato Carioca Team of the Season; Campeonato Carioca Best Player; Copa do Brasil Team of the Season
Gerson	MF	(Brazil)	Copa do Brasil Team of the Season; Campeonato Brasileiro Série A Team of the Season; Campeonato Brasileiro Série A Player of the Month: October
Pedro	FW	(Brazil)	Campeonato Carioca Team of the Season; Campeonato Carioca Top Goal Scorer; Campeonato Brasileiro Série A Player of the Month: June; Campeonato Brasileiro Série A Player of the Month: July
Gabriel Barbosa	FW	(Brazil)	Copa do Brasil Team of the Season
Filipe Luís	HC	(Brazil)	Copa do Brasil Head Coach of the Season
