= Adedoyin Sanni =

Nigerian association football player

Personal information
- Full name: Adedoyin Olaolu Sanni
- Date of birth: 6 January 1995 (age 31)
- Place of birth: Ibadan, Nigeria
- Position: Centre back

Youth career
- Brescia

Senior career*
Years	Team	Apps	(Gls)
2014–2016	Pescara	0	(0)
2015–2016	→ L'Aquila (loan)	13	(0)
2016–2017	Calvina		
2017–2021	Ciliverghe	61	(0)
- * Club domestic league appearances and goals as of 15 October 2026

Adedoyin Olaolu Sanni (born 6 January 1995) is a Nigerian footballer who plays as a centre back.

== Biography ==
Born in Ibadan, Nigeria, Sanni was a youth product of Italian club Brescia. He was a player of the reserve team from 2012 to 2014. In June 2014, Sanni and Bosonin were sold to fellow Serie B club Pescara for €800,000 and €700,000 respectively. However, Brescia also signed Massimo Camilli and Alessio Gabrielli also for €800,000 and €700,000 respectively, making the deal a pure player swap.

Sanni spent 2014–15 season as an overage player of Pescara's reserve.

On 9 July 2015 L'Aquila signed Sanni, Mancini, Bensaja and Savelloni in temporary deals from Pescara .

Sanni scored in his professional debut in the first round of 2015–16 Coppa Italia.
