= Evertton Araújo =

Brazilian association football player (born 2003)

Personal information
- Full name: Evertton Araújo
- Birth name: Evertton Gustavo Fernandes Araújo
- Date of birth: 28 February 2003 (age 23)
- Place of birth: Volta Redonda, Brazil
- Height: 1.84 m (6 ft 0 in)
- Position: Midfielder

Team information
- Current team: Flamengo
- Number: 52

Youth career
- Volta Redonda
- 2018: Cruzeiro
- 2019: Botafogo
- 2019–2023: Volta Redonda
- 2022–2023: → Flamengo (loan)

Senior career*
Years	Team	Apps	(Gls)
2021–2023	Volta Redonda	1	(0)
2023	→ Flamengo (loan)	3	(0)
2024–	Flamengo	61	(2)
- * Club domestic league appearances and goals as of 26 May 2026

Evertton Araújo (born 28 February 2003) is a Brazilian footballer who plays as a midfielder for Campeonato Brasileiro Série A club Flamengo.

== Club career ==
=== Early career ===
A youth player at Volta Redonda FC, Evertton also had time in the youth system at Cruzeiro and, Botafogo before rejoining Volta Redonda. He played for the club in the 2022 Copa São Paulo de Futebol Júnior.

=== Flamengo ===
Evertton joined Flamengo initially on loan. The loan was extended in May 2022 until December 2023, with an option to buy. He made his debut for the senior Flamengo's professional team in the 2023 Campeonato Carioca in a 1-0 win against Audax on 13 January 2023. In December 2023, he joined Flamengo on a permanent basis.

In 2024, Evertton featured in three matches of the 2024 Campeonato Carioca. The club rejected América Mineiro transfer interest in the player in March 2024. He appeared as a substitute in the Copa Libertadores on 2 April 2024 away against Colombian side Millionarios in a 1-1 draw.

== Career statistics ==
=== Club ===
As of 27 October 2024.

Club	Season	League			State League		Cup		Continental		Other		Total	
Club	Season	Division	Apps	Goals	Apps	Goals	Apps	Goals	Apps	Goals	Apps	Goals	Apps	Goals
Volta Redonda	2021	Série C	0	0	—		—		—		—		0	0
Volta Redonda	2022	Série C	—		1	0	—		—		—		1	0
Volta Redonda	Total		0	0	1	0	0	0	0	0	0	0	1	0
Flamengo (loan)	2023	Série A	0	0	3	0	0	0	—		—		3	0
Flamengo	2024	Série A	9	1	3	0	2	0	2 (Note: Appearance(s) in Copa Libertadores.)	0	—		16	1
Flamengo	Total		9	1	3	0	2	0	2	0	0	0	16	1
Career total			9	1	7	0	2	0	2	0	0	0	20	1

== Honours ==
=== Club ===
Flamengo

- FIFA Challenger Cup: 2025
- FIFA Derby of the Americas: 2025
- Copa Libertadores: 2025
- Campeonato Brasileiro Série A: 2025
- Copa do Brasil: 2024
- Supercopa do Brasil: 2025
- Campeonato Carioca: 2024, 2025

== Style of play ==
Originally a midfielder, Evertton has also featured as a right-back under Tite at Flamengo.
