= Vastinho =

Brazilian footballer

Personal information
- Full name: Vasto Carmo Mancini
- Date of birth: 3 March 1934
- Place of birth: Ribeirão Preto, Brazil
- Date of death: 17 September 2018 (aged 84)
- Place of death: Ribeirão Preto, Brazil
- Position: Defender

Senior career*
Years	Team	Apps	(Gls)
1954–1955	Botafogo-SP		
1956–1961	Comercial-SP		
1961	Batatais		
- * Club domestic league appearances and goals as of 27 January 2024

Vasto Carmo Mancini (3 March 1934 – 17 September 2018), better known as Vastinho, was a Brazilian professional footballer who played as a defender.

== Career ==
A defender, Vastinho was part of what is considered the best team in the history of Comercial FC, alongside players such as Candão, Parracho and Paulo Bin. He was champion of the second professional division (currently Série A2) against EC Corinthians from Presidente Prudente.

== Personal life ==
Vastinho is the father of the footballer Vagner Mancini, and grandfather of Matheus Mancini.

== Honours ==
Comercial

- Campeonato Paulista Série A2: 1958

== Death ==
Vasinho died in his hometown of Ribeirão Preto, 17 September 2018, at the age of 84, following a urinary infection.
