= Carlinhos (footballer, born 1997) =

Brazilian footballer

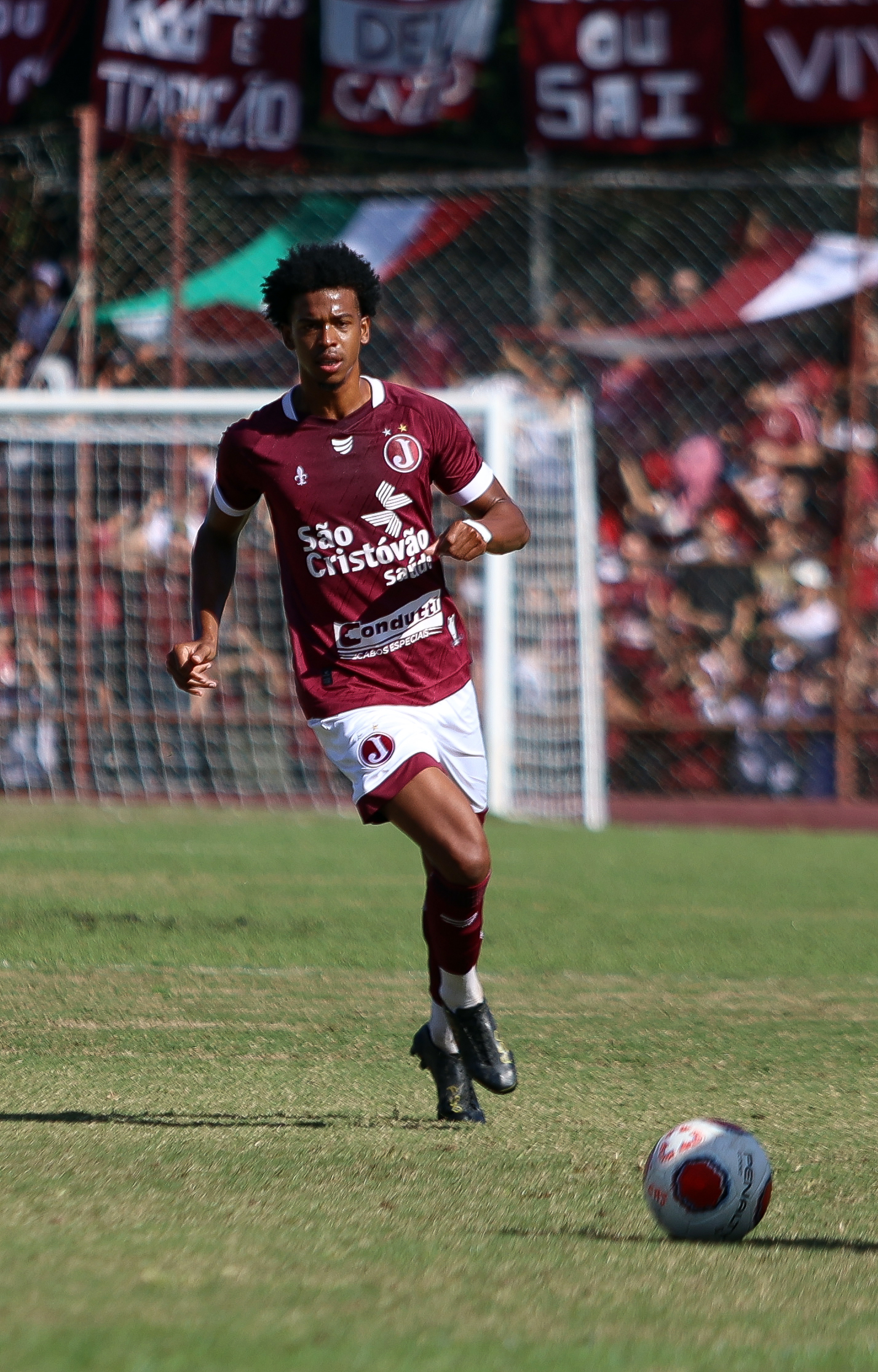
- Carlinhos playing for Juventus-SP in 2022

Personal information
- Full name: Carlos Moisés de Lima
- Date of birth: 12 February 1997 (age 29)
- Place of birth: Jaú, Brazil
- Height: 1.95 m (6 ft 5 in)
- Position: Forward

Team information
- Current team: Athletic (on loan from Flamengo)

Youth career
- 2012–2013: Noroeste
- 2014: Novorizontino
- 2014–2017: Corinthians

Senior career*
Years	Team	Apps	(Gls)
2014	Novorizontino	0	(0)
2016–2020	Corinthians	1	(0)
2018	→ Oeste (loan)	14	(2)
2019	→ Novorizontino (loan)	11	(2)
2019	→ Vila Nova (loan)	8	(0)
2020	→ Marcílio Dias (loan)	4	(0)
2020	→ Atibaia (loan)	3	(1)
2021	São Caetano	6	(0)
2021	Santo André	1	(0)
2022	Audax Rio	12	(1)
2022	Juventus-SP	0	(0)
2023	Audax Rio	6	(1)
2023	Camboriú	15	(8)
2024	Nova Iguaçu	13	(8)
2024–	Flamengo	17	(5)
2025	→ Vitória (loan)	12	(3)
2026	→ Remo (loan)	6	(1)
2026–	→ Athletic (loan)	12	(2)
- * Club domestic league appearances and goals as of 18 November 2026

Carlos Moisés de Lima (born 12 February 1997), commonly known as Carlinhos, is a Brazilian professional footballer who plays as a forward for Campeonato Brasileiro Série B club Athletic, on loan from Flamengo.

== Career ==
=== Early career ===
Born in Jaú, São Paulo, Carlinhos began his career with Noroeste before joining Novorizontino's youth sides in 2014. After one unused substitute appearance with the latter's first team, he moved to Corinthians and returned to the youth setup.

=== Corinthians ===
Carlinhos was the top scorer of the 2017 Copa São Paulo de Futebol Júnior with 11 goals, being promoted to the first team in February of that year but being subsequently sidelined due to a pubalgia. He made his first team – and Série A – debut on 26 August, replacing Moisés in a 1–0 home loss to Atlético Goianiense.

==== Loans ====
After being rarely used at Timão, Carlinhos was loaned to Oeste on 22 February 2018, alongside teammate Guilherme Romão. He scored his first senior goal on 16 June, netting the equalizer in a 2–2 Série B home draw against Criciúma.

On 22 December 2018, Carlinhos returned to Novorizontino on loan for the 2019 Campeonato Paulista. In July 2019, he moved to Vila Nova also in a temporary deal.

On 18 December 2019, Carlinhos was announced on loan at Marcílio Dias. He would spend the remaining months of the 2020 season on loan at Atibaia, and left Corinthians in the end of the year, as his contract ended.

=== Journeyman ===
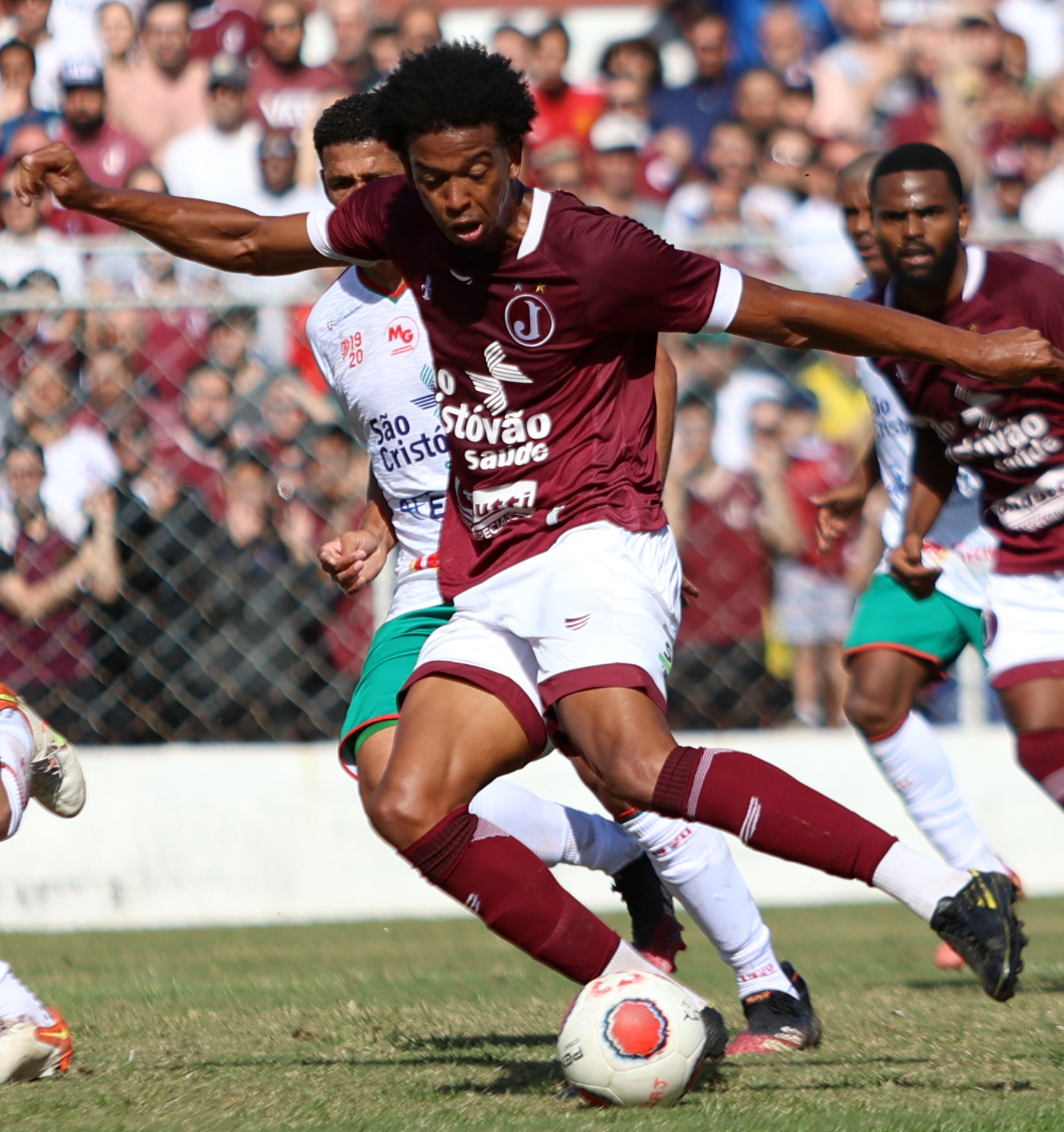
Carlinhos playing for Juventus-SP in 2022

Carlinhos was announced at São Caetano on 22 February 2021, but was rarely used and moved to Santo André on 9 September. After just one match for the latter, he signed for Audax Rio on 9 January 2022.

Carlinhos returned to his native state for the 2022 Copa Paulista with Juventus-SP, before returning to Audax for the 2023 Campeonato Carioca. On 19 April 2023, he was presented at Série D side Camboriú, being the club's top scorer with eight goals; highlights included a hat-trick in a 4–0 away routing of Aimoré on 16 July.

=== Nova Iguaçu ===
On 18 December 2023, Nova Iguaçu announced the signing of Carlinhos for the 2024 campaign. He scored five goals in his first five matches of the year, including a brace in a 2–2 away draw against Botafogo.

Carlinhos scored eight goals in the 2024 Campeonato Carioca, as the Carrossel da Baixada reached the finals for the first time ever.

=== Flamengo ===
On 8 April 2024, Carlinhos was announced at Flamengo on a contract until December 2026. He made his debut for the club six days later, replacing Léo Pereira in a 2–1 away win over Atlético Goianiense.

== Career statistics ==
As of 19 April 2024

Appearances and goals by club, season and competition
Club	Season	League			State league		Cup		Continental		Other		Total	
Club	Season	Division	Apps	Goals	Apps	Goals	Apps	Goals	Apps	Goals	Apps	Goals	Apps	Goals
Corinthians	2016	Série A	0	0	0	0	0	0	0	0	—		0	0
Corinthians	2017	Série A	1	0	0	0	0	0	0	0	—		1	0
Corinthians	2018	Série A	0	0	0	0	0	0	0	0	—		0	0
Corinthians	Total		1	0	0	0	0	0	0	0	—		1	0
Oeste (loan)	2018	Série B	14	2	—		—		—		—		14	2
Novorizontino (loan)	2019	Série D	4	1	7	1	—		—		—		11	2
Vila Nova (loan)	2019	Série B	8	0	—		—		—		—		8	0
Marcílio Dias (loan)	2020	Série D	0	0	4	0	—		—		—		4	0
Atibaia (loan)	2020	Paulista A2	—		3	1	—		—		6 (Note: Appearance(s) in Copa Paulista)	0	9	1
São Caetano	2021	Paulista	—		6	0	—		—		—		6	0
Santo André	2021	Série D	1	0	—		—		—		—		1	0
Audax Rio	2022	Carioca	—		12	1	—		—		—		12	1
Juventus-SP	2022	Paulista A2	—		—		—		—		8	0	8	0
Audax Rio	2023	Carioca	—		6	1	—		—		—		6	1
Camboriú	2023	Série D	15	8	—		—		—		—		15	8
Nova Iguaçu	2024	Série D	0	0	13	8	1	1	—		—		14	9
Flamengo	2024	Série A	1	0	—		—		0	0	—		1	0
Career total			44	11	51	12	1	1	0	0	14	0	110	24

== Honours ==
Corinthians

- Copa São Paulo de Futebol Júnior: 2017
- Campeonato Brasileiro Série A: 2017
