= Petterson Novaes =

Brazilian footballer

Petterson
Personal information
- Full name: Petterson Novaes Reis
- Date of birth: 4 January 2004 (age 22)
- Place of birth: Florianópolis, Brazil
- Height: 1.81 m (5 ft 11 in)
- Position: Forward

Team information
- Current team: Brusque
- Number: 11

Youth career
- 2017–2024: Flamengo

Senior career*
Years	Team	Apps	(Gls)
2022–2025	Flamengo	7	(0)
2024	→ Athletico Paranaense (loan)	1	(1)
2024	→ Estrela da Amadora (loan)	0	(0)
2025	→ Juventude (loan)	9	(0)
2025	→ Paysandu (loan)	10	(1)
2026–	Brusque	27	(2)
- * Club domestic league appearances and goals as of 9 November 2026

Petterson Novaes Reis (born 4 January 2004) is a Brazilian professional footballer who plays as a left wing for Brusque.

== Club career ==
=== Early career ===
Born in Florianópolis, Santa Catarina, Petterson joined Flamengo's youth categories in 2017.

=== Flamengo ===
Petterson made his professional debut for the club on 26 January 2022 against Portuguesa-RJ, coming on as a 92nd minute substitute for Thiago Fernandes as Flamengo won the match 2–1.

==== Athletico Paranaense (loan) ====
On 31 January 2024, Petterson moved to Athletico Paranaense on loan for one year, with a buyout clause.

== Career statistics ==
As of 15 February 2024

Club	Season	League			State League		Cup		Continental		Other		Total	
Club	Season	Division	Apps	Goals	Apps	Goals	Apps	Goals	Apps	Goals	Apps	Goals	Apps	Goals
Flamengo	2022	Série A	2	0	1 (Note: Appearance(s) in the Campeonato Carioca.)	0	1	0	0	0	0	0	4	0
Flamengo	2023	Série A	0	0	2	0	0	0	0	0	0	0	2	0
Flamengo	2024	Série A	0	0	2	0	0	0	—		—		2	0
Flamengo	Total		2	0	5	0	1	0	0	0	0	0	8	0
Athletico Paranaense (loan)	2024	Série A	—		1 (Note: Appearance(s) in the Campeonato Paranaense.)	1	—		—		—		1	1
Career total			2	0	6	1	1	0	0	0	0	0	9	1

== Honours ==
Flamengo

- Copa Libertadores: 2022
- Copa do Brasil: 2022
- Campeonato Carioca: 2024

Athletico Paranaense

- Campeonato Paranaense: 2024
