= 2024 Atlético Clube Goianiense season =

Atlético Clube Goianiense
2024 season
- Manager: Jair Ventura (until 21 June); Anderson Gomes (21 June–8 July); Vagner Mancini (8 July–5 August); Umberto Louzer (5 August–29 October); Anderson Gomes (from 30 October)
- Stadium: Estádio Antônio Accioly
- Série A: 19th (relegated)
- Copa do Brasil: Round of 16
- Top goalscorer: Luiz Fernando (8)
Home colours	Away colours	Third colours

The 2024 season is the 87th season in the history of Atlético Clube Goianiense and will witness its return to top flight after a one-season absence. In addition to the Série A, Atlético Goianiense will play in the Campeonato Goiano.

== Competitions ==
=== Overall record ===
Competition	First match	Last match	Starting round	Final position	Record							
Competition	First match	Last match	Starting round	Final position	Pld	W	D	L	GF	GA	GD	Win %
Série A	14 April 2024	December 2024	Matchday 1		29	5	6	18	22	47	−25	17.24
Campeonato Goiano	January 2024	March 2024	First Stage	Winner	17	14	1	2	44	11	+33	82.35
Copa do Brasil	21 February 2024		First round	Round of 16	6	4	1	1	12	6	+6	66.67
Total					52	23	8	21	78	64	+14	44.23

Last updated: 7 July 2024
Source: Soccerway

=== Série A ===
==== League table ====
Pos	Team	Pld	W	D	L	GF	GA	GD	Pts	Qualification or relegation
16	Red Bull Bragantino	38	10	14	14	44	48	−4	44	
17	Athletico Paranaense (R)	38	11	9	18	40	46	−6	42	Relegation to Campeonato Brasileiro Série B
18	Criciúma (R)	38	9	11	18	42	61	−19	38	Relegation to Campeonato Brasileiro Série B
19	Atlético Goianiense (R)	38	7	9	22	29	58	−29	30	Relegation to Campeonato Brasileiro Série B
20	Cuiabá (R)	38	6	12	20	29	49	−20	30	Relegation to Campeonato Brasileiro Série B

Source: CBF
Rules for classification: 1) points; 2) wins; 3) goal difference; 4) goals scored; 5) head-to-head results (only between two teams); 6) fewest red cards; 7) fewest yellow cards; 8) drawing of lots.
(R) Relegated

==== Results summary ====
Overall								Home						Away					
Pld	W	D	L	GF	GA	GD	Pts	W	D	L	GF	GA	GD	W	D	L	GF	GA	GD
9	2	2	5	8	12	−4	8	0	1	3	3	8	−5	2	1	2	5	4	+1

Last updated: 15 June 2024.

==== Results by round ====
Round	1	2	3	4	5	6	7	8	9	10
Ground	H	A	H	A	A	H	A	H	A	H
Result	L	L	L	D	L	L	W	D	W	
Position										

Updated to match(es) played on 15 June 2024. Source:
A = Away; H = Home; W = Win; D = Draw; L = Loss

==== Matches ====
The match schedule was released on 29 February.

14 April 2024 1	Atlético Goianiense	1–2	Flamengo	Goiânia

18 April 2024 2	Botafogo	1–0	Atlético Goianiense	Rio de Janeiro

21 April 2024 3	Atlético Goianiense	0–3	São Paulo	Goiânia

29 April 2024 4	Internacional	1–1	Atlético Goianiense	Porto Alegre

12 May 2024 6	Atlético Goianiense	0–1	Cruzeiro	Goiânia

1 June 2024 7	Vitória	0–2	Atlético Goianiense	Salvador

6 June 2024 5	Juventude	1–0	Atlético Goianiense	Caxias do Sul

12 June 2024 8	Atlético Goianiense	2–2	Corinthians	Goiânia

16 June 2024 9	Fluminense	1–2	Atlético Goianiense	Rio de Janeiro

19 June 2024 10	Atlético Goianiense	1–2	Criciúma	Goiânia

22 June 2024 11	Cuiabá	0–0	Atlético Goianiense	Cuiabá

27 June 2024 12	Atlético Goianiense	1–1	Grêmio	Goiânia

30 June 2024 13	Atlético Mineiro	1–1	Atlético Goianiense	Belo Horizonte

4 July 2024 14	Red Bull Bragantino	3–1	Atlético Goianiense	Bragança Paulista

7 July 2024 15	Atlético Goianiense	1–2	Athletico Paranaense	Goiânia

12 July 2024 16	Palmeiras	3–1	Atlético Goianiense	São Paulo

18 July 2024 17	Atlético Goianiense	0–1	Vasco da Gama	Goiânia

21 July 2024 18	Fortaleza	3–1	Atlético Goianiense	Fortaleza

25 July 2024 19	Atlético Goianiense	1–1	Bahia	Goiânia

28 July 2024 20	Flamengo	2–0	Atlético Goianiense	Rio de Janeiro

4 August 2024 21	Atlético Goianiense	1–4	Botafogo	Goiânia

11 August 2024 22	São Paulo	1–0	Atlético Goianiense	São Paulo

18 August 2024 23	Atlético Goianiense	1–0	Internacional	Goiânia

24 August 2024 24	Atlético Goianiense	2–1	Juventude	Goiânia

1 September 2024 25	Cruzeiro	3–1	Atlético Goianiense	Belo Horizonte

14 September 2024 26	Atlético Goianiense	0–2	Vitória	Goiânia

21 September 2024 27	Corinthians	3–0	Atlético Goianiense	São Paulo

29 September 2024 28	Atlético Goianiense	1–0	Fluminense	Goiânia

4 October 2024 29	Criciúma	2–0	Atlético Goianiense	Criciúma

19 October 2024 30	Atlético Goianiense	0–0	Cuiabá	Goiânia

26 October 2024 31	Grêmio	3–1	Atlético Goianiense	Porto Alegre

6 November 2024 32	Atlético Goianiense	1–0	Atlético Mineiro	Goiânia

9 November 2024 33	Atlético Goianiense	0–0	Red Bull Bragantino	Goiânia

20 November 2024 34	Athletico Paranaense	2–0	Atlético Goianiense	Curitiba

23 November 2024 35	Atlético Goianiense	0–1	Palmeiras	Goiânia

1 December 2024 36	Vasco da Gama	2–2	Atlético Goianiense	Rio de Janeiro

5 December 2024 37	Atlético Goianiense	3–1	Fortaleza	Goiânia

8 December 2024 38	Bahia	2–0	Atlético Goianiense	Salvador
