= Werton =

Brazilian footballer

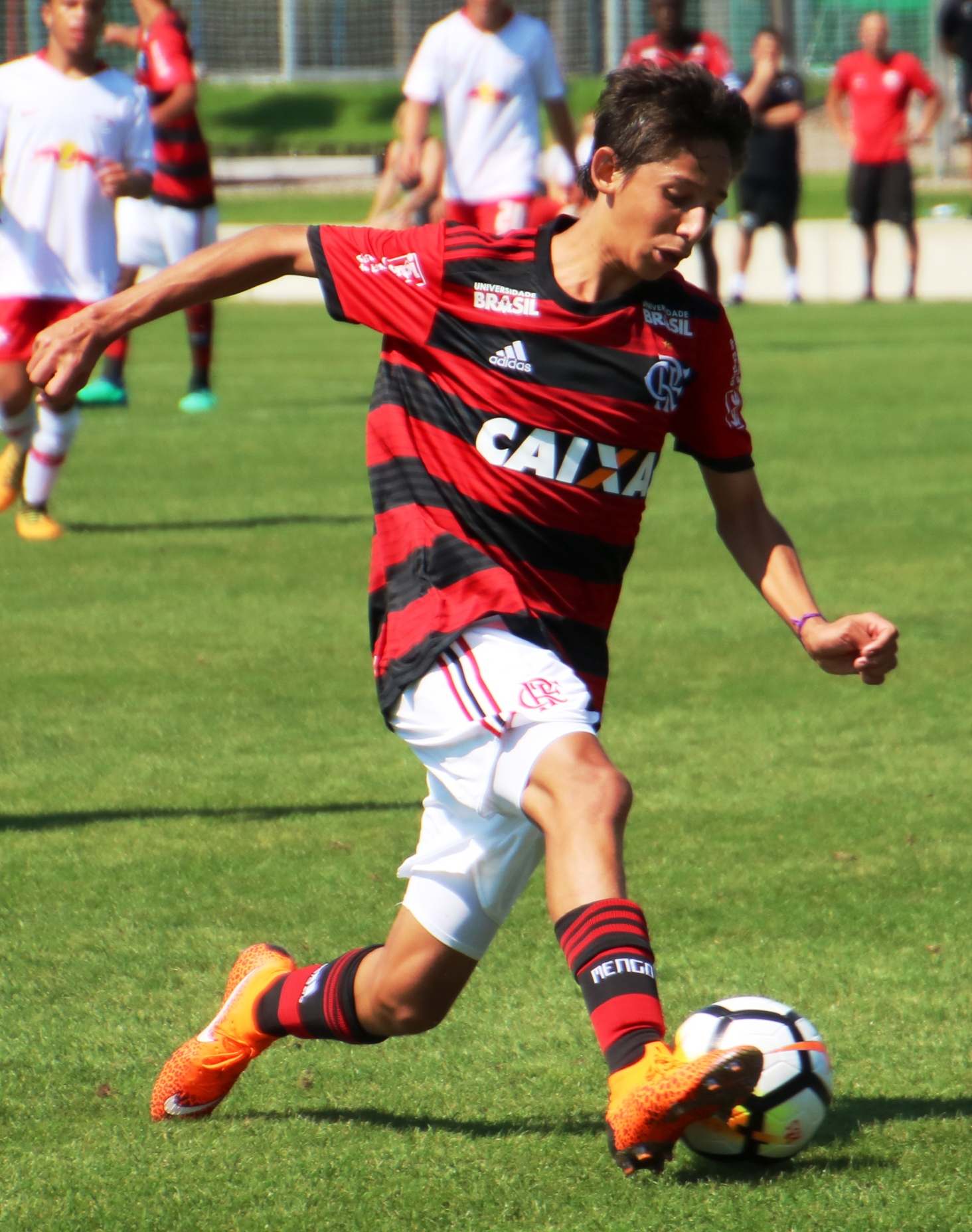

Personal information
- Full name: Werton de Almeida Rêgo
- Date of birth: 16 September 2003 (age 23)
- Place of birth: Benjamin Constant, Brazil
- Height: 1.70 m (5 ft 7 in)
- Position: Forward

Team information
- Current team: Aris Limassol (on loan from Leixões)
- Number: 99

Youth career
- 2013–2024: Flamengo

Senior career*
| Years | Team | Apps | (Gls) |
| 2021–2024 | Flamengo | 12 | (1) |
| 2024– | Leixões | 60 | (10) |
| 2026– | → Aris Limassol (loan) | 8 | (1) |

International career^{‡}
| 2021 | Brazil U18 | 3 | (1) |
- * Club domestic league appearances and goals as of 10 November 2026 ‡ National team caps and goals as of 16 November 2021

Werton de Almeida Rêgo (born 16 September 2003), simply known as Werton, is a Brazilian footballer who plays as a forward for Cypriot First Division club Aris Limassol on loan from Leixões.

== Career ==
=== Flamengo ===
Born in Benjamin Constant, Amazonas, Werton joined Flamengo's youth setup in 2013, aged nine. On 22 December 2020, he signed his first professional contract, after agreeing to a deal until 2023.

Werton made his first team – and Série A – debut on 2 July 2021, coming on as a late substitute for Bruno Henrique in a 2–0 away win against Cuiabá.

=== Leixões ===
On 10 July 2024, Werton signed with Leixões. According to reports, the Heroes of the Sea paid a €1 million transfer fee for 70% of Werton's economic rights, Flamengo retained with the remaining 30%.

On 10 August 2024, Werton made his debut for Leixões, starting and playing the full 90 minutes in a 2–1 league victory over Benfica B at the Estádio do Mar.

On 26 July 2026, Werton moved to Aris Limassol in Cyprus on loan with an option to buy.

== Career statistics ==
As of 27 October 2024

| Club | Season | League | | | State League | | Cup | | Continental | | Other | | Total | |
| Club | Season | Division | Apps | Goals | Apps | Goals | Apps | Goals | Apps | Goals | Apps | Goals | Apps | Goals |
|---|---|---|---|---|---|---|---|---|---|---|---|---|---|---|
| Flamengo | 2021 | Série A | 2 | 0 | — | | — | | — | | — | | 2 | 0 |
| Flamengo | 2022 | Série A | 2 | 1 | 1 | 0 | — | | — | | — | | 3 | 1 |
| Flamengo | 2023 | Série A | — | | 3 | 0 | — | | — | | — | | 3 | 0 |
| Flamengo | 2024 | Série A | 2 | 0 | 2 | 0 | — | | 0 | 0 | — | | 4 | 0 |
| Total | | | 6 | 1 | 6 | 0 | 0 | 0 | 0 | 0 | 0 | 0 | 12 | 1 |
| Leixões | 2024–25 | Liga Portugal 2 | 9 | 1 | — | | 1 | 0 | — | | — | | 10 | 1 |
| Career total | | | 15 | 1 | 6 | 0 | 1 | 0 | 0 | 0 | 0 | 0 | 22 | 1 |

=== Honours ===
Flamengo

- Campeonato Carioca: 2024
