= Lorran (footballer, born 2006) =

Brazilian footballer (born 2006)

Personal information
- Full name: Lorran Lucas Pereira de Sousa
- Date of birth: 4 July 2006 (age 20)
- Place of birth: Rio de Janeiro, Brazil
- Height: 1.73 m (5 ft 8 in)
- Position: Attacking midfielder

Team information
- Current team: Flamengo
- Number: 99

Youth career
- 2019–2020: Madureira
- 2020–2025: Flamengo

Senior career*
Years	Team	Apps	(Gls)
2023–	Flamengo	29	(2)
2025–2026	→ Pisa (loan)	9	(1)

International career^{‡}
2023	Brazil U17	8	(1)
- * Club domestic league appearances and goals as of 25 May 2026 ‡ National team caps and goals as of 10:37, 9 October 2023 (UTC)

Lorran Lucas Pereira de Sousa (born 4 July 2006), simply known as Lorran, is a Brazilian professional footballer who plays as an attacking midfielder for Campeonato Brasileiro Série A club Flamengo.

== Club career ==
=== Early career ===
Born in Rio de Janeiro, Lorran began his career in a social project in his hometown, before moving to Madureira at the age of 13. He impressed the scouts of Flamengo during his short period at the club, and moved to the latter club in 2020.

=== Flamengo ===
On 4 July 2022, on his 16th birthday, he signed his first professional contract with the club, until July 2025. On 26 December 2022, Lorran renewed his contract with Mengão until December 2025. He made his first team debut the following 12 January, coming on as a late substitute for goalscorer Matheus França in a 1–0 Campeonato Carioca home win over Audax Rio, as the regular starters were training for the 2022 FIFA Club World Cup.

Lorran scored his first professional goal on 25 January 2023, netting the equalizer in a 1–1 away draw against Bangu; with 16 years, six months and 20 days, he became the youngest player ever to score in Flamengo's history.

==== Pisa (loan) ====
On 3 September 2025, Lorran joined Pisa in Italy on loan with an option to buy.

== Career statistics ==
As of match played 23 May 2026.

Club	Season	League			State League		Cup		Continental		Other		Total	
Club	Season	Division	Apps	Goals	Apps	Goals	Apps	Goals	Apps	Goals	Apps	Goals	Apps	Goals
Flamengo	2023	Série A	—		4 (Note: Appearances in the Campeonato Carioca)	1	—		—		0	0	4	1
Flamengo	2024	Série A	19	1	3	0	2	0	4 (Note: Appearances in the Copa Libertadores)	0	—		28	1
Flamengo	2025	Série A	0	0	4	0	1	0	—		—		5	0
Flamengo	2026	Série A	0	0	—		—		—		—		0	0
Flamengo	Total		19	1	11	1	3	0	4	0	0	0	37	2
Pisa SC	2025–26	Serie A	9	1	—		1	0	—		—		10	1
Career total			28	2	11	1	4	0	4	0	0	0	47	3

== Honours ==
=== Youth ===
Flamengo

- Under-20 Intercontinental Cup: 2025
- U-20 Copa Libertadores: 2024

=== Professional ===
Flamengo

- Copa do Brasil: 2024
- Campeonato Carioca: 2024, 2025
