= 2024 Amazonas Futebol Clube season =

Amazonas Futebol Clube
2024 season
- Manager: Rafael Lacerda (from 27 May)
- Stadium: Estádio Municipal Carlos Zamith
- Série B: 11th
- Campeonato Amazonense: 1st phase quarter-finals
- Copa do Brasil: Third round

The 2024 Amazonas Futebol Clube season is the club's sixth season in existence and the first season ever in the second division of Brazilian football. In addition to the domestic league, Guarani are participating in this season's editions of the Campeonato Amazonense and the Copa do Brasil.

== Pre-season and friendlies ==
Win Draw Loss

== Competitions ==
=== Overall record ===
Competition	First match	Last match	Starting round	Final position	Record							
Competition	First match	Last match	Starting round	Final position	Pld	W	D	L	GF	GA	GD	Win %
Série B	20 April 2024	22 November 2024	Matchday 1	11th	38	14	10	14	31	37	−6	36.84
Campeonato Amazonense	21 January 2024	31 March 2024	1st phase	1st phase quarter-finals	12	7	2	3	23	12	+11	58.33
Copa do Brasil	22 February 2024	23 May 2024	First round	Third round	4	2	0	2	2	2	+0	50.00
Total					54	23	12	19	56	51	+5	42.59

Source: Soccerway

=== Campeonato Brasileiro Série B ===
==== League table ====
Pos	Team	Pld	W	D	L	GF	GA	GD	Pts
9	Vila Nova	38	16	7	15	42	54	−12	55
10	Avaí	38	14	11	13	34	32	+2	53
11	Amazonas	38	14	10	14	31	37	−6	52
12	Coritiba	38	14	8	16	41	44	−3	50
13	Paysandu	38	12	14	12	41	43	−2	50

Source: CBF
Rules for classification: 1) points; 2) wins; 3) goal difference; 4) goals scored; 5) head-to-head results (only between 2 teams); 6) fewest red cards; 7) fewest yellow cards; 8) drawing of lots.

==== Results summary ====
Overall								Home						Away					
Pld	W	D	L	GF	GA	GD	Pts	W	D	L	GF	GA	GD	W	D	L	GF	GA	GD
11	3	3	5	9	13	−4	12	3	1	2	7	6	+1	0	2	3	2	7	−5

==== Results by round ====
Round	1
Ground	
Result	
Position	

A = Away; H = Home; W = Win; D = Draw; L = Loss

==== Matches ====
20 April 2024 1	Amazonas	2–3	Sport

27 April 2024 2	CRB	0–0	Amazonas

6 May 2024 3	Ponte Preta	3–0	Amazonas

11 May 2024 4	Amazonas	1–0	Santos

15 May 2024 5	Ceará	2–1	Amazonas

18 May 2024 6	Amazonas	1–1	Paysandu

28 May 2024 7	Amazonas	1–0	Mirassol

3 June 2024 8	Operário Ferroviário	1–0	Amazonas

8 June 2024 9	Amazonas	2–1	Brusque

13 June 2024 10	Amazonas	0–1	Chapecoense

18 June 2024 11	Novorizontino	1–1	Amazonas

25 June 2024 12	Amazonas	1–0	Coritiba

30 June 2024 13	Avaí	1–1	Amazonas

8 July 2024 14	Amazonas	1–2	Vila Nova

12 July 2024 15	Botafogo-SP	0–1	Amazonas

20 July 2024 16	América Mineiro	0–0	Amazonas

24 July 2024 17	Amazonas	1–1	Guarani

3 August 2024 19	Amazonas	1–0	Ituano

10 August 2024 20	Sport	3–2	Amazonas

17 August 2024 21	Amazonas	2–0	CRB

20 August 2024 22	Amazonas	2–1	Ponte Preta

24 August 2024 23	Santos	0–0	Amazonas

1 September 2024 24	Amazonas	1–1	Ceará

5 September 2024 25	Paysandu	0–1	Amazonas

14 September 2024 26	Mirassol	0–0	Amazonas

18 September 2024 27	Amazonas	2–1	Operário Ferroviário

23 September 2024 28	Brusque	1–0	Amazonas

26 September 2024 29	Chapecoense	2–0	Amazonas

4 October 2024 30	Amazonas	1–0	Novorizontino

13 October 2024 31	Coritiba	3–1	Amazonas

18 October 2024 32	Amazonas	2–1	Avaí

22 October 2024 33	Vila Nova	1–0	Amazonas

25 October 2024 18	Goiás	1–0	Amazonas

29 October 2024 34	Amazonas	0–1	Botafogo-SP

5 November 2024 35	Amazonas	1–0	América Mineiro

12 November 2024 36	Guarani	0–0	Amazonas

16 November 2024 37	Amazonas	0–4	Goiás

22 November 2024 38	Ituano	0–1	Amazonas

=== Campeonato Amazonense ===
==== 1st phase ====
Group A

21 January 2024 1	Amazonas	1–2	Manauara	Manaus
				Stadium: Estádio Municipal Carlos Zamith

25 January 2024 2	Amazonas	1–1	Princesa do Solimões	Manaus
				Stadium: Estádio Municipal Carlos Zamith

28 January 2024 3	Parintins	1–1	Amazonas	Rio Preto da Eva
20:00 UTC−4				Stadium: Estádio Francisco Garcia

3 February 2024 4	Amazonas	2–0	Rio Negro	Manaus
				Stadium: Estádio Municipal Carlos Zamith

7 February 2024 5	São Raimundo	0–3	Amazonas

11 February 2024 Quarter-finals	Amazonas	4–0	Operário	Manaus
				Stadium: Estádio Municipal Carlos Zamith

17 February 2024 Semi-finals	Amazonas	2–1	Nacional	Manaus
				Stadium: Estádio Municipal Carlos Zamith

25 February 2024 Final	Amazonas	2–0	São Raimundo	Manaus
				Stadium: Estádio Municipal Carlos Zamith

==== 2nd phase ====
Group A

1 March 2024 1	Amazonas	0–0	Nacional	Manaus
				Stadium: Estádio Municipal Carlos Zamith

9 March 2024 2	Manauara	3–1	Amazonas

17 March 2024 3	Amazonas	3–1	Operário	Manaus
				Stadium: Estádio Municipal Carlos Zamith

26 March 2024 4	Unidos do Alvorada	0–2	Amazonas

31 March 2024 Quarter-finals	Amazonas	1–3	Parintins	Manaus
				Stadium: Estádio Municipal Carlos Zamith

=== Copa do Brasil ===
22 February 2024 First round	v	Amazonas
