= Andrea Mancini (footballer, born 1996) =

Italian footballer

Personal information
- Date of birth: 26 April 1996 (age 30)
- Place of birth: Pescara, Italy
- Height: 1.72 m (5 ft 8 in)
- Positions: Attacking midfielder; winger

Team information
- Current team: Puteolana

Youth career
- –2014: Pescara
- 2013–2014: → Napoli (loan)

Senior career*
Years	Team	Apps	(Gls)
2013–2017	Pescara	1	(0)
2014–2015	→ Vicenza (loan)	0	(0)
2015–2016	→ L'Aquila (loan)	8	(1)
2016–2017	→ Santarcangelo (loan)	6	(0)
2017	→ Ancona (loan)	4	(0)
2017–2018	Teramo	0	(0)
2018	Pineto	9	(1)
2018–2019	Francavilla	21	(2)
2019–2020	SC Ligorna 1922	19	(3)
2020–2021	Notaresco	20	(3)
2021–2022	FC San Giorgio	34	(7)
2022–2024	Gladiator	52	(6)
2024–2025	Portici 1906		
2025	Nola		
2025–	Puteolana		
- * Club domestic league appearances and goals as of 15 October 2026

Andrea Mancini (born 26 April 1996) is an Italian footballer who plays as a winger for Puteolana.

== Career ==
=== Pescara ===
In May 2013 Mancini received his first senior call-up against A.C. Milan from his former reserve team coach Cristian Bucchi. Before that match Pescara certainly relegated after just one season in Serie A. He substituted Emmanuel Cascione in the second half, at that time Mattia Perin, the keeper of Pescara already conceded 4 goals. He was the second youngest Serie A player of 2012–13 Serie A after Alberto Cerri, in terms of age of debut.

Mancini was a member of the under-15 youth team of Pescara in the National Giovanissimi League in the 2010–11 season. He was the member of Allievi U17 team from 2011 to 2013 season. He also played 10 games for the U19 team in Campionato Nazionale Primavera in 2012–13 season, skipping U18 team in Berretti League of the youth ladder. In the 2013–14 season, he was loaned to Serie A club Napoli, but was only able to spend his career with the reserve team.

Mancini wore no. 27 for 2014–15 Serie B.

=== Vicenza (loan) ===
On 12 September 2014 he was loaned to Serie B newcomer Vicenza Calcio. He wore no.34 shirt for Vicenza.

=== L'Aquila (loan) ===
On 9 July 2015 L'Aquila signed Mancini, Nicholas Bensaja, Luca Savelloni and Adedoyin Sanni in temporary deals from Pescara .

== Personal life ==
He is the son of Felice Mancini, former footballer and currently a football coach. Felice coached Andrea in 2010–11 season.
