= 2024 Cuiabá Esporte Clube season =

Cuiabá Esporte Clube
2024 season
- Manager: Petit (from 7 May)
- Stadium: Arena Pantanal
- Série A: 20th (relegated)
- Campeonato Matogrossense: Winners
- Copa do Brasil: Third round
- Copa Sudamericana: Knockout round play-offs
- Top goalscorer: League: Isidro Pitta (4); All: Isidro Pitta (14)
- Biggest win: Cuiabá 5–0 Dom Bosco
- Biggest defeat: Athletico Paranaense 4–0 Cuiabá
Home colours	Away colours

The 2024 season was the 25th season in the history of the Cuiabá Esporte Clube. In addition to Série A, the team participated in the Copa do Brasil.

== Competitions ==
=== Overall record ===
Competition	First match	Last match	Starting round	Final position	Record							
Competition	First match	Last match	Starting round	Final position	Pld	W	D	L	GF	GA	GD	Win %
Série A	14 April 2024	8 December 2024	Matchday 1	20th	38	6	12	20	29	49	−20	15.79
Campeonato Matogrossense	20 January 2024	6 April 2024	1st Round	Winners	13	9	4	0	27	11	+16	69.23
Copa do Brasil	22 February 2024	23 May 2024	Second round	Third round	4	2	1	1	5	2	+3	50.00
Copa Sudamericana	4 April 2024		Group stage	Knockout Round Play-off	8	3	4	1	11	6	+5	37.50
Total					63	20	21	22	72	68	+4	31.75

Source: Soccerway

=== Série A ===
==== League table ====
Pos	Team	Pld	W	D	L	GF	GA	GD	Pts	Qualification or relegation
16	Red Bull Bragantino	38	10	14	14	44	48	−4	44	
17	Athletico Paranaense (R)	38	11	9	18	40	46	−6	42	Relegation to Campeonato Brasileiro Série B
18	Criciúma (R)	38	9	11	18	42	61	−19	38	Relegation to Campeonato Brasileiro Série B
19	Atlético Goianiense (R)	38	7	9	22	29	58	−29	30	Relegation to Campeonato Brasileiro Série B
20	Cuiabá (R)	38	6	12	20	29	49	−20	30	Relegation to Campeonato Brasileiro Série B

Source: CBF
Rules for classification: 1) points; 2) wins; 3) goal difference; 4) goals scored; 5) head-to-head results (only between two teams); 6) fewest red cards; 7) fewest yellow cards; 8) drawing of lots.
(R) Relegated

==== Results summary ====
Overall								Home						Away					
Pld	W	D	L	GF	GA	GD	Pts	W	D	L	GF	GA	GD	W	D	L	GF	GA	GD
12	3	3	6	13	16	−3	12	1	2	3	5	6	−1	2	1	3	8	10	−2

Last updated: 26 June 2024.

==== Results by round ====
Round	1	2	3	4	5	6	7	8	9	10	11	12
Ground	A	H	A	H	H	A	H	A	H	A	H	A
Result	L	D	L	L	L	W	L	L	W	W	D	D
Position												

Updated to match(es) played on 26 June 2024. Source:
A = Away; H = Home; W = Win; D = Draw; L = Loss

==== Matches ====
The match schedule was released on 29 February.

14 April 2024 1	Athletico Paranaense	4–0	Cuiabá	Curitiba
				Stadium: Arena da Baixada; Referee: Jonathan Benkenstein Pinheiro

20 April 2024 2	Grêmio	1–0	Cuiabá	Porto Alegre
				Stadium: Arena do Grêmio; Referee: Bruno Pereira Vasconcelos

27 April 2024 4	Cuiabá	0–3	Atlético Mineiro	Cuiabá
				Stadium: Arena Pantanal

5 May 2024 5	Cuiabá	0–2	Palmeiras	Cuiabá
				Stadium: Arena Pantanal

1 June 2024 7	Cuiabá	0–1	Internacional	Cuiabá
				Stadium: Arena Pantanal

6 June 2024 2	Cuiabá	0–0	Vitória	Cuiabá
				Stadium: Arena Pantanal

9 June 2024 6	Criciúma	2–5	Cuiabá	Criciúma
				Stadium: Estádio Heriberto Hülse; Referee: Bruno Arleu de Araujo

13 June 2024 8	Cruzeiro	2–1	Cuiabá	Belo Horizonte
				Stadium: Mineirão; Referee: Marcelo de Lima Henrique

16 June 2024 9	Cuiabá	5–0	Fortaleza	Cuiabá
17:30 UTC−4	Clayson 3'; Ramon 11'; Cafú 37'; Pitta 45+8'; Fernando Sobral 54' (pen.)			Stadium: Arena Pantanal; Referee: Jefferson Ferreira de Moraes

19 June 2024 10	São Paulo	0–1	Cuiabá	São Paulo
20:00 UTC−3			Eliel 82'	Stadium: Estádio do Morumbi; Attendance: 33,534; Referee: Gustavo Ervino Bauermann

22 June 2024 11	Cuiabá	0–0	Atlético Goianiense	Cuiabá
				Stadium: Arena Pantanal

26 June 2024 12	Corinthians	1–1	Cuiabá	São Paulo
20:00 UTC−3	Matheus Bidu 86'		Marllon 5'; Pitta (penalty missed) 56'	Stadium: Arena Corinthians; Referee: Fabio Augusto Santos Sá Junior

=== Campeonato Matogrossense ===
20 January 2024 1	Cuiabá	1–1	Primavera MG	Cuiabá
				Stadium: Arena Pantanal

24 January 2024 2	CEOV Operário	2–2	Cuiabá

27 January 2024 3	Cuiabá	5–0	Dom Bosco	Cuiabá
				Stadium: Arena Pantanal

2 February 2024 4	Luverdense	1–2	Cuiabá

5 February 2024 5	Mixto	1–2	Cuiabá

9 February 2024 6	Cuiabá	1–1	União Rondonópolis	Cuiabá
				Stadium: Arena Pantanal

16 February 2024 7	Cuiabá	3–0	Araguaia	Cuiabá
				Stadium: Arena Pantanal

18 February 2024 8	Academia	0–2	Cuiabá

25 February 2024 9	Cuiabá	2–2	Nova Mutum EC	Cuiabá
				Stadium: Arena Pantanal

==== Semi-finals ====
17 March 2024 First leg	Luverdense	0–1	Cuiabá	Lucas do Rio Verde
17:00 UTC−4			Ian 54' (o.g.)	Stadium: Estádio Passo das Emas; Referee: Leonardo Willers Lorenzatto

24 March 2024 Second leg	Cuiabá	4–3 (5–3 agg.)	Luverdense	Cuiabá
17:30 UTC−4	Sobral 16'; Bruno Alves 29'; Deyverson 53', 56'		Joãozinho 54'; Rangel 68', 90+3'	Stadium: Arena Pantanal; Referee: Eleniel Benedito da Silva

==== Finals ====
30 March 2024 First leg	Cuiabá	1–0	União Rondonópolis	Cuiabá
15:30 UTC−4	Pitta 45+3'			Stadium: Arena Pantanal; Referee: Luiz Paulo de Moura

6 April 2024 Second leg	União Rondonópolis	0–1 (0–2 agg.)	Cuiabá	Rondonópolis
15:30 UTC−4			Clayson 25'; (red card) 90'; (red card) 90+4'	Stadium: Estádio Engenheiro Luthero Lopes; Referee: Leonardo Willers Lorenzatto

=== Copa Sudamericana ===
==== Group stage ====
4 April 2024 1	Cuiabá (Brazil)	1–1	(Argentina) Lanús	Cuiabá
				Stadium: Arena Pantanal

12 April 2024 2	Metropolitanos (Venezuela)	0–2	(Brazil) Cuiabá	Caracas, Venezuela
				Stadium: Olympic Stadium; Referee: Álex Cajas (Ecuador)

23 April 2024 3	Deportivo Garcilaso (Peru)	1–1	(Brazil) Cuiabá	Cusco, Peru
				Stadium: Estadio Garcilaso; Referee: Augusto Aragón (Ecuador)

9 May 2024 4	Cuiabá (Brazil)	3–0	(Venezuela) Metropolitanos	Cuiabá
				Stadium: Arena Pantanal

16 May 2024 5	Cuiabá (Brazil)	1–1	(Peru) Deportivo Garcilaso	Cuiabá
				Stadium: Arena Pantanal

30 May 2024 6	Lanús (Argentina)	0–1	(Brazil) Cuiabá	Lanús, Argentina
				Stadium: Estadio Ciudad de Lanús – Néstor Díaz Pérez; Referee: Gery Vargas (Bolivia)

==== Knockout round play-offs ====
18 July 2024 First leg	Palestino (Chile)	v	(Brazil) Cuiabá	Chile

25 July 2024 Second leg	Cuiabá (Brazil)	v	(Chile) Palestino	Cuiabá
				Stadium: Arena Pantanal

== Statistics ==
=== Goalscorers ===
Position	Players	Série A	Campeonato Matogrossense	Copa do Brasil	Copa Sudamericana	Total
FW	(Paraguay) Isidro Pitta	3	6	1	4	14
FW	(Brazil) Deyverson	0	4	0	2	6
MF	(Brazil) Clayson	3	3	0	0	6
MF	(Brazil) Fernando Sobral	1	0	0	3	4
DF	(Brazil) Ramon	2	0	0	0	2
FW	(Brazil) Jonathan Cafú	1	0	0	0	1
MF	(Brazil) Max	1	0	0	0	1
