= Weliton =

Brazilian footballer (born 2005)

Personal information
- Full name: Weliton Santos do Amaral
- Date of birth: 13 April 2005 (age 21)
- Place of birth: Soledade, Brazil
- Height: 1.86 m (6 ft 1 in)
- Position: Forward

Team information
- Current team: Flamengo U20 (on loan from Juventude)

Youth career
- 2016–: Juventude
- 2023–: → Flamengo (loan)

Senior career*
Years	Team	Apps	(Gls)
2022–	Juventude	1	(0)
- * Club domestic league appearances and goals as of 04:37, 13 October 2022 (UTC)

Weliton Santos do Amaral (born 13 April 2005), simply known as Weliton, is a Brazilian footballer who plays as a forward for the under-20 team of Flamengo, on loan from Juventude.

== Club career ==
Born in Soledade, Rio Grande do Sul, Weliton joined Juventude's youth setup in 2016, aged eleven. He made his first team – and Série A – debut on 3 September 2022, coming on as a late substitute for Chico in a 1–1 home draw against Avaí.

On 3 March 2023, Weliton was loaned to Flamengo until January 2024, with a buyout clause.

== Career statistics ==
As of 13 October 2022

Club	Season	League			State League		Cup		Continental		Other		Total	
Club	Season	Division	Apps	Goals	Apps	Goals	Apps	Goals	Apps	Goals	Apps	Goals	Apps	Goals
Juventude	2022	Série A	1	0	0	0	0	0	—		—		1	0
Career total			1	0	0	0	0	0	0	0	0	0	1	0
