= Felice Mancini =

Italian footballer and coach

Personal information
- Date of birth: 10 June 1965 (age 61)
- Place of birth: Rome, Italy
- Height: 1.76 m (5 ft 9 in)
- Position: Midfielder

Senior career*
Years	Team	Apps	(Gls)
1984–1990	Pescara	19	(0)
1985–1986	→ Frosinone (loan)	21	(0)
1988–1990	→ Lanciano (loan)	41	(5)
1990–1991	Martina	24	(2)
1992–1993	Civitanovese	24	(2)
Total		129	(9)

Managerial career
- 2001–2003: Notaresco
- 2004–2005: Penne
- 2006–2007: Montesilvano
- 2007: Notaresco
- 2008: Pescara (youth)
- 2008–2009: Silvi
- Pescara (youth)
- 2016–2017: Pescara U17
- * Club domestic league appearances and goals

Felice Mancini (born 10 June 1965) is an Italian former footballer, who played as a midfielder, and a current coach.

== Career ==
Born in Rome, capital of Italy, Mancini started his professional career at Abruzzo club Pescara, where he played a few Serie A and Serie B games during his 6-year contract, He also left the club in temporary deal for various Serie C2 club, for Frosinone (from Lazio region) and Lanciano (Abruzzo region). In November 1990, he finally left the club for the Apulia club Martina.

Mancini without a club for a season. In 1992–93, he joined the Marche team Civitanovese.

After retirement, he became a head coach for an amateur team in Abruzzo. In May 2004 he obtained a coaching license as youth team coach. He was appointed as the coach of Notaresco of Eccellenza Abruzzo in October 2007 but the chairman retreated the decision few days later.

In January 2008, he was appointed as the coach of Pescara's Esordienti team (under-13 team). Mancini also led Giovanissimi B team (under-14 team) in the provincial youth league.

Mancini returned to amateur football in July 2008 as the coach of Silvi (Promozione).

Since 2009–10 season he was the coach of Giovanissimi under-15 team.

In May 2012 he obtained Italian II-class coaching license, which equivalent to UEFA A License, made Mancini eligible to coach Lega Pro clubs or as vice-coach of Serie A and Serie B teams. However, along with Cristian Bucchi, who also freshly obtained their license, they remained in youth coaching for Pescara.

== Personal life ==
He is the father of Andrea Mancini.
