= Estádio Municipal Carlos Zamith =

Stadium in Brazil

Carlos Zamith
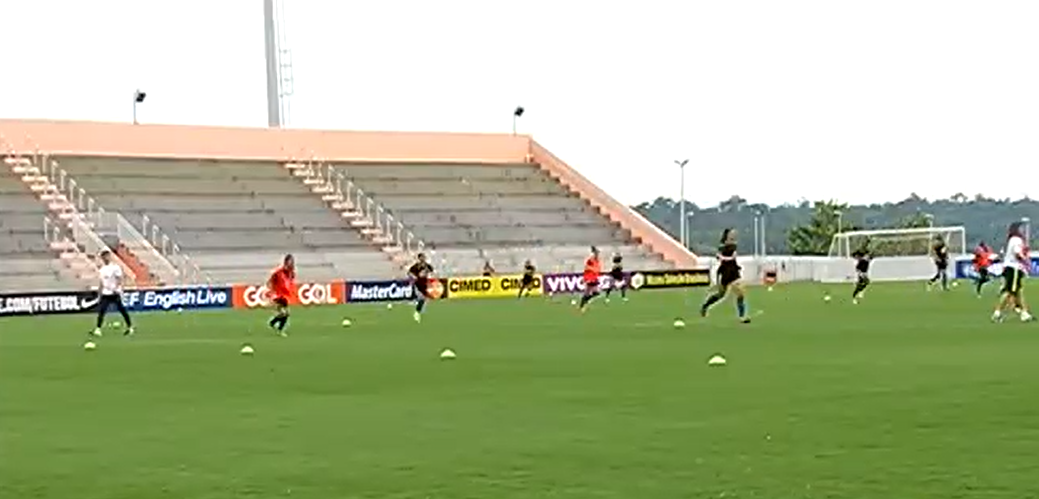
- Interactive map of Carlos Zamith
- Full name: Estádio Municipal Carlos Zamith
- Location: Manaus, Brazil
- Coordinates: 3.0836082691538964°S 59.9839886153415°W
- Owner: State of Amazonas
- Operator: State of Amazonas
- Capacity: 6,500
- Surface: Natural grass
- Record attendance: 6,500 (Amazonas vs Portuguesa-RJ, 28 August 2022)
- Field size: 105 × 68 m

Construction
- Groundbreaking: August 2013
- Built: 2014
- Opened: 6 July 2014
- Cost: ~R$ 23 million

Tenants
- Amazonas; Manauara; Manaus; Nacional; Rio Negro

Estádio Municipal Carlos Zamith is a multi-use stadium in Manaus, Amazonas, Brazil. It is used mostly for football matches, and has a maximum capacity of 6,500 people.

Initially projected to be a training center for the 2014 FIFA World Cup, the construction of the stadium began on 5 August 2013, and had an initial cost of R$ 14 million. Named after Carlos Zamith, a notable sports journalist of the state who had died at the time, the stadium had a symbolic inauguration on 24 May 2014, with state governor José Melo de Oliveira providing the first kick.

Carlos Zamith's first official match occurred on 6 July 2014, a Campeonato Amazonense de Juniores match between Manaus FC and Manaus EC.
