= Simone Mancini =

Italian footballer

Personal information
- Date of birth: 7 January 1999 (age 27)
- Place of birth: Latina, Italy
- Height: 1.92 m (6 ft 4 in)
- Position: Forward

Team information
- Current team: Anzio

Youth career
- –2017: Juventus
- 2016–2017: → Pescara (loan)
- 2017–2019: Pescara

Senior career*
Years	Team	Apps	(Gls)
2018–2021	Pescara	0	(0)
2018–2019	→ Fano (loan)	6	(0)
2020	→ Hibernians (loan)	2	(0)
2020–2021	→ Foligno (loan)	24	(5)
2021	→ Recanatese (loan)	9	(1)
2021–2022	Olbia	27	(2)
2022	Ligorna	13	(0)
2022–2024	Chieti	38	(1)
2024–2025	Sasso Marconi	33	(3)
2025	Fiorenzuola		
2025–	Anzio	9	(0)
- * Club domestic league appearances and goals as of 1 March 2026

Simone Mancini (born 7 January 1999) is an Italian professional footballer who plays as a forward for Serie D club Anzio.

== Club career ==
Born in Latina, Mancini started his career in Juventus and Pescara youth sector.

He was promoted to the first team for the 2018–19 season, and was loaned to Serie C club Fano. Mancini made his professional debut on 7 November 2018 against Ternana.

On 2 February 2020, he was loaned to Maltese Premier League club Hibernians. He only played two matches after the season was canceled due COVID-19 pandemic.

On 22 September 2020, he was loaned to Serie D club Foligno.

On 13 April 2021, he joined on loan to Serie D club Recanatese for the rest of the season.

On 21 August 2021, he left Pescara and signed with Serie C club Olbia.

On 10 December 2022, Mancini signed for Chieti.
