= Valentín Mancini =

Argentine footballer

Personal information
- Date of birth: 2 June 2003 (age 23)
- Place of birth: Arroyito, Córdoba, Argentina
- Height: 1.64 m (5 ft 5 in)
- Position: Winger

Team information
- Current team: Panathinaikos B
- Number: 45

Youth career
- Aldosivi

Senior career*
Years	Team	Apps	(Gls)
2022–2024	Aldosivi	4	(0)
2023–2024	→ Panathinaikos B (loan)	18	(0)
2024–	Panathinaikos B	11	(0)
- * Club domestic league appearances and goals as of 1 June 2024

Valentín Mancini (born 2 June 2003) is an Argentine professional footballer who plays as a winger for Greek Super League 2 club Panathinaikos B.

== Personal life ==
He is the younger brother of Panathinaikos player, Daniel Mancini.
