= Nicholas Bensaja =

Italian footballer

Personal information
- Date of birth: 7 June 1995 (age 31)
- Place of birth: Rome, Italy
- Height: 1.78 m (5 ft 10 in)
- Position: Midfielder

Team information
- Current team: Grosseto
- Number: 21

Youth career
- –2013: Roma

Senior career*
Years	Team	Apps	(Gls)
2013	Sulmona	14	(0)
2013–2014	Monopoli	10	(1)
2014–2015	Civitanovese	31	(2)
2015–2018	Pescara	0	(0)
2015–2016	→ L'Aquila (loan)	27	(1)
2016–2017	→ Catanzaro (loan)	7	(0)
2017–2018	→ Paganese (loan)	34	(2)
2018–2019	Imolese	32	(0)
2019–2021	Viterbese	50	(3)
2021–2022	Lucchese	15	(0)
2022	→ Paganese (loan)	12	(0)
2022–2023	Imolese	27	(1)
2023–	Grosseto	15	(0)
- * Club domestic league appearances and goals as of 21 December 2023

Nicholas Bensaja (born 7 June 1995) is an Italian footballer who plays as a midfielder for Serie C Group B club Grosseto.

== Club career ==
He made his Serie C debut for L'Aquila on 6 September 2015 in a game against Pistoiese.

On 17 September 2019, he signed with Viterbese.

On 11 August 2021, he joined Lucchese on a two-year contract. On 31 January 2022, Bensaja returned to Paganese on loan.
