= Matheus Mancini =

Brazilian footballer

Matheus Mancini Pinto
Personal information
- Date of birth: 14 September 1994 (age 32)
- Place of birth: São Paulo, Brazil
- Height: 1.90 m (6 ft 3 in)
- Position: Centre-back

Team information
- Current team: Ituano

Youth career
- –2013: Olé Brasil
- 2012: → Comercial (loan)
- 2013–2014: Botafogo-SP
- 2014: → Grêmio (loan)

Senior career*
Years	Team	Apps	(Gls)
2013–2017	Botafogo-SP	24	(0)
2017–2020	Atlético Mineiro	12	(0)
2018	→ Londrina (loan)	3	(0)
2019–2020	→ Académica (loan)	0	(0)
2020	→ Confiança (loan)	41	(2)
2021	Ituano	20	(1)
2022	Inter de Limeira	8	(0)
2022	Vila Nova	5	(1)
2023	Santo André	11	(0)
2023	Criciúma	5	(0)
2024	Guarani	4	(0)
2025–	Ituano	64	(6)
- * Club domestic league appearances and goals as of 11 November 2025

Matheus Mancini (born 14 September 1994) is a Brazilian professional footballer who plays as a central defender for Ituano.

== Career ==
Born in São Paulo, Mancini started his youth career at Olé Brasil and went on loan to Comercial in 2012. In 2013, he joined Botafogo-SP and had a brief loan spell at Grêmio's under-20 team in 2014. He made his senior debut on 8 April 2015, coming on as a substitute for Botafogo in a 3–1 away win against Mogi Mirim, for that year's Campeonato Paulista. Later that year, Botafogo were crowned champions of the Campeonato Brasileiro Série D.

On 18 April 2017, Mancini transferred to Atlético Mineiro on a two-year contract. He was initially assigned to the reserve squad, but joined the senior team after one month. He made his debut for the club on 25 June 2017, playing the full 90 minutes of the 1–0 away win over Chapecoense, for the Série A. He finished his first season at Atlético with a total of six appearances.

On 20 August 2018, Mancini joined Série B club Londrina on loan from Atlético.

== Personal life ==
He is the son of former footballer and current manager Vágner Mancini.

== Honours ==
Botafogo-SP

- Campeonato Brasileiro Série D: 2015

Confiança

- Campeonato Sergipano: 2020
