= Vagner Mancini =

Brazilian football manager and former player

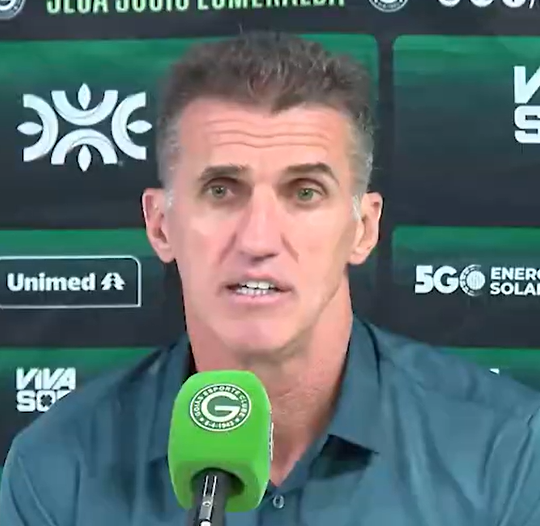
- Mancini in 2025

Personal information
- Full name: Vagner do Carmo Mancini
- Date of birth: 24 October 1966 (age 60)
- Place of birth: Ribeirão Preto, Brazil
- Height: 1.85 m (6 ft 1 in)
- Position: Midfielder

Team information
- Current team: Red Bull Bragantino (head coach)

Senior career*
Years	Team	Apps	(Gls)
1988–1989	Guarani	13	(3)
1990–1991	Portuguesa	33	(10)
1992	Bragantino	14	(1)
1994	Botafogo-SP		
1995	Grêmio	16	(1)
1996	São José-SP		
1997	Coritiba	12	(0)
1998	Ponte Preta	9	(1)
1999	Sãocarlense		
2000–2003	Etti Jundiaí		
2002	→ Ceará (loan)		
2003	Figueirense	13	(0)
2003	Sport		
2004	Ituano		
2004	Paulista		

Managerial career
- 2004–2007: Paulista
- 2007: Al Nasr
- 2008: Grêmio
- 2008–2009: Vitória
- 2009: Santos
- 2009: Vitória
- 2010: Vasco da Gama
- 2010: Guarani
- 2011: Ceará
- 2011–2012: Cruzeiro
- 2012: Sport
- 2013: Náutico
- 2013: Atlético Paranaense
- 2014: Botafogo
- 2015–2016: Vitória
- 2017: Chapecoense
- 2017–2018: Vitória
- 2019: São Paulo (interim)
- 2019: Atlético Mineiro
- 2020: Atlético Goianiense
- 2020–2021: Corinthians
- 2021: América Mineiro
- 2021–2022: Grêmio
- 2022–2023: América Mineiro
- 2023–2024: Ceará
- 2024: Atlético Goianiense
- 2024: Goiás
- 2025: Goiás
- 2025–: Red Bull Bragantino
- * Club domestic league appearances and goals

Vagner do Carmo Mancini (born 24 October 1966), nicknamed "Vagner Machine" is a Brazilian professional football coach and former player who played as a midfielder. He is the current head coach of Red Bull Bragantino.

== Playing career ==
Born in Ribeirão Preto, São Paulo, Mancini started his career with Guarani in 1988. He subsequently went on to represent Portuguesa, Bragantino and Botafogo-SP before joining Grêmio in 1995.

Mancini featured sparingly for the club during the season, being crowned champions of 1995 Copa Libertadores but losing the 1995 Copa do Brasil to Corinthians; he was sent off in the first leg of the latter competition's final. Subsequently, he went on to play for São José-SP, Coritiba, Ponte Preta, Sãocarlense, Ceará, Figueirense, Sport, Ituano and Paulista, retiring with the latter in 2004 at the age of 37.

In 1999, while injured at Sãocarlense, Mancini took over as an interim coach for ten days, but according to himself, he never effectively coached the club.

== Coaching career ==
In May 2004, while still actively playing for Paulista, Mancini opted to retire after receiving a coaching offer. He was crowned champions of the 2005 Copa do Brasil with the side before accepting an offer from Al Nasr SC in April 2007.

On 10 December 2007, Mancini returned to Brazil after being appointed head coach of former club Grêmio. He was sacked the following 14 February, despite being unbeaten, and was named Vitória head coach on 25 March.

On 15 February 2009, Mancini left Vitória and was announced as head coach of Santos. Relieved from his duties on 13 July, he returned to Vitória on 12 August.

On 11 December 2009, Mancini was appointed head coach of Vasco da Gama, but was dismissed on 25 March of the following year. On 15 April 2010 he was presented at another club he represented as a player, Guarani, but after failing to avoid relegation, he resigned on 5 December.

On 26 September 2011, after a short stint at Ceará, Mancini was appointed as new head coach of Cruzeiro. The following 10 May, he resigned after being knocked out of two competitions in the same week.

On 15 May 2012, Mancini signed with Sport (another club he represented as a player) until the end of the year. He was sacked on 11 August, and joined Náutico the following 1 February.

Dismissed on 8 April 2013, Mancini was appointed at the helm of Atlético Paranaense on 10 July, with the club in the relegation places. He managed to reach the finals of the 2013 Copa do Brasil, while also finishing third in the league; his contract, nonetheless, was not renewed.

After two consecutive relegations with Botafogo and Vitória, Mancini was appointed as new head coach of Chapecoense on 9 December 2016. He was relieved from his duties on 4 July 2017, after a 3–3 draw against Fluminense.

On 25 July 2017, Mancini returned to Vitória for a fourth stint, and managed to narrowly avoid relegation at the end of the season. On 29 July of the following year, after a 4–0 loss at Atlético Paranaense, he was dismissed.

On 2 January 2019, Mancini joined São Paulo FC as the club's technical coordinator. On 14 February, he was named interim coach after the club announced a deal with Cuca, out due to health problems; in April, as Cuca was given the green light to manage, he returned to his previous role.

On 14 October 2019, after leaving São Paulo, Mancini was appointed head coach of Atlético Mineiro until the end of the season, and left the club after four wins in 13 matches. On 25 June 2020, he replaced dismissed Cristóvão Borges at the helm of fellow top tier side Atlético Goianiense.

On 12 October 2020, Mancini was appointed head coach of Corinthians, signing a contract until the end of 2021. On 16 May of the following year, after being knocked out of the 2021 Campeonato Paulista, he was sacked.

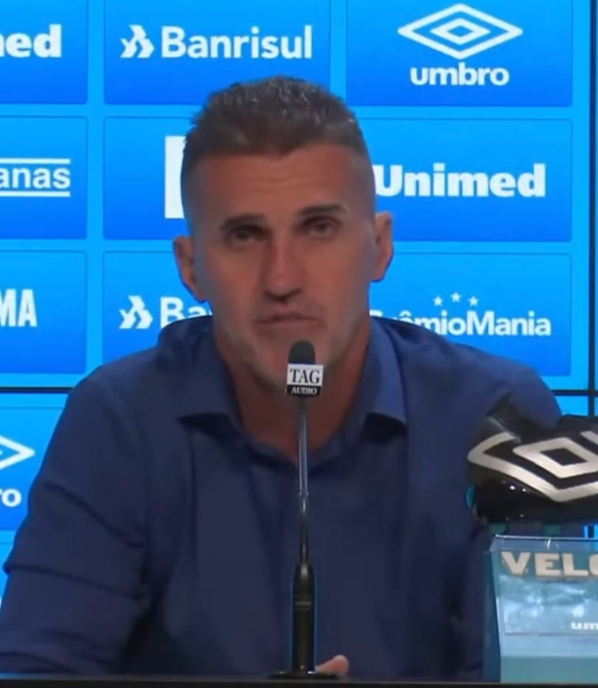
Mancini as head coach of Grêmio in 2021

On 19 June 2021, Mancini was appointed head coach of another top tier side, América Mineiro. He resigned on 14 October, and was named at the helm of Grêmio for a second spell just hours later.

Mancini was unable to avoid Grêmio's relegation, and was subsequently sacked on 14 February 2022. On 12 April, he returned to América in the place of Marquinhos Santos.

On 7 August 2023, Mancini was dismissed by América after a poor league run. Late in the month he returned to Ceará, with the club in the second division.

Mancini was sacked from Ceará on 26 June 2024, after four winless matches, and returned to Atlético Goianiense on 4 July. He was also dismissed from the latter on 4 August, after seven winless matches in charge, and moved to neighbouring Goiás two days later.

Mancini led Goiás to seven consecutive wins in the last seven matches of the season, but announced his departure from the club 21 November 2024, three days before the season's end. On 26 March 2025, however, he returned to the club, but was sacked on 13 October.

On 30 October 2025, Mancini signed a contract with Red Bull Bragantino until the end of the year.

== Personal life ==
Mancini is the son of the footballer Vastinho. His son, Matheus, is a centre back who currently plays for Confiança.

He is also known to have edited his own Wikipedia article.

== Coaching statistics ==
As of 2 November 2026

Coaching record by team and tenure
Team	Nat	From	To	Record								Ref
Team	Nat	From	To	G	W	D	L	GF	GA	GD	Win %	Ref
Paulista	(Brazil)	17 May 2004	29 April 2007	155	63	39	53	249	224	+25	40.65	
Al-Nasr SC	(United Arab Emirates)	30 April 2007	1 December 2007	11	3	3	5	17	21	−4	27.27	
Grêmio	(Brazil)	10 December 2007	14 February 2008	6	4	2	0	10	3	+7	66.67	
Vitória	(Brazil)	25 March 2008	14 February 2009	54	25	9	20	88	67	+21	46.30	
Santos	(Brazil)	15 February 2009	13 July 2009	29	14	9	6	48	36	+12	48.28	
Vitória	(Brazil)	12 August 2009	6 December 2009	23	6	6	11	28	37	−9	26.09	
Vasco da Gama	(Brazil)	11 December 2009	25 March 2010	18	10	4	4	29	13	+16	55.56	
Guarani	(Brazil)	15 April 2010	5 December 2010	38	8	13	17	33	53	−20	21.05	
Ceará	(Brazil)	31 March 2011	11 September 2011	36	16	8	12	57	48	+9	44.44	
Cruzeiro	(Brazil)	26 September 2011	10 May 2012	30	14	7	9	59	36	+23	46.67	
Sport Recife	(Brazil)	15 May 2012	11 August 2012	15	3	4	8	12	22	−10	20.00	
Náutico	(Brazil)	1 February 2013	7 April 2013	14	9	0	5	36	16	+20	64.29	
Atlético Paranaense	(Brazil)	10 May 2013	28 December 2013	42	20	12	10	61	42	+19	47.62	
Botafogo	(Brazil)	16 April 2014	10 December 2014	42	10	7	25	38	61	−23	23.81	
Vitória	(Brazil)	4 June 2015	10 September 2016	76	33	19	24	113	86	+27	43.42	
Chapecoense	(Brazil)	9 December 2016	4 July 2017	46	21	10	15	64	53	+11	45.65	
Vitória	(Brazil)	25 July 2017	29 July 2018	63	27	15	21	100	88	+12	42.86	
São Paulo (interim)	(Brazil)	14 February 2019	April 2019	9	3	4	2	8	6	+2	33.33	
São Paulo (interim)	(Brazil)	26 September 2019	27 September 2019	1	0	0	1	0	2	−2	0.00	
Atlético Mineiro	(Brazil)	14 October 2019	11 December 2019	13	4	5	4	15	14	+1	30.77	
Atlético Goianiense	(Brazil)	25 June 2020	11 October 2020	18	5	6	7	18	23	−5	27.78	
Corinthians	(Brazil)	11 October 2020	16 May 2021	45	20	13	12	57	46	+11	44.44	
América Mineiro	(Brazil)	19 June 2021	14 October 2021	21	7	9	5	24	23	+1	33.33	
Grêmio	(Brazil)	14 October 2021	14 February 2022	18	9	3	6	31	26	+5	50.00	
América Mineiro	(Brazil)	12 April 2022	7 August 2023	94	37	21	36	132	125	+7	39.36	
Ceará	(Brazil)	30 August 2023	26 June 2024	44	15	15	14	60	52	+8	34.09	
Atlético Goianiense	(Brazil)	4 July 2024	4 August 2024	7	0	2	5	5	15	−10	0.00	
Goiás	(Brazil)	7 August 2024	24 November 2024	21	11	6	4	31	13	+18	52.38	
Goiás	(Brazil)	26 March 2025	13 October 2025	32	14	10	8	35	28	+7	43.75	
Red Bull Bragantino	(Brazil)	30 October 2025	present	63	26	15	22	87	63	+24	41.27	
Total				1,085	437	277	371	1,545	1,342	+203	40.28	—

== Honours ==
=== Player ===
Grêmio

- Campeonato Gaúcho: 1995
- Copa Libertadores: 1995

Figueirense

- Campeonato Catarinense: 2003

=== Coach ===
Paulista

- Copa do Brasil: 2005

Vitória

- Campeonato Baiano: 2008, 2016

Ceará

- Campeonato Cearense: 2011, 2024

Chapecoense

- Campeonato Catarinense: 2017

== See also ==
- List of football managers with the most matches
