= List of CR Flamengo records and statistics =

This is a list of statistics and records related to Clube de Regatas do Flamengo. Flamengo is a Brazilian professional association football club based in Rio de Janeiro, RJ, that currently plays in the Campeonato Brasileiro Série A.

== Football honours ==
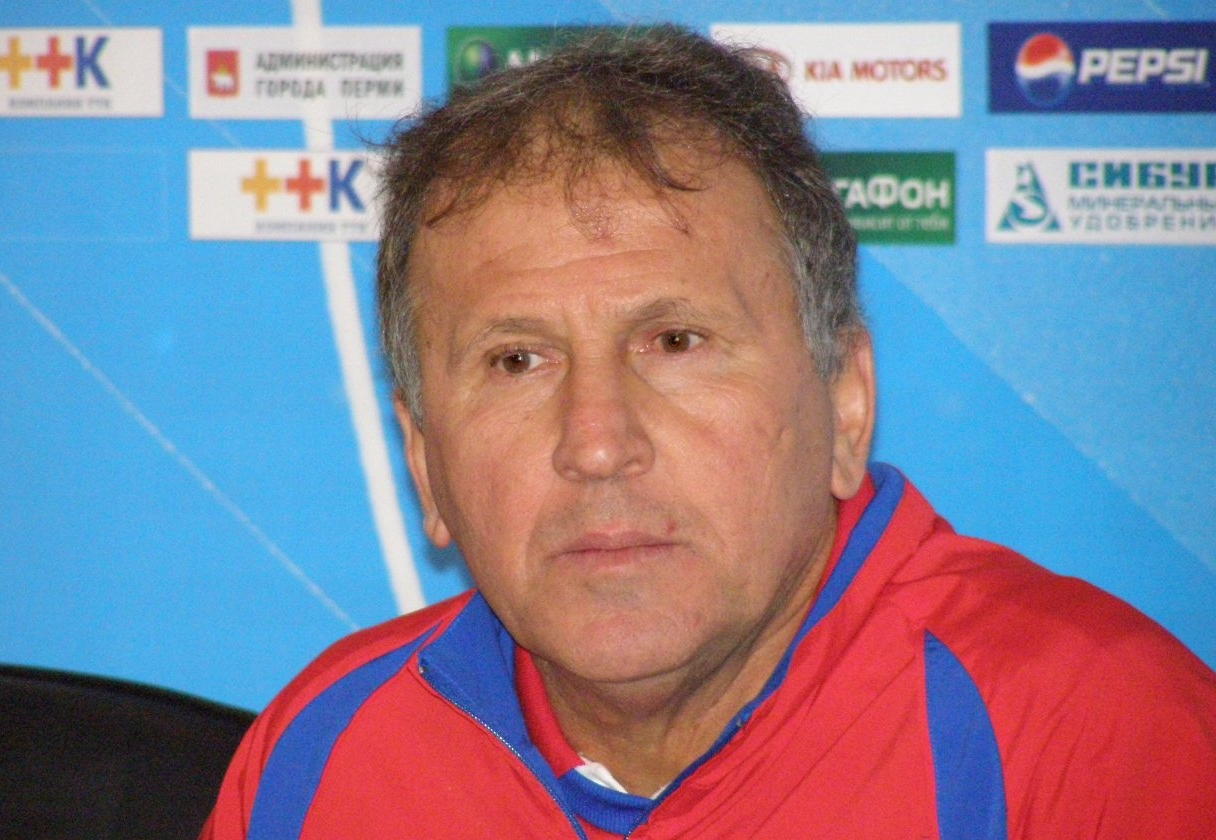
Zico, Flamengo's all-time leading scorer

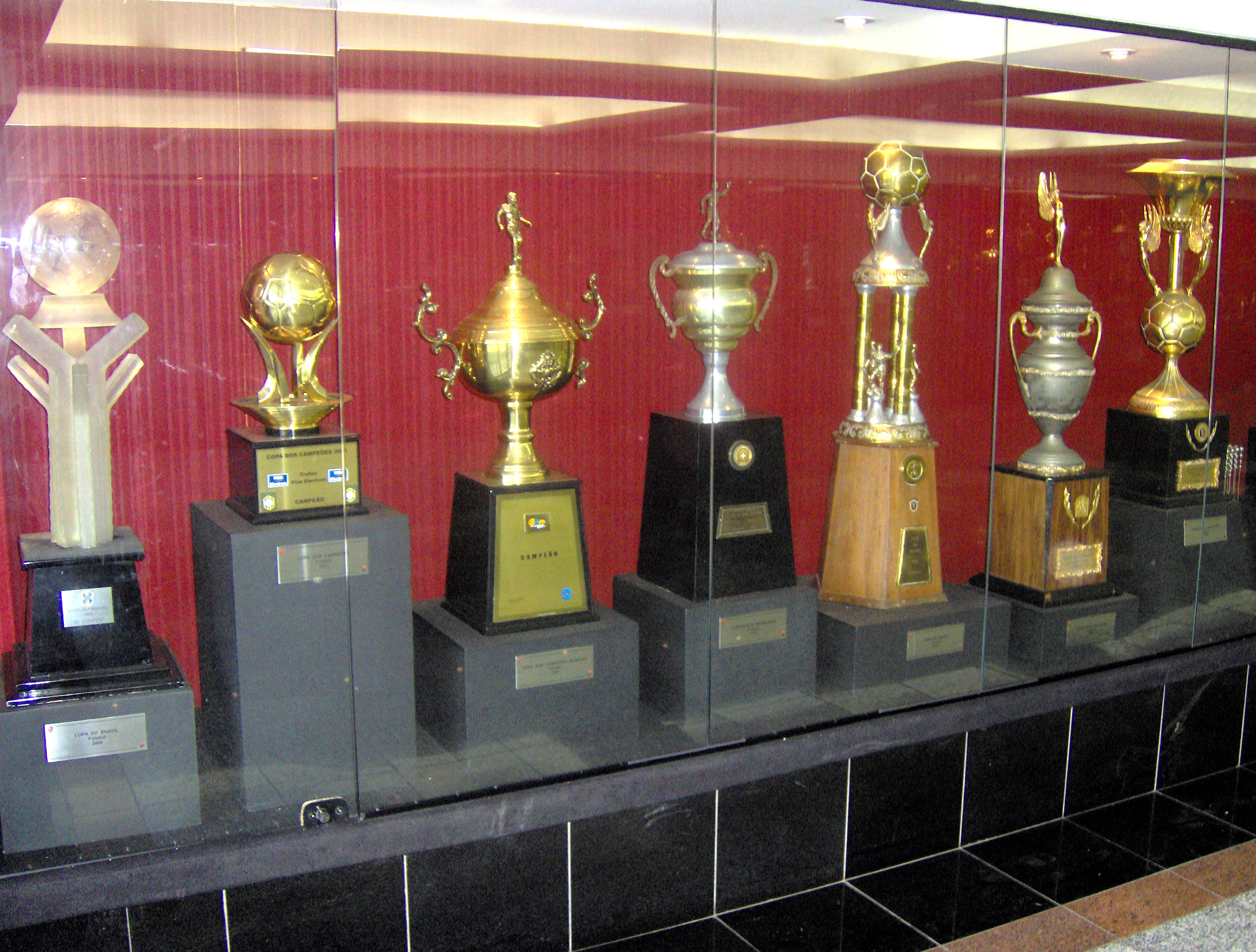
Club's trophy room.

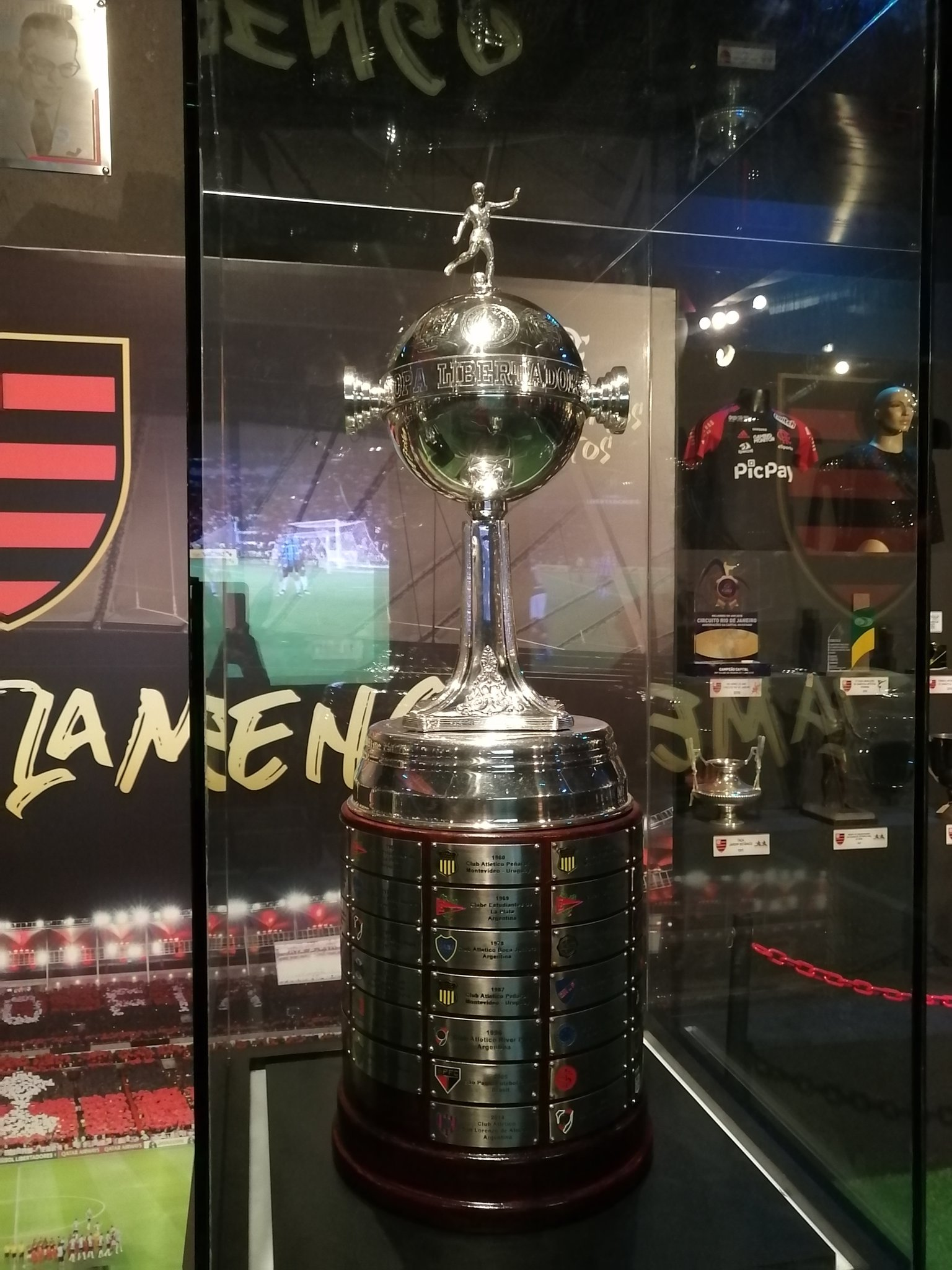
The 2019 Copa Libertadores trophy.

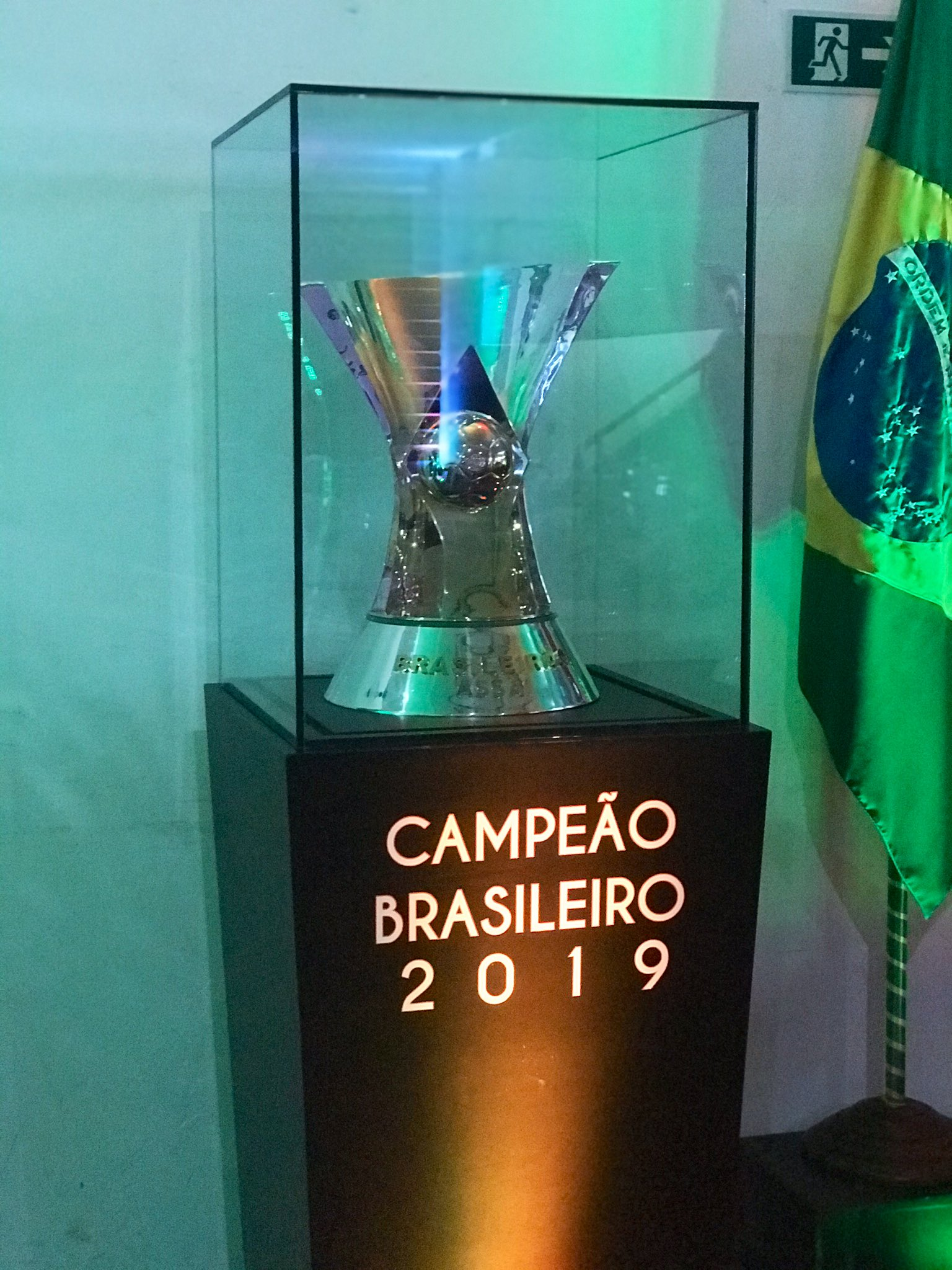
Campeonato Brasileiro Série A trophy.

=== Worldwide ===
- Intercontinental Cup: 1
  - 1981
- FIFA Challenger Cup: 1
  - 2025
- FIFA Derby of the Americas: 1
  - 2025

=== Continental ===
- Copa Libertadores: 4
  - 1981, 2019, 2022, 2025
- Copa Mercosul: 1 (record)
  - 1999
- Copa de Oro: 1 (record)
  - 1996
- Recopa Sudamericana: 1
  - 2020

=== National ===
==== League ====
- Campeonato Brasileiro Série A: 8 (Note: In 2011 the CBF ruled that Flamengo's 1987 Copa União is not officially recognized as a Brazilian national championship and Sport Recife are the sole champions of 1987.)
  - 1980, 1982, 1983, 1992, 2009, 2019, 2020, 2025
- Copa União: 1 (record)
  - 1987

==== Cups ====
- Copa do Brasil: 5
  - 1990, 2006, 2013, 2022, 2024
- Supercopa do Brasil: 3 (record)
  - 2020, 2021, 2025
- Copa dos Campeões: 1 (record)
  - 2001

=== Inter-state ===
- Torneio Rio-São Paulo: 1
  - 1961

=== State ===
- Campeonato Carioca: 40 (record)
  - 1914, 1915, 1920, 1921, 1925, 1927, 1939, 1942, 1943, 1944, 1953, 1954, 1955, 1963, 1965, 1972, 1974, 1978, 1979 (C), 1979 (S), 1981, 1986, 1991, 1996, 1999, 2000, 2001, 2004, 2007, 2008, 2009, 2011, 2014, 2017, 2019, 2020, 2021, 2024, 2025, 2026
- Copa Rio: 1
  - 1991

=== Women's ===
==== National ====
- Campeonato Brasileiro de Futebol Feminino Série A1: 1
  - 2016

==== State ====
- Campeonato Carioca de Futebol Feminino: 9
  - 2015, 2016, 2017, 2018, 2019, 2021, 2023, 2024, 2025
- Copa Rio de Futebol Feminino: 2
  - 2023, 2025

== Players records ==
=== Appearances ===
- Youngest player: Lorran – 16 years, 192 days (against Audax Rio, Campeonato Carioca, 12 January 2023)
- Youngest first-team player: Lorran – 16 years, 204 days (against Bangu, Campeonato Carioca, 24 January 2023)
- Oldest first-team player:^{a} David Luiz – 37 years, 161 days (against Athletico Paranaense, Campeonato Brasileiro Série A, 30 September 2024)

^{a} Since 2019.

==== All-time records ====
- All matches, including friendlies and non-official matches.
- Players in **bold** currently still play for the club.
- Players in italic currently still play professional football.

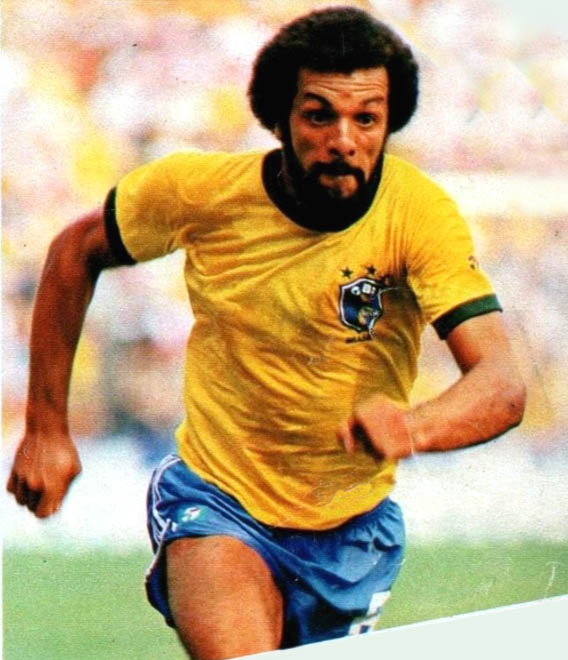
Júnior, Flamengo's all-time leader in appearances.

As of 8 December 2024

**Rank**	**Nat.**	**Player**	**Years**	**League**	**Cup**	**Continental**	**Carioca**	**Other**	**Total Matches**
1	(Brazil)	Júnior	1974–1984; 1989–1993	265	16	60	320	193	854
2	(Brazil)	Zico	1971–1983; 1985–1989	249	7	21	298	155	731
3	(Brazil)	Adílio	1978–1987	181	–	–	–	–	611
4	(Brazil)	Jordan	1952–1963	–	–	–	–	–	589
5	(Brazil)	Andrade	1979–1987	160	–	–	–	–	569
6	(Brazil)	Cantarele	1973–1989	–	–	–	–	–	557
7	(Brazil)	Carlinhos	1958–1969	–	–	–	–	–	517
8	(Brazil)	Liminha	1968–1975	–	–	–	–	–	513
9	(Brazil)	Leonardo Moura	2005–2015	314	34	38	116	5	507
10	(Brazil)	Jadir	1952–1962	–	–	–	–	–	498

==== Foreign players all-time records ====
- All matches, including friendlies and non-official matches.
- Players in **bold** currently still play for the club.
- Players in italic currently still play professional football.
- ^{†} Includes other official competitions and friendlies.
- ^{1} Includes only official matches.

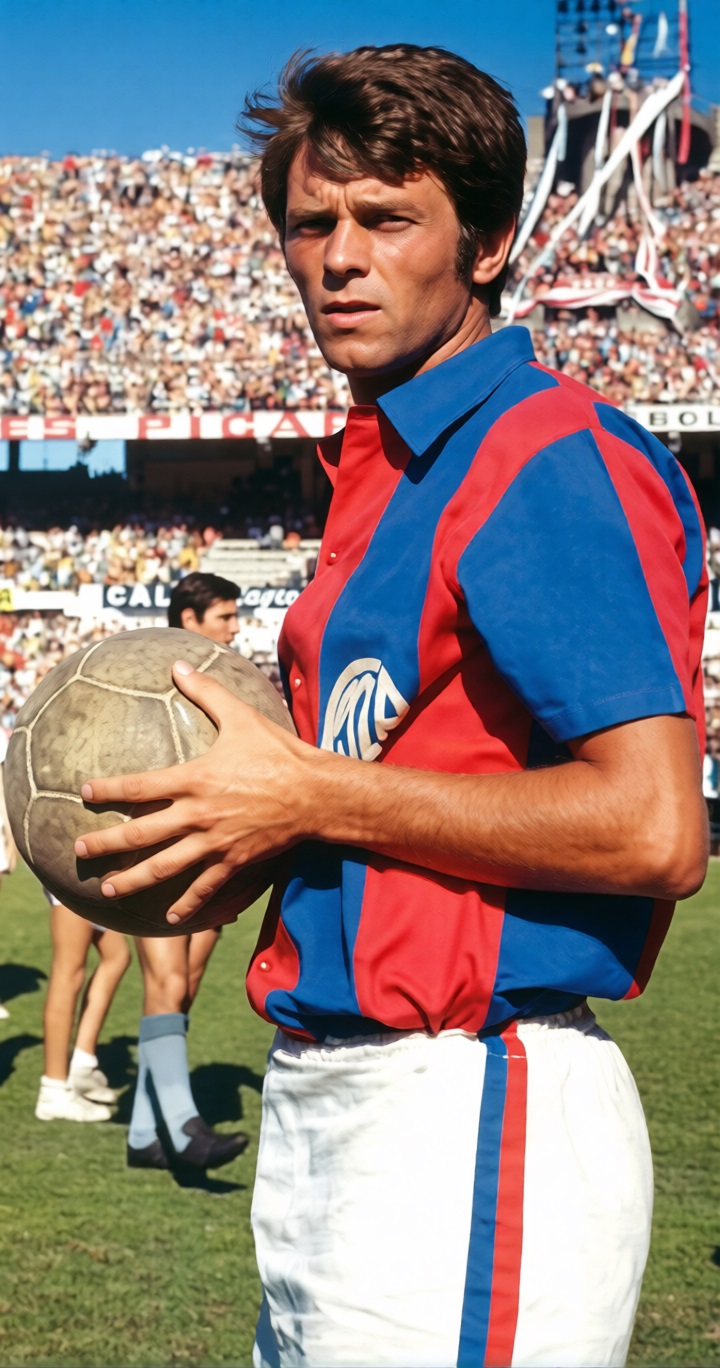
Horacio Doval, club's fourth all-time in appearances among foreign players.

As of 4 November 2026

**Rank**	**Nat.**	**Player**	**Years**	**League**	**Cup**	**Continental**	**Carioca**	**Other**^{†}	**Total Matches**
1	(Uruguay)	**Giorgian de Arrascaeta**^{1}	2019–	189	34	72	75	23	393
2	(Paraguay)	Modesto Bria	1943–1953	–	–	–	–	–	369
3	(Paraguay)	Sinforiano Garcia	1949–1958	–	–	–	–	–	276
4	(Argentina)	Horácio Doval	1969–1975	83	–	–	117	62	262
5	(Serbia)	Dejan Petković^{1}	2000–2002; 2009–2011	98	11	31	38	4	198
6	(Argentina)	**Agustín Rossi**^{1}	2023–	121	9	34	22	11	197
6	(Paraguay)	Francisco Reyes	1967–1973	–	–	–	–	–	196
8	(Chile)	**Erick Pulgar**^{1}	2022–	95	13	26	31	13	177
9	(Colombia)	Gustavo Cuéllar^{1}	2016–2019	78	20	30	35	4	167
10	(Argentina)	Carlos Volante	1938–1943	–	–	–	–	–	164
11	(Uruguay)	**Guillermo Varela**^{1}	2022–	74	15	28	30	13	160
12	(Argentina)	Agustín Valido	1937–1944	–	–	–	–	–	143
13	(England)	Sidney Pullen	1915–1925	–	–	–	–	–	130
14	(Paraguay)	Jorge Benítez	1952–1956	–	–	–	–	–	115
15	(Peru)	Paolo Guerrero^{1}	2015–2018	61	13	11	24	4	113

==== Brazilian League appearance records ====
- Includes only matches for the Brazilian National League, created only in 1971.
- Players in **bold** currently still play for the club.
- Players in italic currently still play professional football.

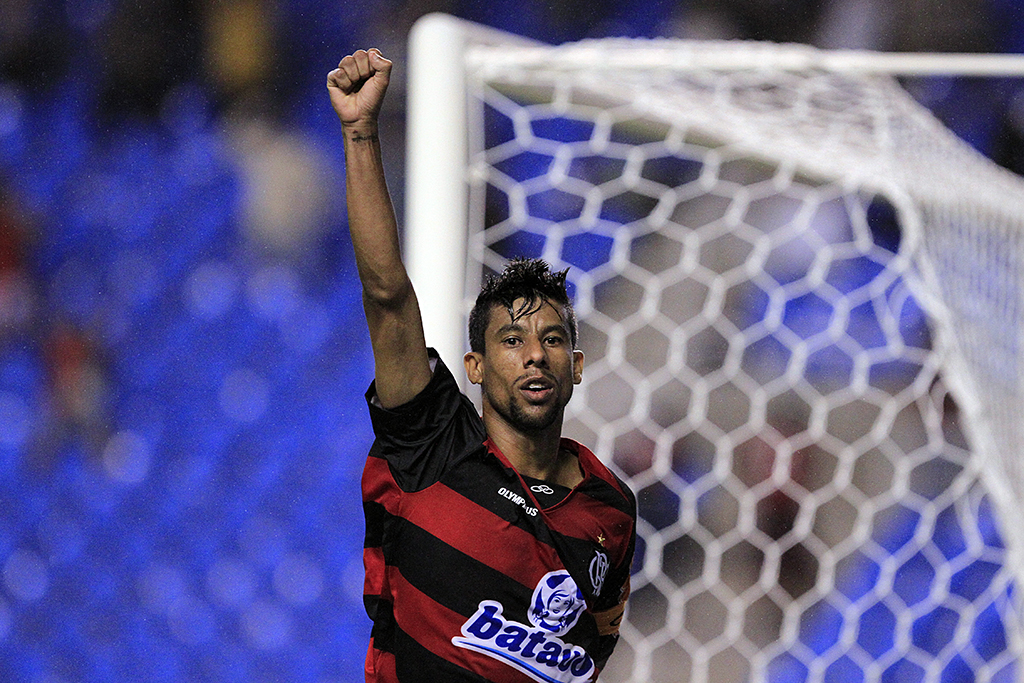
Léo Moura, the all-time leader in league match appearances.

As of 4 November 2026

**Rank**	**Nat.**	**Player**	**Years**	**Matches played**
1	(Brazil)	Leonardo Moura	2005–2015	314
2	(Brazil)	Júnior	1974–1984; 1989–1993	265
3	(Brazil)	Zico	1971–1983; 1985–1989	249
4	(Brazil)	**Bruno Henrique**	2019–	213
5	(Brazil)	Éverton Ribeiro	2017–2023	211
6	(Brazil)	Willian Arão	2016–2022	201
7	(Brazil)	**Pedro**	2020–	192
7	(Uruguay)	**Giorgian de Arrascaeta**	2019–	189
9	(Brazil)	Adílio	1978–1987	181
10	(Brazil)	Ronaldo Angelim	2006–2011	171

==== Foreign players Brazilian League appearance records ====
- Includes only matches for the Brazilian National League, created only in 1971.
- Players in **bold** currently still play for the club.
- Players in italic currently still play professional football.

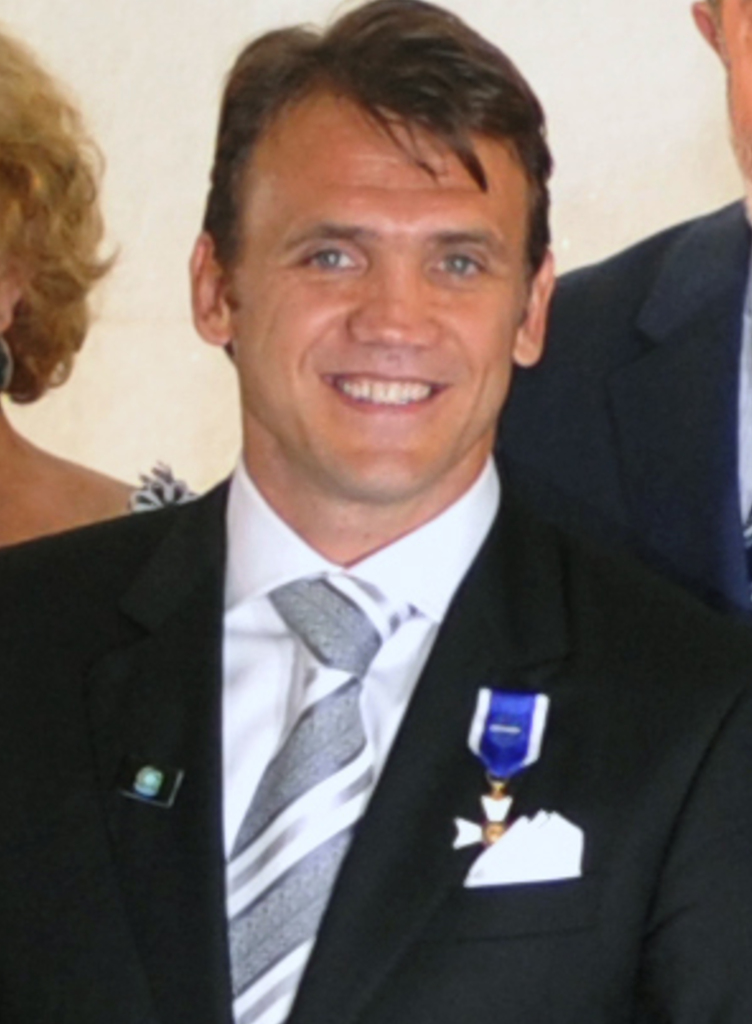
Dejan Petković is the club's second all-time in appearances among foreign players.

As of 4 November 2026

**Rank**	**Nat.**	**Player**	**Years**	**Matches played**
1	(Uruguay)	**Giorgian de Arrascaeta**	2019–	189
2	(Argentina)	**Agustín Rossi**	2023–	121
3	(Serbia)	Dejan Petković*	2000–2002; 2009–2011	98
4	(Chile)	**Erick Pulgar**	2022–	95
5	(Argentina)	Horacio Doval	1969–1975	84
6	(Colombia)	Gustavo Cuéllar	2016–2019	78
7	(Uruguay)	**Guillermo Varela**	2022–	74
8	(Peru)	Paolo Guerrero	2015–2018	61
9	(Ecuador)	**Gonzalo Plata**	2024–	60
9	(Argentina)	Héctor Canteros	2014–2018	60
11	(Chile)	Mauricio Isla	2020–2022	50
12	(Paraguay)	Víctor Cáceres	2012–2015	48
13	(Uruguay)	**Nicolás de la Cruz**	2024–	47
13	(Chile)	Gonzalo Fierro	2008–2011	47
13	(Argentina)	Darío Bottinelli	2011–2012	47
16	(Qatar)	Emerson*	2009; 2015–2016	46
17	(Italy)	**Jorginho***	2025–	45
17	(Argentina)	Maxi Biancucchi	2007–2009	45
19	(Colombia)	Orlando Berrío	2017–2020	44
19	(Chile)	Marcos Gonzalez	2012–2014	44
21	(Colombia)	**Jorge Carrascal**	2025–	43
22	(Paraguay)	Robert Piris Da Motta	2018–2021	42
23	(Chile)	Claudio Maldonado	2009–2012	39
23	(Paraguay)	Francisco Reyes	1967–1973	39
25	(Poland)	Roger Guerreiro*	2004	36
26	(Argentina)	Ubaldo Fillol	1984–1985	34
26	(Peru)	Miguel Trauco	2017–2019	34
28	(Uruguay)	Sergio Ramírez	1977–1979	32
29	(Argentina)	Federico Mancuello	2016–2017	29
30	(Spain)	**Saúl Ñíguez**	2025–	28
31	(Croatia)	Eduardo da Silva*	2014–2015	27
32	(Argentina)	Lucas Mugni	2014–2016	26
33	(Spain)	Pablo Marí	2019–2020	22
34	(Colombia)	Marlos Moreno	2018	21
34	(Chile)	Arturo Vidal	2022–2023	21
36	(Colombia)	Fernando Uribe	2018–2019	20
37	(Portugal)	Liédson*	2002–2003; 2012–2013	17
37	(Uruguay)	Matías Viña	2024–2025	17
39	(Bolivia)	Marcelo Moreno*	2013–2014	16
39	(Paraguay)	César Ramírez	2005–2006	16
41	(Argentina)	Carlos Alcaraz	2024–2025	14
42	(Argentina)	Alejandro Mancuso	1996–1997	13
43	(Uruguay)	Darío Pereyra	1988	11
43	(Ecuador)	Wagner Rivera	1996	11
45	(Poland)	Mariusz Piekarski	1997	10
46	(Uruguay)	Horacio Peralta	2006	7
46	(Argentina)	Rubens Sambueza	2008	7
46	(Colombia)	Cristian Martínez Borja	2010	7
49	(Argentina)	**Joaquín Freitas**	2026–	5
50	(Argentina)	Claudio Borghi	1989	4
50	(Paraguay)	Carlos Gamarra	2000–2002	4
50	(Colombia)	Pablo Armero	2015	4
53	(Argentina)	Hugo Colace	2007–2008	3
53	(Ecuador)	Frickson Erazo	2014	3
55	(Argentina)	Jorge Paolino	1976–1977	2
55	(Argentina)	Darío Conca	2017	2
55	(Argentina)	Alejandro Donatti	2016–2017	2
58	(Colombia)	Richard Ríos	2020–2022	1
58	(Nigeria)	Shola Ogundana	2024–2025	1
58	(Ecuador)	**Anthony Valencia**	2026–	1

* Dual or multiple citizenship.

=== Goalscorers ===
- Youngest goalscorer: Lorran – 16 years, 204 days (against Bangu, Campeonato Carioca, 24 January 2023)
- Oldest goalscorer:^{b} David Luiz – 37 years, 198 days (against Cruzeiro, Campeonato Brasileiro Série A, 6 November 2024)
- Most goals in a season in all competitions:^{a} **43** – Gabriel Barbosa, 2019
- Most League goals: **135** – Zico
- Most League goals in a season: **25** – Gabriel Barbosa, 2019
- Most League goals in a 38-game season: **25** – Gabriel Barbosa, 2019
- Most goals scored in a match:^{b} **4**
  - Pedro vs Deportes Tolima, Copa Libertadores, 6 July 2022
  - Pedro vs Maringá, Copa do Brasil, 26 April 2023
  - Pedro vs Madureira, Campeonato Carioca, 2 March 2026
- Goals in consecutive League matches:^{b} **7** consecutive matches – Gabriel Barbosa, 17 August 2019 to 25 September 2019
- Fastest goal:^{c} **15 seconds** – Pedro vs Estudiantes de La Plata, Copa Libertadores, 18 September 2025
- Most hat-tricks:^{b} **7** – Pedro

^{a} Since 2003.
^{b} Since 2019.
^{c} Since 2018.

==== All-time goal records ====
- All goals, including friendlies and non-official matches.
- Players in **bold** currently still play for the club.
- Players in italic currently still play professional football.

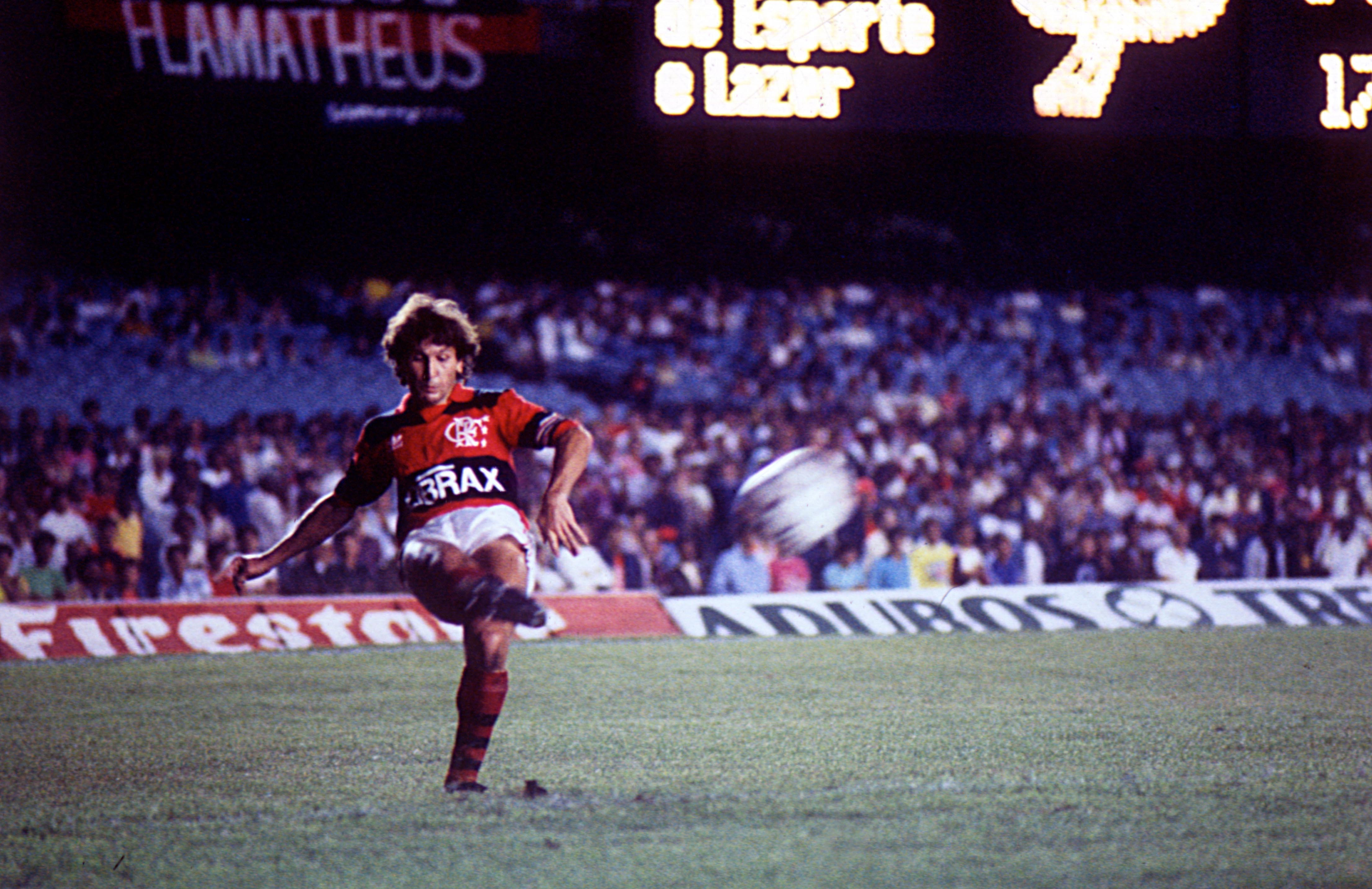
Zico, Flamengo's all-time leading scorer

As of 4 November 2026

**Rank**	**Nat.**	**Player**	**Years**	**Goals scored**
1	(Brazil)	Zico	1971–1983; 1985–1989	508
2	(Brazil)	Dida	1954–1963	244
3	(Brazil)	Henrique Frade	1954–1963	213
4	(Brazil)	Romário	1995–1996; 1998–1999	204
5	(Brazil)	Pirilo	1941–1947	201
6	(Brazil)	**Pedro**^{1}	2020–	179
7	(Brazil)	Gabriel Barbosa^{1}	2019–2024	161
8	(Brazil)	Jarbas	1933–1946	152
9	(Brazil)	Bebeto	1983–1989; 1996	150
10	(Brazil)	Leônidas da Silva	1936–1942	147

- ^{1} Includes only official matches.

==== Foreign players all-time goal records ====
- All goals, including friendlies and non-official matches.
- Players in **bold** currently still play for the club.
- Players in italic currently still play professional football.

As of 26 October 2026

**Rank**	**Nat.**	**Player**	**Years**	**Goals scored**
1	(Uruguay)	**Giorgian de Arrascaeta**^{1}	2019–	108
2	(Argentina)	Horácio Doval	1969–1975	94
3	(Paraguay)	Jorge Benítez	1952–1956	76
4	(Serbia)	Dejan Petković^{1}	2000–2002; 2009–2011	57
5	(England)	Sidney Pullen	1915–1925	49
6	(Argentina)	Agustín Valido	1937–1944	45
7	(Peru)	Paolo Guerrero^{1}	2015–2018	43
8	(Argentina)	Alfredo González	1940	31
9	(Germany)	Fritz Engel	1936–1938	23
10	(Qatar)	Emerson^{1}	2009; 2015–2016	21

- ^{1} Includes only official matches.

==== Brazilian League goal records ====
- Includes only matches and goals for the Brazilian National League, created only in 1971.
- Players in bold currently still play for the club.
- Players in italic currently still play professional football.

As of 4 November 2026

**Rank**	**Nat.**	**Player**	**Years**	**Goals scored**
1	(Brazil)	Zico	1971–1983; 1985–1989	135
2	(Brazil)	**Pedro**	2020–	87
3	(Brazil)	Gabriel Barbosa	2019–2024	71
4	(Brazil)	**Bruno Henrique**	2019–	60
5	(Uruguay)	**Giorgian de Arrascaeta**	2019–	59
6	(Brazil)	Bebeto	1983–1989; 1996	41
7	(Brazil)	Renato Abreu	2005–2007; 2010–2013	39
8	(Brazil)	Romário	1995–1996; 1998–1999	37
9	(Brazil)	Nunes	1973; 1980–1984; 1987; 1990	34
10	(Serbia)	Dejan Petković	2000–2002; 2009–2011	31

==== Foreign players Brazilian League goal records ====
- Includes only goals for the Brazilian National League, created only in 1971.
- Players in **bold** currently still play for the club.
- Players in italic currently still play professional football.

As of 26 October 2026

**Rank**	**Nat.**	**Player**	**Years**	**Goals scored**
1	(Uruguay)	**Giorgian de Arrascaeta**	2019–	59
2	(Serbia)	Dejan Petković*	2000–2002; 2009–2011	31
3	(Peru)	Paolo Guerrero	2015–2018	19
4	(Argentina)	Horacio Doval	1969–1975	14
5	(Qatar)	Emerson*	2009; 2015–2016	12
6	(Croatia)	Eduardo da Silva*	2014–2015	10
7	(Colombia)	**Jorge Carrascal**	2025–	9
7	(Ecuador)	**Gonzalo Plata**	2024–	9
9	(Colombia)	Fernando Uribe	2018–2019	6
9	(Argentina)	Darío Bottinelli	2011–2012	6
9	(Italy)	**Jorginho**	2025–	6

* Dual or multiple citizenship.

=== Goalkeepers ===
- Most all-time clean sheets: **90** – Agustín Rossi
- Most all-time League clean sheets: **46** – Agustín Rossi
- Most clean sheets in a season in all competitions:^{a} **36** – Agustín Rossi, 2025
- Most League clean sheets in a season:^{a} **18** – Agustín Rossi, 2025
- Most League clean sheets in a 38-game season:^{a} **18** – Agustín Rossi, 2025
- Most clean sheets in a row in all competitions: **11** – Agustín Rossi, 31 January 2024 to 30 March 2024

^{a} Since 2017.

=== Award winners ===
Club player of the Year

The following players have won the Flamengo Player of the Year award given by the club after public voting:

- (Brazil) Diego – 2016

South American Footballer of the Year

The following players have won the South American Footballer of the Year award while playing for Flamengo:

- (Brazil) Zico – 1977, 1981, 1982
- (Brazil) Gabriel Barbosa – 2019
- (Brazil) Pedro – 2022
- (Uruguay) Giorgian de Arrascaeta – 2025

=== Internationals ===
FIFA World Cup

The following players have won the FIFA World Cup while playing for Flamengo:

- (Brazil) Mário Zagallo – 1958
- (Brazil) Moacir – 1958
- (Brazil) Joel – 1958
- (Brazil) Dida – 1958
- (Brazil) Brito – 1970
- (Brazil) Gilmar Rinaldi – 1994
- (Brazil) Juninho Paulista – 2002

Copa América

The following players have won the Copa América while playing for Flamengo:

- (Brazil) Carregal – 1919
- (Brazil) Galo – 1919
- (Brazil) Píndaro – 1919
- (Brazil) Kuntz – 1922
- (Brazil) Junqueira – 1922
- (Brazil) Jair da Rosa Pinto – 1949
- (Brazil) Zizinho – 1949
- (Brazil) Zé Carlos – 1989
- (Brazil) Bebeto – 1989
- (Brazil) Romário – 1997
- (Brazil) Beto – 1999
- (Brazil) Zé Roberto – 1999
- (Brazil) Júlio César – 2004
- (Brazil) Felipe – 2004

== Managerial records ==
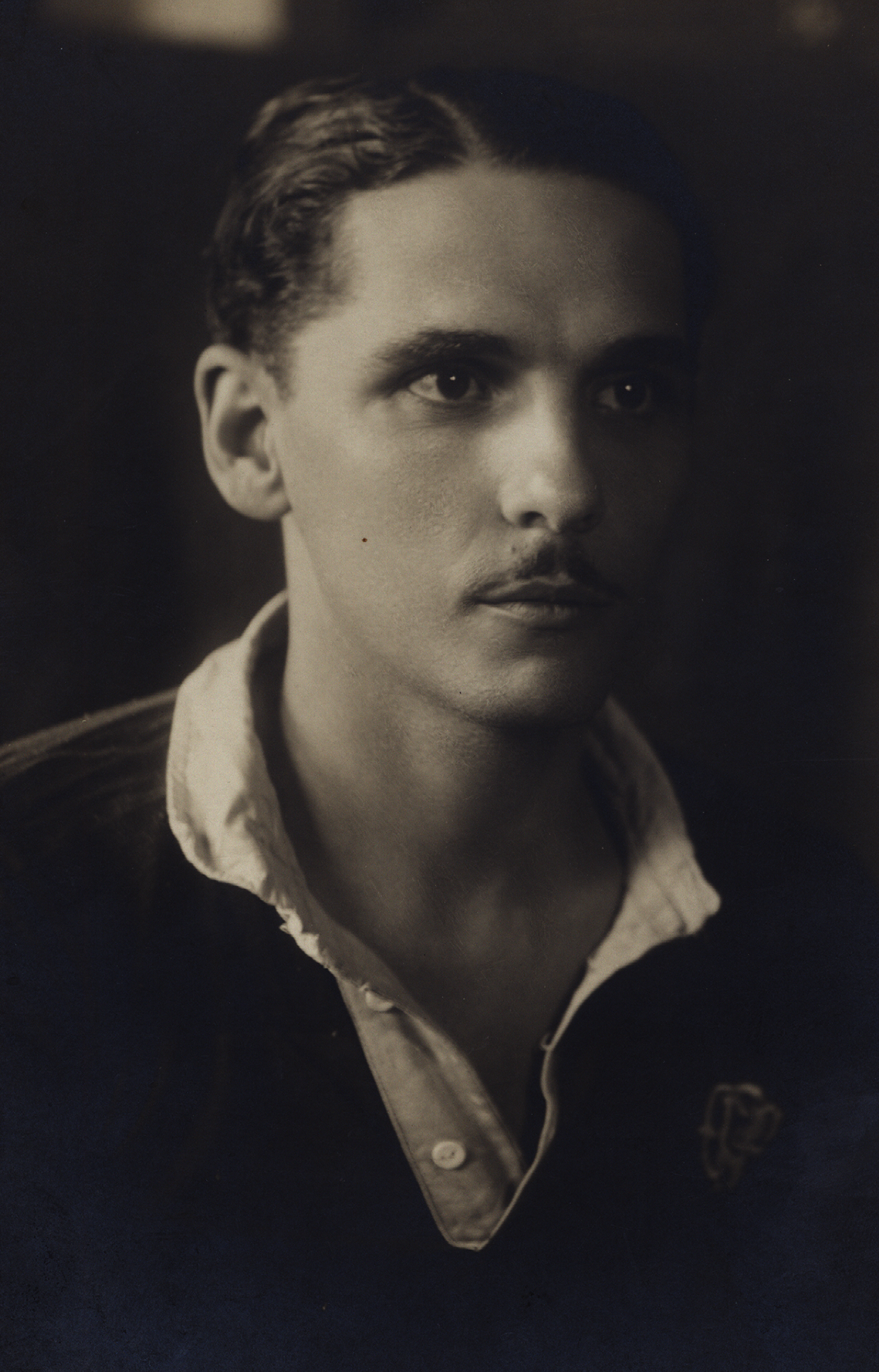
Flávio Costa was the manager of Flamengo for 293 matches during the period between 1938 and 1945.

- First full-time manager: Ramón Platero – Platero was manager of Flamengo for less than a year in 1921 with a total of eight matches.
- Longest-serving manager: Flávio Costa – 7 years (293 matches; from 1938 to 1945).
- Highest winning percentage:^{a} Jorge Jesus – 75,44%

^{a} Minimum of twenty official matches.

== Transfers records ==
=== Highest transfer fees paid ===
- Players in **bold** currently still play for the club.
- The list is ordered by the amount of R$ paid.

	**Player**	**From**	Fee (R$)	Fee (US$)	**Fee (€)**	**Date**	**Ref**
1	(Brazil) **Lucas Paquetá**	(England) West Ham United	R$262.1 million	US$49.8 million	€42.0 million	January 2026	
2	(Brazil) **Samuel Lino**	(Spain) Atlético Madrid	R$141.8 million	US$25.4 million	€22.0 million	July 2025	
3	(Argentina) Carlos Alcaraz	(England) Southampton	R$110.8 million	US$20.0 million	€18.0 million	August 2024	
4	(Brazil) **Pedro**	(Italy) ACF Fiorentina	R$87.0 million	US$16.8 million	€14.0 million	December 2020	
5	(Brazil) Gerson	(France) Olympique de Marseille	R$85.1 million	US$16.1 million	€15.0 million	January 2023	
6	(Brazil) Gabriel Barbosa	(Italy) Inter Milan	R$78.6 million	US$18.8 million	€17.0 million	January 2020	
7	(Uruguay) **Nicolás de la Cruz**	(Argentina) River Plate	R$78.1 million	US$16.0 million	€14.5 million	December 2023	
8	(Colombia) **Jorge Carrascal**	(Russia) Dynamo Moscow	R$77.1 million	US$13.9 million	€12.0 million	August 2025	
9	(Brazil) Everton Soares	(Portugal) Benfica	R$73.8 million	US$14.2 million	€13.5 million	June 2022	
10	(Brazil) **Vitão**	(Brazil) Internacional	R$66.9 million	US$12.1 million	€10.2 million	January 2026	
11	(Uruguay) **Giorgian de Arrascaeta**	(Brazil) Cruzeiro	R$63.7 million	US$17.3 million	€15.0 million	January 2019	
12	(Brazil) Gerson	(Italy) AS Roma	R$49.7 million	US$13.3 million	€11.8 million	July 2019	
13	(Brazil) **Luiz Araújo**	(United States) Atlanta United	R$48.7 million	US$9.7 million	€9.0 million	July 2023	
14	(Uruguay) **Matías Viña**	(Italy) AS Roma	R$48.3 million	US$9.7 million	€9.0 million	January 2024	
15	(Brazil) Vitinho	(Russia) CSKA Moscow	R$44.0 million	US$12.8 million	€10.0 million	July 2018	
16	(Brazil) Allan	(Brazil) Atlético Mineiro	R$42.8 million	US$9.0 million	€8.2 million	July 2023	
17	(Brazil) **Ayrton Lucas**	(Russia) Spartak Moscow	R$39.6 million	US$8.3 million	€7.0 million	January 2023	
18	(Brazil) **Léo Ortiz**	(Brazil) Red Bull Bragantino	R$37.6 million	US$7.6 million	€7.0 million	March 2024	
19	(Argentina) **Joaquín Freitas**	(Argentina) River Plate	R$37.6 million	US$7.0 million	€6.0 million	September 2026	
20	(Brazil) Michael	(Brazil) Goiás	R$35.9 million	US$8.3 million	€7.5 million	January 2020	

=== Highest transfer fees received ===
- The list is ordered by the amount of R$ received.

	**Player**	**To**	Fee (R$)	Fee (US$)	**Fee (€)**	**Date**	**Ref**
1	(Brazil) Vinícius Júnior	(Spain) Real Madrid	R$164.0 million	US$53.4 million	€45.0 million	July 2018	
2	(Brazil) Wesley França	(Italy) AS Roma	R$163.4 million	US$29.4 million	€25.0 million	July 2025	
3	(Brazil) Gerson	(Russia) Zenit Saint Petersburg	R$160.8 million	US$29.4 million	€25.0 million	July 2025	
4	(Brazil) Gerson	(France) Olympique de Marseille	R$154.2 million	US$30.4 million	€25.0 million	July 2021	
5	(Brazil) Lucas Paquetá	(Italy) AC Milan	R$150.0 million	US$40.3 million	€35.0 million	January 2019	
6	(Brazil) Reinier	(Spain) Real Madrid	R$136.0 million	US$33.0 million	€30.0 million	January 2020	
7	(Brazil) Matheus França	(England) Crystal Palace	R$104.4 million	US$22.0 million	€20.0 million	July 2023	
8	(Brazil) João Gomes	(England) Wolverhampton Wanderers	R$103.2 million	US$20.3 million	€18.7 million	January 2023	
9	(Argentina) Carlos Alcaraz	(England) Everton	R$97.8 million	US$17.7 million	€15.0 million	July 2025	
10	(Spain) Pablo Marí	(England) Arsenal	R$95.0 million	US$18.5 million	€16.0 million	July 2020	
11	(Brazil) Rodrigo Muniz	(England) Fulham	R$49.5 million	US$9.4 million	€8.0 million	August 2021	
12	(Brazil) Michael	(Saudi Arabia) Al Hilal	R$45.5 million	US$8.5 million	€7.6 million	January 2022	
13	(Brazil) Léo Duarte	(Italy) AC Milan	R$42.2 million	US$11.1 million	€10.0 million	July 2019	
14	(Brazil) Lázaro	(Spain) Almería	R$36.4 million	US$7.0 million	€7.0 million	September 2022	
15	(Brazil) Wallace Yan	(Brazil) Red Bull Bragantino	R$36.1 million	US$7.0 million	€6.0 million	August 2026	
16	(Brazil) Jean Lucas	(France) Lyon	R$34.7 million	US$9.0 million	€8.0 million	June 2019	
17	(Colombia) Gustavo Cuéllar	(Saudi Arabia) Al Hilal	R$34.2 million	US$8.2 million	€7.5 million	August 2019	
18	(Brazil) Juninho	(Mexico) Pumas UNAM	R$32.3 million	US$5.9 million	€5.0 million	January 2026	
19	(Brazil) Yuri César	(United Arab Emirates) Shabab Al Ahli	R$31.0 million	US$6.0 million	€4.9 million	January 2021	
20	(Brazil) Jorge	(France) Monaco	R$30.4 million	US$9.6 million	€9.0 million	January 2017	

== Team records ==
=== National league records ===
==== Old league format (1971–2002) ====
Season	Div.	Pos	Pld	W	D	L	GF	GA	Pts	Cup	CONMEBOL		Rnk	Top scorer (League)	Goals	Head coach
1971	Campeonato Nacional de Clubes	14	19	4	10	5	13	17	18	Not held	DNP	DNP		N/A	N/A	(Brazil) Yustrich (Paraguay) Fleitas Solich
1972	Campeonato Nacional de Clubes	12	28	10	10	8	24	25	30	Not held	DNP	DNP		N/A	N/A	(Brazil) Mário Zagallo (Brazil) Joubert (Brazil) Mário Zagallo
1973	Campeonato Nacional de Clubes	24	28	11	4	13	31	34	26	Not held	DNP	DNP		N/A	N/A	(Brazil) Joubert (Brazil) Mário Zagallo (Brazil) Joubert
1974	Campeonato Nacional de Clubes	6	24	14	6	4	41	15	34	Not held	DNP	DNP		N/A	N/A	(Brazil) Joubert (Brazil) Carlos Froner
1975	Copa Brasil	7	28	13	5	10	34	28	38	Not held	DNP	DNP		N/A	N/A	(Brazil) Carlos Froner
1976	Copa Brasil	5	21	14	3	4	48	15	41	Not held	DNP	DNP		N/A	N/A	(Brazil) Cláudio Coutinho
1977	Copa Brasil	9	19	9	6	4	31	11	24	Not held	DNP	DNP		N/A	N/A	(Brazil) Cláudio Coutinho (Brazil) Jayme Valente
1978	Copa Brasil	16	26	13	7	6	33	23	33	Not held	DNP	DNP		N/A	N/A	(Brazil) Jayme Valente (Brazil) Joubert (Brazil) Cláudio Coutinho
1979	Copa Brasil	12	10	7	2	1	21	6	16	Not held	DNP	DNP		N/A	N/A	(Brazil) Cláudio Coutinho
1980	Taça de Ouro	1	22	14	6	2	46	20	34	Not held	DNP	DNP		(Brazil) Zico	21	(Brazil) Cláudio Coutinho
1981	Taça de Ouro	6	19	9	7	3	30	19	25	Not held	CL	Champion		(Brazil) Nunes	16	(Paraguay) Modesto Bria (Brazil) Dino Sani (Brazil) Paulo César Carpegiani
1982	Taça de Ouro	1	23	15	6	2	48	27	36	Not held	CL	Semifinals		(Brazil) Zico	21	(Brazil) Paulo César Carpegiani
1983	Taça de Ouro	1	26	14	7	5	57	30	35	Not held	CL	Group stage		N/A	N/A	(Brazil) Paulo César Carpegiani (Brazil) Carlinhos (Brazil) Carlos Alberto Torres (Brazil) Cláudio Garcia
1984	Copa Brasil	5	22	11	7	4	32	20	29	Not held	CL	Semifinals		N/A	N/A	(Brazil) Cláudio Garcia (Brazil) Mário Zagallo
1985	Taça de Ouro	9	26	11	8	7	40	23	30	Not held	DNP	DNP		N/A	N/A	(Brazil) Mário Zagallo (Brazil) Joubert (Brazil) Sebastião Lazaroni
1986	Copa Brasil	13	28	12	8	8	34	19	32	Not held	DNP	DNP		N/A	N/A	(Brazil) Sebastião Lazaroni
1987	Copa União	1	19	9	6	4	22	15	24	Not held	DNP	DNP		N/A	N/A	(Brazil) Sebastião Lazaroni (Brazil) Carlinhos (Brazil) Antônio Lopes (Brazil) Carlinhos
1988	Copa Brasil	6	25	11	8	6	32	20	30	Not held	SC	Second round		N/A	N/A	(Brazil) Carlinhos (Brazil) Candinho (Brazil) Telê Santana
1989	Série A	9	18	6	7	5	16	13	19	Semifinals	SC	First round		N/A	N/A	(Brazil) Telê Santana (Brazil) Valdir Espinosa
1990	Série A	11	19	7	6	6	24	18	20	Champion	SC	First round		N/A	N/A	(Brazil) Valdir Espinosa (Brazil) Jair Pereira
1991	Série A	9	19	7	5	7	20	24	19	DNP	SC	Quarterfinals		N/A	N/A	(Brazil) Vanderlei Luxemburgo (Brazil) Carlinhos
1991	Série A	9	19	7	5	7	20	24	19	DNP	CL	Quarterfinals		N/A	N/A	(Brazil) Vanderlei Luxemburgo (Brazil) Carlinhos
1992	Série A	1	27	12	8	7	44	31	32	DNP	SC	Semifinals		N/A	N/A	(Brazil) Carlinhos
1993	Série A	8	20	6	8	6	23	24	20	Semifinals	SC	Runner-up		N/A	N/A	(Brazil) Carlinhos (Brazil) Jair Pereira (Brazil) Evaristo de Macedo (Brazil) Júnior
1993	Série A	8	20	6	8	6	23	24	20	Semifinals	CL	Quarterfinals		N/A	N/A	(Brazil) Carlinhos (Brazil) Jair Pereira (Brazil) Evaristo de Macedo (Brazil) Júnior
1994	Série A	14	25	7	9	9	24	27	23	DNP	SC	Round of 16		N/A	N/A	(Brazil) Júnior (Brazil) Carlinhos (Brazil) Edinho
1995	Série A	21	23	5	9	9	23	32	24	Semifinals	SC	Runner-up		N/A	N/A	(Brazil) Vanderlei Luxemburgo (Brazil) Edinho (Brazil) Washington Rodrigues
1996	Série A	13	23	9	3	11	24	31	30	Semifinals	SC	Quarterfinals		N/A	N/A	(Brazil) Joel Santana
1996	Série A	13	23	9	3	11	24	31	30	Semifinals	CdO	Champion		N/A	N/A	(Brazil) Joel Santana
1997	Série A	5	31	14	8	9	37	32	36	Runner-up	SC	Group stage		N/A	N/A	(Brazil) Júnior (Brazil) Sebastião Rocha
1998	Série A	11	23	9	6	8	37	34	33	Round of 16	CM	Group stage		N/A	N/A	(Brazil) Joel Santana (Brazil) Evaristo de Macedo
1999	Série A	12	21	9	2	10	30	33	29	Quarterfinals	CM	Champion		N/A	N/A	(Brazil) Evaristo de Macedo (Brazil) Carlinhos
2000	Copa João Havelange	15	24	9	6	9	42	37	33	Quarterfinals	CM	Quarterfinals		N/A	N/A	(Brazil) Paulo César Carpegiani (Brazil) Carlinhos (Brazil) Mário Zagallo
2001	Série A	24	27	8	5	14	25	38	29	Quarterfinals	CM	Runner-up		N/A	N/A	(Brazil) Mário Zagallo (Brazil) Carlos Alberto Torres
2002	Série A	18	25	8	6	11	38	39	30	DNP	CL	Group stage		N/A	N/A	(Brazil) Carlos Alberto Torres (Brazil) João Carlos da Silva Costa (Brazil) Lula Pereira (Brazil) Evaristo de Macedo
Total			738	317	204	217	1018	790	912							

==== Current national league format ====
Season	Div.	Pos	Pld	W	D	L	GF	GA	Pts	Cup	CONMEBOL		Rnk	Top scorer (League)	Goals	Head coach
2003	Série A	8	46	18	12	16	66	73	66	Runner-up	CS	Preliminary round		(Brazil) Edílson	13	(Brazil) Evaristo de Macedo (Brazil) Nelsinho Baptista (Brazil) Oswaldo de Oliveira (Brazil) Waldemar Lemos
2004	Série A	15	46	13	15	18	51	53	54	Runner-up	CS	Preliminary round		(Brazil) Dimba	7	(Brazil) Abel Braga (Brazil) P.C. Gusmão (Brazil) Ricardo Gomes
2005	Série A	15	42	14	13	15	56	60	55	Round of 16	DNP	DNP		(Brazil) Renato Abreu	12	(Brazil) Júlio César Leal (Brazil) Cuca (Brazil) Celso Roth (Brazil) Joel Santana
2006	Série A	11	38	15	7	16	44	48	52	Champion	DNP	DNP		(Brazil) Obina	11	(Brazil) Valdir Espinosa (Brazil) Waldemar Lemos (Brazil) Ney Franco
2007	Série A	3	38	17	10	11	55	49	61	DNP	CL	Round of 16		(Brazil) Ibson (Brazil) Souza (Brazil) Juan	6	(Brazil) Ney Franco (Brazil) Joel Santana
2008	Série A	5	38	18	10	10	67	48	64	DNP	CL	Round of 16		(Brazil) Ibson	11	(Brazil) Joel Santana (Brazil) Caio Júnior
2009	Série A	1	38	19	10	9	58	44	67	Quarterfinals	CS	Preliminary round		(Brazil) Adriano	19	(Brazil) Cuca (Brazil) Andrade
2010	Série A	14	38	9	17	12	41	44	44	DNP	CL	Quarterfinals		(Serbia) Dejan Petković (Brazil) Diego Maurício	5	(Brazil) Andrade (Brazil) Rogério Lourenço (Brazil) Paulo Silas (Brazil) Vanderlei Luxemburgo
2011	Série A	4	38	15	16	7	59	47	61	Quarterfinals	CS	Round of 16		(Brazil) Deivid	15	(Brazil) Vanderlei Luxemburgo
2012	Série A	11	38	12	14	12	39	46	50	DNP	CL	Group Stage		(Brazil) Vágner Love	13	(Brazil) Vanderlei Luxemburgo (Brazil) Joel Santana (Brazil) Dorival Júnior
2013	Série A	16^{1}	38	12	13	13	43	46	49	Champion	DNP	DNP		(Brazil) Hernane	16	(Brazil) Dorival Júnior (Brazil) Jorginho (Brazil) Mano Menezes (Brazil) Jayme de Almeida
2014	Série A	10	38	14	10	14	46	47	52	Semifinals	CL	Group Stage		(Croatia) Eduardo da Silva	8	(Brazil) Jayme de Almeida (Brazil) Ney Franco (Brazil) Vanderlei Luxemburgo
2015	Série A	12	38	15	4	19	45	53	49	Round of 16	DNP	DNP		(Brazil) Alan Patrick	7	(Brazil) Vanderlei Luxemburgo (Brazil) Cristóvão Borges (Brazil) Oswaldo de Oliveira
2016	Série A	3	38	20	11	7	52	35	71	Second Round	CS	Round of 16	30th	(Peru) Paolo Guerrero	9	(Brazil) Muricy Ramalho (Brazil) Zé Ricardo
2017	Série A	6	38	15	11	12	49	38	56	Runner-up	CL	Group Stage	37th	(Brazil) Diego	10	(Brazil) Zé Ricardo (Colombia) Reinaldo Rueda
2017	Série A	6	38	15	11	12	49	38	56	Runner-up	CS	Runner-up	37th	(Brazil) Diego	10	(Brazil) Zé Ricardo (Colombia) Reinaldo Rueda
2018	Série A	2	38	21	9	8	59	29	72	Semifinals	CL	Round of 16	35th	(Brazil) Lucas Paquetá	10	(Brazil) Paulo César Carpegiani (Brazil) Mauricio Barbieri (Brazil) Dorival Júnior
2019	Série A	1	38	28	6	4	86	37	90	Quarterfinals	CL	Champion	30th	(Brazil) Gabriel Barbosa	25	(Brazil) Abel Braga (Portugal) Jorge Jesus
2020	Série A	1	38	21	8	9	68	48	71	Quarterfinals	RS	Champion	8th	(Brazil) Gabriel Barbosa	14	(Portugal) Jorge Jesus (Spain) Domènec Torrent (Brazil) Rogério Ceni
2020	Série A	1	38	21	8	9	68	48	71	Quarterfinals	CL	Round of 16	8th	(Brazil) Gabriel Barbosa	14	(Portugal) Jorge Jesus (Spain) Domènec Torrent (Brazil) Rogério Ceni
2021	Série A	2	38	21	8	9	69	36	71	Semifinals	CL	Runner-up	6th	(Brazil) Michael	14	(Brazil) Rogério Ceni (Brazil) Renato Gaúcho
2022	Série A	5	38	18	8	12	60	39	62	Champion	CL	Champion	4th	(Brazil) Gabriel Barbosa (Brazil) Pedro	11	(Portugal) Paulo Sousa (Brazil) Dorival Júnior
2023	Série A	4	38	19	9	10	56	42	66	Runner-up	RS	Runner-up	3rd	(Brazil) Pedro	13	(Portugal) Vítor Pereira (Argentina) Jorge Sampaoli (Brazil) Tite
2023	Série A	4	38	19	9	10	56	42	66	Runner-up	CL	Round of 16	3rd	(Brazil) Pedro	13	(Portugal) Vítor Pereira (Argentina) Jorge Sampaoli (Brazil) Tite
2024	Série A	3	38	20	10	8	61	42	70	Champion	CL	Quarterfinals	4th	(Brazil) Pedro	11	(Brazil) Tite (Brazil) Filipe Luís
2025	Série A	1	38	23	10	5	78	27	79	Round of 16	CL	Champion	4th	(Uruguay) Giorgian de Arrascaeta	18	(Brazil) Filipe Luís
2026	Série A	TBD	34	23	7	4	71	29	76	Fifth round	RS	Runner-up	2nd	(Brazil) Pedro	20	(Brazil) Filipe Luís (Portugal) Leonardo Jardim
2026	Série A	TBD	34	23	7	4	71	29	76	Fifth round	CL	Semifinals	2nd	(Brazil) Pedro	20	(Brazil) Filipe Luís (Portugal) Leonardo Jardim
Total			928	420	248	259	1283	1064	1508							

- ^{1} Although finishing 11th place in 2013 with 49 points, Flamengo dropped to 16th place, with 45 points, due to the loss of 4 points caused by selecting a suspended player in Round 38.

==== All-time league record ====
Statistics correct as of match played on 4 November 2026.

- Teams with this background in the "Club" column are competing in the 2026 Campeonato Brasileiro Série A alongside Flamengo.
- Clubs with this background in the "Club" column are defunct.
- Pld = matches played; W = matches won; D = matches drawn; L = matches lost; GF = Goals scored; GA = Goals conceded; Win% = percentage of total matches won

Flamengo league record by opponent
Club	Pld	W	D	L	GF	GA	GD	Win%
ABC	3	2	1	0	3	0	+3	66.67
América Mineiro	18	10	6	2	30	16	+14	55.56
América-RJ	16	9	4	3	24	15	+9	56.25
América-RN	7	5	1	1	14	5	+9	71.43
Americano	4	3	1	0	7	2	+5	75.00
Athletico Paranaense	59	21	13	25	74	81	−7	35.59
Atlético Goianiense	18	11	4	3	28	17	+11	61.11
Atlético Mineiro	78	32	17	29	100	109	−9	41.03
Avaí	15	6	5	4	28	17	+11	40.00
Bangu	4	4	0	0	11	2	+9	100.00
Bahia	54	26	16	12	87	51	+36	48.15
Botafogo	71	27	28	16	89	70	+19	38.03
Botafogo-PB	2	1	0	1	3	2	+1	50.00
Botafogo-SP	3	2	0	1	6	2	+4	66.67
Brasil de Pelotas	4	2	0	2	4	3	+1	50.00
Brasília	2	2	0	0	5	0	+5	100.00
Brasiliense	2	1	0	1	6	6	+0	50.00
Caxias	1	0	1	0	1	1	+0	0.00
Ceará	21	9	9	3	31	20	+11	42.86
Central	2	1	0	1	6	2	+4	50.00
CEUB	1	1	0	0	1	0	+1	100.00
Chapecoense	15	11	2	2	33	13	+20	73.33
Colorado	2	1	0	1	2	5	−3	50.00
Confiança	1	1	0	0	3	1	+2	100.00
Comercial	2	1	1	0	3	1	+2	50.00
Corinthians	81	34	20	27	119	98	+21	41.98
Coritiba	49	27	7	15	76	56	+20	55.10
CRB	3	3	0	0	10	4	+6	100.00
Criciúma	16	10	4	2	31	13	+18	62.50
Cruzeiro	66	26	15	25	81	70	+11	39.39
CSA	3	3	0	0	6	1	+5	100.00
Cuiabá	8	5	2	1	11	7	+4	62.50
Desportiva	5	4	0	1	11	1	+10	80.00
Fast Clube	1	1	0	0	1	0	+1	100.00
Ferroviário	1	1	0	0	3	2	+1	100.00
Flamengo-PI	3	3	0	0	7	2	+5	100.00
Fluminense	73	29	18	26	90	78	+12	39.73
Fluminense de Feira	1	1	0	0	6	0	+6	100.00
Figueirense	24	9	6	9	31	32	−1	37.50
Fortaleza	22	12	3	7	44	23	+21	54.55
Gama	5	2	1	2	9	8	+1	40.00
Goiás	52	20	23	9	80	51	+29	38.46
Goytacaz	1	1	0	0	1	0	+1	100.00
Grêmio	78	27	22	29	94	96	−2	34.62
Grêmio Barueri	4	2	1	1	6	5	+1	50.00
Grêmio Maringá	1	1	0	0	1	0	+1	100.00
Guarani	30	13	10	7	44	31	+13	43.33
Joinvile	3	3	0	0	5	1	+4	100.00
Juventude	29	12	7	10	53	35	+18	41.38
Londrina	2	0	1	1	1	2	−1	0.00
Itabaiana	3	3	0	0	8	0	+8	100.00
Inter de Limeira	2	1	0	1	3	2	+1	50.00
Internacional	76	25	23	28	91	107	−16	32.89
Ipatinga	2	2	0	0	4	1	+3	100.00
Mirassol	4	3	1	0	12	5	+7	75.00
Mixto	1	1	0	0	2	0	+2	100.00
Moto Club	2	1	1	0	5	2	+3	50.00
Nacional-AM	3	2	1	0	3	1	+2	66.67
Náutico	26	16	6	4	41	14	+27	61.54
Noroeste	1	0	0	1	0	1	−1	0.00
Olaria	3	2	1	0	3	1	+2	66.67
Operário-MS	3	1	1	1	4	4	+0	33.33
Palmeiras	74	24	27	23	98	91	+7	32.43
Paraná	20	7	2	11	22	33	−11	35.00
Paysandu	17	10	4	3	39	20	+19	58.82
Ponte Preta	26	7	11	8	22	27	−5	26.92
Portuguesa	29	10	12	7	28	30	−2	34.48
Red Bull Bragantino	25	10	7	8	30	32	−2	40.00
Remo	7	4	0	3	10	5	+5	57.14
Rio Negro	3	2	1	0	10	3	+7	66.67
Sampaio Corrêa	3	3	0	0	12	2	+10	100.00
Santa Cruz	21	8	7	6	34	25	+9	38.10
Santo André	2	2	0	0	5	1	+4	100.00
Santos	80	33	23	24	97	89	+8	41.25
São Bento	1	1	0	0	4	0	+4	100.00
São Caetano	10	5	3	2	14	8	+6	50.00
São José	1	1	0	0	1	0	+1	100.00
São Paulo	75	24	22	29	86	105	−19	32.00
São Paulo-RS	1	0	1	0	0	0	+0	0.00
Sergipe	4	4	0	0	7	1	+6	100.00
Sport	44	24	9	11	72	41	+31	54.55
Tiradentes-PI	4	3	0	1	11	4	+7	75.00
Treze	2	2	0	0	8	1	+7	100.00
Uberaba	2	1	1	0	5	3	+2	50.00
União São João	2	0	2	0	2	2	+0	0.00
Vasco da Gama	68	25	26	17	93	75	+18	36.76
Vitória	46	27	10	9	81	45	+36	58.70
Vitória-ES	1	1	0	0	3	0	+3	100.00
Volta Redonda	2	1	1	0	5	1	+4	50.00
XV de Piracicaba	3	2	0	1	5	2	+3	66.67
Total	1,665	737	450	478	2,402	1,833	+569	44.26

=== Copa do Brasil ===
Season	Round	Pl.	W	D	L	GS	GA	Top scorer	Goals
1989	Semifinals	8	5	1	2	17	15	N/A	
1990	Champion	10	6	4	0	20	5	N/A	
1993	Semifinals	8	4	2	2	17	10	N/A	
1995	Semifinals	10	8	1	1	20	4	N/A	
1996	Semifinals	8	4	3	1	13	7	N/A	
1997	Runner-up	9	5	3	1	19	8	N/A	
1998	Round of 16	5	3	1	1	13	9	N/A	
1999	Quarterfinals	8	5	2	1	17	12	N/A	
2000	Quarterfinals	8	3	3	2	13	14	N/A	
2001	Quarterfinals	6	3	1	2	11	8	N/A	
2003	Runner-up	11	7	2	2	20	10	N/A	
2004	Runner-up	12	8	3	1	22	11	N/A	
2005	Round of 16	5	2	2	1	7	5	N/A	
2006	Champion	12	8	3	1	23	7	N/A	
2009	Quarterfinals	6	3	2	1	11	2	(Qatar) Emerson	3
2011	Quarterfinals	6	3	2	1	13	5	(Brazil) Wanderley	3
2013	Champion	14	11	2	1	26	9	(Brazil) Hernane	8
2014	Semifinals	6	4	0	2	8	7	(Brazil) Alecsandro, (Brazil) Gabriel	2
2015	Round of 16	7	4	2	1	10	4	(Brazil) Wallace, (Brazil) Pará, (Brazil) Jorge, (Brazil) Marcelo Cirino, (Peru) Paolo Guerrero, (Brazil) Paulinho, (Brazil) Alecsandro, (Croatia) Eduardo da Silva, (Brazil) Arthur Maia	1
2016	Second round	4	1	0	3	5	5	(Brazil) Marcelo Cirino	2
2017	Runner-up	8	3	4	1	8	6	(Peru) Paolo Guerrero	2
2018	Semifinals	6	2	3	1	4	3	(Brazil) Henrique Dourado, (Brazil) Éverton Ribeiro, (Brazil) Lincoln	1
2019	Quarterfinals	4	2	2	0	4	2	(Brazil) Gabriel Barbosa	2
2020	Quarterfinals	4	2	0	2	5	7	(Brazil) Pedro	2
2021	Semifinals	8	6	1	1	18	5	(Brazil) Pedro	3
2022	Champion	10	6	3	1	13	5	(Uruguay) Giorgian de Arrascaeta, (Brazil) Pedro	3
2023	Runner-up	10	6	2	2	18	7	(Brazil) Pedro	5^{s}
2024	Champion	10	8	1	1	11	2	(Brazil) Pedro	3
2025	Round of 16	4	3	0	1	6	3	(Brazil) Everton	2
2026	Fifth round	2	1	0	1	2	3	(Brazil) Pedro, (Brazil) Evertton Araújo	1
Total		229	136	55	38	394	200		

tournament topscorer

^{S} shared

==== All-time Copa do Brasil record ====
Statistics correct as of match played on 14 May 2026.

- Clubs with this background in the "Club" column are defunct.
- Pld = matches played; W = matches won; D = matches drawn; L = matches lost; GF = Goals scored; GA = Goals conceded; Win% = percentage of total matches won

Flamengo Copa do Brasil record by opponent
Club	Pld	W	D	L	GF	GA	GD	Win%
ABC	5	5	0	0	15	1	+14	100.00
Altos	2	2	0	0	4	1	+3	100.00
Amazonas	2	2	0	0	2	0	+2	100.00
América-RN	4	3	1	0	8	2	+6	75.00
Athletico Paranaense	12	6	5	1	15	12	+3	50.00
Atlético Goianiense	2	1	1	0	2	1	+1	50.00
Atlético Mineiro	10	6	1	3	15	9	+6	60.00
ASA	4	3	1	0	7	3	+4	75.00
Bahia	6	4	2	0	8	3	+5	66.67
Blumenau	2	2	0	0	6	2	+4	100.00
Botafogo	4	2	2	0	6	1	+5	50.00
Botafogo-PB	5	4	1	0	14	7	+7	80.00
Brasil de Pelotas	2	2	0	0	4	1	+3	100.00
Campinense	2	2	0	0	4	2	+2	100.00
Campelense	2	2	0	0	9	1	+8	100.00
Ceará	6	1	2	3	5	8	−3	16.67
Confiança	2	1	0	1	3	1	+2	50.00
Corinthians	10	4	4	2	9	7	+2	40.00
Coritiba	8	4	2	2	11	8	+3	50.00
CRB	2	1	1	0	7	5	+2	50.00
Cruzeiro	10	2	6	2	8	9	−1	20.00
Fluminense	2	1	1	0	2	0	+2	50.00
Fortaleza	5	2	1	2	8	4	+4	40.00
Gama	3	3	0	0	9	3	+6	100.00
Goiás	4	3	1	0	5	2	+3	75.00
Grêmio	19	10	6	3	29	20	+9	52.63
Guarani	4	2	1	1	10	5	+5	50.00
Horizonte	2	1	1	0	4	1	+3	50.00
Ivinhema	1	1	0	0	5	0	+5	100.00
Juventude	2	1	0	1	3	3	+0	50.00
Londrina	2	1	1	0	2	1	+1	50.00
Kaburé	2	2	0	0	9	0	+9	100.00
Linhares	2	2	0	0	5	1	+4	100.00
Internacional	6	2	2	2	8	7	+1	33.33
Ipatinga	2	1	1	0	3	2	+1	50.00
Maringá	2	1	0	1	8	4	+4	50.00
Murici	1	1	0	0	3	0	+3	100.00
Nacional-AM	1	1	0	0	6	2	+4	100.00
Náutico	4	2	2	0	8	3	+5	50.00
Operário-MS	2	1	1	0	4	0	+4	50.00
Palmeiras	6	4	0	2	9	6	+3	66.67
Paysandu	4	3	0	1	9	4	+5	75.00
Ponte Preta	4	3	1	0	5	0	+5	75.00
Remo	5	5	0	0	13	2	+11	100.00
River-PI	5	3	2	0	8	3	+5	60.00
Rio Branco	2	1	0	1	6	3	+3	50.00
Salgueiro	1	1	0	0	2	0	+2	100.00
Santa Cruz	2	2	0	0	2	0	+2	100.00
Santo André	2	0	1	1	2	4	−2	0.00
Santos	4	1	0	3	6	12	−6	25.00
São Paulo	6	2	1	3	6	8	−2	33.33
Sousa	2	2	0	0	2	0	+2	100.00
Sport	2	1	1	0	1	0	+1	50.00
Taguatinga	2	1	1	0	3	1	+2	50.00
Tupi	2	2	0	0	7	2	+5	100.00
Vasco da Gama	4	2	1	1	4	2	+2	50.00
Vitória	8	6	0	2	15	12	+3	75.00
Ypiranga-AP	1	1	0	0	2	0	+2	100.00
Total	229	136	55	38	394	200	+194	59.39

=== Supercopa do Brasil ===
Season	Round	Pl.	W	D	L	GS	GA	Top scorer	Goals
1991	Runners-up	1	0	0	1	0	1		
2020	Champion	1	1	0	0	3	0	(Brazil) Gabriel Barbosa, (Brazil) Bruno Henrique, (Uruguay) Giorgian de Arrascaeta	1^{s}
2021	Champion	1	0	1	0	2	2	(Brazil) Gabriel Barbosa, (Brazil) Bruno Henrique	1^{s}
2022	Runners-up	1	0	1	0	2	2	(Brazil) Gabriel Barbosa, (Brazil) Bruno Henrique	1^{s}
2023	Runners-up	1	0	0	1	3	4	(Brazil) Gabriel Barbosa	2^{s}
2025	Champion	1	1	0	0	3	1	(Brazil) Bruno Henrique	2
2026	Runners-up	1	0	0	1	0	2		
Total		7	2	2	3	13	12		

tournament topscorer

^{S} shared

=== FIFA tournaments ===
==== FIFA Club World Cup ====
Season	Round	Pl.	W	D	L	GS	GA	Top scorer	Goals
2019	Runners-up	2	1	0	1	3	2	(Uruguay) Giorgian de Arrascaeta, (Brazil) Bruno Henrique	1
2022	3rd place	2	1	0	1	6	5	(Brazil) Pedro	4
2025	Round of 16	4	2	1	1	8	6	(Brazil) Wallace Yan	2
Total		8	4	1	3	17	13		

tournament topscorer

==== FIFA Intecontinental Cup ====
Season	Round	Pl.	W	D	L	GS	GA	Top scorer	Goals
2025	Runners-up	3	2	1	0	5	2	(Uruguay) Giorgian de Arrascaeta	2
Total		3	2	1	0	5	2		

=== Conmebol tournaments ===
==== Recopa Sudamericana ====
Season	Round	Pl.	W	D	L	GS	GA	Top scorer	Goals
2020	Champion	2	1	1	0	5	2	(Brazil) Gerson	2
2023	Runners-up	2	1	0	1	1	1	(Uruguay) Giorgian de Arrascaeta	1^{s}
2026	Runners-up	2	0	0	2	2	4	(Uruguay) Giorgian de Arrascaeta, (Italy) Jorginho	1
Total		6	2	1	3	8	7		

tournament topscorer

^{S} shared

==== Copa Libertadores ====
Season	Round	Pl.	W	D	L	GS	GA	Top scorer	Goals
1981	Champion	14	9	4	1	28	13	(Brazil) Zico	11
1982	Semifinals	4	2	0	2	7	4	(Brazil) Zico	2
1983	Group Stage	6	2	2	2	15	10	(Brazil) Elder	3
1984	Semifinals	11	8	2	1	28	13	(Brazil) Tita	8
1991	Quarterfinals	10	6	3	1	21	10	(Brazil) Gaúcho	8
1993	Quarterfinals	10	5	2	3	19	12	(Brazil) Nílson	3
2002	Group stage	6	1	1	4	6	9	(Brazil) Juninho Paulista	2
2007	Round of 16	8	6	1	1	12	7	(Brazil) Renato Abreu	5
2008	Round of 16	8	5	1	2	13	9	(Brazil) Marcinho	5
2010	Quarterfinals	10	5	1	4	17	15	(Brazil) Vágner Love, (Brazil) Adriano	4
2012	Group stage	8	3	2	3	15	12	(Brazil) Luiz Antônio	3
2014	Group stage	6	2	1	3	10	10	(Brazil) Éverton Cardoso	3
2017	Group stage	6	3	0	3	11	7	(Brazil) Diego, (Peru) Paolo Guerrero, (Peru) Miguel Trauco, (Brazil) Rodinei	2
2018	Round of 16	8	3	4	1	8	6	(Brazil) Henrique Dourado, (Brazil) Vinícius Jr., (Brazil) Éverton Ribeiro	2
2019	Champion	13	7	3	3	24	10	(Brazil) Gabriel Barbosa	9
2020	Round of 16	8	5	2	1	16	10	(Brazil) Bruno Henrique	4
2021	Runners-up	13	9	3	1	33	14	(Brazil) Gabriel Barbosa	11
2022	Champion	13	12	1	0	33	8	(Brazil) Pedro	12
2023	Round of 16	8	4	2	2	13	8	(Brazil) Pedro, (Brazil) Bruno Henrique	3
2024	Quarterfinals	10	4	2	4	13	6	(Brazil) Pedro	5
2025	Champion	13	8	3	2	13	5	(Uruguay) Giorgian de Arrascaeta, (Brazil) Pedro	2
2026	Semifinals	12	7	5	0	20	5	(Brazil) Bruno Henrique	5
Total		205	116	45	44	375	203		

tournament topscorer

==== Copa Sudamericana ====
Season	Round	Pl.	W	D	L	GS	GA	Top scorer	Goals
2003	Preliminary round	2	0	0	2	1	6	(Brazil) Zé Carlos	1
2004	Preliminary round	2	0	2	0	2	2	(Brazil) Ibson	2
2009	Preliminary round	2	0	2	0	1	1	(Brazil) Dênis Marques	1
2011	Round of 16	4	2	0	2	2	5	(Brazil) Ronaldinho	2
2016	Round of 16	4	2	0	2	7	7	(Brazil) Alan Patrick	2
2017	Runners-up	10	6	3	1	24	9	(Brazil) Felipe Vizeu	5^{s}
Total		24	10	7	7	37	30		

tournament topscorer

^{S} shared

=== Defunct tournaments ===
==== Supercopa Libertadores ====
Season	Round	Pl.	W	D	L	GS	GA	Top scorer	Goals
1988	Second round	4	1	1	2	4	6	(Brazil) Bebeto	3
1989	First round	2	0	0	2	1	3	(Brazil) Nando	1
1990	First round	2	1	0	1	4	4	(Brazil) Luis Antônio, (Brazil) Nélio, (Brazil) Renato Gaúcho, (Brazil) Gaúcho	1
1991	Quarterfinals	4	2	1	1	5	3	(Brazil) Gaúcho	3
1992	Semifinals	6	2	3	1	7	6	(Brazil) Rogério Lourenço	2
1993	Runners-up	8	4	2	2	14	9	(Brazil) Renato Gaúcho	4
1994	Round of 16	2	0	1	1	0	2	---	0
1995	Runners-up	8	7	0	1	13	5	(Brazil) Edmundo, (Brazil) Rodrigo Mendes, (Brazil) Romário, (Brazil) Sávio	2
1996	Quarterfinals	4	1	2	1	2	2	(Brazil) Fábio Baiano, (Brazil) Júnior Baiano	1
1997	Group stage	6	3	1	2	10	7	(Brazil) Sávio	4
Total		46	21	11	14	60	47		

==== Copa Mercosur ====
Season	Round	Pl.	W	D	L	GS	GA	Top scorer	Goals
1998	Group stage	6	3	0	3	7	8	(Brazil) Romário	4
1999	Champion	12	6	3	3	33	18	(Brazil) Romário	8
2000	Quarterfinals	8	3	2	3	14	9	(Serbia) Dejan Petković	5
2001	Runners-up	12	6	5	1	18	9	(Brazil) Juan	5
Total		38	18	10	10	72	44		

tournament topscorer

==== Copa de Oro ====
Season	Round	Pl.	W	D	L	GS	GA	Top scorer	Goals
1996	Champion	2	2	0	0	5	2	(Brazil) Sávio	3

tournament topscorer

==== Intercontinental Cup ====
Season	Round	Pl.	W	D	L	GS	GA	Top scorer	Goals
1981	Champion	1	1	0	0	3	0	(Brazil) Nunes	2

tournament topscorer

==== All-time international record ====
Statistics correct as of match played on 22 October 2026.

- Pld = matches played; W = matches won; D = matches drawn; L = matches lost; GF = Goals scored; GA = Goals conceded; Win% = percentage of total matches won

Flamengo international record by opponent (Note: Includes Copa Libertadores, Copa Sudamericana, Recopa Sudamericana, Copa Mercosur, Supercopa Libertadores, Copa de Oro, Intercontinental Cup, FIFA Intercontinental Cup and FIFA Club World Cup.)
Club	Country	Pld	W	D	L	GF	GA	GD	Win%
Al Ahly	(Egypt)	1	1	0	0	4	2	+2	100.00
Al Hilal	(Saudi Arabia)	2	1	0	1	5	4	+1	50.00
América	(Mexico)	2	1	0	1	4	5	−1	50.00
América de Cali	(Colombia)	4	1	1	2	7	8	−1	25.00
Argentinos Juniors	(Argentina)	4	1	0	3	5	7	−2	25.00
Athletico Paranaense	(Brazil)	5	4	0	1	6	3	+3	80.00
Atlético Mineiro	(Brazil)	3	1	2	0	4	4	+0	33.33
Atlético Nacional	(Colombia)	2	2	0	0	4	1	+3	100.00
Aucas	(Ecuador)	2	1	0	1	5	2	+3	50.00
Bayern Munich	(Germany)	1	0	0	1	2	4	−2	0.00
Barcelona	(Ecuador)	4	4	0	0	9	1	+8	100.00
Bella Vista	(Uruguay)	2	0	2	0	3	3	+0	0.00
Blooming	(Bolivia)	2	1	1	0	7	1	+6	50.00
Boca Juniors	(Argentina)	4	1	0	3	2	9	−7	25.00
Bolívar	(Bolivia)	8	3	1	4	15	11	+4	37.50
Caracas	(Venezuela)	2	2	0	0	6	3	+3	100.00
Central Córdoba	(Argentina)	2	0	1	1	2	3	−1	0.00
Cerro Porteño	(Paraguay)	4	4	0	0	14	6	+8	100.00
Chapecoense	(Brazil)	2	1	1	0	4	0	+4	50.00
Cienciano	(Peru)	2	2	0	0	5	1	+4	100.00
Chelsea	(England)	1	1	0	0	3	1	+2	100.00
Cobreloa	(Chile)	3	2	0	1	4	2	+2	66.67
Colo-Colo	(Chile)	4	1	2	1	7	4	+3	25.00
Corinthians	(Brazil)	6	4	1	1	8	3	+5	66.67
Coronel Bolognesi	(Peru)	2	1	1	0	2	0	+2	50.00
Cruz Azul	(Mexico)	1	1	0	0	2	1	+1	100.00
Cruzeiro	(Brazil)	6	4	1	1	8	5	+3	66.67
Cusco	(Peru)	2	2	0	0	5	0	+5	100.00
Defensa y Justicia	(Argentina)	2	2	0	0	5	1	+4	100.00
Defensor Sporting	(Uruguay)	2	1	0	1	2	3	−1	50.00
Deportes Tolima	(Colombia)	2	2	0	0	8	1	+7	100.00
Deportivo Cali	(Colombia)	2	2	0	0	4	0	+4	100.00
Deportivo Táchira	(Venezuela)	4	4	0	0	10	2	+8	100.00
Emelec	(Ecuador)	8	6	0	2	14	8	+6	75.00
Espérance de Tunis	(Tunisia)	1	1	0	0	2	0	+2	100.00
Estudiantes de La Plata	(Argentina)	14	5	7	2	13	8	+5	35.71
Figueirense	(Brazil)	2	1	1	0	5	5	+0	50.00
Fluminense	(Brazil)	4	1	3	0	5	4	+1	25.00
Grêmio	(Brazil)	11	3	6	2	16	14	+2	27.27
Independiente	(Argentina)	10	4	4	2	13	16	−3	40.00
Independiente del Valle	(Ecuador)	8	4	2	2	13	9	+4	50.00
Independiente Medellín	(Colombia)	2	2	0	0	7	1	+6	100.00
Internacional	(Brazil)	7	4	2	1	10	5	+5	57.14
Jorge Wilstermann	(Bolivia)	2	2	0	0	6	2	+4	100.00
Junior	(Colombia)	6	6	0	0	14	5	+9	100.00
Lanús	(Argentina)	4	1	1	2	6	5	+1	25.00
LDU Quito	(Ecuador)	6	3	2	1	11	7	+4	50.00
León	(Mexico)	2	0	0	2	3	5	−2	0.00
Liverpool	(England)	2	1	0	1	3	1	+2	50.00
Los Angeles FC	(United States)	1	0	1	0	1	1	+0	0.00
Maracaibo	(Venezuela)	2	2	0	0	5	2	+3	100.00
Millonarios	(Colombia)	2	1	1	0	4	1	+3	50.00
Minervén	(Venezuela)	2	2	0	0	9	2	+7	100.00
Nacional	(Uruguay)	12	8	0	4	17	13	+4	66.67
Ñublense	(Chile)	2	1	1	0	3	1	+2	50.00
Olimpia	(Paraguay)	18	8	5	5	31	23	+8	44.44
Once Caldas	(Colombia)	2	1	0	1	4	2	+2	50.00
Palestino	(Chile)	6	4	0	2	14	5	+9	66.67
Palmeiras	(Brazil)	4	2	1	1	9	8	+1	50.00
Paraná	(Brazil)	2	2	0	0	2	0	+2	100.00
Paris Saint-Germain	(France)	1	0	1	0	1	1	+0	0.00
Peñarol	(Uruguay)	8	1	2	5	5	7	−2	12.50
Pyramids	(Egypt)	1	1	0	0	2	0	+2	100.00
Racing	(Argentina)	8	2	5	1	9	8	+1	25.00
Real Potosí	(Bolivia)	4	2	1	1	6	4	+2	50.00
River Plate	(Argentina)	13	5	3	5	20	17	+3	38.46
Rosario Central	(Argentina)	1	1	0	0	2	1	+1	100.00
San José	(Bolivia)	2	2	0	0	7	1	+6	100.00
San Lorenzo	(Argentina)	6	3	2	1	10	5	+5	50.00
Santa Fe	(Colombia)	2	0	2	0	1	1	+0	0.00
Santos	(Brazil)	5	2	2	1	11	6	+5	40.00
São Paulo	(Brazil)	7	2	3	2	11	11	+0	28.57
Sporting Cristal	(Peru)	2	2	0	0	4	1	+3	100.00
Talleres	(Argentina)	2	1	1	0	5	3	+2	50.00
Unión La Calera	(Chile)	2	1	1	0	6	3	+3	50.00
Universidad Católica	(Chile)	8	4	0	4	13	11	+2	50.00
Universidad de Chile	(Chile)	10	4	1	5	20	15	+5	40.00
Universidad de Los Andes	(Venezuela)	2	2	0	0	5	1	+4	100.00
Vélez Sarsfield	(Argentina)	12	8	2	2	23	8	+15	66.67
Total		333	176	76	81	582	348	+234	52.85

== Average attendances ==
Current national league format

Season	Division	Matches	Total attendance	Avg. attendance	Main home stadium
2003	Série A	23	253,460	11,020	Maracanã
2004	Série A	23	239,361	10,407	Raulino de Oliveira
2005	Série A	21	286,797	13,657	Arena Petrobras
2006	Série A	19	298,509	15,711	Maracanã
2007	Série A	19	798,285	42,015	Maracanã
2008	Série A	19	830,984	43,736	Maracanã
2009	Série A	19	761,406	40,074	Maracanã
2010	Série A	19	359,955	18,945	Engenhão
2011	Série A	19	371,374	19,546	Engenhão
2012	Série A	19	265,164	13,956	Engenhão
2013	Série A	19	500,650	26,350	Maracanã
2014	Série A	19	575,126	30,270	Maracanã
2015	Série A	19	598,538	31,502	Maracanã
2016	Série A	19	483,781	25,462	Kléber Andrade
2017	Série A	19	314,812	16,569	Ilha do Urubu
2018	Série A	19	936,759	49,303	Maracanã
2019	Série A	19	1,126,406	59,284	Maracanã
2020	Série A	0 (Note: All matches were played behind closed doors due to the COVID-19 pandemic in Brazil.)	–	–	Maracanã
2021	Série A	9 (Note: Ten home matches were played behind closed doors due to the COVID-19 pandemic in Brazil.)	160,194	17,199	Maracanã
2022	Série A	19	1,037,387	54,599	Maracanã
2023	Série A	19	1,092,525	57,501	Maracanã
2024	Série A	19	1.034.489	54,447	Maracanã
2025	Série A	19	1.188.406	62,548	Maracanã
Total		418	13,354,174	31,948	
