= List of CR Flamengo managers =

From the opening of Flamengo's football department in 1912 up until 1920 the club had no official head coach. The job of commanding the professional team consisted in a Ground Committee usually improvised, composed by the team captains and club directors. In 1920 the club has its first solo head coach, the Uruguayan Ramón Platero, only lasting for 9 matches. The Ground Committee appeared again in 1923, this time in its last appearance.

Flamengo had a total of 86 different head coaches from 9 different nationalities in 145 spells during the 114 years of its football department history.

== Head coaches ==
The following is a list of Clube de Regatas do Flamengo head coaches.

P = Matches played; W = Matches won; D = Matches drawn; L = Matches lost; GF = Goals for; GA = Goals against

As of match played 4 November 2026

No.	Image	Name	Nationality	From	To	Time in Charge	P	W	D	L	GF	GA	Win %	Notes / Honours
–		Ground Committee	Brazil	1912	1920		173	101	38	34	–	–	58.38	1914 Campeonato Carioca; 1915 Campeonato Carioca; 1920 Campeonato Carioca
1st		Ramón Platero	Uruguay	1921	1921		9	3	2	4	15	16	33.33	First solo coach and first foreign coach.
2nd		Telefone	Brazil	1921	1922		29	18	7	4	68	36	62.07	1921 Campeonato Carioca
–		Ground Committee	Brazil	1923	1923		29	16	8	5	–	–	55.17	
3rd		Joaquim Guimarães	Brazil	1924	1924		16	12	2	2	–	–	75.00	
4th		José Seabra	Brazil	1924	1925		9	7	2	0	32	9	77.78	
5th		Juan Carlos Bertoni	Uruguay	1925	1925		22	16	3	3	–	–	72.73	1925 Campeonato Carioca
6th 7th		Joaquim Guimarães & Juan Carlos Bertoni	Brazil; Uruguay	1926	1928		74	41	12	21	–	–	55.41	1927 Campeonato Carioca
8th 9th		Joaquim Guimarães & Raphael Candiota	Brazil; Brazil	1929	1929		34	11	5	18	–	–	32.35	
10th		Charles Williams	England	1930	1931		45	16	4	25	86	97	35.56	First coach from outside South America.
11th		Joaquim Guimarães	Brazil	1931	1932		13	9	0	4	–	–	69.23	
12th		Milton Caldas	Brazil	1932	1932		34	20	6	8	–	–	58.82	
13th		Augusto Gonçalves	Brazil	1933	1933		19	9	5	5	51	39	47.37	
14th 15th		Alessandro Baldassini & Eugenio Matarazzo	Brazil; Brazil	1933	1933		8	1	2	5	–	–	12.50	
16th 17th		Luís Gama & Milton Caldas	Brazil; Brazil	1933	1934		28	7	5	16	–	–	25.00	
18th		Flávio Costa	Brazil	16 September 1934	10 January 1937	2 years, 116 days	102	63	21	18	–	–	61.76	
19th		Dori Kürschner	Hungary	1937	1938		71	39	11	21	213	135	54.93	
20th		Hilton Santos	Brazil	1938	1938		11	8	2	1	–	–	72.73	
21st		Flávio Costa	Brazil	8 December 1938	18 November 1945	6 years, 345 days	293	164	62	67	–	–	55.97	Longest period of a head coach in the club's history 1939 Campeonato Carioca; 1942 Campeonato Carioca; 1943 Campeonato Carioca; 1944 Campeonato Carioca
22nd		Jaime de Almeida	Brazil	1946	1946		2	1	0	1	–	–	50.00	
23rd		Flávio Costa	Brazil	10 March 1946	21 December 1946	286 days	49	27	6	16	–	–	55.10	
24th		Ernesto Santos	Portugal	1947	1947		48	27	10	11	131	93	56.25	Flamengo's first Portuguese head coach.
25th		Jaime de Almeida	Brazil	1947	1947		5	2	1	2	–	–	40.00	
26th		Juca da Praia	Brazil	1948	1948		40	24	5	11	–	–	60.00	
27th		Kanela	Brazil	1948	1949		42	28	6	8	–	–	66.67	
28th		Gentil Cardoso	Brazil	1949	1950		56	35	13	8	–	–	62.50	
29th		Jaime de Almeida	Brazil	1950	1950		5	1	1	3	–	–	20.00	
30th		Candido de Oliveira	Portugal	1950	1950		13	4	2	7	–	–	30.77	Flamengo's second Portuguese head coach.
31st		Jaime de Almeida	Brazil	1950	1951		7	3	2	2	–	–	42.86	
32nd		Flávio Costa	Brazil	17 February 1951	21 December 1952	1 year, 308 days	101	63	15	23	–	–	62.38	
33rd		Jaime de Almeida	Brazil	1953	1953		19	9	7	3	–	–	47.37	
34th		Fleitas Solich	Paraguay	1953	1957		276	175	47	54	–	–	63.41	1953 Campeonato Carioca; 1954 Campeonato Carioca; 1955 Campeonato Carioca
35th		Jaime de Almeida	Brazil	1958	1958		8	3	4	1	–	–	37.50	
36th		Fleitas Solich	Paraguay	1958	1959		90	53	18	19	–	–	58.89	
37th		Jaime de Almeida	Brazil	1959	1959		23	13	5	5	–	–	56.52	
38th		Modesto Bria	Paraguay	1959	1960		46	27	7	12	–	–	58.70	
39th		Fleitas Solich	Paraguay	1960	1962		99	59	18	22	–	–	59.60	1961 Torneio Rio-São Paulo
40th		Flávio Costa	Brazil	21 January 1962	22 July 1965	182 days	220	122	43	55	–	–	55.45	1963 Campeonato Carioca
41st		Armando Renganeschi	Argentina	1965	1967		127	55	33	39	–	–	43.31	1965 Campeonato Carioca
42nd		Modesto Bria	Paraguay	1967	1967		17	7	3	7	–	–	41.18	
43rd		Aymoré Moreira	Brazil	1967	1968		20	7	3	10	–	–	35.00	
44th		Walter Miraglia	Brazil	1968	1968		58	27	15	16	–	–	46.55	
45th		Tim	Brazil	1969	1969		61	28	18	15	–	–	45.90	
46th		Joubert	Brazil	1969	1969		5	1	2	2	–	–	20.00	
47th		Yustrich	Brazil	1970	1971		93	45	28	20	–	–	48.39	
48th		Fleitas Solich	Paraguay	1971	1971		39	13	17	9	–	–	33.33	
49th		Mário Zagallo	Brazil	1972	1972		28	17	9	2	–	–	60.71	
50th		Joubert	Brazil	1972	1972		6	2	4	0	–	–	33.33	
51st		Mário Zagallo	Brazil	1972	1973		65	31	19	15	–	–	47.69	1972 Campeonato Carioca
52nd		Joubert	Brazil	1973	1973		8	5	2	1	–	–	62.50	
53rd		Mário Zagallo	Brazil	1973	1973		39	15	7	17	–	–	38.46	
54th		Joubert	Brazil	1973	1974		132	71	37	24	–	–	53.79	1974 Campeonato Carioca
55th		Carlos Froner	Brazil	1974	1975		86	53	21	12	–	–	61.63	
56th		Cláudio Coutinho	Brazil	1976	1977		77	50	18	9	–	–	64.94	
57th		Jaime Valente	Brazil	1977	1978		31	18	9	4	–	–	58.06	
58th		Joubert	Brazil	1978	1978		32	18	8	6	–	–	56.25	
59th		Cláudio Coutinho	Brazil	1978	1980		189	130	41	18	–	–	68.78	1978 Campeonato Carioca; 1979 Campeonato Carioca; 1979 Campeonato Carioca (Especial); 1980 Campeonato Brasileiro Série A
60th		Modesto Bria	Paraguay	1981	1981		17	10	5	2	–	–	58.82	
61st		Dino Sani	Brazil	1981	1981		24	13	8	3	–	–	54.17	
62nd		Paulo César Carpegiani	Brazil	1981	1983		116	71	27	18	–	–	61.21	1981 Campeonato Carioca; 1981 Copa Libertadores; 1981 Intercontinental Cup; 1982 Campeonato Brasileiro Série A
63rd		Carlinhos	Brazil	1983	1983		5	1	3	1	–	–	20.00	
64th		Carlos Alberto Torres	Brazil	1983	1983		26	13	4	9	–	–	50.00	1983 Campeonato Brasileiro Série A
65th		Cláudio Garcia	Brazil	1983	1984		46	28	9	9	–	–	60.87	
66th		Mário Zagallo	Brazil	1984	1985		73	37	19	17	–	–	50.68	
67th		Joubert	Brazil	1985	1985		11	5	4	2	–	–	45.45	
68th		Sebastião Lazaroni	Brazil	1985	1987		100	55	24	21	–	–	55.00	1986 Campeonato Carioca
69th		Carlinhos	Brazil	1987	1987		6	2	4	0	–	–	33.33	
70th		Antônio Lopes	Brazil	1987	1987		40	24	9	7	–	–	60.00	
71st		Carlinhos	Brazil	1987	1988		55	29	15	11	–	–	52.73	1987 Copa União
72nd		Candinho	Brazil	1988	1988		16	9	3	4	–	–	56.25	
73rd		Telê Santana	Brazil	1988	1989		62	37	15	10	–	–	59.68	
74th		Valdir Espinosa	Brazil	1989	1990		37	16	11	10	–	–	43.24	
75th		Jair Pereira	Brazil	1990	1990		60	36	12	12	–	–	60.00	1990 Copa do Brasil
76th		Vanderlei Luxemburgo	Brazil	1991	1991		52	24	14	14	–	–	46.15	
77th		Carlinhos	Brazil	1991	1993		107	60	29	18	–	–	56.07	1991 Campeonato Carioca; 1992 Campeonato Brasileiro Série A
78th		Jair Pereira	Brazil	1993	1993		30	17	7	6	–	–	56.67	
79th		Evaristo de Macedo	Brazil	1993	1993		24	7	9	8	–	–	29.17	
80th		Júnior	Brazil	1993	1994		44	20	12	12	–	–	45.45	
81st		Carlinhos	Brazil	1994	1994		37	13	14	10	–	–	35.14	
82nd		Edinho	Brazil	1994	1994		8	2	3	3	–	–	25.00	
83rd		Vanderlei Luxemburgo	Brazil	1995	1995		46	27	10	9	–	–	58.70	
84th		Edinho	Brazil	1995	1995		14	6	2	6	–	–	42.86	
85th		Washington Rodrigues	Brazil	1995	1995		26	11	8	7	–	–	42.31	
86th		Joel Santana	Brazil	1996	1996		79	43	21	15	–	–	54.43	1996 Campeonato Carioca; 1996 Copa de Oro
87th		Júnior	Brazil	1997	1997		23	13	6	4	–	–	56.52	
88th		Sebastião Rocha	Brazil	1997	1997		34	17	9	8	–	–	50.00	
89th		Paulo Autuori	Brazil	1997	1998		45	19	14	12	–	–	42.22	
90th		Joel Santana	Brazil	1998	1998		26	13	9	4	–	–	50.00	
90th		Evaristo de Macedo	Brazil	15 September 1998	1999		26	13	5	8	–	–	50.00	
91st		Carlinhos	Brazil	1999	1999		65	36	11	18	–	–	55.38	1999 Campeonato Carioca; 1999 Copa Mercosur
92nd		Paulo César Carpegiani	Brazil	2000	2000		22	12	4	6	–	–	54.55	
93rd		Carlinhos	Brazil	2000	2000		38	17	8	13	–	–	44.74	2000 Campeonato Carioca
94th		Mário Zagallo	Brazil	2000	2001		79	37	12	30	–	–	46.84	2001 Campeonato Carioca; 2001 Copa dos Campeões
95th		Carlos Alberto Torres	Brazil	2001	2002		8	1	2	5	–	–	12.50	
96th		João Carlos Costa	Brazil	4 February 2002	2002		22	5	7	10	–	–	22.73	
97th		Lula Pereira	Brazil	1 April 2002	29 August 2002	150 days	24	10	5	9	–	–	41.67	
98th		Evaristo de Macedo	Brazil	29 August 2002	16 March 2003	199 days	33	16	5	12	–	–	48.48	
99th		Nelsinho Baptista	Brazil	19 March 2003	16 July 2003	119 days	29	12	8	9	–	–	41.38	
100th		Oswaldo de Oliveira	Brazil	18 July 2003	13 October 2003	87 days	18	7	3	8	–	–	38.89	
101st		Waldemar Lemos	Brazil	14 October 2003	December 2003		11	6	3	2	–	–	54.55	Succeed his brother Oswaldo de Oliveira.
102nd		Abel Braga	Brazil	1 January 2004	27 July 2004	208 days	44	19	12	13	–	–	43.18	2004 Campeonato Carioca
103rd		Paulo César Gusmão	Brazil	27 July 2004	16 August 2004	20 days	5	2	0	3	–	–	40.00	
104th		Ricardo Gomes	Brazil	20 August 2004	1 November 2004	73 days	15	4	6	5	–	–	26.67	
105th		Júlio César Leal	Brazil	24 December 2004	3 February 2005	41 days	6	2	0	4	–	–	33.33	
106th		Cuca	Brazil	1 February 2005	15 April 2005	73 days	12	5	4	3	–	–	41.67	
107th		Celso Roth	Brazil	22 April 2005	29 August 2005	129 days	20	6	4	10	–	–	30.00	
108th		Joel Santana	Brazil	24 October 2005	28 November 2005	35 days	9	6	3	0	–	–	66.67	Saved the club from Série A relegation.
109th		Valdir Espinosa	Brazil	6 December 2005	3 March 2006	87 days	11	2	4	5	–	–	18.18	
110th		Waldemar Lemos	Brazil	3 March 2006	22 May 2006	80 days	18	8	5	5	–	–	44.44	
111th		Ney Franco	Brazil	22 May 2006	29 July 2007	1 year, 68 days	74	33	17	24	–	–	44.59	2006 Copa do Brasil; 2007 Campeonato Carioca
112th		Joel Santana	Brazil	30 Jul 30 2007	4 May 2008	279 days	54	35	7	12	–	–	64.81	Left the club to coach South Africa national team 2008 Campeonato Carioca
113th		Caio Júnior	Brazil	8 May 2008	10 December 2008	216 days	38	18	10	10	–	–	47.37	
114th		Cuca	Brazil	12 December 2008	23 July 2009	223 days	39	19	13	7	–	–	48.72	2009 Campeonato Carioca
115th		Andrade	Brazil	24 July 2009	23 April 2010	273 days	51	32	10	9	94	53	62.75	2009 Campeonato Brasileiro Série A
116th		Rogério Lourenço	Brazil	24 April 2010	26 August 2010	124 days	20	7	6	7	–	–	35.00	
117th		Paulo Silas	Brazil	29 August 2010	4 October 2010	36 days	10	1	6	3	–	–	10.00	
118th		Vanderlei Luxemburgo	Brazil	5 October 2010	2 February 2012	1 year, 120 days	70	32	27	11	106	73	45.71	2011 Campeonato Carioca
119th		Joel Santana	Brazil	3 February 2012	23 July 2012	171 days	29	15	5	9	51	40	51.72	
120th		Dorival Júnior	Brazil	23 July 2012	17 March 2013	237 days	37	15	12	10	42	37	40.54	
121st		Jorginho	Brazil	18 March 2013	6 June 2013	80 days	14	7	4	3	–	–	50.00	
122nd		Mano Menezes	Brazil	13 June 2013	19 September 2013	98 days	21	8	6	7	25	27	38.10	
123rd		Jayme de Almeida	Brazil	26 September 2013	12 May 2014	228 days	59	29	14	16	100	67	49.15	2013 Copa do Brasil; 2014 Campeonato Carioca
124th		Ney Franco	Brazil	13 May 2014	23 July 2014	71 days	7	0	3	4	3	13	0.00	
125th		Vanderlei Luxemburgo	Brazil	24 July 2014	25 May 2015	305 days	56	31	11	14	88	52	55.36	
126th		Cristóvão Borges	Brazil	27 May 2015	20 August 2015	85 days	18	8	1	9	19	23	44.44	
127th		Oswaldo de Oliveira	Brazil	20 August 2015	28 November 2015	100 days	18	8	3	7	24	21	44.44	
128th		Muricy Ramalho	Brazil	1 January 2016	26 May 2016	146 days	25	13	6	6	40	17	52.00	Resigned due to health problems.
129th		Zé Ricardo	Brazil	26 May 2016	6 August 2017	1 year, 72 days	89	48	25	16	147	84	53.93	2017 Campeonato Carioca
130th		Reinaldo Rueda	Colombia	13 August 2017	8 January 2018	148 days	31	13	10	8	39	26	41.94	Flamengo's first Colombian head coach.
131st		Paulo César Carpegiani	Brazil	8 January 2018	29 March 2018	80 days	17	11	3	3	27	11	64.71	
132nd		Maurício Barbieri	Brazil	30 March 2018	28 September 2018	182 days	38	18	12	8	46	28	47.37	
133rd		Dorival Júnior	Brazil	28 September 2018	31 December 2018	94 days	12	7	3	2	21	7	58.33	Second tenure as Flamengo's head coach.
134th		Abel Braga	Brazil	1 January 2019	29 May 2019	148 days	28	18	6	4	54	24	64.29	Second tenure as Flamengo's head coach. 2019 Campeonato Carioca
135th		Jorge Jesus	Portugal	1 June 2019	17 July 2020	1 year, 46 days	57	43	10	4	129	47	75.44	Flamengo's third Portuguese head coach. 2019 Copa Libertadores; 2019 Campeonato Brasileiro Série A 2020 Supercopa do Brasil; 2020 Recopa Sudamericana; 2020 Campeonato Carioca
136th		Domènec Torrent	Spain	31 July 2020	9 November 2020	101 days	26	15	5	6	46	38	57.69	Flamengo's first Spanish head coach.
137th		Rogério Ceni	Brazil	10 November 2020	10 July 2021	242 days	54	30	12	12	101	58	55.56	2020 Campeonato Brasileiro Série A 2021 Supercopa do Brasil; 2021 Campeonato Carioca
138th		Renato Gaúcho	Brazil	10 July 2021	29 November 2021	142 days	38	25	8	5	88	32	65.79	
139th		Paulo Sousa	Portugal	29 December 2021	9 June 2022	162 days	32	19	7	6	59	29	59.38	Flamengo's fourth Portuguese head coach.
140th		Dorival Júnior	Brazil	10 June 2022	31 December 2022	204 days	43	26	8	9	77	35	60.47	Third tenure as Flamengo's head coach. 2022 Copa do Brasil; 2022 Copa Libertadores
141st		Vítor Pereira	Portugal	1 January 2023	11 April 2023	100 days	18	10	1	7	36	24	55.56	Flamengo's fifth Portuguese head coach.
142nd		Jorge Sampaoli	Argentina	14 April 2023	28 September 2023	167 days	39	20	11	8	63	41	51.28	Flamengo's second Argentine head coach.
143rd		Tite	Brazil	9 October 2023	30 September 2024	357 days	67	40	11	16	107	49	59.70	2024 Campeonato Carioca
144th		Filipe Luís	Brazil	30 September 2024	3 March 2026	1 year, 154 days	101	64	22	15	187	69	63.37	2024 Copa do Brasil; 2025 Supercopa do Brasil; 2025 Campeonato Carioca; 2025 Copa Libertadores; 2025 Campeonato Brasileiro Série A 2025 Derby of the Americas; 2025 Challenger Cup
145th		Leonardo Jardim	Portugal	4 March 2026	present	246 days	46	30	12	4	89	33	65.22	Flamengo's sixth Portuguese head coach. 2026 Campeonato Carioca

== Interims and caretakers ==
The following is a list of Clube de Regatas do Flamengo head coaches who acted as interims or caretakers.

P = Matches played; W = Matches won; D = Matches drawn; L = Matches lost; GF = Goals for; GA = Goals against

As of match played 17 January 2026

Image	Name	Nationality	From	To	Time in Charge	P	W	D	L	GF	GA	Win %	Notes
	Maurício Souza (caretaker)	Brazil	29 November 2021	29 December 2021	30 days	4	1	1	2	3	5	25.00	
	Fábio Matias (interim)	Brazil	26 January 2022	29 January 2022	3 days	2	1	1	0	2	1	50.00	
	Mário Jorge (interim)	Brazil	10 April 2023	16 April 2023	6 days	2	1	0	1	3	2	50.00	
	Mário Jorge (interim)	Brazil	28 September 2023	9 October 2023	11 days	2	1	1	0	2	1	50.00	
	Mário Jorge (interim)	Brazil	21 January 2024	27 January 2024	6 days	2	0	2	0	1	1	0.00	
	Matheus Bachi (interim)	Brazil	23 August 2024	26 August 2024	3 days	1	1	0	0	2	1	100.00	
	Cleber dos Santos (interim)	Brazil	12 January 2025	22 January 2025	10 days	4	1	1	2	8	5	25.00	
	Bruno Pivetti (interim)	Brazil	6 December 2025	6 December 2025	1 day	1	0	1	0	3	3	0.00	
	Bruno Pivetti (interim)	Brazil	11 January 2026	17 January 2026	6 days	3	0	1	2	2	6	0.00	

== Head coaches by nationality ==
Nationality	Number
Brazil	70
Portugal	6
Uruguay	2
Paraguay	2
Argentina	2
England	1
Hungary	1
Colombia	1
Spain	1
Total	86

== Trophies ==
No.	Name	National			Regional			Continental					Intercontinental				Total
No.	Name	SA	CB	SC	CC	TRS*	CdC*	CCL	CCS	RS	CM*	CO*	IC*	FCC	FDotA	FCWC	Total
1	(Brazil) Filipe Luís	1	1	1	1	–	–	1	–	–	–	–	–	1	1	–	7
2	(Brazil) Carlinhos	2	–	–	3	–	–	–	–	–	1	–	–	–	–	–	6
3	(Portugal) Jorge Jesus	1	–	1	1	–	–	1	–	1	–	–	–	–	–	–	5
3	(Brazil) Flávio Costa	–	–	–	5	–	–	–	–	–	–	–	–	–	–	–	5
5	(Brazil) Paulo César Carpegiani	1	–	–	1	–	–	1	–	–	–	–	1	–	–	–	4
5	(Brazil) Cláudio Coutinho	1	–	–	3	–	–	–	–	–	–	–	–	–	–	–	4
5	(Paraguay) Fleitas Solich	–	–	–	3	1	–	–	–	–	–	–	–	–	–	–	4
8	(Brazil) Rogério Ceni	1	–	1	1	–	–	–	–	–	–	–	–	–	–	–	3
8	(Brazil) Mário Zagallo	–	–	–	2	–	1	–	–	–	–	–	–	–	–	–	3
8	(Brazil) Joel Santana	–	–	–	2	–	–	–	–	–	–	1	–	–	–	–	3
11	(Brazil) Dorival Júnior	–	1	–	–	–	–	1	–	–	–	–	–	–	–	–	2
11	(Brazil) Ney Franco	–	1	–	1	–	–	–	–	–	–	–	–	–	–	–	2
11	(Brazil) Jayme de Almeida	–	1	–	1	–	–	–	–	–	–	–	–	–	–	–	2
11	(Brazil) Ground Committee	–	–	–	2	–	–	–	–	–	–	–	–	–	–	–	2
11	(Brazil) Abel Braga	–	–	–	2	–	–	–	–	–	–	–	–	–	–	–	2
16	(Brazil) Carlos Alberto Torres	1	–	–	–	–	–	–	–	–	–	–	–	–	–	–	1
16	(Brazil) Andrade	1	–	–	–	–	–	–	–	–	–	–	–	–	–	–	1
16	(Brazil) Jair Pereira	–	1	–	–	–	–	–	–	–	–	–	–	–	–	–	1
16	(Brazil) Telefone	–	–	–	1	–	–	–	–	–	–	–	–	–	–	–	1
16	(Uruguay) Juan Carlos Bertoni	–	–	–	1	–	–	–	–	–	–	–	–	–	–	–	1
16	(Uruguay) Juan Carlos Bertoni & (Brazil) Joaquim Guimarães	–	–	–	1	–	–	–	–	–	–	–	–	–	–	–	1
16	(Argentina) Armando Renganeschi	–	–	–	1	–	–	–	–	–	–	–	–	–	–	–	1
16	(Brazil) Sebastião Lazaroni	–	–	–	1	–	–	–	–	–	–	–	–	–	–	–	1
16	(Brazil) Cuca	–	–	–	1	–	–	–	–	–	–	–	–	–	–	–	1
16	(Brazil) Vanderlei Luxemburgo	–	–	–	1	–	–	–	–	–	–	–	–	–	–	–	1
16	(Brazil) Zé Ricardo	–	–	–	1	–	–	–	–	–	–	–	–	–	–	–	1
16	(Brazil) Tite	–	–	–	1	–	–	–	–	–	–	–	–	–	–	–	1
16	(Portugal) Leonardo Jardim	–	–	–	1	–	–	–	–	–	–	–	–	–	–	–	1
Total		9	5	3	40	1	1	4	0	1	1	1	1	1	1	0	66

(*) Dufunct competitions
