= List of Al Hilal SFC managers =

Since its foundation, Al Hilal has had 67 managers. The first was Hasan Sultan, and the current as of June 5th 2025 ) is Simone Inzaghi.

== List ==
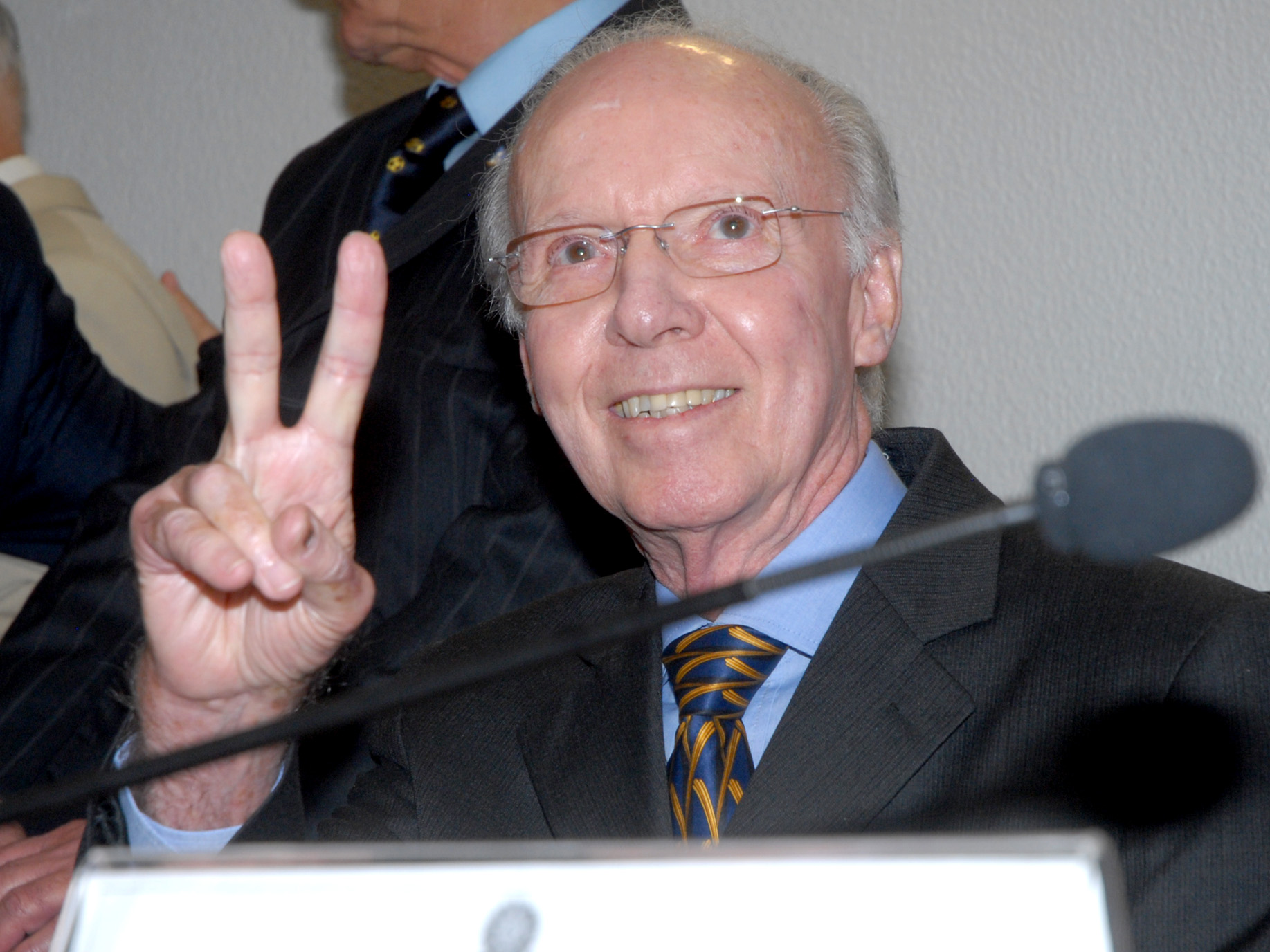
Zagallo is one of the best coaches in the history of Al Hilal.

- (Saudi Arabia) Hasan Sultan (1957–58)
- (Saudi Arabia) Al Toom Jobarat Allah (1959–60)
- (Sudan) Ashour Salem (1960)
- (England) George Smith (1976–78)
- (Brazil) Paulo Amaral (1978)
- (Brazil) Mário Zagallo (1978–79)
- (Brazil) Olten Filho (1981–82)
- (Hungary) László Kubala (1982–84)
- (Socialist Federal Republic of Yugoslavia) Ljubiša Broćić (1984)
- (Brazil) Valdir Espinosa (1984–85)
- (Brazil) Candinho (1985, 1988–89, Jan 12, 2006–Mar 23, 2006)
- (Brazil) Noagira (1986)
- (Brazil) Rubens Minelli (1987)
- (Uruguay) Omar Borras (1988)
- (Brazil) João Carlos (1989)
- (Brazil) Joel Santana (1989–90)
- (Brazil) Edson Tavares (1990–91)
- (Brazil) Cedinho (1991–92)
- (Brazil) Sebastião Lazaroni (1992–93, 1995)
- (Brazil) José Oscar Bernardi (1993, 1995, 1997, 2004)
- (Brazil) Nelsinho Baptista (1993–94)
- (Brazil) Antônio Lopes (1994)
- (Netherlands) Willem van Hanegem (1995–96)
- (Brazil) Joubert (1996)
- (Croatia) Mirko Jozić (1996–97)
- (Brazil) Heron Ferreira (1997)
- (Romania) Ilie Balaci (1997–98)
- (Germany) Reiner Hollmann (1999)
- (Saudi Arabia) Khalil Al-Zayani (1999)
- (Brazil) Lori Sandri (1999)
- (Romania) Anghel Iordănescu (1999–00)
- (Romania) Ilie Balaci (2000–01)
- (Bosnia and Herzegovina) Safet Sušić (2001)
- (Portugal) Artur Jorge (2001–02)
- (Colombia) Francisco Maturana (2002)
- (Romania) Ilie Balaci (2002–03)
- (Netherlands) Aad de Mos (2003–04)
- (Tunisia) Ahmed Alajlani (2004)
- (Brazil) Marcos Paquetá (July 1, 2004–Dec 19, 2005, Mar 31, 2007–May 30, 2007)
- (Brazil) Jose Kléber (Mar 24, 2006–May 28, 2006)
- (Portugal) José Peseiro (May 29, 2006–Jan 8, 2007)
- (Brazil) Toninho Cerezo (Jan 30, 2007–Mar 29, 2007)
- (Romania) Cosmin Olăroiu (July 1, 2007–Feb 28, 2009)
- (Romania) Catalin Necula (interim) (Feb 28, 2009–Mar 19, 2009)
- (Belgium) Georges Leekens (Apr 1, 2009–May 3, 2009)
- (Belgium) Eric Gerets (Jul 1, 2009–Nov 13, 2010)
- (Argentina) Gabriel Calderon (Nov 14, 2010–June 30, 2011)
- (Germany) Thomas Doll (July 22, 2011–Jan 20, 2012)
- (Germany) Heiko Bonan (interim) (Jan 21, 2012–Jan 30, 2012)
- (Czech Republic) Ivan Hašek (Jan 31, 2012–June 26, 2012)
- (France) Antoine Kombouaré (June 27, 2012–Jan 30, 2013)
- (Croatia) Zlatko Dalić (Jan 31, 2013–May 27, 2013)
- (Saudi Arabia) Sami Al-Jaber (May 28, 2013–May 26, 2014)
- (Romania) Laurențiu Reghecampf (May 27, 2014–Feb 15, 2015)
- (Romania) Marius Ciprian (interim) (Feb 16, 2015–Feb 28, 2015)
- (Greece) Georgios Donis (Mar 1, 2015–May 18, 2016)
- (Saudi Arabia) Abdullatif Al-Hussaini (interim) (May 18, 2016–Jun 11, 2016)
- (Uruguay) Gustavo Matosas (Jun 12, 2016–Sep 22, 2016)
- (Romania) Marius Ciprian (interim) (Sep 22, 2016–Oct 15, 2016)
- (Argentina) Ramón Díaz (Oct 15, 2016–Feb 21, 2018)
- (Argentina) Juan Brown (interim) (Feb 21, 2018–Jun 1, 2018)
- (Portugal) Jorge Jesus (Jun 5, 2018–Jan 31, 2019,
- (Croatia) Zoran Mamić (Jan 31, 2019–Apr 27, 2019)
- (Brazil) Péricles Chamusca (Apr 27, 2019–Jun 30, 2019)
- (Romania) Razvan Lucescu (Jun 30, 2019–Feb 14, 2021)
- (Brazil) Rogério Micale (Feb 14, 2021–May 3 2021)
- (Portugal) Leonardo Jardim (June 2, 2021–Feb 14 2022)
- (Argentina) Ramón Díaz 2nd time managing (Feb 14 2022 – May 15 2023)
- (Argentina) Emiliano Díaz (Interim) (May 15– June 30 2023)
- (Portugal) Jorge Jesus 2nd time managing (July 1 2023 - May 3 2025)
- (Italy) Simone Inzaghi (June 4 2025 - Present)
