= Agustín Valido =

Argentine footballer

Valido
Personal information
- Full name: Agustín Valido
- Date of birth: January 31, 1914
- Place of birth: Buenos Aires, Argentina
- Date of death: February 23, 1998 (aged 84)
- Position: Forward

Senior career*
Years	Team	Apps	(Gls)
1934	Boca Juniors	2	(0)
1934–1937	Lanús	44	(2)
1937–1944	Flamengo	107	(40)
- * Club domestic league appearances and goals

Agustín Valido (January 31, 1914 – February 23, 1998) was an Argentine football forward, who played in several Argentine and Brazilian top-level clubs.

== Career ==
Born in Buenos Aires, Agustín Valido was part of the squad that won Primera División Argentina in 1934 while playing for Boca Juniors. He moved to Lanús in 1935, leaving the club in 1937. He traveled to Brazil in 1937, playing for a combined team named Becar Varella and attracting the attention of Flamengo's board of directors, who signed him. He played 138 games for the Rio de Janeiro club, scoring 44 goals, including one against Vasco in 1944, giving Flamengo their third consecutive state championship.

== Honors ==
=== Club ===
Boca Juniors

- Primera División Argentina: 1934

Flamengo

- Campeonato Carioca: 1942, 1943, 1944
