= Jayme Valente =

Brazilian footballer

Personal information
- Full name: Jayme Pimenta Valente Filho
- Date of birth: 20 June 1942 (age 84)
- Place of birth: Rio de Janeiro, Brazil
- Position: Defender

Youth career
- 1959–1964: Flamengo

Senior career*
Years	Team	Apps	(Gls)
1960–1969	Flamengo	163	(0)
1968	→ Bahia (loan)		

Managerial career
- 1977–1978: Flamengo
- 1978: America-RJ
- 1979–1980: Brazil Olympic
- 1983: Morocco
- 1988–1989: Morocco
- * Club domestic league appearances and goals as of 25 June 2024

Jayme Pimenta Valente Filho (born 20 June 1942), better known as Jayme Valente, is a Brazilian former professional footballer and manager, who played as a defender.

== Playing career ==
Initially a volleyball player at Clube Sirio in Rio de Janeiro, he joined Flamengo's amateur ranks in 1959, making occasional appearances in the main team. In 1964 he was promoted definitively and made 163 appearances for Flamengo, in addition to being one of the main players in winning the state championship in 1965.

== Managerial career ==
As a coach, he had notable spells at Flamengo, America-RJ, Brazil Olympic and the Morocco national team.

== Honours ==
=== Player ===
Flamengo

- Campeonato Carioca: 1965
