= Washington Rodrigues =

Brazilian journalist (1936–2024)

Apolinho
Personal information
- Full name: Washington Carlos Nunes Rodrigues
- Date of birth: 1 September 1936
- Place of birth: Rio de Janeiro, Brazil
- Date of death: 15 May 2024 (aged 87)
- Place of death: Rio de Janeiro, Brazil

Managerial career
- Years: Team
- 1995: Flamengo

Washington Carlos Nunes Rodrigues (1 September 1936 – 15 May 2024), also known as Apolinho, was a Brazilian radio football color commentator, who was notable for working for Super Rádio Tupi. He received the nickname Apolinho (English: Little Apolo) due to his coverage of the man's landing on the Moon with the Apollo missions.

== Coaching career ==
A lifelong fan of Flamengo, Apolinho replaced Edinho and took over Flamengo as a manager in September 1995 coaching players like Edmundo, captain Romário and Sávio. He was considered the most popular football radio commentator in Rio de Janeiro at the time and his appointment by Flamengo chairman Kléber Leite came as a surprise as he had never coached a team before.

Regarding his tenure as coach of Flamengo, Apolinho stated:

"I'm not a coach and I've never been, but Flamengo did not invite me, they summoned me. And every time they call me I will go, for Flamengo I would do anything, if the goalkeeper gets hurt and they need me on the goal I will go there and play, for Flamengo I would do anything, if called I'm in, anything they want, I will go."

His first game in charge was against Vélez Sarsfield guiding Flamengo to a 3-2 victory in the 1995 Copa Libertadores. Apolinho stayed at the club until the end of the 1995 season, with Flamengo finishing 21st with 24 points, but avoiding relegation. Joel Santana replaced him in the following season.

== Death ==
Rodrigues died in Rio de Janeiro on 15 May 2024, at the age of 87.

== See also ==
- List of Clube de Regatas do Flamengo managers
