= Narciso Doval =

Argentine footballer

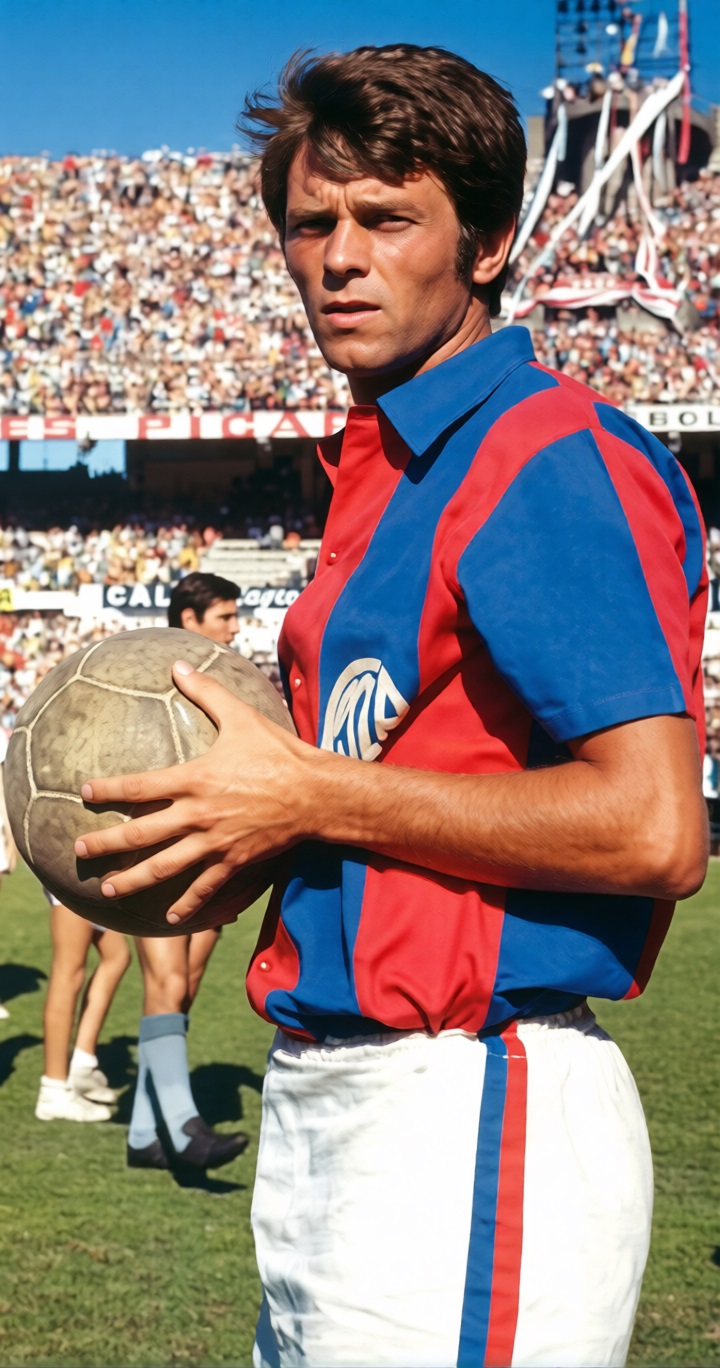

Personal information
- Full name: Narciso Horácio Doval
- Date of birth: 4 January 1944
- Place of birth: Buenos Aires, Argentina
- Date of death: 12 October 1991 (aged 47)
- Place of death: Buenos Aires, Argentina
- Positions: Forward; winger

Youth career
- 1953–1954: San Lorenzo

Senior career*
Years	Team	Apps	(Gls)
1962–1968	San Lorenzo	90	(30)
1968	→ Elche (loan)	2	(0)
1969–1975	Flamengo	84	(18)
1971	→ Huracán (loan)	29	(5)
1976–1978	Fluminense	35	(16)
1979	San Lorenzo	22	(10)
1980	Cleveland Cobras	4	(2)
1980	New York United	14	(10)

International career
1967	Argentina	1	(0)
- * Club domestic league appearances and goals

Narciso Horácio Doval (4 January 1944 - 12 October 1991) was an Argentine footballer.

== Early life ==
Known by is nickname El Loco Doval, he was born in Buenos Aires. Playing in the hole, as a winger or as a forward, Doval was a success. He had good technical ability, and could score and create opportunities for a centre forward. His style made him an idol in every club he played for, but especially in Rio de Janeiro rivals Flamengo and Fluminense. He scored 95 goals in 263 matches for Flamengo, and 68 goals in 142 matches for Fluminense. Zico said that he was one of the best attacking partners he ever had. Doval participated in Garrincha's farewell match at the Maracanã Stadium in 1973. In 1980, he played a single season with the Cleveland Cobras and New York United in the American Soccer League. He was traded from Cleveland in mid-season for American-born Joey Fink.

In 1991, after winning a Supercopa Libertadores match against Estudiantes de la Plata, Flamengo's players met Doval and they went together to a night club in Buenos Aires. During the celebration he suffered a fatal heart attack at age 47.

== Honours ==
Flamengo

- Rio State Championship: 1972, 1974
- Taça Guanabara: 1972, 1973

Fluminense

- Rio State Championship: 1976

== Achievements ==
- Rio State Championship's top scorer: 1972, 1976
