= Telefone (footballer) =

Brazilian footballer (1901–?)

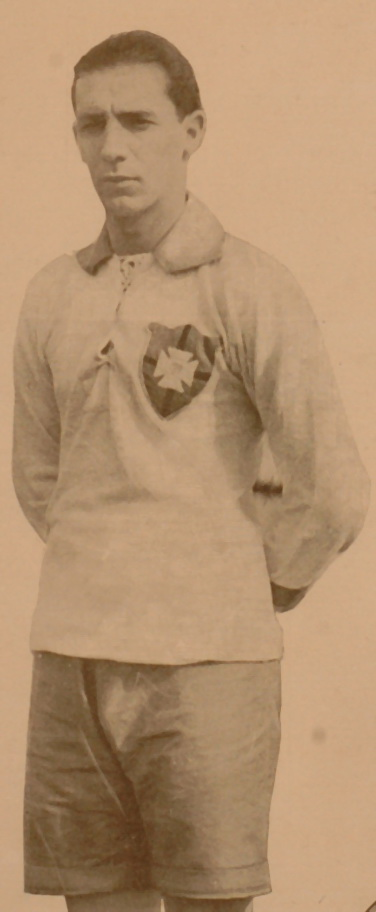
- Telefone in 1921

Personal information
- Date of birth: 21 July 1901
- Position: Defender

Senior career*
Years	Team	Apps	(Gls)
1917–1925	Flamengo	111	(3)

International career
1920–1921	Brazil	5	(0)
- * Club domestic league appearances and goals

José de Almeida Neto, known as Telefone, (born 21 July 1901, date of death unknown) was a Brazilian footballer who played as a defender. He made five appearances for the Brazil national team in 1920 and 1921. He was also part of Brazil's squad for the 1920 South American Championship.
