= Joubert (footballer) =

Brazilian footballer (born 1935)

Personal information
- Full name: Joubert Luís Meira
- Date of birth: 14 June 1935 (age 91)
- Place of birth: Tombos, Brazil
- Position: Defender

Senior career*
Years	Team	Apps	(Gls)
1954	Tombense		
1955–1964	Flamengo	369	(0)

Managerial career
- 1969: Flamengo
- 1972: Flamengo
- 1973: Flamengo
- 1974–1975: Flamengo
- 1976: Remo
- 1977–1978: Remo
- 1978: Flamengo
- 1978: Remo
- 1983–1984: Al Ittihad
- 1985: Flamengo
- 1986–1987: Al Shabab
- * Club domestic league appearances and goals as of 24 March 2024

Joubert Luís Meira (born 14 June 1935), simply known as Joubert, is a Brazilian former professional footballer and manager, who played as a defender.

== Career ==
Born in Tombos, Minas Gerais, Joubert began his career at Tombense. He then played for Flamengo, from 1955 to 1964, making 369 appearances and being state champion in 1955 and 1963, in addition to the Rio-São Paulo Tournament in 1961.

== Managerial career ==
Joubert was Flamengo's manager on several occasions, in addition to being a technical assistant to other big names such as Mário Zagallo. He was state champion in 1974, and also had spells at Clube do Remo, where he won the Pará state title in 1978. He was coach of Al-Ittihad and Al-Shabab in Saudi Arabia during the 1980s.

== Honours ==
=== Player ===
Flamengo

- Campeonato Carioca: 1955, 1963
- Torneio Rio-São Paulo: 1961

=== Manager ===
Flamengo

- Campeonato Carioca: 1974

Remo

- Campeonato Paraense: 1978
