= Carlinhos (footballer, born 1937) =

Brazilian footballer and manager

Personal information
- Full name: Luís Carlos Nunes da Silva
- Date of birth: 19 November 1937
- Place of birth: Rio de Janeiro, Brazil
- Date of death: 22 June 2015 (aged 77)
- Place of death: Rio de Janeiro, Brazil
- Height: 1.78 m (5 ft 10 in)
- Position: Defensive midfielder

Senior career*
Years	Team	Apps	(Gls)
1958–1969	Flamengo	204	(9)

International career
1964	Brazil	1	(0)

Managerial career
- 1983: Flamengo
- 1987: Flamengo
- 1987–1988: Flamengo
- 1991–1993: Flamengo
- 1993: Guarani
- 1994: Flamengo
- 1999: Flamengo
- 2000: Flamengo
- * Club domestic league appearances and goals

Luís Carlos Nunes da Silva, nicknamed Carlinhos (19 November 1937 – 22 June 2015), played for Flamengo between 1958 and 1969. Because of his elegant football and his thin voice, he was known as "The Violin". In Flamengo, he won the 1961 Torneio Rio-São Paulo and twice the Rio State Championship (1963 and 1965).

Carlinhos was capped for the Brazil national team several times in the 1960s.

He was one of the few players to receive the Belfort Duarte Trophy ("fair play award") from the Brazilian Football Confederation (CBF). The award is given to the players who have never received a red card.

His career as a manager started in 1983, when he coached Flamengo for five matches. Four years later, he was back at Flamengo when former coach Antônio Lopes was fired for the bad results in the 1987 Rio State Championship finals. At that time, Flamengo's squad had Brazilian star Renato Gaúcho, veteran players (such as Zico, Leandro, Andrade, Nunes and Edinho), and young ones, that had just came from the youth squad. Zico, the main star of the club, still recovering from several knee surgeries, wasn't at his top form. Carlinhos, with a little luck and much knowledge of the ways of the football, mixed veterans and newcomers to create a very competitive team, that won the 1987 Copa União. Five World Champions in the 1994 World Cup played for that team: Bebeto, Zinho, Aldair, Jorginho and Leonardo.

Carlinhos returned in 1991, in similar conditions. His squad had Júnior, near retirement, Zinho and many newbies (among them Djalminha and Marcelinho). After winning 1991 Rio State Championship, he won the fifth Brazilian National Championship for Flamengo in the 1992 finals against Botafogo (3–0, 2–2).

He won another important title for Flamengo in 1999, the Mercosur Cup.

As professional he disputed 880 matches: 517 as player and 313 as coach.

On 12 February 2011, he was honored for Flamengo, with the unveiling of a bust and a square at the headquarters of the club. Carlinhos died on 22 June 2015.

== Honours ==
=== Player ===
==== Flamengo ====
- Torneio Rio–São Paulo: 1961
- Campeonato Carioca: 1963, 1965

=== Manager ===
==== Flamengo ====
- Copa Mercosur: 1999
- Campeonato Brasileiro Série A: 1992
- Copa União: 1987
- Campeonato Carioca: 1991, 1999, 2000
