= Modesto Bria =

Paraguayan footballer and manager (1922-1996)

Bria
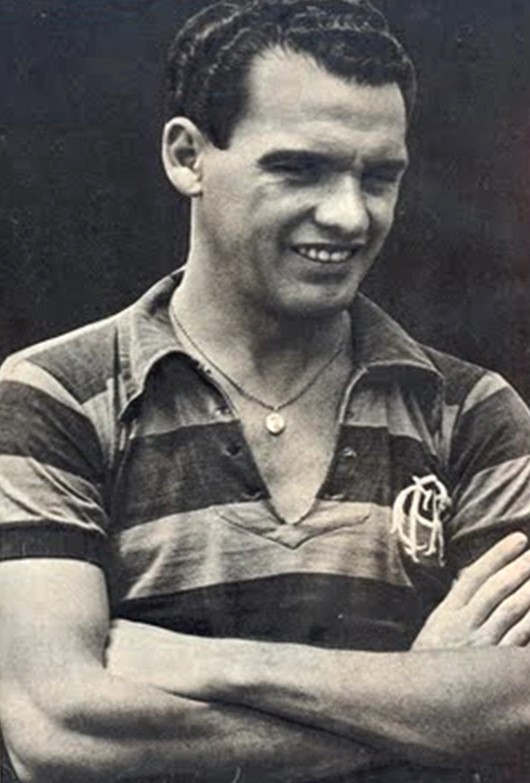
- Bría in 1944

Personal information
- Full name: Modesto Bria
- Date of birth: 8 March 1922
- Place of birth: Encarnación, Paraguay
- Date of death: 30 August 1996 (aged 74)
- Place of death: Rio de Janeiro, Brazil
- Position: Defensive midfielder

Youth career
- 1938–1939: Nacional

Senior career*
| Years | Team | Apps | (Gls) |
| 1939–1943 | Nacional | | |
| 1943–1953 | Flamengo | 136 | (5) |
| 1953–1954 | Santa Cruz | 10 | (0) |

Managerial career
- 1959–1960: Flamengo
- 1967: Flamengo
- 1981: Flamengo
- * Club domestic league appearances and goals

Modesto "Cachito" Bria (8 March 1922 – 30 August 1996) was a Paraguayan football midfielder and manager.

== Honours ==
=== Club ===
Nacional

- Primera División: 1942

Flamengo

- Campeonato Carioca: 1943, 1944, 1953
