= 2024 Campeonato Carioca =

Campeonato Carioca
- Season: 2024
- Dates: 17 January - 7 April 2024
- Champions: Flamengo (38th title)
- Relegated: Audax Rio
- Copa do Brasil: Boavista; Fluminense; Nova Iguaçu; Portuguesa; Vasco da Gama
- Série D: Boavista; Nova Iguaçu
- Matches: 72
- Goals: 181 (2.51 per match)
- Top goalscorer: Pedro (11 goals)

The 2024 Campeonato Carioca de Futebol (officially the Campeonato Carioca Betnacional 2024 for sponsorship reasons) was the 121st edition of the top division of football in the state of Rio de Janeiro. The competition was organized by FERJ. It began on 17 January 2024 and ended on 7 April 2024. The defending champions were Fluminense. Flamengo won the competition for the 38th time.

== Participating teams ==
Location of teams in 2024 Campeonato Carioca
Location of teams in 2024 Campeonato Carioca – city of Rio de Janeiro

Club	Home city (Note: Some clubs sold their home field advantage for some of their games to third parties, which means that some games were played in different states)	Head coach	2023 result
Audax Rio de Janeiro Esporte Clube	Saquarema	Luciano Quadros	6th
Bangu Atlético Clube	Rio de Janeiro (Bangu)	França	9th
Boavista Sport Club	Saquarema	Filipe Cândido	11th
Botafogo de Futebol e Regatas	Rio de Janeiro (Engenho de Dentro) (Note: Although Botafogo FR is headquartered in Botafogo, it plays home games at Engenhão Stadium)	Tiago Nunes and Fábio Matias (interim)	5th
Clube de Regatas do Flamengo	Rio de Janeiro (Maracanã) (Note: Although CR Flamengo is headquartered in Lagoa, it plays home games at Maracanã Stadium)	Tite	2nd
Fluminense Football Club	Rio de Janeiro (Maracanã) (Note: Although Fluminense FC is headquartered in Laranjeiras, it plays home games at Maracanã Stadium)	Fernando Diniz	1st
Madureira Esporte Clube	Rio de Janeiro (Madureira)	Daniel Neri and Josicler Oliveira	10th
Nova Iguaçu Futebol Clube	Nova Iguaçu	Carlos Vitor	7th
Associação Atlética Portuguesa	Rio de Janeiro (Governador Island)	João Carlos Ângelo, Carlos Tozzi (interim) and Caio Couto	8th
Sampaio Corrêa Futebol e Esporte	Saquarema	Silvestre dos Anjos and Alfredo Sampaio	1st (Série A2)
Club de Regatas Vasco da Gama	Rio de Janeiro (Vasco da Gama)	Ramón Díaz	3rd
Volta Redonda Futebol Clube	Volta Redonda	Felipe Loureiro and Rogério Corrêa	4th

== Format ==
In the main competition, the twelve clubs played each other in a single round-robin. This round-robin was the Taça Guanabara. The bottom team was relegated to the 2024 Série A2. While the top four clubs qualified for the final stage, the next four clubs (5th to 8th places) qualified for the Taça Rio. In the Taça Rio, the 5th-placed club faced the 8th-placed club, and the 6th-placed will face the 7th-placed. In the final stage, the winners of the Taça Guanabara faced the 4th-placed club, while the runners-up faced the 3rd-placed club. In both of these four-team brackets (the Taça Rio and the final stage), the semi-finals and finals were played over two legs, without the use of the away goals rule. In the semi-finals of both the Taça Rio and the final stage, the higher placed teams on the Taça Guanabara table advanced in case of an aggregate tie. In the finals of both brackets, there was no such advantage; in case of an aggregate tie, a penalty shoot-out would have taken place.

The top four teams of the Campeonato Carioca and the winner of the Taça Rio qualified for the 2025 Copa do Brasil. Since Botafogo and Flamengo qualified for the 2025 Copa do Brasil via winning the 2024 Copa Libertadores and 2024 Copa do Brasil respectively, their Campeonato Carioca berths went to the next best team. The top two teams of the Campeonato Carioca that were not already playing in the Campeonato Brasileiro Série A, Série B or Série C qualified for the 2025 Série D.

== Taça Guanabara ==
Pos	Team	Pld	W	D	L	GF	GA	GD	Pts	Qualification
1	Flamengo (C)	11	8	3	0	23	1	+22	27	Taça Guanabara Champion and advance to semifinals
2	Nova Iguaçu	11	7	3	1	18	13	+5	24	Advance to semifinals
3	Vasco da Gama	11	6	4	1	20	10	+10	22	Advance to semifinals
4	Fluminense	11	6	3	2	17	11	+6	21	Advance to semifinals
5	Botafogo	11	6	2	3	19	11	+8	20	Advance to Taça Rio semifinals
6	Boavista	11	5	3	3	18	21	−3	18	Advance to Taça Rio semifinals
7	Portuguesa	11	3	5	3	9	12	−3	14	Advance to Taça Rio semifinals
8	Sampaio Corrêa	11	3	1	7	14	17	−3	10	Advance to Taça Rio semifinals
9	Madureira	11	3	1	7	9	13	−4	10	
10	Volta Redonda	11	2	3	6	12	19	−7	9	
11	Bangu	11	2	2	7	12	24	−12	8	
12	Audax Rio (R)	11	0	0	11	1	20	−19	0	Relegated

Source: FERJ
Rules for classification: 1) points; 2) wins; 3) goal difference; 4) goals scored; 5) head-to-head results; 6) disciplinary record; 7) random draw.
(C) Champions; (R) Relegated

2024 Taça Guanabara champions
Flamengo
24th title

== Taça Rio ==
Semi-finals
7	Portuguesa	1	2	3
6	Boavista	1	3	4
8	Sampaio Corrêa	1	1	2
5	Botafogo	2	2	4

Finals
6	Boavista	0	0	0
5	Botafogo	4	2	6

2024 Taça Rio champions
Botafogo
9th title

== Final stage ==
Semi-finals
3	Vasco da Gama	1	0	1
2	Nova Iguaçu	1	1	2
4	Fluminense	0	0	0
1	Flamengo	2	0	2

Finals
2	Nova Iguaçu	0	0	0
1	Flamengo	3	1	4

=== Semi-finals ===
==== Group A ====
9 March 2024
21:00

Fluminense	0–2	Flamengo
	Report	Everton 45+2'; Pedro 90+4'

Maracanã, Rio de Janeiro
Attendance: 52,169
Referee: Yuri Elino Ferreira da Cruz

16 March 2024
21:00

Flamengo	0–0	Fluminense
	Report

Maracanã, Rio de Janeiro
Attendance: 56,261
Referee: Wagner do Nascimento Magalhães

==== Group B ====
10 March 2024
18:30

Vasco da Gama	1–1	Nova Iguaçu
Piton 82'	Report	Xandinho 50'

Maracanã, Rio de Janeiro
Attendance: 61,425
Referee: Alex Gomes Stefano

17 March 2024
16:00

Nova Iguaçu	1–0	Vasco da Gama
Bill 75'	Report

Maracanã, Rio de Janeiro
Attendance: 60,429
Referee: Yuri Elino Ferreira da Cruz

=== Finals ===
==== First leg ====
30 March 2024
17:00

Nova Iguaçu	0–3	Flamengo
	Report	Pedro 30' (pen.), 53'; Ronald 80' (o.g.)

Maracanã, Rio de Janeiro
Attendance: 43,778
Referee: Alex Gomes Stefano

Nova Iguaçu	Flamengo

GK	1	(Brazil) Fabrício Santana
RB	4	(Brazil) Yan Silva		(substituted off) 88'
CB	6	(Brazil) Sérgio Raphael		(substituted off) 75'
CB	2	(Brazil) Gabriel Pinheiro (c)
LB	3	(Brazil) Maicon		(substituted off) 64'
DM	8	(Brazil) Albert	(yellow card) 19'
DM	5	(Brazil) Igor Guilherme	(yellow card) 34'	(substituted off) 63'
AM	11	(Brazil) Yago Ferreira
RW	7	(Brazil) Xandinho		(substituted off) 63'
ST	9	(Brazil) Carlinhos
LW	10	(Brazil) Bill
Substitutes:
GK	12	(Brazil) Caio Borges
GK	31	(Brazil) Matheus Miranda
DM	13	(Brazil) Sidney Pages		(substituted in) 64'
CB	14	(Brazil) Matheus Matias		(substituted in) 88'
DM	15	(Brazil) Fernandinho		(substituted in) 63'
DM	16	(Brazil) Ronald		(substituted in) 75'
AM	17	(Brazil) João Victor
LW	18	(Brazil) Alegria		(substituted in) 63'
ST	19	(Brazil) Marllon
RW	20	(Brazil) Lucas Campos
AM	21	(Brazil) Lucas Cruz
RW	22	(Brazil) Emerson Carioca
Head coach:
(Brazil) Carlos Vitor

GK	1	(Argentina) Agustín Rossi
RB	2	(Uruguay) Guillermo Varela	(yellow card) 22'
CB	15	(Brazil) Fabrício Bruno
CB	4	(Brazil) Léo Pereira
LB	6	(Brazil) Ayrton Lucas
DM	5	(Chile) Erick Pulgar	(yellow card) 58'	(substituted off) 74'
CM	18	(Uruguay) Nicolás de la Cruz		(substituted off) 63'
AM	14	(Uruguay) Giorgian de Arrascaeta		(substituted off) 83'
RW	7	(Brazil) Luiz Araújo		(substituted off) 83'
ST	9	(Brazil) Pedro
LW	11	(Brazil) Everton		(substituted off) 74'
Substitutes:
GK	25	(Brazil) Matheus Cunha
CB	3	(Brazil) Léo Ortiz
LB	17	(Uruguay) Matías Viña
AM	19	(Brazil) Lorran
AM	20	(Brazil) Matheus Gonçalves		(substituted in) 83'
DM	21	(Brazil) Allan		(substituted in) 63'
CB	23	(Brazil) David Luiz
LW	27	(Brazil) Bruno Henrique		(substituted in) 74'
CM	29	(Brazil) Victor Hugo		(substituted in) 83'
CB	33	(Brazil) Cleiton
DM	48	(Brazil) Igor Jesus		(substituted in) 74'
CM	52	(Brazil) Evertton Araújo
Head coach:
(Brazil) Tite

Man of the match:
Pedro (Flamengo)
Assistant referees:
Thiago Henrique Neto Corrêa
Thiago Rosa de Oliveira Esposito
Fourth official:
Rafael Martins de Sá
Video assistant referee:
Rodrigo Carvalhaes de Miranda

Match rules

- 90 minutes.
- Twelve named substitutes.
- Maximum of five substitutions.

==== Second leg ====
7 April 2024
17:00

Flamengo	1–0	Nova Iguaçu
Bruno Henrique 74'	Report

Maracanã, Rio de Janeiro
Attendance: 65,757
Referee: Bruno Mota Correia

Flamengo	Nova Iguaçu

GK	1	(Argentina) Agustín Rossi
RB	2	(Uruguay) Guillermo Varela		(substituted off) 82'
CB	15	(Brazil) Fabrício Bruno
CB	4	(Brazil) Léo Pereira	(yellow card) 58'
LB	6	(Brazil) Ayrton Lucas
DM	5	(Chile) Erick Pulgar	(yellow card) 58'	(substituted off) 82'
CM	18	(Uruguay) Nicolás de la Cruz		(substituted off) 83'
AM	14	(Uruguay) Giorgian de Arrascaeta		(substituted off) 71'
RW	7	(Brazil) Luiz Araújo	(yellow card) 84'
ST	9	(Brazil) Pedro
LW	11	(Brazil) Everton		(substituted off) 71'
Substitutes:
GK	25	(Brazil) Matheus Cunha
CB	3	(Brazil) Léo Ortiz
LB	17	(Uruguay) Matías Viña
AM	19	(Brazil) Lorran
AM	20	(Brazil) Matheus Gonçalves
DM	21	(Brazil) Allan		(substituted in) 71'
CB	23	(Brazil) David Luiz
LW	27	(Brazil) Bruno Henrique		(substituted in) 71'
CM	29	(Brazil) Victor Hugo		(substituted in) 83'
CB	33	(Brazil) Cleiton
DM	48	(Brazil) Igor Jesus		(substituted in) 82'
CM	52	(Brazil) Evertton Araújo		(substituted in) 82'
Head coach:
(Brazil) Tite

GK	1	(Brazil) Fabrício Santana
RB	4	(Brazil) Yan Silva		(substituted off) 83'
CB	6	(Brazil) Sérgio Raphael	(yellow card) 56'
CB	2	(Brazil) Gabriel Pinheiro (c)
LB	3	(Brazil) Maicon
DM	8	(Brazil) Albert
DM	5	(Brazil) Igor Guilherme		(substituted off) 83'
AM	11	(Brazil) Yago Ferreira		(substituted off) 46'
RW	7	(Brazil) Xandinho
ST	19	(Brazil) Marllon		(substituted off) 66'
LW	10	(Brazil) Bill		(substituted off) 15'
Substitutes:
GK	12	(Brazil) Caio Borges
GK	31	(Brazil) Matheus Miranda
ST	9	(Brazil) Carlinhos
DM	13	(Brazil) Sidney Pages
CB	14	(Brazil) Matheus Matias
DM	15	(Brazil) Fernandinho		(substituted in) 83'
DM	16	(Brazil) Ronald		(substituted in) 83'
AM	17	(Brazil) João Victor		(substituted in) 66'
LW	18	(Brazil) Alegria
RW	20	(Brazil) Lucas Campos	(yellow card) 31'	(substituted in) 15'
AM	21	(Brazil) Lucas Cruz	(yellow card) 58'	(substituted in) 46'
RW	22	(Brazil) Emerson Carioca
Head coach:
(Brazil) Carlos Vitor

Assistant referees:
Rodrigo Figueiredo Henrique Correa
Luiz Cláudio Regazzoni
Fourth official:
Gazianni Maciel Rocha
Video assistant referee:
Rodrigo Carvalhaes de Miranda

Match rules

- 90 minutes.
- Twelve named substitutes.
- Maximum of five substitutions.

2024 Campeonato Carioca champions
Flamengo
38th title

== Top goalscorers ==
Rank	Player	Team	Goals
1	(Brazil) Pedro	Flamengo	11
2	(Brazil) Carlinhos	Nova Iguaçu	8
3	(Brazil) Matheus Lucas	Boavista	6
3	(Brazil) Lelê	Fluminense	6
4	(Brazil) Max	Sampaio Corrêa	5
5	(Brazil) MV	Volta Redonda	4
5	(Brazil) Marcelo	Sampaio Corrêa	4
5	(Argentina) Pablo Vegetti	Vasco da Gama	4
