= 2020 CR Flamengo season =

Flamengo
2020 season
- President: Rodolfo Landim
- Head coach: Jorge Jesus (until 17 July 2020); Domènec Torrent (31 July 2020 – 8 November 2020); Rogério Ceni (since 10 November 2020)
- Stadium: Estádio do Maracanã
- Série A: Winners
- Campeonato Carioca: Winners
- Copa do Brasil: Quarterfinals
- Supercopa do Brasil: Winners
- Copa Libertadores: Round of 16
- Recopa Sudamericana: Winners
- Top goalscorer: League: Gabriel Barbosa (14 goals); All: Gabriel Barbosa (27 goals)
- Highest home attendance: 69,986 (26 February vs. Independiente del Valle)
- Lowest home attendance: 22,724 (25 January vs. Volta Redonda)
- Average home league attendance: No league attendance
Home colours	Away colours	Third colours

The 2020 season is Clube de Regatas do Flamengo's 125th year of existence, their 109th football season, and their 50th in the Brazilian Série A, having never been relegated from the top division. In addition to the 2020 Campeonato Brasileiro Série A, Flamengo also competed in the CONMEBOL Copa Libertadores, the Copa do Brasil, and the Campeonato Carioca, the top tier of Rio de Janeiro's state football league, Supercopa do Brasil and Recopa Sudamericana.

== Kits ==
Supplier: Adidas / Sponsor: Banco BRB / Back of the shirt: MRV / Lower back: Total / Shoulder: Sportsbet.io / Numbers: TIM / Shorts: Azeite Royal / Socks: Orthopride

Home	Home alternate	Away	Away alternate	Third
Goalkeeper	Goalkeeper alternate	Goalkeeper alternate 2	Goalkeeper alternate 3

== Competitions ==
=== Overview ===
Competition	First match	Last match	Starting round	Final position	Record							
Competition	First match	Last match	Starting round	Final position	Pld	W	D	L	GF	GA	GD	Win %
Série A	9 August 2020	25 February 2021	Matchday 1	Winners	38	21	8	9	68	48	+20	55.26
Copa do Brasil	28 October 2020	18 November 2020	Round of 16	Quarter-finals	4	2	0	2	5	7	−2	50.00
Campeonato Carioca	18 January 2020	15 July 2020	Matchday 1	Winners	17	14	2	1	34	11	+23	82.35
Copa Libertadores	4 March 2020	1 December 2020	Group stage	Round of 16	8	5	2	1	16	10	+6	62.50
Supercopa do Brasil	16 February 2020		Final	Winners	1	1	0	0	3	0	+3	100.00
Recopa Sudamericana	19 February 2020	26 February 2020	Final	Winners	2	1	1	0	5	2	+3	50.00
Total					70	44	13	13	131	78	+53	62.86

Last updated: 25 February 2021
Source: Competitions

=== Supercopa do Brasil ===
Goals and red cards are shown.

16 February 2020 Final	Flamengo	3–0	Athletico Paranaense	Brasília
11:00 UTC−3	Bruno Henrique 15'; Gabriel 29' de Arrascaeta 68'	Report		Stadium: Estádio Nacional Mané Garrincha; Attendance: 48.009; Referee: Wilton Sampaio

=== Recopa Sudamericana ===
Goals and red cards are shown.

19 February 2020 Final (1st leg)	Independiente del Valle (Ecuador)	2–2	(Brazil) Flamengo	Quito, Ecuador
20:30 UTC−5	Murillo 20'; Pellerano 90+1' (pen.)	Report	Bruno Henrique 65'; Pedro 85'	Stadium: Estadio Olímpico Atahualpa; Attendance: 22,052; Referee: Leodán González (Uruguay)

26 February 2020 Final (2nd leg)	Flamengo (Brazil)	3–0 (5–2 agg.)	(Ecuador) Independiente del Valle	Rio de Janeiro, Brazil
21:30 UTC−3	Gabriel 19'; Arão (red card) 23'; Gerson 62', 89'	Report	Cabeza (red card) 86'	Stadium: Estádio do Maracanã; Attendance: 69,986; Referee: Fernando Rapallini (Argentina)

=== Campeonato Carioca ===
==== Taça Guanabara ====
Pos	Team	Pld	W	D	L	GF	GA	GD	Pts	Qualification
1	Boavista (Q)	6	4	1	1	9	3	+6	13	Advance to semifinals
2	Flamengo (Q)	6	4	1	1	9	4	+5	13	Advance to semifinals
3	Botafogo	6	3	0	3	6	8	−2	9	
4	Portuguesa	6	2	0	4	7	9	−2	6	
5	Bangu	6	1	3	2	3	7	−4	6	
6	Cabofriense	6	1	0	5	3	10	−7	3	

Source: FERJ
Rules for classification: 1) points; 2) wins; 3) goal difference; 4) goals scored; 5) head-to-head results; 6) disciplinary record; 7) random draw.
(Q) Qualified

Goals and red cards are shown.

18 January 2020 1	Macaé	0–0	Flamengo	Rio de Janeiro
16:00 UTC−3		Report		Stadium: Maracanã; Attendance: 27,205; Referee: Pathrice Wallace Correa Maia

22 January 2020 2	Vasco da Gama	0–1	Flamengo	Rio de Janeiro
21:00 UTC−3		Report	Silva 28'	Stadium: Maracanã; Attendance: 25,738; Referee: Grazianni Maciel Rocha

25 January 2020 3	Flamengo	3–2	Volta Redonda	Rio de Janeiro
18:00 UTC−3	João Lucas 49'; Muniz 75'; Bill 90'	Report	João Carlos 34'; Saulo Mineiro 87'	Stadium: Maracanã; Attendance: 22,724; Referee: Bruno Arleu de Araújo

29 January 2020 4	Flamengo	0–1	Fluminense	Rio de Janeiro
20:30 UTC−3			Nenê 72'	Stadium: Maracanã; Attendance: 46,669; Referee: Rodrigo Carvalhaes de Miranda

3 February 2020 5	Resende	1–3	Flamengo	Rio de Janeiro
20:00 UTC−3	Alef Manga 65'		Pedro 75'; Gabriel 85'; Bruno Henrique 88'	Stadium: Maracanã; Attendance: 53,681; Referee: Diego da Silva Lourenço

8 February 2020 6	Flamengo	2–0	Madureira	Rio de Janeiro
16:00 UTC−3	Gabriel 61'; Pedro 90+3'			Stadium: Maracanã; Attendance: 64,576; Referee: João Batista de Arruda

12 February 2020 Semi-final	Fluminense	2–3	Flamengo	Rio de Janeiro
20:30 UTC−3	Claro 61'; Evanilson 71'		Bruno Henrique 3'; Gabriel 9'; Filipe Luís 50'	Stadium: Maracanã; Attendance: 59,025; Referee: Grazianni Maciel Rocha

22 February 2020 Final	Boavista	1–2	Flamengo	Rio de Janeiro
18:00 UTC−03:00	Jean 6'	Report	Diego 44'; Gabriel 82'	Stadium: Maracanã; Attendance: 58,219; Referee: Marcelo De Lima Henrique

==== Taça Rio ====
Pos	Team	Pld	W	D	L	GF	GA	GD	Pts	Qualification
1	Flamengo (Q)	5	5	0	0	14	2	+12	15	Advance to semifinals
2	Botafogo (Q)	5	2	2	1	9	7	+2	8	Advance to semifinals
3	Boavista	5	2	1	2	5	5	0	7	
4	Bangu	5	2	1	2	4	6	−2	7	
5	Portuguesa	5	1	2	2	5	4	+1	5	
6	Cabofriense	5	0	0	5	4	17	−13	0	

Source: FERJ
Rules for classification: 1) points; 2) wins; 3) goal difference; 4) goals scored; 5) head-to-head results; 6) disciplinary record; 7) random draw.
(Q) Qualified for the phase indicated

Goals and red cards are shown.

29 February 2020 1	Cabofriense	1–4	Flamengo	Rio de Janeiro
18:00 UTC−3	Gama 25'		Michael 13'; Gabriel 65', 77', 89'	Stadium: Maracanã; Attendance: 28,464; Referee: Alexandre Vargas Tavares de Jesus

7 March 2020 2	Flamengo	3–0	Botafogo	Rio de Janeiro
18:00 UTC−3	Ribeiro 65'; Gabriel 69'; Michael 85'			Stadium: Maracanã; Attendance: 52,544; Referee: Bruno Arleu de Araújo

14 March 2020 3	Flamengo	2–1	Portuguesa	Rio de Janeiro
18:00 UTC−3	Marcão 90' (o.g.); de Arrascaeta 90+3'		Maicon Douglas 59'	Stadium: Maracanã; Attendance: 0 (Note: FERJ announced that Campeonato Carioca matches would be played without public attendance due to the COVID-19 pandemic.); Referee: Mauricio Machado Coelho Junior

18 June 2020 4	Bangu	0–3	Flamengo	Rio de Janeiro
21:00 UTC−3			de Arrascaeta 18'; Bruno Henrique 66'; Rocha 88'	Stadium: Moça Bonita; Attendance: Referee: Wagner do Nascimento Magalhães

1 July 2020 5	Flamengo	2–0	Boavista	Rio de Janeiro
21:30 UTC−3	Pedro 36'; Gerson 51'			Stadium: Maracanã; Attendance: Referee: Rodrigo Nunes de Sà

5 July 2020 Semi-final	Flamengo	2–0	Volta Redonda	Rio de Janeiro
16:00 UTC−3	Bruno Henrique 21', 49'	Report		Stadium: Maracanã; Attendance: Referee: Grazianni Maciel Rocha

8 July 2020 Final	Fluminense	1–1 (3–2 p)	Flamengo	Rio de Janeiro
21:30 UTC−3	Gilberto 37'	Report	Pedro 76'	Stadium: Maracanã; Attendance: Referee: Bruno Arleu de Araújo
	Penalties
	Nenê (penalty scored); Dodi (penalty missed); Hudson (penalty scored); Araújo (penalty missed); Pacheco (penalty scored)		(penalty scored) Gabriel; (penalty missed) Arão; (penalty missed) Pereira; (penalty scored) Pedro; (penalty missed) Rafinha

==== Final stage ====
12 July 2020 1st leg	Fluminense	1–2	Flamengo	Rio de Janeiro
16:00 UTC−3	Evanilson 60'	Report	Pedro 27'; Michael 74'; Gabriel (red card) 90+3'	Stadium: Maracanã; Attendance: Referee: Wagner do Nascimento Magalhães

15 July 2020 2nd leg	Flamengo	1–0	Fluminense	Rio de Janeiro
21:00 UTC−3	Vitinho 90+5'			Stadium: Maracanã; Attendance: Referee: Grazianni Maciel Rocha

=== Copa Libertadores ===
The group stage draw for the 2020 Copa Libertadores was conducted on 17 December 2019.

==== Group stage ====
Pos	Team	Pld	W	D	L	GF	GA	GD	Pts	Qualification	FLA	IDV	JUN	BSC
1	(Brazil) Flamengo	6	5	0	1	14	8	+6	15	Round of 16	—	4–0	3–1	3–0
2	(Ecuador) Independiente del Valle	6	4	0	2	14	8	+6	12	Round of 16	5–0	—	3–0	2–0
3	(Colombia) Junior	6	2	0	4	8	12	−4	6	Copa Sudamericana	1–2	4–1	—	0–2
4	(Ecuador) Barcelona	6	1	0	5	4	12	−8	3		1–2	0–3	1–2	—

Source: CONMEBOL
Rules for classification: 1) Points; 2) Goal difference; 3) Goals scored; 4) Away goals scored; 5) CONMEBOL ranking.

Goals and red cards are shown.

4 March 2020 1	Junior (Colombia)	1–2	(Brazil) Flamengo	Barranquilla, Colombia
19:30 UTC−5	Gutiérrez 90+5'	Report	Ribeiro 6', 79'	Stadium: Estadio Metropolitano Roberto Meléndez; Referee: Alexis Herrera (Venezuela)

11 March 2020 2	Flamengo (Brazil)	3–0	(Ecuador) Barcelona	Rio de Janeiro, Brazil
21:30 UTC−3	Gustavo Henrique 39'; Gabriel 45' (pen.); Bruno Henrique 53'	Report		Stadium: Maracanã; Attendance: 63,426; Referee: Facundo Tello (Argentina)

17 September 2020 3	Independiente del Valle (Ecuador)	5–0	(Brazil) Flamengo	Quito, Ecuador
19:00 UTC−5	M. Caicedo 40'; Preciado 49'; Torres 58'; Sánchez 81'; B. Caicedo 90+2'; Preciado (yellow card) 52' (yellow-red card) 90+3'	Report	Gustavo Henrique (red card) 90+3'	Stadium: La Casa Blanca; Referee: Wilmar Roldan (Colombia)

22 September 2020 4	Barcelona (Ecuador)	1–2	(Brazil) Flamengo	Guayaquil, Ecuador
17:15 UTC−5	L. Martínez 48'	Report	Pedro 6'; de Arrascaeta 26'	Stadium: Estadio Monumental Isidro Romero Carbo; Referee: Diego Haro (Peru)

30 September 2020 5	Flamengo (Brazil)	4–0	(Ecuador) Independiente del Valle	Rio de Janeiro, Brazil
21:30 UTC−3	Lincoln 26'; Pedro 30'; Bruno Henrique 51', 72'	Report		Stadium: Maracanã; Referee: Fernando Rapallini (Argentina)

21 October 2020 6	Flamengo (Brazil)	3–1	(Colombia) Junior	Rio de Janeiro, Brazil
21:30 UTC−3	Thuler 10'; Lincoln 40'; Bruno Henrique 75'	Report	Gutiérrez 69'	Stadium: Maracanã; Referee: Patricio Loustau (Argentina)

==== Round of 16 ====
Goals and red cards are shown.

25 November 2020 1st leg	Racing (Argentina)	1–1	(Brazil) Flamengo	Avellaneda, Argentina
21:30 UTC−3	Fértoli 13'	Report	Gabriel 15'; Thuler (red card) 82'; Natan (red card) 83'	Stadium: El Cilindro; Attendance: 0 Referee: Alexis Herrera (Venezuela)

1 December 2020 2nd leg	Flamengo (Brazil)	1–1 (2–2 agg.) (3–5 p)	(Argentina) Racing	Rio de Janeiro, Brazil
21:30 UTC−3	Arão 90+3'; Rodrigo Caio (yellow card) 27' (yellow-red card) 63'	Report	Sigali 65'	Stadium: Maracanã; Attendance: 0 Referee: Roberto Tobar (Chile)

Tied 2–2 on aggregate, Racing won on penalties and advanced to the quarter-finals

=== Campeonato Brasileiro ===
==== League table ====
Pos	Team	Pld	W	D	L	GF	GA	GD	Pts	Qualification or relegation
1	Flamengo (C)	38	21	8	9	68	48	+20	71	Qualification for Copa Libertadores group stage
2	Internacional	38	20	10	8	61	35	+26	70	Qualification for Copa Libertadores group stage
3	Atlético Mineiro	38	20	8	10	64	45	+19	68	Qualification for Copa Libertadores group stage
4	São Paulo	38	18	12	8	59	41	+18	66	Qualification for Copa Libertadores group stage
5	Fluminense	38	18	10	10	55	42	+13	64	Qualification for Copa Libertadores group stage

Source: CBF
Rules for classification: 1) points; 2) wins; 3) goal difference; 4) goals scored; 5) head-to-head results (only between 2 teams); 6) fewest red cards; 7) fewest yellow cards; 8) draw.
(C) Champions

==== Results by round ====
Round	1	2	3	4	5	6	7	8	9	10	11	12	13	14	15	16	17	18	19	20	21	22	23	24	25	26	27	28	29	30	31	32	33	34	35	36	37	38
Ground	H	A	A	H	H	A	A	H	A	A	A	H	H	A	H	H	A	A	H	A	H	H	A	A	H	H	A	H	H	A	H	A	A	H	A	H	H	A
Result	L	L	W	D	D	W	W	W	W	L	D	W	W	W	W	D	W	D	L	L	D	W	W	W	W	W	D	L	L	W	W	L	W	W	D	W	W	L
Position	18	20	12	17	15	9	6	5	2	5	6	4	3	3	2	3	2	2	2	4	4	3	3	2	2	2	2	3	4	4	2	2	2	2	2	2	1	1

Updated to match(es) played on 1 November 2020. Source: Matches
A = Away; H = Home; W = Win; D = Draw; L = Loss

Goals and red cards are shown.

9 August 2020 1	Flamengo	0–1	Atlético Mineiro	Rio de Janeiro
16:00 UTC−3		report	Filipe Luís 23' (o.g.)	Stadium: Maracanã; Attendance: 0 Referee: Raphael Claus

12 August 2020 2	Atlético Goianiense	3–0	Flamengo	Goiânia
20:30 UTC−3	Hyuri 15'; Jorginho 32'; Ferrareis 61'	report	Alves (red card) 82'	Stadium: Estádio Olímpico Pedro Ludovico; Attendance: 0 Referee: Luiz Flávio de Oliveira

15 August 2020 3	Coritiba	0–1	Flamengo	Curitiba
19:30 UTC−3	Renê Jr. (yellow card) 34' (yellow-red card) 57'	report	de Arrascaeta 28'	Stadium: Estádio Couto Pereira; Attendance: 0 Referee: Rodrigo D'Alonso Ferreira

19 August 2020 4	Flamengo	1–1	Grêmio	Rio de Janeiro
19:15 UTC−3	Gabriel 89' (pen.)	report	Pepê 45'	Stadium: Maracanã; Attendance: 0 Referee: Rafael Traci

23 August 2020 5	Flamengo	1–1	Botafogo	Rio de Janeiro
11:00 UTC−3	Gabriel 90+11' (pen.)	report	Pedro Raúl 90+3'	Stadium: Maracanã; Attendance: 0 Referee: Leandro Pedro Vuaden

30 August 2020 6	Santos	0–1	Flamengo	Santos
16:00 UTC−3		report	Gabriel 45+5'	Stadium: Vila Belmiro; Attendance: 0 Referee: Wilton Pereira Sampaio

2 September 2020 7	Bahia	3–5	Flamengo	Salvador
20:30 UTC−3	Rodriguinho 32'; Élber 42'; Daniel 90'	report	Pedro 2', 16' de Arrascaeta 37', 52'; Ribeiro 48'	Stadium: Estádio de Pituaçu; Attendance: 0 Referee: Savio Pereira Sampaio

5 September 2020 8	Flamengo	2–1	Fortaleza	Rio de Janeiro
17:00 UTC−3	Ribeiro 6'; Gabriel 87'	report	Juninho 14' (pen.)	Stadium: Maracanã; Attendance: 0 Referee: Flavio Rodrigues de Souza

9 September 2020 9	Fluminense	1–2	Flamengo	Rio de Janeiro
21:30 UTC−3	Digão 90+2'	report	Filipe Luís 8'; Gabriel 34'	Stadium: Maracanã; Attendance: 0 Referee: Raphael Claus

12 September 2020 10	Ceará	2–0	Flamengo	Fortaleza
18:00 UTC−3	Luiz Otávio 50'; Charles 56'	report		Stadium: Castelão; Attendance: 0 Referee: Marielson Alves Silva

27 September 2020 12	Palmeiras	1–1	Flamengo	São Paulo
16:00 UTC−3	de Paula 54'	report	Pedro 56'	Stadium: Allianz Parque; Attendance: 0 Referee: Jean Pierre Gonçalves Lima

4 October 2020 13	Flamengo	3–1	Athletico Paranaense	Rio de Janeiro
16:00 UTC−3	Pedro 56'; Bruno Henrique 59' (pen.); Ribeiro 77'	report	Kayzer 67'	Stadium: Maracanã; Attendance: 0 Referee: Rodrigo D'Alonso Ferreira

7 October 2020 14	Flamengo	3–0	Sport	Rio de Janeiro
19:15 UTC−3	Pedro 51', 60'; Gustavo Henrique 55'	report		Stadium: Maracanã; Attendance: 0 Referee: Caio Max Augusto Vieira

10 October 2020 15	Vasco da Gama	1–2	Flamengo	Rio de Janeiro
17:00 UTC−3	Talles Magno 9'	report	Pereira 48'; Bruno Henrique 70'	Stadium: Estádio São Januário; Attendance: 0 Referee: Flavio Rodrigues De Souza

13 October 2020 11	Flamengo	2–1	Goiás	Rio de Janeiro
18:00 UTC−3	Pedro 39', 90+6'	report	Vinícius 13'	Stadium: Maracanã; Attendance: 0 Referee: Paulo Roberto Alves Júnior

15 October 2020 16	Flamengo	1–1	Red Bull Bragantino	Rio de Janeiro
20:00 UTC−3	Lincoln 70'	report	Claudinho 46'	Stadium: Maracanã; Attendance: 0 Referee: Daniel Nobre Bins

18 October 2020 17	Corinthians	1–5	Flamengo	São Paulo
16:00 UTC−3	Gil 64'	report	Ribeiro 32'; Vitinho 52'; Natan 58'; Bruno Henrique 71'; Diego 86'	Stadium: Neo Química Arena; Attendance: 0 Referee: Leandro Pedro Vuaden

25 October 2020 18	Internacional	2–2	Flamengo	Porto Alegre
18:15 UTC−3	Hernández 7'; Galhardo 25'	report	Pedro 11'; Ribeiro 90+5'	Stadium: Estádio Beira-Rio; Attendance: 0 Referee: Wilton Pereira Sampaio

1 November 2020 19	Flamengo	1–4	São Paulo	Rio de Janeiro
16:00 UTC−3	Pedro 6'	report	Tchê Tchê 17'; Brenner 45+1'; Reinaldo 59' (pen.); Luciano 82'	Stadium: Maracanã; Attendance: 0 Referee: Caio Max Augusto Vieira

7 November 2020 20	Atlético Mineiro	4–0	Flamengo	Belo Horizonte
18:15 UTC−3	Gustavo Henrique 4' (og.); Keno 8'; Sasha 59'; Zaracho 82'	report		Stadium: Mineirão; Attendance: 0 Referee: Savio Pereira

14 November 2020 21	Flamengo	1–1	Atlético Goianiense	Rio de Janeiro
21:30 UTC−3	Bruno Henrique 45'	report	Zé Roberto 59'	Stadium: Maracanã; Attendance: 0 Referee: Rafael Traci

21 November 2020 22	Flamengo	3–1	Coritiba	Rio de Janeiro
19:00 UTC−3	Bruno Henrique 3' de Arrascaeta 27'; Renê 76'	report	Oliveira 90+3'	Stadium: Maracanã; Attendance: 0 Referee: Ricardo Marques Ribeiro

5 December 2020 24	Botafogo	0–1	Flamengo	Rio de Janeiro
17:00 UTC−3	Victor Luis (red card) 85'	report	Ribeiro 55'; Gustavo Henrique (red card) 89'	Stadium: Estádio Olímpico Nilton Santos; Attendance: 0 Referee: Anderson Daronco

13 December 2020 25	Flamengo	4–1	Santos	Rio de Janeiro
16:00 UTC−3	Gerson 42'; Gabriel 50' (pen.), 71' (pen.); Filipe Luis 58'	report	Marques 75'	Stadium: Maracanã; Referee: Paulo Roberto Alves Júnior

20 December 2020 26	Flamengo	4–3	Bahia	Rio de Janeiro
18:15 UTC−3	Bruno Henrique 5'; Isla 33'; Pedro 82'; Vitinho 90'; Gabriel (red card) 10'	report	Ramírez 50'; Gilberto 56', 59'; Daniel (red card) 90+1'	Stadium: Maracanã; Attendance: 0 Referee: Flavio Rodrigues De Souza

26 December 2020 27	Fortaleza	0–0	Flamengo	Fortaleza
19:00 UTC−3		report		Stadium: Castelão; Attendance: 0 Referee: Rafael Traci

7 January 2021 28	Flamengo	1–2	Fluminense	Rio de Janeiro
21:30 UTC−3	de Arrascaeta 40'	report	Claro 55'; Yago Felipe 90+3'	Stadium: Maracanã; Attendance: 0 Referee: Leandro Pedro Vuaden

10 January 2021 29	Flamengo	0–2	Ceará	Rio de Janeiro
16:00 UTC−3		report	Vina 13'; Kelvyn 90'	Stadium: Maracanã; Attendance: 0 Referee: Paulo Roberto Alves Júnior

18 January 2021 30	Goiás	0–3	Flamengo	Goiânia
20:00 UTC−3		report	de Arrascaeta 42'; Gabriel 63'; Pedro 90+4'	Stadium: Estádio da Serrinha; Attendance: 0 Referee: Rodolpho Toski Marques

21 January 2021 31	Flamengo	2–0	Palmeiras	Brasília
19:00 UTC−3	Luan 45+1' (o.g.); Pepê 83'	report		Stadium: Mané Garrincha; Referee: Savio Pereira

24 January 2021 32	Athletico Paranaense	2–1	Flamengo	Curitiba
16:00 UTC−3	Abner Vinícius 25'; Kayser 83'	report	Gustavo Henrique 34'	Stadium: Arena da Baixada; Attendance: 0 Referee: Leandro Pedro Vuaden

28 January 2021 23	Grêmio	2–4	Flamengo	Porto Alegre
20:00 UTC−3	Souza 40', 85'	report	Ribeiro 57'; Gabriel 60' de Arrascaeta 66'; Isla 90+3'	Stadium: Arena do Grêmio; Attendance: 0 Referee: Rodolpho Toski Marques

1 February 2021 33	Sport	0–3	Flamengo	Recife
20:00 UTC−3		report	Gabriel 4'; Bruno Henrique 19'; Pedro 90+6'	Stadium: Estádio Ilha do Retiro; Attendance: 0 Referee: Rafael Traci

4 February 2021 34	Flamengo	2–0	Vasco da Gama	Rio de Janeiro
21:00 UTC−3	Gabriel 45+3' (pen.); Bruno Henrique 77'	report		Stadium: Maracanã; Attendance: 0 Referee: Raphael Claus

7 February 2021 35	Red Bull Bragantino	1–1	Flamengo	Bragança Paulista
20:30 UTC−3	Ytalo 63'	report	Gabriel 35' (pen.)	Stadium: Estádio Nabi Abi Chedid; Attendance: 0 Referee: Wilton Pereira Sampaio

14 February 2021 36	Flamengo	2–1	Corinthians	Rio de Janeiro
16:00 UTC−3	Arão 10'; Gabriel 55'	report	Natel 20'	Stadium: Maracanã; Attendance: 0 Referee: Rafael Traci

21 February 2021 37	Flamengo	2–1	Internacional	Rio de Janeiro
16:00 UTC−3	de Arrascaeta 29'; Gabriel 63'	report	Edenílson 12' (pen.); Rodinei (red card) 49'	Stadium: Maracanã; Attendance: 0 Referee: Raphael Claus

25 February 2021 38	São Paulo	2–1	Flamengo	São Paulo
21:30 UTC−3	Luciano 45+5'; Pablo 58'	report	Bruno Henrique 51'	Stadium: Estádio do Morumbi; Attendance: 0 Referee: Rodolpho Toski Marques

=== Copa do Brasil ===
As Flamengo will participate in the 2020 Copa Libertadores, the club will enter the Copa do Brasil in the round of 16.

==== Round of 16 ====
Goals and red cards are shown.

28 October 2020 1st leg	Athletico Paranaense	0–1	Flamengo	Curitiba
21:30 UTC−3		report	Bruno Henrique 20'	Stadium: Arena da Baixada; Attendance: 0 Referee: Ricardo Marques Ribeiro

4 November 2020 2nd leg	Flamengo	3–2 (4–2 agg.)	Athletico Paranaense	Rio de Janeiro
21:30 UTC−3	Pedro 24', 34'; Michael 84'	report	Erick 41'; Bissoli 88'	Stadium: Maracanã; Attendance: 0 Referee: Rodrigo D'Alonso Ferreira

Flamengo won 4–2 on aggregate and advanced to the quarter-finals.

==== Quarter-final ====
Goals and red cards are shown.

11 November 2020 1st leg	Flamengo	1–2	São Paulo	Rio de Janeiro
21:30 UTC−3	Gabriel 49'	report	Brenner 47', 88'	Stadium: Maracanã; Attendance: 0 Referee: Anderson Daronco

18 November 2020 2nd leg	São Paulo	3–0 (5–1 agg.)	Flamengo	São Paulo
21:30 UTC−3	Luciano 47', 56'; Pablo 85'	report		Stadium: Morumbi; Attendance: 0 Referee: Wilton Pereira Sampaio

São Paulo won 5–1 on aggregate and advanced to the semi-finals.

== Management team ==
As of 1 February 2021.

Position	Name
Coaching staff
Manager	(Brazil) Rogério Ceni
Assistant manager	(Brazil) Nelson Simões Júnior
Assistant manager	(France) Charles Hembert
Goalkeepers trainer	(Brazil) Wagner Miranda
Goalkeepers trainer	(Brazil) Thiago Heler
Medical staff
Fitness coach	(Brazil) Danilo Augusto
Fitness coach	(Brazil) Alexandre Sanz
Fitness coach	(Brazil) Roberto Oliveira Junior
Fitness coach	(Brazil) Leonardo Melo
Team doctor	(Brazil) Marcio Tannure
Team doctor	(Brazil) João Marcelo
Team doctor	(Brazil) Gustavo Caldeira
Team doctor	(Brazil) Serafim Borges
Team doctor	(Brazil) Luiz Claudio Baldi
Physiotherapist	(Brazil) Mario Peixoto
Physiotherapist	(Brazil) Eduardo Calçada
Physiotherapist	(Brazil) Marcio Puglia

== Roster ==
As of 26 February 2021

No.	Pos.	Name	Date of birth (age)	Signed in	Contract end	Signed from	Fee	Notes
Goalkeepers
1	GK	(Brazil) Diego Alves	24 June 1985 (aged 35)	2017	2020	(Spain) Valencia	€300k	
22	GK	(Brazil) Gabriel Batista	3 June 1998 (aged 22)	2017	2022	Youth system		
37	GK	(Brazil) César	27 January 1992 (aged 28)	2013	2022	Youth system		
45	GK	(Brazil) Hugo Souza	31 January 1999 (aged 21)	2018	2023	Youth system		
Defenders
2	CB	(Brazil) Gustavo Henrique	24 March 1993 (aged 27)	2020	2024	(Brazil) Santos	Free	
3	CB	(Brazil) Rodrigo Caio	17 August 1993 (aged 27)	2019	2023	(Brazil) São Paulo	€5m	
4	CB	(Brazil) Léo Pereira	31 January 1996 (aged 24)	2020	2024	(Brazil) Athletico Paranaense	€6.1m	
6	LB	(Brazil) Renê	14 September 1992 (aged 28)	2017	2022	(Brazil) Sport Recife	€955k	
13	RB	(Brazil) João Lucas	9 March 1998 (aged 22)	2019	2021	(Brazil) Bangu	Undisclosed	
16	LB	(Brazil) Filipe Luís	9 August 1985 (aged 35)	2019	2021	(Spain) Atlético Madrid	Free	
26	CB	(Brazil) Matheus Thuler	10 March 1999 (aged 21)	2017	2024	Youth system		
31	CB	(Brazil) Natan	6 February 2001 (aged 19)	2020	2024	Youth system		
34	RB	(Brazil) Matheuzinho	8 September 2000 (aged 20)	2020	2025	(Brazil) Londrina	€180k	
36	LB	(Brazil) Ramon	13 March 2001 (aged 19)	2020	2025	Youth system		
44	RB	(Chile) Mauricio Isla	12 June 1988 (aged 32)	2020	2022	(Turkey) Fenerbahçe	Free	
Midfielders
5	CM	(Brazil) Willian Arão	3 December 1992 (aged 28)	2016	2023	(Brazil) Botafogo	Free	
7	AM	(Brazil) Éverton Ribeiro	10 April 1989 (aged 31)	2017	2023	(United Arab Emirates) Al-Ahli	€6m	
8	CM	(Brazil) Gerson	20 May 1997 (aged 23)	2019	2023	(Italy) Roma	€11.8m	
10	AM	(Brazil) Diego	28 February 1985 (aged 35)	2016	2021	(Turkey) Fenerbahçe	Free	Captain
14	AM	(Uruguay) Giorgian de Arrascaeta	1 June 1994 (aged 26)	2019	2023	(Brazil) Cruzeiro	€13m	
33	DM	(Brazil) Thiago Maia	23 March 1997 (aged 23)	2020	2022	(France) Lille	Free	Loan
40	AM	(Brazil) Pepê	6 January 1998 (aged 22)	2018	2020	Youth system		
Forwards
9	CF	(Brazil) Gabriel Barbosa	30 August 1996 (aged 24)	2020	2024	(Italy) Inter Milan	€17m	
11	LW	(Brazil) Vitinho	9 October 1993 (aged 27)	2018	2022	(Russia) CSKA Moscow	€10m	
19	CF	(Brazil) Michael	12 March 1996 (aged 24)	2020	2024	(Brazil) Goiás	€7.5m	
20	CF	(Brazil) Lázaro	12 March 2002 (aged 18)	2020	2025	Youth system		
21	CF	(Brazil) Pedro	20 June 1997 (aged 23)	2021	2023	(Italy) Fiorentina	€14m	
27	LW	(Brazil) Bruno Henrique	30 December 1990 (aged 29)	2019	2023	(Brazil) Santos	€5.36m	

== Transfers and loans ==
=== Transfers in ===
Position	Player	Transferred from	Fee	Date	Source
FW	(Brazil) Bill	(Brazil) Ponte Preta	Loan return	4 December 2019	
FW	(Brazil) Thiago Fernandes	(Brazil) Náutico	Undisclosed	12 December 2019	
DF	(Brazil) Gustavo Henrique	(Brazil) Santos	Free	18 December 2019	
GK	(Brazil) Thiago da Silva	(Brazil) América-MG	Loan return	1 January 2020	
GK	(Brazil) Alex Muralha	(Brazil) Coritiba	Loan return	1 January 2020	
MF	(Brazil) Rômulo	(Brazil) Grêmio	Loan return	1 January 2020	
FW	(Brazil) Thiago Santos	(Brazil) Chapecoense	Loan return	1 January 2020	
MF	(Brazil) Gabriel	(Japan) Kashiwa Reysol	Loan return	1 January 2020	
FW	(Brazil) Michael	(Brazil) Goiás	R$34m / €7.5m	10 January 2020	
FW	(Brazil) Gabriel Barbosa	(Italy) Inter Milan	R$78.6m / €17m	28 January 2020	
DF	(Brazil) Léo Pereira	(Brazil) Athletico Paranaense	R$28m / €6.1m	28 January 2020	
DF	(Chile) Mauricio Isla	(Turkey) Fenerbahçe	Free	19 August 2020	
FW	(Brazil) Pedro	(Italy) Fiorentina	R$87m / €14m	9 December 2020	
Total			R$227.6m / €44.6m		

=== Loan in ===
Position	Player	Loaned from	Start	End	Source
FW	(Brazil) Pedro Rocha	(Russia) Spartak Moscow	1 January 2020	31 December 2020	
MF	(Brazil) Thiago Maia	(France) Lille	22 January 2020	31 December 2020	
FW	(Brazil) Pedro	(Italy) Fiorentina	23 January 2020	31 December 2020	

=== Transfers out ===
Position	Player	Transferred to	Fee	Date	Source
MF	(Brazil) Matheus Sávio	(Japan) Kashiwa Reysol	R$4.6m / €1m	9 December 2019	
FW	(Brazil) Gabriel Barbosa	(Italy) Inter Milan	Loan return	1 January 2020	
DF	(Brazil) Rhodolfo	(Brazil) Coritiba	Free	9 January 2020	
MF	(Brazil) Rômulo	(China) Shijiazhuang Ever Bright	Free	9 January 2020	
MF	(Brazil) Gabriel	(Brazil) Coritiba	Free	13 January 2020	
MF	(Brazil) Reinier	(Spain) Real Madrid	R$136m / €30m	20 January 2020	
MF	(Brazil) Luiz Henrique	(Brazil) Fortaleza	Undisclosed	8 February 2020	
FW	(Brazil) Wendel	(Portugal) Leixões	Free	11 June 2020	
DF	(Spain) Pablo Marí	(England) Arsenal	R$95m / €16m	1 July 2020	
GK	(Brazil) Thiago da Silva	(Portugal) Estoril	Free	16 July 2020	
FW	(Colombia) Orlando Berrío	(United Arab Emirates) Khor Fakkan	Free	19 July 2020	
FW	(Brazil) Lucas Silva	(Portugal) Paços de Ferreira	Free	22 July 2020	
DF	(Brazil) Caio Roque	(Belgium) Lommel S.K.	R$10m / €1.6m	7 August 2020	
DF	(Brazil) Rafinha	(Greece) Olympiakos	Free	14 August 2020	
DF	(Brazil) Matheus Dantas	(Brazil) Oeste	Free	20 August 2020	
MF	(Brazil) Vinícius Souza	(Belgium) Lommel S.K.	R$16.3m / €2.5m	25 August 2020	
FW	(Brazil) Lincoln	(Japan) Vissel Kobe	R$15.6m / €2.4m	14 January 2021	
FW	(Brazil) Yuri César	(United Arab Emirates) Shabab Al Ahli	R$31m / €4.9m	26 January 2021	
Total			R$308.5m / €58.4m		

=== Loan out ===
Position	Player	Loaned to	Start	End	Source
DF	(Brazil) Rodinei	(Brazil) Internacional	1 January 2020	25 February 2021	
GK	(Brazil) Alex Muralha	(Brazil) Coritiba	9 January 2020	25 February 2021	
GK	(Brazil) Yago Darub	(Brazil) Red Bull Brasil	9 January 2020	25 February 2021	
FW	(Brazil) Vitor Gabriel	(Portugal) Braga	28 January 2020	30 June 2021	
DF	(Spain) Pablo Marí	(England) Arsenal	28 January 2020	30 June 2020	
GK	(Brazil) Thiago da Silva	(Portugal) Estoril	29 January 2020	30 June 2020	
MF	(Brazil) Yuri César	(Brazil) Fortaleza	8 March 2020	25 February 2021	
FW	(Brazil) Bill	(Brazil) CRB	16 March 2020	25 February 2021	
FW	(Brazil) Thiago Fernandes	(Brazil) Náutico	7 May 2020	25 February 2021	
DF	(Brazil) Rafael Santos	(Cyprus) APOEL	29 May 2020	30 June 2022	
MF	(Brazil) Hugo Moura	(Brazil) Coritiba	31 August 2020	25 February 2021	
MF	(Paraguay) Robert Piris Da Motta	(Turkey) Gençlerbirliği	11 September 2020	30 June 2021	
FW	(Brazil) Rodrigo Muniz	(Brazil) Coritiba	13 October 2020	25 February 2021	

== Statistics ==
Last updated: 26 February 2021.

Players in italics have left the club before the end of the season.

=== Appearances ===
No.	Pos.	Name	Série A		Copa do Brasil		Libertadores		Carioca		Other (Note: Includes Supercopa do Brasil and Recopa Sudamericana.)		Total		
No.	Pos.	Name	Starts	Subs	Starts	Subs	Starts	Subs	Starts	Subs	Starts	Subs	Starts	Subs	Apps
Goalkeepers
1	GK	(Brazil) Diego Alves	10	0	2	0	4	0	10	0	3	0	29	0	29
22	GK	(Brazil) Gabriel Batista	3	0	—	—	0	0	4	0	0	0	7	0	7
37	GK	(Brazil) César	3	2	0	0	3	0	3	0	0	0	9	2	11
45	GK	(Brazil) Hugo Souza	22	1	2	1	1	0	0	0	—	—	25	2	27
Defenders
2	CB	(Brazil) Gustavo Henrique	23	2	1	1	3	1	6	1	3	0	36	5	41
3	CB	(Brazil) Rodrigo Caio	20	0	4	0	3	0	7	0	2	0	36	0	36
4	CB	(Brazil) Léo Pereira	11	2	4	0	6	0	10	0	1	0	32	2	34
6	LB	(Brazil) Renê	7	5	2	2	3	1	5	1	0	1	17	10	27
13	RB	(Brazil) João Lucas	3	2	0	0	1	0	5	0	0	0	9	2	11
16	LB	(Brazil) Filipe Luís	31	0	2	0	5	0	8	0	3	0	49	0	49
26	CB	(Brazil) Matheus Thuler	2	2	1	0	3	0	2	0	0	1	8	3	11
31	CB	(Brazil) Natan	12	2	0	0	1	0	—	—	—	—	13	2	15
34	RB	(Brazil) Matheuzinho	4	9	2	0	3	0	2	1	—	—	11	10	21
36	LB	(Brazil) Ramon	1	3	0	1	1	2	4	0	—	—	6	6	12
41	CB	(Brazil) Gabriel Noga	1	1	1	0	1	1	—	—	—	—	3	2	5
44	RB	(Chile) Mauricio Isla	28	1	1	1	2	1	—	—	—	—	31	3	34
51	CB	(Brazil) Otávio	1	0	—	—	—	—	—	—	—	—	1	0	1
Midfielders
5	CM	(Brazil) Willian Arão	29	3	2	0	5	0	12	1	3	0	51	4	55
7	AM	(Brazil) Éverton Ribeiro	31	2	2	1	4	0	10	2	3	0	50	5	55
8	CM	(Brazil) Gerson	33	1	3	0	7	0	7	3	3	0	53	4	57
10	AM	(Brazil) Diego	14	12	2	2	2	4	6	7	1	1	25	26	51
14	AM	(Uruguay) Giorgian de Arrascaeta	26	2	1	1	7	0	10	0	3	0	47	3	50
33	DM	(Brazil) Thiago Maia	13	1	2	1	4	1	1	5	0	1	20	9	29
35	CM	(Brazil) João Gomes	4	7	0	0	0	3	—	—	—	—	4	10	14
39	AM	(Brazil) Daniel Cabral	0	0	0	1	—	—	—	—	—	—	0	1	1
40	AM	(Brazil) Pepê	0	11	—	—	—	—	2	2	—	—	2	13	15
54	CM	(Colombia) Richard Ríos	0	1	—	—	—	—	1	1	—	—	1	2	3
56	AM	(Brazil) Yuri de Oliveira	0	1	—	—	—	—	—	—	—	—	0	1	1
Forwards
9	CF	(Brazil) Gabriel Barbosa	22	3	1	0	5	0	10	0	2	0	40	3	43
11	LW	(Brazil) Vitinho	9	20	3	0	3	2	3	7	0	2	18	31	49
19	CF	(Brazil) Michael	4	16	2	1	1	4	3	10	0	2	10	33	43
20	CF	(Brazil) Lázaro	0	2	0	1	0	1	—	—	—	—	0	4	4
21	CF	(Brazil) Pedro	15	19	2	0	2	3	5	6	1	1	25	29	54
27	LW	(Brazil) Bruno Henrique	30	1	4	0	4	2	10	0	2	0	50	3	53
42	CF	(Brazil) Guilherme	1	0	—	—	0	1	0	1	—	—	1	2	3
43	CF	(Brazil) Rodrigo Muniz	0	4	—	—	0	0	2	1	—	—	2	5	7
Players transferred out during the season
13	RB	(Brazil) Rafinha	1	1	—	—	1	0	10	0	3	0	15	1	16
15	DM	(Brazil) Vinícius Souza	0	0	—	—	0	0	4	0	0	0	4	0	4
17	DM	(Brazil) Hugo Moura	0	0	—	—	–	–	4	0	0	0	4	0	4
23	LW	(Brazil) Lucas Silva	—	—	—	—	0	0	3	1	—	—	3	1	4
25	DM	(Paraguay) Robert Piris Da Motta	0	0	—	—	0	0	0	0	—	—	0	0	0
28	RW	(Colombia) Orlando Berrío	—	—	—	—	0	0	0	2	—	—	0	2	2
29	CF	(Brazil) Lincoln	2	12	0	2	2	1	0	1	0	0	4	16	20
32	CF	(Brazil) Pedro Rocha	2	3	0	2	0	0	1	3	0	0	5	6	11
54	FW	(Brazil) Vitor Gabriel	—	—	—	—	—	—	2	1	—	—	2	1	3
55	CB	(Brazil) Matheus Dantas	—	—	—	—	0	0	4	0	0	0	4	0	4
58	CB	(Brazil) Rafael Santos	—	—	—	—	—	—	4	0	—	—	4	0	4
59	CF	(Brazil) Bill	—	—	—	—	—	—	1	1	—	—	1	1	2
–	CM	(Brazil) Luiz Henrique	—	—	—	—	—	—	2	2	—	—	2	2	4
–	AM	(Brazil) Yuri César	—	—	—	—	—	—	4	0	—	—	4	0	4
–	CF	(Brazil) Thiago Fernandes	—	—	—	—	—	—	0	0	—	—	0	0	0
–	CF	(Brazil) Wendel	—	—	—	—	—	—	0	3	—	—	0	3	3

=== Goalscorers ===
Rank	Pos.	No.	Player	Série A	Copa do Brasil	Libertadores	Carioca	Other (Note: Includes Supercopa do Brasil and Recopa Sudamericana.)	Total
1	FW	9	(Brazil) Gabriel Barbosa	14	1	2	8	2	27
2	FW	21	(Brazil) Pedro	13	2	2	5	1	23
3	FW	27	(Brazil) Bruno Henrique	9	1	4	5	2	21
4	MF	14	(Uruguay) Giorgian de Arrascaeta	8	0	1	2	1	12
5	MF	7	(Brazil) Éverton Ribeiro	7	0	2	1	0	10
6	MF	8	(Brazil) Gerson	1	0	0	1	2	4
6	FW	19	(Brazil) Michael	0	1	0	3	0	4
7	DF	2	(Brazil) Gustavo Henrique	2	0	1	0	0	3
7	DF	16	(Brazil) Filipe Luís	2	0	0	1	0	3
7	FW	11	(Brazil) Vitinho	2	0	0	1	0	3
7	FW	29	(Brazil) Lincoln	1	0	2	0	0	3
9	DF	44	(Chile) Mauricio Isla	2	0	0	0	0	2
9	MF	5	(Brazil) Willian Arão	1	0	1	0	0	2
9	MF	10	(Brazil) Diego	1	0	0	1	0	2
13	DF	4	(Brazil) Léo Pereira	1	0	0	0	0	1
13	DF	6	(Brazil) Renê	1	0	0	0	0	1
13	DF	31	(Brazil) Natan	1	0	0	0	0	1
13	MF	40	(Brazil) Pepê	1	0	0	0	0	1
13	DF	26	(Brazil) Matheus Thuler	0	0	1	0	0	1
13	FW	23	(Brazil) Lucas Silva	0	0	0	1	0	1
13	FW	32	(Brazil) Pedro Rocha	0	0	0	1	0	1
13	FW	43	(Brazil) Rodrigo Muniz	0	0	0	1	0	1
13	FW	59	(Brazil) Bill	0	0	0	1	0	1
Own Goals				1	0	0	1	2	1
Total				68	5	16	34	8	131

=== Assists ===
Rank	Pos.	No.	Player	Série A	Copa do Brasil	Libertadores	Carioca	Other (Note: Includes Supercopa do Brasil and Recopa Sudamericana.)	Total
1	MF	14	(Uruguay) Giorgian de Arrascaeta	9	0	3	–	1	13
2	MF	7	(Brazil) Éverton Ribeiro	6	0	2	–	1	9
2	FW	27	(Brazil) Bruno Henrique	7	1	1	–	0	9
4	DF	44	(Chile) Mauricio Isla	5	0	0	–	0	5
5	MF	8	(Brazil) Gerson	3	0	1	–	0	4
5	FW	9	(Brazil) Gabriel Barbosa	2	0	1	–	1	4
5	MF	10	(Brazil) Diego	3	0	1	–	0	4
5	MF	11	(Brazil) Vitinho	3	0	0	–	1	4
5	DF	34	(Brazil) Matheuzinho	1	1	2	–	0	4
10	DF	16	(Brazil) Filipe Luís	2	0	0	–	0	2
10	FW	19	(Brazil) Michael	1	0	1	–	0	2
10	FW	21	(Brazil) Pedro	2	0	0	–	0	2
13	DF	2	(Brazil) Gustavo Henrique	1	0	0	–	0	1
13	MF	5	(Brazil) Willian Arão	1	0	0	–	0	1
13	DF	6	(Brazil) Renê	1	0	0	–	0	1
13	FW	29	(Brazil) Lincoln	1	0	0	–	0	1
13	FW	32	(Brazil) Pedro Rocha	1	0	0	–	0	1
13	MF	33	(Brazil) Thiago Maia	1	0	0	–	0	1
Total				50	2	12	0	4	68

=== Clean sheets ===
Rank	No.	Player	Série A	Copa do Brasil	Libertadores	Carioca	Other (Note: Includes Supercopa do Brasil and Recopa Sudamericana.)	Total
1	1	(Brazil) Diego Alves	4 / 10	0 / 2	1 / 4	5 / 10	2 / 3	12 / 29
2	45	(Brazil) Hugo Souza	5 / 22	1 / 2	1 / 1	–	—	7 / 25
3	22	(Brazil) Gabriel Batista	0 / 3	—	—	2 / 4	—	2 / 7
4	37	(Brazil) César	1 / 3	—	0 / 3	0 / 3	—	1 / 9
Total			10 / 38	1 / 4	2 / 8	7 / 17	2 / 3	22 / 70
