= Fabrício (footballer, born January 1986) =

Brazilian footballer

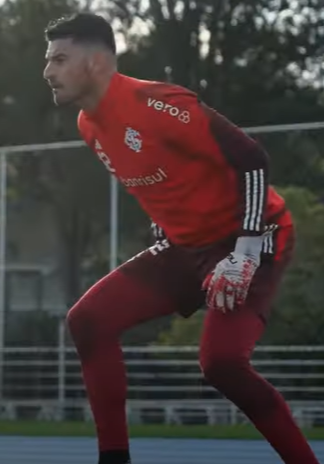

Personal information
- Full name: Fabrício Barros Santana
- Date of birth: 7 January 1986 (age 40)
- Place of birth: Paranavaí, Brazil
- Height: 1.92 m (6 ft 4 in)
- Position: Goalkeeper

Team information
- Current team: Figueirense
- Number: 12

Youth career
- –2006: Iraty

Senior career*
Years	Team	Apps	(Gls)
2006–2009	Iraty		
2007	→ Rio Branco-PR (loan)		
2008	→ Rio Branco-PR (loan)		
2008	→ Paranavaí (loan)		
2009	Olé Brasil		
2010	Guarani de Juazeiro	18	(0)
2010	Icasa	1	(0)
2011	Rio Branco-PR	16	(0)
2011	Operário Ferroviário	6	(0)
2012	Cianorte	36	(0)
2013–2017	J. Malucelli	68	(0)
2015	→ Foz do Iguaçu FC (loan)	7	(0)
2017–2018	Boa Esporte	69	(0)
2019	CSA	2	(0)
2020–2021	Vila Nova	35	(0)
2022	Santo André	0	(0)
2022	Água Santa	0	(0)
2023	Azuriz	10	(0)
2023	Uberlândia	10	(0)
2024	Nova Iguaçu	14	(0)
2024	Internacional	8	(0)
2025–	Figueirense	32	(0)
- * Club domestic league appearances and goals as of 10 November 2026

Fabrício Barros Santana (born 7 January 1986), known as Fabrício Santana or just Fabrício, is a Brazilian professional footballer who plays as a goalkeeper for Figueirense.

== Career ==
Born in Paraná and revealed by Iraty SC, Fabrício played most of his career for teams in his home state. His professional achievements were the second division of Ceará with Icasa in 2010 and the state championship with CSA in 2019, both as reserve, and the 2020 Campeonato Brasileiro Série C with Vila Nova.

The player gained prominence only at the age of 38, due to Nova Iguaçu's finalist campaign in the 2024 Campeonato Carioca, he was even caught returning from the Estádio do Maracanã by metro after the semi-finals in which his club eliminated CR Vasco da Gama. Before playing for Nova Iguaçu, he had been Uberlândia EC goalkeeper in the Campeonato Mineiro Módulo II. On 8 April 2024 Fabricio was announced as reinforcement of the SC Internacional.

After playing 10 matches for SC Internacional, Fabrício was released at the end of 2024, being signed for the 2025 season by Figueirense FC.

== Honours ==
Icasa

- Campeonato Cearense Série B: 2010

CSA

- Campeonato Alagoano: 2019

Vila Nova

- Campeonato Brasileiro Série C: 2020

Figueirense

- Copa Santa Catarina: 2025
