= Max (footballer, born 2002) =

Brazilian footballer (born 2002)

Personal information
- Full name: Maswel Ananias Silva
- Date of birth: 28 June 2002 (age 24)
- Place of birth: Rio de Janeiro, Brazil
- Height: 1.84 m (6 ft 0 in)
- Position: Forward

Team information
- Current team: Athletic
- Number: 77

Youth career
- Duque de Caxias
- 2022–2023: Sampaio Corrêa-RJ

Senior career*
Years	Team	Apps	(Gls)
2023–2025	Sampaio Corrêa-RJ	37	(13)
2024	→ Atlético Goianiense (loan)	14	(0)
2025–	Athletic	55	(5)
- * Club domestic league appearances and goals as of 18 November 2026

Maswel Ananias Silva (born 28 June 2002), commonly known as Max, is a Brazilian professional footballer who plays as a forward for Athletic.

== Career ==
A Sampaio Corrêa-RJ youth graduate, Max made his senior debut in the 2023 Campeonato Carioca Série A2, as the club achieved promotion as champions. He was a regular starter for the club in the 2024 Campeonato Carioca, scoring a goal against Vasco da Gama on 22 January and a brace against Audax Rio which qualified the club to the Taça Rio.

On 13 March 2024, after being Sampaio's top goalscorer in the Carioca, Max was loaned to Série A side Atlético Goianiense until the end of the year, with a buyout clause. He made his club – and top tier – debut on 14 April, coming on as a late substitute for Luiz Fernando in a 2–1 home loss to Flamengo.

Back to Sampaio for the 2025 Campeonato Carioca, Max was one of the top scorers with six goals, and helped the side to qualify to the Série D for the first time ever.

== Career statistics ==
As of 1 April 2025

Appearances and goals by club, season and competition
Club	Season	League			State League (Note: Includes Campeonato Carioca Série A2, Campeonato Carioca.)		Cup (Note: Includes Copa do Brasil.)		Continental		Other		Total	
Club	Season	Division	Apps	Goals	Apps	Goals	Apps	Goals	Apps	Goals	Apps	Goals	Apps	Goals
Sampaio Corrêa-RJ	2023	Carioca Série A2	—		10	2	—		—		—		10	2
Sampaio Corrêa-RJ	2024	Carioca	—		12	5	—		—		—		12	5
Sampaio Corrêa-RJ	2025	Carioca	—		15	6	—		—		—		15	6
Sampaio Corrêa-RJ	Total		0	0	37	13	0	0	0	0	0	0	37	13
Atlético Goianiense (loan)	2024	Série A	14	0	—		3	0	—		—		17	0
Career total			14	0	37	13	3	0	0	0	0	0	54	13

== Honours ==
Sampaio Corrêa-RJ

- Campeonato Carioca Série A2: 2023
- Taça Rio: 2025

Individual

- 2025 Campeonato Carioca top scorer: 6 goals
