= 2025 Campeonato Carioca =

Campeonato Carioca
- Season: 2025
- Dates: 11 January – 16 March 2025
- Champions: Flamengo (39th title)
- Relegated: Bangu
- Copa do Brasil: Flamengo; Fluminense; Sampaio Corrêa; Vasco da Gama; Volta Redonda
- Série D: Madureira; Sampaio Corrêa
- Matches: 78
- Goals: 170 (2.18 per match)
- Top goalscorer: Max, Pablo Vegetti and Germán Cano (6 goals each)

The 2025 Campeonato Carioca de Futebol (officially the Campeonato Carioca Superbet 2025 for sponsorship reasons) was the 122nd edition of the top division of football in the state of Rio de Janeiro. The competition is organized by FERJ. It began on 11 January 2025 and ended on 16 March 2025. Flamengo successfully defended its title and won the competition for the 39th time.

== Participating teams ==
Location of teams in the 2025 Campeonato Carioca
Location of teams in the 2025 Campeonato Carioca – city of Rio de Janeiro

Club	Home city (Note: Some clubs sold their home field advantage for some of their games to third parties, which means that some games were played in different states)	Head coach	2024 result
Bangu Atlético Clube	Rio de Janeiro (Bangu)	Júnior Martins	11th
Boavista Sport Club	Saquarema	Caio Zanardi	6th
Botafogo de Futebol e Regatas	Rio de Janeiro (Engenho de Dentro) (Note: Although Botafogo FR is headquartered in Botafogo, it plays home games at Engenhão Stadium)	Carlos Leiria (interim) and Cláudio Caçapa (interim)	5th
Clube de Regatas do Flamengo	Rio de Janeiro (Maracanã) (Note: Although CR Flamengo is headquartered in Lagoa, it plays home games at Maracanã Stadium)	Filipe Luís	1st
Fluminense Football Club	Rio de Janeiro (Maracanã) (Note: Although Fluminense FC is headquartered in Laranjeiras, it plays home games at Maracanã Stadium)	Mano Menezes	4th
Madureira Esporte Clube	Rio de Janeiro (Madureira)	Daniel Neri	9th
Maricá Futebol Clube	Maricá	Reinaldo	1st (Série A2)
Nova Iguaçu Futebol Clube	Nova Iguaçu	Carlos Vitor	2nd
Associação Atlética Portuguesa	Rio de Janeiro (Governador Island)	Evaristo Piza	7th
Sampaio Corrêa Futebol e Esporte	Saquarema	Alfredo Sampaio	8th
Club de Regatas Vasco da Gama	Rio de Janeiro (Vasco da Gama)	Fábio Carille	3rd
Volta Redonda Futebol Clube	Volta Redonda	Rogério Corrêa	10th

== Format ==
In the main competition, the twelve clubs played each other in a single round-robin stage called the Taça Guanabara. The last-placed team was relegated to the 2025 Série A2. The top four clubs qualified for the final stage of the Campeonato Carioca, while the next four clubs (5th to 8th places) qualified for the Taça Rio. In the Taça Rio, the 5th-placed club faced the 8th-placed club, and the 6th-placed faced the 7th-placed. In the final stage of the Campeonato Carioca, the winner of the Taça Guanabara faced the 4th-placed club, while the runner-up faced the 3rd-placed club. In both of these four-team brackets (the Taça Rio and the final stage of the Campeonato Carioca), the semi-finals and finals were played over two legs, without the use of the away goals rule. In the semi-finals of both the Taça Rio and the final stage, the higher placed teams in the Taça Guanabara table advanced in case of an aggregate tie. In the finals of both brackets, there was no such advantage; in case of an aggregate tie, a penalty shoot-out would have taken place.

The top four teams of the Campeonato Carioca and the winner of the Taça Rio qualified for the 2026 Copa do Brasil. Should these teams also qualify for the 2026 Copa do Brasil via national and international competitions, their Campeonato Carioca berths will be taken by the next-best team. The top two teams of the Campeonato Carioca that were not already playing in the Campeonato Brasileiro Série A, Série B or Série C qualified for the 2026 Série D.

== Taça Guanabara ==
Pos	Team	Pld	W	D	L	GF	GA	GD	Pts	Qualification
1	Flamengo (C)	11	7	2	2	25	5	+20	23	Taça Guanabara Champion and advance to semi-finals
2	Volta Redonda	11	6	2	3	13	12	+1	20	Advance to semi-finals
3	Fluminense	11	4	5	2	13	9	+4	17	Advance to semi-finals
4	Vasco da Gama	11	4	5	2	13	9	+4	17	Advance to semi-finals
5	Sampaio Corrêa	11	4	4	3	13	11	+2	16	Advance to Taça Rio semi-finals
6	Nova Iguaçu	11	4	4	3	8	9	−1	16	Advance to Taça Rio semi-finals
7	Madureira	11	4	3	4	11	8	+3	15	Advance to Taça Rio semi-finals
8	Boavista	11	2	8	1	10	8	+2	14	Advance to Taça Rio semi-finals
9	Botafogo	11	4	1	6	11	12	−1	13	
10	Maricá	11	3	3	5	11	17	−6	12	
11	Portuguesa	11	3	1	7	12	24	−12	10	
12	Bangu (R)	11	0	4	7	4	20	−16	4	Relegated

Source: FERJ
Rules for classification: 1) points; 2) wins; 3) goal difference; 4) goals scored; 5) head-to-head results; 6) disciplinary record; 7) random draw.
(C) Champions; (R) Relegated

2025 Taça Guanabara champions
Flamengo
25th title

== Taça Rio ==
Semi-finals
7	Madureira	0	2	2
6	Nova Iguaçu	0	1	1
8	Boavista	0	0	0
5	Sampaio Corrêa	0	3	3

Finals
7	Madureira	1	2	3
5	Sampaio Corrêa	2	4	6

2025 Taça Rio champions
Sampaio Corrêa
1st title

== Final stage ==
Semi-finals
3	Fluminense	4	0	4
2	Volta Redonda	0	0	0
4	Vasco da Gama	0	1	1
1	Flamengo	1	2	3

Finals
3	Fluminense	1	0	1
1	Flamengo	2	0	2

=== Semi-finals ===
==== Group A ====
1 March 2025
17:45

Vasco da Gama	0–1	Flamengo
	Report	Bruno Henrique 67'

Estádio Nilton Santos, Rio de Janeiro
Attendance: 10,966
Referee: Bruno Arleu de Araújo

8 March 2025
17:45

Flamengo	2–1	Vasco da Gama
Bruno Henrique 36'; Luiz Araújo 69'	Report	Nuno Moreira 22'

Maracanã, Rio de Janeiro
Attendance: 55,096
Referee: Wagner do Nascimento Magalhães

==== Group B ====
2 March 2025
18:00

Fluminense	4–0	Volta Redonda
Canobbio 7', 18'; Arias 42'; Cano 71'	Report

Maracanã, Rio de Janeiro
Attendance: 17,877
Referee: Yuri Elino Ferreira da Cruz

9 March 2025
18:00

Volta Redonda	0–0	Fluminense
	Report

Estádio Raulino de Oliveira, Volta Redonda
Attendance: 7,135
Referee: Alex Gomes Stefano

=== Finals ===
==== First leg ====
12 March 2025
21:30

Fluminense	1–2	Flamengo
Keno 88'	Report	Wesley França 6'; Juninho 76'

Maracanã, Rio de Janeiro
Attendance: 39,120
Referee: Yuri Elino Ferreira da Cruz

==== Second leg ====
16 March 2025
16:00

Flamengo	0–0	Fluminense
	Report

Maracanã, Rio de Janeiro
Attendance: 69,393
Referee: Bruno Arleu de Araújo

2025 Campeonato Carioca champions
Flamengo
39th title

== Top goalscorers ==
Rank	Player	Team	Goals
1	(Brazil) Max	Sampaio Corrêa	6
1	(Argentina) Pablo Vegetti	Vasco da Gama	6
1	(Argentina) Germán Cano	Fluminense	6
2	(Brazil) Elias	Sampaio Corrêa	5
2	(Brazil) Renato Henrique	Madureira	5
2	(Brazil) Zé Vitor	Boavista	5
