= Copa Rubro–Verde =

Brazilian pre-season football tournament

Copa Rubro-Verde
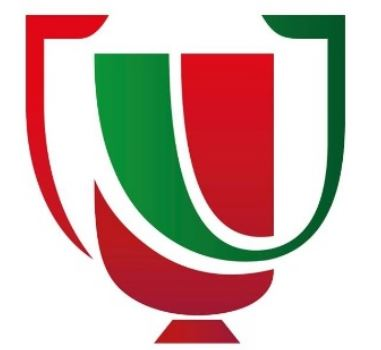
- Organising body: Portuguesa (RJ), Portuguesa (SP)
- Founded: 2018
- Folded: 2019
- Country: Brazil
- Number of clubs: 4–5
- Most championships: Portuguesa (RJ) (2 titles)

The Copa Rubro–Verde (English: Red–Green Cup) was a pre-season tournament which brought together the "Portuguesas" of Brazilian football. All the matches was played in Estádio do Canindé (2018, 2019) and Estádio Luso Brasileiro (2019).

== Participants ==
Club	State	City
Portuguesa Londrinense	(Paraná (state)) PR	Londrina
Portuguesa Carioca	(Rio de Janeiro (state)) RJ	Rio de Janeiro
Portuguesa	(São Paulo (state)) SP	São Paulo
Portuguesa Santista	(São Paulo (state)) SP	Santos
Marítimo	(Portugal) POR	Funchal

Note
Portuguese team CS Marítimo was invited to participate in the 2019 edition.

== List of Champions ==
Year	Champion	Final score	Runners-up
2018	Portuguesa; RJ	0–0; 3–1 (pen.)	Portuguesa; SP
2019	Portuguesa; RJ	3–0	Marítimo; POR
