= Luiz Henrique (footballer, born March 1999) =

Brazilian footballer

Personal information
- Full name: Luiz Henrique Araújo Silva
- Date of birth: 18 March 1999 (age 27)
- Place of birth: Rio de Janeiro, Brazil
- Height: 1.72 m (5 ft 8 in)
- Position: Midfielder

Team information
- Current team: Avaí
- Number: 8

Youth career
- 2014–2020: Flamengo

Senior career*
Years	Team	Apps	(Gls)
2020	Flamengo	2	(0)
2020–2023	Fortaleza	30	(3)
2021	→ Botafogo (loan)	11	(0)
2022	→ Vasco da Gama (loan)	11	(0)
2023	→ Botafogo-SP (loan)	33	(0)
2024	Goiás	33	(2)
2025	Criciúma	27	(0)
2026–	Avaí	42	(2)
- * Club domestic league appearances and goals as of 18 November 2026

Luiz Henrique Araújo Silva (born 18 March 1999), known as Luiz Henrique, is a Brazilian professional footballer who plays as a midfielder for Avaí.

== Professional career ==
=== Flamengo ===
Luiz Henrique made his professional debut with Flamengo in a 0-0 Campeonato Carioca tie with Macaé on 18 January 2020.

=== Fortaleza ===
On 21 February 2020, Luiz Henrique transferred to Fortaleza on a 2-year contract.

== Career statistics ==
As of 15 November 2021.

Club	Season	League			State League		Cup		Continental		Other		Total	
Club	Season	Division	Apps	Goals	Apps	Goals	Apps	Goals	Apps	Goals	Apps	Goals	Apps	Goals
Flamengo	2020	Série A	0	0	2	0	0	0	—		—		2	0
Fortaleza	2020	Série A	7	0	2	0	0	0	—		0	0	9	0
Fortaleza	2021	Série A	8	0	5	3	3	0	—		5 (Note: Appearance(s) in Copa do Nordeste)	0	21	3
Fortaleza	Total		15	0	7	3	3	0	—		5	0	30	3
Botafogo (loan)	2021	Série B	11	0	—		—		—		—		11	0
Career total			26	0	9	3	3	0	0	0	5	0	43	3

== Honours ==
Fortaleza

- Campeonato Cearense: 2021

Botafogo

- Campeonato Brasileiro Série B: 2021
