= Lucas Campos =

Brazilian footballer

Personal information
- Full name: Lucas da Silva Ribeiro Campos
- Date of birth: 30 October 1997 (age 29)
- Place of birth: Nova Iguaçu, Brazil
- Height: 1.65 m (5 ft 5 in)
- Position: Forward

Senior career*
Years	Team	Apps	(Gls)
2017–2021	Botafogo	16	(0)
2018–2019	→ Nova Iguaçu (loan)	10	(1)
2019	→ Atlético Tubarão (loan)	2	(0)
2021–2022	Valletta	24	(2)
2023	Figueirense	8	(1)
2023–	Nova Iguaçu	17	(2)
- * Club domestic league appearances and goals as of 22:21, 29 February 2024 (UTC)

Lucas da Silva Ribeiro Campos (born 30 October 1997) is a Brazilian footballer who plays as a forward for Nova Iguaçu.

== Career ==
=== Botafogo ===
Campos made his debut for Botafogo against Atlético Goianiense on 23 July 2017.

=== Nova Iguaçu ===
Campos scored on his debut for Nova Iguaçu against Goytacaz on 22 December 2018, scoring in the 11th minute.

=== Atlético Tubarão ===
Campos made his debut for Atlético Tubarão against Figueirense on 2 March 2019.

=== Valletta ===
Campos made his debut for Valletta against Sliema Wanderers on 3 February 2021. He scored his first goal for the club against Balzan on 21 August 2021, scoring in the 43rd minute.

=== Figueirense ===
In 2023, Campos was announced at Figueirense. He made his debut for Figueirense against Concórdia on 18 January 2023. He scored his first goal for the club against Barra on 16 February 2023, scoring in the 52nd minute.

=== Nova Iguaçu ===
Campos made his debut for Nova Iguaçu against Flamengo on 21 January 2024. He scored his first goal for the club against Vasco da Gama on 31 January 2024, scoring in the 89th minute.

== Career statistics ==
=== Club ===
As of 27 November 2019.

Club	Season	League			State League		Cup		Continental		Other		Total	
Club	Season	Division	Apps	Goals	Apps	Goals	Apps	Goals	Apps	Goals	Apps	Goals	Apps	Goals
Botafogo	2017	Série A	1	0	0	0	0	0	—		—		1	0
Botafogo	2018	Série A	0	0	1	0	0	0	—		—		1	0
Botafogo	2019	Série A	9	0	—		—		—		—		9	0
Botafogo	Total		10	0	1	0	0	0	0	0	—		11	0
Nova Iguaçu (loan)	2019	Carioca	—		10	1	—		—		—		10	1
Atlético Tubarão (loan)	2019	Série D	0	0	2	0	—		—		—		2	0
Career total			10	0	13	1	0	0	0	0	0	0	23	1
