= Alfredo Sampaio =

Brazilian footballer and manager (born 1958)

Personal information
- Full name: Alfredo Sampaio
- Date of birth: 23 May 1958 (age 68)
- Place of birth: Rio de Janeiro, Brazil
- Position: Defender

Team information
- Current team: Portuguesa-RJ (head coach)

Senior career*
Years	Team	Apps	(Gls)
1980	America-RJ		
1981	Portuguesa FC		
1982	Fluminense		
1987	São Cristóvão		
1988	Bonsucesso		

Managerial career
- 1990–1993: São Cristóvão
- 1994: Itaperuna
- 1995: Entrerriense
- 1996–1997: Portuguesa-RJ
- 1998–2001: Bangu
- 2002: Portuguesa-RJ
- 2003: America-RJ
- 2004: Portuguesa-RJ
- 2005–2006: Bangu
- 2006: Madureira
- 2007: Avaí
- 2008: Vasco da Gama
- 2009: Cabofriense
- 2010: Americano
- 2011: Boavista
- 2011: Duque de Caxias
- 2012–2013: Boavista
- 2013: Volta Redonda
- 2013: Bangu
- 2014: Bonsucesso
- 2014: Cabofriense
- 2015: Resende
- 2016: Madureira
- 2018–2019: Bangu
- 2020: Cabofriense
- 2021–2022: Madureira
- 2023: America-RJ
- 2024–2025: Sampaio Corrêa-RJ
- 2025: Bangu
- 2026: Sampaio Corrêa-RJ
- 2026–: Portuguesa-RJ
- * Club domestic league appearances and goals

Alfredo Sampaio (born 23 May 1958) is a Brazilian football coach and former player who played as a defender. He is the current head coach of Portuguesa-RJ.

== Playing career ==
He served for 15 years as a defender. He began his career playing futsal. Then played football with the America Football Club in Rio de Janeiro, with his father, who was involved with the club. Yet passed by São Cristóvão and Bonsucesso.

== Post-playing career ==
Always addressed small teams of Rio de Janeiro as São Cristóvão, Bangu, Portuguesa, America, Itaperuna, Entrerriense, Friburguense and Madureira. The Avaí acted in large part of the 2007 Campeonato Brasileiro Série B where his team placed 15th. In 2008, voltaou coach of Madureira, but left the club to be sought to be auxiliary of Romário, who to put an end to fulfil his contract with the Vasco da Gama, and as an assistant coach of Romario and then took over the command of the team.

In 2009, he returned to be coach of Madureira and Cabofriense. in the year 2010, took over the command of the Americano, but has been little time for the club, due to family issues. In 2011, took over the command of the Boavista, where the led up to the end of the bowl Taça Guanabara 2011. Months after he took the Duque de Caxias, for the dispute of Série B, where after negative results in the competition, he was dismissed on 23 June.

In season 2014 he drove two clubs being the first the Bonsucesso and the second the Cabofriense. Already in 2015 hit with the Resende. At the end of 2015, hit again with Madureira in season 2016.

== Honours ==
Portuguesa da Ilha

- Campeonato Carioca Série B: 1996

Madureira

- Taça Rio: 2006

Sampaio Corrêa-RJ

- Taça Rio: 2025

Bangu

- Campeonato Carioca Série A2: 2025
