= Reginaldo (footballer, born 1992) =

Brazilian footballer

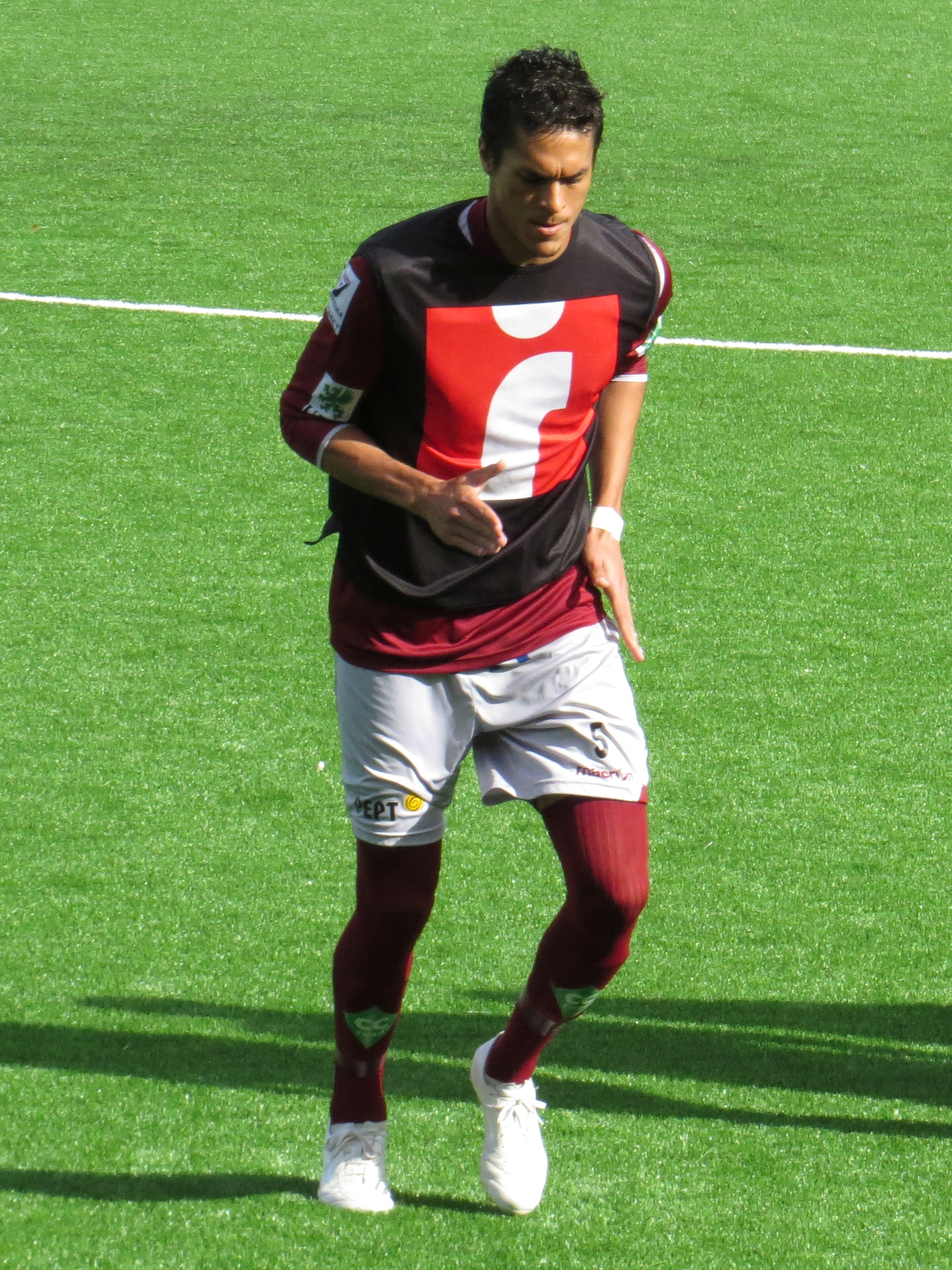
- Reginaldo playing for FF Jaro

Personal information
- Full name: Reginaldo Manoel da Silva Júnior
- Date of birth: 8 July 1992 (age 34)
- Place of birth: Barretos, Brazil
- Height: 1.93 m (6 ft 4 in)
- Position: Defender

Team information
- Current team: Portuguesa-RJ

Youth career
- Rio Preto
- 2011–2013: Fluminense

Senior career*
Years	Team	Apps	(Gls)
2013–2021	Fluminense	27	(2)
2013	→ Resende (loan)	1	(0)
2014	→ Esportivo (loan)	10	(2)
2014	→ Metropolitano (loan)	1	(0)
2015	→ FF Jaro (loan)	22	(0)
2016	→ Vila Nova (loan)	41	(2)
2018–2019	→ Ponte Preta (loan)	56	(3)
2020	→ Botafogo-SP (loan)	5	(0)
2020–2021	→ CRB (loan)	16	(1)
2022	Chapecoense	8	(0)
2022	Botafogo-PB	0	(0)
2023–	Portuguesa-RJ	0	(0)
- * Club domestic league appearances and goals as of 15:27, 10 November 2021 (UTC)

Reginaldo Manoel da Silva Júnior (born 8 July 1992), is a Brazilian footballer who plays for Portuguesa-RJ as a defender.

== Club career ==
Born in Barretos, Reginaldo started his youth career at the academy of Rio Preto Esporte Clube (playing as a forward) before switching to the Fluminense academy in 2011. In 2013, he was loaned out to Resende Futebol Clube and subsequently had loan spells at Clube Esportivo Bento Gonçalves, Clube Atlético Metropolitano and at Finnish club FF Jaro.

On 30 December 2015, Reginaldo was loaned to Série B club Vila Nova Futebol Clube. An undisputed starter; he played 46 matches for the squad and also acted as a captain during the last two rounds of the league.

After returning to Flu in 2017, Reginaldo broke into the main team as a replacement for Ygor Nogueira, after the latter received marching orders. Although he was a starter during the first half of the season; he was soon dropped from the squad after having suffered a muscle injury and was replaced by the pair of Henrique and Renato Chaves. Reginaldo contributed with two goals in 25 matches during the season.

On 20 April 2018, Reginaldo joined second tier club Ponte Preta on a loan deal for the rest of the season. On 5 May, he scored his first goal for the club in a 3–2 victory over Guarani.

== Career statistics ==
As of match played on 10 November 2021

Club	Season	National League			State League		Cup		Continental		Other		Total	
Club	Season	Division	Apps	Goals	Apps	Goals	Apps	Goals	Apps	Goals	Apps	Goals	Apps	Goals
Fluminense	2017	Série A	18	1	5	1	3	0	3 (Note: Appearances in Copa Sudamericana)	0	—		29	2
Fluminense	2018	Série A	0	0	4	1	2	0	—		—		6	1
Fluminense	2021	Série A	0	0	0	0	0	0	—		—		0	0
Fluminense	Total		18	1	9	1	5	0	3	0	—		35	2
Resende (loan)	2013	Carioca	—		1	0	0	0	—		—		1	0
Esportivo (loan)	2014	Gaúcho	—		10	2	0	0	—		—		10	2
Metropolitano (loan)	2014	Série D	1	0	—		—		—		—		1	0
FF Jaro (loan)	2015	Veikkausliiga	22	0	—		2	0	—		—		24	0
Vila Nova (loan)	2016	Série B	30	2	11	0	5	0	—		—		46	2
Ponte Preta (loan)	2018	Série B	22	1	—		—		—		—		22	1
Ponte Preta (loan)	2019	Série B	20	1	14	1	1	0	—		—		35	2
Ponte Preta (loan)	Total		42	2	14	1	1	0	—		—		57	3
Botafogo-SP (loan)	2020	Série B	1	0	4	0	—		—		—		5	0
CRB (loan)	2020	Série B	16	1	—		3	0	—		—		19	1
Career total			130	6	49	5	16	0	3	0	0	0	198	11
