= Bill (footballer, born 1999) =

Brazilian footballer

Personal information
- Full name: Fabricio Rodrigues da Silva Ferreira
- Date of birth: 7 May 1999 (age 27)
- Place of birth: Belford Roxo, Brazil
- Height: 1.75 m (5 ft 9 in)
- Position: Winger

Team information
- Current team: Nova Iguaçu

Youth career
- –2015: Nova Iguaçu
- 2015–2019: Flamengo

Senior career*
Years	Team	Apps	(Gls)
2019–2021	Flamengo	4	(1)
2019	→ Ponte Preta (loan)	10	(1)
2020–2021	→ CRB (loan)	28	(4)
2021	→ Dnipro-1 (loan)	5	(0)
2022–2024	Dnipro-1	15	(1)
2022	→ Sport Recife (loan)	9	(1)
2022	→ RFS (loan)	6	(0)
2023	→ Inter de Limeira (loan)	9	(0)
2023	→ Sampaio Corrêa (loan)	7	(0)
2024–	Nova Iguaçu	14	(4)
- * Club domestic league appearances and goals as of 17 March 2025

Fabricio Rodrigues da Silva Ferreira (born 7 May 1999), commonly known as Bill, is a Brazilian footballer who plays as a winger for Nova Iguaçu.

== Career ==
=== Flamengo ===
Bill made his debut for Flamengo against Vasco da Gama on 31 March 2019. He scored his first goal for the club against Volta Redonda on 25 January 2020, scoring in the 90th minute.

=== Ponte Preta ===
Bill made his debut for Ponte Preta against Red Bull Bragantino on 24 July 2019. He scored his first goal for the club against Brasil de Pelotas on 26 November 2019, scoring in the 18th minute.

=== CRB ===
Bill made his debut for CRB against Ceará on 23 July 2020. He scored his first goal for the club against Sampaio Corrêa on 2 September 2020, scoring in the 77th minute.

=== Loan to Dnipro-1 ===
During his loan, Bill made his debut for Dnipro-1 against FC Lviv on 2 April 2021.

=== Dnipro-1 ===
Bill made his debut for Dnipro-1 against Chornomorets on 31 July 2021. He scored his first goal for the club against FC Mariupol on 10 December 2021, scoring in the 78th minute.

=== Sport Recife ===
Bill scored on his debut for Sport Recife against Fortaleza on 1 April 2022, scoring in the 90+2nd minute.

=== Rigas ===
Bill made his league debut for Rigas against Valmiera on 21 August 2022.

=== Inter de Limeira ===
Bill made his league debut for Inter de Limeira against Portuguesa on 5 February 2023.

=== Sampaio Corrêa ===
Bill made his league debut for Sampaio Corrêa against Atlético Goianiense on 15 April 2023.

=== Nova Iguaçu ===
Bill made his league debut for Nova Iguaçu against Flamengo on 21 January 2024. He scored his first goal for the club against Bangu on 24 January 2024, scoring in the 13th minute.

== Career statistics ==
=== Club ===
As of 7 November 2021

Club	Season	League			State League		Cup		Continental		Other		Total	
Club	Season	Division	Apps	Goals	Apps	Goals	Apps	Goals	Apps	Goals	Apps	Goals	Apps	Goals
Flamengo	2019	Série A	1	0	1 (Note: Appearances in Campeonato Carioca.)	0	0	0	0	0	—		2	0
Flamengo	2020	Série A	0	0	2	1	0	0	0	0	—		2	1
Flamengo	Total		1	0	3	1	0	0	0	0	—		4	1
Ponte Preta (loan)	2019	Série B	10	1	—		0	0	—		—		10	1
CRB (loan)	2020	Série B	25	4	4 (Note: Appearance(s) in Campeonato Alagoano.)	0	2	0	—		4 (Note: Appearance(s) in Copa do Nordeste.)	0	31	4
Dnipro-1 (loan)	2020–21	Ukrainian Premier League	5	0	—		0	0	—		—		5	0
Dnipro-1 (loan)	2021–22	Ukrainian Premier League	8	0	—		1	0	—		—		9	0
Dnipro-1 (loan)	Total		13	0	—		1	0	—		—		14	0
Career total			49	5	7	1	3	0	0	0	0	0	59	6
