= Carlos Vitor =

Brazilian football coach and former player (born 1971)

Personal information
- Full name: Carlos Alberto Carreiro de Carvalho
- Date of birth: 5 August 1971 (age 55)
- Place of birth: Rio de Janeiro, Brazil

Team information
- Current team: Nova Iguaçu (head coach)

Youth career
- Campo Grande

Senior career*
Years	Team	Apps	(Gls)
1992–1999	Nova Iguaçu		

Managerial career
- 2000–2014: Nova Iguaçu (youth)
- 2011: Nova Iguaçu (interim)
- 2014: Nova Iguaçu (interim)
- 2014: Nova Iguaçu
- 2015: Nova Iguaçu (assistant)
- 2015: Nova Iguaçu
- 2016–2019: Nova Iguaçu (assistant)
- 2019–2020: Nova Iguaçu
- 2020: Nova Iguaçu (assistant)
- 2021: Nova Iguaçu U20
- 2021–: Nova Iguaçu
- * Club domestic league appearances and goals

Carlos Alberto Carreiro de Carvalho (born 5 August 1971), known as Carlos Vitor, is a Brazilian football coach and former player. He is the current head coach of Nova Iguaçu.

== Playing career ==
Born and raised in Cordovil, a neighborhood in the north zone of Rio de Janeiro, Carlos played youth football for Campo Grande and received the "surname" of Vitor in 1992, after being spotted by Nova Iguaçu president Vitor Meirelles. Often called as "Carlos indicated by Vitor", he later became "Carlos Vitor".

At Nova Iguaçu, Carlos Vitor played for eight seasons before retiring in 1999, and won the 1994 Campeonato Carioca Segunda Divisão.

== Coaching career ==
After retiring, Carlos Vitor started working with the under-12 side of his main club Nova Iguaçu, and went on to manage the club in several youth categories. He became an interim head coach of the club in October 2011, after Zinho left, and managed the side in their last match of the year's Copa Rio.

Carlos Vitor subsequently returned to the youth categories, being also an assistant in the main squad, before again becoming an interim on 17 March 2014, after Edson Souza was sacked. He was in charge of the club during a 1–1 draw against Botafogo five days later, before returning to his previous role after the appointment of Marcelo Salles.

On 8 September 2014, Carlos Vitor was named head coach of the Carrossel da Baixada for the remainder of the Copa Rio, after Salles left for Vasco da Gama. Back to his assistant role for the 2015 season, he was named head coach of Nova Iguaçu on 5 April 2015, replacing Renê Weber.

Carlos Vitor remained in charge of Nova Iguaçu during the 2015 Copa Rio, but was replaced by Edson Souza for the 2016 season and returned to his assistant role. On 4 February 2019, he was again named interim head coach after Salles was dismissed, and was in charge of the club for the remaining three matches of the 2019 Campeonato Carioca, achieving three wins which helped the club avoid relegation; he spent the rest of the year in charge of the under-15s.

Carlos Vitor was dismissed from his head coach role on 10 January 2020, and returned to his assistant role before being again named head coach on 28 December. After leading the club to mid-table positions in the following three seasons, he led the club to the finals of the 2024 Campeonato Carioca.

== Managerial statistics ==
As of match played 26 June 2025

Managerial record by team and tenure
Team	Nat	From	To	Record							
Team	Nat	From	To	G	W	D	L	GF	GA	GD	Win %
Nova Iguaçu (interim)	(Brazil)	2011	2011	6	1	1	4	11	11	+0	16.67
Nova Iguaçu (interim)	(Brazil)	14 March 2014	14 March 2014	1	0	1	0	1	1	+0	0.00
Nova Iguaçu	(Brazil)	8 September 2014	30 November 2014	5	2	1	2	6	7	−1	40.00
Nova Iguaçu	(Brazil)	5 April 2015	30 October 2015	11	2	2	7	10	18	−8	18.18
Nova Iguaçu	(Brazil)	4 February 2019	23 February 2019	7	4	0	3	11	8	+3	57.14
Nova Iguaçu	(Brazil)	28 December 2020	present	153	58	48	47	169	168	+1	37.91
Career total				183	67	53	63	208	213	−5	36.61

== Honours ==
=== Player ===
Nova Iguaçu

- Campeonato Carioca Segunda Divisão: 1994
