= Kelvyn (footballer) =

Brazilian footballer (born 1999)

Personal information
- Full name: Kelvyn Ramos da Fonseca
- Date of birth: 7 May 1999 (age 27)
- Place of birth: Osasco, Brazil
- Position: Left back

Team information
- Current team: Confiança

Youth career
- 2016: Internacional
- 2016: → SER Santa Rosa (loan)
- 2016–2019: Atlético Tubarão
- 2019: → Ceará (loan)

Senior career*
Years	Team	Apps	(Gls)
2018–2020	Atlético Tubarão	0	(0)
2019–2020	→ Ceará (loan)	3	(0)
2020–2024	Ceará	35	(3)
2023	→ Ferroviária (loan)	8	(0)
2023	→ Juventude (loan)	16	(0)
2024	→ Chapecoense (loan)	3	(0)
2025	Caxias	18	(0)
2026–	Confiança	19	(0)
- * Club domestic league appearances and goals as of 11 November 2026

Kelvyn Ramos da Fonseca (born 7 May 1999), simply known as Kelvyn, is a Brazilian footballer who plays for Confiança. Mainly a left back, he can also play as a defensive midfielder.

== Club career ==
Born in Osasco, São Paulo, Kelvyn joined Internacional after a trial period in 2016, but was subsequently loaned to SER Santa Rosa before joining Atlético Tubarão's under-20 squad. He made his debut for the latter's first team on 30 September 2018, starting in a 5–1 Copa Santa Catarina home routing of Operário de Mafra.

In 2019, Kelvyn joined Ceará on loan, initially for their under-20 squad. On 29 April 2020, after appearing with the main squad, he signed a permanent contract until December 2021.

Kelvyn made his Série A debut on 4 October 2020, by coming on as a second-half substitute for Alyson in a 1–2 away loss against Palmeiras. His first goal in the category came on 14 November, as he scored his team's first in a 2–4 loss at Grêmio.

== Career statistics ==
As of 29 March 2023

Club	Season	League			State League		Cup		Continental		Other		Total	
Club	Season	Division	Apps	Goals	Apps	Goals	Apps	Goals	Apps	Goals	Apps	Goals	Apps	Goals
Atlético Tubarão	2018	Série D	0	0	0	0	0	0	—		1 (Note: Appearance(s) in Copa Santa Catarina)	0	1	0
Ceará	2019	Série A	0	0	0	0	0	0	—		8 (Note: Appearance(s) in Copa Fares Lopes)	0	8	0
Ceará	2020	Série A	16	2	3	0	2	0	—		1 (Note: Appearance(s) in Copa do Nordeste)	0	22	2
Ceará	2021	Série A	16	1	3	0	0	0	2 (Note: Appearance(s) in Copa Sudamericana)	0	4	0	25	1
Ceará	2022	Série A	2	0	2	0	0	0	3	0	4	1	11	1
Ceará	2023	Série B	0	0	0	0	0	0	—		0	0	0	0
Ceará	Total		34	3	8	0	2	0	5	0	17	1	66	4
Ferroviária (loan)	2023	Série D	0	0	8	0	—		—		—		8	0
Career total			34	3	16	0	2	0	5	0	18	1	75	4

== Honours ==
Ceará

- Copa do Nordeste: 2020
