= Madureira Esporte Clube =

Brazilian association football club

Madureira
- Full name: Madureira Esporte Clube
- Nicknames: Tricolor Suburbano (Suburban Tricolor); Madura
- Founded: 8 August 1914; 112 years ago
- Ground: Estádio Conselheiro Galvão
- Capacity: 4,272
- President: Elias José Duba Neto
- Head coach: Alfredo Sampaio
- League: Campeonato Brasileiro Série D Campeonato Carioca
- 2025: Carioca, 6th of 12
Home colors	Away colors

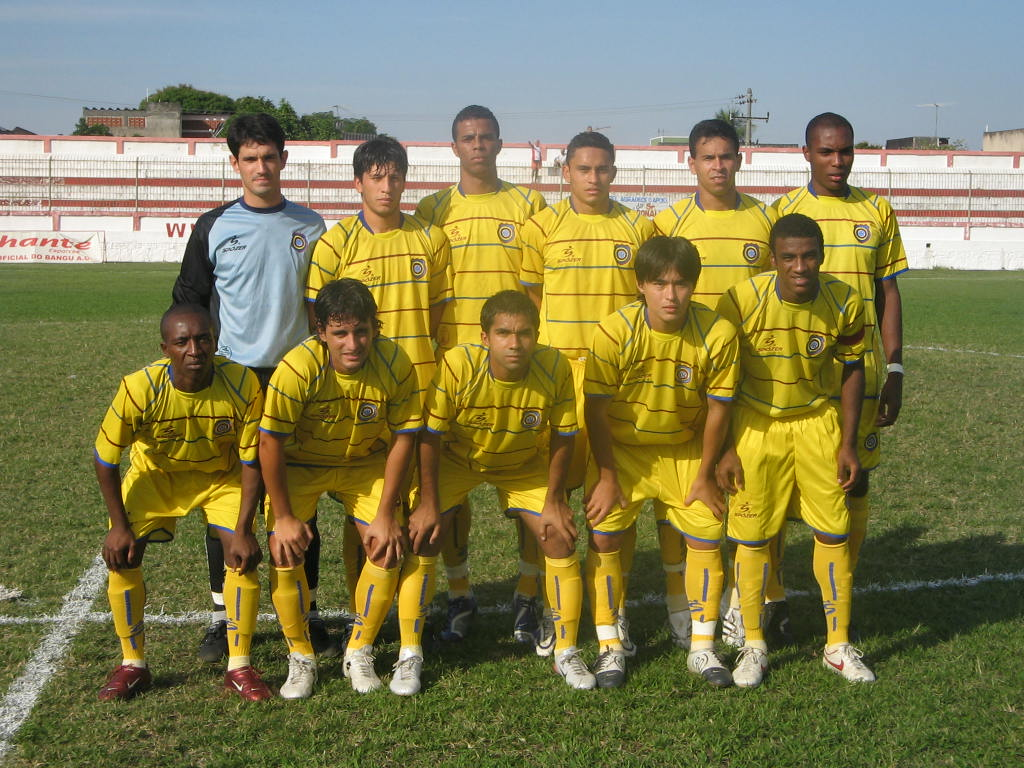
Team photo from the 2007 season

Madureira Esporte Clube, usually abbreviated to Madureira, is a Brazilian football team based in the city of Rio de Janeiro, in the neighbourhood of Madureira. The team compete in Campeonato Carioca, the top tier of the Rio de Janeiro state football league.

== History ==
Madureira was founded on August 8, 1914 as Fidalgo Madureira Atlético Clube. The businessmen Elísio Alves Ferreira, Manoel Lopes da Silva, Manuel Augusto Maia and Joaquim Braia, among others, in 1932, wanted to found a strong club in Madureira neighborhood. They contacted Uassir do Amaral, president of Fidalgo Madureira Atlético Clube at that time. In the same year, they tried to fuse Fidalgo and Magno Futebol Clube, but the partners of Fidalgo did not approve this. After several assemblies, on February 16, 1933, the team was named Madureira Atlético Clube, and the foundation date was determined to be August 8, 1914 (the same foundation date of Fidalgo Madureira Atlético Clube).

Madureira competed in the Federação Metropolitana de Futebol (Metropolitan Football Federation) state championship in 1939, winning the amateur competition and the Torneio Início, which is disputed by professional players.

Madureira Esporte Clube was founded on October 12, 1971, after Madureira Atlético Clube, Madureira Tênis Clube, and Imperial Basquete Clube fused. The foundation date was determined to be, again, August 8, 1914.

Madureira beat Americano 1–0 on March 29, 2006, winning the Taça Rio for the first time, and qualifying to play the Campeonato Estadual do Rio de Janeiro final against Botafogo. In the final, played on April 2, 2006 and on April 9, 2006 the club was defeated in both legs, finishing as the competition runner-up.

In 2013, the club featured Che Guevara's portrait on their shirts to commemorate a tour of the island they made 50 years ago. The goalkeeper’s jersey featured the flag of Cuba.

== Honours ==
=== Official tournaments ===
State
Competitions	Titles	Seasons
Copa Rio	1	2011

=== Others tournaments ===
==== State ====
- Taça Rio (2): 2006, 2015
- Troféu Carlos Alberto Torres (1): 2011
- Torneio Início (2): 1939, 1947

=== Runners-up ===
- Campeonato Brasileiro Série D (1): 2010
- Campeonato Carioca (3): 1936, 1937, 2006
- Copa Rio (3): 1999, 2009, 2014
- Campeonato Carioca Série A2 (2): 1933, 1980

== Stadium and real properties ==
Madureira's home stadium is the Estádio Conselheiro Galvão, which has a maximum capacity of 10,000 people.

30 (thirty) real properties are owned by Madureira. The income generated by these properties are used to pay the club's obligations, like the player's wages.

== Former Players ==
(Brazil) Jacksen F. Tiago (1991)

== Current squad ==
As of August 23, 2023 Note: Flags indicate national team as defined under FIFA eligibility rules; some limited exceptions apply. Players may hold more than one non-FIFA nationality.

No.	Pos.	Nation	Player
—	GK	BRA	Guilherme Cabo
—	DF	BRA	Pedro Cavalini
—	DF	BRA	Eisy
—	DF	BRA	Fabricio
—	DF	BRA	Guilherme Zoio
—	DF	BRA	Kadu
—	DF	BRA	Marcão
—	DF	BRA	Oliveira
—	DF	BRA	Wagner Iguatu
—	MF	BRA	Fabio Paulista
—	MF	BRA	Leoni Gastaldelo

No.	Pos.	Nation	Player
—	MF	BRA	Henrique
—	MF	BRA	Jonnathan Luís
—	MF	BRA	Thiago Marques
—	MF	BRA	Vitor Rocha
—	MF	BRA	Yan Tanque
—	FW	BRA	Douglas Cunha
—	FW	BRA	Guilherme Augusto
—	FW	BRA	Gustavo
—	FW	BRA	Léo Loureiro
—	FW	HKG	Sandro

== Symbols ==
The club's colors, blue, purple and yellow, represent, respectively, Fidalgo Madureira Atlético Clube, Madureira Tênis Clube and Imperial Basquete Clube. Madureira's anthem was composed by Lamartine Babo, who also composed the anthems for the big clubs of Rio de Janeiro.
