= Associação Atlética Portuguesa (RJ) =

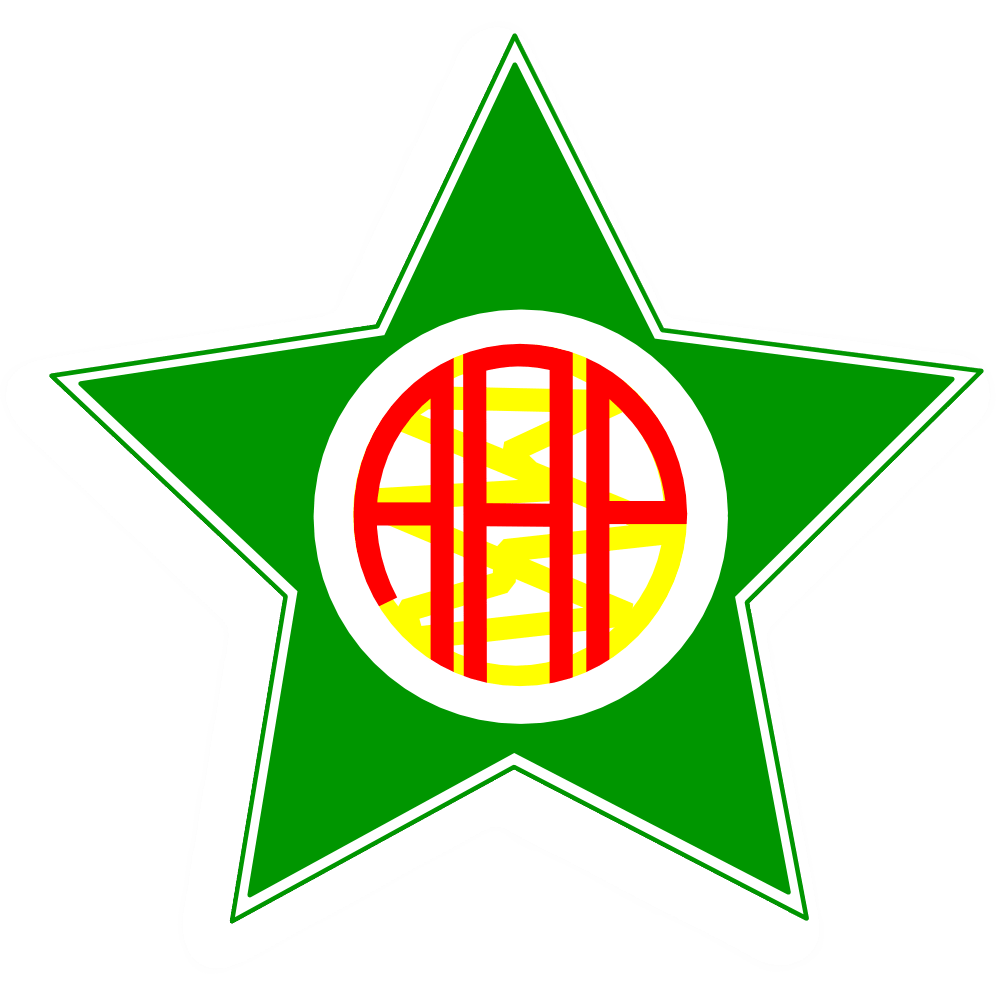
- Full name: Associação Atlética Portuguesa
- Nicknames: Lusa Carioca (Rio's Lusa); Rubro-Verde (The Red & Green); Portuguesa da Ilha (The Island's Portuguesa)
- Founded: 17 December 1924; 101 years ago
- Ground: Estádio Luso Brasileiro
- Capacity: 5,994
- Chairman: João Maria do Rêgo Gonçalves
- Head coach: Alex Nascif
- League: Campeonato Brasileiro Série D Campeonato Carioca
- 2025: Carioca, 11th of 12
- Website: www.aaportuguesario.com.br
Home colours	Away colours

Associação Atlética Portuguesa, also known as Portuguesa Carioca, Portuguesa do Rio or Portuguesa da Ilha, and also nicknamed Lusa, is a Brazilian professional association football club based in Governador Island, Rio de Janeiro. The team plays in Série D, the fourth tier of the Brazilian football league system, as well as in the Campeonato Carioca, the top tier of the Rio de Janeiro state football league.

== History ==
After a long tour of Rio de Janeiro and Portugal, Constantino Paiva and Joaquim Martins Leal, businessmen in the empty and used bag business, were invited to play a football match at the organized Portuguesa Santista against their colleagues and employees from the Santos area. The result was 1-1 and the two Cariocas, who had Portuguese ancestry and were passionate about Portugal, returned to Rio de Janeiro and told other businessmen about their journey. After this trip, Constantino and Joaquim convinced Rio de Janeiro's bag traders to such an extent that they decided to create Associação Atlética Portuguesa. Bosses and employees came together and formed the sports club. On 17 December 1924, in the home of Luís Gomes Teixeira, the Associação Atlética Portuguesa was founded. Luiz Gomes Teixeira is known as Portuguesa's first president. Its first headquarters were at Rua Visconde de Itaúna, 201, in the city center, a street that would be demolished in the 1940s for the opening of Avenida Presidente Vargas. As a result of the demolition of its first headquarters, Portuguesa went in search of a new home. It would found its new headquarters in the Ilha do Governador with its address at Rua Haroldo Lobo. At the chosen location, already on the island, there was a jockey stadium, with horse racing. Years later, the jockey stadium would go bankrupt and become the permanent home of Portuguesa. The stadium would take on the traditional name of Luso-Brasileiro, which years later would become one of the most important stadiums in Rio de Janeiro, home to the state's greatest teams and the stage for memorable matches. Three years after its foundation, in 1927, it joined the first professional league of teams in Rio de Janeiro. The team had good results in various championships such as those of 1931, 1934 and 1937. On the national stage, Portuguesa played in the C series twice, in 2003 and 2004, and the D series in 2016. In the 2000s, Portuguesa won their first Rio Cup, in 2000, beating Sampaio Correa 4-1 at the Luso Brasileiro stadium. In 2015, Portuguesa finally managed to return to the elite of Rio de Janeiro football after some serious and consistent work by manager João Rêgo. In 2016, the club once again competed in a national championship, the Brasileirão Série D. In the same year, Lusa won the Rio Cup for the second time at Luso, beating Friburguense 4-3.

== Roster ==
=== First team squad ===
As of 18 November 2023

Note: Flags indicate national team as defined under FIFA eligibility rules; some limited exceptions apply. Players may hold more than one non-FIFA nationality.

No.	Pos.	Nation	Player
—	DF	BRA	Reginaldo Júnior
—	GK	BRA	Luciano
—	GK	BRA	Neguete
—	DF	BRA	Watson
—	DF	BRA	Gabriel Cunha
—	DF	BRA	Pedro
—	DF	BRA	Juan Mello
—	DF	BRA	Luis Gustavo
—	DF	BRA	Danilo
—	DF	BRA	Magdiel
—	DF	BRA	Dilsinho
—	MF	BRA	Cafu
—	MF	BRA	Patrick Valverde
—	MF	BRA	Robert
—	MF	BRA	Lukinhas
—	MF	BRA	Muniz
—	MF	BRA	Everton Heleno
—	MF	BRA	Rafael Pernão

No.	Pos.	Nation	Player
—	MF	BRA	Romário Costa
—	MF	BRA	Lucas Santos
—	MF	BRA	Wellington Cézar
—	MF	BRA	Mauro Silva
—	FW	BRA	Hugo Cabral
—	FW	BRA	Joelisson
—	FW	BRA	Lucas Guimarães
—	FW	BRA	Matheus Chaveirinho
—	FW	BRA	Douglas Eskilo
—	FW	BRA	Netinho
—	FW	BRA	Jhulliam
—	FW	BRA	Felipe Camacho
—	FW	BRA	Emerson Carioca

== Stadium ==
Portuguesa's home stadium is Estádio Luso Brasileiro, built in 1965, with a maximum capacity of 4,697 spectators. Portuguesa's stadium is sometimes used by two first division teams from Rio de Janeiro, Flamengo and Botafogo.

== Symbols ==
The team mascot is a zebra.

== Honours ==
=== Official tournaments ===
State
Competitions	Titles	Seasons
Copa Rio	4	2000, 2016, 2023, 2025
Campeonato Carioca Série A2	5	1939, 1940, 1996, 2000, 2003

=== Others tournaments ===
==== International ====
- Brazil-Angola International Tournament (1): 2002

==== National ====
- Copa Rubro–Verde (2): 2018, 2019

==== State ====
- Taça Santos Dumont (1): 2015
- Torneio Extra Capital (1): 2015

=== Runners-up ===
- Copa Rio (3): 2015, 2019, 2022
- Campeonato Carioca Série A2 (5): 1981, 1984, 1990, 1997, 2015
