= Nova Iguaçu FC =

Association football club in Brazil

Nova Iguaçu
- Full name: Nova Iguaçu Futebol Clube
- Nickname: Carrossel da Baixada
- Founded: 1 April 1990; 36 years ago
- Ground: Estádio Jânio Moraes
- Capacity: 5,000
- President: Jânio Moraes
- Head coach: Carlos Vitor
- League: Campeonato Brasileiro Série D Campeonato Carioca
- 2025 2025: Série D, 47th of 64; Carioca, 7th of 12
- Website: nifc.com.br
Home colors	Away colors	colors

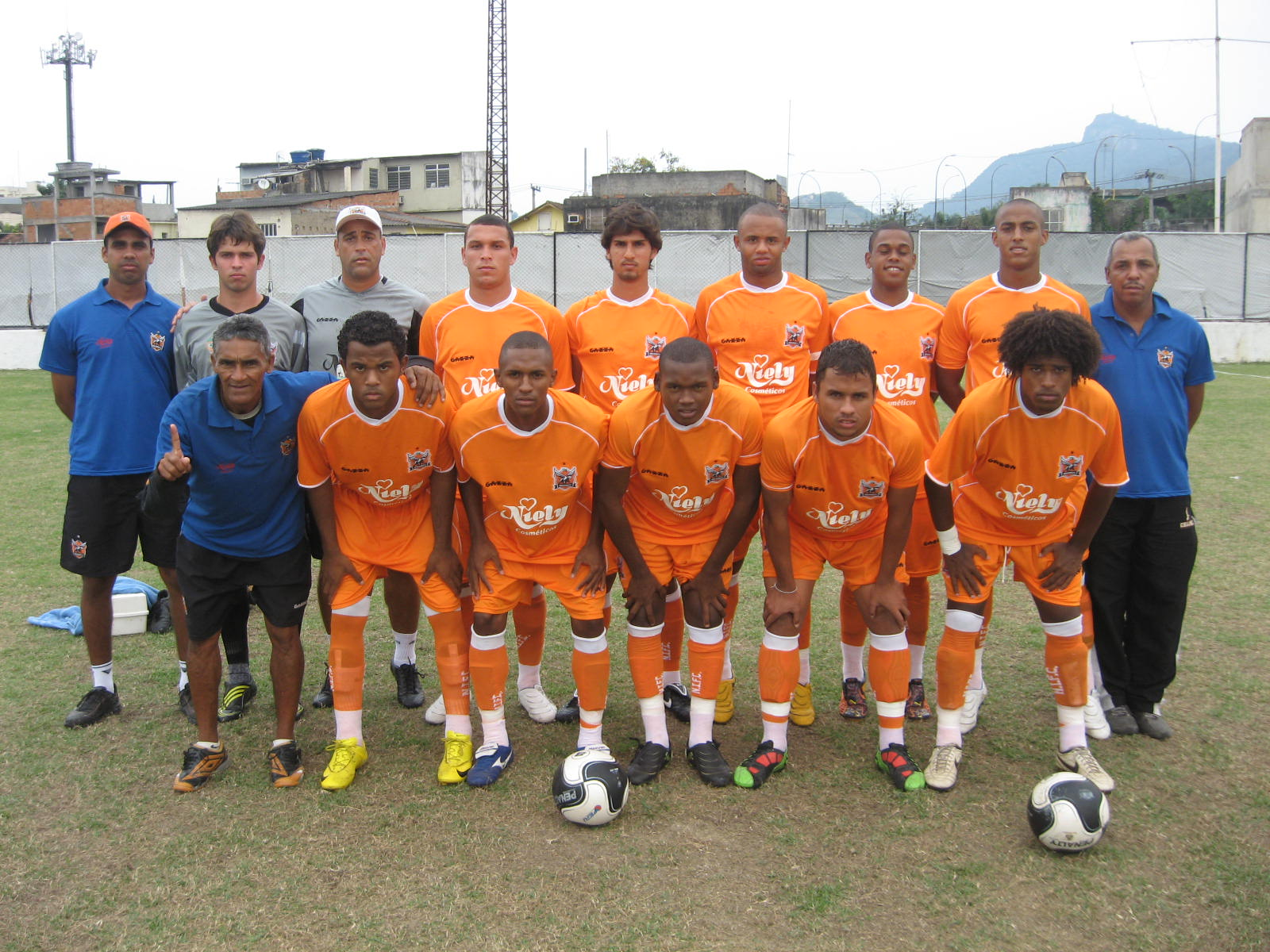
Team photo from the 2010 season

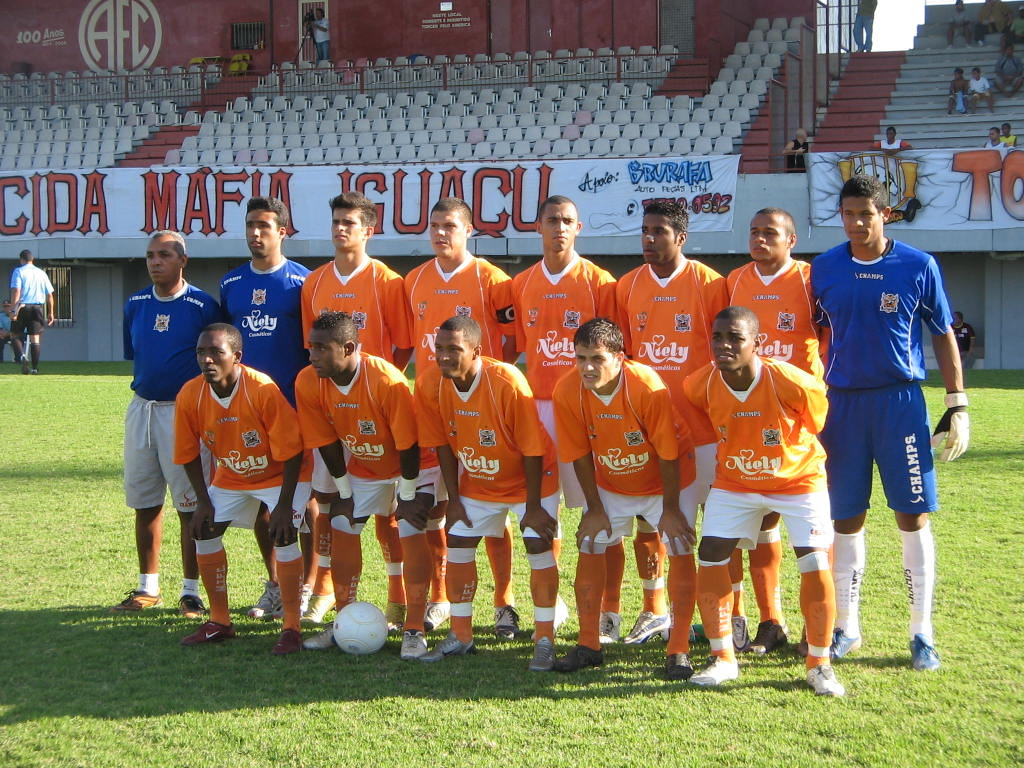
Team photo from the 2008 season

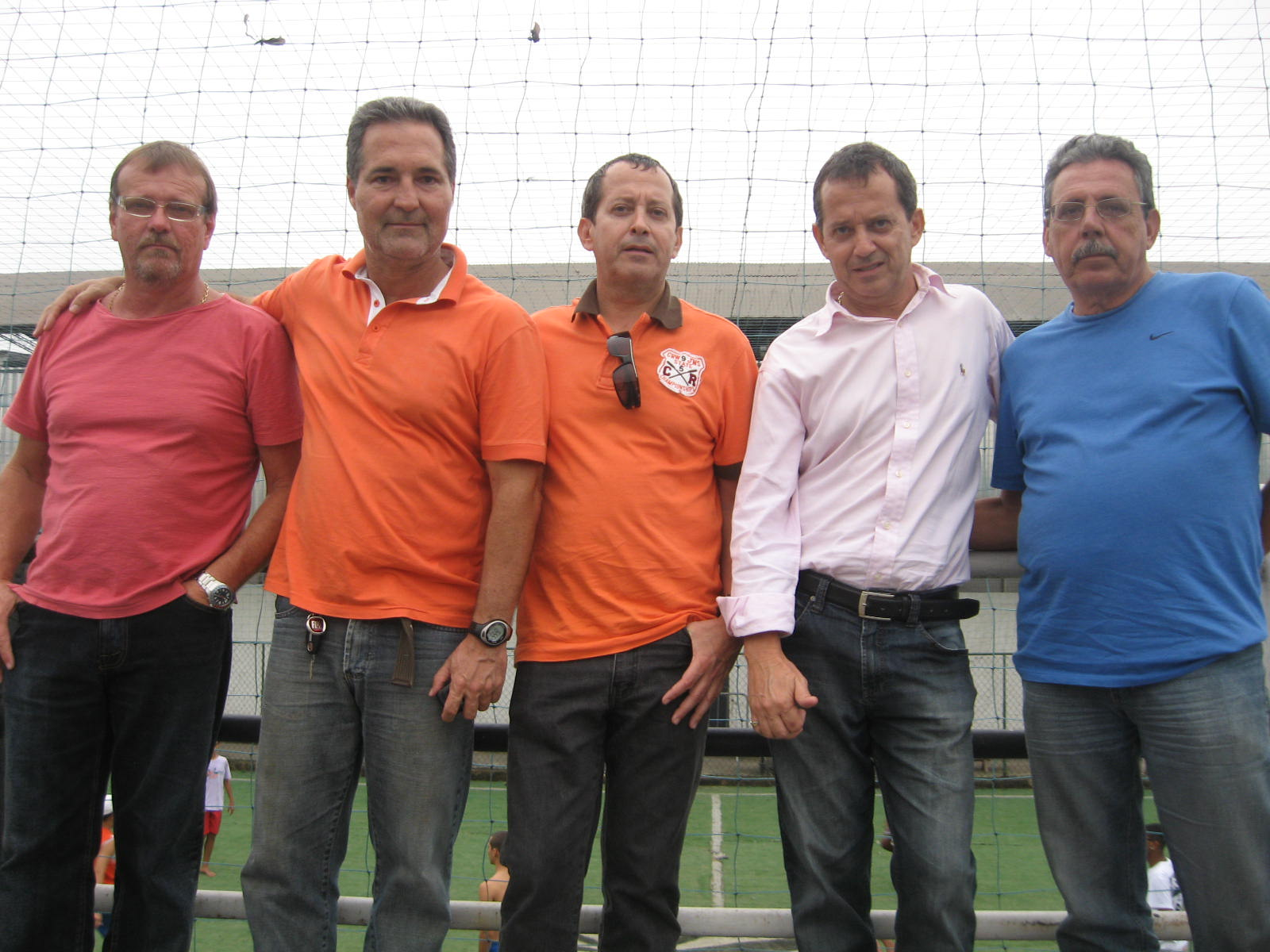
Club directors

Nova Iguaçu Futebol Clube, or Nova Iguaçu as they are usually called, is a Brazilian football team from Nova Iguaçu in Rio de Janeiro, founded on 1 April 1990.

Nova Iguaçu greatest rival is from the same city: Artsul.

Home stadium is the Jânio Moraes stadium, capacity 16,000. They play in orange shirts, white shorts and orange socks.

== History ==
Nova Iguaçu Futebol Clube was founded on 1 April 1990, by the initiative of 25 self-employed persons, led by Jânio Moraes. The foundation project was idealized in 1988/1989, by Jânio Moraes, and supported by the 25 self-employed people. 1994 World Cup champion Zinho is one of the founders of the club and was a director-partner of the club.

In 1994, only four years after the club's foundation, Nova Iguaçu won the Campeonato Carioca Third Level, and gained promotion to the state championship second level.

In 2005, after a successful campaign, Nova Iguaçu won the Campeonato Carioca Série A2 and was promoted to the 2006 Campeonato Carioca First Division.

On 14 January 2006 Nova Iguaçu played their first ever Campeonato Carioca first division match, against the major club Flamengo, at Estádio Raulino de Oliveira, where the club won 1-0. However, Flamengo's players were alternates.

On 21 June 2008 the club won the Copa Rio for the first time, after beating Americano 3-2 at Estádio Godofredo Cruz, Campos dos Goytacazes, home of the opponent club.

== Honours ==
=== Official tournaments ===
State
Competitions	Titles	Seasons
Copa Rio	2	2008, 2012
Campeonato Carioca Série A2	3	2005, 2016, 2020
Campeonato Carioca Série B1	1	1994

=== Others tournaments ===
==== State ====
- Torneio Independência (1): 2022
- Troféu Edilson Silva (1): 2012
- Quadrangular Extra da Taça GB (1): 2017
- Quadrangular Extra da Taça Rio (1): 2017
- Taça Santos Dumont (2): 2016, 2020

==== City ====
- Campeonato Iguaçuano (1): 2005

=== Runners-up ===
- Campeonato Carioca (1): 2024
- Campeonato Carioca Série A2 (1): 2010
- Copa Rio (1): 2026

== Stadium ==
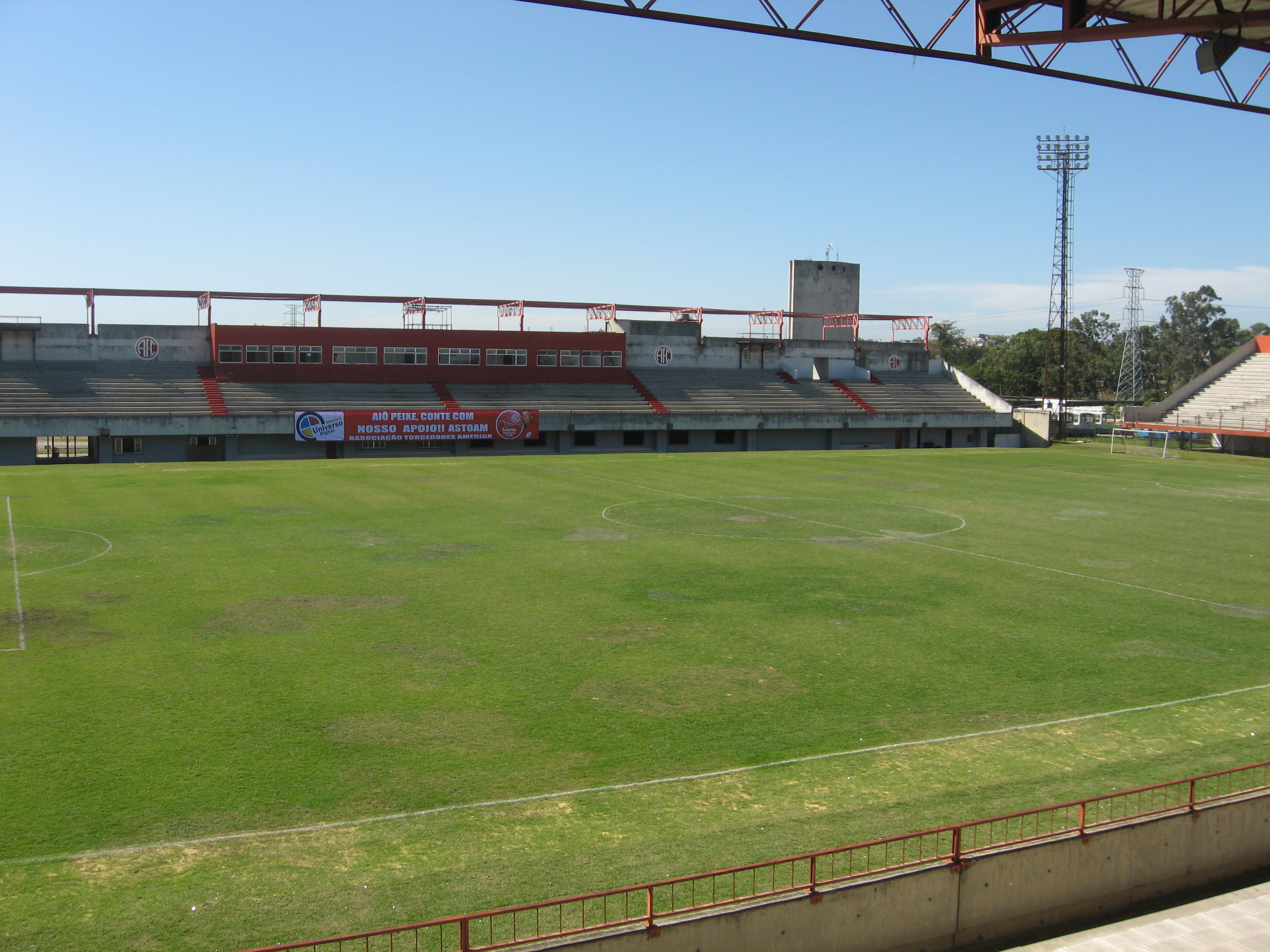
Estádio Giulite Coutinho

Nova Iguaçu's home stadium is Estádio Jânio Moraes, also known as Estádio Laranjão, inaugurated in 2009, with a maximum capacity of 5,000 people.

Nova Iguaçu's previously home stadium was Estádio Giulite Coutinho, also known as Estádio Édson Passos, inaugurated in 2000, with a maximum capacity of 16,000 people.

== Club colors and nickname ==
The club is affectionately known as "Carrossel da Baixada" (Baixada's Carrousel), in reference to the team color (orange), similar to the color of the Netherlands' 1974 World Cup team (known as the Dutch Carrousel). The color adopted by the club was orange, in honor to the period (in the 1930s) when Nova Iguaçu city was one of the biggest orange exporters in the world (the fruit still is one of the city symbols).
