= Sampaio Corrêa Futebol e Esporte =

Sampaio Corrêa
- Full name: Sampaio Corrêa Futebol e Esporte
- Nickname: Galinho da Serra
- Founded: 20 February 2006; 20 years ago
- Ground: Estádio Lourival Gomes, Saquarema, Rio de Janeiro, Brazil
- Capacity: 5,000
- President: Ronan Carvalho de Almeida
- Head Coach: Alfredo Sampaio
- League: Campeonato Brasileiro Série D Campeonato Carioca
- 2025: Carioca, 5th of 12
| Home colours | Away colours |

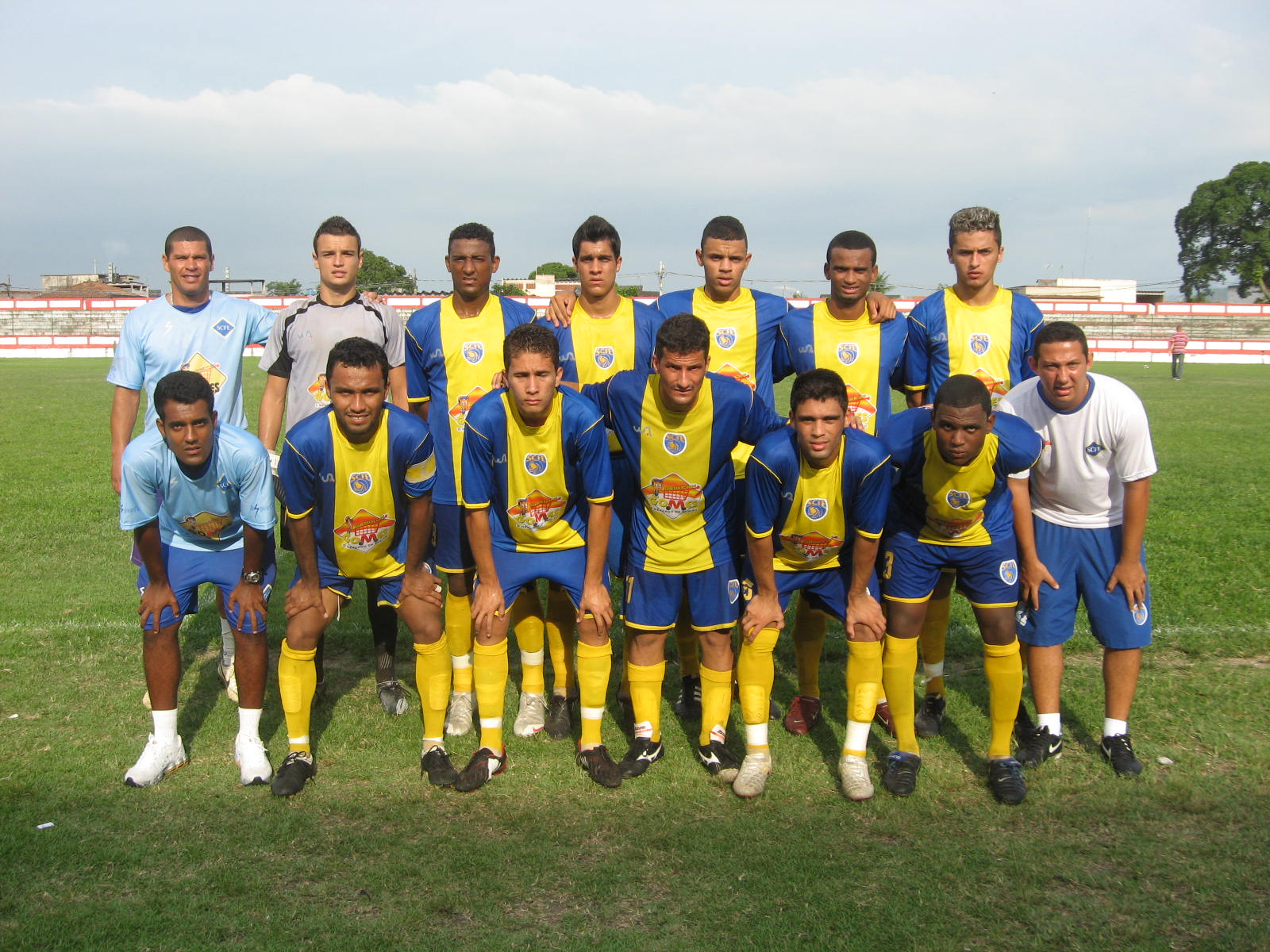
Team photo from the 2009 season

Sampaio Corrêa Futebol e Esporte, commonly known as Sampaio Corrêa, is a Brazilian football club based in Saquarema, Rio de Janeiro state.

== History ==
The club was founded on February 20, 2006. Sampaio Corrêa won the Campeonato Carioca Third Level in 2009.

== Honours ==
- Campeonato Carioca Série A2
  - Winners (1): 2023
- Campeonato Carioca Série B1
  - Winners (1): 2009
- Taça Rio
  - Winners (1): 2025
- Torneio Interior
  - Winners (1): 2015

== Stadium ==
Sampaio Corrêa Futebol e Esporte play their home games at Estádio Elcyr Resende de Mendonça. The stadium has a maximum capacity of 10,000 people.
