= 2021 CR Flamengo season =

Flamengo
2021 season
- President: Rodolfo Landim
- Head coach: Rogério Ceni (until 10 July 2021); Renato Gaúcho (since 10 July 2021 – until 29 November 2021); Maurício de Souza (caretaker, 29 November 2021)
- Stadium: Estádio do Maracanã
- Série A: 2nd
- Campeonato Carioca: Winners
- Copa do Brasil: Semi-finals
- Supercopa do Brasil: Winners
- Copa Libertadores: Runners-up
- Top goalscorer: League: Michael (14 goals); All: Gabriel Barbosa (34 goals)
- Highest home attendance: 48,981 (17 November 2021 vs. Corinthians)
- Lowest home attendance: 5,518 (21 July 2021 vs. Defensa y Justicia)
- Average home league attendance: 17,199
Home colours	Away colours	Third colours

The 2021 season is Clube de Regatas do Flamengo's 126th year of existence, their 110th football season, and their 51st in the Campeonato Brasileiro Série A, having never been relegated from the top division. In addition to the 2021 Campeonato Brasileiro Série A, Flamengo will also compete in the CONMEBOL Copa Libertadores, the Copa do Brasil, and the Campeonato Carioca, the top tier of Rio de Janeiro's state football league and Supercopa do Brasil.

== Kits ==
Supplier: Adidas / Sponsor: Banco BRB / Back of the shirt: Mercado Livre / Lower back: TotalEnergies / Shoulder: Sportsbet.io / Sleeves: Havan / Numbers: TIM / Shorts: ABC da Construção / Socks: MOSS

Home	Home alternate	Away	Away alternate	Away alternate 2	Third
Goalkeeper	Goalkeeper alternate	Goalkeeper alternate 2

== Pre-season and friendlies ==
Due to the reorganization of the Brazilian calendar caused by the COVID-19 pandemic, the 2021 season started just a week after the end of the 2020 season, making any kind of pre-season or friendly scheduling impossible.

== Competitions ==
=== Overview ===
Competition	First match	Last match	Starting round	Final position	Record							
Competition	First match	Last match	Starting round	Final position	Pld	W	D	L	GF	GA	GD	Win %
Série A	30 May 2021	9 December 2021	Matchday 1	Runners-up	38	21	8	9	69	36	+33	55.26
Copa do Brasil	10 June 2021	27 October 2021	Third round	Semi-finals	8	6	1	1	18	5	+13	75.00
Campeonato Carioca	2 March 2021	22 May 2021	Matchday 1	Winners	15	10	3	2	34	13	+21	66.67
Copa Libertadores	20 April 2021	27 November 2021	Group stage	Runners-up	13	9	3	1	33	14	+19	69.23
Supercopa do Brasil	11 April 2021		Final	Winners	1	0	1	0	2	2	+0	0.00
Total					75	46	16	13	156	70	+86	61.33

Source: Competitions

=== Supercopa do Brasil ===
Goals and red cards are shown.

11 April 2021 Final	Flamengo	2–2 (6–5 p)	Palmeiras	Brasília
11:00 UTC−3	Gabriel 23' de Arrascaeta 45+4'	Report	Veiga 2', 74' (pen.)	Stadium: Nacional Mané Garrincha; Attendance: 0 (Note: The match was played behind closed doors due to the COVID-19 pandemic in Brazil.); Referee: Leandro Pedro Vuaden
	Penalties
	de Arrascaeta (penalty scored); Filipe Luís (penalty missed); Matheuzinho (penalty missed); Vitinho (penalty scored); Gabriel (penalty scored); Gomes (penalty scored); Pepê (penalty missed); Michael (penalty scored); Rodrigo Caio (penalty scored)		(penalty scored) Veiga; (penalty scored) Gómez; (penalty scored) Scarpa; (penalty missed) Luan; (penalty missed) Danilo; (penalty scored) Viña; (penalty missed) Menino; (penalty scored) Veron; (penalty missed) Mayke

=== Campeonato Carioca ===
==== Taça Guanabara ====
Pos	Team	Pld	W	D	L	GF	GA	GD	Pts	Qualification
1	Flamengo (Q)	11	7	2	2	23	10	+13	23	Taça Guanabara Champion and advance to Campeonato Carioca semifinals
2	Fluminense (Q)	11	7	1	3	20	11	+9	22	Advance to Campeonato Carioca semifinals
3	Portuguesa (Q)	11	6	3	2	20	8	+12	21	Advance to Campeonato Carioca semifinals
4	Volta Redonda (Q)	11	6	3	2	17	12	+5	21	Advance to Campeonato Carioca semifinals
5	Vasco da Gama (Q)	11	4	5	2	21	15	+6	17	Advance to Taça Rio semifinals
6	Nova Iguaçu (Q)	11	4	3	4	16	15	+1	15	Advance to Taça Rio semifinals
7	Botafogo (Q)	11	3	6	2	14	9	+5	15	Advance to Taça Rio semifinals
8	Madureira (Q)	11	3	6	2	13	16	−3	15	Advance to Taça Rio semifinals
9	Resende	11	3	2	6	11	21	−10	11	
10	Boavista	11	2	5	4	14	16	−2	11	
11	Bangu	11	1	3	7	5	18	−13	6	
12	Macaé (R)	11	0	1	10	6	29	−23	1	Relegated

Source: FERJ
Rules for classification: 1) points; 2) wins; 3) goal difference; 4) goals scored; 5) head-to-head results; 6) disciplinary record; 7) random draw.
(Q) Qualified; (R) Relegated

Goals and red cards are shown.

2 March 2021 1	Flamengo	1–0	Nova Iguaçu	Rio de Janeiro
21:30 UTC−3	Max 90+4'	Report		Stadium: Maracanã; Attendance: 0 Referee: Rejane Caetano da Silva

6 March 2021 2	Macaé	0–2	Flamengo	Rio de Janeiro
18:00 UTC−3		Report	Muniz 38', 66'	Stadium: Maracanã; Attendance: 0 Referee: Yuri Elino Ferreira da Cruz

14 March 2021 3	Flamengo	0–1	Fluminense	Rio de Janeiro
18:00 UTC−3		Report	Julião 83'	Stadium: Maracanã; Attendance: 0 Referee: Bruno Arleu de Araújo

19 March 2021 4	Flamengo	4–1	Resende	Rio de Janeiro
21:00 UTC−3	Vitinho 49'; Pedro 57'; Muniz 74', 90+2'	Report	Paulo Victor 64'	Stadium: Maracanã; Attendance: 0 Referee: Felipe da Silva Gonçalves

24 March 2021 5	Botafogo	0–2	Flamengo	Rio de Janeiro
21:35 UTC−3		Report	Muniz 24'; Moura 85'	Stadium: Nilton Santos; Attendance: 0 Referee: Mauricio Machado Coelho Junior

27 March 2021 6	Boavista	1–1	Flamengo	Saquarema
21:05 UTC−3	Jean Victor 23'	Report	Vitinho 29'	Stadium: Elcyr Resende de Mendonça; Attendance: 0 Referee: Paulo Renato Moreira da Silva Coelho

31 March 2021 7	Flamengo	3–0	Bangu	Volta Redonda
21:00 UTC−3	Bruno Henrique 45+5' de Arrascaeta 69'; Gabriel 87'	Report		Stadium: Raulino de Oliveira; Attendance: 0 Referee: Grazianni Maciel Rocha

5 April 2021 8	Madureira	1–5	Flamengo	Volta Redonda
21:00 UTC−3	Luiz Paulo 58'	Report	Gabriel 17' (pen.), 31'; Gerson 25'; Diego 45+2' de Arrascaeta 65'	Stadium: Raulino de Oliveira; Attendance: 0 Referee: Rodrigo Carvalhaes de Miranda

15 April 2021 9	Flamengo	1–3	Vasco da Gama	Rio de Janeiro
19:00 UTC−3	Vitinho 90+5'	Report	Matos 6'; Cano 30'; Morato 81'	Stadium: Maracanã; Attendance: 0 Referee: Bruno Arleu de Araújo

17 April 2021 10	Portuguesa	2–2	Flamengo	Rio de Janeiro
21:05 UTC−3	Silva 13'; Romarinho 28'	Report	Pedro 56', 63'	Stadium: Luso Brasileiro; Attendance: 0 Referee: Rafael Martins de Sá

24 April 2021 11	Flamengo	2–1	Volta Redonda	Rio de Janeiro
19:00 UTC−3	Michael 45+1'; Vitinho 63'	Report	Bruno Barra 45+5'	Stadium: Maracanã; Attendance: 0 Referee: Grazianni Maciel Rocha

==== Semi-finals ====
1 May 2021 First leg	Volta Redonda	0–3	Flamengo	Volta Redonda
21:05 UTC−3		Report	Pedro 50', 53', 90+5'	Stadium: Raulino de Oliveira; Attendance: 0 Referee: Rafael Martins de Sá

8 May 2021 Second leg	Flamengo	4–1 (7–1 agg.)	Volta Redonda	Rio de Janeiro
21:05 UTC−3	Michael 12'; Gabriel 21', 43'; Vitinho 49'	Report	João Carlos 90' (pen.)	Stadium: Maracanã; Attendance: 0 Referee: Felipe da Silva Gonçalves Paludo

==== Finals ====
15 May 2021 First leg	Fluminense	1–1	Flamengo	Rio de Janeiro
21:05 UTC−3	Hernández 77'	Report	Gabriel 18' (pen.)	Stadium: Maracanã; Attendance: 0 Referee: Alexandre Vargas Tavares de Jesus

22 May 2021 Second leg	Flamengo	3–1 (4–2 agg.)	Fluminense	Rio de Janeiro
21:05 UTC−3	Gabriel 45' (pen.), 45+2'; Gomes 87'	Report	Fred 52' (pen.)	Stadium: Maracanã; Attendance: 0 Referee: Bruno Arleu de Araújo

=== Copa Libertadores ===
==== Group stage ====
Pos	Team	Pld	W	D	L	GF	GA	GD	Pts	Qualification	FLA	VEL	LDQ	ULC
1	(Brazil) Flamengo	6	3	3	0	14	9	+5	12	Round of 16	—	0–0	2–2	4–1
2	(Argentina) Vélez Sarsfield	6	3	1	2	10	8	+2	10	Round of 16	2–3	—	3–1	2–1
3	(Ecuador) LDU Quito	6	2	2	2	15	13	+2	8	Copa Sudamericana	2–3	3–1	—	5–2
4	(Chile) Unión La Calera	6	0	2	4	8	17	−9	2		2–2	0–2	2–2	—

Source: CONMEBOL
Rules for classification: 1) Points; 2) Goal difference; 3) Goals scored; 4) Away goals scored; 5) CONMEBOL ranking.

Goals and red cards are shown.

20 April 2021 1	Vélez Sarsfield (Argentina)	2–3	(Brazil) Flamengo	Buenos Aires, Argentina
21:30 UTC−3	Janson 21', 54'; Mancuello (red card) 86'	Report	Arão 43'; Gabriel 62' (pen.) de Arrascaeta 80'	Stadium: José Amalfitani; Attendance: 0 (Note: The match was played behind closed doors due to the COVID-19 pandemic in South America.); Referee: Wilmar Roldán (Colombia)

27 April 2021 2	Flamengo (Brazil)	4–1	(Chile) Unión La Calera	Rio de Janeiro, Brazil
19:15 UTC−3	Gabriel 31', 79' de Arrascaeta 34'; Pedro 85'	Report	Sáez 57'	Stadium: Maracanã; Attendance: 0 Referee: José Argote (Venezuela) (Note: Referee Eber Aquino from Paraguay, who was originally assigned to the Flamengo v Unión La Calera match was replaced by José Argote from Venezuela.)

4 May 2021 3	LDU Quito (Ecuador)	2–3	(Brazil) Flamengo	Quito, Ecuador
21:30 UTC−3	Martínez Borja 50'; Amarilla 61'	Report	Gabriel 3', 85' (pen.); Bruno Henrique 30'	Stadium: La Casa Blanca; Attendance: 0 Referee: Esteban Ostojich (Uruguay)

11 May 2021 4	Unión La Calera (Chile)	2–2	(Brazil) Flamengo	La Calera, Chile
21:30 UTC−3	Martínez 8'; Arão 27' (o.g.)	Report	Gabriel 31' (pen.); Arão 77'	Stadium: Municipal Nicolás Chahuán Nazar; Attendance: 0 Referee: Andrés Rojas (Colombia)

19 May 2021 5	Flamengo (Brazil)	2–2	(Ecuador) LDU Quito	Rio de Janeiro, Brazil
21:00 UTC−3	Arão (red card) 15'; Pedro 32'; Gustavo Henrique 88'	Report	Guerra 35'; Julio 60'	Stadium: Maracanã; Attendance: 0 Referee: Alexis Herrera (Venezuela)

27 May 2021 6	Flamengo (Brazil)	0–0	(Argentina) Vélez Sarsfield	Rio de Janeiro, Brazil
21:00 UTC−3		Report	Ortega (yellow card) 57' (yellow-red card) 90+5'	Stadium: Maracanã; Attendance: 0 Referee: Leodán Gonzalez (Uruguay)

==== Round of 16 ====
The draw for the round of 16 was held on 1 June 2021.

14 July 2021 1st leg	Defensa y Justicia (Argentina)	0–1	(Brazil) Flamengo	Florencio Varela, Argentina
21:30 UTC−3		Report	Michael 21'	Stadium: Norberto Tomaghello; Attendance: 0 Referee: Éber Aquino (Paraguay)

21 July 2021 2nd leg	Flamengo (Brazil)	4–1 (5–1 agg.)	(Argentina) Defensa y Justicia	Brasília, Brazil
21:30 UTC−3	Rodrigo Caio 9' de Arrascaeta 66'; Vitinho 83', 90+4'	Report	Loaiza 41'	Stadium: Nacional Mané Garrincha; Attendance: 5,518; Referee: Roberto Tobar (Chile)

==== Quarter-finals ====
11 August 2021 1st leg	Olimpia (Paraguay)	1–4	(Brazil) Flamengo	Asunción, Paraguay
19:15 UTC−3	Torres 45+14'	Report	de Arrascaeta 16'; Gabriel 45+12' (pen.), 52'; Vitinho 90+1'	Stadium: Manuel Ferreira; Attendance: 1,200; Referee: Fernando Rapallini (Argentina)

18 August 2021 2nd leg	Flamengo (Brazil)	5–1 (9–2 agg.)	(Paraguay) Olimpia	Brasília, Brazil
19:15 UTC−3	Gabriel 30', 78'; Bruno Henrique 36'; Arão 49'; Salcedo 56' (o.g.)	Report	Recalde 45'	Stadium: Nacional Mané Garrincha; Attendance: 11,211; Referee: Jesús Valenzuela (Venezuela)

==== Semi-finals ====
22 September 2021 1st leg	Flamengo (Brazil)	2–0	(Ecuador) Barcelona	Rio de Janeiro, Brazil
21:30 UTC−3	Bruno Henrique 21', 38'; L. Pereira (red card) 89'	Report	Molina (yellow card) 23' (yellow-red card) 45+2'	Stadium: Maracanã; Attendance: 23,083; Referee: Andrés Cunha (Uruguay)

29 September 2021 2nd leg	Barcelona (Ecuador)	0–2 (0–4 agg.)	(Brazil) Flamengo	Guayaquil, Ecuador
21:30 UTC−3		Report	Bruno Henrique 18', 50'	Stadium: Monumental Banco Pichincha; Referee: Roberto Tobar (Chile)

==== Final ====
Goals and red cards are shown.

27 November 2021 Final	Palmeiras (Brazil)	2–1 (a.e.t.)	(Brazil) Flamengo	Montevideo, Uruguay
17:00 UTC−3	Veiga 5'; Deyverson 95'	Report	Gabriel 72'	Stadium: Centenario; Attendance: 55,023; Referee: Néstor Pitana (Argentina)

=== Campeonato Brasileiro ===
On 24 March 2021 the Brazilian Football Confederation announced the 2021 Campeonato Brasileiro Série A schedule with Flamengo opening the league against Palmeiras at Maracanã Stadium.

==== League table ====
Pos	Team	Pld	W	D	L	GF	GA	GD	Pts	Qualification or relegation
1	Atlético Mineiro (C)	38	26	6	6	67	34	+33	84	Qualification for Copa Libertadores group stage (Note: Palmeiras qualified for the Copa Libertadores group stage by winning the 2021 Copa Libertadores.)
2	Flamengo	38	21	8	9	69	36	+33	71	Qualification for Copa Libertadores group stage
3	Palmeiras	38	20	6	12	58	43	+15	66	Qualification for Copa Libertadores group stage
4	Fortaleza	38	17	7	14	44	45	−1	58	Qualification for Copa Libertadores group stage
5	Corinthians	38	15	12	11	40	36	+4	57	Qualification for Copa Libertadores group stage

Source: CBF
Rules for classification: 1) points; 2) wins; 3) goal difference; 4) goals scored; 5) head-to-head results (only between two teams); 6) fewest red cards; 7) fewest yellow cards; 8) drawing of lots.
(C) Champions

==== Results by round ====
Round	1	2	3	4	5	6	7	8	9	10	11	12	13	14	15	16	17	18	19	20	21	22	23	24	25	26	27	28	29	30	31	32	33	34	35	36	37	38
Ground	H	A	H	A	H	H	A	A	H	A	H	A	H	A	H	H	A	A	H	A	H	A	H	A	A	H	H	A	H	A	H	A	H	A	A	H	H	A
Result	W	D	W	D	L	W	L	W	L	L	W	W	W	W	L	W	D	W	W	W	L	D	W	D	W	W	D	L	W	D	W	W	W	W	D	W	L	L
Position	6	2	3	3	10	8	10	6	9	12	8	6	6	5	5	5	5	5	2	3	3	4	3	2	2	2	2	4	3	3	3	2	2	2	2	2	2	2

Source: Matches
A = Away; H = Home; W = Win; D = Draw; L = Loss; P = Postponed

==== Matches ====
Goals and red cards are shown.

30 May 2021 1	Flamengo	1–0	Palmeiras	Rio de Janeiro
16:00 UTC−3	Pedro 75'	Report		Stadium: Maracanã; Attendance: 0 (Note: The match was played behind closed doors due to the COVID-19 pandemic in Brazil.); Referee: Anderson Daronco

13 June 2021 3	Flamengo	2–0	América Mineiro	Rio de Janeiro
16:00 UTC−3	Bruno Henrique 24'; Muniz 67'	Report		Stadium: Maracanã; Attendance: 0 Referee: Ramon Abatti

19 June 2021 5	Flamengo	2–3	Red Bull Bragantino	Rio de Janeiro
21:00 UTC−3	Muniz 27', 64'	Report	Aderlan 12'; Ramires 69'; Chrigor 90+8'	Stadium: Maracanã; Attendance: 0 Referee: Bráulio da Silva Machado

23 June 2021 6	Flamengo	2–1	Fortaleza	Rio de Janeiro
19:00 UTC−3	Bruno Henrique 21', 43'	Report	David 46'	Stadium: Maracanã; Attendance: 0 Referee: Anderson Daronco

27 June 2021 7	Juventude	1–0	Flamengo	Caxias do Sul
11:00 UTC−3	Peixoto 25'	Report		Stadium: Alfredo Jaconi; Attendance: 0 Referee: Thiago Luis Scarascati

1 July 2021 8	Cuiabá	0–2	Flamengo	Cuiabá
20:00 UTC−3		Report	Pedro 10'; Maia 90+2'	Stadium: Arena Pantanal; Attendance: 0 Referee: Rodolpho Toski Marques

4 July 2021 9	Flamengo	0–1	Fluminense	São Paulo
16:00 UTC−3		Report	André 90+1'	Stadium: Neo Química Arena; Attendance: 0 Referee: Luiz Flávio de Oliveira

7 July 2021 10	Atlético Mineiro	2–1	Flamengo	Belo Horizonte
19:00 UTC−3	Savarino 51', 53'	Report	Arão 88'	Stadium: Mineirão; Attendance: 0 Referee: Paulo Roberto Alves Júnior

11 July 2021 11	Flamengo	2–1	Chapecoense	Rio de Janeiro
18:15 UTC−3	de Arrascaeta 78'; Michael 82'	Report	Perotti 67'	Stadium: Maracanã; Attendance: 0 Referee: Paulo Cesar Zanovelli

18 July 2021 12	Bahia	0–5	Flamengo	Salvador
18:15 UTC−3		Report	Gabriel 23' (pen.), 41', 62'; Pedro 74'; Vitinho 84'	Stadium: Pituaçu; Attendance: 0 Referee: Wilton Pereira Sampaio

25 July 2021 13	Flamengo	5–1	São Paulo	Rio de Janeiro
16:00 UTC−3	Bruno Henrique 70', 72', 77'; Gustavo Henrique 86'; Welington 90+2' (o.g.)	Report	Arboleda 48'	Stadium: Maracanã; Attendance: 0 Referee: Felipe Fernandes de Lima

1 August 2021 14	Corinthians	1–3	Flamengo	São Paulo
16:00 UTC−3	Vitinho 88'	Report	Ribeiro 7'; Gustavo Henrique 40'; Bruno Henrique 44'	Stadium: Neo Química Arena; Attendance: 0 Referee: Leandro Pedro Vuaden

8 August 2021 15	Flamengo	0–4	Internacional	Rio de Janeiro
18:15 UTC−3	Gabriel (yellow card) 61' (yellow-red card) 63'	Report	Yuri Alberto 19', 41', 70'; Taison 55'	Stadium: Maracanã; Attendance: 0 Referee: Paulo Roberto Alves Júnior

15 August 2021 16	Flamengo	2–0	Sport	Volta Redonda
16:00 UTC−3	Bruno Henrique 11'; Ronaldo Henrique 47' (o.g.)	Report		Stadium: Raulino de Oliveira; Attendance: 0 Referee: Raphael Claus

22 August 2021 17	Ceará	1–1	Flamengo	Fortaleza
16:00 UTC−3	Vina 32'	Report	Vitinho 52'	Stadium: Castelão; Attendance: 0 Referee: Leandro Pedro Vuaden

28 August 2021 18	Santos	0–4	Flamengo	Santos
19:00 UTC−3		Report	Gabriel 52' (pen.), 71', 80'; A. Pereira 84'	Stadium: Vila Belmiro; Attendance: 0 Referee: Braulio da Silva Machado

12 September 2021 20	Palmeiras	1–3	Flamengo	São Paulo
16:00 UTC−3	Wesley 15'; Zé Rafael (red card) 90+6'	Report	Michael 17', 81'; Pedro 57'	Stadium: Allianz Parque; Attendance: 0 Referee: Wilton Pereira Sampaio

19 September 2021 21	Flamengo	0–1	Grêmio	Rio de Janeiro
20:30 UTC−3		Report	Borja 45+3'	Stadium: Maracanã; Attendance: 0 Referee: Marielson Alves Silva

26 September 2021 22	América Mineiro	1–1	Flamengo	Belo Horizonte
11:00 UTC−3	Alê 90+5'	Report	Michael 89'	Stadium: Independência; Attendance: 0 Referee: Anderson Daronco

3 October 2021 23	Flamengo	3–0	Athletico Paranaense	Rio de Janeiro
16:00 UTC−3	Ribeiro 5'; Bruno Henrique 10'; A. Pereira 45+4'	Report		Stadium: Maracanã; Attendance: 8,408; Referee: Savio Pereira

6 October 2021 24	Red Bull Bragantino	1–1	Flamengo	Bragança Paulista
20:30 UTC−3	Artur 59'	Report	Pedro 39'	Stadium: Nabi Abi Chedid; Attendance: N/A; Referee: Ramon Abatti

9 October 2021 25	Fortaleza	0–3	Flamengo	Fortaleza
19:00 UTC−3	Ronald (red card) 68'	Report	Pedro 60'; Michael 64', 67'	Stadium: Castelão; Attendance: N/A; Referee: Felipe Fernandes de Lima

13 October 2021 26	Flamengo	3–1	Juventude	Rio de Janeiro
19:00 UTC−3	Kenedy 12'; Pedro 26'; A. Pereira 35'	Report	William Matheus 57'	Stadium: Maracanã; Attendance: 8,482; Referee: André Luís Castro

17 October 2021 27	Flamengo	0–0	Cuiabá	Rio de Janeiro
20:30 UTC−3		Report		Stadium: Maracanã; Attendance: 8,209; Referee: Flávio Rodrigues de Souza

23 October 2021 28	Fluminense	3–1	Flamengo	Rio de Janeiro
19:00 UTC−3	John Kennedy 17', 61'; Hernández 85'	Report	Renê 71'	Stadium: Maracanã; Attendance: 10,029; Referee: Vinícius Gonçalves Dias Araújo

30 October 2021 29	Flamengo	1–0	Atlético Mineiro	Rio de Janeiro
19:00 UTC−3	Michael 25'	Report		Stadium: Maracanã; Attendance: 24,696; Referee: Anderson Daronco

2 November 2021 4	Athletico Paranaense	2–2	Flamengo	Curitiba
16:00 UTC−3	Kayzer 63'; Bissoli 90+5'	Report	Gabriel 17', 29'	Stadium: Arena da Baixada; Attendance: N/A; Referee: Marielson Alves Silva

5 November 2021 19	Flamengo	2–0	Atlético Goianiense	Rio de Janeiro
21:30 UTC−3	Michael 44', 74'	Report		Stadium: Maracanã; Attendance: 18,527; Referee: Rodolpho Toski Marques

8 November 2021 30	Chapecoense	2–2	Flamengo	Chapecó
20:00 UTC−3	Nunes 31', 35', (yellow card) 51' (yellow-red card) 59'	Report	Matheuzinho 26'; Michael 41'; Ribeiro (red card) 89'	Stadium: Arena Condá; Attendance: N/A; Referee: Denis Ribeiro Serafim

11 November 2021 31	Flamengo	3–0	Bahia	Rio de Janeiro
19:00 UTC−3	Gabriel 32' (pen.); Michael 58'; Diego (red card) 63'; A. Pereira 89'	Report	Bahia (yellow card) 19' (yellow-red card) 42'; Rossi (red card) 63'	Stadium: Maracanã; Attendance: 9,488; Referee: André Castro

14 November 2021 32	São Paulo	0–4	Flamengo	São Paulo
16:00 UTC−3	Calleri (red card) 10'	Report	Gabriel 1'; Bruno Henrique 4'; Michael 42', 55'	Stadium: Morumbi; Attendance: 47,855; Referee: Leandro Vuaden

17 November 2021 33	Flamengo	1–0	Corinthians	Rio de Janeiro
16:00 UTC−3	Bruno Henrique 90+4'	Report		Stadium: Maracanã; Attendance: 48,981; Referee: Anderson Daronco

20 November 2021 34	Internacional	1–2	Flamengo	Porto Alegre
21:30 UTC−3	Taison 41'	Report	Gabriel 4'; A.Pereira 11'	Stadium: Beira-Rio; Attendance: N/A; Referee: Sávio Pereira Sampaio

23 November 2021 2	Grêmio	2–2	Flamengo	Porto Alegre
21:00 UTC−3	Jhonata Robert (yellow card) 51' (yellow-red card) 60'; Borja 75'; Brenno (red card) 78'; Ferreira 82'	Report	Vitinho 58', 74'	Stadium: Arena do Grêmio; Attendance: 0 Referee: Bráulio da Silva Machado

30 November 2021 36	Flamengo	2–1	Ceará	Rio de Janeiro
20:00 UTC−3	Gabriel 3'; Matheuzinho 79'	Report	Rick 71'	Stadium: Maracanã; Attendance: 47,862; Referee: Caio Max Augusto Vieira

3 December 2021 35	Sport	1–1	Flamengo	São Lourenço da Mata
20:00 UTC−3	Gustavo 51'	Report	Michael 40'	Stadium: Arena Pernambuco; Attendance: N/A; Referee: Leandro Pedro Vuaden

6 December 2021 37	Flamengo	0–1	Santos	Rio de Janeiro
20:00 UTC−3	Gabriel (penalty missed) 68'	Report	Marcos Leonardo 57'	Stadium: Maracanã; Attendance: 41,930; Referee: Anderson Daronco

9 December 2021 38	Atlético Goianiense	2–0	Flamengo	Goiânia
21:30 UTC−3	Lucão 82'; Jonas Toró 90+2'	Report		Stadium: Antônio Accioly; Attendance: 10,746; Referee: Paulo Roberto Alves Júnior

=== Copa do Brasil ===
As Flamengo will participate in the 2021 Copa Libertadores, the club will enter the Copa do Brasil in the third round.

==== Third round ====
Goals and red cards are shown.

10 June 2021 1st leg	Coritiba	0–1	Flamengo	Curitiba
19:00 UTC−3	Ribeiro (yellow card) 58' (yellow-red card) 90+2'	Report	Muniz 16'	Stadium: Couto Pereira; Attendance: 0 Referee: Sávio Pereira

16 June 2021 2nd leg	Flamengo	2–0 (3–0 agg.)	Coritiba	Rio de Janeiro
21:30 UTC−3	Vitinho 27'; Bruno Henrique 66'	Report		Stadium: Maracanã; Attendance: 0 Referee: Caio Max Augusto Vieira

==== Round of 16 ====
Goals and red cards are shown.

29 July 2021 1st leg	Flamengo	6–0	ABC	Rio de Janeiro
20:00 UTC−3	de Arrascaeta 28'; Gabriel 33', 45+1'; Bruno Henrique 42'; Donato 75' (o.g.); Michael 84'	Report		Stadium: Maracanã; Attendance: 0 Referee: Marielson Alves Silva

5 August 2021 2nd leg	ABC	0–1 (0–7 agg.)	Flamengo	Natal
21:30 UTC−3		Report	Gomes 85'	Stadium: Arena das Dunas; Attendance: 0 Referee: Ramon Abatti

==== Quarter-finals ====
Goals and red cards are shown.

25 August 2021 1st leg	Grêmio	0–4	Flamengo	Porto Alegre
21:30 UTC−3	Vanderson (red card) 90+3'	Report	Viana 53'; Michael 85'; Rodinei 90+1'; Vitinho 90+7' (pen.); Isla (yellow card) 33' (yellow-red card) 45'	Stadium: Arena do Grêmio; Attendance: 0 Referee: Vinicius Gonçalves Dias Araújo

15 September 2021 2nd leg	Flamengo	2–0 (6–0 agg.)	Grêmio	Rio de Janeiro
21:30 UTC−3	Pedro 79' (pen.), 87'	Report		Stadium: Maracanã; Attendance: 6,446; Referee: Rodolpho Toski Marques

==== Semi-finals ====
Goals and red cards are shown.

20 October 2021 1st leg	Athletico Paranaense	2–2	Flamengo	Curitiba
21:30 UTC−3	Pedro Henrique 48'; Kayzer 71'	Report	Maia 15'; Pedro 90+10' (pen.)	Stadium: Arena da Baixada; Attendance: 0 Referee: Luiz Flávio de Oliveira

27 October 2021 2nd leg	Flamengo	0–3 (2–5 agg.)	Athletico Paranaense	Rio de Janeiro
21:30 UTC−3		Report	Nikão 10' (pen.), 45+8'; Khellven (red card) 79'; Zé Ivaldo 89'	Stadium: Maracanã; Attendance: 31,586; Referee: Wilton Pereira Sampaio

== Management team ==
As of 22 December 2021.

Position	Name
Coaching staff
Manager	Vacant
Assistant manager	(Brazil) Maurício de Souza
Goalkeepers trainer	(Brazil) Wagner Miranda
Goalkeepers trainer	(Brazil) Thiago Eller
Medical staff
Fitness coach	(Brazil) Alexandre Sanz
Fitness coach	(Brazil) Roberto Oliveira
Fitness coach	(Brazil) Rafael Winicki
Fitness coach	(Brazil) Danilo Augusto
Fitness coach	(Brazil) Roberto Oliveira Junior
Team doctor	(Brazil) Marcio Tannure
Physiotherapist	(Brazil) Mario Peixoto
Physiotherapist	(Brazil) Marcio Puglia

== Roster ==
As of 22 September 2021

No.	Pos.	Name	Date of birth (age)	Signed in	Contract end	Signed from	Transfer fee	Notes
Goalkeepers
1	GK	(Brazil) Diego Alves	24 June 1985 (aged 36)	2017	2021	(Spain) Valencia	€300k	2nd Vice Captain
22	GK	(Brazil) Gabriel Batista	3 June 1998 (aged 23)	2017	2022	Youth system		
37	GK	(Brazil) César	27 January 1992 (aged 29)	2013	2022	Youth system		
45	GK	(Brazil) Hugo Souza	31 January 1999 (aged 22)	2018	2023	Youth system		
Defenders
2	CB	(Brazil) Gustavo Henrique	24 March 1993 (aged 28)	2020	2024	(Brazil) Santos	Free	
3	CB	(Brazil) Rodrigo Caio	17 August 1993 (aged 28)	2019	2023	(Brazil) São Paulo	€5m	
4	CB	(Brazil) Léo Pereira	31 January 1996 (aged 25)	2020	2024	(Brazil) Athletico Paranaense	€6.1m	
6	LB	(Brazil) Renê	14 September 1992 (aged 29)	2017	2022	(Brazil) Sport Recife	€955k	
16	LB	(Brazil) Filipe Luís	9 August 1985 (aged 36)	2019	2021	(Spain) Atlético Madrid	Free	
20	RB	(Brazil) Rodinei	29 January 1992 (aged 29)	2016	2022	(Brazil) SEV Hortolândia	€941k	
23	CB	(Brazil) David Luiz	22 April 1987 (aged 34)	2021	2023	(England) Arsenal	Free	
30	CB	(Brazil) Bruno Viana	5 February 1995 (aged 26)	2021	2021	(Portugal) Braga	Free	On loan from Braga
34	RB	(Brazil) Matheuzinho	8 September 2000 (aged 21)	2020	2025	(Brazil) Londrina	€180k	
36	LB	(Brazil) Ramon	13 March 2001 (aged 20)	2020	2025	Youth system		
44	RB	(Chile) Mauricio Isla	12 June 1988 (aged 33)	2020	2022	(Turkey) Fenerbahçe	Free	
Midfielders
5	CM	(Brazil) Willian Arão	3 December 1992 (aged 29)	2016	2023	(Brazil) Botafogo	Free	
7	AM	(Brazil) Éverton Ribeiro	10 April 1989 (aged 32)	2017	2023	(United Arab Emirates) Al-Ahli	€6m	Vice Captain
8	DM	(Brazil) Thiago Maia	23 March 1997 (aged 24)	2020	2022	(France) Lille	Free	On loan from Lille
10	AM	(Brazil) Diego	28 February 1985 (aged 36)	2016	2021	(Turkey) Fenerbahçe	Free	Captain
14	AM	(Uruguay) Giorgian de Arrascaeta	1 June 1994 (aged 27)	2019	2023	(Brazil) Cruzeiro	€15m	
18	CM	(Brazil) Andreas Pereira	1 January 1996 (aged 25)	2021	2022	(England) Manchester United	Free	On loan from Manchester United
26	DM	(Paraguay) Robert Piris Da Motta	26 July 1994 (aged 27)	2018	2022	(Argentina) San Lorenzo	€3m	
35	DM	(Brazil) João Gomes	12 February 2001 (aged 20)	2020	2025	Youth system		
Forwards
9	CF	(Brazil) Gabriel Barbosa	30 August 1996 (aged 25)	2020	2024	(Italy) Inter Milan	€17m	
11	LW	(Brazil) Vitinho	9 October 1993 (aged 28)	2018	2022	(Russia) CSKA Moscow	€10m	
13	CF	(Brazil) Lázaro	12 March 2002 (aged 19)	2020	2025	Youth system		
19	CF	(Brazil) Michael	12 March 1996 (aged 25)	2020	2024	(Brazil) Goiás	€7.5m	
21	CF	(Brazil) Pedro	20 June 1997 (aged 24)	2021	2023	(Italy) Fiorentina	€14m	
27	LW	(Brazil) Bruno Henrique	30 December 1990 (aged 30)	2019	2023	(Brazil) Santos	€5.36m	
33	LW	(Brazil) Kenedy	8 February 1996 (aged 25)	2021	2022	(England) Chelsea	€485k	On loan from Chelsea
63	CF	(Brazil) Vitor Gabriel	20 January 2000 (aged 21)	2018	2023	Youth system		

== Transfers and loans ==
=== Transfers in ===
Position	Player	Transferred from	Fee	Date	Team	Source
DF	(Brazil) Kléber	(Japan) Tokyo Verdy	Loan return	30 January 2021	First Team	
MF	(Brazil) Hugo Moura	(Brazil) Coritiba	Loan return	1 March 2021	First Team	
MF	(Paraguay) Robert Piris Da Motta	(Turkey) Gençlerbirliği	Loan return	25 May 2021	First Team	
GK	(Brazil) Yago Darub	(Brazil) Cianorte	Loan return	26 May 2021	First Team	
DF	(Brazil) Rodinei	(Brazil) Internacional	Loan return	1 June 2021	First Team	
DF	(Brazil) Kléber	(Brazil) Cruzeiro	Loan return	27 July 2021	First Team	
DF	(Brazil) David Luiz	(England) Arsenal	Free	10 September 2021	First Team	

=== Loan in ===
Position	Player	Loaned from	Fee	Start	End	Team	Source
DF	(Brazil) Bruno Viana	(Portugal) Braga	Free	12 February 2021	31 December 2021	First Team	
FW	(Brazil) Kenedy	(England) Chelsea	R$3m / €485k	18 August 2021	30 June 2022	First Team	
MF	(Brazil) Andreas Pereira	(England) Manchester United	Free	20 August 2021	30 June 2022	First Team	
FW	(Colombia) Camilo Durán	(Colombia) Independiente Medellín	Free	5 August 2021	31 December 2022	Academy	
Total			R$3m / €485k				

=== Transfers out ===
Position	Player	Transferred to	Fee	Date	Team	Source
FW	(Brazil) Guilherme	(Brazil) Madureira	Loan return	4 February 2021	First Team	
AM	(Brazil) Pepê	(Brazil) Cuiabá	Free transfer	22 April 2021	First Team	
CM	(Brazil) Gerson	(France) Olympique de Marseille	R$192m / €25m	1 July 2021	First Team	
DM	(Brazil) Ronaldo	(Japan) Shimizu S-Pulse	End of contract	1 July 2021	First Team	
DF	(Brazil) Kleber	(Ecuador) Guayaquil City	Free transfer	27 July 2021	First Team	
FW	(Brazil) Rodrigo Muniz	(England) Fulham	R$49.5m / €8m	13 August 2021	First Team	
Total			R$241.5m / €33m			

=== Loan out ===
Position	Player	Loaned to	Fee	Start	End	Team	Source
GK	(Brazil) Yago Darub	(Brazil) Cianorte	Free	16 January 2021	25 May 2021	First Team	
DF	(Brazil) Natan	(Brazil) Red Bull Bragantino	R$5m / €760k	15 March 2021	31 December 2021	First Team	
DF	(Brazil) João Lucas	(Brazil) Cuiabá	Free	4 May 2021	31 December 2021	First Team	
DF	(Brazil) Kleber	(Brazil) Cruzeiro	Free	21 May 2021	31 December 2021	First Team	
MF	(Colombia) Richard Ríos	(Mexico) Mazatlán	Free	21 June 2021	30 June 2022	First Team	
DF	(Brazil) Matheus Thuler	(France) Montpellier	R$1.25m / €200k	1 July 2021	30 June 2022	First Team	
FW	(Brazil) Filipe Chrysman	(Brazil) Guarani	Free	24 July 2021	31 December 2021	Academy	
MF	(Brazil) Hugo Moura	(Switzerland) Lugano	Free	27 July 2021	30 June 2022	First Team	
MF	(Brazil) Max	(Brazil) Cuiabá	Free	17 September 2021	31 December 2021	First Team	
Total			R$6.25m / €960k				

== Statistics ==
Last updated: 10 December 2021.

Players in italics have left the club before the end of the season.

=== Appearances ===
No.	Pos.	Name	Série A		Copa do Brasil		Libertadores		Carioca		Other (Note: Includes Supercopa do Brasil.)		Total		
No.	Pos.	Name	Starts	Subs	Starts	Subs	Starts	Subs	Starts	Subs	Starts	Subs	Starts	Subs	Apps
Goalkeepers
1	GK	(Brazil) Diego Alves	26	0	6	0	11	0	5	0	1	0	49	0	49
22	GK	(Brazil) Gabriel Batista	5	0	2	0	2	0	6	0	—	—	15	0	15
37	GK	(Brazil) César	—	—	—	—	—	—	—	—	—	—	0	0	0
45	GK	(Brazil) Hugo Souza	7	1	—	—	0	1	4	0	—	—	11	2	13
51	GK	(Brazil) Matheus Cunha	0	0	—	—	—	—	0	0	—	—	0	0	0
Defenders
2	CB	(Brazil) Gustavo Henrique	17	4	2	1	6	2	5	0	—	—	30	7	37
3	CB	(Brazil) Rodrigo Caio	19	0	4	0	5	0	4	0	1	0	33	0	33
4	CB	(Brazil) Léo Pereira	19	0	5	0	4	3	4	0	—	—	32	3	35
6	LB	(Brazil) Renê	8	11	3	0	1	3	6	0	—	—	18	14	32
16	LB	(Brazil) Filipe Luís	21	1	4	0	11	0	5	0	1	0	41	1	42
20	RB	(Brazil) Rodinei	3	15	1	3	1	0	—	—	—	—	5	18	23
23	CB	(Brazil) David Luiz	7	0	—	—	3	0	—	—	—	—	10	0	10
30	CB	(Brazil) Bruno Viana	8	10	3	0	5	3	5	4	—	—	21	17	38
34	RB	(Brazil) Matheuzinho	12	7	4	1	1	6	10	3	0	1	28	17	45
36	LB	(Brazil) Ramon	4	1	1	2	0	4	4	1	—	—	9	8	17
41	CB	(Brazil) Gabriel Noga	1	0	0	1	0	0	3	0	—	—	4	1	5
43	CB	(Brazil) Otávio	0	0	0	0	—	—	—	—	—	—	0	0	0
44	RB	(Chile) Mauricio Isla	15	0	4	0	11	0	5	0	1	0	36	0	36
46	RB	(Brazil) Wesley França	1	0	—	—	—	—	—	—	—	—	1	0	1
49	CB	(Brazil) Cleiton	0	0	—	—	—	—	—	—	—	—	0	0	0
Midfielders
5	CM	(Brazil) Willian Arão	29	1	6	0	11	0	7	0	1	0	54	1	55
7	AM	(Brazil) Éverton Ribeiro	22	0	6	0	13	0	6	2	1	0	48	2	50
8	DM	(Brazil) Thiago Maia	12	11	3	2	1	2	—	—	—	—	16	15	31
10	AM	(Brazil) Diego	19	0	5	1	8	1	5	2	1	0	38	4	42
14	AM	(Uruguay) Giorgian de Arrascaeta	11	3	2	0	11	1	4	2	1	0	29	6	35
15	AM	(Brazil) Yuri de Oliveira	0	0	0	1	—	—	1	0	—	—	1	1	2
18	CM	(Brazil) Andreas Pereira	16	2	3	0	3	0	—	—	—	—	22	2	24
26	DM	(Paraguay) Robert Piris Da Motta	1	4	—	—	0	1	—	—	—	—	1	5	6
35	CM	(Brazil) João Gomes	11	8	2	2	3	3	9	5	0	1	25	19	44
39	AM	(Brazil) Daniel Cabral	—	—	0	1	—	—	1	1	—	—	1	2	3
	CM	(Brazil) Lucas André	—	—	—	—	—	—	0	1	—	—	0	1	1
Forwards
9	CF	(Brazil) Gabriel Barbosa	18	0	5	0	13	0	8	0	1	0	45	0	45
11	LW	(Brazil) Vitinho	18	13	4	4	2	9	7	5	0	1	31	32	63
13	CF	(Brazil) Lázaro	1	6	0	2	0	0	1	3	—	—	2	11	13
19	CF	(Brazil) Michael	23	12	4	4	1	7	9	1	0	1	37	25	62
21	CF	(Brazil) Pedro	15	9	1	3	2	8	7	1	—	—	25	21	46
27	LW	(Brazil) Bruno Henrique	21	3	5	0	10	1	5	2	1	0	42	6	48
32	FW	(Brazil) Thiago Fernandes	0	2	0	0	—	—	3	2	—	—	3	4	7
33	LW	(Brazil) Kenedy	4	10	0	2	0	1	—	—	—	—	4	13	17
40	FW	(Brazil) Mateusão	0	2	—	—	0	0	—	—	—	—	0	2	2
42	FW	(Brazil) Matheus França	1	0	0	0	—	—	—	—	—	—	1	0	1
47	FW	(Brazil) Werton	0	2	—	—	—	—	0	0	—	—	0	2	2
48	FW	(Brazil) Ryan Luka	0	2	0	1	—	—	—	—	—	—	0	3	3
57	FW	(Brazil) André Luiz	1	0	0	0	—	—	—	—	—	—	1	0	1
60	FW	(Brazil) Gabriel Barros	—	—	—	—	—	—	0	4	—	—	0	4	4
63	FW	(Brazil) Vitor Gabriel	4	3	0	1	0	0	—	—	—	—	4	4	8
Players transferred out during the season
8	CM	(Brazil) Gerson	4	0	1	0	4	0	6	0	1	0	16	0	16
13	RB	(Brazil) João Lucas	—	—	—	—	—	—	0	2	—	—	0	2	2
17	DM	(Brazil) Hugo Moura	0	5	0	2	0	3	8	2	—	—	8	12	20
31	CB	(Brazil) Natan	—	—	—	—	—	—	3	0	—	—	3	0	3
31	AM	(Brazil) Max	0	6	0	2	—	—	1	5	—	—	1	13	14
40	AM	(Brazil) Pepê	—	—	—	—	—	—	7	0	0	1	7	1	8
43	CF	(Brazil) Rodrigo Muniz	3	6	2	0	0	1	3	10	—	—	8	17	25
54	CM	(Colombia) Richard Ríos	—	—	—	—	—	—	0	4	—	—	0	4	4

=== Goalscorers ===
Rank	Pos.	No.	Player	Série A	Copa do Brasil	Libertadores	Carioca	Other (Note: Includes Supercopa do Brasil.)	Total
1	FW	9	(Brazil) Gabriel Barbosa	12	2	11	8	1	34
2	FW	27	(Brazil) Bruno Henrique	11	2	6	1	0	20
3	FW	19	(Brazil) Michael	14	2	1	2	0	19
4	FW	21	(Brazil) Pedro	7	3	2	6	0	18
5	FW	11	(Brazil) Vitinho	4	2	3	5	0	14
6	FW	43	(Brazil) Rodrigo Muniz	3	1	0	5	0	9
6	MF	14	(Uruguay) Giorgian de Arrascaeta	1	1	4	2	1	9
8	MF	18	(Brazil) Andreas Pereira	5	0	0	0	0	5
9	MF	5	(Brazil) Willian Arão	1	0	3	0	0	4
10	DF	2	(Brazil) Gustavo Henrique	2	0	1	0	0	3
11	MF	7	(Brazil) Éverton Ribeiro	2	0	0	0	0	2
11	MF	8	(Brazil) Thiago Maia	1	1	0	0	0	2
11	DF	33	(Brazil) Matheuzinho	2	0	0	0	0	2
11	MF	35	(Brazil) João Gomes	0	1	0	1	0	2
15	DF	3	(Brazil) Rodrigo Caio	0	0	1	0	0	1
15	DF	6	(Brazil) Renê	1	0	0	0	0	1
15	MF	8	(Brazil) Gerson	0	0	0	1	0	1
15	MF	10	(Brazil) Diego	0	0	0	1	0	1
15	MF	17	(Brazil) Hugo Moura	0	0	0	1	0	1
15	DF	20	(Brazil) Rodinei	0	1	0	0	0	1
15	DF	30	(Brazil) Bruno Viana	0	1	0	0	0	1
15	MF	31	(Brazil) Max	0	0	0	1	0	1
15	FW	33	(Brazil) Kenedy	1	0	0	0	0	1
Own Goals				2	1	1	0	0	4
Total				69	18	33	34	2	156

=== Assists ===
Rank	Pos.	No.	Player	Série A	Copa do Brasil	Libertadores	Carioca	Other (Note: Includes Supercopa do Brasil.)	Total
1	MF	14	(Uruguay) Giorgian de Arrascaeta	6	1	6	–	0	13
2	FW	11	(Brazil) Vitinho	8	3	2	–	0	13
3	FW	27	(Brazil) Bruno Henrique	5	1	4	–	1	11
4	FW	9	(Brazil) Gabriel Barbosa	5	0	5	–	0	10
5	MF	7	(Brazil) Éverton Ribeiro	3	2	3	–	0	8
6	FW	21	(Brazil) Pedro	5	0	0	–	–	5
7	FW	19	(Brazil) Michael	4	0	0	–	0	4
7	DF	20	(Brazil) Rodinei	3	0	1	–	–	4
7	DF	44	(Chile) Mauricio Isla	4	0	0	–	0	4
10	DF	16	(Brazil) Filipe Luís	2	0	0	–	1	3
11	MF	10	(Brazil) Diego	1	0	1	–	0	2
11	DF	34	(Brazil) Matheuzinho	2	0	0	–	0	2
13	DF	2	(Brazil) Gustavo Henrique	0	0	1	–	–	1
13	DF	3	(Brazil) Rodrigo Caio	1	0	0	–	0	1
13	DF	4	(Brazil) Léo Pereira	0	0	1	–	–	1
13	MF	5	(Brazil) Willian Arão	0	1	0	–	0	1
13	DF	6	(Brazil) Renê	1	1	0	–	–	2
13	MF	8	(Brazil) Gerson	0	–	1	–	0	1
13	MF	18	(Brazil) Andreas Pereira	1	0	0	–	–	1
13	FW	33	(Brazil) Kenedy	1	0	0	–	–	1
13	MF	35	(Brazil) João Gomes	1	0	0	–	0	1
13	FW	43	(Brazil) Rodrigo Muniz	1	0	0	–	–	1
13	FW	63	(Brazil) Vitor Gabriel	1	–	0	–	–	1
Total				55	9	25	0	2	91

=== Clean sheets ===
Rank	No.	Player	Série A	Copa do Brasil	Libertadores	Carioca	Other (Note: Includes Supercopa do Brasil.)	Total
1	1	(Brazil) Diego Alves	9 / 26	4 / 6	4 / 11	2 / 5	0 / 1	19 / 49
2	22	(Brazil) Gabriel Batista	2 / 5	2 / 2	0 / 2	3 / 6	—	7 / 15
3	45	(Brazil) Hugo Souza	3 / 7	—	—	1 / 4	—	4 / 11
4	37	(Brazil) César	—	—	—	—	—	—
Total			14 / 38	6 / 8	4 / 13	5 / 15	0 / 1	29 / 75

=== Season records ===
==== Individual ====
- Most matches played in the season in all competitions: 63 – Vitinho
- Most League matches played in the season: 35 – Michael
- Most matches played as starter in the season in all competitions: 54 – Willian Arão
- Most League matches played as starter in the season: 29 – Willian Arão
- Most matches played as substitute in the season in all competitions: 32 – Vitinho
- Most League matches played as substitute in the season: 15 – Rodinei
- Most goals in the season in all competitions: 34 – Gabriel Barbosa
- Most League goals in the season: 14 – Michael
- Most clean sheets in the season in all competitions: 19 – Diego Alves
- Most League clean sheets in the season: 9 – Diego Alves
- Most goals scored in a match: 3
  - Pedro vs Volta Redonda, Campeonato Carioca, 1 May 2021
  - Gabriel Barbosa vs Bahia, Série A, 18 July 2021
  - Bruno Henrique vs São Paulo, Série A, 25 July 2021
  - Gabriel Barbosa vs Santos, Série A, 28 August 2021
- Goals in consecutive matches in all competitions: 4 consecutive match(es)
  - Michael, 5 November 2021 to 14 November 2021
- Goals in consecutive League matches: 4 consecutive match(es)
  - Michael, 5 November 2021 to 14 November 2021
- Fastest goal: 23 seconds
  - Gabriel Barbosa vs São Paulo, Série A, 14 November 2021
- Hat-tricks:
  - Pedro vs Volta Redonda, Campeonato Carioca, 1 May 2021
  - Gabriel Barbosa vs Bahia, Série A, 18 July 2021
  - Bruno Henrique vs São Paulo, Série A, 25 July 2021
  - Gabriel Barbosa vs Santos, Série A, 28 August 2021

==== Team ====
- Biggest home win in all competitions:
  - 6–0 vs ABC, Copa do Brasil, 29 July 2021
- Biggest League home win:
  - 5–1 v São Paulo, Série A, 25 July 2021
- Biggest away win in all competitions:
  - 5–0 vs Bahia, Série A, 18 July 2021
- Biggest League away win:
  - 5–0 v Bahia, Série A, 18 July 2021
- Biggest home loss in all competitions:
  - 0–4 vs Internacional, Série A, 8 August 2021
- Biggest League home loss:
  - 0–4 v Internacional, Série A, 8 August 2021
- Biggest away loss in all competitions:
  - 0–2 vs Atlético Goianiense, Série A, 9 December 2021
- Biggest League away loss:
  - 1–2 v Atlético Goianiense, Série A, 9 December 2021
- Highest scoring match in all competitions:
  - 5–1 vs Madureira, Campeonato Carioca, 5 April 2021
  - 5–1 vs São Paulo, Série A, 25 July 2021
  - 6–0 vs ABC, Copa do Brasil, 29 July 2021
  - 5–1 vs Olimpia, Copa Libertadores, 18 August 2021
- Highest scoring League match:
  - 5–1 vs São Paulo, Série A, 25 July 2021
- Longest winning run in all competitions: 8 consecutive matches
  - 11 July 2021 to 5 August 2021
- Longest League winning run: 4 consecutive matches
  - 11 July 2021 to 1 August 2021
  - 11 November 2021 to 20 November 2021
- Longest unbeaten run in all competitions: 17 consecutive matches
  - 17 April 2021 to 16 June 2021
- Longest League unbeaten run: 11 consecutive matches
  - 30 October 2021 to 3 December 2021
- Longest losing run in all competitions: 2 consecutive matches
  - 4 July 2021 to 7 July 2021
  - 6 December 2021 to 9 December 2021
- Longest League losing run: 2 consecutive matches
  - 4 July 2021 to 7 July 2021
  - 6 December 2021 to 9 December 2021
- Longest without win run in all competitions: 4 consecutive matches
  - 28 August 2021 to 15 September 2021
- Longest without League win run: 3 consecutive matches
  - 3 December 2021 to 9 December 2021
- Longest scoring run in all competitions: 19 consecutive matches
  - 19 March 2021 to 22 May 2021
- Longest League scoring run: 12 consecutive matches
  - 23 October 2021 to 3 December 2021
- Longest without scoring run in all competitions: 2 consecutive matches
  - 6 December 2021 to 9 December 2021
- Longest League without scoring run: 2 consecutive matches
  - 6 December 2021 to 9 December 2021
- Longest conceding goals run in all competitions: 7 consecutive matches
  - 5 April 2021 to 27 April 2021
  - 20 November 2021 to 9 December 2021
- Longest League conceding goals run: 6 consecutive matches
  - 20 November 2021 to 9 December 2021
- Longest without conceding goals run in all competitions: 5 consecutive matches
  - 27 May 2021 to 16 June 2021
- Longest League without conceding goals run: 3 consecutive matches
  - 11 November 2021 to 17 November 2021

=== National Team statistics ===
As of 14 October 2021

Appearances and goals while playing for Flamengo.

No.	Pos.	Name	Nat. Team	Friendlies		FIFA WCQ		Copa América		Olympics		Total	
No.	Pos.	Name	Nat. Team	Apps	Goals	Apps	Goals	Apps	Goals	Apps	Goals	Apps	Goals
3	DF	(Brazil) Rodrigo Caio	Brazil	–	–	0	0	–	–	–	–	0	0
7	AM	(Brazil) Éverton Ribeiro	Brazil	–	–	4	2	4	1	–	–	8	3
8	CM	(Brazil) Gerson	Brazil U23	2	0	–	–	–	–	–	–	2	0
9	CF	(Brazil) Gabriel Barbosa	Brazil	–	–	7	2	5	1	–	–	12	3
14	AM	(Uruguay) Giorgian de Arrascaeta	Uruguay	–	–	4	3	4	0	–	–	8	3
21	CF	(Brazil) Pedro	Brazil U23	2	3	–	–	–	–	–	–	2	3
26	DM	(Paraguay) Robert Piris Da Motta	Paraguay	–	–	0	0	3	0	–	–	3	0
44	DF	(Chile) Mauricio Isla	Chile	–	–	8	1	5	0	–	–	13	1

== Individual awards ==
Name	Position	Nat.	Award
Gabriel Barbosa	FW	(Brazil)	Copa Libertadores Top Goal Scorer; Campeonato Carioca Team of the Year
Michael	FW	(Brazil)	Campeonato Brasileiro Série A Team of the Year; Best Fan's Player (Prêmio Craque do Brasileirão); Campeonato Brasileiro Série A Most Beautiful Goal (Prêmio Craque do Brasileirão); Campeonato Carioca Team of the Year
Andreas Pereira	MF	(Brazil)	Campeonato Brasileiro Série A Most Beautiful Goal (Bola de Prata)
Giorgian de Arrascaeta	MF	(Uruguay)	Campeonato Carioca Team of the Year
Gerson	MF	(Brazil)	Campeonato Carioca Team of the Year
Filipe Luís	DF	(Brazil)	Campeonato Carioca Team of the Year
Matheuzinho	DF	(Brazil)	Campeonato Carioca Team of the Year
