= Gabriel Batista =

Brazilian footballer (born 1998)

Personal information
- Full name: Gabriel Batista de Souza
- Date of birth: 3 June 1998 (age 28)
- Place of birth: São Gonçalo, Brazil
- Height: 1.90 m (6 ft 3 in)
- Position: Goalkeeper

Team information
- Current team: Botafogo
- Number: 12

Youth career
- 2012: Canto do Rio
- 2013: Audax Rio
- 2014–2017: Flamengo

Senior career*
Years	Team	Apps	(Gls)
2017–2022	Flamengo	23	(0)
2022	→ Sampaio Corrêa (loan)	9	(0)
2022–2026	Santa Clara	126	(0)
2026–	Botafogo	7	(0)

International career
2015	Brazil U17	0	(0)
	Brazil U20	0	(0)
- * Club domestic league appearances and goals as of 9 November 2026

Gabriel Batista de Souza (born 3 June 1998) is a Brazilian professional football player who plays as goalkeeper for Botafogo.

== Club career ==
=== Early career ===
Gabriel started playing futsal at Canto do Rio before moving to Audax Rio. In 2014 he finally moved to Flamengo at the age of 14.

=== Flamengo ===
In 2017 Gabriel was promoted to Flamengo's professional team. He started his first game on 17 January 2018 against Volta Redonda for the Campeonato Carioca.

On 31 October 2019, Gabriel played his first Campeonato Brasileiro Série A match replacing Vitinho on the 88th minute after César has been sent off, he conceded the equalizer on the 94th minute as Flamengo draw 2–2 with Goiás.

==== Sampaio Corrêa loan ====
On 20 January 2022, Batista joined Sampaio Corrêa on a season-long loan.

=== Santa Clara ===
On 17 August 2022, Batista moved on a free transfer to Portuguese side Santa Clara.

== Career statistics ==
=== Club ===
As of match played 2 May 2026

Appearances and goals by club, season and competition
Club	Season	League			State League		National cup		League cup		Continental		Other		Total	
Club	Season	Division	Apps	Goals	Apps	Goals	Apps	Goals	Apps	Goals	Apps	Goals	Apps	Goals	Apps	Goals
Flamengo	2017	Série A	0	0	0	0	0	0	—		0	0	—		0	0
Flamengo	2018	Série A	0	0	3 (Note: Appearance(s) in Campeonato Carioca)	0	0	0	—		0	0	—		3	0
Flamengo	2019	Série A	1	0	1	0	0	0	—		0	0	0	0	2	0
Flamengo	2020	Série A	3	0	4	0	0	0	—		0	0	0	0	7	0
Flamengo	2021	Série A	5	0	6	0	2	0	—		2 (Note: Appearance(s) in Copa Libertadores)	0	—		14	0
Flamengo	Total		9	0	14	0	2	0	—		2	0	0	0	27	0
Sampaio Corrêa (loan)	2022	Série B	9	0	—		0	0	—		—		3 (Note: Appearance(s) in Copa do Nordeste)	0	12	0
Santa Clara	2022–23	Primeira Liga	26	0	—		1	0	2	0	—		—		29	0
Santa Clara	2023–24	Liga Portugal 2	34	0	—		0	0	1	0	—		—		35	0
Santa Clara	2024–25	Primeira Liga	34	0	—		0	0	1	0	—		—		35	0
Santa Clara	2025–26	Primeira Liga	32	0	—		0	0	1	0	6 (Note: Appearances in UEFA Conference League)	0	—		39	0
Santa Clara	Total		126	0	—		1	0	5	0	6	0	—		138	0
Career total			144	0	14	0	4	0	10	0	2	0	3	0	177	0

== Honours ==
Flamengo

- Copa Libertadores: 2019
- Recopa Sudamericana: 2020
- Campeonato Brasileiro Série A: 2019, 2020
- Supercopa do Brasil: 2020, 2021
- Campeonato Carioca: 2019, 2020, 2021

Santa Clara

- Liga Portugal 2: 2023–24
