= Thiago Maia =

Brazilian footballer

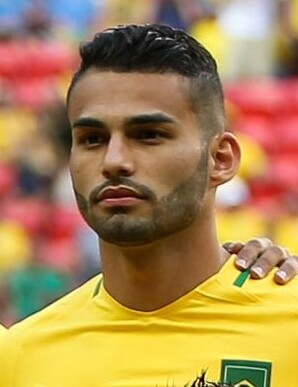
- Thiago Maia with the Brazil U23 team in 2016

Personal information
- Full name: Thiago Maia Alencar
- Date of birth: 23 March 1997 (age 29)
- Place of birth: Boa Vista, Brazil
- Height: 1.80 m (5 ft 11 in)
- Position: Midfielder

Team information
- Current team: Internacional
- Number: 29

Youth career
- Extremo Norte
- 2010–2011: São Caetano
- 2011–2015: Santos

Senior career*
Years	Team	Apps	(Gls)
2014–2017	Santos	101	(3)
2017–2022	Lille	61	(0)
2020–2021	→ Flamengo (loan)	43	(1)
2022–2024	Flamengo	70	(1)
2024	→ Internacional (loan)	10	(0)
2024–	Internacional	64	(5)

International career^{‡}
2013–2014	Brazil U17	8	(0)
2015	Brazil U20	8	(0)
2016–2019	Brazil U23	6	(0)
Medal record
Olympic Games
Gold medal – first place	2016 Rio de Janeiro	Team
- * Club domestic league appearances and goals as of 8 April 2026 ‡ National team caps and goals as of 2 July 2021

Thiago Maia Alencar (born 23 March 1997), known as Thiago Maia, is a Brazilian professional footballer who plays as a midfielder for Campeonato Brasileiro Série A club Internacional.

== Club career ==
=== Santos ===
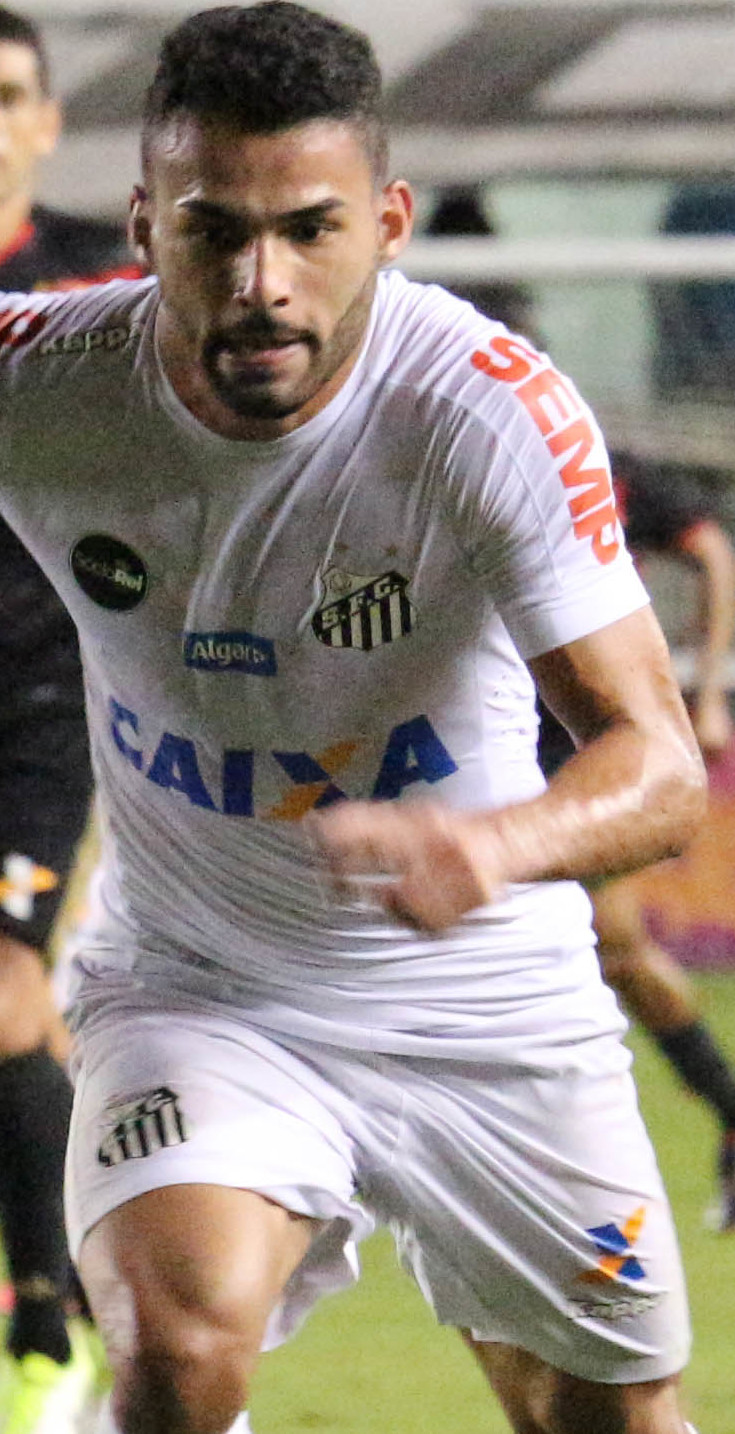
Thiago Maia playing for Santos in 2017

Born in Boa Vista, Roraima, Thiago Maia began his career at lowly locals Extremo Norte. In August 2010 he moved to São Paulo, joining São Caetano's youth categories, and later moved to Santos in the following year.

On 25 October 2014 Thiago Maia made his first-team debut, replacing fellow youth graduate Serginho in a 1–1 away draw against Chapecoense for the Série A championship. During the 2015 campaign, he profited from the injury of Alison, establishing himself as a starter from June and earning plaudits for his performances.

On 22 August 2015 Thiago Maia scored his first professional goal, netting the second in a 5–2 home routing of Avaí. On 13 October, after lengthy negotiations, he renewed his contract until 2019.

Thiago Maia became an undisputed starter during the 2016 campaign, partnering Renato at the heart of the midfield. He was also linked to Chelsea, Juventus and Paris Saint-Germain during the year.

Thiago Maia completed his 100th match for Peixe on 4 March 2017, in a 0–1 derby loss against Corinthians. In his Copa Libertadores debut five days later, he started and scored the equalizer in a 1–1 away draw against Sporting Cristal.

=== Lille ===
On 15 July 2017, French club Lille reached an agreement with Santos for the transfer of Thiago Maia, for a fee of €14 million, after being signed by the head coach Marcelo Bielsa. He made 37 appearances for the club during the 2017–18 season, scoring one goal.

=== Flamengo ===
On 22 January 2020, Maia returned to Brazil, signing with Flamengo on an 18-month loan. An option to make the transfer permanent was included in the deal.

Maia's transfer to Flamengo was made permanent on 13 January 2022.

=== Internacional ===
On 7 March 2024, Internacional announced Thiago Maia on a loan deal until the end of the year, with the conditions for a subsequent permanent deal already agreed. On 3 July, Inter officially bought him outright, with a contract until 2026.

== International career ==
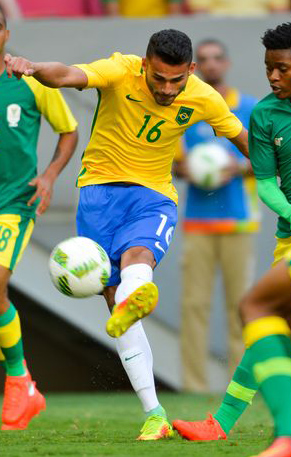
Maia taking a shot at the 2016 Summer Olympics

On 26 December 2014, after featuring regularly with the under-17s, Thiago Maia was called up to the Brazil under-20 side, alongside Santos teammates Gabriel and Caju, for the 2015 South American Youth Football Championship.

On 29 June 2016 Thiago Maia was called up to Olympic team, alongside Santos teammates Gabriel and Zeca, for the 2016 Summer Olympics in Rio de Janeiro. He also became the first athlete from Roraima to appear in the tournament.

== Personal life ==
On 17 December 2024, Thiago Maia received the year's FIFA Fair Play Award after volunteering during the 2024 Rio Grande do Sul floods.

== Career statistics ==
As of 27 February 2025

Appearances and goals by club, season and competition
Club	Season	League			State league (Note: Includes Campeonato Paulista, Campeonato Carioca, Campeonato Gaúcho)		National cup (Note: Includes Copa do Brasil, Coupe de France)		Continental		Other		Total	
Club	Season	Division	Apps	Goals	Apps	Goals	Apps	Goals	Apps	Goals	Apps	Goals	Apps	Goals
Santos	2014	Série A	1	0	—		0	0	—		—		1	0
Santos	2015	Série A	28	2	—		9	0	—		—		37	2
Santos	2016	Série A	31	0	17	0	4	0	—		—		52	0
Santos	2017	Série A	12	1	12	0	2	0	6 (Note: Appearance(s) in Copa Libertadores)	1	—		32	2
Santos	Total		72	3	29	0	15	0	6	1	—		122	4
Lille	2017–18	Ligue 1	34	0	—		1	1	—		2 (Note: Appearance(s) in the Coupe de la Ligue)	0	37	1
Lille	2018–19	Ligue 1	24	0	—		1	0	—		1	0	26	0
Lille	2019–20	Ligue 1	3	0	—		0	0	1 (Note: Appearance(s) in UEFA Champions League)	0	0	0	4	0
Lille	Total		61	0	—		2	1	1	0	3	0	67	1
Flamengo (loan)	2020	Série A	14	0	6	0	3	0	5	0	1 (Note: Appearance(s) in Recopa Sudamericana)	0	29	0
Flamengo (loan)	2021	Série A	23	1	0	0	5	1	3	0	0	0	31	2
Flamengo	2022	Série A	24	0	3	0	8	0	10	0	0	0	45	0
Flamengo	2023	Série A	32	0	10	1	10	1	7	0	5 (Note: Two appearances in FIFA Club World Cup, one appearance in Supercopa do Brasil, two appearances in Recopa Sudamericana)	0	64	2
Flamengo	2024	Série A	0	0	1	0	0	0	0	0	—		1	0
Flamengo	Total		93	1	20	1	26	2	25	0	6	0	170	4
Internacional	2024	Série A	27	2	—		0	0	5 (Note: Appearance(s) in Copa Sudamericana)	0	—		32	2
Internacional	2025	Série A	0	0	7	0	0	0	0	0	—		7	0
Internacional	Total		27	2	7	0	0	0	5	0	—		39	2
Career total			253	6	56	1	53	3	37	1	9	0	418	11

== Honours ==
Santos

- Campeonato Paulista: 2016

Flamengo

- Recopa Sudamericana: 2020
- Campeonato Brasileiro Série A: 2020
- Copa do Brasil: 2022
- Supercopa do Brasil: 2020, 2021
- Campeonato Carioca: 2020, 2021
- Copa Libertadores: 2022

Internacional

- Campeonato Gaúcho: 2025
- Recopa Gaúcha: 2026

Brazil U23

- Olympic Gold Medal: 2016

Individual

- Campeonato Paulista Team of the Year: 2016
- Troféu Mesa Redonda Team of the Year: 2024
- FIFA Fair Play Award: 2024
