= Hugo Moura =

Brazilian footballer (born 1998)

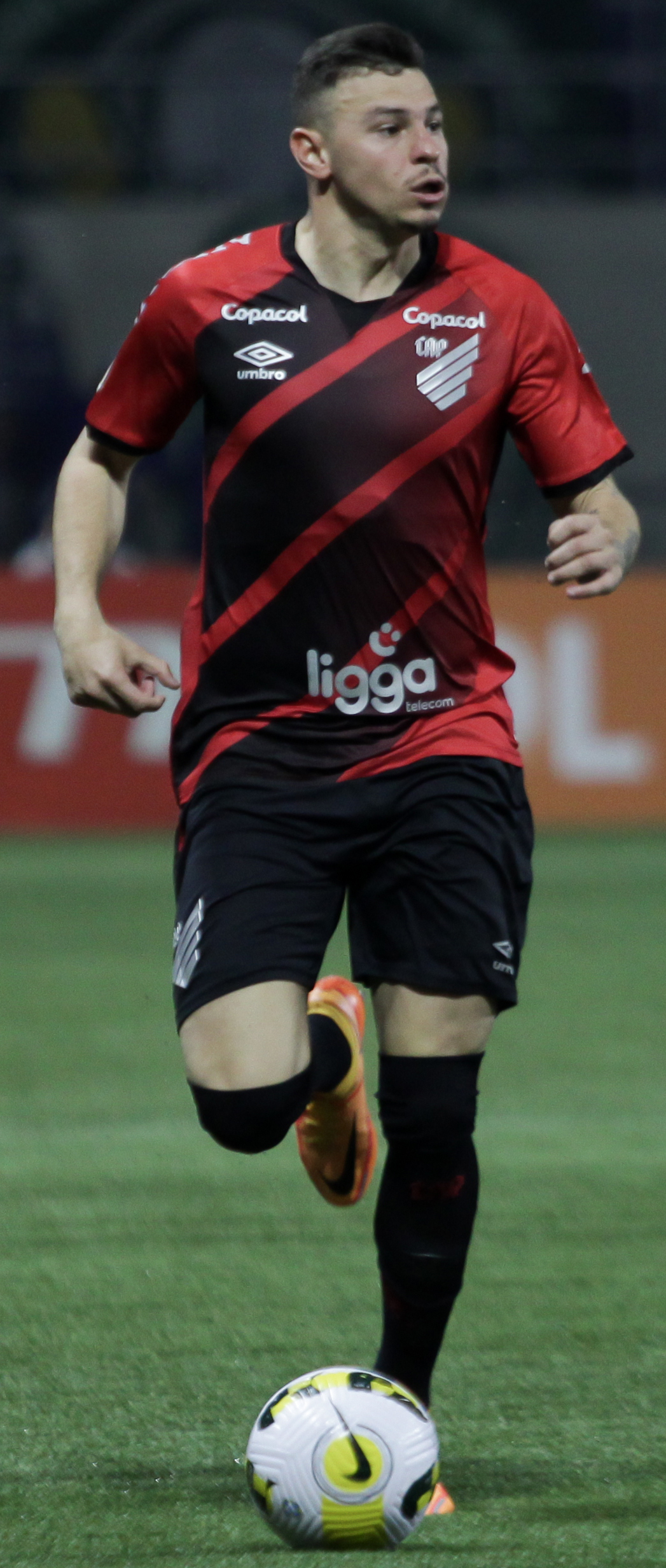

Personal information
- Full name: Hugo Moura Arruda da Silva
- Date of birth: 3 January 1998 (age 28)
- Place of birth: Rio Claro, Brazil
- Height: 1.77 m (5 ft 10 in)
- Position: Defensive midfielder

Team information
- Current team: Al-Fayha

Youth career
- 2010–2018: Flamengo

Senior career*
Years	Team	Apps	(Gls)
2018–2022	Flamengo	26	(1)
2020	→ Coritiba (loan)	28	(1)
2021	→ Lugano (loan)	0	(0)
2022	→ Athletico Paranaense (loan)	13	(1)
2022–2024	Athletico Paranaense	64	(1)
2024	→ Vasco da Gama (loan)	30	(1)
2025–2026	Vasco da Gama	55	(0)
2026–	Al-Fayha	12	(3)
- * Club domestic league appearances and goals as of 31 October 2026

Hugo Moura Arruda da Silva (born 3 January 1998), is a Brazilian professional footballer who plays as a defensive midfielder for Al-Fayha.

== Club career ==
=== Flamengo ===
Born in Rio de Janeiro, Moura joined the youth setup of Flamengo at the age of 12. In 2016, he suffered an injury and was ruled out of Copa São Paulo de Futebol Júnior. On 17 January 2018, he made his first team debut in a 2–0 win against Volta Redonda, in Campeonato Carioca. Eight days later, he captained the under-20 team to their Copa São Paulo de Futebol Júnior final victory against São Paulo.

On 23 November 2018, Moura was promoted to the senior team for the upcoming season. On 3 September 2019, Flamengo extended contract with Moura until December 2023.

On 5 May 2019 Moura played his first Campeonato Brasileiro Série A match at Morumbi Stadium against São Paulo, he started the match as head coach Abel Braga fielded the whole team with reserves, the match ended 1–1.

==== Loan to Coritiba ====
On 31 August 2020, Moura transferred to Coritiba on loan until the end of the 2020 Campeonato Brasileiro Série A.

==== Loan to Lugano ====
On 25 August 2021, Swiss club Lugano announced that they are forced to terminate Moura's loan that was arranged a month earlier due to failing Swiss Super League regulations.

=== Athletico Paranaense ===
On 5 January 2022, Moura moved to Athletico Paranaense on a one-year loan until 31 December 2022 with an option to buy clause. On 19 July, Athletico exercised his buyout clause and agreed to pay a €1.2m fee to retain his services.

== Career statistics ==
As of 28 February 2023.

Club	Season	League			State League		Cup		Continental		Other		Total	
Club	Season	Division	Apps	Goals	Apps	Goals	Apps	Goals	Apps	Goals	Apps	Goals	Apps	Goals
Flamengo	2018	Série A	0	0	1 (Note: Appearance(s) in Campeonato Carioca.)	0	0	0	—		—		1	0
Flamengo	2019	Série A	1	0	5	0	0	0	0	0	—		6	0
Flamengo	2020	Série A	0	0	4	0	0	0	0	0	0	0	4	0
Flamengo	2021	Série A	5	0	10	1	2	0	3 (Note: Appearance(s) in Copa Libertadores.)	0	0	0	20	1
Flamengo	Total		6	0	20	1	2	0	3	0	0	0	31	1
Coritiba (loan)	2020	Série A	28	1	—		—		—		—		28	1
Lugano (loan)	2021–22	Swiss Super League	0	0	—		1	0	—		—		1	0
Athletico Paranaense (loan)	2022	Série A	13	1	—		3	1	7	0	2 (Note: Appearance(s) in Recopa Sudamericana.)	0	25	2
Athletico Paranaense	2022	Série A	12	0	—		3	0	4	0	—		18	0
Athletico Paranaense	2023	Série A	30	0	11 (Note: Appearance(s) in Campeonato Paranaense.)	0	2	0	5	0	—		48	0
Athletico Paranaense	2024	Série A	0	0	11	0	—		1 (Note: Appearance(s) in Copa Sudamericana.)	0	—		12	0
Athletico Paranaense	Total		42	0	22	0	5	0	10	0	2	0	78	0
Career total			89	2	42	1	11	1	20	0	2	0	164	4

== Honours ==
Flamengo

- Copa Libertadores: 2019
- Recopa Sudamericana: 2020
- Campeonato Brasileiro Série A: 2019
- Supercopa do Brasil: 2020, 2021
- Campeonato Carioca: 2019, 2020, 2021

Athletico Paranaense

- Campeonato Paranaense: 2023
