= Rodrigo Muniz (Brazilian footballer) =

Brazilian footballer (born 2001)

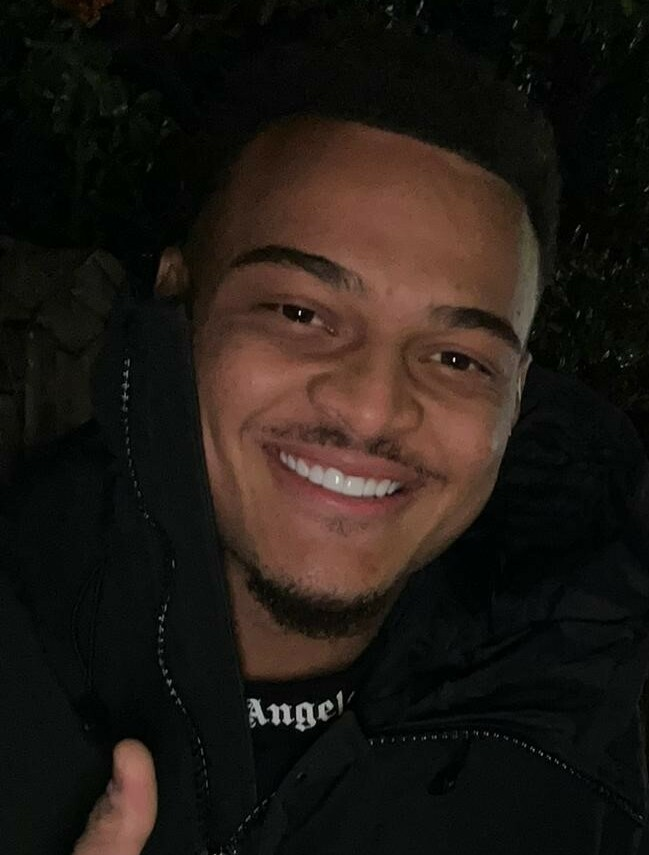
- Muniz in 2023

Personal information
- Full name: Rodrigo Muniz Carvalho
- Date of birth: 4 May 2001 (age 25)
- Place of birth: São Domingos do Prata, Brazil
- Height: 1.85 m (6 ft 1 in)
- Position: Forward

Team information
- Current team: Fulham
- Number: 9

Youth career
- 2016–2018: Desportivo Brasil
- 2018–2020: Flamengo

Senior career*
Years	Team	Apps	(Gls)
2020–2021	Flamengo	29	(9)
2020	→ Coritiba (loan)	6	(1)
2021–	Fulham	112	(25)
2022–2023	→ Middlesbrough (loan)	17	(2)
- * Club domestic league appearances and goals as of 21:35, 21 November 2026 (UTC)

Rodrigo Muniz Carvalho (born 4 May 2001) is a Brazilian professional footballer who plays as a forward for Premier League club Fulham.

== Career ==
=== Early life ===
Born in São Domingos do Prata, Muniz started his career with Desportivo Brasil, who he played for between 2016 and 2018. By doing so, Muniz moved out of his parents's house when he was fourteen years old. Initially, Muniz had difficulty settling in but he was able to overcome the obstacles, thanks to his mother.

Muniz progressed throughout his time at Desportivo Brasil, where at one point, he helped the club finish as runners-up at the end of the 2016 season and was the top scorer with 34 goals in all competitions. The 2017 season saw Muniz was a top scorer for Desportivo Brasil once again with 25 goals. Years after leaving Desportivo Brasil, Muniz was inducted to the club's Hall of Fame.

=== Flamengo ===
On 20 January 2018, Muniz joined Flamengo from Deportivo Brasil as a youth player, along with teammate Bruninho. In his first season at Flamengo as a youth player, he helped the club's youth team win the Copa do Brasil Sub-17 by beating Fluminense’s youth team 1–0 on 21 December 2018. In his second season at Flamengo as a youth player, Muniz helped the club's youth team win four trophies. During the 2019 season, he scored two hat–tricks, coming against Real Ariquemes and Boavista’s youth teams. Muniz also signed his first professional contract with Flamengo, keeping him until 2024.

Ahead of the 2020 season, Muniz was called up to the Flamengo's first team for the pre–season. He scored his first goal for the club on 25 January 2020, in a 3–2 win against Volta Redonda in the Campeonato Carioca. After his loan spell at Coritiba ended, Muniz made his debut for the club, coming on as a 82nd minute substitute, in a 1–0 win against Botafogo on 5 December 2020. His involvement in the first team at Flamengo saw the club win the league. At the end of the 2020 season, he went on to make four appearances for Flamengo, all coming on as a substitute.

Ahead of the 2021 season, Muniz was given more first team chance under the management of Rogério Ceni. He then scored a brace for Flamengo, in a 2–0 win against Macaé on 6 March 2021. Muniz then scored three more goals in the Campeonato Carioca, including another brace against Resende FC on 19 March 2021. Despite sitting out for the remaining matches of the Campeonato Carioca, his contributions saw the club win the tournament. His performance was noticed by the Spanish media. As a result, he was linked a move away from the club, with clubs from Brazil, Europe and Middle East were interested in signing him. Amid to the transfer speculation, Muniz scored four more goals for Flamengo, including a further brace against Red Bull Bragantino on 19 June 2021. For his performance against Red Bull Bragantino, he was awarded by ESPN's "Prêmio Bola de Prata". By the time Muniz left the club, he made twenty–five appearances and scored nine times in all competitions.

==== Coritiba (loan) ====
On 13 October 2020, Muniz moved to Coritiba on loan until the end of the 2020 season.

He made his debut for Coritiba, starting a match and played 64 minutes before being substituted, in a 3–1 win against Palmieras on 14 October 2020. A week later on 25 October 2020, Muniz scored his first goal for Coritiba, in a 3–1 lost against Ceará. But after only six appearances and one goal for Coritiba, he was asked to return to Flamengo.

=== Fulham ===
On 13 August 2021, Muniz travelled to Spain for a fourteen day quarantine before going to England to sign with Fulham. On the same day Flamengo and Fulham reached an agreement for a €8m transfer fee with the Brazilian club keeping 20% of a future transfer. Both clubs officially announced the transfer on 20 August.

He scored his first goal for Fulham in a 2–1 loss to Reading on 18 September. Since joining the club, Muniz has spoken about settling in England and learning from manager Marco Silva, who convinced him to join Fulham. He also became a second fiddle striker, due to Aleksandar Mitrović being preferred. Muniz later scored two more braces for the club, coming against Blackburn Rovers and Stoke City. Despite suffering a calf injury later in the 2021–22 season, he recovered and was part of the Fulham's squad that contributed to the club's promotion to the Premier League. At the end of the 2021–22 season, Muniz went on to make twenty–five appearances and scoring five times in all competitions.

==== Middlesbrough (loan) ====
On 21 August 2022, Muniz signed for Championship club Middlesbrough on a season-long loan. Upon joining the club, he took the number nine shirt.

Muniz made his debut for Middlesbrough, coming on as a 57th minute substitute, in a 1–2 loss against Swansea City on 27 August 2022. In a follow–up match, he scored his first goal for the club in a 2–1 loss against Watford on 30 August. Two weeks later on 13 September 2022, he scored again, in a 3–2 loss against Cardiff City. However, his first team opportunities at Middlesbrough soon became limited under newly appointed manager Michael Carrick and found his playing time from the substitute bench. This led to reports that Fulham was planning on recalling Muniz and send him to a different club to get more first team football. But manager Carrick explained that his knee injury was the factor of getting less playing time and insisted that he's got a part to play. Having not played since December, Muniz played one more match for the club, in a 2–1 loss against Luton Town on 24 April 2023. At the end of the 2022–23 season, which saw Middlesbrough eliminated in the play–offs, he made seventeen appearances and scoring twice in all competitions; and returned to his parent club.

==== Return to Fulham ====
In the 2023–24 season, Muniz, Raúl Jiménez and Carlos Vinícius were Fulham's main strikers following the sale of Mitrović. They suffered a goal drought in the first half of the season, which came under criticism by the London Evening Standard. Despite this, he scored his first goal of the season on 1 November 2023, in a 3–1 win against Ipswich Town in the fourth round of the League Cup. In his Premier League start against Manchester United on 4 November 2023, Muniz suffered a knee injury and substituted in the 76th minute, as Fulham lost 1–0. After being sidelined for "three to four weeks" with a knee injury, he returned to the first team, coming on as a 61st minute substitute, in a 3–0 loss against Newcastle United on 16 December 2023. Due to little playing time, Muniz was linked a move away from the club, as English and Brazilian clubs were interested in signing but he stay put. Muniz scored his first Premier League goal, in a 2–2 draw against Burnley on 3 February 2024, followed up by scoring a brace, in a 3–1 win against AFC Bournemouth. After the match, Muniz's performance was praised by Match of the Day’s pundit, Alan Shearer, who said that he "really upset the Bournemouth defenders in every way". His goal-scoring form continued throughout March, scoring against twice against Tottenham Hotspur and a bicycle kick against Sheffield United. This later earned him an award for Premier League Player of the Month, becoming the first Fulham player in fourteen years to receive it. His bicycle kick goal against Sheffield United also earned him the club's Goal of the Season. Due to the departure of Vinícius and the injury of Jiménez, he regained his first team place as a starting forward. Muniz scored his ninth league goal of the season, in a 1–1 draw against Crystal Palace on 27 April 2024. By the end of the 2023–24 season, he appeared thirty-three times while scoring ten goals in all competitions.

On 26 December 2024, Muniz scored a stoppage time winning goal in a 2–1 away victory over West London rivals Chelsea, sealing Fulham's first win at Stamford Bridge since 1979.

== Personal life ==
Muniz is the son of an axé singer and inherited his passion of football from his father. He said he grew up idolising Zlatan Ibrahimović. Muniz speaks English, having taken lessons to learn the language since joining Fulham. He is married. An interview in April 2024 with BBC's Football Focus caused a clip of Muniz to go viral where he listed the three things most important to him as "God, Football, Fish" in that order.

== Career statistics ==
As of match played 21 November 2026

Appearances and goals by club, season and competition
Club	Season	League			State league (Note: Includes Campeonato Carioca)		National cup (Note: Includes Copa do Brasil, FA Cup)		League cup (Note: Includes EFL Cup)		Continental		Other		Total	
Club	Season	Division	Apps	Goals	Apps	Goals	Apps	Goals	Apps	Goals	Apps	Goals	Apps	Goals	Apps	Goals
Flamengo	2020	Série A	4	0	3	1	—		—		0	0	0	0	7	1
Flamengo	2021	Série A	9	3	13	5	2	1	—		1 (Note: Appearance in Copa Libertadores)	0	0	0	25	9
Flamengo	Total		13	3	16	6	2	1	—		1	0	0	0	32	10
Coritiba (loan)	2020	Série A	6	1	—		—		—		—		—		6	1
Fulham	2021–22	Championship	25	5	—		2	0	1	0	—		—		28	5
Fulham	2023–24	Premier League	26	9	—		2	0	5	1	—		—		33	10
Fulham	2024–25	Premier League	31	8	—		4	3	1	0	—		—		36	11
Fulham	2025–26	Premier League	21	1	—		2	0	2	0	—		—		25	1
Fulham	2026–27	Premier League	9	2	—		0	0	3	2	—		—		12	4
Fulham	Total		111	24	—		10	3	12	3	—		—		133	30
Middlesbrough (loan)	2022–23	Championship	17	2	—		1	0	—		—		—		18	2
Career total			164	31	16	6	13	4	12	3	1	0	0	0	190	44

== Honours ==
Flamengo

- Campeonato Brasileiro Série A: 2020
- Supercopa do Brasil: 2021
- Campeonato Carioca: 2021

Fulham

- EFL Championship: 2021–22

Individual

- Premier League Player of the Month: March 2024
