= Rodrigo Caio =

Brazilian footballer (born 1993)

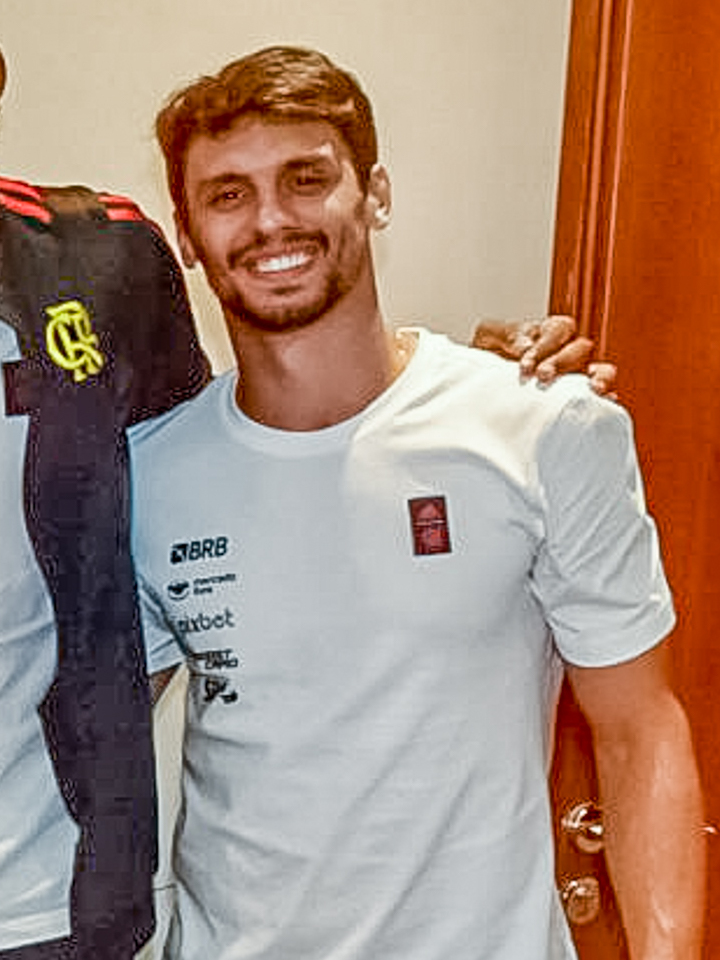

Personal information
- Full name: Rodrigo Caio Coquette Russo
- Date of birth: 17 August 1993 (age 33)
- Place of birth: Dracena, Brazil
- Height: 1.82 m (6 ft 0 in)
- Position: Centre-back

Team information
- Current team: Flamengo (assistant)

Youth career
- 2005–2013: São Paulo

Senior career*
Years	Team	Apps	(Gls)
2011–2018	São Paulo	212	(11)
2019–2023	Flamengo	110	(3)
2024	Grêmio	5	(0)
Total		327	(14)

International career^{‡}
2012	Brazil U20	4	(1)
2014	Brazil U21	5	(2)
2015–2016	Brazil U23	6	(1)
2016–2020	Brazil	5	(0)

Managerial career
- 2025–: Flamengo (assistant)
Medal record
Olympic Games
Gold medal – first place	2016 Rio de Janeiro	Team
- * Club domestic league appearances and goals as of 13 December 2024 ‡ National team caps and goals as of 14 October 2020

Rodrigo Caio Coquette Russo (born 17 August 1993), known as Rodrigo Caio, is a Brazilian football coach and former player who played as a centre-back. He is the current assistant coach of Campeonato Brasileiro Série A club Flamengo.

== Playing career ==
=== São Paulo ===
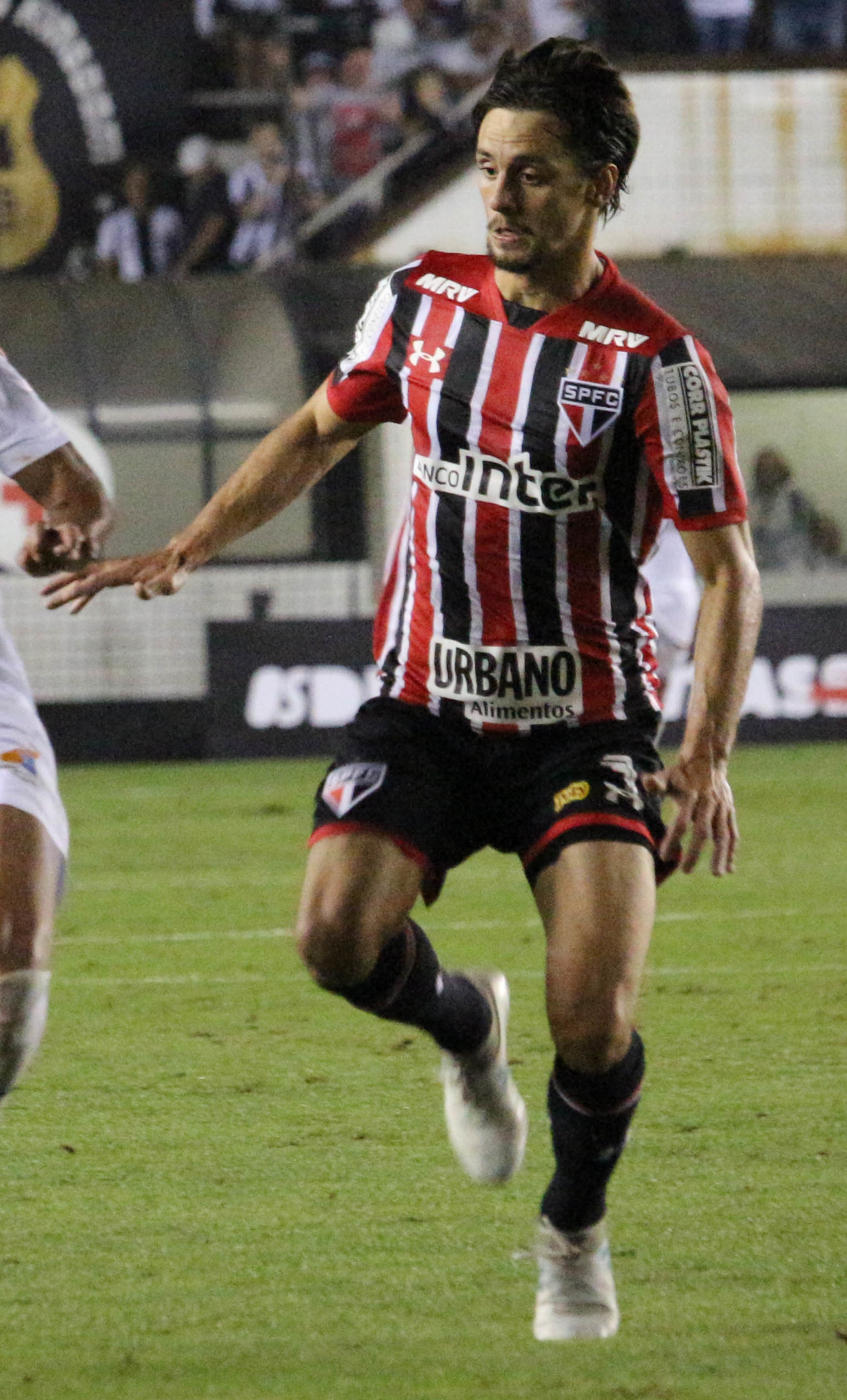
Rodrigo Caio playing for São Paulo in 2017.

Born in Dracena, São Paulo, Rodrigo Caio is a product of São Paulo FC's academy and started his career as a defensive midfielder. In 2012, in a 3–2 win against Santos FC in the State League, he played as right back, with the responsibility of marking Neymar. After the game, Caio was praised by press for his success in holding down the santista forward. He executed the movimento do escorpião (In English, Scorpion Movement), a well known move in indoor soccer, to prevent some dribbles and shots from Neymar.

In 2013, with Paulo Miranda and Edson Silva injured, Rodrigo Caio started playing as a centre back. After good performances, he was praised by coach Paulo Autuori who highlighted his contribution to São Paulo's defense. Caio continued to perform so well that Antônio Carlos, hired by the club in the middle of the Brazilian League season, was mostly confined to the substitutes' bench.

On 2 August 2014, Rodrigo Caio damaged his anterior cruciate ligament, going on to miss a further several months. He returned to the field on 16 March 2015.

On 12 June 2015, it was reported that Rodrigo Caio signed a five-year contract with La Liga side Valencia CF, for a €12.5 million fee plus four million more in add-ons. On 29 June 2015, the transfer to Valencia collapsed after the player failed two medicals.

=== Flamengo ===
On 29 December 2018, Rodrigo Caio joined Flamengo on a contract running until 2023. Flamengo agreed to pay €5 million for 45% of his economic rights from São Paulo, the transfer includes an achievement clause in the next two years that allows the purchase of 30% of his rights for another €2 million.

A regular starter in his first years, Rodrigo Caio struggled severely with injuries from 2021 onwards, and left the club in December 2023, as his contract was due to expire.

=== Grêmio ===
On 3 June 2024, after spending the first half of the season without a club, Rodrigo Caio signed a short-term deal with Grêmio. He left the club in December, after having appeared in just five matches.

== Post-playing career ==
On 13 May 2025, Rodrigo Caio returned to Flamengo after being named Filipe Luís' assistant coach.

== Career statistics ==
=== Club ===
As of match played 5 December 2024.

Club	Season	League			State League		Cup		Continental		Other		Total	
Club	Season	Division	Apps	Goals	Apps	Goals	Apps	Goals	Apps	Goals	Apps	Goals	Apps	Goals
São Paulo	2011	Série A	8	0	—		—		—		—		8	0
São Paulo	2012	Série A	7	0	9 (Note: Appearance(s) in Campeonato Paulista.)	0	3	0	1 (Note: Appearance(s) in Copa Sudamericana.)	0	—		20	0
São Paulo	2013	Série A	36	3	11	1	0	0	8 (Note: Three appearances in Copa Libertadores, Five appearances in Copa Sudamericana.)	0	3 (Note: Two appearances in Recopa Sudamericana, one appearance in J.League Cup / Copa Sudamericana Championship.)	0	58	4
São Paulo	2014	Série A	8	0	13	1	4	0	—		—		25	1
São Paulo	2015	Série A	24	1	4	0	5	0	3 (Note: Appearance(s) in Copa Libertadores.)	0	—		36	1
São Paulo	2016	Série A	20	1	12	2	1	0	13	0	—		46	4
São Paulo	2017	Série A	33	0	11	1	6	0	2	0	—		52	1
São Paulo	2018	Série A	6	0	10	1	6	1	1	0	—		23	2
São Paulo	Total		142	5	70	6	25	1	28	0	3	0	268	13
Flamengo	2019	Série A	29	2	12 (Note: Appearance(s) in Campeonato Carioca.)	1	4	0	12	1	2 (Note: Appearance(s) in FIFA Club World Cup.)	0	59	4
Flamengo	2020	Série A	20	0	7	0	0	0	3	0	2 (Note: One appearance in Recopa Sudamericana, one appearance in Supercopa do Brasil.)	0	32	0
Flamengo	2021	Série A	19	0	4	0	4	0	5	1	1 (Note: Appearance(s) in Supercopa do Brasil.)	0	33	1
Flamengo	2022	Série A	8	0	0	0	2	0	2	0	—		12	0
Flamengo	2023	Série A	5	0	6	0	0	0	2	0	—		13	0
Flamengo	Total		81	2	29	1	10	0	24	2	5	0	149	5
Grêmio	2024	Série A	5	0	—		0	0	—		—		5	0
Career Total			228	7	99	7	35	1	52	2	8	0	422	18

=== International ===
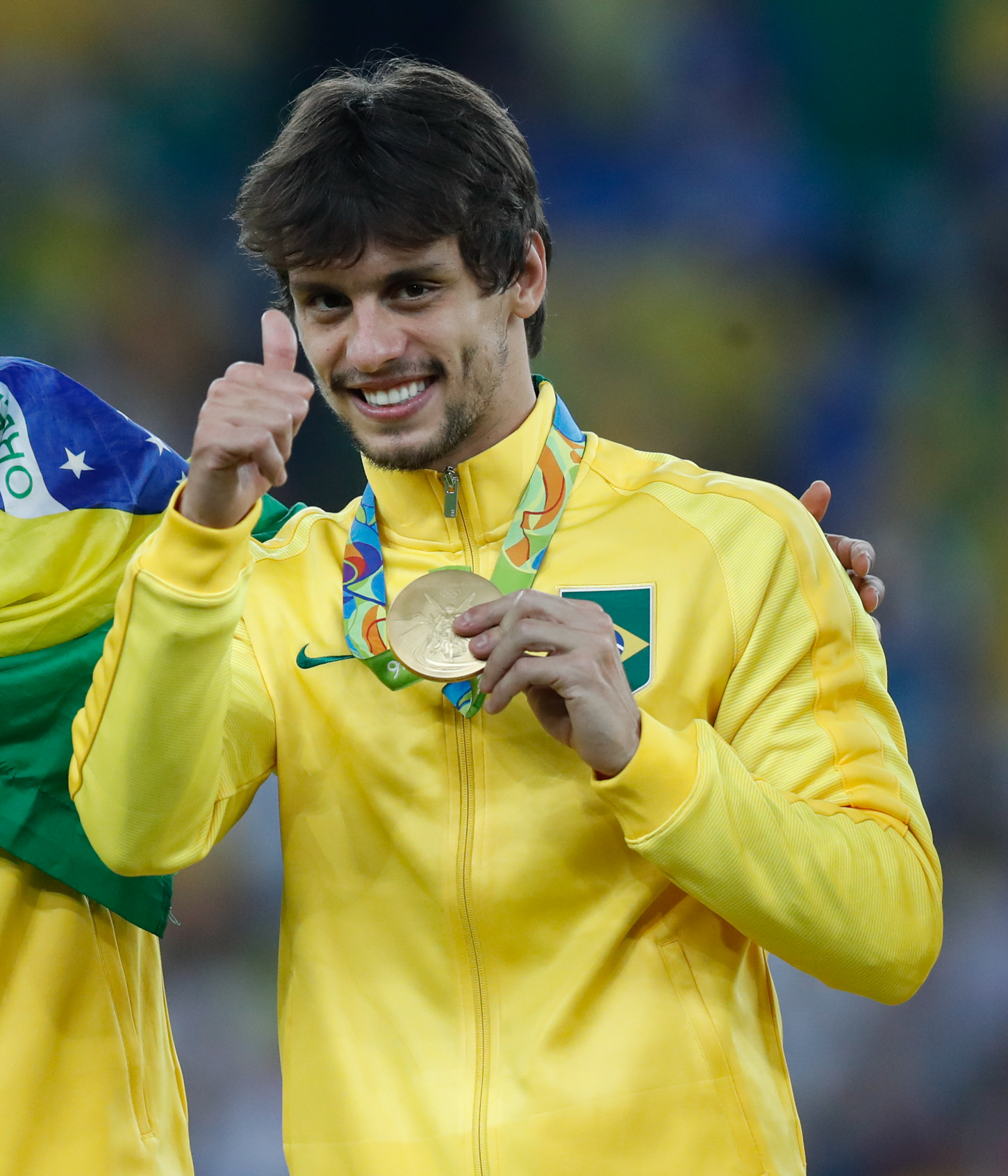
Rodrigo Caio at the 2016 Olympics.

As of match played 13 October 2020.

Brazil
Year	Apps	Goals
2016	1	0
2017	3	0
2020	1	0
Total	5	0

== Honours ==
=== Club ===
São Paulo

- Copa Sudamericana: 2012

Flamengo

- Copa Libertadores: 2019, 2022
- Recopa Sudamericana: 2020
- Campeonato Brasileiro Série A: 2019, 2020
- Copa do Brasil: 2022
- Supercopa do Brasil: 2020, 2021
- Campeonato Carioca: 2019, 2020, 2021

=== International ===
Brazil

- Olympic Gold Medal: 2016

Brazil U20

- Toulon Tournament: 2014

=== Individual ===
- Toulon Tournament Golden Ball: 2014
- South American Team of the Year: 2019
- Campeonato Brasileiro Série A Team of the Year: 2019
- Campeonato Carioca Team of the Year: 2019, 2020
