= João Gomes (footballer, born 2001) =

Brazilian footballer

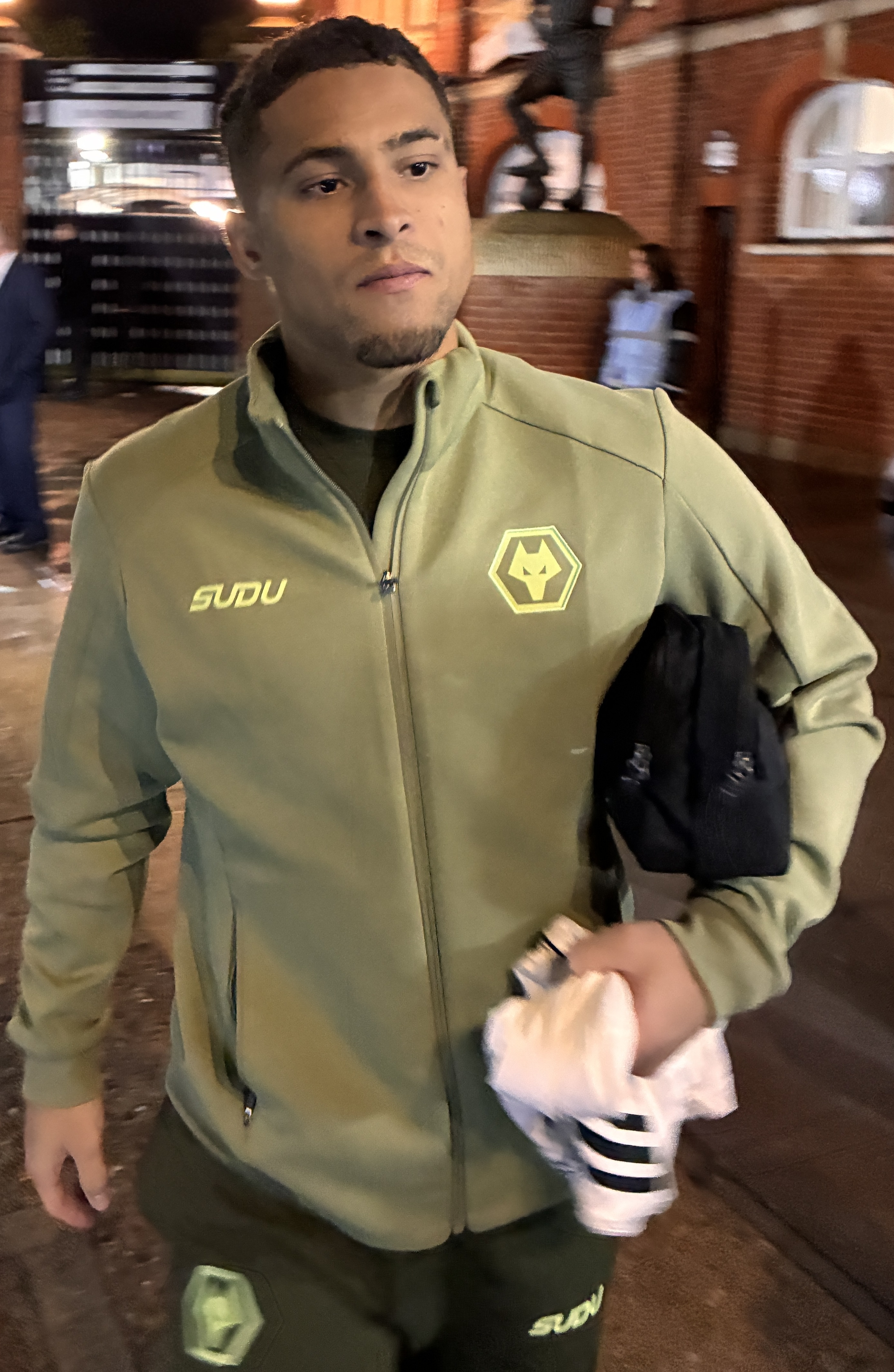
- Gomes with Wolverhampton Wanderers in 2025

Personal information
- Full name: João Victor Gomes da Silva
- Date of birth: 12 February 2001 (age 25)
- Place of birth: Rio de Janeiro, Brazil
- Height: 1.76 m (5 ft 9 in)
- Position: Central midfielder

Team information
- Current team: Aston Villa
- Number: 35

Youth career
- 2009–2020: Flamengo

Senior career*
Years	Team	Apps	(Gls)
2020–2023	Flamengo	86	(1)
2023–2026	Wolverhampton Wanderers	116	(7)
2026–	Aston Villa	4	(0)

International career^{‡}
2024–	Brazil	10	(0)
- * Club domestic league appearances and goals as of 8 November 2026 ‡ National team caps and goals as of 26 March 2025

João Victor Gomes da Silva (Brazilian Portuguese pronunciation: [ʒuˈɐ̃w̃ ˈɡõmis]; born 12 February 2001), known as João Gomes, is a Brazilian professional footballer who plays as a central midfielder for Premier League club Aston Villa and the Brazil national team.

A product of the Flamengo academy, Gomes began his professional career with the club in 2020. He established himself as a key player in the midfield and won several major honours, most notably the 2022 Copa Libertadores. His performances in South America led to a transfer to Wolverhampton Wanderers in January 2023. At international level, Gomes made his senior debut for Brazil in March 2024.

== Club career ==
=== Flamengo ===
After figuring on the bench on 16 October 2020, João Gomes made his professional debut on 1 November 2020, starting for Flamengo in the Série A in a 4–1 home defeat against São Paulo.

Over the next two seasons, Gomes established himself as a vital player in Flamengo's midfield. His breakthrough year came in 2022, during which his energetic performances helped the club secure a continental and domestic double. On 29 October 2022, he started in the 2022 Copa Libertadores Final, as Flamengo defeated Athletico Paranaense 1–0 to win the tournament. Earlier that month, he was also a key figure in their 2022 Copa do Brasil triumph.

=== Wolverhampton Wanderers ===
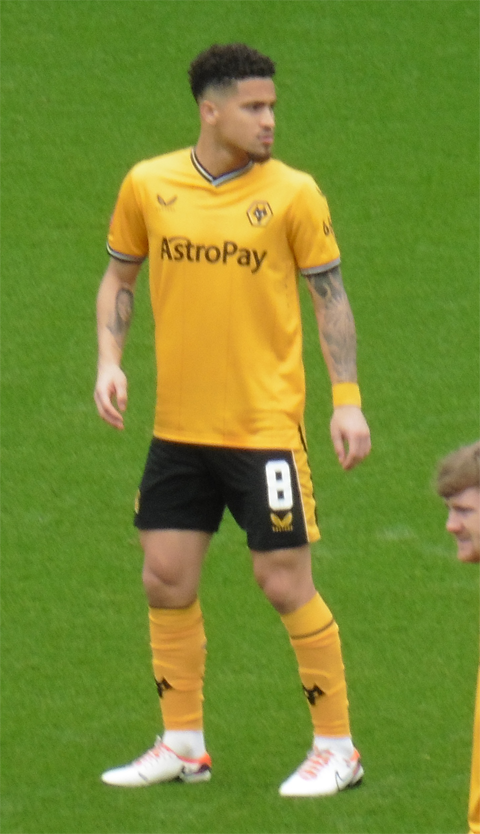
Gomes with Wolverhampton Wanderers in 2024.

On 30 January 2023, João Gomes signed for Wolverhampton Wanderers in the Premier League for €18.7 million, after a drawn out battle between Wolves and Ligue 1 club Lyon for his signature.

Gomes scored the winning goal in a 2–1 comeback victory for Wolves at Southampton in the Premier League on his debut appearance for the club (as a second-half substitute) on 11 February 2023 – this despite Wolves being reduced to ten men after a Mario Lemina red card in the first half.

Gomes was sent off after only nine minutes of his debut appearance in the FA Cup away to Brentford on 5 January 2024.

Gomes scored his second and third goals for Wolves (his first in just over a year, and first of the 2023–24 season) in the same game, giving his team a 2–1 away victory over Tottenham Hotspur in the Premier League on 17 February 2024.

Gomes's first goal of the 2024–25 season salvaged a point for Wolves in a 2–2 draw at Molineux versus Crystal Palace on 2 November 2024. Gomes then scored Wolves' second goal in a 4–1 win against Fulham as the club moved out of the relegation zone for the first time all season.

On 1 April 2025, Gomes signed a new five-year contract with Wolverhampton, with the option of a further year.

=== Aston Villa ===
On 20 July 2026, Gomes signed for Premier League club Aston Villa. It was reported the transfer fee was around €40 million (£34 million). On 12 August 2026, Gomes made his Aston Villa debut in a 2–1 defeat to Paris Saint-Germain in the UEFA Super Cup. On 23 August, Gomes made his league debut for the club in a 4–0 defeat to Brighton & Hove Albion at the Amex Stadium, where he was sent off for violent conduct after kicking out at Georginio Rutter.

== International career ==
On 23 March 2024, Gomes debuted for the Brazilian senior squad in a friendly match against England. He then played for Brazil during the 2024 Copa América and 2026 FIFA World Cup qualification (CONMEBOL).

== Style of play ==
A versatile central midfielder, João Gomes is noted for his tactical evolution and balance in both offensive and defensive phases of play. During his tenure at Flamengo, he primarily functioned as a defensive anchor or "midfield strongman," utilizing his tackling and stamina to provide balance to a heavily attacking side; his tenacious playing style subsequently earned him the nickname "The Pitbull." Following his transfer to Wolverhampton Wanderers, his role expanded into a more dynamic box-to-box profile, affording him greater freedom to advance forward due to better rotational understanding with his midfield partners.

He is highly press-resistant; he frequently utilizes a half-turn body orientation to pivot, shield the ball, and drive forward in tight spaces. Defensively, Gomes excels in positional awareness, which allows him to anticipate opposition passes, execute interceptions, and apply immediate pressure through precise tackles. In possession, he actively contributes to attacking transitions by carrying the ball into the final third and making late runs into the penalty area. Furthermore, his passing range facilitates quick counter-attacks and includes line-breaking passes to assist forwards.

== Personal life ==
Gomes speaks with a stutter. He has been a long-time practitioner of Brazilian jiu-jitsu, and was promoted to blue belt in the sport on 30 June 2023.

== Career statistics ==
=== Club ===
As of match played 8 November 2026

Appearances and goals by club, season and competition
Club	Season	League			State league (Note: Includes Campeonato Carioca)		National cup (Note: Includes Copa do Brasil, FA Cup)		League cup (Note: Includes EFL Cup)		Continental		Other		Total	
Club	Season	Division	Apps	Goals	Apps	Goals	Apps	Goals	Apps	Goals	Apps	Goals	Apps	Goals	Apps	Goals
Flamengo	2020	Série A	11	0	0	0	0	0	—		3 (Note: Appearances in Copa Libertadores)	0	0	0	14	0
Flamengo	2021	Série A	19	0	14	1	4	1	—		6	0	1 (Note: Appearance in Supercopa do Brasil)	0	44	2
Flamengo	2022	Série A	29	0	13	0	9	2	—		12	0	1	0	64	2
Flamengo	Total		59	0	27	1	13	3	—		21	0	2	0	122	4
Wolverhampton Wanderers	2022–23	Premier League	11	1	—		—		—		—		—		11	1
Wolverhampton Wanderers	2023–24	Premier League	34	2	—		3	0	1	0	—		—		38	2
Wolverhampton Wanderers	2024–25	Premier League	36	3	—		3	1	1	0	—		—		40	4
Wolverhampton Wanderers	2025–26	Premier League	35	1	—		3	0	3	0	—		—		41	1
Wolverhampton Wanderers	Total		116	7	—		9	1	5	0	—		—		130	8
Aston Villa	2026–27	Premier League	7	0	—		0	0	1	0	4 (Note: Appearances in UEFA Champions League)	0	1 (Note: Appearance in UEFA Super Cup)	0	13	0
Career total			182	7	27	1	22	4	6	0	25	0	3	0	265	12

=== International ===
As of match played 25 March 2025

Appearances and goals by national team and year
National team	Year	Apps	Goals
Brazil	2024	9	0
Brazil	2025	1	0
Total		10	0

== Honours ==
Flamengo

- Campeonato Brasileiro Série A: 2020
- Copa do Brasil: 2022
- Supercopa do Brasil: 2021
- Campeonato Carioca: 2021
- Copa Libertadores: 2022

Individual

- Campeonato Carioca Team of the Year: 2022
- Campeonato Brasileiro Série A Team of the Year: 2022
- Copa Libertadores Team of the Tournament: 2022
- Wolverhampton Wanderers Player of the Month: February 2024
- Wolverhampton Wanderers Supporters' Player of the Season: 2024–25
