= Renê (footballer, born 1992) =

Brazilian footballer

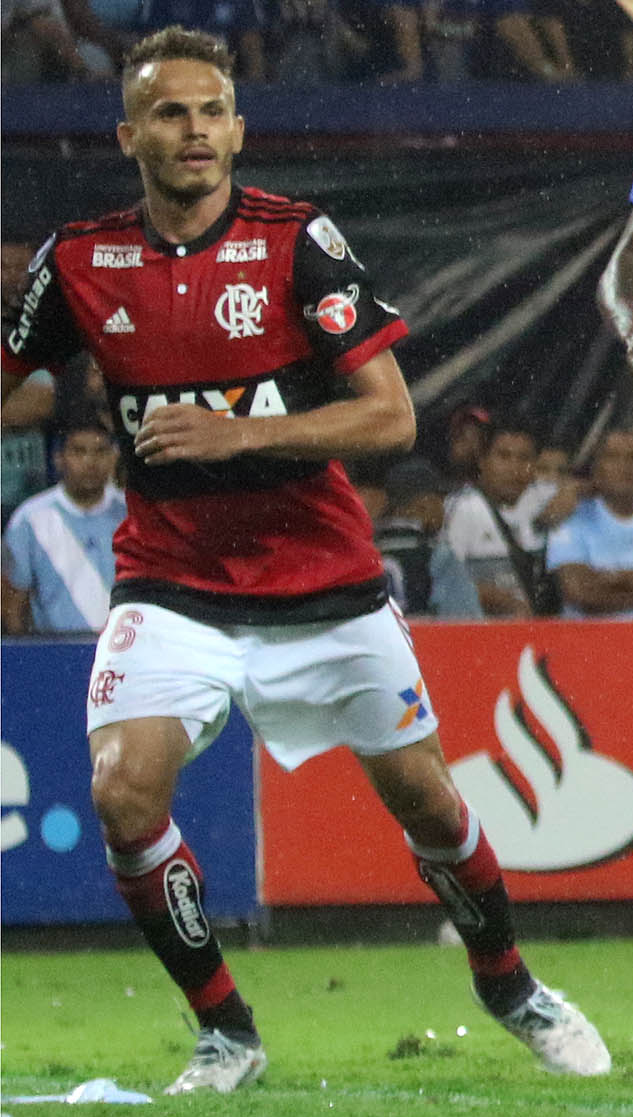
- Renê with Flamengo in 2018

Personal information
- Full name: Renê Rodrigues Martins
- Date of birth: 14 September 1992 (age 34)
- Place of birth: Picos, Brazil
- Height: 1.74 m (5 ft 9 in)
- Position: Left back

Team information
- Current team: Fluminense
- Number: 6

Youth career
- Picos
- 2011: Sport Recife

Senior career*
Years	Team	Apps	(Gls)
2012–2017	Sport Recife	161	(2)
2017–2022	Flamengo	151	(6)
2022–2024	Internacional	94	(2)
2025–	Fluminense	58	(2)
- * Club domestic league appearances and goals as of 20 September 2026

Renê Rodrigues Martins (born 14 September 1992), simply known as Renê, is a Brazilian footballer who plays as a left back for Fluminense.

== Club career ==
=== Early career ===
Born in Picos, Piauí, Renê made his senior debut with hometown club Picos in 2011. He subsequently moved to Sport, being initially assigned to the under-20 squad.

=== Sport ===
Renê made his first team debut on 15 January 2012, starting in a 1–1 Campeonato Pernambucano away draw against Araripina. He scored his first goal for the club on 5 February, netting the first in a 2–1 win at Serra Talhada.

Renê made his Série A debut on 19 May 2012, coming on as a second half substitute for Thiaguinho in a 1–1 home draw against Flamengo. He only became a regular starter during the 2014, appearing in all league matches, all as a starter; on 10 September of that year, he renewed his contract until 2017.

Renê scored his first goal in the main category on 22 August 2015, netting the first in a 1–2 loss at Figueirense.

=== Flamengo ===
On 6 February 2017, Renê signed a four-year contract with fellow top-tier club Flamengo, mainly as a replacement to Monaco-bound Jorge, for a fee of R$3.2 million for 50% of his federative rights. He made his debut for the club ten days later, starting in a 1–0 home win over América Mineiro, for the year's Primeira Liga.

After spending his first year as a backup to Miguel Trauco, Renê became the first-choice in the 2018 campaign, but lost his starting spot in 2019 after the arrival of Filipe Luís. On 28 January 2020, he renewed his contract until 2022.

== Career statistics ==
=== Club ===
As of 20 September 2026.

Club	Season	League			State League		Cup (Note: Includes Copa do Brasil)		Continental		Other		Total	
Club	Season	Division	Apps	Goals	Apps	Goals	Apps	Goals	Apps	Goals	Apps	Goals	Apps	Goals
Sport Recife	2012	Série A	13	0	15 (Note: Appearance(s) in Campeonato Pernambucano.)	1	1	0	—		—		29	1
Sport Recife	2013	Série B	1	0	2	0	0	0	—		2 (Note: Appearance(s) in Copa do Nordeste.)	0	5	0
Sport Recife	2014	Série A	38	0	11	0	1	0	2 (Note: Appearance(s) in Copa Sudamericana)	0	7	0	59	0
Sport Recife	2015	Série A	35	1	9	0	6	1	4	0	10	2	64	4
Sport Recife	2016	Série A	23	0	13	0	0	0	0	0	9	2	45	2
Sport Recife	2017	Série A	—		1	0	—		—		1	0	2	0
Sport Recife	Total		110	1	51	1	8	1	6	0	29	4	204	5
Flamengo	2017	Série A	17	0	7 (Note: Appearance(s) in Campeonato Carioca.)	1	3	0	5 (Note: Three appearances in Copa Libertadores and two appearances in Copa Sudamericana.)	0	2 (Note: Appearance(s) in Primeira Liga.)	0	34	1
Flamengo	2018	Série A	34	2	11	0	5	0	8 (Note: Appearance(s) in Copa Libertadores.)	0	—		58	2
Flamengo	2019	Série A	23	0	13	1	4	0	10	0	—		50	1
Flamengo	2020	Série A	12	1	6	0	4	0	4	0	1 (Note: Appearance(s) in Supercopa do Brasil.)	0	27	1
Flamengo	2021	Série A	19	1	6	0	3	0	4	0	0	0	32	1
Flamengo	2022	Série A	—		3	0	—		—		—		3	0
Flamengo	Total		105	4	46	2	19	0	31	0	3	0	204	6
Internacional	2022	Série A	28	0	—		—		7	0	—		35	0
Internacional	2023	Série A	28	1	11 (Note: Appearances in Campeonato Gaucho)	0	3	0	10	0	—		52	1
Internacional	2024	Série A	15	0	12	1	2	0	7	0	—		36	1
Internacional	Total		71	1	23	1	5	0	24	0	—		123	2
Fluminense	2025	Série A	28	2	4	0	6	0	6	0	4 (Note: Appearances in FIFA Club World Cup)	0	48	2
Fluminense	2026	Série A	20	0	6	0	1	0	6	0	—		33	0
Fluminense	Total		48	2	10	0	7	0	12	0	4	0	81	2
Career total			326	8	130	4	39	1	73	0	36	4	590	15

== Honours ==
=== Club ===
Sport

- Copa do Nordeste: 2014
- Campeonato Pernambucano: 2014

Flamengo

- Copa Libertadores: 2019
- Recopa Sudamericana: 2020
- Campeonato Brasileiro Série A: 2019, 2020
- Supercopa do Brasil: 2020, 2021
- Campeonato Carioca: 2017, 2019, 2020, 2021

=== Individual ===
- Bola de Prata: 2018
- Campeonato Brasileiro Série A Team of the Year: 2018
- Campeonato Carioca Team of the Year: 2019
