= 2021 Supercopa do Brasil =

4th Supercopa do Brasil, annual football match

Flamengo	Palmeiras
(Rio de Janeiro (state))	(São Paulo (state))
2	2
- Flamengo won 6–5 on penalties
- Date: 11 April 2021
- Venue: Estádio Nacional Mané Garrincha, Brasília
- Man of the Match: Giorgian De Arrascaeta (Flamengo)
- Referee: Leandro Vuaden (Rio Grande do Sul)
- Attendance: 0

The 2021 Supercopa do Brasil (officially the Supercopa Kia 2021 for sponsorship reasons) was the fourth edition of Supercopa do Brasil, an annual football match played between the champions of the Campeonato Brasileiro Série A and Copa do Brasil.

The match was played at the Estádio Nacional Mané Garrincha in Brasília on 11 April 2021. Flamengo and Palmeiras qualified after winning the 2020 Campeonato Brasileiro Série A and the 2020 Copa do Brasil, respectively.

The match finished in a 2–2 draw, but Flamengo clinched their second title by winning 6–5 on penalties.

== Qualified teams ==
Team	Qualification	Previous appearances (bold indicates winners)
(Rio de Janeiro (state)) Flamengo	2020 Campeonato Brasileiro Série A champions	2 (1991, **2020**)
(São Paulo (state)) Palmeiras	2020 Copa do Brasil champions	None

== Match ==
=== Details ===
11 April 2021
11:00 UTC–3

Flamengo (Rio de Janeiro (state))	2–2	(São Paulo (state)) Palmeiras
Gabriel 22'; De Arrascaeta 45+3'	Report	Raphael Veiga 1', 74' (pen.)
Penalties
De Arrascaeta (penalty scored); Filipe Luís (penalty missed); Matheuzinho (penalty missed); Vitinho (penalty scored); Gabriel (penalty scored); João Gomes (penalty scored); Pepê (penalty missed); Michael (penalty scored); Rodrigo Caio (penalty scored)	6–5	(penalty scored) Raphael Veiga; (penalty scored) Gómez; (penalty scored) Gustavo Scarpa; (penalty missed) Luan; (penalty missed) Danilo; (penalty scored) Viña; (penalty missed) Gabriel Menino; (penalty scored) Gabriel Veron; (penalty missed) Mayke

Estádio Nacional Mané Garrincha, Brasília
Attendance: 0
Referee: Leandro Vuaden (Rio Grande do Sul)

**Flamengo**	**Palmeiras**

GK	1	(Brazil) Diego Alves
DF	44	(Chile) Mauricio Isla	(yellow card) 41'	(substituted off) 62'
DF	5	(Brazil) Willian Arão	(yellow card) 76'
DF	3	(Brazil) Rodrigo Caio	(yellow card) 71'
DF	16	(Brazil) Filipe Luís
MF	10	(Brazil) Diego (c)		(substituted off) 62'
MF	8	(Brazil) Gerson		(substituted off) 87'
MF	7	(Brazil) Éverton Ribeiro		(substituted off) 78'
MF	14	(Uruguay) Giorgian De Arrascaeta
FW	27	(Brazil) Bruno Henrique		(substituted off) 87'
FW	9	(Brazil) Gabriel
Substitutes:
GK	45	(Brazil) Hugo Souza
DF	2	(Brazil) Gustavo Henrique
DF	4	(Brazil) Léo Pereira
DF	6	(Brazil) Renê
DF	30	(Brazil) Bruno Viana
DF	34	(Brazil) Matheuzinho		(substituted in) 62'
MF	17	(Brazil) Hugo Moura
MF	35	(Brazil) João Gomes		(substituted in) 62'
MF	40	(Brazil) Pepê		(substituted in) 87'
FW	11	(Brazil) Vitinho		(substituted in) 78'
FW	19	(Brazil) Michael		(substituted in) 87'
FW	43	(Brazil) Rodrigo Muniz
Manager:
(Brazil) Rogério Ceni				(yellow card) 90+3'

GK	21	(Brazil) Weverton
DF	2	(Brazil) Marcos Rocha		(substituted off) 59'
DF	13	(Brazil) Luan	(yellow card) 53'
DF	15	(Paraguay) Gustavo Gómez
DF	17	(Uruguay) Matías Viña
MF	30	(Brazil) Felipe Melo (c)	(yellow card) 9'	(substituted off) 46'
MF	8	(Brazil) Zé Rafael		(substituted off) 46'
MF	23	(Brazil) Raphael Veiga
FW	19	(Brazil) Breno Lopes
FW	7	(Brazil) Rony		(substituted off) 90'
FW	11	(Brazil) Wesley	(yellow card) 11'	(substituted off) 59'
Substitutes:
GK	42	(Brazil) Jailson
DF	6	(Brazil) Lucas Esteves
DF	12	(Brazil) Mayke	(yellow card) 79'	(substituted in) 59'
DF	26	(Brazil) Victor Luis
DF	33	(Brazil) Alan Empereur
MF	5	(Brazil) Patrick de Paula
MF	14	(Brazil) Gustavo Scarpa		(substituted in) 90'
MF	25	(Brazil) Gabriel Menino		(substituted in) 46'
MF	28	(Brazil) Danilo		(substituted in) 46'
FW	27	(Brazil) Gabriel Veron		(substituted in) 59'
FW	29	(Brazil) Willian
FW	37	(Brazil) Rafael Papagaio
Manager:
(Portugal) Abel Ferreira			(yellow card) 36' (red card) 38'

Man of the Match:
(Uruguay) Giorgian De Arrascaeta (Flamengo)
Assistant referees:
Rafael da Silva Alves (Rio Grande do Sul)
Jorge Eduardo Bernardi (Rio Grande do Sul)
Fourth official:
Sávio Sampaio (Federal District)
Video assistant referee:
Wagner Reway (Paraíba)
Assistant video assistant referees:
Daniel Nobre Bins (Rio Grande do Sul)
José Eduardo Calza (Rio Grande do Sul)

**Match rules**

- 90 minutes.
- Penalty shoot-out if scores still level.
- Twelve named substitutes.
- Maximum of five substitutions.

2021 Supercopa do Brasil winners
**Flamengo**
**2nd title**
