= Pepê (footballer, born 1998) =

Brazilian association football player

Personal information
- Full name: João Pedro Vilardi Pinto
- Date of birth: 6 January 1998 (age 28)
- Place of birth: Rio de Janeiro, Brazil
- Height: 1.83 m (6 ft 0 in)
- Position: Midfielder

Team information
- Current team: Cuiabá (on loan from Vitória)
- Number: 8

Youth career
- 2008–2018: Flamengo

Senior career*
Years	Team	Apps	(Gls)
2018–2021	Flamengo	24	(2)
2018	→ Portimonense (loan)	1	(0)
2021–2022	Cuiabá	64	(4)
2023–2025	Grêmio	72	(3)
2025–	Vitória	14	(0)
2026–	→ Cuiabá (loan)	21	(1)
- * Club domestic league appearances and goals as of 18 November 2026

João Pedro Vilardi Pinto (born 6 January 1998), better known as Pepê, is a Brazilian professional footballer who plays as a midfielder for Campeonato Brasileiro Série B club Cuiabá, on loan from Vitória.

== Career ==
=== Youth ===
Pepê joined the youth academy of Flamengo at the age of 10.

=== Flamengo ===
He made his senior debut with Flamengo in a 2–0 2018 Campeonato Carioca win against Volta Redonda on 17 January 2018, and scored in his debut.

Pepê scored his first Campeonato Brasileiro Série A goal with a 83rd-minute strike in a 2–0 Flamengo win against Palmeiras on 21 January 2021.

==== Portimonense (loan) ====
On 14 August 2018, he joined Portimonense on loan for the 2018–19 season. He made his professional debut with Portimonense in a 1–1 Primeira Liga tie with Belenenses on 3 November 2018.

=== Cuiabá ===
On 22 April 2021 Flamengo announced Pepê transfer to Cuiabá two months before the end of his contract, in exchange his former club retains 20% of his economic rights. Pepê signed a three-year contract with Cuiabá.

== Career statistics ==
As of 28 October 2021.

Club	Season	League			State League		Cup		Continental		Other		Total	
Club	Season	Division	Apps	Goals	Apps	Goals	Apps	Goals	Apps	Goals	Apps	Goals	Apps	Goals
Flamengo	2018	Série A	0	0	3 (Note: Appearance(s) in Campeonato Carioca.)	1	0	0	0	0	—		3	1
Flamengo	2019	Série A	0	0	—		0	0	—		—		0	0
Flamengo	2020	Série A	11	1	4	0	1	0	0	0	—		16	1
Flamengo	2021	Série A	0	0	6	0	0	0	0	0	1 (Note: Appearance(s) in Supercopa do Brasil.)	0	7	0
Flamengo	Total		11	1	13	1	1	0	0	0	1	0	26	2
Portimonense (loan)	2018–19	Primeira Liga	1	0	—		0	0	—		—		1	0
Cuiabá	2021	Série A	24	2	—		0	0	—		—		24	2
Career total			36	3	14	1	1	0	0	0	1	0	52	4

== Honours ==
Flamengo

- Copa Libertadores: 2019
- Campeonato Brasileiro Série A: 2020
- Supercopa do Brasil: 2021
- Campeonato Carioca: 2020, 2021

Cuiabá

- Campeonato Mato-Grossense: 2022

Grêmio

- Campeonato Gaúcho: 2023, 2024
- Recopa Gaúcha: 2023

== Personal life ==
Pepê is a devout Christian, being a member of the Igreja Presbiteriana das Américas congregation in Barra da Tijuca.
