= Paulo Victor (footballer, born 1998) =

Brazilian footballer

Personal information
- Full name: Paulo Victor Dias de Andrade
- Date of birth: 13 October 1998 (age 28)
- Place of birth: Barra do Piraí, Brazil
- Position: Midfielder

Team information
- Current team: Resende

Youth career
- –2015: Volta Redonda
- 2016–2018: Resende
- 2017–2018: → Grêmio (loan)

Senior career*
Years	Team	Apps	(Gls)
2017–	Resende	0	(0)
- * Club domestic league appearances and goals as of 14:42, 17 July 2019 (UTC)

Paulo Victor Dias de Andrade (born 13 October 1998), commonly known as Paulo Victor, is a Brazilian footballer who currently plays as a midfielder for Resende.

== Career statistics ==
=== Club ===
As of 17 July 2019.

Club	Season	League			State League		Cup		Continental		Other		Total	
Club	Season	Division	Apps	Goals	Apps	Goals	Apps	Goals	Apps	Goals	Apps	Goals	Apps	Goals
Resende	2017	–			1 (Note: Appearances in the Campeonato Carioca)	0	0	0	–		0	0	1	0
Resende	2018	–			0	0	0	0	–		0	0	0	0
Resende	2019	–			0	0	0	0	–		0	0	0	0
Career total			0	0	1	0	0	0	0	0	0	0	1	0
