= Leandro Vuaden =

Brazilian football referee

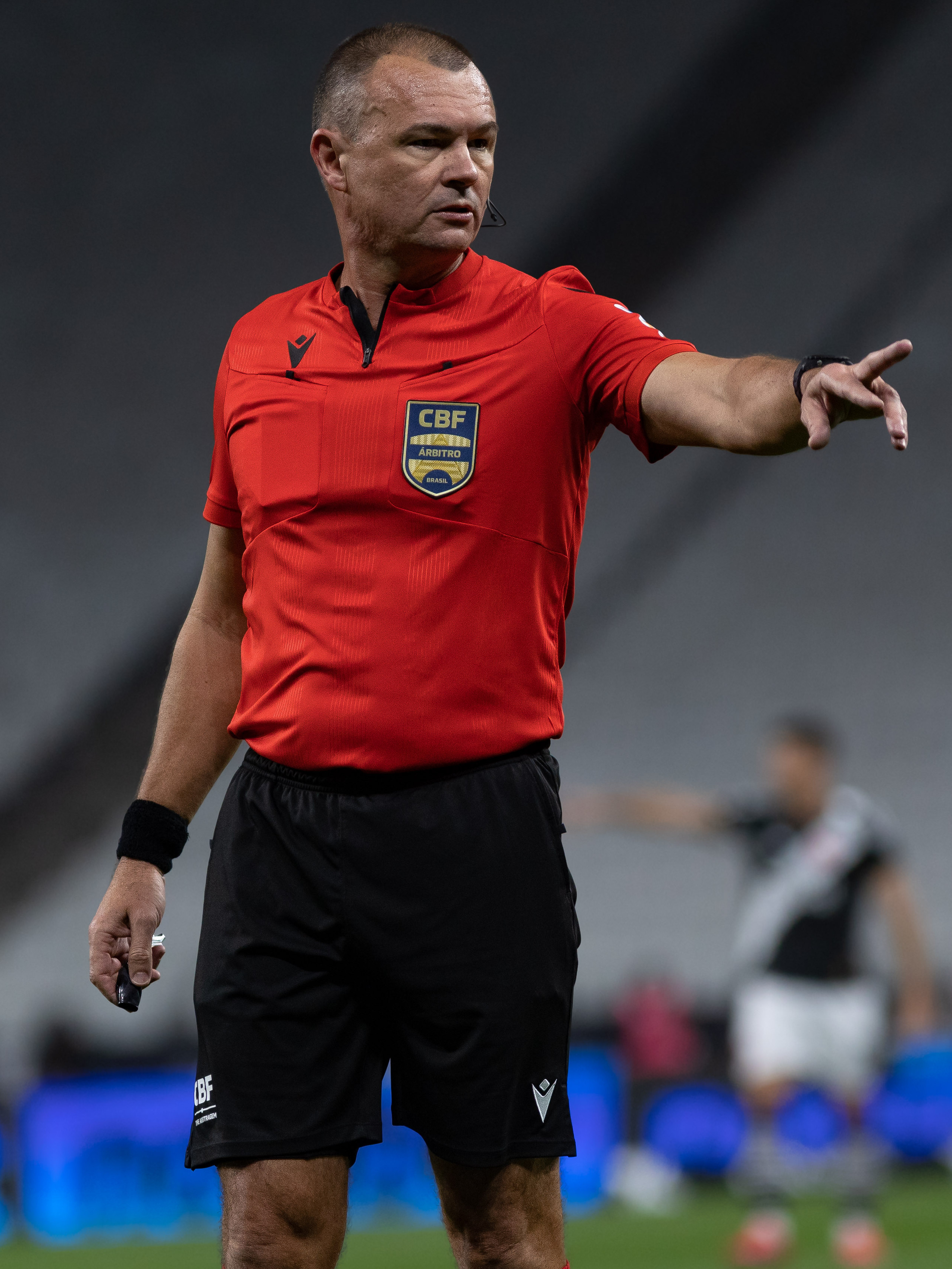
- Full name: Leandro Pedro Vuaden
- Born: 29 June 1975 (age 51); Roca Sales, Brazil

Domestic
Years	League	Role
1996–2023	FGF	
2007–2023	CBF	
2009–2023	CONMEBOL; FIFA	Referee

Leandro Pedro Vuaden (born 29 June 1975), is a Brazilian former football referee.

== Career ==
Born in Rio Grande do Sul, Vuaden became a professional referee in 1996. As a style more similar to European football, scoring few fouls, he quickly rose to prominence. On 15 occasions, he refereed the Campeonato Gaúcho final match and in 2007, he joined the CBF staff. He was elected the best referee of the Campeonato Brasileiro Série A in 2011 and 2020 seasons.

Vuaden refereed his last professional match in the last round of the 2023 Campeonato Brasileiro Série A, in the match Santos vs. Fortaleza that led to the first relegation of the club on the coast of São Paulo. For 2024, Vuaden took up a position on the arbitration committee.
