= 2020 Supercopa do Brasil =

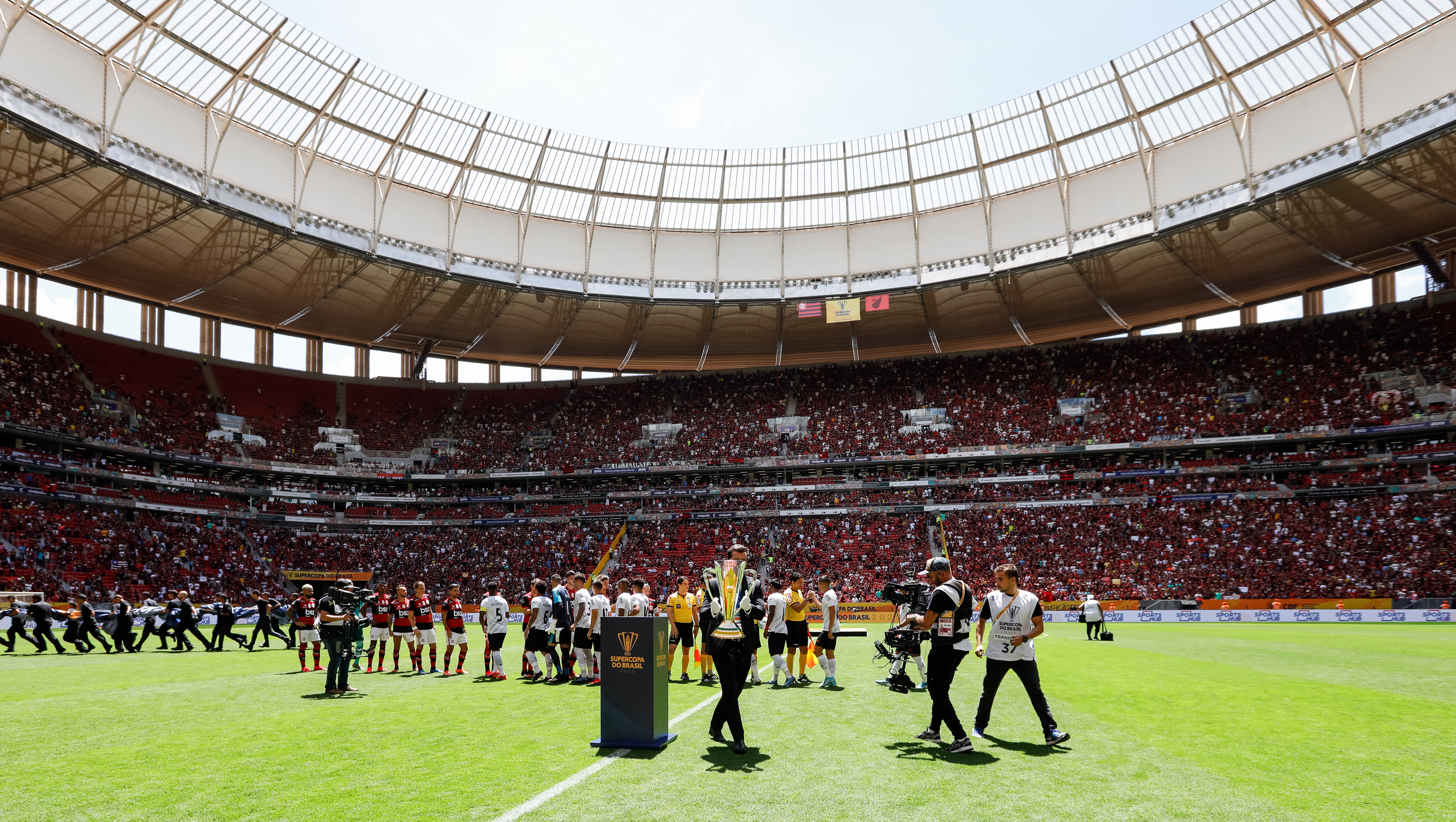
Flamengo	Athletico Paranaense
(Rio de Janeiro (state))	(Paraná (state))
3	0
- Date: 16 February 2020
- Venue: Estádio Nacional Mané Garrincha, Brasília
- Referee: Wilton Sampaio (Goiás)
- Attendance: 48,009

The 2020 Supercopa do Brasil was the 3rd Supercopa do Brasil, an annual football match played between the champions of the 2019 Campeonato Brasileiro Série A and 2019 Copa do Brasil. The 2020 edition marked the return of the tournament, which since 1991 was not disputed.

The match was played at the Estádio Nacional Mané Garrincha in Brasília on 16 February 2020. Flamengo and Athletico Paranaense qualified after winning the 2019 Campeonato Brasileiro Série A tournament and the 2019 Copa do Brasil, respectively.

Flamengo won the match 3–0, securing their first tournament title.

== Qualified teams ==
Team	Qualification	Previous appearances (bold indicates winners)
(Rio de Janeiro (state)) Flamengo	2019 Campeonato Brasileiro Série A champions	1 (1991)
(Paraná (state)) Athletico Paranaense	2019 Copa do Brasil champions	None

== Match ==
=== Details ===
16 February 2020
11:00 UTC–3

Flamengo (Rio de Janeiro (state))	3–0	(Paraná (state)) Athletico Paranaense
Bruno Henrique 14'; Gabriel 29'; De Arrascaeta 68'	Report

Estádio Nacional Mané Garrincha, Brasília
Attendance: 48,009
Referee: Wilton Sampaio (Goiás)

**Flamengo**	**Athletico Paranaense**

GK	1	(Brazil) Diego Alves
DF	13	(Brazil) Rafinha
DF	3	(Brazil) Rodrigo Caio
DF	2	(Brazil) Gustavo Henrique
DF	16	(Brazil) Filipe Luís	(substituted off) 87'
MF	5	(Brazil) Willian Arão
MF	8	(Brazil) Gerson
MF	7	(Brazil) Éverton Ribeiro (c)	(substituted off) 86'
MF	14	(Uruguay) Giorgian De Arrascaeta	(substituted off) 72'
FW	27	(Brazil) Bruno Henrique
FW	9	(Brazil) Gabriel
Substitutes:
GK	37	(Brazil) César
DF	6	(Brazil) Renê	(substituted in) 87'
DF	26	(Brazil) Matheus Thuler
DF	30	(Brazil) João Lucas
DF	55	(Brazil) Matheus Dantas
MF	10	(Brazil) Diego	(substituted in) 86'
MF	11	(Brazil) Vitinho
MF	33	(Brazil) Thiago Maia
FW	19	(Brazil) Michael	(substituted in) 72'
FW	21	(Brazil) Pedro
FW	29	(Brazil) Lincoln
FW	32	(Brazil) Pedro Rocha
Manager:
(Portugal) Jorge Jesus

GK	1	(Brazil) Aderbar Santos
DF	13	(Brazil) Khellven		(substituted off) 46'
DF	33	(Brazil) Lucas Halter
DF	44	(Brazil) Thiago Heleno
DF	6	(Brazil) Márcio Azevedo		(substituted off) 46'
MF	26	(Brazil) Erick	(yellow card) 52'
MF	5	(Brazil) Wellington (c)
MF	18	(Brazil) Léo Cittadini		(substituted off) 63'
FW	11	(Brazil) Nikão	(yellow card) 62'
FW	10	(Brazil) Marquinhos Gabriel
FW	7	(Brazil) Rony
Substitutes:
GK	22	(Brazil) Léo
GK	99	(Brazil) Bento
DF	14	(Brazil) Robson Bambu
DF	16	(Brazil) Abner Vinícius		(substituted in) 46'
DF	21	(Brazil) Adriano
DF	27	(Brazil) Zé Ivaldo
MF	3	(Argentina) Lucho González
MF	55	(Brazil) Fernando Canesin		(substituted in) 46'
MF	88	(Brazil) Christian
FW	17	(Brazil) Guilherme Bissoli		(substituted in) 63'
FW	28	(Brazil) Vitinho
FW	96	(Brazil) Carlos Eduardo
Manager:
(Brazil) Dorival Júnior

Assistant referees:
Fabrício Vilarinho da Silva (Goiás)
Bruno Raphael Pires (Goiás)
Fourth official:
Sávio Sampaio (Federal District)
Video assistant referee:
Rodrigo Guarizo Ferreira do Amaral (São Paulo)
Assistant video assistant referees:
Márcio Henrique de Gois (São Paulo)
Leone Carvalho Rocha (Goiás)

**Match rules**

- 90 minutes.
- Penalty shoot-out if scores still level.
- Twelve named substitutes.
- Maximum of three substitutions.

2020 Supercopa do Brasil winners
**Flamengo**
**1st title**
