= Sávio Pereira Sampaio =

Brazilian football referee

- Full name: Sávio Pereira Sampaio
- Born: 10 June 1985 (age 41); Brasília, Brazil

Domestic
Years	League	Role
2012–2016	FFDF	
2016–	FGF, CBF	
2022–	CONMEBOL; FIFA	Referee

Sávio Pereira Sampaio (born 10 June 1985) is a Brazilian football referee.

== Referee career ==
Born in Brasília, Sávio Pereira Sampaio began his career as a referee in 2010, becoming an official at the Brasiliense Football Federation in 2012. In 2016, he managed to join the CBF and transferred to the Goiás federation. In 2022 he performed his first international arbitration in the Copa Sudamericana, in the match Metropolitanos vs. Montevideo Wanderers. In 2023 he was one of the nominees for the 2023 South American U-17 Championship.

== Personal life ==
Sávio is the younger brother of Wilton Pereira Sampaio, also a referee, with whom he has worked with as a fourth referee or VAR assistant on several occasions.
