= 2026 CR Flamengo season =

Flamengo
2026 season
- President: Luiz Eduardo Baptista
- Head coach: Filipe Luís (until 3 March 2026); Leonardo Jardim (from 4 March 2026)
- Stadium: Maracanã
- Série A: 1st
- Campeonato Carioca: Winners
- Copa do Brasil: Fifth round
- Copa Libertadores: Semi-finals
- Supercopa do Brasil: Runners-up
- Recopa Sudamericana: Runners-up
- Top goalscorer: League: Pedro (20 goals); All: Pedro (29 goals)
- Highest home attendance: 72,492 (22 October 2026 vs Estudiantes de La Plata, Copa Libertadores)
- Lowest home attendance: 5,755 (11 January 2026 vs Portuguesa (RJ), Campeonato Carioca)
Home colours	Away colours	Third colours

The 2026 season is Clube de Regatas do Flamengo's 131st year of existence, their 115th football season, and their 56th in the Campeonato Brasileiro Série A, having never been relegated from the top division. In addition to the 2026 Campeonato Brasileiro Série A, Flamengo also compete in the 2026 Supercopa do Brasil, 2026 Recopa Sudamericana, 2026 CONMEBOL Copa Libertadores, 2026 Copa do Brasil, and the 2026 Campeonato Carioca, the top tier of Rio de Janeiro's state football.

== Kits ==
Supplier: Adidas
Sponsors: Betano (Main sponsor) / Ademicon (Lower shirt) / Hapvida (Back of the shirt) / Assist Card (Lower back) / Banco BRB (Shoulder) / Shopee (Sleeves) / Texaco (Numbers) / GAC Group (Shorts) / WAP (Shorts) / Zé Delivery (Shorts)

2026 season Outfield Kits
Home	Home alt.^{1}	Home alt.^{2}	Home alt.^{3}	Home alt.^{4}	Away	Away alt.^{1}	Away alt.^{2}	Third

2026 season Goalkeeper Kits
Goalkeeper	Goalkeeper	Goalkeeper	Goalkeeper	Goalkeeper

2025 season Outfield Kits
Home	Away	Away alt.^{1}	Third

2025 season Goalkeeper Kits
Goalkeeper^{1}	Goalkeeper^{2}	Goalkeeper^{3}	Goalkeeper^{4}

=== Kit information ===
This is Adidas's 13th year supplying Flamengo kit during its second stint with the team, having taken over from Olympikus at the beginning of the 2013 season. The deal was renewed for another 5 seasons on 29 April 2024.

- Home: The club revealed their new home kit for the 2026 season on 16 January. The kit maintain Flamengo's traditional colours of red and black and references the club's kits used in the 1980s, also produced by Adidas during its first stint. The shirt has a polo collar without buttons and its body is predominantly black (just like the previous two seasons) and contains three large black stripes and two large red stripes. It's complemented by white shorts and red socks with a large black stripe.
- "Away": On 10 April, Flamengo released their second kit and retires the term "Away", referring to the kit as "Manto 1 Branco" ("White Home kit" in context). The shirt has a white body with two horizontal stripes (red on the top stripe and black on the bottom stripe) centered at chest level, which were last used in 2019. It's complemented by black shorts and white socks
- GK: The new goalkeeper kits are based on Adidas' goalkeeper template for the 2026–27 season.

=== Kit usage ===
As of 19 March 2026

Kit	Combination	Usage
Kits from the 2026 season
Home	Black and red-striped shirt, white shorts and red and black socks.	Campeonato Brasileiro: used at home against Internacional, Cruzeiro and Remo.; Supercopa do Brasil: used against Corinthians.; Campeonato Carioca: used at home against Vasco da Gama Sampaio Corrêa and Madureira; used away against Botafogo.; Recopa Sudamericana: used at home against Lanús.
Home alt.^{1}	Black and red-striped shirt, black shorts (2025 season) and red and black socks.	Campeonato Brasileiro: used away against São Paulo.; Campeonato Carioca: used away against Fluminense; used in the final against Fluminense.
Away	White shirt with a horizontal red and black stripe, black shorts and white socks.	
Goalkeeper	Grey shirt, grey shorts and grey socks.	Campeonato Carioca: used at home against Sampaio Corrêa; used in the final against Fluminense.
Kits from the 2025 season
Home	Black and red-striped shirt, white shorts and black and red socks.	Campeonato Carioca: used at home against Portuguesa; used away against Bangu.
Away	Withe shirt with red and black sleeves, black shorts and white socks.	
Away alt.^{1}	Withe shirt with red and black sleeves, white shorts (2026 season) and white socks.	Campeonato Brasileiro: used away against Vitória and Botafogo.; Campeonato Carioca: used away against Madureira.; Recopa Sudamericana: used away against Lanús.
Third	Off-white shirt, off-white shorts and off-white socks; all details in gold, black and red	Campeonato Carioca: used away against Volta Redonda.
Goalkeeper^{1}	Blue shirt, blue shorts and blue socks.	Campeonato Brasileiro: used at home against Internacional; used away against Vitória.; Campeonato Carioca: used at home against Portuguesa; used away against Fluminense.; Recopa Sudamericana: used against Lanús (twice).
Goalkeeper^{2}	Pink shirt, pink shorts and pink socks.	Campeonato Brasileiro: used at home against Cruzeiro; used away against São Paulo, Botafogo and Remo.; Supercopa do Brasil: used against Corinthians.; Campeonato Carioca: used at home against Vasco da Gama; used away against Bangu.
Goalkeeper^{3}	Lime shirt, lime shorts and lime socks.	
Goalkeeper^{4}	Red shirt, red shorts and red socks.	Campeonato Carioca: used at home against Madureira; used away against Volta Redonda, Botafogo and Madureira.

== Competitions ==
=== Overview ===
Competition	First match	Last match	Starting round	Final position	Record							
Competition	First match	Last match	Starting round	Final position	Pld	W	D	L	GF	GA	GD	Win %
Série A	28 January 2026	2 December 2026	Matchday 1	Winner	36	24	8	4	74	31	+43	66.67
Copa do Brasil	22 April 2026	14 May 2026	Fifth round	Fifth round	2	1	0	1	2	3	−1	50.00
Campeonato Carioca	11 January 2026	8 March 2026	Group stage	Winners	10	5	2	3	24	10	+14	50.00
Copa Libertadores	8 April 2026	22 October 2026	Group stage	Semi-finals	12	7	5	0	20	5	+15	58.33
Supercopa do Brasil	1 February 2026		Final	Runners-up	1	0	0	1	0	2	−2	0.00
Recopa Sudamericana	19 February 2026	26 February 2026	Final	Runners-up	2	0	0	2	2	4	−2	0.00
Total					63	37	15	11	122	55	+67	58.73

Last updated: 4 November 2026
Source: Competitions

=== Friendlies ===
Win Draw Loss

Goals, assists and red cards are shown.

3 July 2026 Friendly	Flamengo (Brazil)	2–2	(Argentina) River Plate	Faro/Loulé, Portugal
15:30 UTC−3	Lino; Bruno Henrique 33' (Lino)	Report	Driussi 9', 38' (González)	Stadium: Estádio Algarve; Referee: Luís Godinho

8 July 2026 Friendly	FC Lausanne-Sport (Switzerland)	0–2	(Brazil) Flamengo	Faro/Loulé, Portugal
16:30 UTC−3		Report	Lorran 51' (Wallace Yan); Wallace Yan 71'	Stadium: Estádio Algarve

11 July 2026 Algarve Cup	Benfica (Portugal)	1–2	(Brazil) Flamengo	Faro/Loulé, Portugal
15:30 UTC−3	Pavlidis 45+8' (pen.)	Report	Lino 45+5' (Royal); Wallace Yan 68' (Lino)	Stadium: Estádio Algarve; Referee: Fábio Veríssimo

17 July 2026 Friendly	Flamengo (Brazil)	4–2	(Paraguay) Olimpia	Brasília, Brasil
20:00 UTC−3	Pedro 29' (Lino); Lorran 32' (Lino); Bruno Henrique 45+1' (Lorran); L. Araújo 60' (Lino)	Report	Delmas 6'; Cardozo 55'	Stadium: Mané Garrincha; Attendance: 52,638

=== Supercopa do Brasil ===
Flamengo qualified for the 2026 Supercopa do Brasil by winning the Série A.

Goals, assists and red cards are shown.

1 February 2026 Final Encontro das Nações	Flamengo	0–2	Corinthians	Brasília
16:00 UTC−3	Carrascal (red card) 46'	Report	Gabriel Paulista; Yuri Alberto 90+7' (Kaio César)	Stadium: Arena BRB Mané Garrincha; Attendance: 71,244; Referee: Rafael Rodrigo Klein

=== Recopa Sudamericana ===
Flamengo qualified for the 2026 Recopa Sudamericana by winning the 2025 Copa Libertadores.

Goals, assists and red cards are shown.

19 February 2026 Final (1st leg)	Lanús (Argentina)	1–0	(Brazil) Flamengo	Lanús, Argentina
21:30 UTC−3	Castillo 77' (Marcich)	Report		Stadium: Ciudad de Lanús; Referee: Alexis Herrera (Venezuela)

26 February 2026 Final (2nd leg)	Flamengo (Brazil)	2–3 (2–4 agg.)	(Argentina) Lanús	Rio de Janeiro, Brazil
21:30 UTC−3	de Arrascaeta 37' (pen.); Jorginho 85' (pen.)	Report	Castillo 29'; Canale 118' (Sepúlveda); Aquino 120+2'	Stadium: Maracanã; Attendance: 64,470; Referee: Gustavo Tejera (Uruguay)

=== Campeonato Carioca ===
==== Group B ====
Pos	Team	Pld	W	D	L	GF	GA	GD	Pts	Qualification or relegation
1	Botafogo	6	3	0	3	6	5	+1	9	Qualified for the Quarter-final
2	Madureira	6	2	2	2	5	6	−1	8	Qualified for the Quarter-final
3	Boavista	6	2	2	2	6	8	−2	8	Qualified for the Quarter-final
4	Flamengo	6	2	1	3	11	9	+2	7	Qualified for the Quarter-final
5	Nova Iguaçu	6	1	2	3	8	9	−1	5	Relegation stage
6	Maricá	6	1	0	5	5	10	−5	3	Relegation stage

Source: FERJ

==== Matches ====
Goals, assists and red cards are shown.

11 January 2026 5	Flamengo	1–1	Portuguesa	Volta Redonda
18:00 UTC−3	Iago 90+5' (Wallace Yan)	Report	Rhuan 58'	Stadium: Raulino de Oliveira; Attendance: 5,755; Referee: Pierry Dias dos Santos

14 January 2026 1	Bangu	2–1	Flamengo	Bangu
21:30 UTC−3	Patrick 4' (Garrinsha); Garrinsha	Report	Gomes 19' (Sales)	Stadium: Moça Bonita; Attendance: 7,000; Referee: Jodis Nascimento de Souza

17 January 2026 2	Volta Redonda	3–0	Flamengo	Volta Redonda
21:30 UTC−3	MV 17' (Catatau); Rafael Augusto 51' (Wagninho); Dener 82' (Wagninho)	Report	Carbone (yellow card) 3' (yellow-red card) 11'	Stadium: Raulino de Oliveira; Attendance: 4,587; Referee: Yuri Elino Ferreira da Cruz

21 January 2026 3 Clássico dos Milhões	Flamengo	1–0	Vasco da Gama	Rio de Janeiro
21:30 UTC−3	Carrascal 69'	Report	Barros (red card) 51'	Stadium: Maracanã; Attendance: 50,504; Referee: Bruno Arleu de Araújo

25 January 2026 4 Fla–Flu	Fluminense	2–1	Flamengo	Rio de Janeiro
18:00 UTC−3	Serna 52' (Moreno); John Kennedy 66'	Report	Everton	Stadium: Maracanã; Attendance: 46,525; Referee: Alex Gomes Stefano

7 February 2026 6	Flamengo	7–1	Sampaio Corrêa	Rio de Janeiro
21:00 UTC−3	Pedro 16' (Carrascal), 31' (Lino); Bruno Henrique 58' (Lino), 90+2'; Lino 67' (Royal); Everton 70' (Royal); Telles	Report	Andrade	Stadium: Maracanã; Attendance: 24,967; Referee: Alex Gomes Stefano

==== Quarter-final ====
15 February 2026 Single match Clássico da Rivalidade	Botafogo	1–2	Flamengo	Rio de Janeiro
17:30 UTC−3	Barboza 54' (Telles)	Report	Paquetá; Pulgar 84'	Stadium: Nilton Santos; Attendance: 10,987; Referee: Bruno Arleu de Araújo

==== Semi-finals ====
22 February 2026 First leg	Flamengo	3–0	Madureira	Rio de Janeiro
20:30 UTC−3	de la Cruz 53'; de Arrascaeta 64' (pen.); L. Araújo 86' (Lino)	Report		Stadium: Maracanã; Attendance: 22,730; Referee: Lucas Coelho Santos

2 March 2026 Second leg	Madureira	0–8 (0–11 agg.)	Flamengo	Rio de Janeiro
21:00 UTC−3	Wallace (red card) 32'	Report	Paquetá 5' (Carrascal), 23' (Carrascal); Jean Vianna 39' (o.g.); Pedro 45' (Alex Sandro), 48' (Royal), 49' (E. Araújo), 67'; Lino	Stadium: Maracanã; Attendance: 25,059; Referee: Carlos Tadeu Ferreira de Castro

==== Final ====
8 March 2026 Single match Fla–Flu	Fluminense	0–0 (4–5 p)	Flamengo	Rio de Janeiro
18:00 UTC−3		Report		Stadium: Maracanã; Attendance: 69,315; Referee: Bruno Arleu de Araújo
	Penalties
	Ganso (penalty scored); Savarino (penalty scored); Guga (penalty missed); Arana (penalty scored); John Kennedy (penalty scored); Otávio (penalty missed)		Jorginho (penalty scored); L. Araújo (penalty missed); Everton (penalty scored); Pereira (penalty scored); Paquetá (penalty scored); Ortiz (penalty scored)

=== Copa Libertadores ===
The draw for the group stage was held on 19 March 2026 on the CONMEBOL headquarters in Luque, Paraguay.

==== Group stage ====
Pos	Team	Pld	W	D	L	GF	GA	GD	Pts	Qualification	FLA	EST	DIM	CUS
1	(Brazil) Flamengo	6	5	1	0	14	2	+12	16	Advance to round of 16	—	1–0	4–1	3–0
2	(Argentina) Estudiantes	6	2	3	1	6	5	+1	9	Advance to round of 16	1–1	—	1–0	2–1
3	(Colombia) Independiente Medellín	6	2	1	3	6	11	−5	7	Transfer to Copa Sudamericana	0–3 (Note: The Independiente Medellín v Flamengo match was suspended at 0–0 in the 5th minute of play due to disturbances by Independiente Medellín fans. The match was abandoned after a one-hour wait, with CONMEBOL confirming its cancellation and referring the matter to its Disciplinary Commission, which subsequently awarded Flamengo a 3–0 win.)	1–1	—	1–0
4	(Peru) Cusco	6	0	1	5	4	12	−8	1		0–2	1–1	2–3	—

Source: CONMEBOL
Rules for classification: 1) Points; 2) Head-to-head points; 3) Head-to-head goal difference; 4) Head-to-head goals scored; 5) Goal difference; 6) Goals scored; 7) Red cards; 8) Yellow cards; 9) Drawing of lots.

==== Matches ====
Goals, assists and red cards are shown.

8 April 2026 1	Cusco (Peru)	0–2	(Brazil) Flamengo	Cusco, Peru
21:30 UTC−3		CONMEBOL; Report	Bruno Henrique 59' (Ayrton Lucas); de Arrascaeta 90+2'	Stadium: Garcilaso; Referee: Derlis López (Paraguay)

16 April 2026 2	Flamengo (Brazil)	4–1	(Colombia) Independiente Medellín	Rio de Janeiro, Brazil
21:30 UTC−3	Paquetá 15' (Ayrton Lucas); Bruno Henrique 45' (de Arrascaeta); de Arrascaeta; Pedro 90+6' (L. Araújo)	CONMEBOL; Report	González 40' (Serna)	Stadium: Maracanã; Attendance: 55,331; Referee: Andrés Matonte (Uruguay)

29 April 2026 3	Estudiantes de La Plata (Argentina)	1–1	(Brazil) Flamengo	La Plata, Argentina
21:30 UTC−3	Carrillo 55'	CONMEBOL; Report	L. Araújo	Stadium: Uno; Referee: Piero Maza (Chile)

7 May 2026 4	Independiente Medellín (Colombia)	0–3; Awarded (Note: The Independiente Medellín v Flamengo match was suspended at 0–0 in the 5th minute of play due to disturbances by Independiente Medellín fans. The match was subsequently abandoned after a one-hour wait, with CONMEBOL confirming its cancellation and referring the matter to its Disciplinary Commission, which subsequently awarded Flamengo a 3–0 win.)	(Brazil) Flamengo	Medellín, Colombia
21:30 UTC−3		Report		Stadium: Atanasio Girardot; Referee: Jesús Valenzuela (Venezuela)

20 May 2026 5	Flamengo (Brazil)	1–0	(Argentina) Estudiantes de La Plata	Rio de Janeiro, Brazil
21:30 UTC−3	Pedro 65'	CONMEBOL; Report		Stadium: Maracanã; Attendance: 53,125; Referee: Esteban Ostojich (Uruguay)

26 May 2026 6	Flamengo (Brazil)	3–0	(Peru) Cusco	Rio de Janeiro, Brazil
21:30 UTC−3	Bruno Henrique; Paquetá 90+1' (pen.)	CONMEBOL; Report		Stadium: Maracanã; Attendance: 34,796; Referee: José Burgos (Uruguay)

==== Round of 16 ====
The draw for the round of 16 was held on 29 May 2026.

Goals, assists and red cards are shown.

12 August 2026 1st leg	Cruzeiro (Brazil)	1–1	(Brazil) Flamengo	Belo Horizonte, Brazil
21:30 UTC−3	Arroyo	Report	Paquetá 67'	Stadium: Mineirão; Attendance: 60,046; Referee: Yael Falcón Pérez (Argentina)

19 August 2026 2nd leg	Flamengo (Brazil)	2–1 (3–2 agg.)	(Brazil) Cruzeiro	Rio de Janeiro, Brazil
21:30 UTC−3	de Arrascaeta; Lino	Report	Romero	Stadium: Maracanã; Attendance: 72,481; Referee: Gustavo Tejera (Uruguay)

==== Quarter-finals ====
Goals, assists and red cards are shown.

10 September 2026 1st leg	Independiente del Valle (Ecuador)	0–2	(Brazil) Flamengo	Quito, Ecuador
21:30 UTC−3		Report	Bruno Henrique 61' (Lino); Pereira 75' (Royal)	Stadium: Olímpico Atahualpa; Referee: Facundo Tello (Argentina)

17 September 2026 2nd leg	Flamengo (Brazil)	1–1 (3–1 agg.)	(Ecuador) Independiente del Valle	Rio de Janeiro, Brazil
21:30 UTC−3	Jorginho (red card) 65'; de Arrascaeta 83' (Rossi)	Report	Reasco 31'	Stadium: Maracanã; Attendance: 63,534; Referee: Andrés Matonte (Uruguay)

==== Semi-finals ====
Goals, assists and red cards are shown.

15 October 2026 1st leg	Estudiantes de La Plata (Argentina)	0–0	(Brazil) Flamengo	La Plata, Argentina
21:30 UTC−3		Report		Stadium: Uno; Referee: Juan Gabriel Benítez (Paraguay)

22 October 2026 2nd leg	Flamengo (Brazil)	0–0 (0–0 agg.) (2–3 p)	(Argentina) Estudiantes de La Plata	Rio de Janeiro, Brazil
21:30 UTC−3		Report		Stadium: Maracanã; Attendance: 72,492; Referee: Gustavo Tejera (Uruguay)
	Penalties
	de Arrascaeta (penalty scored); Jorginho (penalty missed); Paquetá (penalty missed); Pereira (penalty scored); Bruno Henrique (penalty missed)		(penalty scored) Sosa; (penalty missed) Cetré; (penalty scored) Mancuso; (penalty scored) Palacios

=== Campeonato Brasileiro ===
==== League table ====
Pos	Team	Pld	W	D	L	GF	GA	GD	Pts	Qualification or relegation
1	Flamengo (C, Q)	36	24	8	4	74	31	+43	80	Qualification for Copa Libertadores group stage
2	Palmeiras (Q)	36	21	11	4	64	26	+38	74	Qualification for Copa Libertadores group stage
3	Cruzeiro (Q)	36	20	6	10	59	50	+9	66	Qualification for Copa Libertadores group stage
4	Fluminense (T)	35	17	9	9	56	42	+14	60	Qualification for Copa Libertadores group stage
5	Athletico Paranaense (X)	35	15	9	11	52	45	+7	54	Qualification for Copa Libertadores second stage (Note: Since Palmeiras, who qualified for the Copa Libertadores group stage on league performance, reached the 2026 Copa do Brasil final, the Copa Libertadores second stage berth allocated to the 2026 Copa do Brasil runners-up was passed to the Série A's highest-placed team not already qualified.)

Updated to match(es) played on 21 November 2026. Source: CBF
Rules for classification: 1) points; 2) wins; 3) goal difference; 4) goals scored; 5) head-to-head results (only between two teams); 6) fewest red cards; 7) fewest yellow cards; 8) drawing of lots.
(C) Champions; (Q) Qualified for the phase indicated; (T) Qualified, but not yet for the particular phase indicated; (X) Assured of Copa Sudamericana, but may still qualify for Copa Libertadores

==== Results by round ====
Round	1	2	3	4	5	6	7	8	9	10	11	12	13	14	15	16	17	18	19	20	21	22	23	24	25	26	27	28	29	30	31	32	33	34	35	36	37	38
Ground	A	H	A	H (Note: Matchday 4 originally scheduled for 25 February 2026 was postponed and has been played between matchdays 25 and 26 on 2 September 2026.)	H	A	H	A	A	H	A	H	A	H	A	A	H	H	A	H	A	H	A	A	H	A	H	H	A	H	A	H	A	H	H	A	A	H
Result	L	D	W	W	W	W	W	D	L	W	W	W	W	D	W	D	L	W	W	D	D	W	W	L	W	W	W	W	D	W	W	W	W	W	W	D		
Position	15	14	10	2	6	5	4	4	6	4	2	2	2	2	2	2	2	2	2	2	2	2	2	2	2	1	1	1	1	1	1	1	1	1	1	1	1	1
Points	0	1	4	6	7	10	13	14	14	17	20	23	26	27	30	31	31	34	37	38	39	42	45	45	48	54	57	60	61	64	67	70	73	76	79	80		

Source: Matches
A = Away; H = Home; W = Win; D = Draw; L = Loss; P = Postponed; = Leader; = Copa Libertadores group stage; = Copa Libertadores second stage; = Copa Sudamericana group stage; = Relegation to Série B

==== Matches ====
Goals, assists and red cards are shown.

28 January 2026 1	São Paulo	2–1	Flamengo	São Paulo
21:30 UTC−3	Luciano; Danielzinho 71'	Report	Plata; Jorginho (red card) 90+9'	Stadium: Morumbi; Attendance: 27,203; Referee: Wilton Pereira Sampaio

4 February 2026 2	Flamengo	1–1	Internacional	Rio de Janeiro
19:00 UTC−3	de Arrascaeta 68' (pen.)	Report	Borré 45+2' (Carbonero)	Stadium: Maracanã; Attendance: 56,421; Referee: Rodrigo José Pereira de Lima

10 February 2026 3	Vitória	1–2	Flamengo	Salvador
21:30 UTC−3	Matheuzinho 52' (Baralhas); Kayzer (penalty missed) 64' (pen.)	Report	Pulgar 15' (Everton); Everton 45+4' (Ortiz)	Stadium: Barradão; Attendance: 27,080; Referee: Raphael Claus

11 March 2026 5	Flamengo	2–0	Cruzeiro	Rio de Janeiro
21:30 UTC−3	Pedro 5'; Carrascal 90+8' (Lino)	Report		Stadium: Maracanã; Attendance: 47,214; Referee: Flávio Rodrigues de Souza

14 March 2026 6 Clássico da Rivalidade	Botafogo	0–3	Flamengo	Rio de Janeiro
20:30 UTC−3	Barboza (red card) 45+9'	Report	Lino 14' (Varela); Pereira 45+2'; Pedro 50' (Varela)	Stadium: Nilton Santos; Attendance: 16,176; Referee: Anderson Daronco

19 March 2026 7	Flamengo	3–0	Remo	Rio de Janeiro
20:00 UTC−3	Ortiz 20' (de Arrascaeta); Lino 49' (L. Araújo); L. Araújo 55'	Report		Stadium: Maracanã; Attendance: 62,075; Referee: Paulo Cesar Zanovelli da Silva

22 March 2026 8 Encontro das Nações	Corinthians	1–1	Flamengo	São Paulo
20:30 UTC−3	Yuri Alberto 19' (Bidu)	Report	Paquetá; E. Araújo (red card) 52'	Stadium: Neo Química Arena; Attendance: 41,896; Referee: Rodrigo José Pereira de Lima

2 April 2026 9	Red Bull Bragantino	3–0	Flamengo	Bragança Paulista
21:30 UTC−3	Pitta 17' (Capixaba); Gabriel 39' (Mosquera); Barbosa 55' (Sant'Anna)	Report	Pulgar (red card) 50'	Stadium: Cícero de Souza Marques; Attendance: 5,854; Referee: Fernando Antônio Mendes de Salles Nascimento Filho

5 April 2026 10	Flamengo	3–1	Santos	Rio de Janeiro
17:30 UTC−3	Pedro 64' (Carrascal); Jorginho 71' (pen.); Paquetá 89' (Plata)	Report	Díaz 48' (Oliva)	Stadium: Maracanã; Attendance: 68,615; Referee: Anderson Daronco

12 April 2026 11 Fla–Flu	Fluminense	1–2	Flamengo	Rio de Janeiro
18:00 UTC−3	Savarino 76'	Report	Pedro 7' (Lino), 51' (Lino); Carrascal (red card) 90+4'	Stadium: Maracanã; Attendance: 44,833; Referee: Raphael Claus

19 April 2026 12	Flamengo	2–0	Bahia	Rio de Janeiro
19:30 UTC−3	de Arrascaeta; Paquetá	Report		Stadium: Maracanã; Attendance: 64,565; Referee: Flávio Rodrigues de Souza

26 April 2026 13 Flamengo Atlético-MG rivalry	Atlético Mineiro	0–4	Flamengo	Belo Horizonte
20:30 UTC−3		Report	Pedro 8' (Lino), 84' (E. Araújo); Plata 31' (Lino); de Arrascaeta 45+2' (Varela)	Stadium: Arena MRV; Attendance: 28,148; Referee: Rafael Rodrigo Klein

3 May 2026 14 Clássico dos Milhões	Flamengo	2–2	Vasco da Gama	Rio de Janeiro
16:00 UTC−3	Pedro 8' (Plata); Jorginho 60' (pen.)	Report	Robert Renan 84' (Moreira); Hugo Moura 90+7' (Cuesta)	Stadium: Maracanã; Attendance: 61,872; Referee: Wilton Pereira Sampaio

10 May 2026 15	Grêmio	0–1	Flamengo	Porto Alegre
19:30 UTC−3		Report	Carrascal 68' (Royal)	Stadium: Arena do Grêmio; Attendance: 30,891; Referee: Davi de Oliveira Lacerda

17 May 2026 16	Athletico Paranaense	1–1	Flamengo	Curitiba
19:30 UTC−3	Mendoza 10' (Benavídez)	Report	Pedro; Danilo (yellow card) 69' (yellow-red card) 90+1'	Stadium: Arena da Baixada; Attendance: 34,197; Referee: Rafael Rodrigo Klein

23 May 2026 17	Flamengo	0–3	Palmeiras	Rio de Janeiro
21:00 UTC−3	Carrascal (red card) 21'	Report	López; Allan 57'; Paulinho 90+4' (Jefté)	Stadium: Maracanã; Attendance: 71,205; Referee: Davi de Oliveira Lacerda

30 May 2026 18	Flamengo	3–0	Coritiba	Rio de Janeiro
16:00 UTC−3	Lino; Pedro 60' (Lino)	Report	Rocha (red card) 36'	Stadium: Maracanã; Attendance: 51,270; Referee: Flávio Rodrigues de Souza

22 July 2026 19	Chapecoense	0–4	Flamengo	Chapecó
21:30 UTC−3		Report	Pedro; Rafael Thyere 38' (o.g.); Lorran 48'	Stadium: Arena Condá; Attendance: 13,769; Referee: Rafael Rodrigo Klein

26 July 2026 20	Flamengo	1–1	São Paulo	Rio de Janeiro
18:30 UTC−3	Pereira	Report	Calleri 70' (Osorio)	Stadium: Maracanã; Attendance: 70,791; Referee: Anderson Daronco

29 July 2026 21	Internacional	1–1	Flamengo	Porto Alegre
19:30 UTC−3	Vitinho 27'	Report	Lino	Stadium: Beira-Rio; Attendance: 18,359; Referee: Matheus Delgado Candançan

9 August 2026 22	Flamengo	2–0	Vitória	Rio de Janeiro
19:30 UTC−3	Pulgar; Bruno Henrique 80' (Carrascal)	Report		Stadium: Maracanã; Attendance: 58,226; Referee: Wilton Pereira Sampaio

16 August 2026 23	Mirassol	1–5	Flamengo	Mirassol
18:30 UTC−3	João Victor	Report	Carrascal 22' (Plata); L. Araújo 53' (Carrascal); Pedro 56' (Ayrton Lucas), 66' (Carrascal); Lino 74' (de Arrascaeta)	Stadium: José Maria de Campos Maia; Attendance: 9,914; Referee: Rafael Rodrigo Klein

22 August 2026 24	Cruzeiro	2–1	Flamengo	Belo Horizonte
20:30 UTC−3	Arroyo 55' (Matheus Henrique); M. Pereira 90+5' (Villalba)	Report	Pedro 22' (de Arrascaeta)	Stadium: Mineirão; Attendance: 34,166; Referee: Rodrigo José Pereira de Lima

30 August 2026 25 Clássico da Rivalidade	Flamengo	3–0	Botafogo	Rio de Janeiro
16:00 UTC−3	Lino; Carrascal 90' (Everton)	Report		Stadium: Maracanã; Attendance: 65,970; Referee: Alex Gomes Stefano

2 September 2026 4	Flamengo	2–0	Mirassol	Rio de Janeiro
19:30 UTC−3	Carrascal; Paquetá 43' (Carrascal)	Report		Stadium: Maracanã; Attendance: 60,155; Referee: Anderson Daronco
Note: Fixture originally scheduled for 25 February 2026, postponed due to Flamengo's participation in the 2026 Recopa Sudamericana.

6 September 2026 26	Remo	0–1	Flamengo	Belém
16:00 UTC−3	Edson Fernando (red card) 90+5'	Report	Lino 65' (de Arrascaeta)	Stadium: Mangueirão; Attendance: 51,567; Referee: Lucas Casagrande

13 September 2026 27 Encontro das Nações	Flamengo	2–1	Corinthians	Rio de Janeiro
17:30 UTC−3	Paquetá 48'; Bruno Henrique 89' (Freitas)	Report	Gui Negão 78' (Kaio César)	Stadium: Maracanã; Attendance: 70,112; Referee: Wilton Pereira Sampaio

20 September 2026 28	Flamengo	2–1	Red Bull Bragantino	Rio de Janeiro
18:30 UTC−3	Varela 13' (Carrascal); Pedro	Report	Bruno Henrique 86' (o.g.)	Stadium: Maracanã; Attendance: 66,053; Referee: Rodrigo José Pereira de Lima

8 October 2026 29	Santos	2–2	Flamengo	Santos
19:30 UTC−3	Neymar 82' (pen.), 88' (pen.)	Report	Danilo; Paquetá 45+4' (Carrascal)	Stadium: Vila Belmiro; Attendance: 16,600; Referee: Anderson Daronco

11 October 2026 30 Fla–Flu	Flamengo	1–0	Fluminense	Rio de Janeiro
17:30 UTC−3	Carrascal 65' (Paquetá)	Report		Stadium: Maracanã; Attendance: 63,300; Referee: Rafael Rodrigo Klein

18 October 2026 31	Bahia	0–3	Flamengo	Salvador
18:30 UTC−3		Report	Jorginho 64' (pen.); Plata 73' (Lino); Paquetá 78' (Varela)	Stadium: Casa de Apostas Arena Fonte Nova; Attendance: 47,465; Referee: Wilton Pereira Sampaio

26 October 2026 32 Flamengo Atlético-MG rivalry	Flamengo	3–2	Atlético Mineiro	Rio de Janeiro
20:00 UTC−3	Plata 34' (Varela); de Arrascaeta 41' (Lino); Carrascal 90+9' (pen.)	Report	Bernard 7' (Preciado); Lodi	Stadium: Maracanã; Attendance: 60,624; Referee: Rodrigo José Pereira de Lima

29 October 2026 33 Clássico dos Milhões	Vasco da Gama	1–4	Flamengo	Rio de Janeiro
20:00 UTC−3	Lescano	Report	Pedro 10' (Varela), 41'; Lino 53', 85'	Stadium: Nilton Santos; Attendance: 28,470; Referee: Bruno Arleu de Araújo

4 November 2026 34	Flamengo	3–1	Grêmio	Rio de Janeiro
19:30 UTC−3	Lino 20'; Pedro 28' (Carrascal), 45+2'	Report	Amuzu 69'	Stadium: Maracanã; Attendance: 67,164; Referee: Paulo Cesar Zanovelli da Silva

18 November 2026 35	Flamengo	2–1	Athletico Paranaense	Rio de Janeiro
20:30 UTC−3	Carrascal 17' (Varela); Jorginho 27' (pen.)	Report	Vargas 11'	Stadium: Maracanã; Attendance: 68,546; Referee: Rafael Rodrigo Klein

21 November 2026 36	Palmeiras	1–1	Flamengo	São Paulo
16:30 UTC−3	Arias 12' (Giay)	Report	Samuel Lino	Stadium: Nubank Parque; Referee: Rodrigo Jose Pereira da Lima

29 November 2026 37	Coritiba	v	Flamengo	Curitiba
16:00 UTC−3		Report		Stadium: Couto Pereira

2 December 2026 38	Flamengo	v	Chapecoense	Rio de Janeiro
21:30 UTC−3		Report		Stadium: Maracanã

=== Copa do Brasil ===
==== Fifth round ====
Goals, assists and red cards are shown.

22 April 2026 1st leg	Flamengo	2–1	Vitória	Rio de Janeiro
21:30 UTC−3	E. Araújo 10' (de la Cruz); Pedro	Report	Erick 11'	Stadium: Maracanã; Attendance: 44,292; Referee: Anderson Daronco

14 May 2026 2nd leg	Vitória	2–0 (3–2 agg.)	Flamengo	Salvador
21:30 UTC−3	Erick 6' (Baralhas); Luan Cândido 61'	Report		Stadium: Barradão; Attendance: 30,793; Referee: Raphael Claus

== Management team ==
As of 4 March 2026.

Position	Name
Board of directors
Director of football	(Portugal) José Boto
Assistant director of football	(Brazil) Bruno Spindel
Coaching staff
Head coach	(Portugal) Leonardo Jardim
Assistant head coach	(Portugal) Antonio Vieira
Assistant head coach	(Brazil) Márcio de Moraes Torres
Goalkeepers trainer	(Brazil) Rogério Maia
Goalkeepers trainer	(Brazil) Thiago Eller
Performance analyst	(Portugal) Diogo Dias
Performance analyst	(Portugal) José Barros
Performance analyst	(Brazil) Arthur Souza
Performance analyst	(Brazil) Victor Saad
Head of scouting	(Ukraine) Andrii Fedchenkov
Medical staff
Health and high performance manager	(Brazil) Fernando Sassaki
Fitness coach	(Brazil) Diogo Linhares
Fitness coach	(Brazil) Arthur Peixoto
Fitness coach	(Brazil) Júnior Bezerra
Doctor	(Brazil) Marcelo Soares
Doctor	(Brazil) Fernando Bassan
Physiotherapist	(Brazil) Laniyan Neves

== Roster ==
List of currently full members of the professional team, youth players are also often used. Ages on 31 December 2026.

As of 19 September 2026

No.	Pos.	Nat.	Name	Date of birth (age)	Signed in	Contract end	Signed from	Transfer fee	Notes
Goalkeepers
1	GK	(Argentina)	Agustín Rossi	21 August 1995 (aged 31)	2023	2027	(Argentina) Boca Juniors	Free	
42	GK	(Brazil)	Andrew	1 July 2001 (aged 25)	2026	2029	(Portugal) Gil Vicente	€1.5m	
49	GK	(Brazil)	Dyogo Alves	9 January 2004 (aged 22)	2025	2026	Youth system		
Defenders
2	RB	(Uruguay)	Guillermo Varela	24 March 1993 (aged 33)	2022	2027	(Russia) Dynamo Moscow	Free	
3	CB	(Brazil)	Léo Ortiz	3 January 1996 (aged 30)	2024	2028	(Brazil) Red Bull Bragantino	€7.0m	
4	CB	(Brazil)	Léo Pereira	31 January 1996 (aged 30)	2020	2027	(Brazil) Athletico Paranaense	€6.1m	3rd Vice-captain
6	LB	(Brazil)	Ayrton Lucas	19 June 1997 (aged 29)	2022	2027	(Russia) Spartak Moscow	€7.0m	
13	CB	(Brazil)	Danilo	15 July 1991 (aged 35)	2025	2026	(Italy) Juventus FC	Free	
22	RB	(Brazil)	Emerson Royal	14 January 1999 (aged 27)	2025	2028	(Italy) AC Milan	€9.0m	
26	LB	(Brazil)	Alex Sandro	26 January 1991 (aged 35)	2024	2027	Free agent	Free	2nd Vice-captain
44	CB	(Brazil)	Vitão	2 February 2000 (aged 26)	2026	2029	(Brazil) Internacional	€10.2m	
61	CB	(Brazil)	João Victor	1 January 2007 (aged 19)	2024	2029	Youth system		
Midfielders
5	DM	(Chile)	Erick Pulgar	15 January 1994 (aged 32)	2022	2029	(Italy) Fiorentina	€3.0m	
8	CM	(Spain)	Saúl Ñíguez	21 November 1994 (aged 32)	2025	2028	(Spain) Atlético Madrid	Free	
10	AM	(Uruguay)	Giorgian de Arrascaeta	1 June 1994 (aged 32)	2019	2028	(Brazil) Cruzeiro	€15.0m	Vice-captain
11	AM	(Brazil)	Lucas Paquetá	27 August 1997 (aged 29)	2026	2030	(England) West Ham United	€42.0m	
15	AM	(Colombia)	Jorge Carrascal	25 May 1998 (aged 28)	2025	2029	(Russia) Dynamo Moscow	€12.0m	
18	CM	(Uruguay)	Nicolás de la Cruz	1 June 1997 (aged 29)	2024	2028	(Argentina) River Plate	€14.5m	
21	DM	(Italy)	Jorginho	20 December 1991 (aged 35)	2025	2028	(England) Arsenal	Free	
52	DM	(Brazil)	Evertton Araújo	28 February 2003 (aged 23)	2024	2028	Youth system		
Forwards
7	RW	(Brazil)	Luiz Araújo	2 June 1996 (aged 30)	2023	2027	(United States) Atlanta United	€9.0m	
9	CF	(Brazil)	Pedro	20 June 1997 (aged 29)	2020	2027	(Italy) Fiorentina	€14.0m	
14	RW	(Ecuador)	Anthony Valencia	21 July 2003 (aged 23)	2026	2031	(Belgium) Royal Antwerp	€5.0m	
16	LW	(Brazil)	Samuel Lino	23 December 1999 (aged 27)	2025	2029	(Spain) Atlético Madrid	€22.0m	
19	RW	(Ecuador)	Gonzalo Plata	1 November 2000 (aged 25)	2024	2029	(Qatar) Al Sadd	€3.8m	
27	LW	(Brazil)	Bruno Henrique	30 December 1990 (aged 36)	2019	2027	(Brazil) Santos	€5.4m	Captain
30	CF	(Argentina)	Joaquín Freitas	2 December 2006 (aged 20)	2026	2031	(Argentina) River Plate	€6.0m	

- - Currently injured

=== New contracts ===
No.	Pos.	Player	Date	Until	Source
–	HC	(Brazil) Filipe Luís	29 December 2025	31 December 2027	
27	FW	(Brazil) Bruno Henrique	4 May 2026	31 December 2027	
26	DF	(Brazil) Alex Sandro	19 July 2026	31 December 2027	
5	MF	(Chile) Erick Pulgar	2 September 2026	31 December 2029	

== Transfers and loans ==
=== Transfers in ===
Pos.	Player	Transferred from	Fee	Date	Team	Source
DF	(Brazil) Vitão	(Brazil) Internacional	R$66.9m / €10.2m	1 January 2026	First team	
GK	(Brazil) Andrew	(Portugal) Gil Vicente	R$9.4m / €1.5m	15 January 2026	First team	
MF	(Brazil) Lucas Paquetá	(England) West Ham United	R$262.1m / €42.0m	30 January 2026	First team	
DF	(Brazil) Ramires	(Brazil) Mirassol	Free	3 February 2026	Youth team	
FW	(Brazil) Josmar	(Brazil) Avaí	Free	3 February 2026	Youth team	
MF	(Brazil) Rayan Lucas	(Portugal) Sporting	Loan return	1 July 2026	First team	
FW	(Brazil) Lorran	(Italy) Pisa SC	Loan return	1 July 2026	First team	
MF	(Brazil) Andrew Nathan	(Brazil) Bahia	Free	15 July 2026	Youth team	
FW	(Ecuador) Anthony Valencia	(Belgium) Royal Antwerp	R$29.9m / €5.0m	1 September 2026	First team	
FW	(Argentina) Joaquín Freitas	(Argentina) River Plate	R$35.9m / €6.0m	1 September 2026	First team	
DF	(Uruguay) Matías Viña	(Argentina) River Plate	Loan return	11 September 2026	First team	
Total			R$404.2m / €64.7m			

=== Loan in ===
Pos.	Player	Loaned from	Fee	Start	End	Team	Source
DF	(Spain) Ernest Muñoz	(Brazil) Portuguesa	Free	3 February 2026	31 December 2026	Youth team	
MF	(Argentina) Juan Sayago	(Argentina) River Plate	Free	12 February 2026	31 December 2026	Youth team	
MF	(Mexico) Diego Reyes	(Mexico) Club América	Free	4 March 2026	31 December 2026	Youth team	
Total			R$0m / €0m				

=== Transfers out ===
Pos.	Player	Transferred to	Fee	Date	Team	Source
FW	(Brazil) Petterson Novaes	Free agent	Released	15 December 2025	First team	
GK	(Brazil) Matheus Cunha	(Brazil) Cruzeiro	End of contract	1 January 2026	First team	
DF	(Brazil) Cleiton	(Germany) VfL Wolfsburg	End of contract	1 January 2026	First team	
DF	(Brazil) Pablo	(Brazil) São Bernardo	End of contract	1 January 2026	First team	
FW	(Brazil) Pedro Leão	(United States) Orlando City	Free	1 January 2026	Youth team	
FW	(Brazil) Juninho	(Mexico) Pumas UNAM	R$32.3m / €5.0m	1 January 2026	First team	
MF	(Brazil) Victor Hugo	(Brazil) Atlético Mineiro	R$13.4m / €2.2m	18 January 2026	First team	
FW	(Brazil) Michael	Free agent	Released	30 January 2026	First team	
DF	(Brazil) Iago Teodoro	(United States) Orlando City	R$7.3m / €1.2m	7 February 2026	First team	
FW	(Brazil) Ryan Roberto	(Ukraine) Shakhtar Donetsk	R$56.0m / €9.5m	1 July 2026	First team	
DF	(Brazil) João Pedro Da Mata	(Turkey) Konyaspor	R$1.5m / €0.26m	11 July 2026	Youth team	
MF	(Brazil) Rayan Lucas	(Portugal) Alverca	Free	8 August 2026	First team	
FW	(Ecuador) Gonzalo Plata	(Russia) Dynamo Moscow	R$60.2m / €10.0m	28 August 2026	First team	
FW	(Brazil) Wallace Yan	(Brazil) Red Bull Bragantino	R$36.1m / €6.0m	2 September 2026	First team	
FW	(Brazil) Guilherme Gomes	(Portugal) Gil Vicente	R$2.4m / €0.4m	2 September 2026	First team	
FW	(Brazil) Everton	(Brazil) Santos	Free	9 September 2026	First team	
FW	(Brazil) Lorran	(United Arab Emirates) Sharjah	R$7.7m / €1.3m	18 September 2026	First team	
Total			R$156.7m / €25.86m			

Transfer canceled

=== Loan out ===
Pos.	Player	Loaned to	Fee	Start	End	Team	Source
FW	(Brazil) Carlinhos	(Brazil) Remo	Free	1 January 2026	31 December 2026	First team	
DF	(Uruguay) Matías Viña	(Argentina) River Plate	R$5.4m / €0.4m	4 January 2026	31 December 2026	First team	
MF	(Brazil) Allan	(Brazil) Corinthians	Free	9 February 2026	31 December 2026	First team	
DF	(Brazil) Gusttavo	(Portugal) Estoril Praia	Free	5 September 2026	30 June 2027	First team	
DF	(Uruguay) Matías Viña	(Argentina) River Plate	Free	11 September 2026	31 December 2026	First team	
Total			R$5.4m / €0.4m				

== Statistics ==
As of 4 November 2026

=== Manager records ===
Name	Nat	Record							
Name	Nat	G	W	D	L	GF	GA	GD	Win %
Filipe Luís	Brazil	12	6	1	5	28	14	+14	50.00
Leonardo Jardim	Portugal	46	30	12	4	89	33	+56	65.22
Bruno Pivetti (interim) (Note: Bruno Pivetti was in charge of an under-20 side in the first three 2026 Campeonato Carioca matches, as the main squad was in pre-season training.)	Brazil	3	0	1	2	2	6	−4	0.00
Total		61	36	14	11	119	53	+66	59.02

=== Appearances ===
Source: Soccerway, FBRef

Players in italics have left the club before the end of the season.
^{†} Denotes two way player, available to play for youth and professional team.

No.	Pos.	Name	Série A		Copa do Brasil		Libertadores		Carioca		Other (Note: Includes Supercopa do Brasil, Recopa Sudamericana.)		Total		
No.	Pos.	Name	Starts	Subs	Starts	Subs	Starts	Subs	Starts	Subs	Starts	Subs	Starts	Subs	Apps
Goalkeepers
1	GK	(Argentina) Agustín Rossi	34	0	2	0	11	0	2	0	3	0	52	0	52
42	GK	(Brazil) Andrew	0	0	0	0	1	0	5	0	0	0	6	0	6
49	GK	(Brazil) Dyogo Alves	0	0	0	0	0	0	0	0	–	–	0	0	0
58	GK	(Brazil) Léo Nannetti^{†}	–	–	–	–	–	–	3	0	–	–	3	0	3
71	GK	(Brazil) Pedro Batista^{†}	–	–	–	–	–	–	0	0	–	–	0	0	0
Defenders
2	RB	(Uruguay) Guillermo Varela	23	3	0	1	0	4	1	1	3	0	27	9	36
3	CB	(Brazil) Léo Ortiz	28	1	1	0	7	1	3	1	2	1	40	5	45
4	CB	(Brazil) Léo Pereira	29	0	1	0	10	0	2	0	3	0	45	0	45
6	LB	(Brazil) Ayrton Lucas	14	6	1	0	8	1	3	0	1	1	27	8	35
13	CB	(Brazil) Danilo	6	5	2	0	5	0	3	0	1	0	17	5	22
22	RB	(Brazil) Emerson Royal	13	4	2	0	12	0	6	0	0	0	33	4	37
26	LB	(Brazil) Alex Sandro	18	3	1	1	4	0	3	1	2	0	28	5	33
42	CB	(Brazil) João Victor Carbone^{†}	–	–	–	–	–	–	1	0	–	–	1	0	1
44	CB	(Brazil) Vitão	6	4	0	0	2	0	6	0	0	0	14	4	18
46	CB	(Brazil) Germano^{†}	–	–	–	–	–	–	0	0	–	–	0	0	0
51	RB	(Brazil) Daniel Sales^{†}	0	0	–	–	–	–	4	0	0	0	4	0	4
61	CB	(Brazil) João Victor^{†}	0	1	–	–	–	–	3	0	–	–	3	1	4
76	RB	(Brazil) Wanderson^{†}	–	–	–	–	–	–	0	1	–	–	0	1	1
77	CB	(Brazil) Johnny Góes^{†}	0	1	–	–	–	–	2	0	–	–	2	1	3
87	CB	(Brazil) Daniel Thuram^{†}	0	0	–	–	–	–	0	1	–	–	0	1	1
Midfielders
5	DM	(Chile) Erick Pulgar	22	2	–	–	6	1	3	2	3	0	36	5	41
8	MF	(Spain) Saúl Ñíguez	3	9	0	1	2	2	–	–	–	–	5	12	17
10	AM	(Uruguay) Giorgian de Arrascaeta	19	5	0	1	6	3	1	2	3	0	29	11	40
15	AM	(Colombia) Jorge Carrascal	17	10	1	0	8	3	7	0	3	0	36	13	49
18	CM	(Uruguay) Nicolás de la Cruz	1	13	1	0	2	2	2	0	0	2	6	17	23
20	CM	(Brazil) Lucas Paquetá	17	7	–	–	4	5	3	2	1	2	25	16	41
21	DM	(Italy) Jorginho	23	4	1	0	8	0	1	0	1	1	34	5	39
52	DM	(Brazil) Evertton Araújo	12	8	2	0	6	1	5	1	1	0	26	10	36
56	CM	(Brazil) Pablo Lúcio^{†}	0	0	–	–	–	–	3	0	–	–	3	0	3
66	AM	(Brazil) Bruno Xavier^{†}	–	–	–	–	–	–	0	0	–	–	0	0	0
67	CM	(Brazil) Kaio Júnior^{†}	–	–	–	–	–	–	0	0	–	–	0	0	2
69	DM	(Brazil) Kaio Nóbrega^{†}	–	–	–	–	–	–	1	1	–	–	1	1	2
72	CM	(Brazil) Lucas Vieira^{†}	–	–	–	–	–	–	2	0	–	–	2	0	2
75	CM	(Brazil) Luiz Felipe^{†}	0	0	–	–	–	–	0	1	–	–	0	1	1
79	AM	(Brazil) Joshua^{†}	0	1	–	–	–	–	3	0	–	–	3	1	4
Forwards
7	RW	(Brazil) Luiz Araújo	6	12	2	0	4	3	1	5	1	0	14	20	34
9	CF	(Brazil) Pedro	33	1	1	1	3	7	5	1	1	2	43	12	55
14	RW	(Ecuador) Anthony Valencia	0	1	–	–	0	0	–	–	–	–	0	1	1
16	LW	(Brazil) Samuel Lino	28	5	1	1	9	2	4	3	1	1	43	12	55
19	RW	(Ecuador) Gonzalo Plata	13	8	0	1	4	6	4	2	2	0	23	17	40
27	LW	(Brazil) Bruno Henrique	4	23	2	0	10	2	2	2	0	2	18	29	47
30	CF	(Argentina) Joaquín Freitas	0	8	–	–	0	2	–	–	–	–	0	10	10
39	CF	(Brazil) Josmar^{†}	0	0	–	–	–	–	–	–	–	–	0	0	0
59	RW	(Brazil) Alan Santos^{†}	–	–	–	–	–	–	1	2	–	–	1	2	3
63	RW	(Brazil) David Viana^{†}	–	–	–	–	–	–	0	2	–	–	0	2	2
80	CF	(Brazil) João Camargo^{†}	–	–	–	–	–	–	0	1	–	–	0	1	1
81	CF	(Brazil) Douglas Telles^{†}	0	0	–	–	–	–	3	1	0	0	3	1	4
Player(s) transferred out during the season
11	LW	(Brazil) Everton	4	8	1	1	0	1	3	4	1	2	9	16	25
29	DM	(Brazil) Allan	–	–	–	–	–	–	1	0	–	–	1	0	1
30	LW	(Brazil) Michael	–	–	–	–	–	–	0	0	–	–	0	0	0
35	DM	(Brazil) Rayan Lucas	–	–	–	–	–	–	–	–	–	–	0	0	0
41	CB	(Brazil) João Pedro Da Mata^{†}	–	–	–	–	–	–	0	0	–	–	0	0	0
47	CF	(Brazil) Guilherme Gomes^{†}	0	0	–	–	–	–	3	0	–	–	3	0	3
57	CB	(Brazil) Iago Teodoro^{†}	–	–	–	–	–	–	3	0	–	–	3	0	3
64	CF	(Brazil) Wallace Yan	0	7	0	1	0	2	2	1	–	–	2	11	13
74	RB	(Brazil) Gusttavo^{†}	–	–	–	–	–	–	0	2	–	–	0	2	2
86	LW	(Brazil) Ryan Roberto^{†}	–	–	–	–	–	–	0	2	–	–	0	1	1
99	RW	(Brazil) Lorran	1	2	–	–	–	–	–	–	–	–	1	2	3

=== Goalscorers ===
Rank	Pos.	No.	Player	Série A	Copa do Brasil	Libertadores	Carioca	Other (Note: Includes Supercopa do Brasil, Recopa Sudamericana.)	Total
1	FW	9	(Brazil) Pedro	20	1	2	6	0	29
2	FW	16	(Brazil) Samuel Lino	12	0	1	2	0	15
3	MF	20	(Brazil) Lucas Paquetá	7	–	3	3	0	13
4	MF	10	(Uruguay) Giorgian de Arrascaeta	4	0	4	1	1	10
5	FW	27	(Brazil) Bruno Henrique	2	0	5	2	0	9
6	MF	15	(Colombia) Jorge Carrascal	7	0	0	1	0	8
7	FW	7	(Brazil) Luiz Araújo	2	0	1	1	0	4
7	MF	21	(Italy) Jorginho	3	0	0	0	1	4
7	FW	19	(Ecuador) Gonzalo Plata	4	0	0	0	0	4
10	MF	5	(Chile) Erick Pulgar	2	–	0	1	0	3
10	FW	11	(Brazil) Everton	1	0	0	2	0	3
10	DF	4	(Brazil) Léo Pereira	2	0	1	0	0	3
13	DF	2	(Uruguay) Guillermo Varela	1	0	0	0	0	1
13	DF	3	(Brazil) Léo Ortiz	1	0	0	0	0	1
13	DF	13	(Brazil) Danilo	1	0	0	0	0	1
13	MF	18	(Uruguay) Nicolás de la Cruz	0	0	0	1	0	1
13	FW	47	(Brazil) Guilherme Gomes	0	–	–	1	–	1
13	MF	52	(Brazil) Evertton Araújo	0	1	0	0	0	1
13	DF	57	(Brazil) Iago Teodoro	–	–	–	1	–	1
13	FW	81	(Brazil) Douglas Telles	0	–	–	1	–	1
13	FW	99	(Brazil) Lorran	1	–	–	–	–	1
Own Goal(s)				1	0	0	1	0	2
Total				71	2	20	24	2	119

=== Penalty kicks ===
Includes only penalty kicks taken during matches.

Rank	Pos.	No.	Player	Série A	Copa do Brasil	Libertadores	Carioca	Other (Note: Includes Supercopa do Brasil, Recopa Sudamericana.)	Total
1	MF	21	(Italy) Jorginho	3 / 3	– / –	– / –	– / –	1 / 1	4 / 4
2	MF	10	(Uruguay) Giorgian de Arrascaeta	1 / 1	– / –	– / –	1 / 1	1 / 1	3 / 3
3	MF	15	(Colombia) Jorge Carrascal	1 / 1	– / –	– / –	– / –	– / –	1 / 1
3	MF	20	(Brazil) Lucas Paquetá	– / –	– / –	1 / 1	– / –	– / –	1 / 1
Total				5 / 5	0 / 0	1 / 1	1 / 1	2 / 2	9 / 9

=== Assists ===
Rank	Pos.	No.	Player	Série A	Copa do Brasil	Libertadores	Carioca	Other (Note: Includes Supercopa do Brasil, Recopa Sudamericana.)	Total
1	FW	16	(Brazil) Samuel Lino	9	0	1	3	0	13
2	MF	15	(Colombia) Jorge Carrascal	9	0	0	3	0	12
3	FW	9	(Brazil) Pedro	6	0	3	1	0	10
4	FW	27	(Brazil) Bruno Henrique	3	1	2	2	0	8
5	FW	2	(Uruguay) Guillermo Varela	6	0	0	0	0	6
6	MF	10	(Uruguay) Giorgian de Arrascaeta	4	0	1	0	0	5
6	DF	22	(Brazil) Emerson Royal	1	0	1	3	–	5
8	DF	6	(Brazil) Ayrton Lucas	2	0	2	0	0	4
9	FW	19	(Ecuador) Gonzalo Plata	3	0	0	0	0	3
9	MF	21	(Italy) Jorginho	3	0	0	0	0	3
11	FW	7	(Brazil) Luiz Araújo	1	0	1	0	0	2
11	FW	11	(Brazil) Everton	2	0	0	0	0	2
11	MF	52	(Brazil) Evertton Araújo	1	0	0	1	0	2
14	GK	1	(Argentina) Agustín Rossi	0	0	1	0	0	1
14	DF	3	(Brazil) Léo Ortiz	1	0	0	0	0	1
14	DF	4	(Brazil) Léo Pereira	1	0	0	0	0	1
14	MF	8	(Spain) Saúl Ñiguez	1	0	0	–	–	1
14	MF	18	(Uruguay) Nicolás de la Cruz	0	1	0	0	0	1
14	MF	20	(Brazil) Lucas Paquetá	1	0	0	0	0	1
14	DF	26	(Brazil) Alex Sandro	0	0	0	1	0	1
14	FW	30	(Argentina) Joaquín Freitas	1	–	–	–	–	1
14	DF	44	(Brazil) Vitão	0	–	0	1	0	1
14	DF	51	(Brazil) Daniel Sales	0	–	–	1	–	1
14	FW	64	(Brazil) Wallace Yan	0	0	0	1	–	1
Total				56	2	11	17	0	86

=== Clean sheets ===
Rank	No.	Player	Série A	Copa do Brasil	Libertadores	Carioca	Other (Note: Includes Supercopa do Brasil, Recopa Sudamericana.)	Total
1	1	(Argentina) Agustín Rossi	14 / 34	0 / 2	6 / 11	2 / 2	0 / 3	22 / 52
2	42	(Brazil) Andrew	– / –	– / –	1 / 1	2 / 5	– / –	3 / 6
3	58	(Brazil) Léo Nannetti	– / –	– / –	– / –	0 / 3	– / –	0 / 3
Total			14 / 34	0 / 2	7 / 12	4 / 10	0 / 3	25 / 61

=== Penalty kick saves ===
Includes only penalty kicks saves during matches.

Rank	No.	Player	Série A	Copa do Brasil	Libertadores	Carioca	Other (Note: Includes Supercopa do Brasil, Recopa Sudamericana.)	Total
1	1	(Argentina) Agustín Rossi	1 / 3	– / –	– / –	– / –	– / –	1 / 1
Total			1 / 3	0 / 0	0 / 0	0 / 0	0 / 0	1 / 3

=== Season records ===
==== Individual ====
- Most matches played in the season in all competitions: 55 – Pedro and Samuel Lino
- Most League matches played in the season: 34 – Agustín Rossi and Pedro
- Most matches played as starter in the season in all competitions: 52 – Agustín Rossi
- Most League matches played as starter in the season: 34 – Agustín Rossi
- Most matches played as substitute in the season in all competitions: 29 – Bruno Henrique
- Most League matches played as substitute in the season: 23 – Bruno Henrique
- Most goals in the season in all competitions: 29 – Pedro
- Most League goals in the season: 20 – Pedro
- Most clean sheets in the season in all competitions: 22 – Agustín Rossi
- Most League clean sheets in the season: 14 – Agustín Rossi
- Most goals scored in a match: 4
  - Pedro vs Madureira, Campeonato Carioca, 2 March 2026
- Goals in consecutive matches in all competitions: 2
  - Everton, 7 February 2026 to 10 February 2026
  - Erick Pulgar, 10 February 2026 to 15 February 2026
  - Giorgian de Arrascaeta, 22 February 2026 to 26 February 2026
  - Pedro, 11 March 2026 to 14 March 2026
  - Samuel Lino, 14 March 2026 to 19 March 2026
  - Pedro, 12 April 2026 to 16 April 2026
  - Lucas Paquetá, 16 April 2026 to 19 April 2026
  - Giorgian de Arrascaeta, 16 April 2026 to 19 April 2026
  - Pedro, 22 April 2026 to 26 April 2026
  - Pedro, 17 May 2026 to 20 May 2026
  - Pedro, 30 May 2026 to 22 July 2026
  - Samuel Lino, 16 August 2026 to 19 August 2026
  - Jorge Carrascal, 30 August 2026 to 2 September 2026
  - Bruno Henrique, 10 September 2026 to 13 September 2026
  - Pedro, 29 October 2026 to 4 November 2026
  - Samuel Lino, 29 October 2026 to 4 November 2026
- Goals in consecutive League matches: 2
  - Pedro, 11 March 2026 to 14 March 2026
  - Samuel Lino, 14 March 2026 to 19 March 2026
  - Pedro, 5 April 2026 to 12 April 2026
  - Giorgian de Arrascaeta, 19 April 2026 to 26 April 2026
  - Pedro, 26 April 2026 to 3 May 2026
  - Pedro, 30 May 2026 to 22 July 2026
  - Pedro, 16 August 2026 to 22 August 2026
  - Jorge Carrascal, 30 August 2026 to 2 September 2026
  - Gonzalo Plata, 18 October 2026 to 26 October 2026
  - Pedro, 29 October 2026 to 4 November 2026
  - Samuel Lino, 29 October 2026 to 4 November 2026
- Fastest goal: 3 minutes
  - Lucas Paquetá vs Corinthians, Série A, 22 March 2026
- Hat-tricks: 1
  - Pedro vs Madureira, Campeonato Carioca, 2 March 2026 (4 goals)
- Oldest goalscorer: Bruno Henrique – 35 years, 257 days (vs Corinthians, Série A, 10 September 2026)
- Youngest goalscorer: Douglas Telles – 18 years, 251 days (vs Sampaio Corrêa, Campeonato Carioca, 7 February 2026)
- Most assists in the season in all competitions: 13 – Samuel Lino
- Most League assists in the season: 9 – Samuel Lino
- Most assists in a match: 2
  - Samuel Lino vs Sampaio Corrêa, Campeonato Carioca, 7 February 2026
  - Emerson Royal vs Sampaio Corrêa, Campeonato Carioca, 7 February 2026
  - Jorge Carrascal vs Madureira, Campeonato Carioca, 2 March 2026
  - Guillermo Varela vs Botafogo, Série A, 14 March 2026
  - Samuel Lino vs Fluminense, Série A, 12 April 2026
  - Samuel Lino vs Atlético Mineiro, Série A, 26 April 2026
  - Jorge Carrascal vs Mirassol, Série A, 16 August 2026
  - Pedro vs Cruzeiro, Copa Libertadores, 19 August 2026
- Assists in consecutive matches in all competitions: 2
  - Pedro, 26 May 2026 to 30 May 2026
  - Jorge Carrascal, 30 August 2026 to 2 September 2026
- Assists in consecutive League matches: 3
  - Guillermo Varela, 18 October 2026 to 29 October 2026

==== Team ====
- Biggest home win in all competitions:
  - 7–1 vs Sampaio Corrêa, Campeonato Carioca, 7 February 2026
- Biggest League home win:
  - 3–0 vs Remo,Série A, 19 March 2026
  - 3–0 vs Coritiba,Série A, 30 May 2026
  - 3–0 vs Botafogo,Série A, 30 August 2026
- Biggest away win in all competitions:
  - 8–0 vs Madureira, Campeonato Carioca, 2 March 2026
- Biggest League away win:
  - 4–0 vs Atlético Mineiro, Série A, 26 April 2026
  - 4–0 vs Chapecoense, Série A, 22 July 2026
  - 5–1 vs Mirassol, Série A, 16 August 2026
- Biggest home loss in all competitions:
  - 0–3 vs Palmeiras, Série A, 23 May 2026
- Biggest League home loss:
  - 0–3 vs Palmeiras, Série A, 23 May 2026
- Biggest away loss in all competitions:
  - 0–3 vs Volta Redonda, Campeonato Carioca, 17 January 2026
  - 0–3 vs Red Bull Bragantino, Série A, 2 April 2026
- Biggest League away loss:
  - 0–3 vs Red Bull Bragantino, Série A, 2 April 2026
- Highest scoring match in all competitions:
  - 7–1 vs Sampaio Corrêa, Campeonato Carioca, 7 February 2026
  - 8–0 vs Madureira, Campeonato Carioca, 2 March 2026
- Highest scoring League match:
  - 5–1 vs Mirassol, Série A, 16 August 2026
- Longest winning run in all competitions: 7 consecutive match(es)
  - 5 April 2026 to 26 April 2026
- Longest League winning run: 5 consecutive match(es)
  - 30 August 2026 to 20 September 2026
- Longest unbeaten run in all competitions: 15 consecutive match(es)
  - 30 August 2026 to 4 November 2026
- Longest League unbeaten run: 11 consecutive match(es)
  - 30 August 2026 to 4 November 2026
- Longest losing run in all competitions: 3 consecutive match(es)
  - 25 January 2026 to 1 February 2026
- Longest League losing run: 1 consecutive match(es)
  - 28 January 2026
  - 2 April 2026
  - 23 May 2026
  - 22 August 2026
- Longest without win run in all competitions: 4 consecutive match(es)
  - 25 January 2026 to 4 February 2026
- Longest without League win run: 2 consecutive match(es)
  - 28 January 2026 to 4 February 2026
  - 22 March 2026 to 2 April 2026
  - 17 May 2026 to 23 May 2026
  - 26 July 2026 to 29 July 2029
- Longest scoring run in all competitions: 19 consecutive match(es)
  - 26 May 2026 to 11 October 2026
- Longest League scoring run: 18 consecutive match(es)
  - 30 May 2026 to 4 November 2026
- Longest without scoring run in all competitions: 1 consecutive match(es)
  - 17 January 2026
  - 1 February 2026
  - 19 February 2026
  - 8 March 2026
  - 2 April 2026
  - 14 May 2026
  - 23 May 2026
  - 15 October 2026
- Longest League without scoring run: 1 consecutive match(es)
  - 2 April 2026
  - 23 May 2026
- Longest conceding goals run in all competitions: 8 consecutive match(es)
  - 25 January 2026 to 19 February 2026
- Longest League conceding goals run: 4 consecutive match(es)
  - 22 March 2026 to 12 April 2026
- Longest without conceding goals run in all competitions: 5 consecutive match(es)
  - 2 March 2026 to 19 March 2026
- Longest League without conceding goals run: 3 consecutive match(es)
  - 11 March 2026 to 19 March 2026
  - 30 August 2026 to 6 September 2026

=== National Team statistics ===
As of 5 July 2026

Appearances and goals while playing for Flamengo, includes only FIFA matches.

No.	Pos.	Name	Nat. Team	Friendlies		FIFA World Cup		Total	
No.	Pos.	Name	Nat. Team	Apps	Goals	Apps	Goals	Apps	Goals
2	DF	Guillermo Varela	Uruguay	2	0	3	0	5	0
4	DF	Léo Pereira	Brazil	4	0	0	0	4	0
9	FW	Pedro	Brazil	–	–	–	–	0	0
10	MF	Giorgian de Arrascaeta	Uruguay	2	0	0	0	2	0
13	DF	Danilo	Brazil	3	0	5	0	8	0
14	FW	Anthony Valencia	Ecuador	–	–	–	–	0	0
15	MF	Jorge Carrascal	Colombia	3	0	0	0	3	0
16	FW	Samuel Lino	Brazil	–	–	–	–	0	0
18	MF	Nicolás de la Cruz	Uruguay	1	0	3	0	4	0
19	FW	Gonzalo Plata	Ecuador	2	0	4	1	6	1
20	MF	Lucas Paquetá	Brazil	2	1	4	0	6	1
26	DF	Alex Sandro	Brazil	2	0	1	0	3	0

=== Attendance ===
Includes all competition home matches in the 2026 season. Attendances recorded represent actual gate attendance, not paid attendance.

Campeonato Carioca
Stadium	Matches	Average	Highest attendance	Lowest attendance
Maracanã	3	32,734	50,504	22,730
Raulino de Oliveira	1	5,755	5,755	5,755
Total	4	25,989	103,956	
Copa do Brasil
Stadium	Matches	Average	Highest attendance	Lowest attendance
Maracanã	1	44,292	44,292	44,292
Total	1	44,292	44,292	
Recopa Sudamericana
Stadium	Matches	Average	Highest attendance	Lowest attendance
Maracanã	1	64,470	64,470	64,470
Total	1	64,470	64,470	
Copa Libertadores
Stadium	Matches	Average	Highest attendance	Lowest attendance
Maracanã	6	58,626	72,492	34,796
Total	6	55,853	351,759	
Série A
Stadium	Matches	Average	Highest attendance	Lowest attendance
Maracanã	17	62,404	70,791	47,214
Total	17	62,684	1,065,632	
Season total	29	56,214	1,630,209	

== Individual awards ==
Name	Position	Nat.	Award
