= Ryan Roberto =

Brazilian footballer (born 2008)

Personal information
- Full name: Ryan Roberto de Oliveira Dantas
- Date of birth: 5 March 2008 (age 18)
- Place of birth: São Paulo, Brazil
- Height: 1.78 m (5 ft 10 in)
- Position: Forward

Team information
- Current team: Shakhtar Donetsk
- Number: 71

Youth career
- Athletico Paranaense
- 2023–2026: Flamengo

Senior career*
Years	Team	Apps	(Gls)
2026	Flamengo	2	(0)
2026–	Shakhtar Donetsk	0	(0)
- * Club domestic league appearances and goals as of 10 September 2026

Ryan Roberto de Oliveira Dantas (born 5 March 2008) is a Brazilian professional footballer who plays as a forward for Shakhtar Donetsk.

== Club career ==
Born in São Paulo, Ryan Roberto is a youth product of Flamengo which he joined from Athletico Paranaense in 2023.

Appearing as a prospect of the Carioca club as a prolific goalscorer with the youth categories, he started playing with the under-20 during the 2025 season, while also gaining international attention.

He was first called to Flamengo's first team by Filipe Luís in September 2025, with injuries however delaying his debut.

Ryan made his professional debut with Flamengo in a 2–1 Campeonato Carioca loss to Bangu on 15 January 2026.

With his contract ending in March 2027 and the possibility of leaving the club on a free transfer, reports of interest from big European clubs kept on emerging.

On 20 June 2026, Ukrainian Premier League club Shakhtar Donetsk announced the signing of Roberto from Flamengo, on a contract until 30 June 2031.

== Career statistics ==
As of match played 17 September 2026

Appearances and goals by club, season and competition
Club	Season	League			State League		Cup		Continental		Other		Total	
Club	Season	Division	Apps	Goals	Apps	Goals	Apps	Goals	Apps	Goals	Apps	Goals	Apps	Goals
Flamengo	2026	Série A	0	0	2	0	0	0	—		—		2	0
Shakhtar Donetsk	2026–27	Ukrainian Premier League	0	0	—		1	0	0	0	—		1	0
Career total			0	0	2	0	1	0	0	0	0	0	3	0
