= Emerson Royal =

Brazilian footballer (born 1999)

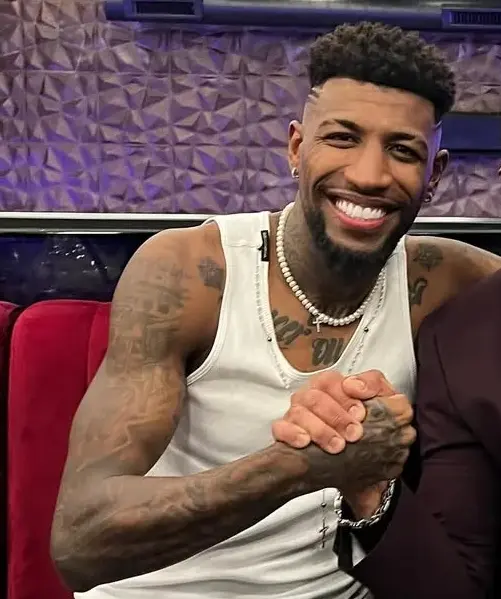
- Emerson in 2024

Personal information
- Full name: Emerson Aparecido Leite de Souza Junior
- Date of birth: 14 January 1999 (age 27)
- Place of birth: São Paulo, Brazil
- Height: 1.83 m (6 ft 0 in)
- Positions: Right-back; right wing-back; centre-back; left-back

Team information
- Current team: Flamengo
- Number: 22

Youth career
- Condor
- Unidos da Cordenonsi
- Guanabara
- Palmeiras
- Grêmio
- São Paulo
- 2014–2016: Ponte Preta

Senior career*
Years	Team	Apps	(Gls)
2016–2018	Ponte Preta	19	(1)
2018–2019	Atlético Mineiro	23	(1)
2019	→ Betis (loan)	6	(0)
2019–2021	Barcelona	3	(0)
2019–2021	→ Betis (loan)	67	(4)
2021–2024	Tottenham Hotspur	79	(4)
2024–2025	AC Milan	17	(0)
2025–	Flamengo	30	(1)

International career^{‡}
2017–2019	Brazil U20	11	(0)
2019–2020	Brazil U23	10	(0)
2019–	Brazil	10	(0)
Medal record
Men's Football
Representing Brazil
Copa América
Runner-up	2021 Brazil
- * Club domestic league appearances and goals as of 03:48, 23 July 2026 (UTC) ‡ National team caps and goals as of 22 November 2023

Emerson Aparecido Leite de Souza Junior (born 14 January 1999), known as Emerson Royal or simply Emerson, is a Brazilian professional footballer who plays as a right-back or centre-back for Campeonato Brasileiro Série A club Flamengo and the Brazil national team.

== Early life ==
Emerson was born in São Paulo and was raised in Americana. He got his nickname "Royal" as his uncle said he resembled the mascot of the Royal-branded gelatin dessert sold in Brazil.

== Club career ==
=== Ponte Preta ===
Emerson joined Ponte Preta's youth setup in 2014, after notably representing Palmeiras, São Paulo and Grêmio. After appearing as an unused substitute in some matches of the 2016 Campeonato Brasileiro Série A, he made his senior debut on 22 February 2017, replacing injured Artur in a 2–2 Campeonato Paulista away draw against Linense. Despite being booked and conceding a penalty, he was given his first start three days later, in a 1–0 home defeat of São Bernardo.

Emerson made his Série A debut on 5 November 2017, replacing injured John Kleber in a 2–0 loss at Bahia. He contributed with three league appearances during the campaign, as his side suffered relegation.

Promoted to the first team ahead of the 2018 season, Emerson became a regular starter for Macaca, making 14 appearances in the 2018 Campeonato Paulista. On 2 April 2018, he scored his first professional goal, the winning one in the Campeonato Paulista do Interior final against Mirassol.

=== Atlético Mineiro ===
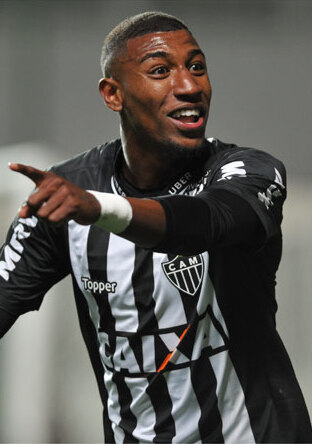
Emerson playing for Atlético Mineiro in 2018

On 27 April 2018, Emerson signed a five-year deal with Atlético Mineiro, for a rumoured fee of R$5 million. As a part of the deal, Danilo Barcelos moved in the opposite direction on loan.

Emerson made his debut for the club on 19 May 2018, shortly after turning 19, playing the full 90 minutes in a 1–0 win over rivals Cruzeiro. Initially a backup to Patric, he ended the year with 23 league appearances. He scored his first goal in the top tier on 30 September, netting his team's third in a 5–2 home routing of Sport.

=== Real Betis and Barcelona ===
On 31 January 2019, Atlético announced the transfer of Emerson to Barcelona, effective as of July 2019, for €12.7 million. The deal consisted of a joint financial operation between Barcelona and fellow La Liga side Real Betis, in which each club paid half of the transfer fee and retained a percentage of Emerson's economic rights.

He was to become a Betis player in July 2019, with Barcelona holding the option of reacquiring him for €6 million in 2021. Emerson initially joined Betis on loan from Atlético for the remainder of the 2018–19 season, during which period he made seven appearances for the club. He then became a regular starter for the Andalusians, and scored his first goal abroad on 27 September 2019, but in a 1–5 loss to Villarreal. He scored 3 goals and added 6 assists that season in 34 appearances for Betis, only missing 3 La Liga games.

On 2 June 2021, Barcelona exercised their option to bring back Emerson for three seasons by paying Betis €9 million.

=== Tottenham Hotspur ===
On the final day of the 2021 summer transfer window, Tottenham signed Emerson on a five-year deal for a reported £25.8 million transfer fee. His debut was in the Premier League away to Crystal Palace which Tottenham lost 3–0 on 11 September.

On 3 April 2022, he scored his first goal for Tottenham in a 5–1 home win against Newcastle United. On October 1, 2022, during the second half of Tottenham's Premier League away game against Arsenal, Royal received a straight red card for his tackle on Gabriel Martinelli. The team went on to lose 3–1 in the North London derby.

On 28 March 2023, the club announced he would undergo surgery on a knee injury he sustained on international duty with Brazil. On August 13, 2023, Emerson Royal scored a drilled shot from outside the box to secure a 2–2 draw against Brentford on the opening game of the 2023–24 Premier League season. Due to a large amount of injuries at the club, Emerson filled in as a starter at left-back and centre-back as well as his natural right-back position throughout the first half of the season, widely impressing with his displays. On 22 January 2024, it was reported that Tottenham Hotspur had rejected a £20 million bid from Saudi club Al-Nassr for Emerson.

=== AC Milan ===
On 12 August 2024, Emerson joined Italian Serie A club AC Milan on a four-year deal. Emerson came off the bench to make his debut in the 2–1 away defeat to Parma.

=== Flamengo ===
On 26 July 2025, Emerson joined Campeonato Brasileiro Série A club Flamengo and signed a three year contract with the club.

== International career ==
Emerson was called up to the Brazil under-20 team for the 2017 Toulon Tournament. He was the first-choice right-back at the 2019 South American U-20 Championship and the 2019 Toulon Tournament, having won the latter with Brazil's under-23 side. Emerson made his senior international debut for Brazil on 19 November 2019, coming off the bench in a 3–0 victory over South Korea.

On 11 June 2021, Emerson was called up by manager Tite for the 2021 Copa América. He made his tournament debut on 17 June, playing the last six minutes in a 4–0 thrashing of Peru in Brazil's second group match. Ten days later, he was given his first start as he played the full match in a 1–1 draw in their final group stage match against Ecuador. On 10 July, he played in the final, after coming on in the 76th minute in their 0–1 defeat against Argentina.

== Career statistics ==
=== Club ===
As of match played 22 July 2026

Appearances and goals by club, season and competition
Club	Season	League			State league (Note: Includes Campeonato Paulista, Campeonato Carioca)		National cup (Note: Includes Copa do Brasil, Copa del Rey, FA Cup)		League cup (Note: Includes EFL Cup)		Continental		Other		Total	
Club	Season	Division	Apps	Goals	Apps	Goals	Apps	Goals	Apps	Goals	Apps	Goals	Apps	Goals	Apps	Goals
Ponte Preta	2016	Série A	0	0	0	0	0	0	—		—		0	0	0	0
Ponte Preta	2017	Série A	3	0	2	0	1	0	—		0	0	0	0	6	0
Ponte Preta	2018	Série B	0	0	14	1	5	0	—		—		0	0	19	1
Ponte Preta	Total		3	0	16	1	6	0	—		0	0	0	0	25	1
Atlético Mineiro	2018	Série A	23	1	—		—		—		—		—		23	1
Real Betis (loan)	2018–19	La Liga	6	0	—		0	0	—		1 (Note: Appearance in UEFA Europa League)	0	—		7	0
Real Betis (loan)	2019–20	La Liga	33	3	—		1	0	—		—		—		34	3
Real Betis (loan)	2020–21	La Liga	34	1	—		4	1	—		—		—		38	2
Real Betis (loan)	Total		73	4	—		5	1	—		1	0	—		79	5
Barcelona	2021–22	La Liga	3	0	—		0	0	—		0	0	0	0	3	0
Tottenham Hotspur	2021–22	Premier League	31	1	—		3	0	4	0	3 (Note: Appearances in UEFA Europa Conference League)	0	—		41	1
Tottenham Hotspur	2022–23	Premier League	26	2	—		2	0	0	0	8 (Note: Appearances in UEFA Champions League)	0	—		36	2
Tottenham Hotspur	2023–24	Premier League	22	1	—		1	0	1	0	—		—		24	1
Tottenham Hotspur	Total		79	4	—		6	0	5	0	11	0	—		101	4
AC Milan	2024–25	Serie A	17	0	—		0	0	—		6	0	2 (Note: Appearances in Supercoppa Italiana)	0	25	0
Flamengo	2025	Série A	15	1	—		1	0	—		3 (Note: Appearances in Copa Libertadores)	0	0	0	19	1
Flamengo	2026	Série A	9	0	6	0	2	0	—		5	0	0	0	22	0
Flamengo	Total		24	1	6	0	3	0	—		8	0	0	0	41	1
Career total			222	10	22	1	20	1	5	0	26	0	2	0	297	12

=== International ===
As of match played 25 March 2023

Appearances and goals by national team and year
National team	Year	Apps	Goals
Brazil	2019	1	0
Brazil	2021	5	0
Brazil	2022	1	0
Brazil	2023	3	0
Total		10	0

== Honours ==
AC Milan

- Supercoppa Italiana: 2024–25

Flamengo

- FIFA Challenger Cup: 2025
- FIFA Derby of the Americas: 2025
- Copa Libertadores: 2025
- Campeonato Brasileiro Série A: 2025
- Campeonato Carioca: 2026

Brazil U23

- Toulon Tournament: 2019

Brazil

- Copa América runner-up: 2021

Individual

- Toulon Tournament Best XI: 2019
