= Leonardo Jardim =

Portuguese football manager (born 1974)

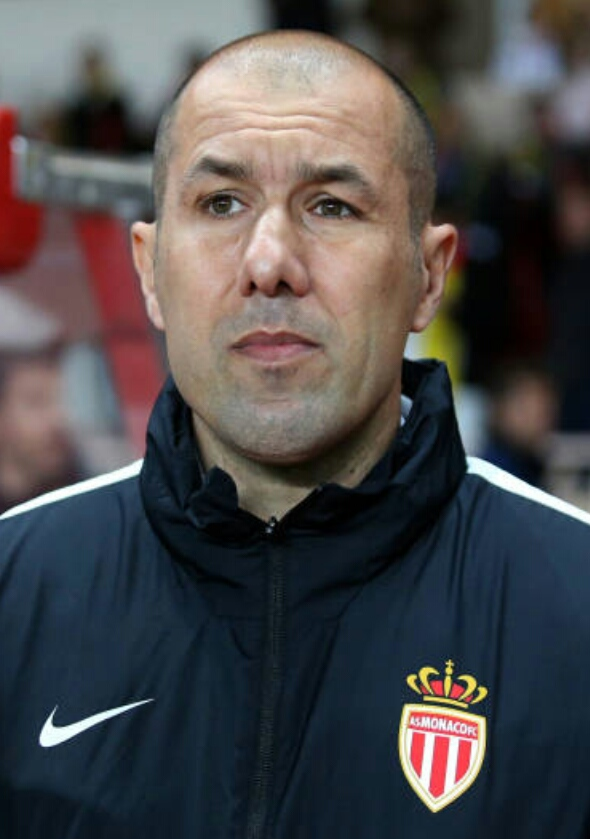
- Jardim with Monaco in 2017

Personal information
- Full name: José Leonardo Nunes Alves Sousa Jardim
- Date of birth: 1 August 1974 (age 52)
- Place of birth: Barcelona, Venezuela

Team information
- Current team: Flamengo (head coach)

Managerial career
- Years: Team
- 1996–1997: Santacruzense (youth)
- 1998–1999: Portosantense (assistant)
- 1999–2000: Câmara de Lobos (assistant)
- 2000–2003: Camacha (assistant)
- 2003–2008: Camacha
- 2008–2009: Chaves
- 2009–2011: Beira-Mar
- 2011–2012: Braga
- 2012–2013: Olympiacos
- 2013–2014: Sporting CP
- 2014–2018: Monaco
- 2019: Monaco
- 2021–2022: Al Hilal
- 2022–2023: Shabab Al Ahli
- 2023–2024: Al-Rayyan
- 2024–2025: Al Ain
- 2025: Cruzeiro
- 2026–: Flamengo

José Leonardo Nunes Alves Sousa Jardim (European Portuguese: [liuˈnaɾðu ʒɐɾˈðĩ]; born 1 August 1974) is a Portuguese football manager, currently in charge of Campeonato Brasileiro Série A club Flamengo.

He started working at the professional level at the age of 35, initially with Camacha and Chaves, before winning promotion to the Primeira Liga with Beira-Mar in 2009–10. He later managed Braga, Olympiacos and Sporting CP.

Jardim joined Monaco in 2014, and led the club to its eighth Ligue 1 championship in 2016–17. After being dismissed in October 2018, he was replaced by Thierry Henry and reappointed in January 2019, before being sacked once again in December.

== Club career ==
=== Early years ===
Born in Barcelona, Venezuela to Portuguese parents who had settled in the country, Jardim returned to Portugal at a very young age, relocating to the island of Madeira. In 2001, aged only 27, he began working as assistant at local club Camacha, and remained three years in that role.

Subsequently, Jardim was promoted to head coach at the third division side, before moving to Chaves in the same division midway through the 2007–08 campaign. He led the northerners to promotion to the Segunda Liga in 2008–09, his only full season.

On 2 June 2009, Jardim was hired by Beira-Mar, and achieved another promotion in 2009–10, this time to the Primeira Liga. He stepped down midway through the 2010–11 season, even though the Aveiro team was performing above most expectations.

=== Braga ===
In May 2011, Jardim replaced Sporting CP-bound Domingos Paciência at the helm of Braga. He led the Minho club to third place in his only season – posting a record of 15 consecutive league wins in the process– but left after a disagreement with the president.

=== Olympiacos ===
On 5 June 2012, Jardim agreed to join Olympiacos of Super League Greece on a two-year contract, replacing Ernesto Valverde. He was controversially relieved of his duties on 19 January 2013, even though the team led the league by ten points.

=== Sporting CP ===
Jardim agreed to return to the country of his parents on 20 May 2013, signing a two-year deal with Sporting. Leading a team full of young players developed in the club's youth academy, he coached the Lisbon team to second place in 2013–14, with 25 points and 18 goals more than the previous season.

=== Monaco ===
On 10 June 2014, Jardim joined Monaco, signing a contract for two years with the option for another. He led the team to third place in Ligue 1 in his first year, and repeated the feat in 2015–16; in between, on 12 May 2015, he agreed to an extension until 2019.

In the 2016–17 campaign, displaying attacking football, particularly by several young players, Monaco won its first national championship in 17 years under Jardim, who also won his first top-flight league title as a manager. The side also reached the semi-finals in both the UEFA Champions League and the Coupe de France, and lost the final of the Coupe de la Ligue to Paris Saint-Germain. In early June 2017, he agreed a new deal until 2020.

On 11 October 2018, following a poor start to the season which included two losses in as many Champions League group stage matches, Jardim was sacked. On 25 January 2019, following the dismissal of Thierry Henry, he was reappointed.

Jardim was again relieved of his duties in late December 2019.

=== Al Hilal ===
On 2 June 2021, Jardim was appointed at Al Hilal of the Saudi Pro League on a one-year deal with an option for a second. On 14 February 2022, in spite of winning the Saudi Super Cup, the AFC Champions League and helping to the conquest of the domestic league alongside his successor Ramón Díaz, he left by mutual consent.

=== Shabab Al Ahli ===
Jardim became manager of Shabab Al Ahli on 8 June 2022, signing a one-year contract. He won the UAE Pro League in his only season, but left due to reported interest from Al-Rayyan.

=== Al-Rayyan ===
On 26 June 2023, Jardim agreed to a two-year deal at Al-Rayyan. He finished second in the Qatar Stars League in his sole campaign, also achieving runner-up honours in the domestic cup.

=== Al Ain ===
Jardim returned to the Emirati top division on 8 November 2024, taking over from the dismissed Hernán Crespo at Al Ain on a contract until the end of the 2025 FIFA Club World Cup. Two months later, however, he was dismissed due to poor results.

=== Cruzeiro ===
Jardim switched clubs and countries again on 4 February 2025, being named head coach of Campeonato Brasileiro Série A's Cruzeiro. He led them to third place in the league, and was knocked out of the Copa do Brasil in the semi-finals.

On 15 December 2025, Cruzeiro announced Jardim's departure; despite being under contract for a further year, he expressed his desire to leave after not wanting to take any other coaching jobs.

=== Flamengo ===
On 5 March 2026, Jardim replaced Filipe Luís at the helm of Flamengo on a deal until December 2027; his predecessor had been fired in spite of a 8–0 rout of Madureira in the Campeonato Carioca. He won the state league three days later, beating Fluminense on penalties. On 21 November, he was crowned national champion with two games left.

== Managerial statistics ==
As of 21 November 2026

Managerial record by team and tenure
Team	Nat	From	To	Record							
Team	Nat	From	To	G	W	D	L	GF	GA	GD	Win %
Camacha	(Portugal)	1 July 2003	14 March 2008	166	73	41	52	250	186	+64	43.98
Chaves	(Portugal)	17 March 2008	2 June 2009	48	28	11	9	78	37	+41	58.33
Beira-Mar	(Portugal)	2 June 2009	28 February 2011	66	25	21	20	87	72	+15	37.88
Braga	(Portugal)	7 June 2011	30 May 2012	46	27	10	9	84	45	+39	58.70
Olympiacos	(Greece)	5 June 2012	19 January 2013	26	20	3	3	55	19	+36	76.92
Sporting CP	(Portugal)	20 May 2013	20 May 2014	35	23	8	4	71	26	+45	65.71
Monaco	(France)	6 June 2014	11 October 2018	233	125	54	54	428	275	+153	53.65
Monaco	(France)	27 January 2019	28 December 2019	37	14	11	12	54	51	+3	37.84
Al Hilal	(Saudi Arabia)	2 June 2021	14 February 2022	26	14	8	4	48	29	+19	53.85
Shabab Al Ahli	(United Arab Emirates)	8 June 2022	1 June 2023	32	19	8	5	61	34	+27	59.38
Al-Rayyan	(Qatar)	26 June 2023	30 June 2024	31	20	3	8	67	38	+29	64.52
Al Ain	(United Arab Emirates)	8 November 2024	4 February 2025	15	5	4	6	28	23	+5	33.33
Cruzeiro	(Brazil)	4 February 2025	15 December 2025	55	26	18	11	76	44	+32	47.27
Flamengo	(Brazil)	5 March 2026	present	48	31	13	4	92	35	+57	64.58
Career total				864	450	213	201	1,479	914	+565	52.08

== Honours ==
Camacha

- Madeira FA Cup: 2003–04

Beira-Mar

- Segunda Liga: 2009–10

Olympiacos

- Super League Greece: 2012–13
- Greek Football Cup: 2012–13

Monaco

- Ligue 1: 2016–17

Al Hilal

- Saudi Pro League: 2021–22
- Saudi Super Cup: 2021
- AFC Champions League: 2021

Shabab Al Ahli

- UAE Pro League: 2022–23

Flamengo

- Campeonato Brasileiro Série A: 2026
- Campeonato Carioca: 2026

Individual

- Ligue 1 Manager of the Year: 2016–17
