= Gonzalo Plata =

Ecuadorian footballer (born 2000)

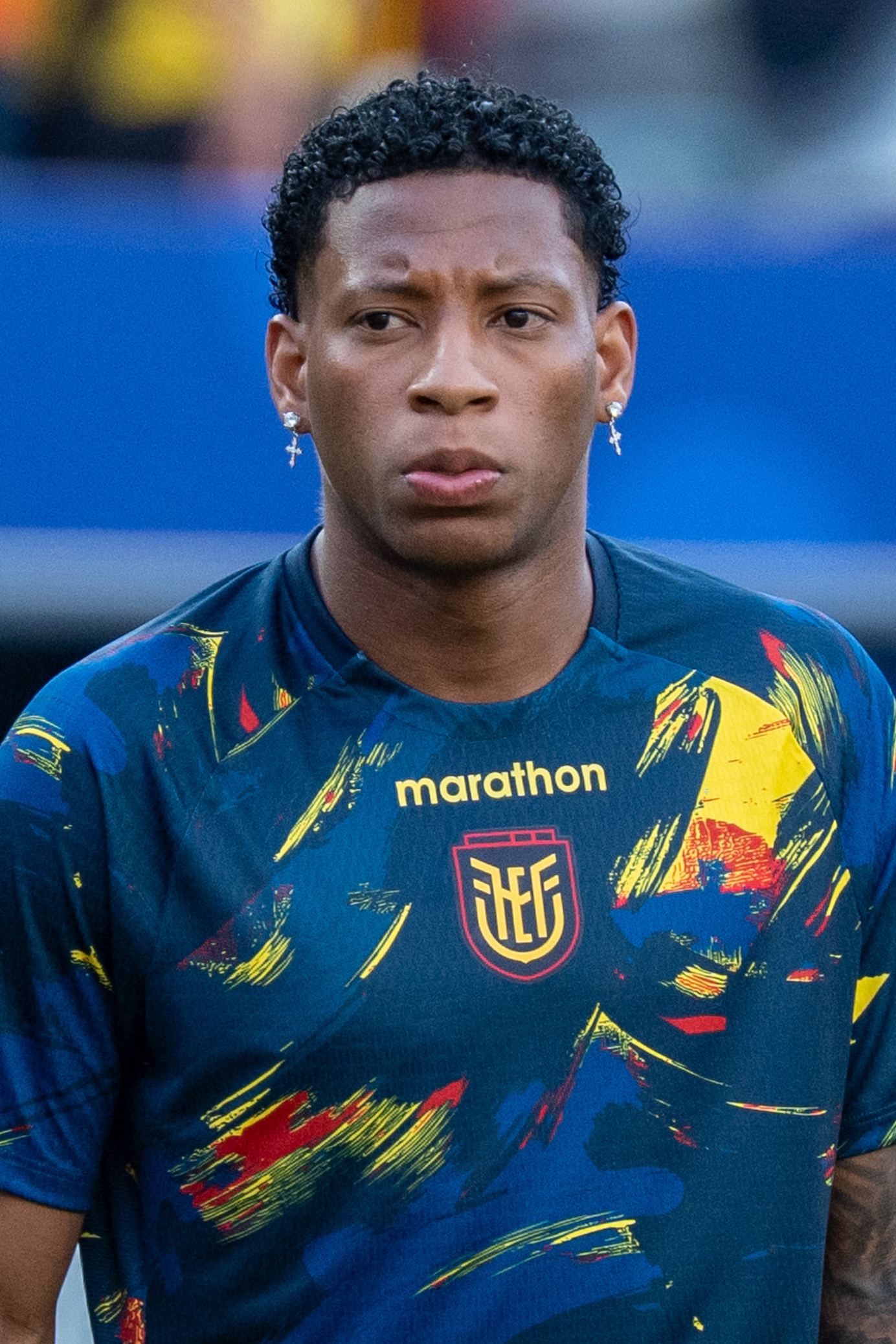
- Plata with Ecuador in 2026

Personal information
- Full name: Gonzalo Jordy Plata Jiménez
- Date of birth: 1 November 2000 (age 26)
- Place of birth: Guayaquil, Ecuador
- Height: 1.78 m (5 ft 10 in)
- Position: Right winger

Team information
- Current team: Flamengo
- Number: 19

Youth career
- 2011–2012: LDU Quito
- 2012–2018: Independiente del Valle

Senior career*
Years	Team	Apps	(Gls)
2018–2019	Independiente del Valle	13	(1)
2019–2022	Sporting CP	30	(3)
2021	Sporting CP B	5	(2)
2021–2022	→ Valladolid (loan)	30	(6)
2022–2023	Valladolid	34	(1)
2023–2024	Al Sadd	21	(8)
2024–	Flamengo	76	(10)

International career^{‡}
2018–2019	Ecuador U20	18	(3)
2019–	Ecuador	54	(9)
Medal record
Men's football
Representing Ecuador
FIFA U-20 World Cup
Third place	2019 Poland
- * Club domestic league appearances and goals as of 21 November 2026 ‡ National team caps and goals as of 16:16, 1 July 2026 (UTC)

Gonzalo Jordy Plata Jiménez (born 1 November 2000) is an Ecuadorian professional footballer who plays as a right winger for Campeonato Brasileiro Série A club Flamengo and the Ecuador national team.

== Club career ==
=== Sporting ===
Plata joined Sporting from Ecuadorean club Independiente del Valle for an undisclosed fee during the 2018–19 winter transfer window. Plata scored his first Primeira Liga goal for Sporting in a 2–0 win over Boavista on 23 February 2020.

On 19 May 2021, Plata scored in Sporting's 5–1 win over Marítimo as the club won their first Primeira Liga title in 19 years.

=== Valladolid ===
On 31 August 2021, Plata joined Spanish Segunda División side Real Valladolid on loan for the 2021–22 season.

On 11 July 2022, Plata was purchased by Valladolid, signing a contract until 2027.

=== Al Sadd ===
On 23 July 2023, Plata joined Qatar Stars League side Al Sadd.

=== Flamengo ===
On 30 August 2024, Plata joined Brazilian side Flamengo. Later that year, on 10 November, he scored the goal that secured the Copa do Brasil trophy for Flamengo by winning 1–0 in the second leg against Atlético Mineiro at Arena MRV.

On August 28, 2026, it was announced that the Russian club Dynamo Moscow had signed Plata for a transfer fee of €10m, however, three days later, the club backed out of the deal, claiming that Plata had failed his medical exams.

== International career ==
Plata was selected in the 28 player Ecuador squad for the 2021 Copa América. Plata was named in the Ecuadorian squad for the 2022 FIFA World Cup.

On 31 May 2026, Plata was selected in the 26-man squad for the 2026 FIFA World Cup. A month later, on 25 June, he netted the winning goal in a 2–1 victory over Germany, securing his country's place in the knockout stage.

== Career statistics ==
=== Club ===
As of match played 21 November 2026

Appearances and goals by club, season and competition
Club	Season	League			National cup		League cup		Continental		Other		Total	
Club	Season	Division	Apps	Goals	Apps	Goals	Apps	Goals	Apps	Goals	Apps	Goals	Apps	Goals
Independiente del Valle	2018	Ecuadorian Serie A	13	1	–		–		–		–		13	1
Sporting CP	2019–20	Primeira Liga	21	2	0	0	1	1	2 (Note: Appearance(s) in UEFA Europa League)	0	–		24	3
Sporting CP	2020–21	Primeira Liga	9	1	2	0	2	0	1	0	–		14	1
Sporting CP	Total		30	3	2	0	3	1	3	0	–		38	4
Sporting CP B	2020–21	Campeonato de Portugal	5	2	–		–		–		–		5	2
Valladolid (loan)	2021–22	Segunda División	30	6	1	0	–		–		–		31	6
Valladolid	2022–23	La Liga	34	1	2	0	–		–		–		36	1
Valladolid	Valladolid total		64	7	3	0	–		–		–		67	7
Al Sadd	2023–24	Qatar Stars League	21	8	4	0	–		5 (Note: Appearances in AFC Champions League)	2	3 (Note: Appearances in Arab Club Champions Cup)	1	33	12
Flamengo	2024	Série A	11	1	4	1	–		2 (Note: Appearances in Copa Libertadores)	0	–		17	2
Flamengo	2025	Série A	28	4	3	0	–		7	0	15 (Note: One appearance in Supercopa do Brasil, eight appearances and one goal in Campeonato Carioca, three appearances in FIFA Club World Cup, three appearances in FIFA Intercontinental Cup)	1	53	5
Flamengo	2026	Série A	23	4	1	0	–		10	0	8 (Note: Six appearances in Campeonato Carioca, two appearances in Supercopa do Brasil)	0	42	4
Flamengo	Total		62	9	8	1	–		19	0	23	1	112	11
Career total			195	30	17	1	3	1	27	2	26	2	268	36

=== International ===
As of match played 30 June 2026

Appearances and goals by national team and year
National team	Year	Apps	Goals
Ecuador	2019	4	1
Ecuador	2020	4	2
Ecuador	2021	14	2
Ecuador	2022	11	0
Ecuador	2023	2	0
Ecuador	2024	6	3
Ecuador	2025	6	0
Ecuador	2026	7	1
Total		54	9

Scores and results list Ecuador's goal tally first.

List of international goals scored by Gonzalo Plata
No.	Date	Venue	Cap	Opponent	Score	Result	Competition
1	10 September 2019	Estadio Alejandro Serrano Aguilar, Cuenca, Ecuador	2	Bolivia	3–0	3–0	Friendly
2	13 October 2020	Estadio Rodrigo Paz Delgado, Quito, Ecuador	6	Uruguay	4–0	4–2	2022 FIFA World Cup qualification
3	17 November 2020	Estadio Rodrigo Paz Delgado, Quito, Ecuador	8	Colombia	5–1	6–1	2022 FIFA World Cup qualification
4	8 June 2021	Estadio Rodrigo Paz Delgado, Quito, Ecuador	10	Peru	1–2	1–2	2022 FIFA World Cup qualification
5	20 June 2021	Estádio Olímpico Nilton Santos, Rio de Janeiro, Brasil	12	Venezuela	2–1	2–2	2021 Copa América
6	21 March 2024	Red Bull Arena, Harrison, United States	36	Guatemala	2–0	2–0	Friendly
7	14 November 2024	Estadio Isidro Romero Carbo, Guayaquil, Ecuador	40	Bolivia	2–0	4–0	2026 FIFA World Cup qualification
8	14 November 2024	Estadio Isidro Romero Carbo, Guayaquil, Ecuador	40	Bolivia	3–0	4–0	2026 FIFA World Cup qualification
9	25 June 2026	MetLife Stadium, East Rutherford, United States	53	Germany	2–1	2–1	2026 FIFA World Cup

== Honours ==
Sporting CP

- Primeira Liga: 2020–21
- Taça da Liga: 2020–21
- Supertaça Cândido de Oliveira: 2021

Flamengo

- FIFA Challenger Cup: 2025
- FIFA Derby of the Americas: 2025
- Copa Libertadores: 2025
- Campeonato Brasileiro Série A: 2025
- Copa do Brasil: 2024
- Supercopa do Brasil: 2025
- Campeonato Carioca: 2025, 2026

Ecuador U20

- South American Youth Championship: 2019

Individual

- South American Youth Championship Team of the Tournament: 2019
- FIFA U20 World Cup Bronze Ball: 2019
