= Patryck Ferreira =

Brazilian footballer

Personal information
- Full name: Patryck Magalhães Ferreira
- Date of birth: 5 September 1998 (age 28)
- Place of birth: Rio de Janeiro, Brazil
- Height: 1.84 m (6 ft 0 in)
- Position: Forward

Team information
- Current team: Mito HollyHock
- Number: 33

Youth career
- 2017: Duque de Caxias
- 2018: Internacional

Senior career*
Years	Team	Apps	(Gls)
2019	Gimhae	6	(0)
2020–2021	União Suzano	14	(9)
2021–2022	Vida	11	(6)
2023	Tacuary	13	(1)
2023	São Cristóvão	12	(5)
2024–2026	Madureira	6	(2)
2024	→ Petrópolis (loan)	4	(1)
2024	→ Brasiliense (loan)	5	(1)
2024	→ São Cristóvão (loan)	0	(0)
2025	→ Ho Chi Minh City FC (loan)	2	(0)
2025	→ Bangu (loan)	14	(3)
2025	→ São Cristóvão (loan)	12	(4)
2026	→ Bangu (loan)	10	(6)
2026–	→ Mito HollyHock (loan)	8	(1)
- * Club domestic league appearances and goals as of 12 August 2026

Patryck Magalhães Ferreira (born 5 September 1998), better known as Patryck Ferreira, is a Brazilian professional footballer who plays as a forward for J1 League club Mito HollyHock, on loan from Madureira.

== Career ==
Having played in the youth ranks of Duque de Caxias and Internacional, Ferreira first played professionally outside of Brazil, for Gimhae in South Korea. He also played for CDS Vida and Club Tacuary, returning to Brazil to play for São Cristóvão FR in the lower divisions of Rio de Janeiro. In 2026, he gained prominence by being the top scorer in the Carioca Championship alongside Pedro, playing for Bangu AC. His good performance led to a transfer from Madureira, which held his rights, to Mito HollyHock in Japan.

== Honours ==
União Suzano

- Campeonato Paulista Série A4: 2021

São Cristóvão

- Campeonato Carioca Série B2: 2023

Bangu

- Campeonato Carioca Série A2: 2025

Individual

- 2026 Campeonato Carioca top scorer: 6 goals
