= Joaquín Freitas =

Argentine footballer (born 2006)

- Freitas in 2026.

Personal information
- Date of birth: 2 December 2006 (age 19)
- Place of birth: San Fernando, Buenos Aires Province, Argentina
- Height: 1.77 m (5 ft 9 1/2 in)
- Position: Forward

Team information
- Current team: Flamengo
- Number: 30

Youth career
- 2022–2023: Acassuso
- 2024–2025: River Plate

Senior career*
Years	Team	Apps	(Gls)
2023	Acassuso	5	(0)
2025–2026	River Plate	21	(1)
2026–	Flamengo	3	(0)

International career^{‡}
2026–	Argentina	1	(0)
- * Club domestic league appearances and goals as of 17 October 2026 ‡ National team caps and goals as of 6 June 2026

Joaquín Freitas (born 2 December 2006) is an Argentine professional association football player who plays as a forward for the Campeonato Brasileiro Série A club Flamengo and the Argentina national team.

== Club career ==
=== Acassuso ===
Freitas completed his initial training at Acassuso, an institution based in the town of the same name in Greater Buenos Aires. In 2022, while playing in the club's youth divisions, he became the top scorer in the youth tournament of the seventh division of the Argentine Football Association with 26 goals, an achievement that earned him a call-up to the Argentina national under-20 team coached by Claudio Gugnali.

On 29 May 2023, at just 16 years old, Freitas made his official debut with the Acassuso senior team under coach Alejandro Friedrich in the sixteenth round of the Primera B against Deportivo Armenio, entering at the 25th minute of the second half.

=== River Plate ===
In January 2024, Club Atlético River Plate showed interest in the young striker and signed him, initially acquiring 75% of his transfer rights. Freitas first joined the club's Fourth Division and quickly rose to the Reserve squad, where he made his official debut on 11 October 2024.

During 2025, under the management of Marcelo Escudero, Freitas participated in preseason training with the reserve squad and formed a starting attacking partnership with Bautista Dadín. He scored his first goal in April against San Martín (SJ) and maintained a scoring streak that included a goal in the Superclásico against Boca Juniors in May. He finished the season with 9 goals and 3 assists in 31 matches.

On 16 November 2025, Freitas made his first division debut against Vélez Sarsfield under the management of Marcelo Gallardo. At the end of the year, he signed his first professional contract, running until 31 December 2028, with a release clause set at $100 million.

By 2026, without having completed preseason with the first team, Freitas scored a brace against Talleres de Córdoba in the first match of the reserve tournament. Due to the lackluster performance of the first team's forwards, he was called up again and eventually became a regular member of the squad. He played a decisive role against Ciudad de Bolívar in the Copa Argentina, coming on in the second half and drawing the penalty that Juan Fernando Quintero converted to secure the victory and passage to the next round.

Freitas scored his first goal in the first division against Banfield, the third goal for the home team in their 3–1 victory. The match also served as Marcelo Gallardo's farewell as the club's historic manager. The goal was set up by an assist from Tomás Galván after a great team play.

In April 2026, an agreement was reached to purchase 100% of Freitas' player rights. The agreement included performance-based bonuses and a 25% sell-on clause for Acassuso in any future transfer, capped at 1 million dollars.

=== Flamengo ===
On 1 September 2026, Campeonato Brasileiro Série A side Flamengo announced the signing of Freitas on a five-year contract.

== International career ==
Freitas made his full international debut for Argentina on 6 June 2026, in a friendly against Honduras.

== Career statistics ==
=== Club ===
As of 1 September 2026

Club	Season	League			Cup		Continental		Other		Total	
Club	Season	Division	Apps	Goals	Apps	Goals	Apps	Goals	Apps	Goals	Apps	Goals
Acassuso	2023	Primera B Metropolitana	5	0	—		—		—		5	0
River Plate	2025	Liga Profesional	1	0	0	0	—		—		1	0
River Plate	2026	Liga Profesional	20	1	2	0	7 (Note: Appearance(s) in Copa Sudamericana)	0	—		29	1
River Plate	Total		21	1	2	0	7	0	—		30	1
Flamengo	2026	Série A	0	0	—		0	0	—		0	0
Career total			26	1	2	0	7	0	—		35	1

=== International ===
As of 1 September 2026

Appearances and goals by national team and year
National team	Year	Apps	Goals
Argentina	2026	1	0
Total		1	0

== Honours ==
Flamengo

- Campeonato Brasileiro Série A: 2026
