= Samuel Lino =

Brazilian footballer (born 1999)

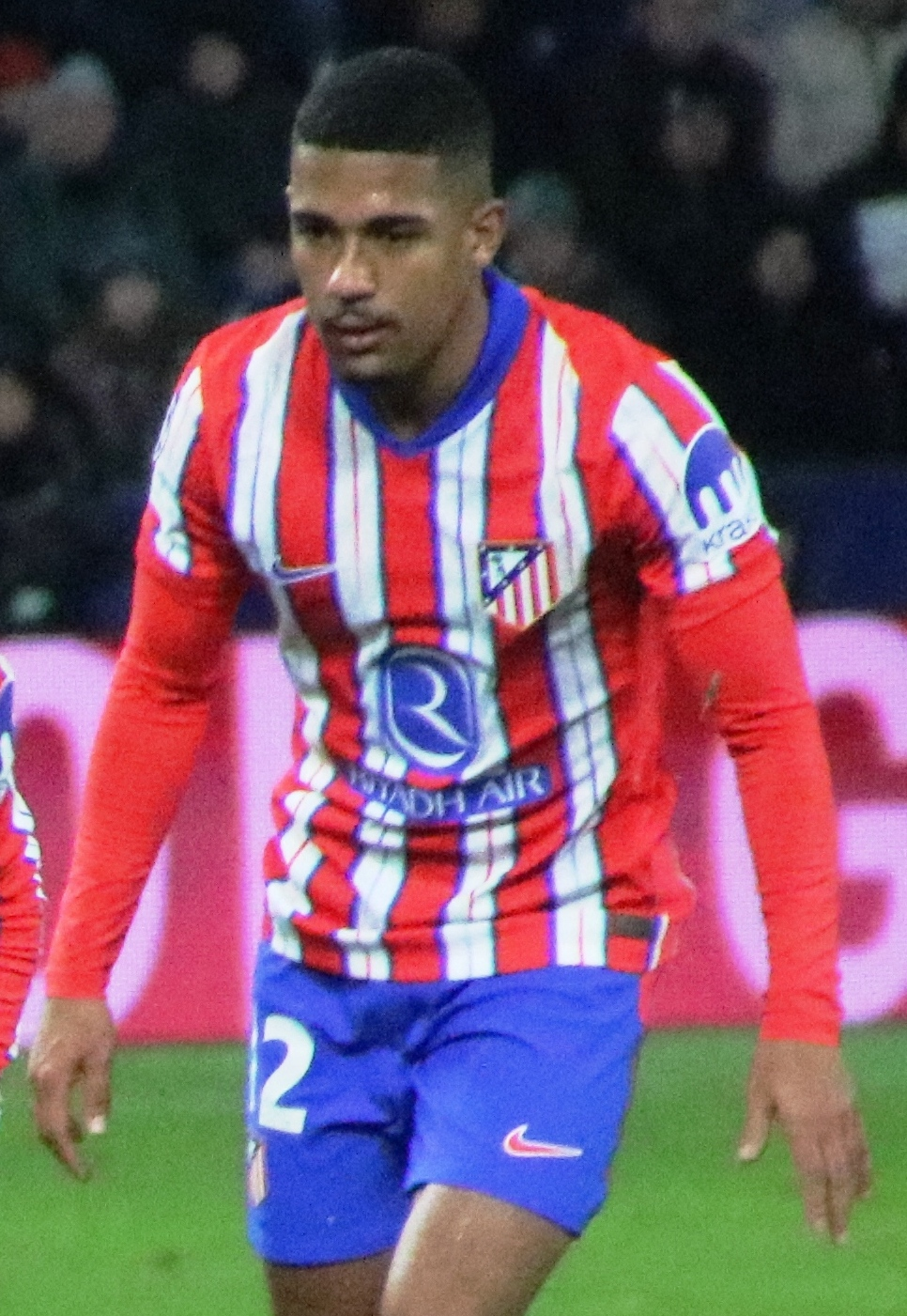
- Lino playing for Atlético Madrid in 2025

Personal information
- Full name: Samuel Dias Lino
- Date of birth: 23 December 1999 (age 26)
- Place of birth: Santo André, São Paulo, Brazil
- Height: 1.77 m (5 ft 10 in)
- Positions: Left winger; wing-back

Team information
- Current team: Flamengo
- Number: 16

Youth career
- 2016–2019: São Bernardo
- 2017–2018: → Flamengo (loan)

Senior career*
Years	Team	Apps	(Gls)
2017–2019	São Bernardo	6	(0)
2019–2022	Gil Vicente	87	(23)
2022–2025	Atlético Madrid	65	(7)
2022–2023	→ Valencia (loan)	38	(6)
2025–	Flamengo	63	(19)

International career^{‡}
2025–	Brazil	4	(2)
- * Club domestic league appearances and goals as of 21 November 2026 (UTC) ‡ National team caps and goals as of 3 October 2026 (UTC)

Samuel Dias Lino (Brazilian Portuguese: [sɐ̃muˈɛw ˈlĩnu]; born 23 December 1999) is a Brazilian professional footballer who plays as a left winger or wing-back for Campeonato Brasileiro Série A club Flamengo and the Brazil national team.

== Club career ==
=== Early career ===
Born in Santo André but raised in São Bernardo do Campo, São Paulo, Lino played futsal for a local side before joining São Bernardo FC's youth setup in 2016. He made his first team debut with the club on 21 May 2017, coming on as a second-half substitute in a 1–0 Série D away win over Novo Hamburgo.

On 28 June 2017, Lino agreed to a loan deal with Flamengo until October 2018, and returned to the youth setup. His loan was cut short in July 2018, and he was assigned to the first team of São Bernardo for the year's Copa Paulista. He scored his first senior goal on 25 August, netting his team's third in a 3–1 home win over Santos B.

=== Gil Vicente ===
On 30 June 2019, Lino moved abroad and signed for Gil Vicente in the Portuguese Primeira Liga. He made his professional debut with the club in a 3-2 Taça da Liga win over Desportivo Aves on 3 August.

Lino scored his first professional goal on 2 February 2020, but in a 5–1 away loss against Moreirense. Despite scoring only twice and having only five league starts during the season, he still renewed his contract until 2024 on 29 July 2020, and subsequently started to feature more regularly in his second year, netting eleven goals overall.

Lino scored 12 goals in the 2021–22 Primeira Liga (which also included a brace in a 3–0 home win over Tondela on 8 May 2022), helping Gil Vicente to a fifth position overall and subsequent a historical qualification to the 2022–23 UEFA Europa Conference League.

=== Atlético Madrid ===
On 8 July 2022, Lino joined Spanish side Atlético Madrid on a five-year deal.

==== Valencia (loan) and return to Atlético ====
On 28 July 2022, Lino joined Valencia on a season-long loan. Later that year, on 4 September, he scored his first La Liga goal in a 5–1 victory over Getafe. He concluded his loan move as his club's top scorer in La Liga with six goals along with Justin Kluivert.

On 7 November 2023, Lino scored his first UEFA Champions League goal for Atlético and provided two assists in a 6–0 victory over Celtic.

=== Flamengo ===
On 29 July 2025, Lino returned to Brazil, transferring to Flamengo for €22m transfer fee, becoming the most expensive transfer in the club's history, signing until December 2029. A month later, on 25 August, he scored his first goals by netting a brace in an 8–0 victory over Vitória. Later that year, on 3 December, he scored the only goal in a 1–0 victory over Ceará, securing the Campeonato Brasileiro Série A title for his club.

== International career ==
Lino made his international debut for Brazil on 9 September 2025 in a 1–0 away defeat against Bolivia during the 2026 FIFA World Cup qualification.

== Career statistics ==
=== Club ===
As of match played 21 November 2026

Appearances and goals by club, season and competition
Club	Season	League			State league (Note: Includes Campeonato Paulista Série A2, Campeonato Carioca)		National cup (Note: Includes Taça de Portugal, Copa del Rey, Copa do Brasil)		League cup (Note: Includes Taça da Liga)		Continental		Other		Total	
Club	Season	Division	Apps	Goals	Apps	Goals	Apps	Goals	Apps	Goals	Apps	Goals	Apps	Goals	Apps	Goals
São Bernardo	2017	Série D	1	0	0	0	—		—		—		—		1	0
São Bernardo	2018	Paulista A2	—		0	0	—		—		—		17 (Note: Appearances in Copa Paulista)	4	17	4
São Bernardo	2019	Paulista A2	—		5	0	—		—		—		—		5	0
São Bernardo	Total		1	0	5	0	—		—		—		17	4	23	4
Gil Vicente	2019–20	Primeira Liga	20	2	—		2	0	4	0	—		—		26	2
Gil Vicente	2020–21	Primeira Liga	33	9	—		4	2	0	0	—		—		37	11
Gil Vicente	2021–22	Primeira Liga	34	12	—		2	2	2	0	—		—		38	14
Gil Vicente	Total		87	23	—		8	4	6	0	—		—		101	27
Valencia (loan)	2022–23	La Liga	38	6	—		2	1	—		—		1 (Note: Appearance in Supercopa de España)	1	41	8
Atlético Madrid	2023–24	La Liga	34	4	—		4	1	—		7 (Note: Appearances in UEFA Champions League)	3	1	0	46	8
Atlético Madrid	2024–25	La Liga	31	3	—		4	1	—		10	0	2 (Note: Appearances in FIFA Club World Cup)	0	47	4
Atlético Madrid	Total		65	7	—		8	2	—		17	3	3	0	93	12
Flamengo	2025	Série A	21	4	—		2	0	—		6 (Note: Appearances in Copa Libertadores)	0	2 (Note: Appearances in FIFA Intercontinental Cup)	0	31	4
Flamengo	2026	Série A	35	13	7	2	2	0	—		10	1	2 (Note: Appearances in Recopa Sudamericana)	0	56	16
Flamengo	Total		56	17	7	2	4	0	—		16	1	4	0	87	20
Career total			247	53	12	2	22	7	6	0	33	4	25	5	345	71

=== International ===
As of match played 3 October 2026

Appearances and goals by national team and year
National team	Year	Apps	Goals
Brazil	2025	1	0
Brazil	2026	3	2
Total		4	2

As of match played 3 October 2026
Scores and results list Brazil's goal tally first, score column indicates score after each Lino goal.

List of international goals scored by Samuel Lino
No.	Date	Venue	Cap	Opponent	Score	Result	Competition
1	3 October 2026	Salt Lake Stadium, Kolkata, India	4	India	3–0	4–0	Friendly
2	3 October 2026	Salt Lake Stadium, Kolkata, India	4	India	4–0	4–0	Friendly

== Honours ==
Flamengo Youth

- Copa São Paulo de Futebol Júnior: 2018

Flamengo

- FIFA Challenger Cup: 2025
- FIFA Derby of the Americas: 2025
- Copa Libertadores: 2025
- Campeonato Brasileiro Série A: 2025, 2026
- Campeonato Carioca: 2026
