= 2024 Qatar Cup =

Tournament details
- Country: Qatar
- Dates: 1 – 4 May 2024
- Teams: 4

Final positions
- Champions: Al-Wakrah
- Runners-up: Al-Rayyan

Tournament statistics
- Matches played: 3
- Goals scored: 8 (2.67 per match)

The 2024 Qatar Cup, more widely known as the Crown Prince Cup, was the twentieth edition of the Qatar Cup. It is played from May 1, 2024 – May 4, 2024. The cup is contested by the top four finishers of the 2023–24 Qatar Stars League.

== Participants ==
Team	2023–24 League Position
Al Sadd	Champions
Al-Rayyan	Runners-up
Al-Gharafa	Third
Al-Wakrah	Fourth

== Matches ==
=== Semi-finals ===
1 May 2024
15:15 AST

Al-Sadd	2–2 (a.e.t.)	Al-Wakrah
Afif 43'; Plata 27'	Report	Assal 73'; Dala 90+3'
Penalties
Al-Haydos (penalty scored); Uribe (penalty scored); Plata (penalty scored); Khoukhi (penalty missed); Afif (penalty scored); Waad (penalty missed)	4–5	(penalty missed) Mendes; (penalty scored) Benyettou; (penalty scored) Sainsbury; (penalty scored) Fathy; (penalty scored) Boussafi; (penalty scored) Ali

Ahmad bin Ali Stadium, Al Rayyan
Referee: Khamis Al-Marri
1 May 2024
18:00 AST

Al-Gharafa	1–2	Al-Rayyan
Sano 62'	Report	Bencharki 78', 87'

Khalifa International Stadium, Al Rayyan
Referee: Abdulhadi Al Ruaile

== Finals ==
4 May 2024
17:00 AST

Al-Wakrah	1–0	Al-Rayyan
Al Yazidi 80'	Report

Abdullah bin Khalifa Stadium, Doha
Referee: Mohammed Al-Shammari
