= Léo Nannetti =

Brazilian footballer

Personal information
- Full name: Leonardo Nannetti Lopes
- Date of birth: 21 August 2007 (age 19)
- Place of birth: Rio de Janeiro, Brazil
- Height: 1.96 m (6 ft 5 in)
- Position: Goalkeeper

Team information
- Current team: Flamengo
- Number: 58

Youth career
- 2016–: Flamengo

Senior career*
Years	Team	Apps	(Gls)
2026–	Flamengo	3	(0)

International career
2024	Brazil U17		
- * Club domestic league appearances and goals as of 7 June 2026

Leonardo Nannetti Lopes (born 21 August 2007), mostly known as Léo Nannetti, is a Brazilian professional footballer who plays as a goalkeeper for Flamengo.

== Club career ==
Nannetti arrived at Flamengo in 2016 and went through the entire player development process in the club's youth categories. In 2025, he stood out by winning the U20 Intercontinental Cup, being promoted to the main team in 2026, which played in the first matches of the Campeonato Carioca.

== International career ==
In September 2025, Nannetti was called up by coach Carlo Ancelotti as the fourth goalkeeper, with the role of assisting in the training of the Brazil national team. In May 2026, the player was again required to perform the role, traveling with the squad called up for the 2026 FIFA World Cup.

== Honours ==
Flamengo

- Campeonato Carioca: 2026

Flamengo U20

- Under-20 Intercontinental Cup: 2025
- U-20 Copa Libertadores: 2025

Brazil U17

- Cascais Luso Cup: 2024
