= 2026 Fluminense FC season =

Fluminense FC
2026 season
- President: Mattheus Montenegro
- Manager: Luis Zubeldía (until 13 August); Marcão (caretaker, from 13 August)
- Stadium: Maracanã
- Campeonato Brasileiro Série A: 4th
- Copa do Brasil: Round of 16
- Copa Libertadores: Semi-finals
- Top goalscorer: League: John Kennedy (9); All: John Kennedy (14)
- All statistics correct as of 19 November 2026.

The 2026 season is the 124th season in the history of Fluminense Football Club, wherein it competes in the Campeonato Brasileiro Série A, the Campeonato Carioca, the Copa do Brasil, and the Copa Libertadores. The season began on 14 January.

== Transfers ==
=== In ===
| Pos. | Player | Transferred from | Fee | Date | Source |
|---|---|---|---|---|---|
| DF | (Brazil) Jemmes | (Brazil) Mirassol | ~$4,000,000 | 1 January 2026 | |
| MF | (Brazil) Nonato | (Brazil) Santos | Undisclosed (Note: Loan made permanent) | 1 January 2026 | |
| DF | (Brazil) Guilherme Arana | (Brazil) Atlético Mineiro | €5,000,000 | 2 January 2026 | |
| MF | (Venezuela) Jefferson Savarino | (Brazil) Botafogo | ~$7,500,000 | 22 January 2026 | |
| FW | (Argentina) Rodrigo Castillo | (Argentina) Lanús | ~$10,000,000 | 3 March 2026 | |
| DF | (Colombia) Julián Millán | (Uruguay) Nacional | $4,000,000 | 3 March 2026 | |
| FW | (Brazil) Hulk | (Brazil) Atlético Mineiro | Free | 1 July 2026 | |
| DF | (Brazil) Thiago Silva | (Portugal) FC Porto | Free | 1 July 2026 | |

== Friendlies ==
| 9 July 2026 | Fluminense (Rio de Janeiro (state)) | 6–1 | (Rio de Janeiro (state)) Nova Iguaçu |

| 12 July 2026 | Fluminense (Rio de Janeiro (state)) | 2–0 | Bahia |

== Competitions ==
=== Overall record ===
| Competition | First match | Last match | Starting round | Final position | Record | | | | | | | |
| Competition | First match | Last match | Starting round | Final position | Pld | W | D | L | GF | GA | GD | Win % |
|---|---|---|---|---|---|---|---|---|---|---|---|---|
| Campeonato Brasileiro Série A | 28 January 2026 | | Matchday 1 | | 35 | 17 | 9 | 9 | 56 | 42 | +14 | 48.57 |
| Campeonato Carioca | 14 January 2026 | 8 March 2026 | League Phase | Runner-up | 10 | 7 | 2 | 1 | 14 | 7 | +7 | 70.00 |
| Copa do Brasil | 23 April 2026 | 6 August 2026 | Fifth Round | Round of 16 | 4 | 1 | 2 | 1 | 3 | 4 | −1 | 25.00 |
| Copa Libertadores | 7 April 2026 | 21 October 2026 | Group Stage | Semi-finals | 12 | 4 | 4 | 4 | 12 | 11 | +1 | 33.33 |
| Total | | | | | 61 | 29 | 17 | 15 | 85 | 64 | +21 | 47.54 |

Last updated: 19 November 2026
Source: Competitions

=== Campeonato Carioca ===
| 14 January 2026 | Fluminense | 2–1 | Madureira |

| 17 January 2026 | Boavista | 1–0 | Fluminense |

| 23 January 2026 | Nova Iguaçu | 2–3 | Fluminense |

| 25 January 2026 | Fluminense | 2–1 | Flamengo |

| 2 February 2026 | Botafogo | 0–1 | Fluminense |

| 9 February 2026 | Fluminense | 1–0 | Maricá |

| 16 February 2026 | Fluminense | 3–1 | Bangu |

| 22 February 2026 | Vasco da Gama | 0–1 | Fluminense |

| 1 March 2026 | Fluminense | 1–1 | Vasco da Gama |

| 8 March 2026 | Fluminense | 0–0 | Flamengo |

=== Campeonato Brasileiro Série A ===
| Pos | Team | Pld | W | D | L | GF | GA | GD | Pts | Qualification or relegation |
|---|---|---|---|---|---|---|---|---|---|---|
| 2 | Palmeiras (Q) | 35 | 21 | 10 | 4 | 63 | 25 | +38 | 73 | Qualification for Copa Libertadores group stage |
| 3 | Cruzeiro (Q) | 35 | 19 | 6 | 10 | 57 | 49 | +8 | 63 | Qualification for Copa Libertadores group stage |
| 4 | Fluminense (T) | 35 | 17 | 9 | 9 | 56 | 42 | +14 | 60 | Qualification for Copa Libertadores group stage |
| 5 | Athletico Paranaense (X) | 35 | 15 | 9 | 11 | 52 | 45 | +7 | 54 | Qualification for Copa Libertadores second stage (Note: Since Palmeiras, who qualified for the Copa Libertadores group stage on league performance, reached the 2026 Copa do Brasil final, the Copa Libertadores second stage berth allocated to the 2026 Copa do Brasil runners-up was passed to the Série A's highest-placed team not already qualified.) |
| 6 | Bahia (X) | 35 | 14 | 12 | 9 | 50 | 45 | +5 | 54 | Qualification for Copa Libertadores second stage |

Updated to match(es) played on 19 November 2026. Source: CBF
Rules for classification: 1) points; 2) wins; 3) goal difference; 4) goals scored; 5) head-to-head results (only between two teams); 6) fewest red cards; 7) fewest yellow cards; 8) drawing of lots.
(Q) Qualified for the phase indicated; (T) Qualified, but not yet for the particular phase indicated; (X) Assured of Copa Sudamericana, but may still qualify for Copa Libertadores

==== Results summary ====
| Overall | | | | | | | | Home | | | | | | Away | | | | | |
| Pld | W | D | L | GF | GA | GD | Pts | W | D | L | GF | GA | GD | W | D | L | GF | GA | GD |
|---|---|---|---|---|---|---|---|---|---|---|---|---|---|---|---|---|---|---|---|
| 35 | 17 | 9 | 9 | 56 | 42 | +14 | 60 | 12 | 3 | 2 | 31 | 17 | +14 | 5 | 6 | 7 | 25 | 25 | 0 |

Last updated: 19 November 2026.

==== Results by round ====
| Round | 1 | 2 | 3 | 4 | 5 | 6 | 7 | 8 | 9 | 10 | 11 | 12 | 13 | 14 | 15 | 16 | 17 | 18 | 19 | 20 | 21 | 22 | 23 |
|---|---|---|---|---|---|---|---|---|---|---|---|---|---|---|---|---|---|---|---|---|---|---|---|
| Ground | H | A | H | A | A | H | A | H | H | A | H | A | H | A | H | H | A | A | H | A | H | A | H |
| Result | W | D | W | L | W | W | L | W | W | D | L | W | W | L | D | W | L | D | D | D | D | D | W |
| Position | 4 | 5 | 3 | 5 | 5 | 4 | 6 | 5 | 3 | 3 | 5 | 3 | 3 | 3 | 3 | 3 | 3 | 3 | 4 | 4 | 4 | | |

Updated to match(es) played on 15 August 2026. Source:
A = Away; H = Home; W = Win; D = Draw; L = Loss

==== Matches ====
| 28 January 2026 1 | Fluminense | 2–1 | Grêmio |

| 5 February 2026 2 | Bahia | 1–1 | Fluminense |

| 12 February 2026 3 | Fluminense | 1–0 | Botafogo |

| 26 February 2026 4 | Palmeiras | 2–1 | Fluminense |

| 12 March 2026 5 | Remo | 0–2 | Fluminense |

| 15 March 2026 6 | Fluminense | 3–2 | Athletico Paranaense |

| 19 March 2026 7 | Vasco da Gama | 3–2 | Fluminense |

| 21 March 2026 8 | Fluminense | 1–0 | Atlético Mineiro |

| 2 April 2026 9 | Fluminense | 3–1 | Corinthians |

| 5 April 2026 10 | Coritiba | 1–1 | Fluminense |

| 12 April 2026 11 | Fluminense | 1–2 | Flamengo |

| 19 April 2026 12 | Santos | 2–3 | Fluminense |

| 27 April 2026 13 | Fluminense | 2–1 | Chapecoense |

| 3 May 2026 14 | Internacional | 2–0 | Fluminense |

| 9 May 2026 15 | Fluminense | 2–2 | Vitória |

| 17 May 2026 16 | Fluminense | 2–1 | São Paulo |

| 24 May 2026 17 | Mirassol | 1–0 | Fluminense |

| 1 June 2026 18 | Cruzeiro | 1–1 | Fluminense |

| 18 July 2026 19 | Fluminense | 1–1 | Red Bull Bragantino |

| 26 July 2026 20 | Grêmio | 1–1 | Fluminense |

| 30 July 2026 21 | Fluminense | 0–0 | Bahia | Rio de Janeiro |
| | | | | Stadium: Maracanã; Referee: Raphael Claus |

| 9 August 2026 22 | Botafogo | 1–1 | Fluminense | Rio de Janeiro |
| | | | | Stadium: Estádio Nilton Santos; Referee: Bruno Arleu de Araújo |

| 15 August 2026 23 | Fluminense | 3–2 | Palmeiras | Rio de Janeiro |
| 16:30 | Hulk 42'; Guga (yellow card) 61'; Canobbio (yellow card) 63'; Acosta (yellow card) 78'; Serna 85'; Martinelli (yellow card) 86'; Cano 90+2' | | Gómez 10', (yellow card) 90+5'; Piquerez (yellow card) 34'; Gabriel (yellow card) 73'; Maurício 82' | Stadium: Maracanã; Referee: Anderson Daronco |

| 22 August 2026 24 | Fluminense | 2–1 | Remo | Rio de Janeiro |
| 16:00 | | | | Stadium: Maracanã |

| 30 August 2026 25 | Athletico Paranaense | 3–3 | Fluminense | Curitiba |
| 11:00 |

| 5 September 2026 26 | Fluminense | 1–0 | Vasco da Gama | Rio de Janeiro |
| 21:00 |

| 12 September 2026 27 | Atlético Mineiro | 3–1 | Fluminense | Belo Horizonte |
| 16:00 |

| 20 September 2026 28 | Corinthians | 1–3 | Fluminense | São Paulo |
| 16:00 |

| 8 October 2026 29 | Fluminense | 4–0 | Coritiba | Rio de Janeiro |
| 21:30 |

| 11 October 2026 30 | Flamengo | 1–0 | Fluminense | Rio de Janeiro |
| 17:30 |

| 18 October 2026 31 | Fluminense | 1–2 | Santos | Rio de Janeiro |
| 16:00 |

| 24 October 2026 32 | Chapecoense | 2–1 | Fluminense | Chapecó |
| 19:30 |

| 28 October 2026 33 | Fluminense | 2–1 | Internacional | Rio de Janeiro |
| 19:30 |

| 6 November 2026 34 | Vitória | 0–3 | Fluminense | Salvador |
| 20:00 |

| 19 November 2026 35 | São Paulo | 0–1 | Fluminense | São Paulo |
| 21:30 |

=== Copa do Brasil ===
==== Fifth round ====
| 24 April 2026 First leg | Operário Ferroviário (Paraná (state)) | 0–0 | (Rio de Janeiro (state)) Fluminense |

| 13 May 2026 Second leg | Fluminense (Rio de Janeiro (state)) | 2–1 (2–1 agg.) | (Paraná (state)) Operário Ferroviário |

==== Round of 16 ====
| 1 August 2026 First leg | Vasco da Gama (Rio de Janeiro (state)) | 0–0 | (Rio de Janeiro (state)) Fluminense |

| 6 August 2026 Second leg | Fluminense (Rio de Janeiro (state)) | 1–3 (1–3 agg.) | (Rio de Janeiro (state)) Vasco da Gama |

=== Copa Libertadores ===
==== Group stage ====
Group C

| Pos | Team | Pld | W | D | L | GF | GA | GD | Pts | Qualification |
|---|---|---|---|---|---|---|---|---|---|---|
| 1 | (Argentina) Independiente Rivadavia | 6 | 5 | 1 | 0 | 15 | 6 | +9 | 16 | Advance to round of 16 |
| 2 | (Brazil) Fluminense | 6 | 2 | 2 | 2 | 7 | 7 | 0 | 8 | Advance to round of 16 |
| 3 | (Bolivia) Bolívar | 6 | 1 | 2 | 3 | 6 | 8 | −2 | 5 | Transfer to Copa Sudamericana |
| 4 | (Venezuela) Deportivo La Guaira | 6 | 0 | 3 | 3 | 6 | 13 | −7 | 3 | |

Source: CONMEBOL
Rules for classification: 1) Points; 2) Head-to-head points; 3) Head-to-head goal difference; 4) Head-to-head goals scored; 5) Goal difference; 6) Goals scored; 7) Red cards; 8) Yellow cards; 9) Drawing of lots.

| 8 April 2026 | Deportivo La Guaira (Venezuela) | 0–0 | (Brazil) Fluminense |

| 16 April 2026 | Fluminense (Brazil) | 1–2 | (Argentina) Independiente Rivadavia |

| 1 May 2026 | Bolívar (Bolivia) | 2–0 | (Brazil) Fluminense |

| 7 May 2026 | Independiente Rivadavia (Argentina) | 1–1 | (Brazil) Fluminense |

| 20 May 2026 | Fluminense (Brazil) | 2–1 | (Bolivia) Bolívar |

| 28 May 2026 | Fluminense (Brazil) | 3–1 | (Venezuela) Deportivo La Guaira |

==== Final stages ====
===== Round of 16 =====
| 12 August 2026 First leg | Fluminense (Brazil) | 0–0 | (Argentina) Independiente Rivadavia | Rio de Janeiro |
| 19:00 UTC−3 | Ignácio (yellow card) 45'; Nonato (yellow card) 70' | | Costa (yellow card) 17' | Stadium: Maracanã Stadium; Referee: Cristian Garay (Chile) |

| 18 August 2026 Second leg | Independiente Rivadavia (Argentina) | 1–1 (1–1 agg.) (4–5 p) | (Brazil) Fluminense | Mendoza, Argentina |
| 19:00 UTC−3 | Studer (yellow card) 25'; Bucca (yellow card) 53'; Arce (yellow card) 64', (goal) 90+7' (pen.) | | Hércules (yellow card) 12'; Canobbio (yellow card) 38' (yellow-red card) 57'; Hulk (yellow card) 60'; Soteldo (yellow card) 60'; Serna 76'; Castillo (yellow card) 90+10' | Stadium: Estadio Bautista Gargantini; Referee: Andrés Rojas (Colombia) |

==== Quarter-finals ====
| 8 September 2026 First leg | Fluminense (Brazil) | 2–0 | (Argentina) Platense |

| 15 September 2026 Second leg | Platense (Argentina) | 2–1 | (Brazil) Fluminense |
