= Rayan Lucas =

Brazilian footballer (born 2005)

Personal information
- Full name: Rayan Lucas Marques de Souza
- Date of birth: 3 January 2005 (age 21)
- Place of birth: Rio de Janeiro, Brazil
- Height: 1.85 m (6 ft 1 in)
- Position: Midfielder

Team information
- Current team: Alverca
- Number: 35

Youth career
- –2025: Flamengo

Senior career*
Years	Team	Apps	(Gls)
2023–2026	Flamengo	8	(0)
2025–2026	→ Sporting CP B (loan)	22	(0)
2026–	Alverca	4	(0)

International career^{‡}
2024	Brazil U20	4	(1)
- * Club domestic league appearances and goals as of 5 September 2026 ‡ National team caps and goals as of 00:28, 2 December 2025 (UTC)

Rayan Lucas Marques de Souza (born 3 January 2005) is a Brazilian professional footballer who plays as a midfielder for Primeira Liga club Alverca.

== Club career ==
As a youth player, Lucas joined the youth academy of Brazilian side Flamengo at the age of eleven and was promoted to the club's senior team in 2023.

=== Sporting CP (loan) ===
Ahead of the 2025–26 season, he was sent on loan to Portuguese side Sporting, initially integrating the club's reserve team, which had recently been promoted to Liga Portugal 2. His only appearance for the senior team came in October in a Taça da Liga game against Alverca.

=== Alverca ===
On 8 August 2026, Rayan Lucas returned to Portugal and signed with Alverca in the top tier.

== International career ==
Lucas is a Brazil youth international. On 5 September 2024, he debuted for the Brazil national under-20 football team during a 2–1 home friendly win over the Mexico national under-20 football team.

== Style of play ==
Lucas plays as a midfielder and is right-footed. Brazilian news website Globo Esporte wrote in 2024 that he is a "classic number 5—with good passing, technical ability, and immense physical strength".
