= 2026 Campeonato Carioca =

Campeonato Carioca
- Season: 2026
- Dates: 11 January - 8 March 2026
- Champions: Flamengo (40th title)
- Relegated: Maricá Futebol Clube
- Matches: 61
- Goals: 154 (2.52 per match)
- Top goalscorer: Pedro and Patryck Ferreira (6 goals)

The 2026 Campeonato Carioca de Futebol was the 123rd edition of the top division of football in the state of Rio de Janeiro. The competition is organized by FERJ. It began on 11 January 2026 and ended on 8 March 2026. Flamengo are the defending champions.

== Participating teams ==
Location of teams in the 2026 Campeonato Carioca
Location of teams in the 2026 Campeonato Carioca – city of Rio de Janeiro

Club	Home city (Note: Some clubs sold their home field advantage for some of their games to third parties, which means that some games were played in different states)	Head coach	2025 result
Bangu Atlético Clube	Rio de Janeiro (Bangu)	Flávio Tinoco	1st (Série A2)
Boavista Sport Club	Saquarema	Gilson Kleina	8th
Botafogo de Futebol e Regatas	Rio de Janeiro (Engenho de Dentro) (Note: Although Botafogo FR is headquartered in Botafogo, it plays home games at Engenhão Stadium)	Martín Anselmi	9th
Clube de Regatas do Flamengo	Rio de Janeiro (Maracanã) (Note: Although CR Flamengo is headquartered in Lagoa, it plays home games at Maracanã Stadium)	Filipe Luís	1st
Fluminense Football Club	Rio de Janeiro (Maracanã) (Note: Although Fluminense FC is headquartered in Laranjeiras, it plays home games at Maracanã Stadium)	Luis Zubeldía	2nd
Madureira Esporte Clube	Rio de Janeiro (Madureira)	Felipe Surian	6th
Maricá Futebol Clube	Maricá	Reinaldo	10th
Nova Iguaçu Futebol Clube	Nova Iguaçu	Carlos Vitor	7th
Associação Atlética Portuguesa	Rio de Janeiro (Governador Island)	Alex Nascif	11th
Sampaio Corrêa Futebol e Esporte	Saquarema	Alfredo Sampaio	5th
Club de Regatas Vasco da Gama	Rio de Janeiro (Vasco da Gama)	Fernando Diniz	4th
Volta Redonda Futebol Clube	Volta Redonda	Rodrigo Santana	3rd

== Format ==
The format for this edition has been modified compared to previous editions, with a reduction from 15 to 10 available dates, according to the new calendar of the CBF. The main phase — Taça Guanabara — divides the 12 clubs into two groups (A and B), with each team playing every team from the other group once. At the end of the six rounds, the four best-placed teams will face each other in a single match, with an Olympic-style crossover within their own group (A1 x A4, A2 x A3, B1 x B4 and B2 x B3). The semifinals will be played in two legs between the winners, after a draw to determine the matchups. The losers of the quarterfinals will compete for the Taça Rio, also in two legs, after a draw to determine the matchups. The final (of the Championship and the Taça Rio) will be a single match. The club with the worst record in the group stage will be relegated to the 2026 Campeonato Carioca de Futebol - Série A2, and the second-worst club will compete for a spot in the 2027 Campeonato Carioca against the runner-up of the same Série A2.

=== Taça Guanabara (Main Phase) ===
As in previous editions, the main phase consists only of the Taça Guanabara. It is contested by the 11 best-ranked teams from the previous year's Campeonato Carioca and the champion of the 2025 Série A2, but with the teams divided into two groups (A and B) and with matches between clubs from one group against those from the other group, meaning that each club plays six games.

=== Final Phase ===
The top four teams from each group of the Taça Guanabara will compete in the quarterfinals, in a single match and in an Olympic-style crossover within their own group (A1 x A4, A2 x A3, B1 x B4 and B2 x B3). The winners will compete in the semifinals, after a draw of the matchups, in two-legged matches. The winners of the semifinals will compete in the single-match final of the Campeonato Carioca.

=== Taça Rio ===
The Taça Rio will be contested by the teams defeated in the quarterfinals, after a draw for the matches, in two-legged ties. The winners will compete in a single-legged final.

== Taça Guanabara ==
=== Group A ===
Pos	Team	Pld	W	D	L	GF	GA	GD	Pts	Qualification or relegation
1	Fluminense	6	5	0	1	9	5	+4	15	Qualified for the Quarter-final
2	Vasco da Gama	6	3	2	1	9	3	+6	11	Qualified for the Quarter-final
3	Volta Redonda	6	3	2	1	9	5	+4	11	Qualified for the Quarter-final
4	Bangu	6	3	1	2	7	7	0	10	Qualified for the Quarter-final
5	Portuguesa	6	2	1	3	6	7	−1	7	Relegation stage
6	Sampaio Corrêa	6	2	1	3	7	14	−7	7	Relegation stage

Source: FERJ

=== Group B ===
Pos	Team	Pld	W	D	L	GF	GA	GD	Pts	Qualification or relegation
1	Botafogo	6	3	0	3	6	5	+1	9	Qualified for the Quarter-final
2	Madureira	6	2	2	2	5	6	−1	8	Qualified for the Quarter-final
3	Boavista	6	2	2	2	6	8	−2	8	Qualified for the Quarter-final
4	Flamengo	6	2	1	3	11	9	+2	7	Qualified for the Quarter-final
5	Nova Iguaçu	6	1	2	3	8	9	−1	5	Relegation stage
6	Maricá	6	1	0	5	5	10	−5	3	Relegation stage

Source: FERJ

2026 Taça Guanabara champions

13th title

== Relegation stage ==
=== Standings and Results ===
Pos	Team	Pld	W	D	L	GF	GA	GD	Pts	Relegation	AAP	SAM	NVG	MAR
1	Portuguesa	6	3	2	1	13	7	+6	11			2–0	1–1	5–2
2	Sampaio Corrêa	6	3	1	2	10	8	+2	10		3–2		1–1	2–1
3	Nova Iguaçu	6	1	4	1	7	6	+1	7		1–1	2–0		0–1
4	Maricá (R)	6	1	1	4	6	15	−9	4	Relegation to Série A2	0–2	0–4	2–2	

Source: FERJ
(R) Relegated

== Taça Rio ==
Semi-finals
B1	Botafogo	2	0	2
B3	Boavista	0	0	0
A3	Volta Redonda	0	1	1
A4	Bangu	1	1	2

Final
B1	Botafogo	3
A4	Bangu	1

2026 Taça Rio champions

10th title

== Final stage ==
Quarter-final
A1	Fluminense	3
A4	Bangu	1
A2	Vasco da Gama (p)	1 (5)
A3	Volta Redonda	1 (3)
B2	Madureira	2
B3	Boavista	1
B1	Botafogo	1
B4	Flamengo	2

Semi-finals
A1	Fluminense	1	1	2
A2	Vasco da Gama	0	1	1
B2	Madureira	0	0	0
B4	Flamengo	3	8	11

Final
A1	Fluminense	0 (4)
B4	Flamengo (p)	0 (5)

=== Quarter-final ===
13 February 2026
17:00

Madureira	2–1	Boavista
Geovane Maranhão 43'; Rodrigo Lindoso 62'	Report	Brunão 45+6' (pen.)

Conselheiro Galvão, Madureira
Attendance: 791
Referee: Alex Gomes Stefano

14 February 2026
21:30

Vasco da Gama	1–1	Volta Redonda
Spinelli 67'	Report	Ygor Catatau 28'
Penalties
Rojas (penalty scored); Tchê Tchê (penalty scored); Spinelli (penalty scored); David (penalty scored); Puma Rodríguez (penalty scored)	5–3	(penalty missed) Marquinhos; (penalty scored) Lucas Adell; (penalty scored) Wagninho; (penalty scored) Rafael Augusto

São Januário, Rio de Janeiro
Attendance: 8,512
Referee: Jodis Nascimento de Souza

15 February 2026
17:30

Botafogo	1–2	Flamengo
Barboza 54'	Report	Paquetá 19'; Pulgar 84'

Nilton Santos, Rio de Janeiro
Attendance: 10,987
Referee: Bruno Arleu de Araújo

16 February 2026
18:00

Fluminense	3–1	Bangu
Savarino 35'; Canobbio 40'; Ganso 79' (pen.)	Report	Ricardo Sena 82'

Maracanã, Rio de Janeiro
Attendance: 20,006
Referee: Wagner do Nascimento Magalhães

=== Semi-finals ===
22 February 2026
18:00

Vasco da Gama	0–1	Fluminense
	Report	Serna 32'

Nilton Santos, Rio de Janeiro
Attendance: 10,818
Referee: Jodis Nascimento de Souza

1 March 2026
18:00

Fluminense	1–1	Vasco da Gama
Ganso 88' (pen.)	Report	Robert Renan 37'

Maracanã, Rio de Janeiro
Attendance: 38,449
Referee: Wagner do Nascimento Magalhães
22 February 2026
20:30

Flamengo	3–0	Madureira
De la Cruz 53'; De Arrascaeta 64' (pen.); Luiz Araújo 86'	Report

Maracanã, Rio de Janeiro
Attendance: 22,730
Referee: Lucas Coelho Santos

2 March 2026
21:00

Madureira	0–8	Flamengo
	Report	Paquetá 5', 23'; Jean Vianna 39' (o.g.); Pedro 45', 48', 49', 67'; Samuel Lino 88'

Maracanã, Rio de Janeiro
Attendance: 25,059
Referee: Carlos Tadeu Ferreira de Castro

=== Final ===
8 March 2026
18:00

Fluminense	0–0	Flamengo
	Report
Penalties
Ganso (penalty scored); Savarino (penalty scored); Guga (penalty missed); Arana (penalty scored); John Kennedy (penalty scored); Otávio (penalty missed)	4–5	(penalty scored) Jorginho; (penalty missed) Luiz Araújo; (penalty scored) Everton; (penalty scored) Pereira; (penalty scored) Paquetá; (penalty scored) Léo Ortiz

Maracanã, Rio de Janeiro
Attendance: 69,315
Referee: Bruno Arleu de Araújo

== Top goalscorers ==
Rank	Player	Team	Goals
1	(Brazil) Pedro	Flamengo	6
1	(Brazil) Patryck Ferreira	Bangu	6
2	(Colombia) Kevin Serna	Fluminense	5
2	(Brazil) Léo Rafael	Nova Iguaçu	5
