= 2023 Fluminense FC season =

Fluminense
2023 season
- Chairman: Mário Bittencourt
- Manager: Fernando Diniz
- Stadium: Maracanã
- Série A: 7th
- Campeonato Carioca: Winners
- Copa do Brasil: Round of 16
- Copa Libertadores: Winners
- FIFA Club World Cup: Runners-up
- Top goalscorer: League: Germán Cano (10); All: Germán Cano (40)
Home colours	Away colours	Third colours

The 2023 season was Fluminense's 122nd season in the club's history. Fluminense competed in the Campeonato Carioca, Copa do Brasil, Série A, Copa Libertadores and FIFA Club World Cup.

== Squad ==
As of 25 September 2023

Note: Flags indicate national team as defined under FIFA eligibility rules; some limited exceptions apply. Players may hold more than one non-FIFA nationality.

No.	Pos.	Nation	Player
1	GK	BRA	Fábio
2	DF	BRA	Samuel Xavier
4	DF	BRA	Marlon (on loan from Shakhtar Donetsk)
5	MF	BRA	Alexsander
6	DF	BRA	Jorge (on loan from Palmeiras)
7	MF	BRA	André
8	MF	BRA	Matheus Martinelli
9	FW	BRA	John Kennedy
10	MF	BRA	Ganso
11	FW	BRA	Keno
12	DF	BRA	Marcelo
14	FW	ARG	Germán Cano
15	FW	COL	Yony González
16	DF	BRA	Diogo Barbosa

No.	Pos.	Nation	Player
17	MF	URU	Leonardo Fernández (on loan from Toluca)
21	FW	COL	Jhon Arias
22	GK	BRA	Pedro Rangel
23	DF	BRA	Guga
26	DF	BRA	Manoel
29	MF	BRA	Thiago Santos
30	MF	BRA	Felipe Melo
33	DF	BRA	Nino (captain)
37	MF	BRA	Giovanni
44	DF	BRA	David Braz
45	MF	BRA	Lima
55	MF	BRA	Danielzinho
98	GK	BRA	Vitor Eudes
99	FW	BRA	Lelê (on loan from Itaboraí Profute)

== Reserve team ==
Note: Flags indicate national team as defined under FIFA eligibility rules; some limited exceptions apply. Players may hold more than one non-FIFA nationality.

No.	Pos.	Nation	Player
13	DF	BRA	Felipe Andrade
16	DF	BRA	Marcos Pedro
28	MF	BRA	Arthur
32	FW	BRA	Isaac
34	MF	BRA	João Lourenço
35	FW	BRA	João Neto
36	DF	BRA	Júlio Fidelis
38	FW	BRA	Agner
39	FW	BRA	Kauã Elias

No.	Pos.	Nation	Player
40	FW	BRA	Matheus Reis
41	DF	BRA	Kayky Almeida
46	DF	BRA	Lucas Justen
47	DF	BRA	Rafael Monteiro
50	GK	BRA	Gustavo Ramalho
53	DF	BRA	Esquerdinha
—	MF	BRA	Caio Vinícius
—	MF	BRA	Freitas
—	MF	BRA	Gustavo Apis

== Statistics ==
=== Overall ===
Games played	72 (15 Carioca, 4 Copa do Brasil, 13 Copa Libertadores, 38 Série A, 2 Club World Cup)
Games won	37 (10 Carioca, 2 Copa do Brasil, 8 Copa Libertadores, 16 Série A, 1 Club World Cup)
Games drawn	13 (1 Carioca, 1 Copa do Brasil, 3 Copa Libertadores, 8 Série A, 0 Club World Cup)
Games lost	22 (4 Carioca, 1 Copa do Brasil, 2 Copa Libertadores, 14 Série A, 1 Club World Cup)
Goals scored	115
Goals conceded	74
Goal difference	+41
Best result (goal difference)	7–0 (H) v Volta Redonda – Carioca – 2023.03.18
Worst result (goal difference)	0–4 (A) v Manchester City – Club World Cup – 2023.12.22
Top scorer	Germán Cano (40)

Source: Fluminense FC official website

=== Goalscorers ===
Place	Pos.	Nat.	No.	Name	Campeonato Carioca	Copa do Brasil	Copa Libertadores	Série A	Club World Cup	Total
1	FW	(Argentina)	14	Germán Cano	16	1	13	10	0	40
2	MF	(Colombia)	21	Jhon Arias	2	0	2	7	1	12
=	FW	(Brazil)	9	John Kennedy	0	1	4	6	1	12
3	MF	(Brazil)	45	Lima	1	0	0	6	0	7
4	MF	(Brazil)	11	Keno	1	2	0	2	0	5
=	DF	(Brazil)	33	Nino	1	1	1	2	0	5
5	MF	(Brazil)	10	Paulo Henrique Ganso	1	0	0	3	0	4
=	DF	(Brazil)	2	Samuel Xavier	1	0	2	1	0	4
6	MF/DF	(Brazil)	30	Felipe Melo	0	1	0	2	0	3
=	MF	(Brazil)	8	Matheus Martinelli	1	0	0	2	0	3
7	FW	(Brazil)	18	Alan	1	0	0	1	0	2
=	MF	(Brazil)	5	Alexsander	2	0	0	0	0	2
=	MF	(Brazil)	20	Gabriel Pirani	1	0	0	1	0	2
=	FW	(Brazil)	99	Lelê	0	0	0	2	0	2
=	DF	(Brazil)	12	Marcelo	1	0	0	1	0	2
8	MF	(Brazil)	7	André	0	0	1	0	0	1
=	DF	(Brazil)	16	Diogo Barbosa	0	0	0	1	0	1
=	DF	(Brazil)	23	Guga	0	0	0	1	0	1
=	FW	(Brazil)	35	João Neto	0	0	0	1	0	1
=	MF	(Uruguay)	17	Leo Fernández	0	0	0	1	0	1
=	FW	(Brazil)	38	Marrony	1	0	0	0	0	1
=	DF	(Brazil)	4	Mendes	0	0	1	0	0	1
=	FW	(Colombia)	15	Yony González	0	0	0	1	0	1
				Own goals	2	0	0	0	0	2
				Total	32	6	24	51	2	115

== Competitions ==
=== Campeonato Carioca ===
==== Matches ====
14 January 2023 1	Resende	0–2	Fluminense	Volta Redonda
16:00 (UTC-3)		Report	Joanderson 20' (o.g.); Alan 88' (pen.)	Stadium: Estádio Raulino de Oliveira; Referee: Yuri Elino Ferreira da Cruz

17 January 2023 2	Fluminense	1–0	Nova Iguaçu	Rio de Janeiro
21:10 (UTC-3)	Lima 44'	Report		Stadium: Maracanã; Referee: Felipe da Silva Gonçalves Paludo

22 January 2023 3	Madureira	0–1	Fluminense	Cariacica
18:00 (UTC-3)		Report	Arias 7'	Stadium: Estádio Kléber Andrade; Referee: Paulo Renato Moreira da Silva Coelho

26 January 2023 4	Fluminense	1–1	Boavista	Rio de Janeiro
21:10 (UTC-3)	Kevem 45+2' (o.g.)	Report	Marquinhos 90'	Stadium: Maracanã; Referee: Tarcizo Pinheiro Caetano

29 January 2023 5	Fluminense	0–1	Botafogo	Rio de Janeiro
18:00 (UTC-3)		Report	Victor Sá 61'	Stadium: Maracanã; Attendance: 28,068; Referee: Bruno Mota Correia

2 February 2023 6	Volta Redonda	1–0	Fluminense	Volta Redonda
21:10 (UTC-3)	Lelê 48'	Report		Stadium: Estádio Raulino de Oliveira; Referee: Wagner do Nascimento Magalhães

5 February 2023 7	Fluminense	3–0	Audax Rio	Rio de Janeiro
18:00 (UTC-3)	Cano 9', 39', 90'	Report		Stadium: Maracanã; Referee: Paulo Renato Moreira da Silva Coelho

12 February 2023 8	Fluminense	2–0	Vasco da Gama	Rio de Janeiro
18:00 (UTC-3)	Cano 66', 90+2'	Report		Stadium: Maracanã; Referee: Felipe da Silva Gonçalves Paludo

25 February 2023 9	Fluminense	3–0	Portuguesa	Rio de Janeiro
16:00 (UTC-3)	Cano 59', 68'; Keno 72'	Report		Stadium: Maracanã; Attendance: 23,866; Referee: Alan Trindade da Silva

4 March 2023 10	Bangu	0–5	Fluminense	Brasília
(UTC-3)		Report	Ganso 10'; Cano 24', 76' (pen.); Arias 62' (pen.); Marrony 90+1'	Stadium: Mané Garrincha; Attendance: 14,406; Referee: André Rodrigo Rocha

8 March 2023 11	Flamengo	1–2	Fluminense	Rio de Janeiro
21:10 (UTC-3)	Everton 19'	Report	Cano 53'; Pirani 85'	Stadium: Maracanã; Attendance: 56,409; Referee: Grazianni Maciel Rocha

==== Semi-finals ====
12 March 2023	Volta Redonda	2–1	Fluminense	Volta Redonda
18:00 (UTC-3)	Pedrinho 29'; Lelê 52'	Report	Nino 81'	Stadium: Estádio Raulino de Oliveira; Referee: Yuri Elino Ferreira da Cruz

18 March 2023	Fluminense	7–0	Volta Redonda	Rio de Janeiro
16:00 (UTC-3)	Samuel Xavier 4'; Cano 8', 45+5', 64', 90'; Alexsander 26'; Martinelli 42'	Report		Stadium: Maracanã; Attendance: 43,550; Referee: Wagner do Nascimento Magalhães

==== Finals ====
1 April 2023	Flamengo	2–0	Fluminense	Rio de Janeiro
20:30 (UTC-3)	Ayrton Lucas 51'; Pedro 70'	Report		Stadium: Maracanã; Attendance: 65,234; Referee: Wagner do Nascimento Magalhães

9 April 2023	Fluminense	4–1	Flamengo	Rio de Janeiro
18:00 (UTC-3)	Marcelo 30'; Cano 34', 56'; Alexsander 65'	Report	Ayrton Lucas 90+8'	Stadium: Maracanã; Attendance: 65,075; Referee: Bruno Arleu de Araújo

==== Record ====
Final Position	Points	Matches	Wins	Draws	Losses	Goals For	Goals Away	Avg%
1st	31	15	10	1	4	32	9	68%

=== Copa do Brasil ===
==== Third round ====
12 April 2023	Fluminense	3–0	Paysandu	Rio de Janeiro
19:30 (UTC-3)	Nino 28'; Keno 35'; Felipe Melo 41'	Report		Stadium: Maracanã; Attendance: 27,856; Referee: Anderson Daronco

25 April 2023	Paysandu	0–3	Fluminense	Belém
20:00 (UTC-3)		Report	Cano 3'; Keno 44'; John Kennedy 72'	Stadium: Mangueirão; Attendance: 32,681; Referee: Edina Alves Batista

==== Round of 16 ====
16 May 2023	Fluminense	0–0	Flamengo	Rio de Janeiro
21:00 (UTC-3)		Report		Stadium: Maracanã; Attendance: 59,295; Referee: Anderson Daronco

1 June 2023	Flamengo	2–0	Fluminense	Rio de Janeiro
20:00 (UTC-3)	de Arrascaeta 33'; Gabriel 90+2'	Report		Stadium: Maracanã; Attendance: 69,978; Referee: Raphael Claus

==== Record ====
Final Position	Points	Matches	Wins	Draws	Losses	Goals For	Goals Away	Avg%
12th	7	4	2	1	1	6	2	58%

=== Copa Libertadores ===
==== Group stage ====
5 April 2023 1	Sporting Cristal (Peru)	1–3	(Brazil) Fluminense	Lima
19:30 (UTC-5)	Grimaldo 18'	Report	Cano 35', 59'; Mendes 81'	Stadium: Estadio Nacional; Attendance: 30,000; Referee: Wilmar Roldán (Colombia)

18 April 2023 2	Fluminense (Brazil)	1–0	(Bolivia) The Strongest	Rio de Janeiro
19:00 (UTC-3)	Nino 40'	Report		Stadium: Maracanã; Attendance: 52,419; Referee: Carlos Ortega (Colombia)

2 May 2023 3	Fluminense (Brazil)	5–1	(Argentina) River Plate	Rio de Janeiro
21:00 (UTC-3)	Cano 29', 53', 86'; Arias 75', 90+1'	Report	Beltrán 39'	Stadium: Maracanã; Attendance: 62,505; Referee: Esteban Ostojich (Uruguay)

25 May 2023 4	The Strongest (Bolivia)	1–0	(Brazil) Fluminense	La Paz
18:00 (UTC-4)	Triverio 4'	Report		Stadium: Estadio Hernando Siles; Attendance: 30,000; Referee: Felipe González (Chile)

7 June 2023 5	River Plate (Argentina)	2–0	(Brazil) Fluminense	Buenos Aires
21:30 (UTC-3)	Beltrán 49'; Barco 90+7' (pen.)	Report		Stadium: Estadio Monumental; Attendance: 66,362; Referee: Wilmar Roldán (Colombia)

27 June 2023 6	Fluminense (Brazil)	1–1	(Peru) Sporting Cristal	Rio de Janeiro
21:00 (UTC-3)	Cano 22'	Report	Brenner 37'	Stadium: Maracanã; Attendance: 50,683; Referee: Piero Maza (Chile)

==== Round of 16 ====
1 August 2023	Argentinos Juniors (Argentina)	1–1	(Brazil) Fluminense	Buenos Aires
19:00 (UTC-3)	Ávalos 14'	Report	Samuel Xavier 87'	Stadium: Estadio Diego Armando Maradona; Attendance: 7,860; Referee: Piero Maza (Chile)

8 August 2023	Fluminense (Brazil)	2–0	(Argentina) Argentinos Juniors	Rio de Janeiro
19:00 (UTC-3)	Samuel Xavier 86'; John Kennedy 90+7'	Report		Stadium: Maracanã; Referee: Alexis Herrera (Venezuela)

==== Quarter-finals ====
24 August 2023	Fluminense (Brazil)	2–0	(Paraguay) Olimpia	Rio de Janeiro
21:30 (UTC-3)	André 43'; Cano 59'	Report		Stadium: Maracanã; Attendance: 64,047; Referee: Andrés Matonte (Uruguay)

31 August 2023	Olimpia (Paraguay)	1–3	(Brazil) Fluminense	Asunción
20:30 (UTC-3)	Zabala 44'	Report	John Kennedy 24'; Cano 80', 90+1'	Stadium: Estadio Defensores del Chaco; Attendance: 34,793; Referee: Jesús Valenzuela (Venezuela)

==== Semi-finals ====
27 September 2023	Fluminense (Brazil)	2–2	(Brazil) Internacional	Rio de Janeiro
21:30 (UTC-3)	Cano 10', 78'	Report	Mallo 45+5'; Alan Patrick 64'	Stadium: Maracanã; Attendance: 67,515; Referee: Darío Herrera (Argentina)

4 October 2023	Internacional (Brazil)	1–2	(Brazil) Fluminense	Porto Alegre
21:30 (UTC-3)	Mercado 10'	Report	John Kennedy 81'; Cano 87'	Stadium: Estádio Beira-Rio, Attendance: 50,002; Referee: Jesús Valenzuela (Venezuela)

==== Final ====
4 November 2023	Boca Juniors (Argentina)	1–2 (a.e.t.)	(Brazil) Fluminense	Rio de Janeiro
17:00 (UTC-3)	Advíncula 72'	Report	Cano 36'; John Kennedy 99'	Stadium: Maracanã; Attendance: 69,232; Referee: Wilmar Roldán (Colombia)

==== Record ====
Final Position	Points	Matches	Wins	Draws	Losses	Goals For	Goals Away	Avg%
1st	27	13	8	3	2	24	12	69%

=== Série A ===
==== League table ====
Pos	Team	Pld	W	D	L	GF	GA	GD	Pts	Qualification or relegation
5	Botafogo	38	18	10	10	58	37	+21	64	Qualification for Copa Libertadores second stage
6	Red Bull Bragantino	38	17	11	10	49	35	+14	62	Qualification for Copa Libertadores second stage
7	Fluminense	38	16	8	14	51	47	+4	56	Qualification for Copa Libertadores group stage (Note: Fluminense qualified for the Copa Libertadores group stage by winning the 2023 Copa Libertadores.)
8	Athletico Paranaense	38	14	14	10	51	43	+8	56	Qualification for Copa Sudamericana group stage
9	Internacional	38	15	10	13	46	45	+1	55	Qualification for Copa Sudamericana group stage

Source: CBF
Rules for classification: 1) points; 2) wins; 3) goal difference; 4) goals scored; 5) head-to-head results (only between two teams); 6) fewest red cards; 7) fewest yellow cards; 8) drawing of lots.

==== Matches ====
15 April 2023 1	América–MG	0–3	Fluminense	Belo Horizonte
16:00 (UTC-3)		Report	Cano 51'; John Kennedy 59'; Lelê 71'	Stadium: Arena Independência; Attendance: 6,653; Referee: Bráulio da Silva Machado

22 April 2023 2	Fluminense	2–0	Athletico Paranaense	Rio de Janeiro
16:00 (UTC-3)	Lima 10'; Nino 66'	Report		Stadium: Maracanã; Attendance: 38,598; Referee: Paulo Cesar Zanovelli da Silva

29 April 2023 3	Fortaleza	4–2	Fluminense	Fortaleza
16:30 (UTC-3)	Thiago Galhardo 28'; Moisés 31', 59'; Hércules 78'	Report	Alan 45+1'; John Kennedy 68'	Stadium: Castelão; Attendance: 39,943; Referee: Raphael Claus

6 May 2023 4	Fluminense	1–1	Vasco da Gama	Rio de Janeiro
21:00 (UTC-3)	Lima 54'	Report	Pedro Raul 1'	Stadium: Maracanã; Attendance: 39,850; Referee: Wilton Pereira Sampaio

10 May 2023 5	Cruzeiro	0–2	Fluminense	Belo Horizonte
21:30 (UTC-3)		Report	Ganso 43'; Cano 53'	Stadium: Mineirão; Attendance: 51,846; Referee: Flávio Rodrigues de Souza

13 May 2023 6	Fluminense	2–0	Cuiabá	Rio de Janeiro
18:30 (UTC-3)	Nino 5'; Ganso 55'	Report		Stadium: Maracanã; Attendance: 39,040; Referee: Edina Alves Batista

20 May 2023 7	Botafogo	1–0	Fluminense	Rio de Janeiro
18:30 (UTC-3)	Cuesta 74'	Report		Stadium: Nilton Santos; Attendance: 24,732; Referee: Braulio da Silva Machado

28 May 2023 8	Corinthians	2–0	Fluminense	São Paulo
16:00 (UTC-3)	Róger Guedes 59', 90+2'	Report		Stadium: Neo Química Arena; Attendance: 34,624; Referee: Leandro Vuaden

4 June 2023 9	Fluminense	2–1	Red Bull Bragantino	Rio de Janeiro
16:00 (UTC-3)	Ganso 27'; Felipe Melo 33'	Report	Borbas 53'	Stadium: Maracanã; Attendance: 27,228; Referee: Rodrigo Jose Pereira de Lima

11 June 2023 10	Goiás	2–2	Fluminense	Goiânia
18:30 (UTC-3)	Matheus Peixoto 45+1'; Alesson 85'	Report	Cano 2'; Lima 46'	Stadium: Serrinha; Attendance: 10,260; Referee: Leandro Pedro Vuaden

21 June 2023 11	Fluminense	1–1	Atlético Mineiro	Volta Redonda
21:30 (UTC-3)	Samuel Xavier 45+1'	Report	Guga 35' (o.g.)	Stadium: Raulino de Oliveira; Attendance: 7,788; Referee: Ramon Abatti Abel

24 June 2023 12	Fluminense	2–1	Bahia	Rio de Janeiro
18:30 (UTC-3)	Lelê 49'; Gabriel Pirani 51'	Report	Vinícius Mingotti 28'	Stadium: Maracanã; Attendance: 24,507; Referee: Sávio Pereira Sampaio

1 July 2023 13	São Paulo	1–0	Fluminense	São Paulo
16:00 (UTC-3)	Luciano 87'	Report		Stadium: Morumbi; Attendance: 49,153; Referee: Anderson Daronco

9 July 2023 14	Fluminense	2–0	Internacional	Rio de Janeiro
16:00 (UTC-3)	Cano 25'; Matheus Martinelli 40'	Report		Stadium: Maracanã; Attendance: 34,166; Referee: Luiz Flávio de Oliveira

16 July 2023 15	Fluminense	0–0	Flamengo	Rio de Janeiro
16:00 (UTC-3)		Report		Stadium: Maracanã; Attendance: 62,354; Referee: Sávio Pereira Sampaio

24 July 2023 16	Coritiba	2–0	Fluminense	Curitiba
19:00 (UTC-3)	Robson 23'; Diogo 27'	Report		Stadium: Couto Pereira; Attendance: 30,481; Referee: Flavio Rodrigues de Souza

29 July 2023 17	Fluminense	1–0	Santos	Rio de Janeiro
16:00 (UTC-3)	Cano 77'	Report		Stadium: Maracanã; Attendance: 34,211; Referee: Rodrigo José Pereira de Lima

5 August 2023 18	Fluminense	2–1	Palmeiras	Rio de Janeiro
21:00 (UTC-3)	Arias 15' (pen.); John Kennedy 59'	Report	Gómez 90+6'	Stadium: Maracanã; Attendance: 31,037; Referee: Ramon Abatti Abel

13 August 2023 19	Grêmio	2–1	Fluminense	Porto Alegre
16:00 (UTC-3)	Bitello 25'; Ferreira 45+1'	Report	Cano 19'	Stadium: Arena do Grêmio; Attendance: 38,712; Referee: Rodrigo José Pereira de Lima

19 August 2023 20	Fluminense	3–1	América–MG	Rio de Janeiro
18:30 (UTC-3)	John Kennedy 57'; Cano 64'; Arias 88'	Report	Felipe Azevedo 52'	Stadium: Maracanã; Attendance: 35,562; Referee: Flavio Rodrigues de Souza

27 August 2023 21	Athletico Paranaense	2–2	Fluminense	Curitiba
18:30 (UTC-3)	Cacá 12'; Vitor Roque 90+3'	Report	Guga 75'; João Neto 87'	Stadium: Ligga Arena; Attendance: 22,377; Referee: Raphael Claus

3 September 2023 22	Fluminense	1–0	Fortaleza	Volta Redonda
16:00 (UTC-3)	Diogo Barbosa 90+1'	Report		Stadium: Raulino de Oliveira; Attendance: 10,035; Referee: André Luiz Skettino Policarpo Bento

16 September 2023 23	Vasco da Gama	4–2	Fluminense	Rio de Janeiro
16:00 (UTC-3)	Bruno Praxedes 23'; Vegetti 49'; Gabriel Pec 73', 84'	Report	Marcelo 46'; Lima 55'	Stadium: Nilton Santos; Attendance: 38,850; Referee: Raphael Claus

20 September 2023 24	Fluminense	1–0	Cruzeiro	Rio de Janeiro
21:30 (UTC-3)	Leo Fernández 66'	Report		Stadium: Maracanã; Attendance: 28,985; Referee: Matheus Candançan

30 September 2023 25	Cuiabá	3–0	Fluminense	Cuiabá
18:30 (UTC-3)	Clayson 56'; Alan Empereur 63'; Fernando Sobral 86'	Report		Stadium: Arena Pantanal; Attendance: 8,358; Referee: Paulo Cesar Zanovelli da Silva

8 October 2023 26	Fluminense	0–2	Botafogo	Rio de Janeiro
16:00 (UTC-3)		Report	Júnior Santos 19'; Tiquinho Soares 22'	Stadium: Maracanã; Attendance: 45,193; Referee: Leandro Pedro Vuaden

19 October 2023 27	Fluminense	3–3	Corinthians	Rio de Janeiro
21:30 (UTC-3)	Lima 22', 56'; Arias 83'	Report	Yuri Alberto 10', 27'; Fábio Santos 32' (pen.)	Stadium: Maracanã; Attendance: 36,916; Referee: Paulo Cesar Zanovelli da Silva

22 October 2023 28	Red Bull Bragantino	1–0	Fluminense	Bragança Paulista
18:30 (UTC-3)	Eduardo Sasha 16'	Report		Stadium: Nabi Abi Chedid; Attendance: 6,703; Referee: Wilton Pereira Sampaio

25 October 2023 29	Fluminense	5–3	Goiás	Volta Redonda
19:00 (UTC-3)	Felipe Melo 16'; Arias 36', 46'; Keno 52', 63'	Report	Allano 4'; Matheus Babi 12'; Palacios 67'	Stadium: Raulino de Oliveira; Attendance: 4,793; Referee: Leandro Pedro Vuaden

28 October 2023 30	Atlético Mineiro	2–0	Fluminense	Belo Horizonte
21:00 (UTC-3)	Paulinho 62', 83'	Report		Stadium: Arena MRV; Attendance: 23,003; Referee: Raphael Claus

31 October 2023 31	Bahia	1–0	Fluminense	Salvador
19:00 (UTC-3)	Everaldo 40'	Report		Stadium: Arena Fonte Nova; Attendance: 34,319; Referee: Edina Alves Batista

22 November 2023 32	Fluminense	1–0	São Paulo	Rio de Janeiro
21:30 (UTC-3)	Cano 54'	Report		Stadium: Maracanã; Attendance: 44,694; Referee: André Luiz Skettino Policarpo Bento

8 November 2023 33	Internacional	0–0	Fluminense	Porto Alegre
19:00 (UTC-3)		Report		Stadium: Beira-Rio; Attendance: 18,669; Referee: Caio Max Augusto Vieira

11 November 2023 34	Flamengo	1–1	Fluminense	Rio de Janeiro
18:30 (UTC-3)	de Arrascaeta 45+2'	Report	González 62'	Stadium: Maracanã; Attendance: 64,399; Referee: Wilton Pereira Sampaio

25 November 2023 35	Fluminense	2–1	Coritiba	Rio de Janeiro
21:00 (UTC-3)	Cano 45'; John Kennedy 62'	Report	Jesé 89'	Stadium: Maracanã; Attendance: 19,919; Referee: Matheus Delgado Candançan

29 November 2023 36	Santos	0–3	Fluminense	Santos
19:00 (UTC-3)		Report	Matheus Martinelli 10'; Arias 36'; Cano 59'	Stadium: Vila Belmiro; Attendance: 12,855; Referee: Anderson Daronco

3 December 2023 37	Palmeiras	1–0	Fluminense	São Paulo
16:00 (UTC-3)	Breno Lopes 30'	Report		Stadium: Allianz Parque; Attendance: 29,986; Referee: Bráulio da Silva Machado

6 December 2023 38	Fluminense	2–3	Grêmio	Rio de Janeiro
21:30 (UTC-3)	Arias 34'; John Kennedy 81'	Report	Suárez 43', 64' (pen.); Everton Galdino 45'	Stadium: Maracanã; Attendance: 43,286; Referee: Raphael Claus

==== Record ====
Final Position	Points	Matches	Wins	Draws	Losses	Goals For	Goals Away	Avg%
7th	56	38	16	8	14	51	47	49%

=== FIFA Club World Cup ===
==== Semi-final ====
18 December 2023	Fluminense (Brazil)	2–0	(Egypt) Al Ahly	Jeddah
21:00 (UTC+3)	Arias 71' (pen.); John Kennedy 90'	Report		Stadium: King Abdullah Sports City Stadium; Attendance: 34,986; Referee: Szymon Marciniak (Poland)

==== Final ====
22 December 2023	Manchester City (England)	4–0	(Brazil) Fluminense	Jeddah
21:00 (UTC+3)	Álvarez 1', 88'; Nino 27' (o.g.); Foden 72'	Report		Stadium: King Abdullah Sports City Stadium; Attendance: 52,601; Referee: Szymon Marciniak (Poland)

==== Record ====
Final Position	Points	Matches	Wins	Draws	Losses	Goals For	Goals Away	Avg%
2nd	3	2	1	0	1	2	4	50%
