= 2022 Clube Atlético Mineiro season =

Atlético Mineiro
2022 season
- President: Sérgio Coelho
- Head coach: Antonio Mohamed (13 January–22 July); Lucas Gonçalves (interim, 22 July–24 July); Cuca (25 July–14 November)
- Stadium: Mineirão
- Série A: 7th
- Campeonato Mineiro: Winners
- Copa do Brasil: Round of 16
- Copa Libertadores: Quarter-finals
- Supercopa do Brasil: Winners
- Top goalscorer: League: Hulk (12); All: Hulk (29)
Home colours	Away colours

The 2022 season was the 108th season in the existence of Clube Atlético Mineiro and the 16th consecutive season in the top flight of Brazilian football. In addition to the national league, Atlético Mineiro participated in this season's editions of the Campeonato Mineiro, the Copa do Brasil, Copa Libertadores and the Supercopa do Brasil.

== Players ==
As of 14 November 2022.

Note: Flags indicate national team as defined under FIFA eligibility rules; some limited exceptions apply. Players may hold more than one non-FIFA nationality.

No.	Pos.	Nation	Player
1	GK	BRA	Gabriel Delfim
2	DF	BRA	Guga
3	DF	PAR	Júnior Alonso (on loan from Krasnodar)
4	DF	BRA	Réver (captain)
5	MF	BRA	Otávio
6	DF	BRA	Dodô
7	FW	BRA	Hulk
8	MF	BRA	Jair
10	FW	CHI	Eduardo Vargas
11	FW	BRA	Keno
13	DF	BRA	Guilherme Arana
14	FW	BRA	Alan Kardec
15	MF	ARG	Matías Zaracho
16	DF	BRA	Igor Rabello
18	FW	BRA	Eduardo Sasha
19	FW	BRA	Ademir

No.	Pos.	Nation	Player
22	GK	BRA	Everson
25	DF	BRA	Mariano
26	MF	ARG	Nacho Fernández
27	MF	BRA	Calebe
28	FW	BRA	Felipe Felicio
29	MF	BRA	Allan
30	FW	ARG	Cristian Pavón
31	GK	BRA	Matheus Mendes
32	GK	BRA	Rafael
34	DF	BRA	Jemerson
37	MF	BRA	Pedrinho (on loan from Shakhtar Donetsk)
40	DF	BRA	Nathan Silva
41	MF	BRA	Neto
44	MF	BRA	Rubens
51	DF	BRA	Hiago

=== Other players with first team appearances ===
Note: Flags indicate national team as defined under FIFA eligibility rules; some limited exceptions apply. Players may hold more than one non-FIFA nationality.

No. / Pos. / Nation / Player; 45 / MF / BRA / Yan Phillipe	No. / Pos. / Nation / Player; 47 / FW / BRA / Júlio Cesar

== Transfers ==
=== In ===
No.	Pos	Player	Transferred from	Fee	Date	Source
19	FW	(Brazil) Ademir	América Mineiro	Free transfer	1 January 2022	
23	MF	(Brazil) Guilherme Castilho	Juventude	Loan return	1 January 2022	
34	DF	(Brazil) Vitor Mendes	Juventude	Loan return	1 January 2022	
9	FW	(Brazil) Fábio Gomes	Oeste	€1,250,000	7 January 2022	
14	DF	(Uruguay) Diego Godín	(Italy) Cagliari	Free transfer	12 January 2022	
5	MF	(Brazil) Otávio	(France) Bordeaux	Loan	4 February 2022	
3	DF	(Paraguay) Júnior Alonso	(Russia) Krasnodar	Loan, €200,000	14 March 2022	
34	DF	(Brazil) Jemerson	Unattached	Free transfer	20 June 2022	
14	FW	(Brazil) Alan Kardec	Unattached	Free transfer	24 June 2022	
37	MF	(Brazil) Pedrinho	(Ukraine) Shakhtar Donetsk	Loan	30 June 2022	
5	MF	(Brazil) Otávio	(France) Bordeaux	Free transfer	1 July 2022	
30	FW	(Argentina) Cristian Pavón	(Argentina) Boca Juniors	Free transfer	3 July 2022	

=== Out ===
No.	Pos	Player	Transferred to	Fee	Date	Source
—	MF	(Brazil) Adriano	Botafogo-PB	Undisclosed	1 January 2022	
3	DF	(Paraguay) Júnior Alonso	(Russia) Krasnodar	€8,000,000	7 January 2022	
19	FW	(Spain) Diego Costa	Unattached	Mutual termination	7 January 2022	
—	DF	(Brazil) Iago Maidana	América Mineiro	Free transfer	13 January 2022	
—	FW	(Brazil) Marquinhos	(Hungary) Ferencváros	€1,650,000	14 February 2022	
37	MF	(Brazil) Tchê Tchê	São Paulo	End of loan	11 April 2022	
30	MF	(Colombia) Dylan Borrero	(United States) New England Revolution	€3,700,000	22 April 2022	
—	DF	(Brazil) Matheus Lima	Democrata-SL	Free transfer	22 April 2022	
17	FW	(Venezuela) Jefferson Savarino	(United States) Real Salt Lake	€2,370,000	30 April 2022	
14	DF	(Uruguay) Diego Godín	Unattached	Mutual termination	20 June 2022	
—	DF	(Brazil) Maílton	(Ukraine) Metalist Kharkiv	€800,000	1 July 2022	
33	FW	(Brazil) Sávio	(France) Troyes	€6,500,000	1 July 2022	
—	DF	(Brazil) Talison	(Portugal) Alverca	Undisclosed	1 July 2022	
23	MF	(Brazil) Guilherme Castilho	Ceará	€1,800,000	27 July 2022	
—	MF	(Brazil) Zé Welison	Fortaleza	€228,500	20 August 2022	

=== Loans out ===
No.	Pos	Player	Transferred to	Fee	Date	Source
—	GK	(Brazil) Michael	(Portugal) Alverca	Undisclosed	1 January 2022	
21	MF	(Ecuador) Alan Franco	(United States) Charlotte FC	€135,000	1 January 2022	
23	MF	(Brazil) Nathan	Fluminense	€150,000	4 January 2022	
34	GK	(Brazil) Jean	CSA	Undisclosed	10 January 2022	
—	MF	(Brazil) Alessandro Vinícius	Villa Nova	Undisclosed	17 January 2022	
—	MF	(Brazil) Wesley	Villa Nova	Undisclosed	17 January 2022	
20	MF	(Brazil) Hyoran	Red Bull Bragantino	€80,000	20 January 2022	
—	DF	(Uruguay) Lucas Hernández	Sport Recife	Undisclosed	21 January 2022	
—	MF	(Brazil) Gustavo Blanco	Londrina	Undisclosed	25 January 2022	
—	MF	(Brazil) Zé Welison	Fortaleza	Undisclosed	20 February 2022	
—	MF	(Brazil) Ralph	Náutico	Undisclosed	14 March 2022	
—	MF	(Brazil) Gustavo Blanco	Vitória	Undisclosed	25 March 2022	
43	FW	(Brazil) Luiz Filipe	Goiás	Undisclosed	4 April 2022	
—	MF	(Brazil) Alessandro Vinícius	Paysandu	Undisclosed	4 April 2022	
—	MF	(Brazil) Wesley	Paysandu	Undisclosed	4 April 2022	
48	FW	(Brazil) Echaporã	Ponte Preta	Undisclosed	5 April 2022	
34	DF	(Brazil) Vitor Mendes	Juventude	€90,000	12 April 2022	
45	DF	(Brazil) Micael	(United States) Houston Dynamo	Undisclosed	27 April 2022	
—	MF	(Ecuador) Alan Franco	(Argentina) Talleres	€143,000	27 June 2022	
—	MF	(Brazil) Daniel Penha	(South Korea) Daegu	€100,000	6 July 2022	
9	FW	(Brazil) Fábio Gomes	Vasco da Gama	Undisclosed	29 July 2022	
—	MF	(Brazil) Bruninho	CRB	Undisclosed	1 August 2022	
—	MF	(Paraguay) Ramón Martínez	Novorizontino	Undisclosed	11 August 2022	

=== Transfer summary ===
Undisclosed fees are not included in the transfer totals.

Expenditure

Total: ▼€1,450,000

Income

Total: ▲€24,746,500

Net total

Total: ▲€23,296,500

== Competitions ==
=== Overview ===
Competition	First match	Last match	Starting round	Final position	Record							
Competition	First match	Last match	Starting round	Final position	Pld	W	D	L	GF	GA	GD	Win %
Campeonato Brasileiro	10 April 2022	13 November 2022	Matchday 1	7th	38	15	13	10	45	37	+8	39.47
Campeonato Mineiro	26 January 2022	2 April 2022	First stage	Winners	14	12	1	1	31	6	+25	85.71
Copa do Brasil	20 April 2022	13 July 2022	Third round	Round of 16	4	3	0	1	6	3	+3	75.00
Copa Libertadores	6 April 2022	10 August 2022	Group stage	Quarter-finals	10	4	5	1	14	9	+5	40.00
Supercopa do Brasil	20 February 2022		Final	Winners	1	0	1	0	2	2	+0	0.00
Total					67	34	20	13	98	57	+41	50.75

Source: Soccerway

=== Campeonato Mineiro ===
==== First stage ====
Pos	Team	Pld	W	D	L	GF	GA	GD	Pts	Qualification or relegation
1	Atlético Mineiro	11	9	1	1	23	5	+18	28	Knockout stage
2	Athletic Club	11	8	1	2	15	4	+11	25	Knockout stage
3	Cruzeiro	11	7	1	3	21	11	+10	22	Knockout stage
4	Caldense	11	6	0	5	12	13	−1	18	Knockout stage
5	América Mineiro	11	5	2	4	11	8	+3	17	Troféu Inconfidência

Source: FMF
Rules for classification: 1) Points; 2) Wins; 3) Goal difference; 4) Goals scored; 5) Head-to-head results (only if two teams are tied); 6) Fewest red cards received; 7) Fewest yellow cards received; 8) Draw.

==== Matches ====
26 January 1	Villa Nova	1–1	Atlético Mineiro	Nova Lima
19:00 UTC−3	Thiago Mosquito 43'	Report	Borrero 89'	Stadium: Estádio Castor Cifuentes; Referee: Felipe Fernandes de Lima

29 January 2	Atlético Mineiro	3–0	Tombense	Belo Horizonte
16:30 UTC−3	Calebe 20'; Hulk 79' (pen.); Savarino 90+1'	Report		Stadium: Mineirão; Referee: André Luis

2 February 3	Uberlândia	0–4	Atlético Mineiro	Uberlândia
19:30 UTC−3		Report	Sasha 5'; Arana 12' (pen.); Fábio Gomes 50'; Ademir 86'	Stadium: Estádio Parque do Sabiá; Referee: Igor Júnior Benevenuto

6 February 4	Atlético Mineiro	3–0	Patrocinense	Belo Horizonte
11:00 UTC−3	Hulk 45+4', 61'; Godín 80'	Report		Stadium: Mineirão; Referee: Vinícius Gomes

9 February 5	URT	1–0	Atlético Mineiro	Patos de Minas
21:30 UTC−3	Derlan 30'	Report		Stadium: Estádio Zama Maciel; Referee: Marco Aurélio Augusto Fazekas Ferreira

12 February 6	América Mineiro	0–2	Atlético Mineiro	Belo Horizonte
16:30 UTC−3		Report	Arana 73'; Savarino 83'	Stadium: Independência; Referee: Felipe Fernandes de Lima

15 February 7	Atlético Mineiro	1–0	Athletic	Belo Horizonte
21:00 UTC−3	Hulk 90+3' (pen.)	Report		Stadium: Mineirão; Referee: Paulo César Zanovelli

26 February 8	Pouso Alegre	2–3	Atlético Mineiro	Pouso Alegre
16:30 UTC−3	Ramon Baiano 60', 81'	Report	Sasha 10', 72'; Fábio Gomes 90+5'	Stadium: Manduzão; Referee: Marco Aurélio Augusto Fazekas Pereira

6 March 9	Atlético Mineiro	2–1	Cruzeiro	Belo Horizonte
18:00 UTC−3	Hulk 85' (pen.); Ademir 90+7'	Report	Vitor Roque 70'	Stadium: Mineirão; Referee: Igor Júnior Benevenuto

12 March 10	Democrata GV	0–1	Atlético Mineiro	Governador Valadares
16:30 UTC−3		Report	Nacho Fernández 86'	Stadium: Mamudão; Referee: Vinícius Gomes

19 March 11	Atlético Mineiro	3–0	Caldense	Belo Horizonte
16:30 UTC−3	Sasha 20'; Vargas 59'; Hulk 70'	Report		Stadium: Mineirão; Referee: Wanderson Alves de Souza

==== Knockout stage ====
===== Semi-finals =====
23 March First leg	Caldense	0–2	Atlético Mineiro	Belo Horizonte
16:30 UTC−3		Report	Hulk 27', 40' (pen.)	Stadium: Mineirão; Referee: André Luis

27 March Second leg	Atlético Mineiro	3–0 (5–0 agg.)	Caldense	Belo Horizonte
18:00 UTC−3	Sasha 20'; Keno 29'; Ademir 65'	Report		Stadium: Mineirão; Referee: Ricardo Marques Ribeiro

===== Final =====
2 April Single match	Atlético Mineiro	3–1	Cruzeiro	Belo Horizonte
16:30 UTC−3	Hulk 31', 81' (pen.); Nacho Fernández 65'	Report	Edu 90'	Stadium: Mineirão; Attendance: 53,572; Referee: Felipe Fernandes de Lima

=== Copa Libertadores ===
Pos	Team	Pld	W	D	L	GF	GA	GD	Pts	Qualification
1	(Brazil) Atlético Mineiro	6	3	2	1	10	6	+4	11	Round of 16
2	(Colombia) Deportes Tolima	6	3	2	1	10	9	+1	11	Round of 16
3	(Ecuador) Independiente del Valle	6	2	2	2	9	7	+2	8	Copa Sudamericana
4	(Brazil) América Mineiro	6	0	2	4	6	13	−7	2	

Source: CONMEBOL
Rules for classification: 1) Points; 2) Goal difference; 3) Goals scored; 4) Away goals scored; 5) CONMEBOL ranking.

6 April 1	Tolima (Colombia)	0–2	(Brazil) Atlético Mineiro	Ibagué, Colombia
21:00 UTC−3		Report	Nacho Fernández 45'; Tchê Tchê 80'	Stadium: Estadio Manuel Murillo Toro; Referee: Fernando Rapallini (Argentina)

13 April 2	Atlético Mineiro (Brazil)	1–1	(Brazil) América Mineiro	Belo Horizonte, Brazil
21:00 UTC−3	Ademir 85'	Report	Felipe Azevedo 51'	Stadium: Mineirão; Referee: Patricio Loustau (Argentina)

26 April 3	Independiente del Valle (Ecuador)	1–1	(Brazil) Atlético Mineiro	Quito, Ecuador
21:30 UTC−3	Sornoza 50'	Report	Hulk 7'	Stadium: Estadio Banco de Guayaquil; Referee: Fernando Rapallini (Argentina)

3 May 4	América Mineiro (Brazil)	1–2	(Brazil) Atlético Mineiro	Belo Horizonte, Brazil
21:30 UTC−3	Conti 39'	Report	Arana 13'; Nacho Fernández 37'	Stadium: Independência; Referee: Darío Herrera (Argentina)

19 May 5	Atlético Mineiro (Brazil)	3–1	(Ecuador) Independiente del Valle	Belo Horizonte, Brazil
19:00 UTC−3	Hulk 9', 56'; Sávio 90+6'	Report	Vargas 85'	Stadium: Mineirão; Attendance: 28,873; Referee: Esteban Ostojich (Uruguay)

25 May 6	Atlético Mineiro (Brazil)	1–2	(Colombia) Tolima	Belo Horizonte, Brazil
21:00 UTC−3	Sasha 88'	Report	Rangel 55'; Lucumí 90+2'	Stadium: Mineirão; Referee: Patricio Loustau (Argentina)

==== Round of 16 ====
The draw for the round of 16 was held on 27 May 2022.

28 June First leg	Emelec (Ecuador)	1–1	(Brazil) Atlético Mineiro	Guayaquil, Ecuador
19:15 UTC−3	Rodríguez 58' (pen.)	Report	Ademir 16'	Stadium: Estadio George Capwell; Referee: Fernando Rapallini (Argentina)

5 July Second leg	Atlético Mineiro (Brazil)	1–0 (2–1 agg.)	(Ecuador) Emelec	Belo Horizonte, Brazil
19:15 UTC−3	Hulk 79' (pen.)	Report		Stadium: Mineirão; Attendance: 56,421; Referee: Jesús Valenzuela (Venezuela)

==== Quarter-finals ====
3 August First leg	Atlético Mineiro (Brazil)	2–2	(Brazil) Palmeiras	Belo Horizonte, Brazil
21:30 UTC−3	Hulk 45+1' (pen.); Murilo 47' (o.g.)	Report	Murilo 59'; Danilo 90+2'	Stadium: Mineirão; Attendance: 57,140; Referee: Facundo Tello (Argentina)

10 August Second leg	Palmeiras (Brazil)	0–0 (2–2 agg.) (6–5 p)	(Brazil) Atlético Mineiro	São Paulo, Brazil
21:30 UTC−3		Report		Stadium: Allianz Parque; Attendance: 40,433; Referee: Wilmar Roldán (Colombia)
	Penalties
	Veiga (penalty scored); Gómez (penalty scored); Zé Rafael (penalty scored); Piquerez (penalty scored); Rony (penalty scored); Murilo (penalty scored)		(penalty scored) Hulk; (penalty scored) Fernández; (penalty scored) Jair; (penalty scored) Sasha; (penalty scored) Alonso; (penalty missed) Rubens

=== Campeonato Brasileiro ===
==== Standings ====
Pos	Team	Pld	W	D	L	GF	GA	GD	Pts	Qualification or relegation
5	Flamengo	38	18	8	12	60	39	+21	62	Qualification for Copa Libertadores group stage (Note: Flamengo qualified for the Copa Libertadores group stage by winning the 2022 Copa Libertadores. Since they also won the 2022 Copa do Brasil, the berth awarded to the Copa do Brasil champions (Copa Libertadores group stage) was passed over to the league's best placed team not already qualified.)
6	Athletico Paranaense	38	16	10	12	48	48	0	58	Qualification for Copa Libertadores group stage
7	Atlético Mineiro	38	15	13	10	45	37	+8	58	Qualification for Copa Libertadores second stage
8	Fortaleza	38	15	10	13	46	39	+7	55	Qualification for Copa Libertadores second stage
9	São Paulo	38	13	15	10	55	42	+13	54	Qualification for Copa Sudamericana group stage

Source: CBF
Rules for classification: 1) points; 2) wins; 3) goal difference; 4) goals scored; 5) head-to-head results (only between two teams); 6) fewest red cards; 7) fewest yellow cards; 8) drawing of lots.

==== Result by round ====
Round	1	2	3	4	5	6	7	8	9	10	11	12	13	14	15	16	17	18	19	20	21	22	23	24	25	26	27	28	29	30	31	32	33	34	35	36	37	38
Result	W	W	D	D	L	W	D	W	D	L	D	D	W	W	W	D	W	D	L	L	L	W	L	D	W	D	L	L	W	W	D	L	D	W	D	L	W	W
Position	4	2	2	3	7	2	4	2	3	4	6	6	4	5	3	4	2	3	4	7	7	7	7	7	7	7	7	7	7	7	7	7	7	7	7	8	7	7

Source: CBF
P = Postponed

==== Matches ====
10 April 1	Atlético Mineiro	2–0	Internacional	Belo Horizonte
16:00 UTC−3	Hulk 10', 90+3'	Report		Stadium: Mineirão; Attendance: 37,531; Referee: Bruno Arleu de Araújo

17 April 2	Athletico Paranaense	0–1	Atlético Mineiro	Curitiba
18:00 UTC−3		Report	Zaracho 49'	Stadium: Arena da Baixada; Referee: Wilton Pereira Sampaio

23 April 3	Atlético Mineiro	2–2	Coritiba	Belo Horizonte
21:00 UTC−3	Savarino 23', 36'	Report	Igor Paixão 62'; Adrián Martínez 78'	Stadium: Independência; Referee: Sávio Pereira Sampaio

30 April 4	Goiás	2–2	Atlético Mineiro	Goiânia
18:30 UTC−3	Apodi 53'; Élvis 80' (pen.)	Report	Hulk 39'; Vargas 56'	Stadium: Estádio da Serrinha; Referee: Bruno Arleu de Araújo

7 May 5	Atlético Mineiro	1–2	América Mineiro	Belo Horizonte
16:30 UTC−3	Nacho Fernández 69'	Report	Maidana 7' (pen.); Cáceres 81'	Stadium: Independência; Referee: Wilton Pereira Sampaio

11 May 7	Red Bull Bragantino	1–1	Atlético Mineiro	Bragança Paulista
20:30 UTC−3	Ytalo 13'	Report	Nacho Fernández 66'	Stadium: Estádio Nabi Abi Chedid; Attendance: 5,222; Referee: Bráulio da Silva Machado

14 May 6	Atlético Mineiro	2–0	Atlético Goianiense	Belo Horizonte
19:00 UTC−3	Marlon Freitas 14' (o.g.); Hulk 72'	Report		Stadium: Independência; Referee: Anderson Daronco

29 May 8	Atlético Mineiro	2–1	Avaí	Belo Horizonte
19:00 UTC−3	Hulk 53'; Sasha 66'	Report	Morato 41'	Stadium: Mineirão; Attendance: 31,551; Referee: Jefferson Moraes

5 June 9	Palmeiras	0–0	Atlético Mineiro	São Paulo
16:00 UTC−3		Report		Stadium: Allianz Parque; Attendance: 40,235; Referee: Wilton Pereira Sampaio

8 June 10	Fluminense	5–3	Atlético Mineiro	Rio de Janeiro
21:30 UTC−3	Jhon Arias 18'; Cano 29', 58'; Samuel Xavier 37'; Luiz Henrique 63'	Report	Hulk 35'; Jair 45+4'; Sasha 54'	Stadium: Maracanã; Attendance: 16,143; Referee: Leandro Vuaden

11 June 11	Atlético Mineiro	1–1	Santos	Belo Horizonte
19:00 UTC−3	Sávio 6'	Report	Rwan 84' (pen.)	Stadium: Mineirão; Attendance: 26,299; Referee: Marcelo de Lima Henrique

15 June 12	Ceará	0–0	Atlético Mineiro	Fortaleza
19:00 UTC−3		Report		Stadium: Arena Castelão; Attendance: 26,774; Referee: Luiz Flávio de Oliveira

19 June 13	Atlético Mineiro	2–0	Flamengo	Belo Horizonte
16:00 UTC−3	Nacho Fernández 35'; Ademir 85'	Report		Stadium: Mineirão; Attendance: 55,373; Referee: Raphael Claus

25 June 14	Atlético Mineiro	3–2	Fortaleza	Belo Horizonte
21:00 UTC−3	Rubens 76'; Réver 87'; Matheus Jussa 90+6' (o.g.)	Report	Romarinho 3', 29'	Stadium: Mineirão; Attendance: 30,003; Referee: Jean Pierre Gonçalves Lima

2 July 15	Juventude	1–2	Atlético Mineiro	Caxias do Sul
16:30 UTC−3	Moraes 76'	Report	Hulk 30' (pen.); Sasha 56'	Stadium: Estádio Alfredo Jaconi; Attendance: 6,565; Referee: Flávio Rodrigues de Souza

10 July 16	Atlético Mineiro	0–0	São Paulo	Belo Horizonte
18:00 UTC−3		Report		Stadium: Mineirão; Attendance: 52,356; Referee: Anderson Daronco

17 July 17	Botafogo	0–1	Atlético Mineiro	Rio de Janeiro
18:00 UTC−3		Report	Zaracho 55'	Stadium: Estádio Nilton Santos; Attendance: 8,678; Referee: Raphael Claus

21 July 18	Cuiabá	1–1	Atlético Mineiro	Cuiabá
19:00 UTC−3	Gabriel Pirani 90+9'	Report	Alan Kardec 90+4'	Stadium: Arena Pantanal; Referee: Jean Pierre Gonçalves Lima

24 July 19	Atlético Mineiro	1–2	Corinthians	Belo Horizonte
18:00 UTC−3	Keno 9'	Report	Fábio Santos 80', 86' (pen.)	Stadium: Mineirão; Attendance: 55,706; Referee: Ramon Abatti Abel

31 July 20	Internacional	3–0	Atlético Mineiro	Porto Alegre
16:00 UTC−3	Maurício 7', 30'; Wanderson 24'	Report		Stadium: Estádio Beira-Rio; Attendance: 39,451; Referee: Flávio Rodrigues de Souza

7 August 21	Atlético Mineiro	2–3	Athletico Paranaense	Belo Horizonte
19:00 UTC−3	Igor Rabello 30'; Pavón 51'	Report	Vitor Roque 46', 56'; Canobbio 90+6'	Stadium: Mineirão; Attendance: 25,119; Referee: Bráulio da Silva Machado

14 August 22	Coritiba	0–1	Atlético Mineiro	Curitiba
11:00 UTC−3		Report	Alan Kardec 90+4'	Stadium: Estádio Couto Pereira; Referee: Marcelo de Lima Henrique

20 August 23	Atlético Mineiro	0–1	Goiás	Belo Horizonte
16:30 UTC−3		Report	Pedro Raul 51'	Stadium: Mineirão; Attendance: 31,650; Referee: Vinícius Gonçalves Dias Araújo

28 August 24	América Mineiro	1–1	Atlético Mineiro	Belo Horizonte
16:00 UTC−3	Henrique Almeida 19'	Report	Hulk 10'	Stadium: Independência; Attendance: 7,016; Referee: Ramon Abatti Abel

4 September 25	Atlético Goianiense	0–2	Atlético Mineiro	Goiânia
18:00 UTC−3		Report	Keno 45+5'; Hulk 58'	Stadium: Estádio Antônio Accioly; Attendance: 7,083; Referee: Luiz Flávio de Oliveira

7 September 26	Atlético Mineiro	1–1	Red Bull Bragantino	Belo Horizonte
17:00 UTC−3	Ademir 17'	Report	Aderlan 31'	Stadium: Mineirão; Attendance: 34,941; Referee: Jean Pierre Gonçalves Lima

17 September 27	Avaí	1–0	Atlético Mineiro	Florianópolis
16:30 UTC−3	Bissoli 54' (pen.)	Report		Stadium: Estádio da Ressacada; Attendance: 10,816; Referee: André Luiz de Freitas Castro

28 September 28	Atlético Mineiro	0–1	Palmeiras	Belo Horizonte
21:45 UTC−3		Report	Murilo 51'	Stadium: Mineirão; Attendance: 28,644; Referee: Marcelo de Lima Henrique

1 October 29	Atlético Mineiro	2–0	Fluminense	Belo Horizonte
15:00 UTC−3	Hulk 41', 65' (pen.)	Report		Stadium: Mineirão; Attendance: 20,858; Referee: Luiz Flávio de Oliveira

5 October 30	Santos	1–2	Atlético Mineiro	São Paulo
21:30 UTC−3	Marcos Leonardo 88' (pen.)	Report	Hulk 72'; Nacho Fernández 90+2' (pen.)	Stadium: Vila Belmiro; Attendance: 9,278; Referee: Bruno Arleu de Araújo

9 October 31	Atlético Mineiro	0–0	Ceará	Belo Horizonte
18:00 UTC−3		Report		Stadium: Mineirão; Attendance: 34,718; Referee: Flávio Rodrigues de Souza

15 October 32	Flamengo	1–0	Atlético Mineiro	Rio de Janeiro
20:30 UTC−3	Everton 38'	Report		Stadium: Maracanã; Attendance: 51,179; Referee: Ramon Abatti Abel

24 October 33	Fortaleza	0–0	Atlético Mineiro	Fortaleza
20:00 UTC−3		Report		Stadium: Arena Castelão; Attendance: 43,660; Referee: Raphael Claus

27 October 34	Atlético Mineiro	1–0	Juventude	Belo Horizonte
21:30 UTC−3	Dodô 12'	Report		Stadium: Mineirão; Attendance: 18,298; Referee: Sávio Pereira Sampaio

1 November 35	São Paulo	2–2	Atlético Mineiro	São Paulo
21:30 UTC−3	Calleri 40', 45+5'	Report	Vargas 25' (pen.), 81'	Stadium: Morumbi; Attendance: 23,835; Referee: Bráulio da Silva Machado

7 November 36	Atlético Mineiro	0–2	Botafogo	Belo Horizonte
20:00 UTC−3		Report	Victor Sá 76'; Tiquinho Soares 84'	Stadium: Mineirão; Attendance: 31,160; Referee: Leandro Vuaden

10 November 37	Atlético Mineiro	3–0	Cuiabá	Belo Horizonte
20:00 UTC−3	Keno 4', 45'; Vargas 56'	Report		Stadium: Mineirão; Attendance: 28,824; Referee: Bruno Arleu de Araújo

13 November 38	Corinthians	0–1	Atlético Mineiro	São Paulo
16:00 UTC−3		Report	Vargas 45' (pen.)	Stadium: Neo Química Arena; Attendance: 43,696; Referee: Bráulio da Silva Machado

=== Copa do Brasil ===
==== Third round ====
20 April First leg	Atlético Mineiro	3–0	Brasiliense	Belo Horizonte
19:00 UTC−3	Sasha 4', 9', 40'	Report		Stadium: Mineirão; Attendance: 20,062; Referee: Thiago Luis Scarascati

22 May Second leg	Brasiliense	0–1 (0–4 agg.)	Atlético Mineiro	Cariacica
19:00 UTC−3		Report	Fábio Gomes 17'	Stadium: Estádio Kléber Andrade; Referee: Douglas Marques das Flores

==== Round of 16 ====
22 June First leg	Atlético Mineiro	2–1	Flamengo	Belo Horizonte
21:30 UTC−3	Hulk 7'; Ademir 55'	Report	Lázaro 80'	Stadium: Mineirão; Attendance: 53,953; Referee: Luiz Flávio de Oliveira

13 July Second leg	Flamengo	2–0 (3–2 agg.)	Atlético Mineiro	Rio de Janeiro
21:30 UTC−3	Arrascaeta 45+4', 64'	Report		Stadium: Maracanã; Attendance: 68,747; Referee: Wilton Pereira Sampaio

=== Supercopa do Brasil ===
Atlético Mineiro qualified for the 2022 Supercopa do Brasil by winning the 2021 Campeonato Brasileiro Série A and the 2021 Copa do Brasil.

20 February	Atlético Mineiro	2–2 (8–7 p)	Flamengo	Cuiabá
16:00 UTC−3	Nacho Fernández 42'; Hulk 75'	Report	Gabriel 56'; Bruno Henrique 64'	Stadium: Arena Pantanal; Attendance: 32,028; Referee: Anderson Daronco
	Penalties
	Hulk (penalty scored); Nacho Fernández (penalty scored); Ademir (penalty scored); Arana (penalty scored); Vargas (penalty scored); Guga (penalty missed); Jair (penalty scored); Everson (penalty missed); Nathan Silva (penalty scored); Mariano (penalty missed); Godín (penalty missed); Hulk (penalty scored)		(penalty scored) Lázaro; (penalty scored) Vitinho; (penalty scored) Diego; (penalty scored) David Luiz; (penalty scored) Gabriel; (penalty missed) Arão; (penalty scored) João Gomes; (penalty missed) Matheuzinho; (penalty scored) Léo Pereira; (penalty missed) Fabrício Bruno; (penalty missed) Hugo Souza; (penalty missed) Vitinho

== Statistics ==
=== Squad appearances and goals ===
No.	Pos	Nat	Player	Total		Brasileiro		Mineiro		Copa do Brasil		Libertadores		Supercopa	
No.	Pos	Nat	Player	Apps	Goals	Apps	Goals	Apps	Goals	Apps	Goals	Apps	Goals	Apps	Goals
Goalkeepers
1	GK	(Brazil) BRA	Gabriel Delfim	0	0	0	0	0	0	0	0	0	0	0	0
22	GK	(Brazil) BRA	Everson	58	0	37	0	8	0	3	0	9	0	1	0
31	GK	(Brazil) BRA	Matheus Mendes	0	0	0	0	0	0	0	0	0	0	0	0
32	GK	(Brazil) BRA	Rafael	9	0	1	0	6	0	1	0	1	0	0	0
Defenders
2	DF	(Brazil) BRA	Guga	39	0	19+3	0	8+1	0	1+1	0	3+2	0	0+1	0
3	DF	(Paraguay) PAR	Júnior Alonso	44	0	30+1	0	0+1	0	2	0	9+1	0	0	0
4	DF	(Brazil) BRA	Réver	30	1	10+5	1	8+1	0	2	0	1+3	0	0	0
6	DF	(Brazil) BRA	Dodô	16	1	11+2	1	3	0	0	0	0	0	0	0
13	DF	(Brazil) BRA	Guilherme Arana	42	3	19+1	0	9	2	3	0	9	1	1	0
16	DF	(Brazil) BRA	Igor Rabello	19	1	7	1	7+1	0	2+1	0	0+1	0	0	0
25	DF	(Brazil) BRA	Mariano	44	0	19+6	0	5+1	0	3	0	7+2	0	1	0
34	DF	(Brazil) BRA	Jemerson	12	0	12	0	0	0	0	0	0	0	0	0
40	DF	(Brazil) BRA	Nathan Silva	42	0	18+4	0	8	0	2	0	9	0	1	0
51	DF	(Brazil) BRA	Hiago	0	0	0	0	0	0	0	0	0	0	0	0
Midfielders
5	MF	(Brazil) BRA	Otávio	41	0	11+13	0	3+3	0	2+2	0	3+4	0	0	0
8	MF	(Brazil) BRA	Jair	48	1	26+5	1	8	0	1	0	7	0	1	0
15	MF	(Argentina) ARG	Matías Zaracho	43	2	24+2	2	6+3	0	2	0	5+1	0	0	0
26	MF	(Argentina) ARG	Ignacio Fernández	57	9	25+9	4	7+3	2	2	0	8+2	2	1	1
27	MF	(Brazil) BRA	Calebe	27	1	2+11	0	5+1	1	2+1	0	1+4	0	0	0
29	MF	(Brazil) BRA	Allan	53	0	31+2	0	8	0	3	0	8	0	1	0
37	MF	(Brazil) BRA	Pedrinho	8	0	1+6	0	0	0	0	0	0+1	0	0	0
41	MF	(Brazil) BRA	Neto	4	0	0	0	0+2	0	0+1	0	0+1	0	0	0
44	MF	(Brazil) BRA	Rubens	43	1	11+18	1	2+1	0	1+3	0	4+3	0	0	0
45	MF	(Brazil) BRA	Yan Phillipe	1	0	0+1	0	0	0	0	0	0	0	0	0
Forwards
7	FW	(Brazil) BRA	Hulk	46	29	24+1	12	6+2	10	2	1	10	5	1	1
10	FW	(Chile) CHI	Eduardo Vargas	39	6	13+11	5	3+1	1	2+1	0	3+4	0	0+1	0
11	FW	(Brazil) BRA	Keno	43	5	22+7	4	7+1	1	1+1	0	2+1	0	1	0
14	FW	(Brazil) BRA	Alan Kardec	13	2	0+12	2	0	0	0	0	0+1	0	0	0
18	FW	(Brazil) BRA	Eduardo Sasha	47	12	16+11	3	8+4	5	2	3	1+5	1	0	0
19	FW	(Brazil) BRA	Ademir	61	8	15+20	2	6+7	3	1+2	1	6+3	2	0+1	0
28	FW	(Brazil) BRA	Felipe Felicio	3	0	0	0	0+2	0	0+1	0	0	0	0	0
30	FW	(Argentina) ARG	Cristian Pavón	18	1	7+11	1	0	0	0	0	0	0	0	0
Players who have made an appearance this season but have left the club
9	FW	(Brazil) BRA	Fábio Gomes	16	3	1+4	0	3+5	2	1+1	1	0+1	0	0	0
14	DF	(Uruguay) URU	Diego Godín	9	1	1	0	3+1	1	1	0	2	0	1	0
17	FW	(Venezuela) VEN	Jefferson Savarino	16	4	1+2	2	3+6	2	1	0	1+1	0	1	0
23	MF	(Brazil) BRA	Guilherme Castilho	10	0	2+2	0	1+3	0	0+2	0	0	0	0	0
30	MF	(Colombia) COL	Dylan Borrero	11	1	0	0	4+6	1	0	0	1	0	0	0
33	FW	(Brazil) BRA	Sávio	14	2	2+6	1	1+1	0	1+1	0	0+2	1	0	0
34	DF	(Brazil) BRA	Vitor Mendes	3	0	0	0	3	0	0	0	0	0	0	0
37	MF	(Brazil) BRA	Tchê Tchê	8	1	0	0	4+3	0	0	0	0+1	1	0	0
45	DF	(Brazil) BRA	Micael	1	0	0	0	0+1	0	0	0	0	0	0	0
48	FW	(Brazil) BRA	Echaporã	3	0	0	0	1+2	0	0	0	0	0	0	0
