= João Lourenço (footballer, born 2005) =

Brazilian footballer (born 2005)

Personal information
- Full name: João Pedro Silverio Lourenço
- Date of birth: 15 July 2005 (age 21)
- Place of birth: Paraíba do Sul, Rio de Janeiro, Brazil
- Positions: Midfielder; forward

Youth career
- 2015–2023: Fluminense

Senior career*
Years	Team	Apps	(Gls)
2023–2024	Fluminense	1	(0)
- * Club domestic league appearances and goals as of 4 March 2023

João Pedro Silverio Lourenço (born 15 July 2005) is a Brazilian footballer who plays as a midfielder for Fluminense.

== Early Career and Arrival at Fluminense ==
João Lourenço, a player from Xerém and a pivotal member of the under-17 team, provided insights into his journey in an interview with the club's official TV channel. The 17-year-old forward expressed gratitude for the invaluable experiences gained at Tricolor.

"I used to play in a local soccer school in my city (Paraíba do Sul) called Riachuelo. Later, I moved to one in Nova Friburgo, a city known for its rich football culture," he recounted, as documented in about the football history of Nova Friburgo.

"I came for a trial, performed well, scored goals, and got the call. Afterward, I was approved," he continued.

"I've always been addicted to football, even quite greedy when I was younger. Being here at Fluminense has been a fantastic process, and I highly value it," he added.

João Lourenço's early career, shaped by dedication and passion, laid the foundation for his impactful journey with Fluminense.

== Club career ==
João Lourenço began his professional journey with Fluminense at the age of nine, joining in 2015. He committed to the club by he signing his inaugural professional contract in August 2021, marking a significant step in his evolving football career.

== Contract Extension ==
On November 17, 2023, Fluminense announced the extension of João Lourenço's contract. The 18-year-old forward, affectionately known as the "Moleque de Xerém," officially renewed his commitment to the club at the Vale das Laranjeiras Training Center. The new agreement, valid until the end of 2026, features a release clause set at 50 million euros. In a statement, João Lourenço expressed his gratitude, saying, "Incredible feeling. I am very happy to renew my contract with the club that opened doors for me and that I love. I can only thank God, my family, and friends for being my support. Now, another challenge. It's about continuing to work hard to achieve many titles wearing the tricolor jersey."

== Career statistics ==
=== Club ===
As of 17 November 2023

Appearances, goals, and assists by competition (playing for Fluminense)
Competition	Appearances	Goals	Substitutions on	Substitutions off	Yellow Cards	Minutes Per Goal	Minutes Played
Brazil CBF Brasileiro U20	9	2	5	4	2	226'	451'
Brazil Copinha	4	1	1	2	1	252'	252'
Brazil Carioca - Taça Guanabara	1		1				2'
