= Lima (footballer, born 1996) =

Brazilian footballer

Personal information
- Full name: Vinícius Moreira de Lima
- Date of birth: 11 June 1996 (age 30)
- Place of birth: Araçatuba, Brazil
- Height: 1.81 m (5 ft 11 in)
- Position: Attacking midfielder

Team information
- Current team: Santos (on loan from Fluminense)
- Number: 45

Youth career
- 2012: Tanabi
- 2013–2015: Grêmio

Senior career*
| Years | Team | Apps | (Gls) |
| 2015–2021 | Grêmio | 18 | (0) |
| 2015–2016 | → Mallorca B (loan) | 13 | (3) |
| 2017 | → Ceará (loan) | 22 | (5) |
| 2018–2019 | → Al-Wasl (loan) | 24 | (1) |
| 2019–2021 | → Ceará (loan) | 49 | (9) |
| 2021–2022 | Ceará | 66 | (6) |
| 2023– | Fluminense | 124 | (13) |
| 2026 | → América (loan) | 12 | (1) |
| 2026– | → Santos (loan) | 5 | (0) |
- * Club domestic league appearances and goals as of 21:59, 29 October 2026 (UTC)

Vinicius Moreira de Lima (born 11 June 1996), known as Lima, is a Brazilian footballer who plays for Brazilian Série A club Santos, on loan from Fluminense. Mainly an attacking midfielder, he can also play as a winger or a central midfielder.

== Career ==
=== Grêmio ===
Born in Araçatuba, São Paulo, Lima joined Grêmio's youth setup in 2013, after starting it out at Tanabi.

==== Loan to Mallorca ====
On 17 July 2015, Lima was loaned to Spanish Segunda División side RCD Mallorca, in a season-long deal. Initially a member of the Bermellones' first team, he was not registered in the squad, and was only assigned to the reserves in Tercera División in January 2016. He made his senior debut on 31 January of that year by starting in a 0–0 home draw against CE Constància, and scored his first goal on 13 February in a 2–0 home win against UD Alaró.

==== Breakthrough ====
Lima subsequently returned to Grêmio (which refused a € 1 million offer from Mallorca) in July 2016, and was included in the first team by manager Roger Machado. He only made his first team debut on 2 March of the following year, starting in a 1–1 Primeira Liga home draw against Ceará.

Lima made his Série A debut on 28 May 2017, coming on as a second-half substitute for fellow youth graduate Careca in a 3–4 loss at Sport Recife.

==== Loan to Ceará ====
On 24 July 2017, after just one further league match for Grêmio, Lima was loaned to Ceará for the remainder of the year. He scored his first professional goal on 12 August, netting the winner in a 1–0 home success over CRB, and netted a further four times as the club achieved promotion to the top tier.

==== 2018 season ====
Back to Grêmio for the 2018 season, Lima was initially a starter as the club's main players were on vacation, and renewed his contract until December 2021 on 4 May.

==== Loan to Al-Wasl ====
After falling down the pecking order, Lima moved abroad on 28 July 2018, joining UAE Pro League side Al-Wasl on a one-year loan deal. He was a regular starter for the side, but his buyout clause was not exercised.

=== Ceará return ===
On 13 July 2019, Lima returned to Ceará, again on loan. The following 29 January, his loan was extended for a further year, and he helped the club to win the 2020 Copa do Nordeste despite only featuring in five matches during the competition.

On 18 March 2021, Lima signed a permanent contract with Vozão until December 2023. He quickly established himself as an undisputed starter for the club in the following two seasons, but suffered relegation in 2022.

=== Fluminense ===
On 20 December 2022, Lima agreed to a three-year deal with Fluminense also in the first division. Regularly used, he featured in 11 matches in the club's 2023 Copa Libertadores run, helping them in their first-ever title in the competition.

In January 2025, Lima renewed his link with Flu until the end of 2027. Despite featuring regularly in the 2025 FIFA Club World Cup where the club reached the semi-finals, he lost space under new head coach Luis Zubeldía.

==== Loan to América ====
On 10 February 2026, Lima was loaned to Liga MX side Club América, with a buyout clause. He never managed to establish himself as a regular starter in the side, but featured in all but one match after arriving.

==== Loan to Santos ====
On 4 September 2026, Santos announced the signing of Lima on loan until the end of the year. He made his club debut two days later, replacing Gabriel Bontempo in a 3–2 away win over Internacional.

== Career statistics ==
As of 29 October 2026

| Club | Season | League | | | State League | | Cup | | Continental | | Other | | Total | |
| Club | Season | Division | Apps | Goals | Apps | Goals | Apps | Goals | Apps | Goals | Apps | Goals | Apps | Goals |
|---|---|---|---|---|---|---|---|---|---|---|---|---|---|---|
| Mallorca B | 2015–16 | Tercera División | 13 | 3 | — | | — | | — | | 1 (Note: Appearance in Tercera División play-offs) | 0 | 14 | 3 |
| Grêmio | 2016 | Série A | 0 | 0 | — | | — | | — | | — | | 0 | 0 |
| Grêmio | 2017 | Série A | 2 | 0 | 0 | 0 | — | | — | | 1 (Note: Appearance in Primeira Liga) | 0 | 3 | 0 |
| Grêmio | 2018 | Série A | 9 | 0 | 7 | 0 | 1 | 0 | 2 (Note: Appearances in Copa Libertadores) | 0 | 2 (Note: Appearances in Recopa Sudamericana) | 0 | 21 | 0 |
| Grêmio | Total | | 11 | 0 | 7 | 0 | 1 | 0 | 2 | 0 | 3 | 0 | 24 | 0 |
| Ceará (loan) | 2017 | Série B | 22 | 5 | — | | — | | — | | — | | 22 | 5 |
| Al-Wasl (loan) | 2018–19 | UAE Pro League | 24 | 1 | — | | 3 | 0 | — | | 8 (Note: Six appearances and two goals in UAE League Cup, two appearances in Arab Club Champions Cup) | 2 | 35 | 3 |
| Ceará | 2019 | Série A | 15 | 1 | — | | — | | — | | — | | 15 | 1 |
| Ceará | 2020 | Série A | 31 | 6 | 3 | 2 | 6 | 1 | — | | 5 (Note: Appearances in Copa do Nordeste) | 0 | 45 | 9 |
| Ceará | 2021 | Série A | 33 | 3 | 2 | 0 | 1 | 0 | 5 (Note: Appearances in Copa Sudamericana) | 1 | 6 | 0 | 47 | 4 |
| Ceará | 2022 | Série A | 31 | 3 | 0 | 0 | 6 | 1 | 9 | 2 | 7 | 0 | 53 | 6 |
| Ceará | Total | | 110 | 13 | 5 | 2 | 13 | 2 | 14 | 3 | 18 | 0 | 160 | 20 |
| Fluminense | 2023 | Série A | 35 | 6 | 14 | 1 | 4 | 0 | 11 | 0 | 2 (Note: Appearances in FIFA Club World Cup) | 0 | 66 | 7 |
| Fluminense | 2024 | Série A | 30 | 4 | 7 | 0 | 3 | 1 | 10 | 2 | 1 | 0 | 51 | 7 |
| Fluminense | 2025 | Série A | 28 | 2 | 6 | 0 | 4 | 0 | 4 | 0 | 5 | 0 | 47 | 2 |
| Fluminense | 2026 | Série A | 1 | 0 | 3 | 0 | — | | — | | — | | 4 | 0 |
| Fluminense | Total | | 94 | 12 | 30 | 1 | 11 | 1 | 25 | 2 | 8 | 0 | 168 | 16 |
| América (loan) | 2025–26 | Liga MX | 12 | 1 | — | | — | | 4 (Note: Appearances in CONCACAF Champions Cup) | 0 | 0 | 0 | 16 | 1 |
| Santos | 2026 | Série A | 5 | 0 | — | | — | | 1 | 0 | — | | 6 | 0 |
| Career total | | | 291 | 35 | 42 | 3 | 28 | 3 | 46 | 5 | 38 | 2 | 444 | 48 |

== Honours ==
Grêmio

- Recopa Sudamericana: 2018

Ceará

- Copa do Nordeste: 2020

Fluminense

- Taça Guanabara: 2023
- Campeonato Carioca: 2023
- Copa Libertadores: 2023
- Recopa Sudamericana: 2024
