= Guga (footballer, born 1998) =

Brazilian footballer

Personal information
- Full name: Cláudio Rodrigues Gomes
- Date of birth: 29 August 1998 (age 28)
- Place of birth: Rio de Janeiro, Brazil
- Height: 1.73 m (5 ft 8 in)
- Position: Right back

Team information
- Current team: Fluminense
- Number: 23

Youth career
- 2008–2013: Botafogo
- 2013–2018: Avaí

Senior career*
Years	Team	Apps	(Gls)
2018	Avaí	51	(4)
2019–2022	Atlético Mineiro	158	(2)
2023–	Fluminense	84	(2)

International career^{‡}
2019–2021	Brazil U23	15	(1)
- * Club domestic league appearances and goals as of 6 April 2026 ‡ National team caps and goals as of 2 July 2021

Cláudio Rodrigues Gomes (born 29 August 1998), commonly known as Guga, is a Brazilian footballer who plays for Fluminense as a right back.

== Club career ==
Born in Rio de Janeiro, Guga started playing futsal at the age of five. After having spent five years with the youth setup of Botafogo, he joined the academy of Avaí in 2013 and signed a contract, which would keep him at the club till 2018. He played regularly for the reserves and scored three times in the 2017 Copa do Brasil Sub-20 against Grêmio, Fluminense and Palmeiras.

=== Avaí ===
On 8 January 2018, Guga was promoted to the senior team of Avaí and went on to participate in the pre-season held at Águas Mornas. On 15 February, he scored his first professional goal in a 3–1 victory against Brusque in Campeonato Catarinense. On 14 April, he made his Série B debut in a 1–0 defeat against Vila Nova. On 26 May, he scored his first Série B goal for the club in a 3–1 victory against Paysandu.

=== Altético Mineiro ===
On 28 December 2018, Guga signed with Atlético Mineiro.

=== Fluminense ===
On 14 December 2022, Guga joined Fluminense on a three-year deal.

== Personal life ==
Guga is nicknamed as Guga because of the similarity of his hair style with that of tennis player Gustavo Kuerten.

== Club statistics ==
As of match played 2 November 2025

Club	Season	League			State league		Copa do Brasil		Continental		Other		Total	
Club	Season	Division	Apps	Goals	Apps	Goals	Apps	Goals	Apps	Goals	Apps	Goals	Apps	Goals
Avaí	2018	Série B	36	3	1 (Note: Appearance(s) in Campeonato Catarinense)	1	0	0	—		—		37	4
Atlético Mineiro	2019	Série A	18	0	12 (Note: Appearance(s) in Campeonato Mineiro)	0	1	0	6 (Note: Five appearances in Copa Libertadores; One appearance in Copa Sudamericana)	0	—		37	0
Atlético Mineiro	2020	Série A	32	1	7	0	1	0	1 (Note: Appearance(s) in Copa Sudamericana)	0	—		41	1
Atlético Mineiro	2021	Série A	25	0	7	1	4	0	5 (Note: Appearance(s) in Copa Libertadores)	0	—		41	1
Atlético Mineiro	2022	Série A	22	0	10	0	2	0	5	0	1 (Note: Appearance(s) in Supercopa do Brasil)	0	40	0
Atlético Mineiro	Total		97	1	36	1	8	0	17	0	1	0	159	2
Fluminense	2023	Série A	22	1	9 (Note: Appearance(s) in Campeonato Carioca)	0	4	0	6	0	1 (Note: Appearance(s) in FIFA Club World Cup)	0	42	1
Fluminense	2024	Série A	10	0	6	0	3	0	6	0	2 (Note: Appearance(s) in Recopa Sudamericana)	0	27	0
Fluminense	2025	Série A	17	1	7	0	7	0	6	0	3	0	40	1
Fluminense	Total		49	2	22	0	14	0	18	0	6	0	109	2
Career total			182	6	59	2	22	0	35	0	7	0	305	8

== Honours ==
Atlético Mineiro

- Campeonato Brasileiro Série A: 2021
- Copa do Brasil: 2021
- Campeonato Mineiro: 2020, 2021, 2022
- Supercopa do Brasil: 2022

Fluminense

- Taça Guanabara: 2023
- Campeonato Carioca: 2023
- Copa Libertadores: 2023
- Recopa Sudamericana: 2024

Brazil U23

- Toulon Tournament: 2019
