= 2023 Campeonato Carioca =

Campeonato Carioca
- Season: 2023
- Dates: 12 January - 9 April 2023
- Champions: Fluminense (33rd title)
- Relegated: Resende
- 2024 Copa do Brasil: Audax Rio; Nova Iguaçu; Portuguesa; Vasco da Gama; Volta Redonda
- 2024 Série D: Audax Rio; Nova Iguaçu
- Matches: 78
- Goals: 198 (2.54 per match)
- Top goalscorer: Germán Cano (16 goals)

The 2023 Campeonato Carioca de Futebol (officially the Campeonato Carioca Betnacional 2023 for sponsorship reasons) was the 120th edition of the top division of football in the state of Rio de Janeiro. The competition was organized by FERJ. It began on 12 January 2023 and ended on 9 April 2023. Defending champions Fluminense successfully defended their title after winning 4–3 on aggregate against Flamengo.

== Participating teams ==
Location of teams in 2023 Campeonato Carioca
Location of teams in 2023 Campeonato Carioca – city of Rio de Janeiro

| Club | Home City (Note: Some clubs sold their home field advantage for some of their games to third parties, which means that some games were played in different states) | Manager | 2022 Result |
|---|---|---|---|
| Audax Rio de Janeiro Esporte Clube | Angra dos Reis | Júnior Lopes and Caio Couto | 8th |
| Bangu Atlético Clube | Rio de Janeiro (Bangu) | Felipe | 11th |
| Boavista Sport Club | Saquarema | Leandrão | 10th |
| Botafogo de Futebol e Regatas | Rio de Janeiro (Engenho de Dentro) (Note: Although Botafogo FR is headquartered in Botafogo, it plays home games at Engenhão Stadium) | Luís Castro | 4th |
| Clube de Regatas do Flamengo | Rio de Janeiro (Maracanã) (Note: Although CR Flamengo is headquartered in Lagoa, it plays home games at Maracanã Stadium) | Vítor Pereira | 2nd |
| Fluminense Football Club | Rio de Janeiro (Maracanã) (Note: Although Fluminense FC is headquartered in Laranjeiras, it plays home games at Maracanã Stadium) | Fernando Diniz | 1st |
| Madureira Esporte Clube | Rio de Janeiro (Madureira) | Felipe Arantes and Denis Alves | 9th |
| Nova Iguaçu Futebol Clube | Nova Iguaçu | Carlos Vitor | 6th |
| Associação Atlética Portuguesa | Rio de Janeiro (Governador Island) | Felipe Surian | 7th |
| Resende Futebol Clube | Resende | Sandro Sargentim | 5th |
| Club de Regatas Vasco da Gama | Rio de Janeiro (Vasco da Gama) | Maurício Barbieri | 3rd |
| Volta Redonda Futebol Clube | Volta Redonda | Rogério Corrêa | 1st (Série A2) |

== Format ==
In the main competition, the twelve clubs played each other in a single round-robin. This round-robin was the Taça Guanabara. The bottom team was relegated to the 2023 Série A2. While the top four clubs qualified for the final stage, the next four clubs (5th to 8th places) qualified for the Taça Rio. In the Taça Rio, the 5th-placed club faced the 8th-placed club, and the 6th-placed will face the 7th-placed. In the final stage, the winners of the Taça Guanabara faced the 4th-placed club, while the runners-up faced the 3rd-placed club. In both of these four-team brackets (the Taça Rio and the final stage), the semi-finals and finals were played over two legs, without the use of the away goals rule. In the semi-finals of both the Taça Rio and the final stage, the higher placed teams on the Taça Guanabara table advanced in case of an aggregate tie. In the finals of both brackets, there was no such advantage; in case of an aggregate tie, a penalty shoot-out would have taken place.

The top four teams of the Campeonato Carioca and the winner of the Taça Rio qualified for the 2024 Copa do Brasil. Since Fluminense also qualified for the 2024 Copa do Brasil via winning the 2023 Copa Libertadores, and Botafogo and Flamengo qualified for the 2024 Copa do Brasil via the 2023 Brasileirão, their Campeonato Carioca berths went to the next best team. The top two teams of the Campeonato Carioca that were not already playing in the Campeonato Brasileiro Série A, Série B or Série C qualified for the 2024 Série D.

== Taça Guanabara ==
| Pos | Team | Pld | W | D | L | GF | GA | GD | Pts | Qualification or relegation |
|---|---|---|---|---|---|---|---|---|---|---|
| 1 | Fluminense (C) | 11 | 8 | 1 | 2 | 20 | 4 | +16 | 25 | Taça Guanabara Champions and advance to semi-finals |
| 2 | Vasco da Gama | 11 | 7 | 2 | 2 | 20 | 6 | +14 | 23 | Advance to semi-finals |
| 3 | Flamengo | 11 | 7 | 2 | 2 | 19 | 6 | +13 | 23 | Advance to semi-finals |
| 4 | Volta Redonda | 11 | 6 | 2 | 3 | 27 | 15 | +12 | 20 | Advance to semi-finals |
| 5 | Botafogo | 11 | 6 | 1 | 4 | 13 | 6 | +7 | 19 | Advance to Taça Rio semi-finals |
| 6 | Audax Rio | 11 | 4 | 4 | 3 | 14 | 13 | +1 | 16 | Advance to Taça Rio semi-finals |
| 7 | Nova Iguaçu | 11 | 3 | 4 | 4 | 8 | 11 | −3 | 13 | Advance to Taça Rio semi-finals |
| 8 | Portuguesa | 11 | 3 | 4 | 4 | 9 | 14 | −5 | 13 | Advance to Taça Rio semi-finals |
| 9 | Bangu | 11 | 3 | 3 | 5 | 6 | 17 | −11 | 12 | |
| 10 | Madureira | 11 | 2 | 3 | 6 | 5 | 18 | −13 | 9 | |
| 11 | Boavista | 11 | 1 | 3 | 7 | 11 | 23 | −12 | 6 | |
| 12 | Resende (R) | 11 | 1 | 1 | 9 | 3 | 22 | −19 | 4 | Relegated to Série A2 |

Source: FERJ
Rules for classification: 1) points; 2) wins; 3) goal difference; 4) goals scored; 5) head-to-head results (only between two teams); 6) disciplinary record; 7) drawing of lots.
(C) Champions; (R) Relegated

2023 Taça Guanabara champions

12th title

== Taça Rio ==
Semi-finals
7 | Nova Iguaçu | 1 | 0 | 1
6 | Audax Rio | 1 | 1 | 2
8 | Portuguesa | 0 | 1 | 1
5 | Botafogo | 0 | 3 | 3

Finals
6 | Audax Rio | 1 | 2 | 3
5 | Botafogo | 2 | 5 | 7

2023 Taça Rio champions

8th title

== Final stage ==
Semi-finals
3 | Flamengo | 3 | 3 | 6
2 | Vasco da Gama | 2 | 1 | 3
4 | Volta Redonda | 2 | 0 | 2
1 | Fluminense | 1 | 7 | 8

Finals
3 | Flamengo | 2 | 1 | 3
1 | Fluminense | 0 | 4 | 4

=== Semi-finals ===
==== Group A ====
12 March 2023
18:00

| Volta Redonda | 2–1 | Fluminense |
|---|---|---|
| Pedrinho 29'; Lelê 52' | Report | Nino 81' |

Estádio Raulino de Oliveira, Volta Redonda
Attendance: 6,881
Referee: Yuri Elino Ferreira da Cruz

18 March 2023
16:00

| Fluminense | 7–0 | Volta Redonda |
|---|---|---|
| Samuel Xavier 4'; Cano 8', 45+5', 64' (pen.), 90'; Alexsander 26'; Matheus Martinelli 42' | Report |

Maracanã, Rio de Janeiro
Attendance: 46,874
Referee: Wagner do Nascimento Magalhães

==== Group B ====
13 March 2023
21:10

| Flamengo | 3–2 | Vasco da Gama |
|---|---|---|
| De Arrascaeta 26'; Pedro 42'; Fabrício Bruno 73' | Report | Gabriel Pec 11'; Alex Teixeira 59' |

Maracanã, Rio de Janeiro
Attendance: 45,093
Referee: Wagner do Nascimento Magalhães

19 March 2023
18:00

| Vasco da Gama | 1–3 | Flamengo |
|---|---|---|
| Capasso 31' | Report | Pedro 16', 84' (pen.); Ayrton Lucas 90+5' |

Maracanã, Rio de Janeiro
Attendance: 49,779
Referee: Bruno Arleu de Araújo

=== Finals ===
1 April 2023
20:30

| Flamengo | 2–0 | Fluminense |
|---|---|---|
| Ayrton Lucas 50'; Pedro 67' | Report |

Maracanã, Rio de Janeiro
Attendance: 65,234
Referee: Wagner do Nascimento Magalhães

| Flamengo | Fluminense |

| GK | 1 | (Brazil) Santos |
| DF | 2 | (Uruguay) Guillermo Varela |
| DF | 15 | (Brazil) Fabrício Bruno |
| DF | 23 | (Brazil) David Luiz (c) |
| DF | 4 | (Brazil) Léo Pereira | (yellow card) 53' | (substituted off) 65' |
| DF | 6 | (Brazil) Ayrton Lucas | (yellow card) 90+5' |
| MF | 8 | (Brazil) Thiago Maia | (yellow card) 27' | (substituted off) 65' |
| MF | 20 | (Brazil) Gerson | | (substituted off) 89' |
| MF | 42 | (Brazil) Matheus França | | (substituted off) 65' |
| FW | 11 | (Brazil) Everton | | (substituted off) 65' |
| FW | 9 | (Brazil) Pedro | (yellow card) 88' |
Substitutes:
| GK | 25 | (Brazil) Matheus Cunha |
| DF | 3 | (Brazil) Rodrigo Caio |
| DF | 16 | (Brazil) Filipe Luís | | (substituted on) 65' |
| DF | 43 | (Brazil) Wesley |
| MF | 7 | (Brazil) Éverton Ribeiro | | (substituted on) 65' |
| MF | 29 | (Brazil) Victor Hugo |
| MF | 32 | (Chile) Arturo Vidal | | (substituted on) 65' |
| MF | 40 | (Brazil) Matheus Gonçalves | | (substituted on) 89' |
| MF | 48 | (Brazil) Igor Jesus |
| FW | 10 | (Brazil) Gabriel Barbosa | | (substituted on) 65' |
| FW | 31 | (Brazil) Marinho |
| FW | 46 | (Brazil) Mateusão |
Coach:
(Portugal) Vítor Pereira

| GK | 1 | (Brazil) Fábio |
| DF | 2 | (Brazil) Samuel Xavier | (red card) 69' |
| DF | 33 | (Brazil) Nino (c) |
| DF | 44 | (Brazil) David Braz | | (substituted off) 66' |
| DF | 5 | (Brazil) Alexsander |
| MF | 7 | (Brazil) André | (yellow card) 90+5' |
| MF | 8 | (Brazil) Martinelli | | (substituted off) 81' |
| MF | 10 | (Brazil) Ganso | (yellow card) 9' | (substituted off) 74' |
| FW | 21 | (Colombia) Jhon Arias |
| FW | 11 | (Brazil) Keno | | (substituted off) 46' |
| FW | 14 | (Argentina) Germán Cano |
Substitutes:
| GK | 22 | (Brazil) Pedro Rangel | (yellow card) 25' |
| GK | 98 | (Brazil) Vitor Eudes |
| DF | 4 | (Brazil) Vitor Mendes | | | (substituted on) 74' |
| DF | 12 | (Brazil) Marcelo |
| DF | 23 | (Brazil) Guga | | (substituted on) 74' |
| MF | 19 | (Brazil) Alexandre Jesus |
| MF | 20 | (Brazil) Gabriel Pirani | | (substituted on) 46' | (substituted off) 74' |
| MF | 30 | (Brazil) Felipe Melo | | (substituted on) 81' |
| MF | 37 | (Brazil) Giovanni |
| MF | 45 | (Brazil) Lima | | (substituted on) 66' |
| FW | 9 | (Brazil) John Kennedy |
| FW | 18 | (China) Alan |
Coach:
| (Brazil) Fernando Diniz | | | | (red card) 70' |

Assistant referees:
Luiz Claudio Regazone
Michael Correia
Fourth official:
Maurício Machado Coelho Júnior
Fifth official:
Diego Luiz Couto Barcelos
Video assistant referee:
Carlos Eduardo Nunes Braga
Assistant video assistant referees:
Rodrigo Carvalhaes de Miranda
Carlos Henrique Cardoso de Souza

9 April 2023
18:00

| Fluminense | 4–1 | Flamengo |
|---|---|---|
| Marcelo 27'; Cano 31', 55'; Alexsander 64' | Report | Ayrton Lucas 90+5' |

Maracanã, Rio de Janeiro
Attendance: 66,969
Referee: Bruno Arleu de Araújo

| Fluminense | Flamengo |

| GK | 1 | (Brazil) Fábio |
| DF | 23 | (Brazil) Guga |
| DF | 33 | (Brazil) Nino (c) |
| DF | 30 | (Brazil) Felipe Melo | | (substituted off) 63' |
| DF | 12 | (Brazil) Marcelo | (yellow card) 51' | (substituted off) 79' |
| MF | 7 | (Brazil) André | (yellow card) 29' |
| MF | 5 | (Brazil) Alexsander | (yellow card) 84' |
| MF | 10 | (Brazil) Ganso | | (substituted off) 79' |
| FW | 21 | (Colombia) Jhon Arias |
| FW | 11 | (Brazil) Keno | | (substituted off) 71' |
| FW | 14 | (Argentina) Germán Cano |
Substitutes:
| GK | 22 | (Brazil) Pedro Rangel |
| GK | 98 | (Brazil) Vitor Eudes |
| DF | 4 | (Brazil) Vitor Mendes | | (substituted on) 63' |
| DF | 13 | (Brazil) Felipe Andrade |
| DF | 26 | (Brazil) Manoel |
| DF | 44 | (Brazil) David Braz | (yellow card) 90+1' | (substituted on) 79' |
| MF | 19 | (Brazil) Alexandre Jesus |
| MF | 20 | (Brazil) Gabriel Pirani | | (substituted on) 79' |
| MF | 37 | (Brazil) Giovanni |
| MF | 45 | (Brazil) Lima | | (substituted on) 71' |
| FW | 9 | (Brazil) John Kennedy |
| FW | 18 | (China) Alan |
Coach:
(Brazil) Eduardo Barros (assistant)

| GK | 1 | (Brazil) Santos |
| DF | 2 | (Uruguay) Guillermo Varela |
| DF | 15 | (Brazil) Fabrício Bruno | | (substituted off) 81' |
| DF | 23 | (Brazil) David Luiz |
| DF | 4 | (Brazil) Léo Pereira | (yellow card) 41' | (substituted off) 46' |
| DF | 6 | (Brazil) Ayrton Lucas |
| MF | 8 | (Brazil) Thiago Maia | | (substituted off) 72' |
| MF | 20 | (Brazil) Gerson | (yellow card) 90+1' |
| FW | 10 | (Brazil) Gabriel Barbosa (c) | | (substituted off) 46' |
| FW | 9 | (Brazil) Pedro |
| FW | 11 | (Brazil) Everton | | (substituted off) 81' |
Substitutes:
| GK | 25 | (Brazil) Matheus Cunha |
| DF | 3 | (Brazil) Rodrigo Caio |
| DF | 16 | (Brazil) Filipe Luís | | (substituted on) 81' |
| DF | 30 | (Brazil) Pablo |
| DF | 43 | (Brazil) Wesley |
| MF | 7 | (Brazil) Éverton Ribeiro | (yellow card) 90+4' | (substituted on) 46' |
| MF | 29 | (Brazil) Victor Hugo | | (substituted on) 72' |
| MF | 40 | (Brazil) Matheus Gonçalves | | (substituted on) 81' |
| MF | 42 | (Brazil) Matheus França | | (substituted on) 46' |
| MF | 48 | (Brazil) Igor Jesus |
| FW | 27 | (Brazil) Bruno Henrique |
| FW | 31 | (Brazil) Marinho |
Coach:
(Portugal) Vítor Pereira

Assistant referees:
Rodrigo Figueiredo Henrique Corrêa
Thiago Henrique Neto Corrêa Farinha
Fourth official:
João Batista de Arruda
Fifth official:
Daniel de Oliveira Alves Pereira
Video assistant referee:
Rodrigo Nunes de Sá
Assistant video assistant referees:
Philip Georg Bennett
Diogo Carvalho Silva

2023 Campeonato Carioca champions

33rd title

== Torneio Independência ==
The Torneio Independência was contested by all the teams participating in the Campeonato Carioca except the "Big Four" of Rio de Janeiro (Botafogo, Flamengo, Fluminense and Vasco da Gama). Their standings were based in the results of the Taça Guanabara excluding all the matches played against the Big Four.

| Pos | Team | Pld | W | D | L | GF | GA | GD | Pts |
|---|---|---|---|---|---|---|---|---|---|
| 1 | Volta Redonda (C) | 7 | 4 | 2 | 1 | 22 | 9 | +13 | 14 |
| 2 | Nova Iguaçu | 7 | 3 | 3 | 1 | 8 | 3 | +5 | 12 |
| 3 | Audax Rio | 7 | 3 | 3 | 1 | 12 | 8 | +4 | 12 |
| 4 | Bangu | 7 | 3 | 2 | 2 | 5 | 7 | −2 | 11 |
| 5 | Portuguesa | 7 | 2 | 4 | 1 | 7 | 5 | +2 | 10 |
| 6 | Madureira | 7 | 2 | 1 | 4 | 5 | 15 | −10 | 7 |
| 7 | Boavista | 7 | 1 | 2 | 4 | 9 | 13 | −4 | 5 |
| 8 | Resende | 7 | 1 | 1 | 5 | 3 | 11 | −8 | 4 |

Source: FERJ
Rules for classification: 1) points; 2) wins; 3) goal difference; 4) goals scored; 5) head-to-head results (only between two teams); 6) disciplinary record; 7) drawing of lots.
(C) Champions

== Top goalscorers ==
| Rank | Player | Team | Goals |
|---|---|---|---|
| 1 | (Argentina) Germán Cano | Fluminense | 16 |
| 2 | (Brazil) Lelê | Volta Redonda | 13 |
| 3 | (Brazil) Pedro | Flamengo | 9 |
| 4 | (Brazil) Gabriel Pec | Vasco da Gama | 6 |
| 4 | (Brazil) Pablo Thomaz | Audax Rio | 6 |
| 4 | (Brazil) Pedro Raul | Vasco da Gama | 6 |
| 7 | (Brazil) Gabriel Barbosa | Flamengo | 5 |
| 8 | (Brazil) Luís Felipe | Bangu | 4 |
| 8 | (Brazil) Pedrinho | Volta Redonda | 4 |
