= Luís Felipe (footballer, born 2000) =

Brazilian footballer

Personal information
- Full name: Luís Felipe da Silva Rodrigues
- Date of birth: 21 November 2000 (age 25)
- Place of birth: Saquarema, Brazil
- Height: 1.83 m (6 ft 0 in)
- Position: Forward

Team information
- Current team: Vora
- Number: 9

Youth career
- Boavista

Senior career*
| Years | Team | Apps | (Gls) |
| 2020–2021 | Boavista | 17 | (2) |
| 2020 | → Paraná (loan) | 0 | (0) |
| 2022 | Paraná | 3 | (0) |
| 2022 | Caldense | 11 | (0) |
| 2023–2025 | Bangu | 11 | (4) |
| 2023 | → CSA (loan) | 10 | (1) |
| 2024 | → Ipatinga (loan) | 10 | (5) |
| 2025 | Aymorés | 8 | (1) |
| 2025– | Vora | 27 | (5) |
- * Club domestic league appearances and goals as of 13 May 2026

Luís Felipe da Silva Rodrigues (born 21 November 2000), known as Luís Felipe, is a Brazilian professional footballer who plays as a forward for Albanian club Vora.

== Career ==
Luís Felipe was born in Saquarema, Rio de Janeiro, and was a Boavista youth graduate. After featuring in just one first team match, he moved on loan to Paraná in September 2020, but only featured for the under-20 team.

Upon returning, Luís Felipe started to feature more regularly for Boavista, before returning to Paraná on 22 December 2021, now on a permanent deal. After being rarely used, he joined Caldense on 5 May 2022.

After starting the 2023 season at Bangu, Luís Felipe was the top scorer of the club in the 2023 Campeonato Carioca before being loaned to Série C side CSA on 12 March of that year. On 10 January 2024, he was announced at Ipatinga also in a temporary deal.

== Career statistics ==
As of 25 April 2024

Appearances and goals by club, season and competition
| Club | Season | League | | | State league | | Cup | | Continental | | Other | | Total | |
| Club | Season | Division | Apps | Goals | Apps | Goals | Apps | Goals | Apps | Goals | Apps | Goals | Apps | Goals |
|---|---|---|---|---|---|---|---|---|---|---|---|---|---|---|
| Boavista | 2020 | Carioca | — | | 1 | 0 | 0 | 0 | — | | — | | 1 | 0 |
| Boavista | 2021 | Série D | 11 | 2 | 5 | 0 | 2 | 0 | — | | 1 (Note: Appearance(s) in Copa Rio) | 0 | 19 | 2 |
| Boavista | Total | | 11 | 2 | 6 | 0 | 2 | 0 | — | | 1 | 0 | 20 | 2 |
| Paraná (loan) | 2020 | Série B | 0 | 0 | — | | — | | — | | — | | 0 | 0 |
| Paraná | 2022 | Série D | 0 | 0 | 3 | 0 | 0 | 0 | — | | — | | 3 | 0 |
| Caldense | 2022 | Série D | 11 | 0 | — | | — | | — | | — | | 11 | 0 |
| Bangu | 2023 | Carioca | — | | 11 | 4 | — | | — | | — | | 11 | 4 |
| CSA (loan) | 2023 | Série C | 10 | 1 | — | | 1 | 0 | — | | 2 (Note: Appearance(s) in Copa Alagoas) | 0 | 13 | 1 |
| Ipatinga (loan) | 2024 | Mineiro | — | | 10 | 5 | — | | — | | — | | 10 | 5 |
| Career total | | | 32 | 3 | 30 | 9 | 3 | 0 | 0 | 0 | 3 | 0 | 68 | 12 |
