= Wesley (footballer, born April 2000) =

Brazilian footballer

Personal information
- Full name: Wesley Hudson da Silva
- Date of birth: 15 April 2000 (age 26)
- Place of birth: Juiz de Fora, Brazil
- Height: 1.81 m (5 ft 11 in)
- Position: Midfielder

Team information
- Current team: Juventude

Youth career
- –2019: Tupi
- 2019–2021: Atlético Mineiro

Senior career*
Years	Team	Apps	(Gls)
2020–2022	Atlético Mineiro	2	(0)
2021	→ Brasil de Pelotas (loan)	23	(0)
2022	→ Villa Nova (loan)	12	(1)
2022	→ Paysandu (loan)	18	(2)
2023–	Juventude	0	(0)
- * Club domestic league appearances and goals as of 31 December 2022

Wesley Hudson da Silva (born 15 April 2000), known simply as Wesley, is a Brazilian professional footballer who plays as a midfielder for Juventude.

== Club career ==
Born in Juiz de Fora, Minas Gerais, Wesley joined Atlético Mineiro's youth setup in 2019 from his hometown club Tupi. He received an emergency call up to the first-team squad ahead of a Série A match against Athletico Paranaense on 18 November 2020, after several players of the team had tested positive for COVID-19. He came on as a last-minute substitute for his U20s teammate Talison, who had been picked for the match under the same circumstances, as Atlético suffered a 2–0 home defeat.

== Honours ==
Atlético Mineiro

- Campeonato Brasileiro Sub-20: 2020
