= Vitor Mendes =

Brazilian footballer

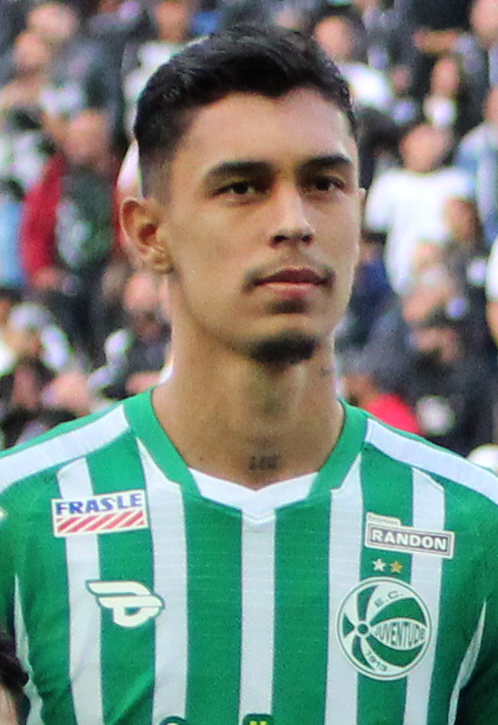

Personal information
- Full name: Vitor Mendes Alves
- Date of birth: 13 February 1999 (age 27)
- Place of birth: Belém, Brazil
- Height: 1.86 m (6 ft 1 in)
- Position: Centre back

Team information
- Current team: Cuiabá
- Number: 4

Youth career
- Carajás
- Paysandu
- Inter de Limeira
- 2016–2019: Santos
- 2018–2019: → Atlético Mineiro (loan)

Senior career*
Years	Team	Apps	(Gls)
2019–2023	Atlético Mineiro	3	(0)
2020	→ Guarani (loan)	0	(0)
2020	→ Boa Esporte (loan)	4	(0)
2020–2021	→ Figueirense (loan)	19	(0)
2021	→ Juventude (loan)	44	(2)
2022	→ Juventude (loan)	19	(1)
2023	→ Fluminense (loan)	6	(0)
2025	Ferroviária	3	(0)
2026–	Cuiabá	32	(2)
- * Club domestic league appearances and goals as of 18 November 2026

Vitor Mendes Alves (born 13 February 1999), known as Vitor Mendes, is a Brazilian footballer who plays as a central defender for Cuiabá.

== Club career ==
Born in Belém, Pará, Mendes joined Santos' youth setup in 2016, from Inter de Limeira. On 18 August 2017, he signed his first professional contract until 2022, but was loaned to Atlético Mineiro in 2018, after appearing rarely.

In December 2019, Galo activated the R$ 400,000 buyout clause on his contract, and Mendes signed a permanent contract with the club. The following 4 February, however, he joined Guarani on loan, but returned to his parent club in May after making no appearances.

On 20 July 2020, Mendes was loaned to Série C side Boa Esporte until May 2021. He made his senior debut six days later, coming on as a second-half substitute for Wesley in a 1–0 Campeonato Mineiro away win against Patrocinense.

On 21 October 2020, Mendes joined Figueirense on loan for the remainder of the 2020 Série B season. The following 8 February, he moved to Juventude, recently promoted to the Série A, also in a temporary deal.

== Career statistics ==
As of 31 December 2022

Club	Season	League			State League		Cup		Continental		Other		Total	
Club	Season	Division	Apps	Goals	Apps	Goals	Apps	Goals	Apps	Goals	Apps	Goals	Apps	Goals
Atlético Mineiro	2019	Série A	0	0	—		—		0	0	—		0	0
Atlético Mineiro	2022	Série A	0	0	3	0	0	0	0	0	0	0	3	0
Atlético Mineiro	Total		0	0	3	0	0	0	0	0	0	0	3	0
Guarani (loan)	2020	Série B	0	0	0	0	—		—		—		0	0
Boa Esporte (loan)	2020	Série C	3	0	1	0	—		—		—		4	0
Figueirense (loan)	2020	Série B	19	0	—		—		—		—		19	0
Juventude (loan)	2021	Série A	34	2	10	0	1	1	—		—		45	3
Juventude (loan)	2022	Série A	19	1	—		2	0	—		—		21	1
Career total			75	3	14	0	3	1	0	0	0	0	92	4

== Honours ==
Atlético Mineiro

- Supercopa do Brasil: 2022
- Campeonato Mineiro: 2022

Fluminense

- Campeonato Carioca: 2023
- Copa Libertadores da América: 2023
