= Vitor Eudes =

Brazilian footballer (born 1998)

Personal information
- Full name: Vitor Eudes de Souza Costa
- Date of birth: 21 October 1998 (age 28)
- Place of birth: Contagem, Minas Gerais, Brazil
- Height: 1.94 m (6 ft 4 in)
- Position: Goalkeeper

Team information
- Current team: Fluminense
- Number: 98

Youth career
- –2015: Frigoarnaldo
- 2016–2020: Cruzeiro

Senior career*
Years	Team	Apps	(Gls)
2018–2021	Cruzeiro	2	(0)
2021–2022	Marítimo II	7	(0)
2023–	Fluminense	11	(0)
- * Club domestic league appearances and goals as of 6 April 2026

Vitor Eudes de Souza Costa (born 21 October 1998), commonly known as Vitor Eudes, is a Brazilian professional footballer who plays as a goalkeeper for Fluminense.

== Club career ==
Born in Contagem, in the Brazilian state of Minas Gerais, Vitor Eudes started his career with local amateur side Frigoarnaldo, before being scouted by Cruzeiro's under-20 goalkeeping coach, Leonardo Lopes, and going on to sign with the club in 2016. In 2018, having been named on the bench for Cruzeiro a number of times, he was subject to interest from Portuguese side Benfica, but would opt to remain with Cruzeiro, signing a new contract with the club.

Having only made two appearances for Cruzeiro in four seasons, often being an unused substitute, Vitor Eudes cancelled his contract with the club and moved to Portugal in 2021, signing with Marítimo. During his time in Portugal, he mostly featured for Marítimo's under-23 side.

He returned to Brazil in January 2023, joining Série A side Fluminense on a free transfer.

== Style of play ==
Vitor Eudes is renowned for his penalty-saving ability, notably saving three penalties in the final of the 2017 edition of the Campeonato Brasileiro Sub-20 - a 7–6 penalty shoot-out win against Coritiba. He has listed Fábio, another goalkeeper known for his ability to save penalties, as an inspiration to him.

== Career statistics ==
=== Club ===
As of match played 17 January 2026

Appearances and goals by club, season and competition
Club	Season	League			State league		Cup		Continental		Other		Total	
Club	Season	Division	Apps	Goals	Apps	Goals	Apps	Goals	Apps	Goals	Apps	Goals	Apps	Goals
Cruzeiro	2018	Série A	0	0	0	0	0	0	0	0	—		0	0
Cruzeiro	2019	Série B	0	0	0	0	0	0	0	0	—		0	0
Cruzeiro	2020	Série B	1	0	1 (Note: Appearances in the Campeonato Mineiro)	0	0	0	—		—		2	0
Cruzeiro	2021	Série B	0	0	0	0	0	0	—		—		0	0
Cruzeiro	Total		1	0	1	0	0	0	0	0	—		2	0
Marítimo II	2021–22	Campeonato de Portugal	6	0	—		—		—		—		6	0
Marítimo II	2022–23	Campeonato de Portugal	1	0	—		—		—		—		1	0
Marítimo II	Total		7	0	—		—		—		—		7	0
Fluminense	2023	Série A	1	0	0	0	0	0	0	0	0	0	1	0
Fluminense	2024	Série A	1	0	4 (Note: Appearances in Campeonato Carioca)	0	0	0	0	0	0	0	5	0
Fluminense	2025	Série A	0	0	3	0	0	0	2	0	0	0	5	0
Fluminense	2026	Série A	0	0	2	0	0	0	0	0	—		2	0
Fluminense	Total		2	0	9	0	0	0	2	0	0	0	13	0
Career total			10	0	10	0	0	0	2	0	0	0	22	0

== Honours ==
Fluminense

- Taça Guanabara: 2023
- Campeonato Carioca: 2023
- Copa Libertadores: 2023
