= Pedro Rangel (footballer) =

Brazilian footballer (born 2000)

Personal information
- Full name: Pedro Felipe de Faria Rangel
- Date of birth: 29 June 2000 (age 26)
- Place of birth: Nepomuceno, Brazil
- Height: 1.92 m (6 ft 4 in)
- Position: Goalkeeper

Team information
- Current team: Coritiba (on loan from Fluminense)
- Number: 12

Youth career
- Santana-MG
- Itapirense
- 2019–2020: → Fluminense (loan)

Senior career*
Years	Team	Apps	(Gls)
2021-2025	Fluminense	7	(0)
2024	→ Atlético Goianiense (loan)	9	(0)
2025	→ Coritiba (loan)	10	(0)
2025–	Coritiba	22	(1)
- * Club domestic league appearances and goals as of 5 June 2026

Pedro Felipe de Faria Rangel (born 29 June 2000), known as Pedro Rangel, is a Brazilian footballer who plays as a goalkeeper for Coritiba.

== Club career ==
Born in Nepomuceno, Pedro Rangel began his career at the age of sixteen with local side Santana EC, before joining Itapirense. In February 2019, he joined top flight side Fluminense on loan. Having impressed on loan, Pedro Rangel joined Fluminense permanently ahead of the 2021 season, as a replacement for Marcelo Pitaluga, who had moved to English side Liverpool.

He made his professional debut for Fluminense in a surprise 2–1 loss to Resende in the Campeonato Carioca on 5 March 2021. The following year, despite not featuring for Fluminense in any competition, he signed a new contract until 2026. He returned to first-team action in the 2023 season, making his first appearances in front of fans for Fluminense, as the games he had previously played in had featured no spectators due to the COVID-19 pandemic in Brazil.

On 11 January 2024, Rangel was loaned to Atlético Goianiense for the season.

In January 2025 after not reaching an agreement with Atlético Goianiense, he returned to Fluminense.

In February 2025, Rangel was loaned to Coritiba for the season.

In July 2025, Coritiba exercised its option to purchase the loan player and signed a permanent contract with the goalkeeper.

On January 31, 2026, Pedro Rangel scored a goal from a goal kick of approximately 99.7 meters against Cianorte.

== Career statistics ==
=== Club ===
As of 15 February 2024.

Appearances and goals by club, season and competition
Club	Season	League			State League		Cup		Continental		Other		Total	
Club	Season	Division	Apps	Goals	Apps	Goals	Apps	Goals	Apps	Goals	Apps	Goals	Apps	Goals
Fluminense	2021	Série A	0	0	2 (Note: Appearances in the Campeonato Carioca)	0	0	0	0	0	—		2	0
Fluminense	2022	Série A	0	0	0	0	0	0	0	0	—		0	0
Fluminense	2023	Série A	2	0	3	0	0	0	0	0	0	0	5	0
Fluminense	Total		2	0	5	0	0	0	0	0	0	0	7	0
Atlético Goianiense (loan)	2024	Série A	0	0	0	0	0	0	—		—		0	0
Career total			2	0	5	0	0	0	0	0	0	0	7	0

== Honours ==
Coritiba

- Campeonato Brasileiro Série B: 2025

Fluminense

- Copa Libertadores: 2023
