= Nepomuceno =

Municipality of Brazil

Coordinates: 21°13′41″S 45°14′23″W

- Municipality
- Interactive map of Nepomuceno
- Country: Brazil
- State: Minas Gerais
- Region: Southeast
- Time zone: UTC−3 (BRT)

Location of Nepomuceno within Minas Gerais

Nepomuceno is a Brazilian municipality located in the state of the state of Minas Gerais. The population in 2020 was 26,826 in a total area of 584 km^{2} (225 sq mi). The maximum elevation is 1,100 m (3,600 ft) and the minimum is 850 m (2,790 ft).

The city belongs to the IBGE statistical microregion of Varginha. It lies 12 km (7.5 mi) west of the important highway BR-381 (Fernão Dias). Distances to major and nearby cities are:

- Belo Horizonte – 233 km
- São Paulo – 330 km
- Rio de Janeiro – 396 km
- Brasília – 1085 km
- Três Pontas – 54 km
- Três Corações – 80 km
- Varginha – 81 km
- Lavras – 25 km

The climate is humid, with mild summers, subject to sporadic periods of drought and with mild winters. The annual rainfall is 1,600 mm.

== Temperature ==
Annual average: 21.2 C Annual average maximum: 27.8 C Annual average minimum: 13.5 C

The main source of income is the cultivation of coffee, which represents 70% of the economy. There is also production of corn, rice, and beans. Another important activity is poultry raising, producing around one million eggs a day. In 2006 there were 1,080 rural producers with an area of 34,213 hectares of agricultural land. Cultivated land made up 16,000 hectares. There were 4,800 workers in agriculture.

In the health sector there were 12 health clinics and 1 private hospital, with 47 beds (2005). In the school system there were 31 primary schools, of which 3 were private, and 2 middle schools, of which 1 was private. In 2005 there were 114 attending an extension of a private university.

== Municipal Human Development Index ==
As of 2000, the municipal Human Development Index for Nepomuceno was .747.

- State ranking: 309 out of 853 municipalities
- National ranking: 1,965 out of 5,138 municipalities
- Life expectancy: 71
- Literacy rate: 85

== See also ==
- List of municipalities in Minas Gerais
