= Micael (name) =

Micael is a name.

== Given name ==
- Micael Babo (born 1993), Portuguese footballer
- Micael Bennett (born 1965), Broadcast announcer
- Micael Bindefeld (born 1959), Swedish event organizer
- Micael Bydén (born 1964), Supreme Commander of the Swedish Armed Forces
- Micael Dahlén (born 1973), Swedish economist
- Micael Freire (born 1994), Portuguese footballer
- Micael Galvâo (born 2003), Brazilian jiu-jitsu practitioner
- Micael Isidoro (born 1982), Portuguese road cyclist
- Micael Kiriakos Delaoglou a.k.a. Mikkey Dee (born 1963), Swedish musician
- Micael Lundmark (born 1986), Swedish snowboarder
- Micael Priest (1951-2018), American artist and raconteur
- Micael dos Santos Silva (born 2000), Brazilian footballer
- Micael Sequeira (born 1973), Portuguese football manager
- Micael Silva (born 1993), Portuguese footballer
- Micael (footballer, born 2006), Micael de Barros Viturino, Brazilian forward for São José-SP

== Surname ==
- André Micael (born 1989), Portuguese footballer
- Felipe Micael (born 2001), Brazilian footballer
- Letekidan Micael (born 1997), Eritrean actress
- Rúben Micael (born 1986), Portuguese footballer

== See also ==
- Michael
