= Paraíba do Sul, Rio de Janeiro =

Municipality of Paraíba do Sul
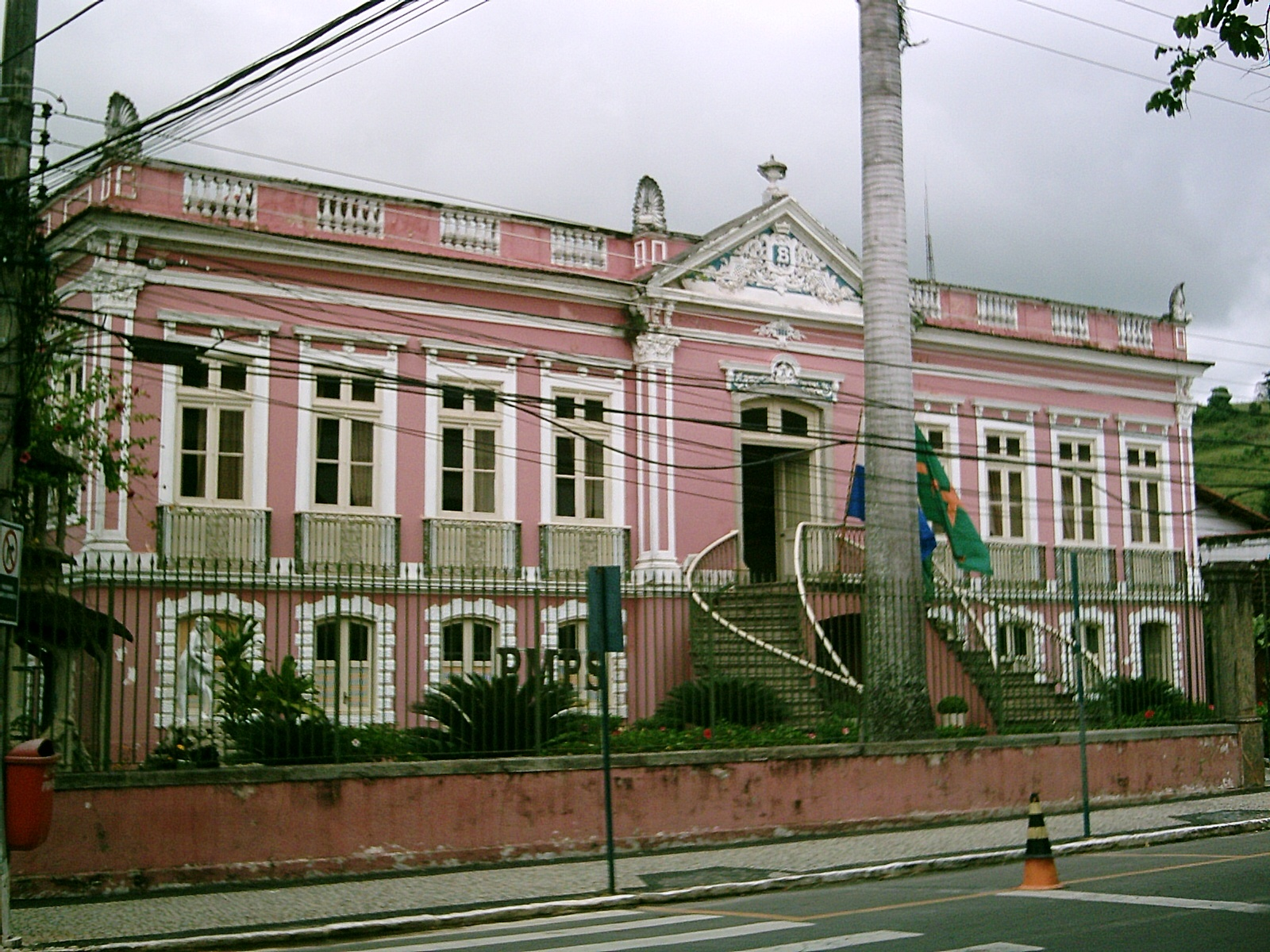
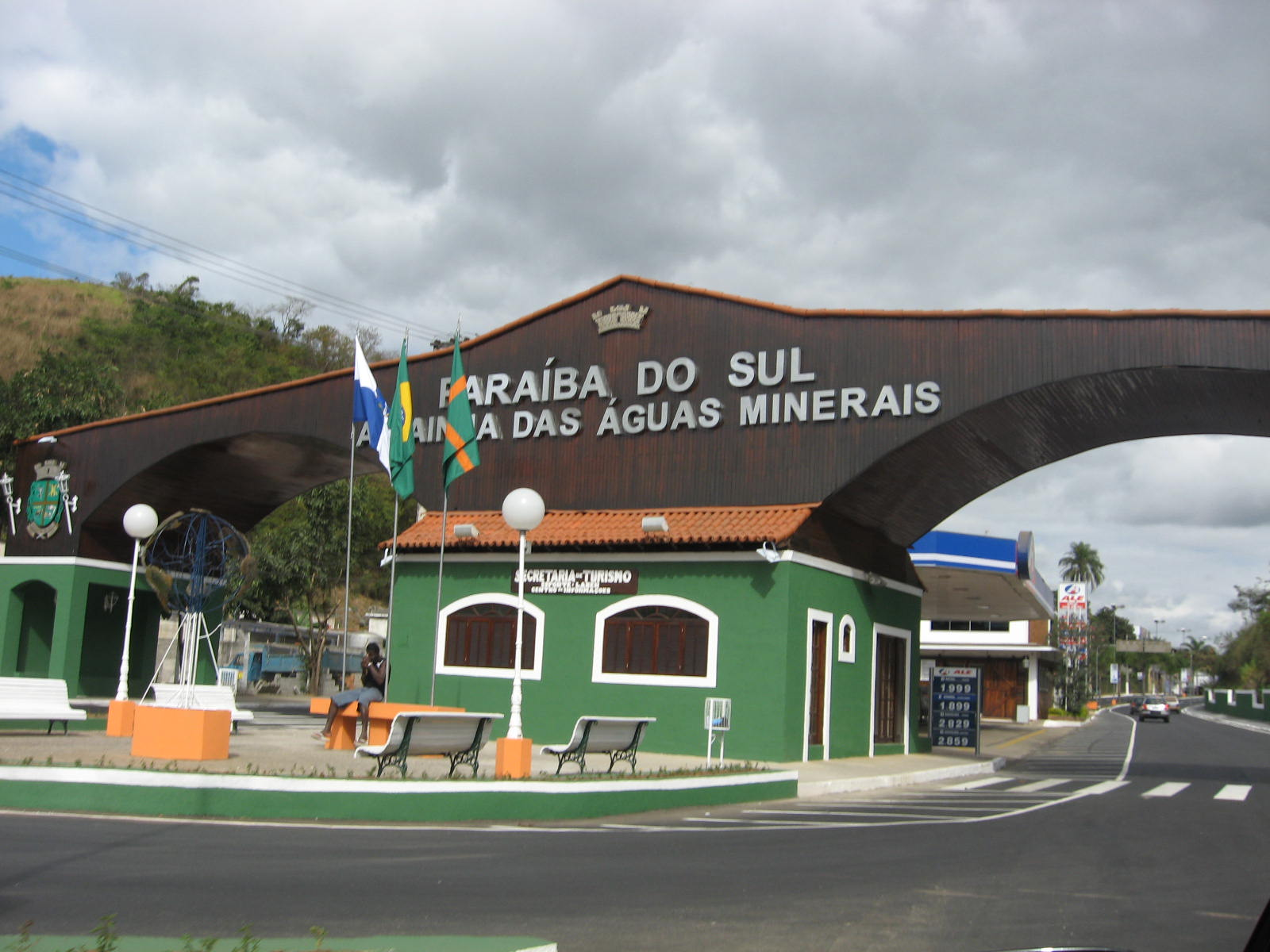
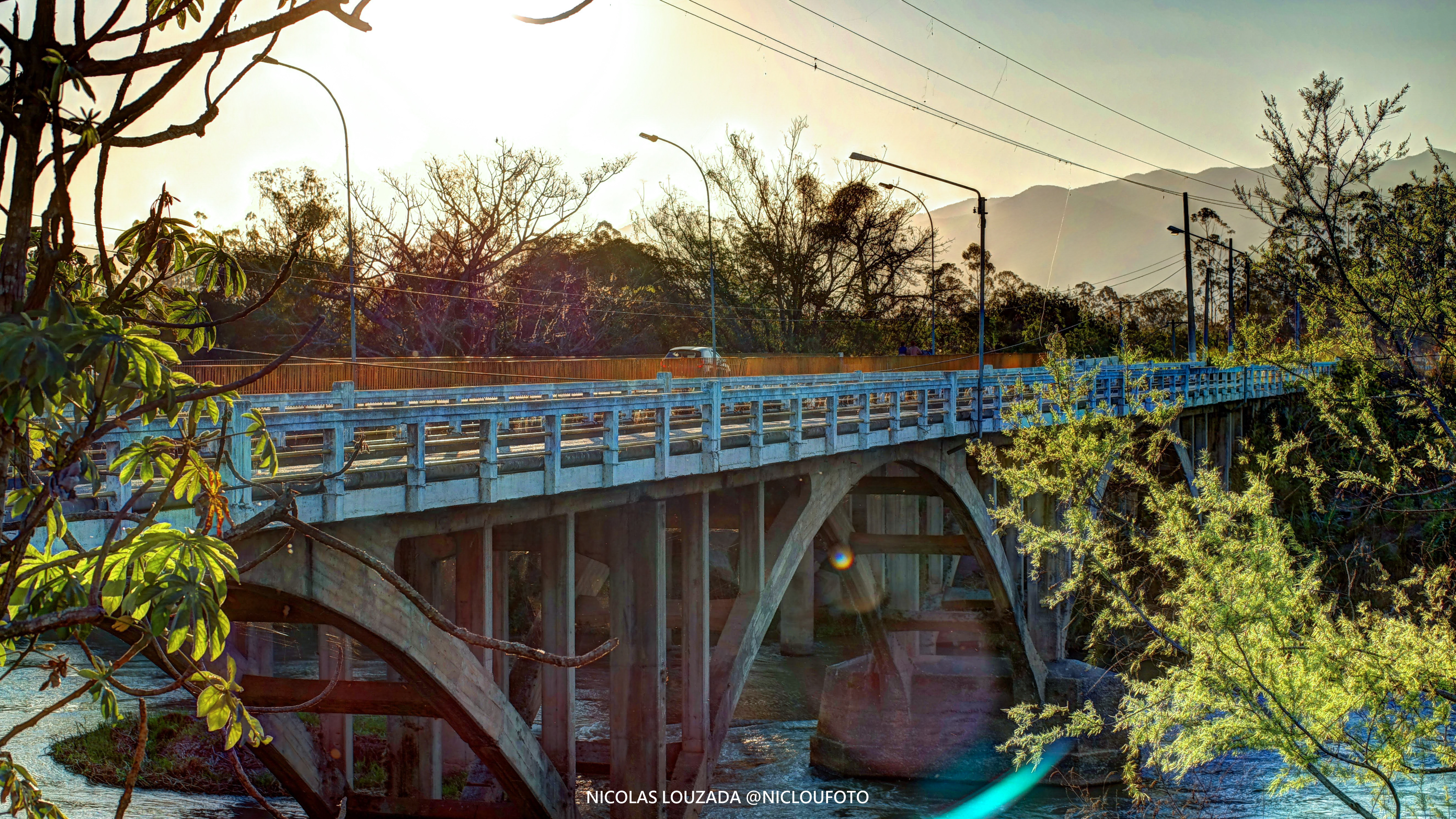
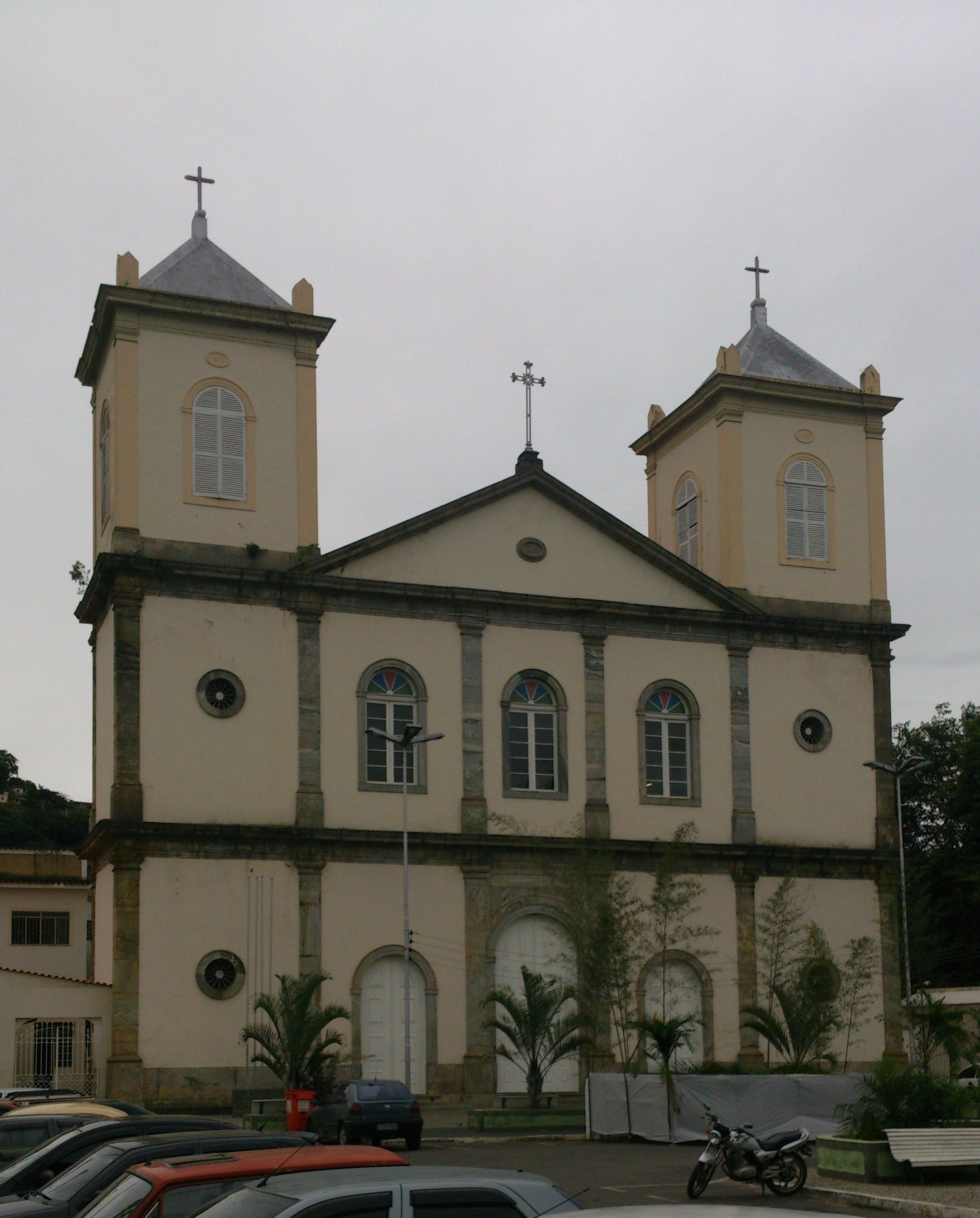
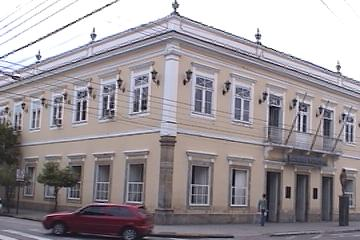
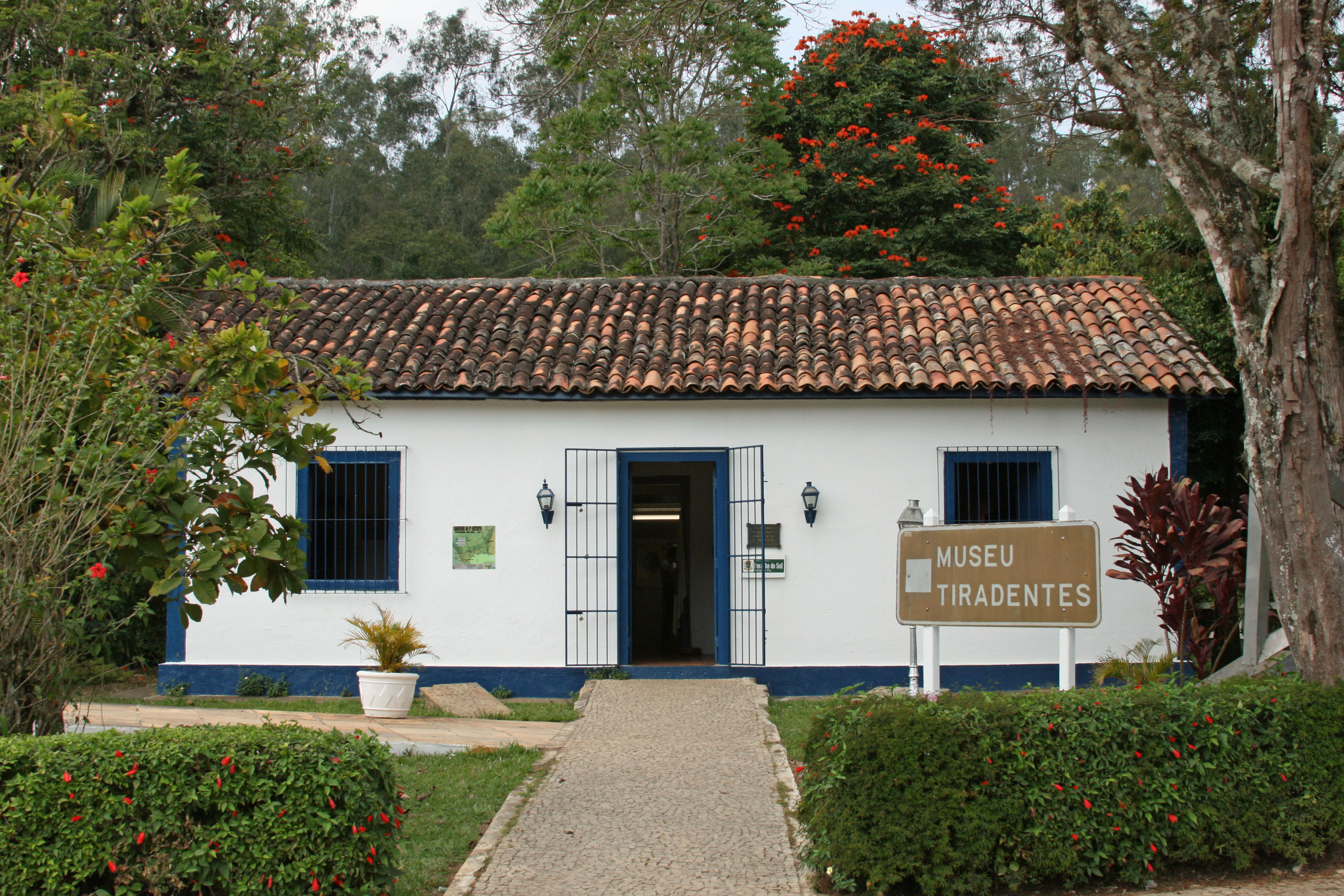
- Barão Ribeiro de Sá Palace (City hall) City entrance gate Old bridge over the Paraíba do Sul river, which gives the city its name São Pedro e São Paulo Church City Council Tiradentes Museum

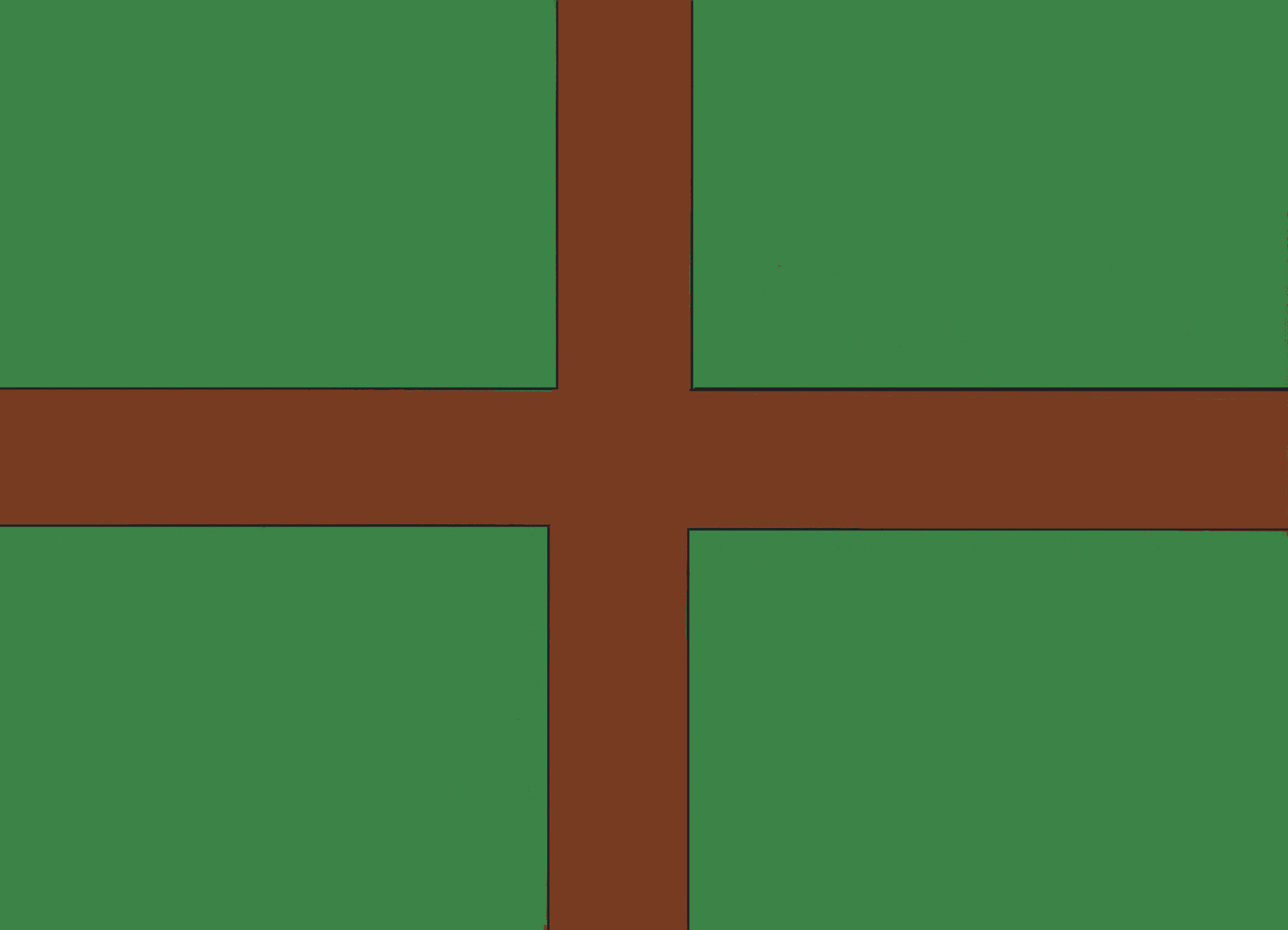
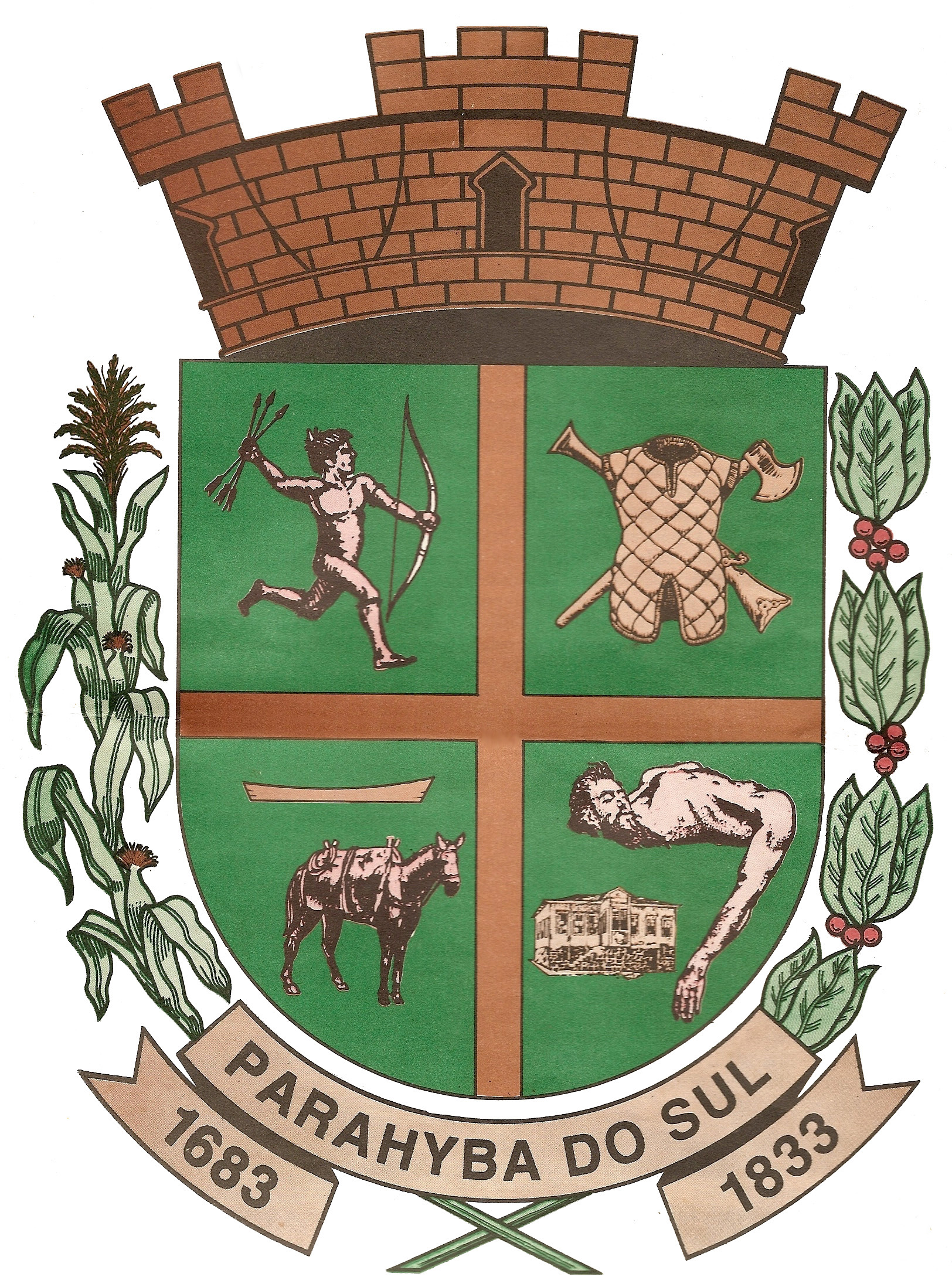
- Flag Coat of arms
- Nickname: The Queen of Minerals Waters
- Motto: City of Peace
- Coordinates: 22°09′43″S 43°17′34″W
- Country: Brazil
- Region: Southeast
- State: State of Rio de Janeiro
- Founded: 1833

Government
  - Mayor: Márcio Abreu de Oliveira (DEM)

Area
  - Total: 580.803 km^{2} (224.249 sq mi)
- Elevation: 390 m (1,280 ft)

Population (2020)
  - Total: 44,518
  - Density: 76.649/km^{2} (198.52/sq mi)
- Time zone: UTC−3 (BRT)
- Website: http://www.paraibanet.com.br/

Paraíba do Sul (Brazilian Portuguese pronunciation: [paɾaˈibɐ du ˈsuw]) is a municipality located in the Brazilian state of Rio de Janeiro. Its population was 44,518 (2020) and its area is 581 km^{2} (224 sq mi).

== History ==
Paraíba do Sul is the pioneer municipality of Serra Fluminense, disseminator of civilization in what was called the 18th century backlands of Paraiba.

The city was born near a backwater discovered in Paraíba do Sul River in 1681 by Garcia Rodrigues Paes son of Fernão Dias Paes Leme. The 20 years boy knew that in the rare backwater flowing river was directly north the city of Rio de Janeiro, sea port turn meant that the gem mines discovered by his father, late that same year. In Lisbon in 1682, had the disappointment of them only know tourmalines, but promised Pedro II the most direct route there may be between the mines and the March The king promised him lands and privileges, provided that discovered gold and precious stones.

In 1683, Garcia opened backwater on the farm origin of the city, fifteen years later, discovered gold, the construction workforce of the Way that historians call the New. The Farm Parahyba fueled with corn fields, river fish and game from the virgin forest to front-of-work Indians puris enslaved by aggregates Garcia, curibocas guainás Plateau of São Paulo. In 1698 to 1700 opened the stretch of the Paraíba to Rio de Janeiro, and even 1704 which hit the Mantiqueira Mountains. Then, in the current region Barbacena, the New Way joined the Elder, who came from São Paulo.

In 1709 to 1711 Garcia was in Lisbon fighting for John V fulfilled the promises of the parent by the opening of the New Way. Was this interregnum that Maria Pinheiro da Fonseca, his wife, kept on the farm colonial treasure brought hastily from Rio de Janeiro invaded by the French. Garcia received land grants of nearly 40 miles along the road and over 13 wide, and a charter of the village to his farm that did not interest to use for attracting outsiders (the fight between São Paulo and Rio das Mortes in reinóis - War Emboabas - showed the competition that face). The Paes Leme family, his descendants retained the farm and leased to the revolutionary creation of the village head-to-county in 1833.

Guard-Mor General of Mines lifetime since 1702, when he died in the Paraíba March 7 of 1738 Garcia Rodrigues Paes was the greatest fortune of Colonial Brazil. However, he was destitute at age 20 when he discovered the backwater in Paraíba, since the father's entire fortune spent seven years wandering in the backcountry with the famous Flag of Esmeraldas, which gave in tourmalines.

Further interesting aspect of Paraíba do Sul, store is the only known tomb of the remains of Tiradentes. In the village of Sebolas were exposed and interred in the cemetery of the farm's arm and left chest Hero. Today the site is a meadow where cattle graze. The Historical and Geographical Institute of the municipality suggests building up there, with the support of cultural foundations of the country, which calls Sebolas Historic Park.

There are many other stories involving the city, born here and killed people linked to major historical figures in the arts, politics and literature, the first wife of Villa Lobos for example (which in many instances the composition of her husband was at her side fixing scores, since it was a great connoisseur of the art), and many other lesser known figures, who in one way or another participated in the construction of our civilization as we know it.

In Paraíba do Sul, where today there are many passes to Mary Smoke, tourist attraction of the city bridges, two for car traffic and one for train traffic.

The city contains a variety of natural features within its rugged rural landscape, including green areas, hotels, waterfall, spas and a shrine that is visited annually by pilgrims.

Paraíba do Sul played an important role in regional development, with its century-old bridge that crosses the river Paraíba been built by enthusiast Baron of Maua.

== Geography ==
Located at 306 m altitude, Paraíba do Sul is located at latitude 22°09'43" south and longitude 43°17'34" west. It has an area of 582.21 square kilometres (224.79 sq mi).

The highest point in the municipality is the Stone of Stakeout, located in the district of Vila Salutaris, at about 700 m high. Because of the unique height, the stone was used by the pioneers to inspect the area around the city - hence the name Stone of Stakeout.

=== Relief ===
The peculiarities of the relief are the High Sierras of Dryland (858 m), Retiro (800 m) of Cavaru (700 m), Catete (535 m). The main soil types in the county latosssolo are red, red-yellow podzolic, red-yellow mediterranean, orange rootstock and associations podzolic and podzolic red Oxisols.

=== Hydrography ===
The peculiarities of hydrography are Black and Paraíba do Sul rivers.

=== Environment ===
According to data from FEEMA (1990/91) in the Paraíba do Sul are found the following environmental issues:

Semi-critical - soil erosion, vectors, risk of accidents and mining;

In alertness - deficiency sewage systems, degradation of conservation areas, tree cover disability, poor living conditions, deforestation, pesticides and occupation of hillsides process.

== Subdivisions ==
The city of Paraíba do Sul is divided into four districts and 42 neighborhoods.

District	Name	Inhabitants
#1 District	Paraíba do Sul	19.629
#2 District	Salutaris	15.780
#3 District	Inconfidência	1.900
#4 District	Werneck	3.775

== Others ==
Contains a bronze statue of former Palestinian President Yasser Arafat

Also contains a statue dedicated to Che Guevara.
