= 2025 FIFA Club World Cup Group F =

Soccer tournament group stage

Group F was one of eight groups in the 2025 FIFA Club World Cup, an international club soccer tournament hosted in the United States and organized by FIFA. It comprised four teams: Fluminense of Brazil; Borussia Dortmund of Germany; Ulsan HD of South Korea; and Mamelodi Sundowns of South Africa. Teams qualified by winning the respective continental club championships of their confederation or through a ranking of their performance in competitions. Only two clubs per country were allowed to qualify unless three or four won their respective continental club championship. The 2025 edition of the FIFA Club World Cup was the first in the tournament's history to be played under its quadrennial format with 32 teams. The group's matches began on June 17 and concluded on June 25.

== Teams ==
The four teams in Group F were decided by the FIFA Club World Cup draw held by FIFA on December 5, 2024, in the Miami area. The 32 participants were divided into four pots based on their confederation and ranking within FIFA's club ranking system. Each of the eight groups would receive one team from each pot. Teams from the same confederation could not be drawn into the same group except for those from UEFA, which had twelve slots; teams from the same national association were not able to be drawn into the same group.

2025 FIFA Club World Cup Group F draw
Draw position	Team	Association	Pot	Confederation	Method of qualification	Date of qualification	Appearance	Last appearance	Previous best performance
F1	Fluminense	Brazil	1	CONMEBOL	Winners of the 2023 Copa Libertadores	November 4, 2023	2nd	2023	Runners-up (2023)
F2	Borussia Dortmund	Germany	2	UEFA	UEFA four-year ranking (3rd among eligible)	March 6, 2024	1st	—N/a	—N/a
F3	Ulsan HD	South Korea	3	AFC	AFC four-year ranking (1st among eligible)	April 17, 2024	3rd	2020	Sixth place (2012, 2020)
F4	Mamelodi Sundowns	South Africa	4	CAF	CAF four-year ranking (2nd among eligible)	October 19, 2024	2nd	2016	Sixth place (2016)

== Standings ==
Pos	Team	Pld	W	D	L	GF	GA	GD	Pts	Qualification
1	(Germany) Borussia Dortmund	3	2	1	0	5	3	+2	7	Advance to knockout stage
2	(Brazil) Fluminense	3	1	2	0	4	2	+2	5	Advance to knockout stage
3	(South Africa) Mamelodi Sundowns	3	1	1	1	4	4	0	4	
4	(South Korea) Ulsan HD	3	0	0	3	2	6	−4	0	

Source: FIFA
Rules for classification: Group stage tiebreakers

In the round of 16:

- The winners of Group F, Borussia Dortmund, advanced to play the runners-up of Group E, Monterrey.
- The runners-up of Group F, Fluminense, advanced to play the winners of Group E, Inter Milan.

== Matches ==
Matches took place from June 17 to 25. All times listed are local.

=== Fluminense vs Borussia Dortmund ===
June 17, 2025
12:00 pm EDT

Fluminense (Brazil)	0–0	(Germany) Borussia Dortmund
	Report

MetLife Stadium, East Rutherford
Attendance: 34,736
Referee: Ilgiz Tantashev (Uzbekistan)

Fluminense	Borussia Dortmund

GK	1	(Brazil) Fábio
RB	2	(Brazil) Samuel Xavier
CB	3	(Brazil) Thiago Silva (c)
CB	22	(Argentina) Juan Pablo Freytes
LB	6	(Brazil) Renê
DM	35	(Brazil) Hércules
CM	16	(Brazil) Nonato	(yellow card) 81'	(substituted off) 87'
CM	8	(Brazil) Matheus Martinelli	(yellow card) 9'	(substituted off) 76'
RF	21	(Colombia) Jhon Arias
CF	9	(Brazil) Everaldo		(substituted off) 70'
LF	17	(Uruguay) Agustín Canobbio		(substituted off) 70'
Substitutions:
FW	14	(Argentina) Germán Cano		(substituted on) 70'
FW	90	(Colombia) Kevin Serna		(substituted on) 70'
MF	45	(Brazil) Lima		(substituted on) 76'
FW	77	(Brazil) Paulo Baya		(substituted on) 87'
Manager:
(Brazil) Renato Gaúcho

GK	1	(Switzerland) Gregor Kobel
CB	25	(Germany) Niklas Süle
CB	3	(Germany) Waldemar Anton
CB	5	(Algeria) Ramy Bensebaini	(yellow card) 2'
RM	26	(Norway) Julian Ryerson		(substituted off) 87'
CM	20	(Austria) Marcel Sabitzer		(substituted off) 77'
CM	13	(Germany) Pascal Groß		(substituted off) 59'
LM	24	(Sweden) Daniel Svensson
RF	10	(Germany) Julian Brandt (c)		(substituted off) 77'
CF	9	(Guinea) Serhou Guirassy
LF	27	(Germany) Karim Adeyemi		(substituted off) 59'
Substitutions:
MF	77	(England) Jobe Bellingham		(substituted on) 59'
MF	8	(Germany) Felix Nmecha		(substituted on) 59'
FW	43	(England) Jamie Gittens		(substituted on) 77'
MF	17	(England) Carney Chukwuemeka		(substituted on) 77'
DF	2	(Brazil) Yan Couto	(yellow card) 90+4'	(substituted on) 87'
Manager:
(Croatia) Niko Kovač

Man of the Match:
Jhon Arias (Fluminense)

Assistant referees:
Andrey Tsapenko (Uzbekistan)
Timur Gaynullin (Uzbekistan)
Fourth official:
Omar Al Ali (United Arab Emirates)
Video assistant referee:
Shaun Evans (Australia)
Assistant video assistant referee:
Mohammed Obaid Khadim (United Arab Emirates)
Support video assistant referee:
Tatiana Guzmán (Nicaragua)

=== Ulsan HD vs Mamelodi Sundowns ===
June 17, 2025
7:05 pm EDT (Note: The Ulsan HD vs Mamelodi Sundowns match, originally scheduled for 6:00 pm EDT, was delayed to 7:05 pm EDT due to adverse weather conditions.)

Ulsan HD (South Korea)	0–1	(South Africa) Mamelodi Sundowns
	Report	Rayners 36'

Inter&Co Stadium, Orlando
Attendance: 3,412
Referee: Clément Turpin (France)

Ulsan HD	Mamelodi Sundowns

GK	21	(South Korea) Jo Hyeon-woo
RB	66	(Poland) Miłosz Trojak
CB	4	(South Korea) Seo Myung-gwan		(substituted off) 80'
CB	19	(South Korea) Kim Young-gwon (c)
LB	17	(Sweden) Gustav Ludwigson
RM	27	(South Korea) Lee Chung-yong		(substituted off) 64'
CM	5	(South Korea) Jung Woo-young		(substituted off) 73'
CM	6	(Sweden) Darijan Bojanić	(yellow card) 55'	(substituted off) 73'
LM	7	(South Korea) Ko Seung-beom
CF	11	(South Korea) Um Won-sang
CF	97	(Brazil) Erick Farias
Substitutions:
MF	36	(Venezuela) Matías Lacava		(substituted on) 64'
MF	14	(South Korea) Lee Jin-hyun		(substituted on) 73'
MF	16	(South Korea) Lee Hui-gyun		(substituted on) 73'
DF	13	(South Korea) Kang Sang-woo		(substituted on) 80'
Manager:
(South Korea) Kim Pan-gon

GK	30	(South Africa) Ronwen Williams
RB	25	(South Africa) Khuliso Mudau
CB	20	(South Africa) Grant Kekana
CB	24	(South Africa) Keanu Cupido		(substituted off) 85'
LB	29	(Zimbabwe) Divine Lunga
CM	11	(Chile) Marcelo Allende
CM	4	(South Africa) Teboho Mokoena	(yellow card) 86'
RW	10	(Brazil) Lucas Ribeiro		(substituted off) 84'
AM	9	(Brazil) Arthur Sales		(substituted off) 65'
LW	18	(South Africa) Themba Zwane (c)		(substituted off) 76'
CF	13	(South Africa) Iqraam Rayners		(substituted off) 77'
Substitutions:
FW	17	(South Africa) Tashreeq Matthews		(substituted on) 65'
MF	15	(South Africa) Bathusi Aubaas		(substituted on) 76'
FW	35	(South Africa) Lebo Mothiba		(substituted on) 77'
MF	8	(South Africa) Jayden Adams		(substituted on) 84'
DF	34	(South Africa) Mothobi Mvala		(substituted on) 85'
Manager:
(Portugal) Miguel Cardoso

Man of the Match:
Iqraam Rayners (Mamelodi Sundowns)

Assistant referees:
Nicolas Danos (France)
Benjamin Pagès (France)
Fourth official:
Slavko Vinčić (Slovenia)
Video assistant referee:
Jérôme Brisard (France)
Assistant video assistant referee:
Marco Di Bello (Italia)
Support video assistant referee:
Khamis Al-Marri (Qatar)

=== Mamelodi Sundowns vs Borussia Dortmund ===
June 21, 2025
12:00 pm EDT

Mamelodi Sundowns (South Africa)	3–4	(Germany) Borussia Dortmund
Ribeiro 11'; Rayners 62'; Mothiba 90'	Report	Nmecha 16'; Guirassy 34'; Bellingham 45'; Mudau 59' (o.g.)

TQL Stadium, Cincinnati
Attendance: 14,006
Referee: Juan Gabriel Benítez (Paraguay)

Mamelodi Sundowns	Borussia Dortmund

GK	30	(South Africa) Ronwen Williams
RB	25	(South Africa) Khuliso Mudau
CB	24	(South Africa) Keanu Cupido
CB	20	(South Africa) Grant Kekana
LB	29	(Zimbabwe) Divine Lunga
CM	11	(Chile) Marcelo Allende	(yellow card) 90+5'
CM	4	(South Africa) Teboho Mokoena		(substituted off) 69'
RW	10	(Brazil) Lucas Ribeiro		(substituted off) 69'
AM	18	(South Africa) Themba Zwane (c)		(substituted off) 86'
LW	17	(South Africa) Tashreeq Matthews	(yellow card) 66'	(substituted off) 69'
CF	13	(South Africa) Iqraam Rayners		(substituted off) 77'
Substitutions:
FW	9	(Brazil) Arthur Sales		(substituted on) 69'
MF	8	(South Africa) Jayden Adams		(substituted on) 69'
DF	27	(South Africa) Thapelo Morena		(substituted on) 69'
FW	35	(South Africa) Lebo Mothiba		(substituted on) 77'
FW	16	(South Africa) Kutlwano Letlhaku		(substituted on) 86'
Manager:
(Portugal) Miguel Cardoso

GK	1	(Switzerland) Gregor Kobel
CB	25	(Germany) Niklas Süle		(substituted off) 83'
CB	3	(Germany) Waldemar Anton
CB	5	(Algeria) Ramy Bensebaini
RM	2	(Brazil) Yan Couto
CM	8	(Germany) Felix Nmecha		(substituted off) 62'
CM	13	(Germany) Pascal Groß
LM	24	(Sweden) Daniel Svensson
RF	10	(Germany) Julian Brandt (c)		(substituted off) 62'
CF	9	(Guinea) Serhou Guirassy		(substituted off) 90+2'
LF	77	(England) Jobe Bellingham		(substituted off) 83'
Substitutions:
MF	17	(England) Carney Chukwuemeka	(yellow card) 64'	(substituted on) 62'
MF	20	(Austria) Marcel Sabitzer		(substituted on) 62'
DF	26	(Norway) Julian Ryerson		(substituted on) 83'
FW	14	(Germany) Maximilian Beier	(yellow card) 85'	(substituted on) 83'
FW	27	(Germany) Karim Adeyemi		(substituted on) 90+2'
Manager:
(Croatia) Niko Kovač

Man of the Match:
Jobe Bellingham (Borussia Dortmund)

Assistant referees:
Eduardo Cardozo (Paraguay)
Milcíades Saldívar (Paraguay)
Fourth official:
Clément Turpin (France)
Video assistant referee:
Leodán González (Uruguay)
Assistant video assistant referee:
Nicolás Gallo (Colombia)
Support video assistant referee:
Armando Villarreal (United States)

=== Fluminense vs Ulsan HD ===
June 21, 2025
6:00 pm EDT

Fluminense (Brazil)	4–2	(South Korea) Ulsan HD
Arias 27'; Nonato 66'; Freytes 83'; Keno 90+2'	Report	Lee Jin-hyun 37'; Um Won-sang 45+3'

MetLife Stadium, East Rutherford
Attendance: 29,321
Referee: Michael Oliver (England)

Fluminense	Ulsan HD

GK	1	(Brazil) Fábio
RB	23	(Brazil) Guga		(substituted off) 85'
CB	3	(Brazil) Thiago Silva (c)
CB	22	(Argentina) Juan Pablo Freytes
LB	12	(Colombia) Gabriel Fuentes
CM	35	(Brazil) Hércules
CM	8	(Brazil) Matheus Martinelli		(substituted off) 59'
RW	21	(Colombia) Jhon Arias
AM	10	(Brazil) Ganso		(substituted off) 46'
LW	90	(Colombia) Kevin Serna		(substituted off) 59'
CF	14	(Argentina) Germán Cano		(substituted off) 85'
Substitutions:
FW	9	(Brazil) Everaldo		(substituted on) 46'
FW	11	(Brazil) Keno	(yellow card) 90+4'	(substituted on) 59'
MF	16	(Brazil) Nonato		(substituted on) 59'
DF	2	(Brazil) Samuel Xavier		(substituted on) 85'
MF	5	(Uruguay) Facundo Bernal		(substituted on) 85'
Manager:
(Brazil) Renato Gaúcho

GK	21	(South Korea) Jo Hyeon-woo
CB	66	(Poland) Miłosz Trojak
CB	19	(South Korea) Kim Young-gwon (c)
CB	28	(South Korea) Lee Jae-ik	(substituted off) 85'
RWB	13	(South Korea) Kang Sang-woo	(substituted off) 63'
LWB	17	(Sweden) Gustav Ludwigson
CM	14	(South Korea) Lee Jin-hyun
CM	6	(Sweden) Darijan Bojanić	(substituted off) 85'
CM	7	(South Korea) Ko Seung-beom	(substituted off) 85'
CF	11	(South Korea) Um Won-sang	(substituted off) 74'
CF	97	(Brazil) Erick Farias
Substitutions:
DF	96	(South Korea) Choi Seok-hyun	(substituted on) 63'
MF	36	(Venezuela) Matías Lacava	(substituted on) 74'
MF	27	(South Korea) Lee Chung-yong	(substituted on) 85'
MF	5	(South Korea) Jung Woo-young	(substituted on) 85'
FW	18	(South Korea) Heo Yool	(substituted on) 85'
Manager:
(South Korea) Kim Pan-gon

Man of the Match:
Jhon Arias (Fluminense)

Assistant referees:
Stuart Burt (England)
James Mainwaring (England)
Fourth official:
Omar Al Ali (United Arab Emirates)
Video assistant referee:
Alejandro Hernández Hernández (Spain)
Assistant video assistant referee:
Ivan Bebek (Croatia)
Support video assistant referee:
Mohammed Obaid Khadim (United Arab Emirates)

=== Borussia Dortmund vs Ulsan HD ===
June 25, 2025
3:00 pm EDT

Borussia Dortmund (Germany)	1–0	(South Korea) Ulsan HD
Svensson 36'	Report

TQL Stadium, Cincinnati
Attendance: 8,239
Referee: Tori Penso (United States)

Borussia Dortmund	Ulsan HD

GK	1	(Switzerland) Gregor Kobel (c)
CB	2	(Brazil) Yan Couto
CB	3	(Germany) Waldemar Anton
CB	5	(Algeria) Ramy Bensebaini
RM	26	(Norway) Julian Ryerson
CM	8	(Germany) Felix Nmecha	(yellow card) 53'	(substituted off) 58'
CM	13	(Germany) Pascal Groß		(substituted off) 78'
LM	24	(Sweden) Daniel Svensson
RF	77	(England) Jobe Bellingham	(yellow card) 28'	(substituted off) 58'
CF	9	(Guinea) Serhou Guirassy		(substituted off) 78'
LF	27	(Germany) Karim Adeyemi		(substituted off) 58'
Substitutions:
FW	16	(Belgium) Julien Duranville		(substituted on) 58'
FW	14	(Germany) Maximilian Beier		(substituted on) 58'
FW	10	(Germany) Julian Brandt		(substituted on) 58'
FW	7	(United States) Giovanni Reyna		(substituted on) 78'
MF	17	(England) Carney Chukwuemeka		(substituted on) 78'
Manager:
(Croatia) Niko Kovač

GK	21	(South Korea) Jo Hyeon-woo
RB	13	(South Korea) Kang Sang-woo	(yellow card) 54'
CB	66	(Poland) Miłosz Trojak		(substituted off) 86'
CB	19	(South Korea) Kim Young-gwon (c)
LB	28	(South Korea) Lee Jae-ik
DM	6	(Sweden) Darijan Bojanić		(substituted off) 80'
CM	22	(South Korea) Kim Min-hyeok	(yellow card) 17'	(substituted off) 46'
CM	14	(South Korea) Lee Jin-hyun
RF	36	(Venezuela) Matías Lacava		(substituted off) 46'
CF	97	(Brazil) Erick Farias		(substituted off) 80'
LF	17	(Sweden) Gustav Ludwigson
Substitutions:
MF	7	(South Korea) Ko Seung-beom		(substituted on) 46'
DF	26	(South Korea) Park Min-seo		(substituted on) 46'
MF	27	(South Korea) Lee Chung-yong		(substituted on) 80'
MF	16	(South Korea) Lee Hui-gyun		(substituted on) 80'
FW	18	(South Korea) Heo Yool		(substituted on) 86'
Manager:
(South Korea) Kim Pan-gon

Man of the Match:
Daniel Svensson (Borussia Dortmund)

Assistant referees:
Brooke Mayo (United States)
Kathryn Nesbitt (United States)
Fourth official:
Omar Al Ali (United Arab Emirates)
Video assistant referee:
Erick Miranda (Mexico)
Assistant video assistant referee:
Guillermo Pacheco (Mexico)
Support video assistant referee:
Juan Lara (Chile)

=== Mamelodi Sundowns vs Fluminense ===
June 25, 2025
3:00 pm EDT

Mamelodi Sundowns (South Africa)	0–0	(Brazil) Fluminense
	Report

Hard Rock Stadium, Miami Gardens
Attendance: 14,312
Referee: Anthony Taylor (England)

Mamelodi Sundowns	Fluminense

GK	30	(South Africa) Ronwen Williams
RB	25	(South Africa) Khuliso Mudau
CB	24	(South Africa) Keanu Cupido		(substituted off) 60'
CB	20	(South Africa) Grant Kekana
LB	29	(Zimbabwe) Divine Lunga
CM	4	(South Africa) Teboho Mokoena	(yellow card) 10'	(substituted off) 46'
CM	11	(Chile) Marcelo Allende
RW	10	(Brazil) Lucas Ribeiro		(substituted off) 77'
AM	18	(South Africa) Themba Zwane (c)		(substituted off) 85'
LW	17	(South Africa) Tashreeq Matthews		(substituted off) 60'
CF	13	(South Africa) Iqraam Rayners
Substitutions:
MF	8	(South Africa) Jayden Adams		(substituted on) 46'
DF	5	(South Africa) Mosa Lebusa		(substituted on) 60'
FW	9	(Brazil) Arthur Sales		(substituted on) 60'
FW	38	(Namibia) Peter Shalulile		(substituted on) 77'
FW	16	(South Africa) Kutlwano Letlhaku	(yellow card) 90+6'	(substituted on) 85'
Other disciplinary actions:
TS	—	(Brazil) Fábio Fernandes	(yellow card) 89'
Manager:
(Portugal) Miguel Cardoso

GK	1	(Brazil) Fábio
RB	2	(Brazil) Samuel Xavier
CB	4	(Brazil) Ignácio
CB	22	(Argentina) Juan Pablo Freytes
LB	6	(Brazil) Renê	(yellow card) 90+5'
DM	35	(Brazil) Hércules		(substituted off) 67'
CM	16	(Brazil) Nonato		(substituted off) 86'
CM	8	(Brazil) Matheus Martinelli		(substituted off) 77'
RF	21	(Colombia) Jhon Arias (c)	(yellow card) 88'
CF	14	(Argentina) Germán Cano		(substituted off) 86'
LF	17	(Uruguay) Agustín Canobbio		(substituted off) 67'
Substitutions:
FW	11	(Brazil) Keno		(substituted on) 67'
MF	5	(Uruguay) Facundo Bernal	(yellow card) 89'	(substituted on) 67'
MF	45	(Brazil) Lima		(substituted on) 77'
DF	29	(Brazil) Thiago Santos		(substituted on) 86'
FW	9	(Brazil) Everaldo		(substituted on) 86'
Manager:
(Brazil) Renato Gaúcho

Man of the Match:
Ignácio (Fluminense)

Assistant referees:
Gary Beswick (England)
Adam Nunn (England)
Fourth official:
Iván Barton (El Salvador)
Video assistant referee:
Marco Di Bello (Italy)
Assistant video assistant referee:
Alejandro Hernández Hernández (Spain)
Support video assistant referee:
Rob Dieperink (Netherlands)

== Discipline ==
Fair play points would have been used as tiebreakers if the overall and head-to-head records of teams were tied. These were calculated based on yellow and red cards received in all group matches as follows:

- first yellow card: −1 point;
- indirect red card (second yellow card): −3 points;
- direct red card: −4 points;
- yellow card and direct red card: −5 points;

Only one of the above deductions was applied to a player in a single match.

Team	Match 1				Match 2				Match 3				Points
Team	Booked	(yellow card) (yellow-red card)	Sent off (straight red)	(yellow card) (red card)	Booked	(yellow card) (yellow-red card)	Sent off (straight red)	(yellow card) (red card)	Booked	(yellow card) (yellow-red card)	Sent off (straight red)	(yellow card) (red card)	Points
(South Korea) Ulsan HD	1								2				−3
(Brazil) Fluminense	2				1				3				−6
(Germany) Borussia Dortmund	2				2				2				−6
(South Africa) Mamelodi Sundowns	1				2				3				−6
