= 2025 Fluminense FC season =

Fluminense FC
2025 season
- President: Mário Bittencourt (until 19 December); Mattheus Montenegro (from 19 December)
- Manager: Mano Menezes (until 30 March); Renato Gaúcho (from 3 April to 23 September); Luis Zubeldía (from 25 September)
- Stadium: Maracanã
- Série A: 5th
- Campeonato Carioca: Taça Guanabara: 3rd Final stage: Runners-up
- Copa do Brasil: Semi-finals
- Copa Sudamericana: Quarter-finals
- FIFA Club World Cup: Semi-finals
- Top goalscorer: League: Kevin Serna (7); All: Germán Cano (20)
- Average home league attendance: 29,073
Home colours	Away colours	Third colours

The 2025 season was the 123rd in the history of Fluminense Football Club and their 23rd consecutive season in the Campeonato Brasileiro Série A. The club competed in the Campeonato Carioca, Copa do Brasil, Copa Sudamericana, and FIFA Club World Cup.

== Squad ==
=== First team ===
As of 5 February 2025

Note: Flags indicate national team as defined under FIFA eligibility rules; some limited exceptions apply. Players may hold more than one non-FIFA nationality.

No.	Pos.	Nation	Player
1	GK	BRA	Fábio
2	DF	BRA	Samuel Xavier
3	DF	BRA	Thiago Silva (captain)
4	DF	BRA	Ignácio
5	MF	URU	Facundo Bernal
6	DF	BRA	Renê
7	MF	BRA	Renato Augusto
8	MF	BRA	Matheus Martinelli
9	FW	BRA	Everaldo
10	MF	BRA	Ganso
11	FW	BRA	Keno
12	DF	COL	Gabriel Fuentes
13	DF	BRA	Felipe Andrade
14	FW	ARG	Germán Cano
16	MF	BRA	Nonato (on loan from Santos)
17	FW	URU	Agustín Canobbio
18	FW	BRA	Lelê
20	MF	BRA	Victor Hugo (on loan from Cascavel)

No.	Pos.	Nation	Player
21	MF	COL	Jhon Arias
22	DF	ARG	Juan Freytes
23	DF	BRA	Guga
25	FW	URU	Joaquín Lavega
26	DF	BRA	Manoel
27	GK	BRA	Marcelo Pitaluga
28	FW	BRA	Riquelme
29	DF	BRA	Thiago Santos
35	MF	BRA	Hércules
37	MF	BRA	Isaque
45	MF	BRA	Lima
50	GK	BRA	Gustavo Ramalho
55	MF	BRA	Wallace Davi
77	FW	BRA	Paulo Baya (on loan from Primavera)
90	FW	COL	Kevin Serna
94	MF	BRA	Otávio
98	GK	BRA	Vitor Eudes
—	MF	PAR	Rubén Lezcano

=== Transfers In ===
Pos.	Player	Transferred from	Fee	Date	Source
MF	(Brazil) Gustavo Apis	(Brazil) Nova Iguaçu	Loan return	31 December 2024	
MF	(Uruguay) Joaquín Lavega	(Uruguay) River Plate	Free	1 January 2025	
MF	(Brazil) Hércules	(Brazil) Fortaleza	€4,600,000	1 January 2025	
DF	(Argentina) Juan Pablo Freytes	(Peru) Alianza Lima	€2,200,000	2 January 2025	
GK	(Brazil) Marcelo Pitaluga	(England) Liverpool	Free	6 January 2025	
DF	(Brazil) Renê	(Brazil) Internacional	Free	9 January 2025	
MF	(Uruguay) Agustín Canobbio	(Brazil) Athletico Paranaense	Undisclosed	10 January 2025	
MF	(Brazil) Otávio	(Brazil) Atlético Mineiro	Undisclosed	19 February 2025	
FW	(Brazil) Everaldo	(Brazil) Bahia	€700,000	19 February 2025	
MF	(Paraguay) Rubén Lezcano	(Paraguay) Libertad	Undisclosed	28 February 2025	
FW	(Brazil) Lelê	(Brazil) Ceará	Loan return	9 June 2025	
MF	(Venezuela) Yeferson Soteldo	(Brazil) Santos	€4,800,000	10 June 2025	
FW	(Argentina) Luciano Acosta	(United States) FC Dallas	US$4,000,000	8 August 2025	
MF	(Colombia) Santiago Moreno	(United States) Portland Timbers	Undisclosed	12 August 2025	
DF	(Brazil) Luan Freitas	(Brazil) Paysandu	Loan return	19 August 2025	
DF	(Brazil) Igor Rabello	(Brazil) Atlético Mineiro	Free	22 August 2025	

=== Transfers out ===
Pos.	Player	Transferred to	Fee	Date	Source
MF	(Brazil) Gabriel Pires	(Greece) Panserraikos	Free	1 January 2025	
DF	(Brazil) Diogo Barbosa	(Brazil) Fortaleza	Free	1 January 2025	
DF	(Brazil) Felipe Melo		End of contract	1 January 2025	
FW	(Brazil) John Kennedy	(Mexico) Pachuca	Loan	7 January 2025	
DF	(Brazil) Antônio Carlos	(Brazil) Sport Recife	Undisclosed	9 January 2025	
FW	(Brazil) Isaac	(Brazil) Athletico Paranaense	Undisclosed	13 January 2025	
MF	(Uruguay) David Terans	(Uruguay) Peñarol	Loan	17 January 2025	
DF	(Brazil) Jhonny	(Brazil) Volta Redonda FC	Loan	20 February 2025	
DF	(Brazil) Felipe Andrade	(United States) Houston Dynamo	Loan	26 February 2025	
FW	(Brazil) Lelê	(Brazil) Ceará	Loan	27 March 2025	
MF	(Brazil) Gustavo Apis	(Thailand) Pattaya United	Contract terminated	2 June 2025	
FW	(Brazil) Lelê	(Japan) Nagoya Grampus	Loan	10 June 2025	
MF	(Colombia) Jhon Arias	(England) Wolverhampton Wanderers	£15,000,000	24 July 2025	
DF	(Brazil) Antônio Carlos	(United States) Houston Dynamo FC	Free	31 July 2025	
DF	(Brazil) Luan Freitas	(Brazil) Juventude	Loan	22 August 2025	
MF	(Brazil) Isaque	(Ukraine) Shakhtar Donetsk	€10,000,000	28 August 2025	

== Competitions ==
=== Overall record ===
Competition	First match	Last match	Starting round	Final position	Record							
Competition	First match	Last match	Starting round	Final position	Pld	W	D	L	GF	GA	GD	Win %
Série A	29 March 2025	7 December 2025	Matchday 1	5th	38	19	7	12	50	39	+11	50.00
Campeonato Carioca	12 January 2025	16 March 2025	Taça Guanabara	Runners-up	15	5	7	3	18	12	+6	33.33
Copa do Brasil	26 February 2025	14 December 2025	First Round	Semi-finals	10	7	1	2	22	7	+15	70.00
Copa Sudamericana	2 April 2025	23 September 2025	Group stage	Quarter-finals	10	6	2	2	16	5	+11	60.00
FIFA Club World Cup	17 June 2025	8 July 2025	Group stage	Semi-finals	6	3	2	1	8	5	+3	50.00
Total					79	40	19	20	114	68	+46	50.63

Last updated: 14 December 2025
Source: Competitions

=== Série A ===
==== League table ====
Pos	Team	Pld	W	D	L	GF	GA	GD	Pts	Qualification or relegation
3	Cruzeiro	38	19	13	6	55	31	+24	70	Qualification for Copa Libertadores group stage (Note: Flamengo qualified for the Copa Libertadores group stage by winning the 2025 Copa Libertadores.)
4	Mirassol	38	18	13	7	63	39	+24	67	Qualification for Copa Libertadores group stage
5	Fluminense	38	19	7	12	50	39	+11	64	Qualification for Copa Libertadores group stage
6	Botafogo	38	17	12	9	58	38	+20	63	Qualification for Copa Libertadores second stage
7	Bahia	38	17	9	12	50	47	+3	60	Qualification for Copa Libertadores second stage

Source: CBF
Rules for classification: 1) points; 2) wins; 3) goal difference; 4) goals scored; 5) head-to-head results (only between two teams); 6) fewest red cards; 7) fewest yellow cards; 8) drawing of lots.

==== Results summary ====
Overall								Home						Away					
Pld	W	D	L	GF	GA	GD	Pts	W	D	L	GF	GA	GD	W	D	L	GF	GA	GD
15	6	2	7	17	20	−3	20	4	1	2	9	8	+1	2	1	5	8	12	−4

Last updated: 27 July 2025.

==== Matches ====
The schedule was announced on 12 February 2025.

29 March 2025 1	Fortaleza	2–0	Fluminense	Fortaleza
18:30 UTC−3	Lucero 4'; Tinga 21'	Report		Stadium: Castelão; Attendance: 19,484; Referee: Rodrigo Jose Pereira De Lima

6 April 2025 2	Fluminense	2–1	Red Bull Bragantino	Rio de Janeiro
16:00 UTC−3	Lima 35'; Martinelli 90+2'	Report	Pitta 83'	Stadium: Maracanã; Attendance: 19,729; Referee: Wilton Sampaio

13 April 2025 3	Fluminense	1–0	Santos	Rio de Janeiro
19:30 UTC-03:00	Samuel Xavier 90+6'	Report		Stadium: Maracanã; Attendance: 46,172; Referee: Felipe Fernandes de Lima

16 April 2025 4	Corinthians	0–2	Fluminense	São Paulo
19:30 UTC−3		Report	Renê 63'; Arias 82' (pen.)	Stadium: Neo Química Arena; Attendance: 41,355; Referee: Rodrigo José Pereira de Lima

20 April 2025 5	Fluminense	1–1	Vitória	Rio de Janeiro
18:30 UTC-03:00	Cano 39'	Report	Lucas Braga 90'	Stadium: Maracanã; Attendance: 29,065; Referee: Matheus Delgado Candançan

26 April 2025 6	Botafogo	2–0	Fluminense	Rio de Janeiro
21:00 UTC−3	Vitinho 37'; Savarino 90+5'	Report		Stadium: Estádio Nilton Santos; Attendance: 12,943; Referee: Bruno Arleu de Araujo

3 May 2025 7	Fluminense	2–1	Sport	Rio de Janeiro
18:30 UTC-03:00	Serna 60'; Everaldo 90+7'	Report	Pablo 24'	Stadium: Maracanã; Attendance: 18,754; Referee: Rafael Rodrigo Klein

11 May 2025 8	Atlético Mineiro	3–2	Fluminense	Belo Horizonte
17:30 UTC−3	Rubens 77'; Júnior Santos 84'; Igor Gomes 90+4'	Report	Canobbio 56'; Serna 88'	Stadium: Arena MRV; Attendance: 25,018; Referee: Ramon Abatti Abel

18 May 2025 9	Juventude	1–1	Fluminense	Caxias do Sul
16:00 UTC−3	Batalla 55'	Report	Hércules 58'	Stadium: Estádio Alfredo Jaconi; Attendance: 8,115; Referee: Wilton Sampaio

24 May 2025 10	Fluminense	2–1	Vasco da Gama	Rio de Janeiro
18:30 UTC-03:00	Vegetti 42' (o.g.); Guga 87'	Report	João Victor 25'	Stadium: Maracanã; Attendance: 46,177; Referee: Rodrigo Jose Pereira De Lima

1 June 2025 11	Internacional	0–2	Fluminense	Porto Alegre
20:30 UTC−3	Alan Patrick (yellow card) 72'	Report	Serna 11'; Baya 83'	Stadium: Estádio Beira-Rio; Attendance: 13,502; Referee: Lucas Paulo Torezin

17 July 2025 14	Fluminense	0–2	Cruzeiro	Rio de Janeiro
19:30 UTC−3		Report	Fabrício Bruno 30'; Kaio Jorge 35'	Stadium: Maracanã; Attendance: 45,681; Referee: Rafael Rodrigo Klein

20 July 2025 15	Flamengo	1–0	Fluminense	Rio de Janeiro
19:30 UTC−3	Pedro 85'	Report		Stadium: Maracanã; Attendance: 58,416; Referee: Raphael Claus

23 July 2025 16	Fluminense	1–2	Palmeiras	Rio de Janeiro
19:00 UTC−3	Cano 36' (pen.)	Report	Maurício 45+4'; Vitor Roque 62'	Stadium: Maracanã; Referee: Ramon Abatti Abel

27 July 2025 17	São Paulo	3–1	Fluminense	São Paulo
16:00 UTC−3	Arboleda 24'; Ferreira 59'; Tapia 90+1'	Report	Xavier 77'	Stadium: Morumbi; Referee: Davi de Oliveira Lacerda

2 August 2025 18	Fluminense	1–0	Grêmio	Rio de Janeiro
21:00 UTC−3	Everaldo 44'	Report		Stadium: Maracanã; Attendance: 17,015; Referee: Lucas Paulo Torezin

9 August 2025 19	Bahia	3–3	Fluminense	Salvador
21:00 UTC−3	Bernal 13' (o.g.); Ribeiro 19'; Juba 89'	Report	Cano 9', 49'; Nonato 72'	Stadium: Arena Fonte Nova; Referee: Jefferson Ferreira de Moraes

16 August 2025 20	Fluminense	2–1	Fortaleza	Rio de Janeiro
16:00 UTC−3	Cano 9'; Canobbio 64'	Report	Breno Lopes 73'	Stadium: Estádio Jornalista Mário Filho (Maracanã)

23 August 2025 21	Red Bull Bragantino	4–2	Fluminense	Bragança Paulista
16:00 UTC−3	Jhon Jhon 2'; Sasha 4'; Laquintana 48'; Davi Gomes 81'	Report	Hércules 45+2'; Acosta 63'	Stadium: Cícero de Souza Marques

31 August 2025 22	Santos	0–0	Fluminense	Santos
16:00 UTC−3		Report		Stadium: Vila Belmiro; Attendance: 12,515; Referee: Wilton Pereira Sampaio

13 September 2025 23	Fluminense	0–1	Corinthians	Rio de Janeiro
21:00 UTC−3		Report	Matheuzinho 73'	Stadium: Maracanã; Attendance: 21,091; Referee: Felipe Fernandes de Lima

20 September 2025 24	Vitória	0–1	Fluminense	Salvador
16:00 UTC−3		Report	Hércules 37'	Stadium: Estádio Manoel Barradas (Barradão); Attendance: 27,183; Referee: Matheus Delgado Candançan

28 September 2025 25	Fluminense	2–0	Botafogo	Rio de Janeiro
16:00 UTC−3	Cano 33'; Lima 89'	Report		Stadium: Maracanã; Attendance: 18,252; Referee: Ramon Abatti Abel

1 October 2025 26	Sport	2–2	Fluminense	Recife
19:00 (UTC-3)	Lucas Lima 73'; Luan Cândido 90+7'	Report	Acosta 64'; John Kennedy 83' (pen.)	Stadium: Estádio Ilha do Retiro; Attendance: 14,172; Referee: Raphael Claus

4 October 2025 27	Fluminense	3–0	Atlético Mineiro	Rio de Janeiro
18:30 UTC−3	Samuel Xavier 15'; Serna 58'; Keno 90+1'	Report		Stadium: Maracanã; Attendance: 20,198; Referee: Davi de Oliveira Lacerda

8 October 2025 13	Mirassol	2–1	Fluminense	Mirassol
21:00 (UTC-3)	Guilherme 36'; Negueba 86'	Report	Martinelli 56'	Stadium: Estádio José Maria de Campos Maia

16 October 2025 28	Fluminense	1–0	Juventude	Rio de Janeiro
21:30 UTC−3	Thiago Silva 90+8'	Report		Stadium: Maracanã; Attendance: 15,639; Referee: Jefferson Ferreira de Moraes

20 October 2025 29	Vasco da Gama	2–0	Fluminense	Rio de Janeiro
19:30 (UTC-3)	Rayan 38'; Moreira 52'	Report		Stadium: Estádio Vasco da Gama (São Januário); Attendance: 53,746; Referee: Wagner do Nascimento Magalhães

25 October 2025 30	Fluminense	1–0	Internacional	Rio de Janeiro
(UTC-3)	Samuel Xavier 61'	Report		Stadium: Maracanã; Attendance: 21,298; Referee: Raphael Claus

29 October 2025 12	Fluminense	1–0	Ceará	Rio de Janeiro
19:00 (UTC-3)	Renê 26'	Report		Stadium: Maracanã; Attendance: 12,780; Referee: Flavio Rodrigues de Souza

2 November 2025 31	Ceará	2–0	Fluminense	Fortaleza
15:00 UTC−3	Galeano 38'; Pedro Raul 72'	Report		Stadium: Castelão; Attendance: 28,700

6 November 2025 32	Fluminense	1–0	Mirassol	Rio de Janeiro
19:30 (UTC-3)	Serna 31'	Report		Stadium: Maracanã; Attendance: 15,952; Referee: Anderson Daronco

9 November 2025 33	Cruzeiro	0–0	Fluminense	Belo Horizonte
16:00 UTC−3		Report		Stadium: Mineirão; Attendance: 53,283; Referee: Rodrigo José Pereira de Lima

19 November 2025 34	Fluminense	2–1	Flamengo	Rio de Janeiro
21:30 UTC−3	Acosta 25'; Serna 33'	Report	Jorginho 85' (pen.)	Stadium: Maracanã; Attendance: 69,591; Referee: Davi De Oliveira Lacerda

22 November 2025 35	Palmeiras	0–0	Fluminense	São Paulo
21:30 UTC−3		Report		Stadium: Allianz Parque; Attendance: 40,245; Referee: Jonathan Benkenstein Pinheiro

27 November 2025 36	Fluminense	6–0	São Paulo	Rio de Janeiro
20:30 UTC−3	Canobbio 8' (pen.), 76'; Martinelli 15'; Nonato 23'; John Kennedy 69'; Serna 86'	Report		Stadium: Maracanã; Attendance: 30,427; Referee: Lucas Paulo Torezin

3 December 2025 37	Grêmio	1–2	Fluminense	Porto Alegre
21:30 UTC−3	André 54'	Report	Soteldo 19', 52'	Stadium: Arena do Grêmio; Attendance: 23,487; Referee: Raphael Claus

7 December 2025 38	Fluminense	2–0	Bahia	Rio de Janeiro
16:00 UTC−3	Ganso 75'; Thiago Silva 82'	Report		Stadium: Maracanã; Attendance: 52,268; Referee: Matheus Delgado Candançan

=== Campeonato Carioca ===
==== Taça Guanabara ====
===== Results by round =====
Round	1	2	3
Ground	H	A	H
Result	D	L	D
Position	7		

Updated to match(es) played on 18 January 2025. Source:
A = Away; H = Home; W = Win; D = Draw; L = Loss

===== League Table =====
Pos	Team	Pld	W	D	L	GF	GA	GD	Pts	Qualification
1	Flamengo (C)	11	7	2	2	25	5	+20	23	Taça Guanabara Champion and advance to semi-finals
2	Volta Redonda	11	6	2	3	13	12	+1	20	Advance to semi-finals
3	Fluminense	11	4	5	2	13	9	+4	17	Advance to semi-finals
4	Vasco da Gama	11	4	5	2	13	9	+4	17	Advance to semi-finals
5	Sampaio Corrêa	11	4	4	3	13	11	+2	16	Advance to Taça Rio semi-finals

Source: FERJ
Rules for classification: 1) points; 2) wins; 3) goal difference; 4) goals scored; 5) head-to-head results; 6) disciplinary record; 7) random draw.
(C) Champions

===== Matches =====
12 January 2025 1	Fluminense	0–0	Sampaio Corrêa	Rio de Janeiro
19:00 UTC−3		Report		Stadium: Estádio Moça Bonita; Attendance: 4,103; Referee: Lucas Coelho Santos

15 January 2025 2	Volta Redonda	1–0	Fluminense	Volta Redonda
21:30 UTC−3	Mirandinha 87'	Report		Stadium: Estádio Raulino de Oliveira; Attendance: 5,275; Referee: Alex Gomes Stefano

18 January 2025 2	Fluminense	1–1	Maricá	Rio de Janeiro
19:00 UTC−3	Kauã Elias 90+7' (pen.)	Report	Denilson 72'	Stadium: Estádio Moça Bonita; Attendance: 3,134; Referee: Thiago da Silva Ludugério

23 January 2025 4	Portuguesa	1–3	Fluminense	Rio de Janeiro
21:30 UTC−3	Romarinho 37'	Report	Keno 10'; Cano 31' (pen.), 59'	Stadium: Estádio Luso Brasileiro; Attendance: 2,822; Referee: Wagner do Nascimento Magalhães

26 January 2025 5	Madureira	0–0	Fluminense	Cariacica, Espírito Santo
16:00 UTC−3		Report		Stadium: Estádio Kleber Andrade; Attendance: 4,341; Referee: João Marcos Gonçalves Fernandes

29 January 2025 6	Botafogo	2–1	Fluminense	Rio de Janeiro
21:30 UTC−3	Igor Jesus 56'; Savarino 81' (pen.)	Report	Cano 68' (pen.)	Stadium: Estádio Olímpico Nilton Santos; Attendance: 7,549; Referee: Bruno Arleu de Araújo

2 February 2025 7	Fluminense	1–1	Boavista	Rio de Janeiro
21:00 UTC−3	Samuel Xavier 84'	Report	Marcos Paulo 58'	Stadium: Maracanã; Attendance: 8,603; Referee: Alex Gomes Stefano

5 February 2025 8	Vasco da Gama	1–2	Fluminense	Brasília, Distrito Federal
21:30 UTC−3	Coutinho 2'	Report	Thiago Silva 34'; Cano 40'	Stadium: Estádio Nacional Mané Garrincha; Attendance: 30,164; Referee: Wagner do Nascimento Magalhães

8 February 2025 9 Fla–Flu	Fluminense	0–0	Flamengo	Rio de Janeiro
16:30 UTC−3		Report		Stadium: Maracanã; Attendance: 37,838; Referee: Alex Gomes Stefano

16 February 2025 10	Fluminense	2–0	Nova Iguaçu	Rio de Janeiro
16:00 UTC−3	Cano 1'; Canobbio 17'	Report		Stadium: Maracanã; Attendance: 12,731; Referee: Yuri Elino Ferreira da Cruz

23 February 2025 11	Fluminense	3–2	Bangu	Rio de Janeiro
18:30 UTC−3	Juan Sánchez 14' (o.g.); Canobbio 52'; Serna 57'	Report	Freytes 43' (o.g.); João Veras 63' (pen.)	Stadium: Maracanã; Attendance: 14,532; Referee: Pierry Dias dos Santos

==== Semi-finals ====
2 March 2025 First Leg	Fluminense	4–0	Volta Redonda	Rio de Janeiro
18:00	Canobbio 7', 18'; Arias 42'; Cano 71'	Report		Stadium: Marcanã; Attendance: 17,877; Referee: Yuri Elino Ferreira da Cruz

9 March 2025 Second Leg	Volta Redonda	0–0	Fluminense	Volta Redonda
18:00		Report		Stadium: Estádio Raulino de Oliveira; Attendance: 7,135; Referee: Alex Gomes Stefano

==== Finals ====
12 March 2025 First leg Fla–Flu	Fluminense	1–2	Flamengo	Rio de Janeiro
21:30 UTC−3	Keno 88'	Report	Wesley 6'; Juninho 76'	Stadium: Maracanã; Attendance: 39,120; Referee: Yuri Elino Ferreira da Cruz

16 March 2025 Second leg Fla–Flu	Flamengo	0–0 (2–1 agg.)	Fluminense	Rio de Janeiro
16:00 UTC−3		Report		Stadium: Maracanã; Attendance: 69,393; Referee: Bruno Arleu de Araújo

=== Copa do Brasil ===
26 February 2025 First Round	Águia de Marabá	0–8	Fluminense	Belém
19:30		Report	Canobbio 11'; Cano 14', 31'; Ignácio 45'; Paulo Baya 68'; Arias 70'; Everaldo 78'; Serna 81'	Stadium: Mangueirão; Attendance: 4,455; Referee: Davi de Oliveira Lacerda (Espírito Santo)

5 March 2025 Second Round	Caxias	1–2	Fluminense	Caxias do Sul
19:00	Alisson 68'	Report	Cano 40', 65'	Stadium: Estádio Centenário; Attendance: 4,870; Referee: Raphael Claus (São Paulo)

==== Third round ====
The draw was held on 9 April 2025.

29 April 2025 First leg	Fluminense	1–0	Aparecidense	Rio de Janeiro
21:30 UTC−3	Keno 81'	Report		Stadium: Maracanã; Referee: Jonathan Benkenstein Pinheiro

21 May 2025 Second leg	Aparecidense	1–4 (1–5 agg.)	Fluminense	Brasília
19:30 UTC−3	Wellington Carvalho 31'	Report	Samuel Xavier 41'; Everaldo 45+2'; Vanderley 64' (o.g.); Ganso 71'	Stadium: Mané Garrincha; Attendance: 10,113; Referee: Felipe Fernandes de Lima

==== Round of 16 ====
30 July 2025 First leg	Internacional	1–2	Fluminense	Porto Alegre
21:30 UTC−3	Carbonero 35'	Report	Everaldo 9', 40'	Stadium: Beira-Rio; Attendance: 33,801; Referee: Rodrigo José Pereira de Lima

7 August 2025 Second leg	Fluminense	1–1 (3–2 agg.)	Internacional	Rio de Janeiro
21:30 UTC−3	Canobbio 46'	Report	Alan Patrick 64' (pen.)	Stadium: Maracanã; Referee: Ramon Abatti

==== Quarter-finals ====
28 August 2025 First leg	Bahia	1–0	Fluminense	Salvador
19:30	Luciano Juba 85'	Report		Stadium: Arena Fonte Nova; Attendance: 43,276; Referee: Raphael Claus

10 September 2025 Second leg	Fluminense	2–0 (2–1 agg.)	Bahia	Rio de Janeiro
19:00	Canobbio 55' (pen.); Thiago Silva 85'	Report		Stadium: Maracanã; Referee: Matheus Delgado Candançan

==== Semi-finals ====
11 December 2025 First leg	Vasco da Gama	2–1	Fluminense	Rio de Janeiro
20:00	Rayan 49'; Vegetti 90+4'	Report	Serna 22'	Stadium: Maracanã; Referee: Raphael Claus

14 December 2025 Second leg	Fluminense	1–0 (2–2 agg.) (3–4 p)	Vasco da Gama	Rio de Janeiro
20:30	Paulo Henrique 35' (o.g.)	Report		Stadium: Maracanã; Attendance: 67,560; Referee: Wilton Pereira Sampaio
	Penalties
	Thiago Silva (penalty scored); John Kennedy (penalty missed); Ganso (penalty scored); Renê (penalty scored); Canobbio (penalty missed)		(penalty missed) Vegetti; (penalty scored) Rayan; (penalty scored) Victor Luís; (penalty scored) Coutinho; (penalty scored) Puma Rodríguez

=== Copa Sudamericana ===
==== Group stage ====
Pos	Team	Pld	W	D	L	GF	GA	GD	Pts	Qualification	FLU	ONC	UES	GVS
1	(Brazil) Fluminense	6	4	1	1	11	2	+9	13	Round of 16	—	2–0	2–0	5–0
2	(Colombia) Once Caldas	6	4	0	2	8	6	+2	12	Knockout round play-offs	0–1	—	1–0	2–1
3	(Chile) Unión Española	6	1	2	3	6	7	−1	5		1–1	0–2	—	4–0
4	(Bolivia) GV San José	6	1	1	4	5	15	−10	4		1–0	2–3	1–1	—

Source: CONMEBOL

1 April 2025 1	Once Caldas (Colombia)	0–1	(Brazil) Fluminense	Manizales, Colombia
19:30 UTC−5		Report	31' Cano	Stadium: Estadio Palogrande; Attendance: 20,937; Referee: Nicolás Ramírez (Argentina)

10 April 2025 2	Fluminense (Brazil)	5–0	(Bolivia) GV San José	Rio de Janeiro, Brazil
21:30 UTC−3	Everaldo 21', 44'; Serna 59'; Cano 73', 79'	Report		Stadium: Estádio do Maracanã; Attendance: 20,307; Referee: Roberto Pérez (Peru)

23 April 2025 3	Unión Española (Chile)	1–1	(Brazil) Fluminense	Santiago, Chile
18:00 UTC−4	Aránguiz 83'	Report	Nonato 90+3'	Stadium: Estadio Bicentenario de La Florida (Note: Unión Española played their home match against Fluminense at Estadio Bicentenario de La Florida, Santiago (originally scheduled at Estadio El Teniente, Rancagua) instead of their regular stadium Estadio Santa Laura-Universidad SEK, Santiago which did not meet CONMEBOL requirements.); Attendance: 3,862; Referee: Andrés Matonte (Uruguay)

8 May 2025 4	GV San José (Bolivia)	1–0	(Brazil) Fluminense	La Paz, Bolivia
20:30 UTC−4	Calero 69'	Report		Stadium: Estadio Hernando Siles (Note: GV San José played their home matches at Estadio Hernando Siles, La Paz instead of their regular stadium Estadio Jesús Bermúdez, Oruro which did not meet CONMEBOL requirements.); Referee: Alexis Herrera (Venezuela)

14 May 2025 5	Fluminense (Brazil)	2–0	(Chile) Unión Española	Rio de Janeiro, Brazil
19:00 UTC−3	Keno 47'; Samuel Xavier 77'	Report		Stadium: Estádio do Maracanã; Referee: Yael Falcón Pérez (Argentina)

29 May 2025 6	Fluminense (Brazil)	2–0	(Colombia) Once Caldas	Rio de Janeiro, Brazil
21:30 UTC−3	Martinelli 2'; Serna 34'	Report		Stadium: Estádio do Maracanã; Attendance: 33,668; Referee: Dario Herrera (Argentina)

==== Round of 16 ====
12 August 2025 First leg	América de Cali (Colombia)	1–2	(Brazil) Fluminense	Cali, Colombia
19:30 UTC−5	Barrios 90+3'	Report	Candelo 7' (o.g.); Canobbio 15'	Stadium: Estadio Pascual Guerrero; Attendance: 32,182; Referee: Cristian Garay (Chile)

19 August 2025 Second leg	Fluminense (Brazil)	2–0 (4–1 agg.)	(Colombia) América de Cali	Rio de Janeiro, Brazil
21:30 UTC−3	Serna 23'; Martinelli 56'	Report		Stadium: Estádio do Maracanã; Referee: Alexis Herrera (Venezuela)

==== Quarter-finals ====
18 September 2025 First leg	Lanús (Argentina)	1–0	(Brazil) Fluminense	Lanús, Argentina
21:30 UTC−3	Moreno 89'	Report		Stadium: Estadio Ciudad de Lanús; Referee: Gustavo Tejera (Uruguay)

23 September 2025 Second leg	Fluminense (Brazil)	1–1 (1–2 agg.)	(Argentina) Lanús	Rio de Janeiro, Brazil
21:30 UTC−3	Canobbio 20'	Report	Aquino 67'	Stadium: Estádio do Maracanã; Referee: Jesús Valenzuela (Venezuela)

=== FIFA Club World Cup ===
==== Group stage ====
Pos	Team	Pld	W	D	L	GF	GA	GD	Pts	Qualification
1	(Germany) Borussia Dortmund	3	2	1	0	5	3	+2	7	Advance to knockout stage
2	(Brazil) Fluminense	3	1	2	0	4	2	+2	5	Advance to knockout stage
3	(South Africa) Mamelodi Sundowns	3	1	1	1	4	4	0	4	
4	(South Korea) Ulsan HD	3	0	0	3	2	6	−4	0	

Source: FIFA
Rules for classification: Group stage tiebreakers

17 June 2025 1	Fluminense (Brazil)	0–0	(Germany) Borussia Dortmund	East Rutherford, United States
12:00 EDT (UTC−4)	Martinelli (yellow card) 9'; Nonato (yellow card) 81'	Report	Bensebaini (yellow card) 2'; Couto (yellow card) 90+4'	Stadium: MetLife Stadium; Attendance: 34,736; Referee: Ilgiz Tantashev (Uzbekistan)

21 June 2025 2	Fluminense (Brazil)	4–2	(South Korea) Ulsan HD	East Rutherford, United States
18:00 EDT (UTC−4)	Arias 7'; Nonato 66'; Freytes 83'; Keno 90+2', (yellow card) 90+3'	Report	Lee Jin-hyun 37'; Um Won-sang 45+3'	Stadium: MetLife Stadium; Attendance: 29,321; Referee: Michael Oliver (England)

25 June 2025 3	Mamelodi Sundowns (South Africa)	0–0	(Brazil) Fluminense	Miami Gardens, United States
15:00 EDT (UTC−4)	Mokoena (yellow card) 10'; Letlhaku (yellow card) 90+6'	Report	Arias (yellow card) 88'; Bernal (yellow card) 89'; Renê (yellow card) 90+5'	Stadium: Hard Rock Stadium; Attendance: 14,312; Referee: Anthony Taylor (England)

==== Knock-out stage ====
30 June 2025 Round of 16	Inter Milan (Italy)	0–2	(Brazil) Fluminense	Charlotte, United States
3:00 pm EDT	Asllani (yellow card) 8'; Bastoni (yellow card) 38'	Report	Cano 3', (yellow card) 16'; Freytes (yellow card) 26'; Renê (yellow card) 35'; Thiago Santos (yellow card) 85'; Hércules 90+3'	Stadium: Bank of America Stadium; Attendance: 20,030; Referee: Iván Barton (El Salvador)

4 July 2025 Quarter-finals	Fluminense (Brazil)	2–1	(Saudi Arabia) Al-Hilal	Orlando, United States
3:00 pm EDT	Freytes (yellow card) 36'; Martinelli 40', (yellow card) 43'; Thiago Silva (yellow card) 64'; Hércules 70'	Report	Milinković-Savić (yellow card) 10'; Lodi (yellow card) 21'; Leonardo 51'; Neves (yellow card) 90'; Koulibaly (yellow card) 90+7'	Stadium: Camping World Stadium; Attendance: 43,091; Referee: Danny Makkelie (Netherlands)

8 July 2025 Semi-finals	Fluminense (Brazil)	0–2	(England) Chelsea	East Rutherford, United States
3:00 pm EDT	Nonato (yellow card) 59'; Soteldo (yellow card) 72'	Report	João Pedro 18', 56'; Sánchez (yellow card) 73'	Stadium: MetLife Stadium; Attendance: 70,556; Referee: François Letexier (France)
