= Nonato (footballer, born 1998) =

Brazilian footballer

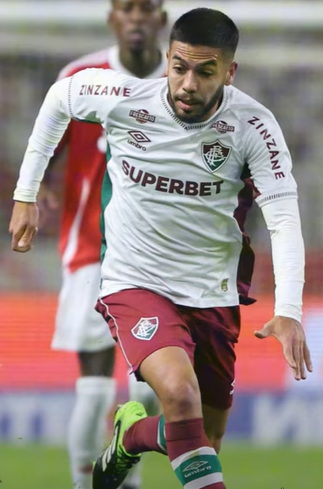
- Nonato playing for Fluminense in 2025

Personal information
- Full name: Gustavo Nonato Santana
- Date of birth: 3 March 1998 (age 28)
- Place of birth: São Paulo, Brazil
- Height: 1.75 m (5 ft 9 in)
- Position: Midfielder

Team information
- Current team: Fluminense
- Number: 16

Youth career
- 2008–2014: Corinthians
- 2014–2018: São Caetano
- 2018: → Internacional (loan)

Senior career*
Years	Team	Apps	(Gls)
2016–2019	São Caetano	9	(0)
2019	→ Internacional (loan)	33	(3)
2020–2022	Internacional	33	(4)
2021–2022	→ Fluminense (loan)	43	(3)
2022–2023	Ludogorets Razgrad	24	(1)
2023	→ Santos (loan)	14	(1)
2024–2025	Santos	8	(0)
2024–2025	→ Fluminense (loan)	35	(2)
2026–	Fluminense	6	(1)
- * Club domestic league appearances and goals as of 6 April 2026

Gustavo Nonato Santana (born 3 March 1998), commonly known as Nonato, is a Brazilian footballer who plays as a midfielder for Fluminense.

== Career ==
=== São Caetano ===
Born São Paulo, Nonato joined São Caetano's youth setup in 2014, from Corinthians. He made his first team debut on 30 March 2016, starting and providing an assist to both goals in a 2–0 Campeonato Paulista Série A2 away win over Monte Azul.

Nonato subsequently alternated between the under-20 and first team squads, winning the 2017 Paulistão A2 with the club.

=== Internacional ===
On 23 May 2018, Nonato was loaned to Série A side Internacional for one year, and was initially assigned to the under-20 team. On 9 February of the following year, his loan was extended until the end of 2019, and he made his first team debut eight days later, starting in a 2–1 Campeonato Gaúcho home win over Caxias.

Nonato made his top tier debut with Inter on 27 April 2019, playing the full 90 minutes in a 2–0 away loss against Chapecoense. He scored his first senior goal on 12 May, netting the opener in a 3–1 home win over Cruzeiro.

On 23 September 2019, Inter announced the permanent transfer of Nonato, with the player signing a contract until December 2023. A regular starter under Odair Hellmann, he lost his starting spot under Eduardo Coudet, and despite being utilized by subsequent head coaches Abel Braga and Miguel Ángel Ramírez, he featured very rarely after the arrival of Diego Aguirre.

==== Loan to Fluminense ====
On 30 July 2021, Nonato was loaned to fellow top tier side Fluminense until December 2022. He made his debut for the club on 23 August, replacing Martinelli in a 1–1 home draw against Atlético Mineiro.

On 1 September 2022, Fluminense announced Nonato's departure from the club, after the player was close to a deal with a Bulgarian club.

=== Ludogorets ===
On 2 September 2022, Nonato signed with Bulgarian champions Ludogorets Razgrad. On 8 September 2022, he made his official debut for the Razgrad team, coming on as a second half substitute and scoring a late winning goal in the 2–1 home victory over Roma in a UEFA Europa League match.

=== Santos ===
On 4 August 2023, Nonato was announced at Santos back in his home country, on loan until July 2024. He made his debut for the club sixteen days later, replacing Rodrigo Fernández late into a 2–1 home win over Grêmio.

Nonato scored his first goal for Peixe on 1 November 2023, netting the equalizer in a 2–1 away win over Flamengo. On 25 January 2024, he signed a permanent three-year contract with the club.

=== Fluminense return ===
On 11 July 2024, after being rarely used, Nonato returned to Fluminense on a one-year loan deal.

== Career statistics ==
As of 16 December 2025.

Club	Season	League			State League		Cup		Continental		Other		Total	
Club	Season	Division	Apps	Goals	Apps	Goals	Apps	Goals	Apps	Goals	Apps	Goals	Apps	Goals
São Caetano	2016	Paulista A2	—		2	0	—		—		1 (Note: Appearance(s) in Copa Paulista)	0	4	0
São Caetano	2017	Paulista A2	—		2	0	—		—		7	0	9	0
São Caetano	2018	Paulista	—		5	0	0	0	—		—		5	0
São Caetano	Total		—		9	0	0	0	—		8	0	17	0
Internacional	2019	Série A	26	3	7	0	8	0	5 (Note: Appearance(s) in Copa Libertadores)	0	—		46	3
Internacional	2020	Série A	11	1	8	2	3	0	4	0	—		26	3
Internacional	2021	Série A	3	0	11	1	0	0	5	0	—		19	1
Internacional	Total		40	4	26	3	11	0	14	0	—		91	7
Fluminense (loan)	2021	Série A	16	0	—		2	0	0	0	—		18	0
Fluminense (loan)	2022	Série A	17	0	10	3	6	1	4 (Note: Appearance(s) in Copa Sudamericana)	0	—		37	4
Fluminense (loan)	Total		33	0	10	3	8	1	4	0	—		55	4
Ludogorets Razgrad	2022–23	First League	22	1	—		6	1	8 (Note: Six appearances and one goal in UEFA Europa League, two appearances in UEFA Europa Conference League)	1	0	0	36	3
Ludogorets Razgrad	2023–24	First League	2	0	—		0	0	1 (Note: Appearance(s) in UEFA Champions League)	0	0	0	3	0
Ludogorets Razgrad	Total		24	1	—		6	1	9	1	0	0	39	3
Santos	2023	Série A	14	1	—		—		—		—		14	1
Santos	2024	Série B	1	0	7	0	—		—		—		8	0
Santos	Total		15	1	7	0	—		—		—		22	1
Fluminense (loan)	2024	Série A	10	0	—		1	0	1	0	—		12	0
Fluminense (loan)	2025	Série A	20	2	5	0	10	0	5	1	6 (Note: Appearance(s) in FIFA Club World Cup)	1	46	4
Fluminense (loan)	Total		30	2	5	0	11	0	6	1	6	1	58	4
Career total			142	8	57	6	36	2	33	2	14	1	282	19

== Honours ==
São Caetano

- Campeonato Paulista Série A2: 2017

Fluminense

- Campeonato Carioca: 2022

Ludogorets Razgrad

- Bulgarian First League: 2022–23
- Bulgarian Cup: 2022–23
