= Kevin Serna =

Colombian footballer (born 1997)

Personal information
- Full name: Kevin Steven Serna Jaramillo
- Date of birth: 17 December 1997 (age 28)
- Place of birth: Popayán, Colombia
- Height: 1.82 m (6 ft 0 in)
- Position: Forward

Team information
- Current team: Fluminense
- Number: 90

Youth career
- Deportes Tolima
- Porto

Senior career*
Years	Team	Apps	(Gls)
2019–2020	Sportivo Luqueño	20	(1)
2021	Los Chankas	22	(10)
2022–2023	ADT	70	(15)
2024	Alianza Lima	17	(1)
2024–	Fluminense	102	(20)

International career^{‡}
2025–	Colombia	2	(0)
- * Club domestic league appearances and goals as of 23:06, 14 November 2026 (UTC) ‡ National team caps and goals as of 23:16, 14 October 2025 (UTC)

Kevin Steven Serna Jaramillo (born 17 December 1997) is a Colombian footballer who plays as a forward for Campeonato Brasileiro Série A club Fluminense and the Colombia national team.

He began his professional career with Sportivo Luqueño in the Paraguayan Primera División before playing in Peru for Los Chankas, ADT and Alianza Lima, the latter two in the Peruvian Primera División. In July 2024 he signed for Fluminense, where he made over 100 appearances.

Serna made his international debut for Colombia in 2025. He had previously obtained Peruvian nationality in order to represent their national team, but was not resident in the country long enough to be permitted by FIFA.

== Club career ==
=== Early career ===
Born in Popayán in Cauca Department, Serna began his career in the youth ranks of Deportes Tolima. He went to Portugal to trial at Porto, signing a contract to play in their youth teams.

In early 2019, Serna began his senior career at Sportivo Luqueño in the Paraguayan Primera División. He debuted on 16 April as a 74th-minute substitute for Hernán Rivero in a 2–0 loss away to Club Olimpia. In his next game on 3 November, he scored the only goal of a home win against the same opponents; his team were bottom of the table and their opponents at the top.

=== Peru ===
In 2021, Serna joined Club Cultural Santa Rosa, later renamed Los Chankas, in the Peruvian Segunda División. His ten goals in 22 games contributed to a promotion to the Peruvian Primera División. He played the next season in the top flight at ADT, scoring 15 goals over two seasons. On 21 August 2022 he scored a late equaliser in a 1–1 home draw with Universitario and roughly a year later he assisted the first goal and scored the second in a 2–0 win over the same opponents.

At the end of October 2023, Serna signed for Alianza Lima. He scored his first goal for the club and first in continental competition on 3 April 2024, opening a 1–1 home draw with reigning champions Fluminense in the first group game of the Copa Libertadores.

=== Fluminense ===
On 22 July 2024, Serna signed for Fluminense until the end of 2027, paying US$1.8 million to obtain 70% of his economic rights. He made his debut in the Campeonato Brasileiro Série A two days later, as a half-time substitute for Marquinhos and assisted the only goal by compatriot Jhon Arias in a home win over Palmeiras. On 24 August, he scored his first goal to open a 2–0 win away to Atlético Mineiro.

Serna played as Fluminense finished runners-up in the 2025 Campeonato Carioca, losing the final to rivals Flamengo. He scored once on 23 February, as a substitute in a 3–2 home win over Bangu.

In the 2026 Campeonato Carioca, Serna was Fluminense's top scorer with five goals from eight games as they lost the final to Flamengo again, on penalties after a goalless draw. The overall top scorer award went to the opposition's Pedro and Bangu's Patryck Ferreira, with six. The final was also his 100th match for the club.

== International career ==
In December 2023, Serna said he was in the process of acquiring Peruvian nationality to play on the Peru national football team. The following month, his naturalisation was completed as he met the requirement of three years' residence, though he would not be able to play for the team for two more years due to FIFA's minimum of five years' residence.

At the start of October 2025, Serna was called up for the first time to the Colombia national team, ahead of friendlies against Mexico and Canada. He made his debut on 11 October as a starter in a 4–0 win over Mexico; though he did not score or assist, his performance was praised in Spanish-language media.

== Career statistics ==
=== Club ===
As of match played 15 December 2025

Club	Season	League			State league (Note: Includes Campeonato Carioca)		National cup (Note: Includes Copa Bicentenario, Copa do Brasil)		Continental		Other		Total	
Club	Season	Division	Apps	Goals	Apps	Goals	Apps	Goals	Apps	Goals	Apps	Goals	Apps	Goals
Sportivo Luqueño	2019	Paraguayan Primera División	4	1	—		—		—		—		4	1
Sportivo Luqueño	2020	Paraguayan Primera División	16	0	—		—		—		—		16	0
Sportivo Luqueño	Total		20	1	—		—		—		—		20	1
Los Chankas	2021	Liga 2	22	11	—		2	0	—		—		24	11
ADT	2022	Liga 1	34	8	—		—		—		—		34	8
ADT	2023	Liga 1	36	6	—		—		—		—		36	6
ADT	Total		70	14	—		—		—		—		70	14
Alianza Lima	2024	Liga 1	17	1	—		—		6 (Note: Appearances in Copa Libertadores)	2	—		23	3
Fluminense	2024	Série A	16	3	—		2	0	3	0	—		21	3
Fluminense	2025	Série A	33	7	12	1	10	2	10 (Note: Appearances in Copa Sudamericana)	3	2 (Note: Appearances in FIFA Club World Cup)	0	67	13
Fluminense	Total		49	10	12	1	10	2	19	3	2	0	84	16
Career total			178	37	12	1	14	2	19	5	2	0	223	46

=== International ===
As of match played 14 October 2025

Appearances and goals by national team and year
National team	Year	Apps	Goals
Colombia	2025	2	0
Total		2	0
