= Germán Cano =

Argentine footballer (born 1988)

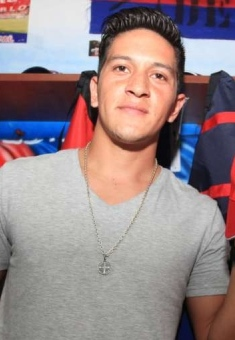
- Cano in 2012

Personal information
- Full name: Germán Ezequiel Cano Recalde
- Date of birth: 2 January 1988 (age 38)
- Place of birth: Lomas de Zamora, Argentina
- Height: 1.77 m (5 ft 10 in)
- Position: Striker

Team information
- Current team: Fluminense
- Number: 14

Youth career
- –2007: Lanús

Senior career*
Years	Team	Apps	(Gls)
2007–2012	Lanús	17	(2)
2009–2010	→ Chacarita Juniors (loan)	18	(1)
2011	→ Colón (loan)	5	(0)
2011	→ Deportivo Pereira (loan)	18	(9)
2012	→ Nacional Asuncion (loan)	12	(2)
2012–2015	Independiente Medellín	87	(51)
2015–2019	Pachuca	25	(4)
2016–2017	→ León (loan)	43	(11)
2018	→ Independiente Medellín (loan)	47	(32)
2019–2020	Independiente Medellín	47	(41)
2020–2022	Vasco da Gama	86	(38)
2022–	Fluminense	180	(78)
- * Club domestic league appearances and goals as of 1 October 2026

Germán Ezequiel Cano Recalde (born 2 January 1988) is an Argentine professional footballer who plays as a striker for Campeonato Brasileiro Série A club Fluminense.

== Career ==
=== Lanús and loans ===
Born in Lomas de Zamora, Cano was a Lanús youth graduate. He made his first team debut on 13 February 2008, coming on as a late substitute for Lautaro Acosta in a 3–1 Copa Libertadores home win against Danubio.

Cano made his Primera División debut on 17 February 2008, starting in a 1–0 away loss against Huracán. On 29 March, he scored his first professional goal by netting his team's only in a 3–1 loss at San Lorenzo, and finished his first senior season with two goals in 11 appearances.

On 21 August 2009, Cano was loaned to newly promoted side Chacarita Juniors, for one year. After featuring sparingly but suffering relegation he returned to Lanús, but after being rarely used by the latter, he was loaned out to Colón on 30 December 2010.

On 26 July 2011, Cano moved abroad for the first time in his career, joining Categoría Primera A side Deportivo Pereira on loan until December. The following 31 of January, he moved to Paraguay's Nacional also in a temporary deal.

=== Independiente Medellín ===
On 5 July 2012, Cano agreed to a permanent contract with Independiente Medellín. He was an immediate starter for the club, scoring nine goals in his first season and 15 goals in his second.

In the 2014 campaign, Cano scored 27 goals and was the top goalscorer of the Clausura tournament; highlights included a hat-trick in a 4–1 away routing of Millonarios on 11 October.

=== Pachuca and loans ===
On 21 January 2015, Cano switched teams and countries again after agreeing to a contract with Liga MX side Pachuca. He made his debut for the club on 1 February, starting in a 1–0 loss at Guadalajara, and scored his first goal on 4 March in a 1–1 CONCACAF Champions League away draw against Montreal Impact.

On 11 December 2015, after failing to feature in any league matches during the first half of the campaign due to a knee injury, Cano was loaned to fellow league team León. After being a regular starter, he returned to Pachuca and was mainly utilized as a substitute.

On 10 January 2018, Cano returned to Independiente Medellín on an initial six-month loan deal. On 19 May, he extended his link until the end of the year, and ended the season with 32 goals overall.

=== Vasco da Gama ===
On 27 December 2019, Germán Cano was announced as Cruzmaltino's first signing for 2020. In his second match for Vasco da Gama, Cano scored his first goal with the cruzmaltina shirt, in the last moments of a 1–0 win against Boavista in 2020 Campeonato Carioca.

On 6 December 2021, his departure from Vasco da Gama was announced. In all, Cano played in 101 games, scoring 43 goals and providing four assists. He is the club's second-highest non-Brazilian goalscorer in the 21st century.

=== Fluminense ===
On 27 December, Cano signed with Fluminense, with a contract until 2023.

On 26 May 2022, he scored his first hat-trick in the historic 10–1 away thrashing of Oriente Petrolero, a match valid for the last round of the Copa Sudamericana group stage.

At the end of the 2022 season, Cano was the top scorer of Brasileirão Série A in 2022 with 26 goals, while also being the top scorer of the 2022 Copa do Brasil with 5 goals. In all of the 2022 season he scored 44 goals.

On 4 October 2023, he scored the winning goal in the 87th minute in a 2–1 away victory over Internacional in the second leg of Copa Libertadores semi-finals, having also scored a brace in a 2–2 draw in the first leg, which qualified his team to the final. On 4 November, he scored the first goal for Fluminense in a 2–1 victory over Boca Juniors after extra time in the Copa Libertadores final. He finished the season with 40 goals scored.

Cano is frequently cited as one of the greatest players in Fluminense history due to his top-tier scoring ability and strong bond with the fans. His iconic "LL" celebration, which pays homage to his two children, Lorenzo and Leonella, has become a fan favorite.

== Career statistics ==
As of match played 15 December 2025

Appearances and goals by club, season and competition
Club	Season	League			State league (Note: Includes Campeonato Carioca)		National cup (Note: Includes Copa MX, Copa Colombia, Copa do Brasil)		Continental		Other		Total	
Club	Season	Division	Apps	Goals	Apps	Goals	Apps	Goals	Apps	Goals	Apps	Goals	Apps	Goals
Lanús	2007–08	Argentine Primera División	11	2	—		—		4 (Note: Appearances in Copa Libertadores)	0	—		15	2
Lanús	2008–09	Argentine Primera División	5	0	—		—		3	0	—		8	0
Lanús	2010–11	Argentine Primera División	1	0	—		—		—		—		1	0
Lanús	Total		17	2	—		—		7	0	—		24	2
Chacarita Juniors (loan)	2009–10	Argentine Primera División	18	1	—		—		—		—		18	1
Colón (loan)	2010–11	Argentine Primera División	5	0	—		—		—		—		5	0
Deportivo Pereira (loan)	2011	Categoría Primera A	18	9	—		—		—		—		18	9
Nacional (loan)	2012	Paraguayan Primera División	12	2	—		—		6	2	—		18	4
Independiente Medellín	2012	Categoría Primera A	14	9	—		—		—		—		14	9
Independiente Medellín	2013	Categoría Primera A	30	15	—		4	1	—		—		34	16
Independiente Medellín	2014	Categoría Primera A	43	27	—		3	2	—		—		46	29
Independiente Medellín	Total		87	51	—		7	3	—		—		94	54
Pachuca	2014–15	Liga MX	14	4	—		0	0	2 (Note: Appearances in CONCACAF Champions League)	1	—		16	5
Pachuca	2015–16	Liga MX	0	0	—		0	0	—		—		0	0
Pachuca	2017–18	Liga MX	11	0	—		5	3	—		1 (Note: Appearance in FIFA Club World Cup)	0	16	3
Pachuca	Total		25	4	—		5	3	2	1	1	0	33	8
León (loan)	2015–16	Liga MX	14	4	—		0	0	—		—		14	4
León (loan)	2016–17	Liga MX	29	7	—		5	2	—		—		34	9
León (loan)	Total		43	11	—		5	2	—		—		48	13
Independiente Medellín (loan)	2018	Categoría Primera A	47	32	—		2	1	1 (Note: Appearance(s) in Copa Sudamericana)	1	—		50	34
Independiente Medellín	2019	Categoría Primera A	37	34	—		8	6	2	1	—		47	41
Vasco da Gama	2020	Série A	34	14	8	6	6	2	3	2	—		51	24
Vasco da Gama	2021	Série B	36	11	8	7	6	1	—		—		50	19
Vasco da Gama	Total		70	25	16	13	12	3	3	2	—		101	43
Fluminense	2022	Série A	38	26	14	7	8	5	10 (Note: Four Appearances and three goals in Copa Libertadores, six appearances and three goals in Copa Sudamericana)	6	—		70	44
Fluminense	2023	Série A	30	10	13	16	4	1	12	13	2	0	61	40
Fluminense	2024	Série A	27	4	5	2	1	0	7	1	2 (Note: Appearances in Recopa Sudamericana)	0	42	7
Fluminense	2025	Série A	22	6	12	6	5	4	5	3	6	1	45	20
Fluminense	Total		117	46	44	31	18	10	34	23	10	1	223	111
Career total			531	213	60	44	57	28	55	30	11	1	681	313

== Honours ==
Lanús

- Argentine Primera División: 2007 Apertura

Independiente Medellín

- Copa Colombia: 2019

Vasco da Gama

- Taça Rio: 2021

Fluminense

- Copa Libertadores: 2023
- Recopa Sudamericana: 2024
- Campeonato Carioca: 2022, 2023
- Taça Guanabara: 2022, 2023

Individual

- Bola de Prata: 2022
- Campeonato Brasileiro Série A Team of the Year: 2022
- IFFHS Men's CONMEBOL Team: 2023
- Copa Libertadores Top scorer: 2023
- South American Footballer of the Year: 2023
- Campeonato Carioca top scorer: 2023, 2025

Records

- Independiente Medellín all-time top scorer: 129 goals
