= Isaac (footballer, born April 2004) =

Brazilian footballer (born 2004)

Personal information
- Full name: Isaac Rodrigues de Lima
- Date of birth: 24 April 2004 (age 22)
- Place of birth: Teresina, Brazil
- Height: 1.70 m (5 ft 7 in)
- Position: Forward

Team information
- Current team: Maccabi Netanya (on loan from Athletico Paranaense)

Youth career
- 2019–2020: River-PI
- 2022–2023: Fluminense

Senior career*
| Years | Team | Apps | (Gls) |
| 2023–2024 | Fluminense | 22 | (2) |
| 2025– | Athletico Paranaense | 21 | (0) |
| 2025– | → Maccabi Netanya (loan) | 0 | (0) |
- * Club domestic league appearances and goals as of 15 December 2025

Isaac Rodrigues de Lima (born 24 April 2004), simply known as Isaac, is a Brazilian footballer who plays as a forward for Maccabi Netanya, on loan from Athletico Paranaense.

== Club career ==
Born in Teresina, Isaac initially played football for a school in his local neighbourhood, before switching to futsal at the age of nine. At the age of fifteen, he joined River Atlético Clube in Piauí, where his brother, Jean Carlos, was playing. The following year, he was considering quitting the sport, before being offered a trial at top flight club Fluminense. Initially reluctant, his brother convinced him to attend, and he joined the club in February 2021, following a successful trial.

He made his debut for Fluminense on 18 January 2023 in a 1–0 Campeonato Carioca win over Nova Iguaçu, coming on as a substitute for Lima.

== Career statistics ==
=== Club ===
As of 20 March 2026.

Appearances and goals by club, season and competition
| Club | Season | League | | | State League (Note: Includes Campeonato Carioca, Campeonato Paranaense) | | Cup | | Continental | | Other | | Total | |
| Club | Season | Division | Apps | Goals | Apps | Goals | Apps | Goals | Apps | Goals | Apps | Goals | Apps | Goals |
|---|---|---|---|---|---|---|---|---|---|---|---|---|---|---|
| Fluminense | 2023 | Série A | 7 | 0 | 2 | 0 | 2 | 0 | 1 (Note: Appearance(s) in Copa Libertadores) | 0 | — | | 12 | 0 |
| Fluminense | 2024 | Série A | 7 | 0 | 6 | 2 | 2 | 0 | 1 | 0 | 0 | 0 | 16 | 2 |
| Fluminense | Total | | 14 | 0 | 8 | 2 | 4 | 0 | 2 | 0 | 0 | 0 | 28 | 2 |
| Athletico Paranaense | 2025 | Série B | 10 | 0 | 11 | 0 | 4 | 0 | — | | — | | 25 | 0 |
| Athletico Paranaense | 2026 | Série A | 0 | 0 | 0 | 0 | 0 | 0 | — | | — | | 0 | 0 |
| Athletico Paranaense | Total | | 10 | 0 | 11 | 0 | 4 | 0 | — | | — | | 25 | 0 |
| Career total | | | 24 | 0 | 19 | 2 | 8 | 0 | 2 | 0 | 0 | 0 | 53 | 2 |
