= 2024 Fluminense FC season =

Fluminense
2024 season
- Chairman: Mário Bittencourt
- Manager: Fernando Diniz; Mano Menezes
- Stadium: Maracanã
- Série A: 13th
- Campeonato Carioca: Semi-finals
- Copa do Brasil: Round of 16
- Copa Libertadores: Quarter-finals
- Recopa Sudamericana: Winners
- Top goalscorer: League: Jhon Arias (7); All: Jhon Arias (14)
- Average home league attendance: 32,621
| Home colours | Away colours |

The 2024 season is Fluminense's 123rd season in the club's history. Fluminense will compete in the Campeonato Carioca, Copa do Brasil, Série A, Copa Libertadores and Recopa Sudamericana.

== Squad ==
As of 8 June 2024

Note: Flags indicate national team as defined under FIFA eligibility rules; some limited exceptions apply. Players may hold more than one non-FIFA nationality.

| No. | Pos. | Nation | Player |
|---|---|---|---|
| 1 | GK | BRA | Fábio |
| 2 | DF | BRA | Samuel Xavier |
| 3 | DF | BRA | Thiago Silva |
| 4 | DF | BRA | Marlon (on loan from Shakhtar Donetsk) |
| 5 | MF | BRA | Alexsander |
| 6 | DF | BRA | Diogo Barbosa |
| 7 | MF | BRA | André |
| 8 | MF | BRA | Matheus Martinelli |
| 9 | FW | BRA | John Kennedy |
| 10 | MF | BRA | Ganso |
| 11 | FW | BRA | Keno |
| 12 | DF | BRA | Marcelo |
| 13 | DF | BRA | Felipe Andrade |
| 14 | FW | ARG | Germán Cano |
| 17 | FW | COL | Jan Lucumí (on loan from Boca Juniors de Cali) |
| 18 | FW | BRA | Lelê |
| 19 | FW | BRA | Kauã Elias |
| 20 | MF | BRA | Renato Augusto |

| No. | Pos. | Nation | Player |
|---|---|---|---|
| 21 | FW | COL | Jhon Arias |
| 22 | MF | BRA | Gabriel Pires |
| 23 | DF | BRA | Guga |
| 25 | DF | BRA | Antônio Carlos |
| 26 | DF | BRA | Manoel |
| 27 | GK | BRA | Felipe Alves |
| 28 | MF | BRA | Arthur |
| 29 | MF | BRA | Thiago Santos |
| 30 | MF | BRA | Felipe Melo (Captain) |
| 31 | DF | BRA | Calegari |
| 32 | FW | BRA | Isaac |
| 45 | MF | BRA | Lima |
| 46 | DF | BRA | Lucas Justen |
| 77 | FW | BRA | Marquinhos (on loan from Arsenal) |
| 80 | MF | URU | David Terans |
| 90 | FW | BRA | Douglas Costa |
| 98 | GK | BRA | Vitor Eudes |

=== Overall record ===
| Competition | First match | Last match | Starting round | Final position | Record | | | | | | | |
| Competition | First match | Last match | Starting round | Final position | Pld | W | D | L | GF | GA | GD | Win % |
|---|---|---|---|---|---|---|---|---|---|---|---|---|
| Série A | 13 April 2024 | 8 December 2024 | Matchday 1 | TBD | 38 | 12 | 10 | 16 | 33 | 39 | −6 | 31.58 |
| Campeonato Carioca | 18 January 2024 | 16 March 2024 | Taça Guanabara | Carioca Semi-Final | 13 | 6 | 4 | 3 | 17 | 13 | +4 | 46.15 |
| Copa do Brasil | 1 May 2024 | 7 August 2024 | Third round | Round of 16 | 4 | 2 | 1 | 1 | 8 | 5 | +3 | 50.00 |
| Copa Libertadores | 3 April 2024 | TBD | Group Stage | Quarter-Final | 10 | 6 | 2 | 2 | 13 | 10 | +3 | 60.00 |
| Recopa Sudamericana | 22 February 2024 | 29 February 2024 | Final | Winner | 2 | 1 | 0 | 1 | 2 | 1 | +1 | 50.00 |
| Total | | | | | 67 | 27 | 17 | 23 | 73 | 68 | +5 | 40.30 |

Last updated: 18 August 2024
Source: Competitions

== Competitions ==
=== Campeonato Carioca ===
==== Matches ====
| 18 January 2024 1 | Volta Redonda | 1–1 | Fluminense | Volta Redonda |
| 21:30 (UTC-3) | MV 90+2' | Report | Lelê 19' | Stadium: Estádio Raulino de Oliveira; Referee: Tarcizo Pinheiro Caetano |

| 21 January 2024 2 | Fluminense | 2–1 | Portuguesa | Rio de Janeiro |
| 16:00(UTC-3) | Lelê 5'; Isaac 31' | Report | Ronaldo 69' | Stadium: Estádio Moça Bonita; Referee: Felipe da Silva Gonçalves Paludo |

| 25 January 2024 3 | Audax Rio | 0–1 | Fluminense | Saquarema |
| 21:30 (UTC-3) | | Report | Lelê 33' | Stadium: Elcyr Resende de Mendonça; Referee: Alexandre Vargas Tavares de Jesus |

| 28 January 2024 4 | Fluminense | 3–0 | Nova Iguaçu | Rio de Janeiro |
| 18:10 (UTC-3) | Isaac 34'; Luan Freitas 53'; João Neto 90+2' | Report | | Stadium: Estádio Luso Brasileiro; Referee: Wagner do Nascimento Magalhães |

| 1 February 2024 5 | Fluminense | 4–1 | Bangu | Rio de Janeiro |
| 21:30 (UTC-3) | Keno 50'; Arias 60', 90'; Cano 75' | Report | Adsson 38' | Stadium: Estádio Luso Brasileiro; Referee: Julio Cesar de Oliveira |

| 4 February 2024 6 | Boavista | 2–2 | Fluminense | Saquarema |
| 16:00 (UTC-3) | Matheus Lucas 12', 18' | Report | Lelê 9'; João Neto 86' | Stadium: Elcyr Resende de Mendonça; Referee: Yuri Elino Ferreira da Cruz |

| 8 February 2024 7 | Fluminense | 1–0 | Sampaio Corrêa | Rio de Janeiro |
| 21:30 (UTC-3) | Cano 79' | Report | | Stadium: Maracanã; Referee: Rejane Caetano da Silva |

| 14 February 2024 8 | Fluminense | 0–0 | Vasco da Gama | Rio de Janeiro |
| 21:30 (UTC-3) | | Report | | Stadium: Maracanã; Referee: Bruno Mota Correia |

| 17 February 2024 9 | Madureira | 0–1 | Fluminense | Rio de Janeiro |
| 16:00 (UTC-3) | | Report | Lelê 61' | Stadium: Maracanã; Attendance: 16,160; Referee: Yuri Elino Ferreira da Cruz |

| 25 February 2024 10 | Flamengo | 2–0 | Fluminense | Rio de Janeiro |
| 16:00 (UTC-3) | Pedro 53'; Everton 78' | | | Stadium: Maracanã; Attendance: 55,401; Referee: Yuri Elino Ferreira da Cruz |

| 3 March 2024 11 | Fluminense | 2–4 | Botafogo | Rio de Janeiro |
| 16:00 (UTC-3) | Lelê 26'; John Kennedy 86' (pen.) | Report | Marlon Freitas 3', 90' (pen.); Raí 15'; Emerson Urso 90+13' | Stadium: Maracanã; Referee: Felipe da Silva Gonçalves Paludo |

==== Semi-finals ====
| 9 March 2024 | Fluminense | 0–2 | Flamengo | Rio de Janeiro |
| 21:00 (UTC-3) | | Report | Everton 45+2'; Pedro 90+4' | Stadium: Maracanã; Attendance: 52,169; Referee: Yuri Elino Ferreira da Cruz |

| 16 March 2024 | Flamengo | 0–0 | Fluminense | Rio de Janeiro |
| 21:00 (UTC-3) | | Report | | Stadium: Maracanã; Attendance: 56,261; Referee: Wagner do Nascimento Magalhães |

==== Record ====
| Final Position | Points | Matches | Wins | Draws | Losses | Goals For | Goals Away | Avg% |
|---|---|---|---|---|---|---|---|---|
| 3rd | 22 | 13 | 6 | 4 | 3 | 17 | 13 | 56% |

=== Recopa Sudamericana ===
| 22 February 2024 | LDU Quito (Ecuador) | 1–0 | (Brazil) Fluminense | Quito |
| 19:30 (UTC-5) | Arce 90+2' | | | Stadium: Estadio Rodrigo Paz Delgado; Attendance: 30,712; Referee: Andrés Rojas (Colombia) |

| 29 February 2024 | Fluminense (Brazil) | 2–0 | (Ecuador) LDU Quito | Rio de Janeiro |
| 21:30 (UTC-3) | Arias 76', 90' (pen.) | | | Stadium: Maracanã; Attendance: 61,217; Referee: Facundo Tello (Argentina) |

==== Record ====
| Final Position | Points | Matches | Wins | Draws | Losses | Goals For | Goals Away | Avg% |
|---|---|---|---|---|---|---|---|---|
| 1st | 3 | 2 | 1 | 0 | 1 | 2 | 1 | 50% |

=== Copa do Brasil ===
==== Third round ====
| 1 May 2024 | Sampaio Corrêa | 0–2 | Fluminense | Cariacica |
| 16:00 (UTC-3) | | Report | Lima 33'; Arias 86' (pen.) | Stadium: Kléber Andrade; Attendance: 10,465; Referee: Felipe Fernandes de Lima |

| 22 May 2024 | Fluminense | 2–0 | Sampaio Corrêa | Rio de Janeiro |
| 19:00 (UTC-3) | Arias 19'; John Kennedy 79' | Report | | Stadium: Maracanã; Attendance: 22,333; Referee: Edina Alves Batista |

==== Round of 16 ====
| 1 August 2024 | Juventude | 3–2 | Fluminense | Caxias do Sul |
| 19:00 (UTC-3) | Lucas Barbosa 48'; Rodrigo Sam 54'; Diego Gonçalves 73' | Report | Lima 2'; Thiago Santos 90+3' | Stadium: Alfredo Jaconi; Attendance: 9,087; Referee: Luiz Flavio de Oliveira |

| 7 August 2024 | Fluminense | 2–2 | Juventude | Rio de Janeiro |
| 21:30 (UTC-3) | Kauã Elias 90'; Keno 90+2' | Report | Lucas Barbosa 5'; Marcelinho 85' | Stadium: Maracanã; Attendance: 39,427; Referee: Raphael Claus |

==== Record ====
| Final Position | Points | Matches | Wins | Draws | Losses | Goals For | Goals Away | Avg% |
|---|---|---|---|---|---|---|---|---|
| 11th | 7 | 4 | 2 | 1 | 1 | 8 | 5 | 58% |

=== Copa Libertadores ===
==== Group stage ====
| 3 April 2024 1 | Alianza Lima (Peru) | 1–1 | (Brazil) Fluminense | Lima |
| 19:30 (UTC-5) | Serna 35' | Report | Marquinhos 72' | Stadium: Estadio Alejandro Villanueva; Attendance: 19,779; Referee: Andrés Matonte (Uruguay) |

| 9 April 2024 2 | Fluminense (Brazil) | 2–1 | (Chile) Colo-Colo | Rio de Janeiro |
| 21:00 (UTC-3) | Marquinhos 5'; Cano 52' | Report | Paiva 19' | Stadium: Maracanã; Attendance: 44,477; Referee: Jesús Valenzuela (Venezuela) |

| 25 April 2024 3 | Cerro Porteño (Paraguay) | 0–0 | (Brazil) Fluminense | Asunción |
| 18:00 (UTC-4) | | Report | | Stadium: Estadio General Pablo Rojas; Attendance: 26,365; Referee: Esteban Ostojich (Uruguay) |

| 9 May 2024 4 | Colo-Colo (Chile) | 0–1 | (Brazil) Fluminense | Santiago |
| 20:00 (UTC-4) | | Report | Manoel 74' | Stadium: Estadio Monumental David Arellano; Attendance: 41,285; Referee: Wilmar Roldán (Colombia) |

| 16 May 2024 5 | Fluminense (Brazil) | 2–1 | (Paraguay) Cerro Porteño | Rio de Janeiro |
| 19:00 (UTC-3) | Marcelo 14'; Ganso 74' | Report | Viera 19' | Stadium: Maracanã; Attendance: 42,232; Referee: Darío Herrera (Argentina) |

| 29 May 2024 6 | Fluminense (Brazil) | 3–2 | (Peru) Alianza Lima | Rio de Janeiro |
| 21:30 (UTC-3) | Keno 47'; Marcelo 52'; John Kennedy 81' | Report | Arregui 7'; Serna 50' | Stadium: Maracanã; Attendance: 38,404; Referee: Esteban Ostojich (Uruguay) |

==== Round of 16 ====
| 14 August 2024 | Grêmio (Brazil) | 2–1 | (Brazil) Fluminense | Curitiba |
| 19:00 (UTC-3) | Reinaldo 74', 77' (pen.) | Report | Lima 58' | Stadium: Estádio Couto Pereira; Attendance: 18,727; Referee: Darío Herrera (Argentina) |

| 20 August 2024 | Fluminense (Brazil) | 2–1 (4–2 p) | (Brazil) Grêmio | Rio de Janeiro |
| 19:00 (UTC-3) | Thiago Silva 14'; Arias 28' (pen.) | | Gustavo Nunes 76' | Stadium: Maracanã; Referee: Andrés Matonte (Uruguay) |
| | Penalties |
| | Ganso (penalty missed); Thiago Silva (penalty scored); John Kennedy (penalty scored); Lima (penalty scored); Arias (penalty scored) | | (penalty scored) Reinaldo; (penalty missed) Nathan; (penalty scored) Monsalve; (penalty missed) Cristaldo |

==== Quarter finals ====
| 18 September 2024 | Fluminense (Brazil) | 1–0 | (Brazil) Atlético Mineiro | Rio de Janeiro |
| 19:00 (UTC-3) | Lima 87' | Report | | Stadium: Maracanã; Attendance: 54,140; Referee: Facundo Tello (Argentina) |

| 25 September 2024 | Atlético Mineiro (Brazil) | 2–0 | (Brazil) Fluminense | Belo Horizonte |
| 19:00 (UTC-3) | Deyverson 50', 88' | Report | | Stadium: Arena MRV; Attendance: 43,659; Referee: Wilmar Roldán (Colombia) |

==== Record ====
| Final Position | Points | Matches | Wins | Draws | Losses | Goals For | Goals Away | Avg% |
|---|---|---|---|---|---|---|---|---|
| 6th | 20 | 10 | 6 | 2 | 2 | 13 | 10 | 66% |

=== Campeonato Brasileiro ===
==== League table ====
| Pos | Team | Pld | W | D | L | GF | GA | GD | Pts | Qualification or relegation |
|---|---|---|---|---|---|---|---|---|---|---|
| 11 | Vitória | 38 | 13 | 8 | 17 | 45 | 52 | −7 | 47 | Qualification for Copa Sudamericana group stage |
| 12 | Atlético Mineiro | 38 | 11 | 14 | 13 | 47 | 54 | −7 | 47 | Qualification for Copa Sudamericana group stage |
| 13 | Fluminense | 38 | 12 | 10 | 16 | 33 | 39 | −6 | 46 | Qualification for Copa Sudamericana group stage |
| 14 | Grêmio | 38 | 12 | 9 | 17 | 44 | 50 | −6 | 45 | Qualification for Copa Sudamericana group stage |
| 15 | Juventude | 38 | 11 | 12 | 15 | 48 | 59 | −11 | 45 | |

Source: CBF
Rules for classification: 1) points; 2) wins; 3) goal difference; 4) goals scored; 5) head-to-head results (only between two teams); 6) fewest red cards; 7) fewest yellow cards; 8) drawing of lots.

==== Matches ====
| 13 April 2024 1 | Fluminense | 2–2 | Red Bull Bragantino | Rio de Janeiro |
| 21:00 (UTC-3) | Lima 45', 67' | Report | Eduardo Sasha 47'; Thiago Borbas 52' | Stadium: Maracanã; Attendance: 17,645; Referee: Maguielson Lima Barbosa |

| 16 April 2024 2 | Bahia | 2–1 | Fluminense | Salvador |
| 21:30 (UTC-3) | Caio Alexandre 34'; Cauly 61' | Report | Cano 3' | Stadium: Arena Fonte Nova; Attendance: 22,893; Referee: João Vitor Gobi |

| 20 April 2024 3 | Fluminense | 2–1 | Vasco da Gama | Rio de Janeiro |
| 16:00 (UTC-3) | Ganso 10'; Martinelli 53' | Report | Vegetti 55' | Stadium: Maracanã; Attendance: 25,842; Referee: Wilton Pereira Sampaio |

| 28 April 2024 4 | Corinthians | 3–0 | Fluminense | São Paulo |
| 16:00 (UTC-3) | Wesley 40', 45+2'; Cacá 47' | Report | | Stadium: Neo Química Arena; Attendance: 42,119; Referee: Ramon Abatti Abel |

| 4 May 2024 5 | Fluminense | 2–2 | Atlético Mineiro | Cariacica |
| 16:00 (UTC-3) | Cano 4'; Renato Augusto 61' | Report | Vargas 73', 79' | Stadium: Estádio Kléber Andrade; Attendance: 14,202; Referee: Raphael Claus |

| 13 May 2024 6 | São Paulo | 2–1 | Fluminense | São Paulo |
| 20:00 (UTC-3) | Bobadilla 32'; Arboleda 84' | Report | Igor Vinícius 28' (o.g.) | Stadium: Morumbi; Attendance: 39,515; Referee: Anderson Daronco |

| 1 June 2024 7 | Fluminense | 1–1 | Juventude | Rio de Janeiro |
| 18:30 (UTC-3) | Marcelo 41' | Report | Jadson 68' | Stadium: Maracanã; Attendance: 21,037; Referee: Matheus Delgado Candançan |

| 11 June 2024 8 | Botafogo | 1–0 | Fluminense | Rio de Janeiro |
| 20:00 (UTC-3) | Bastos 65' | Report | | Stadium: Nilton Santos; Attendance: 27,239; Referee: Flávio Rodrigues de Souza |

| 15 June 2024 9 | Fluminense | 1–2 | Atlético Goianiense | Rio de Janeiro |
| 21:00 (UTC-3) | Ganso 41' | Report | Luiz Fernando 70'; Zuleta 90+4' | Stadium: Maracanã; Attendance: 13,446; Referee: Gustavo Ervino Bauermann |

| 19 June 2024 10 | Cruzeiro | 2–0 | Fluminense | Belo Horizonte |
| 21:30 (UTC-3) | William 40', 90+2' | Report | | Stadium: Mineirão; Attendance: 28,812; Referee: Matheus Delgado Candançan |

| 23 June 2024 11 | Fluminense | 0–1 | Flamengo | Rio de Janeiro |
| 16:00 (UTC-3) | | Report | Pedro 86' (pen.) | Stadium: Maracanã; Attendance: 57,098; Referee: Rafael Rodrigo Klein |

| 27 June 2024 13 | Fluminense | 0–1 | Vitória | Rio de Janeiro |
| 19:00 (UTC-3) | | Report | Janderson 89' | Stadium: Maracanã; Attendance: 24,269; Referee: Flávio Rodrigues de Souza |

| 30 June 2024 14 | Grêmio | 1–0 | Fluminense | Caxias do Sul |
| 16:00 (UTC-3) | Gustavo Nunes 60' | Report | | Stadium: Estádio Centenário; Attendance: 8,549; Referee: Paulo Cesar Zanovelli da Silva |

| 4 July 2024 12* | Fluminense | 1–1 | Internacional | Rio de Janeiro |
| 20:00 (UTC-3) | Ganso 45+3' | Report | Igor Gomes 40' | Stadium: Maracanã; Attendance: 40,337; Referee: Felipe Fernandes de Lima |

| 7 July 2024 15 | Fortaleza | 1–0 | Fluminense | Fortaleza |
| 16:00 (UTC-3) | Lucero 56' | Report | | Stadium: Castelão; Attendance: 34,831; Referee: Davi de Oliveira Lacerda |

| 11 July 2024 16 | Criciúma | 1–1 | Fluminense | Criciúma |
| 20:00 (UTC-3) | Matheusinho 53' | Report | Kauã Elias 89' | Stadium: Heriberto Hülse; Attendance: 11,486; Referee: Anderson Daronco |

| 21 July 2024 18 | Cuiabá | 0–1 | Fluminense | Cuiabá |
| 20:00 (UTC-4) | | Report | Kauã Elias 73' | Stadium: Arena Pantanal; Attendance: 13,231; Referee: Anderson Daronco |

| 24 July 2024 19 | Fluminense | 1–0 | Palmeiras | Rio de Janeiro |
| 21:30 (UTC-3) | Arias 87' | Report | | Stadium: Maracanã; Attendance: 51,375; Referee: Wilton Pereira Sampaio |

| 28 July 2024 20 | Red Bull Bragantino | 0–1 | Fluminense | Bragança Paulista |
| 11:00 (UTC-3) | | Report | Kauã Elias 44' | Stadium: Nabi Abi Chedid; Attendance: 7,304; Referee: Lucas Paulo Torezin |

| 4 August 2024 21 | Fluminense | 1–0 | Bahia | Rio de Janeiro |
| 16:00 (UTC-3) | Kauã Elias 45' | Report | | Stadium: Maracanã; Attendance: 50,262; Referee: Davi Lacerda |

| 10 August 2024 22 | Vasco da Gama | 2–0 | Fluminense | Rio de Janeiro |
| 21:30 (UTC-3) | Vegetti 23'; Victor Luis 65' | Report | | Stadium: São Januário; Attendance: 20,013; Referee: Anderson Daronco |

| 17 August 2024 23 | Fluminense | 0–0 | Corinthians | Rio de Janeiro |
| 21:00 (UTC-3) | | Report | | Stadium: Maracanã; Attendance: 30,475; Referee: Bráulio da Silva Machado |

| 24 August 2024 24 | Atlético Mineiro | 0–2 | Fluminense | Belo Horizonte |
| 21:00 (UTC-3) | | Report | Serna 23'; Arias 59' | Stadium: Mineirão; Attendance: 32,068; Referee: Flávio Rodrigues De Souza |

| 1 September 2024 25 | Fluminense | 2–0 | São Paulo | Rio de Janeiro |
| 18:30 (UTC-3) | Kauã Elias 31'; Keno 90+1' | Report | | Stadium: Maracanã; Attendance: 45,759; Referee: Paulo César Zanovelli |

| 15 September 2024 26 | Juventude | 2–1 | Fluminense | Caxias do Sul |
| 16:00 (UTC-3) | Ronaldo 80'; Marcelinho 82' | Report | Arias 26' | Stadium: Alfredo Jaconi; Attendance: Flávio Rodrigues de Souza; Referee: 6,232 |

| 21 September 2024 27 | Fluminense | 0–1 | Botafogo | Rio de Janeiro |
| 18:30 (UTC-3) | | Report | Luiz Henrique 90+5' | Stadium: Maracanã; Attendance: 29,710; Referee: Wilton Pereira Sampaio |

| 29 September 2024 28 | Atlético Goianiense | 1–0 | Fluminense | Goiânia |
| 16:00 (UTC-3) | Janderson 84' | Report | | Stadium: Antônio Accioly; Attendance: 7,871; Referee: Ramon Abatti Abel |

| 3 October 2024 29 | Fluminense | 1–0 | Cruzeiro | Rio de Janeiro |
| 21:30 (UTC-3) | Arias 55' | Report | | Stadium: Maracanã; Referee: Gustavo Ervino Bauermann |

| 17 October 2024 30 | Flamengo | 0–2 | Fluminense | Rio de Janeiro |
| 20:00 (UTC-3) | | Report | Lima 50'; Arias 60' | Stadium: Maracanã; Attendance: 58,117; Referee: Raphael Claus |

| 22 October 2024 17* | Fluminense | 1–0 | Athletico Paranaense | Rio de Janeiro |
| 19:30 (UTC-3) | Cano 81' | Report | | Stadium: Maracanã; Attendance: 39,465; Referee: Bráulio Da Silva Machado |

| 26 October 2024 31 | Vitória | 2–1 | Fluminense | Salvador |
| 16:30 (UTC-3) | Neris 45+1'; Alerrandro 90+1' (pen.) | Report | Lucas Arcanjo 61' (o.g.) | Stadium: Barradão; Attendance: 29,497; Referee: Flávio Rodrigues de Souza |

| 1 November 2024 32 | Fluminense | 2–2 | Grêmio | Rio de Janeiro |
| 21:00 (UTC-3) | Arias 43'; Kauã Elias 66' | Report | Braithwaite 26'; Reinaldo 90+9' (pen.) | Stadium: Maracanã; Attendance: 35,278; Referee: Matheus Delgado Candançan |

| 13 November 2024 33 | Internacional | 2–0 | Fluminense | Porto Alegre |
| 18:00 (UTC-3) | Borré 52'; Henrique 90+5' | Report | | Stadium: Beira-Rio; Attendance: 37,550; Referee: Luiz Flavio de Oliveira |

| 20 November 2024 34 | Fluminense | 2–2 | Fortaleza | Rio de Janeiro |
| 20:30 (UTC-3) | Lima 11'; Cano 85' | Report | Moisés 19'; Marinho 43' | Stadium: Maracanã; Attendance: 37,969; Referee: Raphael Claus |

| 23 November 2024 35 | Fluminense | 0–0 | Criciúma | Rio de Janeiro |
| 18:00 (UTC-3) | | Report | | Stadium: Maracanã; Attendance: 41,240; Referee: Luiz Flávio de Oliveira |

| 30 November 2024 36 | Athletico Paranaense | 1–1 | Fluminense | Curitiba |
| 17:30 (UTC-3) | Belezi 2' | Report | Arias 65'; Ganso (red card) 90+5' | Stadium: Arena da Baixada; Referee: Raphael Claus |

| 4 December 2024 37 | Fluminense | 1–0 | Cuiabá | Rio de Janeiro |
| 19:00 (UTC-3) | Serna 59'; Arias (penalty missed) 29' | Report | | Stadium: Maracanã; Attendance: 59,730; Referee: Rafael Rodrigo Klein |

| 8 December 2024 38 | Palmeiras | 0–1 | Fluminense | São Paulo |
| 15:00 (UTC-3) | | Report | Serna 37' | Stadium: Allianz Parque; Referee: Ramon Abatti |

(*) Postponed matches due to changes in competition schedules
