= Divine Lunga =

Zimbabwean footballer (born 1995)

Personal information
- Date of birth: 28 May 1995 (age 31)
- Place of birth: Bulawayo, Zimbabwe
- Height: 1.79 m (5 ft 10 in)
- Position: Left-back

Team information
- Current team: Mamelodi Sundowns
- Number: 29

Youth career
- 2004–2012: Ajax Hotspurs Mpopoma
- 2012–2015: Chicken Inn

Senior career*
Years	Team	Apps	(Gls)
2015–2018	Chicken Inn		
2018–2021	Golden Arrows	73	(1)
2021–	Mamelodi Sundowns	25	(0)
2022–2023	→ Golden Arrows (loan)	28	(1)

International career^{‡}
2015–	Zimbabwe	18	(0)
- * Club domestic league appearances and goals as of 3 January 2026 ‡ National team caps and goals as of 13 November 2022

Divine Lunga was born in Bulawayo on 28 May 1995 is a Zimbabwean footballer who plays as a defender for Mamelodi Sundowns and the Zimbabwe national football team.

== Club career ==
=== Early career ===
Lunga began playing football at the age of 9, joining Ajax Hotspurs of Mpopoma. He moved to Chicken Inn in 2012, playing for the Under-18 and B teams before moving to the first team.

=== Golden Arrows ===
In July 2018, Lunga joined South African club Lamontville Golden Arrows. He made his league debut for the club on 5 August 2018 in a 2–0 away victory over Maritzburg United. He scored his first competitive goal for the club on 14 April 2019 in a 1–1 draw with AmaZulu F.C. His goal, assisted by Richard Matloga, was scored in the 18th minute and made the score 1-1. Following his performances in the 2019 Africa Cup of Nations, there was reported interest in Lunga from several French and Belgian clubs, including K.R.C. Genk.

=== Mamelodi Sundows ===
Lunga joined Mamelodi Sundowns in 2021. He was part of the Sundowns team that competed in the FIFA Club World Cup in the United States in 2025.

== International career ==
Lunga made his senior international debut on 21 June 2015 in a 2–0 victory over Comoros during 2016 African Nations Championship qualification. He was included in Zimbabwe's 2019 Africa Cup of Nations squad, playing in their matches against Egypt and Uganda.

On 11 December 2025, Lunga was called up to the Zimbabwe squad for the 2025 Africa Cup of Nations.

== Honours ==
Mamelodi Sundowns

- CAF Champions League: 2025–26
