= Keanu Cupido =

South African soccer player

Personal information
- Full name: Keanu Gregory Cupido
- Date of birth: 15 January 1998 (age 28)
- Place of birth: Soweto, South Africa
- Height: 1.81 m (5 ft 11 in)
- Position: Defender

Team information
- Current team: Mamelodi Sundowns
- Number: 48

Youth career
- –2016: Diambars
- 2016–2017: Bidvest Wits

Senior career*
Years	Team	Apps	(Gls)
2017–2018	Ajaccio B	18	(0)
2018–2025	Cape Town City	116	(1)
2025–	Mamelodi Sundowns	12	(0)

International career^{‡}
2015	South Africa U17		
2019	South Africa	2	(0)
- * Club domestic league appearances and goals as of 3 January 2026 ‡ National team caps and goals as of 16 March 2024

Keanu Gregory Cupido (born 15 January 1998) is a South African soccer player who plays as a defender for Mamelodi Sundowns in the Betway Premiership.

== Career ==
=== International ===
Cupido made his senior international debut on 4 June 2019, playing the entirety of South Africa's victory 4-2 via penalties over Uganda at the 2019 COSAFA Cup. He was again selected for the 2024 COSAFA Cup.

== Career statistics ==
=== International ===
As of matches played 7 June 2019.

National team	Year	Apps	Goals
South Africa	2019	2	0
Total		2	0

== Honours ==
Mamelodi Sundowns

- CAF Champions League: 2025–26
