= Paulo Baya =

Brazilian footballer (born 1999)

Personal information
- Full name: Paulo Henrique Silva Ribeiro
- Date of birth: 26 July 1999 (age 27)
- Place of birth: Bom Jesus do Tocantins, Pará, Brazil
- Height: 1.86 m (6 ft 1 in)
- Position: Forward

Team information
- Current team: Fortaleza (on loan from Primavera)
- Number: 77

Youth career
- –2020: Cascavel

Senior career*
Years	Team	Apps	(Gls)
2017	Cascavel		
2021	→ Ventforet Kofu (loan)	6	(0)
2022	→ Avaí (loan)	8	(0)
2022	→ Brusque (loan)	18	(0)
2023–	Primavera	18	(4)
2023	→ Ponte Preta (loan)	24	(2)
2024	→ Goiás (loan)	46	(18)
2025	→ Fluminense (loan)	9	(1)
2025	→ Ceará (loan)	16	(0)
2026–	→ Fortaleza (loan)	0	(0)
- * Club domestic league appearances and goals as of 8 March 2026

Paulo Henrique Silva Ribeiro (born 26 July 1999), commonly known as Paulo Baya, is a Brazilian footballer who plays as a forward for Fortaleza on loan from Primavera.

== Career statistics ==
=== Club ===
As of 23 May 2024.

Club	Season	League			State League		Cup		Other		Total	
Club	Season	Division	Apps	Goals	Apps	Goals	Apps	Goals	Apps	Goals	Apps	Goals
Raça SB	2017	Goianão 3rd Division	0	0	4 (Note: Appearances in the Campeonato Goiano)	0	0	0	0	0	4	0
Cascavel	2020	Série D	16	7	11 (Note: Appearances in the Campeonato Paranaense)	3	0	0	0	0	27	10
Ventforet Kofu (loan)	2021	J2 League	6	0	–		1	1	0	0	7	1
Avaí	2022	Série A	0	0	8 (Note: Appearances in the Campeonato Paranaense)	0	0	0	0	0	8	0
Brusque	2022	Série B	18	0	–		0	0	0	0	18	0
Primavera	2023	CP2	–		11	3	0	0	0	0	11	3
Ponte Preta	2023	Série B	24	2	–		0	0	0	0	24	2
Goiás	2024	Série B	5	2	13	10	1	0	3	1	22	13
Career total			69	11	43	16	2	1	3	1	117	29
