= Jhon Arias (footballer) =

Colombian footballer (born 1997)

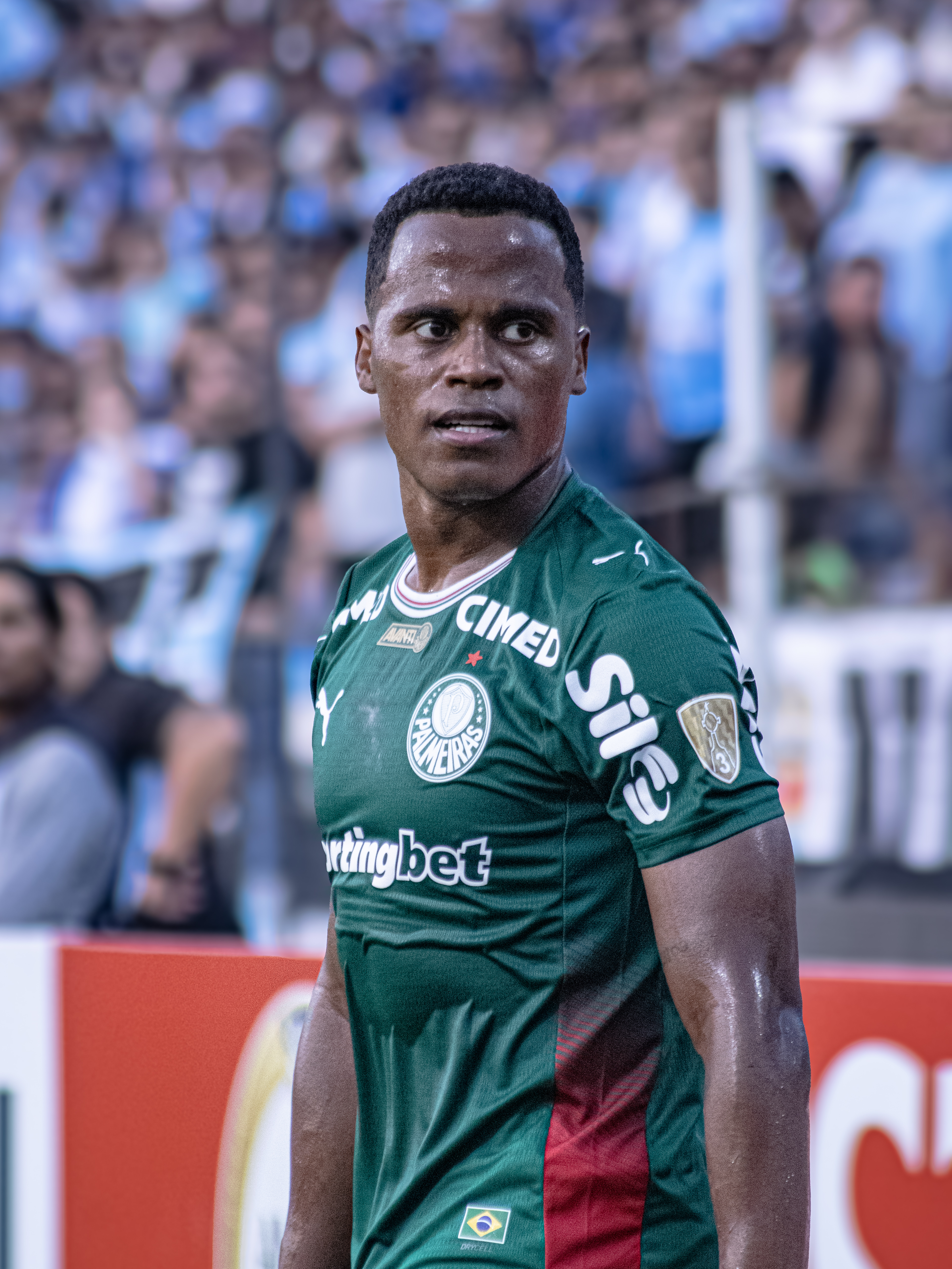
- Arias with Palmeiras in 2026

Personal information
- Full name: Jhon Adolfo Arias Andrade
- Date of birth: 21 September 1997 (age 29)
- Place of birth: Quibdó, Colombia
- Height: 1.70 m (5 ft 7 in)
- Positions: Wide midfielder; attacking midfielder

Team information
- Current team: Palmeiras
- Number: 11

Youth career
- 2016: Dorados
- 2016–2017: Tijuana
- 2017: Patriotas

Senior career*
Years	Team	Apps	(Gls)
2018–2019	Patriotas	36	(4)
2018	→ Llaneros (loan)	31	(5)
2020	América de Cali	21	(1)
2021	Santa Fe	22	(3)
2021–2025	Fluminense	164	(32)
2025–2026	Wolverhampton Wanderers	23	(1)
2026–	Palmeiras	32	(6)

International career^{‡}
2022–	Colombia	46	(7)
Medal record
Men's football
Representing Colombia
Copa América
Runner-up	2024 United States
- * Club domestic league appearances and goals as of 23:51, 5 November 2026 (UTC) ‡ National team caps and goals as of 6 October 2026

Jhon Adolfo Arias Andrade (born 21 September 1997) is a Colombian professional footballer who plays as wide midfielder or attacking midfielder for Campeonato Brasileiro Série A club Palmeiras and the Colombia national team.

After beginning his career in Colombia with Patriotas, he moved to América de Cali, where he won the Categoría Primera A in 2020. He later joined Santa Fe before transferring to Brazil with Fluminense. In 2022, he won the Campeonato Carioca, and in 2023 he added another Campeonato Carioca and the Copa Libertadores, while being named to the Campeonato Carioca Team of the Year, the Copa Libertadores Team of the Tournament, the Campeonato Brasileiro Série A Team of the Year, and the South American Team of the Year. In 2024, he won the Recopa Sudamericana, and in 2025 he was named to the FIFA Club World Cup Team of the Tournament. Later that year, he transferred to Wolverhampton Wanderers, signing a four-year contract with an option for an additional year.

Arias made his senior international debut for Colombia in 2022, and was part of the squad that finished runners-up at the 2024 Copa América.

== Club career ==
=== Early career ===
Born in Quibdó, Arias represented Mexican sides Dorados de Sinaloa and Tijuana as a youth. He returned to his home country in 2017 and signed for Patriotas Boyacá, before moving out on loan to Llaneros for the 2018 season.

After making his senior debut with Llaneros in the 2018 Categoría Primera B, Arias returned to Patriotas for the 2019 Categoría Primera A. Regularly used, he scored four goals in 38 appearances overall.

=== América de Cali ===
On 10 December 2019, Arias signed a contract with América de Cali. He was unable to establish himself as a regular starter, scoring once in 29 matches.

=== Independiente Santa Fe ===
On 7 January 2021, Arias joined Independiente Santa Fe. He quickly became a first-choice at his new side, and despite finishing winless in the group stage of 2021 Copa Libertadores, his performances attracted the interest of foreign clubs.

=== Fluminense ===
On 18 August 2021, Arias moved abroad for the first time in his career, after agreeing to a four-year contract with Campeonato Brasileiro Série A side Fluminense. He made his debut abroad twelve days later, starting in a 2–0 home win over Bahia, and scored his first goal on 2 September, in a 1–1 home draw against Juventude.

After a first season mainly a backup, Arias subsequently became a starter, and was a part of the squad that won the club's first ever Copa Libertadores in 2023, by beating Boca Juniors 2–1 in the final. He was also nominated for the South American Footballer of the Year in that year, but finished fourth.

Arias' performances at the 2025 FIFA Club World Cup earned him a nomination to the team of the tournament, having scored one goal, provided one assist and helped his side reach the semi-finals. His final appearance for Fluminense came in the team's first match following the World Cup, a 2–0 loss to Cruzeiro at the Maracanã.

=== Wolverhampton Wanderers ===
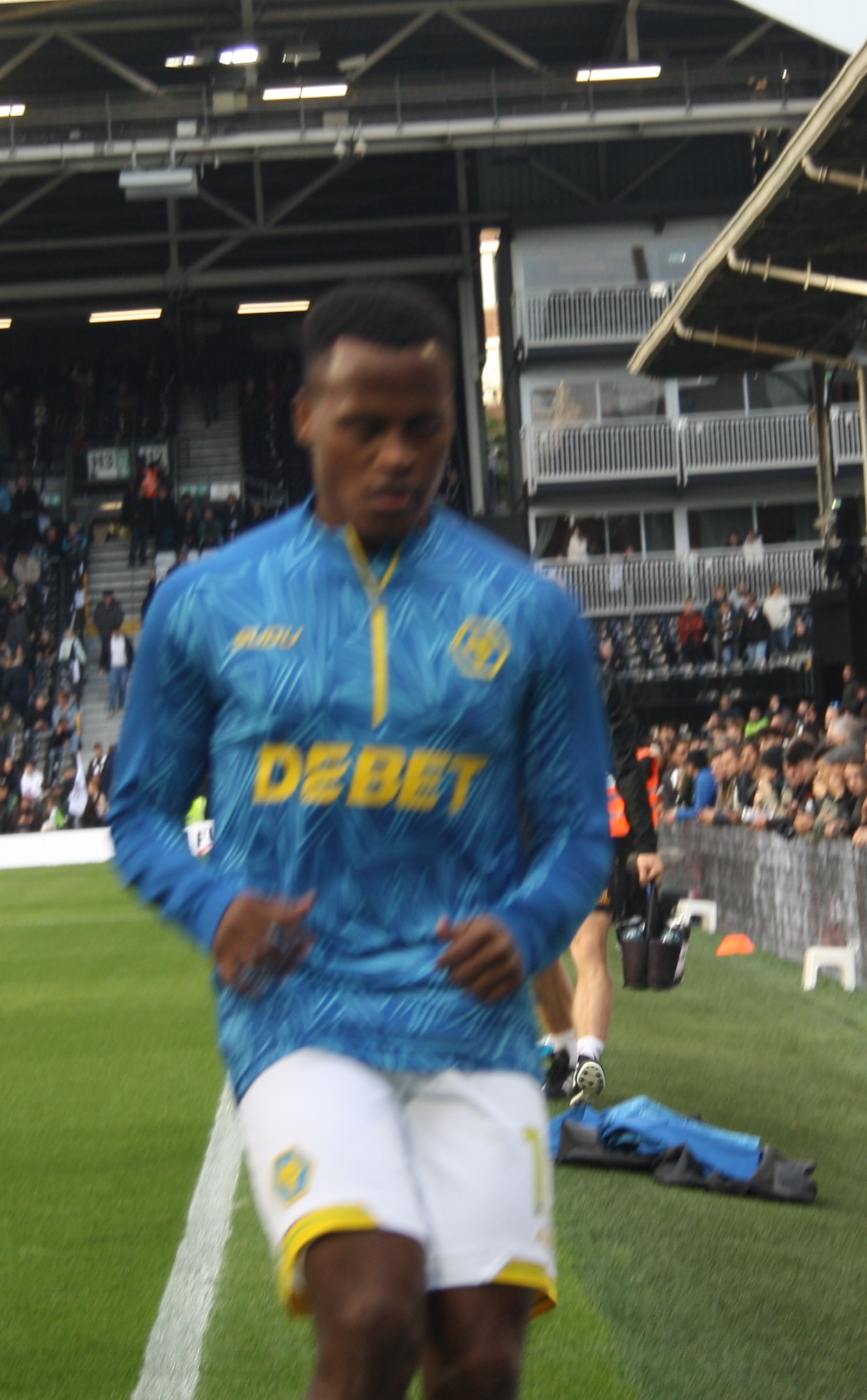
Arias warming up before a match for Wolverhampton Wanderers in 2025

On 18 July 2025, Fluminense announced an agreement for the transfer of Arias to Premier League club Wolverhampton Wanderers. The deal was completed on 24 July on a four-year contract with the option of an additional year's extension.

=== Palmeiras ===
On 7 February 2026, Arias returned to Brazil, this time joining Palmeiras on a three-year contract for €25 million paid over four years in instalments.

== International career ==
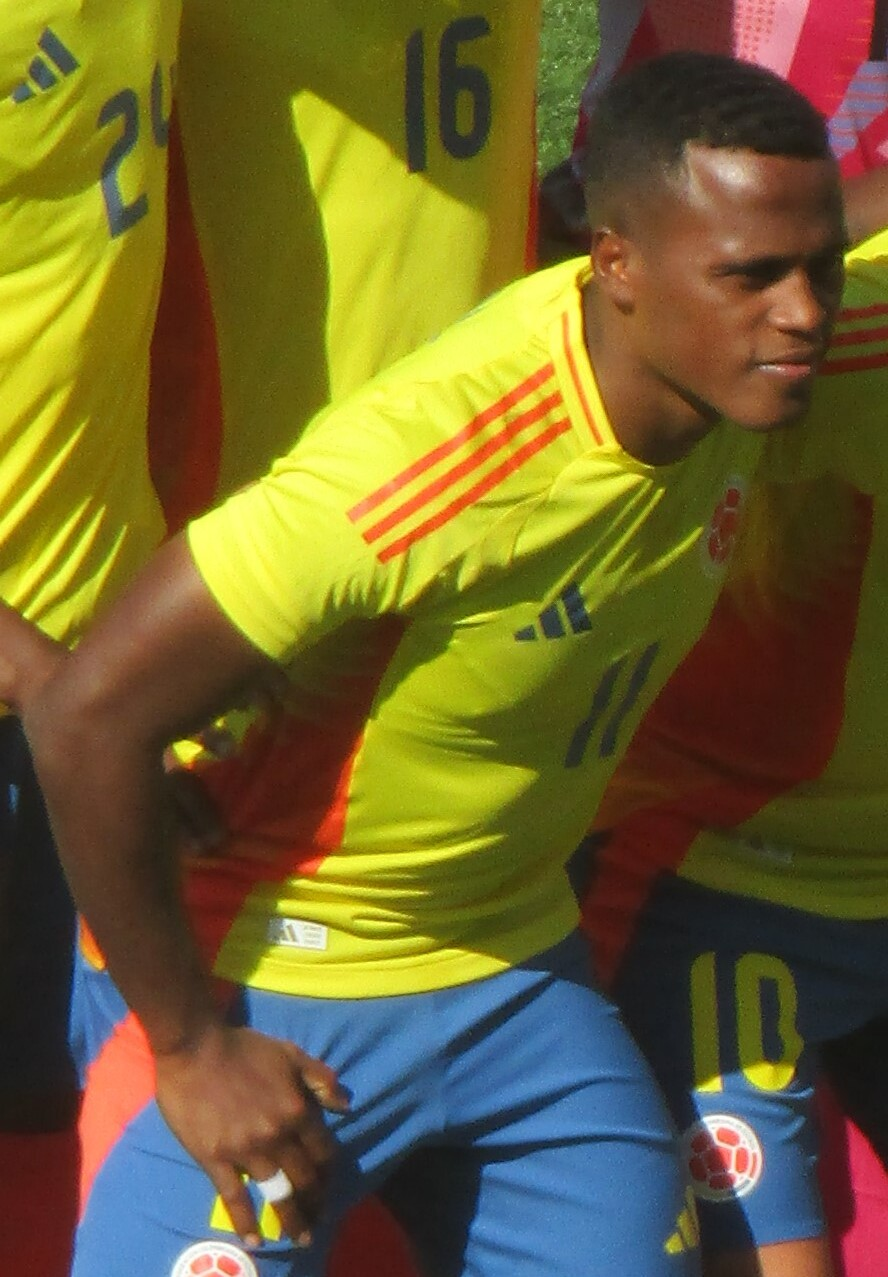
Arias with the Colombia national team in 2024

On 24 May 2022, Arias was called up to the Colombia national team for a friendly against Saudi Arabia. He made his full international debut on 5 June, starting in the 1–0 win at the Estadio Nueva Condomina in Murcia, Spain.

Arias scored his first goal for Colombia on 26 March 2024, scoring his side's second in a 3–2 win over Romania at the Metropolitano Stadium. On 23 May, he was included in the squad for the 2024 Copa América.

On 25 May 2026, he was named in head coach Néstor Lorenzo's final 26-man squad for the 2026 FIFA World Cup. He made his FIFA World Cup debut as a starter on 17 June in a 3–1 victory over Uzbekistan, making his first appearance at the tournament.

On 3 July, he scored his first competitive international goal to secure a 1–0 victory over Ghana, sealing Colombia's qualification for the Round of 16 of the 2026 FIFA World Cup.

== Philanthropy ==
Following the 2026 Colombia earthquake on 10 August, Arias and his wife, Alejandra Ayala, arranged an aircraft to transport medical personnel and supplies to his native Quibdó.

== Career statistics ==
=== Club ===
As of match played 8 November 2026

Appearances and goals by club, season and competition
Club	Season	League			State league (Note: Includes Campeonato Carioca, Campeonato Paulista)		National cup (Note: Includes Copa Colombia, Copa do Brasil, FA Cup)		Continental		Other		Total	
Club	Season	Division	Apps	Goals	Apps	Goals	Apps	Goals	Apps	Goals	Apps	Goals	Apps	Goals
Llaneros (loan)	2018	Categoría Primera B	31	5	—		4	1	—		—		35	6
Patriotas	2019	Categoría Primera A	36	4	—		2	0	—		—		38	4
América de Cali	2020	Categoría Primera A	21	1	—		1	0	5 (Note: Appearances in Copa Libertadores)	0	2 (Note: Appearances in Superliga Colombiana)	0	29	1
Santa Fe	2021	Categoría Primera A	22	3	—		0	0	6	0	—		28	3
Fluminense	2021	Série A	19	1	—		2	0	—		—		21	1
Fluminense	2022	Série A	33	7	13	4	7	2	9 (Note: Four appearances and one goal in Copa Libertadores, five appearances and two goals in Copa Sudamericana)	3	—		62	16
Fluminense	2023	Série A	29	7	13	2	4	0	13	2	2 (Note: Appearances in FIFA Club World Cup)	1	61	12
Fluminense	2024	Série A	27	7	8	2	4	2	10	1	2 (Note: Appearances in Recopa Sudamericana)	2	51	14
Fluminense	2025	Série A	12	1	10	1	4	1	3 (Note: Appearances in Copa Sudamericana)	0	6	1	35	4
Fluminense	Total		120	23	44	9	21	5	35	6	10	4	230	47
Wolverhampton Wanderers	2025–26	Premier League	23	1	—		1	1	—		2 (Note: Appearances in EFL Cup)	0	26	2
Palmeiras	2026	Série A	28	6	4	0	7	1	12	3	—		51	10
Career total			281	43	48	9	36	8	58	9	14	4	437	73

=== International ===
As of match played 6 October 2026

Appearances and goals by national team and year
National team	Year	Apps	Goals
Colombia	2022	2	0
Colombia	2023	9	0
Colombia	2024	16	3
Colombia	2025	7	0
Colombia	2026	12	4
Total		46	7

Scores and results list Colombia's goal tally first, score column indicates score after each Arias goal.

List of international goals scored by Jhon Arias
No.	Date	Venue	Cap	Opponent	Score	Result	Competition
1	26 March 2024	Metropolitano Stadium, Madrid, Spain	13	Romania	2–0	3–2	Friendly
2	8 June 2024	Commanders Field, Landover, United States	14	United States	1–0	5–1	Friendly
3	15 June 2024	Pratt & Whitney Stadium, East Hartford, United States	15	Bolivia	1–0	3–0	Friendly
4	26 March 2026	Camping World Stadium, Orlando, United States	35	Croatia	1–0	1–2	Friendly
5	7 June 2026	Snapdragon Stadium, San Diego, United States	38	Jordan	1–0	2–0	Friendly
6	7 June 2026	Snapdragon Stadium, San Diego, United States	38	Jordan	2–0	2–0	Friendly
7	3 July 2026	Arrowhead Stadium, Kansas City, United States	43	Ghana	1–0	1–0	2026 FIFA World Cup

== Honours ==
América de Cali

- Categoría Primera A: 2020

Fluminense

- Copa Libertadores: 2023
- Recopa Sudamericana: 2024
- Campeonato Carioca: 2022, 2023

Palmeiras

- Campeonato Paulista: 2026

Colombia

- Copa América runner-up: 2024

Individual

- Campeonato Carioca Team of the Year: 2023, 2025
- Copa Libertadores Team of the Year: 2023
- South American Team of the Year: 2023
- FIFA Club World Cup Bronze Ball: 2023
- FIFA Club World Cup Team of the Tournament: 2025
