= Matheus Martinelli =

Brazilian footballer (born 2001)

Personal information
- Full name: Matheus Martinelli Lima
- Date of birth: 5 October 2001 (age 25)
- Place of birth: Presidente Prudente, Brazil
- Height: 1.77 m (5 ft 10 in)
- Position: Midfielder

Team information
- Current team: Fluminense
- Number: 8

Youth career
- 2013–2014: Marília
- 2014–2015: Osvaldo Cruz
- 2015–2017: Grêmio Prudente
- 2017–2020: Fluminense

Senior career*
Years	Team	Apps	(Gls)
2020–	Fluminense	251	(13)

International career
2026–	Brazil	1	(0)
- * Club domestic league appearances and goals as of 14:34, 25 September 2026 (UTC)

Matheus Martinelli Lima (born 5 October 2001), known as Matheus Martinelli or just Martinelli, is a Brazilian professional footballer who plays as a midfielder for Campeonato Brasileiro Série A club Fluminense and the Brazil national team.

== Club career ==
Born in Presidente Prudente, São Paulo, Martinelli started playing football at Marília, later playing for other clubs from the State of São Paulo before joining Fluminense in 2017.

Martinelli made his professional debut for Fluminense on 1 December 2020, starting in a 0–0 Série A draw against Red Bull Bragantino. He subsequently became a regular with the Tricolor, scoring 3 goals in 11 games and being named Série A man of the weekend on the 16 February 2021 after his performance against Ceará, scoring the second goal in his team 3–1 away win.

On 18 January 2023, already established at Flu, Martinelli renewed his contract until December 2025, and featured in eight matches during the 2023 Copa Libertadores as the club won the competition for the first time ever. He agreed to a new deal until 2027 on 13 March 2025, and a further renewal until 2030 occurred on 24 February 2026.

== International career ==
Born in Brazil, Martinelli is of Italian descent and holds dual Brazilian and Italian citizenship. On 16 September 2026, Martinelli was called up to the Brazil football team for two friendlies against Australia and India, replacing injured João Pedro.

== Career statistics ==
As of 22 September 2026.

Club	Season	League			State League		Cup		Continental		Other		Total	
Club	Season	Division	Apps	Goals	Apps	Goals	Apps	Goals	Apps	Goals	Apps	Goals	Apps	Goals
Fluminense	2020	Série A	13	3	0	0	0	0	0	0	—		13	3
Fluminense	2021	Série A	31	0	10	0	5	0	9 (Note: Appearance(s) in Copa Libertadores)	0	—		55	0
Fluminense	2022	Série A	28	1	14	1	7	0	6	0	—		55	2
Fluminense	2023	Série A	28	2	12	1	1	0	8	0	2 (Note: Appearance(s) in FIFA Club World Cup)	0	51	3
Fluminense	2024	Série A	34	2	7	0	4	0	10	0	2 (Note: Appearance(s) in Recopa Sudamericana)	0	57	2
Fluminense	2025	Série A	33	3	9	0	9	0	7 (Note: Appearance(s) in Copa Sudamericana)	2	5	1	63	6
Fluminense	2026	Série A	20	0	8	0	3	1	7	0	—		38	1
Career total			187	11	64	2	29	1	47	2	9	1	332	17

== Honours ==
Fluminense

- Taça Guanabara: 2022, 2023
- Campeonato Carioca: 2022, 2023
- Copa Libertadores: 2023
- Recopa Sudamericana: 2024

Individual

- Campeonato Carioca Team of the year: 2026
