= Juan Pablo Freytes =

Argentine footballer

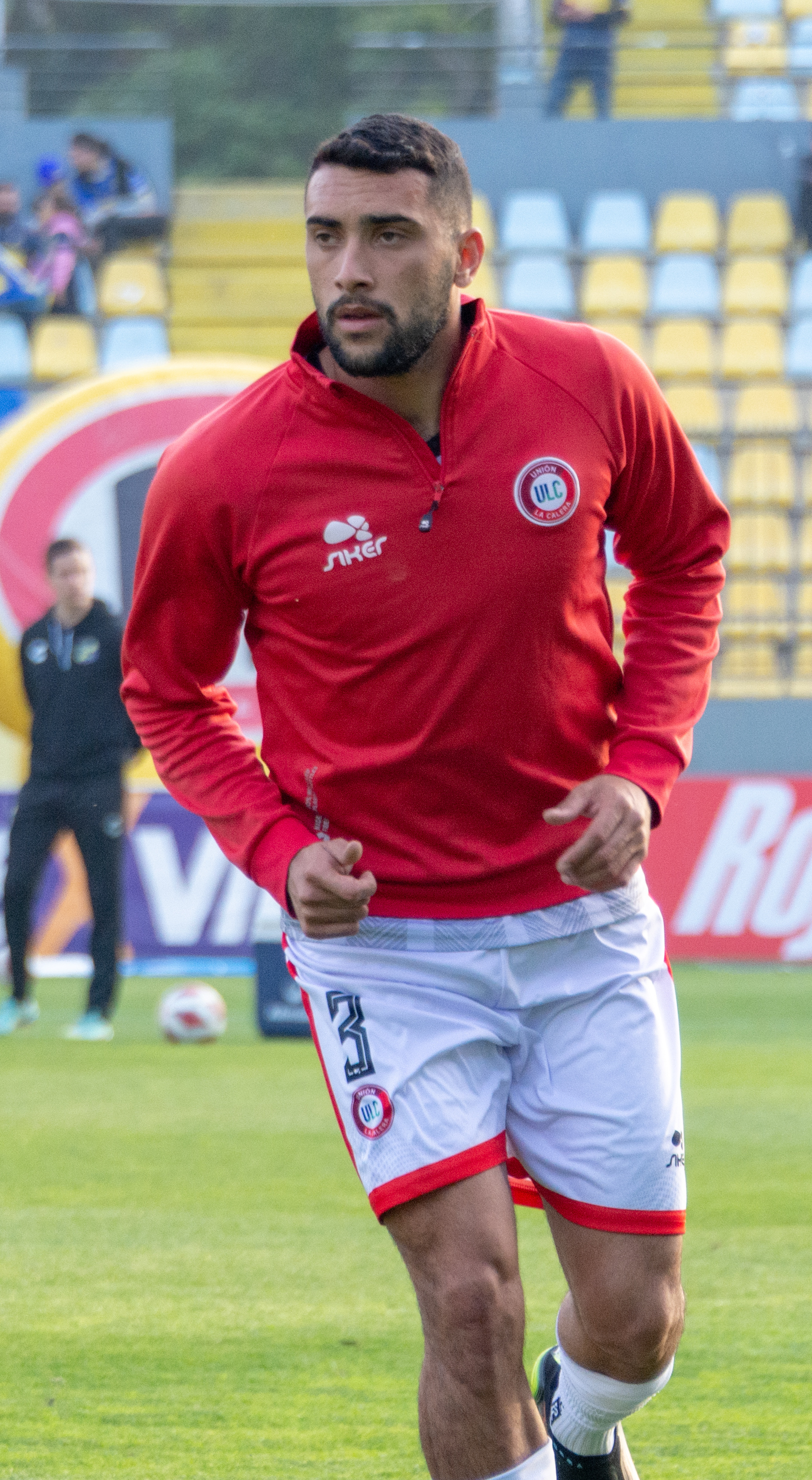
- Freytes with Unión La Calera in 2023

Personal information
- Date of birth: 11 January 2000 (age 26)
- Place of birth: Ticino, Argentina
- Height: 1.86 m (6 ft 1 in)
- Position: Centre-back

Team information
- Current team: Fluminense
- Number: 22

Youth career
- Newell's Old Boys

Senior career*
Years	Team	Apps	(Gls)
2018–2025	Newell's Old Boys	9	(0)
2021–2022	→ Independiente Rivadavia (loan)	53	(0)
2023	→ Unión La Calera (loan)	24	(2)
2024	→ Alianza Lima (loan)	34	(4)
2025–	Fluminense	57	(2)
- * Club domestic league appearances and goals as of 6 April 2026

Juan Pablo Freytes (born 11 January 2000) is an Argentine professional footballer who plays as a centre-back for Fluminense.

== Club career ==
Freytes played in the academy of Newell's Old Boys, with the defender featuring for the club's youth teams including the U17s in a friendly against the United States U17s in June 2017. He was promoted to their senior squad in 2018, subsequently going unused on the substitutes bench for two Primera División matches in 2018–19. Freytes' professional debut soon arrived in an away loss to San Lorenzo on 16 February 2019.

In the summer 2021, Freytes was loaned out to Independiente Rivadavia until the end of 2022 with an option to purchase 80% of his rights, for a fee around one million dollars.

In 2024, signed this year by Alianza Lima, Juan Freytes played 40 games, scored four goals and provided four assists.

At the end of 2024, Freytes was acquired by Fluminense, one of the clubs he faced while playing the Copa Libertadores 2024 group stage with Alianza. The Brazilian tricolor paid US$3,3 million for 70% of the defender's rights.

He was one of the best Fluminense players at the FIFA Club World Cup, even being complimented and highlighted as such by legendary Italian defender Marco Materazzi.

== International career ==
Freytes received a call-up to train with the Argentina national team in August 2017, ahead of friendlies with Uruguay and Venezuela.

== Career statistics ==
=== Club ===
As of 28 April 2024.

Club	Division	Season	League		Cup		Continental		Total	
Club	Division	Season	Apps	Goals	Apps	Goals	Apps	Goals	Apps	Goals
Newell's Old Boys	Primera División	2019	5	0	0	0	—		5	0
Newell's Old Boys	Primera División	2021	4	0	0	0	1	0	5	0
Newell's Old Boys	Total		9	0	0	0	1	0	10	0
Independiente Rivadavia	Primera Nacional	2021	17	0	0	0	—		17	0
Independiente Rivadavia	Primera Nacional	2022	34	0	2	0	—		36	0
Independiente Rivadavia	Total		51	0	2	0	0	0	53	0
Unión La Calera	Primera División	2023	24	2	2	0	—		26	2
Alianza Lima	Liga 1	2024	13	2	—		3	0	16	2
Career total			97	4	4	0	5	0	105	4
