= Dyogo Alves =

Brazilian footballer (born 2004)

Personal information
- Full name: Francisco Dyogo Bento Alves
- Date of birth: 9 January 2004 (age 22)
- Place of birth: Fortaleza, Brasil
- Height: 1.88 m (6 ft 2 in)
- Position: Goalkeeper

Team information
- Current team: Flamengo
- Number: 49

Youth career
- 2018–2024: Flamengo

Senior career*
Years	Team	Apps	(Gls)
2025–	Flamengo	5	(0)
- * Club domestic league appearances and goals as of 20:15, 11 December 2025 (UTC)

Francisco Dyogo Bento Alves (born 9 January 2004), known as Dyogo Alves, is a Brazilian professional footballer who plays as a goalkeeper for Campeonato Brasileiro Série A club Flamengo.

== Career ==
Born in Fortaleza, Ceará, Dyogo Alves joined Flamengo's youth sides in 2018. A survivor of the Ninho do Urubu fire incident in 2019, he renewed his contract until 2024 on 19 November 2021.

On 23 August 2024, Dyogo Alves further extended his link with Fla until December 2026. He made his first team debut the following 12 January, starting in a 2–1 home loss to Boavista as most of the first team regulars were away on vacation, and featured in a further three matches before their return.

Dyogo Alves made his Série A debut on 6 December 2025, starting in a 3–3 away draw against Mirassol as the club was already champions and most of the first team regulars were travelling to the 2025 FIFA Intercontinental Cup. In that competition, he was the immediate backup of Agustín Rossi after Matheus Cunha was cleared to return to Brazil for personal reasons.

== International career ==
In October 2023, João Victor was called up to the Brazil national under-17 team for the 2023 FIFA U-17 World Cup.

== Career statistics ==
As of 11 December 2025

Club	Season	League			State League		Cup		Continental		Other		Total	
Club	Season	Division	Apps	Goals	Apps	Goals	Apps	Goals	Apps	Goals	Apps	Goals	Apps	Goals
Flamengo	2025	Série A	1	0	4	0	0	0	0	0	0	0	5	0
Career total			1	0	4	0	0	0	0	0	0	0	5	0

== Honours ==
=== Club ===
==== Youth ====
Flamengo U17

- Campeonato Brasileiro Sub-17: 2021
- Copa do Brasil Sub-17: 2021

Flamengo U20

- Campeonato Brasileiro Sub-20: 2023
- Under-20 Intercontinental Cup: 2024

==== Professional ====
Flamengo

- FIFA Challenger Cup: 2025
- FIFA Derby of the Americas: 2025
- Copa Libertadores: 2025
- Campeonato Brasileiro Série A: 2025
- Campeonato Carioca: 2024, 2025
- Copa do Brasil: 2024
- Supercopa Rei: 2025
