= 2025 CR Flamengo season =

Flamengo
2025 season
- President: Luiz Eduardo Baptista
- Head coach: Filipe Luís
- Stadium: Maracanã
- Série A: 1st
- Campeonato Carioca: Winners
- Copa do Brasil: Round of 16
- Copa Libertadores: Winners
- Supercopa do Brasil: Winners
- FIFA Club World Cup: Round of 16
- FIFA Intercontinental Cup: Runners-up
- Top goalscorer: League: Giorgian de Arrascaeta (18); All: Giorgian de Arrascaeta (25)
- Highest home attendance: 73,244 (3 December 2025 vs Ceará, Campeonato Brasileiro Série A)
- Lowest home attendance: 3,793 (12 January 2025 vs Boavista, Campeonato Carioca)
- Average home league attendance: 58,732
Home colours	Away colours	Third colours

The 2025 season was Clube de Regatas do Flamengo's 130th year of existence, their 114th football season, and their 55th in the Campeonato Brasileiro Série A, having never been relegated from the top division. In addition to the 2025 Campeonato Brasileiro Série A, Flamengo also competed in the 2025 Supercopa do Brasil, 2025 FIFA Club World Cup, 2025 CONMEBOL Copa Libertadores, 2025 FIFA Intercontinental Cup, 2025 Copa do Brasil, and the 2025 Campeonato Carioca, the top tier of Rio de Janeiro's state football.

== Kits ==
Supplier: Adidas
Sponsors: Betano (Main sponsor) / Hapvida (Back of the shirt) / Assist Card (Lower back) / Banco BRB (Shoulder) / Shopee (Sleeves) / Texaco (Numbers) / ABC da Construção (Shorts) / Zé Delivery (Socks)

Kits from the 2025 season
Home	Home alt.^{1}	Home alt.^{2}	Home alt.^{3}	Home alt.^{4}	Away	Away alt.^{1}	Away alt.^{2}	Away alt.^{3}	Third

Goalkeeper^{1}	Goalkeeper^{2}	Goalkeeper^{3}	Goalkeeper^{4}

=== Kit information ===
This is Adidas's 12th year supplying Flamengo kit during its second stint with the team, having taken over from Olympikus at the beginning of the 2013 season. The deal was renewed for another 5 seasons on 29 April 2024.

- Home: The club revealed their new home kit for the 2025 season on 30 January. The kit maintain Flamengo's traditional colours of red and black and uses the concept "Minha sorte é ser Flamengo" ("My luck is being Flamengo"). The shirt is predominantly black (just like the previous season) and follows the Adidas' Tiro 24 template for the 2024–25 season. Inside the body of the shirt, there are six black stripes and five red stripes, with the formers having a red and a black outline on the stripes. It's complemented by white shorts (with details to a gradient-like from black to red, simulating the wings of a vulture) and black and red striped socks.
- Away: On 11 April, Flamengo released their away kit. Like the Home kit, it's based on Adidas' Tiro 24 template. The shirt has a white body and black sleeves with red graphics reminiscent of vulture wings. It's complemented by black shorts (which mirrors the layout of the Home shorts, but retains the latter's same black and red gradient-like graphic) and white socks.
- Third: On 31 July, Flamengo released their third kit, and references the club's origins in 1895. The entire kit is predominantly off-white, with details in gold, black, and red. The shirt features a texture that references the effect of oars moving on the water, in honor of Flamengo's rowing.
- GK: The new goalkeeper kits are based on Adidas' goalkeeper template for the 2024–25 season.

== Competitions ==
=== Overview ===
Competition	First match	Last match	Starting round	Final position	Record							
Competition	First match	Last match	Starting round	Final position	Pld	W	D	L	GF	GA	GD	Win %
Série A	29 March 2025	6 December 2025	Matchday 1	Winners	38	23	10	5	78	27	+51	60.53
Copa do Brasil	1 May 2025	6 August 2025	Third round	Round of 16	4	3	0	1	6	3	+3	75.00
Campeonato Carioca	12 January 2025	16 March 2025	Matchday 1	Winners	15	10	3	2	30	7	+23	66.67
Copa Libertadores	3 April 2025	29 November 2025	Group stage	Winners	13	8	3	2	13	5	+8	61.54
Supercopa do Brasil	2 February 2025		Final	Winners	1	1	0	0	3	1	+2	100.00
FIFA Club World Cup	16 June 2025	29 June 2025	Group stage	Round of 16	4	2	1	1	8	6	+2	50.00
FIFA Intercontinental Cup	10 December 2025	17 December 2025	Second round	Runners-up	3	2	1	0	5	2	+3	66.67
Total					78	49	18	11	143	51	+92	62.82

Source: Competitions

=== Pre-Season friendlies ===
Goals, assists and red cards are shown.

19 January 2025 FC Series 2025	Flamengo	0–0	São Paulo	Fort Lauderdale, United States
17:00 UTC−3		Report		Stadium: Chase Stadium; Referee: Alexis da Silva (United States)

=== Supercopa do Brasil ===
Flamengo qualified for the 2025 Supercopa do Brasil by winning the 2024 Copa do Brasil.

Goals, assists and red cards are shown.

2 February 2025 Final Clássico da Rivalidade	Botafogo	1–3	Flamengo	Belém
16:00 UTC−3	de Paula 87'	Report	Bruno Henrique; L. Araújo 83'	Stadium: Mangueirão; Attendance: 44,952; Referee: Ramon Abatti Abel

=== Campeonato Carioca ===
==== Taça Guanabara table ====
Pos	Team	Pld	W	D	L	GF	GA	GD	Pts	Qualification
1	Flamengo (C)	11	7	2	2	25	5	+20	23	Taça Guanabara Champion and advance to semifinals
2	Volta Redonda	11	6	2	3	13	12	+1	20	Advance to semifinals
3	Fluminense	11	4	5	2	13	9	+4	17	Advance to semifinals
4	Vasco da Gama	11	4	5	2	13	9	+4	17	Advance to semifinals
5	Sampaio Corrêa	11	4	4	3	13	11	+2	16	Advance to Taça Rio semifinals
6	Nova Iguaçu	11	4	4	3	8	9	−1	16	Advance to Taça Rio semifinals
7	Madureira	11	4	3	4	11	8	+3	15	Advance to Taça Rio semifinals
8	Boavista	11	2	8	1	10	8	+2	14	Advance to Taça Rio semifinals
9	Botafogo	11	4	1	6	11	12	−1	13	
10	Maricá	11	3	3	5	11	17	−6	12	
11	Portuguesa	11	3	1	7	12	24	−12	10	
12	Bangu (R)	11	0	4	7	4	20	−16	4	Relegated

Source: FERJ
Rules for classification: 1) points; 2) wins; 3) goal difference; 4) goals scored; 5) head-to-head results; 6) disciplinary record; 7) random draw.
(C) Champions; (R) Relegated

==== Matches ====
Goals, assists and red cards are shown.

12 January 2025 1	Flamengo	1–2	Boavista	Aracaju
16:00 UTC−3	Carlinhos 56'	Report	Zé Vitor 36' (Vitor Ricardo); Raí 66' (Conceição)	Stadium: Batistão; Attendance: 3,793; Referee: Pierry Dias dos Santos

16 January 2025 2	Madureira	1–1	Flamengo	Campina Grande
18:30 UTC−3	Marcelo 90+1' (pen.)	Report	Thiaguinho 66'	Stadium: Amigão; Attendance: 3,614; Referee: Tarcizo Pinheiro Caetano

19 January 2025 3	Flamengo	1–2	Nova Iguaçu	São Luís
21:00 UTC−3	Wallace Yan 52' (Gomes)	Report	Lucas Cruz 34' (Philippe); Rangel 67' (pen.)	Stadium: Castelão; Attendance: 4,696; Referee: Wallace Rufino de Lima

22 January 2025 4	Bangu	0–5	Flamengo	São Luís
19:00 UTC−3	Moretti (red card) 9'	Report	Teresa 40' (Wallace Yan); Wallace Yan 53' (Teresa); Carlinhos 59' (Gomes), 80'; Gomes 64' (Sales)	Stadium: Castelão; Attendance: 33,077; Referee: Carlos Tadeu Ferreira de Castro

25 January 2025 5	Volta Redonda	0–2	Flamengo	Brasília
16:30 UTC−3		Report	Michael 43'; Plata 47'	Stadium: Arena BRB Mané Garrincha; Attendance: 23,873; Referee: Alan Trindade da Silva

30 January 2025 6	Flamengo	2–0	Sampaio Corrêa	Rio de Janeiro
21:30 UTC−3	Wallace Yan 76' (L. Araújo); Alcaraz 88' (L. Araújo)	Report		Stadium: Maracanã; Attendance: 20,455; Referee: Júlio César de Oliveira

5 February 2025 8	Portuguesa	0–5	Flamengo	Uberlândia
19:00 UTC−3		Report	Juninho 37'; L. Araújo 57'; de Arrascaeta 60' (pen.); Gonçalves 70' (de Arrascaeta); Wallace Yan 87' (Gomes)	Stadium: Parque do Sabiá; Attendance: 16,296; Referee: Pierry Dias dos Santos

8 February 2025 9 Fla–Flu	Fluminense	0–0	Flamengo	Rio de Janeiro
16:30 UTC−3		Report		Stadium: Maracanã; Attendance: 37,838; Referee: Alex Gomes Stefano

12 February 2025 7 Clássico da Rivalidade	Flamengo	1–0	Botafogo	Rio de Janeiro
21:30 UTC−3	Ortiz; Gerson (red card) 90+6'; Cleiton (red card) 90+6'	Report	Barboza (yellow card) 87' (yellow-red card) 90+6'	Stadium: Maracanã; Attendance: 33,465; Referee: Bruno Mota Correia

15 February 2025 10 Clássico dos Milhões	Flamengo	2–0	Vasco da Gama	Rio de Janeiro
21:45 UTC−3	Bruno Henrique 30' (pen.); Everton 89' (Wesley)	Report		Stadium: Maracanã; Attendance: 44,543; Referee: Wagner do Nascimento Magalhães

22 February 2025 11	Flamengo	5–0	Maricá	Rio de Janeiro
19:00 UTC−3	Gerson 17'; Ortiz 26'; de Arrascaeta 57' (Plata); L. Araújo 59' (de Arrascaeta); Gonçalves 81' (Wallace Yan)	Report		Stadium: Maracanã; Attendance: 29,544; Referee: Yuri Elino Ferreira da Cruz

==== Semi-finals ====
1 March 2025 First leg Clássico dos Milhões	Vasco da Gama	0–1	Flamengo	Rio de Janeiro
17:45 UTC−3		Report	Bruno Henrique 67' (Plata)	Stadium: Nilton Santos; Attendance: 10,966; Referee: Bruno Arleu de Araújo

8 March 2025 Second leg Clássico dos Milhões	Flamengo	2–1 (3–1 agg.)	Vasco da Gama	Rio de Janeiro
17:45 UTC−3	Bruno Henrique 36'; L. Araújo	Report	Moreira 22' (Freitas)	Stadium: Maracanã; Attendance: 55,096; Referee: Wagner do Nascimento Magalhães

==== Finals ====
12 March 2025 First leg Fla–Flu	Fluminense	1–2	Flamengo	Rio de Janeiro
21:30 UTC−3	Keno 88' (Fuentes); Freytes (red card) 90+7'	Report	Wesley 6' (Plata); Juninho 76'	Stadium: Maracanã; Attendance: 39,120; Referee: Yuri Elino Ferreira da Cruz

16 March 2025 Second leg Fla–Flu	Flamengo	0–0 (2–1 agg.)	Fluminense	Rio de Janeiro
16:00 UTC−3		Report		Stadium: Maracanã; Attendance: 69,393; Referee: Bruno Arleu de Araújo

=== Copa Libertadores ===
The draw for the group stage will be held on 17 March 2025 on the CONMEBOL headquarters in Luque, Paraguay.

==== Group stage ====
Pos	Team	Pld	W	D	L	GF	GA	GD	Pts	Qualification	LDQ	FLA	CCO	TAC
1	(Ecuador) LDU Quito	6	3	2	1	8	4	+4	11	Advance to round of 16	—	0–0	3–0	2–0
2	(Brazil) Flamengo	6	3	2	1	6	3	+3	11	Advance to round of 16	2–0	—	1–2	1–0
3	(Argentina) Central Córdoba	6	3	2	1	7	7	0	11	Transfer to Copa Sudamericana	0–0	1–1	—	2–1
4	(Venezuela) Deportivo Táchira	6	0	0	6	4	11	−7	0		2–3	0–1	1–2	—

Source: CONMEBOL
Rules for classification: 1) Points; 2) Goal difference; 3) Goals scored; 4) Away goals scored; 5) CONMEBOL ranking.

==== Matches ====
Goals, assists and red cards are shown.

3 April 2025 1	Deportivo Táchira (Venezuela)	0–1	(Brazil) Flamengo	San Cristóbal, Venezuela
21:30 UTC−3		Report	Juninho	Stadium: Polideportivo de Pueblo Nuevo; Attendance: 18,138; Referee: Gery Vargas (Bolivia)

9 April 2025 2	Flamengo (Brazil)	1–2	(Argentina) Central Córdoba	Rio de Janeiro, Brazil
21:30 UTC−3	de la Cruz 60'	Report	Heredia 24' (pen.); Florentín 44' (Cufré)	Stadium: Maracanã; Attendance: 56,515; Referee: Cristian Garay (Chile)

22 April 2025 3	LDU Quito (Ecuador)	0–0	(Brazil) Flamengo	Quito, Ecuador
19:00 UTC−3		Report		Stadium: Casa Blanca; Attendance: 17,883; Referee: Derlis López (Paraguay)

7 May 2025 4	Central Córdoba (Argentina)	1–1	(Brazil) Flamengo	Santiago del Estero, Argentina
21:30 UTC−3	Verón 61' (Angulo)	Report	de Arrascaeta	Stadium: Único Madre de Ciudades; Attendance: 19,969; Referee: Felipe González (Chile)

15 May 2025 5	Flamengo (Brazil)	2–0	(Ecuador) LDU Quito	Rio de Janeiro, Brazil
21:30 UTC−3	Ortiz 10' (L. Araújo); L. Araújo 54'	Report		Stadium: Maracanã; Attendance: 65,831; Referee: Andrés Rojas (Colombia)

28 May 2025 6	Flamengo (Brazil)	1–0	(Venezuela) Deportivo Táchira	Rio de Janeiro, Brazil
21:30 UTC−3	Pereira 66' (L. Araújo)	Report		Stadium: Maracanã; Attendance: 66,082; Referee: Carlos Ortega (Colombia)

==== Round of 16 ====
The draw for the round of 16 was held on 2 June 2025.

Goals, assists and red cards are shown.

13 August 2025 1st leg	Flamengo (Brazil)	1–0	(Brazil) Internacional	Rio de Janeiro, Brazil
21:30 UTC−3	Bruno Henrique 28' (L. Araújo)	Report		Stadium: Maracanã; Attendance: 68,483; Referee: Darío Herrera (Argentina)

20 August 2025 2nd leg	Internacional (Brazil)	0–2 (0–3 agg.)	(Brazil) Flamengo	Porto Alegre, Brazil
21:30 UTC−3		Report	de Arrascaeta 27' (Plata); Pedro	Stadium: Beira-Rio; Attendance: 43,581; Referee: Esteban Ostojich (Uruguay)

==== Quarter-finals ====
Goals, assists and red cards are shown.

18 September 2025 1st leg	Flamengo (Brazil)	2–1	(Argentina) Estudiantes de La Plata	Rio de Janeiro, Brazil
21:30 UTC−3	Pedro 1' (Plata); Varela 9' (Ayrton Lucas); Plata (yellow card) 72' (yellow-red card) 82'	Report	Pereira 90+1' (o.g.)	Stadium: Maracanã; Attendance: 71,977; Referee: Andrés Rojas (Colombia)
Note: After the match, CONMEBOL admitted that Gonzalo Plata's sent off was incorrect and overturned the red card.

25 September 2025 2nd leg	Estudiantes de La Plata (Argentina)	1–0 (2–2 agg.) (2–4 p)	(Brazil) Flamengo	La Plata, Argentina
21:30 UTC−3	Benedetti 45+2' (Núñez)	Report		Stadium: Uno; Attendance: 32,530; Referee: Piero Maza (Chile)
	Penalties
	Sosa (penalty scored); Benedetti (penalty missed); Cetré (penalty scored); Ascacíbar (penalty missed)		Jorginho (penalty scored); L. Araújo (penalty scored); Carrascal (penalty scored); Pereira (penalty scored)

==== Semi-finals ====
Goals, assists and red cards are shown.

22 October 2025 1st leg	Flamengo (Brazil)	1–0	(Argentina) Racing	Rio de Janeiro, Brazil
21:30 UTC−3	Rojo 88' (o.g.)	Report		Stadium: Maracanã; Attendance: 71,738; Referee: Jesús Valenzuela (Venezuela)

29 October 2025 2nd leg	Racing (Argentina)	0–0 (0–1 agg.)	(Brazil) Flamengo	Avellaneda, Argentina
21:30 UTC−3		Report	Plata (red card) 56'	Stadium: El Cilindro; Referee: Piero Maza (Chile)

==== Final ====
29 November 2025 Final	Palmeiras (Brazil)	0–1	(Brazil) Flamengo	Lima, Peru
18:15 UTC−3		Report	Danilo 67' (de Arrascaeta)	Stadium: Monumental "U"; Attendance: 40,048; Referee: Darío Herrera (Argentina)

=== Campeonato Brasileiro ===
==== League table ====
Pos	Team	Pld	W	D	L	GF	GA	GD	Pts	Qualification or relegation
1	Flamengo (C)	38	23	10	5	78	27	+51	79	Qualification for Copa Libertadores group stage (Note: Flamengo qualified for the Copa Libertadores group stage by winning the 2025 Copa Libertadores.)
2	Palmeiras	38	23	7	8	66	33	+33	76	Qualification for Copa Libertadores group stage
3	Cruzeiro	38	19	13	6	55	31	+24	70	Qualification for Copa Libertadores group stage
4	Mirassol	38	18	13	7	63	39	+24	67	Qualification for Copa Libertadores group stage
5	Fluminense	38	19	7	12	50	39	+11	64	Qualification for Copa Libertadores group stage

Source: CBF
Rules for classification: 1) points; 2) wins; 3) goal difference; 4) goals scored; 5) head-to-head results (only between two teams); 6) fewest red cards; 7) fewest yellow cards; 8) drawing of lots.
(C) Champions

==== Results by round ====
Round	1	2	3	4	5	6	7	8	9	10	11	12	13	14	15	16	17	18	19	20	21	22	23	24	25	26	27	28	29	30	31	32	33	34	35	36	37	38
Ground	H	A	A	H	A	H	A	H	H	A	H	A (Note: Matchday 12 originally scheduled for 10 June 2025 was postponed and has been played between matchdays 33 and 34 on 15 November 2025.)	H	A	H	A	H	A	H	A	H	H	A	H	A	H	A	A	H	A	H	A	H	A	H	A	H	A
Result	D	W	W	W	D	W	L	W	D	W	W	W	W	L	W	W	W	D	W	W	W	D	W	D	W	D	L	W	W	L	W	D	W	L	W	D	W	D
Position	9	6	1	1	2	1	3	2	2	2	1	1	1	2	2	2	1	1	1	1	1	1	1	1	1	1	2	2	2	2	2	2	2	1	1	1	1	1
Points	1	4	7	10	11	14	14	17	18	21	24	71	27	27	30	33	36	37	40	43	46	47	50	51	54	55	55	58	61	61	64	65	68	71	74	75	78	79

Source: Matches
A = Away; H = Home; W = Win; D = Draw; L = Loss; P = Postponed; = Leader; = Copa Libertadores group stage; = Copa Libertadores second stage; = Copa Sudamericana group stage; = Relegation to Série B

==== Matches ====
Goals, assists and red cards are shown.

29 March 2025 1	Flamengo	1–1	Internacional	Rio de Janeiro
21:00 UTC−3	Pereira	Report	Bruno Henrique 34' (Bernabei)	Stadium: Maracanã; Attendance: 48,452; Referee: Davi de Oliveira Lacerda

6 April 2025 2	Vitória	1–2	Flamengo	Salvador
18:30 UTC−3	Rato	Report	de Arrascaeta 62'; Bruno Henrique 87' (L. Araújo)	Stadium: Barradão; Attendance: 29,493; Referee: Rafael Rodrigo Klein

13 April 2025 3	Grêmio	0–2	Flamengo	Porto Alegre
17:30 UTC−3		Report	de Arrascaeta 4', 67' (Everton)	Stadium: Arena do Grêmio; Attendance: 23,367; Referee: Ramon Abatti Abel

16 April 2025 4	Flamengo	6–0	Juventude	Rio de Janeiro
21:30 UTC−3	Pulgar 13' (de Arrascaeta); Plata; Danilo 22' (de Arrascaeta); de Arrascaeta; Pedro 71' (Wesley), (penalty missed) 81' (pen.), 81'	Report		Stadium: Maracanã; Attendance: 31,445; Referee: Matheus Delgado Candançan

19 April 2025 5 Clássico dos Milhões	Vasco da Gama	0–0	Flamengo	Rio de Janeiro
18:30 UTC−3		Report		Stadium: Maracanã; Attendance: 39,027; Referee: Raphael Claus

27 April 2025 6	Flamengo	4–0	Corinthians	Rio de Janeiro
16:00 UTC−3	Everton 5' (de Arrascaeta); de Arrascaeta; Pedro 37', 78' (pen.)	Report		Stadium: Maracanã; Attendance: 67,501; Referee: Ramon Abatti Abel

4 May 2025 7	Cruzeiro	2–1	Flamengo	Belo Horizonte
18:30 UTC−3	Kaio Jorge 15' (Romero); Gabriel (penalty missed) 90+7' (pen.), 90+7'	Report	de Arrascaeta	Stadium: Mineirão; Attendance: 52,752; Referee: Wilton Pereira Sampaio

10 May 2025 8	Flamengo	1–0	Bahia	Rio de Janeiro
21:00 UTC−3	de Arrascaeta; Gerson (red card) 87'	Report		Stadium: Maracanã; Attendance: 62,204; Referee: Anderson Daronco

18 May 2025 9 Clássico da Rivalidade	Flamengo	0–0	Botafogo	Rio de Janeiro
18:30 UTC−3		Report		Stadium: Maracanã; Attendance: 54,238; Referee: Bruno Arleu de Araújo

25 May 2025 10	Palmeiras	0–2	Flamengo	São Paulo
16:00 UTC−3	Piquerez (penalty missed) 17'	Report	de Arrascaeta 73' (pen.); Ayrton Lucas 87' (Wallace Yan)	Stadium: Allianz Parque; Attendance: 41,075; Referee: Ramon Abatti Abel

1 June 2025 11	Flamengo	5–0	Fortaleza	Rio de Janeiro
18:30 UTC−3	de Arrascaeta 30' (Ortiz); E. Araújo 48' (Varela); L. Araújo; Michael 71' (Varela)	Report		Stadium: Maracanã; Attendance: 64,900; Referee: Gustavo Ervino Bauermann

12 July 2025 13	Flamengo	2–0	São Paulo	Rio de Janeiro
16:30 UTC−3	L. Araújo 61' (Wesley); Wallace Yan 90+6'	Report		Stadium: Maracanã; Attendance: 67,359; Referee: Wilton Pereira Sampaio

16 July 2025 14	Santos	1–0	Flamengo	Santos
21:30 UTC−3	Neymar	Report		Stadium: Vila Belmiro; Attendance: 13,541; Referee: Felipe Fernandes de Lima

20 July 2025 15 Fla–Flu	Flamengo	1–0	Fluminense	Rio de Janeiro
19:30 UTC−3	Pedro 85' (Ortiz)	Report		Stadium: Maracanã; Attendance: 58,416; Referee: Raphael Claus

23 July 2025 16	Red Bull Bragantino	1–2	Flamengo	Bragança Paulista
21:30 UTC−3	Barbosa 46' (Jhon Jhon)	Report	Pereira 66' (de Arrascaeta); Wesley 85' (Wallace Yan)	Stadium: Cícero de Souza Marques; Attendance: 7,537; Referee: Davi de Oliveira Lacerda

27 July 2025 17 Flamengo Atlético-MG rivalry	Flamengo	1–0	Atlético Mineiro	Rio de Janeiro
20:30 UTC−3	Ortiz 75' (L. Araújo)	Report		Stadium: Maracanã; Attendance: 54,550; Referee: Ramon Abatti Abel

3 August 2025 18	Ceará	1–1	Flamengo	Fortaleza
18:30 UTC−3	Pedro Raul 67' (Mugni)	Report	de Arrascaeta 37' (Plata)	Stadium: Castelão; Attendance: 57,867; Referee: Rodrigo José Pereira de Lima

9 August 2025 19	Flamengo	2–1	Mirassol	Rio de Janeiro
18:30 UTC−3	Pereira 19' (Lino); Plata 68' (de Arrascaeta)	Report	Gabriel 73'	Stadium: Maracanã; Attendance: 64,018; Referee: Paulo Cesar Zanovelli da Silva

17 August 2025 20	Internacional	1–3	Flamengo	Porto Alegre
18:30 UTC−3	Borré 90+2' (Bernabéi)	Report	Pedro 7' (Varela), 12' (de Arrascaeta); Plata 62' (de Arrascaeta)	Stadium: Beira-Rio; Attendance: 23,224; Referee: Rodrigo José Pereira de Lima

25 August 2025 21	Flamengo	8–0	Vitória	Rio de Janeiro
21:00 UTC−3	Lino 2' (de Arrascaeta), 50' (Varela); Pedro 3' (de Arrascaeta), 47' (Lino), 59' (Lino); de Arrascaeta 34' (Lino); L. Araújo; Bruno Henrique 81' (pen.)	Report		Stadium: Maracanã; Attendance: 60,642; Referee: Felipe Fernandes de Lima

31 August 2025 22	Flamengo	1–1	Grêmio	Rio de Janeiro
16:00 UTC−3	de Arrascaeta	Report	Volpi 85' (pen.)	Stadium: Maracanã; Attendance: 69,447; Referee: Paulo Cesar Zanovelli da Silva

14 September 2025 23	Juventude	0–2	Flamengo	Caxias do Sul
16:00 UTC−3		Report	de Arrascaeta; Emerson 87' (Carrascal)	Stadium: Alfredo Jaconi; Attendance: 15,204; Referee: Raphael Claus

21 September 2025 24 Clássico dos Milhões	Flamengo	1–1	Vasco da Gama	Rio de Janeiro
17:30 UTC−3	Carrascal 11'	Report	Rayan 20' (Coutinho)	Stadium: Maracanã; Attendance: 62,156; Referee: Rafael Rodrigo Klein

28 September 2025 25	Corinthians	1–2	Flamengo	São Paulo
20:30 UTC−3	Yuri Alberto (penalty missed) 14' (pen.) 47' (Gui Negão)	Report	de Arrascaeta 55' (Carrascal); L. Araújo 87' (Carrascal)	Stadium: Neo Química Arena; Attendance: 40,629; Referee: Wilton Pereira Sampaio

2 October 2025 26	Flamengo	0–0	Cruzeiro	Rio de Janeiro
20:30 UTC−3		Report	William (yellow card) 45+1' (yellow-red card) 83'	Stadium: Maracanã; Attendance: 72,565; Referee: Ramon Abatti Abel

5 October 2025 27	Bahia	1–0	Flamengo	Salvador
18:30 UTC−3	Willian José 45'	Report	Danilo (red card) 13'; Wallace Yan (yellow card) 75' (yellow-red card) 78'	Stadium: Casa de Apostas Arena Fonte Nova; Attendance: 48,634; Referee: Rodrigo José Pereira de Lima

15 October 2025 28 Clássico da Rivalidade	Botafogo	0–3	Flamengo	Rio de Janeiro
19:30 UTC−3		Report	Pedro 40' (de Arrascaeta); L. Araújo; Plata 80' (Carrascal)	Stadium: Nilton Santos; Attendance: 22,635; Referee: Alex Gomes Stefano

19 October 2025 29	Flamengo	3–2	Palmeiras	Rio de Janeiro
16:00 UTC−3	de Arrascaeta; Jorginho 42' (pen.); Pedro 45' (de Arrascaeta)	Report	Vitor Roque 25' (Khellven); Gómez 90+4'; Piquerez (red card) 90+5'	Stadium: Maracanã; Attendance: 71,651; Referee: Wilton Pereira Sampaio

25 October 2025 30	Fortaleza	1–0	Flamengo	Fortaleza
19:30 UTC−3	Lopes 12' (Herrera)	Report		Stadium: Arena Castelão; Referee: Davi de Oliveira Lacerda

1 November 2025 31	Flamengo	3–0	Sport	Rio de Janeiro
21:00 UTC−3	Bruno Henrique 51' (Lino), 61'; de Arrascaeta 67'; E. Araújo (red card) 86'	Report		Stadium: Maracanã; Attendance: 67,598; Referee: Fernando Antonio Mendes

5 November 2025 32	São Paulo	2–2	Flamengo	Santos
21:30 UTC−3	Luciano 3'; Ferreira	Report	de Arrascaeta 8' (pen.); Lino 64' (Emerson); Plata (red card) 67'	Stadium: Vila Belmiro; Attendance: 11,228; Referee: Rodrigo José Pereira de Lima
Note: Fixture originally scheduled for Morumbi but moved to Vila Belmiro due to Linkin Park show.

9 November 2025 33	Flamengo	3–2	Santos	Rio de Janeiro
18:30 UTC−3	Pereira 37'; Carrascal 51' (de Arrascaeta); de Arrascaeta (penalty missed) 68' (pen.); Bruno Henrique 81'	Report	Bontempo 89'; Díaz 90+1' (Rollheiser)	Stadium: Maracanã; Attendance: 69,612; Referee: Sávio Pereira Sampaio

15 November 2025 12	Sport	1–5	Flamengo	São Lourenço da Mata
18:30 UTC−3	Pablo 15'; Matheus Alexandre (yellow card) 27' (yellow-red card) 37'; Ramon (yellow card) 9' (yellow-red card) 42'	Report	L. Araújo; Juninho 61'; Bruno Henrique 63' (L. Araújo); Ayrton Lucas 71' (Everton); Douglas 80' (Everton)	Stadium: Arena Pernambuco; Attendance: 19,706; Referee: Rafael Rodrigo Klein
Note: Fixture originally scheduled for 10 June, postponed due to Flamengo's participation in the FIFA Club World Cup.

19 November 2025 34 Fla–Flu	Fluminense	2–1	Flamengo	Rio de Janeiro
21:30 UTC−3	Acosta; Serna 33'	Report	Jorginho 85' (pen.)	Stadium: Maracanã; Attendance: 69,591; Referee: Davi De Oliveira Lacerda

22 November 2025 35	Flamengo	3–0	Red Bull Bragantino	Rio de Janeiro
21:30 UTC−3	de Arrascaeta; Jorginho 64' (pen.); Bruno Henrique 72' (de Arrascaeta)	Report		Stadium: Maracanã; Attendance: 68,408; Referee: Fernando Antonio Mendes

25 November 2025 36 Flamengo Atlético-MG rivalry	Atlético Mineiro	1–1	Flamengo	Belo Horizonte
21:30 UTC−3	Bernard; Rony (red card) 90+4'	Report	Bruno Henrique	Stadium: Arena MRV; Attendance: 18,321; Referee: Rafael Rodrigo Klein

3 December 2025 37	Flamengo	1–0	Ceará	Rio de Janeiro
21:30 UTC−3	Lino 37' (Carrascal)	Report		Stadium: Maracanã; Attendance: 73,244; Referee: Rodrigo José Pereira de Lima

6 December 2025 38	Mirassol	3–3	Flamengo	Mirassol
18:30 UTC−3	Chico 13' (Felipe Jonatan); Alesson; Cristian Renato 65'	Report	Telles 8'; Gomes 31' (Johnny), 59'	Stadium: José Maria de Campos Maia; Attendance: 10,278; Referee: Lucas Casagrande

=== Copa do Brasil ===
==== Third round ====
Goals, assists and red cards are shown.

1 May 2025 1st leg	Botafogo-PB	0–1	Flamengo	São Luís
20:00 UTC−3		Report	Joshua 85'	Stadium: Castelão; Attendance: 35,381; Referee: João Vitor Gobi

21 May 2025 2nd leg	Flamengo	4–2 (5–2 agg.)	Botafogo-PB	Rio de Janeiro
21:30 UTC−3	Danilo; Pedro 7' (Everton); Varela 22' (Ayrton Lucas); Everton 49' (Varela)	Report	Dourado 36' (Honório); Alves 69'	Stadium: Maracanã; Attendance: 25,814; Referee: Lucas Paulo Torezin

==== Round of 16 ====
The draw for the round of 16 was held on 2 June 2025.

Goals, assists and red cards are shown.

31 July 2025 1st leg	Flamengo	0–1	Atlético Mineiro	Rio de Janeiro
21:30 UTC−3		Report	Cuello 66'	Stadium: Maracanã; Attendance: 64,681; Referee: Raphael Claus

6 August 2025 2nd leg	Atlético Mineiro	0–1 (1–1 agg.) (4–3 p)	Flamengo	Belo Horizonte
19:00 UTC−3		Report	Everton 21' (Plata)	Stadium: Arena MRV; Attendance: 38,873; Referee: Rafael Rodrigo Klein
	Penalties
	Hulk (penalty scored); Scarpa (penalty scored); Alonso (penalty missed); Gomes (penalty scored); Everson (penalty scored)		de Arrascaeta (penalty scored); Jorginho (penalty scored); Saúl (penalty scored); Lino (penalty missed); Wallace Yan (penalty missed)

=== FIFA Club World Cup ===
The draw was held on 5 December 2024.

Originally León was set to participate in the tournament as winner of the 2023 CONCACAF Champions League. On 21 March 2025, the team was removed from the tournament due to violating the FIFA Appeal Committee's rules on multi-club ownership, as León and Pachuca have the same owner. They were replaced with Los Angeles FC or Club América. On 31 May 2025 Los Angeles FC beat Club América 2–1 in extra time to claim the final tournament spot.

==== Group stage ====
Pos	Team	Pld	W	D	L	GF	GA	GD	Pts	Qualification
1	(Brazil) Flamengo	3	2	1	0	6	2	+4	7	Advance to knockout stage
2	(England) Chelsea	3	2	0	1	6	3	+3	6	Advance to knockout stage
3	(Tunisia) Espérance de Tunis	3	1	0	2	1	5	−4	3	
4	(United States) Los Angeles FC	3	0	1	2	1	4	−3	1	

Source: FIFA
Rules for classification: Group stage tiebreakers

==== Matches ====
Goals, assists and red cards are shown.

16 June 2025 1	Flamengo (Brazil)	2–0	(Tunisia) Espérance de Tunis	Philadelphia, United States
22:00 UTC−3	de Arrascaeta 17' (L. Araújo); L. Araújo	Report		Stadium: Lincoln Financial Field; Attendance: 25,797; Referee: Danny Makkelie (Netherlands)

20 June 2025 2	Flamengo (Brazil)	3–1	(England) Chelsea	Philadelphia, United States
15:00 UTC−3	Bruno Henrique 62' (Plata); Danilo; Wallace Yan 83' (Plata)	Report	Neto 13'; Jackson (red card) 68'	Stadium: Lincoln Financial Field; Attendance: 54,619; Referee: Iván Barton (El Salvador)

24 June 2025 3	Los Angeles FC (United States)	1–1	(Brazil) Flamengo	Orlando, United States
22:00 UTC−3	Bouanga 84' (Tillman)	Report	Wallace Yan	Stadium: Camping World Stadium; Attendance: 32,933; Referee: Salman Falahi (Qatar)

==== Matches ====
Goals, assists and red cards are shown.

29 June 2025 Round of 16	Flamengo (Brazil)	2–4	(Germany) Bayern Munich	Miami Gardens, United States
17:00 UTC−3	Gerson 33' (de Arrascaeta); Jorginho 55' (pen.)	Report	Pulgar 6' (o.g.); Kane 9' (Upamecano), 73' (Kimmich); Goretzka 41'	Stadium: Hard Rock Stadium; Attendance: 60,914; Referee: Michael Oliver (England)

=== FIFA Intercontinental Cup ===
Flamengo qualified to the 2025 FIFA Intercontinental Cup as the 2025 Copa Libertadores champions, the club entered the FIFA Intercontinental Cup in the Second round.

==== Second round ====
Goals, assists and red cards are shown.

10 December 2025 Second round	Cruz Azul (Mexico)	1–2	(Brazil) Flamengo	Al Rayyan, Qatar
14:00 UTC−3	J. Sánchez	Report	de Arrascaeta 15', 71'	Stadium: Ahmad bin Ali Stadium; Attendance: 7,108; Referee: Glenn Nyberg (Sweden)

==== Play-off ====
Goals, assists and red cards are shown.

13 December 2025 Play-off	Flamengo (Brazil)	2–0	(Egypt) Pyramids	Al Rayyan, Qatar
14:00 UTC−3	Pereira 24' (de Arrascaeta); Danilo 52' (de Arrascaeta)	Report		Stadium: Ahmad bin Ali Stadium; Attendance: 8,368; Referee: Abdulrahman Al-Jassim (Qatar)

==== Final ====
Goals, assists and red cards are shown.

17 December 2025 Final	Paris Saint-Germain (France)	1–1 (a.e.t.) (2–1 p)	(Brazil) Flamengo	Al Rayyan, Qatar
14:00 UTC−3	Kvaratskhelia 38'	Report; FIFA	Jorginho 62' (pen.)	Stadium: Ahmad bin Ali Stadium; Attendance: 42,150; Referee: Ismail Elfath (United States)
	Penalties
	Vitinha (penalty scored); Dembélé (penalty missed); Mendes (penalty scored); Barcola (penalty missed)		de la Cruz (penalty scored); Saúl (penalty missed); Pedro (penalty missed); Léo Pereira (penalty missed); L. Araújo (penalty missed)

== Management team ==
As of 13 May 2025.

Position	Name
Board of directors
Director of football	(Portugal) José Boto
Assistant director of football	(Brazil) Bruno Spindel
Coaching staff
Head coach	(Brazil) Filipe Luís
Assistant head coach	(Spain) Iván Palanco
Assistant head coach	(Brazil) Márcio de Moraes Torres
Assistant head coach	(Brazil) Rodrigo Caio
Goalkeepers trainer	(Brazil) Rogério Maia
Goalkeepers trainer	(Brazil) Thiago Eller
Performance analyst	(Brazil) Wellington Sales
Performance analyst	(Brazil) Eduardo Coimbra
Performance analyst	(Brazil) Arthur Souza
Performance analyst	(Brazil) Victor Saad
Head of scouting	(Ukraine) Andrii Fedchenkov
Medical staff
Health and high performance manager	(Brazil) Fernando Sassaki
Fitness coach	(Brazil) Diogo Linhares
Fitness coach	(Brazil) Arthur Peixoto
Fitness coach	(Brazil) Júnior Bezerra
Doctor	(Brazil) Marcelo Soares
Doctor	(Brazil) Fernando Bassan
Physiotherapist	(Brazil) Laniyan Neves

== Roster ==
List of currently full members of the professional team, youth players are also often used. Ages on 31 December 2025.

As of 13 December 2025

No.	Pos.	Nat.	Name	Date of birth (age)	Signed in	Contract end	Signed from	Transfer fee	Notes
Goalkeepers
1	GK	(Argentina)	Agustín Rossi	21 August 1995 (aged 30)	2023	2027	(Argentina) Boca Juniors	Free	
25	GK	(Brazil)	Matheus Cunha	24 May 2001 (aged 24)	2022	2025	Youth system		
49	GK	(Brazil)	Dyogo Alves	9 January 2004 (aged 21)	2025	2026	Youth system		
Defenders
2	RB	(Uruguay)	Guillermo Varela	24 March 1993 (aged 32)	2022	2027	(Russia) Dynamo Moscow	Free	
3	CB	(Brazil)	Léo Ortiz	3 January 1996 (aged 29)	2024	2028	(Brazil) Red Bull Bragantino	€7.0m	
4	CB	(Brazil)	Léo Pereira	31 January 1996 (aged 29)	2020	2027	(Brazil) Athletico Paranaense	€6.1m	3rd Vice-captain
6	LB	(Brazil)	Ayrton Lucas	19 June 1997 (aged 28)	2022	2027	(Russia) Spartak Moscow	€7.0m	
13	CB	(Brazil)	Danilo	15 July 1991 (aged 34)	2025	2026	(Italy) Juventus FC	Free	
17	LB	(Uruguay)	Matías Viña	9 November 1997 (aged 28)	2024	2028	(Italy) AS Roma	€9.0m	
22	RB	(Brazil)	Emerson Royal	14 January 1999 (aged 26)	2025	2028	(Italy) AC Milan	€9.0m	
26	LB	(Brazil)	Alex Sandro	26 January 1991 (aged 34)	2024	2026	Free agent	Free	2nd Vice-captain
33	CB	(Brazil)	Cleiton	25 April 2003 (aged 22)	2021	2025	Youth system		
61	CB	(Brazil)	João Victor	1 January 2007 (aged 18)	2024	2025	Youth system		
	CB	(Brazil)	Pablo	21 June 1991 (aged 34)	2022	2025	(Russia) Lokomotiv Moscow	€2.5m	Not part of the main team
Midfielders
5	DM	(Chile)	Erick Pulgar	15 January 1994 (aged 31)	2022	2027	(Italy) Fiorentina	€3.0m	
8	CM	(Spain)	Saúl Ñíguez	21 November 1994 (aged 31)	2025	2028	(Spain) Atlético Madrid	Free	
10	AM	(Uruguay)	Giorgian de Arrascaeta	1 June 1994 (aged 31)	2019	2028	(Brazil) Cruzeiro	€15.0m	Vice-captain
15	AM	(Colombia)	Jorge Carrascal	25 May 1998 (aged 27)	2025	2029	(Russia) Dynamo Moscow	€12.0m	
18	CM	(Uruguay)	Nicolás de la Cruz	1 June 1997 (aged 28)	2024	2028	(Argentina) River Plate	€14.5m	
21	DM	(Italy)	Jorginho	20 December 1991 (aged 34)	2025	2028	(England) Arsenal	Free	
29	DM	(Brazil)	Allan	3 March 1997 (aged 28)	2023	2027	(Brazil) Atlético Mineiro	€8.2m	
52	DM	(Brazil)	Evertton Araújo	28 February 2003 (aged 22)	2024	2028	Youth system		
Forwards
7	RW	(Brazil)	Luiz Araújo	2 June 1996 (aged 29)	2023	2027	(United States) Atlanta United	€9.0m	
9	CF	(Brazil)	Pedro	20 June 1997 (aged 28)	2020	2027	(Italy) Fiorentina	€14.0m	
11	LW	(Brazil)	Everton	22 March 1996 (aged 29)	2022	2026	(Portugal) Benfica	€13.5m	
16	LW	(Brazil)	Samuel Lino	23 December 1999 (aged 26)	2025	2029	(Spain) Atlético Madrid	€22.0m	
23	CF	(Brazil)	Juninho	21 November 1996 (aged 29)	2025	2028	(Azerbaijan) Qarabağ FK	€5.0m	
27	LW	(Brazil)	Bruno Henrique	30 December 1990 (aged 35)	2019	2026	(Brazil) Santos	€5.4m	Captain
30	LW	(Brazil)	Michael	12 March 1996 (aged 29)	2024	2028	(Saudi Arabia) Al Hilal	Free	
50	RW	(Ecuador)	Gonzalo Plata	1 November 2000 (aged 25)	2024	2029	(Qatar) Al Sadd	€3.8m	
64	CF	(Brazil)	Wallace Yan	8 February 2005 (aged 20)	2025	2027	Youth system		

- - Currently injured

=== New contracts ===
No.	Pos.	Player	Date	Until	Source
5	MF	(Chile) Erick Pulgar	14 March 2025	31 December 2027	
8	MF	(Brazil) Gerson	8 April 2025	31 December 2030	
58	GK	(Brazil) Leonardo Nannetti	11 May 2025	31 December 2030	
79	MF	(Brazil) Joshua	11 May 2025	31 December 2030	
2	DF	(Uruguay) Guillermo Varela	15 August 2025	31 December 2027	
10	MF	(Uruguay) Giorgian de Arrascaeta	9 November 2025	31 December 2028	
77	DF	(Brazil) Johnny Góes	8 December 2025	31 December 2027	

== Transfers and loans ==
=== Transfers in ===
Pos.	Player	Transferred from	Fee	Date	Team	Source
FW	(Brazil) Thiaguinho	(Brazil) Treze	Loan return	1 January 2025	First Team	
DF	(Brazil) Pablo	(Brazil) Botafogo	Loan return	1 January 2025	First Team	
FW	(Brazil) Juninho	(Azerbaijan) Qarabağ FK	R$31m / €5m	15 January 2025	First Team	
DF	(Brazil) Danilo	(Italy) Juventus FC	Free	29 January 2025	First Team	
MF	(Italy) Jorginho	(England) Arsenal	Free	6 June 2025	First Team	
MF	(Brazil) Victor Hugo	(Turkey) Göztepe	Loan return	1 July 2025	First Team	
MF	(Spain) Saúl Ñíguez	(Spain) Atlético Madrid	Free	23 July 2025	First Team	
DF	(Brazil) Emerson Royal	(Italy) AC Milan	R$58.8m / €9m	26 July 2025	First Team	
FW	(Brazil) Samuel Lino	(Spain) Atlético Madrid	R$141.8m / €22m	29 July 2025	First Team	
MF	(Colombia) Jorge Carrascal	(Russia) Dynamo Moscow	R$77.1m / €12m	2 August 2025	First Team	
Total			R$308.7m / €48m			

=== Loan in ===
Pos.	Player	Loaned from	Fee	Start	End	Team	Source
MF	(Brazil) Bruno Xavier	(Brazil) Athletic Club	Free	14 April 2025	31 March 2026	Youth team	
Total			R$0m / €0m				

=== Transfers out ===
Pos.	Player	Transferred to	Fee	Date	Team	Source
GK	(Brazil) Hugo Souza	(Brazil) Corinthians	R$4.8m / €0.8m	1 January 2025	First Team	
DF	(Brazil) David Luiz	Free agent	End of contract	1 January 2025	First Team	
FW	(Brazil) Gabriel Barbosa	(Brazil) Cruzeiro	End of contract	1 January 2025	First Team	
DF	(Brazil) Fabrício Bruno	(Brazil) Cruzeiro	R$44m / €7m	11 January 2025	First Team	
FW	(Brazil) Thiaguinho	(Brazil) CRB	Free	7 February 2025	First Team	
DF	(Brazil) Lucyan	(Brazil) Bahia	Undisclosed	19 March 2025	Youth team	
DF	(Brazil) Ainoã	Free agent	Released	23 May 2025	Youth team	
DF	(Brazil) Wesley Juan	Free agent	Released	23 May 2025	Youth team	
FW	(Brazil) Felipe Lima	(Portugal) Alverca	Undisclosed	24 June 2025	Youth team	
DF	(Brazil) Darlan	(Brazil) Botafogo-SP	End of contract	30 June 2025	First Team	
MF	(Argentina) Carlos Alcaraz	(England) Everton	R$97.8m / €15m	1 July 2025	First Team	
MF	(Brazil) Gerson	(Russia) Zenit Saint Petersburg	R$160.8m / €25m	1 July 2025	First Team	
GK	(Brazil) Caio Barone	(Spain) Celta Vigo	Free	15 July 2025	Youth team	
DF	(Brazil) Zé Welinton	(United Arab Emirates) Al Dhafra	Free	23 July 2025	First Team	
DF	(Brazil) Wesley França	(Italy) AS Roma	R$163.4m / €25m	23 July 2025	First Team	
MF	(Brazil) Luís Aucélio	(Brazil) Vitória	Free	1 August 2025	Youth team	
MF	(Brazil) Kauan Menegatti	(Brazil) Athletico Paranaense	Free	1 August 2025	Youth team	
MF	(Brazil) Daniel Rogério	(Brazil) Vila Nova	Free	14 August 2025	Youth team	
MF	(Brazil) Matheus Gonçalves	(Saudi Arabia) Al-Ahli	R$50.5m / €8m	27 August 2025	First Team	
GK	(Brazil) Lucas Furtado	(Portugal) Vitória de Guimarães	Free	28 August 2025	Youth team	
FW	(Nigeria) Shola Ogundana	(Ukraine) Dinamo Kyiv	R$2.2m / €0.3m	29 August 2025	Youth team	
FW	(Brazil) Felipe Teresa	Free agent	Released	22 September 2025	Youth team	
MF	(Brazil) Fabiano	(Brazil) Audax	Loan Return	22 September 2025	Youth team	
Total			R$523.5m / €81.1m			

=== Loan out ===
Pos.	Player	Loaned to	Fee	Start	End	Team	Source
FW	(Brazil) Petterson	(Brazil) Juventude	Free	14 January 2025	31 December 2025	First Team	
FW	(Brazil) Carlinhos	(Brazil) Vitória	Free	30 January 2025	31 December 2025	First Team	
MF	(Argentina) Carlos Alcaraz	(England) Everton	Undisclosed	31 January 2025	30 June 2025	First Team	
MF	(Brazil) Caio Garcia	(Brazil) Botafogo-PB	Free	6 June 2025	31 December 2025	First Team	
MF	(Brazil) Rayan Lucas	(Portugal) Sporting	Undisclosed	27 June 2025	30 June 2026	First Team	
FW	(Brazil) Lorran	(Italy) Pisa SC	R$3.2m / €0.8m	28 August 2025	30 June 2026	First Team	
MF	(Brazil) Victor Hugo	(Brazil) Santos	Undisclosed	2 September 2025	31 July 2026	First Team	
Total			R$3.2m / €0.8m				

== Statistics ==
As of 17 December 2025

=== Manager records ===
Name	Nat	Record							
Name	Nat	G	W	D	L	GF	GA	GD	Win %
Filipe Luís	Brazil	73	48	16	9	132	43	+89	65.75
Cleber dos Santos (interim) (Note: Cleber dos Santos was in charge of a under-20 side in the first four 2025 Campeonato Carioca matches, as the main squad was traveling to play international friendly matches.)	Brazil	4	1	1	2	8	5	+3	25.00
Bruno Pivetti (interim) (Note: Bruno Pivetti was in charge of a under-20 side in the 2025 Campeonato Brasileiro Série A matchday 38, as the main squad was traveling to play the 2025 FIFA Intercontinental Cup in Qatar.)	Brazil	1	0	1	0	3	3	+0	0.00
Total		78	49	18	11	143	51	+92	62.82

=== Appearances ===
Source: Soccerway, FBRef

Players in italics have left the club before the end of the season.
^{†} Denotes two way player, youth and professional team.

No.	Pos.	Name	Série A		Copa do Brasil		Libertadores		Carioca		Other (Note: Includes Supercopa do Brasil, FIFA Club World Cup and FIFA Intercontinental Cup.)		Total		
No.	Pos.	Name	Starts	Subs	Starts	Subs	Starts	Subs	Starts	Subs	Starts	Subs	Starts	Subs	Apps
Goalkeepers
1	GK	(Argentina) Agustín Rossi	37	0	2	0	13	0	8	0	8	0	68	0	68
25	GK	(Brazil) Matheus Cunha	0	0	2	0	0	0	3	0	0	0	5	0	5
49	GK	(Brazil) Dyogo Alves	1	0	0	0	0	0	4	0	0	0	5	0	5
58	GK	(Brazil) Leonardo Nannetti^{†}	0	0	0	0	—	—	—	—	—	—	0	0	0
84	GK	(Brazil) Gabriel Werneck^{†}	0	0	—	—	—	—	—	—	—	—	0	0	0
Defenders
2	RB	(Uruguay) Guillermo Varela	14	6	4	0	8	4	6	3	5	1	37	14	51
3	CB	(Brazil) Léo Ortiz	26	0	2	0	10	1	8	1	6	0	52	2	54
4	CB	(Brazil) Léo Pereira	33	1	2	0	12	0	8	0	7	0	62	1	63
6	LB	(Brazil) Ayrton Lucas	13	5	3	1	4	3	2	3	2	2	24	14	38
13	CB	(Brazil) Danilo	14	6	2	0	5	1	4	0	3	1	28	8	36
17	LB	(Uruguay) Matías Viña	2	6	1	0	0	0	—	—	0	1	2	7	10
22	RB	(Brazil) Emerson Royal	13	1	0	1	1	2	—	—	0	0	14	4	18
26	LB	(Brazil) Alex Sandro	19	1	0	0	9	1	4	1	6	0	38	3	41
33	CB	(Brazil) Cleiton	0	2	0	0	0	0	5	0	0	0	5	2	7
41	CB	(Brazil) João Pedro Da Mata^{†}	—	—	—	—	—	—	0	1	—	—	0	1	1
44	CB	(Brazil) João Victor Carbone^{†}	—	—	—	—	—	—	0	0	—	—	0	0	0
51	RB	(Brazil) Daniel Sales^{†}	1	0	—	—	0	0	5	1	—	—	6	1	7
57	CB	(Brazil) Iago Teodoro^{†}	1	0	—	—	—	—	0	0	—	—	1	0	1
61	CB	(Brazil) João Victor^{†}	3	1	1	0	0	1	1	1	0	0	5	3	8
63	LB	(Brazil) Felipe Vieira^{†}	—	—	—	—	—	—	1	0	—	—	1	0	1
74	RB	(Brazil) Gusttavo^{†}	—	—	—	—	—	—	0	0	—	—	0	0	0
76	RB	(Brazil) Wanderson^{†}	0	1	—	—	—	—	0	0	—	—	0	1	1
77	CB	(Brazil) Johnny Góes^{†}	1	0	—	—	—	—	0	0	—	—	1	0	1
78	CB	(Brazil) Pedro Fachinetti^{†}	0	0	—	—	—	—	–	–	—	—	0	0	0
83	CB	(Brazil) Yago Melo^{†}	0	0	—	—	—	—	–	–	—	—	0	0	0
	CB	(Brazil) Pablo	—	—	—	—	—	—	4	0	—	—	4	0	4
Midfielders
5	DM	(Chile) Erick Pulgar	15	2	0	0	6	1	8	1	7	0	36	4	40
8	MF	(Spain) Saúl Ñíguez	12	4	0	2	3	1	—	—	0	2	15	9	24
10	AM	(Uruguay) Giorgian de Arrascaeta	30	3	0	2	11	0	8	2	7	1	56	8	64
15	AM	(Colombia) Jorge Carrascal	11	5	—	—	3	2	—	—	3	0	17	7	24
18	CM	(Uruguay) Nicolás de la Cruz	12	7	—	—	5	0	5	0	1	4	23	11	34
21	DM	(Italy) Jorginho	15	3	1	0	6	0	—	—	6	1	28	4	32
29	DM	(Brazil) Allan	9	4	2	0	2	3	3	7	1	2	18	15	33
52	CM	(Brazil) Evertton Araújo	10	8	4	0	2	4	4	2	1	1	21	15	36
56	CM	(Brazil) Pablo Lúcio^{†}	1	0	—	—	—	—	0	1	—	—	1	1	2
60	CM	(Brazil) João Alves^{†}	0	0	0	1	0	0	0	4	—	—	0	5	5
66	AM	(Brazil) Bruno Xavier^{†}	0	0	—	—	—	—	–	–	—	—	0	0	0
72	CM	(Brazil) Lucas Vieira^{†}	0	1	—	—	—	—	0	0	—	—	0	1	1
75	CM	(Brazil) Luiz Felipe^{†}	—	—	—	—	—	—	0	0	—	—	0	0	0
79	AM	(Brazil) Joshua^{†}	0	1	0	1	0	0	—	—	—	—	0	2	2
Forwards
7	RW	(Brazil) Luiz Araújo	15	20	2	0	6	7	5	5	4	4	32	36	68
9	CF	(Brazil) Pedro	13	8	3	0	5	5	—	—	2	3	23	16	39
11	LW	(Brazil) Everton	9	14	2	1	1	5	4	2	2	3	19	23	42
16	LW	(Brazil) Samuel Lino	19	2	0	2	5	1	—	—	1	1	25	6	31
23	CF	(Brazil) Juninho	2	13	0	2	2	3	3	5	0	2	7	25	32
27	LW	(Brazil) Bruno Henrique	20	12	1	0	8	5	6	1	4	4	39	22	61
30	LW	(Brazil) Michael	7	8	2	0	3	0	3	2	1	3	17	12	29
47	CF	(Brazil) Guilherme Gomes^{†}	1	0	—	—	—	—	4	2	—	—	5	2	7
50	RW	(Ecuador) Gonzalo Plata	14	14	3	0	6	1	8	0	5	2	36	17	53
64	CF	(Brazil) Wallace Yan^{†}	4	13	1	1	0	4	1	6	0	3	6	27	33
67	CF	(Brazil) Rafael Couto^{†}	—	—	—	—	—	—	0	1	—	—	0	1	1
69	CF	(Brazil) Guilherme Santos^{†}	—	—	—	—	—	—	0	1	—	—	0	1	1
80	CF	(Brazil) João Camargo^{†}	0	1	—	—	—	—	–	–	—	—	0	1	1
81	CF	(Brazil) Douglas Telles^{†}	1	1	—	—	—	—	–	–	—	—	1	1	2
Player(s) transferred out during the season
8	CM	(Brazil) Gerson	9	0	1	1	4	1	8	0	4	0	26	2	28
19	RW	(Brazil) Lorran^{†}	0	0	0	1	—	—	4	0	—	—	4	1	5
20	AM	(Brazil) Matheus Gonçalves^{†}	0	4	2	1	0	1	2	5	0	0	4	11	15
22	CM	(Argentina) Carlos Alcaraz	—	—	—	—	—	—	1	0	—	—	1	0	1
24	GK	(Brazil) Lucas Furtado^{†}	—	—	—	—	—	—	0	0	—	—	0	0	0
28	CF	(Brazil) Carlinhos	—	—	—	—	—	—	4	0	—	—	4	0	4
28	CM	(Brazil) Victor Hugo	0	1	—	—	—	—	–	–	—	—	0	1	1
32	LW	(Brazil) Thiaguinho	—	—	—	—	—	—	3	0	—	—	3	0	3
35	CM	(Brazil) Rayan Lucas^{†}	—	—	—	—	—	—	4	0	—	—	4	0	4
39	LB	(Brazil) Zé Welinton	—	—	—	—	—	—	4	0	—	—	4	0	4
40	CF	(Brazil) Felipe Teresa^{†}	—	—	—	—	—	—	0	4	—	—	0	4	4
42	DM	(Brazil) Fabiano^{†}	—	—	—	—	—	—	4	0	—	—	4	0	4
43	RB	(Brazil) Wesley França	11	0	0	1	4	1	8	0	3	0	26	2	28
53	RB	(Brazil) Lucyan^{†}	—	—	—	—	—	—	0	0	—	—	0	0	0
54	LW	(Nigeria) Shola Ogundana^{†}	0	0	—	—	—	—	0	4	—	—	0	4	4
55	CM	(Brazil) Caio Garcia	—	—	—	—	—	—	0	1	—	—	0	1	1
62	DM	(Brazil) Daniel Rogério^{†}	—	—	—	—	—	—	0	1	—	—	0	1	1
70	LB	(Brazil) Ainoã^{†}	—	—	—	—	—	—	0	1	—	—	0	1	1
73	CB	(Brazil) Wesley Juan^{†}	—	—	—	—	—	—	0	0	—	—	0	0	0

=== Goalscorers ===
Rank	Pos.	No.	Player	Série A	Copa do Brasil	Libertadores	Carioca	Other (Note: Includes Supercopa do Brasil, FIFA Club World Cup and FIFA Intercontinental Cup.)	Total
1	MF	10	(Uruguay) Giorgian de Arrascaeta	18	0	2	2	3	25
2	FW	9	(Brazil) Pedro	12	1	2	0	0	15
2	FW	27	(Brazil) Bruno Henrique	8	0	1	3	3	15
4	FW	7	(Brazil) Luiz Araújo	7	0	1	3	2	13
5	FW	64	(Brazil) Wallace Yan	1	0	0	4	2	7
6	DF	4	(Brazil) Léo Pereira	4	0	1	0	1	6
7	DF	13	(Brazil) Danilo	1	1	1	0	2	5
7	MF	21	(Italy) Jorginho	3	0	0	0	2	5
7	FW	50	(Ecuador) Gonzalo Plata	4	0	0	1	0	5
10	DF	3	(Brazil) Léo Ortiz	1	0	1	2	0	4
10	FW	11	(Brazil) Everton	1	2	0	1	0	4
10	FW	16	(Brazil) Samuel Lino	4	0	0	0	0	4
10	FW	23	(Brazil) Juninho	1	0	1	2	0	4
14	FW	28	(Brazil) Carlinhos	0	0	0	3	0	3
14	FW	47	(Brazil) Guilherme Gomes	2	0	0	1	0	3
16	DF	2	(Uruguay) Guillermo Varela	0	1	1	0	0	2
16	DF	6	(Brazil) Ayrton Lucas	2	0	0	0	0	2
16	MF	8	(Brazil) Gerson	0	0	0	1	1	2
16	MF	15	(Colombia) Jorge Carrascal	2	0	0	0	0	2
16	MF	20	(Brazil) Matheus Gonçalves	0	0	0	2	0	2
16	FW	30	(Brazil) Michael	1	0	0	1	0	2
16	DF	43	(Brazil) Wesley França	1	0	0	1	0	2
16	FW	81	(Brazil) Douglas Telles	2	0	0	0	0	2
24	MF	5	(Chile) Erick Pulgar	1	0	0	0	0	1
24	MF	18	(Uruguay) Nicolás de la Cruz	0	0	1	0	0	1
24	MF	22	(Argentina) Carlos Alcaraz	0	0	0	1	0	1
24	DF	22	(Brazil) Emerson Royal	1	0	0	0	0	1
24	FW	32	(Brazil) Thiaguinho	0	0	0	1	0	1
24	FW	40	(Brazil) Felipe Teresa	0	0	0	1	0	1
24	MF	52	(Brazil) Evertton Araújo	1	0	0	0	0	1
24	MF	79	(Brazil) Joshua	0	1	0	0	0	1
Own Goal(s)				0	0	1	0	0	1
Total				78	6	13	30	16	143

=== Penalty kicks ===
Includes only penalty kicks taken during matches.

Rank	Pos.	No.	Player	Série A	Copa do Brasil	Libertadores	Carioca	Other (Note: Includes Supercopa do Brasil, FIFA Club World Cup and FIFA Intercontinental Cup.)	Total
1	MF	21	(Italy) Jorginho	3 / 3	0 / 0	0 / 0	0 / 0	2 / 2	5 / 5
2	FW	27	(Brazil) Bruno Henrique	1 / 1	0 / 0	0 / 0	1 / 1	1 / 1	3 / 3
2	MF	10	(Uruguay) Giorgian de Arrascaeta	2 / 3	0 / 0	0 / 0	1 / 1	0 / 0	3 / 4
4	FW	9	(Brazil) Pedro	1 / 2	0 / 0	0 / 0	0 / 0	0 / 0	1 / 2
Total				7 / 9	0 / 0	0 / 0	2 / 2	3 / 3	12 / 14

=== Assists ===
Rank	Pos.	No.	Player	Série A	Copa do Brasil	Libertadores	Carioca	Other (Note: Includes Supercopa do Brasil, FIFA Club World Cup and FIFA Intercontinental Cup.)	Total
1	MF	10	(Uruguay) Giorgian de Arrascaeta	14	0	1	2	3	20
2	FW	7	(Brazil) Luiz Araújo	3	0	3	2	1	9
2	FW	50	(Ecuador) Gonzalo Plata	1	1	2	3	2	9
4	FW	9	(Brazil) Pedro	6	1	0	0	0	7
5	DF	2	(Uruguay) Guillermo Varela	4	1	0	0	0	5
5	MF	15	(Colombia) Jorge Carrascal	5	0	0	0	0	5
5	FW	16	(Brazil) Samuel Lino	5	0	0	0	0	5
8	MF	8	(Brazil) Gerson	2	0	1	1	0	4
8	FW	11	(Brazil) Everton	3	1	0	0	0	4
8	FW	30	(Brazil) Michael	3	0	0	0	1	4
8	FW	64	(Brazil) Wallace Yan	2	0	0	2	0	4
12	MF	21	(Italy) Jorginho	1	0	0	0	2	3
12	DF	43	(Brazil) Wesley França	2	0	0	1	0	3
12	FW	47	(Brazil) Guilherme Gomes	0	0	0	3	0	3
15	DF	3	(Brazil) Léo Ortiz	2	0	0	0	0	2
15	MF	8	(Spain) Saúl	2	0	0	0	0	2
15	DF	13	(Brazil) Danilo	1	0	0	1	0	2
15	FW	27	(Brazil) Bruno Henrique	0	0	1	0	1	2
19	DF	4	(Brazil) Léo Pereira	0	0	1	0	0	1
19	DF	6	(Brazil) Ayrton Lucas	0	1	0	0	0	1
19	DF	22	(Brazil) Emerson Royal	1	0	0	0	0	1
19	FW	40	(Brazil) Felipe Teresa	0	0	0	1	0	1
19	DF	51	(Brazil) Daniel Sales	0	0	0	1	0	1
19	DF	51	(Brazil) Johnny Góes	1	0	0	0	0	1
Total				58	5	9	17	10	98

=== Clean sheets ===
Rank	No.	Player	Série A	Copa do Brasil	Libertadores	Carioca	Other (Note: Includes Supercopa do Brasil, FIFA Club World Cup and FIFA Intercontinental Cup.)	Total
1	1	(Argentina) Agustín Rossi	18 / 37	1 / 2	9 / 13	6 / 8	2 / 8	36 / 68
2	25	(Brazil) Matheus Cunha	0 / 0	1 / 2	0 / 0	3 / 3	0 / 0	4 / 5
3	49	(Brazil) Dyogo Alves	0 / 1	0 / 0	0 / 0	1 / 4	0 / 0	1 / 5
Total			18 / 38	2 / 4	9 / 13	10 / 15	2 / 8	41 / 78

=== Penalty kick saves ===
Includes only penalty kicks saves during matches.

Rank	No.	Player	Série A	Copa do Brasil	Libertadores	Carioca	Other (Note: Includes Supercopa do Brasil, FIFA Club World Cup and FIFA Intercontinental Cup.)	Total
1	1	(Argentina) Agustín Rossi	3 / 4	0 / 0	0 / 1	0 / 0	0 / 0	3 / 5
2	25	(Brazil) Matheus Cunha	0 / 0	0 / 0	0 / 0	0 / 0	0 / 0	0 / 0
2	49	(Brazil) Dyogo Alves	0 / 0	0 / 0	0 / 0	0 / 0	0 / 0	0 / 0
Total			3 / 4	0 / 0	0 / 1	0 / 0	0 / 0	3 / 5

=== Season records ===
==== Individual ====
- Most matches played in the season in all competitions: 68 – Agustín Rossi and Luiz Araújo
- Most League matches played in the season: 37 – Agustín Rossi
- Most matches played as starter in the season in all competitions: 68 – Agustín Rossi
- Most League matches played as starter in the season: 37 – Agustín Rossi
- Most matches played as substitute in the season in all competitions: 36 – Luiz Araújo
- Most League matches played as substitute in the season: 20 – Luiz Araújo
- Most goals in the season in all competitions: 25 – Giorgian de Arrascaeta
- Most League goals in the season: 18 – Giorgian de Arrascaeta
- Most clean sheets in the season in all competitions: 36 – Agustín Rossi
- Most League clean sheets in the season: 18 – Agustín Rossi
- Most goals scored in a match: 3
  - Pedro vs Vitória, Série A, 25 August 2025
- Goals in consecutive matches in all competitions: 4
  - Giorgian de Arrascaeta, 20 August 2025 to 14 September 2025
- Goals in consecutive League matches: 3
  - Giorgian de Arrascaeta, 6 April 2025 to 16 April 2025
  - Giorgian de Arrascaeta, 27 April 2025 to 10 May 2025
  - Luiz Araújo, 1 June 2025 to 12 July 2025
  - Giorgian de Arrascaeta, 25 August 2025 to 14 September 2025
- Fastest goal: 15 seconds
  - Pedro vs Estudiantes de La Plata, Copa Libertadores, 18 September 2025
- Hat-tricks: 1
  - Pedro vs Vitória, Série A, 25 August 2025
- Oldest goalscorer: Bruno Henrique – 34 years, 330 days (vs Atlético Mineiro, Série A, 25 November 2025)
- Youngest goalscorer: Joshua – 17 years, 340 days (vs Botafogo-PB, Copa do Brasil, 1 May 2025)
- Most assists in the season in all competitions: 20 – Giorgian de Arrascaeta
- Most League assists in the season: 14 – Giorgian de Arrascaeta
- Most assists in a match: 3
  - Samuel Lino vs Vitória, Série A, 25 August 2025
- Assists in consecutive matches in all competitions: 2
  - Guilherme Gomes, 19 January 2025 to 22 January 2025
  - Gerson, 4 May 2025 to 7 May 2025
  - Gonzalo Plata, 3 August 2025 to 6 August 2025
  - Pedro, 25 August 2025 to 31 August 2025
  - Pedro, 15 October 2025 to 19 October 2025
  - Giorgian de Arrascaeta, 15 October 2025 to 19 October 2025
- Assists in consecutive League matches: 3
  - Giorgian de Arrascaeta, 9 August 2025 to 25 August 2025

==== Team ====
- Biggest home win in all competitions:
  - 8–0 vs Vitória, Série A, 25 August 2025
- Biggest League home win:
  - 8–0 vs Vitória, Série A, 25 August 2025
- Biggest away win in all competitions:
  - 5–0 vs Bangu, Campeonato Carioca, 22 January 2025
  - 5–0 vs Portuguesa, Campeonato Carioca, 5 February 2025
- Biggest League away win:
  - 3–0 vs Botafogo, Série A, 15 October 2025
- Biggest home loss in all competitions:
  - 1–2 vs Boavista, Campeonato Carioca, 12 January 2025
  - 1–2 vs Nova Iguaçu, Campeonato Carioca, 19 January 2025
  - 1–2 vs Central Córdoba, Copa Libertadores, 9 April 2025
  - 0–1 vs Atlético Mineiro, Copa do Brasil, 31 July 2025
- Biggest League home loss:
  - No losses
- Biggest away loss in all competitions:
  - 1–2 vs Cruzeiro, Série A, 4 May 2025
  - 0–1 vs Santos, Série A, 16 July 2025
  - 0–1 vs Estudiantes de La Plata, Copa Libertadores, 25 September 2025
  - 0–1 vs Bahia, Série A, 5 October 2025
  - 0–1 vs Fortaleza, Série A, 25 October 2025
  - 1–2 vs Fluminense, Série A, 19 November 2025
- Biggest League away loss:
  - 1–2 vs Cruzeiro, Série A, 4 May 2025
  - 0–1 vs Santos, Série A, 16 July 2025
  - 0–1 vs Bahia, Série A, 5 October 2025
  - 0–1 vs Fortaleza, Série A, 25 October 2025
  - 1–2 vs Fluminense, Série A, 19 November 2025
- Highest scoring match in all competitions:
  - 8–0 vs Vitória, Série A, 25 August 2025
- Highest scoring League match:
  - 8–0 vs Vitória, Série A, 25 August 2025
- Longest winning run in all competitions: 6 consecutive match(es)
  - 12 February 2025 to 12 March 2025
  - 13 April 2025 to 1 May 2025
  - 21 May 2025 to 20 June 2025
  - 6 August 2025 to 25 August 2025
- Longest League winning run: 3 consecutive match(es)
  - 6 April 2025 to 16 April 2025
  - 25 May 2025 to 12 July 2025
  - 20 July 2025 to 27 July 2025
  - 9 August 2025 to 25 August 2025
- Longest unbeaten run in all competitions: 16 consecutive match(es)
  - 22 January 2025 to 6 April 2025
- Longest League unbeaten run: 12 consecutive match(es)
  - 20 July 2025 to 2 October 2025
- Longest losing run in all competitions: 1 consecutive match(es)
  - 12 January 2025
  - 19 January 2025
  - 9 April 2025
  - 4 May 2025
  - 29 June 2025
  - 16 July 2025
  - 31 July 2025
  - 25 September 2025
  - 5 October 2025
  - 25 October 2025
  - 19 November 2025
- Longest League losing run: 1 consecutive match(es)
  - 4 May 2025
  - 16 July 2025
  - 5 October 2025
  - 25 October 2025
  - 19 November 2025
- Longest without win run in all competitions: 3 consecutive match(es)
  - 12 January 2025 to 19 January 2025
- Longest without League win run: 2 consecutive match(es)
  - 2 October 2025 to 5 October 2025
- Longest scoring run in all competitions: 11 consecutive match(es)
  - 3 August 2025 to 21 September 2025
- Longest League scoring run: 11 consecutive match(es)
  - 20 July 2025 to 28 September 2025
- Longest without scoring run in all competitions: 2 consecutive match(es)
  - 19 April 2025 to 22 April 2025
  - 2 October 2025 to 5 October 2025
  - 25 October 2025 to 29 October 2025
- Longest League without scoring run: 2 consecutive match(es)
  - 2 October 2025 to 5 October 2025
- Longest conceding goals run in all competitions: 4 consecutive match(es)
  - 18 September 2025 to 28 September 2025
  - 5 November 2025 to 19 November 2025
- Longest League conceding goals run: 4 consecutive match(es)
  - 5 November 2025 to 19 November 2025
- Longest without conceding goals run in all competitions: 6 consecutive match(es)
  - 5 February 2025 to 1 March 2025
  - 13 April 2025 to 1 May 2025
- Longest League without conceding goals run: 5 consecutive match(es)
  - 10 May 2025 to 12 July 2025

=== National Team statistics ===
As of 18 November 2025

Appearances and goals while playing for Flamengo, includes only FIFA matches.

No.	Pos.	Name	Nat. Team	Friendlies		FWC Qualifiers		Total	
No.	Pos.	Name	Nat. Team	Apps	Goals	Apps	Goals	Apps	Goals
2	DF	Guillermo Varela	Uruguay	1	0	4	0	5	0
3	DF	Léo Ortiz	Brazil	—		2	0	2	0
8	MF	Gerson	Brazil	—		3	0	3	0
10	MF	Giorgian de Arrascaeta	Uruguay	1	1	4	2	5	3
13	DF	Danilo	Brazil	1	0	1	0	2	0
15	MF	Jorge Carrascal	Colombia	2	0	0	0	2	0
16	FW	Samuel Lino	Brazil	—		1	0	1	0
17	DF	Matías Viña	Uruguay	1	0	1	0	2	0
18	MF	Nicolás de la Cruz	Uruguay	—		1	0	1	0
26	DF	Alex Sandro	Brazil	1	0	2	0	3	0
43	DF	Wesley França	Brazil	—		2	0	2	0
50	FW	Gonzalo Plata	Ecuador	2	0	4	0	6	0

=== Attendance ===
Includes all competition home matches in the 2024 season. Attendances recorded represent actual gate attendance, not paid attendance.

Campeonato Carioca
Stadium	Matches	Average	Highest attendance	Lowest attendance
Maracanã	6	42,083	69,393	20,455
Batistão	1	3,793	3,793	3,793
Castelão	1	4,696	4,696	4,696
Total	8	32,623	260,985	
Copa do Brasil
Stadium	Matches	Average	Highest attendance	Lowest attendance
Maracanã	2	45,248	64,681	25,814
Total	2	45,248	90,495	
Copa Libertadores
Stadium	Matches	Average	Highest attendance	Lowest attendance
Maracanã	6	66,771	71,977	56,515
Total	6	66,771	400,626	
Série A
Stadium	Matches	Average	Highest attendance	Lowest attendance
Maracanã	19	62,548	73,244	31,445
Total	19	62,548	1,188,406	
Season total	35	55,443	1,940,512	

== Individual awards ==
Name	Position	Nat.	Award
Agustín Rossi	GK	(Argentina)	Campeonato Carioca Team of the Season; Campeonato Brasileiro Goalkeeper of the Month: May; Campeonato Brasileiro Goalkeeper of the Month: July; Campeonato Brasileiro Goalkeeper of the Month: September; Campeonato Brasileiro Goalkeeper of the Month: October; Campeonato Brasileiro Goalkeeper of the Month: November; CONMEBOL Libertadores Team of the Season; Campeonato Brasileiro Série A Team of the Year: 2025
Wesley França	DF	(Brazil)	Campeonato Carioca Team of the Season
Léo Ortiz	DF	(Brazil)	Campeonato Carioca Team of the Season
Léo Pereira	DF	(Brazil)	Campeonato Carioca Team of the Season; CONMEBOL Libertadores Team of the Season; Bola de Prata
Danilo	DF	(Brazil)	CONMEBOL Libertadores Team of the Season
Erick Pulgar	MF	(Chile)	Campeonato Carioca Team of the Season; CONMEBOL Libertadores Team of the Season
Gerson	MF	(Brazil)	Campeonato Carioca Team of the Season; Campeonato Carioca Best Player
Jorginho	MF	(Italy)	Campeonato Brasileiro Série A Team of the Year: 2025
Giorgian de Arrascaeta	MF	(Uruguay)	Campeonato Brasileiro Player of the Month: April; Campeonato Brasileiro Player of the Month: August; Campeonato Brasileiro Player of the Month: November; CONMEBOL Libertadores Team of the Season; CONMEBOL Libertadores Player of the Tournament; Bola de Prata; Bola de Ouro; Campeonato Brasileiro Série A Team of the Year: 2025
Jorge Carrascal	MF	(Colombia)	CONMEBOL Libertadores Team of the Season
Bruno Henrique	FW	(Brazil)	Campeonato Carioca Team of the Season
Pedro	FW	(Brazil)	CONMEBOL Libertadores Team of the Season
Filipe Luís	HC	(Brazil)	Campeonato Carioca Head Coach of the Season
