= Wallace Yan =

Brazilian footballer

Personal information
- Full name: Wallace Yan de Souza Barreto
- Date of birth: 8 February 2005 (age 21)
- Place of birth: Rio de Janeiro, Brasil
- Height: 1.82 m (6 ft 0 in)
- Position: Forward

Team information
- Current team: Red Bull Bragantino
- Number: 47

Youth career
- 2021–2022: Ferroviária
- 2022: → Flamengo (loan)
- 2023–2025: Flamengo

Senior career*
Years	Team	Apps	(Gls)
2024–2026	Flamengo	37	(5)
2026–	Red Bull Bragantino	9	(3)
- * Club domestic league appearances and goals as of 14:44, 10 November 2026 (UTC)

Wallace Yan de Souza Barreto (born 8 February 2005), known as Wallace Yan, is a Brazilian professional footballer who plays as a forward for Campeonato Brasileiro Série A club Red Bull Bragantino.

== Club career ==
=== Flamengo ===
Born in Realengo, a neighborhood in Rio de Janeiro, Wallace Yan began his career with Ferroviária, but was loaned to Flamengo in June 2022. He later signed a permanent deal with the club in February 2023, and helped the under-20 side to win the 2024 U-20 Copa Libertadores (being the top scorer of the competition) and the 2024 Under-20 Intercontinental Cup.

Wallace Yan made his first team debut on 27 January 2024, coming on as a late substitute for Petterson in a 0–0 Campeonato Carioca away draw against Portuguesa-RJ. His Série A debut occurred on 22 September, as he replaced fellow youth graduate Lorran in a 3–2 away loss to Grêmio, as head coach Tite opted to line up several reserve players.

Wallace Yan started the 2025 season by scoring four goals in his first five matches, which saw him establish a place in the first team squad. In July, after scoring twice in the 2025 FIFA Club World Cup, he received a pay rise from the club, but ended the year behind Pedro, Bruno Henrique and Gonzalo Plata in the pecking order.

In August 2026, after 14 goalless appearances in the year, Wallace Yan was deemed surplus to requirements at Fla.

=== Red Bull Bragantino ===
On 2 September 2026, Red Bull Bragantino announced the signing of Wallace Yan on a contract until 2031, for a rumoured fee of € 6 million for 70% of his economic rights plus Juliano moving in the opposite direction. He scored his first goals for the club on 28 October, netting a brace in a 3–0 home win over Chapecoense.

== International career ==
In June 2024, Wallace Yan was called up to the Brazil national under-20 team for a period of trainings.

== Career statistics ==
As of 10 November 2026

Appearances and goals by club, season and competition
Club	Season	League			State league		National cup		Continental		Other		Total	
Club	Season	Division	Apps	Goals	Apps	Goals	Apps	Goals	Apps	Goals	Apps	Goals	Apps	Goals
Flamengo	2024	Série A	1	0	1	0	—		0	0	—		2	0
Flamengo	2025	Série A	17	1	7	4	2	0	4 (Note: Appearances in Copa Libertadores)	0	3 (Note: Appearances in FIFA Club World Cup)	2	33	7
Flamengo	2026	Série A	7	0	4	0	1	0	2	0	0	0	14	0
Flamengo	Total		25	1	12	4	3	0	6	0	3	2	49	7
Red Bull Bragantino	2026	Série A	9	3	—		—		—		—		9	3
Career total			34	4	12	4	3	0	6	0	3	2	58	10

== Honours ==
Flamengo U20

- U-20 Copa Libertadores: 2024
- Under-20 Intercontinental Cup: 2024

Flamengo

- Copa Libertadores: 2025
- Campeonato Brasileiro Série A: 2025
- Copa do Brasil: 2024
- Supercopa do Brasil: 2025
- Campeonato Carioca: 2024, 2025, 2026
