= Douglas Telles =

Brazilian footballer (born 2007)

Personal information
- Full name: Douglas Costa Telles
- Date of birth: 1 June 2007 (age 19)
- Place of birth: Rio de Janeiro, Brasil
- Height: 1.77 m (5 ft 10 in)
- Position: Forward

Team information
- Current team: Flamengo
- Number: 81

Youth career
- Barra Futsal (futsal)
- 2021–: Flamengo

Senior career*
Years	Team	Apps	(Gls)
2025–	Flamengo	6	(3)
- * Club domestic league appearances and goals as of 15:51, 19 November 2025 (UTC)

Douglas Costa Telles (born 1 June 2007), known as Douglas Telles, is a Brazilian professional footballer who plays as a forward for Flamengo.

== Career ==
Born in Rio de Janeiro, Douglas Telles joined Flamengo's youth sides in 2021, after playing futsal for Barra Futsal. On 18 October 2023, he signed his first professional contract with the club, agreeing to a three-year deal.

After impressing in the under-17s and under-20s, Douglas Telles made his first team – and Série A – debut on 15 November 2025; after coming on as a late substitute for Bruno Henrique, he scored his side's fifth in a 5–1 away routing of Sport Recife with just 47 seconds on the field.

== Career statistics ==
As of 19 November 2025

Club	Season	League			State League		Cup		Continental		Other		Total	
Club	Season	Division	Apps	Goals	Apps	Goals	Apps	Goals	Apps	Goals	Apps	Goals	Apps	Goals
Flamengo	2025	Série A	1	1	0	0	0	0	0	0	—		1	1
Career total			1	1	0	0	0	0	0	0	0	0	1	1

== Honours ==
Flamengo U20

- Under-20 Intercontinental Cup: 2025
- U-20 Copa Libertadores: 2025

Flamengo

- Campeonato Brasileiro Série A: 2025
