= Felipe Teresa =

Brazilian footballer (born 2006)

Personal information
- Full name: Felipe Gabriel Cunha Teresa
- Date of birth: 2 January 2006 (age 20)
- Place of birth: Guaraqueçaba, Brasil
- Position: Forward

Team information
- Current team: Palmeiras

Youth career
- 2021: Independente de Limeira
- 2022–2023: Azuriz
- 2022–2023: → Flamengo (loan)
- 2023–2025: Flamengo
- 2025–: Palmeiras

Senior career*
Years	Team	Apps	(Gls)
2024–2025	Flamengo	1	(1)
- * Club domestic league appearances and goals as of 17:08, 24 October 2024 (UTC)

Felipe Gabriel Cunha Teresa (born 2 January 2006), known as Felipe Teresa, is a Brazilian professional footballer who plays as a forward for Palmeiras U-20.

== Career ==
Born in Guaraqueçaba, Paraná, Felipe Teresa had a number of failed trials at several clubs before joining the under-15 side of Independente de Limeira. After being the club's top scorer in the category's Campeonato Paulista, he spent a period training at Azuriz before joining Flamengo's youth sides in 2022. Initially on loan, he subsequently signed a permanent deal with the club, and helped the under-20 side to win the 2024 U-20 Copa Libertadores and the 2024 Under-20 Intercontinental Cup, scoring the winning goal in the latter.

=== Flamengo ===
Felipe Teresa made his first team – and Série A – debut on 22 September 2024; after coming on as a late substitute for Carlos Alcaraz, he scored Fla's second goal in a 3–2 away loss to Grêmio, as head coach Tite opted to line up several reserve players.

== Career statistics ==
As of 23 December 2025

Club	Season	League			State League		Cup		Continental		Other		Total	
Club	Season	Division	Apps	Goals	Apps	Goals	Apps	Goals	Apps	Goals	Apps	Goals	Apps	Goals
Flamengo	2024	Série A	1	1	0	0	0	0	0	0	—		1	1
Flamengo	2025	Série A	—		4	1	—		—		—		4	1
Flamengo	Total		1	1	4	1	0	0	0	0	0	0	5	2
Career total			1	1	4	1	0	0	0	0	0	0	5	2

== Honours ==
=== Youth ===
Flamengo

- Under-20 Intercontinental Cup: 2024, 2025
- U-20 Copa Libertadores: 2024, 2025

=== Professional ===
Flamengo

- Campeonato Carioca: 2025
