= Matheus Gonçalves =

Brazilian footballer

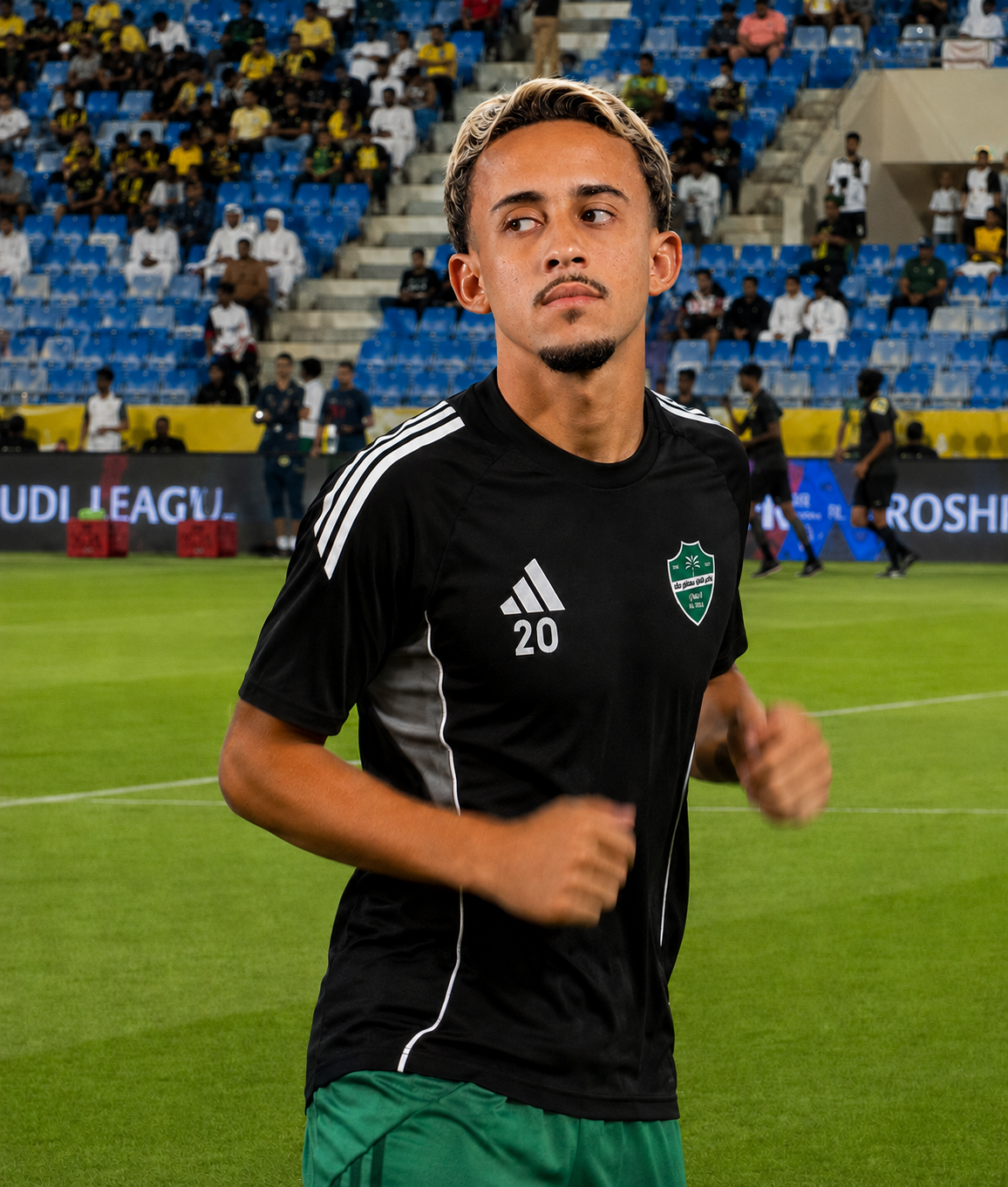
- Matheus with Al-Ahli in 2026

Personal information
- Full name: Matheus Gonçalves Martins
- Date of birth: 18 August 2005 (age 21)
- Place of birth: Rio de Janeiro, Brazil
- Height: 1.75 m (5 ft 9 in)
- Position: Attacking midfielder

Team information
- Current team: Al-Ahli
- Number: 20

Youth career
- 2018–2025: Flamengo

Senior career*
Years	Team	Apps	(Gls)
2022–2025	Flamengo	20	(2)
2023	→ Red Bull Bragantino (loan)	12	(0)
2025–	Al-Ahli	26	(2)
- * Club domestic league appearances and goals as of 30 October 2026

Matheus Gonçalves (born 18 August 2005) commonly known as Matee, is a Brazilian professional footballer who plays as an attacking midfielder for Saudi Pro League club Al Ahli.

In September 2022, he was named by English newspaper The Guardian as one of the best players born in 2005 worldwide.

== Club career ==
=== Flamengo ===
Matheus Gonçalves signed for Flamengo at the age of twelve, progressing through the youth ranks and signing his first professional contract in August 2021. He played 5 games and scored in the state trophy against Botafogo.

==== Red Bragantino (loan) ====
On 26 July 2023, Gonçalves signed on loan with Red Bull Bragantino until 31 December 2023. On 11 August 2023, he played his first game, coming off the bench in the 2023 Copa Sudamericana Round of 16 second leg match against América Mineiro. Few weeks later, on 27 August 2023, Gonçalves made his first assist for Red Bull Bragantino in a Campeonato Brasileiro Série A 2–0 win against Cuiabá. On October 19, Matheus suffered a penalty in a game against Santos, Eduardo Sasha scored It to make the game 2–0. He Played his last game against Coritiba, where he received a yellow card after being subbed on in the 72 minute.

=== Al-Ahli ===
On 1 September 2025, Gonçalves joined Saudi Pro League club Al-Ahli from Flamengo on a contract until 2027.

He made his debut for the club on 15 September 2025 in a 4–2 comeback victory against FC Nasaf in the 2025-26 AFC Champions League Elite. During his first season with Al-Ahli, Gonçalves helped the club win the 2025–26 AFC Champions League Elite title.

== Career statistics ==
=== Club ===
As of 20 August 2025.

Club	Season	League			State League		Cup		Continental		Other		Total	
Club	Season	Division	Apps	Goals	Apps	Goals	Apps	Goals	Apps	Goals	Apps	Goals	Apps	Goals
Flamengo	2022	Série A	3	0	0	0	—		—		—		3	0
Flamengo	2023	Série A	2	0	6	2	2	0	1 (Note: Appearance(s) in Copa Libertadores.)	0	2 (Note: Appearance(s) in Recopa Sudamericana.)	0	13	2
Flamengo	2024	Série A	13	2	3	0	3	0	2	0	—		21	2
Flamengo	2025	Série A	2	0	7	2	3	0	1	0	0	0	13	2
Flamengo	Total		20	2	16	4	8	0	4	0	2	0	50	6
Red Bull Bragantino (loan)	2023	Série A	12	0	—		—		1 (Note: Appearance(s) in Copa Sudamericana.)	0	—		13	0
Career total			32	2	16	4	8	0	5	0	2	0	63	6

== Honours ==
=== Youth ===
Flamengo

- Under-20 Intercontinental Cup: 2024, 2025

=== Professional ===
Flamengo

- Copa do Brasil: 2024
- Supercopa do Brasil: 2025
- Campeonato Carioca: 2024, 2025

Al-Ahli

- AFC Champions League Elite: 2025–26
