= Léo Ortiz =

Brazilian footballer

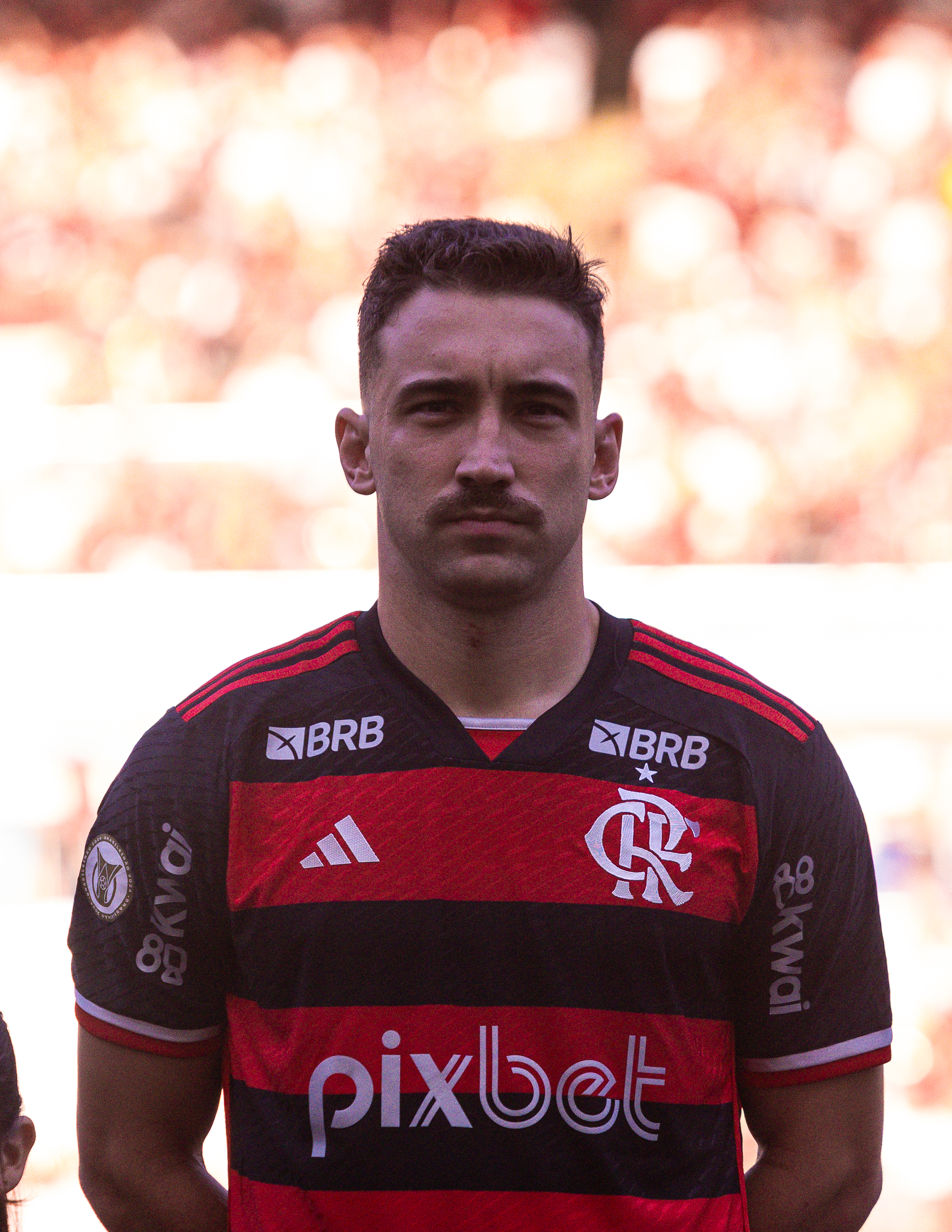
- Léo Ortiz with Flamengo in 2024

Personal information
- Full name: Leonardo Rech Ortiz
- Date of birth: 3 January 1996 (age 30)
- Place of birth: Porto Alegre, Rio Grande do Sul, Brazil
- Height: 1.86 m (6 ft 1 in)
- Position: Centre back

Team information
- Current team: Flamengo
- Number: 3

Youth career
- 2015–2016: Internacional

Senior career*
Years	Team	Apps	(Gls)
2015–2019	Internacional	25	(1)
2018	→ Sport Recife (loan)	15	(1)
2019	→ Red Bull Brasil (loan)	16	(0)
2019–2024	Red Bull Bragantino	170	(11)
2024–	Flamengo	88	(4)

International career^{‡}
2025–	Brazil	2	(0)
Medal record
Men's football
Representing Brazil
Copa América
Runner-up	2021 Brazil
- * Club domestic league appearances and goals as of 23:00, 19 March 2025 (UTC) ‡ National team caps and goals as of 25 March 2025

Leonardo "Léo" Rech Ortiz (Brazilian Portuguese: [ˈlɛw oʁˈtʃis]; born 3 January 1996) is a Brazilian footballer who plays as centre-back for Campeonato Brasileiro Série A club Flamengo and the Brazil national team.

Ortiz won the 2021 Bola de Prata and despite being called-up to the Brazil national team since 2021 he made his debut only in 2025.

He is son of Luís Fernando Roese Ortiz, one of the greatest Brazilian futsal players of all time.

== Club career ==
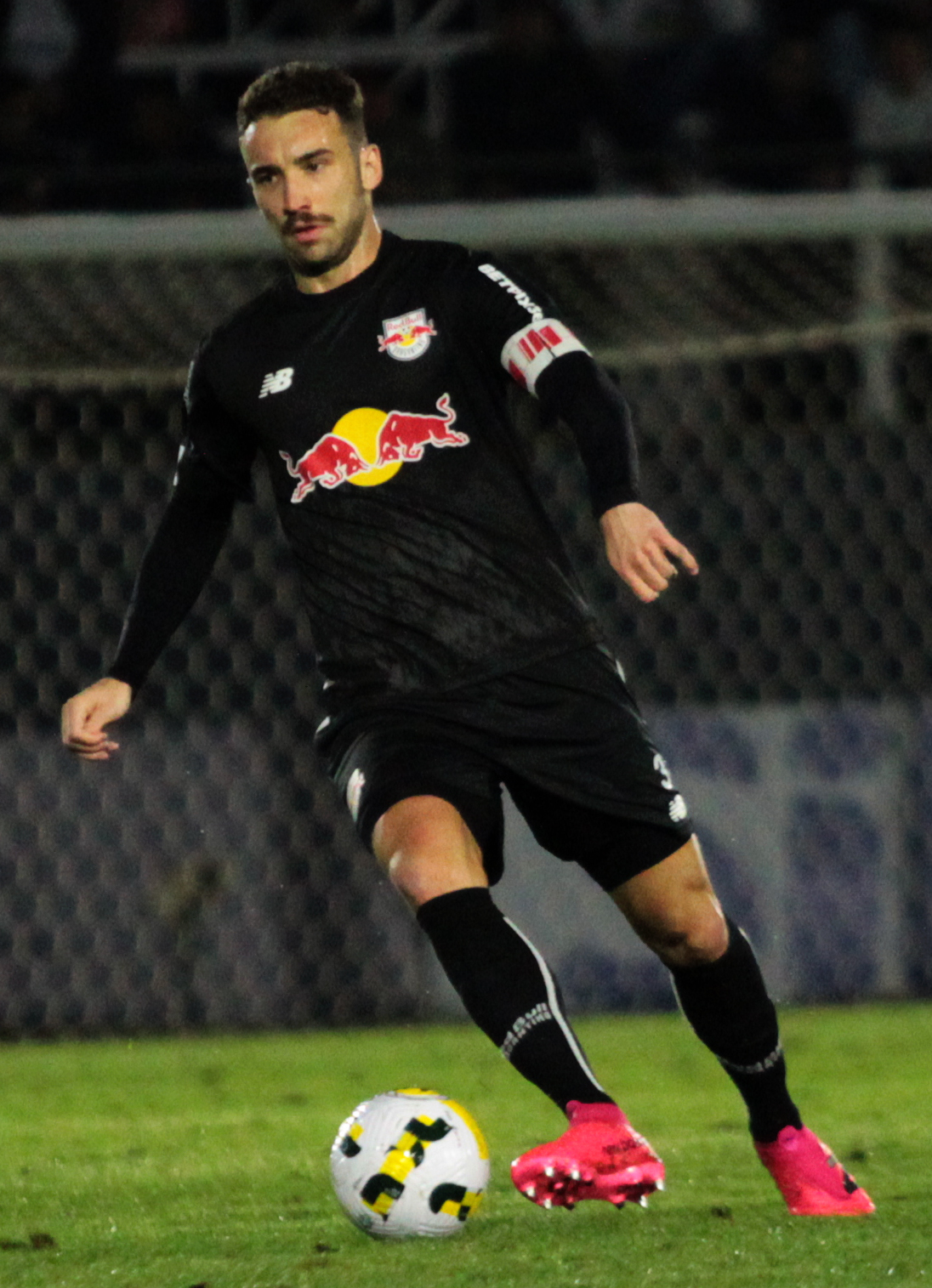
Ortiz with Red Bull Bragantino in 2022

=== Internacional ===
Born in Porto Alegre, Ortiz was an Internacional youth graduate. He made his senior debut with the B-team on 2 September 2015, starting in a 2–0 Copa FGF away win against Igrejinha.

After appearing with the B-side, Ortiz was promoted to the main squad in January 2017, and made his first team debut on 25 February by starting in a 1–0 home win against Brasil de Pelotas for the Campeonato Gaúcho championship. On 6 March, he extended his contract until December 2019.

Ortiz had 13 Campeonato Brasileiro Série B appearances during his first senior season, as his side achieved promotion to the Série A at first attempt.

Ortiz made his debut in the main category of Brazilian football on 15 April 2018, starting in a 3–0 away loss against América Mineiro.

==== Sport Recife (loan) ====
On 31 December 2017, he was loaned to top-tier side Sport Recife for one year. He only had six appearances for Sport Recife as his side had been relegated in the 2018 Campeonato Brasileiro Série A.

On 12 December 2018, Ortiz joined Red Bull Brasil on loan.

=== Red Bull Bragantino ===
In April 2019, Ortiz signed a permanent deal with Red Bull Bragantino, after the merger of Red Bull Brasil and Clube Atlético Bragantino.

=== Flamengo ===
On 5 March 2024, Ortiz signed a five year contract with Flamengo in a €7m transfer deal. He debuted for his new club on 10 April 2024 in a Copa Libertadores 2–0 win against Palestino, in this match Ortiz also scored his first goal for Flamengo.

During the 2025 season, Ortiz established himself as a cornerstone of the defense, featuring in 56 matches with 52 starts. His technical quality was evident in his distribution, maintaining a remarkable 91% pass accuracy and averaging 4.1 successful long balls per game, which helped drive his team forward. Offensively, the center-back contributed four goals and two assists, while also providing 16 key passes—an average of 0.3 per match. On the defensive end, Ortiz was equally dominant, winning 59% of his aerial challenges (1.9 per game) and maintaining a 58% overall duel success rate. His reading of the game led to 4.8 ball recoveries and 3.5 clearances per outing, showing great discipline by committing only 0.6 fouls per match despite receiving seven yellow cards throughout the year.

== International career ==
In June 2021, he received his first call-up to the Brazil national team, amidst the 2021 Copa América on home soil, to replace injured defender Felipe for the quarter-finals onward. He became the first Red Bull Bragantino player to be summoned to the national team since 1994, and the first to be called since Red Bull took over the club. Red Bull Bragantino was leading the 2021 Campeonato Brasileiro Série A at that Time. Brazil finished the continental championship as runners-up.

== Career statistics ==
=== Club ===
As of match played 2 September 2026

Appearances and goals by club, season and competition
Club	Season	League			State league		National cup		Continental		Other		Total	
Club	Season	Division	Apps	Goals	Apps	Goals	Apps	Goals	Apps	Goals	Apps	Goals	Apps	Goals
Internacional	2015	Série A	0	0	0	0	0	0	—		2 (Note: Appearances in Copa FGF)	0	2	0
Internacional	2016	Série A	0	0	0	0	0	0	—		2 (Note: Appearances in Copa Sul-Fronteira)	0	2	0
Internacional	2017	Série B	13	0	12	0	6	0	—		0	0	31	0
Internacional	Total		13	0	12	0	6	0	—		4	0	35	0
Sport Recife (loan)	2018	Série A	6	0	9	1	2	0	—		—		17	1
Red Bull Brasil (loan)	2019	Paulista	—		16	0	—		—		—		16	0
Red Bull Bragantino	2019	Série B	30	3	—		—		—		—		30	3
Red Bull Bragantino	2020	Série A	33	3	12	2	2	0	—		—		47	5
Red Bull Bragantino	2021	Série A	24	0	8	0	4	0	12 (Note: Appearances in Copa Sudamericana)	0	—		48	0
Red Bull Bragantino	2022	Série A	22	1	13	0	1	0	5 (Note: Appearances in Copa Libertadores)	0	—		41	1
Red Bull Bragantino	2023	Série A	20	2	—		0	0	2	1	—		22	3
Red Bull Bragantino	2024	Série A	—		8	2	—		2	0	—		10	2
Red Bull Bragantino	Total		129	9	41	4	7	0	21	1	—		198	14
Flamengo	2024	Série A	25	1	0	0	9	0	6	1	—		40	2
Flamengo	2025	Série A	26	1	9	2	2	0	10	1	6 (Note: Appearance in Supercopa do Brasil)	0	53	4
Flamengo	2026	Série A	22	1	4	0	1	0	4	0	3	0	34	1
Flamengo	Total		73	3	13	2	12	0	20	2	9	0	127	7
Career total			187	10	82	5	19	0	41	2	13	0	362	22

=== International ===
As of match played 25 March 2025

Appearances and goals by national team and year
National team	Year	Apps	Goals
Brazil	2025	2	0
Total		2	0

== Honours ==
Flamengo

- FIFA Challenger Cup: 2025
- FIFA Derby of the Americas: 2025
- Copa Libertadores: 2025
- Campeonato Brasileiro Série A: 2025
- Copa do Brasil: 2024
- Supercopa do Brasil: 2025
- Campeonato Carioca: 2024, 2025, 2026

Individual

- Campeonato Paulista Team of the Year: 2021, 2022
- Copa Sudamericana Team of the Tournament: 2021
- Bola de Prata: 2021
- Troféu Mesa Redonda Team of the Year: 2021, 2025
- Copa do Brasil Team of the Season: 2024
- Campeonato Carioca Team of the Year: 2025
