= Juninho (footballer, born 1996) =

Brazilian footballer

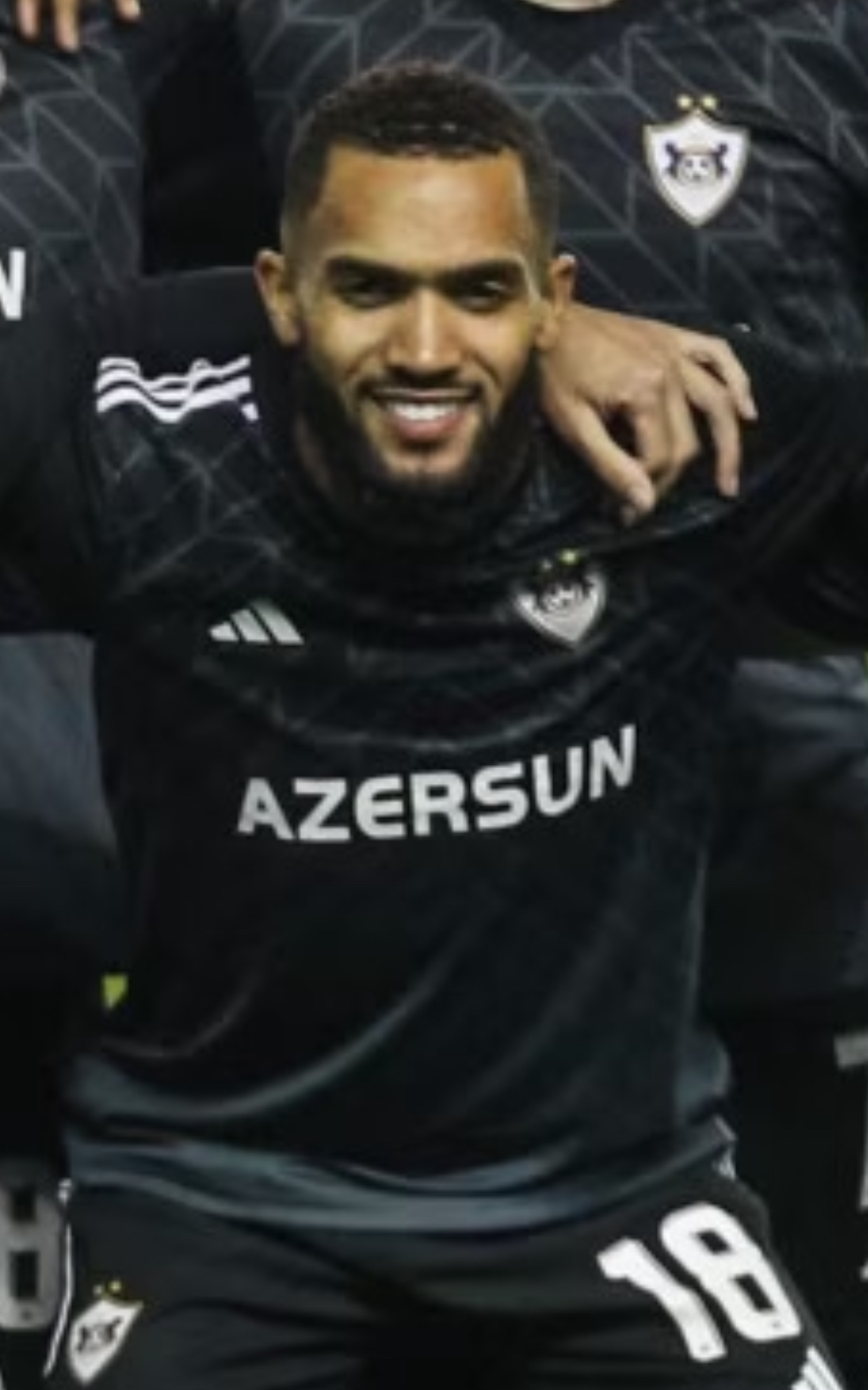
- Juninho in 2024

Personal information
- Full name: Olávio Vieira dos Santos Júnior
- Date of birth: 21 November 1996 (age 29)
- Place of birth: Pitangui, Brazil
- Height: 1.79 m (5 ft 10 in)
- Position: Forward

Team information
- Current team: Pumas
- Number: 23

Youth career
- 2013–2014: Atlético Paranaense

Senior career*
Years	Team	Apps	(Gls)
2015–2020	Atlético Paranaense	11	(0)
2015	→ Guaratinguetá (loan)	7	(2)
2016	→ Portimonense (loan)	1	(0)
2017	→ Brasil de Pelotas (loan)	25	(1)
2018	→ Novorizontino (loan)	13	(4)
2018	→ Figueirense (loan)	25	(2)
2019	→ Vila Nova (loan)	7	(1)
2019–2020	→ Estoril (loan)	24	(6)
2020–2023	Chaves	76	(13)
2023–2025	Qarabağ	48	(23)
2025	Flamengo	23	(3)
2026–	Pumas	35	(16)
- * Club domestic league appearances and goals as of 17 October 2026

Olávio Vieira dos Santos Júnior (born 21 November 1996), commonly known as Juninho, is a Brazilian professional footballer who plays as a forward for Liga MX club Pumas.

== Career ==
=== Qarabağ ===
On 25 June 2023, Juninho signed a three-year contract with Qarabağ.

=== Flamengo ===
On 13 January 2025, he transferred to Flamengo, signing a three-year contract that will keep him with the club until 2028.

=== Pumas ===
On 20 December 2025, Juninho moved to Mexico, joining Liga MX club Pumas for a reported fee of €5 million.

== Career statistics ==
As of match played on 3 August 2025

Appearances and goals by club, season and competition
Club	Season	League			State league (Note: Includes Campeonato Paranaense, Campeonato Gaúcho, Campeonato Paulista, Campeonato Goiano)		National cup (Note: Includes Copa do Brasil, Taca da Liga, Azerbaijan Cup)		Continental		Other		Total	
Club	Season	Division	Apps	Goals	Apps	Goals	Apps	Goals	Apps	Goals	Apps	Goals	Apps	Goals
Atlético Paranaense	2015	Série A	—		4	0	—		—		—		4	0
Atlético Paranaense	2016	Série A	7	0	—		4	0	—		—		11	0
Atlético Paranaense	Total		7	0	4	0	4	0	—		—		15	0
Guaratinguetá (loan)	2015	Série C	7	2	—		—		—		—		7	2
Portimonense (loan)	2015–16	LigaPro	1	0	—		—		—		—		1	0
Brasil de Pelotas (loan)	2017	Série B	19	1	6	0	—		—		3 (Note: Appearances in Primeira Liga)	1	28	2
Novorizontino (loan)	2018	Série D	—		13	4	—		—		—		13	4
Figueirense (loan)	2018	Série B	25	2	—		0	0	—		—		25	2
Vila Nova (loan)	2019	Série B	5	1	2	0	4	0	—		—		11	1
Estoril (loan)	2019–20	LigaPro	24	6	—		1	0	—		—		25	6
Chaves	2020–21	Liga Portugal 2	20	8	—		0	0	—		—		20	8
Chaves	2021–22	Liga Portugal 2	26	1	—		1	0	—		—		27	1
Chaves	2022–23	Primeira Liga	30	4	—		2	0	—		—		32	4
Chaves	Total		76	13	—		3	0	—		—		79	13
Qarabağ	2023–24	Azerbaijan Premier League	35	20	—		5	5	15 (Note: One appearance in UEFA Champions League, fourteen appearances and six goals in UEFA Europa League)	6	—		55	31
Qarabağ	2024–25	Azerbaijan Premier League	13	3	—		1	0	11 (Note: Six appearances and six goals in the UEFA Champions League, five appearances and two goals in the UEFA Europa League)	8	—		25	11
Qarabağ	Total		48	23	—		6	5	26	14	—		80	42
Flamengo	2025	Série A	11	0	8	2	2	0	4 (Note: Appearances in Copa Libertadores)	1	2 (Note: One appearance in Supercopa do Brasil, one appearance in FIFA Club World Cup)	0	27	3
Career total			223	48	33	6	20	5	30	15	5	1	311	75

== Honours ==
=== Club ===
Qarabağ

- Azerbaijan Premier League: 2023–24
- Azerbaijan Cup: 2023–24

Flamengo

- FIFA Challenger Cup: 2025
- FIFA Derby of the Americas: 2025
- Copa Libertadores: 2025
- Campeonato Brasileiro Série A: 2025
- Supercopa do Brasil: 2025
- Campeonato Carioca: 2025

=== Individual ===
- Azerbaijan Premier League top scorer: 2023–24
