= Joshua (footballer, born 2007) =

Brazilian footballer (born 2007)

Personal information
- Full name: Caio Joshua Lana de Andrade
- Date of birth: 26 May 2007 (age 19)
- Place of birth: Rio de Janeiro, Brazil
- Height: 1.80 m (5 ft 11 in)
- Position: Attacking midfielder

Team information
- Current team: Flamengo
- Number: 79

Youth career
- 2017–: Flamengo

Senior career*
Years	Team	Apps	(Gls)
2025–	Flamengo	1	(1)
- * Club domestic league appearances and goals as of 2 May 2025

Caio Joshua Lana de Andrade (born 26 May 2007), simply known as Joshua, is a Brazilian professional footballer who plays as an attacking midfielder for Flamengo.

== Career ==
At the club since he was 11 years old, Joshua completed all his training in the youth sectors of CR Flamengo. In 2025, after standing out in the Copa São Paulo de Futebol Jr. and the U-20 Copa Libertadores, he was integrated into the main squad. He made his professional debut against Botafogo-PB, in the third phase of the 2025 Copa do Brasil, where he also scored the winning goal. Flamengo signed him for a long term contract running through December 2029, including a release clause valued at €70million.

== Honours ==
=== Youth ===
Flamengo U20

- Under-20 Intercontinental Cup: 2025
- U-20 Copa Libertadores: 2025

=== Club ===
Flamengo

- Copa Libertadores: 2025
- Campeonato Brasileiro Série A: 2025
