= Cleiton (footballer, born 2003) =

Brazilian footballer

Personal information
- Full name: Cleiton Santana dos Santos
- Date of birth: 25 April 2003 (age 23)
- Place of birth: Taperoá, Brasil
- Height: 1.94 m (6 ft 4 in)
- Position: Centre-back

Team information
- Current team: VfL Wolfsburg
- Number: 33

Youth career
- 2019–2020: Canaã
- 2020–2023: Flamengo

Senior career*
Years	Team	Apps	(Gls)
2021–2025	Flamengo	21	(0)
2026–	VfL Wolfsburg	2	(0)
- * Club domestic league appearances and goals as of 18 September 2026

Cleiton Santana dos Santos (born 25 April 2003), simply known as Cleiton, is a Brazilian professional footballer who plays as a central defender for 2. Bundesliga club VfL Wolfsburg.

== Club career ==
=== Flamengo ===
Cleiton made his debut on the 26 January 2022, starting for Flamengo in the Campeonato Carioca 2–1 home win against Portuguesa-RJ.

=== VfL Wolfsburg ===
On 17 December 2025, Cleiton signed a contract with VfL Wolfsburg in Germany from 1 January 2026 to 30 June 2030.

== Career statistics ==
As of 18 September 2026

Club	Season	League			State League		Cup		Continental		Other		Total	
Club	Season	Division	Apps	Goals	Apps	Goals	Apps	Goals	Apps	Goals	Apps	Goals	Apps	Goals
Flamengo	2021	Série A	0	0	–		–		–		–		0	0
Flamengo	2022	Série A	1	0	5	0	0	0	0	0	–		6	0
Flamengo	2023	Série A	0	0	3	0	0	0	0	0	–		3	0
Flamengo	2024	Série A	4	0	1	0	0	0	–		–		5	0
Flamengo	2025	Série A	2	0	5	0	0	0	0	0	0	0	7	0
Flamengo	Total		7	0	14	0	0	0	0	0	0	0	21	0
VfL Wolfsburg	2026–27	2. Bundesliga	2	0	—		0	0	—		—		2	0
Career total			9	0	14	0	0	0	0	0	0	0	23	0

== Honours ==
=== Club ===
Flamengo

- Copa Libertadores: 2022, 2025
- Campeonato Brasileiro Série A: 2025
- Copa do Brasil: 2022, 2024
- Supercopa do Brasil: 2025
- Campeonato Carioca: 2024, 2025
