= Guilherme Gomes =

Brazilian footballer (born 2006)

Personal information
- Full name: Guilherme Henrique Bernardineli Gomes
- Date of birth: 2 February 2006 (age 20)
- Place of birth: Mandaguari, Brasil
- Height: 1.81 m (5 ft 11 in)
- Position: Attacking midfielder

Team information
- Current team: Flamengo
- Number: 19

Youth career
- 2019–2022: Azuriz
- 2022–2024: Flamengo

Senior career*
Years	Team	Apps	(Gls)
2024–2026	Flamengo	11	(5)
2026–	Gil Vicente	0	(0)
- * Club domestic league appearances and goals as of 6 September 2026

Guilherme Henrique Bernardineli Gomes (born 2 February 2006), known as Guilherme Gomes or just Guilherme, is a Brazilian professional footballer who plays as an attacking midfielder for Primeira Liga club Gil Vicente in Portugal.

== Career ==
Born in Mandaguari, Paraná, Guilherme joined Flamengo's youth sides in 2022, from Azuriz. On 15 June 2023, he signed his first professional contract with the former, after agreeing to a three-year deal.

Guilherme won the 2024 Under-20 Intercontinental Cup with the under-20 team, and made his senior – and Série A – debut on 20 November 2024; after coming on as a second-half substitute for Carlos Alcaraz, he scored the equalizer in a 2–1 away win over Cuiabá.

On 4 September 2026, Guilherme signed a four-season contract with Portuguese club Gil Vicente.

== Career statistics ==
As of 22 November 2024

Club	Season	League			State League		Cup		Continental		Other		Total	
Club	Season	Division	Apps	Goals	Apps	Goals	Apps	Goals	Apps	Goals	Apps	Goals	Apps	Goals
Flamengo	2024	Série A	2	3	6	1	0	0	0	0	—		8	3
Career total			2	3	6	1	0	0	0	0	0	0	8	3

== Honours ==
Flamengo U20

- Under-20 Intercontinental Cup: 2024, 2025
- U-20 Copa Libertadores: 2025

Flamengo

- Campeonato Brasileiro Série A: 2025
- Campeonato Carioca: 2025
