= Johnny Góes =

Brazilian footballer (born 2007)

Personal information
- Full name: Johnny Monteiro Góes
- Date of birth: 27 March 2007 (age 19)
- Place of birth: Brazil
- Height: 1.87 m (6 ft 2 in)
- Positions: Centre-back; left-back

Team information
- Current team: Flamengo
- Number: 77

Youth career
- 2015–2022: Vasco da Gama
- 2022–2023: Boavista
- 2023–: Flamengo

Senior career*
| Years | Team | Apps | (Gls) |
| 2025– | Flamengo | 1 | (0) |
- * Club domestic league appearances and goals as of 21:13, 11 December 2025 (UTC)

Johnny Monteiro Góes (born 27 March 2007), known as Johnny Góes or just Johnny, is a Brazilian professional footballer who plays as either a centre-back or a left-back for Campeonato Brasileiro Série A club Flamengo.

== Career ==
Johnny joined Vasco da Gama's youth sides in 2015, but left the club in 2022, and played briefly for Boavista before joining Flamengo in November 2023. He became a regular unit of the under-20 team in 2025, and made his professional – and Série A – debut on 6 December of that year, starting in a 3–3 away draw against Mirassol as the club was already champions and most of the first team regulars were travelling to the 2025 FIFA Intercontinental Cup.

On 8 December 2025, Johnny renewed his contract with Fla until December 2027.

== Career statistics ==
As of 11 December 2025

| Club | Season | League | | | State League | | Cup | | Continental | | Other | | Total | |
| Club | Season | Division | Apps | Goals | Apps | Goals | Apps | Goals | Apps | Goals | Apps | Goals | Apps | Goals |
|---|---|---|---|---|---|---|---|---|---|---|---|---|---|---|
| Flamengo | 2025 | Série A | 1 | 0 | 0 | 0 | 0 | 0 | 0 | 0 | 0 | 0 | 1 | 0 |
| Career total | | | 1 | 0 | 0 | 0 | 0 | 0 | 0 | 0 | 0 | 0 | 1 | 0 |

== Honours ==
Flamengo

- Copa Libertadores: 2025
- Campeonato Brasileiro Série A: 2025
