= 2024 Under-20 Intercontinental Cup =

Football match

Flamengo	Olympiacos
(Brazil)	(Greece)
2	1
- Date: 24 August 2024
- Venue: Maracanã, Rio de Janeiro
- Referee: Yender Herrera (Venezuela)
- Attendance: 31,237
- Weather: Sunny; 26 °C (79 °F)

The 2024 Under-20 Intercontinental Cup (Spanish: Sub-20 Intercontinental 2024) was the third edition of the UEFA–CONMEBOL Under-20 Intercontinental Cup, a one-off football match organised by CONMEBOL and UEFA between the winners of the U-20 Copa Libertadores and UEFA Youth League. As host confederation, CONMEBOL was in charge of the main organization of this edition.

At club Flamengo's initiative, the match was played on 24 August 2024 at Maracanã Stadium in Rio de Janeiro, Brazil, between the Brazilian team Flamengo, the 2024 U-20 Copa Libertadores champions, and Greek team Olympiacos, the 2023–24 UEFA Youth League champions.

Flamengo beat Olympiacos 2–1, becoming the first brazilian side to win the Under-20 Intercontinental Cup.

== Teams ==
Team	Qualification
(Brazil) Flamengo	2024 U-20 Copa Libertadores champions
(Greece) Olympiacos	2023–24 UEFA Youth League champions

== Pre-match ==
=== Officials ===
The officiating team was appointed by the CONMEBOL Referee Commission; only referees in the FIFA International Referees List were eligible. On 19 August 2024, CONMEBOL announced the refereeing team with Venezuelan official Yender Herrera as the referee for the match. Herrera is a FIFA referee since 2021. He was joined by his fellow Venezuelans Alberto Ponte and Migdalia Rodríguez as assistant referees, while Ecuadorian Bryan Loayza was the fourth official. Carlos Orbe acted as the video assistant referee (VAR) and Mónica Amboya was the assistant VAR official (AVAR), both also from Ecuador.

=== Squads ===
Each team had to submit their list of 23 players (including at least two goalkeepers) to its respective confederation by 20 August 2024, 19:00 UTC−3 (BRT) or 24:00 UTC+2 (UTC+2), as appropriate. Only players born on or after 1 January 2004 were eligible to compete. Teams were permitted to make player replacements in cases of serious injuries up to 24 hours prior the start of the match, provided that it was approved by the CONMEBOL Chief Medical Officer and the team doctor concerned.

On 20 August 2024, Olympiacos announced their squad of 23 players with whom they travelled to Brazil. Flamengo announced their squad on 21 August 2024.

== Match ==
=== Details ===
24 August 2024
16:00 UTC-3

Flamengo (Brazil)	2–1	(Greece) Olympiacos
Garcia 73'; Teresa 90+2'	CONMEBOL; UEFA	Liatsikouras 54'

Maracanã, Rio de Janeiro
Attendance: 31,237
Referee: Yender Herrera (Venezuela)

Flamengo	Olympiacos

GK	1	(Brazil) Dyogo Alves
RB	2	(Brazil) Daniel Sales	(substituted off) 86'
CB	3	(Brazil) Iago (c)
CB	4	(Brazil) João Victor
LB	6	(Brazil) Zé Welinton	(substituted off) 61'
DM	5	(Brazil) Rayan Lucas
CM	17	(Brazil) João Alves	(substituted off) 61'
CM	7	(Brazil) Guilherme Gomes	(substituted off) 65'
RF	10	(Brazil) Matheus Gonçalves
CF	9	(Brazil) Wallace Yan
LF	11	(Nigeria) Shola Ogundana	(substituted off) 86'
Substitutes:
GK	20	(Brazil) Lucas Furtado
GK	22	(Brazil) Caio Barone
DF	13	(Brazil) Gusttavo
DF	14	(Brazil) Da Mata	(substituted on) 86'
DF	15	(Brazil) João Carbone
DF	23	(Brazil) Lucyan
MF	8	(Brazil) Caio Garcia	(substituted on) 61'
MF	16	(Brazil) Jean Carlos	(substituted on) 61'
FW	18	(Brazil) Adriel	(substituted on) 86'
FW	23	(Brazil) Victor Silva
FW	21	(Brazil) Felipe Teresa	(substituted on) 65'
Manager:
Filipe Luís

GK	1	(Greece) Nikolaos Botis
CB	24	(Albania) Antonis Dama
CB	4	(Greece) Isidoros Koutsidis (c)
CB	21	(Greece) Vasilios Prekates
RM	6	(Greece) Argyrios Liatsikouras
CM	23	(Greece) Theofanis Bakoulas	(yellow card) 68'
CM	8	(Greece) Christos Mouzakitis
LM	3	(Greece) Nektarios Alafakis
RF	10	(Greece) Antonis Papakanellos
CF	9	(Greece) Charalampos Kostoulas
LF	11	(Greece) Stavros Pnevmonidis
Substitutes:
GK	15	(Greece) Alexandros Exarchos
GK	28	(Greece) Georgios Kouraklis
DF	2	(Greece) Georgios Koutsopoulos
DF	5	(Greece) Vasilios Karkatsalis
DF	17	(Greece) Paraskevas Plionis
DF	25	(Greece) Ilias Panagakos
DF	26	(Greece) Giannis Rolakis
MF	7	(Ukraine) Konstantin Plish
MF	12	(Greece) Paschalis Toufakis
MF	18	(Greece) Christos Ligdas
MF	20	(Greece) Nikolaos Lolis
FW	14	(Greece) Alexandros Tzamalis
Manager:
Sotiris Sylaidopoulos

Assistant referees:
Alberto Ponte (Venezuela)
Migdalia Rodríguez (Venezuela)
Fourth official:
Bryan Loayza (Ecuador)
Video assistant referee:
Carlos Orbe (Ecuador)
Assistant video assistant referee:
Mónica Amboya (Ecuador)

Match rules:

- 90 minutes
- Extra time would not be played
- Penalty shoot-out if tied after 90 minutes
- Eleven named substitutes
- Maximum of five substitutions (Note: Each team was given only three opportunities to make substitutions, excluding substitutions made at half-time.)
