= Agustín Rossi (footballer) =

Argentine footballer

Personal information
- Full name: Agustín Daniel Rossi
- Date of birth: 21 August 1995 (age 31)
- Place of birth: Buenos Aires, Argentina
- Height: 1.93 m (6 ft 4 in)
- Position: Goalkeeper

Team information
- Current team: Flamengo
- Number: 1

Youth career
- Chacarita Juniors

Senior career*
| Years | Team | Apps | (Gls) |
| 2014 | Chacarita Juniors | 19 | (0) |
| 2015–2016 | Estudiantes de La Plata | 3 | (0) |
| 2016 | → Defensa y Justicia (loan) | 10 | (0) |
| 2017–2023 | Boca Juniors | 117 | (0) |
| 2019 | → Deportes Antofagasta (loan) | 5 | (0) |
| 2019–2020 | → Lanús (loan) | 23 | (0) |
| 2023 | → Al Nassr (loan) | 7 | (0) |
| 2023– | Flamengo | 145 | (0) |

International career
| 2015 | Argentina U20 | 2 | (0) |
- * Club domestic league appearances and goals as of 21 November 2026

Agustín Daniel Rossi (born 21 August 1995) is an Argentine professional footballer who plays as a goalkeeper for Campeonato Brasileiro Série A club Flamengo.

== Club career ==
=== Chacarita Juniors ===
Born in Buenos Aires, Rossi represented Chacarita Juniors as a youth. He made his first-team debut on 2 April 2014, starting in a 1–3 away loss against Instituto, for the season's Copa Argentina.

=== Estudiantes de La Plata ===
Rossi moved to Estudiantes on 25 December 2014. He made his Primera División debut the following 18 April, playing the full 90 minutes in a 1–1 home draw against Rosario Central.

==== Defensa y Justicia (loan) ====
On 24 July 2016, Rossi was loaned to fellow top-tier club Defensa y Justicia.

=== Boca Juniors ===
On 1 February 2017, Rossi was transferred to Boca Juniors for €1.17m.

==== Al Nassr (loan) ====
On 21 January 2023, Rossi moved to Saudi Professional League club Al Nassr on a six-month loan until 30 June 2023 as Boca Juniors decided not to use the player anymore until the end of his contract. At the Saudi club Rossi covered the injured David Ospina.

=== Flamengo ===
On 9 January 2023, Flamengo announced a contract being signed with Rossi from 1 July 2023 until 31 December 2027, as the current deal with Boca Juniors ran out at the end of June. He was officially presented by Flamengo on 1 July 2023, becoming Flamengo's first non-Brazilian goalkeeper since fellow Argentine Ubaldo Fillol in 1985. Rossi couldn't manage to break into the first team with head coach Jorge Sampaoli until the second leg of the 2023 Copa do Brasil finals on 24 September 2023. Ironically, this was the last match of the Argentine head coach before being fired. With the arrival of the next head coach, Tite, Rossi instantly became the main goalkeeper. He finished the 2023 season with a total of 8 clean sheets in 16 matches, including all competitions.

Rossi broke Flamengo's record for the most clean sheets in a row, including all competitions, with 11 from 31 January 2024 to 30 March 2024.

On the night of 8 May 2025, Rossi's car was shot at in an attempted robbery when he was returning home from Galeão Airport after a Copa Libertadores match against Central Córdoba in Argentina. He was not injured as his car was armoured. Despite the scary moment, Rossi later said he had no intention of leaving Flamengo or Rio de Janeiro: "These are things that can happen here or in Argentina."

Currently, Rossi is applying for Brazilian citizenship. If successful, he could start playing for the Brazilian national football team in 2028.

== Career statistics ==
As of match played 21 November 2026

Appearances and goals by club, season and competition
| Club | Season | League | | | National cup | | League cup | | Continental | | Other | | Total | |
| Club | Season | Division | Apps | Goals | Apps | Goals | Apps | Goals | Apps | Goals | Apps | Goals | Apps | Goals |
|---|---|---|---|---|---|---|---|---|---|---|---|---|---|---|
| Chacarita Juniors | 2013–14 | Primera B Metropolitana | 1 | 0 | 1 | 0 | — | | — | | — | | 2 | 0 |
| Chacarita Juniors | 2014 | Primera B Metropolitana | 18 | 0 | — | | — | | — | | — | | 18 | 0 |
| Chacarita Juniors | Total | | 19 | 0 | 1 | 0 | — | | — | | — | | 20 | 0 |
| Estudiantes | 2015 | Argentine Primera División | 1 | 0 | — | | — | | 0 | 0 | — | | 1 | 0 |
| Estudiantes | 2016 | Argentine Primera División | 2 | 0 | — | | — | | — | | — | | 2 | 0 |
| Estudiantes | Total | | 3 | 0 | — | | — | | 0 | 0 | — | | 3 | 0 |
| Defensa y Justicia (loan) | 2016–17 | Argentine Primera División | 10 | 0 | 1 | 0 | — | | — | | — | | 11 | 0 |
| Boca Juniors | 2016–17 | Argentine Primera División | 16 | 0 | — | | — | | — | | — | | 16 | 0 |
| Boca Juniors | 2017–18 | Argentine Primera División | 26 | 0 | 1 | 0 | — | | 6 (Note: Appearance(s) in Copa Libertadores) | 0 | 1 (Note: Appearance(s) in Supercopa Argentina) | 0 | 34 | 0 |
| Boca Juniors | 2018–19 | Argentine Primera División | 6 | 0 | 2 | 0 | — | | 4 | 0 | — | | 12 | 0 |
| Boca Juniors | 2020–21 | Argentine Primera División | 6 | 0 | 1 | 0 | — | | 4 | 0 | — | | 11 | 0 |
| Boca Juniors | 2021 | Argentine Primera División | 26 | 0 | 4 | 0 | — | | 2 | 0 | — | | 32 | 0 |
| Boca Juniors | 2022 | Argentine Primera División | 37 | 0 | 1 | 0 | — | | 7 | 0 | 1 (Note: Appearance(s) in Trofeo de Campeones) | 0 | 46 | 0 |
| Boca Juniors | Total | | 117 | 0 | 9 | 0 | — | | 23 | 0 | 2 | 0 | 151 | 0 |
| Antofagasta (loan) | 2019 | Chilean Primera División | 5 | 0 | — | | — | | — | | — | | 5 | 0 |
| Lanús (loan) | 2019–20 | Argentine Primera División | 23 | 0 | 4 | 0 | 1 | 0 | 2 (Note: Appearance(s) in Copa Sudamericana) | 0 | — | | 30 | 0 |
| Al Nassr (loan) | 2022–23 | Saudi Pro League | 7 | 0 | 0 | 0 | — | | — | | 1 (Note: Appearance(s) in Saudi Super Cup) | 0 | 8 | 0 |
| Flamengo | 2023 | Série A | 15 | 0 | 1 | 0 | — | | 0 | 0 | — | | 16 | 0 |
| Flamengo | 2024 | Série A | 35 | 0 | 4 | 0 | — | | 10 | 0 | 12 (Note: Appearances in Campeonato Carioca) | 0 | 61 | 0 |
| Flamengo | 2025 | Série A | 37 | 0 | 2 | 0 | — | | 13 | 0 | 16 (Note: Eight appearances in Campeonato Carioca, one appearance in Supercopa do Brasil, four appearances in FIFA Club World Cup, two appearances in FIFA Intercontinental Cup) | 0 | 68 | 0 |
| Flamengo | 2026 | Série A | 36 | 0 | 2 | 0 | — | | 10 | 0 | 5 (Note: two appearances in Campeonato Carioca, one appearance in Supercopa do Brasil, two appearances in Recopa Sudamericana) | 0 | 53 | 0 |
| Flamengo | Total | | 123 | 0 | 9 | 0 | — | | 33 | 0 | 33 | 0 | 198 | 0 |
| Career Total | | | 305 | 0 | 24 | 0 | 1 | 0 | 53 | 0 | 35 | 0 | 426 | 0 |

== Honours ==
Boca Juniors

- Argentine Primera División: 2016–17, 2017–18, 2022
- Copa Argentina: 2019–20
- Copa de la Liga Profesional: 2020, 2022

Flamengo

- FIFA Challenger Cup: 2025
- FIFA Derby of the Americas: 2025
- Copa Libertadores: 2025
- Campeonato Brasileiro Série A: 2025, 2026
- Copa do Brasil: 2024
- Supercopa do Brasil: 2025
- Campeonato Carioca: 2024, 2025, 2026

Individual

- Copa Argentina Best Player: 2019–20
- Campeonato Carioca Team of the Year: 2024, 2025
- Copa do Brasil Team of the Championship: 2024
- Copa Libertadores Team of the Tournament: 2025
- Campeonato Brasileiro Série A Team of the Year: 2025
- South American Team of the Year: 2025
