= Matheus Cunha (footballer, born 2001) =

Brazilian footballer

Personal information
- Full name: Matheus Cunha Queiroz
- Date of birth: 24 May 2001 (age 25)
- Place of birth: Tupi Paulista, Brazil
- Height: 1.93 m (6 ft 4 in)
- Position: Goalkeeper

Team information
- Current team: Internacional
- Number: 23

Youth career
- 2016–2020: São Paulo
- 2021–2022: Flamengo

Senior career*
Years	Team	Apps	(Gls)
2021–2025	Flamengo	36	(0)
2026–	Cruzeiro	10	(0)
2026–	→ Internacional (loan)	1	(0)

International career
2023	Brazil U23	1	(0)
- * Club domestic league appearances and goals as of 21:53, 8 April 2026 (UTC)

Matheus Cunha Queiroz (born 24 May 2001) is a Brazilian professional footballer who plays as a goalkeeper for Campeonato Brasileiro Série A club Internacional, on loan from Cruzeiro.

== Career ==
=== Flamengo ===
Cunha made his debut on the 26 January 2022, starting for Flamengo in the Campeonato Carioca 2–1 home win against Portuguesa (RJ).

On 6 June 2023, Cunha extended his contract with Flamengo through 31 December 2025.

=== Cruzeiro ===
On 1 January 2026, after leaving Flamengo, Cunha joined fellow Série A club Cruzeiro on a three-year contract.

== Career statistics ==
As of match played 21 May 2025

Appearances and goals by club, season and competition
Club	Season	League			State league		National cup		Continental		Other		Total	
Club	Season	Division	Apps	Goals	Apps	Goals	Apps	Goals	Apps	Goals	Apps	Goals	Apps	Goals
Flamengo	2021	Série A	0	0	0	0	0	0	0	0	0	0	0	0
Flamengo	2022	Série A	0	0	2 (Note: Appearance(s) in Campeonato Carioca)	0	0	0	0	0	0	0	2	0
Flamengo	2023	Série A	19	0	6	0	6	0	5 (Note: Appearance(s) in Copa Libertadores)	0	0	0	36	0
Flamengo	2024	Série A	3	0	3	0	6	0	—		—		12	0
Flamengo	2025	Série A	0	0	3	0	2	0	0	0	0	0	5	0
Flamengo	Total		22	0	14	0	14	0	5	0	0	0	55	0
Cruzeiro	2026	Série A	0	0	0	0	0	0	0	0	0	0	0	0
Career total			22	0	14	0	14	0	5	0	0	0	55	0

== Honours ==
=== Club ===
Flamengo

- FIFA Challenger Cup: 2025
- FIFA Derby of the Americas: 2025
- Copa Libertadores: 2022, 2025
- Campeonato Brasileiro Série A: 2025
- Copa do Brasil: 2022, 2024
- Supercopa do Brasil: 2025
- Campeonato Carioca: 2021, 2024, 2025
