= 2025 Supercopa do Brasil =

8th Supercopa do Brasil, annual football match

| Botafogo | Flamengo |
| (Rio de Janeiro (state)) | (Rio de Janeiro (state)) |
| 1 | 3 |
- Date: 2 February 2025
- Venue: Mangueirão, Belém
- Man of the Match: Bruno Henrique (Flamengo)
- Referee: Ramon Abatti Abel
- Attendance: 44,952

The 2025 Supercopa do Brasil (officially the Supercopa Betano Rei 2025 for sponsorship reasons) was the eighth edition of Supercopa do Brasil (also known as Supercopa Rei), an annual football match played between the champions of the Campeonato Brasileiro Série A and Copa do Brasil.

This edition featured Botafogo, champions of the 2024 Campeonato Brasileiro Série A, and Flamengo, champions of the 2024 Copa do Brasil, the first Clássico da Rivalidade in this competition.

On 8 March 2024, the CBF announced that the tournament would take place on 2 February 2025, at Mangueirão in Belém.

Flamengo defeated Botafogo by a score of 3–1 to win their third Supercopa title.

== Qualified teams ==
| Team | Qualification | Previous appearances (bold indicates winners) |
|---|---|---|
| (Rio de Janeiro (state)) Botafogo | 2024 Campeonato Brasileiro Série A champions | — |
| (Rio de Janeiro (state)) Flamengo | 2024 Copa do Brasil champions | 5 (1991, **2020**, **2021**, 2022, 2023) |

== Match ==
=== Details ===
2 February 2025
16:00 UTC–3

| Botafogo (Rio de Janeiro (state)) | 1–3 | (Rio de Janeiro (state)) Flamengo |
|---|---|---|
| Patrick de Paula 87' | Report | Bruno Henrique 13' (pen.), 20'; Luiz Araújo 83' |

Mangueirão, Belém
Attendance: 44,952
Referee: Ramon Abatti Abel (Santa Catarina)

| **Botafogo** | **Flamengo** |

| GK | 12 | (Brazil) John |
| DF | 4 | (Uruguay) Mateo Ponte | | (substituted off) 46' |
| DF | 3 | (Brazil) Lucas Halter |
| DF | 20 | (Argentina) Alexander Barboza | (yellow card) 90' |
| DF | 13 | (Brazil) Alex Telles | (yellow card) 85' |
| MF | 26 | (Brazil) Gregore |
| MF | 17 | (Brazil) Marlon Freitas (c) |
| MF | 10 | (Venezuela) Jefferson Savarino | | (substituted off) 86' |
| FW | 7 | (Brazil) Artur | | (substituted off) 90+3' |
| FW | 99 | (Brazil) Igor Jesus | (yellow card) 68' |
| FW | 11 | (Brazil) Matheus Martins | | (substituted off) 80' |
Substitutes:
| GK | 24 | (Brazil) Léo Linck |
| DF | 2 | (Brazil) Vitinho | | (substituted on) 46' |
| DF | 15 | (Angola) Bastos |
| DF | 66 | (Brazil) Cuiabano |
| MF | 5 | (Brazil) Danilo Barbosa |
| MF | 6 | (Brazil) Patrick de Paula | | (substituted on) 86' |
| MF | 18 | (Brazil) Kauê |
| MF | 25 | (Brazil) Allan |
| MF | 28 | (Brazil) Newton |
| FW | 19 | (Brazil) Kayke | | (substituted on) 90+3' |
| FW | 67 | (Brazil) Yarlen |
| FW | 69 | (Brazil) Rafael Lobato | | (substituted on) 80' |
Manager:
(Brazil) Carlos Leiria

| GK | 1 | (Argentina) Agustín Rossi |
| DF | 43 | (Brazil) Wesley |
| DF | 3 | (Brazil) Léo Ortiz |
| DF | 4 | (Brazil) Léo Pereira | | (substituted off) 90+3' |
| DF | 26 | (Brazil) Alex Sandro |
| MF | 5 | (Chile) Erick Pulgar | (yellow card) 45+2' |
| MF | 18 | (Uruguay) Nicolás de la Cruz | (yellow card) 68' | (substituted off) 90+2' |
| MF | 8 | (Brazil) Gerson (c) |
| FW | 50 | (Ecuador) Gonzalo Plata | | (substituted off) 71' |
| FW | 27 | (Brazil) Bruno Henrique | | (substituted off) 80' |
| FW | 30 | (Brazil) Michael | | (substituted off) 80' |
Substitutes:
| GK | 25 | (Brazil) Matheus Cunha |
| DF | 2 | (Uruguay) Guillermo Varela |
| DF | 6 | (Brazil) Ayrton Lucas |
| DF | 13 | (Brazil) Danilo | | (substituted on) 90+3' |
| DF | 33 | (Brazil) Cleiton |
| MF | 10 | (Uruguay) Giorgian de Arrascaeta | | (substituted on) 71' |
| MF | 20 | (Brazil) Matheus Gonçalves |
| MF | 29 | (Brazil) Allan |
| MF | 52 | (Brazil) Evertton Araújo | | (substituted on) 90+2' |
| FW | 7 | (Brazil) Luiz Araújo | (yellow card) 84' | (substituted on) 80' |
| FW | 11 | (Brazil) Everton |
| FW | 23 | (Brazil) Juninho | | (substituted on) 80' |
Manager:
(Brazil) Filipe Luís

Man of the Match:
Bruno Henrique (Flamengo)
Assistant referees:
Neuza Ines Back (São Paulo)
Guilherme Dias Camilo (Minas Gerais)
Fourth official:
Matheus Delgado Candançan (São Paulo)
Fifth official:
Gizeli Casaril (Santa Catarina)
Video assistant referee:
Wagner Reway (Espírito Santo)
Assistant video assistant referees:
Fabricio Porfirio de Moura (São Paulo)
Marco Aurelio Augusto Fazekas Ferreira (Minas Gerais)

**Match rules**

- 90 minutes.
- Penalty shoot-out if scores still level.
- Twelve named substitutes.
- Maximum of five substitutions.
