= Under-20 Intercontinental Cup =

- Organiser(s): CONMEBOL; UEFA
- Founded: 2022; 4 years ago
- Region: South America; Europe
- Teams: 2
- Current champions: (Spain) Real Madrid (1st title)
- Most championships: (Brazil) Flamengo (2 titles)
- Website: (UEFA) (Conmebol)
- 2026 Under-20 Intercontinental Cup

The Under-20 Intercontinental (Spanish: Sub-20 Intercontinental, Portuguese: Intercontinental de Sub-20), commonly referred as Under-20 Intercontinental Cup, is an annual one-off football match organised by CONMEBOL and UEFA and contested by the winners of the South American and European youth club competitions, the U-20 Copa Libertadores and UEFA Youth League, respectively. The youth competition is an equivalent to the former Intercontinental Cup, which featured the senior club champions of Europe and South America.

The competition was launched in 2022 as part of a renewed partnership between CONMEBOL and UEFA, with the Portuguese side Benfica winning the first edition in 2022.

== History ==
On 12 February 2020, UEFA and CONMEBOL signed a renewed memorandum of understanding meant to enhance cooperation between the two organisations. As part of the agreement, a joint UEFA–CONMEBOL committee examined the possibility of staging European–South American intercontinental matches, for both men's and women's football and across various age groups. On 15 December 2021, UEFA and CONMEBOL again signed a renewed memorandum of understanding lasting until 2028, which included specific provisions on opening a joint office in London and the potential organisation of various football events.

The official opening of the Joint UEFA and CONMEBOL Representation Office was held on 4 April 2022, where representatives of both confederations and Uruguayan club Peñarol met to agree on the creation of the Under-20 Intercontinental Cup. This was confirmed by Peñarol on 25 April 2022 after another meeting between representatives of UEFA, CONMEBOL and the Peñarol club in Nyon, Switzerland prior to the 2021–22 UEFA Youth League final.

On 2 June 2022, the day after staging the 2022 Finalissima, CONMEBOL and UEFA officially announced a series of new events between teams from the two confederations. This included the first Under-20 Intercontinental Cup, a match between the winners of South America's U-20 Copa Libertadores, an under-20 competition, and the winners of Europe's UEFA Youth League, an under-19 competition. The first winners of the competition were Portuguese club Benfica, winners of the 2021–22 UEFA Youth League, who defeated South American side Peñarol, winners of the 2022 U-20 Copa Libertadores, after a 1–0 victory at the Estadio Centenario in Montevideo, Uruguay.

== Winners ==
List of Under-20 Intercontinental Cup matches
Ed.	Year	Winners	Score	Runners-up	Venue	Location	Attendance
1	2022	(Portugal) Benfica	1–0	(Uruguay) Peñarol	Estadio Centenario	Montevideo, Uruguay	40,579
2	2023	(Argentina) Boca Juniors	1–1 (4–1 p)	(Netherlands) AZ	La Bombonera	Buenos Aires, Argentina	37,386
3	2024	(Brazil) Flamengo	2–1	(Greece) Olympiacos	Maracanã	Rio de Janeiro, Brazil	31,237
4	2025	(Brazil) Flamengo	2–2 (6–5 p)	(Spain) Barcelona	Maracanã	Rio de Janeiro, Brazil	45,656
5	2026	(Spain) Real Madrid	3–1	(Chile) Santiago Wanderers	Bernabéu	Madrid, Spain	52,117

== Performances ==
=== By club ===
Performances in the Under-20 Intercontinental Cup by club
Club	Title(s)	Runners-up	Years won	Years runner-up
(Brazil) Flamengo	2	0	2024, 2025	—
(Portugal) Benfica	1	0	2022	—
(Argentina) Boca Juniors	1	0	2023	—
(Spain) Real Madrid	1	0	2026	—
(Uruguay) Peñarol	0	1	—	2022
(Netherlands) AZ	0	1	—	2023
(Greece) Olympiacos	0	1	—	2024
(Spain) Barcelona	0	1	—	2025
(Chile) Santiago Wanderers	0	1	—	2026

=== By nation ===
Performances by nation
Nation	Titles	Runners-up	Total
Brazil	2	0	2
Spain	1	1	2
Argentina	1	0	1
Portugal	1	0	1
Greece	0	1	1
Netherlands	0	1	1
Uruguay	0	1	1
Chile	0	1	1

=== By confederation ===
Results by confederation
Confederation	Winners	Runners-up
CONMEBOL	3	2
UEFA	2	3

== See also ==
- Intercontinental Cup (1960–2004)
- UEFA–CONMEBOL MoU
  - Finalissima
  - Women's Finalissima
  - Futsal Finalissima
  - UEFA–CONMEBOL Club Challenge
  - Under-20 Intercontinental Cup
