= 2022 Campeonato Carioca =

Campeonato Carioca
- Season: 2022
- Dates: 25 January - 2 April 2022
- Champions: Fluminense (32nd title)
- Relegated: Volta Redonda
- Copa do Brasil: Botafogo; Nova Iguaçu; Resende; Vasco da Gama
- Série D: Nova Iguaçu; Resende
- Matches: 78
- Goals: 189 (2.42 per match)
- Top goalscorer: Gabriel Barbosa (9 goals)

The 2022 Campeonato Carioca de Futebol (officially the Cariocão Betfair 2022 for sponsorship reasons) was the 119th edition of the top division of football in the state of Rio de Janeiro. The competition was organized by FERJ. It began on 25 January 2022 and ended on 2 April 2022. Fluminense defeated the defending champions Flamengo on aggregate 3–1 to win their 32nd title.

== Participating teams ==
Location of teams in 2022 Campeonato Carioca
Location of teams in 2022 Campeonato Carioca – city of Rio de Janeiro

Club	Home City	Manager	2021 Result
Audax Rio de Janeiro Esporte Clube	Angra dos Reis	Alex Alves and Júnior Lopes	1st (Série A2)
Bangu Atlético Clube	Rio de Janeiro (Bangu)	Felipe Loureiro	11th
Boavista Sport Club	Saquarema	Leandrão	10th
Botafogo de Futebol e Regatas	Rio de Janeiro (Engenho de Dentro) (Note: Although Botafogo FR is headquartered in Botafogo, it plays home games at Engenhão Stadium)	Enderson Moreira and Lúcio Flávio (interim)	6th
Clube de Regatas do Flamengo	Rio de Janeiro (Maracanã) (Note: Although CR Flamengo is headquartered in Lagoa, it plays home games at Maracanã Stadium)	Paulo Sousa	1st
Fluminense Football Club	Rio de Janeiro (Maracanã) (Note: Although Fluminense FC is headquartered in Laranjeiras, it plays home games at Maracanã Stadium)	Abel Braga	2nd
Madureira Esporte Clube	Rio de Janeiro (Madureira)	Alfredo Sampaio	8th
Nova Iguaçu Futebol Clube	Nova Iguaçu	Carlos Vitor	7th
Associação Atlética Portuguesa	Rio de Janeiro (Governador Island)	Marcus Paulo Grippi and Toninho Andrade	3rd
Resende Futebol Clube	Resende	Sandro Sargentim	9th
Club de Regatas Vasco da Gama	Rio de Janeiro (Vasco da Gama)	Zé Ricardo	5th
Volta Redonda Futebol Clube	Volta Redonda	Neto Colucci and Wilson Leite (interim)	4th

== Format ==
In the main competition, the twelve clubs played each other in a single round-robin. This round-robin was the Taça Guanabara. The last placed club was relegated to the 2022 Série A2. While the top four clubs qualified for the final stage, the next four clubs (5th to 8th places) qualified for the Taça Rio. In the Taça Rio, the 5th-placed club faced the 8th-placed club, and the 6th-placed faced the 7th-placed. In the final stage, the winners of the Taça Guanabara faced the 4th-placed club, while the runners-up faced the 3rd-placed club. In both of these four-team brackets (the Taça Rio and the final stage), the semifinals and finals were played over two legs, without the use of the away goals rule. In the semifinals of both the Taça Rio and the final stage, the better placed teams on the Taça Guanabara table would advance in case of an aggregate tie. In the finals of both brackets, there were no such advantage; in case of an aggregate tie, a penalty shoot-out would take place.

== Taça Guanabara ==
Pos	Team	Pld	W	D	L	GF	GA	GD	Pts	Qualification or relegation
1	Fluminense (C)	11	9	1	1	16	2	+14	28	Taça Guanabara Champions and advance to semifinals
2	Flamengo	11	8	2	1	27	8	+19	26	Advance to semifinals
3	Vasco da Gama	11	7	1	3	19	11	+8	22	Advance to semifinals
4	Botafogo	11	6	2	3	24	16	+8	20	Advance to semifinals
5	Nova Iguaçu	11	4	2	5	11	15	−4	14	Advance to Taça Rio semifinals
6	Portuguesa	11	3	3	5	11	12	−1	12	Advance to Taça Rio semifinals
7	Resende	11	3	3	5	11	17	−6	12	Advance to Taça Rio semifinals
8	Audax Rio	11	3	2	6	9	14	−5	11	Advance to Taça Rio semifinals
9	Madureira	11	3	2	6	9	17	−8	11	
10	Boavista (Note: Boavista were deducted four points.)	11	3	4	4	13	16	−3	9	
11	Bangu	11	2	3	6	5	17	−12	9	
12	Volta Redonda (R)	11	1	3	7	11	21	−10	6	Relegated

Source: FERJ
Rules for classification: 1) points; 2) wins; 3) goal difference; 4) goals scored; 5) head-to-head results; 6) disciplinary record; 7) random draw.
(C) Champions; (R) Relegated
Notes:

2022 Taça Guanabara champions
Fluminense
11th title

== Taça Rio – Final stage ==
Semi-finals
7	Resende	1	2	3
6	Portuguesa	0	2	2
8	Audax Rio	1	1	2
5	Nova Iguaçu	2	2	4

Finals
7	Resende (p)	1	0	1 (4)
5	Nova Iguaçu	1	0	1 (2)

2022 Taça Rio champions
Resende
1st title

== Final stage ==
Semi-finals
3	Vasco da Gama	0	0	0
2	Flamengo	1	1	2
4	Botafogo	0	2	2
1	Fluminense	1	1	2

Finals
2	Flamengo	0	1	1
1	Fluminense	2	1	3

=== Semi-finals ===
==== Group A ====
21 March 2022
20:00

Botafogo	0–1	Fluminense
	Report	Arias 82'

Estádio Olímpico Nilton Santos, Rio de Janeiro
Attendance: 8,422
Referee: Grazianni Maciel Rocha

27 March 2022
16:00

Fluminense	1–2	Botafogo
Cano 90+6'	Report	Erison 45+2', 90'

Maracanã, Rio de Janeiro
Attendance: 28,538
Referee: Paulo Renato Moreira da Silva Coelho

==== Group B ====
16 March 2022
20:00

Vasco da Gama	0–1	Flamengo
	Report	Gabriel Barbosa 41' (pen.)

Maracanã, Rio de Janeiro
Attendance: 37,867
Referee: Felipe da Silva Gonçalves Paludo

20 March 2022
16:00

Flamengo	1–0	Vasco da Gama
Willian Arão 53'	Report

Maracanã, Rio de Janeiro
Attendance: 58,478
Referee: Rafael Martins de Sá

=== Finals ===
30 March 2022
21:40

Flamengo	0–2	Fluminense
	Report	Cano 82', 84'

Maracanã, Rio de Janeiro
Attendance: 52,821
Referee: Wagner do Nascimento Magalhães

Flamengo	Fluminense

GK	45	(Brazil) Hugo Souza
DF	15	(Brazil) Fabrício Bruno		(substituted off) 81'
DF	23	(Brazil) David Luiz	(yellow card) 45+2'
DF	16	(Brazil) Filipe Luís
MF	34	(Brazil) Matheuzinho		(substituted off) 81'
MF	5	(Brazil) Willian Arão
MF	35	(Brazil) João Gomes	(yellow card) 31'
MF	7	(Brazil) Éverton Ribeiro (c)	(yellow card) 33'	(substituted off) 56'
MF	11	(Brazil) Vitinho	(yellow card) 20'	(substituted off) 39'
MF	31	(Brazil) Marinho	(yellow card) 12'	(substituted off) 56'
FW	9	(Brazil) Gabriel Barbosa
Substitutes:
GK	1	(Brazil) Diego Alves
DF	2	(Brazil) Gustavo Henrique
DF	4	(Brazil) Léo Pereira		(substituted in) 81'
DF	6	(Brazil) Renê
DF	44	(Chile) Mauricio Isla
MF	8	(Brazil) Thiago Maia
MF	10	(Brazil) Diego
MF	14	(Uruguay) Giorgian de Arrascaeta		(substituted in) 56'
MF	18	(Brazil) Andreas Pereira
FW	13	(Brazil) Lázaro		(substituted in) 81'
FW	21	(Brazil) Pedro		(substituted in) 56'
FW	27	(Brazil) Bruno Henrique		(substituted in) 39'
Coach:
(Portugal) Paulo Sousa

GK	12	(Brazil) Fábio
DF	31	(Brazil) Calegari		(substituted off) 87'
DF	26	(Brazil) Manoel
DF	52	(Brazil) Felipe Melo	(yellow card) 6'	(substituted off) 67'
DF	44	(Brazil) David Braz
DF	15	(Brazil) Cristiano	(yellow card) 50'
MF	7	(Brazil) André
MF	20	(Brazil) Yago Felipe (c)
MF	10	(Brazil) Ganso	(yellow card) 62'	(substituted off) 63'
FW	14	(Argentina) Germán Cano
FW	17	(Brazil) Willian		(substituted off) 63'
Substitutes:
GK	1	(Brazil) Marcos Felipe
DF	2	(Brazil) Samuel Xavier
DF	4	(Brazil) Luccas Claro		(substituted in) 67'
DF	6	(Ecuador) Mario Pineida
DF	29	(Brazil) David Duarte
MF	5	(Brazil) Wellington
MF	8	(Brazil) Nonato		(substituted in) 87'
MF	13	(Brazil) Nathan
MF	21	(Colombia) Jhon Arias	(yellow card) 73'	(substituted in) 63'
MF	38	(Brazil) Martinelli	(yellow card) 75'	(substituted in) 63'
FW	37	(Brazil) Matheus Martins
FW	70	(Brazil) Caio Paulista
Coach:
(Brazil) Abel Braga

Assistant referees:
Luiz Cláudio Regazone
Thiago Rosa de Oliveira Esposito
Fourth official:
Daniel Wilson Barbosa de Castro
Fifth official:
Lilian da Silva Fernandes Bruno
Video assistant referee:
Carlos Eduardo Nunes Braga
Assistant video assistant referees:
Pathrice Wallace Corrêa Maia
Diogo Carvalho Silva

2 April 2022
18:00

Fluminense	1–1	Flamengo
Cano 43'	Report	Gabriel Barbosa 28'

Maracanã, Rio de Janeiro
Attendance: 69,760
Referee: Bruno Arleu de Araújo

Fluminense	Flamengo

GK	12	(Brazil) Fábio
DF	26	(Brazil) Manoel
DF	33	(Brazil) Nino
DF	44	(Brazil) David Braz	(yellow card) 37'
MF	31	(Brazil) Calegari		(substituted off) 68'
MF	7	(Brazil) André	(yellow card) 53'
MF	20	(Brazil) Yago Felipe (c)		(substituted off) 79'
MF	10	(Brazil) Ganso		(substituted off) 68'
MF	15	(Brazil) Cristiano	(yellow card) 46'
FW	21	(Colombia) Jhon Arias		(substituted off) 72'
FW	14	(Argentina) Germán Cano		(substituted off) 79'
Substitutes:
GK	1	(Brazil) Marcos Felipe
DF	2	(Brazil) Samuel Xavier
DF	4	(Brazil) Luccas Claro
DF	6	(Ecuador) Mario Pineida
DF	29	(Brazil) David Duarte		(substituted in) 68'
MF	5	(Brazil) Wellington
MF	8	(Brazil) Nonato		(substituted in) 79'
MF	13	(Brazil) Nathan
MF	38	(Brazil) Martinelli		(substituted in) 68'
FW	9	(Brazil) Fred	(red card) 90+1'	(substituted in) 79'
FW	11	(Brazil) Luiz Henrique	(yellow card) 90+4'	(substituted in) 72'
FW	17	(Brazil) Willian
Coach:
(Brazil) Abel Braga

GK	45	(Brazil) Hugo Souza
DF	2	(Brazil) Gustavo Henrique		(substituted off) 74'
DF	23	(Brazil) David Luiz	(yellow card) 22'
DF	16	(Brazil) Filipe Luís (c)	(yellow card) 61'
MF	22	(Brazil) Rodinei		(substituted off) 63'
MF	35	(Brazil) João Gomes	(yellow card) 80'
MF	18	(Brazil) Andreas Pereira		(substituted off) 52'
MF	14	(Uruguay) Giorgian de Arrascaeta
MF	13	(Brazil) Lázaro		(substituted off) 63'
FW	27	(Brazil) Bruno Henrique	(red card) 90+1'
FW	9	(Brazil) Gabriel Barbosa	(yellow card) 21'
Substitutes:
GK	1	(Brazil) Diego Alves
DF	4	(Brazil) Léo Pereira
DF	15	(Brazil) Fabrício Bruno
DF	34	(Brazil) Matheuzinho		(substituted in) 63'
DF	44	(Chile) Mauricio Isla
MF	5	(Brazil) Willian Arão		(substituted in) 74'
MF	7	(Brazil) Éverton Ribeiro		(substituted in) 52'
MF	8	(Brazil) Thiago Maia
MF	10	(Brazil) Diego
MF	42	(Brazil) Matheus França
FW	21	(Brazil) Pedro	(yellow card) 90+6'	(substituted in) 63'
FW	31	(Brazil) Marinho
Coach:
(Portugal) Paulo Sousa

Assistant referees:
Daniel do Espírito Santo Parro
Carlos Henrique Alves de Lima Filho
Fourth official:
João Batista de Arruda
Fifth official:
Thiago Gomes Magalhães
Video assistant referee:
Carlos Eduardo Nunes Braga
Assistant video assistant referees:
Pathrice Wallace Corrêa Maia
Diogo Carvalho Silva

2022 Campeonato Carioca champions
Fluminense
32nd title

== Torneio Independência ==
The Torneio Independência was contested by all the teams participating in the Campeonato Carioca except the "Big Four" of Rio de Janeiro (Botafogo, Flamengo, Fluminense and Vasco da Gama). Their standings were based in the results of the Taça Guanabara excluding all the matches played against the Big Four. The top two teams qualified for the 2023 Copa do Brasil, while the winners won the José Luiz de Magalhães Lins Filho Trophy.

Pos	Team	Pld	W	D	L	GF	GA	GD	Pts	Qualification
1	Nova Iguaçu (C)	7	4	2	1	9	4	+5	14	Qualify for 2023 Copa do Brasil
2	Resende	7	3	2	2	8	6	+2	11	Qualify for 2023 Copa do Brasil
3	Madureira	7	3	2	2	5	7	−2	11	
4	Boavista	7	3	1	3	11	11	0	10	
5	Audax Rio	7	3	1	3	6	8	−2	10	
6	Portuguesa	7	2	3	2	5	5	0	9	
7	Bangu	7	1	3	3	4	7	−3	6	
8	Volta Redonda	7	1	2	4	9	9	0	5	

Source: FERJ
Rules for classification: 1) points; 2) wins; 3) goal difference; 4) goals scored; 5) head-to-head results; 6) disciplinary record; 7) random draw.
(C) Champions

== Overall table ==
Pos	Team	Pld	W	D	L	GF	GA	GD	Pts	Qualification or relegation
1	Fluminense (Note: Fluminense won the Taça Guanabara. They qualified for the Copa do Brasil via the 2022 Campeonato Brasileiro Série A.)	11	9	1	1	16	2	+14	28	Champions and 2023 Copa do Brasil
2	Flamengo (Note: Flamengo qualified for the Copa do Brasil by winning the 2022 Copa Libertadores.)	11	8	2	1	27	8	+19	26	Runners-up and 2023 Copa do Brasil
3	Vasco da Gama	11	7	1	3	19	11	+8	22	2023 Copa do Brasil
4	Botafogo	11	6	2	3	24	16	+8	20	2023 Copa do Brasil
5	Resende (Note: Resende won the Taça Rio.)	11	3	3	5	11	17	−6	12	2023 Copa do Brasil and 2023 Série D (Note: Nova Iguaçu and Resende qualified for the Copa do Brasil as Torneio Independência champions and runners-up, respectively.)
6	Nova Iguaçu (Note: Nova Iguaçu won the Torneio Independência.)	11	4	2	5	11	15	−4	14	2023 Copa do Brasil and 2023 Série D
7	Portuguesa (Note: Portuguesa qualified for the Série D via the 2022 Copa Rio.)	11	3	3	5	11	12	−1	12	2023 Série D
8	Audax Rio	11	3	2	6	9	14	−5	11	
9	Madureira	11	3	2	6	9	17	−8	11	
10	Boavista (Note: Boavista were deducted four points.)	11	3	4	4	13	16	−3	9	
11	Bangu	11	2	3	6	5	17	−12	9	
12	Volta Redonda (Note: Volta Redonda qualified for the Copa do Brasil by winning the 2022 Copa Rio.)	11	1	3	7	11	21	−10	6	Relegation to 2022 Série A2 and 2023 Copa do Brasil

Source: FERJ

== Top goalscorers ==
Rank	Player	Team	Goals
1	(Brazil) Gabriel Barbosa	Flamengo	9
2	(Brazil) Erison	Botafogo	8
3	(Argentina) Germán Cano	Fluminense	7
4	(Brazil) Samuel Granada	Nova Iguaçu	6
5	(Uruguay) Giorgian de Arrascaeta	Flamengo	5
5	(Brazil) Matheus Nascimento	Botafogo	5
5	(Brazil) Nenê	Vasco da Gama	5
5	(Brazil) Raniel	Vasco da Gama	5
