= 2022 CR Flamengo season =

Flamengo
2022 season
- President: Rodolfo Landim
- Head coach: Paulo Sousa (until 9 June 2022); Dorival Júnior (since 10 June 2022)
- Stadium: Maracanã
- Série A: 5th
- Campeonato Carioca: Runners-up
- Copa do Brasil: Winners
- Copa Libertadores: Winners
- Supercopa do Brasil: Runners-up
- Top goalscorer: League: Gabriel Barbosa; Pedro (11 goals each); All: Pedro; Gabriel Barbosa (29 goals each)
- Highest home attendance: 69,997 (20 April 2022 vs Palmeiras, Série A)
- Lowest home attendance: 3,116 (26 January 2022 vs Portuguesa, Campeonato Carioca)
- Average home league attendance: 54,599
Home colours	Away colours	Third colours

The 2022 season was Clube de Regatas do Flamengo's 127th year of existence, their 111th football season, and their 52nd in the Campeonato Brasileiro Série A, having never been relegated from the top division. In addition to the 2022 Campeonato Brasileiro Série A, Flamengo also competed in the Supercopa do Brasil, CONMEBOL Copa Libertadores, the Copa do Brasil, and the Campeonato Carioca, the top tier of Rio de Janeiro's state football.

The season debut took place against Portuguesa-RJ, in the 1st round of the Taça Guanabara — main phase of the Campeonato Carioca — on January 26, but with younger players. The debut of the main team took place on February 2, in the 3rd round of the Taça Guanabara, against Boavista-RJ. They were runners-up of the Taça Guanabara. In the Carioca finals, they ended up runners-up after a 2–0 defeat and a 1–1 draw against Fluminense.

In the Supercopa do Brasil, they tied in normal time by 2–2 and lost the title in the penalty shoot-out to Atlético Mineiro by 8–7, being, therefore, runner-up.

== Kits ==
On 18 February 2022 Flamengo unveiled its new home kit for the 2022 season with the debut date set to be on 20 February 2022 in the Supercopa do Brasil against Atlético Mineiro.

On 26 April 2022 Flamengo unveiled the goalkeeper's kit for the 2022 season, three days later on 29 April 2022 the club revealed the away kit, although images were leaked weeks before. The club debuted both uniforms two days later in a Copa do Brasil match against Altos.

On 12 August 2022 Flamengo unveiled its third kit. The club debuted this kit on 14 August 2022 against Athletico Paranaense at Maracanã, Flamengo won 5–0.

Supplier: Adidas
Sponsors: Banco BRB (Main sponsor) / Mercado Livre (Back of the shirt) / Assist Card (Lower back) / Pixbet (Shoulder) / Havan (Sleeves) / TIM (Numbers) / ABC da Construção (Shorts) / Luvix (Socks)

Home	Home alternate	Away	Away alternate	Third	Third alternate	Third alternate 2
Goalkeeper	Goalkeeper alternate	Goalkeeper alternate 2

== Competitions ==
=== Overview ===
Competition	First match	Last match	Starting round	Final position	Record							
Competition	First match	Last match	Starting round	Final position	Pld	W	D	L	GF	GA	GD	Win %
Série A	9 April 2022	12 November 2022	Matchday 1	5th	38	18	8	12	60	39	+21	47.37
Copa do Brasil	1 May 2022	19 October 2022	Third round	Winners	10	6	3	1	13	5	+8	60.00
Campeonato Carioca	26 January 2022	2 April 2022	Matchday 1	Runners-up	15	10	3	2	30	11	+19	66.67
Copa Libertadores	5 April 2022	29 October 2022	Group stage	Winners	13	12	1	0	33	8	+25	92.31
Supercopa do Brasil	20 February 2022		Final	Runners-up	1	0	1	0	2	2	+0	0.00
Total					77	46	16	15	138	65	+73	59.74

Source: Competitions

=== Supercopa do Brasil ===
Flamengo qualified for the 2022 Supercopa do Brasil as runner-up in the 2021 Campeonato Brasileiro, due to Atlético Mineiro titles in the 2021 Campeonato Brasileiro and in the 2021 Copa do Brasil.

Goals and red cards are shown.

20 February 2022 Final	Atlético Mineiro	2–2 (8–7 p)	Flamengo	Cuiabá
16:00 UTC−3	Fernández 42'; Hulk 75' (Vargas)	Report	Gabriel 56'; Bruno Henrique	Stadium: Arena Pantanal; Attendance: 32,028; Referee: Anderson Daronco
	Penalties
	Hulk (penalty scored); Fernández (penalty scored); Ademir (penalty scored); Arana (penalty scored); Vargas (penalty scored); Guga (penalty missed); Jair (penalty scored); Everson (penalty missed); Silva (penalty scored); Mariano (penalty missed); Godín (penalty missed); Hulk (penalty scored)		(penalty scored) Lázaro; (penalty scored) Vitinho; (penalty scored) Diego; (penalty scored) David Luiz; (penalty scored) Gabriel; (penalty missed) Arão; (penalty scored) Gomes; (penalty missed) Matheuzinho; (penalty scored) L. Pereira; (penalty missed) Fabrício Bruno; (penalty missed) Hugo; (penalty missed) Vitinho

=== Campeonato Carioca ===
==== Taça Guanabara ====
Pos	Team	Pld	W	D	L	GF	GA	GD	Pts	Qualification
1	Fluminense (C, Q)	11	9	1	1	16	2	+14	28	Taça Guanabara Champion and advance to semifinals
2	Flamengo (Q)	11	8	2	1	27	8	+19	26	Advance to semifinals
3	Vasco da Gama (Q)	11	7	1	3	19	11	+8	22	Advance to semifinals
4	Botafogo (Q)	11	6	2	3	24	16	+8	20	Advance to semifinals
5	Nova Iguaçu (Q)	11	4	2	5	11	15	−4	14	Advance to Taça Rio semifinals
6	Portuguesa (Q)	11	3	3	5	11	12	−1	12	Advance to Taça Rio semifinals
7	Resende (Q)	11	3	3	5	11	17	−6	12	Advance to Taça Rio semifinals
8	Audax Rio (Q)	11	3	2	6	9	14	−5	11	Advance to Taça Rio semifinals
9	Madureira	11	3	2	6	9	17	−8	11	
10	Boavista	11	3	4	4	13	16	−3	6	
11	Bangu	11	2	3	6	5	17	−12	9	
12	Volta Redonda (R)	11	1	3	7	11	21	−10	6	Relegated

Source: FERJ
Rules for classification: 1) points; 2) wins; 3) goal difference; 4) goals scored; 5) head-to-head results; 6) disciplinary record; 7) random draw.
(C) Champions; (Q) Qualified; (R) Relegated

Goals and red cards are shown.

26 January 2022 1	Flamengo	2–1	Portuguesa	Rio de Janeiro
21:35 UTC−3	Lázaro 5' (pen.), 55'	Report	Sánchez 61'	Stadium: Luso Brasileiro; Attendance: 3,116; Referee: Bruno Arleu de Araújo

29 January 2022 2	Volta Redonda	0–0	Flamengo	Volta Redonda
18:00 UTC−3		Report		Stadium: Raulino de Oliveira; Attendance: N/A; Referee: Grazianni Maciel Rocha

2 February 2022 3	Flamengo	3–0	Boavista	Volta Redonda
19:15 UTC−3	Marinho 24'; Pedro 61'; Gabriel 85'	Report		Stadium: Raulino de Oliveira; Attendance: 9,124; Referee: Maurício Machado Coelho Junior

6 February 2022 4	Flamengo	0–1	Fluminense	Rio de Janeiro
16:00 UTC−3	Vitinho (red card) 80'	Report	Calegari (red card) 80'; Arias 89'	Stadium: Nilton Santos; Attendance: 20,485; Referee: Alexandre Vargas de Jesus

10 February 2022 5	Audax Rio	1–2	Flamengo	Volta Redonda
19:00 UTC−3	Sanches 71'	Report	Gabriel 45+3'; Thomás 54' (o.g.)	Stadium: Raulino de Oliveira; Attendance: 3,002; Referee: Rafael Martins de Sá

13 February 2022 6	Flamengo	5–0	Nova Iguaçu	Volta Redonda
19:00 UTC−3	Gustavo Henrique 4'; de Arrascaeta 41'; Gabriel 74' (pen.); Pedro 88'; Diego 90'	Report		Stadium: Raulino de Oliveira; Attendance: N/A; Referee: Yuri Elino Ferreira da Cruz

16 February 2022 7	Madureira	1–2	Flamengo	Rio de Janeiro
15:30 UTC−3	Ygor Catatau 2'	Report	Ribeiro 59'; Arão 70'	Stadium: Conselheiro Galvão; Attendance: 1,293; Referee: Rodrigo Carvalhaes de Miranda

23 February 2022 8	Botafogo	1–3	Flamengo	Rio de Janeiro
20:00 UTC−3	L. Pereira 85' (o.g.)	Report	Pedro 9'; Gabriel 45+5'; de Arrascaeta 74'	Stadium: Nilton Santos; Attendance: 12,743; Referee: Grazianni Maciel Rocha

27 February 2022 9	Flamengo	2–2	Resende	Rio de Janeiro
16:00 UTC−3	de Arrascaeta 90'; Gabriel 90+5' (pen.)	Report	Biancucchi 30'; Jeffinho 82'	Stadium: Nilton Santos; Attendance: 9,127; Referee: Felipe da Silva Gonçalves Paludo

6 March 2022 10	Flamengo	2–1	Vasco da Gama	Rio de Janeiro
16:00 UTC−3	Filipe Luís 11'; de Arrascaeta 90'	Report	Gabriel Pec 51'	Stadium: Nilton Santos; Attendance: 20,186; Referee: Rafael Martins de Sá

12 March 2022 11	Bangu	0–6	Flamengo	Rio de Janeiro
19:30 UTC−3		Report	de Arrascaeta 9'; Gabriel 14', 90+4'; L. Pereira 45', 83'; França 75'	Stadium: Maracanã; Attendance: 63,450; Referee: Bruno Mota Correia

==== Semi-finals ====
16 March 2022 First leg	Vasco da Gama	0–1	Flamengo	Rio de Janeiro
20:00 UTC−3		Report	Gabriel 45' (pen.)	Stadium: Maracanã; Referee: Felipe da Silva Gonçalves Paludo

20 March 2022 Second leg	Flamengo	1–0 (2–0 agg.)	Vasco da Gama	Rio de Janeiro
16:00 UTC−3	Arão 54'	Report		Stadium: Maracanã; Attendance: 58,478; Referee: Rafael Martins de Sá

==== Finals ====
30 March 2022 First leg	Flamengo	0–2	Fluminense	Rio de Janeiro
21:40 UTC−3		Report	Cano 83', 85'	Stadium: Maracanã; Attendance: 52,821; Referee: Wagner do Nascimento Magalhães

2 April 2022 Second leg	Fluminense	1–1 (3–1 agg.)	Flamengo	Rio de Janeiro
18:00 UTC−3	Cano 43'	Report	Gabriel 28'	Stadium: Maracanã; Attendance: 67,754; Referee: Bruno Arleu de Araújo

=== Copa Libertadores ===
==== Group stage ====
Pos	Team	Pld	W	D	L	GF	GA	GD	Pts	Qualification	FLA	TAL	UCA	CRI
1	(Brazil) Flamengo	6	5	1	0	15	6	+9	16	Round of 16	—	3–1	3–0	2–1
2	(Argentina) Talleres	6	3	2	1	6	5	+1	11	Round of 16	2–2	—	1–0	1–0
3	(Chile) Universidad Católica	6	1	1	4	5	10	−5	4	Copa Sudamericana	2–3	0–1	—	2–1
4	(Peru) Sporting Cristal	6	0	2	4	3	8	−5	2		0–2	0–0	1–1	—

Source: CONMEBOL
Rules for classification: 1) Points; 2) Goal difference; 3) Goals scored; 4) Away goals scored; 5) CONMEBOL ranking.

Goals, assists and red cards are shown.

5 April 2022 1	Sporting Cristal (Peru)	0–2	(Brazil) Flamengo	Lima, Peru
22:00 UTC−3		Report	Bruno Henrique; Matheuzinho	Stadium: Nacional de Lima; Attendance: (closed gates); Referee: Jhon Ospina (Colombia)

12 April 2022 2	Flamengo (Brazil)	3–1	(Argentina) Talleres	Rio de Janeiro, Brazil
21:30 UTC−3	Gabriel 11' (pen.); Ribeiro	Report	Fértoli 45+1' (Girotti)	Stadium: Maracanã; Attendance: 42,915; Referee: Jesús Valenzuela (Venezuela)

28 April 2022 3	Universidad Católica (Chile)	2–3	(Brazil) Flamengo	Santiago, Chile
19:00 UTC−3	Isla 16' (o.g.); Pablo 90+4' (o.g.); Gutiérrez (red card) 86'	Report	Gabriel; Lázaro	Stadium: San Carlos de Apoquindo; Attendance: 10,464; Referee: José Argote (Venezuela)

4 May 2022 4	Talleres (Argentina)	2–2	(Brazil) Flamengo	Córdoba, Argentina
19:00 UTC−3	Arão 34' (o.g.); Santos 57'	Report	de Arrascaeta 50' (Isla); Pedro 69' (Gabriel)	Stadium: Mario Alberto Kempes; Referee: Eber Aquino (Paraguay)

17 May 2022 5	Flamengo (Brazil)	3–0	(Chile) Universidad Católica	Rio de Janeiro, Brazil
21:30 UTC−3	Arão 7' (de Arrascaeta); Ribeiro; Pedro	Report		Stadium: Maracanã; Attendance: 43,532; Referee: Jhon Ospina (Colombia)

24 May 2022 6	Flamengo (Brazil)	2–1	(Peru) Sporting Cristal	Rio de Janeiro, Brazil
21:30 UTC−3	Isla 30'; Pedro 74' (A. Pereira)	Report	Gonzáles 85'	Stadium: Maracanã; Attendance: 38,100; Referee: Alexis Herrera (Venezuela)

==== Round of 16 ====
The draw for the round of 16 was held on 27 May 2022.

Goals, assists and red cards are shown.

29 June 2022 1st leg	Deportes Tolima (Colombia)	0–1	(Brazil) Flamengo	Ibagué, Colombia
21:30 UTC−3		Report	A. Pereira 17'	Stadium: Manuel Murillo Toro; Referee: Jesús Valenzuela (Venezuela)

6 July 2022 2nd leg	Flamengo (Brazil)	7–1 (8–1 agg.)	(Colombia) Deportes Tolima	Rio de Janeiro, Brazil
21:30 UTC−3	Pedro 5' (de Arrascaeta), 47' (David Luiz), 67' (Rodinei), 79'; Quiñones 20' (o.g.); Gabriel 56' (Maia); França	Report	Quiñones 63'	Stadium: Maracanã; Attendance: 61,871; Referee: Mario Díaz de Vivar (Paraguay)

==== Quarter-finals ====
Goals, assists and red cards are shown.

2 August 2022 1st leg	Corinthians (Brazil)	0–2	(Brazil) Flamengo	São Paulo, Brazil
21:30 UTC−3		Report	de Arrascaeta; Gabriel 51' (Rodinei)	Stadium: Neo Química Arena; Attendance: 45,349; Referee: Patricio Loustau (Argentina)

9 August 2022 2nd leg	Flamengo (Brazil)	1–0 (3–0 agg.)	(Brazil) Corinthians	Rio de Janeiro, Brazil
21:30 UTC−3	Pedro 52' (de Arrascaeta)	Report	Méndez (red card) 69'	Stadium: Maracanã; Attendance: 68,418; Referee: Esteban Ostojich (Uruguay)

==== Semi-finals ====
Goals, assists and red cards are shown.

31 August 2022 1st leg	Vélez Sarsfield (Argentina)	0–4	(Brazil) Flamengo	Buenos Aires, Argentina
21:30 UTC−3		Report	Pedro; Ribeiro 45+1' (Gabriel)	Stadium: José Amalfitani; Referee: Wilmar Roldán (Colombia)

7 September 2022 2nd leg	Flamengo (Brazil)	2–1 (6–1 agg.)	(Argentina) Vélez Sarsfield	Rio de Janeiro, Brazil
21:30 UTC−3	Pedro 42' (Ribeiro); Marinho	Report	Pratto 21' (Janson)	Stadium: Maracanã; Attendance: 66,635; Referee: Piero Maza (Chile)

==== Final ====
Goals, assists and red cards are shown.

29 October 2022 Final	Flamengo (Brazil)	1–0	(Brazil) Athletico Paranaense	Guayaquil, Ecuador
17:00 UTC−3	Gabriel 45+4' (Ribeiro)	Report	Pedro Henrique (yellow card) 28' (yellow-red card) 43'	Stadium: Monumental Banco Pichincha; Attendance: 42,517; Referee: Patricio Loustau (Argentina)

=== Campeonato Brasileiro ===
==== League table ====
Pos	Team	Pld	W	D	L	GF	GA	GD	Pts	Qualification or relegation
3	Fluminense	38	21	7	10	63	41	+22	70	Qualification for Copa Libertadores group stage (Note: Flamengo qualified for the Copa Libertadores group stage by winning the 2022 Copa Libertadores. Since they also won the 2022 Copa do Brasil, the berth awarded to the Copa do Brasil champions (Copa Libertadores group stage) was passed over to the league's best placed team not already qualified.)
4	Corinthians	38	18	11	9	44	36	+8	65	Qualification for Copa Libertadores group stage
5	Flamengo	38	18	8	12	60	39	+21	62	Qualification for Copa Libertadores group stage
6	Athletico Paranaense	38	16	10	12	48	48	0	58	Qualification for Copa Libertadores group stage
7	Atlético Mineiro	38	15	13	10	45	37	+8	58	Qualification for Copa Libertadores second stage

Source: CBF
Rules for classification: 1) points; 2) wins; 3) goal difference; 4) goals scored; 5) head-to-head results (only between two teams); 6) fewest red cards; 7) fewest yellow cards; 8) drawing of lots.

==== Results by round ====
Round	1	2	3	4	5	6	7	8	9	10	11	12	13	14	15	16	17	18	19	20	21	22	23	24	25	26	27	28	29	30	31	32	33	34	35	36	37	38
Ground	A	H	A	H	H	A	H	A	H	A	A	H	A	H	A	A	H	H	A	H	A	H	A	A	H	A	H	A	H	H	A	H	A	H	H	A	A	H
Result	D	W	L	D	L	D	W	W	L	L	L	W	L	W	W	L	W	W	W	W	W	W	D	W	D	D	L	L	W	D	W	W	W	W	L	L	D	L
Position	10	4	9	12	14	16	14	8	11	14	16	10	14	9	8	9	7	7	6	5	5	2	3	2	2	3	4	5	5	5	4	3	3	3	3	5	5	5

Source: Matches
A = Away; H = Home; W = Win; D = Draw; L = Loss; P = Postponed

==== Matches ====
Goals, assists and red cards are shown.

9 April 2022 1	Atlético Goianiense	1–1	Flamengo	Goiânia
19:00 UTC−3	Rato 75' (Dudu)	Report	Bruno Henrique 84' (de Arrascaeta)	Stadium: Antônio Accioly; Attendance: 10,496; Referee: Bráulio da Silva Machado

17 April 2022 2	Flamengo	3–1	São Paulo	Rio de Janeiro
16:00 UTC−3	Gabriel; Isla; de Arrascaeta	Report	Calleri	Stadium: Maracanã; Attendance: 54,686; Referee: Anderson Daronco

20 April 2022 4	Flamengo	0–0	Palmeiras	Rio de Janeiro
19:30 UTC−3		Report		Stadium: Maracanã; Attendance: 69,997; Referee: Wilton Sampaio

23 April 2022 3	Athletico Paranaense	1–0	Flamengo	Curitiba
16:30 UTC−3	Terans 32' (pen.)	Report		Stadium: Arena da Baixada; Attendance: 23,644; Referee: Raphael Claus

8 May 2022 5	Flamengo	0–1	Botafogo	Brasília
11:00 UTC−3		Report	Erison 51'	Stadium: Arena BRB Mané Garrincha; Attendance: 54,981; Referee: Anderson Daronco

14 May 2022 6	Ceará	2–2	Flamengo	Fortaleza
16:30 UTC−3	Mendoza; Nino Paraíba 90+1'	Report	Arão 7' (de Arrascaeta), 38' (de Arrascaeta)	Stadium: Arena Castelão; Attendance: 52,139; Referee: Luiz Flávio de Oliveira

21 May 2022 7	Flamengo	1–0	Goiás	Rio de Janeiro
16:30 UTC−3	Pedro	Report		Stadium: Maracanã; Attendance: 51,692; Referee: Bráulio da Silva Machado

29 May 2022 8	Fluminense	1–2	Flamengo	Rio de Janeiro
18:00 UTC−3	Cano; Braz (red card) 90+3'	Report	A. Pereira 34' (de Arrascaeta); Gabriel 57' (A. Pereira); Rodinei (red card) 90+3'	Stadium: Maracanã; Attendance: 57,919; Referee: Raphael Claus

5 June 2022 9	Flamengo	1–2	Fortaleza	Rio de Janeiro
16:00 UTC−3	Ribeiro 45+5' (Ayrton Lucas); Pedro (penalty missed) 51' (pen.)	Report	Robson 28' (Jussa); Hércules 90+2'	Stadium: Maracanã; Attendance: 63,975; Referee: Leandro Vuaden

8 June 2022 10	Red Bull Bragantino	1–0	Flamengo	Bragança Paulista
20:30 UTC−3	Cândido 17', (red card) 70'	Report		Stadium: Nabi Abi Chedid; Attendance: 8,627; Referee: Wilton Sampaio

11 June 2022 11	Internacional	3–1	Flamengo	Porto Alegre
21:00 UTC−3	Wanderson; Pedro Henrique 90+2' (pen.)	Report	A. Pereira	Stadium: Beira-Rio; Attendance: 22,392; Referee: Bráulio da Silva Machado

15 June 2022 12	Flamengo	2–0	Cuiabá	Rio de Janeiro
20:30 UTC−3	Ayrton Lucas; Gabriel 79' (de Arrascaeta)	Report		Stadium: Maracanã; Attendance: 43,930; Referee: Sávio Pereira Sampaio

19 June 2022 13	Atlético Mineiro	2–0	Flamengo	Belo Horizonte
16:00 UTC−3	Fernández 35'; Ademir 85' (Hulk)	Report		Stadium: Mineirão; Attendance: 55,373; Referee: Raphael Claus

25 June 2022 14	Flamengo	3–0	América Mineiro	Rio de Janeiro
19:00 UTC−3	Gabriel, (penalty missed) 51' (pen.); de Arrascaeta 71' (Ribeiro); Marinho 90+1' (Rodinei)	Report		Stadium: Maracanã; Attendance: 42,931; Referee: Ramon Abatti Abel

2 July 2022 15	Santos	1–2	Flamengo	Santos
19:00 UTC−3	Zanocelo 66'	Report	Pedro 18' (Ribeiro); Gabriel 73'	Stadium: Vila Belmiro; Attendance: 12,464; Referee: Anderson Daronco

10 July 2022 16	Corinthians	1–0	Flamengo	São Paulo
16:00 UTC−3	Rodinei 52' (o.g.)	Report		Stadium: Neo Química Arena; Attendance: 44,050; Referee: Ramon Abatti Abel

16 July 2022 17	Flamengo	2–0	Coritiba	Brasília
19:00 UTC−3	Gustavo Henrique; Diego	Report		Stadium: Arena BRB Mané Garrincha; Attendance: 33,778; Referee: Flávio Rodrigues de Souza

20 July 2022 18	Flamengo	4–0	Juventude	Brasília
20:30 UTC−3	Pedro 6' (de Arrascaeta), 13' (Ribeiro); Ribeiro 18' (Gabriel); Lázaro 86' (Everton)	Report	Jadson (red card) 34'	Stadium: Arena BRB Mané Garrincha; Attendance: 65,392; Referee: Paulo César Zanovelli

24 July 2022 19	Avaí	1–2	Flamengo	Florianópolis
11:00 UTC−3	Chaves	Report	Pedro 55', 84' (de Arrascaeta)	Stadium: Ressacada; Attendance: 17,557; Referee: Raphael Claus

30 July 2022 20	Flamengo	4–1	Atlético Goianiense	Rio de Janeiro
20:30	Lázaro; Marinho 23' (Vidal); Vidal 32' (pen.); Victor Hugo 45+5' (Ayrton Lucas)	Report	Rato 82'; Luiz Fernando (red card) 85'	Stadium: Maracanã; Attendance: 64.040; Referee: Caio Max Augusto Vieira

6 August 2022 21	São Paulo	0–2	Flamengo	São Paulo
20:30 UTC−3		Report	Lázaro 7'; Gabriel 90+5' (Ribeiro)	Stadium: Morumbi; Attendance: 45,217; Referee: Ramon Abatti Abel

14 August 2022 22	Flamengo	5–0	Athletico Paranaense	Rio de Janeiro
16:00	Fabrício Bruno; Ayrton Lucas; Lázaro; Pedro 90+2' (de Arrascaeta)	Report		Stadium: Maracanã; Attendance: 62,716; Referee: Wilton Sampaio

21 August 2022 23	Palmeiras	1–1	Flamengo	São Paulo
16:00 UTC−3	Veiga	Report	Victor Hugo 29' (Ayrton Lucas)	Stadium: Allianz Parque; Attendance: 40,531; Referee: Ramon Abatti Abel

28 August 2022 24	Botafogo	0–1	Flamengo	Rio de Janeiro
18:00 UTC−3		Report	Vidal	Stadium: Nilton Santos; Attendance: 14,442; Referee: Flávio Rodrigues de Souza

4 September 2022 25	Flamengo	1–1	Ceará	Rio de Janeiro
11:00 UTC−3	Gabriel 53', (red card) 90+4'	Report	Jô 45' (Mendoza), (red card) 62'	Stadium: Maracanã; Attendance: 64,387; Referee: Paulo César Zanovelli

11 September 2022 26	Goiás	1–1	Flamengo	Goiânia
19:00 UTC−3	Diego 80' (Pedro Raul)	Report	França	Stadium: Serrinha; Attendance: 13,798; Referee: Ramon Abatti Abel

18 September 2022 27	Flamengo	1–2	Fluminense	Rio de Janeiro
16:00 UTC−3	Gabriel 83' (Everton); Marinho (red card) 86'; Everton (red card) 90'	Report	Braz (yellow card) 6' (yellow-red card) 6'; Ganso 45' (pen.); Nathan 76' (Martinelli); Manoel (red card) 86'; Caio (red card) 90'	Stadium: Maracanã; Attendance: 55,170; Referee: Raphael Claus

28 September 2022 28	Fortaleza	3–2	Flamengo	Fortaleza
19:00 UTC−3	Pedro Rocha; Caio Alexandre 90+4'	Report	Gabriel 32', 45+5' (pen.)	Stadium: Arena Castelão; Attendance: 46,299; Referee: Flávio Rodrigues de Souza

1 October 2022 29	Flamengo	4–1	Red Bull Bragantino	Rio de Janeiro
19:00 UTC−3	Gabriel 12' (de Arrascaeta); Pedro 66' (Everton), 70' (de Arrascaeta), 71' (Ayrton Lucas)	Report	Cândido (red card) 4'; Helinho 48' (pen.)	Stadium: Maracanã; Attendance: 46,698; Referee: Anderson Daronco

5 October 2022 30	Flamengo	0–0	Internacional	Rio de Janeiro
21:30 UTC−3		Report		Stadium: Maracanã; Attendance: 43,710; Referee: Flávio Rodrigues de Souza

8 October 2022 31	Cuiabá	1–2	Flamengo	Cuiabá
19:00 UTC−3	Gava 90+4'	Report	França; Marinho 68' (pen.)	Stadium: Arena Pantanal; Attendance: 40,059; Referee: Raphael Claus

15 October 2022 32	Flamengo	1–0	Atlético Mineiro	Rio de Janeiro
20:30 UTC−3	Everton 38' (Fabrício Bruno)	Report		Stadium: Maracanã; Attendance: 51,179; Referee: Ramon Abatti Abel

22 October 2022 33	América Mineiro	1–2	Flamengo	Belo Horizonte
19:00 UTC−3	Everaldo	Report	França; Everton 24'	Stadium: Independência; Attendance: N/A; Referee: Jean Pierre Gonçalves Lima

25 October 2022 34	Flamengo	3–2	Santos	Rio de Janeiro
21:45 UTC−3	Pedro; Marinho 78'; de Arrascaeta 87' (Ayrton Lucas)	Report	Alex 53' (Camacho); Carabajal 90+7' (Seco)	Stadium: Maracanã; Attendance: 44,679; Referee: André Luiz de Freitas Castro

2 November 2022 35	Flamengo	1–2	Corinthians	Rio de Janeiro
21:30 UTC−3	França 48' (Everton)	Report	Queiroz 43' (Vital); Yuri Alberto 75' (Méndez)	Stadium: Maracanã; Attendance: 60,369; Referee: Ramon Abatti Abel

6 November 2022 36	Coritiba	1–0	Flamengo	Curitiba
16:00 UTC−3	Alef Manga 58' (pen.)	Report		Stadium: Couto Pereira; Attendance: 32,021; Referee: Raphael Claus

9 November 2022 37	Juventude	2–2	Flamengo	Caxias do Sul
21:30 UTC−3	Paulo Henrique; Jadson	Report	Matheuzinho 1' (Everton); Werton 90+1' (Ayrton Lucas)	Stadium: Alfredo Jaconi; Attendance: 5,231; Referee: Rodrigo José Pereira de Lima

12 November 2022 38	Flamengo	1–2	Avaí	Rio de Janeiro
16:00 UTC−3	Wellington 42' (o.g.)	Report	Marcinho 45+5'; Lipe 79'	Stadium: Maracanã; Attendance: 63,077; Referee: Edina Alves Batista

=== Copa do Brasil ===
As Flamengo will participate in the 2022 Copa Libertadores, the club entered the Copa do Brasil in the third round.

==== Third round ====
Goals, assists and red cards are shown.

1 May 2022 1st leg	Altos	1–2	Flamengo	Teresina
18:00 UTC−3	Manoel 63'	Report	Pedro 66'; Gomes 80'	Stadium: Albertão; Attendance: 30,460; Referee: Flávio Rodrigues de Souza

11 May 2022 2nd leg	Flamengo	2–0 (4–1 agg.)	Altos	Volta Redonda
19:30 UTC−3	Gabriel 59' (pen.); Victor Hugo 86'	Report		Stadium: Raulino de Oliveira; Attendance: 13,077; Referee: Douglas Marques das Flores

==== Round of 16 ====
Goals, assists and red cards are shown.

22 June 2022 1st leg	Atlético Mineiro	2–1	Flamengo	Belo Horizonte
21:30 UTC−3	Hulk; Ademir 55' (Hulk)	Report	Lázaro 80' (Rodinei)	Stadium: Mineirão; Attendance: 53,953; Referee: Luiz Flávio de Oliveira

13 July 2022 2nd leg	Flamengo	2–0 (3–2 agg.)	Atlético Mineiro	Rio de Janeiro
21:30 UTC−3	de Arrascaeta	Report	Alonso (red card) 78'	Stadium: Maracanã; Attendance: 68,747; Referee: Wilton Sampaio

==== Quarter-finals ====
Goals, assists and red cards are shown.

27 July 2022 1st leg	Flamengo	0–0	Athletico Paranaense	Rio de Janeiro
21:30 UTC−3	David Luiz (red card) 90+7'	Report		Stadium: Maracanã; Attendance: 65,271; Referee: Luiz Flávio de Oliveira

17 August 2022 2nd leg	Athletico Paranaense	0–1 (0–1 agg.)	Flamengo	Curitiba
21:30 UTC−3		Report	Pedro 57' (Rodinei)	Stadium: Arena da Baixada; Attendance: 39,360; Referee: Raphael Claus

==== Semi-finals ====
Goals, assists and red cards are shown.

24 August 2022 1st leg	São Paulo	1–3	Flamengo	São Paulo
21:30 UTC−3	Nestor 79' (Igor Vinícius)	Report	Gomes 12' (Ribeiro); Gabriel 67'; Everton 90+4' (de Arrascaeta)	Stadium: Morumbi; Attendance: 51,365; Referee: Anderson Daronco

14 September 2022 2nd leg	Flamengo	1–0 (4–1 agg.)	São Paulo	Rio de Janeiro
21:45 UTC−3	de Arrascaeta 36' (Ribeiro)	Report		Stadium: Maracanã; Attendance: 62,977; Referee: Wilton Sampaio

==== Finals ====
Goals, assists and red cards are shown.

12 October 2022 1st leg	Corinthians	0–0	Flamengo	São Paulo
21:45 UTC−3		Report		Stadium: Neo Química Arena; Attendance: 47,031; Referee: Bráulio da Silva Machado

19 October 2022 2nd leg	Flamengo	1–1 (1–1 agg.) (6–5 p)	Corinthians	Rio de Janeiro
21:45 UTC−3	Pedro 7' (Ribeiro)	Report	Giuliano 82'	Stadium: Maracanã; Attendance: 68,097; Referee: Wilton Sampaio
	Penalties
	Filipe Luís (penalty missed); David Luiz (penalty scored); L. Pereira (penalty scored); Ribeiro (penalty scored); Gabriel (penalty scored); Everton (penalty scored); Rodinei (penalty scored)		(penalty scored) Santos; (penalty scored) Giuliano; (penalty scored) Augusto; (penalty missed) Fagner; (penalty scored) Yuri Alberto; (penalty scored) Maycon; (penalty missed) Vital

== Management team ==
As of 27 June 2022.

Position	Name
Coaching staff
Head coach	(Brazil) Dorival Júnior
Assistant head coach	(Brazil) Lucas Silvestre
Assistant head coach	(Brazil) Pedro Sotero
Goalkeepers trainer	(Brazil) Thiago Eller
Performance analyst	(Brazil) Wellington Sales
Performance analyst	(Brazil) Eduardo Coimbra
Performance analyst	(Brazil) Daniel Motta
Performance analyst	(Brazil) Henrique Américo
Medical staff
Fitness coach	(Brazil) Celso Rezende
Fitness coach	(Brazil) Willian Costa
Health and high performance manager	(Brazil) Marcio Tannure
Doctor	(Brazil) Marcelo Soares
Doctor	(Brazil) Fernando Bassan
Physiotherapist	(Brazil) Mario Peixoto
Physiotherapist	(Brazil) Marcio Puglia
Physiotherapist	(Brazil) Laniyan Neves
Physiotherapist	(Brazil) Alam Santos
Physiotherapist	(Brazil) Fábio Feitosa

== Roster ==
As of 17 September 2022

No.	Pos.	Name	Date of birth (age)	Signed in	Contract end	Signed from	Transfer fee	Notes
Goalkeepers
1	GK	(Brazil) Diego Alves	24 June 1985 (aged 37)	2017	2022	(Spain) Valencia	€300k	
20	GK	(Brazil) Santos	17 March 1990 (aged 32)	2022	2026	(Brazil) Athletico Paranaense	€3m	
25	GK	(Brazil) Matheus Cunha	24 May 2001 (aged 21)	2022	2023	Youth system		
45	GK	(Brazil) Hugo Souza	31 January 1999 (aged 23)	2018	2025	Youth system		
Defenders
2	RB	(Uruguay) Guillermo Varela	24 March 1993 (aged 29)	2022	2023	(Russia) Dynamo Moscow		On loan from Dynano Moscow
3	CB	(Brazil) Rodrigo Caio	17 August 1993 (aged 29)	2019	2023	(Brazil) São Paulo	€5m	
4	CB	(Brazil) Léo Pereira	31 January 1996 (aged 26)	2020	2024	(Brazil) Athletico Paranaense	€6.1m	
6	LB	(Brazil) Ayrton Lucas	19 June 1997 (aged 25)	2022	2022	(Russia) Spartak Moscow	€717k	On loan from Spartak Moscow
15	CB	(Brazil) Fabrício Bruno	12 February 1996 (aged 26)	2022	2025	(Brazil) Red Bull Bragantino	€2.5m	
16	LB	(Brazil) Filipe Luís	9 August 1985 (aged 37)	2019	2022	(Spain) Atlético Madrid	Free	
22	RB	(Brazil) Rodinei	29 January 1992 (aged 30)	2016	2022	(Brazil) SEV Hortolândia	€941k	
23	CB	(Brazil) David Luiz	22 April 1987 (aged 35)	2021	2023	(England) Arsenal	Free	
30	CB	(Brazil) Pablo	21 June 1991 (aged 31)	2022	2025	(Russia) Lokomotiv Moscow	€2.5m	
34	RB	(Brazil) Matheuzinho	8 September 2000 (aged 22)	2020	2026	(Brazil) Londrina	€180k	
Midfielders
5	DM	(Chile) Erick Pulgar	15 January 1994 (aged 28)	2022	2025	(Italy) Fiorentina	€3m	
7	AM	(Brazil) Éverton Ribeiro	10 April 1989 (aged 33)	2017	2023	(United Arab Emirates) Al-Ahli	€6m	Captain
8	DM	(Brazil) Thiago Maia	23 March 1997 (aged 25)	2020	2026	(France) Lille	€4m	
10	CM	(Brazil) Diego	28 February 1985 (aged 37)	2016	2022	(Turkey) Fenerbahçe	Free	Vice Captain
14	AM	(Uruguay) Giorgian de Arrascaeta	1 June 1994 (aged 28)	2019	2026	(Brazil) Cruzeiro	€15m	
29	CM	(Brazil) Victor Hugo	11 May 2004 (aged 18)	2022	2027	Youth system		
32	CM	(Chile) Arturo Vidal	22 May 1987 (aged 35)	2022	2023	(Italy) Inter Milan	Free	
35	DM	(Brazil) João Gomes	12 February 2001 (aged 21)	2020	2027	Youth system		
42	AM	(Brazil) Matheus França	1 April 2004 (aged 18)	2021	2027	Youth system		
Forwards
9	CF	(Brazil) Gabriel Barbosa	30 August 1996 (aged 26)	2019	2024	(Italy) Inter Milan	€17m	2nd Vice Captain
11	LW	(Brazil) Everton	22 March 1996 (aged 26)	2022	2026	(Portugal) Benfica	€13.5m	
21	CF	(Brazil) Pedro	20 June 1997 (aged 25)	2021	2025	(Italy) Fiorentina	€14m	
27	LW	(Brazil) Bruno Henrique	30 December 1990 (aged 32)	2019	2023	(Brazil) Santos	€5.4m	
31	RW	(Brazil) Marinho	29 May 1990 (aged 32)	2022	2023	(Brazil) Santos	€1.2m	

=== New contracts ===
No.	Pos.	Player	Date	Until	Source
1	GK	(Brazil) Diego Alves	1 January 2022	31 December 2022	
16	DF	(Brazil) Filipe Luís	1 January 2022	31 December 2022	
10	MF	(Brazil) Diego	1 January 2022	31 December 2022	
14	MF	(Uruguay) Giorgian de Arrascaeta	18 January 2022	31 December 2026	
42	MF	(Brazil) Matheus França	25 January 2022	30 April 2027	
17	FW	(Brazil) André Luiz	26 March 2022	31 December 2024	
48	MF	(Brazil) Igor Jesus	25 February 2022	31 December 2023	
34	DF	(Brazil) Matheuzinho	2 June 2022	31 December 2026	
29	MF	(Brazil) Victor Hugo	14 July 2022	31 July 2027	
35	MF	(Brazil) João Gomes	17 September 2022	31 August 2027	

== Transfers and loans ==
=== Transfers in ===
Pos.	Player	Transferred from	Fee	Date	Team	Source
MF	(Brazil) Hugo Moura	(Switzerland) Lugano	Loan return	1 January 2022	First Team	
MF	(Brazil) Max	(Brazil) Cuiabá	Loan return	1 January 2022	First Team	
HC	(Portugal) Paulo Sousa	Poland	Free	1 January 2022	First Team	
DF	(Paraguay) Santiago Ocampos	(Israel) Beitar Jerusalem	Free	4 January 2022	Academy	
MF	(Brazil) Thiago Maia	(France) Lille OSC	R$25.5m / €4m	12 January 2022	First Team	
FW	(Brazil) Marinho	(Brazil) Santos	R$7m / €1.2m	27 January 2022	First Team	
DF	(Brazil) Fabrício Bruno	(Brazil) Red Bull Bragantino	R$15m / €2.5m	7 February 2022	First Team	
MF	(Brazil) André	(Brazil) Grêmio Novorizontino	Free	14 February 2022	Academy	
DF	(Brazil) Pablo	(Russia) Lokomotiv Moscow	R$14m / €2.5m	14 March 2022	First Team	
GK	(Brazil) Santos	(Brazil) Athletico Paranaense	R$15.5m / €3m	1 April 2022	First Team	
MF	(Colombia) César Cantillo	(Colombia) Millionarios	Free	22 May 2022	Academy	
HC	(Brazil) Dorival Júnior	(Brazil) Ceará	Free	10 June 2022	First Team	
MF	(Brazil) Everton	(Portugal) Benfica	R$73m / €13.5m	20 June 2022	First team	
FW	(Brazil) Weverton	(Portugal) Académica	Loan return	1 July 2022	First team	
MF	(Colombia) Richard Ríos	(Mexico) Mazatlán F.C.	Loan return	1 July 2022	First team	
DF	(Brazil) Matheus Thuler	(France) Montpellier	Loan return	1 July 2022	First team	
DF	(Brazil) Rafael Santos	(Cyprus) APOEL FC	Loan return	1 July 2022	First team	
MF	(Chile) Arturo Vidal	(Italy) Inter Milan	Free	14 July 2022	First team	
DF	(Brazil) Gabriel Noga	(Brazil) Atlético Goianiense	Loan return	22 July 2022	First team	
MF	(Chile) Erick Pulgar	(Italy) Fiorentina	R$15.9m / €3m	29 July 2022	First team	
MF	(Brazil) Keder	(Brazil) Cuiabá	Undisclosed	9 August 2022	Academy	
FW	(Ecuador) Ariel Suárez	(Ecuador) Orense	Undisclosed	14 August 2022	Academy	
Total			R$161.8m / €29.7m			

=== Loan in ===
Pos.	Player	Loaned from	Fee	Start	End	Team	Source
DF	(Brazil) Ayrton Lucas	(Russia) Spartak Moscow	R$3.8m / €717k	29 March 2022	31 December 2022	First Team	
DF	(Uruguay) Guillermo Varela	(Russia) Dynamo Moscow	Free	30 July 2022	30 June 2023	First Team	
Total			R$3.8m / €717k				

=== Transfers out ===
Pos.	Player	Transferred to	Fee	Date	Team	Source
DF	(Brazil) Bruno Viana	(Portugal) Braga	Loan return	1 January 2022	First Team	
DF	(Brazil) Vinicius Milani	(Brazil) Real Brasília	Loan return	1 January 2022	Academy	
MF	(Brazil) Gabriel Barros	(Brazil) Ituano	Loan return	1 January 2022	Academy	
DF	(Brazil) Luan Sales	(Brazil) Atlético Goianiense	Loan return	1 January 2022	Academy	
MF	(Paraguay) Fabrizio Peralta	(Paraguay) Cerro Porteño	Loan return	1 January 2022	Academy	
GK	(Brazil) Yago Darub	Free agent	End of contract	1 January 2022	First Team	
FW	(Brazil) Rhyan	Free agent	End of contract	1 January 2022	Academy	
DF	(Brazil) Ítalo	(United States) New England Revolution	Free	1 January 2022	Academy	
MF	(Brazil) Max	(United States) Colorado Rapids	R$5.6m / €887k	1 January 2022	First Team	
FW	(Brazil) Bill	(Ukraine) Dnipro-1	R$2.5m / €400k	1 January 2022	First Team	
DF	(Brazil) João Lucas	(Brazil) Cuiabá	R$2.0m / €360k	1 January 2022	First Team	
MF	(Paraguay) Robert Piris Da Motta	(Paraguay) Cerro Porteño	R$5.6m / €887k	11 January 2022	First Team	
FW	(Brazil) Kenedy	(England) Chelsea	Loan return	12 January 2022	First Team	
GK	(Brazil) César	Free agent	Free	13 January 2022	First Team	
DF	(Brazil) Natan	(Brazil) Red Bull Bragantino	R$22m / €3.4m	22 January 2022	First Team	
FW	(Colombia) Camilo Durán	(Colombia) Independiente Medellín	Loan return	25 January 2022	Academy	
FW	(Brazil) Michael	(Saudi Arabia) Al Hilal	R$45.5m / €7.6m	27 January 2022	First Team	
DF	(Brazil) Kayque Campos	(United Arab Emirates) Shabab Al Ahli	R$3.0m / €500k	1 February 2022	Academy	
DF	(Brazil) Renê	(Brazil) Internacional	Unidisclosed	10 April 2022	First team	
HC	(Portugal) Paulo Sousa	Free agent	R$6.0m / €1.0m	9 June 2022	First team	
DF	(Chile) Mauricio Isla	(Chile) Universidad Católica	Free	21 June 2022	First Team	
MF	(Brazil) Andreas Pereira	(England) Manchester United	Loan return	1 July 2022	First Team	
FW	(Brazil) Weverton	(Portugal) Mafra	Free	1 July 2022	First Team	
MF	(Brazil) Willian Arão	(Turkey) Fenerbahçe	R$16.0m / €3.0m	12 July 2022	First Team	
MF	(Brazil) Hugo Moura	(Brazil) Athletico Paranaense	R$6.6m / €1.2m	19 July 2022	First Team	
DF	(Brazil) Rafael Santos	(Portugal) Moreirense	Free	19 July 2022	First Team	
GK	(Brazil) Bruno Guimarães	(Brazil) Fortaleza	Free	1 August 2022	Academy	
MF	(Colombia) Richard Ríos	(Brazil) Guarani	Undisclosed	2 August 2022	First Team	
GK	(Brazil) Gabriel Batista	(Portugal) Santa Clara	Free	17 August 2022	First Team	
FW	(Brazil) Vitinho	(Saudi Arabia) Al-Etiffaq	Free	29 August 2022	First Team	
FW	(Brazil) Lázaro	(Spain) Almería	R$36.4m / €7m	1 September 2022	First Team	
Total			R$158.7m / €26.8m			

=== Loan out ===
Pos.	Player	Loaned to	Fee	Start	End	Team	Source
FW	(Brazil) Weverton	(Portugal) Académica	Free	1 January 2022	30 June 2023	Academy	
FW	(Brazil) Vitor Gabriel	(Brazil) Juventude	Free	5 January 2022	31 December 2022	First Team	
MF	(Brazil) Hugo Moura	(Brazil) Athletico Paranaense	Free	5 January 2022	31 December 2022	First Team	
GK	(Brazil) Gabriel Batista	(Brazil) Sampaio Corrêa	Free	22 January 2022	15 November 2022	First Team	
MF	(Brazil) Pedrinho	(Brazil) Azuriz	Free	28 January 2022	31 December 2022	Academy	
DF	(Brazil) Patrick	(Brazil) Tombense	Free	1 February 2022	5 November 2022	First Team	
DF	(Brazil) Otávio	(Brazil) Sampaio Corrêa	Free	13 February 2022	15 November 2022	First Team	
FW	(Brazil) Thiago Fernandes	(United States) Houston Dynamo FC	Free	21 March 2022	31 December 2022	First Team	
DF	(Brazil) Gabriel Noga	(Brazil) Atlético Goianiense	Free	29 March 2022	31 December 2022	First Team	
DF	(Brazil) Ramon	(Brazil) Red Bull Bragantino	Free	8 April 2022	31 December 2022	First Team	
DF	(Brazil) Gabriel Noga	(Brazil) Bahia	Free	27 July 2022	31 December 2022	First Team	
DF	(Brazil) Gustavo Henrique	(Turkey) Fenerbahçe	R$7.5m / €1.4m	29 July 2022	30 June 2023	First Team	
DF	(Brazil) Matheus Thuler	(Japan) Vissel Kobe	Free	1 August 2022	31 December 2022	First Team	
Total			R$7.5m / €1.4m				

== Statistics ==
=== Appearances ===
Players in italics have left the club before the end of the season.
^{†} Denotes two way player, youth and professional team.

No.	Pos.	Name	Série A		Copa do Brasil		Libertadores		Carioca		Other (Note: Includes Supercopa do Brasil.)		Total		
No.	Pos.	Name	Starts	Subs	Starts	Subs	Starts	Subs	Starts	Subs	Starts	Subs	Starts	Subs	Apps
Goalkeepers
1	GK	(Brazil) Diego Alves	5	0	1	0	0	0	2	0	0	0	8	0	8
20	GK	(Brazil) Santos	19	0	8	0	10	0	—	—	—	—	37	0	37
25	GK	(Brazil) Matheus Cunha	0	0	0	0	0	0	2	0	—	—	2	0	2
45	GK	(Brazil) Hugo Souza	14	1	1	0	3	0	11	0	1	0	30	1	31
	GK	(Brazil) João Fernando^{†}	—	—	—	—	—	—	0	0	—	—	0	0	0
Defenders
2	RB	(Uruguay) Guillermo Varela	3	2	—	—	0	1	—	—	—	—	3	3	6
3	CB	(Brazil) Rodrigo Caio	7	1	2	0	1	1	—	—	—	—	10	2	12
4	CB	(Brazil) Léo Pereira	11	2	9	0	6	2	6	2	0	1	32	7	39
6	LB	(Brazil) Ayrton Lucas	28	3	1	3	2	4	—	—	—	—	31	10	41
15	CB	(Brazil) Fabrício Bruno	13	0	1	4	1	0	8	0	1	0	24	4	28
16	LB	(Brazil) Filipe Luís	8	2	8	0	10	0	8	2	1	0	35	4	39
22	RB	(Brazil) Rodinei	9	6	9	1	7	4	5	3	1	0	31	14	45
23	CB	(Brazil) David Luiz	17	2	7	0	9	0	7	3	1	0	41	5	46
30	CB	(Brazil) Pablo	21	1	1	2	5	0	—	—	—	—	27	3	30
33	CB	(Brazil) Cleiton^{†}	0	1	0	0	0	0	4	1	—	—	4	2	6
34	RB	(Brazil) Matheuzinho	22	5	1	2	3	2	7	3	0	1	33	13	46
43	RB	(Brazil) Wesley França^{†}	—	—	0	0	—	—	2	0	—	—	2	0	2
47	LB	(Brazil) Marcos Paulo^{†}	0	1	1	1	0	0	2	0	—	—	3	2	5
51	CB	(Brazil) Iago Teodoro^{†}	—	—	0	0	—	—	–	–	—	—	0	0	0
54	CB	(Brazil) Diego Santos^{†}	—	—	—	—	—	—	0	0	—	—	0	0	0
56	LB	(Brazil) Richard dos Santos^{†}	—	—	—	—	—	—	0	1	—	—	0	1	1
Midfielders
5	DM	(Chile) Erick Pulgar	4	2	—	—	0	2	—	—	—	—	4	4	8
7	AM	(Brazil) Éverton Ribeiro	19	11	8	0	12	0	7	5	1	0	47	16	63
8	DM	(Brazil) Thiago Maia	18	6	7	1	10	0	3	0	—	—	39	6	45
10	AM	(Brazil) Diego	11	8	2	3	1	5	2	3	0	1	16	20	36
14	AM	(Uruguay) Giorgian de Arrascaeta	16	8	8	1	11	0	9	2	1	0	45	11	56
28	CM	(Brazil) Daniel Cabral^{†}	0	1	1	0	—	—	—	—	—	—	1	1	2
29	CM	(Brazil) Victor Hugo	17	4	0	8	0	8	0	0	—	—	17	20	37
32	CM	(Chile) Arturo Vidal	8	6	2	4	1	4	—	—	—	—	11	14	25
35	DM	(Brazil) João Gomes	22	7	8	1	10	2	8	5	1	0	49	15	64
38	AM	(Brazil) Yuri de Oliveira^{†}	—	—	—	—	—	—	2	0	—	—	2	0	2
39	CM	(Brazil) Kayke David^{†}	0	2	—	—	0	0	0	2	—	—	0	4	4
42	AM	(Brazil) Matheus França	7	10	0	1	0	2	2	1	—	—	9	14	23
48	DM	(Brazil) Igor Jesus^{†}	0	3	1	0	—	—	2	0	—	—	3	3	6
Forwards
9	CF	(Brazil) Gabriel Barbosa	23	6	9	0	12	0	11	1	1	0	56	7	63
11	LW	(Brazil) Everton	15	5	0	6	1	4	–	–	—	—	16	15	31
17	FW	(Brazil) André Luiz^{†}	0	1	—	—	—	—	2	0	—	—	2	1	3
19	LW	(Brazil) Werton^{†}	0	2	—	—	—	—	0	1	—	—	0	3	3
21	CF	(Brazil) Pedro	12	12	9	2	7	6	6	6	0	0	34	26	60
27	LW	(Brazil) Bruno Henrique	8	0	1	0	5	1	4	3	1	0	19	4	23
31	RW	(Brazil) Marinho	16	9	2	1	1	4	4	7	0	0	24	20	44
37	FW	(Brazil) Petterson^{†}	0	2	0	1	0	0	0	1	—	—	0	4	4
40	CF	(Brazil) Matheus Gonçalves^{†}	0	3	—	—	—	—	0	0	—	—	0	3	3
46	CF	(Brazil) Mateusão^{†}	1	6	0	0	0	0	0	1	—	—	1	7	8
48	CF	(Brazil) Ryan Luka^{†}	—	—	—	—	—	—	0	1	—	—	0	1	1
50	CF	(Brazil) Pedrinho^{†}	0	1	—	—	—	—	—	—	—	—	0	1	1
Player(s) transferred out during the season
2	CB	(Brazil) Gustavo Henrique	3	2	0	0	1	0	4	0	—	—	8	2	10
5	CM	(Brazil) Willian Arão	10	4	1	0	5	1	7	5	1	0	24	10	34
6	LB	(Brazil) Renê	0	0	—	—	0	0	2	1	0	0	2	1	3
11	LW	(Brazil) Vitinho	4	7	0	0	0	0	3	6	0	1	7	14	21
13	CF	(Brazil) Lázaro	10	11	1	4	1	6	7	4	0	1	19	26	45
18	CM	(Brazil) Andreas Pereira	9	4	1	0	3	4	8	0	0	0	21	8	29
32	RW	(Brazil) Thiago Fernandes	—	—	—	—	—	—	2	0	—	—	2	0	2
36	LB	(Brazil) Ramon	—	—	—	—	—	—	—	—	—	—	0	0	0
41	CB	(Brazil) Gabriel Noga	—	—	—	—	—	—	4	0	0	0	4	0	4
44	RB	(Chile) Mauricio Isla	4	2	—	—	3	0	2	2	0	0	9	4	13
52	GK	(Brazil) Bruno Guimarães^{†}	—	—	0	0	—	—	—	—	—	—	0	0	0

=== Goalscorers ===
Rank	Pos.	No.	Player	Série A	Copa do Brasil	Libertadores	Carioca	Other (Note: Includes Supercopa do Brasil.)	Total
1	FW	21	(Brazil) Pedro	11	3	12	3	0	29
1	FW	9	(Brazil) Gabriel Barbosa	11	2	6	9	1	29
3	MF	14	(Uruguay) Giorgian de Arrascaeta	3	3	2	5	0	13
4	FW	13	(Brazil) Lázaro	4	1	1	2	0	8
5	MF	7	(Brazil) Éverton Ribeiro	2	0	4	1	0	7
6	FW	31	(Brazil) Marinho	4	0	1	1	0	6
6	MF	42	(Brazil) Matheus França	4	0	1	1	0	6
8	MF	5	(Brazil) Willian Arão	2	0	1	2	0	5
9	MF	18	(Brazil) Andreas Pereira	2	0	1	0	0	3
9	FW	27	(Brazil) Bruno Henrique	1	0	1	0	1	3
9	MF	29	(Brazil) Victor Hugo	2	1	0	0	0	3
9	FW	11	(Brazil) Everton	2	1	0	0	0	3
13	DF	2	(Brazil) Gustavo Henrique	1	0	0	1	0	2
13	DF	6	(Brazil) Ayrton Lucas	2	0	0	0	0	2
13	MF	10	(Brazil) Diego	1	0	0	1	0	2
13	DF	15	(Brazil) Fabrício Bruno	2	0	0	0	0	2
13	MF	32	(Chile) Arturo Vidal	2	0	0	0	0	2
13	MF	35	(Brazil) João Gomes	0	2	0	0	0	2
13	DF	44	(Chile) Mauricio Isla	1	0	1	0	0	2
13	DF	34	(Brazil) Matheuzinho	1	0	1	0	0	2
21	DF	4	(Brazil) Léo Pereira	0	0	0	1	0	1
21	DF	16	(Brazil) Filipe Luís	0	0	0	1	0	1
21	FW	19	(Brazil) Werton	1	0	0	0	0	1
Own Goals				1	0	1	1	0	3
Total				60	13	33	30	2	138

=== Assists ===
Rank	Pos.	No.	Player	Série A	Copa do Brasil	Libertadores	Carioca	Other (Note: Includes Supercopa do Brasil.)	Total
1	MF	14	(Uruguay) Giorgian de Arrascaeta	10	1	3	5	0	19
2	MF	7	(Brazil) Éverton Ribeiro	4	3	2	1	0	10
3	FW	27	(Brazil) Bruno Henrique	2	1	5	0	0	8
4	FW	13	(Brazil) Lázaro	2	0	2	2	1	7
4	FW	21	(Brazil) Pedro	3	2	2	0	0	7
6	DF	2	(Brazil) Rodinei	1	3	2	0	0	6
6	FW	31	(Brazil) Marinho	5	0	1	0	0	6
6	DF	6	(Brazil) Ayrton Lucas	6	0	0	0	0	6
9	FW	9	(Brazil) Gabriel Barbosa	1	0	3	1	0	5
9	DF	34	(Brazil) Matheuzinho	3	0	1	1	0	5
9	FW	11	(Brazil) Everton	5	0	0	0	0	5
12	FW	11	(Brazil) Vitinho	0	0	0	4	0	4
13	DF	44	(Chile) Mauricio Isla	1	0	1	1	0	3
13	MF	29	(Brazil) Victor Hugo	2	1	0	0	0	3
15	MF	5	(Brazil) Willian Arão	0	0	0	2	0	2
15	MF	18	(Brazil) Andreas Pereira	1	0	1	0	0	2
15	MF	35	(Brazil) João Gomes	1	0	1	0	0	2
18	DF	4	(Brazil) Léo Pereira	0	0	1	0	0	1
18	DF	6	(Brazil) Renê	0	0	0	1	0	1
18	MF	8	(Brazil) Thiago Maia	0	0	1	0	0	1
18	DF	23	(Brazil) David Luiz	0	0	1	0	0	1
18	MF	32	(Chile) Arturo Vidal	1	0	0	0	0	1
18	DF	15	(Brazil) Fabrício Bruno	1	0	0	0	0	1
Total				47	11	27	18	1	113

=== Clean sheets ===
Rank	No.	Player	Série A	Copa do Brasil	Libertadores	Carioca	Other (Note: Includes Supercopa do Brasil.)	Total
1	20	(Brazil) Santos	8 / 19	5 / 8	5 / 10	–	—	18 / 37
2	45	(Brazil) Hugo Souza	2 / 14	1 / 1	2 / 3	5 / 11	0 / 1	10 / 30
3	25	(Brazil) Matheus Cunha	—	—	—	1 / 2	—	1 / 2
3	1	(Brazil) Diego Alves	1 / 5	0 / 1	—	0 / 2	—	1 / 8
Total			11 / 38	6 / 10	7 / 13	6 / 15	0 / 1	30 / 77

=== Season records ===
==== Individual ====
- Most matches played in the season in all competitions: 64 – João Gomes
- Most League matches played in the season: 31 – Ayrton Lucas
- Most matches played as starter in the season in all competitions: 56 – Gabriel Barbosa
- Most League matches played as starter in the season: 27 – Ayrton Lucas
- Most matches played as substitute in the season in all competitions: 26 – Lázaro, Pedro
- Most League matches played as substitute in the season: 12 – Pedro
- Most goals in the season in all competitions: 29 – Pedro, Gabriel Barbosa
- Most League goals in the season: 11 – Gabriel Barbosa, Pedro
- Most clean sheets in the season in all competitions: 18 – Santos
- Most League clean sheets in the season: 8 – Santos
- Most goals scored in a match: 4
  - Pedro vs Deportes Tolima, Copa Libertadores, 6 July 2022
- Goals in consecutive matches in all competitions: 3 consecutive match(es)
  - Pedro, 17 May 2022 to 24 May 2022
  - Gabriel Barbosa, 18 September 2022 to 1 October 2022
- Goals in consecutive League matches: 3 consecutive match(es)
  - Lázaro, 30 July 2022 to 14 August 2022
  - Gabriel Barbosa, 18 September 2022 to 1 October 2022
- Fastest goal: 54 seconds
  - Matheuzinho vs Juventude, Série A, 9 November 2022
- Hat-tricks:
  - Pedro (4 goals) vs Deportes Tolima, Copa Libertadores, 6 July 2022
  - Pedro vs Velez Sarsfield, Copa Libertadores, 31 August 2022
  - Pedro vs Red Bull Bragantino, Série A, 1 October 2022

==== Team ====
- Biggest home win in all competitions:
  - 7–1 vs Deportes Tolima, Copa Libertadores, 6 July 2022
- Biggest League home win:
  - 5–0 vs Athletico Paranaense, Série A, 14 August 2022
- Biggest away win in all competitions:
  - 6–0 vs Bangu, Campeonato Carioca, 12 March 2022
- Biggest League away win:
  - 2–0 vs São Paulo, Série A, 6 August 2022
- Biggest home loss in all competitions:
  - 0–1 vs Fluminense, Campeonato Carioca, 6 February 2022
  - 0–1 vs Fluminense, Campeonato Carioca, 30 March 2022
  - 0–1 vs Botafogo, Série A, 8 May 2022
  - 1–2 vs Fortaleza, Série A, 5 June 2022
  - 1–2 vs Fluminense, Série A, 18 September 2022
  - 1–2 vs Corinthians, Série A, 2 November 2022
  - 1–2 vs Avaí, Série A, 12 November 2022
- Biggest League home loss:
  - 0–1 vs Botafogo, Série A, 8 May 2022
  - 1–2 vs Fortaleza, Série A, 5 June 2022
  - 1–2 vs Fluminense, Série A, 18 September 2022
  - 1–2 vs Corinthians, Série A, 2 November 2022
  - 1–2 vs Avaí, Série A, 12 November 2022
- Biggest away loss in all competitions:
  - 1–3 vs Internacional, Série A, 11 June 2022
  - 0–2 vs Atlético Mineiro, Série A, 19 June 2022
- Biggest League away loss:
  - 1–3 vs Internacional, Série A, 11 June 2022
  - 0–2 vs Atlético Mineiro, Série A, 19 June 2022
- Highest scoring match in all competitions:
  - 7–1 vs Deportes Tolima, Copa Libertadores, 6 July 2022
- Highest scoring League match:
  - 4–1 vs Atlético Goianiense, Série A, 30 July 2022
  - 5–0 vs Athletico Paranaense, Série A, 14 August 2022
  - 4–1 vs Red Bull Bragantino, Série A, 1 October 2022
  - 3–2 vs Santos, Série A, 25 October 2022
- Longest winning run in all competitions: 5 consecutive match(es)
  - 30 July 2022 to 17 August 2022
- Longest League winning run: 6 consecutive match(es)
  - 16 July 2022 to 14 August 2022
- Longest unbeaten run in all competitions: 19 consecutive match(es)
  - 13 July 2022 to 14 September 2022
- Longest League unbeaten run: 10 consecutive match(es)
  - 16 July 2022 to 11 September 2022
- Longest losing run in all competitions: 3 consecutive match(es)
  - 5 June 2022 to 11 June 2022
- Longest League losing run: 3 consecutive match(es)
  - 5 June 2022 to 11 June 2022
- Longest without win run in all competitions: 4 consecutive match(es)
  - 30 July 2022 to 9 August 2022; 2 November 2022 to 12 November 2022
- Longest without League win run: 4 consecutive match(es)
  - 20 April 2022 to 14 May 2022; 4 September 2022 to 28 September 2022; 2 November 2022 to 12 November 2022
- Longest scoring run in all competitions: 16 consecutive match(es)
  - 30 July 2022 to 1 October 2022
- Longest League scoring run: 13 consecutive match(es)
  - 16 July 2022 to 1 October 2022
- Longest without scoring run in all competitions: 2 consecutive match(es)
  - 20 April 2022 to 23 April 2022
- Longest League without scoring run: 3 consecutive match(es)
  - 20 April 2022 to 8 May 2022
- Longest conceding goals run in all competitions: 6 consecutive match(es)
  - 28 April 2022 to 14 May 2022; 2 November 2022 to 12 November 2022
- Longest League conceding goals run: 6 consecutive match(es)
  - 2 November 2022 to 12 November 2022
- Longest without conceding goals run in all competitions: 5 consecutive match(es)
  - 2 August 2022 to 17 August 2022
- Longest League without conceding goals run: 2 consecutive match(es)
  - 16 July 2022 to 20 July 2022; 6 August 2022 to 14 August 2022

=== National Team statistics ===
As of 9 December 2022

Appearances and goals while playing for Flamengo.

No.	Pos.	Name	Nat. Team	Friendlies		FIFA WCQ		FIFA WC		Total	
No.	Pos.	Name	Nat. Team	Apps	Goals	Apps	Goals	Apps	Goals	Apps	Goals
2	RB	Guillermo Varela	Uruguay	2	0	–	–	3	0	5	0
5	DM	Erick Pulgar	Chile	1	0	–	–	–	–	1	0
7	AM	Éverton Ribeiro	Brazil	2	0	1	0	1	0	4	0
9	CF	Gabriel Barbosa	Brazil	–	–	1	0	–	–	1	0
14	AM	Giorgian de Arrascaeta	Uruguay	3	0	3	2	2	2	8	4
21	CF	Pedro	Brazil	1	1	–	–	2	0	3	1
32	CM	Arturo Vidal	Chile	3	1	–	–	–	–	3	1
44	RB	Mauricio Isla	Chile	–	–	4	0	–	–	4	0

=== Attendance ===
Includes all competition home matches in the 2022 season. Attendances recorded represent actual gate attendance, not paid attendance.

Campeonato Carioca
Stadium	Matches	Average	Highest attendance	Lowest attendance
Luso Brasileiro	1	3,116	3,116	3,116
Raulino de Oliveira	1^{a}	9,124	9,124	9,124
Estádio Nilton Santos	3	16,599	20,485	9,127
Maracanã	2	55,650	58,478	52,821
Total	7	24,762	173,337	
Copa do Brasil
Stadium	Matches	Average	Highest attendance	Lowest attendance
Raulino de Oliveira	1	13,077	13,077	13,077
Maracanã	4	66,273	68,747	62,977
Total	5	55,634	278,169	
Libertadores
Stadium	Matches	Average	Highest attendance	Lowest attendance
Maracanã	6	58,801	68,418	38,100
Total	6	58,801	321,471	
Série A
Stadium	Matches	Average	Highest attendance	Lowest attendance
Maracanã	16	56,468	69,997	42,931
Arena BRB Mané Garrincha	3	51,384	65,392	33,778
Total	19	54,599	1,037,387	
Season total	37	48,929	1,810,364	

- ^{a} Flamengo x Nova Iguaçu match attendance is not available.

== Individual awards ==
Name	Position	Nat.	Award
Pedro	FW	(Brazil)	South American Footballer of the Year; Copa Libertadores Best of the tournament; Copa Libertadores Top Goal Scorer
Giorgian de Arrascaeta	MF	(Uruguay)	Bola de Prata; Campeonato Brasileiro Série A Team of the Year
João Gomes	MF	(Brazil)	Campeonato Brasileiro Série A Team of the Year
