= Marcos Felipe =

Brazilian footballer

Personal information
- Full name: Marcos Felipe de Freitas Monteiro
- Date of birth: 13 April 1996 (age 30)
- Place of birth: Linhares, Brazil
- Height: 1.88 m (6 ft 2 in)
- Position: Goalkeeper

Team information
- Current team: Çorum
- Number: 1

Youth career
- Fluminense

Senior career*
Years	Team	Apps	(Gls)
2013–2023	Fluminense	87	(0)
2015	→ Macaé (loan)	2	(0)
2023	→ Bahia (loan)	31	(0)
2023–2026	Bahia	65	(0)
2025–2026	→ Eyüpspor (loan)	19	(0)
2026–	Çorum	8	(0)

International career^{‡}
2013	Brazil U17	13	(0)
2015	Brazil U20	9	(0)
2014	Brazil U21	4	(0)
- * Club domestic league appearances and goals as of 16 October 2026 ‡ National team caps and goals as of 8 October 2021

Marcos Felipe de Freitas Monteiro (born 13 April 1996), known as Marcos Felipe, is a Brazilian professional footballer who plays as a goalkeeper for Turkish Süper Lig club Çorum.

== Club career ==
=== Fluminense ===
Marcos Felipe began his career at Fluminense, the goalkeeper signed on loan at Macaé in 2015.

For Fluminense, Marcos Felipe's most played season was 2021, when he took the field in 65 matches. In 2022, the goalkeeper made only nine appearances.

=== Bahia ===
Bahia announced on 28 December 2022, that it had closed the loan with an option to buy 26-year-old goalkeeper Marcos Felipe until the end of 2023.

Marcos Felipe was the highlight of a draw against São Paulo, in Morumbi, on 30 July 2023. He made 10 saves in the match to keep the score unchanged in the game valid for Brasileirão 2023, with 8 of the saves stopping shots from inside Bahia's box.

On 30 August 2023, the transfer was made permanent and Marcos Felipe signed a contract with Bahia until the end of 2027.

== Career statistics ==
As of match played 18 March 2025

Appearances and goals by club, season and competition
Club	Season	League			State League		Cup		Continental		Other		Total	
Club	Season	Division	Apps	Goals	Apps	Goals	Apps	Goals	Apps	Goals	Apps	Goals	Apps	Goals
Fluminense	2013	Série A	0	0	—		—		0	0	—		0	0
Fluminense	2014	Série A	—		—		—		0	0	—		0	0
Fluminense	2016	Série A	1	0	0	0	0	0	—		—		1	0
Fluminense	2017	Série A	0	0	1	0	1	0	0	0	0	0	2	0
Fluminense	2018	Série A	0	0	0	0	0	0	0	0	—		0	0
Fluminense	2019	Série A	6	0	0	0	—		0	0	—		6	0
Fluminense	2020	Série A	19	0	2	0	0	0	0	0	—		21	0
Fluminense	2021	Série A	36	0	13	0	6	0	10	0	—		65	0
Fluminense	2022	Série A	0	0	9	0	0	0	0	0	—		9	0
Fluminense	Total		62	0	25	0	7	0	10	0	0	0	104	0
Macaé (loan)	2015	Série B	2	0	—		—		—		—		2	0
Bahia	2023	Série A	37	0	11	0	8	0	—		7	0	63	0
Bahia	2024	Série A	34	0	3	0	8	0	—		9	0	54	0
Bahia	2025	Série A	0	0	4	0	0	0	4	0	1	0	9	0
Bahia	Total		71	0	18	0	16	0	4	0	17	0	126	0
Career total			135	0	43	0	23	0	16	0	17	0	232	0

== Honours ==
Fluminense

- Campeonato Carioca: 2022

Bahia

- Campeonato Baiano: 2023 e 2025
