= Matheus França =

Brazilian footballer (born 2004)

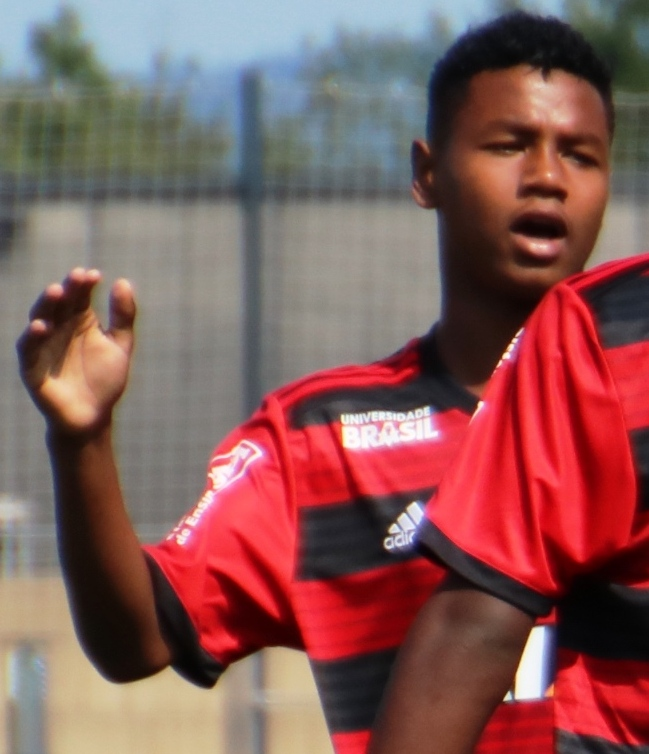
- Matheus França playing for Flamengo in 2018

Personal information
- Full name: Matheus França de Oliveira
- Date of birth: 1 April 2004 (age 22)
- Place of birth: Rio de Janeiro, Brazil
- Height: 1.78 m (5 ft 10 in)
- Positions: Attacking midfielder; forward

Team information
- Current team: Alverca (on loan from Crystal Palace)
- Number: 26

Youth career
- Olaria
- 2017–2022: Flamengo

Senior career*
Years	Team	Apps	(Gls)
2021–2023	Flamengo	42	(7)
2023–	Crystal Palace	14	(1)
2025–2026	→ Vasco da Gama (loan)	19	(0)
2026–	→ Alverca (loan)	0	(0)

International career^{‡}
2019	Brazil U16	6	(0)
2022	Brazil U20	3	(0)
- * Club domestic league appearances and goals as of 5 September 2026 ‡ National team caps and goals as of 18 January 2023

Matheus França de Oliveira (born 1 April 2004) is a Brazilian professional footballer who plays as an attacking midfielder or forward for Liga Portugal club Alverca on loan from Premier League club Crystal Palace.

== Club career ==
=== Early career ===
França was born in Rio de Janeiro, Brazil, and joined local club Flamengo at the age of 12, after being one of the stand-out performers playing for Olaria. He became part of the Flamengo youth team and was considered, alongside Lázaro, one of the club's greatest young players after Vinícius Júnior.

=== Flamengo ===
França debuted in the Flamengo's professional team on 6 December 2021 in a Campeonato Brasileiro Série A match against Santos at Maracanã Stadium, he replaced Éverton Ribeiro on the 78th minute. He had a €200 million release clause in his Flamengo contract.

On 25 January 2022, Flamengo extended França's contract until 30 April 2027. On 23 February 2023, França extended his contract with Flamengo until 31 December 2028.

=== Crystal Palace ===
On 1 August 2023, it was reported that Flamengo negotiated França's potential transfer to Premier League club Crystal Palace, for a reported fee around €20 million (about R$104 million), plus €5m in bonuses. On 5 August, França officially joined Crystal Palace on a five-year contract; he was given the number 11 which had previously been worn by Wilfried Zaha. On 21 October, he made his debut for the club in a 4–0 loss against Newcastle United.

França made his first start for the club on 4 January 2024 in a 0–0 draw with Everton in the third round of the FA Cup and was voted man of the match by Palace supporters following his performance. On 24 February, he registered his first assist for the club in a 3–0 win against Burnley, setting up a goal for Jordan Ayew. He also won a penalty in the same match which was subsequently scored by Jean-Philippe Mateta. On 2 April 2025, França scored his first goal for Palace, a 92-minute equalizer in a 1–1 away draw against Southampton.

==== 2025–26: Vasco da Gama (loan) ====
On 26 August 2025, Franca joined Brazilian club Vasco da Gama on loan until June 2026.

==== 2026–27: Alverca (loan) ====
On 4 September 2026, França moved on loan to Alverca in Portugal.

== International career ==
França has played internationally for Brazil at under-16 level with six appearances.

França has made three appearances for the Brazil U20 team. He was called-up to represent Brazil at the 2023 South American U-20 Championship, but Flamengo asked for his release to play in the FIFA Club World Cup.

== Career statistics ==
As of match played 8 April 2026

Appearances and goals by club, season and competition
Club	Season	League			State league (Note: Includes Campeonato Carioca)		National cup (Note: Includes Copa do Brasil, FA Cup)		League cup (Note: Includes EFL Cup)		Continental		Other		Total	
Club	Season	Division	Apps	Goals	Apps	Goals	Apps	Goals	Apps	Goals	Apps	Goals	Apps	Goals	Apps	Goals
Flamengo	2021	Série A	1	0	0	0	0	0	—		0	0	0	0	1	0
Flamengo	2022	Série A	17	4	3	1	1	0	—		2 (Note: Appearances in Copa Libertadores)	1	0	0	23	6
Flamengo	2023	Série A	9	1	12	1	2	0	—		3	1	2 (Note: One appearance in Supercopa do Brasil, one appearance in FIFA Club World Cup)	0	28	3
Flamengo	Total		27	5	15	2	3	0	—		5	2	2	0	52	9
Crystal Palace	2023–24	Premier League	10	0	—		2	0	0	0	—		—		12	0
Crystal Palace	2024–25	Premier League	4	1	—		3	0	0	0	—		—		7	1
Crystal Palace	2025–26	Premier League	0	0	—		—		—		0	0	0	0	0	0
Crystal Palace	Total		14	1	—		5	0	0	0	0	0	0	0	19	1
Vasco da Gama (loan)	2025	Série A	15	0	—		4	0	—		—		—		19	0
Vasco da Gama (loan)	2026	Série A	3	0	1	0	0	0	—		1 (Note: Appearance in Copa Sudamericana)	0	—		5	0
Vasco da Gama (loan)	Total		18	0	1	0	4	0	—		1	0	—		24	0
Career total			59	6	16	2	12	0	0	0	6	2	2	0	95	10

== Honours ==
Flamengo

- Copa Libertadores: 2022
- Copa do Brasil: 2022

Crystal Palace

- FA Cup: 2024–25
