= Gabriel Noga =

Brazilian footballer (born 2002)

Personal information
- Full name: Gabriel Rodrigues Noga
- Date of birth: 25 January 2002 (age 24)
- Place of birth: Volta Redonda, Brazil
- Height: 1.83 m (6 ft 0 in)
- Position: Centre-back

Team information
- Current team: Akademisk Boldklub
- Number: 14

Youth career
- 2017: Vasco da Gama
- 2017–2022: Flamengo

Senior career*
Years	Team	Apps	(Gls)
2020–2024	Flamengo	2	(0)
2022	→ Atlético Goianiense (loan)	1	(0)
2022	→ Bahia (loan)	0	(0)
2024	→ Leixões (loan)	1	(0)
2024–2025	Leixões	0	(0)
2024–2025	→ Oliveirense (loan)	15	(0)
2025–2026	Botev Plovdiv	6	(0)
2026–	Akademisk Boldklub	7	(0)

International career
2018	Brazil U16	1	(1)
2018–2019	Brazil U17	4	(0)
- * Club domestic league appearances and goals as of 13 October 2026

Gabriel Rodrigues Noga (born 25 January 2002) is a Brazilian professional footballer who plays as a centre-back for Danish 1st Division club Akademisk Boldklub.

== Career ==
=== Flamengo ===
==== Atlético Goianiense (loan) ====
On 29 March 2022 Noga was loaned to Atlético Goianiense until 31 December 2022. He only managed to have 3 total appearances and returned to Flamengo earlier than expected.

==== Bahia (loan) ====
On 27 July 2022 Flamengo loaned Noga to Bahia until 31 December 2022.

==== Leixões ====
On 30 January 2024, Flamengo sent Noga on loan to Liga Portugal 2 club Leixões until the end of the 2023–24 season.

In July 2024, Leixões confirmed that the club had bought Noga from Flamengo and given him a contract until June 2027. Noga managed to sit on the bench for just one game for Leixões in the 2024-25 season before being loaned out to fellow league side U.D. Oliveirense on September 2, 2024 for the rest of the season.

== Career statistics ==
As of 21 August 2024

Appearances and goals by club, season and competition
Club	Season	League			State league		Cup		Continental		Other		Total	
Club	Season	Division	Apps	Goals	Apps	Goals	Apps	Goals	Apps	Goals	Apps	Goals	Apps	Goals
Flamengo	2020	Série A	2	0	0	0	1	0	2 (Note: Appearance(s) in the Copa Libertadores.)	0	—		5	0
Flamengo	2021	Série A	0	0	3 (Note: Appearance(s) in the Campeonato Carioca.)	0	1	0	0	0	—		4	0
Flamengo	2022	Série A	—		4	0	—		—		—		4	0
Flamengo	2023	Série A	—		2	0	—		—		—		2	0
Flamengo	2024	Série A	—		1	0	—		—		—		1	0
Flamengo	Total		2	0	10	0	2	0	2	0	0	0	16	0
Atlético Goianiense (loan)	2022	Série A	1	0	—		1	0	1 (Note: Appearance(s) in the Copa Sudamericana.)	0	—		3	0
Bahia (loan)	2022	Série B	0	0	—		—		—		—		0	0
Leixões (loan)	2023–24	Liga Portugal 2	1	0	—		—		—		—		1	0
Leixões	2024–25	Liga Portugal 2	0	0	—		—		—		—		0	0
Career total			4	0	10	0	3	0	3	0	0	0	20	0

== Honours ==
=== Club ===
Flamengo

- Campeonato Brasileiro Série A: 2020
- Campeonato Carioca: 2021 e 2024

=== International ===
Brazil U17

- FIFA U-17 World Cup: 2019
