= Richard (footballer, born 2003) =

Brazilian footballer

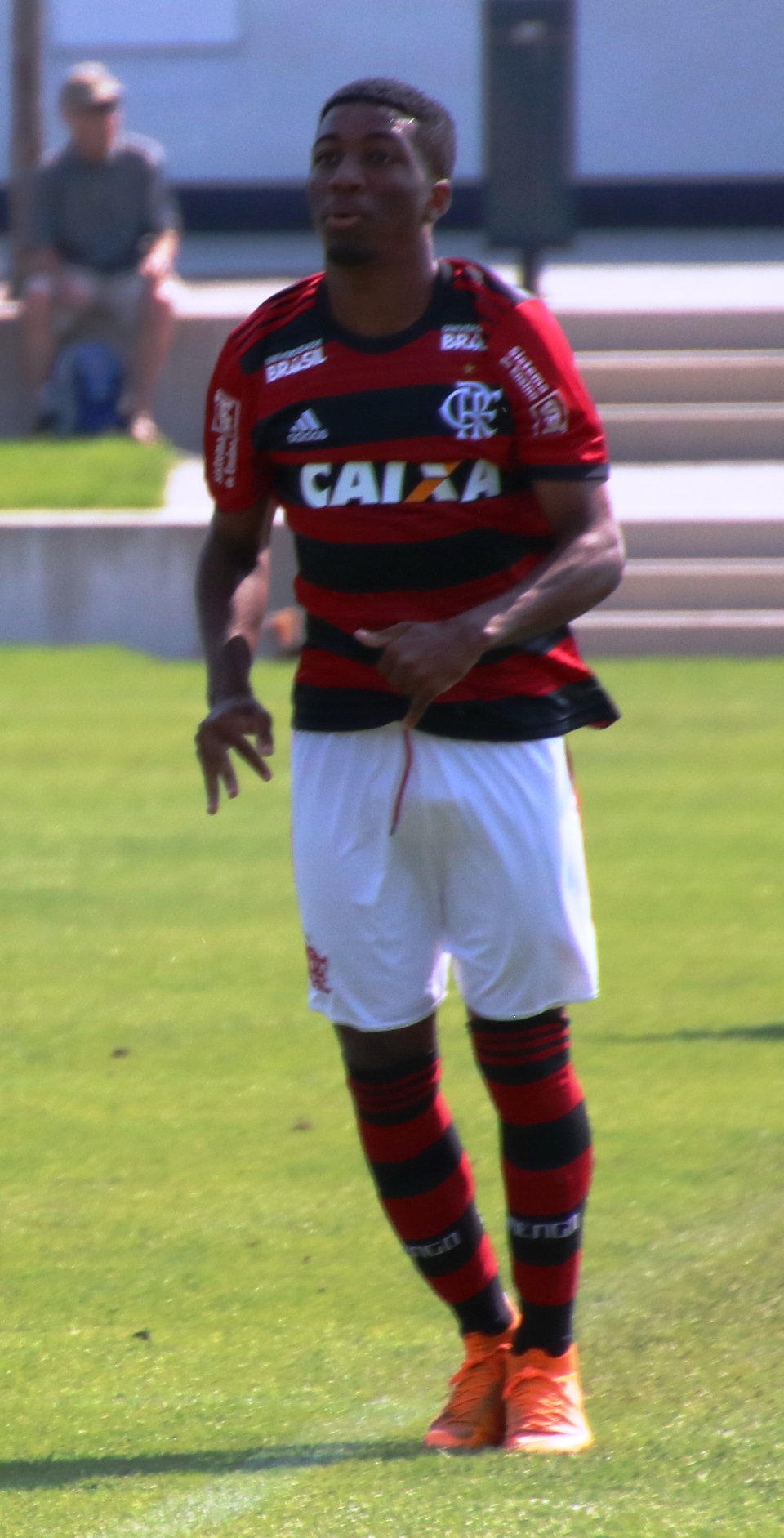
- Richard playing for Flamengo in 2018.

Personal information
- Full name: Richard dos Santos de Almeida
- Date of birth: 28 March 2003 (age 23)
- Place of birth: Rio de Janeiro, Brazil
- Height: 1.75 m (5 ft 9 in)
- Position: Left back

Youth career
- 2019–2022: Flamengo

Senior career*
Years	Team	Apps	(Gls)
2022–2023	Flamengo	1	(0)
2023	Čukarički	0	(0)
- * Club domestic league appearances and goals as of 28 May 2023

Richard dos Santos de Almeida (born 28 March 2003), commonly known as just Richard or Richard Almeida, is a Brazilian professional footballer who plays as a left back.

== Club career ==
Richard began his career with Flamengo and made his professional debut for the club on 26 January 2022 against Volta Redonda. He came on as an 81st-minute substitute for Marcos Paulo as Flamengo drew the match 0–0.

== Career statistics ==
As of 29 January 2022

Club	Season	League			State League		Cup		Continental		Other		Total	
Club	Season	Division	Apps	Goals	Apps	Goals	Apps	Goals	Apps	Goals	Apps	Goals	Apps	Goals
Flamengo	2022	Série A	0	0	1 (Note: Appearance(s) in the Campeonato Carioca.)	0	0	0	0	0	0	0	1	0
Career total			0	0	1	0	0	0	0	0	0	0	1	0
