= Lipe (footballer) =

Brazilian footballer (born 2002)

Personal information
- Full name: Felipe Florencio da Silva
- Date of birth: 19 February 2002 (age 24)
- Place of birth: Florianópolis, Brazil
- Height: 1.88 m (6 ft 2 in)
- Position: Centre-back

Team information
- Current team: Casa Pia (on loan from Porto B)
- Number: 44

Youth career
- 2012–2022: Avaí

Senior career*
Years	Team	Apps	(Gls)
2022–2023	Avaí	31	(2)
2023–2025	Gil Vicente	6	(0)
2024–2025	→ Porto B (loan)	31	(3)
2025–	Porto B	32	(1)
2026–	→ Casa Pia (loan)	0	(0)
- * Club domestic league appearances and goals as of 6 September 2026

Felipe Florencio da Silva (born 19 February 2002), known as Felipe Silva or just Lipe, is a Brazilian professional footballer who plays as a centre-back for Primeira Liga club Casa Pia on loan from Porto B.

== Club career ==
Born in Florianópolis, Santa Catarina, Lipe was an Avaí youth graduate. He made his first team debut on 19 February 2022, starting in a 2–1 Campeonato Catarinense home win over Concórdia.

On 21 March 2022, Lipe renewed his contract until 2025. He made his Série A debut on 5 November, starting in a 1–1 away draw against Santos.

On 31 August 2023, Primeira Liga club Gil Vicente announced the signing of Lipe on a four-year contract.

On 15 August 2024, Gil Vicente sent Lipe on a season-long loan with an optional buy-clause to Porto's reserve team, competing in Liga Portugal 2. At the end of the season, the buy-clause was triggered, with Lipe joining the side on a four-year contract.

== Career statistics ==
As of match played 19 August 2023

Appearances and goals by club, season and competition
Club	Season	League			State league		National cup		League cup		Total	
Club	Season	Division	Apps	Goals	Apps	Goals	Apps	Goals	Apps	Goals	Apps	Goals
Avaí	2021	Série B	2	0	0	0	0	0	—		2	0
Avaí	2022	Série A	3	1	1 (Note: Appearance(s) in Campeonato Catarinense)	0	1	0	—		5	1
Avaí	2023	Série B	15	0	8	1	1	0	—		24	1
Avaí	Total		20	1	9	1	2	0	—		31	2
Gil Vicente	2023–24	Primeira Liga	4	0	—		0	0	2	0	6	0
Porto B	2024–25	Liga Portugal 2	0	0	—		0	0	0	0	0	0
Career total			24	1	9	1	2	0	2	0	37	2
