= Léo Pereira (footballer, born 1996) =

Brazilian footballer (born 1996)

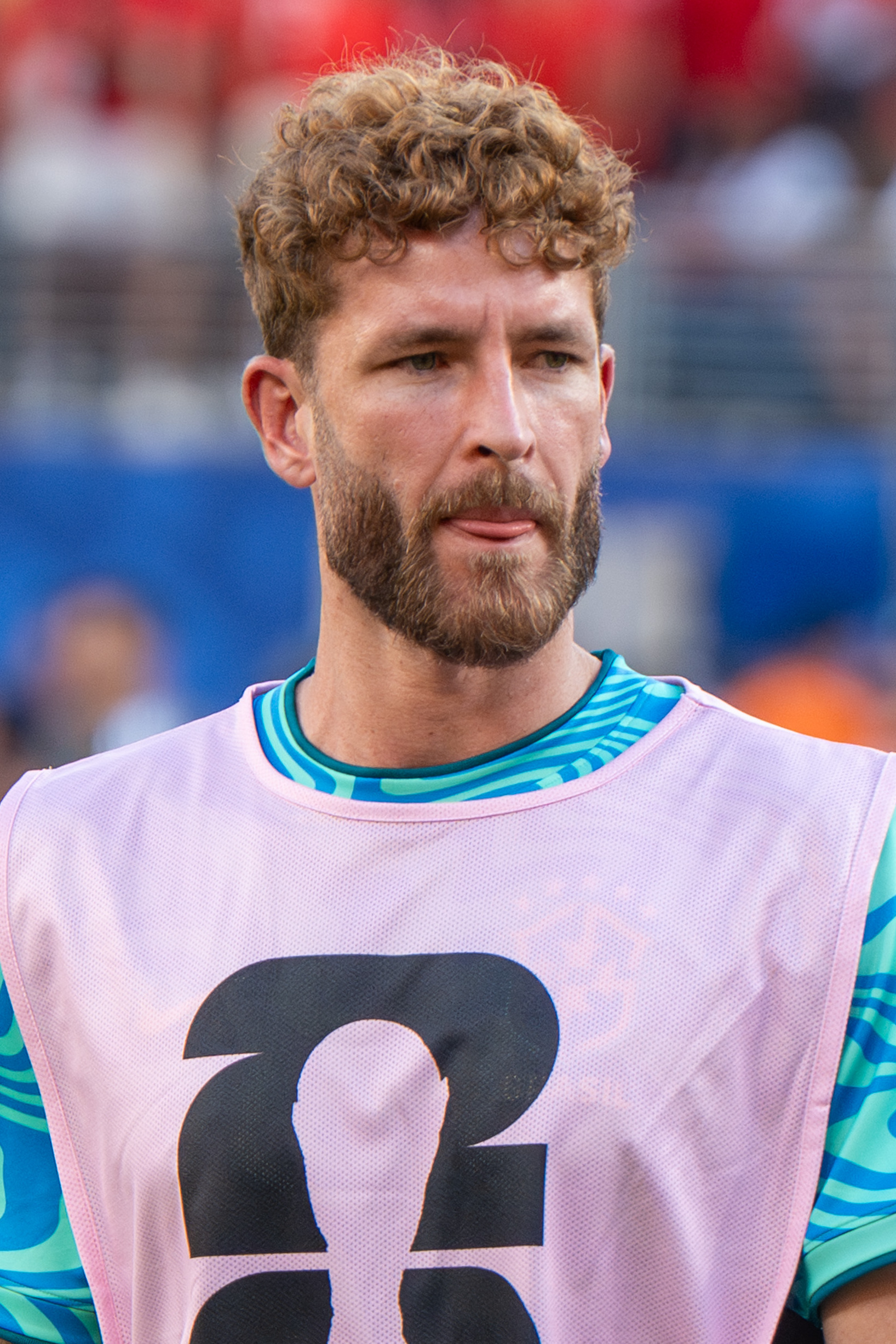
- Pereira with Brazil in 2026

Personal information
- Full name: Leonardo Pereira
- Date of birth: 31 January 1996 (age 30)
- Place of birth: Curitiba, Brazil
- Height: 1.89 m (6 ft 2 in)
- Position: Centre back

Team information
- Current team: Flamengo
- Number: 4

Youth career
- 2010–2014: Atlético Paranaense

Senior career*
Years	Team	Apps	(Gls)
2014–2019	Atlético Paranaense	80	(7)
2015	→ Guaratinguetá (loan)	8	(2)
2016	→ Náutico (loan)	5	(0)
2017	→ Orlando City B (loan)	8	(0)
2017	→ Orlando City (loan)	10	(0)
2020–	Flamengo	221	(15)

International career^{‡}
2013	Brazil U17	4	(0)
2015	Brazil U20	8	(2)
2026–	Brazil	4	(0)
- * Club domestic league appearances and goals as of 18 November 2026 ‡ National team caps and goals as of 6 June 2026

Leonardo Pereira (Portuguese pronunciation: [ˈlɛ.u peˈɾejɾɐ]; born 31 January 1996) is a Brazilian professional footballer who plays as a central defender for Campeonato Brasileiro Série A club Flamengo and the Brazil national team.

== Club career ==
=== Atlético Paranaense ===
Born in Curitiba, Paraná, Léo Pereira finished his formation with Atlético Paranaense. He made his Série A debut on 3 May 2014, replacing Marcos Guilherme in a 2–3 home loss against Cruzeiro. He went on to make a further thirteen league appearances in 2014.

==== Loans to Guaratinguetá and Náutico ====
Pereira joined Guaratinguetá of Série C on loan in August 2015 where he made eight appearances before returning to Atlético in October 2015. On 23 May 2016, he moved to Náutico also in a temporary deal.

==== Loan to Orlando City ====
On 14 March 2017, Pereira joined Orlando City B, the USL affiliate of Orlando City, on a season long loan. He was the first player to move between the two clubs since they became official partners the previous November. After beginning the season with Orlando City B, he was called up to the first team in mid-April and made his MLS debut against San Jose Earthquakes on 17 May.

==== Breakthrough ====
Back to Atlético for the 2018 season, Pereira was initially a backup under head coach Fernando Diniz, before becoming a starter under Tiago Nunes and finishing the year with six goals.

=== Flamengo ===
On 28 January 2020, Flamengo signed Pereira from Athletico Paranaense in a €6.1m transfer. On 27 January 2023, established as a first-choice, he extended his contract with the club until 31 December 2027.

In an impressive 2025 campaign, Pereira emerged as one of the most utilized players in the squad, appearing in 63 matches with 62 starts. He scored six goals and providing one assist during the year, with 22 key passes and a 92% pass completion rate.

== International career ==
=== Youth ===
Pereira has made twelve appearances across two age levels for the Brazil national team. He received his first call up to the U17s when he was selected for the 2013 South American Under-17 Football Championship in April. He made two appearances in Argentina against Peru and Venezuela. His final U17 caps came in October and November when he was called up for the 2013 FIFA U-17 World Cup in the United Arab Emirates. The first coming in the Group Stage against Honduras and the second in a quarter-final penalty shoot-out defeat to Mexico in which Pereira scored a spot-kick in the shoot-out.

Two years later Pereira appeared in five of Brazil's 2015 South American Youth Football Championship matches, with two caps coming against Colombia and the other three coming against Uruguay, Paraguay and Peru who he also scored against. Later that year he played in three of Brazil's 2015 FIFA U-20 World Cup matches. The first two came in the Group Stage against Hungary and North Korea, he scored a goal against the latter, and his last U20 World Cup cap was versus Senegal in a 5–0 semi-final win. Brazil subsequently made it to the final which they lost to Serbia, Pereira was an unused substitute.

=== Senior ===
After being included several times on the pre-lists for the national team, Pereira finally was called by Carlo Ancelotti for the main Brazil squad on 16 March 2026, for friendlies against France and Croatia, on the final months of preparation building up the squad prior to the 2026 FIFA World Cup. He made his full international debut ten days later, starting in a 2–1 loss against the former.

On 18 May 2026, Pereira was included in Ancelotti's 26-man squad for the World Cup.

== Career statistics ==
=== Club ===
As of match played 18 November 2026

Appearances and goals by club, season and competition
Club	Season	League			State league (Note: Includes Campeonato Paranaense, Campeonato Carioca)		National cup (Note: Includes Copa do Brasil)		Continental		Other		Total	
Club	Season	Division	Apps	Goals	Apps	Goals	Apps	Goals	Apps	Goals	Apps	Goals	Apps	Goals
Athletico Paranaense	2014	Série A	14	0	7	0	1	0	—		—		22	0
Athletico Paranaense	2015	Série A	0	0	2	0	1	0	—		—		3	0
Athletico Paranaense	2018	Série A	18	3	13	2	0	0	10 (Note: Appearances in Copa Sudamericana)	1	—		41	6
Athletico Paranaense	2019	Série A	26	2	0	0	7	1	8 (Note: Appearances in Copa Libertadores)	0	3 (Note: Two appearances in Recopa Sudamericana, one appearance in J.League Cup / Copa Sudamericana Championship)	0	44	3
Athletico Paranaense	Total		58	5	22	2	9	1	18	1	3	0	110	9
Guaratinguetá (loan)	2015	Série C	8	2	—		—		—		—		8	2
Náutico (loan)	2016	Série B	5	0	—		—		—		—		5	0
Orlando City B (loan)	2017	USL	8	0	—		—		—		—		8	0
Orlando City (loan)	2017	MLS	10	0	—		0	0	—		—		10	0
Flamengo	2020	Série A	13	1	10	0	4	0	6	0	1 (Note: Appearance in Recopa Sudamericana)	0	34	1
Flamengo	2021	Série A	19	0	4	0	5	0	7	0	0	0	35	0
Flamengo	2022	Série A	13	0	8	2	9	0	8	0	1 (Note: Appearance in Supercopa do Brasil)	0	39	2
Flamengo	2023	Série A	32	3	7	0	8	0	4	1	2 (Note: One appearance in FIFA Club World Cup, on appearance in Supercopa do Brasil)	0	53	4
Flamengo	2024	Série A	28	0	12	3	9	0	7	1	—		56	4
Flamengo	2025	Série A	34	4	8	0	2	0	12	1	7 (Note: One appearance in Supercopa do Brasil, three appearances in FIFA Club World Cup, three appearances and one goal in FIFA Intercontinental Cup)	1	63	6
Flamengo	2026	Série A	30	2	3	0	1	0	9	1	3 (Note: One appearance in Supercopa do Brasil, two appearances in Recopa Sudamericana)	0	46	3
Flamengo	Total		169	10	52	5	38	0	53	4	14	1	326	20
Career total			258	17	74	7	47	1	71	5	17	1	467	36

=== International ===
As of match played 6 June 2026

Appearances and goals by national team and year
National team	Year	Apps	Goals
Brazil	2026	4	0
Total		4	0

== Honours ==
Athletico Paranaense

- Copa Sudamericana: 2018
- J.League Cup / Copa Sudamericana Championship: 2019
- Copa do Brasil: 2019
- Campeonato Paranaense: 2018

Flamengo

- FIFA Challenger Cup: 2025
- FIFA Derby of the Americas: 2025
- Copa Libertadores: 2022, 2025
- Recopa Sudamericana: 2020
- Campeonato Brasileiro Série A: 2020, 2025
- Copa do Brasil: 2022, 2024
- Supercopa do Brasil: 2020, 2021, 2025
- Campeonato Carioca: 2020, 2021, 2024, 2025, 2026

Individual

- Campeonato Carioca Team of the Season: 2024, 2025, 2026
- Copa Libertadores Team of the Tournament: 2025
- Bola de Prata: 2025
- Campeonato Brasileiro Série A Team of the Year: 2025
- South American Team of the Year: 2025
