= Pedro (footballer, born 1997) =

Brazilian footballer

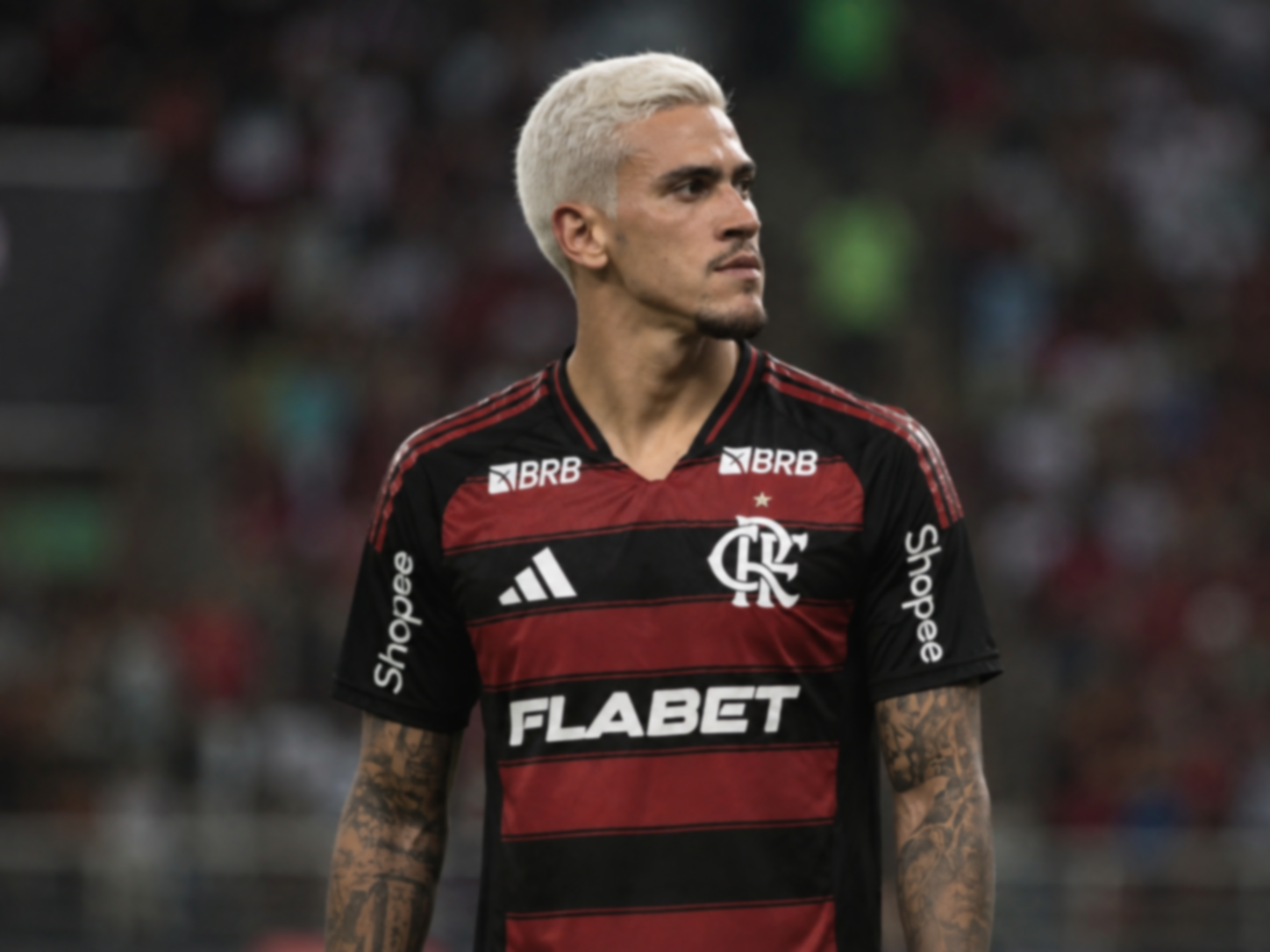
- Pedro in 2025

Personal information
- Full name: Pedro Guilherme Abreu dos Santos
- Date of birth: 20 June 1997 (age 29)
- Place of birth: Rio de Janeiro, Brazil
- Height: 1.85 m (6 ft 1 in)
- Position: Striker

Team information
- Current team: Flamengo
- Number: 9

Youth career
- 2007–2011: Flamengo
- 2012–2013: Duquecaxiense
- 2013: Artsul
- 2014–2016: Fluminense

Senior career*
Years	Team	Apps	(Gls)
2016–2019	Fluminense	70	(26)
2019–2020	Fiorentina	4	(0)
2020	→ Flamengo (loan)	54	(23)
2021–	Flamengo	202	(101)

International career^{‡}
2019–2021	Brazil U23	8	(4)
2020–	Brazil	8	(2)
- * Club domestic league appearances and goals as of 02:03, 24 July 2024 (UTC) ‡ National team caps and goals as of 21:45, 3 October 2026 (UTC)

Pedro Guilherme Abreu dos Santos (born 20 June 1997), better known as Pedro, is a Brazilian professional footballer who plays as a striker for Campeonato Brasileiro Série A club Flamengo and the Brazil national team.

He began his career with Fluminense, playing 93 total games and scoring 31 goals. In 2019, he signed for Fiorentina for €11 million, but after playing rarely in Serie A he returned to Brazil with Flamengo, initially on loan before a permanent transfer. He has won several honours with Flamengo, including two Copa Libertadores, two Campeonato Brasileiro Série A, two Copa do Brasil and five Campeonato Carioca titles.

Pedro played youth international football for Brazil at under-23 level, before making his senior international debut in November 2020. He was part of Brazil's squad at the 2022 FIFA World Cup.

== Club career ==
=== Fluminense ===
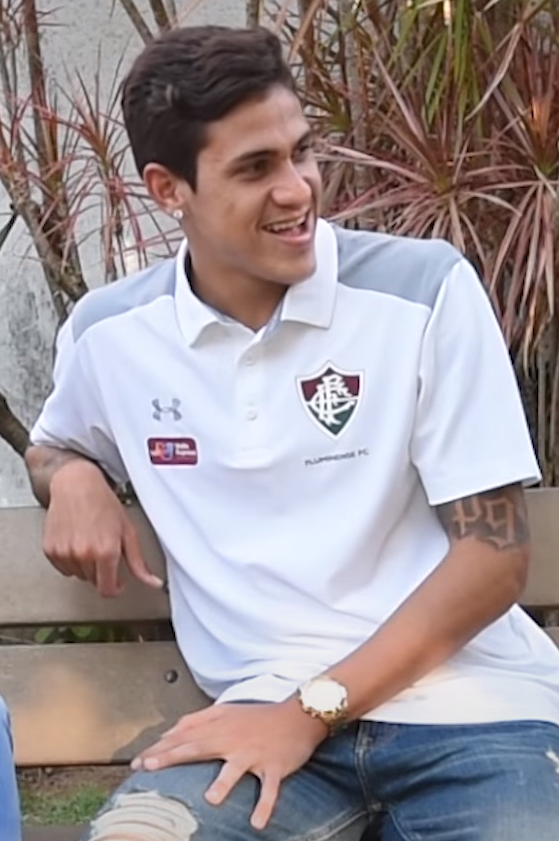
Pedro as a Fluminense player in 2018

Born in Rio de Janeiro, Pedro began his career at the age of eight in the youth ranks of Flamengo, who released him at the age of 14. He spent two years at Duquecaxiense and had a brief spell at Artsul before moving to Flamengo's rivals Fluminense.

He made his professional debut on 10 March 2016 in a 2–0 win over Criciúma in the Primeira Liga, starting the match in what was his only appearance as Fluminense won the tournament. On 26 June that year he played his first game in the Campeonato Brasileiro Série A, replacing Richarlison for the final seven minutes of a 2–1 win over rivals Flamengo, and made two more substitute appearances over the season.

On 24 January 2017, substitute Pedro scored his first professional goal in a 3–2 win over Criciúma in the Primeira Liga opener, and he added two more in ten games as they came runners-up to Flamengo in the Campeonato Carioca. On 21 September, he scored the crucial away goal in a 2–1 loss away to LDU Quito in the second leg of the round of 16 in the Copa Sudamericana, sending Flu through.

Pedro became a regular in the 2018 Campeonato Carioca season, top scoring with seven goals in 13 games, earning him a place in the Team of the Tournament. On 25 March, he opened a 3–0 win over Botafogo at the Maracanã Stadium to win the Taça Rio.

In the summer of 2018, Pedro attracted offers from other clubs, with Fluminense rejecting an €8.5 million offer from Bordeaux and a €15 million bid by Mexico's Monterrey. Despite a knee injury, he was Fluminense's top scorer of the league season with 10 goals in 19 games, and 19 in 40 games over the whole year; he was named Best Newcomer at the Prêmio Craque do Brasileirão.

=== Fiorentina ===
On 2 September 2019, Pedro joined Italian club Fiorentina on a five-year contract. The transfer fee was €11 million, of which €8 million went to Fluminense for 30% out of their 50% share in his economic rights, and the other €3 million was paid to Artsul, a third-party owner who owned the other 50%.

Pedro made his debut in Serie A on 3 November in a 1–1 home draw with Parma, replacing Kevin-Prince Boateng for the final five minutes. He played only 59 minutes in Italy.

=== Flamengo ===
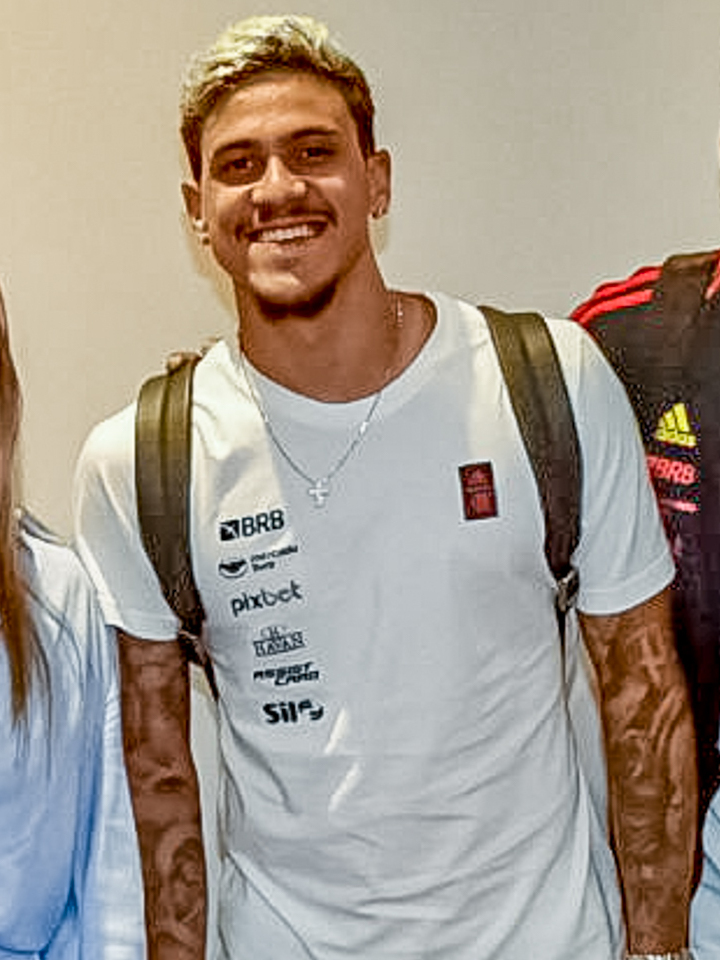
Pedro as a Flamengo player in 2023

On 23 January 2020, Pedro returned to Rio de Janeiro, joining Flamengo on loan for the rest of the year, for a fee of €1 million with the option to purchase. He made his debut on 4 February in the Campeonato Carioca, replacing Giorgian de Arrascaeta in the 65th minute away to Resende and scoring the equaliser in a 3–1 win eight minutes later. He helped his side to a 3–1 aggregate final win over Fluminense in July, scoring the opening goal.

In the 2020 Campeonato Brasileiro Série A, Pedro scored his first goals on 2 September 2020 with two in a 5–3 win at Bahia. With 13 goals, he was 7th top scorer in the league, which his team won. He was unused as the team won the Supercopa do Brasil against Athletico Paranaense, but scored from the bench in a 5–2 aggregate win over Independiente del Valle in the Recopa Sudamericana.

On 9 December 2020, Pedro signed a contract with Flamengo lasting until 2025, for a fee of €15 million. The fee was paid in instalments, with Fluminense and Artsul also receiving. Towards the end of the 2021 Campeonato Carioca, he scored all of the goals in a 3–0 win at Volta Redonda on 1 May.

On 25 January 2023, Pedro extended his contract with Flamengo until 31 December 2027.

== International career ==
Pedro was called up by coach Tite for the Brazil national team in August 2018, for friendlies against the United States and El Salvador. However, he withdrew through injury and was replaced by his former clubmate Richarlison. On 13 November 2020, he made his debut in a 2022 FIFA World Cup qualifier against Venezuela, which Brazil won 1–0.

On 17 June 2021, Pedro was named in the Brazil squad for the 2020 Summer Olympics. However, he withdrew from the squad on 2 July after Flamengo declined to release him for the tournament, and was replaced again by Richarlison.

Pedro scored his first senior international goal on 27 September 2022, in a 5–1 win over Tunisia. On 7 November, he was named in the squad for the 2022 FIFA World Cup.

== Career statistics ==
=== Club ===
As of match played 23 September 2025

Appearances and goals by club, season and competition
Club	Season	League			State league (Note: Includes Campeonato Carioca)		National cup (Note: Includes Copa do Brasil)		Continental		Other		Total	
Club	Season	Division	Apps	Goals	Apps	Goals	Apps	Goals	Apps	Goals	Apps	Goals	Apps	Goals
Fluminense	2016	Série A	3	0	0	0	0	0	—		1 (Note: Appearance(s) in Primeira Liga)	0	4	0
Fluminense	2017	Série A	15	2	10	2	3	1	5 (Note: Appearances in Copa Sudamericana)	1	2	1	35	7
Fluminense	2018	Série A	19	10	13	7	4	0	4	2	—		40	19
Fluminense	2019	Série A	10	5	0	0	2	0	2	0	—		14	5
Fluminense	Total		47	17	23	9	9	1	11	3	3	1	93	31
Fiorentina	2019–20	Serie A	4	0	—		0	0	—		—		4	0
Flamengo (loan)	2020	Série A	34	13	11	5	2	2	5 (Note: Appearances in Copa Libertadores)	2	2 (Note: Appearances in Recopa Sudamericana)	1	54	23
Flamengo	2021	Série A	24	7	8	6	4	3	10	2	0	0	46	18
Flamengo	2022	Série A	24	11	12	3	10	3	13	12	0	0	59	29
Flamengo	2023	Série A	34	13	9	9	7	5	6	3	5 (Note: One appearance and one goal in Supercopa do Brasil, two appearances and four goals in FIFA Club World Cup, two appearances in Recopa Sudamericana)	5	61	35
Flamengo	2024	Série A	21	11	12	11	4	3	6	5	—		43	30
Flamengo	2025	Série A	13	12	0	0	1	1	5	2	3 (Note: Appearances in FIFA Club World Cup)	0	22	15
Flamengo	Total		150	67	52	34	28	17	45	26	10	6	284	145
Career total			201	84	75	43	37	18	56	28	13	7	382	181

=== International ===
As of match played 3 October 2026

Appearances and goals by national team and year
National team	Year	Apps	Goals
Brazil	2020	1	0
Brazil	2022	3	1
Brazil	2023	2	0
Brazil	2026	2	1
Total		8	2

Scores and results list Brazil's goal tally first, score column indicates score after each Pedro goal.

List of international goals scored by Pedro
No.	Date	Venue	Cap	Opponent	Score	Result	Competition
1	27 September 2022	Parc des Princes, Paris, France	2	Tunisia	5–1	5–1	Friendly
2	3 October 2026	Salt Lake Stadium, Kolkata, India	8	India	2–0	4–0	Friendly

== Honours ==
Fluminense

- Primeira Liga: 2016

Flamengo

- FIFA Challenger Cup: 2025
- FIFA Derby of the Americas: 2025
- Copa Libertadores: 2022, 2025
- Recopa Sudamericana: 2020
- Campeonato Brasileiro Série A: 2020, 2025
- Copa do Brasil: 2022, 2024
- Supercopa do Brasil: 2020, 2025
- Campeonato Carioca: 2020, 2021, 2024, 2025, 2026

Brazil U23

- Toulon Tournament: 2019

Individual

- Campeonato Carioca top scorer: 2018, 2024
- Campeonato Carioca Team of the Year: 2018, 2024
- Campeonato Brasileiro Série A Best Newcomer: 2018
- Best Forward in Brazil: 2022
- Copa Libertadores top scorer: 2022
- Copa Libertadores Best player: 2022
- Copa Libertadores Team of the Tournament: 2022, 2025
- South American Team of the Year: 2022
- South American Footballer of the Year: 2022
- Copa do Brasil top scorer: 2023
- Bola de Prata: 2025
