= Lucas Calegari =

Brazilian footballer (born 2002)

Personal information
- Full name: Lucas Felipe Calegari
- Date of birth: 27 February 2002 (age 24)
- Place of birth: Cuiabá, Brazil
- Height: 1.71 m (5 ft 7 in)
- Position: Right-back

Team information
- Current team: LA Galaxy
- Number: 2

Youth career
- 2009–2014: Uirapuru
- 2014–2019: Fluminense

Senior career*
Years	Team	Apps	(Gls)
2020–2025	Fluminense	68	(1)
2023	→ LA Galaxy (loan)	22	(0)
2024–2025	→ Famalicão (loan)	18	(0)
2025–2026	Eyüpspor	23	(1)
2026–	LA Galaxy	3	(0)

International career
2019	Brazil U17	1	(0)
- * Club domestic league appearances and goals as of 21:08, 12 October 2026 (UTC)

Lucas Felipe Calegari (born 27 February 2002) is a Brazilian professional footballer who plays for Major League Soccer club LA Galaxy as a right-back.

== Playing career ==
Calegari began playing football locally at the age of 7, and started as a forward with Uirapuru. Calegari joined the youth an academy of Fluminense at the age of 12, and signed his first contract with them in December 2019. Calegari made his professional debut with Fluminense in a 1-0 Campeonato Brasileiro Série A win over Athletico Paranaense on 22 August 2020.

On 27 July 2024, it was confirmed that Calegari joined Primeira Liga club Famalicão on a one-year loan deal with a purchase option of, according to media reports, 1.5 million euros.

== International career ==
Calegari represented the Brazil U17s once in a 4–1 friendly win over the Paraguay U17s on 26 July 2019.

== Career statistics ==
As of match played 9 November 2024

Appearances and goals by club, season and competition
Club	Season	League			State league (Note: Includes Campeonato Carioca)		National cup (Note: Includes Copa do Brasil, U.S. Open Cup, Taça de Portugal)		Continental		Other		Total	
Club	Season	Division	Apps	Goals	Apps	Goals	Apps	Goals	Apps	Goals	Apps	Goals	Apps	Goals
Fluminense	2019	Série A	0	0	0	0	0	0	0	0	—		0	0
Fluminense	2020	Série A	22	0	0	0	3	0	0	0	—		25	0
Fluminense	2021	Série A	14	0	8	0	1	0	6 (Note: Appearances in Copa Libertadores)	0	—		29	0
Fluminense	2022	Série A	10	0	8	1	1	0	7 (Note: Four appearances in Copa Libertadores, three appearances in Copa Sudamericana)	0	—		26	1
Fluminense	2023	Série A	0	0	4	0	0	0	0	0	—		4	0
Fluminense	2024	Série A	2	0	0	0	0	0	0	0	—		2	0
Fluminense	Total		48	0	20	1	5	0	13	0	—		86	1
LA Galaxy (loan)	2023	MLS	22	0	—		3	0	2 (Note: Appearances in Leagues Cup)	0	—		27	0
Famalicão (loan)	2024-25	Primeira Liga	11	0	—		1	0	—		—		12	0
Career total			81	0	20	1	9	0	15	0	—		125	1
