= Lázaro (footballer, born 2002) =

Brazilian footballer

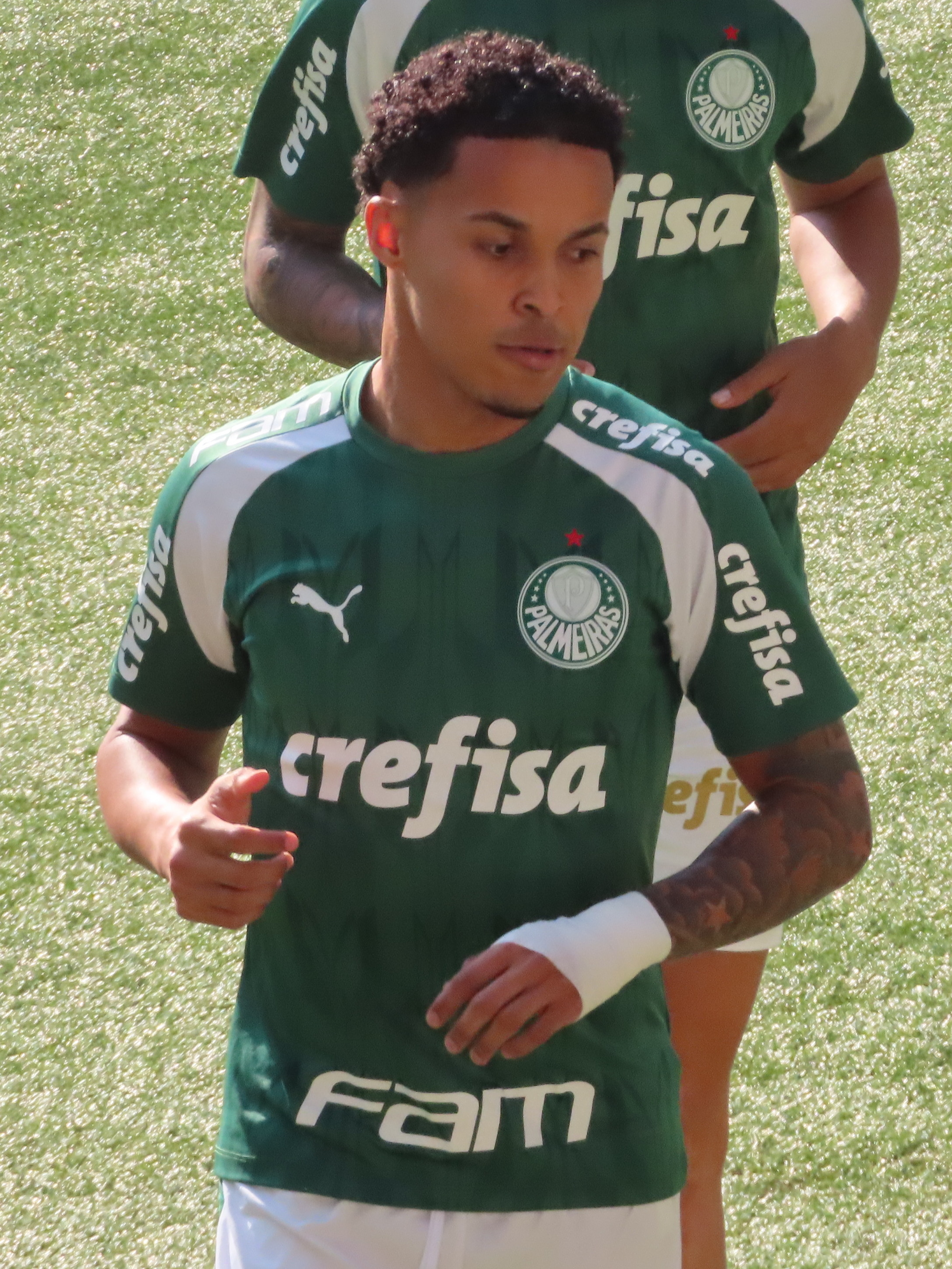

Personal information
- Full name: Lázaro Vinícius Marques
- Date of birth: 12 March 2002 (age 24)
- Place of birth: Belo Horizonte, Brazil
- Height: 1.81 m (5 ft 11 in)
- Positions: Left winger; forward

Team information
- Current team: Al-Fayha
- Number: 17

Youth career
- 2010–2021: Flamengo

Senior career*
Years	Team	Apps	(Gls)
2020–2022	Flamengo	45	(6)
2022–2025	Almería	54	(6)
2024	→ Palmeiras (loan)	25	(2)
2025–2026	Al-Najma	24	(7)
2026–	Al-Fayha	8	(3)

International career^{‡}
2017–2019	Brazil U17	5	(8)
- * Club domestic league appearances and goals as of 11 October 2026 ‡ National team caps and goals as of 19:02, 29 September 2020 (UTC)

Lázaro Vinícius Marques (born 12 March 2002), simply known as Lázaro, is Brazilian professional footballer who plays as a left winger or forward for Saudi Pro League club Al-Fayha.

== Club career ==
=== Flamengo ===
Born in Belo Horizonte, Lázaro began his career with Flamengo and made his professional debut for the club on 27 September 2020 against Palmeiras. He came on as a 79th-minute substitute for Lincoln as Flamengo drew the match 1–1.

Lázaro scored his first professional goals on 27 January 2022, netting a brace in a 2–1 Campeonato Carioca home win over Portuguesa-RJ. His first goal in the top tier came on 21 July, as he scored his team's fourth in a 4–0 home routing of Juventude.

=== Almería ===
On 1 September 2022, Lázaro moved abroad and joined La Liga club Almería on a six-year contract, for a rumoured €7 million fee, with Flamengo keeping 30% of a future transfer.

=== Al-Najma ===
On September 10, 2025, Lázaro joined Al-Najma of the Saudi Pro League on an initial €5 million, with Almería retaining a 15% sell-on clause.

== International career ==
Lázaro made his debut for Brazil at the under-17 level on 12 March 2017 against the United States U17.

== Career statistics ==
As of 10 January 2025

Appearances and goals by club, season and competition
Club	Season	League			State League		Cup		Continental		Other		Total	
Club	Season	Division	Apps	Goals	Apps	Goals	Apps	Goals	Apps	Goals	Apps	Goals	Apps	Goals
Flamengo	2020	Série A	2	0	—		1	0	1 (Note: Appearance(s) in Copa Libertadores.)	0	—		4	0
Flamengo	2021	Série A	7	0	4 (Note: Appearance(s) in Campeonato Carioca.)	0	2	0	0	0	0	0	13	0
Flamengo	2022	Série A	21	4	11	2	5	1	7	1	1 (Note: Appearance(s) in Supercopa do Brasil.)	0	45	8
Flamengo	Total		30	4	15	2	8	1	8	1	1	0	62	8
Almería	2022–23	La Liga	19	6	—		1	0	—		—		20	6
Almería	2023–24	La Liga	14	0	—		2	0	—		—		16	0
Almería	2024–25	Segunda División	0	0	—		0	0	—		—		0	0
Almería	Total		33	6	—		3	0	—		—		36	6
Palmeiras (loan)	2024	Série A	18	2	7 (Note: Appearance(s) in Campeonato Paulista.)	0	4	0	6	1	—		35	3
Career total			81	12	22	2	15	1	14	2	1	0	133	17

== Honours ==
Flamengo

- Campeonato Brasileiro Série A: 2020
- Campeonato Carioca: 2021

Palmeiras

- Campeonato Paulista: 2024

Brazil U17

- FIFA U-17 World Cup: 2019
