= 2026 U-20 Copa Libertadores =

South American under-20 club football tournament

Copa CONMEBOL Libertadores Sub-20 Ecuador 2026

Tournament details
- Host country: Ecuador
- City: Quito
- Dates: 7–22 March 2026
- Teams: 12 (from 10 associations)
- Venues: 3 (in 1 host city)

Final positions
- Champions: (Chile) Santiago Wanderers (1st title)
- Runners-up: (Brazil) Flamengo
- Third place: (Brazil) Palmeiras
- Fourth place: (Paraguay) Olimpia

Tournament statistics
- Matches played: 22
- Goals scored: 62 (2.82 per match)
- Top scorer: (Chile) Christian Silva (4 goals)

The 2026 U-20 Copa CONMEBOL Libertadores (Spanish: Copa CONMEBOL Libertadores Sub-20 2026) was the 10th edition of the U-20 CONMEBOL Libertadores (also referred to as the U-20 Copa Libertadores), South America's premier under-20 club football tournament organized by CONMEBOL. It was held in Quito, Ecuador from 7 to 22 March 2026.

Flamengo were the two-time defending champions, having won back-to-back titles in 2024 and 2025. Santiago Wanderers won their first title after beating Flamengo 5–4 on penalties after a 1–1 draw in the final match. As winners of the 2026 U-20 Copa Libertadores, Santiago Wanderers earned the right to play against the winners of the 2025–26 UEFA Youth League in the 2026 Under-20 Intercontinental Cup.

== Teams ==
The competition was contested by 12 teams: the title holders, the youth champions from each of the ten CONMEBOL member associations, and one additional team from the host association.

Association	Team	Qualifying method	App	Previous best result
Argentina	Belgrano	2025 Cuarta División (U-20) champions	2nd	Third place (2025)
Bolivia	Bolívar	2025 U-19 Liga Nacional champions	2nd	Group stage (2016)
Brazil	Flamengo (holders)	2025 U-20 Copa Libertadores champions	5th	Champions (2024, 2025)
Brazil	Palmeiras	2025 Campeonato Brasileiro Sub-20 champions	3rd	Runners-up (2025)
Chile	Santiago Wanderers	2025 Campeonato Nacional de Fútbol Formativo U-20 champions	1st	—
Colombia	Independiente Medellín	2025 Supercopa Juvenil champions	1st	—
Ecuador (hosts)	LDU Quito (Ecuador 1)	2025 Campeonato Nacional de Categorías Formativas U-19 champions	2nd	Group stage (2022)
Ecuador (hosts)	Universidad Católica (Ecuador 2)	2025 Campeonato Nacional de Categorías Formativas U-19 runners-up	1st	—
Paraguay	Olimpia	2025 Torneo Anual Juvenil champions	3rd	Group stage (2024, 2025)
Peru	Sporting Cristal	2025 Torneo Juvenil Sub-18 champions	5th	Group stage (2012, 2020, 2022, 2024)
Uruguay	Nacional	2025 Campeonato Uruguayo Juvenil Divisional A U-19 champions	4th	Champions (2018)
Venezuela	Estudiantes de Mérida	2025 U-21 Liga FUTVE Junior champions	1st	—

=== Squads ===
Each team could register a maximum of 20 and a minimum of 16 players, including at least 2 goalkeepers. Players born between 1 January 2005 and 31 December 2009 (ages 16 to 20) were eligible to compete in the tournament (Regulations Articles 48 and 51).

== Host nation and venues ==
Ecuador was confirmed as the host country for the tournament in December 2025, with Quito announced as the host city after the group draw. This was the second time that Ecuador hosted the tournament having previously done so in 2022.

The Estadio Olímpico Atahualpa and the Estadio Rodrigo Paz Delgado hosted the group stage matches, while the final stage matches were played at the Estadio Banco Guayaquil.

Quito			Locations of the venues in Quito.
Estadio Olímpico Atahualpa	Estadio Rodrigo Paz Delgado	Estadio Banco Guayaquil	Locations of the venues in Quito.
Capacity: 35,258	Capacity: 41,575	Capacity: 11,030	Locations of the venues in Quito.

== Draw ==
The draw for the group stage was held on 10 February 2026, 12:00 PYT (UTC−3), at the CONMEBOL headquarters in Luque, Paraguay and was conducted according to the following guidelines:

- The defending champions Flamengo were automatically assigned to Group A, position A1.
- The remaining 11 teams were seeded into four pots; one of two teams and three of three teams, based on the final placement of their national association's club in the previous edition of the tournament, in order to be drawn into three groups of four.
- Teams from the two best associations (Brazil and Argentina) were seeded into Pot 1 and drawn to the first position of groups B or C. The first team drawn was placed into Group B and the second team drawn placed into Group C.
- Teams from the next three associations (Uruguay, Peru and Colombia) were seeded into Pot 2 and drawn to the second position of groups A, B or C.
- Teams from the next three associations (Paraguay, Chile and Bolivia) were seeded into Pot 3 and drawn to the third position of groups A, B or C.
- Teams from the last two associations (Ecuador 1 and Venezuela) and the additional team from the host association (Ecuador 2) were seeded into Pot 4 and drawn to the fourth position of groups A, B or C.
- From pots 2, 3 and 4, the first team drawn was placed into Group A, the second team drawn placed into Group B and the final team drawn placed into Group C. Teams from the same association could not be drawn into the same group.

Pot 1	Pot 2	Pot 3	Pot 4
(Brazil) Palmeiras; (Argentina) Belgrano	(Uruguay) Nacional; (Peru) Sporting Cristal; (Colombia) Independiente Medellín	(Paraguay) Olimpia; (Chile) Santiago Wanderers; (Bolivia) Bolívar	(Ecuador) LDU Quito; (Venezuela) Estudiantes de Mérida; (Ecuador) Universidad Católica

The draw resulted in the following groups:

Group A
Pos	Team
A1	(Brazil) Flamengo
A2	(Colombia) Independiente Medellín
A3	(Bolivia) Bolívar
A4	(Venezuela) Estudiantes de Mérida

Group B
Pos	Team
B1	(Brazil) Palmeiras
B2	(Peru) Sporting Cristal
B3	(Paraguay) Olimpia
B4	(Ecuador) Universidad Católica

Group C
Pos	Team
C1	(Argentina) Belgrano
C2	(Uruguay) Nacional
C3	(Chile) Santiago Wanderers
C4	(Ecuador) LDU Quito

== Match officials ==
On 19 February 2026, the CONMEBOL Referee Commission announced a total of 11 referees and 22 assistant referees appointed for the tournament, including a Spanish refereeing team from UEFA as part of the continuation of the UEFA–CONMEBOL memorandum of understanding signed in February 2020, which included a referee exchange programme since 2021.

- (Argentina) Sebastián Martínez
  - Assistants: Juan Mamani and Mariana de Almeida
- (Bolivia) Gabriel Mendoza
  - Assistants: Willian Medina and María Cabezas
- (Brazil) Andreza Siqueira
  - Assistants: Victor Imazu and Fernanda Kruger
- (Chile) Diego Flores
  - Assistants: Carlos Venegas and Wladimir Muñoz
- (Colombia) José Ortiz
  - Assistants: Cristian Aguirre and Nataly Arteaga
- (Ecuador) Yerson Zambrano
  - Assistants: Edison Vásquez and Viviana Segura
- (Paraguay) Derlis Benítez
  - Assistants: José Villagra and Nancy Fernández
- (Peru) Jordi Espinoza
  - Assistants: Diego Jaimes and José Castillo
- (Spain) Mateo Busquets
  - Assistants: Iván Massó and Carlos Álvarez
- (Uruguay) Hernán Heras
  - Assistants: Mathías Muníz and Belén Clavijo
- (Venezuela) Yender Herrera
  - Assistants: José Martínez and Erizon Nieto

== Group stage ==
The winners of each group and the best runner-up among all groups advanced to the semi-finals.

Tiebreakers

In the group stage, teams were ranked according to points earned (3 points for a win, 1 point for a draw, 0 points for a loss). If tied on points, tiebreakers were applied in the following order (Regulations Articles 20, 21):

1. Head-to-head result in games between tied teams;
  - Head-to-head points in the matches played among the tied teams;
  - Head-to-head goal difference in the matches played among the tied teams;
  - Head-to-head goals scored in the matches played among the tied teams;
2. Goal difference;
3. Goals scored;
4. Fewest number of red cards received;
5. Fewest number of yellow cards received;
6. Drawing of lots.

All match times are local, ECT (UTC−5), as listed by CONMEBOL.

=== Group A ===
Pos	Team	Pld	W	D	L	GF	GA	GD	Pts	Qualification
1	(Brazil) Flamengo	3	2	1	0	8	2	+6	7	Semi-finals
2	(Colombia) Independiente Medellín	3	1	1	1	1	1	0	4	
3	(Bolivia) Bolívar	3	1	0	2	4	5	−1	3 (Note: Head-to-head points: Bolívar 3, Estudiantes de Mérida 0.)	
4	(Venezuela) Estudiantes de Mérida	3	1	0	2	2	7	−5	3	

Source: CONMEBOL
Notes:
7 March 2026
17:00

Independiente Medellín (Colombia)	1–0	(Bolivia) Bolívar
Martínez 84'	Report

Estadio Rodrigo Paz Delgado, Quito
Referee: Derlis Benítez (Paraguay)
7 March 2026
19:00

Flamengo (Brazil)	4–1	(Venezuela) Estudiantes de Mérida
Da Mata 17'; Ryan Roberto 45+2'; Alan Santos 59'; Pablo Lúcio 90+4'	Report	Zambrano 20'

Estadio Olímpico Atahualpa, Quito
Referee: Hernán Heras (Uruguay)

10 March 2026
17:00

Bolívar (Bolivia)	1–4	(Brazil) Flamengo
Cronenbold 33'	Report	Ryan Roberto 4'; Josmar 9'; Alan Santos 90'; Da Mata 90+4'

Estadio Rodrigo Paz Delgado, Quito
Referee: Jordi Espinoza (Peru)
10 March 2026
19:00

Independiente Medellín (Colombia)	0–1	(Venezuela) Estudiantes de Mérida
	Report	Izarra 72'

Estadio Olímpico Atahualpa, Quito
Referee: Yerson Zambrano (Ecuador)

13 March 2026
17:00

Estudiantes de Mérida (Venezuela)	0–3	(Bolivia) Bolívar
	Report	Sosa 53'; Borhen 83'; Espinoza 90+1'

Estadio Rodrigo Paz Delgado, Quito
Referee: Mateo Busquets (Spain)
13 March 2026
19:00

Flamengo (Brazil)	0–0	(Colombia) Independiente Medellín
	Report

Estadio Olímpico Atahualpa, Quito
Referee: Diego Flores (Chile)

=== Group B ===
Pos	Team	Pld	W	D	L	GF	GA	GD	Pts	Qualification
1	(Brazil) Palmeiras	3	2	1	0	7	1	+6	7	Semi-finals
2	(Paraguay) Olimpia	3	2	0	1	5	2	+3	6	Semi-finals
3	(Ecuador) Universidad Católica	3	1	0	2	2	6	−4	3	
4	(Peru) Sporting Cristal	3	0	1	2	2	7	−5	1	

Source: CONMEBOL
8 March 2026
17:00

Sporting Cristal (Peru)	1–4	(Paraguay) Olimpia
Mellán 11'	Report	Freyres 31'; Gamarra 37'; Barone 41'; Melida 87'

Estadio Rodrigo Paz Delgado, Quito
Referee: Diego Flores (Chile)
8 March 2026
19:00

Palmeiras (Brazil)	5–0	(Ecuador) Universidad Católica
Heittor 14', 36'; Riande 60' (o.g.); Bumbila 85' (o.g.); Eduardo 88'	Report

Estadio Olímpico Atahualpa, Quito
Referee: Yender Herrera (Venezuela)

11 March 2026
17:00

Olimpia (Paraguay)	0–1	(Brazil) Palmeiras
	Report	Erick Belé 76' (pen.)

Estadio Rodrigo Paz Delgado, Quito
Referee: Sebastián Martínez (Argentina)
11 March 2026
19:00

Sporting Cristal (Peru)	0–2	(Ecuador) Universidad Católica
	Report	Charcopa 2'; Barreto 50'

Estadio Olímpico Atahualpa, Quito
Referee: José Ortiz (Colombia)

14 March 2026
16:30

Palmeiras (Brazil)	1–1	(Peru) Sporting Cristal
Felipe Teresa 66'	Report	Rodríguez 51'

Estadio Olímpico Atahualpa, Quito
Referee: Yender Herrera (Venezuela)
14 March 2026
19:30

Universidad Católica (Ecuador)	0–1	(Paraguay) Olimpia
	Report	Aranda 90+5'

Estadio Olímpico Atahualpa, Quito
Referee: Hernán Heras (Uruguay)

=== Group C ===
Pos	Team	Pld	W	D	L	GF	GA	GD	Pts	Qualification
1	(Chile) Santiago Wanderers	3	2	1	0	7	3	+4	7	Semi-finals
2	(Uruguay) Nacional	3	2	0	1	6	5	+1	6	
3	(Ecuador) LDU Quito	3	0	2	1	5	6	−1	2	
4	(Argentina) Belgrano	3	0	1	2	3	7	−4	1	

Source: CONMEBOL
9 March 2026
17:00

Belgrano (Argentina)	1–1	(Ecuador) LDU Quito
Santino 17'	Report	R. Mina 26'

Estadio Rodrigo Paz Delgado, Quito
Referee: Gabriel Mendoza (Bolivia)
9 March 2026
19:00

Nacional (Uruguay)	0–2	(Chile) Santiago Wanderers
	Report	Valenzuela 35'; Avendaño 90+3' (pen.)

Estadio Olímpico Atahualpa, Quito
Referee: Mateo Busquets (Spain)

12 March 2026
17:00

Nacional (Uruguay)	2–1	(Ecuador) LDU Quito
Soria 21'; J. García 23'	Report	Méndez 60'

Estadio Rodrigo Paz Delgado, Quito
Referee: Derlis Benítez (Paraguay)
12 March 2026
19:00

Santiago Wanderers (Chile)	2–0	(Argentina) Belgrano
Flores 53'; Silva 87' (pen.)	Report

Estadio Olímpico Atahualpa, Quito
Referee: Andreza Siqueira (Brazil)

15 March 2026
17:00

LDU Quito (Ecuador)	3–3	(Chile) Santiago Wanderers
Pineda 23', 24'; Méndez 39'	Report	Adasme 35'; Vanegas 45'; Silva 90+2' (pen.)

Estadio Rodrigo Paz Delgado, Quito
Referee: Jordi Espinoza (Peru)
15 March 2026
19:00

Belgrano (Argentina)	2–4	(Uruguay) Nacional
Gaona 79'; Mendieta 90+6'	Report	Dalmás 35'; Núñez 50' (pen.), 65', 83' (pen.)

Estadio Olímpico Atahualpa, Quito
Referee: José Ortiz (Colombia)

=== Ranking of group runners-up ===
Pos	Grp	Team	Pld	W	D	L	GF	GA	GD	Pts	Qualification
1	B	(Paraguay) Olimpia	3	2	0	1	5	2	+3	6	Semi-finals
2	C	(Uruguay) Nacional	3	2	0	1	6	5	+1	6	
3	A	(Colombia) Independiente Medellín	3	1	1	1	1	1	0	4	

Source: CONMEBOL
Rules for classification: 1) Points; 2) Goal difference; 3) Goals scored; 4) Fewest red cards; 5) Fewest yellow cards; 6) Drawing of lots (Regulations Article 22).

== Final stage ==
The final stage was played on a single-elimination basis and consisted of the semi-finals, third place match and the final. If a match was tied at the end of regular playing time, the winner would be decided directly by a penalty shoot-out (no extra time would be played) (Regulations Article 24). The semi-final matchups were:

- Semi-final 1 (SF1): Group A winner vs. Best runner-up
- Semi-final 2 (SF2): Group B winner vs. Group C winner

=== Bracket ===
Semi-finals
19 March
(Brazil) Flamengo	2
(Paraguay) Olimpia	1
19 March
(Brazil) Palmeiras	1
(Chile) Santiago Wanderers	2

Final
22 March
(Brazil) Flamengo	1 (4)
(Chile) Santiago Wanderers	1 (5)
Third place
22 March
(Paraguay) Olimpia	1 (2)
(Brazil) Palmeiras	1 (4)

=== Semi-finals ===
19 March 2026
14:00

Flamengo (Brazil)	2–1	(Paraguay) Olimpia
Ryan Roberto 12'; Pablo Lúcio 73'	Report	Barone 20' (pen.)

Estadio Banco Guayaquil, Quito
Referee: Mateo Busquets (Spain)

19 March 2026
18:30

Palmeiras (Brazil)	1–2	(Chile) Santiago Wanderers
Riquelme Fillipi 15'	Report	Silva 63' (pen.), 72'

Estadio Banco Guayaquil, Quito
Referee: José Ortiz (Colombia)

=== Third place match ===
22 March 2026

Olimpia (Paraguay)	1–1	(Brazil) Palmeiras
Freyres 82'	Report	Victor Gabriel 68'
Penalties
Grance (penalty missed); Cardozo (penalty scored); Freyres (penalty missed); Martínez (penalty scored)	2–4	(penalty scored) Victor Gabriel; (penalty scored) Felipe Teresa; (penalty scored) Juliano; (penalty scored) Benedetti

Estadio Banco Guayaquil, Quito
Referee: Yender Herrera (Venezuela)

=== Final ===
22 March 2026

Flamengo (Brazil)	1–1	(Chile) Santiago Wanderers
Alan Santos 66'	Report	S. Vargas 89'
Penalties
João Victor (penalty missed); De Mata (penalty scored); Sales (penalty scored); Gomes (penalty scored); Camargo (penalty scored)	4–5	(penalty scored) Silva; (penalty scored) V. Vargas; (penalty scored) Avendaño; (penalty scored) Valenzuela; (penalty scored) Flores

Estadio Banco Guayaquil, Quito
Referee: Hernán Heras (Uruguay)

== Statistics ==
=== Goalscorers ===
There were 62 goals scored in 22 matches, for an average of 2.82 goals per match.

4 goals

- (Chile) Christian Silva (Santiago Wanderers)

3 goals

- (Uruguay) Pavel Núñez (Nacional)
- (Brazil) Ryan Roberto (Flamengo)
- (Brazil) Alan Santos (Flamengo)

2 goals

- (Paraguay) Faustino Barone (Olimpia)
- (Brazil) Da Mata (Flamengo)
- (Paraguay) Milán Freyres (Olimpia)
- (Brazil) Heittor (Palmeiras)
- (Ecuador) Jarold Méndez (LDU Quito)
- (Brazil) Pablo Lúcio (Flamengo)
- (Ecuador) Kevin Pineda (LDU Quito)

1 goal

- (Chile) Benjamín Adasme (Santiago Wanderers)
- (Paraguay) Thiago Aranda (Olimpia)
- (Chile) Lucas Avendaño (Santiago Wanderers)
- (Ecuador) Andry Barreto (Universidad Católica)
- (Brazil) Erick Belé (Palmeiras)
- (Bolivia) Antonio Borhen (Bolívar)
- (Ecuador) Keiner Charcopa (Universidad Católica)
- (Bolivia) Ronald Cronenbold (Bolívar)
- (Uruguay) Jonathan Dalmás (Nacional)
- (Brazil) Eduardo (Palmeiras)
- (Bolivia) Matías Espinoza (Bolívar)
- (Brazil) Felipe Teresa (Palmeiras)
- (Chile) Ignacio Flores (Santiago Wanderers)
- (Paraguay) Junior Gamarra (Olimpia)
- (Argentina) Tiago Gaona (Belgrano)
- (Uruguay) Juan Ignacio García (Nacional)
- (Venezuela) Ander Izarra (Estudiantes de Mérida)
- (Brazil) Josmar (Flamengo)
- (Colombia) Santiago Martínez (Independiente Medellín)
- (Peru) Josemaría Mellán (Sporting Cristal)
- (Paraguay) Ever Melida (Olimpia)
- (Argentina) Fabricio Mendieta (Belgrano)
- (Ecuador) Ruddy Mina (LDU Quito)
- (Brazil) Riquelme Fillipi (Palmeiras)
- (Peru) Mateo Rodríguez (Sporting Cristal)
- (Argentina) Mateo Santino (Belgrano)
- (Uruguay) Mateo Soria (Nacional)
- (Bolivia) Iker Sosa (Bolívar)
- (Chile) Cristopher Valenzuela (Santiago Wanderers)
- (Chile) Víctor Vanegas (Santiago Wanderers)
- (Chile) Sebastián Vargas (Santiago Wanderers)
- (Brazil) Victor Gabriel (Palmeiras)
- (Venezuela) Néstor Zambrano (Estudiantes de Mérida)

1 own goal

- (Ecuador) Eduardo Bumbila (Universidad Católica, against Palmeiras)
- (Ecuador) Paulo Riande (Universidad Católica, against Palmeiras)
