= 2025 Under-20 Intercontinental Cup =

Football match

Flamengo	Barcelona
(Brazil)	(Spain)
2	2
- Flamengo won 6–5 on penalties
- Date: 23 August 2025
- Venue: Maracanã, Rio de Janeiro
- Referee: Jhon Ospina (Colombia)
- Attendance: 45,656
- Weather: Partly cloudy 29 °C (84 °F)

The 2025 Under-20 Intercontinental Cup (Spanish: Sub-20 Intercontinental 2025) was the fourth edition of the UEFA–CONMEBOL Under-20 Intercontinental Cup, an annual one-off football match organised by CONMEBOL and UEFA between the winners of the U-20 Copa Libertadores and UEFA Youth League. As host confederation, CONMEBOL was in charge of the main organization of this edition.

The match was played on 23 August 2025 at Maracanã Stadium in Rio de Janeiro, Brazil, between the Brazilian team Flamengo, the 2025 U-20 Copa Libertadores champions and the title holders having won the previous edition, and Spanish team Barcelona, the 2024–25 UEFA Youth League champions.

Flamengo successfully defended their title after defeating Barcelona by a 6–5 on a penalty shoot-out.

== Background ==
Flamengo will be making its second consecutive appearance in the U-20 Intercontinental Cup, which it reached on 16 March 2025 when they were crowned two-time champions of the U-20 Copa Libertadores after beating fellow Brazilian side Palmeiras 3–2 on penalties following a 1–1 draw in the final of the 2025 edition. Flamengo will be looking to defend the Under-20 Intercontinental title it won in the previous edition by defeating Greek side Olympiacos 2–1.

On the other hand, Barcelona won their third UEFA Youth League title on 28 April 2025 with a 4–1 victory over Turkish side Trabzonspor in the final of the 2024–25 UEFA Youth League, thus securing their participation in the 2025 U-20 Intercontinental Cup. It will be the first appearance of a Spanish team in this competition.

=== Participating teams ===
Team	Qualification	Previous participations (bold indicates winners)
(Brazil) Flamengo	2025 U-20 Copa Libertadores champions	1 (**2024**)
(Spain) Barcelona	2024–25 UEFA Youth League champions	None

== Pre-match ==
=== Officials ===
The officiating team will be appointed by the CONMEBOL Referee Commission; only referees in the FIFA International Referees List will be eligible. On 19 August 2025, CONMEBOL announced the refereeing team with Colombian official Jhon Ospina as the referee for the match. Ospina is a FIFA referee since 2019. He was joined by his fellow Colombians Richard Ortiz and David Fuentes as assistant referees and Mary Blanco as the fifth official, while Peruvian Roberto Pérez was the fourth official. Augusto Menéndez acted as the video assistant referee (VAR) and Milagros Arruela was the assistant VAR official (AVAR), both also from Peru.

=== Squads ===
Each team had to submit their list of 23 players (including at least three goalkeepers) to its respective confederation by 18 August 2025, 19:00 UTC−3 (BRT) or 24:00 UTC+2 (CEST), as appropriate. Only players born on or after 1 January 2005 were eligible to compete. Teams were permitted to make player replacements in cases of serious injuries up to 24 hours prior the start of the match, provided that it was approved by the CONMEBOL Chief Medical Officer and the team doctor concerned.

Barcelona announced their squad on 18 August and was unable to count on Dro Fernández, Toni Fernández, Guille Fernández and Jofre Torrents at the express request of first-team coach Hansi Flick. Flamengo announced their squad on 19 August with 13 players remaining from the team that competed in the previous edition with the only absence of Wallace Yan, requested by coach Filipe Luís to stay with the first-team.

== Match ==
=== Details ===
23 August 2025
16:30 UTC−3

Flamengo (Brazil)	2–2	(Spain) Barcelona
Lorran 11'; Iago 90+7'	CONMEBOL; UEFA	Virgili 71'; Cortés 90+5'
Penalties
João Victor (penalty scored); Iago (penalty scored); Pablo Lúcio (penalty scored); Teresa (penalty scored); Gonçalves (penalty missed); Lorran (penalty scored); Carbone (penalty scored)	6–5	(penalty scored) Virgili; (penalty missed) Hernandéz; (penalty scored) Oduro; (penalty scored) Cortés; (penalty scored) Kluivert; (penalty scored) Nomoko; (penalty missed) Parriego

Maracanã, Rio de Janeiro
Attendance: 45,656
Referee: Jhon Ospina (Colombia)

Flamengo	Barcelona

GK	1	(Brazil) Léo Nanetti
RB	2	(Brazil) Daniel Sales
CB	4	(Brazil) João Victor
CB	3	(Brazil) Iago (c)	(yellow card) 90+8'
LB	6	(Brazil) Gusttavo		(substituted off) 57'
CM	5	(Brazil) João Alves		(substituted off) 78'
CM	8	(Brazil) Guilherme Gomes	(yellow card) 35'	(substituted off) 64'
RW	11	(Brazil) Lorran
AM	10	(Brazil) Matheus Gonçalves
LW	7	(Brazil) Joshua		(substituted off) 78'
CF	18	(Brazil) Pedro Leão	(yellow card) 47'	(substituted off) 57'
Substitutes:
GK	20	(Brazil) Lucas Furtado
GK	22	(Brazil) Eduardo Jung
DF	13	(Brazil) Wanderson
DF	14	(Brazil) Da Mata
DF	16	(Brazil) Carbone		(substituted on) 57'
MF	15	(Brazil) Fabiano		(substituted on) 78'
MF	21	(Brazil) Pablo Lúcio	(yellow card) 90+3'	(substituted on) 64'
MF	25	(Brazil) Kaio Nóbrega
FW	9	(Brazil) Felipe Teresa		(substituted on) 78'
FW	17	(Brazil) Ryan Roberto
FW	19	(Nigeria) Shola Ogundana		(substituted on) 57'
FW	23	(Brazil) Douglas Telles
Manager:
Bruno Pivetti

GK	13	(Spain) Eder Aller
RB	2	(Spain) Xavi Espart
CB	4	(Spain) Andrés Cuenca
CB	15	(Spain) Álvaro Cortés (c)
LB	3	(Spain) Landry Farré		(substituted off) 90+4'
CM	18	(Spain) Pedro Rodríguez	(yellow card) 40'	(substituted off) 46'
CM	8	(Spain) Brian Fariñas		(substituted off) 88'
CM	10	(Spain) Quim Junyent		(substituted off) 46'
RF	7	(Spain) Jan Virgili
CF	9	(Spain) Òscar Gistau		(substituted off) 79'
LF	11	(Spain) Juan Hernandéz
Substitutes:
GK	25	(Spain) Gerard Sala
GK	30	(Spain) Max Bonfill
DF	5	(England) Alexander Walton
DF	12	(Spain) Guillem Victor
DF	14	(Spain) Alexis Olmedo
DF	20	(Spain) Alex Campos
DF	24	(Ghana) David Oduro		(substituted on) 90+4'
MF	6	(Spain) Tommy Marqués		(substituted on) 46'
MF	16	(Spain) Marcos Parriego		(substituted on) 88'
FW	17	(Netherlands) Shane Kluivert	(yellow card) 85'	(substituted on) 46'
FW	19	(Spain) Adrián Guerrero
FW	21	(Spain) Sama Nomoko		(substituted on) 79'
Manager:
Juliano Belletti

Assistant referees:
Richard Ortiz (Colombia)
David Fuentes (Colombia)
Fourth official:
Roberto Pérez (Peru)
Fifth official:
Mary Blanco (Colombia)
Video assistant referee:
Augusto Menéndez (Peru)
Assistant video assistant referee:
Milagros Arruela (Peru)

Match rules:

- 90 minutes
- Extra time would not be played
- Penalty shoot-out if tied after 90 minutes
- Eleven named substitutes
- Maximum of five substitutions (Note: Each team was given only three opportunities to make substitutions, excluding substitutions made at half-time.)
