= 2025 U-20 Copa Libertadores =

South American under-20 club football tournament

Copa CONMEBOL Libertadores Sub-20 Paraguay 2025

Tournament details
- Host country: Paraguay
- Dates: 1–16 March 2025
- Teams: 12 (from 10 associations)
- Venues: 3 (in 3 host cities)

Final positions
- Champions: (Brazil) Flamengo (2nd title)
- Runners-up: (Brazil) Palmeiras
- Third place: (Argentina) Belgrano
- Fourth place: (Uruguay) Danubio

Tournament statistics
- Matches played: 22
- Goals scored: 63 (2.86 per match)
- Top scorer(s): (Argentina) Leandro Monzón (Brazil) Riquelme Fillipi (4 goals each)

The 2025 U-20 Copa CONMEBOL Libertadores (Spanish: Copa CONMEBOL Libertadores Sub-20 2025) was the 9th edition of the U-20 CONMEBOL Libertadores (also referred to as the U-20 Copa Libertadores), South America's premier under-20 club football tournament organized by CONMEBOL. It was held in Paraguay from 1 to 16 March 2025.

Defending champions Flamengo successfully retained their title, defeating fellow Brazilian side Palmeiras 3–2 on penalties following a 1–1 draw in regular time in the final. As winners of the 2025 U-20 Copa Libertadores, Flamengo earned the right to play against the winners of the 2024–25 UEFA Youth League in the 2025 Under-20 Intercontinental Cup.

== Teams ==
The competition will be contested by 12 teams: the title holders, the youth champions from each of the ten CONMEBOL member associations, and one additional team from the host association.

Association	Team	Qualifying method	App	Previous best result
Argentina	Belgrano	2024 Cuarta División (U-20) champions	1st	—
Bolivia	Blooming	2024 U-19 Liga Nacional champions	3rd	Group stage (2012, 2022)
Brazil	Flamengo (holders)	2024 U-20 Copa Libertadores champions	4th	Champions (2024)
Brazil	Palmeiras	2024 Campeonato Brasileiro Sub-20 champions	2nd	Group stage (2023)
Chile	O'Higgins	2024 Supercopa Proyección winners	2nd	Group stage (2023)
Colombia	Fortaleza	2024 Supercopa Juvenil champions	1st	—
Ecuador	Independiente del Valle	2024 Campeonato Nacional de Categorías Formativas U-19 champions	8th	Champions (2020)
Paraguay (hosts)	Cerro Porteño (Paraguay 1)	2024 Torneo Annual Juvenil champions	5th	Third place (2023)
Paraguay (hosts)	Olimpia (Paraguay 2)	2024 Torneo Annual Juvenil runners-up	2nd	Group stage (2024)
Peru	Universitario	2024 Torneo de Promoción y Reserva champions	3rd	Champions (2011)
Uruguay	Danubio	2024 Campeonato Uruguayo Juvenil Divisional A U-19 champions	2nd	Group stage (2020)
Venezuela	Metropolitanos	2024 U-21 Liga FUTVE Junior champions	1st	—

1. Chile (CHI): Chile's berth was decided in a play-off match between O'Higgins, the 2024 Campeonato Nacional Proyección Apertura champions, and Colo-Colo, the 2024 Campeonato Nacional Proyección Clausura champions.

=== Squads ===
Each team could register a maximum of 20 and a minimum of 16 players, including at least 2 goalkeepers. Players born between 1 January 2005 and 31 December 2009 (ages 16 to 20) were eligible to compete in the tournament (Regulations Articles 48 and 51).

== Host nation and venues ==
Paraguay was announced as the host country for the tournament on 17 September 2024 following the CONMEBOL Council held on the same day. This will be the third time that Paraguay hosts the tournament having previously done so in 2016 and 2020.

San Lorenzo and Ypané were selected as host cities, with the Estadio Gunther Vogel and the Estadio CARFEM being the venues for the matches. The Estadio Arsenio Erico in Asunción was added as venue for the final stage.

Ypané	Location of the host cities.	San Lorenzo	Asunción
Estadio CARFEM	Location of the host cities.	Estadio Gunther Vogel	Estadio Arsenio Erico
Capacity: 5,000	Location of the host cities.	Capacity: 5,000	Capacity: 7,000

== Draw ==
The draw for the group stage was held on 4 February 2025, 12:00 PYT (UTC−3), at the CONMEBOL headquarters in Luque, Paraguay. The draw was conducted according to the following guidelines:

- The defending champions Flamengo were automatically assigned to Group A, position A1.
- The remaining 11 teams were seeded into four pots; one of two teams and three of three teams, based on the final placement of their national association's club in the previous edition of the tournament, in order to be drawn into three groups of four.
- Teams from the two best associations (Brazil and Argentina) were seeded into Pot 1 and drawn to the first position of groups B or C. The first team drawn was placed into Group B and the second team drawn placed into Group C.
- Teams from the next three associations (Ecuador, Venezuela and Chile) were seeded into Pot 2 and drawn to the second position of groups A, B or C.
- Teams from the next three associations (Paraguay 1, Uruguay and Colombia) were seeded into Pot 3 and drawn to the third position of groups A, B or C.
- Teams from the last two associations (Peru and Bolivia) and the additional team from the host association (Paraguay 2) were seeded into Pot 4 and drawn to the fourth position of groups A, B or C.
- From pots 2, 3 and 4, the first team drawn was placed into Group A, the second team drawn placed into Group B and the final team drawn placed into Group C. Teams from the same association could not be drawn into the same group.

Pot 1	Pot 2	Pot 3	Pot 4
(Brazil) Palmeiras; (Argentina) Belgrano	(Ecuador) Independiente del Valle; (Venezuela) Metropolitanos; (Chile) O'Higgins	(Paraguay) Cerro Porteño; (Uruguay) Danubio; (Colombia) Fortaleza	(Peru) Universitario; (Bolivia) Blooming; (Paraguay) Olimpia

The draw resulted in the following groups:

Group A
Pos	Team
A1	(Brazil) Flamengo
A2	(Chile) O'Higgins
A3	(Uruguay) Danubio
A4	(Paraguay) Olimpia

Group B
Pos	Team
B1	(Argentina) Belgrano
B2	(Venezuela) Metropolitanos
B3	(Colombia) Fortaleza
B4	(Peru) Universitario

Group C
Pos	Team
C1	(Brazil) Palmeiras
C2	(Ecuador) Independiente del Valle
C3	(Paraguay) Cerro Porteño
C4	(Bolivia) Blooming

== Match officials ==
On 10 February 2025, the CONMEBOL Referee Commission announced a total of 11 referees and 22 assistant referees appointed for the tournament, including a Spanish refereeing team from UEFA as part of the continuation of the UEFA–CONMEBOL memorandum of understanding signed in February 2020, which included a referee exchange programme since 2021.

- (Argentina) Sebastián Zunino
  - Assistants: Sebastián Raineri and Daiana Milone
- (Bolivia) Dilio Rodríguez
  - Assistants: Jesús Antelo and William Medina
- (Brazil) Rafael Klein
  - Assistants: Fabrini Bevilaqua Costa and Alex Ang
- (Chile) Fernando Véjar
  - Assistants: Alan Sandoval and Carlos Poblete
- (Colombia) Carlos Ortega
  - Assistants: Cristian Aguirre and Roberto Padilla
- (Ecuador) Juan Carlos Andrade
  - Assistants: Mauricio Lozada and Juan Aguiar
- (Paraguay) Blas Romero
  - Assistants: Julio Aranda and Nadia Weiler
- (Peru) Augusto Menéndez
  - Assistants: José Castillo and Diego Jaimes
- (Spain) Javier Alberola Rojas
  - Assistants: Alfredo Rodríguez and Diego Sánchez
- (Uruguay) Javier Feres
  - Assistants: Héctor Bergalo and Daiana Fernández
- (Venezuela) Alejandro Velásquez
  - Assistants: Erizon Nieto and José Martínez

== Group stage ==
The winners of each group and the best runner-up among all groups advanced to the semi-finals.

Tiebreakers

In the group stage, teams were ranked according to points earned (3 points for a win, 1 point for a draw, 0 points for a loss). If tied on points, tiebreakers were applied in the following order (Regulations Articles 20, 21):

1. Head-to-head result in games between tied teams;
  - Head-to-head points in the matches played among the tied teams;
  - Head-to-head goal difference in the matches played among the tied teams;
  - Head-to-head goals scored in the matches played among the tied teams;
2. Goal difference;
3. Goals scored;
4. Fewest number of red cards received;
5. Fewest number of yellow cards received;
6. Drawing of lots.

All match times are local, PYT (UTC−3), as listed by CONMEBOL.

=== Group A ===
Pos	Team	Pld	W	D	L	GF	GA	GD	Pts	Qualification
1	(Brazil) Flamengo	3	2	1	0	9	2	+7	7	Semi-finals
2	(Uruguay) Danubio	3	2	0	1	7	5	+2	6	Semi-finals
3	(Chile) O'Higgins	3	0	2	1	1	4	−3	2	
4	(Paraguay) Olimpia	3	0	1	2	4	10	−6	1	

Source: CONMEBOL
1 March 2025
19:00

Flamengo (Brazil)	6–1	(Paraguay) Olimpia
Daniel Sales 5'; Felipe Teresa 13'; Ogundana 52', 87'; Rayan Lucas 60'; Guilherme 64'	Report	Delmás 34'

Estadio Gunther Vogel, San Lorenzo
Referee: Sebastián Zunino (Argentina)
1 March 2025
19:00

O'Higgins (Chile)	0–3	(Uruguay) Danubio
	Report	Romero 24'; Roldán 33' (pen.); Díaz 39'

Estadio CARFEM, Ypané
Referee: Augusto Menéndez (Peru)

4 March 2025
19:00

Danubio (Uruguay)	1–3	(Brazil) Flamengo
Roldán 64'	Report	Felipe Teresa 49'; Iago Teodoro 72' (pen.); Da Mata 78'

Estadio CARFEM, Ypané
Referee: Javier Alberola Rojas (Spain)
4 March 2025
19:00

O'Higgins (Chile)	1–1	(Paraguay) Olimpia
Espinoza 10'	Report	Meza 70'

Estadio Gunther Vogel, San Lorenzo
Referee: Carlos Ortega (Colombia)

7 March 2025
19:00

Flamengo (Brazil)	0–0	(Chile) O'Higgins
	Report

Estadio CARFEM, Ypané
Referee: Alejandro Velásquez (Venezuela)
7 March 2025
19:00

Olimpia (Paraguay)	2–3	(Uruguay) Danubio
Zarza 22'; Candia 89'	Report	Romero 44', 50'; G. Rodríguez 81'

Estadio Gunther Vogel, San Lorenzo
Referee: Juan Carlos Andrade (Ecuador)

=== Group B ===
Pos	Team	Pld	W	D	L	GF	GA	GD	Pts	Qualification
1	(Argentina) Belgrano	3	2	1	0	6	1	+5	7	Semi-finals
2	(Peru) Universitario	3	2	0	1	4	2	+2	6	
3	(Colombia) Fortaleza	3	1	1	1	3	1	+2	4	
4	(Venezuela) Metropolitanos	3	0	0	3	1	10	−9	0	

Source: CONMEBOL
2 March 2025
19:00

Belgrano (Argentina)	2–0	(Peru) Universitario
Razzeto 45'; Oses 52'	Report

Estadio Gunther Vogel, San Lorenzo
Referee: Rafael Klein (Brazil)
2 March 2025
19:00

Metropolitanos (Venezuela)	0–3	(Colombia) Fortaleza
	Report	Medina 24'; Landázury 79'; Arrechea 81'

Estadio CARFEM, Ypané
Referee: Blas Romero (Paraguay)

5 March 2025
19:00

Fortaleza (Colombia)	0–0	(Argentina) Belgrano
	Report

Estadio CARFEM, Ypané
Referee: Javier Feres (Uruguay)
5 March 2025
19:00

Metropolitanos (Venezuela)	0–3	(Peru) Universitario
	Report	Pullchz 33'; Rengifo 83'; Osorio 90+4'

Estadio Gunther Vogel, San Lorenzo
Referee: Dilio Rodríguez (Bolivia)

8 March 2025
19:00

Belgrano (Argentina)	4–1	(Venezuela) Metropolitanos
Turletti 28'; Monzón 51', 62'; Fernández 71' (o.g.)	Report	Giménez 6'

Estadio Gunther Vogel, San Lorenzo
Referee: Blas Romero (Paraguay)
8 March 2025
19:00

Universitario (Peru)	1–0	(Colombia) Fortaleza
Díaz 54'	Report

Estadio CARFEM, Ypané
Referee: Rafael Klein (Brazil)

=== Group C ===
Pos	Team	Pld	W	D	L	GF	GA	GD	Pts	Qualification
1	(Brazil) Palmeiras	3	3	0	0	12	0	+12	9	Semi-finals
2	(Paraguay) Cerro Porteño	3	1	1	1	3	5	−2	4	
3	(Bolivia) Blooming	3	0	2	1	0	6	−6	2	
4	(Ecuador) Independiente del Valle	3	0	1	2	2	6	−4	1	

Source: CONMEBOL
3 March 2025
19:00

Palmeiras (Brazil)	6–0	(Bolivia) Blooming
Luighi 14' (pen.); Diogo Antônio 20'; Figueiredo 26'; Rafael Coutinho 39'; Riquelme Fillipi 71', 72'	Report

Estadio CARFEM, Ypané
Referee: Alejandro Velásquez (Venezuela)
3 March 2025
19:00

Independiente del Valle (Ecuador)	2–3	(Paraguay) Cerro Porteño
Ayoví 52'; H. Peralta 56'	Report	T. Marecos 4'; Ávalos 16'; J. González 25'

Estadio Gunther Vogel, San Lorenzo
Referee: Fernando Véjar (Chile)

6 March 2025
19:00

Cerro Porteño (Paraguay)	0–3	(Brazil) Palmeiras
	Report	Riquelme Fillipi 6', 78'; Erick Belé 13'

Estadio Gunther Vogel, San Lorenzo
Referee: Augusto Menéndez (Peru)
6 March 2025
19:00

Independiente del Valle (Ecuador)	0–0	(Bolivia) Blooming
	Report

Estadio CARFEM, Ypané
Referee: Sebastián Zunino (Argentina)

9 March 2025
19:00

Palmeiras (Brazil)	3–0	(Ecuador) Independiente del Valle
Sorriso 3', 81'; Heittor 39'	Report

Estadio Gunther Vogel, San Lorenzo
Referee: Carlos Ortega (Colombia)
9 March 2025
19:00

Blooming (Bolivia)	0–0	(Paraguay) Cerro Porteño
	Report

Estadio CARFEM, Ypané
Referee: Javier Alberola Rojas (Spain)

=== Ranking of group runners-up ===
Pos	Grp	Team	Pld	W	D	L	GF	GA	GD	Pts	Qualification
1	A	(Uruguay) Danubio	3	2	0	1	7	5	+2	6	Semi-finals
2	B	(Peru) Universitario	3	2	0	1	4	2	+2	6	
3	C	(Paraguay) Cerro Porteño	3	1	1	1	3	5	−2	4	

Source: CONMEBOL
Rules for classification: 1) Points; 2) Goal difference; 3) Goals scored; 4) Fewest red cards; 5) Fewest yellow cards; 6) Drawing of lots (Regulations Article 22).

== Final stage ==
The final stage will be played on a single-elimination basis and consists of the semi-finals, third place match and the final. If a match was tied at the end of regular playing time, the winner would be decided directly by a penalty shoot-out (no extra time will be played) (Regulations Article 24). The semi-final matchups will be:

- Semi-final 1 (SF1): Group A winner vs. Best runner-up
- Semi-final 2 (SF2): Group B winner vs. Group C winner

All match times were local, PYT (UTC−3), as listed by CONMEBOL.

=== Bracket ===
Semi-finals
13 March
(Brazil) Flamengo	1
(Uruguay) Danubio	0
13 March
(Argentina) Belgrano	0
(Brazil) Palmeiras	2

Final
16 March
(Brazil) Flamengo (p)	1 (3)
(Brazil) Palmeiras	1 (2)
Third place
16 March
(Uruguay) Danubio	1
(Argentina) Belgrano	5

=== Semi-finals ===
13 March 2025
19:00

Flamengo (Brazil)	1–0	(Uruguay) Danubio
Daniel Sales 22'	Report

Estadio Gunther Vogel, San Lorenzo
Referee: Blas Romero (Paraguay)

13 March 2025
19:00

Belgrano (Argentina)	0–2	(Brazil) Palmeiras
	Report	Larson 33'; Luighi 35'

Estadio Arsenio Erico, Asunción
Referee: Javier Alberola Rojas (Spain)

=== Third place match ===
16 March 2025
16:30

Danubio (Uruguay)	1–5	(Argentina) Belgrano
Pereira 31'	Report	Turletti 14'; Monzón 79', 90'; Mendieta 84', 90+4'

Estadio Gunther Vogel, San Lorenzo
Referee: Alejandro Velásquez (Venezuela)

=== Final ===
16 March 2025
20:00

Flamengo (Brazil)	1–1	(Brazil) Palmeiras
Felipe Lima 49'	Report	Lucas Furtado 57' (o.g.)
Penalties
Iago Teodoro (penalty missed); Fabiano Henrique (penalty missed); João Carbone (penalty scored); Daniel Sales (penalty scored); Guilherme Gomes (penalty scored)	3–2	(penalty missed) Agner; (penalty scored) Gilberto; (penalty missed) Larson; (penalty missed) Heittor; (penalty scored) Luighi

Estadio Arsenio Erico, Asunción
Referee: Carlos Ortega (Colombia)

== Statistics ==
=== Goalscorers ===
There were 63 goals scored in 22 matches, for an average of 2.86 goals per match.

4 goals

- (Argentina) Leandro Monzón (Belgrano)
- (Brazil) Riquelme Fillipi (Palmeiras)

3 goals

- (Uruguay) Luciano Romero (Danubio)

2 goals

- (Brazil) Luighi (Palmeiras)
- (Brazil) Felipe Teresa (Flamengo)
- (Argentina) Fabricio Mendieta (Belgrano)
- (Nigeria) Shola Ogundana (Flamengo)
- (Uruguay) Fabricio Roldán (Danubio)
- (Brazil) Daniel Sales (Flamengo)
- (Brazil) Sorriso (Palmeiras)
- (Argentina) Juan Turletti (Belgrano)

1 goal

- (Colombia) Emmanuel Arrechea (Fortaleza)
- (Paraguay) Ariel Ávalos (Cerro Porteño)
- (Ecuador) Michael Ayoví (Independiente del Valle)
- (Paraguay) Juan Candia (Olimpia)
- (Brazil) Da Mata (Flamengo)
- (Paraguay) Eduardo Delmás (Olimpia)
- (Peru) Junior Díaz (Universitario)
- (Uruguay) Lucas Díaz (Danubio)
- (Brazil) Diogo Antônio (Palmeiras)
- (Brazil) Erick Belé (Palmeiras)
- (Chile) Martín Espinoza (O'Higgins)
- (Brazil) Felipe Lima (Flamengo)
- (Brazil) Vitor Figueiredo (Palmeiras)
- (Venezuela) Javier Giménez (Metropolitanos)
- (Brazil) Guilherme Gomes (Flamengo)
- (Paraguay) Junior González (Cerro Porteño)
- (Brazil) Heittor (Palmeiras)
- (Brazil) Iago Teodoro (Flamengo)
- (Colombia) Luis Landázury (Fortaleza)
- (Brazil) Larson (Palmeiras)
- (Paraguay) Tobías Marecos (Cerro Porteño)
- (Colombia) Jeferson Medina (Fortaleza)
- (Paraguay) Alexander Meza (Olimpia)
- (Argentina) Máximo Oses (Belgrano)
- (Peru) Sebastián Osorio (Univesitario)
- (Ecuador) Hans Peralta (Independiente del Valle)
- (Uruguay) Bautista Pereira (Danubio)
- (Peru) Alex Pullchz (Univesitario)
- (Brazil) Rafael Coutinho (Palmeiras)
- (Brazil) Rayan Lucas (Flamengo)
- (Argentina) Francisco Razzeto (Belgrano)
- (Peru) Nicolás Rengifo (Univesitario)
- (Uruguay) Gonzalo Rodríguez (Danubio)
- (Paraguay) Pedro Zarza (Olimpia)

1 own goal

- (Venezuela) Inyelman Fernández (Metropolitanos, against Belgrano)
- (Brazil) Lucas Furtado (Flamengo, against Palmeiras)

=== Final ranking ===
As per statistical convention in football, matches decided in extra time were counted as wins and losses, while matches decided by penalty shoot-out were counted as draws.

Pos	Team	Pld	W	D	L	GF	GA	GD	Pts	Final result
1st place, gold medalist(s)	(Brazil) Flamengo	5	3	2	0	11	3	+8	11	Champions
2nd place, silver medalist(s)	(Brazil) Palmeiras	5	4	1	0	15	1	+14	13	Runners-up
3rd place, bronze medalist(s)	(Argentina) Belgrano	5	3	1	1	11	4	+7	10	Third place
4	(Uruguay) Danubio	5	2	0	3	8	11	−3	6	Fourth place
5	(Peru) Universitario	3	2	0	1	4	2	+2	6	Eliminated in Group stage
6	(Colombia) Fortaleza	3	1	1	1	3	1	+2	4	Eliminated in Group stage
7	(Paraguay) Cerro Porteño	3	1	1	1	3	5	−2	4	Eliminated in Group stage
8	(Chile) O'Higgins	3	0	2	1	1	4	−3	2	Eliminated in Group stage
9	(Bolivia) Blooming	3	0	2	1	0	6	−6	2	Eliminated in Group stage
10	(Ecuador) Independiente del Valle	3	0	1	2	2	6	−4	1	Eliminated in Group stage
11	(Paraguay) Olimpia	3	0	1	2	4	10	−6	1	Eliminated in Group stage
12	(Venezuela) Metropolitanos	3	0	0	3	1	10	−9	0	Eliminated in Group stage

Source: CONMEBOL
Rules for classification: For 5th to 12th place. 1) Points in group stage; 2) Goal difference; 3) Goals scored; 4) Fewest red cards received; 5) Fewest yellow cards received; 6) Drawing of lots (Regulations Article 25).
