= Reinaldo Sánchez =

Chilean businessman (1944–2026)

President of the ANFP
- In office 2001–2006
- Preceded by: Miguel Bauzá
- Succeeded by: Harold Mayne-Nicholls

Personal details
- Born: 17 October 1944 Viña del Mar, Chile
- Died: 24 September 2026 (aged 81) Valparaíso, Chile
- Children: Two
- Education: Pontifical Catholic University of Valparaíso (no degree)
- Occupation: Businessman

Reinaldo del Carmen Sánchez Olivares (17 October 1944 − 24 September 2026), better known as Reinaldo Sánchez and nicknamed in Chilean media as Don Choco, was a Chilean businessman and football administrator who served as president of the Asociación Nacional de Fútbol Profesional (ANFP) from 2001 to 2006, and as president of Santiago Wanderers from 1992 to 2001.

In August 2021, he returned to the presidency of Santiago Wanderers, a role which he held until his death in 2026.

== Life and career ==
Sánchez attended the Rubén Castro school in Viña del Mar. During his youth, Sánchez had a brief period in the Mechanics career at Pontifical Catholic University of Valparaíso, without a degree. After ceasing his studies, he invested in the minibus business, eventually owning a fleet of around 150 buses that served the Valparaíso region. Sánchez was president of the Cooperativa Expresos Viña and the Higher Transport Council of the Valparaíso Region, amassing great influence in Valparaíso as a union leader for bus drivers and bus owners.

In 1992, he became president of Santiago Wanderers, the oldest professional club in Chilean football having been a member of the club since 1976. Sánchez received the club fresh off relegation, with Wanderers having lost Primera División status in 1991, and would lead the club back to the first tier in 1996. Wanderers would be relegated once more in 1998 but would return to the Primera the following year. In 2001, Sánchez's last year in charge of the club, Wanderers would become Chilean champions for the third, and to date, last time in their history in a dark horse campaign. Sánchez would resign from Santiago Wanderers shortly after the championship victory, aiming for the ANFP presidency.

That same year, Sánchez ran for the ANFP presidency, being elected on 24 September, by 27 votes to 16 over Luis Alberto Simián. Sánchez formally took charge of the ANFP on 1 October 2001.

During Sánchez's leadership, the Chilean national team suffered from historically poor performances, beginning in 2002, after finishing bottom of the qualifiers for the first time in their history, in what was Chile's worst-ever result in qualifiers, only eventually matched by 2026, where they again finished bottom last.

Chile would again underperform in their next competition, finishing bottom of their group in the 2004 Copa America, failing to qualify after losing 2-1 in their final fixture against Costa Rica.

In 2006, Chile came close to qualification under manager Juvenal Olmos but after failing to defeat Ecuador in Santiago in the last fixture, Chile missed out on the 5th place play-off spot. Olmos was fired by Sánchez in April 2005, replaced with Nelson Acosta, the manager who had qualified Chile to the 1998 FIFA World Cup after a 16-year absence from the World Cup, yet Chile failed to reverse its poor results under Acosta.

Amongst Sánchez's achievements at the helm of the ANFP were the creation of the Canal del Fútbol (CDF) in 2003, providing televising for all Primera División matches regardless of which teams played, as well as media right income that served as the bulk of the clubs financing. In 2006, in one of his last acts as president, Chile was awarded the hosting rights of the 2008 FIFA U-20 Women's World Cup, which lead to great improvements to the Women's football in the country, and the improvement of football venues in the country. On 5 October 2006, Sánchez resigned from the ANFP, being succeeded by Harold Mayne-Nicholls, who'd oversee the revival of Chilean football after firing Acosta following the disastrous 2007 Copa America in Venezuela, and hiring Marcelo Bielsa, kickstarting Chile's Generación Dorada, the most successful Chilean side in history, leading to widespread praise for his administration and a poor look on Sánchez's era.

In 2007, in one of the worst financial and sporting crises in Santiago Wanderers history, Sánchez was expelled from the club after being signalled as being responsible for the debacle. Harold Mayne-Nicholls, accused Sánchez of having left a deficit of US$1.7 billion in the ANFP, an accusation that was denied by Sánchez, who defended his period at the helm, claiming to have paid all the debts he received from previous president Miguel Bauzá, citing that the debt was due to mismanaging during Bauzá's administration, not his.

Sánchez would stay outside the football world during the 2010s, barring media appearances, until he returned to the presidency of Santiago Wanderers in 2021, which saw the club's worst ever first half of a season, being relegated by the end of said season, and their last Primera División appearance to date. Under his leadership, Santiago Wanderers U20's side became the first Chilean club to win the U-20 Copa Libertadores, after defeating Flamengo in Sangolquí to clinch the continental title, which qualified Wanderers to face Real Madrid Juvenil at the Bernabéu for the Under-20 Intercontinental Cup, where they'd go on to lose 3-1 in Madrid. Sánchez could not attend the final in Spain due to undisclosed health reasons. He died in Valparaíso on 24 September 2026, at the age of 81.
