= Christian Silva =

Christian Silva may refer to:

- Christian Silva (soccer, born 1989), American soccer defensive midfielder
- Christian Silva (footballer, born 2008), Chilean football forward for Santiago Wanderers
