= Paulo Victor Gomes =

Brazilian football manager (born 1988)

Personal information
- Full name: Paulo Victor Rodrigues Gomes
- Date of birth: 1 July 1988 (age 38)
- Place of birth: Barra Bonita, Brazil
- Position: Defensive midfielder

Team information
- Current team: Brazil U20 (head coach)

Youth career
- Years: Team
- XV de Jaú

Managerial career
- 2013: Novorizontino U15 (assistant)
- 2014: Novorizontino U20 (assistant)
- 2015: Palmeiras U16
- 2016–2017: Palmeiras U15
- 2017–2020: Brazil U15
- 2020–2021: Brazil U17
- 2021: Brazil Olympic (assistant)
- 2021–2023: Palmeiras U20
- 2021: Palmeiras (interim)
- 2023–2026: Club América (assistant)
- 2026–: Brazil U20

Paulo Victor Rodrigues Gomes (born 1 July 1988), known as Paulo Victor Gomes, Paulo Victor or just PV, is a Brazilian football coach. He is the current head coach of the Brazil national under-20 team.

== Career ==
Born in Barra Bonita, São Paulo, Paulo Victor opted to retire at the age of 18, when he was playing for the under-20 side of XV de Jaú. He began his managerial career in a school in his hometown, before joining Novorizontino in 2013, to work in the club's youth categories.

In 2015, Paulo Victor moved to Palmeiras, being in charge of the under-16 side for six months before taking over the under-15s. On 4 August 2017, he was named manager of the Brazil national under-15 team.

On 4 September 2020, Paulo Victor was appointed in charge of the Brazil national under-17 team, and was also an assistant of André Jardine in the Olympic team during the 2020 Summer Olympics. On 20 October 2021, he returned to Palmeiras after being named manager of the under-20s.

In December 2021, after Abel Ferreira and the first team were on vacation, Paulo Victor was named in charge of the main squad for the last two matches of the 2021 Série A. He achieved one draw against Athletico Paranaense, and one win over Ceará, before returning to his previous role.

Back to the under-20s for the 2022 season, Paulo Victor led the side to their first-ever Copa São Paulo de Futebol Júnior title. After also winning the Campeonato Brasileiro Sub-20 and the Copa do Brasil Sub-20 later in the year, he again won the Copinha in 2023.

On 17 June 2023, Paulo Victor accepted the invitation to become Jardine's assistant at Liga MX side Club América, ending his time in the youth team at Palmeiras. On 4 March 2026, he agreed to become the head coach of the Brazil national under-20 team, staying at América until the end of the Clausura tournament.

== Honours ==
Brazil U15

- South American U-15 Championship: 2019

Palmeiras U20

- Campeonato Paulista Sub-20: 2021
- Copa São Paulo de Futebol Júnior: 2022, 2023
- Campeonato Brasileiro Sub-20: 2022
- Copa do Brasil Sub-20: 2022
