= SC Corinthians Paulista (youth) =

Brazilian football academy

Corinthians
- Full name: Sport Club Corinthians Paulista (Academy)
- Nickname: Timãozinho (The Little Great Team)
- Ground: Estádio Parque São Jorge
- Capacity: 13,969
- League: Campeonato Brasileiro Sub-20 (Under-20s); Campeonato Brasileiro Sub-17 (Under-17s)
- 2020: Under-23s: 7th Under-20s: 3rd Under-17s: 5th
| Home colours | Away colours | Third colours |

Sport Club Corinthians Paulista's Base Categories (Portuguese: Categorias de Base do Sport Club Corinthians Paulista) is the youth system of Corinthians. The youth system is composed of several age categories ranging from Under-11s to Under-20s. The academy teams play in the state-wide Federação Paulista de Futebol-organized competitions (U-11 to U-20), the Brazilian Football Confederation-organized national championships (U-17 to U-20), and in the prestigious Copa São Paulo de Futebol Júnior (U-20).

Corinthians' academy is one of Brazil's most successful, winning 11 Copa São Paulo de Futebol Júnior, 1 Campeonato Brasileiro Sub-20 and 1 Copa do Brasil Sub-17 titles altogether. Numerous international players have graduated from the academy team.

== Competitions ==
| Under-20s (Junior) | Copa São Paulo de Futebol Júnior; Campeonato Brasileiro Sub-20; Copa do Brasil Sub-20; Campeonato Paulista Sub-20 |
| Under-17s (Juvenil) | Campeonato Brasileiro Sub-17; Copa do Brasil Sub-17; Campeonato Paulista Sub-17 |
| Under-15s (Infantil) | Campeonato Paulista Sub-15 |
| Under-13s | Campeonato Paulista Sub-13 |
| Under-11s | Campeonato Paulista Sub-11 |

== Players ==
As of 22 August 2024

Note: Shirt numbers refer to first-team matches. Academy matches numbers are issued on a match-by-match basis.

=== Under-23s ===
Note: Corinthians deactivated the under-23s squad in 2022. Occasionally some under-23s players might remain under contract and are available for some competitions.

=== Under-20s ===
As of 11 August 2026

Note: Players currently eligible to play in the under-20 squad
Note: Flags indicate national team as defined under FIFA eligibility rules; some limited exceptions apply. Players may hold more than one non-FIFA nationality.

| No. | Pos. | Nation | Player |
|---|---|---|---|
| — | GK | BRA | Matheus Corrêa |
| — | GK | BRA | Nicollas Siqueira |
| — | GK | BRA | Pietro |
| — | DF | BRA | Joãozinho |
| — | DF | BRA | Lucca Vaz |
| — | DF | BRA | Jacaré |
| — | DF | BRA | Kaio Vinicius |
| — | DF | BRA | Pellegrin |
| — | DF | BRA | Cauã Ribeiro |
| — | DF | BRA | Iago Machado |
| — | DF | BRA | Levy Dias |
| — | DF | BRA | Lorenzo |
| — | DF | BRA | Pedro Paulo |
| — | DF | BRA | Yago Cândido |
| — | DF | BRA | Yago Melo |
| — | MF | BRA | Bahia |
| — | MF | BRA | Caraguá |
| — | MF | BRA | Pedro Thomas |
| — | MF | BRA | Teixeirão |
| — | MF | BRA | Vitinho Dourado |

| No. | Pos. | Nation | Player |
|---|---|---|---|
| — | DF | BRA | Caipira |
| — | MF | BRA | Yago |
| — | MF | BRA | Christian |
| — | MF | BRA | Gui Amorim |
| — | MF | BRA | Guilherme Pires |
| — | MF | BRA | Heitor |
| — | MF | BRA | Jonathan Domingos |
| — | MF | BRA | Lucas Molina |
| — | MF | BRA | Wilker |
| — | FW | BRA | Cristian Jr |
| — | FW | BRA | Dante |
| — | FW | BRA | Drude |
| — | FW | BRA | Felipe Romio |
| — | FW | BRA | Gui Bom |
| — | FW | BRA | Gustavo Correa |
| — | FW | BRA | Léo Agostinho |
| — | FW | BRA | Luiz Fernando |
| — | FW | BRA | Nicolas Araújo |
| — | FW | BRA | Nícollas |
| — | FW | BRA | Rodrigão |

=== Under-17s ===
As of 9 May 2026

Note: Only players with a professional contract
Note: Flags indicate national team as defined under FIFA eligibility rules; some limited exceptions apply. Players may hold more than one non-FIFA nationality.

| No. | Pos. | Nation | Player |
|---|---|---|---|
| — | GK | BRA | Gustavo Milani |
| — | GK | BRA | Matheus Alemão |
| — | GK | BRA | Rafael Alencar |
| — | DF | BRA | Pedro Nogueira |
| — | DF | BRA | Rafael Luiz |
| — | DF | BRA | Brenno Augusto |
| — | DF | BRA | Wendel Silva |
| — | DF | BRA | Cauã Souza |
| — | DF | BRA | Kevin Fernando |
| — | DF | BRA | Matheus Ferraz |
| — | DF | BRA | Felipe Aguirra |
| — | DF | BRA | Keirrison |
| — | DF | BRA | Nathan William |
| — | DF | BRA | Ronaldo |
| — | DF | BRA | Ygor Lessa |
| — | DF | BRA | Estevão Balarin |
| — | MF | BRA | Darllyson |
| — | MF | BRA | Lucas Lopes |
| — | MF | BRA | Lucas Splichal |

| No. | Pos. | Nation | Player |
|---|---|---|---|
| — | MF | BRA | Ji-Paraná |
| — | MF | BRA | Piracicaba |
| — | MF | BRA | Léo Rodrigues |
| — | MF | BRA | Lucca Caramico |
| — | MF | BRA | Rafael Guarnieri |
| — | FW | BRA | Gabriel Cordeiro |
| — | FW | BRA | Gustavo Sales |
| — | FW | BRA | Kawê |
| — | FW | BRA | Tupã |
| — | FW | BRA | Léo Amistá |
| — | FW | BRA | Luan Banhado |
| — | FW | BRA | Matheus Rocha |
| — | FW | BRA | Miguel Moscardo |
| — | FW | BRA | Thiago Coelho |
| — | FW | BRA | Igor Macedo |
| — | FW | BRA | Jerry Vinicius |
| — | FW | BRA | Miller Henrique |
| — | FW | BRA | Rhyan Queiroz |

== Staff ==
As of 9 May 2026

| General Director | Erasmo Damiani |
| Technical Coordinator | Ricardo Drubscky |
| Under-20s Staff | Head coach: William Batista |
| Under-17s Staff | Head coach: Guilherme Nascimento Meireles |

== Academy Graduates ==
— Academy graduates who still play for Corinthians, including those that are currently out on loan to other clubs, are in bold.

=== Notable Graduates ===
| Player | Debut Year | Information |
|---|---|---|
| (Brazil) Jaú | 1932 | Played for Brazil in the 1938 FIFA World Cup |
| (Brazil) Britto | 1933 | Played for Brazil in the 1938 FIFA World Cup |
| (Brazil) Cabeção | 1949 | Played for Brazil in the 1954 FIFA World Cup |
| (Brazil) Rivellino | 1965 | Played for Brazil in 3 FIFA World Cups (1970, 1974 and 1978) |
| (Brazil) Walter Casagrande | 1982 | Played for Brazil in the 1986 FIFA World Cup |
| (Brazil) Paulo Sérgio | 1988 | Played for Brazil in the 1994 FIFA World Cup |
| (Brazil) Viola | 1988 | Played for Brazil in the 1994 FIFA World Cup |
| (Brazil) Cris | 1995 | Played for Brazil in the 2006 FIFA World Cup |
| (Portugal) Deco | 1996 | Played for Portugal in 2 FIFA World Cups (2006 and 2010) |
| (Brazil) Jô | 2003 | Played for Brazil in the 2014 FIFA World Cup |
| (Brazil) Willian | 2006 | Played for Brazil in 2 FIFA World Cups (2014 and 2018) |
| (Brazil) Weverton | 2007 | Played for Brazil in the 2022 FIFA World Cup, gold medalist in the 2016 Summer Olympics |
| (Brazil) Éverton Ribeiro | 2007 | Played for Brazil in the 2022 FIFA World Cup |
| (Brazil) Marquinhos | 2011 | Played for Brazil in 2 FIFA World Cups (2018, 2022), gold medalist in the 2016 Summer Olympics |
| (Brazil) **Fagner** | 2006 | Played for Brazil in the 2018 FIFA World Cup |
| (Brazil) Malcom | 2014 | Gold medalist for Brazil in the 2020 Summer Olympics |
| (Brazil) Guilherme Arana | 2014 | Gold medalist for Brazil in the 2020 Summer Olympics |
| (Brazil) Claudinho | 2016 | Gold medalist for Brazil in the 2020 Summer Olympics |

=== Graduates (2011-present) ===
| Player | Debut | Current club / most recent club |
|---|---|---|
| (Brazil) Elias Oliveira | Age 19 v Cruzeiro, 24 July 2011 | (Thailand) Pattaya Dolphins United |
| (Brazil) Danilo Fernandes | Age 23 v Athletico-PR, 7 August 2011 | (Brazil) Bahia |
| (Brazil) André Vinícius | Age 20 v Grêmio Osasco, 15 September 2011 | (Brazil) Oeste (2018) [retired] |
| (Brazil) Antonio Carlos | Age 18 v Grêmio Osasco, 15 September 2011 | (United States) Orlando City |
| (Brazil) Denner | Age 17 v Grêmio Osasco, 15 September 2011 | (Brazil) Operário Várzea-Grandense |
| (Brazil) Douglas Santos | Age 19 v Grêmio Osasco, 15 September 2011 | (Brazil) CSE |
| (Brazil) Igor Fernandes | Age 19 v Grêmio Osasco, 15 September 2011 | (Brazil) Santo André |
| (Brazil) Marquinhos | Age 17 v Grêmio Osasco, 15 September 2011 | (France) Paris Saint-Germain |
| (Brazil) Matheus Souza | Age 18 v Grêmio Osasco, 15 September 2011 | (Malta) Balzan |
| (Brazil) Moisés Ribeiro | Age 20 v Grêmio Osasco, 15 September 2011 | (Brazil) Santo André |
| (Brazil) Gomes | Age 18 v São Caetano, 18 February 2012 | (Brazil) Boa Esporte (2022) |
| (Brazil) Willian Arão | Age 19 v Flamengo, 15 January 2012 | (Turkey) Fenerbahçe |
| (Brazil) Giovanni | Age 18 v Ponte Preta, 15 April 2012 | (Brazil) Cruzeiro (2022) |
| (Brazil) Matheuzinho | Age 19 v Ponte Preta, 15 April 2012 | (Sudan) Al-Merrikh |
| (Brazil) Léo Arthur | Age 17 v Paulista-SP, 20 January 2013 | (Brazil) Figueirense |
| (Brazil) Yago | Age 20 v Ituano, 9 March 2013 | (Brazil) Náutico (2021) [retired] |
| (Brazil) Paulinho | Age 19 v Linense, 14 April 2013 | (South Korea) Chungbuk Cheongju |
| (Brazil) Zé Paulo | Age 19 v Bragantino, 5 February 2014 | (Vietnam) Hồng Lĩnh Hà Tĩnh |
| (Brazil) Malcom | Age 17 v Bahia de Feira, 19 March 2014 | (Russia) Zenit Saint Petersburg |
| (Brazil) Guilherme Arana | Age 16 v Athletico-PR, 14 May 2014 | (Brazil) Atlético Mineiro |
| (Brazil) Gustavo Tocantins | Age 19 v Botafogo, 11 October 2014 | (Indonesia) Barito Putera |
| (Brazil) Pedro Henrique | Age 19 v 1. FC Köln, 15 January 2015 | (Brazil) Athletico Paranaense |
| (Brazil) Marciel | Age 20 v Figueirense, 27 June 2015 | (Brazil) Caxias |
| (Brazil) Léo Jabá | Age 16 v ABC, 22 July 2015 | (Brazil) São Bernardo |
| (Brazil) Matheus Vidotto | Age 22 v ABC, 22 July 2015 | (Japan) Tokyo Verdy |
| (Brazil) Matheus Pereira | Age 17 v ABC, 22 July 2015 | (Spain) Eibar |
| (Brazil) Samuel | Age 17 v ABC, 22 July 2015 | (Brazil) PSTC (2020) [retired] |
| (Brazil) **Maycon** | Age 18 v Capivariano, 11 February 2016 | (Brazil) **Corinthians** (on loan) |
| (Brazil) Claudinho | Age 19 v Linense, 19 March 2016 | (Russia) Zenit Saint Petersburg |
| (Brazil) Caíque França | Age 21 v Botafogo, 19 June 2016 | (Brazil) Ponte Preta |
| (Brazil) Léo Príncipe | Age 19 v Figueirense, 23 July 2016 | (Slovenia) ND Primorje |
| (Brazil) **Léo Santos** | Age 17 v Figueirense, 16 November 2016 | (Brazil) Ferroviária (on loan) |
| (Brazil) Pedrinho | Age 18 v Ferroviária, 19 March 2017 | (Brazil) Atlético Mineiro |
| (Brazil) Carlinhos | Age 20 v Atlético Goianiense, 26 August 2017 | (Brazil) Audax Rio de Janeiro |
| (Brazil) Rodrigo Figueiredo | Age 21 v Flamengo, 19 November 2017 | (Tanzania) Singida United |
| (Brazil) Guilherme Mantuan | Age 20 v Sport, 3 December 2017 | (Brazil) Botafogo-SP |
| (Brazil) Guilherme Romão | Age 20 v PSV Eindhoven, 10 January 2018 (Note: Guilherme Romão made his professional debut while loaned out to Oeste in 2017) | (Brazil) CRB (2022) |
| (Brazil) Carlos Augusto | Age 19 v Grêmio, 8 July 2018 | (Italy) Monza |
| (Brazil) Rafael Bilú | Age 19 v Chapecoense, 25 November 2018 | (Brazil) Cruzeiro |
| (Brazil) Marquinhos | Age 21 v Santos, 13 January 2019 (Note: Marquinhos made his professional debut while loaned out to Bangu in 2018) | (Cyprus) APOEL |
| (Brazil) Fabrício Oya | Age 19 v Ituano, 20 March 2019 | (Brazil) Azuriz |
| (Brazil) Lucas Belezi | Age 16 v Botafogo-SP, 29 June 2019 (Note: Lucas Belezi became the youngest player ever to feature in a Corinthians match (aged 16 years, 1 month, 21 days)) | (Brazil) Corinthians (2022) |
| (Brazil) **Matheus Araújo** | Age 17 v Botafogo-SP, 29 June 2019 | (Brazil) **Corinthians** |
| (Brazil) João Victor | Age 20 v Botafogo-SP, 29 June 2019 | (Portugal) Benfica |
| (Brazil) Daniel Marcos | Age 18 v Vila Nova-GO, 4 July 2019 | (Brazil) Corinthians (2022) |
| (Brazil) João Celeri | Age 20 v Vila Nova-GO, 4 July 2019 | (Brazil) Grêmio Anápolis |
| (Brazil) Igor Morais | Age 21 v Londrina, 7 July 2019 | (Brazil) Cianorte |
| (Brazil) Lucas Piton | Age 19 v Fluminense, 8 December 2019 | (Brazil) Vasco da Gama |
| (Brazil) Gabriel Pereira | Age 19 v Atlético Mineiro, 12 August 2020 | (United States) New York City |
| (Brazil) **Roni** | Age 21 v Bahia, 16 September 2020 | (Brazil) **Corinthians** |
| (Brazil) **Gustavo Mantuan** | Age 19 v Sport, 23 September 2020 | (Russia) Zenit Saint Petersburg (on loan) |
| (Brazil) **Raul Gustavo** | Age 21 v Bahia, 29 January 2021 | (Brazil) Bahia (on loan) |
| (Brazil) **Rodrigo Varanda** | Age 18 v Bragantino, 28 February 2021 | (Cyprus) **Corinthians** |
| (Brazil) **Matheus Donelli** | Age 18 v Palmeiras, 3 March 2021 | (Brazil) **Corinthians** |
| (Brazil) **Adson** | Age 20 v Ponte Preta, 7 March 2021 | (Brazil) **Corinthians** |
| (Brazil) Vitinho | Age 21 v São Caetano, 14 March 2021 | (Portugal) Arouca |
| (Brazil) **Luis Mandaca** | Age 19 v Novorizontino, 9 May 2021 | (Brazil) Juventude (on loan) |
| (Brazil) **Felipe Augusto** | Age 17 v Novorizontino, 9 May 2021 | (Brazil) **Corinthians** |
| (Brazil) **Du Queiroz** | Age 21 v Athletico Paranaense, 22 Aug 2021 | (Brazil) **Corinthians** |
| (Brazil) Robert Renan | Age 18 v Portuguesa-RJ, 20 Apr 2022 | (Russia) Zenit Saint Petersburg |
| (Brazil) **Wesley** | Age 17 v Portuguesa-RJ, 20 Apr 2022 | (Brazil) **Corinthians** |
| (Brazil) **Guilherme Biro** | Age 18 v Fluminense, 2 Jul 2022 | (Brazil) **Corinthians** |
| (Brazil) **Arthur Souza** | Age 19 v Cuiabá, 1 Oct 2022 | (Brazil) **Corinthians** |

== Honours ==
=== International ===
- Dallas Cup Supergroup U-19
  - Winners (2): 1999, 2000
- Mundial de Clubes de La Comunidad de Madrid Sub-17
  - Winners (3): 2010, 2011, 2015
- Manchester United Premier Cup U-15
  - Winners (1): 2003
- L'Alcúdia International Football Tournament U-20
  - Winners (1): 1999
- Milk Cup U-14
  - Winners (1): 2014
- Canon Lion City Cup U-15
  - Winners (1): 2013
- Mina Cup U-15
  - Winners (1): 2025

=== National ===
- Campeonato Brasileiro Sub-17
  - Winners (1): 2026
- Copa do Brasil Sub-17
  - Winners (1): 2016
- Copa Votorantim Sub-15
  - Winners (3): 2003, 2004, 2022

=== Inter-state ===
- Copa São Paulo de Futebol Júnior
  - Winners (11): 1969, 1970, 1995, 1999, 2004, 2005, 2009, 2012, 2015, 2017, 2024
- Taça Belo Horizonte de Juniores
  - Winners (1): 2015
- Copa Rio Grande do Sul de Futebol Sub-20
  - Winners (1): 2014
- Copa Rio Sub-17
  - Winners (1): 1987

=== State ===
- Campeonato Paulista Série B3
  - Winners (1): 2001
- Campeonato Paulista Sub-20
  - Winners (9): 1957, 1959, 1967, 1971, 1972, 1974, 1997, 2014, 2015
- Campeonato Paulista Sub-17
  - Winners (4): 2002, 2005, 2007, 2013
- Campeonato Paulista Sub-15
  - Winners (4): 2005, 2006, 2010, 2013
- Campeonato Paulista Sub-13
  - Winners (4): 2011, 2012, 2013, 2017
- Campeonato Paulista Sub-11
  - Winners (2): 2014, 2022

=== Others ===
- Copa da Amizade Brasil-Japão
  - Winners (1): 2002

== See also ==
- SC Corinthians Paulista
