= 2025 U-20 Copa Libertadores final =

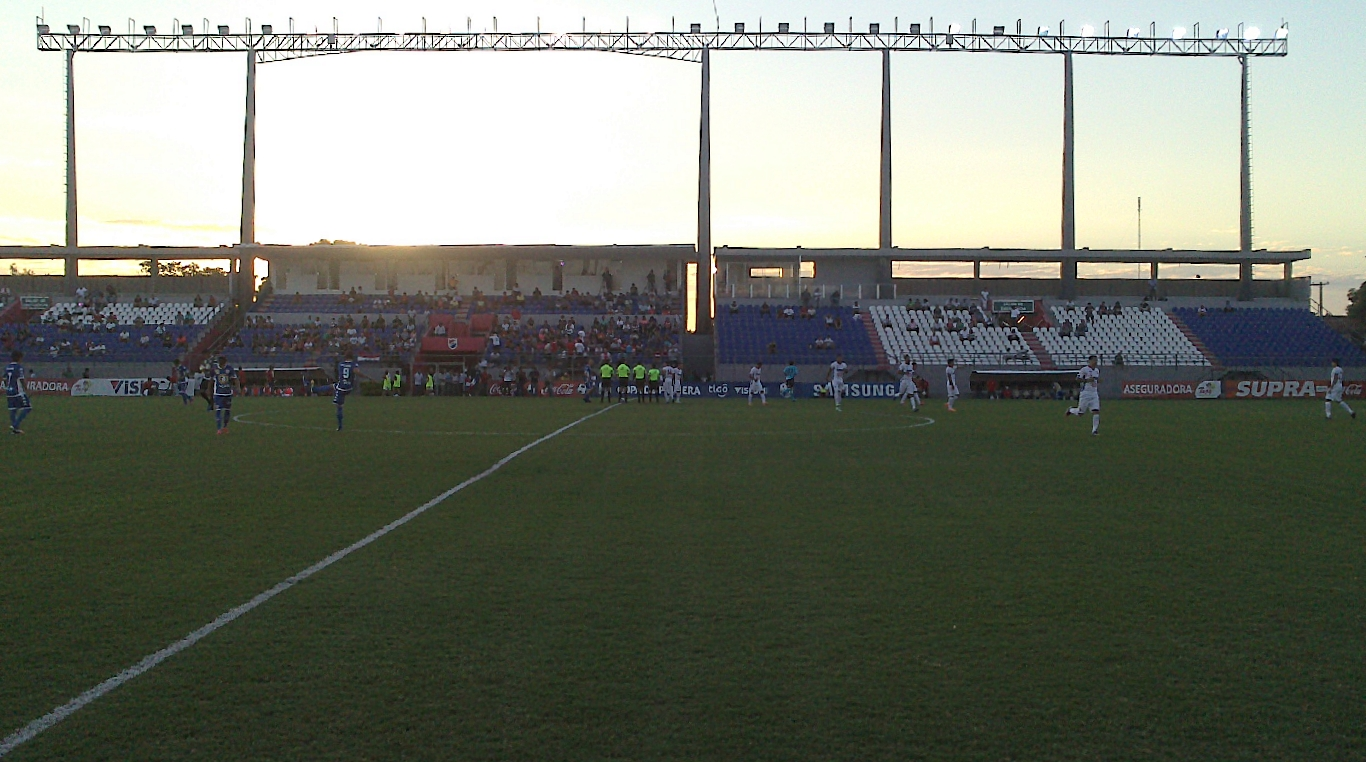
- Arsenio Erico stadium, venue
- Event: 2025 U-20 Copa Libertadores
Flamengo	Palmeiras
(Brazil)	(Brazil)
- Date: 16 March 2025
- Venue: Estadio Arsenio Erico, Asunción, Paraguay
- Referee: Carlos Ortega (Colombia)

The 2025 U-20 Copa Libertadores final (Spanish: La final de la Copa Libertadores Sub-20 de 2025, Brazilian Portuguese: Final da Copa Libertadores Sub-20 de 2025) is the final of the 9th edition of the U-20 Copa Libertadores, an under age football competition organised by CONMEBOL. It will be contested by Brazilian sides Flamengo (title holder) and Palmeiras, and hosted by Estadio Arsenio Erico in the capital Paraguayan city of Asunción.

== Teams ==
Team	Previous final app.
(Brazil) Flamengo	**2024**
(Brazil) Palmeiras	(none)

- **Bold** indicates winning years

== Road to the final ==
Flamengo		Round	Palmeiras	
Opponent	Result	Stage	Opponent	Result
(Paraguay) Olimpia	6-1	Matchday 1	(Bolivia) Blooming	6-0
(Uruguay) Danubio	3-1	Matchday 2	(Paraguay) Cerro Porteño	3-0
(Chile) O'Higgins	0-0	Matchday 3	(Ecuador) Independiente del Valle	3-0
(Uruguay) Danubio	1-0	Semifinals	(Argentina) Belgrano	2–1
