= Luighi =

Brazilian footballer (born 2006)

- Luighi with New York City FC in 2026

Personal information
- Full name: Luighi Hanri Sousa Santos
- Date of birth: 30 April 2006 (age 20)
- Place of birth: São Paulo, Brazil
- Height: 1.82 m (6 ft 0 in)
- Position: Forward

Team information
- Current team: New York City FC (on loan from Palmeiras)
- Number: 20

Youth career
- 2016–2024: Palmeiras

Senior career*
Years	Team	Apps	(Gls)
2024–	Palmeiras	45	(5)
2026–	→ New York City FC (loan)	7	(4)

International career
2023	Brazil U17	5	(2)
2025	Brazil U20	4	(2)
- * Club domestic league appearances and goals as of 12 September 2026

Luighi Hanri Sousa Santos (born 30 April 2006), simply known as Luighi, is a Brazilian professional footballer who plays as a forward for New York City FC, on loan from Palmeiras.

== Career ==
=== Palmeiras ===
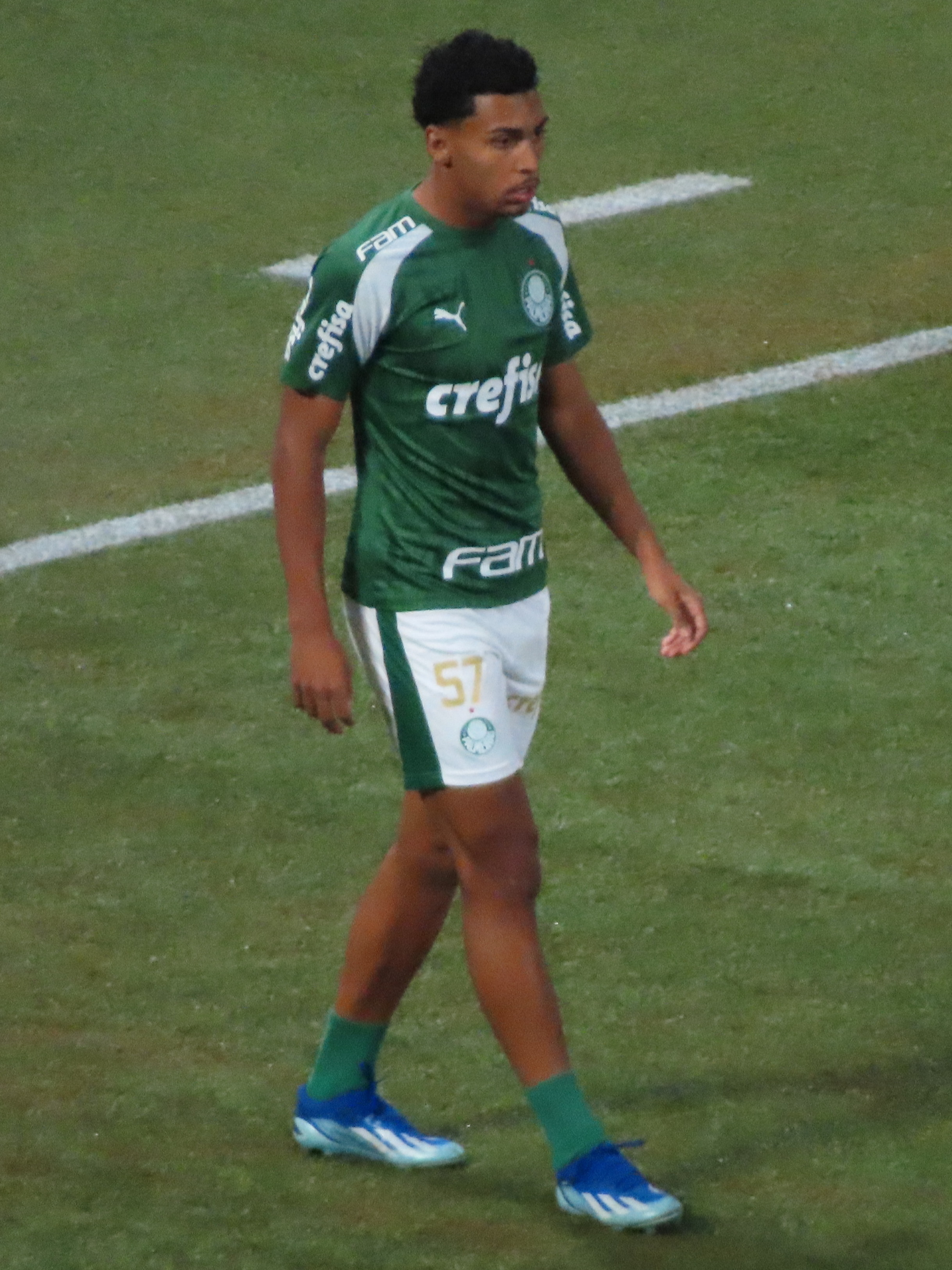
Luighi with Palmeiras in 2024

At Palmeiras since he was 10 years old, Luighi was appointed by the press as one of the players of the so-called "Palmeiras' Generation of a Billion", alongside Endrick, Estevão Willian and Luis Guilherme. Representing Brazil, he participated in the 2023 FIFA U-17 World Cup, making 5 appearances and scoring 2 goals.

On 26 June 2024, Luighi was promoted by coach Abel Ferreira definitively to the professional team of Palmeiras. He made his professional debut on 7 July 2024, in a match against Bahia.

On 6 March 2025, Luighi was racially abused by Cerro Porteño a fan while playing in a match between Palmeiras and Cerro Porteño for the U-20 Copa Libertadores in Paraguay. He said afterwards that "it hurts the soul". In September 2025, Luighi was part of the squad that competed in 2025 FIFA U-20 World Cup.

==== Loan to New York City FC ====
On 28 July 2026, it was announced that Luighi had joined MLS club New York City FC on loan through the remainder of the 2026 season, with an option to buy. He had a very successful start, scoring four goals in eight matches.

== Honours ==
Palmeiras U20

- Campeonato Brasileiro Sub-20: 2024, 2025
- Campeonato Paulista Sub-20: 2023

Palmeiras U17

- Campeonato Brasileiro Sub-17: 2022, 2023
- Copa do Brasil Sub-17: 2022, 2023
- Campeonato Paulista Sub-17: 2022

Palmeiras

- Campeonato Paulista: 2026
