= Lucas Avendaño =

Chilean footballer (born 2006)

Personal information
- Full name: Lucas Jesús Avendaño Pizarro
- Date of birth: 7 February 2006 (age 20)
- Place of birth: , Chile
- Height: 1.76 m (5 ft 9 1/2 in)
- Position: Midfielder

Team information
- Current team: Santiago Wanderers
- Number: 20

Youth career
- Santiago Wanderers

Senior career*
| Years | Team | Apps | (Gls) |
| 2024– | Santiago Wanderers | 17 | (0) |
- * Club domestic league appearances and goals as of 20 September 2026

Lucas Jesús Avendaño Pizarro (born 7 February 2006) is a Chilean football player who currently plays for Santiago Wanderers.

He helped to Wanderers in obtaining the 2026 U-20 Copa Libertadores title.

== Club career ==
Avendaño made his professional debut on 27 April 2024 in a Copa Chile match against Juan Fernández Islands team. Since then, he has been part of the club's first-team squad in the Primera B de Chile (second-tier).

In 2025, he was part of the club's under-20 squad that won the Primera División de Chile Youth Tournament.

In March 2026, Avendaño captained Wanderers in the U-20 Copa Libertadores, playing as a central midfielder. He scored against Uruguayan club Nacional in the group stage and featured in the final stages against Palmeiras and Flamengo, as the team went on to win the title. Later, he took part in the 3–1 loss against Real Madrid in the 2026 U20 Intercontinental Cup.

== Honours ==
Santiago Wanderers U20

- U-20 Copa Libertadores (1): 2026
