= Erick Belé =

Brazilian footballer

Personal information
- Full name: Erick Machado Belé
- Date of birth: 21 January 2007 (age 19)
- Place of birth: Flores da Cunha, Brazil
- Height: 1.83 m (6 ft 0 in)
- Position: Attacking midfielder

Team information
- Current team: Palmeiras
- Number: 45

Youth career
- Juventude
- 2018–: Palmeiras

Senior career*
Years	Team	Apps	(Gls)
2025–	Palmeiras	1	(0)

International career^{‡}
2025–	Brazil U20	5	(1)
- * Club domestic league appearances and goals as of 17:27, 21 October 2025 (UTC) ‡ National team caps and goals as of 17:27, 21 October 2025 (UTC)

Erick Machado Belé (born 21 January 2007) is a Brazilian professional footballer who plays as a midfielder for Palmeiras.

== Club career ==
Belé was born in Flores da Cunha, Rio Grande do Sul, and joined Palmeiras' youth sides in 2018, after impressing at Juventude. On 21 March 2023, he signed his first professional contract with the club, agreeing to a deal until 2026.

On 8 July 2025, Belé further extended his link with Verdão until 2028. He made his first team – and Série A – debut on 11 October, coming on as a late substitute for Raphael Veiga in a 4–1 home routing of his former club Juventude.

== International career ==
Belé represented Brazil at under-20 level, making his debut for the side in July 2025. On 18 September, he and another three Palmeiras teammates were called up for the 2025 FIFA U-20 World Cup.

== Career statistics ==
As of 21 October 2025

Appearances and goals by club, season and competition
Club	Season	League			Paulista		Copa do Brasil		Continental		Other		Total	
Club	Season	Division	Apps	Goals	Apps	Goals	Apps	Goals	Apps	Goals	Apps	Goals	Apps	Goals
Palmeiras	2025	Série A	1	0	0	0	0	0	0	0	—		1	0
Career total			1	0	0	0	0	0	0	0	0	0	1	0

== Honours ==
Palmeiras U17

- Campeonato Brasileiro Sub-17: 2023
- Copa do Brasil Sub-17: 2023

Palmeiras U20

- Campeonato Brasileiro Sub-20: 2025
- Campeonato Paulista Sub-20: 2023
