= Roberta Hanley =

American actress and film director

Roberta Hanley is a screenwriter and director, she directed the 1998 movie Brand New World, for which she was awarded the Grand Jury Prize for Best Feature Film at the 2001 New York International Independent Film & Video Festival.

== Films ==
- 2005: The Nickel Children as The Waitress
- 2003: I Love Your Work as Katie's Korner Host
- 2003: This Girl's Life as Bored Beverly Hills Housewife
- 1999: The Virgin Suicides as Mrs. Weiner
- 1998: I Woke Up Early the Day I Died as a Housewife
- 1998: Modern Vampires (TV Movie) as Saleslady
- 1997: This World, Then the Fireworks as Younger Mom Lakewood
- 1996: Red Ribbon Blues as Savemore Pharmacist
- 1996: Trees Lounge as Roberta
- 1996: Freeway as Teacher
- 1995: Delta of Venus (film) as Opium Den Proprietor
- 1995: Savage Hearts as Lady Owner
