= Copa Votorantim Sub-15 =

Copa Votorantim Sub-15 Copa Brasil de Futebol Infantil
- Founded: 1991
- Country: Brazil
- Current champions: Corinthians (4th title) (2025)
- Most championships: São Paulo (6 titles)
- Website: Website

The Copa Votorantim Sub-15, is the oldest and most traditional Brazilian football competition in the under-15 category. It has been organized by the municipality of Votorantim since 1991.

== List of champions ==
Following there are all the championship editions:

Year	Champion	Runners-up
1991	São Paulo; SP	Bahia; BA
1992	São Paulo; SP	Corinthians; SP
1993–1997	Not held	
1998	Juventus; SP	São Paulo; SP
1999	Juventus; SP	Flamengo; RJ
2000	Vitória; BA	Grêmio; RS
2001	Juventus; SP	Cruzeiro; MG
2002	Cruzeiro; MG	Corinthians; SP
2003	Corinthians; SP	Votorantim XI; SP
2004	Corinthians; SP	Internacional; RS
2005	Cruzeiro; MG	Corinthians; SP
2006	Cruzeiro; MG	Internacional; RS
2007	Atlético Paranaense; PR	Cruzeiro; MG
2008	Grêmio; RS	São Paulo; SP
2009	Internacional; RS	Fluminense; RJ
2010	Grêmio; RS	Palmeiras; SP
2011	Internacional; RS	Fluminense; RJ
2012	Coritiba; PR	Grêmio; RS
2013	São Paulo; SP	Bahia; BA
2014	São Paulo; SP	Corinthians; SP
2015	Flamengo; RJ	Grêmio; RS
2016	São Paulo; SP	Coritiba; PR
2017	Flamengo; RJ	Palmeiras; SP
2018	Palmeiras; SP	Flamengo; RJ
2019	Avaí; SC	Internacional; RS
2020	Avaí; SC	Red Bull Brasil; SP
2021	Not held due COVID-19 pandemic	
2022	Corinthians; SP	Santos; SP
2023	Santos; SP	Palmeiras; SP
2024	São Paulo; SP	Palmeiras; SP
2025	Corinthians; SP	Votorantim XI; SP
2026	Cancelled	

=== Titles by club ===
Club	Champions	Runners-up
São Paulo	6	2
Corinthians	4	4
Cruzeiro	3	2
Juventus	3	0
Grêmio	2	3
Internacional	2	3
Flamengo	2	2
Avaí	2	0
Palmeiras	1	4
Coritiba	1	1
Santos	1	1
Atlético Paranaense	1	0
Vitória	1	0
Bahia	0	2
Fluminense	0	2
Votorantim XI	0	2
Red Bull Brasil	0	1
