= David Oduro =

Ghanaian professional footballer

Personal information
- Date of birth: 12 June 2006 (age 20)
- Place of birth: Accra, Ghana
- Height: 1.74 m (5 ft 9 in)
- Position: Left-back

Team information
- Current team: Annecy
- Number: 32

Youth career
- Desideros FC
- 2021–2022: Accra Lions
- 2024–2025: Barcelona

Senior career*
| Years | Team | Apps | (Gls) |
| 2022–2024 | Accra Lions | 50 | (1) |
| 2024–2026 | Barcelona B | 33 | (1) |
| 2026– | Annecy | 0 | (0) |

International career^{‡}
| 2023 | Ghana U20 | 5 | (0) |
| 2026– | Ghana | 1 | (0) |
- * Club domestic league appearances and goals as of 4 September 2026 ‡ National team caps and goals as of 22 May 2026

David Oduro (born 12 June 2006) is a Ghanaian professional footballer who plays as a left-back for Ligue 2 club Annecy and the Ghana national team.

== Club career ==
=== Accra Lions ===
Born in Accra, Ghana, Oduro joined the youth setup of Accra Lions from Desideros Football Academy in 2021. On 20 November 2022, he made his senior debut for the club in the Ghana Premier League against King Faisal. He came off the bench in a 2–1 away defeat.

=== Barcelona ===
On 30 August 2024, FC Barcelona announced the signing of Oduro on a three-year contract, becoming the first Ghanaian to sign with the Spanish giants. He was assigned to the reserves in the third-tier. The following 6 November, he made his debut against Real Sociedad B in the Primera Federación, replacing Alexis Olmedo at half-time for a 1–1 draw.

== Honours ==
Barcelona

- UEFA Youth League: 2024–25
