= Marcos Parriego =

Spanish footballer (born 2006)

Personal information
- Full name: Marcos Parriego Vega
- Date of birth: 4 January 2006 (age 20)
- Place of birth: Soto del Real, Spain
- Height: 1.76 m (5 ft 9 in)
- Position: Midfielder

Team information
- Current team: Valladolid B
- Number: 22

Youth career
- Recreativo Soto del Real
- 2016–2018: Real Madrid
- 2018–2019: Rayo Vallecano
- 2019–2020: Leganés
- 2020–2024: Rayo Vallecano
- 2024–2025: Barcelona

Senior career*
Years	Team	Apps	(Gls)
2025–2026	Barcelona B	1	(0)
2026	Atlético Madrid B	0	(0)
2026–	Valladolid B	4	(0)
2026–	Valladolid	1	(0)
- * Club domestic league appearances and goals as of 25 October 2026

Marcos Parriego Vega (born 4 January 2006) is a Spanish footballer who plays as a midfielder for Real Valladolid Promesas.

== Career ==
Born in Soto del Real, Community of Madrid, Parriego began his career with hometown side Recreativo Soto del Real CF before joining Real Madrid's La Fábrica in 2016, aged ten. After leaving the side in 2018, he subsequently moved to Rayo Vallecano, and spent five of the following six seasons at the club (aside from a year at CD Leganés).

In March 2024, it was reported that Parriego had agreed to a move to FC Barcelona, for their Juvenil team; the move was officially announced on 10 August. He was promoted to the reserves in July 2025, but several injuries prevented him from playing, and he only made his senior debut on 11 January 2026, in a 4–1 Segunda Federación away loss to Reus FC Reddis.

On 20 January 2026, Parriego terminated his link with Barça, and signed an 18-month deal with another reserve team, Atlético Madrid B, nine days later. On 18 July, after making no appearances for the latter, he agreed to a two-year contract with Real Valladolid, being initially a member of the B-team.

Parriego made his professional debut with the Pucela on 15 August 2026, coming on as a late substitute for Julien Ponceau in a 2–0 Segunda División away loss to RCD Mallorca.
