= Brand New World =

1998 British film by Roberta Hanley

Brand New World Woundings
- Directed by: Roberta Hanley
- Written by: Roberta Hanley; Jeff Noon
- Based on: Woundings by Jeff Noon
- Produced by: Chris Hanley; Bradford L. Schlei; Dan Sales (EP); Jordan Gertner (EP)
- Starring: Julie Cox; Sammi Davis; Emily Lloyd; Guy Pearce; Twiggy
- Cinematography: Alun Bollinger
- Edited by: Andrew Marcus
- Music by: Wendy Carlos
- Production companies: Cinequanon; Isle of Man Film Commission; Muse Productions; Stone Canyon Entertainment
- Distributed by: UAV Entertainment (US)
- Release date: 1998
- Country: United Kingdom
- Language: English

Brand New World, also called Woundings, a UK film based on Jeff Noon's play Woundings and released in 1998. It was filmed in Cregneash, Isle of Man.

The director Roberta Hanley won the Grand Jury Prize for Best Feature Film at the 2001 New York International Independent Film and Video Festival for the film.

== Home media ==
Flashback Entertainment released a transfer of the film (titled "Woundings") in Australia on DVD, both as an individual (Cat. 10193) and as a three-film package "Thriller" (Cat. 7360) with Taxman and Terminal Error.
