= Harold Mayne-Nicholls =

Chilean journalist and football administrator

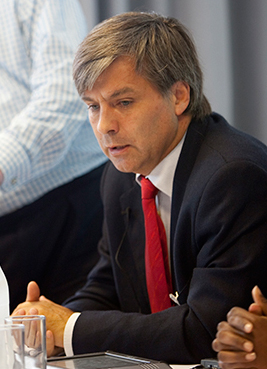

President of the ANFP
- In office 2007–2010
- Preceded by: Reinaldo Sánchez
- Succeeded by: Sergio Jadue

Personal details
- Born: Harold Mayne-Nicholls Secul; 27 June 1961 (age 65) Antofagasta, Chile
- Occupation: Journalist, administrator
- Known for: Former president of ANFP, FIFA official

Harold Alfred Mayne-Nicholls Secul (born 27 July 1961) is a Chilean journalist and former football administrator who was president of the National Professional Football Association (ANFP) and of the Chilean Football Federation (FFCh). He was also a FIFA official. On 6 July 2015, he was banned for seven years by FIFA Ethics Committee from all football-related activity, after being the chair of evaluation for the 2018 and 2022 World Cup and openly criticizing the decision to hold the 2022 World Cup in Qatar. On 2 March 2017, he appealed the ban to the Court of Arbitration for Sport, which finally decided that there was no real misconduct and lifted the sentence. He stood as an independent candidate in the 2025 Chilean presidential election, achieving 1.26% of the vote.

== Background ==
Mayne-Nicholls was born in Antofagasta in 1961, the son of a Chilean father of English descent from Iquique and a descendant of Croatians from Punta Arenas. He is of Cornish and Croatian descent. He is married to the journalist Eugenia Fernández Ibarra, with whom he has five children.

He studied at the Colegio Yugoslavo, San José de Antofagasta English School and at Saint George's College, in Vitacura, Santiago. In the mid-1980s he studied journalism at the Pontifical Catholic University of Chile, and was selected as a soccer player from the PUC. During his studies he was nominated for the student center of his career, presiding over the independent list, which he lost against Esteban Valenzuela. In 1988 he obtained his postgraduate degree in business administration from the Adolfo Ibáñez University.

He is a recognized fan of Antofagasta Sports Club, of which he has been a member since 1973.

== Sports management career ==
After graduating, he dedicated himself to sports journalism and photography, which he already did in his student days. He worked for various media outlets in his country, such as La Nación, El Mercurio and La Tercera newspapers and Triunfo and Minuto 90 sports magazines.

In 1986 he joined Asicom in the Public Relations area. In 1987 he went on to work as a public relations and communications officer for Epson Chile, a position he held until 1989. In 1991 he worked as a press officer for the Copa América, held that year in Chile.

At the beginning of March 2011, he created the Ganamos Todos Foundation, dedicated to promote sports and physical activity. From August to December 2011, he completed an internship in the Sports Department of the University of Notre Dame, South Bend, Indiana, United States.

From January 2012 to September 2015, he was a sports consultant for the DirecTV cable television network. Among other activities he developed the EuroAmerican Cup, in 2013, 2014 and 2015. He is a professor at the Faculty of Engineering of the Catholic University of Chile, where he has taught the courses History of the World Cup and Management in Sports.

=== Career in FIFA ===
In 1993, he joined FIFA as press officer of the World Cup held the following year in the United States, specifically at the Boston headquarters. He subsequently served as press officer of the 1995 Football World Cup Under-17 held in Ecuador, general coordinator of football at the 1996 Atlanta Olympics and the 1996 Futsal World Cup, national team manager of the Chilean Football Federation (FFCh) - charge he gave up in 1996 after the dismissal of Xabier Azkargorta as coach of the Chile national team— and press officer at the Bordeaux headquarters of the 1998 FIFA World Cup.

He was then named general coordinator of the 1999 U-20 Soccer World Cup, the 1999 Confederations Cup, the 2000 Club World Cup, the Brisbane venue at the 2000 Sydney Olympics, the Crete venue at the Athens Olympics 2004, of the Confederations Cup 2001, of the Seoul headquarters of the Soccer World Cup 2002, of the 2005 Beach Soccer World Cup, of the Frankfurt headquarters of the 2005 Confederations Cup, of the 2005 U-17 Soccer World Cup, from the Munich headquarters at the 2006 Soccer World Cup and the Gold Cup (years 2011 and 2013).

He took over the FIFA Goal program for a decade. He was a member of the inspection group for the 2010 World Cup. He was also a permanent contributor to the FIFA-CIES Master program.

In May 2012, he resigned from FIFA, being his last function in the latter, inspecting the nominations for the 2018 and 2022 World Cups and had been designated by the Federation as football commissioner at the London Olympics 2012 for the Cardiff headquarters, Wales.

=== ANFP ===
Parallel to his work at FIFA, in 2007 he assumed as president of the Chilean Football Federation and the National Association of Professional Football (ANFP). In his period the senior team qualified for the 2010 Football World Cup held in South Africa, by the hand of Argentine coach Marcelo Bielsa, hired by Mayne-Nicholls.

In 2008 and 2009 he was distinguished by the Circle of Sports Journalists of Chile as the "Best [Sports] Manager" in the country He sought a new period in the ANFP in the election held in November 2010, but was defeated by Jorge Segovia, Spanish businessman and president of the Unión Española. A day before the elections, Marcelo Bielsa said he would not continue in the direction of the football team if Segovia won the election. The election was challenged by the board headed by Mayne-Nicholls, preventing Segovia from taking office. A new election was made, in which Mayne-Nicholls did not run for office; Sergio Jadue was elected, and Segovia was appointed as vice president. This led to the resignation of Marcelo Bielsa on February 4, 2011.

=== Return to sports management ===
In the year 2019, he joined the board of Blanco y Negro - managing administrator of Colo-Colo - with the position of executive vice president as representative of the Aníbal Mosa bloc, who led the voting at the shareholders meeting that year.

== Ganamos Todos NGO ==
After his departure from the ANFP, the year 2011, Harold Mayne-Nicholls founded Fundación Ganamos Todos in order to bring sports and physical activity to all corners of Chile. Today, Harold, together with Ganamos Todos, has been present in more than 230 communes in the country, having trained 8,905 adults and carried out activities for 196,917 children.

== Political career ==
Mayne-Nicholls was an independent candidate to President of Chile in the 2025 Chilean general election. He captured 163,273 votes, representing 1,26% of the total.

== Books ==
- El caso Rojas, un engaño mundial (1990), coautor con Marco Antonio Cumsille
- Historias sudamericanas en la Copa del Mundo (2006)
- Su majestad la encuesta y otros cuentos (2009)
- Rincones bajo los 3 palos (2015), libro de fotografías.
