= João Carbone =

Brazilian footballer (born 2005)

Personal information
- Full name: João Victor Schlickmann Carbone
- Date of birth: 29 January 2005 (age 21)
- Place of birth: Rio de Janeiro, Brazil
- Height: 1.88 m (6 ft 2 in)
- Position: Defender

Team information
- Current team: Lugano
- Number: 44

Youth career
- Grêmio
- 2021–2025: Flamengo

Senior career*
Years	Team	Apps	(Gls)
2026	Flamengo	1	(0)
2026–	Lugano	9	(0)
- * Club domestic league appearances and goals as of 11:09, 22 November 2026 (UTC)

João Victor Schlickmann Carbone (born 29 January 2005) is a Brazilian professional footballer who plays as a centre-back or left-back for Swiss Super League club Lugano.

He spent most of his youth career at Flamengo, winning the U-20 Copa Libertadores and Under-20 Intercontinental Cup in 2024 and 2025, but was sent off after ten minutes in his only first-team appearance for the club.

== Career ==
=== Flamengo ===
Born in Rio de Janeiro, Carbone was a youth player at Grêmio, where he won the state championship four consecutive times, before joining Flamengo in April 2021. In his first year, he won the Copa do Brasil Sub-17, and was made captain.

In January 2024, Carbone was one of four youths to travel with the first team for pre-season in the United States. He extended his contract from an end date of May 2025 to December 2026. He was part of the team that were champions of the U-20 Copa Libertadores in 2024 and 2025, scoring in the penalty shootout win over compatriots Palmeiras in the latter. His side also won the Under-20 Intercontinental Cup in both years, and he scored the decisive attempt in the shootout against Barcelona in 2025 in the Maracanã Stadium.

At the start of 2026, Carbone turned 21 and became ineligible for Flamengo's youth teams. His only first-team appearance was on 18 January in a home Campeonato Carioca game against Volta Redonda, and he was sent off after ten minutes for two yellow cards. He was then out of the plans of manager Filipe Luís.

=== Lugano ===
On 11 February 2026, Carbone rescinded his Flamengo contract in its last year and joined Swiss Super League club Lugano on a deal until June 2029. His previous employer maintained a share of a future transfer.

== Personal life ==
Carbone is the son of former Fluminense player Rodrigo Carbone, and grandson of former Internacional player and Fluminense manager José Luiz Carbone. His grandfather's uncle Rodolfo Carbone played for Corinthians. His mother and paternal aunt were professional volleyball players.
