= José Luiz Carbone =

Brazilian footballer and coach (1946–2020)

Personal information
- Full name: José Luiz Carbone
- Date of birth: 22 March 1946
- Place of birth: São Paulo, Brazil
- Date of death: 27 December 2020 (aged 74)
- Place of death: Campinas, Brazil
- Position: Defensive midfielder

Senior career*
Years	Team	Apps	(Gls)
1963–1967	São Paulo		
1966	→ Ponte Preta (loan)		
1968	Metropol		
1969–1973	Internacional		
1973–1978	Botafogo	52	(1)
1978–1981	Nacional (SP)		

International career
1973–1974	Brazil	6	(0)

Managerial career
- Fluminense
- Guarani
- * Club domestic league appearances and goals

José Luiz Carbone (22 March 1946 – 27 December 2020) was a Brazilian football player and coach.

== Career ==
Born in São Paulo, Carbone played as a defensive midfielder for São Paulo, Ponte Preta, Metropol, Internacional, Botafogo and Nacional (SP). He won the Campeonato Gaúcho in each of his five years at Internacional, from 1969 to 1973. With the Brazil national team, he was part of a 25-man preliminary squad for the 1974 FIFA World Cup in West Germany, but was omitted from the final squad by manager Mário Zagallo.

Carbone managed 37 clubs, starting with Nacional (SP) in 1982. With Fluminense, he won the Campeonato Carioca in 1983 and led the team for most of their Campeonato Brasileiro Série A triumph in 1984 before being replaced by Carlos Alberto Parreira; he returned in 1987 and 1997–98. He had four spells in charge of Guarani, where he was runner-up in the Campeonato Paulista in 1988.

In 1996, Carbone was appointed as manager of Sporting Cristal in Peru, but was replaced by Sergio Markarián before the club won the league title. He won the Campeonato Paraense with Remo in 1999, and was briefly manager of Ararat Tehran in Iran in 2006. His last club, from 2009–10, was Al Merrikh in Sudan. On 7 March 2010, his player Endurance Idahor suffered a heart attack, and the club's fans began to throw stones, believing that he had been assaulted by the opposition fans; Carbone credited his players with quelling the situation.

== Personal life and death ==
Carbone was married twice and had five children. His son Rodrigo Carbone played for Fluminense, and his grandson João Carbone was a youth player for Flamengo. His uncle Rodolfo Carbone played for Corinthians.

Carbone died of liver cancer in hospital in Campinas on 27 December 2020.
