= Dan Sales =

American film producer

Daniel Lewis Sales (1958–2005), usually credited as Dan Sales, was an American film producer. He created Cinequanon Pictures, a film production and film distribution company, which produced films such as I Woke up Early the Day I Died (1999), starring Billy Zane.

== Early life and career ==
Dan Sales was born on June 23, 1958 in West Palm Beach, Florida and later graduated from Brown University in Providence, Rhode Island with honors. After graduation, he moved to New York City and worked various jobs, ranging from being a taxi driver to working in the stock market, as he pursued his goal of working in the entertainment industry. From there, he had produced the independent film, “The Way It Is,” (1984), which debuted at the Toronto International Film Festival with critical acclaim and with Steve Buscemi, Vincent Gallo, and Rockets Redglare as cast members.

He later moved to Los Angeles in 1986. In 1993, he created Cinequanon Pictures International, Incorporated, which would go on to own the distribution rights to 100s of films. He had worked with German director Uwe Bol and his production company Boll KG.

He died on May 27, 2005. His obituary recommended that donations be made to the Epilepsy Foundation of Greater Los Angeles or the Epilepsy Foundation of South Florida, Inc., in lieu of flowers.

== Filmography ==
He was the associate, executive or supervising producer for movies such as:

- Skinner (1993),
- Brand New World (1998),
- Dilemma (1997) with Sofia Shinas, C. Thomas Howell, and Danny Trejo,
- Stranded (2001),
- Alone in the Dark (2005)
- and BloodRayne (2005)
