= Agner (footballer) =

Brazilian association football player (born 2005)

Personal information
- Full name: Agner Moura Izigethy de Souza
- Date of birth: 25 March 2005 (age 21)
- Position: Attacking midfielder

Team information
- Current team: Fluminense FC

Youth career
- 2016-: Fluminense FC

Senior career*
Years	Team	Apps	(Gls)
2024-	Fluminense	2	(0)
- * Club domestic league appearances and goals as of 00:15 (UTC) 26 May 2026

Agner Moura Izigethy de Souza (born 22 March 2005) is a Brazilian footballer who plays as an attacking midfielder for Fluminense FC.

== Career ==
He joined Fluminense FC in 2016 when he was 11 years-old. In 2023, he scored on his debut in the Copa São Paulo de Futebol Júnior for Fluminese U20. He signed a first pro contract with the club in 2021, and in May 2023 had the opportunity to train with the senior Brazil national team. In July 2023, at the age of 18 years-old he signed a new three-year professional contract with the club. He was included in the Fluminense first team squad for the 2023 Taça Guanabara.

On 3 January 2024 he made his debut for Fluminense in the Campeonato Carioca against São Raimundo Esporte Clube (RR), scoring in a 3-0 win. With Fluminense having to field youthful a side at the start of the tournament due to their participation in the FIFA Club World Cup in December 2023 draining the first-team regulars, Agner was singled out for praise for his performances.

He continued with the Fluminense U20 side when the 2024 league season started and scored a goal in each of their opening three games.
