= Christian Silva (footballer, born 2008) =

Chilean footballer (born 2008)

Personal information
- Full name: Christian Alexis Silva Martínez
- Date of birth: 19 February 2008 (age 18)
- Place of birth: Casablanca, Chile
- Height: 1.76 m (5 ft 9 1/2 in)
- Position: Forward

Team information
- Current team: Santiago Wanderers
- Number: 29

Youth career
- Santiago Wanderers

Senior career*
Years	Team	Apps	(Gls)
2025–	Santiago Wanderers	5	(0)
- * Club domestic league appearances and goals ‡ National team caps and goals as of 17:57, 13 August 2026 (UTC)

Christian Alexis Silva Martínez (born 19 February 2008) is a Chilean football player who currently plays for Santiago Wanderers.

He was a key player in Wanderers' 2026 U-20 Copa Libertadores title, finishing as the tournament goalscorer.

== Football career ==
Silva began his career at youth level in the Valparaíso Region before joining Santiago Wanderers, where he progressed through the club's youth system.

In 2025, he signed his first professional contract with Wanderers and later made his senior debut in domestic competition ―Primera B―, while continuing to feature at youth level.

In March 2026, Silva was part of the Santiago Wanderers squad that competed in the 2026 U-20 Copa Libertadores, where the club won the tournament. He scored four goals, including a brace against Brazilian side Palmeiras, finishing as the top goalscorer of the tournament. Later, he scored a goal in the 3–1 loss against Real Madrid in the 2026 U20 Intercontinental Cup.

== Honours ==
Santiago Wanderers U20

- U-20 Copa Libertadores (1): 2026
