= Copa Rio Grande do Sul de Futebol Sub-20 =

- Founded: 2006
- Region: Brazil
- Teams: 20
- Current champions: Grêmio (3rd title)
- Most championships: Cruzeiro, Grêmio, São Paulo (3 titles)
- Broadcaster: SporTV

The Copa Rio Grande do Sul de Futebol Sub-20 (or Rio Grande do Sul Under-20 Football Cup, in English) is a cup competition played by Brazilian under-20 football teams.

== List of champions ==
Copa Rio Grande do Sul de Futebol Sub-20 winners
Final	Winner	Score	Runner-up
2006	Internacional	4–0	Grêmio
2007	Cruzeiro	1–0	Internacional
2008	Grêmio	2–1	Sport
2009	Grêmio	1–0	Atlético Mineiro
2010	Cruzeiro	0–0 (4–2 p)	Palmeiras
2011	América Mineiro	2–1	Fluminense
2012	Cruzeiro	2–1	Internacional
2013	Internacional	2–0	Palmeiras
2014	Corinthians	1–0	Atlético Paranaense
2015	São Paulo	3–1	Atlético Mineiro
2016	São Paulo	2–2 (5–3 p)	Botafogo
2017	São Paulo	4–3	Palmeiras
2018	Palmeiras	1–1 (4–3 p)	São Paulo
2019	Grêmio	1–0	Vasco da Gama

== Titles by team ==
Club	Titles	Years won
(Minas Gerais) Cruzeiro	3	2007, 2010, 2012
(Rio Grande do Sul) Grêmio	3	2008, 2009, 2019
(São Paulo (state)) São Paulo	3	2015, 2016, 2017
(Rio Grande do Sul) Internacional	2	2006, 2013
(Minas Gerais) América Mineiro	1	2011
(São Paulo (state)) Corinthians	1	2014
(São Paulo (state)) Palmeiras	1	2018

== Titles by state ==
State	Titles
Rio Grande do Sul	5
São Paulo	5
Minas Gerais	4
