= Rayo Vallecano (youth) =

Rayo Vallecano Juvenil A
- Full name: Rayo Vallecano de Madrid Juvenil A
- Nickname: Rayo Juvenil
- Ground: Ciudad Deportiva, Madrid, Madrid, Spain
- Capacity: 1,000
- President: Raúl Martín Presa
- League: División de Honor Juvenil de Fútbol
Home colours

The Rayo Vallecano Juvenil are the under-19 team of Spanish club Rayo Vallecano. They play in the Group V of the División de Honor Juvenil de Fútbol.

== Organization ==
Squad	League
Senior Teams
Rayo B	Tercera Federación (Gr. 7) (Tier 5)
Rayo C	1ª Aficionados (Tier 8)
Rayo D	2ª Aficonados (Tier 9)
Youth Teams	
Juvenil A	División de Honor (Gr. 5)
Juvenil B	Liga Nacional (Gr. 12)
Juvenil C	Primera División Autonómica
Cadete A	Superliga
Cadete B	División de Honor
Infantil A	Superliga
Infantil B	División de Honor
Alevín A	Superliga
Alevín B	División de Honor Fútbol-7
Benjamín A	Primera División Autonómica
Benjamín B	Primera División Autonómica

== See also ==
- Fundación Rayo Vallecano
