= João Victor (footballer, born January 2007) =

Brazilian footballer (born 2007)

Personal information
- Full name: João Victor de Souza Cunha
- Date of birth: 1 January 2007 (age 19)
- Place of birth: Rio de Janeiro, Brasil
- Height: 1.87 m (6 ft 2 in)
- Position: Centre-back

Team information
- Current team: Flamengo
- Number: 61

Youth career
- 2018–: Flamengo

Senior career*
Years	Team	Apps	(Gls)
2024–	Flamengo	10	(0)

International career
2023	Brazil U17	2	(1)
2024–	Brazil U20	1	(0)
- * Club domestic league appearances and goals as of 7 April 2026

João Victor de Souza Cunha (born 1 January 2007), known as João Victor, is a Brazilian professional footballer who plays as a centre-back for Campeonato Brasileiro Série A club Flamengo.

== Club career ==
Born in Rio de Janeiro, João Victor joined Flamengo's youth sides in 2018, aged 11. In 2024, he helped the under-20 side to win both the 2024 U-20 Copa Libertadores and the 2024 Under-20 Intercontinental Cup.

On 9 September 2024, João Victor renewed his contract with Fla until December 2029. He made his professional – and Série A – debut on 4 December, coming on as a late substitute for Bruno Henrique in a 3–0 away win over Criciúma.

== International career ==
In October 2023, João Victor was called up to the Brazil national under-17 team for the 2023 FIFA U-17 World Cup.

== Career statistics ==
As of 5 December 2024

Club	Season	League			State League		Cup		Continental		Other		Total	
Club	Season	Division	Apps	Goals	Apps	Goals	Apps	Goals	Apps	Goals	Apps	Goals	Apps	Goals
Flamengo	2024	Série A	1	0	0	0	0	0	0	0	—		1	0
Career total			1	0	0	0	0	0	0	0	0	0	1	0

== Honours ==
Flamengo U20

- Under-20 Intercontinental Cup: 2024, 2025
- U-20 Copa Libertadores: 2024

Flamengo

- Copa Libertadores: 2025
- Campeonato Brasileiro Série A: 2025
- Campeonato Carioca: 2025
