= Daniel Sales (footballer) =

Brazilian footballer (born 2006)

Personal information
- Full name: Daniel dos Santos Sales
- Date of birth: 23 June 2006 (age 20)
- Place of birth: Jaciara, Brasil
- Height: 1.73 m (5 ft 8 in)
- Position: Right-back

Team information
- Current team: Flamengo
- Number: 51

Youth career
- 2021: Cruzeiro-RS
- 2022: Ibrachina
- 2022–: Flamengo

Senior career*
Years	Team	Apps	(Gls)
2024–	Flamengo	7	(0)
- * Club domestic league appearances and goals as of 13:37, 24 October 2024 (UTC)

Daniel dos Santos Sales (born 23 June 2006), known as Daniel Sales, is a Brazilian professional footballer who plays as a right-back for Flamengo.

== Club career ==
Born in Jaciara, Mato Grosso, Daniel Sales joined Flamengo's youth sides in 2022, from Ibrachina, and signed his first professional contract with the former in December of that year. In 2024, he helped the under-20 side to win the year's Under-20 Intercontinental Cup.

Daniel Sales made his first team – and Série A – debut on 22 September 2024, coming on as a late substitute for fellow youth graduate Wesley França in a 3–2 away loss to Grêmio, as head coach Tite opted to line up several reserve players.

== International career ==
In January 2023, Daniel Sales was called up to the Brazil national under-17 team for a period of trainings.

== Career statistics ==
As of 24 October 2024

Club	Season	League			State League		Cup		Continental		Other		Total	
Club	Season	Division	Apps	Goals	Apps	Goals	Apps	Goals	Apps	Goals	Apps	Goals	Apps	Goals
Flamengo	2024	Série A	1	0	0	0	0	0	0	0	—		1	0
Career total			1	0	0	0	0	0	0	0	0	0	1	0

== Honours ==
Flamengo U20

- Under-20 Intercontinental Cup: 2024, 2025
- U-20 Copa Libertadores: 2025

Flamengo

- Copa Libertadores: 2025
- Campeonato Brasileiro Série A: 2025
- Campeonato Carioca: 2025
