= Heittor =

Brazilian footballer (born 2007)

Personal information
- Full name: Heittor Vinicius da Silva Nunes
- Date of birth: 18 September 2007 (age 19)
- Place of birth: Recife, Brazil
- Height: 1.77 m (5 ft 10 in)
- Position: Forward

Team information
- Current team: Palmeiras
- Number: 39

Youth career
- Palmeiras

Senior career*
Years	Team	Apps	(Gls)
2025–	Palmeiras	1	(0)

International career^{‡}
2026–	Brazil U20	2	(0)
- * Club domestic league appearances and goals ‡ National team caps and goals as of 31 March 2026

Heittor Vinicius da Silva Nunes (born 18 September 2007) is a Brazilian professional footballer who plays as a forward for Palmeiras.

== Early life ==
Heittor was born on 18 September 2007. Born in Recife, Brazil, he is a native of the city.

== Club career ==
As a youth player, Heittor joined the youth academy of Palmeiras at the age of eleven. During the 2025 season, he helped the club's under-20 team win the league title.

Heittor made his first team debut in a Série A match against Coritiba on 22 July 2026. He came on as a late substitute for Ramón Sosa in a 3-1 away win.

== International career ==
Heittor is a Brazil youth international. On 28 March 2026, he debuted for the Brazil national under-20 football team during a 3–1 home friendly win over the Paraguay national under-20 football team.
