= Faustino Barone =

Footballer (born 2006)

Personal information
- Full name: Deivis Faustino Barone Mora
- Date of birth: 11 May 2006 (age 20)
- Place of birth: Asunción, Paraguay
- Height: 1.90 m (6 ft 3 in)
- Position: Forward

Team information
- Current team: Olimpia
- Number: 26

Youth career
- Huracán de San Ramón
- River Plate Montevideo

Senior career*
Years	Team	Apps	(Gls)
2023–	River Plate Montevideo	55	(9)
2023–	Olimpia	3	(0)

International career
2022–2023	Uruguay U17	16	(5)
2024	Uruguay U20	4	(1)
- * Club domestic league appearances and goals as of 13 August 2025

Deivis Faustino Barone Mora (born 11 May 2006) is a professional footballer who plays as a forward for Paraguayan Primera División club Olimpia. Born in Paraguay, he represents Uruguay at youth international level.

== Early life ==
Barone was born in Asunción, Paraguay, to former Uruguayan footballer Deivis Barone, who was playing for Paraguayan side Club Libertad at the time. His sister, Fátima Barone, has gone on to become an international footballer for Uruguay.

== Club career ==
After his family returned to Uruguay, he lived in San Ramón in the Canelones Department, and began his footballing career as a defender for local side Huracán de San Ramón. After joining the academy of professional side River Plate Montevideo, he transitioned to become a centre-forward.

Having made his professional debut for River Plate on 19 February 2023, when he came on as a second-half substitute for Pablo Nicolás López de León in a 0–0 Uruguayan Primera División draw with Racing, Barone would have to wait until an injury crisis at the club in June 2023 to feature again. In his third game for the club, he was named as a starter for the away match against Peñarol. With the score at 1–1, Barone scored from close range following a cross from the left wing provided by Joaquín Lavega. The same two players combined again for River Plate's third goal in their eventual 3–1 win, with Barone scoring from a similar position.

== Career statistics ==
=== Club ===
As of 14 July 2023

Appearances and goals by club, season and competition
Club	Season	League			Cup		Continental		Other		Total	
Club	Season	Division	Apps	Goals	Apps	Goals	Apps	Goals	Apps	Goals	Apps	Goals
River Plate Montevideo	2023	Uruguayan Primera División	6	2	0	0	0	0	0	0	6	2
Career total			6	2	0	0	0	0	0	0	6	2
