= Alexis Olmedo =

Spanish footballer (born 2006)

Personal information
- Full name: Alexis Olmedo Vila
- Date of birth: 2 January 2006 (age 20)
- Place of birth: Manresa, Spain
- Height: 1.87 m (6 ft 2 in)
- Positions: Centre-back; right-back

Team information
- Current team: Celta B

Youth career
- Gimnàstic Manresa
- 2013–2024: Barcelona

Senior career*
| Years | Team | Apps | (Gls) |
| 2024–2026 | Barcelona B | 50 | (1) |
| 2026– | Celta B | 0 | (0) |

International career^{‡}
| 2021–2022 | Spain U16 | 7 | (1) |
| 2021–2023 | Spain U17 | 2 | (0) |
| 2025– | Spain U19 | 4 | (0) |
Medal record
Men's football
Representing Spain
UEFA European Under-19 Championship
| Runner-up | 2025 Romania |
- * Club domestic league appearances and goals as of 15 May 2026 ‡ National team caps and goals as of 26 June 2025

Alexis Olmedo Vila (born 2 January 2006) is a Spanish professional footballer who plays as a centre-back or right-back for Segunda División club RC Celta Fortuna.

== Club career ==
Born in Manresa, Barcelona, Catalonia, Olmedo joined FC Barcelona's youth sides from Club Gimnàstic de Manresa in 2013. He was first called up to Barcelona Atlètic in the late part of the 2022–23 season amid an injury crisis in defence. He was an unused substitute in the subsequent league match against La Nucía on 20 May 2023.

On 5 August 2026, Olmedo signed a four-year contract with RC Celta de Vigo, being initially assigned to the reserves in Segunda División.

== International career ==
A Spanish youth international, Olmedo has represented the Spanish U16 and U17 squads.

== Career statistics ==
=== Club ===
As of match played 26 October 2025

Appearances and goals by club, season and competition
| Club | Season | League | | | Cup | | Europe | | Other | | Total | |
| Club | Season | Division | Apps | Goals | Apps | Goals | Apps | Goals | Apps | Goals | Apps | Goals |
|---|---|---|---|---|---|---|---|---|---|---|---|---|
| Barcelona B | 2023–24 | Primera Federación | 10 | 1 | — | | — | | 1 (Note: Appearance in 2024 Primera Federación play-offs) | 0 | 11 | 1 |
| Barcelona B | 2024–25 | Primera Federación | 25 | 0 | — | | — | | — | | 25 | 0 |
| Barcelona B | 2025–26 | Segunda Federación | 8 | 0 | — | | — | | — | | 8 | 0 |
| Barcelona B | Total | | 43 | 1 | 0 | 0 | 0 | 0 | 1 | 0 | 44 | 1 |
| Career total | | | 43 | 1 | 0 | 0 | 0 | 0 | 1 | 0 | 44 | 1 |

== Honours ==
Barcelona

- UEFA Youth League: 2024–25

Spain U19

- UEFA European Under-19 Championship runner-up: 2025
