= Pablo Lúcio =

Brazilian footballer (born 2007)

Personal information
- Date of birth: 4 April 2007 (age 19)
- Place of birth: Joinville, Brazil
- Height: 1.88 m (6 ft 2 in)
- Position: Midfielder

Team information
- Current team: Flamengo
- Number: 56

Youth career
- Flamengo

Senior career*
| Years | Team | Apps | (Gls) |
| 2025– | Flamengo | 1 | (0) |
- * Club domestic league appearances and goals as of 6 December 2025

Pablo Lúcio (born 12 April 2007) is a Brazilian professional footballer who plays as a midfielder for Flamengo.

== Early life ==
Lúcio was born on 12 April 2007 in Joinville, Brazil. Growing up, he played futsal.

== Career ==
As a youth player, Lúcio joined the youth academy of Flamengo at the age of twelve. In 2025, he was promoted to the club's senior team. Brazilian news website CNN Brasil wrote in 2025 that he was "one of the most promising players from Flamengo's youth academy".
