= 2026 Under-20 Intercontinental Cup =

Football match

Real Madrid	Santiago Wanderers
(Spain)	(Chile)
3	1
- Date: 19 September 2026
- Venue: Bernabéu, Madrid
- Attendance: 52,117

The 2026 Under-20 Intercontinental Cup (Spanish: Sub-20 Intercontinental 2026) was the fifth edition of the UEFA–CONMEBOL Under-20 Intercontinental Cup, an annual one-off football match organised by UEFA and CONMEBOL between the winners of the U-20 Copa Libertadores and UEFA Youth League. As host confederation, UEFA was in charge of the main organization of this edition.

The match was played on 19 September 2026 at Bernabéu Stadium in Madrid, Spain, between the Spanish team Real Madrid, the 2025–26 UEFA Youth League champions, and Chilean team Santiago Wanderers, the 2026 U-20 Copa Libertadores champions. This is the first time this fixture had been played in Europe.

Real Madrid beat Santiago Wanderers 3–1, becoming the first Spanish side and the second European club to win the Under-20 Intercontinental cup since Benfica in 2022.

== Background ==
Real Madrid secured their first appearance in the U-20 Intercontinental Cup on 20 April 2026 when they defeated Belgium's Club Brugge 4–2 on penalties following a 1–1 draw in the final of the 2025–26 UEFA Youth League, which was their second continental youth title.

On the other hand, Santiago Wanderers won their first U-20 Copa Libertadores title on 22 March 2026 by beating Brazilian side Flamengo 5–4 on penalties after a 1–1 draw in the final of the 2026 edition, thus securing their participation in the 2026 U-20 Intercontinental Cup. It will be the first appearance of a Chilean team in this competition.

=== Participating teams ===
Team	Qualification
(Spain) Real Madrid	2025–26 UEFA Youth League champions
(Chile) Santiago Wanderers	2026 U-20 Copa Libertadores champions

== Pre-match ==
=== Officials ===
The officiating team was appointed by the UEFA Referee Commission; only referees in the FIFA International Referees List was eligible.

== Match ==
=== Details ===
19 September 2026
12:30 UTC+2

Real Madrid (Spain)	3–1	(Chile) Santiago Wanderers
Yáñez 29'; Santamaría 82'; Martín 90+9'	UEFA	Silva 49'

Bernabéu, Madrid
Attendance: 52,117
Referee: Damian Sylwestrzak (Poland)

Real Madrid	Santiago Wanderers
