= SE Palmeiras (youth) =

Palmeiras
- Full name: Sociedade Esportiva Palmeiras
- Nicknames: Verdão (Big Green); Porco (Pig) /Academia de Futebol (Football Academy)
- Founded: August 26, 1914; 111 years ago, as Palestra Italia
- Ground: Novelli Junior
- Capacity: 18,560
- President: Mauricio Galiotte
- Head coach: Paulo Victor (U20); Orlando Ribeiro (U17); Rafael Paiva (U15)
- Website: www.palmeiras.com.br
Home colors	Away colors	Third colors

The Sociedade Esportiva Palmeiras Youth System (Brazilian Portuguese: Categorias de Base) is the youth system of football department of Brazilian sports club Sociedade Esportiva Palmeiras. The youth sector is composed of various squads divided by age groups. The U-20 squad currently plays in the Campeonato Brasileiro Sub-20, the Copa do Brasil Sub-20 and the Copa São Paulo de Futebol Júnior. Palmeiras Academy Squads of all categories have won trophies at national and international level. The academy has produced many young successful players that have played in the youth levels of the Brazilian National team such as Gabriel Jesus.

== Under 20s ==
As of 31 January 2018

Note: Flags indicate national team as defined under FIFA eligibility rules; some limited exceptions apply. Players may hold more than one non-FIFA nationality.

No.	Pos.	Nation	Player
—	GK	BRA	Anderson Paixão
—	GK	BRA	Matheus Teixeira
—	GK	BRA	Marcos Vick
—	GK	BRA	Magrão
—	DF	BRA	Vitão
—	DF	BRA	Patrick
—	DF	BRA	Iago
—	DF	BRA	Willian
—	DF	BRA	Alberto
—	DF	BRA	Helder
—	DF	BRA	Gabriel Afonso
—	DF	BRA	Esteves
—	DF	BRA	Matheus Rocha
—	MF	BRA	Vitinho
—	MF	BRA	Wellington
—	MF	BRA	Alan
—	MF	BRA	Tomás
—	MF	BRA	Caio Cézar
—	MF	BRA	Matheus Neris
—	MF	BRA	Lincon

No.	Pos.	Nation	Player
—	MF	BRA	Patrick Carneiro
—	MF	BRA	Marcos Meloni
—	MF	BRA	Gabriel Menino
—	MF	BRA	Gabriel Furtado
—	MF	BRA	Romildo
—	MF	BRA	William Bartholdy
—	FW	BRA	Airton
—	FW	BRA	Leo Passos
—	FW	BRA	Barbosa
—	FW	BRA	Guilherme
—	FW	BRA	Wesley
—	FW	BRA	Papagaio
—	FW	BRA	Daniel Santos
—	FW	BRA	Bernardo
—	FW	BRA	Anibal
—	FW	BRA	Fernando
—	FW	BRA	Yan
—	FW	BRA	Itaitinga
—	FW	BRA	Diego
—	FW	BRA	Guilherme Vieira

== Under 17s ==
As of 31 January 2018

Note: Flags indicate national team as defined under FIFA eligibility rules; some limited exceptions apply. Players may hold more than one non-FIFA nationality.

No.	Pos.	Nation	Player
—	GK	BRA	Diogo
—	GK	BRA	Lucas Bergantin
—	GK	BRA	Leandro
—	DF	BRA	Kaique
—	DF	BRA	João Cesco
—	DF	BRA	Geovani
—	DF	BRA	Wanderson
—	DF	BRA	Luan
—	DF	BRA	Vinicius
—	MF	BRA	João Salles
—	MF	BRA	Tatavitto
—	MF	BRA	Caique
—	MF	BRA	Vitinho

No.	Pos.	Nation	Player
—	MF	BRA	Brendon
—	MF	BRA	Ramon
—	MF	BRA	Geilson
—	MF	BRA	Victor
—	FW	BRA	Guilherme
—	FW	BRA	Fabricio
—	FW	BRA	Marcos
—	FW	BRA	Washington
—	FW	BRA	Rondinely
—	FW	BRA	Nicolas
—	FW	BRA	Gabriel
—	DF	BRA	Daniel

== Academy graduates ==
Academy graduates currently in Europe.

Player	Current club	International Honours	Year left
Gabriel Jesus	(England) Manchester City	Brazil	2016
Danilo	(England) Nottingham Forest	Brazil	2022
Kevin	(England) Fulham		2024
Luis Guilherme	(England) West Ham		2024
Endrick	(Spain) Real Madrid	Brazil	2024
Vitor Reis	(England) Manchester City		2025

== Honours ==
=== National ===
- Campeonato Brasileiro Sub-20
  - Winners (4): 2018, 2022, 2024, 2025
- Copa do Brasil Sub-20
  - Winners (2): 2019, 2022
- Campeonato Brasileiro Sub-17
  - Winners (2): 2022, 2023
- Copa do Brasil Sub-17
  - Winners (4): 2017, 2019, 2022, 2023
- Supercopa do Brasil Sub-17
  - Winners (1): 2019
- Copa do Brasil Sub-15
  - Winners (1): 2012
- Copa Votorantim Sub-15
  - Winners (1): 2018

=== Inter-state ===
- Copa São Paulo de Futebol Júnior
  - Winners (2): 2022, 2023
- Supercopa São Paulo de Futebol Júnior
  - Winners (1): 1995
- Taça Belo Horizonte de Juniores
  - Winners (2): 1998, 2002
- Copa Rio Grande do Sul de Futebol
  - Winners (1): 2018
- Copa Santiago de Futebol Juvenil
  - Winners (2): 2018, 2020
- Copa Rio Sub-17
  - Winners (2): 2011
- Copa 2 de Julho
  - Winners (1): 2019

=== State ===
- Campeonato Paulista Sub-20
  - Winners (13): 1976, 1977, 1992, 1998, 2002, 2004, 2009, 2017, 2018, 2019, 2020, 2021, 2023
- Campeonato Paulista Sub-17
  - Winners (14): 1926, 1927, 1936, 1941, 1944, 1952, 1955, 1960, 1961, 1966, 1972, 2011, 2018, 2022
- Campeonato Paulista Sub-15
  - Winners (12): 1957, 1959, 1960, 1965, 1985, 2016, 2017, 2019, 2021, 2022, 2023, 2024
- Campeonato Paulista Sub-14
  - Winners (1): 2023
- Campeonato Paulista Sub-13
  - Winners (5): 1994, 2016, 2018, 2022, 2023
- Campeonato Paulista Sub-11
  - Winners (5): 2008, 2015, 2016, 2017, 2023

== See also ==
- SE Palmeiras
