= Campeonato Brasileiro Sub-20 =

Official Brazilian national football tournament for U-20 teams

- Founded: 2015
- Country: Brazil
- Divisions: 1
- Number of clubs: 20
- Level on pyramid: 1
- Current champions: Vasco da Gama (1st title) (2026)
- Broadcaster(s): SporTV

The Campeonato Brasileiro Sub-20 is the official Brazilian national football tournament for U-20 teams. The Rio Grande do Sul Football Association (FGF) created the competition in 2006 and since 2015 it is organized by the Brazilian Football Confederation (CBF).

== List of champions ==
Season	Champions	Runners-up
2006-2014	See Copa RS, organized by FGF	
Organized by CBF
2015	Fluminense (1)	Vitória
2016	Botafogo (1)	Corinthians
2017	Cruzeiro (1)	Coritiba
2018	Palmeiras (1)	Vitória
2019	Flamengo (1)	Palmeiras
2020	Atlético Mineiro (1)	Athletico Paranaense
2021	Internacional (1)	São Paulo
2022	Palmeiras (2)	Corinthians
2023	Flamengo (2)	Palmeiras
2024	Palmeiras (3)	Cruzeiro
2025	Palmeiras (4)	Red Bull Bragantino
2026	Vasco da Gama (1)	Palmeiras

=== Title by team ===
Rank	Club	Winners	Winning years
1	(São Paulo (state)) Palmeiras	4	2018, 2022, 2024, 2025
2	(Rio de Janeiro (state)) Flamengo	2	2019, 2023
3	(Rio de Janeiro (state)) Fluminense	1	2015
3	(Rio de Janeiro (state)) Botafogo	1	2016
3	(Minas Gerais) Cruzeiro	1	2017
3	(Minas Gerais) Atlético Mineiro	1	2020
3	(Rio Grande do Sul) Internacional	1	2021
3	(Rio de Janeiro (state)) Vasco da Gama	1	2026

=== Top scorers ===
Edition	Player	Club	Goals
2015	Matheus Pato	Fluminense	6
2016	Pedro Bortoluzo	São Paulo	8
2017	Gustavo Silva	Coritiba	9
2018	Rafael Elias	Palmeiras	12
2019	Evanilson	Fluminense	15
2020	Guilherme Santos	Atlético Mineiro	13
2021	Gabriel Silva	Palmeiras	16
2022	Arthur Sousa	Corinthians	8
2023	Weslley Patati	Santos	9
2024	Thalys	Palmeiras	13
2025	Luca Meirelles	Santos	13
2026	Felipe Gabriel	Palmeiras	15

== Campeonato Brasileiro Sub-20 Série B ==
In 2025, a second tier of the Brazilian Under-20 Championship was held, with 16 teams, chosen according to their score in the CBF Ranking. The top three teams will be promoted to the main division in 2026.

Season	Champions	Runners-up	Third place
2025	Avaí	Vitória	Criciúma

== See also ==
- Campeonato Brasileiro
- Campeonato Brasileiro Sub-23
- Campeonato Brasileiro Sub-17
