= 2023 CR Flamengo season =

Flamengo
2023 season
- President: Rodolfo Landim
- Head coach: Vítor Pereira (until 11 April 2023); Mário Jorge (caretaker, 11–16 April 2023, 28 September 2023 – 9 October 2023); Jorge Sampaoli (since 16 April 2023 – until 28 September 2023); Tite (since 9 October 2023)
- Stadium: Maracanã
- Série A: 4th
- Campeonato Carioca: Runners-up
- Copa do Brasil: Runners-up
- Copa Libertadores: Round of 16
- Supercopa do Brasil: Runners-up
- Recopa Sudamericana: Runners-up
- FIFA Club World Cup: 3rd place
- Top goalscorer: League: Pedro (13 goals); All: Pedro (35 goals)
- Highest home attendance: 71,411 (28 February 2023 vs Independiente del Valle, Recopa Sudamericana)
- Lowest home attendance: 20,670 (13 September 2023 vs Athletico Paranaense, Série A)
- Average home league attendance: 57,501
Home colours	Away colours	Third colours

The 2023 season is Clube de Regatas do Flamengo's 128th year of existence, their 112th football season, and their 53rd in the Campeonato Brasileiro Série A, having never been relegated from the top division. In addition to the 2023 Campeonato Brasileiro Série A, Flamengo will also compete in the Supercopa do Brasil, Recopa Sudamericana, CONMEBOL Copa Libertadores, the Copa do Brasil, and the Campeonato Carioca, the top tier of Rio de Janeiro's state football. Due to the 2022 FIFA World Cup being played in the December 2022 the 2022 FIFA Club World Cup moved its schedule to February 2023 into the Brazilian season, as the current Copa Libertadores champions Flamengo will play the competition for the second time.

== Kits ==
The 2023 home kit has been unveiled on 26 January in an event in the club's headquarter. The shirt has returned to being mostly red and has debuted in Supercopa do Brasil against Palmeiras.

On 13 April 2023, Flamengo debut the goalkeeper's first kit for the 2023 season in a Copa do Brasil match against Maringá.

On 10 May 2023, Flamengo and Adidas launched the team's away kit for the 2023 season.

On 24 May 2023, Flamengo debut the goalkeeper's second kit for the 2023 season in a Copa Libertadores match against Ñublense.

On 6 September 2023, Flamengo and Adidas officially presented the club's new third kit, mainly in black.

On 5 November 2023, Flamengo debut the goalkeeper's third kit for the 2023 season in a Campeonato Brasileiro Série A match against Fortaleza.

Supplier: Adidas
Sponsors: Banco BRB (Main sponsor) / Mercado Livre (Back of the shirt) / Assist Card (Lower back) / Pixbet (Shoulder) / Sil Cabos (Sleeves) / TIM (Numbers) / ABC da Construção (Shorts)

Home	Home alternate	Away	Away alternate	Third (2022–23)	Third alternate (2022–23)	Third (2023–24)
Goalkeeper	Goalkeeper alternate	Goalkeeper alternate 2	Goalkeeper alternate 3

== Season summary ==
=== Pre-season ===
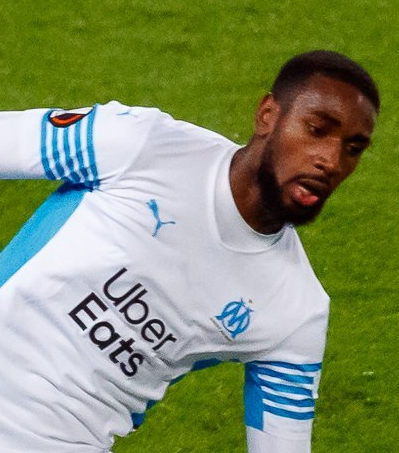
Gerson returned to Flamengo after one and a half year.

On 14 November 2022, Filipe Luís extended his contract for another year until 31 December 2023.

On 25 November 2022, head coach Dorival Júnior announced he and Flamengo mutually decided to not extend his contract for another season.

On 13 December 2022, Flamengo and Vítor Pereira agreed to sign the Portuguese as the new head coach. Despite the agreement both sides decided to not turn official until his contract runs out with Corinthians to avoid any legal problem.

On 14 December 2022, Vitor Gabriel extended his contract for another six months until 30 June 2024 and then loaned to Ceará for the 2023 season.

On 16 December 2022, David Luiz extended his contract for another year until 31 December 2023. On the same day Flamengo announced the permanent transfer of Ayrton Lucas with a €7m transfer fee, he signed a contract with the club until 31 December 2027.

On 31 December 2022, Flamengo announced an agreement with Olympique de Marseille to transfer back Gerson in a €15m transfer fee.

=== January ===
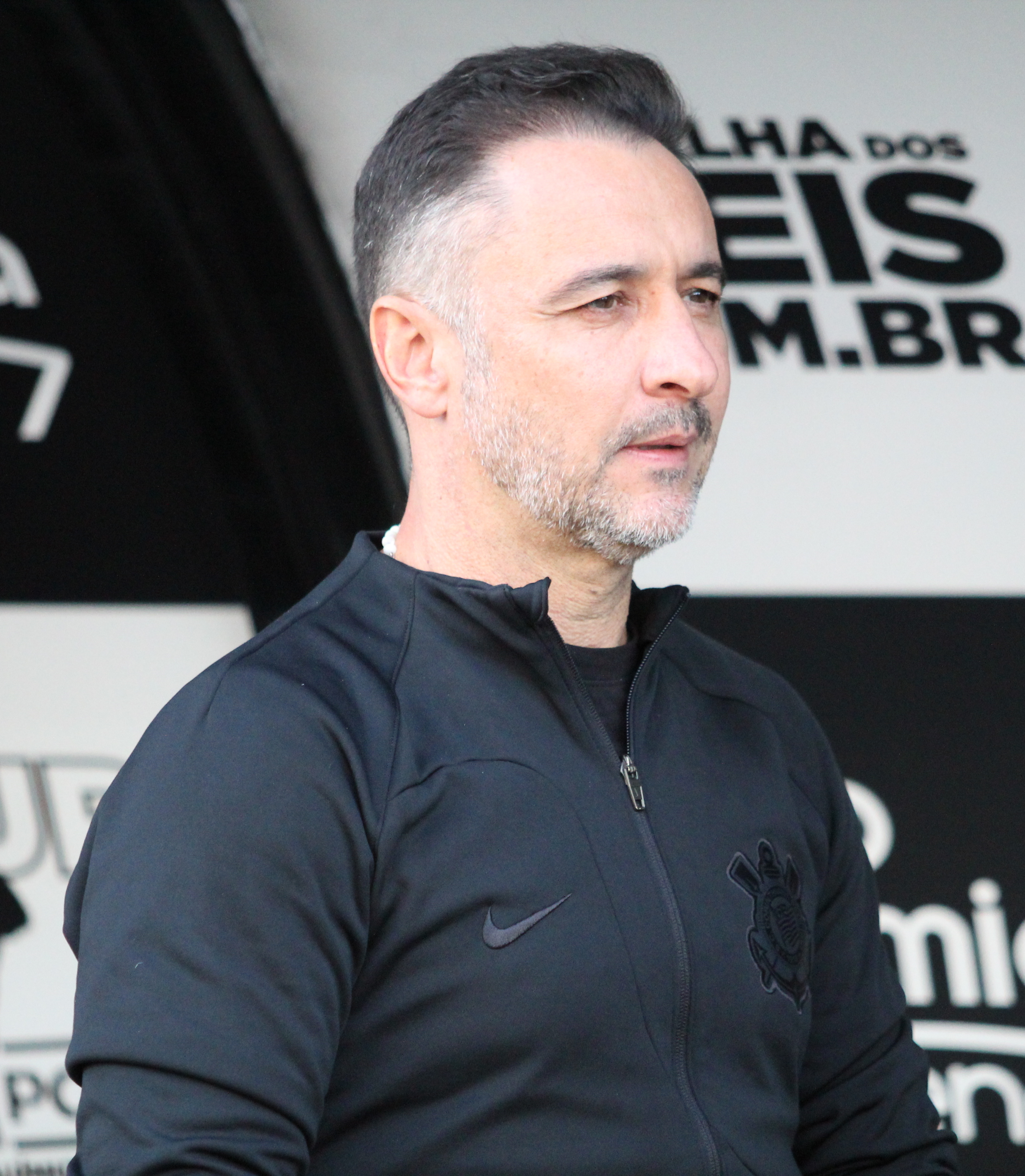
Pereira, the head coach until April 2023.

After the opening of the transfer window Flamengo presented Vítor Pereira as the new head coach on 3 January and Gerson on 5 January. Rodinei left the club at the end of contract moving to Super League Greece club Olympiacos and Matheus Thuler, previously on loan, made a permanent deal with J1 League club Vissel Kobe in a €910k transfer fee.

On 9 January, Flamengo confirmed Agustín Rossi signed a pre contract, moving on a free transfer from Boca Juniors at the end of his contract on 1 July. Flamengo still intended to pay a financial compensation to have the Argentine Goalkeeper already in January. Although Boca Juniors refused to hear any offer and moved him on loan to Al Nassr until June.

On 12 January, Hugo Souza transferred to Vissel Kobe on a €1.2m transfer fee, with Flamengo retaining 50% of a future transfer. Although, two days later Hugo withdrew the transfer claiming personal problems. Also on 12 January the club announced that Guillermo Varela, previously on loan, signed a pre contract for a permanent deal starting at the end of his constract with Dynamo Moscow on 1 July.

Due to calendar conflicts with FIFA Club World Cup the Campeonato Carioca started earlier for Flamengo with the matchday 5 match against Audax Rio being moved to 12 January. For the fourth season in a row Flamengo decided to play the first Campeonato Carioca matches with youth team players and younger professionals, this time with Mário Jorge (current U20 coach) as the head coach. In the opening match against Audax Rio Flamengo won 1–0, Matheus França scored the only goal of the match.

The draw of the 2022 FIFA Club World Cup was held on 13 January 2023 in Salé, Morocco, and decided the matchups of the second round and the opponents of the two second round winners in the semi-finals. Flamengo was scheduled to play on 7 February against the winner of the match between Wydad Casablanca and Al Hilal.

Vítor Pereira debuted as Flamengo head coach in the second match of the season, a 4–1 win against Portuguesa on 15 January.

On 19 January, was announced Ramon's transfer to Olympiacos, the Greek side agreed to pay a €1.5m transfer fee and Flamengo kept 30% of a future transfer.

Against Bangu on 24 January, once again Flamengo was managed by Mario Jorge and played with members of youth team plus Rodrigo Caio, still recovering from injury. Lorran scored Flamengo's only goal becoming the youngest goal scorer in club's history with 16 years and 204 days.

On 25 January, Pedro extended his contract until 31 December 2027.

After a battle between Olympique Lyonnais and Wolverhampton Wanderers to sign João Gomes, the midfielder finally transferred to the English side on 26 January. The Premier League club agreed to pay a €18.7m fee plus future clauses.

On 27 January, Léo Pereira extended his contract until 31 December 2027.

In a thrilling match with seven goals scored on 28 January Flamengo lost the Supercopa do Brasil to Palmeiras 4–3.

=== February ===
On 7 February, Flamengo debuted in the semi-finals of the FIFA Club World Cup against Saudi club Al Hilal and surprisingly lost 3–2 after playing the entire second half with one player less. Four days later on 11 February, Flamengo played the third place match against Egypt club Al Ahly winning 4–2 with Pedro and Gabriel Barbosa each scoring a brace. On this match Giorgian de Arrascaeta reached the mark of 200 official matches for the club.

On 15 February, Flamengo won Volta Redonda 3–1 and despite missing a penalty kick Gabriel Barbosa once again scored two goals reaching the club's top 10 all-time top scorers.

On 21 February, Flamengo played the first leg of the 2023 Recopa Sudamericana against Independiente del Valle. The match was played in the Estadio Banco Guayaquil in Quito. The Ecuadorian club won 1–0, goal scored in a header by Mateo Carabajal.

On 23 February, Matheus França extended his contract with Flamengo until 31 December 2028.

On 28 February, the second leg of the Recopa Sudamericana was played at the Maracanã Stadium with a season record attendance of 71,411. Flamengo won 1–0, Giorgian de Arrascaeta scored the winning goal on the last play of the match on the 96th minute. The score forced extra time which remained scoreless. Ironically Giorgian de Arrascaeta missed the only penalty kick in the shootout as Independiente del Valle lifted the trophy for the first time.

=== March ===
On 5 March, Flamengo lost the first Clássico dos Milhões of the season 1–0 against Vasco da Gama, the only goal was scored by José Luis Rodríguez. Three days later on 8 March, Flamengo lost its second city derby on a row, this time the Fla–Flu. Despite scoring first with Everton Flamengo let Fluminense come from behind with Germán Cano and Gabriel Pirani winning 2–1. With this result Flamengo, already qualified to the Campeonato Carioca semi-finals, dropped two spots finishing third in the overall table.

After finishing in third place in the Taça Guanabara Flamengo would face Vasco da Gama again in the semi-finals. On 13 March the clubs played the first leg in a match full of defensive mistakes Vasco da Gama opened the score early, but Flamengo managed to come from behind winning 3–2, including a beautiful Giorgian de Arrascaeta's goal from a long range. The second leg was played six days later on 19 March. Flamengo won once again, this time 3–1 reaching the Campeonato Carioca finals for the third time in a row.

=== April ===
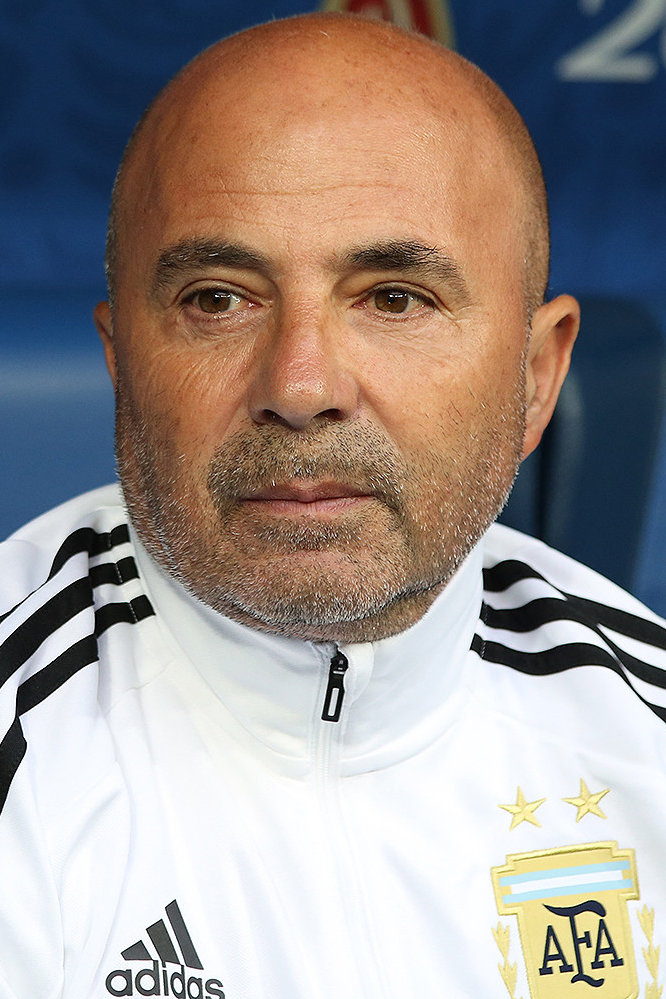
Jorge Sampaoli, signed on 14 April 2023.

On 1 April, the Campeonato Carioca finals first leg was played. Flamengo faced Fluminense for the second year in a row and had a solid match winning 2–0, Ayrton Lucas and Pedro scored the goals.

On 5 April, the Copa Libertadores defending champions Flamengo debuted in the 2023 edition. Playing in Ecuador against Aucas, a club that never played in the top continental competition before, head coach Vítor Pereira decided to mix the starting line-up considering the second match of the Campeonato Carioca finals to be played four days later. Even with Flamengo scoring first with Matheus França the team allowed Aucas to come from behind and win 2–1.

Despite a strong finals first leg, on the second fixture Flamengo played a terrible match being dominated by Fluminense and losing 4–1 on 9 April. Another disappointing result in the season increasing the pressure over the Portuguese head coach.

With the series of bad results in the beginning of the season club's directors decided to sack Vítor Pereira on 11 April, appointing Mário Jorge as caretaker for the following matches.

The first match played after the departure of Vítor Pereira was played on 13 April, the first leg of the 2023 Copa do Brasil third round against Campeonato Brasileiro Série D club Maringá. Playing away Flamengo had another bad match and lost 2–0, including an own goal scored by David Luiz.

On 14 April, Flamengo officially announced Jorge Sampaoli as the club's new head coach.

Flamengo debuted in 2023 Campeonato Brasileiro Série A still under Mário Jorge control on 16 April, at the Maracanã Stadium Flamengo easily beat Coritiba 3–0.

The first match under Jorge Sampaoli control was played on 19 April against Chilean club Ñublense, a Copa Libertadores fixture at Maracanã Stadium. Flamengo didn't have any trouble to win 2–0, both goals scored by Pedro and assisted by Marinho.

On 26 April, the 2023 Copa do Brasil third round second leg match was played at Maracanã Stadium. An early goal scored by Thiago Maia in the second minute led Flamengo to an 8–2 win reverting the bad result in the first leg and advancing to the next phase with an 8–4 on aggregate score. Pedro scored four goals, the second time he did this as a Flamengo player, and Arturo Vidal netted two assists.

=== May ===
On 18 May, Flamengo officially announced that Luiz Araújo will transfer from Atlanta United, on the next transfer window in July, for a €9m transfer fee.

=== June ===
On 5 June, Flamengo and Vasco da Gama played another Clássico dos Milhões derby, this time in the 2023 Campeonato Brasileiro Série A at Maracanã Stadium. Flamengo dominated almost the entire match winning 4–1, all Mengão goals were scored in the first half.

=== July ===
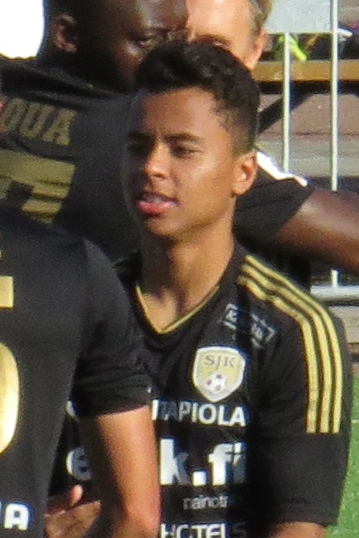
Allan signed from Atlético Mineiro.

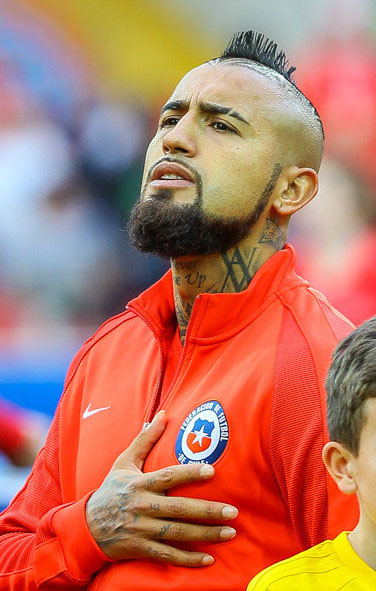
Arturo Vidal left the club on 10 July 2023.

In the first fixture of the month, a Campeonato Brasileiro Série A match against Fortaleza, Flamengo won at home 2–0 with Gabriel Barbosa scoring the first goal of the evening and reaching the mark of 150 total goals for Flamengo, becoming the ninth player in club's history to achieve this number.

On 2 July, Allan has been officially announced as Flamengo's new player. Mengão signed him from rivals Atlético Mineiro for a €8.2m transfer free plus future bonus clauses. On the same day Goalkeeper Hugo Souza moved on a one-year loan to Primeira Liga club Chaves.

On 4 July 2023, Vitor Gabriel moved to K League 1 club Gangwon FC on a deal worth €550k.

For the fifth time in a row Flamengo and Athletico Paranaense were drawn to face each other in the Copa do Brasil, this time in the quarter-finals. The first leg was played at Maracanã Stadium on 5 July and, despite the early goal scored by Agustín Canobbio, Flamengo managed to come from behind in the second half, winning 2–1 with goals scored by Pedro and Bruno Henrique. The second leg was played on 12 July at Ligga Arena, Flamengo won 2–0 and advanced for the Copa do Brasil semi-finals for the third time in a row. After the match the club refused to concede any interviews in protest against referee controversies during the match.

On 8 July, Flamengo and Palmeiras met at Allianz Parque and draw 1–1, the match was marked by the fight on the streets between supporters from both clubs. During the braw a Flamengo supporter threw a glass bottle and hit Palmeiras supporter Gabriela Anelli in the head, eventually dying in the next day. Weeks later on 25 July, Rio de Janeiro police arrested Jonathan Messias Santos da Silva after he was identified as the one who threw the glass bottle.

Disappointed with losing space in the team and playing few minutes under the command of Jorge Sampaoli, Arturo Vidal negotiated a contract termination with Flamengo on 10 July. On the same day the Chilean player signed with Athletico Paranaense.

On 22 July, in a 1–1 draw against América Mineiro, Giorgian de Arrascaeta became the first non-Brazilian player in club's history to reach 100 Campeonato Brasileiro Série A matches.

On 29 July, Flamengo won Atlético Mineiro 2–1 at Arena Independência with the two goals scored in the final minutes, Giorgian de Arrascaeta in a free kick in the 79th and Wesley França in the 87th minute. During the second half Pedro refused to warm-up and after the match was assaulted by fitness coach Pablo Fernández with a punch in the mouth in the locker room. Pedro pressed charges against Fernández in the same night and in the following day the club dismissed the then fitness coach. On monday 31 July, Pedro missed the training session claiming pain in the face.

On 27 July, Victor Hugo was awarded 2023 Campeonato Brasileiro Série A Young Player of the Month of May.

On 30 July, Flamengo accepted Crystal Palace's offer for Matheus França, he moved to the Premier League club for a €20m transfer fee plus future bonus clauses. The transfer was officially announced days later on 5 August.

== Competitions ==
=== Overview ===
Competition	First match	Last match	Starting round	Final position	Record							
Competition	First match	Last match	Starting round	Final position	Pld	W	D	L	GF	GA	GD	Win %
Série A	16 April 2023	6 December 2023	Matchday 1	4th	38	19	9	10	56	42	+14	50.00
Copa do Brasil	13 April 2023	24 September 2023	Third round	Runners-up	10	6	2	2	18	7	+11	60.00
Campeonato Carioca	12 January 2023	9 April 2023	Matchday 1	Runners-up	15	10	2	3	28	13	+15	66.67
Copa Libertadores	5 April 2023	10 August 2023	Group stage	Round of 16	8	4	2	2	13	8	+5	50.00
Supercopa do Brasil	28 January 2023		Final	Runners-up	1	0	0	1	3	4	−1	0.00
Recopa Sudamericana	21 February 2023	28 February 2023	Final	Runners-up	2	1	0	1	1	1	+0	50.00
2022 FIFA Club World Cup	7 February 2023	11 February 2023	Semi-Final	3rd place	2	1	0	1	6	5	+1	50.00
Total					76	41	15	20	125	80	+45	53.95

Source: Competitions

=== Supercopa do Brasil ===
Flamengo qualified for the 2023 Supercopa do Brasil by winning the 2022 Copa do Brasil.

Goals, assists and red cards are shown.

28 January 2023 Final	Palmeiras	4–3	Flamengo	Brasília
16:30 UTC−3	Veiga 38', 58' (pen.); Menino 45+4' (Piquerez), 74'	Report	Gabriel 26' (pen.), 51' (Ribeiro); Pedro 61' (Ayrton Lucas)	Stadium: Arena BRB Mané Garrincha; Attendance: 56,095; Referee: Wilton Pereira Sampaio

=== FIFA Club World Cup ===
Flamengo qualified to the 2022 FIFA Club World Cup as the 2022 Copa Libertadores champions, the club entered the FIFA Club World Cup in the Semi-final.

==== Semi-final ====
Goals, assists and red cards are shown.

7 February 2023 Semi-final	Flamengo (Brazil)	2–3	(Saudi Arabia) Al Hilal	Tangier, Morocco
16:00 UTC−3	Pedro; Gerson (yellow card) 15' (yellow-red card) 45+8'	Report	Salem 4' (pen.), 45+9' (pen.); Vietto 70' (Salem)	Stadium: Ibn Batouta; Attendance: 42,496; Referee: István Kovács (Romania)

==== Third place ====
Goals, assists and red cards are shown.

11 February 2023 Third place	Al Ahly (Egypt)	2–4	(Brazil) Flamengo	Tangier, Morocco
12:30 UTC−3	Abdel Kader 38' (Maâloul), 60' (Fathy); Maâloul (penalty missed) 58' (pen.); Abdelfattah (red card) 69'	Report	Gabriel 11' (pen.), 85' (pen.); Pedro 77', 90+1'	Stadium: Ibn Batouta; Attendance: 30,216; Referee: Mustapha Ghorbal (Algeria)

=== Recopa Sudamericana ===
Flamengo qualified for the 2023 Recopa Sudamericana by winning the 2022 Copa Libertadores.

Goals, assists and red cards are shown.

21 February 2023 Final (1st leg)	Independiente del Valle (Ecuador)	1–0	(Brazil) Flamengo	Quito, Ecuador
21:30 UTC−3	Carabajal 69' (Sornoza); Ortíz (red card) 88'	Report		Stadium: Banco Guayaquil; Attendance: 8,811; Referee: Piero Maza (Chile)

28 February 2023 Final (2nd leg)	Flamengo (Brazil)	1–0 (a.e.t.) (1–1 agg.) (4–5 p)	(Ecuador) Independiente del Valle	Rio de Janeiro, Brazil
21:30 UTC−3	de Arrascaeta 90+6' (Everton)	Report		Stadium: Maracanã; Attendance: 71,411; Referee: Andrés Matonte (Uruguay)
	Penalties
	de Arrascaeta (penalty missed); David Luiz (penalty scored); Everton (penalty scored); Gerson (penalty scored); Gabriel (penalty scored)		Faravelli (penalty scored); Hoyos (penalty scored); Previtali (penalty scored); Schunke (penalty scored); Landázuri (penalty scored)

=== Campeonato Carioca ===
==== Taça Guanabara table ====
Pos	Team	Pld	W	D	L	GF	GA	GD	Pts	Qualification
1	Fluminense (C)	11	8	1	2	20	4	+16	25	Taça Guanabara Champion and advance to semifinals
2	Vasco da Gama	11	7	2	2	20	6	+14	23	Advance to semifinals
3	Flamengo	11	7	2	2	19	6	+13	23	Advance to semifinals
4	Volta Redonda	11	6	2	3	27	15	+12	20	Advance to semifinals
5	Botafogo	11	6	1	4	13	6	+7	19	Advance to Taça Rio semifinals
6	Audax Rio	11	4	4	3	14	13	+1	16	Advance to Taça Rio semifinals
7	Nova Iguaçu	11	3	4	4	8	11	−3	13	Advance to Taça Rio semifinals
8	Portuguesa	11	3	4	4	9	14	−5	13	Advance to Taça Rio semifinals
9	Bangu	11	3	3	5	6	17	−11	12	
10	Madureira	11	2	3	6	5	18	−13	9	
11	Boavista	11	1	3	7	11	23	−12	6	
12	Resende (R)	11	1	1	9	3	22	−19	4	Relegated

Source: FERJ
Rules for classification: 1) points; 2) wins; 3) goal difference; 4) goals scored; 5) head-to-head results; 6) disciplinary record; 7) random draw.
(C) Champions; (R) Relegated

==== Matches ====
Goals, assists and red cards are shown.

12 January 2023 1	Flamengo	1–0	Audax Rio	Rio de Janeiro
21:30 UTC−3	França	Report		Stadium: Maracanã; Attendance: 27,312; Referee: Wagner do Nascimento Magalhães

15 January 2023 2	Flamengo	4–1	Portuguesa	Rio de Janeiro
18:00 UTC−3	Pedro 12' (Ayrton Lucas); Gabriel; Fabrício Bruno; Maia	Report	Cariús 43'	Stadium: Maracanã; Attendance: 51,994; Referee: Alex Gomes Stéfano

18 January 2023 3	Madureira	0–0	Flamengo	Cariacica
19:00 UTC−3		Report		Stadium: Kléber Andrade; Attendance: 13,009; Referee: Grazianni Maciel Rocha

21 January 2023 4	Flamengo	5–0	Nova Iguacu	Rio de Janeiro
16:00 UTC−3	Pedro; Fabrício Bruno 30' (Everton); Gabriel	Report	Alves (red card) 43'	Stadium: Maracanã; Attendance: 50,930; Referee: Alexandre Vargas Tavares de Jesus

24 January 2023 5	Bangu	1–1	Flamengo	Volta Redonda
21:10 UTC−3	Renatinho 43'	Report	Lorran 56'	Stadium: Raulino de Oliveira; Attendance: N/A; Referee: Bruno Arleu de Araújo

1 February 2023 6	Flamengo	1–0	Boavista	Rio de Janeiro
21:10 UTC−3	Pedro 68' (Gabriel)	Report		Stadium: Maracanã; Attendance: 33,329; Referee: Yuri Elino Ferreira da Cruz

15 February 2023 7	Volta Redonda	1–3	Flamengo	Volta Redonda
21:10 UTC−3	Luizinho 45+1' (Lelê)	Report	Gabriel (penalty missed) 45+6' (pen.), 57' (Ribeiro), 74' (de Arrascaeta); Pedro 90+3' (Everton)	Stadium: Raulino de Oliveira; Attendance: 10,970; Referee: Bruno Mota Correia

18 February 2023 8	Resende	0–2	Flamengo	Volta Redonda
16:00 UTC−3		Report	Gonçalves; André Luiz 79' (Mateusão)	Stadium: Raulino de Oliveira; Attendance: N/A; Referee: Ewerton Marques Ribeiro

25 February 2023 9 Clássico da Rivalidade	Botafogo	0–1	Flamengo	Brasília
18:00 UTC−3	Carli (yellow card) 40' (yellow-red card) 70'; Soares (yellow card) 89' (yellow-red card) 89'; Marçal (red card) 90+5'	Report	Gonçalves 1'	Stadium: Arena BRB Mané Garrincha; Attendance: N/A; Referee: Tarcizo Pinheiro Caetano

5 March 2023 10 Clássico dos Milhões	Flamengo	0–1	Vasco da Gama	Rio de Janeiro
18:10 UTC−3		Report	Rodríguez 48'; Pedro Raul (penalty missed) 74 (pen.)	Stadium: Maracanã; Attendance: 69,020; Referee: Bruno Arleu de Araújo

8 March 2023 11 Fla–Flu	Flamengo	1–2	Fluminense	Rio de Janeiro
21:10 UTC−3	Everton	Report	Cano 53' (Arias); Pirani; Melo (red card) 90+2'	Stadium: Maracanã; Attendance: 56,409; Referee: Grazianni Maciel Rocha

==== Semi-finals ====
13 March 2023 First leg Clássico dos Milhões	Flamengo	3–2	Vasco da Gama	Rio de Janeiro
21:10 UTC−3	de Arrascaeta 26'; Pedro 42'; Fabrício Bruno 73' (de Arrascaeta); Gonçalves (yellow card) 90+4' (yellow-red card) 90+5'; Marinho (red card) 90+6'	Report	Pec 11'; Teixeira 59' (Pedro Raul)	Stadium: Maracanã; Attendance: 45,093; Referee: Wagner do Nascimento Magalhães

19 March 2023 Second leg Clássico dos Milhões	Vasco da Gama	1–3 (3–6 agg.)	Flamengo	Rio de Janeiro
18:00 UTC−3	Capasso 31' (Piton)	Report	Pedro 16', 84' (pen.); Ayrton Lucas	Stadium: Maracanã; Attendance: 49,779; Referee: Bruno Arleu de Araújo

==== Finals ====
1 April 2023 First leg Fla–Flu	Flamengo	2–0	Fluminense	Rio de Janeiro
20:30 UTC−3	Ayrton Lucas 51' (Everton); Pedro 70' (Ayrton Lucas)	Report	Xavier (red card) 72'	Stadium: Maracanã; Attendance: 65,234; Referee: Wagner do Nascimento Magalhães

9 April 2023 Second leg Fla–Flu	Fluminense	4–1 (4–3 agg.)	Flamengo	Rio de Janeiro
18:00 UTC−3	Marcelo; Cano 34' (Ganso), (penalty missed) 56' (pen.), 56'; Alexsander 65'	Report	Ayrton Lucas 90+8'	Stadium: Maracanã; Attendance: 65,075; Referee: Bruno Arleu de Araújo

=== Copa Libertadores ===
The draw for the group stage was held on 27 March 2023 on the CONMEBOL headquarters in Luque, Paraguay.

==== Group stage ====
Pos	Team	Pld	W	D	L	GF	GA	GD	Pts	Qualification	RAC	FLA	ÑUB	AUC
1	(Argentina) Racing	6	4	1	1	13	6	+7	13	Advance to round of 16	—	1–1	4–0	3–2
2	(Brazil) Flamengo	6	3	2	1	11	5	+6	11	Advance to round of 16	2–1	—	2–0	4–0
3	(Chile) Ñublense	6	1	2	3	3	10	−7	5	Transfer to Copa Sudamericana	0–2	1–1	—	2–1
4	(Ecuador) Aucas	6	1	1	4	6	12	−6	4		1–2	2–1	0–0	—

Source: CONMEBOL
Rules for classification: 1) Points; 2) Goal difference; 3) Goals scored; 4) Away goals scored; 5) CONMEBOL ranking.

Goals, assists and red cards are shown.

5 April 2023 1	Aucas (Ecuador)	2–1	(Brazil) Flamengo	Quito, Ecuador
19:00 UTC−3	Castillo 58' (Otero); Ordóñez 85' (Cuero)	Report	França	Stadium: Gonzalo Pozo Ripalda; Attendance: 5,006; Referee: José Argote (Venezuela)

19 April 2023 2	Flamengo (Brazil)	2–0	(Chile) Ñublense	Rio de Janeiro, Brazil
21:30 UTC−3	Pedro	Report		Stadium: Maracanã; Attendance: 48,895; Referee: Wilmar Roldán (Colombia)

4 May 2023 3	Racing (Argentina)	1–1	(Brazil) Flamengo	Avellaneda, Argentina
19:00 UTC−3	Hauche (yellow card) 25' (yellow-red card) 26'; Oroz 73'	Report	Gabriel 45+3' (Pulgar); Wesley (yellow card) 13' (yellow-red card) 70'	Stadium: Presidente Juan Domingo Perón; Attendance: 25,325; Referee: Jesús Valenzuela (Venezuela)

24 May 2023 4	Ñublense (Chile)	1–1	(Brazil) Flamengo	Concepción, Chile
21:30 UTC−3	Henríquez 73' (Rubio)	Report	Gabriel 34'	Stadium: Ester Roa; Attendance: 20,000; Referee: Esteban Ostojich (Uruguay)

8 June 2023 5	Flamengo (Brazil)	2–1	(Argentina) Racing	Rio de Janeiro, Brazil
21:00 UTC−3	Wesley; Victor Hugo 83' (Pulgar)	Report	M. Rojas 49' (Gómez)	Stadium: Maracanã; Attendance: 63,963; Referee: Gustavo Tejera (Uruguay)

28 June 2023 6	Flamengo (Brazil)	4–0	(Ecuador) Aucas	Rio de Janeiro, Brazil
21:30 UTC−3	Pedro 9'; Pereira 30' (de Arrascaeta); Bruno Henrique 42' (Ribeiro); Victor Hugo	Report		Stadium: Maracanã; Attendance: 62,924; Referee: Andrés Rojas (Colombia)

==== Round of 16 ====
The draw for the round of 16 was held on 5 July 2023.

Goals, assists and red cards are shown.

3 August 2023 1st leg	Flamengo (Brazil)	1–0	(Paraguay) Olimpia	Rio de Janeiro, Brazil
21:00 UTC−3	Bruno Henrique 49' (Gabriel)	Report		Stadium: Maracanã; Attendance: 67,066; Referee: Darío Herrera (Argentina)

10 August 2023 2nd leg	Olimpia (Paraguay)	3–1 (3–2 agg.)	(Brazil) Flamengo	Asunción, Paraguay
21:00 UTC−3	Torres; Ortiz 69' (Zabala); Bruera 80' (Zabala)	Report	Bruno Henrique 8' (de Arrascaeta)	Stadium: Defensores del Chaco; Attendance: N/A; Referee: Wilmar Roldán (Colombia)

=== Campeonato Brasileiro ===
==== League table ====
Pos	Team	Pld	W	D	L	GF	GA	GD	Pts	Qualification or relegation
2	Grêmio	38	21	5	12	63	56	+7	68	Qualification for Copa Libertadores group stage
3	Atlético Mineiro	38	19	9	10	52	32	+20	66	Qualification for Copa Libertadores group stage
4	Flamengo	38	19	9	10	56	42	+14	66	Qualification for Copa Libertadores group stage
5	Botafogo	38	18	10	10	58	37	+21	64	Qualification for Copa Libertadores second stage
6	Red Bull Bragantino	38	17	11	10	49	35	+14	62	Qualification for Copa Libertadores second stage

Source: CBF
Rules for classification: 1) points; 2) wins; 3) goal difference; 4) goals scored; 5) head-to-head results (only between two teams); 6) fewest red cards; 7) fewest yellow cards; 8) drawing of lots.

==== Results by round ====
Round	1	2	3	4	5	6	7	8	9	10	11	12	13	14	15	16	17	18	19	20	21	22	23	24	25	26	27	28	29	30	31	32	33	34	35	36	37	38
Ground	H	A	H	A	H	A	H	H	A	H	A	A	H	A	A	H	A	A	H	A	H	A	H	A	H	A	A	H	A	H	H	A	H	H	A	H	H	A
Result	W	L	L	L	W	W	W	D	W	W	L	W	W	D	D	D	W	L	D	W	D	W	L	D	W	D	W	W	L	W	L	W	W	D	W	L	W	L
Position	2	8	13	17	12	9	6	7	5	3	4	3	3	2	2	3	2	2	4	3	4	4	4	7	5	5	3	3	4	3	6	6	5	6	2	4	3	4
Points	3	3	3	3	6	9	12	13	16	19	19	22	25	26	27	28	31	31	32	35	36	39	39	40	43	44	47	50	50	53	53	56	59	60	63	63	66	66

Source: Matches
A = Away; H = Home; W = Win; D = Draw; L = Loss; P = Postponed

==== Matches ====
Goals, assists and red cards are shown.

16 April 2023 1	Flamengo	3–0	Coritiba	Rio de Janeiro
16:00 UTC−3	Ayrton Lucas; Gabriel 56' (pen.); Pedro	Report		Stadium: Maracanã; Attendance: 42,848; Referee: Rodrigo José Pereira de Lima

23 April 2023 2	Internacional	2–1	Flamengo	Porto Alegre
11:00 UTC−3	Maurício	Report	Gerson 63'	Stadium: Beira-Rio; Attendance: 42,759; Referee: Ramon Abatti Abel

30 April 2023 3 Clássico da Rivalidade	Flamengo	2–3	Botafogo	Rio de Janeiro
16:00 UTC−3	Pereira 58' (Fabrício Bruno), 85' (Ribeiro)	Report	Soares 30' (pen.), 71' (Tchê Tchê); Barbosa; Rafael (yellow card) 45+3' (yellow-red card) 51'	Stadium: Maracanã; Attendance: 53,138; Referee: Edina Alves Batista

7 May 2023 4	Athletico Paranaense	2–1	Flamengo	Curitiba
16:00 UTC−3	Roque; Erick 80'	Report	Gabriel 15' (pen.)	Stadium: Ligga Arena; Attendance: 32,949; Referee: Raphael Claus

10 May 2023 5	Flamengo	2–0	Goiás	Rio de Janeiro
20:00 UTC−3	Pedro 8' (pen.); Ribeiro 49' (Everton)	Report		Stadium: Maracanã; Attendance: 44,948; Referee: Sávio Pereira Sampaio

13 May 2023 6	Bahia	2–3	Flamengo	Salvador
16:00 UTC−3	Biel 35' (Thaciano); Ademir 51' (Thaciano); Rezende (yellow card) 40' (yellow-red card) 74'; Kanu (yellow card) 74' (yellow-red card) 77'	Report	França 23' (David Luiz); Gabriel 29' (pen.); David Luiz 45+4' (Everton)	Stadium: Itaipava Arena Fonte Nova; Attendance: 47,656; Referee: Paulo Cesar Zanovelli da Silva

21 May 2023 7	Flamengo	1–0	Corinthians	Rio de Janeiro
16:00 UTC−3	Pereira 90+4' (Everton)	Report		Stadium: Maracanã; Attendance: 64,871; Referee: Rafael Rodrigo Klein

27 May 2023 8	Flamengo	1–1	Cruzeiro	Rio de Janeiro
18:30 UTC−3	Gabriel (penalty missed) 20' (pen.); Ayrton Lucas 33' (Gabriel)	Report	Marlon	Stadium: Maracanã; Attendance: 65,270; Referee: Luiz Flávio de Oliveira

5 June 2023 9 Clássico dos Milhões	Vasco da Gama	1–4	Flamengo	Rio de Janeiro
20:00 UTC−3	Jair 58' (pen.)	Report	Pulgar 14' (de Arrascaeta); Gerson 16' (de Arrascaeta); Pedro 42' (Ayrton Lucas); Ayrton Lucas	Stadium: Maracanã; Attendance: 46,423; Referee: Bráulio da Silva Machado

11 June 2023 10	Flamengo	3–0	Grêmio	Rio de Janeiro
18:30 UTC−3	Everton 24' (Wesley); Pedro 65'; Bruno Henrique	Report		Stadium: Maracanã; Attendance: 62,967; Referee: Sávio Pereira Sampaio

22 June 2023 11	Red Bull Bragantino	4–0	Flamengo	Bragança Paulista
21:30 UTC−3	Eduardo 40' (Evangelista); Mosquera 49' (Fernandes), 81'; Alerrandro 76'	Report		Stadium: Nabi Abi Chedid; Attendance: 10,103; Referee: Anderson Daronco

25 June 2023 12	Santos	2–3	Flamengo	Santos
18:30 UTC−3	Mendoza 40' (Soteldo); Fernández 52'	Report	Everton; Ribeiro; Pulgar	Stadium: Vila Belmiro; Attendance: No attendance (closed gates); Referee: Wilton Pereira Sampaio

1 July 2023 13	Flamengo	2–0	Fortaleza	Rio de Janeiro
18:30 UTC−3	Gabriel 14' (de Arrascaeta); de Arrascaeta 64'	Report	Pikachu (penalty missed) 11' (pen.)	Stadium: Maracanã; Attendance: 64,583; Referee: Sávio Pereira Sampaio

8 July 2023 14	Palmeiras	1–1	Flamengo	São Paulo
21:00 UTC−3	Dudu 24'	Report	de Arrascaeta 81' (Ribeiro)	Stadium: Allianz Parque; Attendance: 40,229; Referee: Ramon Abatti Abel

16 July 2023 15 Fla–Flu	Fluminense	0–0	Flamengo	Rio de Janeiro
16:00 UTC−3		Report	Araújo (red card) 90+7'	Stadium: Maracanã; Attendance: 62,354; Referee: Sávio Pereira Sampaio

22 July 2023 16	Flamengo	1–1	América Mineiro	Rio de Janeiro
16:00 UTC−3	Victor Hugo 90+5' (de Arrascaeta)	Report	Azevedo 84'	Stadium: Maracanã; Attendance: 65,402; Referee: Rodrigo José Pereira de Lima

29 July 2023 17 Flamengo Atlético-MG rivalry	Atlético Mineiro	1–2	Flamengo	Belo Horizonte
21:00 UTC−3	Paulinho 33' (Saravia)	Report	de Arrascaeta 79'; Wesley 87' (de Arrascaeta)	Stadium: Independência; Attendance: 22,441; Referee: Flávio Rodrigues de Souza

6 August 2023 18	Cuiabá	3–0	Flamengo	Cuiabá
20:00 UTC−3	Matheus Alexandre 46'; Clayson 54' (Deyverson); Deyverson	Report		Stadium: Arena Pantanal; Attendance: 33,091; Referee: Anderson Daronco

13 August 2023 19	Flamengo	1–1	São Paulo	Rio de Janeiro
18:30 UTC−3	Pedro 90+6' (pen.)	Report	Lucas	Stadium: Maracanã; Attendance: 62,018; Referee: Rafael Rodrigo Klein

20 August 2023 20	Coritiba	2–3	Flamengo	Curitiba
16:00 UTC−3	Robson 15' (pen.); Edu 46'	Report	Gabriel 19' (pen.); de Arrascaeta; Gerson 90+4' (Araújo)	Stadium: Couto Pereira; Attendance: 31,851; Referee: Raphael Claus

26 August 2023 21	Flamengo	0–0	Internacional	Rio de Janeiro
18:30 UTC−3		Report		Stadium: Maracanã; Attendance: 50,076; Referee: Edina Alves Batista

2 September 2023 22 Clássico da Rivalidade	Botafogo	1–2	Flamengo	Rio de Janeiro
21:15 UTC−3	Sá 19'; Gabriel Pires (yellow card) (yellow-red card) (after match)	Report	Freitas 2' (o.g.); Bruno Henrique	Stadium: Nilton Santos; Attendance: 40,769; Referee: Raphael Claus

13 September 2023 23	Flamengo	0–3	Athletico Paranaense	Cariacica
21:30 UTC−3	Gabriel (red card) 67'	Report	Cacá 27'; Santana 84'; Bueno 90+7' (pen.)	Stadium: Kléber Andrade; Attendance: 20,670; Referee: Rafael Rodrigo Klein

20 September 2023 24	Goiás	0–0	Flamengo	Goiânia
19:00 UTC−3		Report		Stadium: Serrinha; Attendance: 13,799; Referee: Raphael Claus

30 September 2023 25	Flamengo	1–0	Bahia	Rio de Janeiro
16:00 UTC−3	Pedro 61' (pen.)	Report	Kanu (red card) 49'	Stadium: Maracanã; Attendance: 46,472; Referee: Sávio Pereira Sampaio

7 October 2023 26	Corinthians	1–1	Flamengo	São Paulo
21:00 UTC−3	Fábio Santos 79' (pen.)	Report	Gerson 54' (Ribeiro)	Stadium: Neo Química Arena; Attendance: 40,800; Referee: Anderson Daronco

19 October 2023 27	Cruzeiro	0–2	Flamengo	Belo Horizonte
19:00 UTC−3		Report	Ayrton Lucas 39'; Pedro 44' (pen.)	Stadium: Mineirão; Attendance: 37,073; Referee: Rafael Rodrigo Klein

22 October 2023 28 Clássico dos Milhões	Flamengo	1–0	Vasco da Gama	Rio de Janeiro
16:00 UTC−3	Gerson 76'	Report		Stadium: Maracanã; Attendance: 69,473; Referee: Raphael Claus

25 October 2023 29	Grêmio	3–2	Flamengo	Porto Alegre
21:30 UTC−3	Ferreira 76' (Villasanti); Nathan Fernandes 81' (Cristaldo); André Henrique 86' (Villasanti)	Report	Everton 42'; Araújo 89' (Ribeiro)	Stadium: Arena do Grêmio; Attendance: 22,325; Referee: Rodrigo José Pereira de Lima

1 November 2023 31	Flamengo	1–2	Santos	Brasília
20:00 UTC−3	Pedro 21'; Gerson (red card) 42'; Bruno Henrique (yellow card) 90+5' (yellow-red card) 90+5'	Report	Nonato 33'; Joaquim; Braga (yellow card) 75' (yellow-red card) 90'	Stadium: Arena BRB Mané Garrincha; Attendance: 64,708; Referee: Rafael Rodrigo Klein

5 November 2023 32	Fortaleza	0–2	Flamengo	Fortaleza
16:00 UTC−3		Report	Pedro 45' (Filipe Luís); Araújo 87' (Ayrton Lucas)	Stadium: Castelão; Attendance: 49,324; Referee: Anderson Daronco

8 November 2023 33	Flamengo	3–0	Palmeiras	Rio de Janeiro
21:30 UTC−3	Pedro; de Arrascaeta 81' (Everton)	Report	Gómez (red card) 48'	Stadium: Maracanã; Attendance: 64,590; Referee: Rodrigo José Pereira de Lima

11 November 2023 34 Fla–Flu	Flamengo	1–1	Fluminense	Rio de Janeiro
18:30 UTC−3	de Arrascaeta 45+2' (Pulgar); Gabriel (red card) 90+6'	Report	González 62' (Arias); Nino (red card) 90+6'	Stadium: Maracanã; Attendance: 64,399; Referee: Wilton Pereira Sampaio

23 November 2023 30	Flamengo	1–0	Red Bull Bragantino	Rio de Janeiro
21:30 UTC−3	de Arrascaeta 75' (Pulgar)	Report	Borbas (red card) 87'	Stadium: Maracanã; Attendance: 57,699; Referee: Bráulio da Silva Machado

26 November 2023 35	América Mineiro	0–3	Flamengo	Uberlândia
18:30 UTC−3		Report	Everton 29' (Ayrton Lucas); Pedro; Ribeiro 85' (Everton)	Stadium: Parque do Sabiá; Attendance: 38,174; Referee: Rodrigo José Pereira de Lima

29 November 2023 36 Flamengo Atlético-MG rivalry	Flamengo	0–3	Atlético Mineiro	Rio de Janeiro
19:30 UTC−3		Report	Paulinho 8' (Hulk); Edenílson; Rubens 82' (Pavón)	Stadium: Maracanã; Attendance: 65,305; Referee: Ramon Abatti Abel

3 December 2023 37	Flamengo	2–1	Cuiabá	Rio de Janeiro
16:00 UTC−3	Araújo; Pedro 45+4' (de Arrascaeta)	Report	Clayson 79' (pen.)	Stadium: Maracanã; Attendance: 63,148; Referee: Rodrigo José Pereira de Lima

6 December 2023 38	São Paulo	1–0	Flamengo	São Paulo
21:30 UTC−3	Luciano 26' (Welington)	Report		Stadium: Morumbi; Attendance: 36,618; Referee: Caio Max Augusto Vieira

=== Copa do Brasil ===
As Flamengo will participate in the 2023 Copa Libertadores, the club entered the Copa do Brasil in the third round.

==== Third round ====
Goals, assists and red cards are shown.

13 April 2023 1st leg	Maringá	2–0	Flamengo	Maringá
20:00 UTC−3	David Luiz 38' (o.g.); Serginho 58'	Report		Stadium: Willie Davids; Attendance: N/A; Referee: Flávio Rodrigues de Souza

26 April 2023 2nd leg	Flamengo	8–2 (8–4 agg.)	Maringá	Rio de Janeiro
21:30 UTC−3	Maia 2'; Pedro; Gabriel 29' (pen.); Gerson 45+3' (Ayrton Lucas); Everton 57' (Gabriel)	Report	Fabrício Bruno 38' (o.g.); Lopes	Stadium: Maracanã; Attendance: 53,753; Referee: Raphael Claus

==== Round of 16 ====
Goals, assists and red cards are shown.

16 May 2023 1st leg Fla-Flu	Fluminense	0–0	Flamengo	Rio de Janeiro
21:00 UTC−3	Melo (red card) 52'	Report		Stadium: Maracanã; Attendance: 59,295; Referee: Anderson Daronco

1 June 2023 2nd leg Fla-Flu	Flamengo	2–0 (2–0 agg.)	Fluminense	Rio de Janeiro
20:00 UTC−3	de Arrascaeta 33' (Fabrício Bruno); Gabriel 90+2'	Report		Stadium: Maracanã; Attendance: 69,978; Referee: Raphael Claus

==== Quarter-finals ====
Goals, assists and red cards are shown.

5 July 2023 1st leg	Flamengo	2–1	Athletico Paranaense	Rio de Janeiro
21:30 UTC−3	Pedro 55' (pen.); Bruno Henrique 71' (de Arrascaeta)	Report	Canobbio 6' (Vitor Roque)	Stadium: Maracanã; Attendance: 66,505; Referee: Flávio Rodrigues de Souza

12 July 2023 2nd leg	Athletico Paranaense	0–2 (1–4 agg.)	Flamengo	Curitiba
21:30 UTC−3	Thiago Heleno (red card) 90+1'	Report	Erick 45' (o.g.); Gabriel; Gerson (red card) 90+1'	Stadium: Ligga Arena; Attendance: 37,842; Referee: Bráulio da Silva Machado

==== Semi-finals ====
Goals, assists and red cards are shown.

26 July 2023 1st leg	Grêmio	0–2	Flamengo	Porto Alegre
21:30 UTC−3	Kannemann (yellow card) 51' (yellow-red card) 59'	Report	Gabriel, (penalty missed) 40' (pen.); Maia 68' (de Arrascaeta)	Stadium: Arena do Grêmio; Attendance: 52,932; Referee: Raphael Claus

16 August 2023 2nd leg	Flamengo	1–0 (3–0 agg.)	Grêmio	Rio de Janeiro
21:30 UTC−3	de Arrascaeta 74' (pen.)	Report		Stadium: Maracanã; Attendance: 65,310; Referee: Bráulio da Silva Machado

==== Finals ====
Goals, assists and red cards are shown.

17 September 2023 1st leg	Flamengo	0–1	São Paulo	Rio de Janeiro
16:00 UTC−3		Report	Calleri 45+1' (Nestor)	Stadium: Maracanã; Attendance: 67,350; Referee: Anderson Daronco

24 September 2023 2nd leg	São Paulo	1–1 (2–1 agg.)	Flamengo	São Paulo
16:00 UTC−3	Nestor 45+5'	Report	Bruno Henrique 44'	Stadium: Morumbi; Attendance: 63,077; Referee: Bráulio da Silva Machado

== Management team ==
As of 9 October 2023.

Position	Name
Coaching staff
Head coach	(Brazil) Tite
Assistant head coach	(Brazil) Cléber Xavier
Assistant head coach	(Brazil) Matheus Bachi
Assistant head coach	(Brazil) César Sampaio
Assistant head coach	(Brazil) Diogo Meschine
Goalkeepers trainer	(Brazil) Rogério Maia
Goalkeepers trainer	(Brazil) Thiago Eller
Performance analyst	(Brazil) Lucas Oliveira
Performance analyst	(Brazil) Wellington Sales
Performance analyst	(Brazil) Eduardo Coimbra
Performance analyst	(Brazil) Daniel Motta
Performance analyst	(Brazil) Henrique Américo
Coordinator	(Brazil) Gabriel Andreata
Medical staff
Fitness coach	(Brazil) Fábio Mahseredjian
Health and high performance manager	(Brazil) Marcio Tannure
Doctor	(Brazil) Marcelo Soares
Doctor	(Brazil) Fernando Bassan
Physiotherapist	(Brazil) Mario Peixoto
Physiotherapist	(Brazil) Marcio Puglia
Physiotherapist	(Brazil) Laniyan Neves
Physiotherapist	(Brazil) Alam Santos
Physiotherapist	(Brazil) Fábio Feitosa

== Roster ==
List of currently full members of the professional team, youth players are also often used.

As of 12 September 2023

No.	Pos.	Name	Date of birth (age)	Signed in	Contract end	Signed from	Transfer fee	Notes
Goalkeepers
1	GK	(Brazil) Santos	17 March 1990 (aged 33)	2022	2026	(Brazil) Athletico Paranaense	€3m	
17	GK	(Argentina) Agustín Rossi	21 August 1995 (aged 28)	2023	2027	(Argentina) Boca Juniors	Free	
25	GK	(Brazil) Matheus Cunha	24 May 2001 (aged 22)	2022	2025	Youth system		
Defenders
2	RB	(Uruguay) Guillermo Varela	24 March 1993 (aged 30)	2022	2025	(Russia) Dynamo Moscow	Free	
3	CB	(Brazil) Rodrigo Caio	17 August 1993 (aged 30)	2019	2023	(Brazil) São Paulo	€5m	
4	CB	(Brazil) Léo Pereira	31 January 1996 (aged 27)	2020	2027	(Brazil) Athletico Paranaense	€6.1m	
6	LB	(Brazil) Ayrton Lucas	19 June 1997 (aged 26)	2022	2027	(Russia) Spartak Moscow	€7m	
15	CB	(Brazil) Fabrício Bruno	12 February 1996 (aged 27)	2022	2025	(Brazil) Red Bull Bragantino	€2.5m	
16	LB	(Brazil) Filipe Luís	9 August 1985 (aged 38)	2019	2023	(Spain) Atlético Madrid	Free	
23	CB	(Brazil) David Luiz	22 April 1987 (aged 36)	2021	2023	(England) Arsenal	Free	Third Captain
30	CB	(Brazil) Pablo	21 June 1991 (aged 32)	2022	2025	(Russia) Lokomotiv Moscow	€2.5m	
33	CB	(Brazil) Cleiton	25 April 2003 (aged 20)	2022	2025	Youth system		
34	RB	(Brazil) Matheuzinho	8 September 2000 (aged 23)	2020	2026	(Brazil) Londrina	€180k	
43	RB	(Brazil) Wesley França	6 September 2003 (aged 20)	2021	2025	Youth system		
	CB	(Brazil) Gabriel Noga	25 January 2002 (aged 21)	2020	2024	Youth system		
	RB	(Paraguay) Santiago Ocampos	22 January 2002 (aged 21)	2022	2024	(Israel) Beitar Jerusalem	Free	
Midfielders
5	DM	(Chile) Erick Pulgar	15 January 1994 (aged 29)	2022	2025	(Italy) Fiorentina	€3m	
7	AM	(Brazil) Éverton Ribeiro	10 April 1989 (aged 34)	2017	2023	(United Arab Emirates) Al-Ahli	€6m	Captain
8	DM	(Brazil) Thiago Maia	23 March 1997 (aged 26)	2020	2026	(France) Lille	€4m	
14	AM	(Uruguay) Giorgian de Arrascaeta	1 June 1994 (aged 29)	2019	2026	(Brazil) Cruzeiro	€15m	
20	CM	(Brazil) Gerson	20 May 1997 (aged 26)	2023	2027	(France) Olympique de Marseille	€15m	
21	DM	(Brazil) Allan	3 March 1997 (aged 26)	2023	2027	(Brazil) Atlético Mineiro	€8.2m	
28	CM	(Brazil) Daniel Cabral	14 May 2002 (aged 21)	2020	2025	Youth system		
29	CM	(Brazil) Victor Hugo	11 May 2004 (aged 19)	2022	2027	Youth system		
Forwards
9	CF	(Brazil) Pedro	20 June 1997 (aged 26)	2020	2027	(Italy) Fiorentina	€14m	
10	CF	(Brazil) Gabriel Barbosa	30 August 1996 (aged 27)	2019	2024	(Italy) Inter Milan	€17m	Vice Captain
11	LW	(Brazil) Everton	22 March 1996 (aged 27)	2022	2026	(Portugal) Benfica	€13.5m	
27	LW	(Brazil) Bruno Henrique	30 December 1990 (aged 33)	2019	2023	(Brazil) Santos	€5.4m	
31	RW	(Brazil) Luiz Araújo	2 June 1996 (aged 27)	2023	2027	(United States) Atlanta United	€9m	
38	CF	(Brazil) André Luiz	23 February 2002 (aged 21)	2021	2024	Youth system		

- - Currently injured

=== New contracts ===
No.	Pos.	Player	Date	Until	Source
16	DF	(Brazil) Filipe Luís	14 November 2022	31 December 2023	
	MF	(Brazil) Khauan Schlickmann	12 December 2022	31 December 2024	
	FW	(Brazil) Vitor Gabriel	14 December 2022	30 June 2024	
23	DF	(Brazil) David Luiz	16 December 2022	31 December 2023	
43	DF	(Brazil) Wesley França	January 2023	31 December 2025	
9	FW	(Brazil) Pedro	25 January 2023	31 December 2027	
4	DF	(Brazil) Léo Pereira	27 January 2023	31 December 2027	
42	MF	(Brazil) Matheus França	23 February 2023	31 December 2028	
48	MF	(Brazil) Igor Jesus	3 June 2023	31 December 2025	
25	GK	(Brazil) Matheus Cunha	6 June 2023	31 December 2025	
	GK	(Brazil) Leonardo Nannetti	22 August 2023	31 December 2026	

== Transfers and loans ==
=== Transfers in ===
Pos.	Player	Transferred from	Fee	Date	Team	Source
HC	(Portugal) Vítor Pereira	Free agent	Free	1 January 2023	First Team	
DF	(Brazil) Ayrton Lucas	(Russia) Spartak Moscow	R$39.6m / €7m	1 January 2023	First Team	
MF	(Brazil) Gerson	(France) Olympique de Marseille	R$85.1m / €15m	1 January 2023	First Team	
DF	(Brazil) Patrick	(Brazil) Tombense	Loan return	1 January 2023	First Team	
DF	(Brazil) Ramon	(Brazil) Red Bull Bragantino	Loan return	1 January 2023	First Team	
DF	(Brazil) Gabriel Noga	(Brazil) Bahia	Loan return	1 January 2023	First Team	
MF	(Brazil) Pedrinho	(Brazil) Azuriz	Loan return	1 January 2023	Academy	
FW	(Brazil) Thiago Fernandes	(United States) Houston Dynamo	Loan return	1 January 2023	First Team	
DF	(Colombia) Samuel Bello	(Colombia) Millionarios	Undisclosed	2 February 2023	Academy	
HC	(Argentina) Jorge Sampaoli	Free agent	Free	14 April 2023	First Team	
GK	(Argentina) Agustín Rossi	(Argentina) Boca Juniors	Free	1 July 2023	First Team	
DF	(Uruguay) Guillermo Varela	(Russia) Dynamo Moscow	Free	1 July 2023	First Team	
FW	(Brazil) Luiz Araújo	(United States) Atlanta United	R$48.7m / €9m	1 July 2023	First Team	
MF	(Brazil) Allan	(Brazil) Atlético Mineiro	R$42.8m / €8.2m	2 July 2023	First Team	
FW	(Brazil) Kauan Pereira	(Brazil) São Bento	Free	25 July 2023	Academy	
Total			R$216.2m / €39.2m			

=== Loan in ===
Pos.	Player	Loaned from	Fee	Start	End	Team	Source
FW	(Brazil) Gustavo Krug	(Brazil) Azuriz	Undisclosed	16 February 2023	30 June 2024	Academy	
FW	(Nigeria) Oluwashola Ogundana	(Nigeria) Remo Stars F.C.	Undisclosed	26 April 2023	30 June 2024	Academy	

=== Transfers out ===
Pos.	Player	Transferred to	Fee	Date	Team	Source
MF	(Brazil) Diego Ribas	Retired	End of contract	1 January 2023	First Team	
GK	(Brazil) Diego Alves	Free agent	End of contract	1 January 2023	First Team	
HC	(Brazil) Dorival Júnior	Free agent	End of contract	1 January 2023	First Team	
DF	(Brazil) Rodinei	(Greece) Olympiacos	End of contract	1 January 2023	First Team	
DF	(Brazil) Patrick	(Brazil) Bangu	End of contract	1 January 2023	First Team	
MF	(Brazil) Yuri de Oliveira	Free agent	End of contract	1 January 2023	First Team	
FW	(Brazil) Pedro Arthur	(Brazil) Juventude	End of contract	1 January 2023	Academy	
DF	(Brazil) Matheus Thuler	(Japan) Vissel Kobe	R$5m / €910k	1 January 2023	First Team	
GK	(Brazil) Hugo Souza	(Japan) Vissel Kobe	R$6.7m / €1.2m	12 January 2023	First Team	
DF	(Brazil) Ramon	(Greece) Olympiacos	R$8.4m / €1.5m	19 January 2023	First Team	
MF	(Brazil) João Gomes	(England) Wolverhampton Wanderers	R$103.2m / €18.7m	26 January 2023	First Team	
MF	(Brazil) Weverson	(Brazil) Fotaleza	Undisclosed	15 March 2023	First Team	
HC	(Portugal) Vítor Pereira	Sacked	Undisclosed	11 April 2023	First Team	
FW	(Brazil) Marinho	(Brazil) Fortaleza	R$1.9m / €370k	19 June 2023	First Team	
DF	(Brazil) Otávio	(Portugal) Famalicão	R$2.6m / €500k	1 July 2023	First Team	
DF	(Brazil) Gustavo Henrique	(Turkey) Fenerbahçe	R$7.3m / €1.4m	1 July 2023	First Team	
FW	(Brazil) Vitor Gabriel	(South Korea) Gangwon FC	R$2.9m / €550k	4 July 2023	First Team	
MF	(Chile) Arturo Vidal	(Brazil) Athletico Paranaense	Free	10 July 2023	First Team	
FW	(Brazil) Mateusão	(United Arab Emirates) Shabab Al Ahli	R$10.6m / €2.0m	22 July 2023	First Team	
MF	(Brazil) Matheus França	(England) Crystal Palace	R$104.4m / €20.0m	30 July 2023	First Team	
FW	(Brazil) Ryan Luka	(Brazil) Fortaleza	Undisclosed	1 August 2023	Academy	
GK	(Brazil) Kauã Santos	(Germany) Eintracht Frankfurt	R$8.4m / €1.6m	24 August 2023	Academy	
Total			R$272.7m / €48.5m			

Transfer canceled

=== Loan out ===
Pos.	Player	Loaned to	Fee	Start	End	Team	Source
FW	(Brazil) Vitor Gabriel	(Brazil) Ceará	Free	1 January 2023	31 December 2023	First Team	
DF	(Brazil) Otávio	(Portugal) Famalicão	Free	1 January 2023	31 December 2023	First Team	
FW	(Brazil) Thiago Fernandes	(Brazil) CSA	Free	6 February 2023	31 December 2023	First Team	
GK	(Brazil) Hugo Souza	(Portugal) Chaves	R$1.0m / €0.2m	2 July 2023	30 June 2024	First Team	
MF	(Brazil) Matheus Gonçalves	(Brazil) Red Bull Bragantino	Free	26 July 2023	31 December 2023	First Team	
FW	(Brazil) Thiago Fernandes	(Brazil) Sampaio Corrêa	Free	19 July 2023	31 December 2023	First Team	
Total			R$1.0m / €0.2m				

== Statistics ==
=== Manager records ===
Name	Nat	Record							
Name	Nat	G	W	D	L	GF	GA	GD	Win %
Mário Jorge (interim/caretaker)	Brazil	6	3	2	1	7	4	+3	50.00
Vítor Pereira	Portugal	18	10	1	7	36	24	+12	55.56
Rui Quinta (interim)	Portugal	1	1	0	0	1	0	+1	100.00
Jorge Sampaoli	Argentina	39	20	11	8	63	41	+22	51.28
Tite	Brazil	12	7	1	4	18	11	+7	58.33
Total		76	41	15	20	125	80	+45	53.95

=== Appearances ===
Source: Soccerway, FBRef

Players in italics have left the club before the end of the season.
^{†} Denotes two way player, youth and professional team.

No.	Pos.	Name	Série A		Copa do Brasil		Libertadores		Carioca		Other (Note: Includes Supercopa do Brasil, Recopa Sudamericana and FIFA Club World Cup.)		Total		
No.	Pos.	Name	Starts	Subs	Starts	Subs	Starts	Subs	Starts	Subs	Starts	Subs	Starts	Subs	Apps
Goalkeepers
1	GK	(Brazil) Santos	5	1	3	0	3	0	9	0	5	0	25	1	26
17	GK	(Argentina) Agustín Rossi	15	0	1	0	0	0	—	—	—	—	16	0	16
25	GK	(Brazil) Matheus Cunha	18	1	6	0	5	0	6	0	0	0	35	1	36
49	GK	(Brazil) Dyogo Alves^{†}	—	—	—	—	—	—	0	0	—	—	0	0	0
55	GK	(Brazil) Caio Barone^{†}	—	—	—	—	—	—	0	0	—	—	0	0	0
60	GK	(Brazil) Lucas Furtado^{†}	—	—	—	—	—	—	0	0	—	—	0	0	0
Defenders
2	RB	(Uruguay) Guillermo Varela	3	2	2	1	1	1	6	1	4	0	16	5	21
3	CB	(Brazil) Rodrigo Caio	0	5	0	0	1	1	6	0	0	0	7	6	13
4	CB	(Brazil) Léo Pereira	32	0	6	2	3	1	5	2	2	0	48	5	53
6	LB	(Brazil) Ayrton Lucas	29	6	8	0	4	3	8	2	5	0	54	11	65
15	CB	(Brazil) Fabrício Bruno	34	0	10	0	6	1	8	1	3	1	61	3	64
16	LB	(Brazil) Filipe Luís	6	4	1	1	4	1	2	2	0	0	13	8	21
23	CB	(Brazil) David Luiz	11	4	5	0	6	0	8	0	5	0	34	4	38
30	CB	(Brazil) Pablo	4	3	0	0	1	0	5	1	0	1	10	5	15
33	CB	(Brazil) Cleiton^{†}	0	0	—	—	—	—	3	0	—	—	3	0	3
34	RB	(Brazil) Matheuzinho	7	4	0	2	0	0	6	3	1	2	14	11	25
39	CB	(Brazil) Zé Welinton^{†}	0	0	0	0	—	—	—	—	—	—	0	0	0
43	RB	(Brazil) Wesley França	27	8	8	1	6	1	3	0	—	—	44	10	54
47	LB	(Brazil) Marcos Paulo^{†}	—	—	—	—	—	—	1	0	—	—	1	0	1
50	CB	(Brazil) Diego Santos^{†}	—	—	—	—	—	—	0	1	—	—	0	1	1
51	CB	(Brazil) Daniel Sales^{†}	—	—	—	—	—	—	0	0	—	—	0	0	0
54	CB	(Brazil) Darlan^{†}	—	—	—	—	—	—	0	0	—	—	0	0	0
	CB	(Brazil) Gabriel Noga	—	—	—	—	—	—	1	1	—	—	1	1	2
	RB	(Paraguay) Santiago Ocampos	—	—	—	—	—	—	—	—	—	—	0	0	0
Midfielders
5	DM	(Chile) Erick Pulgar	22	3	6	0	2	2	3	3	0	3	33	11	44
7	AM	(Brazil) Éverton Ribeiro	15	15	6	3	6	1	4	7	5	0	36	26	62
8	DM	(Brazil) Thiago Maia	26	6	7	3	6	1	9	1	5	0	53	11	64
14	AM	(Uruguay) Giorgian de Arrascaeta	22	6	7	0	4	1	8	1	5	0	46	8	54
20	CM	(Brazil) Gerson	31	1	9	0	5	1	10	0	2	1	57	3	60
21	DM	(Brazil) Allan	4	5	0	3	2	0	—	—	—	—	5	9	14
28	CM	(Brazil) Daniel Cabral	—	—	—	—	—	—	—	—	—	—	0	0	0
29	CM	(Brazil) Victor Hugo	12	18	5	3	2	4	1	1	—	—	20	26	46
48	DM	(Brazil) Igor Jesus^{†}	0	4	0	0	0	0	5	0	0	0	5	4	9
52	CM	(Brazil) Evertton Araújo^{†}	—	—	0	0	—	—	1	2	—	—	1	2	3
58	CM	(Brazil) Jean Carlos^{†}	—	—	—	—	—	—	0	0	—	—	0	0	0
59	CM	(Brazil) Rodriguinho^{†}	—	—	—	—	—	—	0	0	—	—	0	0	0
63	CM	(Brazil) Rayan Lucas^{†}	0	0	—	—	—	—	–	–	—	—	0	0	0
64	CM	(Brazil) Pedro Ignacio^{†}	—	—	—	—	—	—	0	0	—	—	0	0	0
Forwards
9	CF	(Brazil) Pedro	26	8	5	2	5	0	9	0	5	0	50	10	60
10	CF	(Brazil) Gabriel Barbosa	17	9	8	1	5	2	9	2	5	0	44	14	58
11	LW	(Brazil) Everton	21	12	2	4	1	6	7	6	0	5	31	33	64
19	CF	(Brazil) Lorran^{†}	0	0	—	—	—	—	1	3	—	—	1	3	4
26	LW	(Brazil) Werton^{†}	—	—	—	—	—	—	2	1	—	—	2	1	3
27	LW	(Brazil) Bruno Henrique	13	15	4	1	3	1	0	0	—	—	20	17	37
31	RW	(Brazil) Luiz Araújo	10	10	0	5	0	1	—	—	—	—	10	16	26
37	CF	(Brazil) Petterson^{†}	0	0	—	—	—	—	0	2	—	—	0	2	2
38	CF	(Brazil) André Luiz	0	2	0	0	—	—	0	3	—	—	0	5	5
41	CF	(Brazil) Ryan Luka^{†}	—	—	—	—	—	—	0	0	—	—	0	0	0
44	CF	(Brazil) Pedrinho^{†}	0	1	—	—	—	—	0	0	—	—	0	1	1
57	CF	(Brazil) Wallace Yan^{†}	—	—	—	—	—	—	0	0	—	—	0	0	0
Player(s) transferred out during the season
24	GK	(Brazil) Kauã Santos^{†}	—	—	—	—	—	—	0	0	—	—	0	0	0
31	RW	(Brazil) Marinho	0	4	0	2	2	0	3	4	0	1	5	11	16
32	CM	(Chile) Arturo Vidal	2	4	0	2	4	1	3	4	3	2	12	13	25
36	LB	(Brazil) Ramon	—	—	—	—	—	—	1	0	—	—	1	0	1
40	AM	(Brazil) Matheus Gonçalves^{†}	0	2	0	2	0	1	1	5	0	2	1	12	13
40	CF	(Brazil) Thiago Fernandes	—	—	—	—	—	—	2	0	—	—	2	0	2
42	AM	(Brazil) Matheus França	5	4	0	2	1	2	5	7	0	2	11	17	28
45	GK	(Brazil) Hugo Souza	0	0	—	—	0	0	0	0	0	0	0	0	0
46	CF	(Brazil) Mateusão^{†}	—	—	—	—	0	0	4	2	0	1	4	3	7
53	CM	(Brazil) Weverson^{†}	—	—	—	—	—	—	0	0	—	—	0	0	0

=== Goalscorers ===
Rank	Pos.	No.	Player	Série A	Copa do Brasil	Libertadores	Carioca	Other (Note: Includes Supercopa do Brasil, Recopa Sudamericana and FIFA Club World Cup.)	Total
1	FW	9	(Brazil) Pedro	13	5	3	9	5	35
2	FW	10	(Brazil) Gabriel Barbosa	5	4	2	5	4	20
3	MF	14	(Uruguay) Giorgian de Arrascaeta	7	2	0	1	1	11
4	FW	27	(Brazil) Bruno Henrique	2	2	3	0	0	7
4	DF	6	(Brazil) Ayrton Lucas	4	0	0	3	0	7
6	MF	20	(Brazil) Gerson	5	1	0	0	0	6
7	FW	11	(Brazil) Everton	3	1	0	1	0	5
8	DF	4	(Brazil) Léo Pereira	3	0	1	0	0	4
9	MF	8	(Brazil) Thiago Maia	0	2	0	1	0	3
9	DF	15	(Brazil) Fabrício Bruno	0	0	0	3	0	3
9	MF	29	(Brazil) Victor Hugo	1	0	2	0	0	3
9	MF	42	(Brazil) Matheus França	1	0	1	1	0	3
9	MF	7	(Brazil) Éverton Ribeiro	3	0	0	0	0	3
9	FW	31	(Brazil) Luiz Araújo^{†}	3	0	0	0	0	3
15	MF	5	(Chile) Erick Pulgar	2	0	0	0	0	2
15	MF	40	(Brazil) Matheus Gonçalves^{†}	0	0	0	2	0	2
15	DF	43	(Brazil) Wesley França	1	0	1	0	0	2
18	FW	19	(Brazil) Lorran^{†}	0	0	0	1	0	1
18	DF	23	(Brazil) David Luiz	1	0	0	0	0	1
18	FW	38	(Brazil) André Luiz	0	0	0	1	0	1
Own Goal(s)				1	1	0	0	0	2
Total				56	18	13	28	10	125

=== Penalty kicks ===
Includes only penalty kicks taken during matches.

Rank	Pos.	No.	Player	Série A	Copa do Brasil	Libertadores	Carioca	Other (Note: Includes Supercopa do Brasil, Recopa Sudamericana and FIFA Club World Cup.)	Total
1	FW	10	(Brazil) Gabriel Barbosa	4 / 5	1 / 2	–	0 / 1	3 / 3	8 / 11
2	FW	9	(Brazil) Pedro	4 / 4	1 / 1	–	1 / 1	–	6 / 6
3	MF	14	(Uruguay) Giorgian de Arrascaeta	–	1 / 1	–	–	–	1 / 1
Total				8 / 9	3 / 4	0 / 0	1 / 2	3 / 3	15 / 18

=== Assists ===
Rank	Pos.	No.	Player	Série A	Copa do Brasil	Libertadores	Carioca	Other (Note: Includes Supercopa do Brasil, Recopa Sudamericana and FIFA Club World Cup.)	Total
1	MF	14	(Uruguay) Giorgian de Arrascaeta	6	2	2	2	0	12
2	MF	20	(Brazil) Gerson	8	1	1	1	0	11
3	FW	11	(Brazil) Everton	5	1	0	3	1	10
4	MF	7	(Brazil) Éverton Ribeiro	4	0	1	1	1	7
4	DF	6	(Brazil) Ayrton Lucas	3	1	0	2	1	7
6	MF	5	(Chile) Erick Pulgar	3	0	2	0	0	5
7	FW	9	(Brazil) Pedro	0	0	1	3	0	4
7	FW	10	(Brazil) Gabriel Barbosa	1	1	1	1	0	4
7	DF	34	(Brazil) Matheuzinho	0	0	0	3	1	4
10	FW	31	(Brazil) Marinho	0	0	2	1	0	3
11	DF	4	(Brazil) Léo Pereira	1	1	0	0	0	2
11	DF	15	(Brazil) Fabrício Bruno	1	1	0	0	0	2
11	MF	29	(Brazil) Victor Hugo	2	0	0	0	0	2
11	MF	32	(Chile) Arturo Vidal	0	2	0	0	0	2
11	DF	16	(Brazil) Filipe Luís	1	0	0	1	0	2
11	FW	27	(Brazil) Bruno Henrique	1	1	0	0	0	2
17	DF	23	(Brazil) David Luiz	1	0	0	0	0	1
17	MF	29	(Brazil) Victor Hugo	1	0	0	0	0	1
17	DF	30	(Brazil) Pablo	0	0	1	0	0	1
17	FW	31	(Brazil) Luiz Araújo	1	0	0	0	0	1
17	FW	40	(Brazil) Thiago Fernandes^{†}	0	0	0	1	0	1
17	DF	43	(Brazil) Wesley França	1	0	0	0	0	1
17	FW	46	(Brazil) Mateusão^{†}	0	0	0	1	0	1
Total				40	11	11	20	4	86

=== Clean sheets ===
Rank	No.	Player	Série A	Copa do Brasil	Libertadores	Carioca	Other (Note: Includes Supercopa do Brasil, Recopa Sudamericana and FIFA Club World Cup.)	Total
1	25	(Brazil) Matheus Cunha	5 / 18	4 / 6	2 / 5	4 / 6	—	15 / 35
2	1	(Brazil) Santos	2 / 5	1 / 3	1 / 3	3 / 9	1 / 5	8 / 25
2	17	(Argentina) Agustín Rossi	8 / 15	0 / 1	0 / 0	0 / 0	0 / 0	8 / 16
Total			15 / 38	5 / 10	3 / 8	7 / 15	1 / 5	31 / 76

=== Penalty kick saves ===
Includes only penalty kicks saves during matches.

Rank	No.	Player	Série A	Copa do Brasil	Libertadores	Carioca	Other (Note: Includes Supercopa do Brasil, Recopa Sudamericana and FIFA Club World Cup.)	Total
1	1	(Brazil) Santos	0 / 1	—	—	2 / 2	1 / 4	3 / 7
2	25	(Brazil) Matheus Cunha	1 / 4	—	—	—	—	1 / 4
3	17	(Argentina) Agustín Rossi	0 / 2	—	—	—	—	0 / 2
Total			1 / 7	0 / 0	0 / 0	2 / 2	1 / 4	4 / 13

=== Season records ===
==== Individual ====
- Most matches played in the season in all competitions: 65 – Ayrton Lucas
- Most League matches played in the season: 35 – Wesley França, Ayrton Lucas
- Most matches played as starter in the season in all competitions: 61 – Fabrício Bruno
- Most League matches played as starter in the season: 34 – Fabrício Bruno
- Most matches played as substitute in the season in all competitions: 33 – Everton
- Most League matches played as substitute in the season: 18 – Victor Hugo
- Most goals in the season in all competitions: 35 – Pedro
- Most League goals in the season: 13 – Pedro
- Most clean sheets in the season in all competitions: 15 – Matheus Cunha
- Most League clean sheets in the season: 8 – Agustín Rossi
- Most goals scored in a match: 4
  - Pedro vs Maringá, Copa do Brasil, 27 April 2023
- Goals in consecutive matches in all competitions: 5 – Pedro, 28 January 2023 to 15 February 2023
- Goals in consecutive League matches: 3 – Pedro, 1 November 2023 to 15 November 2023
- Fastest goal: 24 seconds
  - Matheus Gonçalves vs Botafogo, Campeonato Carioca, 25 February 2023
- Hat-tricks: 1 – Pedro
- Youngest goalscorer: Lorran – 16 years, 204 days (against Bangu, Campeonato Carioca, 24 January 2023)
- Oldest goalscorer: David Luiz – 36 years, 21 days (against Bahia, Campeonato Brasileiro Série A, 13 May 2023)
- Most assists in the season in all competitions: 12 – Giorgian de Arrascaeta
- Most League assists in the season: 8 – Gerson
- Most assists in a match: 3
  - Gerson vs Santos, Série A, 25 June 2023
- Assists in consecutive matches in all competitions: 3 – Everton, Giorgian de Arrascaeta, Erick Pulgar
- Assists in consecutive League matches: 3 – Everton, Erick Pulgar

==== Team ====
- Biggest home win in all competitions:
  - 8–2 vs Maringá, Copa do Brasil, 27 April 2023
- Biggest League home win:
  - 3–0 vs Coritiba, Série A, 16 April 2023
  - 3–0 vs Grêmio, Série A, 11 June 2023
  - 3–0 vs Palmeiras, Série A, 8 November 2023
- Biggest away win in all competitions:
  - 4–1 vs Vasco da Gama, Série A, 5 June 2023
  - 3–0 vs América Mineiro, Série A, 26 November 2023
- Biggest League away win:
  - 4–1 vs Vasco da Gama, Série A, 5 June 2023
  - 3–0 vs América Mineiro, Série A, 26 November 2023
- Biggest home loss in all competitions:
  - 0–3 vs Athletico Paranaense, Série A, 13 September 2023
  - 0–3 vs Atlético Mineiro, Série A, 29 November 2023
- Biggest League home loss:
  - 0–3 vs Athletico Paranaense, Série A, 13 September 2023
  - 0–3 vs Atlético Mineiro, Série A, 29 November 2023
- Biggest away loss in all competitions:
  - 0–4 vs Red Bull Bragantino, Série A, 22 June 2023
- Biggest League away loss:
  - 0–4 vs Red Bull Bragantino, Série A, 22 June 2023
- Highest scoring match in all competitions:
  - 8–2 vs Maringá, Copa do Brasil, 27 April 2023
- Highest scoring League match:
  - 2–3 vs Botafogo, Série A, 30 April 2023
  - 3–2 vs Bahia, Série A, 13 May 2023
  - 4–1 vs Vasco da Gama, Série A, 5 June 2023
  - 3–2 vs Santos, Série A, 25 June 2023
  - 3–2 vs Coritiba, Série A, 20 August 2023
- Longest winning run in all competitions: 4 consecutive match(es)
  - 1 June 2023 to 11 June 2023
- Longest League winning run: 3 consecutive match(es)
  - 10 May 2023 to 21 May 2023
- Longest unbeaten run in all competitions: 11 consecutive match(es)
  - 25 June 2023 to 3 August 2023
- Longest League unbeaten run: 6 consecutive match(es)
  - 10 May 2023 to 11 June 2023
  - 25 June 2023 to 29 July 2023
- Longest losing run in all competitions: 3 consecutive match(es)
  - 5 April 2023 to 13 April 2023
- Longest League losing run: 3 consecutive match(es)
  - 23 April 2023 to 7 May 2023
- Longest without win run in all competitions: 4 consecutive match(es)
  - 13 September 2023 to 24 September 2023
- Longest without League win run: 3 consecutive match(es)
  - 23 April 2023 to 7 May 2023
  - 8 July 2023 to 22 July 2023
- Longest scoring run in all competitions: 11 consecutive match(es)
  - 30 September 2023 to 26 November 2023
- Longest League scoring run: 11 consecutive match(es)
  - 30 September 2023 to 26 November 2023
- Longest without scoring run in all competitions: 3 consecutive match(es)
  - 13 September 2023 to 20 September 2023
- Longest League without scoring run: 2 consecutive match(es)
  - 13 September 2023 to 20 September 2023
- Longest conceding goals run in all competitions: 6 consecutive match(es)
  - 23 April 2023 to 7 May 2023
- Longest League conceding goals run: 5 consecutive match(es)
  - 22 July 2023 to 20 August 2023
- Longest without conceding goals run in all competitions: 2 consecutive match(es)
  - 18 January 2023 to 21 January 2023
  - 25 February 2023 to 28 February 2023
  - 16 May 2023 to 21 May 2023
  - 19 October 2023 to 22 October 2023
  - 5 November 2023 to 8 November 2023
  - 23 November 2023 to 26 November 2023
- Longest League without conceding goals run: 2 consecutive match(es)
  - 19 October 2023 to 22 October 2023
  - 5 November 2023 to 8 November 2023
  - 23 November 2023 to 26 November 2023

=== National Team statistics ===
Appearances and goals while playing for Flamengo.

No.	Pos.	Name	Nat. Team	Friendlies		FIFA WCQ		Total	
No.	Pos.	Name	Nat. Team	Apps	Goals	Apps	Goals	Apps	Goals
2	DF	Guillermo Varela	Uruguay	2	0	—		2	0
5	MF	Erick Pulgar	Chile	2	0	5	0	7	0
6	DF	Ayrton Lucas	Brazil	2	0	—		2	0
9	FW	Pedro	Brazil	2	0	—		2	0
14	MF	Giorgian de Arrascaeta	Uruguay	0	0	2	0	2	0
25	GK	Matheus Cunha	Brazil U23	1	0	—		1	0
20	MF	Gerson	Brazil	—		1	0	1	0
32	MF	Arturo Vidal	Chile	3	0	—		3	0

=== Attendance ===
Includes all competition home matches in the 2023 season. Attendances recorded represent actual gate attendance, not paid attendance.

Campeonato Carioca
Stadium	Matches	Average	Highest attendance	Lowest attendance
Maracanã	8	49,915	69,020	27,312
Total	8	49,915	399,321	
Copa do Brasil
Stadium	Matches	Average	Highest attendance	Lowest attendance
Maracanã	5	64,579	69,978	53,753
Total	5	64,579	322,896	
Recopa Sudamericana
Stadium	Matches	Average	Highest attendance	Lowest attendance
Maracanã	1	71,411	71,411	71,411
Total	1	71,411	71,411	
Libertadores
Stadium	Matches	Average	Highest attendance	Lowest attendance
Maracanã	4	60,712	67,066	48,895
Total	4	60,712	242,848	
Série A
Stadium	Matches	Average	Highest attendance	Lowest attendance
Maracanã	17	59,244	69,473	42,848
Estádio Kléber Andrade	1	20,670	20,670	20,670
Arena BRB Mané Garrincha	1	64,708	64,708	64,708
Total	19	57,501	1.092.515	
Season total	37	57,541	2.129,061	
