= Ramon (footballer, born 2001) =

Brazilian footballer

Personal information
- Full name: Ramon Ramos Limas
- Date of birth: 13 March 2001 (age 25)
- Place of birth: São João de Meriti, Brazil
- Height: 1.79 m (5 ft 10 in)
- Position: Left-back

Team information
- Current team: Vitória (on loan from Internacional)
- Number: 13

Youth career
- –2016: Nova Iguaçu
- 2016–2019: Flamengo

Senior career*
| Years | Team | Apps | (Gls) |
| 2018–2023 | Flamengo | 19 | (0) |
| 2022 | → Red Bull Bragantino (loan) | 15 | (0) |
| 2023–2025 | Olympiacos | 9 | (0) |
| 2023–2024 | → Espanyol (loan) | 13 | (0) |
| 2024 | → Cuiabá (loan) | 30 | (2) |
| 2025– | Internacional | 9 | (0) |
| 2025– | → Vitória (loan) | 33 | (1) |
- * Club domestic league appearances and goals as of 8 April 2026

Ramon Ramos Limas (born 13 March 2001), commonly known as Ramon, is a Brazilian professional footballer who plays as a left-back for Vitória, on loan from Internacional.

== Career ==
=== Flamengo ===
Born in São João de Meriti, Rio de Janeiro, Ramon joined Nova Iguaçu's youth setup at the age of 9. In March 2017, he moved to Flamengo and was assigned to the under-17 team.

Ramon made his first team debut with Flamengo on 17 January 2018, starting in a 2–0 Campeonato Carioca away win over Volta Redonda, as his side only fielded youth team players. He started to feature more regularly with the main squad in 2020, and renewed his contract until 2025 on 6 October of that year.

==== Red Bull Bragantino (loan) ====
On 8 April 2022, Flamengo loaned Ramon to fellow top tier side Red Bull Bragantino until 31 December. Ramon had a total of 19 appearances in all competitions, 9 of those as a starter.

=== Olympiacos ===
On 19 January 2023 was announced Ramon's transfer to Olympiacos, the Greek side agreed to pay a €1.5m transfer fee and Flamengo kept 30% of a future transfer.

==== Espanyol (loan) ====
On 26 August 2023, after being rarely used, Ramon was loaned to Segunda División for the 2023–24 season.

== Career statistics ==
=== Club ===
As of 19 January 2023.

| Club | Season | League | | | State League | | Cup | | Continental | | Other | | Total | |
| Club | Season | Division | Apps | Goals | Apps | Goals | Apps | Goals | Apps | Goals | Apps | Goals | Apps | Goals |
|---|---|---|---|---|---|---|---|---|---|---|---|---|---|---|
| Flamengo | 2018 | Série A | 0 | 0 | 2 (Note: Appearance(s) in Campeonato Carioca.) | 0 | 0 | 0 | 0 | 0 | — | | 2 | 0 |
| Flamengo | 2019 | Série A | 0 | 0 | 0 | 0 | 0 | 0 | 0 | 0 | — | | 0 | 0 |
| Flamengo | 2020 | Série A | 4 | 0 | 4 | 0 | 1 | 0 | 3 (Note: Appearance(s) in Copa Libertadores.) | 0 | — | | 12 | 0 |
| Flamengo | 2021 | Série A | 12 | 0 | 5 | 0 | 3 | 0 | 4 | 0 | — | | 16 | 0 |
| Flamengo | 2023 | Série A | — | | 1 | 0 | — | | — | | — | | 1 | 0 |
| Total | | | 16 | 0 | 12 | 0 | 4 | 0 | 7 | 0 | 0 | 0 | 39 | 0 |
| Red Bull Bragantino (loan) | 2022 | Série A | 15 | 0 | — | | 0 | 0 | 4 | 0 | — | | 19 | 0 |
| Career total | | | 31 | 0 | 12 | 0 | 4 | 0 | 11 | 0 | 0 | 0 | 58 | 0 |

== Honours ==
Flamengo

- Campeonato Brasileiro Série A: 2020
- Campeonato Carioca: 2019, 2020, 2021

Internacional

- Campeonato Gaúcho: 2025
