= Wesley França =

Brazilian footballer (born 2003)

Wesley
Personal information
- Full name: Wesley Vinícius França Lima
- Date of birth: 6 September 2003 (age 23)
- Place of birth: São Luís, Maranhão, Brazil
- Height: 1.78 m (5 ft 10 in)
- Positions: Right-back; left-back

Team information
- Current team: Roma
- Number: 43

Youth career
- 2018: Figueirense
- 2019–2020: Atlético Tubarão
- 2021–2023: Flamengo

Senior career*
Years	Team	Apps	(Gls)
2021	Atlético Tubarão	0	(0)
2021–2025	Flamengo	78	(2)
2025–	Roma	41	(5)

International career^{‡}
2025–	Brazil	8	(0)
- * Club domestic league appearances and goals as of 23:15, 21 November 2026 (UTC) ‡ National team caps and goals as of 6 June 2026

Wesley Vinícius França Lima (born 6 September 2003), known as Wesley (Brazilian Portuguese: [ˈwɛslej]), is a Brazilian professional footballer who plays as a right-back or left-back for Serie A club Roma and the Brazil national team.

== Early life ==
Born in São Luís, Maranhão, Wesley moved to Florianópolis, Santa Catarina at the age of two. He began his career with local side Clube Avante, and subsequently had a spell at ASCD Triunfo.

Rejected in several trials at the age of ten, Wesley impressed in a Real Madrid summer camp in Floranópolis in 2016, and joined the youth categories of Figueirense at the age of 15. He only spent five months at the latter before the club closed their youth setup, and subsequently moved to Atlético Tubarão.

== Club career ==
=== Early career ===
Initially a member of Tubarão's under-17 team, Wesley made his senior debut with the club on 13 January 2021, playing the last 12 minutes of a 3–0 home loss to Joinville, for the 2020 Copa Santa Catarina. He featured in a further four matches in the competition, as the club was eliminated in the group stage.

=== Flamengo ===
In April 2021, Atlético Tubarão announced Wesley's transfer to Flamengo, initially for the youth setup. Regularly used in the under-20 squad, he made his first team – and Série A – debut on 9 December, starting in a 2–0 away loss to Atlético Goianiense.

Wesley returned to the under-20s for the 2022 season, and had a loan to Barcelona rejected in January 2023. He then overtook Guillermo Varela in the pecking order, and became a regular starter under head coach Jorge Sampaoli, scoring his first senior goal on 8 June 2023, in a 2–1 Copa Libertadores home win over Racing Club.

On 11 July 2024, Wesley renewed his contract with Fla until December 2028.

=== Roma ===
On 28 July 2025, Wesley signed a five-year contract with Roma in Italy. He scored on his competitive debut for the club during matchday 1 of the Serie A, in a 1–0 win against Bologna.

== International career ==
On 6 March 2025, Wesley was called up to the Brazil national team by head coach Dorival Júnior for two 2026 FIFA World Cup qualifiers against Colombia and Argentina. He made his full international debut on 20 March, replacing Vanderson in a 2–1 win over the former at the Estádio Nacional Mané Garrincha.

On 18 May 2026, Wesley was included in Carlo Ancelotti's 26-man squad for the 2026 FIFA World Cup. He would have become the first player from Maranhão to appear in a World Cup for Brazil, but was forced to withdraw after suffering an injury in a pre-tournament friendly match with Egypt.

== Career statistics ==
=== Club ===
As of match played 21 November 2026

Appearances and goals by club, season and competition
Club	Season	League			State league (Note: Includes Campeonato Carioca)		National cup (Note: Includes Copa do Brasil, Coppa Italia)		Continental		Other		Total	
Club	Season	Division	Apps	Goals	Apps	Goals	Apps	Goals	Apps	Goals	Apps	Goals	Apps	Goals
Atlético Tubarão	2020	Série D	0	0	0	0	—		—		5 (Note: Appearances in Copa Santa Catarina)	0	5	0
Flamengo	2021	Série A	1	0	0	0	0	0	0	0	0	0	1	0
Flamengo	2022	Série A	0	0	2	0	0	0	0	0	0	0	2	0
Flamengo	2023	Série A	35	1	3	0	9	0	7 (Note: Appearances in Copa Libertadores)	1	0	0	54	2
Flamengo	2024	Série A	31	0	6	0	9	0	5	0	—		51	0
Flamengo	2025	Série A	11	1	8	1	1	0	5	0	3 (Note: One appearance in Supercopa do Brasil, two appearances in FIFA Club World Cup)	0	28	2
Flamengo	Total		78	2	19	1	19	0	17	1	3	0	136	4
Roma	2025–26	Serie A	30	5	—		1	0	8 (Note: Appearances in UEFA Europa League)	0	—		39	5
Roma	2026–27	Serie A	11	0	—		0	0	4 (Note: Appearances in UEFA Champions League)	0	—		15	0
Roma	Total		41	5	—		1	0	12	0	—		54	5
Career total			119	7	19	1	20	0	29	1	8	0	195	9

=== International ===
As of match played 6 June 2026

Appearances and goals by national team and year
National team	Year	Apps	Goals
Brazil	2025	5	0
Brazil	2026	3	0
Total		8	0

== Honours ==
Flamengo

- Copa Libertadores: 2022
- Copa do Brasil: 2024
- Supercopa do Brasil: 2025
- Campeonato Carioca: 2024, 2025

Individual

- Campeonato Brasileiro Série A Team of the Year: 2024
- Copa do Brasil Team of the Season: 2024
- Campeonato Carioca Team of the Year: 2025
- EA Sports FC Serie A Team of the Season: 2025–26
