= Bira (footballer) =

Brazilian footballer (born 1969)

Personal information
- Full name: Ubiraci Ferreira dos Santos
- Date of birth: 27 April 1969 (age 57)
- Place of birth: São João de Meriti, Brazil
- Height: 1.73 m (5 ft 8 in)
- Position: Forward

Senior career*
Years	Team	Apps	(Gls)
1988	América-RJ	11	(2)
1993–1994	Atlético Mineiro	8	(0)
1996–1997	Beira-Mar	16	(1)
1997–1998	América-RJ		
1998–1999	Alverca	3	(0)
1999–2000	Trikala		
2000–2003	Paniliakos	41	(6)
- * Club domestic league appearances and goals

Ubiraci Ferreira dos Santos , commonly known as Bira , (born 27 April 1969) is a former Brazilian footballer.

== Club career ==
Bira played for América-RJ and Atlético Mineiro in the Campeonato Brasileiro Série A. He played three seasons for Paniliakos in the Super League Greece. He also had a brief spell in Portugal with Alverca.
