= Santiago Ocampos =

Paraguayan footballer (born 2002)

Personal information
- Full name: Santiago Ocampos Ibarra
- Date of birth: 22 January 2002 (age 24)
- Place of birth: Paraguay
- Height: 1.78 m (5 ft 10 in)
- Position: Right back

Team information
- Current team: Sportivo Luqueño
- Number: 22

Youth career
- –2018: Sportivo Luqueño
- 2018–2020: Juventus
- 2022–2023: Flamengo

Senior career*
Years	Team	Apps	(Gls)
2020–2021	Beitar Jerusalem	18	(0)
2022–2024	Flamengo	0	(0)
2024	Operário Ferroviário	11	(0)
2025–	Sportivo Luqueño	10	(0)

International career
2019	Paraguay U17	8	(0)
- * Club domestic league appearances and goals as of 13 August 2025

Santiago Ocampos Ibarra (born 22 January 2002) is a Paraguayan professional footballer who plays as a defender for Sportivo Luqueño. Besides Paraguay, he has played in Brazil, Italy, and Israel.

== Career ==
=== Juventus ===
At the age of 16, Ocampos joined the youth academy of Juventus, Italy's most successful club.

=== Beitar Jerusalem ===
In 2020, Ocampos signed for Beitar Jerusalem in Israel after receiving offers from Brazil, Mexico, the United States and almost joining a Portuguese side.

=== Flamengo ===
On 29 December 2021, after leaving Beitar Jerusalem, Ocampos signed with Flamengo a two-year deal until December 2023.

=== Operário Ferroviário ===
On 9 April, 2024 Flamengo released Ocampos to sign to sign with Campeonato Brasileiro Série B club Operário Ferroviário until December 2025.

== Career statistics ==
As of 27 June 2024

Club	Season	League			State League		Cup		Continental		Other		Total	
Club	Season	Division	Apps	Goals	Apps	Goals	Apps	Goals	Apps	Goals	Apps	Goals	Apps	Goals
Beitar Jerusalem	2020–21	Israeli Premier League	17	0	—		2	0	—		—		19	0
Beitar Jerusalem	2021–22	Israeli Premier League	1	0	—		2	0	—		—		3	0
Beitar Jerusalem	Total		18	0	0	0	4	0	0	0	0	0	22	0
Flamengo	2022	Série A	—		—		—		—		—		0	0
Flamengo	2023	Série A	—		—		—		—		—		0	0
Flamengo	2024	Série A	0	0	2 (Note: Appearance(s) in the Campeonato Carioca.)	0	—		0 (Note: Appearance(s) in the Copa Libertadores.)	0	—		2	0
Flamengo	Total		0	0	2	0	0	0	0	0	0	0	2	0
Operário Ferroviário	2024	Série B	6	0	—		—		—		—		6	0
Career total			24	0	2	0	4	0	0	0	0	0	30	0

== Honours ==
Flamengo

- Campeonato Carioca: 2024
