= Luciano Vieira =

Brazilian politician (born 1988)

- Official portrait, 2023

Member of the Chamber of Deputies
- Incumbent
- Assumed office 1 February 2023
- Constituency: Rio de Janeiro

Personal details
- Born: Luciano Vieira Mendes; 26 April 1988 (age 38) Rio de Janeiro, Brazil
- Party: PSDB (2025–present)
- Other political affiliations: DC (2018–2020); Avante (2020–2022); PL (2022–2024); Republicanos (2024–2025)
- Relatives: Léo Vieira (brother); Léo Vieira Filho (nephew)

Luciano Vieira Mendes (born 26 April 1988) is a Brazilian politician serving as a member of the Chamber of Deputies since 2023. He is the brother of Léo Vieira.
