= Léo Vieira Filho =

Brazilian politician (born 1998)

Member of the Legislative Assembly of Rio de Janeiro
- Incumbent
- Assumed office 1 February 2027

Personal details
- Born: 5 January 1998 (age 28)
- Party: Brazilian Social Democracy Party (since 2026)
- Parent: Léo Vieira (father)
- Relatives: Luciano Vieira (uncle)

Leonardo Braga Vieira Mendes (born 5 January 1998), better known as Léo Vieira Filho, is a Brazilian politician who was elected member of the Legislative Assembly of Rio de Janeiro in 2026. He is the son of Léo Vieira and the nephew of Luciano Vieira.
