= Léo Vieira (politician) =

Brazilian politician (born 1974)

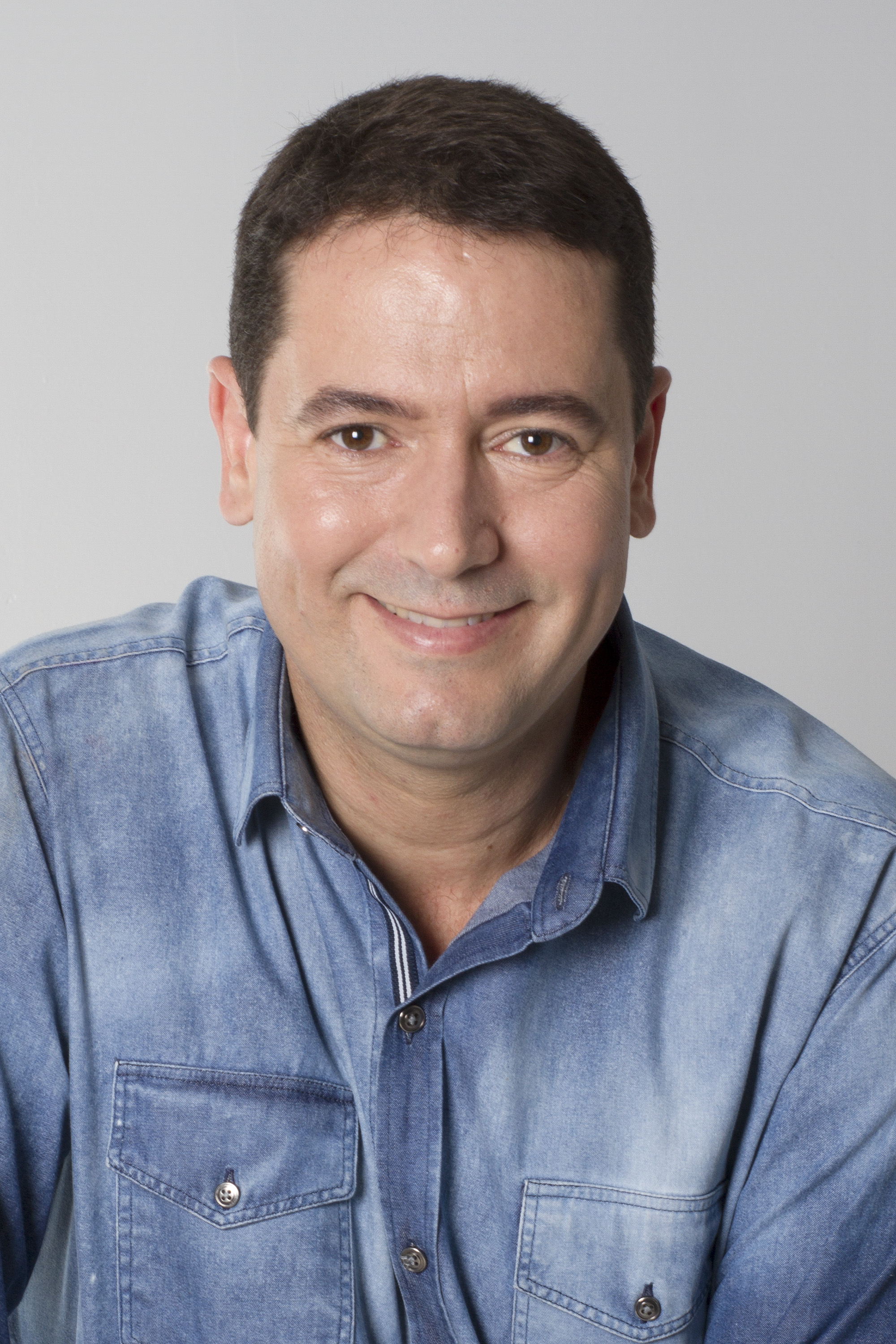
- Vieira in 2018

Mayor of São João de Meriti
- Incumbent
- Assumed office 1 January 2025
- Preceded by: João Ferreira Neto

Personal details
- Born: 15 August 1974 (age 52)
- Party: Republicans (since 2024)
- Children: Léo Vieira Filho
- Relatives: Luciano Vieira (brother)

Léo Vieira (born 15 August 1974) is a Brazilian politician serving as mayor of São João de Meriti since 2025. From 2019 to 2024, he was a member of the Legislative Assembly of Rio de Janeiro. He is the brother of Luciano Vieira.
