= Guillermo Varela =

Uruguayan footballer (born 1993)

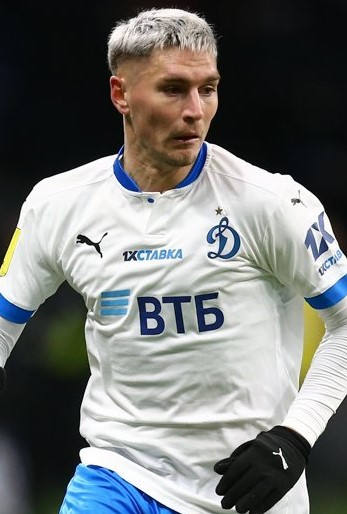
- Varela playing for Dynamo Moscow in 2022

Personal information
- Full name: Guillermo Varela Olivera
- Date of birth: 24 March 1993 (age 33)
- Place of birth: Montevideo, Uruguay
- Height: 1.73 m (5 ft 8 in)
- Position: Right-back

Team information
- Current team: Flamengo
- Number: 2

Youth career
- –2011: Peñarol

Senior career*
| Years | Team | Apps | (Gls) |
| 2011–2013 | Peñarol | 1 | (0) |
| 2013–2017 | Manchester United | 4 | (0) |
| 2014–2015 | → Real Madrid B (loan) | 33 | (1) |
| 2016–2017 | → Eintracht Frankfurt (loan) | 7 | (0) |
| 2017–2019 | Peñarol | 22 | (0) |
| 2019–2021 | Copenhagen | 35 | (0) |
| 2020–2021 | → Dynamo Moscow (loan) | 17 | (0) |
| 2021–2023 | Dynamo Moscow | 25 | (0) |
| 2022–2023 | → Flamengo (loan) | 13 | (0) |
| 2023– | Flamengo | 79 | (2) |

International career^{‡}
| 2012–2013 | Uruguay U20 | 29 | (0) |
| 2017– | Uruguay | 34 | (0) |
Medal record
Men's football
Representing Uruguay
Copa América
| Third place | 2024 United States |
- * Club domestic league appearances and goals as of 23:00, 24 May 2026 (UTC) ‡ National team caps and goals as of 01:30, 14 November 2026 (UTC)

Guillermo Varela Olivera ([ɡiˈʝeɾmo βaˈɾela oliˈβeɾa]; born 24 March 1993) is a Uruguayan professional footballer who plays as a right-back for Campeonato Brasileiro Série A club Flamengo and the Uruguay national team.

Varela began his career with Peñarol, in his home town of Montevideo, before joining Manchester United in 2013. He made 11 first-team appearances for United and spent time on loan at Real Madrid's reserve team, Real Madrid Castilla, and at Eintracht Frankfurt, before rejoining Peñarol in 2017. Varela won two Uruguayan Primera División titles with Peñarol, before returning to Europe in January 2019 when he signed for Danish club Copenhagen. He made 53 appearances for Copenhagen and helped them win the 2018–19 Danish Superliga. In October 2020, he joined Russian club Dynamo Moscow on a loan deal, which was made permanent in July 2021. He returned to South American football in July 2022, when he joined Flamengo on loan. In July 2023, Varela joined Flamengo on a permanent deal.

Varela was a member of Uruguay's under-20 team that was runners-up in the 2013 FIFA U-20 World Cup. He made his senior international debut in November 2017 and has played at three FIFA World Cups, in 2018, 2022 and 2026.

== Club career ==
=== Peñarol ===
Born in Montevideo, Varela started his career with his hometown club Peñarol and made his senior debut on 5 June 2011, in a 1–0 home defeat against Racing Club de Montevideo, on the last matchday of Uruguayan Primera División.

=== Manchester United ===
In May 2013, Varela went on a two-week trial with Manchester United after an impressive performance at the 2013 South American Youth Championship. On 7 June, Varela announced he was having a medical, and on 11 June, United completed his signing on a five-year contract, becoming the first signing of new manager David Moyes.

==== Loan to Real Madrid Castilla ====
In September 2014, Varela joined Real Madrid reserve side Real Madrid Castilla for a season-long loan. He was, however, included in the 2014–15 UEFA Champions League squad for the first-team and he was given the squad number 28. He made 33 appearances and scored once, when he was set up by Martin Ødegaard in a 4–0 win over Barakaldo on 21 February 2015, at the Estadio Alfredo Di Stéfano in that season's Segunda División B.

==== Return to United and loan to Eintracht Frankfurt ====
After returning to United, Varela was included in their squad for the group stage of the 2015–16 UEFA Champions League. He made his debut on 5 December 2015, as a half-time substitute for Paddy McNair in a goalless Premier League draw against West Ham United at Old Trafford. Three days later, Varela made his first start and Champions League debut in the 2015–16 UEFA Champions League, playing the full 90 minutes in a 3–2 defeat to Wolfsburg. On 25 February 2016, in a Europa League Round of 32 return leg against FC Midtjylland, he assisted on the second of the two goals Marcus Rashford scored on his senior debut. On 19 April, Varela scored an injury-time winner to win Manchester United Under-21s the 2015–16 U21 Premier League title.

Upon the arrival of José Mourinho as United manager in 2016, Varela came on as a substitute in Mourinho's first match in charge of the team, a 2–0 friendly win away to Wigan Athletic. However, he was not included in Mourinho's squad for the club's summer tour of China, and on 23 July, Varela joined German club Eintracht Frankfurt on a season-long loan deal.

Frankfurt coach Niko Kovač revealed at the end of the season that Varela was expected to play in the 2017 DFB-Pokal Final and be given an extension, but these plans were abandoned after Varela defied the instructions of the club's training staff and got a tattoo, which later became inflamed. Because of this, and other disciplinary issues, Varela was suspended by the club, who said that they would not be attempting to extend his loan deal.

=== Return to Peñarol ===
On 12 August 2017, Varela returned to Peñarol on a permanent deal. He made his second debut for the club on 20 August 2017, in 4–0 win against El Tanque Sisley.

=== FC Copenhagen ===
On 20 December 2018, Danish Superliga team FC Copenhagen announced that Varela would join them in January 2019, on a deal until June 2023.

=== Dynamo Moscow ===
On 17 October 2020, he joined Russian Premier League club FC Dynamo Moscow on loan for the 2020–21 season.

On 17 July 2021, he moved to Dynamo Moscow on a permanent basis and signed a two-year contract with the club. He was voted player of the month by Dynamo fans for October 2021.

=== Flamengo ===
On 30 July 2022, Flamengo signed Varela on loan from Dynamo Moscow until 31 May 2023.

On 12 January 2023, Flamengo announced that Varela had signed a pre-contract for a permanent deal starting at the end of his contract with Dynamo Moscow on 1 July 2023.

== International career ==
Varela made 29 appearances for the Uruguay under-20 team. He played for Uruguay at the 2013 FIFA U-20 World Cup, where the team finished as runners-up to champions France.

On 5 March 2016, following his emergence into the Manchester United first-team, Varela received his first call-up to the Uruguay senior squad, for the World Cup qualifiers against Brazil and Peru later that same month.

In June 2018, Varela was named in Uruguay's final 23-man squad for the 2018 FIFA World Cup in Russia. He appeared in the opening two group stage matches, Uruguay's 1–0 victories over Egypt – on 15 June – and Saudi Arabia – on 20 June – which saw his side advance to the knock-out stages. Uruguay were eliminated from the tournament following a 2–0 defeat to eventual champions France in the quarter-finals on 6 July.

Varela was named in Uruguay's squad for the 2022 FIFA World Cup. He came on as a substitute in the 88th minute in Uruguay's first game of the tournament – against South Korea, replacing Facundo Pellistri.

In June 2024, Varela was named to Uruguay's squad for the 2024 Copa América. Uruguay reached the semi-finals of the tournament, losing 1–0 to a ten-man Colombia, Varela making a substitute appearance during the match, replacing the injured Rodrigo Bentancur in the first half; he was later shown a red card for violent conduct in the final minute of injury time of the second half. In the third-place play-off match, Uruguay defeated Canada 4–3 on penalties, following a 2–2 draw.

On 31 May 2026, Varela was named in Uruguay's 26-man squad for the 2026 FIFA World Cup.

== Career statistics ==
=== Club ===
As of match played 20 December 2024

Appearances and goals by club, season and competition
| Club | Season | League | | | State league | | National cup | | League cup | | Continental | | Other | | Total | |
| Club | Season | Division | Apps | Goals | Apps | Goals | Apps | Goals | Apps | Goals | Apps | Goals | Apps | Goals | Apps | Goals |
|---|---|---|---|---|---|---|---|---|---|---|---|---|---|---|---|---|
| Peñarol | 2010–11 | Uruguayan Primera División | 1 | 0 | — | | — | | — | | 0 | 0 | — | | 1 | 0 |
| Peñarol | 2011–12 | Uruguayan Primera División | 0 | 0 | — | | — | | — | | 0 | 0 | — | | 0 | 0 |
| Peñarol | 2012–13 | Uruguayan Primera División | 0 | 0 | — | | — | | — | | 0 | 0 | — | | 0 | 0 |
| Peñarol | Total | | 1 | 0 | — | | — | | — | | 0 | 0 | — | | 1 | 0 |
| Manchester United | 2013–14 | Premier League | 0 | 0 | — | | 0 | 0 | 0 | 0 | 0 | 0 | 0 | 0 | 0 | 0 |
| Manchester United | 2014–15 | Premier League | 0 | 0 | — | | 0 | 0 | 0 | 0 | — | | — | | 0 | 0 |
| Manchester United | 2015–16 | Premier League | 4 | 0 | — | | 3 | 0 | 0 | 0 | 4 (Note: One appearance in UEFA Champions League, three in UEFA Europa League) | 0 | — | | 11 | 0 |
| Manchester United | 2016–17 | Premier League | 0 | 0 | — | | 0 | 0 | 0 | 0 | 0 | 0 | 0 | 0 | 0 | 0 |
| Manchester United | Total | | 4 | 0 | — | | 3 | 0 | 0 | 0 | 4 | 0 | 0 | 0 | 11 | 0 |
| Real Madrid Castilla (loan) | 2014–15 | Segunda División B | 33 | 1 | — | | — | | — | | — | | — | | 33 | 1 |
| Eintracht Frankfurt (loan) | 2016–17 | Bundesliga | 7 | 0 | — | | 3 | 0 | — | | — | | — | | 10 | 0 |
| Peñarol | 2017 | Uruguayan Primera División | 11 | 0 | — | | — | | — | | — | | — | | 11 | 0 |
| Peñarol | 2018 | Uruguayan Primera División | 12 | 0 | — | | — | | — | | 6 (Note: Appearance(s) in Copa Libertadores) | 0 | 1 (Note: Appearance in Supercopa Uruguaya) | 0 | 19 | 0 |
| Peñarol | Total | | 23 | 0 | — | | — | | — | | 6 | 0 | 1 | 0 | 30 | 0 |
| Copenhagen | 2018–19 | Danish Superliga | 7 | 0 | — | | 0 | 0 | — | | 0 | 0 | — | | 7 | 0 |
| Copenhagen | 2019–20 | Danish Superliga | 27 | 0 | — | | 1 | 0 | — | | 15 (Note: Three appearances in UEFA Champions League, twelve in UEFA Europa League) | 0 | — | | 43 | 0 |
| Copenhagen | 2020–21 | Danish Superliga | 1 | 0 | — | | 0 | 0 | — | | 2 (Note: Appearances in UEFA Europa League) | 0 | — | | 3 | 0 |
| Copenhagen | Total | | 35 | 0 | — | | 1 | 0 | — | | 17 | 0 | — | | 53 | 0 |
| Dynamo Moscow (loan) | 2020–21 | Russian Premier League | 17 | 0 | — | | 2 | 0 | — | | — | | — | | 19 | 0 |
| Dynamo Moscow | 2021–22 | Russian Premier League | 24 | 0 | — | | 5 | 0 | — | | — | | — | | 29 | 0 |
| Dynamo Moscow | 2022–23 | Russian Premier League | 1 | 0 | — | | 0 | 0 | — | | — | | — | | 1 | 0 |
| Dynamo Moscow | Total | | 25 | 0 | — | | 5 | 0 | — | | — | | — | | 30 | 0 |
| Flamengo (loan) | 2022 | Série A | 5 | 0 | — | | 0 | 0 | — | | 1 | 0 | — | | 6 | 0 |
| Flamengo (loan) | 2023 | Série A | 1 | 0 | 7 (Note: Appearances in Campeonato Carioca) | 0 | 1 | 0 | — | | 2 | 0 | 4 (Note: One appearance in Supercopa do Brasil, one in FIFA Club World Cup, two in Recopa Sudamericana) | 0 | 15 | 0 |
| Flamengo (loan) | Total | | 6 | 0 | 7 | 0 | 1 | 0 | — | | 3 | 0 | 4 | 0 | 21 | 0 |
| Flamengo | 2023 | Série A | 4 | 0 | — | | 2 | 0 | — | | 0 | 0 | — | | 6 | 0 |
| Flamengo | 2024 | Série A | 18 | 1 | 12 | 1 | 7 | 0 | 0 | 0 | 9 | 0 | — | | 46 | 2 |
| Flamengo | 2025 | Série A | 20 | 0 | 9 | 1 | 4 | 0 | 0 | 0 | 12 | 1 | 6 | 0 | 51 | 2 |
| Total | | | 42 | 1 | 21 | 2 | 13 | 0 | — | | 21 | 1 | 4 | 0 | 103 | 4 |
| Career total | | | 175 | 2 | 28 | 2 | 33 | 0 | 0 | 0 | 51 | 1 | 5 | 0 | 311 | 5 |

=== International ===
As of match played 13 November 2026

Appearances and goals by national team and year
| National team | Year | Apps | Goals |
|---|---|---|---|
| Uruguay | 2017 | 1 | 0 |
| Uruguay | 2018 | 4 | 0 |
| Uruguay | 2022 | 7 | 0 |
| Uruguay | 2023 | 3 | 0 |
| Uruguay | 2024 | 6 (Note: Includes a Non-FIFA friendly played against the Basque Country, which is counted as an official match by the Uruguayan Football Association.) | 0 |
| Uruguay | 2025 | 5 | 0 |
| Uruguay | 2026 | 8 | 0 |
| Total | | 34 | 0 |

== Honours ==
Peñarol

- Uruguayan Primera División: 2017, 2018
- Supercopa Uruguaya: 2018

Copenhagen

- Danish Superliga: 2018–19

Flamengo

- FIFA Challenger Cup: 2025
- FIFA Derby of the Americas: 2025
- Copa Libertadores: 2022, 2025
- Campeonato Brasileiro Série A: 2025
- Copa do Brasil: 2024
- Supercopa do Brasil: 2025
- Campeonato Carioca: 2024, 2025

Uruguay

- Copa América third place: 2024

Individual

- Campeonato Carioca Team of the Year: 2024
- South American Team of the Year: 2025
- IFFHS Men's CONMEBOL Team: 2025
