= Ryan Luka =

Brazilian footballer

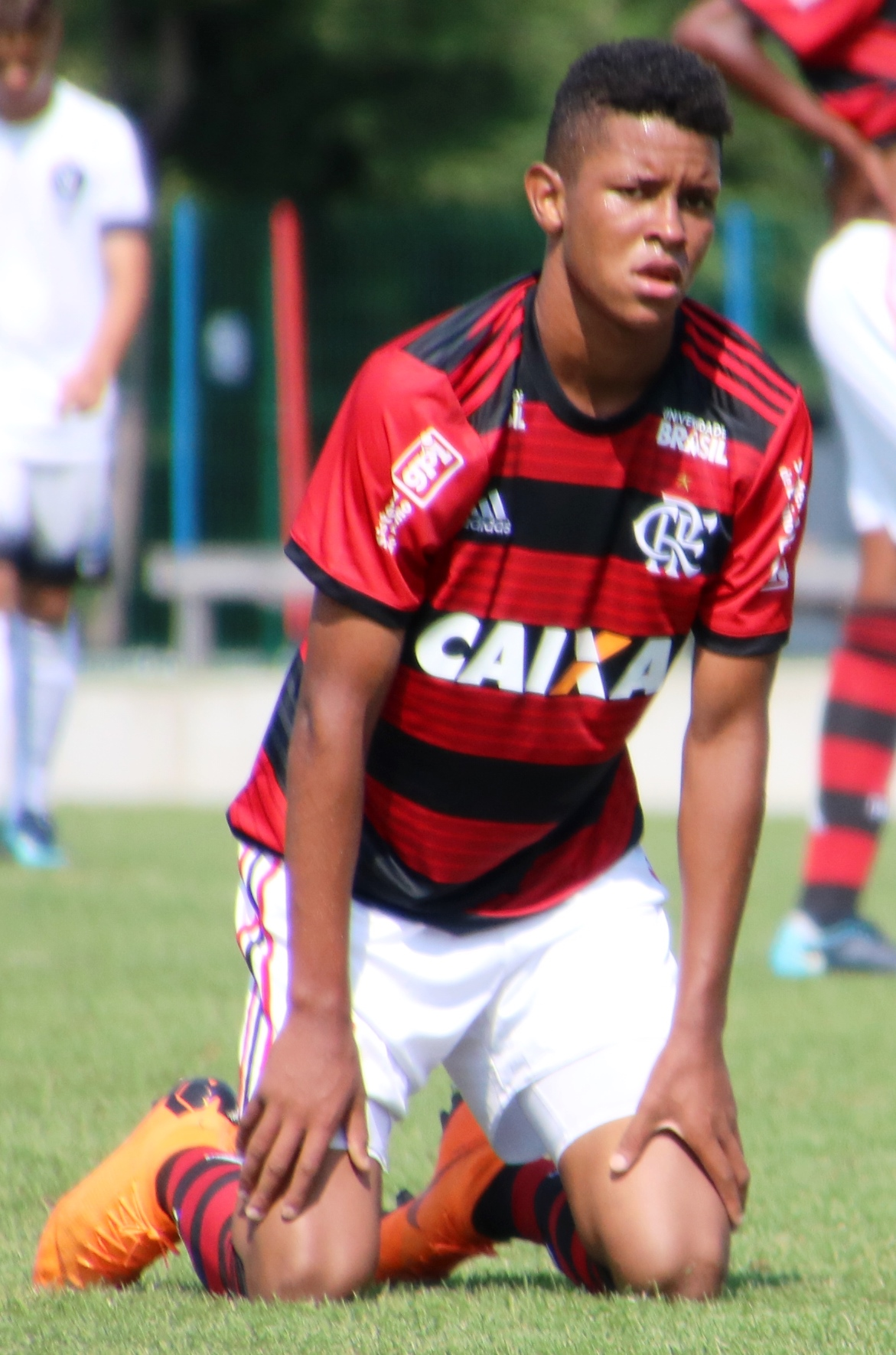
- Ryan Luka playing for Flamengo in 2018.

Personal information
- Full name: Ryan Luka Cordeiro de Souza
- Date of birth: 30 April 2003 (age 23)
- Place of birth: Além Paraíba, Brazil
- Height: 1.86 m (6 ft 1 in)
- Position: Forward

Team information
- Current team: Samgurali Tsqaltubo

Youth career
- 2016–2023: Flamengo

Senior career*
| Years | Team | Apps | (Gls) |
| 2021–2023 | Flamengo | 1 | (0) |
| 2023–2024 | Fortaleza | 0 | (0) |
| 2024– | Samgurali Tsqaltubo | 0 | (0) |
- * Club domestic league appearances and goals as of 16:29, 6 October 2024 (UTC)

Ryan Luka Cordeiro de Souza (born 30 April 2003), known as Ryan Luka, is a Brazilian footballer who plays as a forward for Samgurali Tsqaltubo.

== Club career ==
Born in Além Paraíba, Minas Gerais, Ryan Luka joined Flamengo's youth setup in 2016, aged 12. He made his first team – and Série A – debut on 13 June 2021, coming on as a late substitute for fellow youth graduate Rodrigo Muniz in a 2–0 home win against América Mineiro.

== Career statistics ==
As of 30 June 2021

| Club | Season | League | | | State League | | Cup | | Continental | | Other | | Total | |
| Club | Season | Division | Apps | Goals | Apps | Goals | Apps | Goals | Apps | Goals | Apps | Goals | Apps | Goals |
|---|---|---|---|---|---|---|---|---|---|---|---|---|---|---|
| Flamengo | 2021 | Série A | 1 | 0 | 0 | 0 | 0 | 0 | 0 | 0 | — | | 1 | 0 |
| Career total | | | 1 | 0 | 0 | 0 | 0 | 0 | 0 | 0 | 0 | 0 | 1 | 0 |
