= São João de Meriti =

- Municipality
- Municipality of São João de Meriti
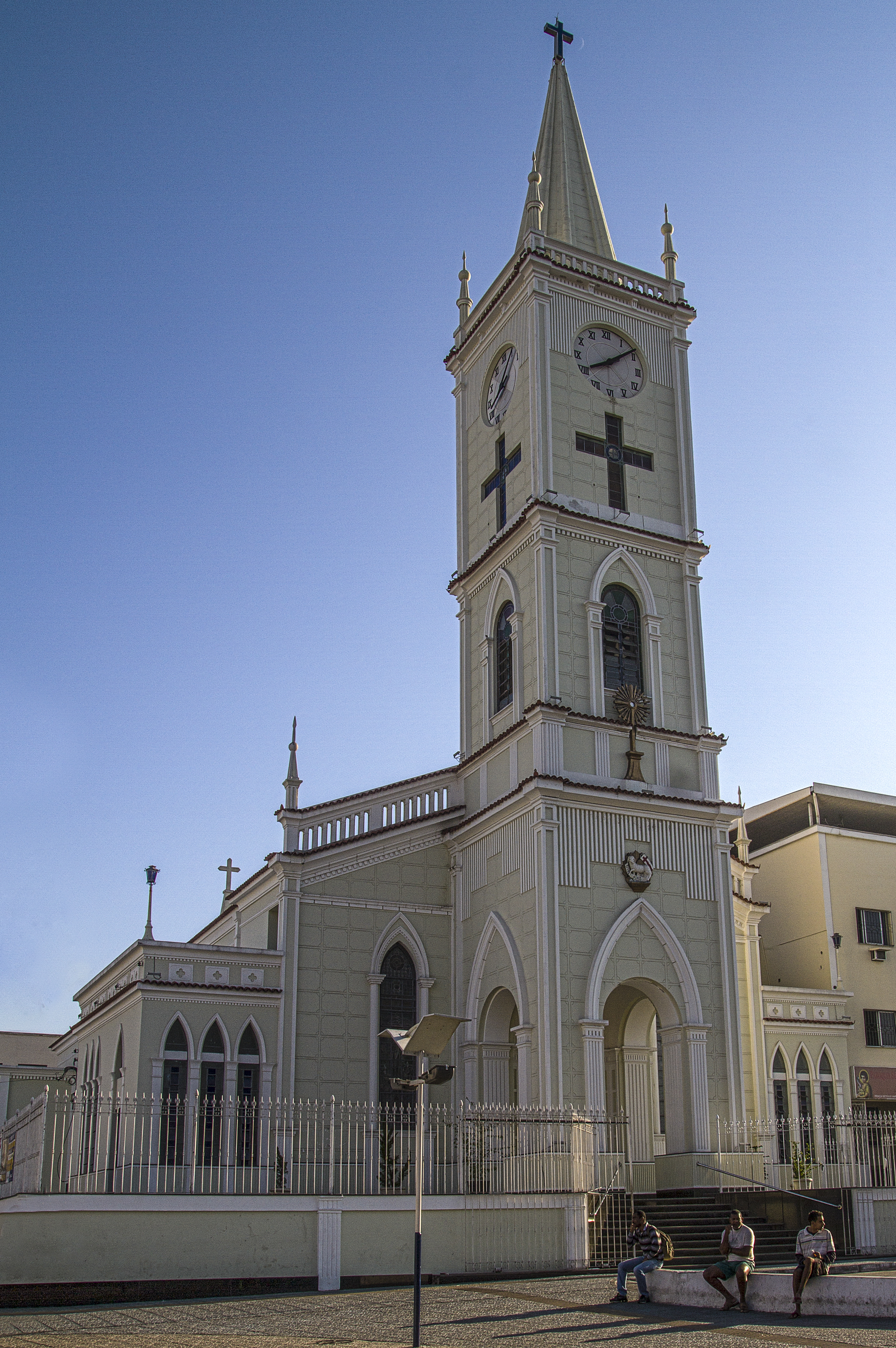
- Church of Saint John the Baptist

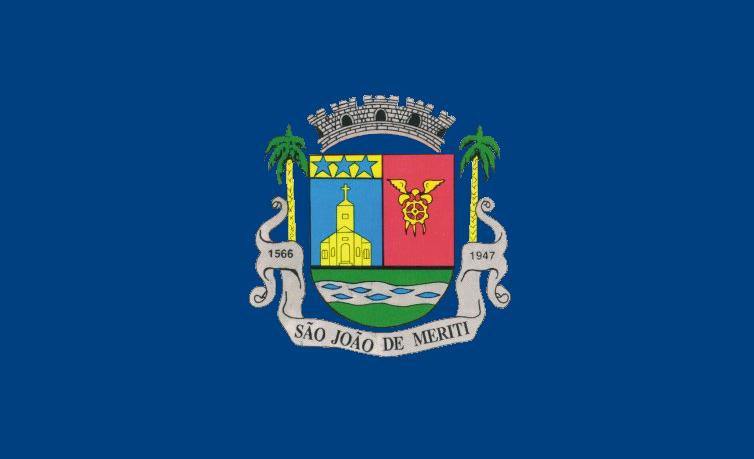
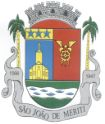
- Flag Coat of arms
- Nickname: Formigueiro das Américas ("Americas' Anthill")
- Location of São João de Meriti

- Location within Brazil
- Coordinates: 22°48′14″S 43°22′19″W
- Country: Brazil
- Region: Southeast
- State: Rio de Janeiro
- City Established: December 8, 1954

Government
  - Mayor: Léo Vieira (Republicans)
  - Demonym: meritiense

Area
  - Total: 34.838 km^{2} (13.451 sq mi)
- Elevation: 19 m (62 ft)

Population (2022)
  - Total: 440,962
  - Estimate (2025): 466,503
  - Density: 12,658/km^{2} (32,783/sq mi)
- Time zone: UTC−3 (BRT)

São João de Meriti (Portuguese pronunciation: [sɐ̃w ʒuˈɐ̃w dʒi meɾiˈtʃi, - miɾ-]) is a Brazilian municipality in the state of Rio de Janeiro. Its historical name was São João do Rio Meriti. Its population was 440,962 inhabitants in 2022, with an estimated population of 466,503 in 2025. It is located in the region of Baixada Fluminense, having 34.996 km^{2} (13.451 square miles).

The city is known as "Americas' Anthill", because its population density is one of the highest in the continent (13,185/km^{2} or 34,815/sq mi).

== History ==
The place we know today as São João de Meriti, cut by the rivers Sarapuí, Meriti and Pavuna, was known before as Freguesia de Meriti. In the 17th and 18th centuries, Meriti had many farms and chapels, being an important producer of corn, cassava, beans and sugar.

In 1833, the São João de Meriti village incorporated the Maxabomba village, now City of Nova Iguaçú. In 1947, São João de Meriti was elevated to the status of municipality.

It is considered a commuter town.

It has some commercial centers such as its downtown, Vilar dos Teles (ex-capital of jeans), Coelho da Rocha, São Mateus and Shopping Grande Rio mall.

Many poor districts surround these commercial centers and others lack proper sanitation, like Jardim Paraíso, close to Vilar dos Teles. Some districts like Vila Rosali are populated by the middle class.

Recently, the city has become an important cultural centre, being home to IPAHB and SESC. São João de Meriti is the hometown of the writer Lasana Lukata, volleyball player André Nascimento, actor Paulinho Gogó and the young André Mercury, nationally known for his performance on the Brazilian reality show Ídolos, when he sang his own song Casa da Colina (House on the Hill, in English), probably inspired by the homonym film. Meriti was also the hometown of João Cândido, the Black Admiral, one of the most prominent fighters in the defense of black people's rights. The footballer Bira was born here as well.

== Transport ==
São João de Meriti benefits from connecting other municipalities in Baixada Fluminense to Rio de Janeiro. The vast majority of buses leaving other cities in the Metropolitan Region for the capital pass through São João de Meriti, via Via Light and Rodovia Presidente Dutra, as well as passing through the city center and neighborhoods such as Vilar dos Teles and Coelho da Rocha.

There are numerous bus lines to neighborhoods in most municipalities in Baixada Fluminense and the capital (North Zone, Center and West Zone), as well as to the city of Niterói.

The city is crossed by two railways: the Supervia Belford Roxo branch line (a remnant of the old Estrada de Ferro Rio d'Ouro), a suburban train branch line that connects the city to the neighboring city of Belford Roxo, and the Auxiliary Line of the old Estrada de Ferro Central do Brasil, connecting the city to the city of Japeri, but currently focused on cargo transportation and with part of the line granted to MRS Logística. Both lines merge into one connecting the city with the capital of Rio de Janeiro.

== Territorial organization ==
São João de Meriti is administratively divided into 21 bairros (neighborhoods) and 3 distritos (districts).

Bairros
Agostinho Porto
Centro
Coelho da Rocha
Éden
Engenheiro Belford
Grande Rio
Jardim Meriti
Jardim Metrópole
Jardim Sumaré
Parque Alian
Parque Analândia
Parque Araruama
Parque Novo Rio
Parque Tietê
São Mateus
Tomazinho
Venda Velha
Vila Norma
Vila Rosali
Vilar dos Teles
Vilar Tiradentes

Distritos
Coelho da Rocha
São João de Meriti
São Mateus
