= Caio Barone =

Brazilian footballer (born 2006)

Personal information
- Full name: Caio Barone Albado
- Date of birth: 4 May 2006 (age 20)
- Place of birth: Taubaté, Brazil
- Height: 1.96 m (6 ft 5 in)
- Position: Goalkeeper

Team information
- Current team: Celta B
- Number: 13

Youth career
- 2016–2019: Santos
- 2019–2025: Flamengo

Senior career*
Years	Team	Apps	(Gls)
2025–	Celta B	1	(0)

International career
2023	Brazil U17		
- * Club domestic league appearances and goals as of 25 May 2026

Caio Barone Albado (born 4 May 2006) is a Brazilian professional footballer who plays as a goalkeeper for Spanish club Celta Fortuna. He also holds an Italian passport.

== Club career ==
Born in Taubaté, São Paulo, Barone joined Flamengo's youth sides in 2019, aged 13, after starting out at Santos. In August 2022, he signed his first professional contract with the club, and subsequently became a backup option to Dyogo Alves in the under-20 squad before renewing his link in December 2024.

On 16 July 2025, Barone joined La Liga side Celta Vigo on a three-year contract on a free transfer, being initially assigned to the B-team in Primera Federación; Flamengo also retained 30% of his economic rights over a future sale. Mainly a backup to starter Coke Carrillo, he made his senior debut on 3 April 2026, starting in a 5–1 away loss to Real Madrid Castilla.

== International career ==
Barone was a part of the Brazil national under-17 team squad in the 2023 South American U-17 Championship, being a third-choice during the entire competition as his nation lifted the trophy.
