= Yuri de Oliveira =

Brazilian footballer (born 2001)

Personal information
- Date of birth: 2 January 2001 (age 25)
- Place of birth: Vitória, Brazil
- Height: 1.73 m (5 ft 8 in)
- Position: Midfielder

Team information
- Current team: Calicut
- Number: 10

Youth career
- CTCE Santa Cruz
- Flamengo

Senior career*
Years	Team	Apps	(Gls)
2020–2023	Flamengo	4	(0)
2023	Aimoré	3	(1)
2023	Ponte Preta	2	(0)
2024–2025	FK Transinvest	0	(0)
2025	Amazonas	1	(0)
2025–	Calicut	0	(0)
- * Club domestic league appearances and goals as of 14 February 2024

Yuri de Oliveira (born 2 January 2001) is a Brazilian professional footballer who plays as a midfielder for Super League Kerala club Calicut.

== Career ==
Born in Vitória, Yuri began his career with Flamengo. In 2020, a €45 million buyout clause was set for clubs outside Brazil. He and made his professional debut on 27 September 2020 against Palmeiras. He came on as an 81st-minute substitute for João Lucas as Flamengo drew 1–1.

Unable to establish himself until 2023, he was transferred to CE Aimoré, and subsequently to AA Ponte Preta. Subsequently, Yuri played for FK TransInvest in Lithuania and Amazonas FC, and currently plays for Calicut FC in India.

== Career statistics ==
As of 4 November 2021

Appearances and goals by club, season and competition
Club	Season	League			State League		Cup		Continental		Other		Total	
Club	Season	Division	Apps	Goals	Apps	Goals	Apps	Goals	Apps	Goals	Apps	Goals	Apps	Goals
Flamengo	2020	Série A	1	0	0	0	0	0	—		—		1	0
Flamengo	2021	Série A	0	0	1	0	1	0	0	0	—		2	0
Career total			1	0	1	0	1	0	0	0	0	0	3	0

== Honours ==
Flamengo

- Campeonato Brasileiro Série A: 2020
- Campeonato Carioca: 2021
