= 2022 Copa Sudamericana final =

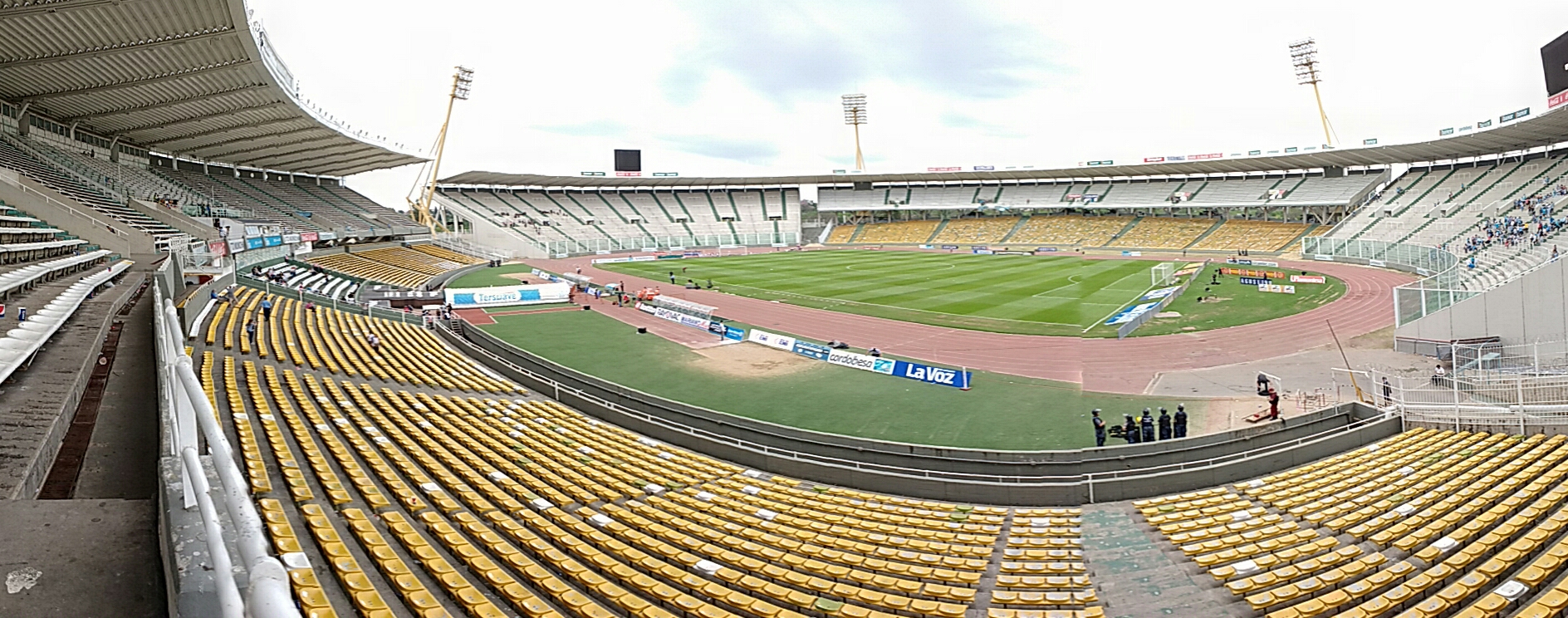
- The Estadio Mario Alberto Kempes in Córdoba hosted the final.
- Event: 2022 Copa Sudamericana
| São Paulo | Independiente del Valle |
| (Brazil) | (Ecuador) |
| 0 | 2 |
- Date: 1 October 2022
- Venue: Estadio Mario Alberto Kempes, Córdoba
- Man of the Match: Lautaro Díaz (Independiente del Valle)
- Referee: Wilmar Roldán (Colombia)
- Attendance: 24,683

The 2022 Copa Sudamericana final was the final match which decided the winner of the 2022 Copa Sudamericana. This was the 21st edition of the Copa Sudamericana, the second-tier South American continental club football tournament organized by CONMEBOL.

The match was played on 1 October 2022 between Brazilian club São Paulo and Ecuadorian club Independiente del Valle, and it was originally scheduled to be played at Estádio Nacional Mané Garrincha in Brasília, Brazil; however, on 23 June 2022 CONMEBOL announced that a change of venue was requested by the Brazilian Football Confederation due to the 2022 Brazilian general election taking place one day after the date of the match. Following consultations between the members of CONMEBOL's Council, Estadio Mario Alberto Kempes in Córdoba, Argentina, which previously hosted the final match of the 2020 Copa Sudamericana, was selected as the new venue for the match.

Independiente del Valle defeated São Paulo by a 2–0 score in the final to win their second title in the tournament. As winners of the 2022 Copa Sudamericana, they earned the right to play against the winners of the 2022 Copa Libertadores in the 2023 Recopa Sudamericana. They also automatically qualified for the 2023 Copa Libertadores group stage.

== Teams ==
| Team | Previous finals appearances (bold indicates winners) |
|---|---|
| (Brazil) São Paulo | 1 (**2012**) |
| (Ecuador) Independiente del Valle | 1 (**2019**) |

== Road to the final ==
Note: In all scores below, the score of the home team is given first.

| (Brazil) São Paulo | | | Round | (Ecuador) Independiente del Valle | | |
|---|---|---|---|---|---|---|
| Opponent | Venue | Score | | Opponent | Venue | Score |
| Bye | | | First stage | Qualified for Copa Libertadores | | |
| **Group D** (Copa Sudamericana) | | | Group stage | **Group D** (Copa Libertadores) | | |
| (Peru) Ayacucho | Away | 2–3 | Group stage | (Brazil) América Mineiro | Away | 0–2 |
| (Chile) Everton | Home | 2–0 | Group stage | (Colombia) Deportes Tolima | Home | 2–2 |
| (Bolivia) Jorge Wilstermann | Away | 1–3 | Group stage | (Brazil) Atlético Mineiro | Home | 1–1 |
| (Chile) Everton | Away | 0–0 | Group stage | (Colombia) Deportes Tolima | Away | 1–0 |
| (Bolivia) Jorge Wilstermann | Home | 3–0 | Group stage | (Brazil) Atlético Mineiro | Away | 3–1 |
| (Peru) Ayacucho | Home | 1–0 | Group stage | (Brazil) América Mineiro | Home | 3–0 |
| Pos / Team / Pld / Pts; **1** / (Brazil) São Paulo / **6** / **16**; 2 / (Chile) Everton / 6 / **11**; 3 / (Peru) Ayacucho / 6 / **4**; 4 / (Bolivia) Jorge Wilstermann / 6 / **2**; Source: CONMEBOL | | | Group stage | Pos / Team / Pld / Pts; 1 / (Brazil) Atlético Mineiro / 6 / **11**; 2 / (Colombia) Deportes Tolima / 6 / **11**; **3** / (Ecuador) Independiente del Valle / **6** / **8**; 4 / (Brazil) América Mineiro / 6 / **2**; Source: CONMEBOL | | |
| **Seed 2** | | | Final stages | **Seed 10** | | |
| (Chile) Universidad Católica (won 8–3 on aggregate) | Away | 2–4 | Round of 16 | (Argentina) Lanús (won 2–1 on aggregate) | Home | 2–1 |
| (Chile) Universidad Católica (won 8–3 on aggregate) | Home | 4–1 | Round of 16 | (Argentina) Lanús (won 2–1 on aggregate) | Away | 0–0 |
| (Brazil) Ceará (tied 2–2 on aggregate, won on penalties) | Home | 1–0 | Quarter-finals | (Venezuela) Deportivo Táchira (won 5–1 on aggregate) | Away | 0–1 |
| (Brazil) Ceará (tied 2–2 on aggregate, won on penalties) | Away | 2–1 (3–4 p) | Quarter-finals | (Venezuela) Deportivo Táchira (won 5–1 on aggregate) | Home | 4–1 |
| (Brazil) Atlético Goianiense (tied 3–3 on aggregate, won on penalties) | Away | 3–1 | Semi-finals | (Peru) Melgar (won 6–0 on aggregate) | Home | 3–0 |
| (Brazil) Atlético Goianiense (tied 3–3 on aggregate, won on penalties) | Home | 2–0 (4–2 p) | Semi-finals | (Peru) Melgar (won 6–0 on aggregate) | Away | 0–3 |

== Match ==
=== Details ===
1 October 2022
17:00 UTC−3

| São Paulo (Brazil) | 0–2 | (Ecuador) Independiente del Valle |
|---|---|---|
| | Report | Díaz 13'; Faravelli 67' |

Estadio Mario Alberto Kempes, Córdoba
Attendance: 24,683
Referee: Wilmar Roldán (Colombia)

| **São Paulo** | **Independiente del Valle** |

| GK | 1 | (Brazil) Felipe Alves |
| RB | 2 | (Brazil) Igor Vinícius |
| RCB | 4 | (Brazil) Diego Costa (c) | (yellow card) 89' (red card) 90+6' |
| LCB | 16 | (Brazil) Léo |
| LB | 6 | (Brazil) Reinaldo | (yellow card) 45+1' |
| RDM | 29 | (Brazil) Pablo Maia |
| LDM | 25 | (Brazil) Rodrigo Nestor | | (substituted off) 75' |
| RM | 12 | (Brazil) Alisson | | (substituted off) 75' |
| LM | 3 | (Brazil) Patrick | | (substituted off) 75' |
| RS | 11 | (Brazil) Luciano |
| LS | 9 | (Argentina) Jonathan Calleri | (yellow card) 87' (yellow-red card) 90+3' |
Substitutes:
| GK | 19 | (Brazil) Jandrei |
| DF | 13 | (Brazil) Rafinha |
| DF | 22 | (Brazil) Miranda |
| DF | 34 | (Brazil) Welington |
| DF | 44 | (Venezuela) Nahuel Ferraresi |
| MF | 20 | (Colombia) Andrés Colorado |
| MF | 21 | (Argentina) Giuliano Galoppo | | (substituted on) 75' |
| MF | 26 | (Brazil) Igor Gomes | | (substituted on) 75' |
| MF | 37 | (Brazil) Talles Costa |
| FW | 23 | (Italy) Éder | | (substituted on) 75' |
| FW | 39 | (Argentina) Nahuel Bustos |
| FW | 45 | (Brazil) Marcos Guilherme |
Manager:
(Brazil) Rogério Ceni

| GK | 1 | (Ecuador) Moisés Ramírez |
| RB | 31 | (Chile) Matías Fernández |
| RCB | 14 | (Argentina) Mateo Carabajal | (yellow card) 43' |
| CB | 5 | (Argentina) Richard Schunke | (yellow card) 79' |
| LCB | 2 | (Ecuador) Luis Segovia |
| LB | 6 | (Ecuador) Jhoanner Chávez | | (substituted off) 90+5' |
| RM | 20 | (Ecuador) Marco Angulo | | (substituted off) 80' |
| CM | 16 | (Argentina) Cristian Pellerano (c) | (yellow card) 89' |
| LM | 8 | (Argentina) Lorenzo Faravelli | | (substituted off) 90+5' |
| RS | 10 | (Ecuador) Junior Sornoza | | (substituted off) 79' |
| LS | 19 | (Argentina) Lautaro Díaz | | (substituted off) 73' |
Substitutes:
| GK | 12 | (Ecuador) Joan López |
| DF | 15 | (Ecuador) Beder Caicedo | | (substituted on) 90+5' |
| DF | 24 | (Ecuador) Orlando Herrera |
| MF | 7 | (Ecuador) Fernando Gaibor | | (substituted on) 80' |
| MF | 11 | (Ecuador) Danny Cabezas |
| MF | 13 | (Ecuador) Patrik Mercado |
| MF | 23 | (Ecuador) Mateo Ortiz | | (substituted on) 90+5' |
| MF | 28 | (Ecuador) Yaimar Medina |
| MF | 29 | (Ecuador) Joao Ortiz | | (substituted on) 73' |
| MF | 50 | (Ecuador) Alan Minda |
| FW | 17 | (Ecuador) Jaime Ayoví | | (substituted on) 79' |
| FW | 32 | (Argentina) Jonatan Bauman |
Manager:
(Argentina) Martín Anselmi

Man of the Match:
Lautaro Díaz (Independiente del Valle)

Assistant referees:
Alexander Guzmán (Colombia)
Wilmar Navarro (Colombia)
Fourth official:
Alexis Herrera (Venezuela)
Fifth official:
Carlos López (Venezuela)
Video assistant referee:
Julio Bascuñán (Chile)
Assistant video assistant referees:
Juan Lara (Chile)
John Alexander León (Colombia)
Leodán González (Uruguay)

**Match rules**

- 90 minutes.
- 30 minutes of extra time if necessary.
- Penalty shoot-out if scores still level.
- Twelve named substitutes.
- Maximum of five substitutions.

== See also ==
- 2022 Copa Libertadores final
- 2023 Recopa Sudamericana
