= 2023 Supercopa Ecuador =

2023 Supercopa Ecuador Ecuabet
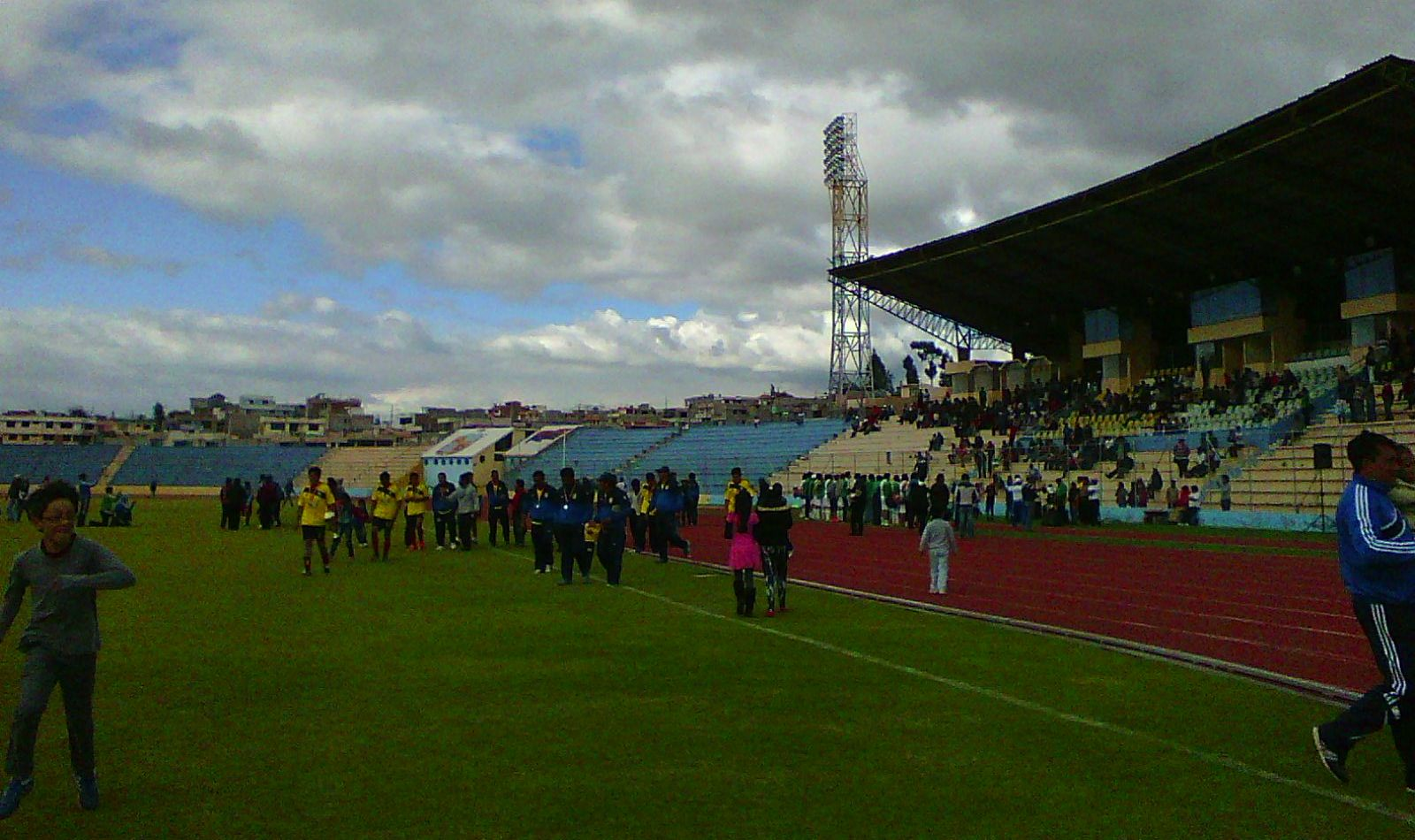
- Estadio La Cocha in Latacunga hosted the match
Independiente del Valle	Aucas
3	0
- Date: 11 February 2023
- Venue: Estadio La Cocha, Latacunga
- Referee: Roberto Sánchez

The 2023 Supercopa Ecuador, known as the 2023 Supercopa Ecuador Ecuabet for sponsorship purposes, was the third edition of the Supercopa Ecuador, Ecuador's football super cup. It was held on 11 February 2023 between the 2022 Ecuadorian Serie A champions Aucas and the 2022 Copa Ecuador champions Independiente del Valle at Estadio La Cocha in Latacunga.

In the match, Independiente del Valle defeated Aucas 3–0 to win their first Supercopa Ecuador title.

== Teams ==
For the 2023 season, the competition returned to the single-match format originally used, unlike the previous Supercopa Ecuador edition (2021) which was contested by six teams. Due to this, the champions of both the Ecuadorian Serie A and the Copa Ecuador were the only two teams that played the competition.

Team	Qualification	Previous appearances (bold indicates winners)
Aucas	2022 Ecuadorian Serie A champions	None
Independiente del Valle	2022 Copa Ecuador champions	1 (2021)

== Details ==
11 February 2023
15:00 UTC−5

Independiente del Valle	3–0	Aucas
Faravelli 10'; Sornoza 75'; Hoyos 90+4'	Report

Estadio La Cocha, Latacunga
Referee: Roberto Sánchez

**Independiente del Valle**	**Aucas**

GK	1	(Ecuador) Moisés Ramírez
RB	13	(Chile) Matías Fernández
CB	14	(Argentina) Mateo Carabajal
CB	5	(Ecuador) Richard Schunke
CB	2	(Argentina) Agustín García Basso
LB	15	(Ecuador) Beder Caicedo	(substituted off) 90'
CM	7	(Ecuador) Jordy Alcívar	(yellow card) 34'	(substituted off) 66'
CM	8	(Argentina) Lorenzo Faravelli	(yellow card) 55'	(substituted off) 90'
CM	16	(Argentina) Cristian Pellerano (c)	(yellow card) 44'
CF	19	(Argentina) Lautaro Díaz	(substituted off) 66'
CF	10	(Ecuador) Junior Sornoza	(substituted off) 78'
Substitutes:
GK	12	(Ecuador) Kleber Pinargote
GK	22	(Ecuador) Alexis Villa
DF	4	(Ecuador) Anthony Landázuri
DF	17	(Ecuador) Gustavo Cortez	(substituted in) 90'
DF	31	(Ecuador) Esnaider Cabezas
MF	11	(Argentina) Michael Hoyos	(substituted in) 78'
MF	18	(Ecuador) Carlos Sánchez
MF	21	(Argentina) Nicolás Previtali	(substituted in) 90'
MF	55	(Ecuador) Kendry Páez
MF	80	(Ecuador) Joao Ortiz	(substituted in) 66'
FW	9	(Ecuador) Kevin Rodríguez	(substituted in) 66'
Manager:
(Argentina) Martín Anselmi

GK	12	(Ecuador) Hernán Galíndez
RB	21	(Ecuador) Pedro Perlaza
CB	5	(Ecuador) Franklin Carabalí
CB	33	(Ecuador) Luis Cangá
LB	29	(Ecuador) Carlos Cuero	(yellow card) 25'
RM	7	(Ecuador) Édison Vega
CM	28	(Ecuador) Jhonny Quiñónez (c)	(yellow card) 81'	(substituted off) 83'
LM	8	(Ecuador) Jordan Rezabala	(yellow card) 31'	(substituted off) 74'
RW	31	(Ecuador) Erick Castillo	(substituted off) 66'
LW	23	(Ecuador) Christian Alemán	(substituted off) 66'
CF	99	(Colombia) Michael Rangel	(substituted off) 74'
Substitutes:
GK	1	(Uruguay) Damián Frascarelli
DF	27	(Ecuador) Luis Romero
DF	52	(Trinidad and Tobago) Aubrey David
MF	10	(Ecuador) Jefferson Montero	(substituted in) 66'
MF	13	(Ecuador) Edison Caicedo
MF	15	(Ecuador) Ángelo Mina	(substituted in) 74'
MF	16	(Ecuador) Sergio Quintero
MF	18	(Ecuador) Marcos Mejía
FW	11	(Ecuador) Daniel Segura	(substituted in) 83'
FW	17	(Ecuador) Roberto Ordóñez	(substituted in) 66'
FW	20	(Ecuador) Michael Mieles
FW	38	(Ecuador) Jhon Cifuente	(substituted in) 74'
Manager:
(Venezuela) César Farías

Assistant referees:
Christian Lescano
David Vacacela
Fourth official:
Juan Carlos Andrade
Video assistant referee:
Carlos Orbe
Assistant video assistant referee:
Edison Vásquez

**Match rules**

- 90 minutes.
- Penalty shoot-out if scores still level.
- Twelve named substitutes.
- Maximum of five substitutions.
