= 2023 Recopa Sudamericana =

CONMEBOL Recopa Sudamericana 2023
Independiente del Valle	Flamengo
(Ecuador)	(Brazil)
1	1
- on aggregate Independiente del Valle won 5–4 on penalties

First leg
Independiente del Valle	Flamengo
1	0
- Date: 21 February 2023
- Venue: Estadio Banco Guayaquil, Quito
- Referee: Piero Maza (Chile)
- Attendance: 8,811

Second leg
Flamengo	Independiente del Valle
1	0
- Date: 28 February 2023
- Venue: Maracanã, Rio de Janeiro
- Referee: Andrés Matonte (Uruguay)
- Attendance: 71,411

The 2023 CONMEBOL Recopa Sudamericana (Portuguese: CONMEBOL Recopa Sul-Americana de 2023) was the 31st edition of the CONMEBOL Recopa Sudamericana (also referred to as the Recopa Sudamericana), the football competition organized by CONMEBOL between the winners of the previous season's two major South American club tournaments, the Copa Libertadores and the Copa Sudamericana.

The competition was contested in two-legged home-and-away format between Brazilian team Flamengo, the 2022 Copa Libertadores champions, and Ecuadorian team Independiente del Valle, the 2022 Copa Sudamericana champions. The first leg was hosted by Independiente del Valle on 21 February 2023 at Estadio Banco Guayaquil in Quito, Ecuador while the second leg was hosted by Flamengo on 28 February 2023 at Maracanã in Rio de Janeiro, Brazil. The matches were originally scheduled to take place on 8 and 15 March, however, CONMEBOL had to reschedule the dates, first to 22 February and 1 March and then to 21 and 28 February, to avoid a clash with the 2022 FIFA Club World Cup in which Flamengo would participate.

This was the first time that a rematch is going to take place in the Recopa Sudamericana. The two teams met previously in the 2020 Recopa Sudamericana, where Flamengo won 5–2 on aggregate.

Independiente del Valle defeated Flamengo 5–4 on penalties after tied 1–1 on aggregate to win their first Recopa Sudamericana.

== Teams ==
Team	Qualification	Previous appearances (bold indicates winners)
(Brazil) Flamengo	2022 Copa Libertadores champions	1 (**2020**)
(Ecuador) Independiente del Valle	2022 Copa Sudamericana champions	1 (2020)

== Format ==
The Recopa Sudamericana is played on a home-and-away two-legged basis, with the Copa Libertadores champions hosting the second leg. If tied on aggregate, the away goals rule would not be used, and 30 minutes of extra time would be played. If still tied after extra time, the penalty shoot-out would be used to determine the winners (Regulations Article 17).

== Matches ==
=== First leg ===
21 February 2023
19:30 UTC−5

Independiente del Valle (Ecuador)	1–0	(Brazil) Flamengo
Carabajal 69'	Report

Estadio Banco Guayaquil, Quito
Attendance: 8,811
Referee: Piero Maza (Chile)

**Independiente del Valle**	**Flamengo**

GK	1	(Ecuador) Moisés Ramírez	(yellow card) 40'
CB	14	(Argentina) Mateo Carabajal	(yellow card) 77'
CB	5	(Argentina) Richard Schunke
CB	2	(Argentina) Agustín García Basso
RM	13	(Chile) Matías Fernández
CM	16	(Argentina) Cristian Pellerano (c)		(substituted off) 73'
CM	8	(Argentina) Lorenzo Faravelli	(yellow card) 37'
LM	15	(Ecuador) Beder Caicedo		(substituted off) 84'
AM	10	(Ecuador) Junior Sornoza	(yellow card) 90'	(substituted off) 90+3'
CF	19	(Argentina) Lautaro Díaz		(substituted off) 73'
CF	9	(Ecuador) Kevin Rodríguez	(yellow card) 52'	(substituted off) 84'
Substitutes:
GK	22	(Ecuador) Kleber Pinargote
DF	4	(Ecuador) Anthony Landázuri
DF	17	(Ecuador) Gustavo Cortez
DF	31	(Ecuador) Esnáider Cabezas
MF	7	(Ecuador) Jordy Alcívar		(substituted on) 84'
MF	21	(Argentina) Nicolás Previtali		(substituted on) 90+3'
MF	51	(Ecuador) Yaimar Medina
MF	54	(Ecuador) Patrik Mercado
MF	55	(Ecuador) Kendry Páez
FW	11	(Argentina) Michael Hoyos		(substituted on) 73'
FW	50	(Ecuador) Alan Minda		(substituted on) 84'
FW	80	(Ecuador) Joao Ortiz	(red card) 88'	(substituted on) 73'
Manager:
(Argentina) Martín Anselmi

GK	1	(Brazil) Santos
RB	2	(Uruguay) Guillermo Varela
CB	15	(Brazil) Fabrício Bruno	(yellow card) 66'
CB	23	(Brazil) David Luiz	(yellow card) 90'
LB	6	(Brazil) Ayrton Lucas
CM	7	(Brazil) Éverton Ribeiro (c)		(substituted off) 78'
DM	8	(Brazil) Thiago Maia		(substituted off) 86'
CM	32	(Chile) Arturo Vidal	(yellow card) 34'
AM	14	(Uruguay) Giorgian de Arrascaeta
CF	10	(Brazil) Gabriel Barbosa	(yellow card) 90+7'
CF	9	(Brazil) Pedro	(yellow card) 40'	(substituted off) 63'
Substitutes:
GK	25	(Brazil) Matheus Cunha
DF	3	(Brazil) Rodrigo Caio
DF	30	(Brazil) Pablo
DF	33	(Brazil) Cleiton
DF	34	(Brazil) Matheuzinho
MF	5	(Chile) Erick Pulgar		(substituted on) 63'
MF	19	(Brazil) Lorran
MF	42	(Brazil) Matheus França
MF	48	(Brazil) Igor Jesus
FW	11	(Brazil) Everton		(substituted on) 78'
FW	40	(Brazil) Matheus Gonçalves		(substituted on) 86'
FW	46	(Brazil) Mateusão
Manager:
(Portugal) Vítor Pereira

Assistant referees:
José Retamal (Chile)
Claudio Urrutia (Chile)
Fourth official:
Cristian Garay (Chile)
Fifth official:
Miguel Rocha (Chile)
Video assistant referee:
Juan Lara (Chile)
Assistant video assistant referees:
Rodrigo Carvajal (Chile)
Edson Cisternas (Chile)
Juan Soto (Venezuela)

Match rules:

- 90 minutes.
- Twelve named substitutes, of which up to five may be used.

=== Second leg ===
Gerson and Gabriel Barbosa (Flamengo) were booked after the penalty shoot-out.

28 February 2023
21:30 UTC−3

Flamengo (Brazil)	1–0 (a.e.t.)	(Ecuador) Independiente del Valle
De Arrascaeta 90+6'	Report
Penalties
De Arrascaeta (penalty missed); David Luiz (penalty scored); Everton (penalty scored); Gerson (penalty scored); Gabriel Barbosa (penalty scored)	4–5	(penalty scored) Faravelli; (penalty scored) Hoyos; (penalty scored) Previtali; (penalty scored) Schunke; (penalty scored) Landázuri

Maracanã, Rio de Janeiro
Attendance: 71,411
Referee: Andrés Matonte (Uruguay)

**Flamengo**	**Independiente del Valle**

GK	1	(Brazil) Santos
RB	2	(Uruguay) Guillermo Varela	(yellow card) 65'	(substituted off) 82'
CB	23	(Brazil) David Luiz	(yellow card) 74'
CB	15	(Brazil) Fabrício Bruno
LB	6	(Brazil) Ayrton Lucas		(substituted off) 112'
DM	8	(Brazil) Thiago Maia	(yellow card) 44'	(substituted off) 72'
RM	7	(Brazil) Éverton Ribeiro (c)	(yellow card) 39'	(substituted off) 82'
CM	32	(Chile) Arturo Vidal	(yellow card) 45+1'	(substituted off) 72'
LM	14	(Uruguay) Giorgian de Arrascaeta
CF	9	(Brazil) Pedro		(substituted off) 112'
CF	10	(Brazil) Gabriel Barbosa	(yellow card) 129'
Substitutes:
GK	25	(Brazil) Matheus Cunha
DF	3	(Brazil) Rodrigo Caio
DF	30	(Brazil) Pablo
DF	34	(Brazil) Matheuzinho		(substituted on) 82'
MF	19	(Brazil) Lorran
MF	20	(Brazil) Gerson	(yellow card) 127'	(substituted on) 72'
MF	42	(Brazil) Matheus França
MF	48	(Brazil) Igor Jesus
FW	11	(Brazil) Everton		(substituted on) 72'
FW	31	(Brazil) Marinho		(substituted on) 112'
FW	40	(Brazil) Matheus Gonçalves		(substituted on) 82'
FW	46	(Brazil) Mateusão	(yellow card) 114'	(substituted on) 112'
Manager:
(Portugal) Vítor Pereira

GK	1	(Ecuador) Moisés Ramírez	(yellow card) 110'
CB	14	(Argentina) Mateo Carabajal	(yellow card) 45+1'
CB	5	(Argentina) Richard Schunke
CB	2	(Argentina) Agustín García Basso
RM	13	(Chile) Matías Fernández		(substituted off) 90+2'
CM	16	(Argentina) Cristian Pellerano (c)	(yellow card) 14'	(substituted off) 100'
CM	8	(Argentina) Lorenzo Faravelli
LM	15	(Ecuador) Beder Caicedo	(yellow card) 90+1'	(substituted off) 99'
AM	7	(Ecuador) Jordy Alcívar	(yellow card) 63'	(substituted off) 63'
AM	10	(Ecuador) Junior Sornoza		(substituted off) 72'
CF	19	(Argentina) Lautaro Díaz		(substituted off) 72'
Substitutes:
GK	22	(Ecuador) Kleber Pinargote
DF	4	(Ecuador) Anthony Landázuri		(substituted on) 72'
DF	17	(Ecuador) Gustavo Cortez		(substituted on) 99'
DF	31	(Ecuador) Esnáider Cabezas
MF	21	(Argentina) Nicolás Previtali		(substituted on) 100'
MF	51	(Ecuador) Yaimar Medina
MF	54	(Ecuador) Patrik Mercado		(substituted on) 90+2'
MF	55	(Ecuador) Kendry Páez
FW	9	(Ecuador) Kevin Rodríguez		(substituted on) 63'
FW	11	(Argentina) Michael Hoyos		(substituted on) 72'
FW	50	(Ecuador) Alan Minda
Manager:
(Argentina) Martín Anselmi

Assistant referees:
Nicolás Tarán (Uruguay)
Martín Soppi (Uruguay)
Fourth official:
José Burgos (Uruguay)
Fifth official:
Andrés Nievas (Uruguay)
Video assistant referee:
Andrés Cunha (Uruguay)
Assistant video assistant referees:
Gustavo Tejera (Uruguay)
Richard Trinidad (Uruguay)
Leodán González (Uruguay)

Match rules:

- 90 minutes.
- 30 minutes of extra time if tied on aggregate (away goals rule not applied).
- Penalty shoot-out if still tied on aggregate after extra time.
- Twelve named substitutes.
- Maximum of five substitutions, with a sixth allowed in extra time.
