= List of football clubs in Ecuador =

Clubs are not only members of the Federación Ecuatoriana de Fútbol, Ecuador's football governing body, but of one of 18 provincial football associations in the country. Clubs play in either Primera Categoría (divided into Serie A or Serie B) or Segunda Categoría.

== Serie A ==
=== 2023 Ecuadorian Serie A teams ===
Club	Home city	Stadium	Aggregate position last season	Founded
Aucas	Quito	Gonzalo Pozo Ripalda	1st (Note: Champion.)	1945
Barcelona	Guayaquil	Monumental Banco Pichincha	5th	1925
Cumbayá	Quito	Olímpico Atahualpa	14th	1970
Delfín	Manta	Estadio Jocay	8th	1989
Deportivo Cuenca	Cuenca	Alejandro Serrano Aguilar	7th	1981
El Nacional	Quito	Olímpico Atahualpa	Serie B	1964
Emelec	Guayaquil	George Capwell	6th	1929
Gualaceo	Azogues	Jorge Andrade Cantos	11th	2000
Guayaquil City	Guayaquil	Christian Benítez Betancourt	10th	2007
Independiente del Valle	Quito	Banco Guayaquil	3rd	1958
LDU Quito	Quito	Rodrigo Paz Delgado	4th	1918
Libertad	Loja	Reina del Cisne	Serie B	2017
Mushuc Runa	Ambato	COAC Mushuc Runa	13th	2003
Orense	Machala	9 de Mayo	9th	2009
Técnico Universitario	Ambato	Bellavista Universidad Indoamérica	12th	1971
Universidad Católica	Quito	Olímpico Atahualpa	2nd	1963

== Serie B ==
=== 2023 Ecuadorian Serie B teams ===
Club	Home city	Stadium	Finishing position last season	Founded
9 de Octubre	Guayaquil	Modelo Alberto Spencer Herrera	Serie A	1912
América de Quito	Quito	Olímpico Atahualpa	4th	1939
Búhos ULVR	Guayaquil	Modelo Alberto Spencer Herrera	7th	1899
Chacaritas	Pelileo	Ciudad de Pelileo	6th	1960
Cuniburo	Cayambe	Olímpico Guillermo Albornoz	Segunda Categoría	1992
Imbabura	Ibarra	Olímpico Ciudad de Ibarra	5th	1993
Independiente Juniors	Sangolquí	Banco Guayaquil	2nd	2017
Macará	Guayaquil	Estadio Bellavista	Serie A	1939
Manta	Manta	Estadio Jocay	8th	1998
Vargas Torres	Esmeraldas	Folke Anderson	Segunda Categoría	1983

== Best results in CONMEBOL competitions ==
- Copa Libertadores
  - Champions (1): 2008

Season	Club	Opponent	Aggregate score
2008	LDU Quito	(Brazil) Fluminense	5–5 (3–1 p)

- Copa Sudamericana
  - Champions (3): 2009, 2019, 2022

Season	Club	Opponent	Score
2009	LDU Quito	(Brazil) Fluminense	5–4 (Note: On aggregate.)
2019	Independiente del Valle	(Argentina) Colón	3–1
2022	Independiente del Valle	(Brazil) São Paulo	2–0

- Recopa Sudamericana
  - Champions (3): 2009, 2010, 2023

Season	Club	Opponent	Aggregate score
2009	LDU Quito	(Brazil) Internacional	4–0
2010	LDU Quito	(Argentina) Estudiantes	2–1
2023	Independiente del Valle	(Brazil) Flamengo	1–1 (5–4 p)

- FIFA Club World Cup
  - Runners-up (1): 2008

Season	Club	Opponent	Score
(Japan) 2008	LDU Quito	(England) Manchester United	0–1
