= Nicolás Previtali =

Argentine professional footballer

Personal information
- Full name: Martín Nicolás Previtali
- Date of birth: 7 July 1995 (age 31)
- Place of birth: Ramos Mejía, Argentina
- Height: 1.84 m (6 ft 0 in)
- Position: Midfielder

Team information
- Current team: Atlanta

Youth career
- Atlanta

Senior career*
Years	Team	Apps	(Gls)
2016–2021	Atlanta	104	(2)
2021–2025	Independiente del Valle	46	(2)
2023	→ Montevideo City Torque (loan)	4	(0)
2024	→ Atlanta (loan)	25	(2)
2025–	Atlanta	41	(1)
- * Club domestic league appearances and goals as of 16:32, 24 April 2026 (UTC)

Martín Nicolás Previtali (born 7 July 1995) is an Argentine professional footballer who plays as a midfielder for Atlanta.

== Career ==
Previtali got his career underway in the ranks of Atlanta of Primera B Metropolitana. He appeared off the bench twice in the 2016 season, prior to making his first start on 22 October 2016 versus Platense. After fifty-eight appearances in four seasons in the third tier, Previtali netted his first goal in a 3–1 victory over Justo José de Urquiza in November 2018. The club won promotion to Primera B Nacional at the end of that season, with Previtali subsequently appearing thirty times in that division; and scoring once, versus Deportivo Morón.

In January 2021, Previtali headed to Ecuadorian Serie A side Independiente del Valle.

== Career statistics ==
As of 30 January 2021.

Appearances and goals by club, season and competition
Club	Season	League			Cup		League Cup		Continental		Other		Total	
Club	Season	Division	Apps	Goals	Apps	Goals	Apps	Goals	Apps	Goals	Apps	Goals	Apps	Goals
Atlanta	2016	Primera B Metropolitana	2	0	0	0	—		—		0	0	2	0
Atlanta	2016–17	Primera B Metropolitana	17	0	0	0	—		—		0	0	17	0
Atlanta	2017–18	Primera B Metropolitana	24	0	3	0	—		—		1 (Note: Appearance(s) in the Primera B Metropolitana play-offs)	0	28	0
Atlanta	2018–19	Primera B Metropolitana	31	1	1	0	—		—		0	0	32	1
Atlanta	2019–20	Primera B Nacional	20	0	0	0	—		—		0	0	20	0
Atlanta	2020	Primera B Nacional	10	1	0	0	—		—		0	0	10	1
Atlanta	Total		104	2	4	0	—		—		1	0	109	2
Independiente del Valle	2021	Serie A	0	0	0	0	—		—		0	0	0	0
Career total			104	2	4	0	—		—		1	0	109	2

== Honours ==
Independiente del Valle

- Ecuadorian Serie A: 2021
- Copa Ecuador: 2022
- Supercopa Ecuador: 2023
- Copa Sudamericana: 2022
- Recopa Sudamericana: 2023
