= Yaimar Medina =

Ecuadorian association football player

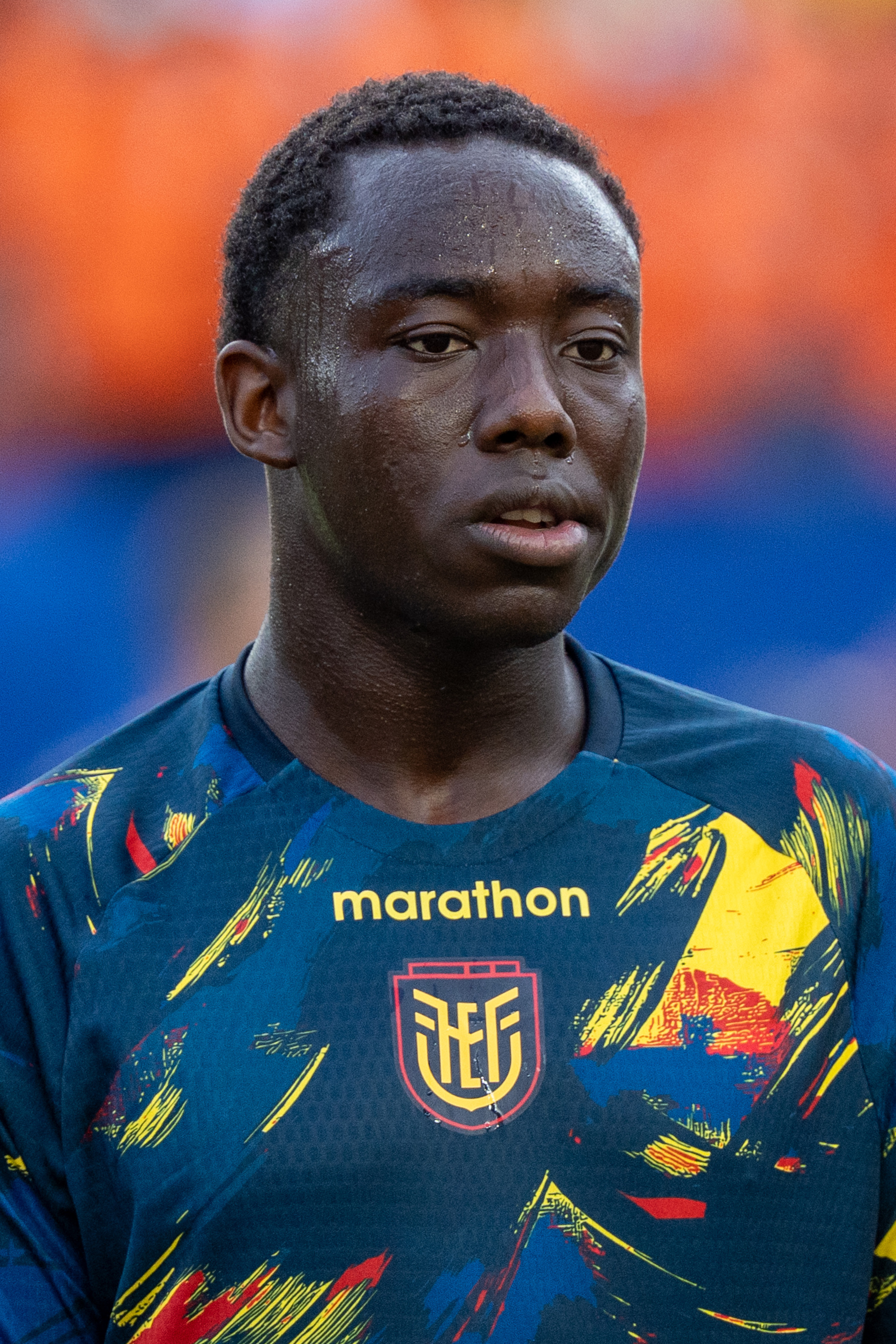
- Medina with Ecuador in 2026

Personal information
- Full name: Yaimar Abel Medina Ortiz
- Date of birth: 5 November 2004 (age 22)
- Place of birth: Eloy Alfaro Canton, Ecuador
- Height: 1.77 m (5 ft 9 1/2 in)
- Position: Midfielder

Team information
- Current team: Genk
- Number: 19

Youth career
- –2022: Independiente del Valle

Senior career*
Years	Team	Apps	(Gls)
2022–2025	Independiente del Valle	48	(6)
2025–	Genk	29	(0)

International career^{‡}
2023	Ecuador U20	9	(1)
2024–	Ecuador U23	2	(3)
2024–	Ecuador	7	(0)
- * Club domestic league appearances and goals as of 6 September 2026 ‡ National team caps and goals as of 16:16, 1 July 2026 (UTC)

Yaimar Abel Medina Ortiz (born 5 November 2004) is an Ecuadorian professional footballer who plays as a midfielder for Belgian Pro League club Genk and the Ecuador national team.

== Club career ==
Medina came through the academy at Independiente del Valle. He made his debut in the first team on 30 July 2022 against Barcelona S.C. in Ecuadorian Serie A. He scored his first league goal on 2 June 2023 in Serie A, contributing to his team's 2–0 victory over S.D. Aucas.

On 9 January 2025, Medina signed a 4.5-year contract with Genk in Belgium.

== International career ==
He was part of the Ecuador national under-20 football team that took part in the 2023 South American U-20 Championship in Colombia, in which his Ecuador side achieved fourth place, ensuring its qualification for the 2023 U-20 World Cup held in Argentina.

On 27 December 2023, he was included by coach Miguel Bravo in the Ecuador national under-23 football team. On his debut, he scored two goals against Colombia U23. He also scored again in his second match against Venezuela U20.

Medina made his debut for the senior Ecuador national team on 6 September 2024 in a World Cup qualifier against Brazil at the Estádio Couto Pereira. He substituted Pervis Estupiñán in the 85th minute, Brazil won 1–0.

On 31 May 2026, Medina was selected in the 26-man squad for the 2026 FIFA World Cup.

== Career statistics ==
=== Club ===
As of match played 6 September 2026

Appearances and goals by club, season and competition
Club	Season	League			National cup (Note: Include Copa Ecuador)		Continental		Other		Total	
Club	Season	Division	Apps	Goals	Apps	Goals	Apps	Goals	Apps	Goals	Apps	Goals
Independiente del Valle	2022	Serie A	5	0	2	0	1 (Note: Appearance(s) in Copa Sudamericana)	0	—		8	0
Independiente del Valle	2023	Serie A	18	1	0	0	4 (Note: Appearance(s) in Copa Libertadores)	0	1 (Note: Appearance(s) in Serie B)	0	23	1
Independiente del Valle	2024	Serie A	25	5	5	0	6	0	—		36	5
Independiente del Valle	Total		48	6	7	0	11	0	1	0	67	6
Genk	2024–25	Belgian Pro League	3	0	—		—		—		3	0
Genk	2025–26	Belgian Pro League	23	0	1	0	12 (Note: Appearances in UEFA Europa League)	1	—		36	1
Genk	2026–27	Belgian Pro League	3	0	0	0	—		—		3	0
Genk	Total		29	0	1	0	12	1	—		42	1
Career total			77	6	8	0	23	1	1	0	109	7

=== International ===
As of match played 30 June 2026

Appearances and goals by national team and year
National team	Year	Apps	Goals
Ecuador	2024	1	0
Ecuador	2025	3	0
Ecuador	2026	3	0
Total		7	0

== Style of play ==
Medina has played on both flanks, both deeper as a wing-back and further forward in a more attacking position.

== Honours ==
Independiente del Valle

- Serie A: 2021
- Copa Ecuador: 2022
- Supercopa Ecuador: 2023
- Copa Sudamericana: 2022
- Recopa Sudamericana: 2023
