= Kendry Páez =

Ecuadorian footballer (born 2007)

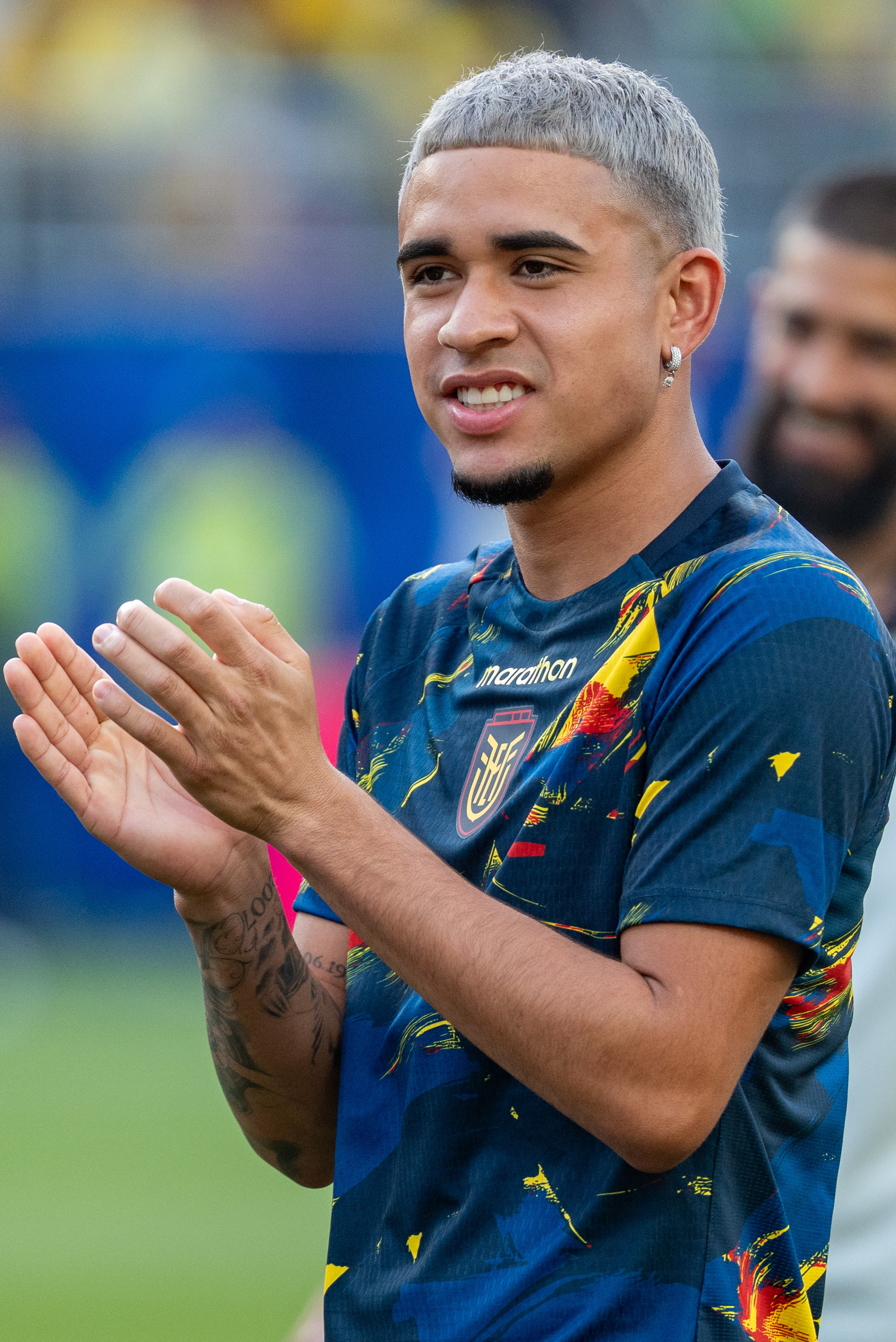
- Paez with Ecuador in 2026

Personal information
- Full name: Ray Kendry Páez Andrade
- Date of birth: 4 May 2007 (age 19)
- Place of birth: Guayaquil, Ecuador
- Height: 1.78 m (5 ft 10 in)
- Position: Winger

Team information
- Current team: Chelsea

Youth career
- 2012–2015: Academia Alfaro Moreno
- 2015–2016: Emelec
- 2016–2017: Patria
- 2018–2023: Independiente del Valle

Senior career*
Years	Team	Apps	(Gls)
2023–2025	Independiente del Valle	51	(12)
2025–	Chelsea	0	(0)
2025–2026	→ Strasbourg (loan)	15	(1)
2026	→ River Plate (loan)	10	(1)

International career^{‡}
2022–2023	Ecuador U17	13	(5)
2023–	Ecuador U20	8	(2)
2023–	Ecuador	28	(2)
- * Club domestic league appearances and goals as of 23:26, 24 May 2026 (UTC) ‡ National team caps and goals as of 09:10, 18 November 2026 (UTC)

Ray Kendry Páez Andrade (born 4 May 2007) is an Ecuadorian professional footballer who plays as a winger for Premier League club Chelsea and the Ecuador national team.

== Club career ==
=== Early career ===
Born in Guayaquil, Páez began his career with local side Barcelona's youth department Academia Alfaro Moreno at the age of five. Barcelona SC was offered the chance to register Páez at the age of eight, but the club did not sign him as it was "too hard for a president to pay for a player at this age". He later had a short stint at Emelec before moving to Patria, where he started to feature more regularly as a forward.

=== Independiente del Valle ===
Páez joined Independiente del Valle in 2018, aged 12. His performances for their youth team, including being named most outstanding player at the 2022 Next Generation Trophy in Salzburg, Austria, drew the attention of multiple clubs across Europe. He reportedly attracted interest from German club Borussia Dortmund, while English side Manchester United had an opening bid for Páez rejected in December 2022.

He was promoted to the Independiente del Valle's first team for the 2023 pre-season, at the age of fifteen. On 25 February 2023, he marked his highly anticipated professional debut with a goal; the third in a 3–1 Ecuadorian Serie A win over Mushuc Runa. Having received a lifted cut-back on the right-hand side of the penalty area from Anthony Landázuri, he instinctively floated the ball over the goalkeeper, Jorge Pinos, on the volley into the far corner of the goal. In doing so, he became the youngest debutant, and youngest goal-scorer, in the Ecuadorian top flight.

=== Chelsea ===
On 5 June 2023, it was announced that Páez would join Premier League club Chelsea after his 18th birthday, in the summer of 2025.

==== Strasbourg (loan) ====
On 31 July 2025, Páez joined Ligue 1 club Strasbourg on a season-long loan.

==== River Plate (loan) ====
On 31 January 2026, Páez joined River Plate on a one-year loan. His loan was terminated on 28 August 2026 by Chelsea after seven months due to lack of playing time.

== International career ==
=== Youth ===
Paéz has represented Ecuador at under-17 level, scoring against both Argentina and Colombia. He was left out of Ecuador's under-20 squad for the 2023 South American U-20 Championship to facilitate his transition into the Independiente del Valle first team squad.

He was called up to the Ecuador under-17 squad again for the 2023 South American U-17 Championship in March 2023. In their first game, he provided an assist for Ecuador's second goal in their 2–2 comeback draw with Brazil - a through-ball from his own half which was then converted by teammate Geremy de Jesús. Páez was included in Ecuador's squad for the 2023 FIFA U-20 World Cup in Argentina; he was the youngest player to be included in the final squad of any of the participating nations in the tournament. On 26 May, Páez scored a goal in Ecuador's 9–0 win over Fiji, becoming the youngest player to score in the FIFA U20 World Cup.

=== Senior ===
On 5 June 2023, Páez was called up to the Ecuador senior squad for the first time.

On 12 September 2023, Páez made his debut with the senior team, starting in a 2–1 World Cup qualifier win over Uruguay and providing the assist for Félix Torres' match winning goal. Thus, he became the youngest player ever to represent La Tri and the second youngest South American to ever play international football behind Diego Maradona. On 12 October, he scored his first goal for Ecuador in a 2–1 win over Bolivia, becoming the youngest ever goalscorer in CONMEBOL World Cup qualifiers at the age of 16 years and 161 days.

On 29 May 2024, he was selected in the 26-man squad for the 2024 Copa América. On 26 June, he scored a penalty in a 3–1 victory against Jamaica, becoming the second youngest scorer in the competition, aged 17 years and 53 days, following Johnnier Montaño.

On 31 May 2026, Páez was selected in the 26-man squad for the 2026 FIFA World Cup.

== Style of play ==
Paéz took inspiration from fellow Ecuadorian Gonzalo Plata and Argentine Lionel Messi, both of whom he watched as a child, to improve his own dribbling ability.

== Career statistics ==
=== Club ===
As of match played 24 May 2026

Appearances and goals by club, season and competition
Club	Season	League			National cup (Note: Includes Copa Ecuador)		Continental		Total	
Club	Season	Division	Apps	Goals	Apps	Goals	Apps	Goals	Apps	Goals
Independiente del Valle	2023	Ecuadorian Serie A	24	5	—		5 (Note: Appearances in Copa Libertadores)	0	29	5
Independiente del Valle	2024	Ecuadorian Serie A	27	7	6	0	8 (Note: Six appearances and one goal in Copa Libertadores, two appearances in Copa Sudamericana)	1	41	8
Independiente del Valle	Total		51	12	6	0	13	1	70	13
Strasbourg (loan)	2025–26	Ligue 1	15	1	0	0	6 (Note: Appearances in UEFA Conference League)	0	21	1
River Plate (loan)	2026	Argentine Primera División	10	1	0	0	4 (Note: Appearances in Copa Sudamericana)	0	14	1
Career total			76	14	6	0	23	1	105	15

=== International ===
As of match played 17 November 2026

Appearances and goals by national team and year
National team	Year	Apps	Goals
Ecuador	2023	5	1
Ecuador	2024	12	1
Ecuador	2025	6	0
Ecuador	2026	5	0
Total		28	2

Scores and results list Ecuador's goal tally first.

List of international goals scored by Kendry Páez
No.	Date	Venue	Opponent	Score	Result	Competition
1	12 October 2023	Estadio Hernando Siles, La Paz, Bolivia	Bolivia	1–0	2–1	2026 FIFA World Cup qualification
2	26 June 2024	Allegiant Stadium, Las Vegas, United States	Jamaica	2–0	3–1	2024 Copa América

== Honours ==
Independiente del Valle

- Recopa Sudamericana: 2023
- Supercopa Ecuador: 2023
