= Matías Fernández =

Matías Fernández may refer to:

- Matías Fernández (footballer, born 1986), Chilean former football attacking midfielder
- Matías Fernández (footballer, born 1995), Chilean football midfielder and wing-back
- Matías Fernández Hartwig (born 1987), Chilean politician
- Matias Fernandez-Pardo (born 2005), Belgian football winger
