= Joao Ortiz (Ecuadorian footballer) =

Ecuadorian footballer (born 1996)

Personal information
- Full name: Julio Joao Ortiz Landázuri
- Date of birth: 1 May 1996 (age 30)
- Place of birth: Esmeraldas, Ecuador
- Height: 1.77 m (5 ft 10 in)
- Position: Midfielder

Team information
- Current team: Portland Timbers
- Number: 80

Youth career
- El Nacional
- 2013–2014: Universidad Católica

Senior career*
Years	Team	Apps	(Gls)
2014	Universidad Católica	1	(0)
2015–2018	San Antonio		
2015	→ Plaza Colonia (loan)	3	(0)
2016	→ Deportivo Quito (loan)	2	(0)
2017	→ Cumbayá (loan)	18	(2)
2017–2018	→ Clan Juvenil (loan)	27	(1)
2018	→ Deportivo Cuenca (loan)	2	(0)
2019	Deportivo Cuenca	18	(0)
2020–2021	Delfín	55	(3)
2022	LDU Quito	13	(0)
2022–2025	Independiente del Valle	68	(2)
2025–	Portland Timbers	20	(0)

International career^{‡}
2013	Ecuador U17		
2021–	Ecuador	9	(0)
- * Club domestic league appearances and goals as of 11 January 2026 ‡ National team caps and goals as of 9 June 2024

Julio Joao Ortiz Landázuri (born 1 May 1996) is an Ecuadorian professional professional footballer who plays as a midfielder for Portland Timbers and the Ecuador national team.

== Club career ==
Born in Esmeraldas, Ecuador, Ortiz was with El Nacional and Universidad Católica as a youth player.

After playing on loan for Uruguayan side Plaza Colonia in 2015, he has developed his career in his country of birth. In the second level, he has played for San Antonio, Deportivo Quito and Clan Juvenil. In the third level, he played for Cumbayá.

In the Ecuadorian Serie A, he has played for Universidad Católica, Clan Juvenil, Deportivo Cuenca, Delfín, LDU Quito and Independiente del Valle since 2022.

On 15 January 2025, Ortiz signed with Major League Soccer side Portland Timbers.

== International career ==
Ortiz was a member of the Ecuador under-17 squad in the 2013 South American Championship.

At senior level, he made his debut in a friendly against Mexico in October 2021.

=== International ===
As of 9 June 2024

Ecuador
Year	Apps	Goals
2021	1	0
2023	7	0
2024	1	0
Total	9	0

== Honours ==
Independiente del Valle

- Copa Ecuador: 2022
- Supercopa Ecuador: 2023
- Copa Sudamericana: 2022
- Recopa Sudamericana: 2023
