= Michael Hoyos =

Argentine footballer (born 1991)

Personal information
- Full name: Michael Ryan Hoyos
- Date of birth: 2 August 1991 (age 35)
- Place of birth: Fountain Valley, California, U.S.
- Height: 1.85 m (6 ft 1 in)
- Position: Winger

Team information
- Current team: Sporting Cristal
- Number: 22

Youth career
- 2006: Irvine Strikers
- 2007–2010: Estudiantes

Senior career*
Years	Team	Apps	(Gls)
2010–2014	Estudiantes	13	(1)
2013–2014	→ OFI (loan)	13	(1)
2014–2015	Sarmiento	14	(0)
2015	Deportivo Santamarina	19	(2)
2016	Boca Unidos	34	(6)
2017	Deportivo Cuenca	43	(4)
2018–2020	Guayaquil City	94	(27)
2021	Barcelona SC	15	(2)
2022	LDU Quito	26	(8)
2023–2026	Independiente del Valle	86	(27)
2026	Newell's Old Boys	9	(1)
2026–	Sporting Cristal	10	(4)

International career
2010–2011	Argentina U20	9	(1)
2011	Argentina U23	3	(0)
- * Club domestic league appearances and goals as of 17:37, 4 October 2026 (UTC)

Michael Ryan Hoyos (born 2 August 1991) is a footballer who plays as a winger for Peruvian club Sporting Cristal. Born in the United States, he has represented Argentina at youth level.

== Club career ==
=== Youth ===
Hoyos attended Santa Margarita Catholic High School in Rancho Santa Margarita, California where he was a footballer. Outside of school, he played with Irvine Strikers, coached by Don Ebert. He moved to Argentina together with his mother at age fifteen, and soon had a successful trial with Estudiantes de La Plata and was placed into the club's youth system.

=== Estudiantes ===
Hoyos debuted with the first team in a January 2010 non-official match against Boca Juniors. He scored on a solo run from midfield, earning a spot on the first-team bench. On January 29, 2010, he made his league debut as a substitute against Arsenal de Sarandí.

=== OFI ===
Hoyos moved to Super League Greece club OFI on July 8, 2013.

== International career ==
After managers for both the United States and Argentina expressed interest in having Hoyos attend their under-20 camps, Hoyos was part of the sparring roster that practiced with the Argentina national team during the South Africa 2010 FIFA World Cup, and was called for the Argentina under-20 side. In his international debut on July 27, 2010, against Uruguay, in Asunción, he scored the winning goal. He scored against Uruguay again in the 2011 edition of the South American Under-20 tournament.

== Personal life ==
His parents were from Don Torcuato in Buenos Aires province. Hoyos, who holds dual USA-Argentine citizenship, is the third USA player to play in the Argentine top league, after Renato Corsi, who played for Argentinos Juniors and other teams in the 1980s, and Bryan Gerzicich, who played for Arsenal in 2006. His younger brother, Kevin, is also American and currently plays in the Estudiantes youth system as a striker.

On April 4, 2011, Hoyos was involved in a car accident when his car struck a tree at the González roundabout in the outskirts of La Plata. After a few days in intensive care, Hoyos was released April 19 and started undergoing physical therapy to rejoin the team.

== Honours ==
Estudiantes

- Argentine Primera División (1): 2010 Apertura

Independiente del Valle

- 2025 LigaPro Serie A
- 2023 Supercopa Ecuador
- 2023 Recopa Sudamericana
