= Matías Fernández (footballer, born 1995) =

Chilean footballer

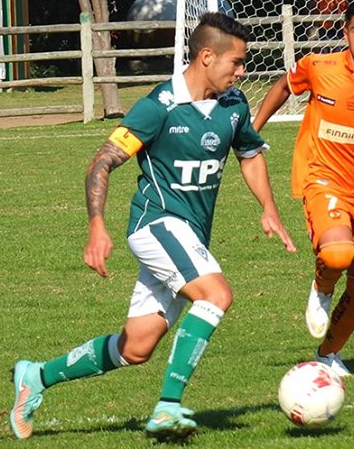
- Fernández with Santiago Wanderers in 2015

Personal information
- Full name: Matías Ignacio Fernández Cordero
- Date of birth: 14 August 1995 (age 31)
- Place of birth: Valparaíso, Chile
- Height: 1.73 m (5 ft 8 in)
- Positions: Wing-back; midfielder

Team information
- Current team: Colo-Colo

Youth career
- Colegio Salesiano
- 2006–2014: Santiago Wanderers

Senior career*
Years	Team	Apps	(Gls)
2012–2020	Santiago Wanderers	127	(5)
2021–2022	Unión La Calera	38	(0)
2022–2025	Independiente del Valle	84	(1)
2026–	Colo-Colo	0	(0)

International career^{‡}
2023	Chile	1	(0)
- * Club domestic league appearances and goals as of 19 December 2025 ‡ National team caps and goals as of 7 November 2026

Matías Ignacio Fernández Cordero (born 14 August 1995) is a Chilean footballer who plays as a midfielder or wing back for Colo-Colo.

== Club career ==
He joined to Wanderers’ youth ranks when he was 11.

On second half 2022, Fernández moved to Ecuador and joined Independiente del Valle.

Back to Chile, Fernández joined Colo-Colo in December 2025.

== International career ==
Fernández received his first call up to the Chile national team for the 2026 World Cup qualifiers in October 2023 and made his debut in the match against Peru.

== Honours ==
Santiago Wanderers

- Primera B de Chile: 2019
- Copa Chile: 2017

Independiente del Valle

- Ecuadorian Serie A: 2025
- Copa Ecuador: 2022
- Supercopa Ecuador: 2023
- Copa Sudamericana: 2022
- Recopa Sudamericana: 2023

== Career statistics ==
=== Club ===
As of 27 May 2025.

Appearances and goals by club, season and competition
Club	Division	League			Cup		Continental		Total	
Club	Division	Season	Apps	Goals	Apps	Goals	Apps	Goals	Apps	Goals
Santiago Wanderers	Primera División	2015-16	14	1	3	0	—		17	1
Santiago Wanderers	Primera División	2016-17	22	0	2	0	—		24	0
Santiago Wanderers	Primera División	2017	11	1	6	0	—		17	1
Santiago Wanderers	Primera B	2018	30	2	2	0	3	0	35	2
Santiago Wanderers	Primera B	2019	19	0	3	0	—		22	0
Santiago Wanderers	Primera División	2020	31	1	—		—		31	1
Santiago Wanderers	Total		127	5	16	0	3	0	146	5
Unión La Calera	Primera División	2021	27	0	2	0	5	0	34	0
Unión La Calera	Primera División	2022	11	0	2	0	6	0	19	0
Unión La Calera	Total		38	0	4	0	11	0	53	0
Independiente del Valle	Serie A	2022	12	1	5	0	5	0	22	1
Independiente del Valle	Serie A	2023	20	0	1	0	10	0	31	0
Independiente del Valle	Serie A	2024	22	0	6	0	5	0	33	0
Independiente del Valle	Serie A	2025	11	0	0	0	3	0	14	0
Independiente del Valle	Total		65	1	12	0	23	0	100	1
Career total			230	6	32	0	37	0	299	6

== Honours ==
Santiago Wanderers

- Primera B: 2019
- Copa Chile: 2017

Independiente del Valle

- LigaPro Serie A: 2025
