= Martín Anselmi =

Argentine football manager

- Anselmi in 2025

Personal information
- Full name: Martín Rodrigo Anselmi
- Date of birth: 11 July 1985 (age 41)
- Place of birth: Rosario, Argentina

Team information
- Current team: Elche (head coach)

Youth career
- Years: Team
- Ferro Carril Oeste

Managerial career
- 2015: Excursionistas (youth)
- 2016: CAI (youth)
- 2016: Independiente (assistant)
- 2017–2018: Atlanta (assistant)
- 2018: Universidad Católica del Ecuador (reserves)
- 2019: Real Garcilaso (reserves)
- 2019–2020: Independiente del Valle (assistant)
- 2020–2021: Internacional (assistant)
- 2022: Unión La Calera
- 2022–2023: Independiente del Valle
- 2024–2025: Cruz Azul
- 2025: Porto
- 2026: Botafogo
- 2026–: Elche

Martín Rodrigo Anselmi (born 11 July 1985) is an Argentine professional football manager who is the head coach of La Liga club Elche.

== Early life ==
Born in Rosario, Santa Fe, Anselmi played youth football for Ferro Carril Oeste. He also has a journalism degree at DeporTEA in Buenos Aires, but never worked in the profession.

== Career ==
=== Early career ===
Anselmi began his career with Excursionistas' youth setup in 2015, and had a brief stint at CAI before being invited by Gabriel Milito to join his staff at Independiente in 2016.

In 2017, Anselmi joined Atlanta as Francisco Berscé's assistant. In the following year, he moved abroad and was named in charge of Ecuadorian side Universidad Católica del Ecuador's reserve team.

In 2019, after a short period at Real Garcilaso, Anselmi returned to Ecuador and became Miguel Ángel Ramírez's assistant at Independiente del Valle. He followed Ramírez to Internacional, but left the club on 11 June when the manager was dismissed.

=== Unión La Calera ===
On 17 December 2021, Anselmi was named manager of Chilean Primera División side Unión La Calera for the ensuing campaign. The following 25 April, with only one win in 11 league matches, he left the club on a mutual agreement.

=== Independiente del Valle ===
On 30 May 2022, Anselmi returned to del Valle, now replacing Renato Paiva as manager. He won four titles with the club, before resigning on 17 December 2023, after losing the 2023 Serie A finals on penalties.

=== Cruz Azul ===
On 20 December 2023, Mexican club Cruz Azul appointed Anselmi as head coach. He led the team to the Clausura 2024 final, where they finished as runners-up after a narrow defeat to Club América. On 22 January 2025, Anselmi left the club to join Porto in Portugal. His departure sparked a dispute over the payment of his release clause. The matter was resolved in May 2025, with Cruz Azul receiving $3.5 million in compensation.

=== Porto ===
On 27 January 2025, Porto announced Anselmi as their new head coach. On 1 July, he was dismissed after a poor performance in the 2025 FIFA Club World Cup.

=== Botafogo ===
On 22 December 2025, Anselmi switched teams and countries again, after being announced as head coach of Campeonato Brasileiro Série A side Botafogo on a two-year contract. He was relieved of his duties on 22 March 2026.

=== Elche ===
On 13 June 2026, Anselmi returned to Europe after being named manager of La Liga side Elche; he signed a one-year deal, with an option for a further campaign.

== Managerial statistics ==
As of 8 November 2026

Managerial record by team and tenure
Team	Nat.	From	To	Record								Ref
Team	Nat.	From	To	G	W	D	L	GF	GA	GD	Win %	Ref
Unión La Calera	(Chile)	17 December 2021	25 April 2022	15	3	8	4	9	15	−6	20.00	
Independiente del Valle	(Ecuador)	30 May 2022	20 December 2023	74	45	12	17	119	65	+54	60.81	
Cruz Azul	(Mexico)	1 January 2024	24 January 2025	50	26	14	10	79	44	+35	52.00	
Porto	(Portugal)	27 January 2025	1 July 2025	21	10	6	5	32	25	+7	47.62	
Botafogo	(Brazil)	22 December 2025	22 March 2026	18	7	2	9	22	21	+1	38.89	
Elche	(Spain)	13 June 2026	Present	13	3	4	6	17	21	−4	23.08	
Career total				191	94	46	51	278	191	+87	49.21	—

== Honours ==
Independiente del Valle

- Copa Sudamericana: 2022
- Copa Ecuador: 2022
- Supercopa Ecuador: 2023
- Recopa Sudamericana: 2023

Individual

- Liga MX Manager of the Month: September 2024, October 2024
