= Guido Villar =

Argentine footballer (born 1998)

Personal information
- Full name: Guido Emanuel Villar
- Date of birth: 15 February 1998 (age 28)
- Place of birth: Bahía Blanca, Argentina
- Height: 1.92 m (6 ft 4 in)
- Position: Goalkeeper

Team information
- Current team: Independiente del Valle
- Number: 22

Youth career
- 2006–2007: Villa Delfina
- Bella Vista
- Olimpo

Senior career*
Years	Team	Apps	(Gls)
2016–2024	Olimpo	71	(0)
2023	→ Barracas Central (loan)	0	(0)
2024–	Independiente DV	41	(0)
- * Club domestic league appearances and goals as of 19 October 2025

Guido Emanuel Villar (born 15 February 1998) is an Argentine professional footballer who plays as a goalkeeper for Ecuadorian Serie A club Independiente del Valle.

== Club career ==
Villar's senior career got underway with Olimpo, after a youth stint with them, Villa Delfina (between 2006 and 2007) and Bella Vista. He was put into the first-team of the Primera División club in 2016–17, but didn't make his debut until 2017–18 when he marked it with a ninety-minute appearance against San Lorenzo at the Estadio Pedro Bidegain on 17 March 2018; on the way to four appearances as Olimpo suffered relegation.

== International career ==
Villar was called up to train with the Argentina U17s in 2014.

== Career statistics ==
As of 28 February 2019.

Appearances and goals by club, season and competition
Club	Season	League			Cup		Continental		Other		Total	
Club	Season	Division	Apps	Goals	Apps	Goals	Apps	Goals	Apps	Goals	Apps	Goals
Olimpo	2016–17	Primera División	0	0	0	0	—		0	0	0	0
Olimpo	2017–18	Primera División	4	0	0	0	—		0	0	4	0
Olimpo	2018–19	Primera B Nacional	0	0	0	0	—		0	0	0	0
Career total			4	0	0	0	—		0	0	4	0
