= Júnior Sornoza =

Ecuadorian footballer (born 1994)

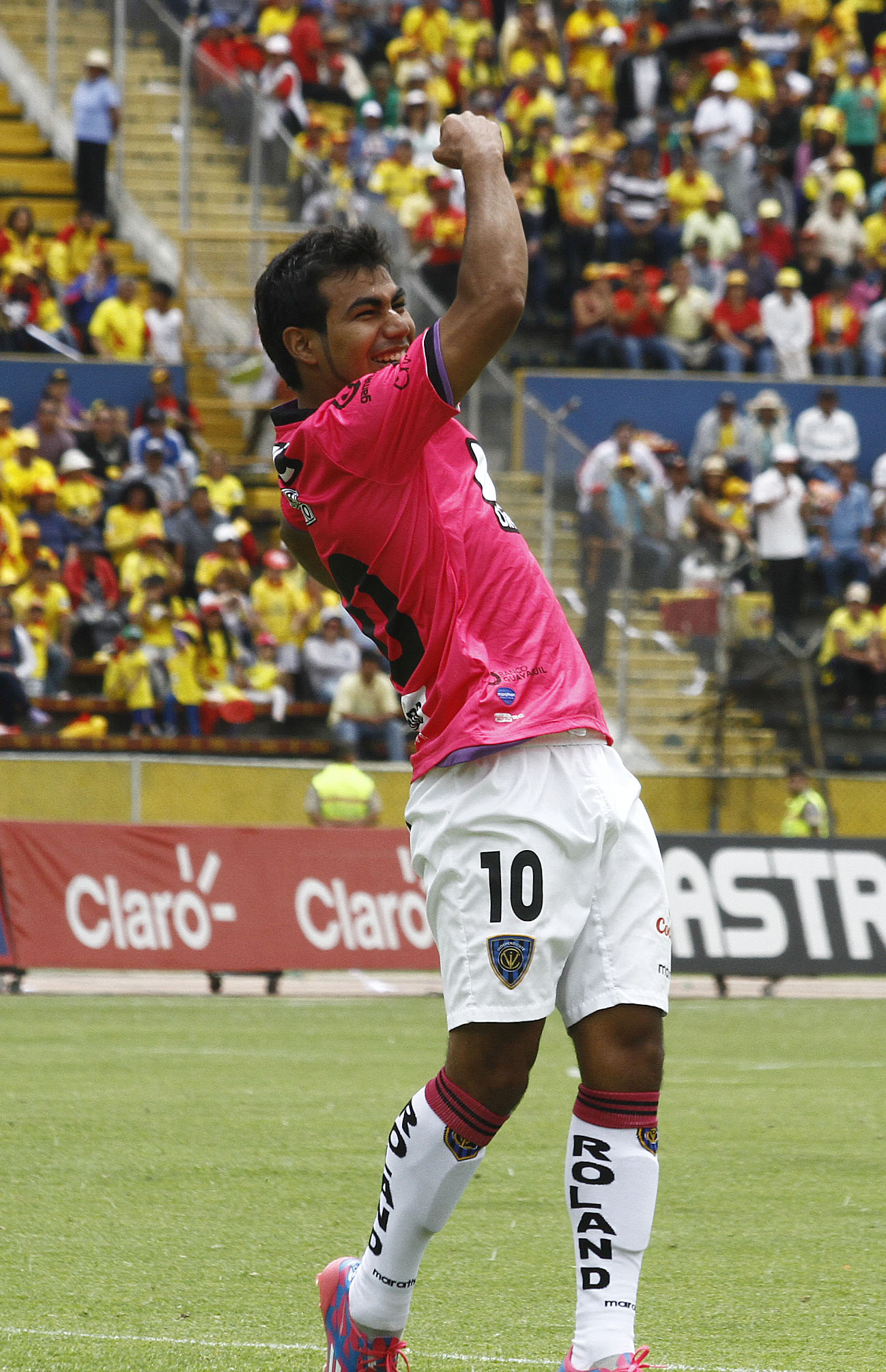
- Sornoza playing for Independiente del Valle

Personal information
- Full name: Junior Nazareno Sornoza Moreira
- Date of birth: 28 January 1994 (age 32)
- Place of birth: Portoviejo, Ecuador
- Height: 1.66 m (5 ft 5 in)
- Position: Attacking midfielder

Team information
- Current team: Independiente del Valle
- Number: 11

Youth career
- 2009–2010: Independiente del Valle

Senior career*
Years	Team	Apps	(Gls)
2011–2016	Independiente del Valle	155	(56)
2015	→ Pachuca (loan)	12	(1)
2017–2018	Fluminense	44	(3)
2019–2021	Corinthians	20	(0)
2020	→ LDU Quito (loan)	27	(3)
2021	→ Tijuana (loan)	16	(0)
2021	→ Independiente del Valle (loan)	17	(3)
2022–	Independiente del Valle	87	(15)

International career^{‡}
2010–2011	Ecuador U17	12	(2)
2013	Ecuador U20	7	(0)
2014–	Ecuador	17	(2)
- * Club domestic league appearances and goals as of 19 August 2025 ‡ National team caps and goals as of 23:50, 21 November 2023 (UTC)

Júnior Nazareno Sornoza Moreira (born 28 January 1994 in Portoviejo) is an Ecuadorian professional footballer who plays as an attacking midfielder for Ecuadorian Serie A club Independiente Del Valle and the Ecuador national team.

== Club career ==
=== Independiente del Valle ===
==== 2011–2014 ====
On August 24 of 2011, Sornoza made his career debut for the club, in a 1–0 home loss to Deportivo Quito. On September 25, Júnior scored his first goals for the club in an emphatic 5–0 home win over Emelec. He finished his debut season having played 10 league games and scoring only 2 goals at the age of 17. Sornoza's first game of the 2012 season was on February 4, in a 1–0 home win over LDU Loja. His only goal of the season came on December 2, in a 2–1 away loss to LDU Loja. Sornoza only scored 1 goal in 16 league matches played. Júnior's first league match of the 2013 Serie A season was on February 9, in a 0–0 home draw against Deportivo Quito. On May 25 Júnior scored 4 goals against Ecuadorian giants Emelec 5–1 against Macara. Sornoza helped Independiente achieve second place league status, with 19 goals in 36 league matches. Sornoza played and scored in Independiente's first ever participation of Copa Libertadores on February 18, against Union Espanola, drawing 2–2 at home. On March 12, in a Copa Libertadores group match, Sornoza scored a fantastic long range goal in injury time against Botafogo to give Independiente their first ever competition win. On March 27, Sornoza scored a late penalty against San Lorenzo to equalize 1–1 in the last minute of stoppage time. On April 9, Júnior Sornoza guided Independiente del Valle to a 5–4 victory against Chilean club Union Espanola. He contributed to 4 of those goals with 3 assists and scoring a penalty. This was Independiente's first away victory in the Copa Libertadores although it was not enough to qualify to the next round. Júnior Sornoza ended the tournament with 4 goals and 3 assists in 6 games.

==== Loan to Pachuca ====
On January 13, 2015, it was confirmed that Sornoza would be joining Liga MX side Pachuca on a one-year loan deal.

==== Return to Independiente ====
On July 21, 2015, it was confirmed that Sornoza would be returning to Ecuador to play for Independiente.

=== Fluminense ===
On July 28, 2016, it was confirmed that Sornoza would join Fluminense in January 2017. He will spend 6 more months at Independiente.

=== Corinthians ===
On January 8, 2019, it was confirmed that Sornoza joined two-time FIFA Club World Cup champions Corinthians. Timão paid R$10 million for his services.

== International career ==
Sornoza made his debut on September 6, 2014, scoring the fourth goal in an international friendly against Bolivia.

== Career statistics ==
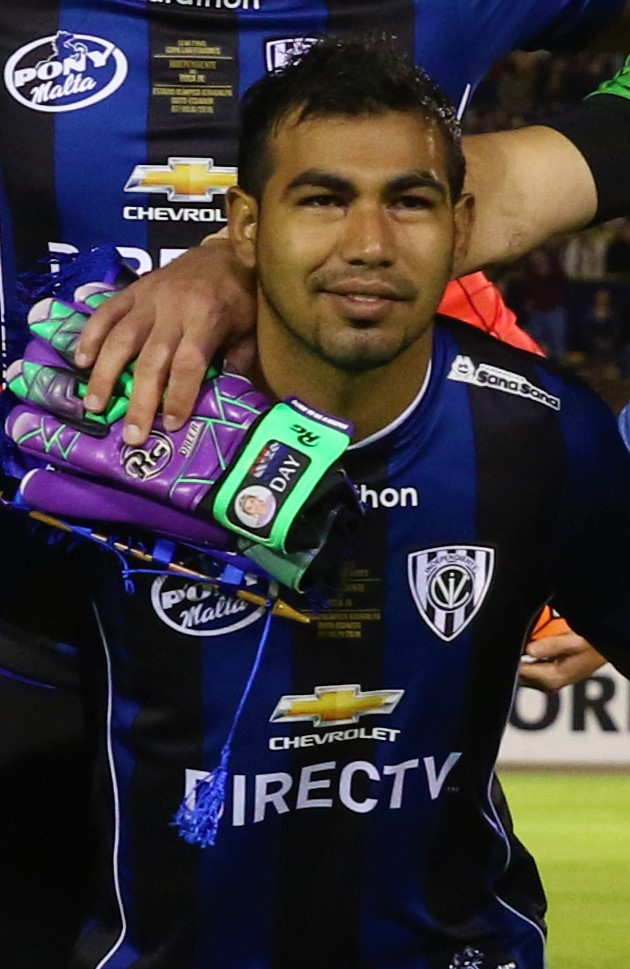
Sornoza with Independiente del Valle in 2016

=== Club ===
As of 24 July 2018

Club	Season	League			Cup		Continental		Other		Total	
Club	Season	Division	Apps	Goals	Apps	Goals	Apps	Goals	Apps	Goals	Apps	Goals
Independiente del Valle	2011	Serie A	10	2	–		–		–		10	2
Independiente del Valle	2012	Serie A	16	1	–		–		–		16	1
Independiente del Valle	2013	Serie A	36	19	–		3	0	–		39	19
Independiente del Valle	2014	Serie A	41	17	–		10	4	–		51	21
Independiente del Valle	2015	Serie A	18	8	–		–		–		18	8
Independiente del Valle	2016	Serie A	34	9	–		16	6	–		50	15
Independiente del Valle	Total		155	56	–		29	10	–		184	66
Pachuca (loan)	2014–2015	Liga MX	12	1	0	0	2	0	–		14	1
Fluminense	2017	Série A	15	2	7	3	5	0	15	1	42	6
Fluminense	2018	Série A	29	1	4	1	10	1	11	1	54	4
Fluminense	Total		44	3	11	4	15	1	26	2	96	10
Career total			211	60	11	4	46	11	26	2	294	77

=== International ===
As of 21 November 2023

Ecuador
Year	Apps	Goals
2014	4	1
2018	3	0
2019	3	1
2020	1	0
2021	2	0
2023	4	0
Total	17	2

List of international goals scored by Júnior Sornoza
No.	Date	Venue	Opponent	Score	Result	Competition
1	6 September 2014	Lockhart Stadium, Fort Lauderdale, United States	Bolivia	4–0	4–0	Friendly
2	10 September 2019	Estadio Alejandro Serrano Aguilar, Cuenca, Ecuador	Bolivia	2–0	3–0	Friendly

== Honours ==
Corinthians

- Campeonato Paulista: 2019

LDU Quito

- Supercopa Ecuador: 2020

Independiente Del Valle

- Serie A: 2021, 2025, 2026
- Copa Sudamericana: 2022
- Copa Ecuador: 2022
- Supercopa Ecuador: 2023, 2026
- Recopa Sudamericana: 2023

=== Individual ===
- Campeonato Carioca Team of the year: 2017
