= Walberto Caicedo =

Ecuadorian football forward (born 1992)

Personal information
- Full name: Walberto Rolando Caicedo Caicedo
- Date of birth: 21 August 1992 (age 34)
- Place of birth: Guayaquil, Ecuador
- Height: 1.79 m (5 ft 10 in)
- Position: Forward

Team information
- Current team: Club 9 de Octubre

Youth career
- Emelec

Senior career*
Years	Team	Apps	(Gls)
2011–2015	Emelec	0	(0)
2011	→ LDU Quevedo (loan)	13	(11)
2012	→ CD Ferroviarios (loan)	3	(0)
2013–2014	→ Emelec B		
2015	Guayaquil SC	18	(12)
2016–2017	Metalac Gornji Milanovac	36	(7)
2017–2018	Guayaquil City	12	(0)
2018	→ Deportivo Anzoátegui (loan)	5	(0)
2019–2022	9 de Octubre	83	(43)
2023	Sport Boys	6	(0)
2023	Libertad	9	(1)
2024–	9 de Octubre	33	(10)
- * Club domestic league appearances and goals as of 30 October 2024

Walberto Rolando Caicedo Caicedo (born 21 August 1992) is an Ecuadorian football forward who plays for 9 de Octubre.

== Club career ==
He changed several clubs in home country as a loaned player of Club Sport Emelec. In 2014, he was incorporated into the first-team and became part of Emelec championship-winning squad. Lacking space in the team, he was an unused substitute on two occasions, so at the end of the season he left Emelec and moved this time abroad. Caicedo moved to Serbian side FK Metalac Gornji Milanovac. He arrived to Serbia as an anonymous foreigner who will need to fight to earn a spot in the starting line-up, however, as soon as he got a chance, he scored his first goal for Metalac on his SuperLiga debut, on away match against Čukarički, played on 19 February 2016. He became the joker substitute Metalac coach Nenad Vanić used to break opponent teams defences in the second half of the games in the following two league games. The fourth one was the one Caicedo got the chance to be a starter, and he corresponded by scoring the first goal of the game after only 14 minutes, a goal that ended up being crucial for Metalac to get a point in a 26-round 2–2 draw home against FK Rad. In summer 2017 Caicdedo returned to Ecuador and joined Guayaquil City. In March 2018 he joined Venezuelan side Deportivo Anzoátegui

== Career statistics ==
=== Club ===
As of 30 October 2024

Club	Division	League			National cup		Continental		Total	
Club	Division	Season	Apps	Goals	Apps	Goals	Apps	Goals	Apps	Goals
Emelec	1.ª	2010	0	0	—		—		0	0
Emelec	1.ª	2011	0	0	—		—		0	0
LDU Quevedo	3.ª	2011	13	11	—		—		13	11
CD Ferroviarios	2.ª	2012	3	0	—		—		3	0
Emelec	1.ª	2012	0	0	—		—		0	0
Emelec	1.ª	2013	0	0	—		—		0	0
Emelec	1.ª	2014	0	0	—		—		0	0
Emelec	1.ª	2015	0	0	—		—		0	0
Emelec	Total		0	0	0	0	0	0	0	0
Guayaquil SC	3.ª	2015	18	12	—		—		18	12
Metalac Gornji Milanovac	1.ª	2015-16	15	5	—		—		15	5
Metalac Gornji Milanovac	1.ª	2016-17	21	2	—		—		21	2
Metalac Gornji Milanovac	Total		36	7	0	0	0	0	36	7
Guayaquil City	1.ª	2017	4	0	—		—		4	0
Deportivo Anzoátegui	1.ª	2018	5	0	—		—		5	0
Guayaquil City	1.ª	2018	8	0	—		—		8	0
Guayaquil City	Total		12	0	0	0	0	0	12	0
9 de Octubre	3.ª	2019	27	32	—		—		27	32
9 de Octubre	2.ª	2020	17	7	—		—		17	7
9 de Octubre	1.ª	2021	15	3	1	0	—		16	3
9 de Octubre	1.ª	2022	24	1	7	3	7	1	38	5
Sport Boys	1.ª	2023	6	0	0	0	—		6	0
Libertad	1.ª	2023	9	1	0	0	—		9	1
9 de Octubre	2.ª	2024	33	10	0	0	—		33	10
9 de Octubre	Total		116	53	8	3	7	1	131	57
Career total			218	84	8	3	7	1	233	88

== Honors ==
Emelec

- Ecuadorian Serie A: 2014

9 de Octubre

- Ecuadorian Serie B: 2020
