= 2022 Copa Ecuador =

Copa Ecuador Ecuabet 2022

Tournament details
- Country: Ecuador
- Dates: 6 May – 8 November 2022
- Teams: 48

Final positions
- Champions: Independiente del Valle (1st title)
- Runners-up: 9 de Octubre
- Copa Libertadores: El Nacional

Tournament statistics
- Matches played: 73
- Goals scored: 169 (2.32 per match)
- Top goal scorer: Gabriel Cortez (6 goals)

The 2022 Copa Ecuador (officially known as the Copa Ecuador Ecuabet 2022 for sponsorship purposes) was the third edition of the Copa Ecuador, Ecuador's domestic football cup. It began on 6 May 2022 and ended with the single-legged final on 8 November 2022.

Independiente del Valle won their first title in the competition, defeating 9 de Octubre in the final by a 3–1 score. LDU Quito were the defending champions, having won the previous edition of the competition in 2019, but were knocked out by Imbabura in the round of 16.

== Format ==
The competition involved 48 teams and was divided into six rounds. The first round was played by the 10 Serie B teams, the 20 provincial association champions, and the amateur champion and runner-up teams, which were drawn into 16 double-legged ties. The 16 winners advanced to the round of 32, where they were drawn against the 16 Serie A teams in single-legged ties with the lower-tier side hosting the match.

The round of 16 and the quarter-finals were also played as single-legged ties by the winners of the preceding rounds, whilst the four quarter-final winners played a semi-final group stage with each team playing the others in the group twice. The top two teams in the semi-final group advanced to the final.

== Prizes ==
The champions of this edition qualified for the 2023 Supercopa Ecuador and would also earn the right to compete in the 2023 Copa Libertadores, taking the Ecuador 4 berth in that competition. In case the champions qualified for the Copa Libertadores through their league or international performance, the berth would be transferred to the runners-up, the semi-finalists (provided they were Serie A teams for the following season), or the next best team in the Ecuadorian Serie A not yet qualified for that competition.

== Schedule ==
Round	Draw date	First leg	Second leg
First round	22 April 2022	6–15 May 2022	20–29 May 2022; 12 June 2022
Round of 32	22 April 2022	3 June – 13 July 2022	
Round of 16	22 April 2022	3–26 July 2022	
Quarter-finals	22 April 2022	27 July – 4 August 2022	
Semi-final	22 April 2022	17 August – 2 November 2022	
Final	22 April 2022	8 November 2022 (Quito)	

== Teams ==
48 clubs took part in this edition of the Copa Ecuador: 16 from the Serie A, 10 from the Serie B, 20 from the Segunda Categoría, and 2 amateur teams.

=== Serie A ===
- 9 de Octubre
- Aucas
- Barcelona
- Cumbayá
- Delfín
- Deportivo Cuenca
- Emelec
- Gualaceo
- Guayaquil City
- Independiente del Valle
- LDU Quito
- Macará
- Mushuc Runa
- Orense
- Técnico Universitario
- Universidad Católica

=== Serie B ===
- América de Quito
- Atlético Santo Domingo
- Búhos ULVR
- Chacaritas
- El Nacional
- Imbabura
- Independiente Juniors
- Libertad
- Manta
- Olmedo

=== Segunda Categoría ===
- Aampetra
- Atlético Samborondón
- Bonita Banana
- Danubio
- Deportivo Santo Domingo
- Dunamis 04
- Estudiantes
- Independiente Azogues
- Insutec
- La Unión
- Leones del Norte
- Orellanense
- Peñarol
- Portoviejo
- Primero de Mayo
- Santa Elena Sumpa
- Unibolívar
- Unión Manabita
- Universitario
- Vargas Torres

=== Amateur teams ===
- 7 de Febrero
- Quito

== First round ==
- Teams entering this round: 10 teams from Serie B, 20 teams from Segunda Categoría, and 2 amateur teams.

Team 1	Agg.	Team 2	1st leg	2nd leg
Unión Manabita (3)	2–1	Santa Elena Sumpa (3)	1–0	1–1
Atlético Samborondón (3)	1–0	Universitario (3)	1–0	0–0
Leones del Norte (3)	7–0	Estudiantes (3)	4–0	3–0
Dunamis 04 (3)	1–4	La Unión (3)	0–2	1–2
Danubio (3)	1–6	Portoviejo (3)	0–2	1–4
Manta (2)	4–1	7 de Febrero (A)	3–0	1–1
Peñarol (3)	1–0	Unibolívar (3)	0–0	1–0
Imbabura (2)	7–2	Orellanense (3)	3–0	4–2
Búhos ULVR (2)	0–0 (1–3 p)	Aampetra (3)	0–0	0–0
El Nacional (2)	4–0	Primero de Mayo (3)	3–0	1–0
Atlético Santo Domingo (2)	1–4	Vargas Torres (3)	1–1	0–3
Libertad (2)	2–2 (18–19 p)	Bonita Banana (3)	0–0	2–2
Olmedo (2)	5–0	Quito (A)	3–0	2–0
Independiente Juniors (2)	2–0	Independiente Azogues (3)	1–0	1–0
Chacaritas (2)	2–2 (3–1 p)	Deportivo Santo Domingo (3)	1–1	1–1
América de Quito (2)	1–2	Insutec (3)	0–0	1–2

Notes

1. The Aampetra v Búhos ULVR match, originally scheduled to be played on 27 May 2022 at Estadio Rumiñahui in Sangolquí had been awarded to Búhos ULVR by walkover due to failures in the stadium's lighting system. However, Aampetra successfully appealed and the match was rescheduled to 12 June 2022.

== Round of 32 ==
- Teams entering this round: 16 teams from Serie A. The team from the lower tier hosted the match.

3 June 2022	Independiente Juniors (2)	1–1 (2–4 p)	Delfín (1)	Quito
19:00 UTC−5	Lugo 90+3'	Report	J. Corozo 59'	Stadium: Banco Guayaquil; Referee: Anthony Díaz
	Penalties
	Lugo (penalty scored); De la Cruz (penalty scored); Sagardia (penalty missed); Bustamante (penalty missed)		(penalty scored) Bazzana; (penalty scored) Petryk; (penalty scored) Mieles; (penalty scored) J. Corozo

4 June 2022	Vargas Torres (3)	2–2 (4–2 p)	Técnico Universitario (1)	Esmeraldas
12:00 UTC−5	Márquez 21' (pen.); C. Estupiñán 38'	Report	Tapiero 5' (pen.), 83'	Stadium: Folke Anderson; Referee: René Marín
	Penalties
	Cheré (penalty scored); C. Estupiñán (penalty scored); J. Torres (penalty scored); Plúas (penalty scored)		(penalty scored) Tapiero; (penalty scored) E. Rodríguez; (penalty missed) Carcelén; (penalty missed) Santacruz

5 June 2022	La Unión (3)	2–0	Macará (1)	Pujilí
12:00 UTC−5	Mejía 83' (pen.); Congo 90+3'	Report		Stadium: La Unión; Referee: Erik Ruiz

5 June 2022	Manta (2)	0–1	LDU Quito (1)	Manta
15:30 UTC−5		Report	N. Angulo 70'	Stadium: Jocay; Referee: Carlos Aroca

10 June 2022	Peñarol (3)	2–4	Orense (1)	Riobamba
19:00 UTC−5	Fábio Renato 70'; Aguilera 90+1'	Report	Andrade 43', 78'; Montaño 58'; J. Molina 90+3'	Stadium: Olímpico; Referee: Carlos Bayas

11 June 2022	Portoviejo (3)	0–1	9 de Octubre (1)	Portoviejo
12:00 UTC−5		Report	W. Caicedo 18'	Stadium: Reales Tamarindos; Referee: Wellington Arauz

11 June 2022	Bonita Banana (3)	1–1 (5–4 p)	Deportivo Cuenca (1)	Pasaje
15:30 UTC−5	J. Ayoví 67' (pen.)	Report	Mancinelli 57'	Stadium: Carlos Falquez Batallas; Referee: Robert Cabrera
	Penalties
	J. Ayoví (penalty scored); Muñoz (penalty scored); Montaño (penalty scored); García (penalty scored); Matamoros (penalty scored)		(penalty scored) Becerra; (penalty scored) E. Mera; (penalty missed) García Basso; (penalty scored) F. Mera; (penalty scored) Mancinelli

12 June 2022	Leones del Norte (3)	1–4	Aucas (1)	Ibarra
12:00 UTC−5	Ortiz 90+1' (pen.)	Report	Fydriszewski 17', 49'; Figueroa 71'; Tévez 85'	Stadium: Olímpico; Referee: Roque Véliz

12 June 2022	Insutec (3)	0–2	Gualaceo (1)	Quevedo
15:00 UTC−5		Report	Alles 45+1'; B. Angulo 90+2'	Stadium: Arena La Victoria; Referee: Lenín Quiñónez

24 June 2022	Atlético Samborondón (3)	0–2	Independiente del Valle (1)	Guayaquil
15:30 UTC−5		Report	Chávez 67'; M. Angulo 90+5'	Stadium: Alejandro Ponce Noboa; Referee: Guillermo Guerrero
Note: Match originally scheduled for 17 June 2022, 15:30 local time, but suspended and rescheduled due to social unrest in Ecuador.

30 June 2022	Aampetra (3)	2–0	Universidad Católica (1)	Sangolquí
14:30 UTC−5	Herrera 58'; Ocles 90+1'	Report		Stadium: Rumiñahui; Referee: Gorky Araujo
Note: Match originally scheduled for 4 June 2022, 15:00 local time at Estadio Pablo Sandiford in Durán, but suspended and rescheduled due to the rescheduling of the first stage match between Aampetra and Búhos ULVR as well as social unrest in Ecuador.

2 July 2022	Chacaritas (2)	0–2	Cumbayá (1)	Pelileo
12:00 UTC−5		Report	Suárez 44'; Monges 75' (pen.)	Stadium: Ciudad de Pelileo; Referee: Carlos Bayas
Note: Match originally scheduled for 19 June 2022, 15:00 local time, but suspended and rescheduled due to social unrest in Ecuador.

2 July 2022	Imbabura (2)	1–1 (2–1 p)	Guayaquil City (1)	Ibarra
15:00 UTC−5	Pantoja 29'	Report	Parrales 2'	Stadium: Olímpico; Referee: Franklin Congo
	Penalties
	Pantoja (penalty scored); Castro (penalty missed); R. Caicedo (penalty missed); Mendoza (penalty scored)		(penalty missed) Klebinho; (penalty missed) Humanante; (penalty missed) A. Quiñónez; (penalty scored) Ramon; (penalty missed) Rezabala
Note: Match originally scheduled for 19 June 2022, 18:00 local time, but suspended and rescheduled due to social unrest in Ecuador.

2 July 2022	El Nacional (2)	2–1	Barcelona (1)	Quito
18:00 UTC−5	Nazareno 12'; Solís 26'	Report	N. Molina 33'	Stadium: Olímpico Atahualpa; Referee: Roberto Sánchez
Note: Match originally scheduled for 18 June 2022, 18:00 local time, but suspended and rescheduled due to social unrest in Ecuador.

3 July 2022	Olmedo (2)	1–2	Mushuc Runa (1)	Riobamba
18:00 UTC−5	Posligua 29' (pen.)	Report	Uchuari 2'; Monaga 62'	Stadium: Olímpico; Referee: Kevin Pazmiño
Note: Match originally scheduled for 19 June 2022, 12:00 local time, but suspended and rescheduled due to social unrest in Ecuador.

13 July 2022	Unión Manabita (3)	0–5	Emelec (1)	Shushufindi
15:00 UTC−5		Report	Pittón 51', 54'; Quiroga 53', 90+4'; Lastre 87'	Stadium: Municipal; Referee: Mario Romero
Note: Match originally scheduled for 18 June 2022, 12:00 local time but suspended due to social unrest in Ecuador.

== Round of 16 ==
3 July 2022	Vargas Torres (3)	0–0 (5–4 p)	Aampetra (3)	Esmeraldas
12:00 UTC−5		Report		Stadium: Folke Anderson; Referee: Augusto Aragón
	Penalties
	Márquez (penalty scored); C. Estupiñán (penalty scored); J. Torres (penalty scored); Plúas (penalty scored); Cabeza (penalty scored)		(penalty scored) León; (penalty scored) Ocles; (penalty scored) Herrera; (penalty scored) González; (penalty missed) Ortiz

3 July 2022	La Unión (3)	0–0 (8–9 p)	Independiente del Valle (1)	Pujilí
15:00 UTC−5		Report		Stadium: La Unión; Referee: Mario Romero
	Penalties
	J. Rodríguez (penalty scored); Álvarez (penalty scored); Núñez (penalty scored); Morales (penalty scored); Mejía (penalty scored); D. Rodríguez (penalty scored); Cabezas (penalty scored); R. Caicedo (penalty scored); Arroyo (penalty missed)		(penalty scored) Chávez; (penalty scored) Bauman; (penalty scored) Gaibor; (penalty scored) Faravelli; (penalty scored) Segovia; (penalty scored) M. Ortiz; (penalty scored) Schunke; (penalty scored) Ochoa; (penalty scored) Arce

4 July 2022	9 de Octubre (1)	1–1 (5–4 p)	Orense (1)	Milagro
19:00 UTC−5	Cortez 14'	Report	Jaramillo 45+1' (o.g.)	Stadium: Los Chirijos; Referee: Anthony Díaz
	Penalties
	Cortez (penalty scored); Arroyo (penalty scored); Jaramillo (penalty scored); W. Caicedo (penalty scored); Montero (penalty scored)		(penalty scored) Acosta; (penalty missed) Kouffati; (penalty scored) Burbano; (penalty scored) J. Angulo; (penalty scored) Villagra

5 July 2022	Delfín (1)	2–0	Gualaceo (1)	Manta
16:00 UTC−5	Vélez 83'; Chicaiza 90+1'	Report		Stadium: Jocay; Referee: Marlon Vera

10 July 2022	Bonita Banana (3)	1–1 (4–5 p)	El Nacional (2)	Pasaje
12:00 UTC−5	Suárez 3'	Report	Tana 14'	Stadium: Carlos Falquez Batallas; Referee: Luis Quiroz
	Penalties
	J. Ayoví (penalty scored); Muñoz (penalty scored); Montaño (penalty scored); García (penalty scored); Matamoros (penalty missed); Suárez (penalty missed)		(penalty scored) Carrillo; (penalty scored) Tana; (penalty scored) Oñate; (penalty missed) R. Cabezas; (penalty scored) L. Chalá; (penalty scored) J. Chalá

19 July 2022	Imbabura (2)	2–1	LDU Quito (1)	Ibarra
19:00 UTC−5	Pantoja 3'; K. Rodríguez 68'	Report	Hoyos 16'	Stadium: Olímpico; Referee: Marlon Vera

20 July 2022	Mushuc Runa (1)	1–0	Cumbayá (1)	Ambato
19:00 UTC−5	Delgado 90+3'	Report		Stadium: Bellavista; Referee: Roddy Zambrano

26 July 2022	Emelec (1)	0–2	Aucas (1)	Guayaquil
19:00 UTC−5		Report	Segura 14'; López 90+4'	Stadium: George Capwell; Referee: Roberto Sánchez

== Quarter-finals ==
27 July 2022	Imbabura (2)	1–3	Independiente del Valle (1)	Ibarra
19:00 UTC−5	Pantoja 90+6' (pen.)	Report	Díaz 19'; Minda 71'; Ortiz 90+15'	Stadium: Olímpico; Referee: Augusto Aragón

3 August 2022	Vargas Torres (3)	0–1	Mushuc Runa (1)	Esmeraldas
15:00 UTC−5		Report	Alonso 21'	Stadium: Folke Anderson; Referee: Juan Carlos Andrade

3 August 2022	El Nacional (2)	3–1	Delfín (1)	Quito
19:00 UTC−5	Ordóñez 45+1' (pen.); Carrillo 71'; Valencia 77'	Report	Alman 6'	Stadium: Olímpico Atahualpa; Referee: Guillermo Guerrero

4 August 2022	9 de Octubre (1)	2–0	Aucas (1)	Milagro
19:00 UTC−5	W. Caicedo 2'; Cortez 77' (pen.)	Report		Stadium: Los Chirijos; Referee: Luis Quiroz

== Semi-final ==
Pos	Team	Pld	W	D	L	GF	GA	GD	Pts	Qualification	IDV	9OC	NAC	MUS
1	Independiente del Valle (1)	6	4	1	1	12	8	+4	13	Advance to the Final	—	1–0	3–1	1–1
2	9 de Octubre (1)	6	2	1	3	7	6	+1	7	Advance to the Final	4–1	—	0–0	2–0
3	El Nacional (2)	6	2	1	3	6	8	−2	7	Qualification for Copa Libertadores first stage (Note: Since the eventual champions Independiente del Valle had already qualified for the 2023 Copa Libertadores and the eventual runners-up 9 de Octubre were ineligible to qualify due to their relegation from Serie A at the end of the season, the Copa Libertadores first stage berth was taken by the best eligible semi-finalist, El Nacional.)	0–2	2–0	—	1–0
4	Mushuc Runa (1)	6	2	1	3	8	11	−3	7		2–4	2–1	3–2	—

Source: FEF
Rules for classification: 1) Points, 2) Goal difference, 3) Goals for, 4) Goals against, 5) Head-to-head results, 6) 2022 Copa Ecuador general table of qualified teams.

== Final ==
8 November 2022
19:00 UTC−5

Independiente del Valle (1)	3–1	9 de Octubre (1)
Carabajal 1'; Schunke 30'; Ayoví 58'	Report	Montero 85' (pen.)

Estadio Olímpico Atahualpa, Quito
Referee: Guillermo Guerrero

== Top scorers ==
Rank	Name	Club	Goals
1	(Ecuador) Gabriel Cortez	9 de Octubre	6
2	(Ecuador) Jaime Ortiz	Leones del Norte	4
2	(Ecuador) Jhonnier Chalá	El Nacional	4
2	(Argentina) Jonatan Bauman	Independiente del Valle	4
2	(Argentina) Santiago Giordana	Mushuc Runa	4
6	(Ecuador) Walberto Caicedo	9 de Octubre	3
6	(Argentina) Lautaro Díaz	Independiente del Valle	3
6	(Ecuador) Leandro Pantoja	Imbabura	3

Source: FEF

== See also ==
- 2022 Ecuadorian Serie A
- 2022 Ecuadorian Serie B
- 2022 Segunda Categoría
