= Patrik Mercado =

Ecuadorian footballer (born 2003)

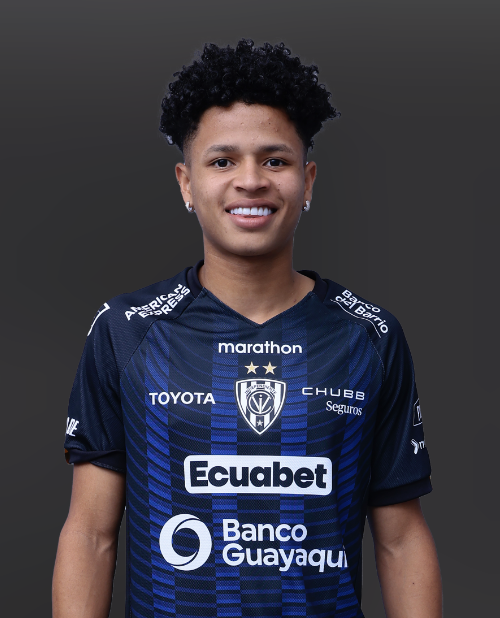

Personal information
- Full name: Patrik Kleiver Mercado Altamirano
- Date of birth: 31 July 2003 (age 23)
- Place of birth: Tena, Napo, Ecuador
- Height: 1.77 m (5 ft 10 in)
- Position: Midfielder

Team information
- Current team: Independiente del Valle
- Number: 7

Youth career
- Independiente del Valle

Senior career*
Years	Team	Apps	(Gls)
2021–2022	Independiente Juniors	21	(1)
2022–	Independiente del Valle	81	(8)

International career^{‡}
2022–2023	Ecuador U20	16	(2)
2024	Ecuador U23	4	(1)
2025–	Ecuador	3	(0)
Medal record
Men's football
Representing Ecuador
South American Games
Silver medal – second place	2022 Asunción	Team
- * Club domestic league appearances and goals as of 23:20, 21 February 2026 (UTC) ‡ National team caps and goals as of 22:45, 13 November 2025 (UTC)

Patrik Kleiver Mercado Altamirano (born 31 July 2003) is an Ecuadorian footballer who currently plays as a midfielder for Independiente del Valle and the Ecuador national team.

== Club career ==
=== Independiente del Valle ===
Born in Tena in the Napo Province of Ecuador, Mercado began his career with Independiente del Valle at the age of ten. He made his debut in Ecuador's second division in 2021 for Independiente's reserve team, Independiente Juniors, and followed this up with a first team debut on 30 May 2022, when he came on as a late substitute for Pedro Perlaza in Independiente's 1–1 draw with 9 de Octubre.

He remained with Independiente's under-20 squad for the U-20 Copa Libertadores in the following season, and suffered a concussion in their 1–0 victory against Colombian side Envigado. As a result of his participation in the competition, which Independiente lost in the final to Argentine side Boca Juniors, he was left out of Independiente's senior squad for a tour to Spain, alongside teammate Kendry Páez, with director Santiago Morales stating that the club would prefer the pair to "stay and rest in Ecuador". In September of the same year, he signed a contract extension with the club - a deal lasting until the end of the 2026 season.

By the 2025 season, Mercado had established himself in Independiente's first team, and was praised in Ecuadorian media for his performance in a 4–0 win over Brazilian club Vasco da Gama in the Copa Sudamericana round-of-sixteen match on 16 July, where he scored twice. These performances caught the attention of clubs outside of Ecuador, with Mercado being strongly linked with a move to Brazilian club Palmeiras at the end of July 2025.

On 26 February 2026, La Liga club Sevilla announced that they reached an agreement with Independiente del Valle for the transfer of Mercado, with the deal to be finalized in July. On 10 August, however, the club announced that the deal collapsed.

== International career ==
Mercado has represented Ecuador at under-20 and under-23 level, featuring in friendly matches for the under-23 squad in preparation for the 2024 CONMEBOL Pre-Olympic Tournament.

== Career statistics ==
=== Club ===
As of 21 February 2026.

Appearances and goals by club, season and competition
Club	Season	League			Cup (Note: Includes Copa Ecuador, Copa del Rey)		Continental		Other		Total	
Club	Season	Division	Apps	Goals	Apps	Goals	Apps	Goals	Apps	Goals	Apps	Goals
Independiente Juniors	2021	Ecuadorian Serie B	9	1	–		–		0	0	9	1
Independiente Juniors	2022	Ecuadorian Serie B	12	0	–		–		0	0	12	0
Independiente Juniors	Total		21	1	0	0	0	0	0	0	21	1
Independiente del Valle	2022	LigaPro Serie A	4	0	1	0	1 (Note: Appearances in the Copa Sudamericana)	0	0	0	6	0
Independiente del Valle	2023	LigaPro Serie A	23	2	0	0	6 (Note: Appearances in the Copa Libertadores)	0	1 (Note: Appearances in the Recopa Sudamericana)	0	30	2
Independiente del Valle	2024	LigaPro Serie A	21	2	5	0	5 (Note: Four appearances in the Copa Libertadores, one appearance in the Copa Sudamericana)	0	0	0	31	2
Independiente del Valle	2025	LigaPro Serie A	32	4	0	0	12 (Note: Six appearances and one goal in the Copa Libertadores, six appearances and two goals in the Copa Sudamericana)	3	0	0	44	7
Independiente del Valle	2026	LigaPro Serie A	1	0	0	0	0	0	0	0	1	0
Independiente del Valle	Total		81	8	6	0	24	3	1	0	112	11
Career total			102	9	6	0	24	3	1	0	133	12

=== International ===
As of match played 13 November 2025

Appearances and goals by national team and year
National team	Year	Apps	Goals
Ecuador	2025	3	0
Total		3	0
