= Jorge Pinos =

Ecuadorian footballer (born 1989)

Personal information
- Full name: Jorge Bladimir Pinos Haiman
- Date of birth: 3 October 1989 (age 37)
- Place of birth: Quevedo, Ecuador
- Height: 1.84 m (6 ft 0 in)
- Position: Goalkeeper

Youth career
- Palmeiras de Ecuador
- Omar FC
- 2007–2008: Barcelona SC

Senior career*
Years	Team	Apps	(Gls)
2008–2012	Barcelona SC	1	(0)
2009	→ Deportivo Quevedo (loan)	24	(3)
2011	→ Caribe Junior (loan)	7	(0)
2011	→ Orense (loan)	19	(0)
2013	Delfín	34	(0)
2014–2015	LDU Portoviejo	11	(0)
2017	Santa Rita	43	(0)
2018	Técnico Universitario	30	(0)
2019–2021	Independiente del Valle	37	(0)
2021–2023	9 de Octubre	33	(0)
2023–2024	Mushuc Runa	30	(0)
2025–2026	Cobresal	32	(0)

International career^{‡}
2021–	Ecuador	1	(0)
- * Club domestic league appearances and goals as of 14 July 2026 ‡ National team caps and goals as of 26 January 2022

Jorge Bladimir Pinos Haiman (born 3 October 1989) is an Ecuadorian footballer who plays as a goalkeeper.

== Career ==
Pinos signed with Chilean Primera División club Cobresal for the 2025 season. After disagreements with the coach, Gustavo Huerta, he left the club in July 2026.
