= Moisés Ramírez =

Ecuadorian footballer (born 2000)

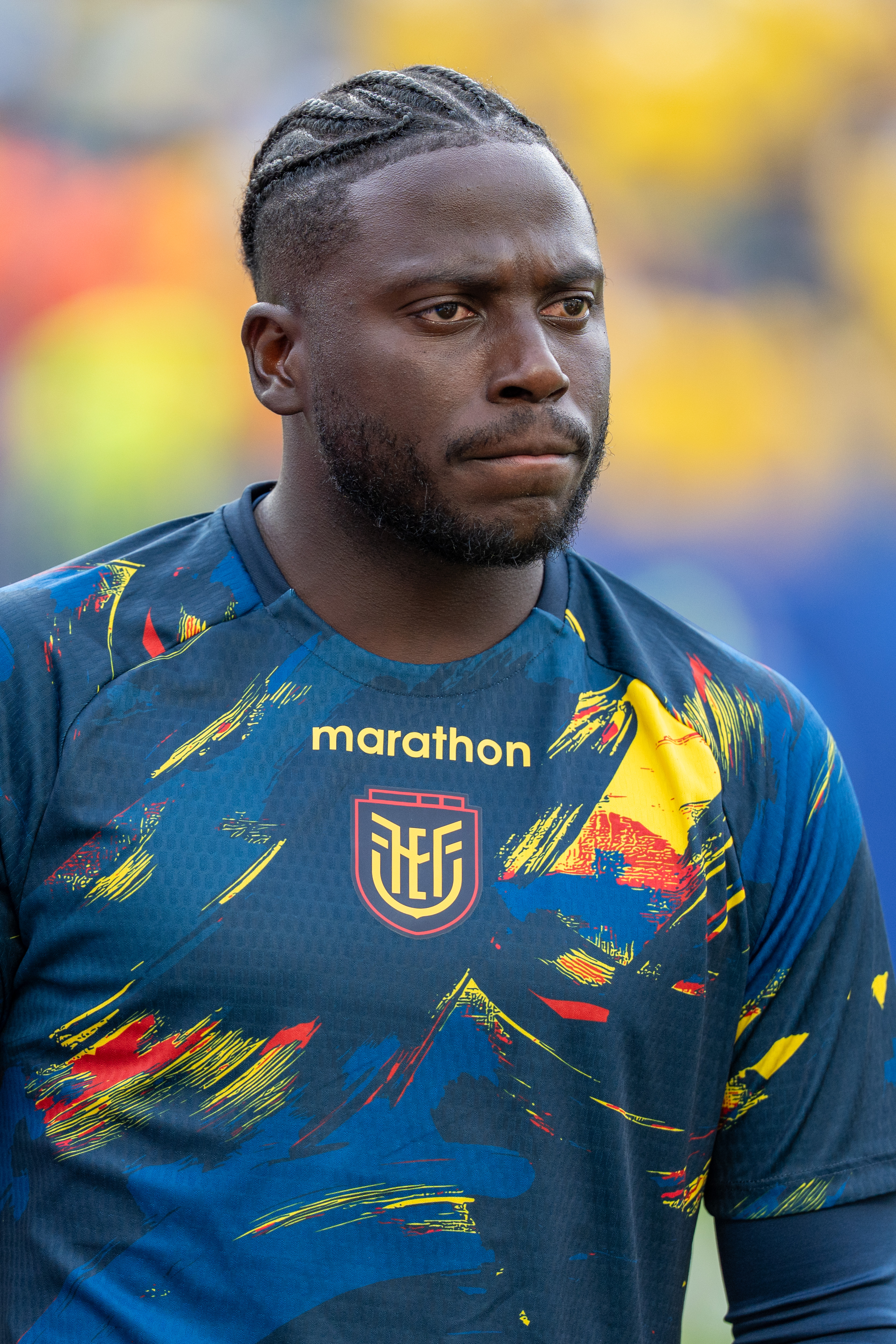
- Ramírez with Ecuador in 2026

Personal information
- Full name: Wellington Moisés Ramírez Preciado
- Date of birth: 9 September 2000 (age 26)
- Place of birth: Guayaquil, Ecuador
- Height: 1.85 m (6 ft 1 in)
- Position: Goalkeeper

Team information
- Current team: A.E. Kifisia
- Number: 99

Youth career
- 2012–2015: Toreros
- 2016–2018: Independiente del Valle

Senior career*
Years	Team	Apps	(Gls)
2018–2025	Independiente del Valle	106	(0)
2019	→ Real Sociedad B (loan)	18	(0)
2025–	A.E. Kifisia	33	(0)

International career^{‡}
2017	Ecuador U17	9	(0)
2018–2019	Ecuador U20	18	(0)
2020	Ecuador U23	4	(0)
2021–	Ecuador	7	(0)
Medal record
Men's football
Representing Ecuador
FIFA U-20 World Cup
Third place	2019 Poland
- * Club domestic league appearances and goals as of 19 September 2026 ‡ National team caps and goals as of 30 May 2026

Wellington Moisés Ramírez Preciado (born 9 September 2000) is an Ecuadorian professional footballer who plays as a goalkeeper for Super League Greece club A.E. Kifisia and the Ecuador national team.

== Club career ==
Born in Guayaquil, Ramírez joined Independiente del Valle's youth setup in 2016, from Toreros. He made his first team debut at the age of just 17 on 10 July 2018, starting in a 3–1 away loss against S.D. Aucas.

On 30 January 2019, Ramírez moved abroad and joined Real Sociedad on loan until June; he was initially assigned to the reserves in Segunda División B. His loan was extended until 31 December on 28 June, with a buyout clause, which was declined on 10 December.

Upon returning, Ramírez was assigned back at the main squad, being mainly a backup to Jorge Pinos.

== International career ==
Ramírez made his debut for the Ecuador national team on 7 October 2021 in a World Cup qualifier against Bolivia.

He was named in the Ecuadorian squad for the 2022 FIFA World Cup.

Ramírez was called up to the final 26-man Ecuador squad for the 2024 Copa América.

On 31 May 2026, Ramírez was selected in the 26-man squad for the 2026 FIFA World Cup.

== Career statistics ==
=== Club ===
As of 21 May 2026

Appearances and goals by club, season and competition
Club	Season	League			Cup		Continental		Other		Total	
Club	Season	Division	Apps	Goals	Apps	Goals	Apps	Goals	Apps	Goals	Apps	Goals
Independiente del Valle	2016	LigaPro Serie A	0	0	—		—		—		0	0
Independiente del Valle	2018	LigaPro Serie A	8	0	—		0	0	—		8	0
Independiente del Valle	2020	LigaPro Serie A	11	0	—		0	0	0	0	11	0
Independiente del Valle	2021	LigaPro Serie A	29	0	—		12	0	0	0	41	0
Independiente del Valle	2022	LigaPro Serie A	28	0	9	0	13	0	—		50	0
Independiente del Valle	2023	LigaPro Serie A	23	0	—		6	0	3	0	32	0
Independiente del Valle	2024	LigaPro Serie A	17	0	3	0	7	0	—		27	0
Independiente del Valle	2025	LigaPro Serie A	6	0	0	0	0	0	—		6	0
Independiente del Valle	Total		122	0	12	0	38	0	3	0	175	0
Real Sociedad B (loan)	2018–19	Segunda División B	4	0	—		—		—		4	0
Real Sociedad B (loan)	2019–20	Segunda División B	14	0	—		—		—		14	0
Real Sociedad B (loan)	Total		18	0	—		—		—		18	0
Kifisia	2025–26	Super League Greece	28	0	2	0	—		—		30	0
Career total			168	0	14	0	38	0	3	0	223	0

=== International ===
As of 30 May 2026

Ecuador
Year	Apps	Goals
2021	2	0
2023	4	0
2026	1	0
Total	7	0
