= Anthony Landázuri =

Ecuadorian footballer (born 1997)

Personal information
- Full name: Anthony Rigoberto Landázuri Estacio
- Date of birth: 19 April 1997 (age 29)
- Place of birth: Esmeraldas, Ecuador
- Height: 1.78 m (5 ft 10 in)
- Position: Right back

Team information
- Current team: Tenerife
- Number: 12

Youth career
- 2010: Norte América
- 2011–2015: Independiente del Valle

Senior career*
Years	Team	Apps	(Gls)
2015–2021	Independiente del Valle	89	(4)
2022	Fortaleza	20	(0)
2023–2024	Independiente del Valle	43	(2)
2025–	Tenerife	47	(2)

International career^{‡}
2016	Ecuador U20	2	(0)
2020–2021	Ecuador U23	4	(0)
- * Club domestic league appearances and goals as of 9 June 2026 ‡ National team caps and goals as of 28 January 2020

Anthony Rigoberto Landázuri Estacio (born 19 April 1997) is an Ecuadorian footballer who plays as right back for Spanish Segunda División club Tenerife.

== Club career ==
=== Independiente del Valle ===
Born in Esmeraldas, Landázuri joined Independiente del Valle's youth setup in 2011, from Norte América. He made his first team debut on 28 November 2015, starting in a 3–3 Serie A home draw against Barcelona SC.

Landázuri scored his first senior goal on 13 December 2015, netting his team's second in a 3–4 away loss against LDU Quito. After being a backup option, he started to feature more regularly from the 2019 season onwards.

=== Fortaleza ===
On 14 December 2021, Landázuri moved abroad and signed a two-year contract with Campeonato Brasileiro Série A side Fortaleza. After only one year playing for the Brazilian club, on 15 December 2022, Landázuri asked for a contract termination.

=== Independiente del Valle second stint ===
Right after leaving Fortaleza Landázuri returned to his former club Ecuadorian club Independiente del Valle signing a two-year contract.

=== Tenerife ===
On 3 February 2025, Landázuri signed a two-and-a-half-year contract with Tenerife in the Spanish Segunda División.

== Career statistics ==
As of 11 January 2023

Appearances and goals by club, season and competition
Club	Season	League			Cup		Continental		Other		Total	
Club	Season	Division	Apps	Goals	Apps	Goals	Apps	Goals	Apps	Goals	Apps	Goals
Independiente del Valle	2015	Ecuadorian Serie A	4	1	—		—		—		4	1
Independiente del Valle	2016	Ecuadorian Serie A	15	0	—		0	0	—		15	0
Independiente del Valle	2017	Ecuadorian Serie A	5	0	—		1 (Note: Appearance(s) in Copa Libertadores)	0	—		6	0
Independiente del Valle	2018	Ecuadorian Serie A	2	0	—		1	0	—		3	0
Independiente del Valle	2019	Ecuadorian Serie A	26	2	—		9 (Note: Appearance(s) in Copa Sudamericana)	0	—		35	2
Independiente del Valle	2020	Ecuadorian Serie A	16	0	—		3	0	0	0	19	0
Independiente del Valle	2021	Ecuadorian Serie A	21	1	—		8 (Note: Seven appearances in Copa Libertadores, one appearance in Copa Sudamericana)	0	1 (Note: Appearance(s) in Supercopa Ecuador)	2	30	3
Independiente del Valle	Total		89	4	—		22	0	1	2	112	6
Fortaleza	2022	Série A	7	0	1	0	2	0	10 (Note: Three appearances in Campeonato Cearense, seven appearances in Copa do Nordeste)	0	20	0
Career total			96	4	1	0	24	0	11	2	132	6

== Honours ==
Independiente del Valle

- Copa Sudamericana: 2019
- Ecuadorian Serie A: 2021

Fortaleza

- Copa do Nordeste: 2022
- Campeonato Cearense: 2022
