= Agustín García Basso =

Argentine footballer

Personal information
- Full name: Agustín Eugenio García Basso
- Date of birth: 26 March 1992 (age 34)
- Place of birth: Vedia, Argentina
- Height: 1.78 m (5 ft 10 in)
- Position: Defender

Team information
- Current team: Universidad Católica

Youth career
- Deportivo MacAllister

Senior career*
Years	Team	Apps	(Gls)
2011–2012	Deportivo MacAllister	–	(–)
2012–2015	Boca Juniors	1	(0)
2013–2014	→ Douglas Haig (loan)	26	(0)
2015	Sportivo Belgrano	30	(0)
2016–2017	Santamarina	61	(1)
2017–2020	Agropecuario	20	(0)
2020–2021	Estudiantes BA	5	(0)
2021–2022	Quilmes	35	(1)
2022–2023	Deportivo Cuenca	22	(2)
2023–2024	Independiente del Valle	27	(2)
2024–2026	Racing Club	52	(1)
2026–	Universidad Católica	0	(0)
- * Club domestic league appearances and goals as of 17:50, 28 June 2026 (UTC)

Agustín Eugenio García Basso (born 26 March 1992) is an Argentine professional footballer who plays as a defender for Chilean club Universidad Católica.

== Career ==
García Basso began his career with Deportivo MacAllister, notably featuring in senior football in Liga Cultural de Fútbol, prior to signing for Boca Juniors. He was moved into Boca's first-team squad towards the end of the 2012–13 Argentine Primera División season, making his professional debut on 11 May 2013 during a 3–0 loss away to San Lorenzo. He appeared as an unused substitute in two further matches in 2012–13 as Boca Juniors finished nineteenth in the Torneo Final. In July 2013, García Basso was loaned to Douglas Haig of Primera B Nacional. Twenty-six appearances followed across the 2013–14 season.

Sportivo Belgrano completed the permanent signing of García Basso on 2 February 2015. He was subsequently selected in thirty fixtures. The 2016 Primera B Nacional campaign saw García Basso sign for Santamarina, with the defender scoring his first senior goal on his Santamarina debut on 30 January against Juventud Unida. On 5 August 2017, following sixty-four games for Santamarina, García Basso departed to join fellow Primera B Nacional team Agropecuario. He departed in June 2020.

On 13 August 2026, García Basso signed with Chilean club Universidad Católica on a deal until the end of the year.

== Personal life ==
García Basso is the grandson of former professional footballer Oscar Basso.

== Career statistics ==
As of 23 June 2020.

Club statistics
Club	Season	League			Cup		League Cup		Continental		Other		Total	
Club	Season	Division	Apps	Goals	Apps	Goals	Apps	Goals	Apps	Goals	Apps	Goals	Apps	Goals
Boca Juniors	2012–13	Primera División	1	0	0	0	—		0	0	0	0	1	0
Boca Juniors	2013–14	Primera División	0	0	0	0	—		—		0	0	0	0
Boca Juniors	2014	Primera División	0	0	0	0	—		0	0	0	0	0	0
Boca Juniors	Total		1	0	0	0	—		0	0	0	0	1	0
Douglas Haig (loan)	2013–14	Primera B Nacional	26	0	0	0	—		—		0	0	26	0
Sportivo Belgrano	2015	Primera B Nacional	30	0	0	0	—		—		0	0	30	0
Santamarina	2016	Primera B Nacional	19	1	0	0	—		—		0	0	19	1
Santamarina	2016–17	Primera B Nacional	42	0	3	0	—		—		0	0	45	0
Santamarina	Total		61	1	3	0	—		—		0	0	64	1
Agropecuario	2017–18	Primera B Nacional	4	0	0	0	—		—		3 (Note: Appearance(s) in Primera B Nacional play-offs)	0	7	0
Agropecuario	2018–19	Primera B Nacional	2	0	0	0	—		—		0	0	2	0
Agropecuario	2019–20	Primera B Nacional	14	0	0	0	—		—		0	0	14	0
Agropecuario	Total		20	0	0	0	—		—		3	0	23	0
Career total			138	1	3	0	—		0	0	3	0	144	1

== Honours ==
Racing

- Copa Sudamericana: 2024
