= Beder Caicedo =

Ecuadorian footballer (born 1992)

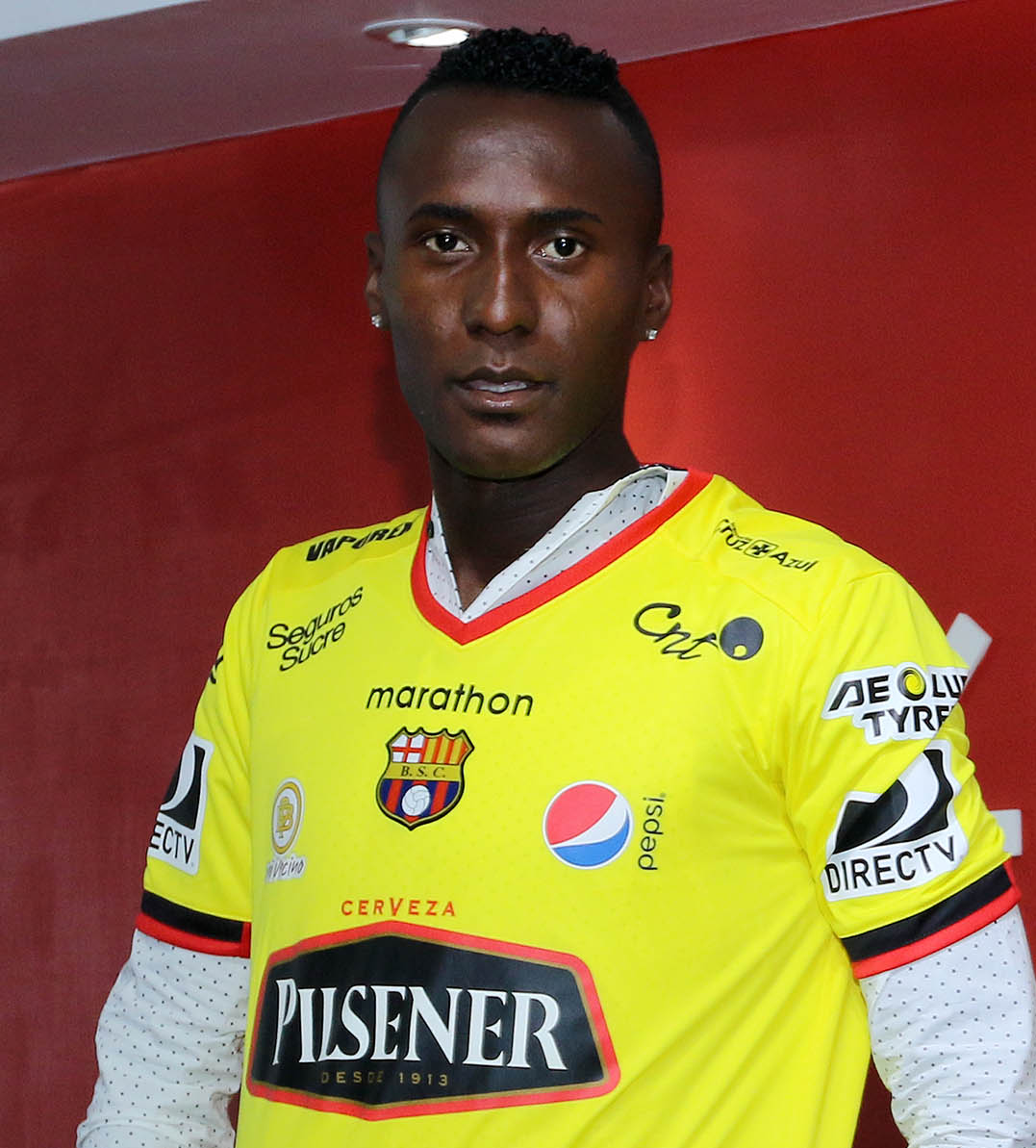
- Caicedo with Barcelona SC in 2016

Personal information
- Full name: Beder Julio Caicedo Lastra
- Date of birth: 13 May 1992 (age 34)
- Place of birth: San Lorenzo, Ecuador
- Height: 1.80 m (5 ft 11 in)
- Position: Left-back

Team information
- Current team: Orense
- Number: 15

Senior career*
Years	Team	Apps	(Gls)
2010	Abuelos	6	(1)
2011	Deportivo Coca	8	(3)
2012	Espoli	31	(2)
2013	América de Quito	0	(0)
2014	Espoli	34	(4)
2015	Técnico Universitario	39	(2)
2016	Delfín	34	(0)
2017–2019	Barcelona SC	55	(1)
2020–2024	Independiente del Valle	73	(2)
2025–	Orense	21	(0)

International career^{‡}
2018–	Ecuador	10	(1)
- * Club domestic league appearances and goals as of 20 August 2025 ‡ National team caps and goals as of 18 October 2023

Beder Julio Caicedo Lastra (born 13 May 1992) is an Ecuadorian professional footballer who plays as a left-back for Orense.

== Career statistics ==
=== Club ===
As of 4 August 2024

Appearances and goals by club, season and competition
Club	Season	League			Cup		Continental		Other		Total	
Club	Season	Division	Apps	Goals	Apps	Goals	Apps	Goals	Apps	Goals	Apps	Goals
Abuelos	2010	Segunda Categoría	6	1	—		—		8< (Note: Appearance(s) in Campeonato Provincial de Segunda Categoría de Orellana)	4	14	5
Deportivo Coca	2011	Segunda Categoría	8	3	—		—		7	3	15	6
Espoli	2012	Serie B	31	2	—		—		—		31	2
América de Quito	2013	Segunda Provincial	—		—		—		14 (Note: Appearance(s) in Campeonato Provincial de Segunda Categoría de Pichincha)	0	14	0
Espoli	2014	Serie B	34	4	—		—		—		34	4
Técnico Universitario	2015	Serie B	39	2	—		—		—		39	2
Delfín	2016	Serie A	34	0	—		—		—		34	0
Barcelona SC	2017	Serie A	21	0	—		4 (Note: Appearance(s) in Copa Libertadores)	0	—		25	0
Barcelona SC	2018	Serie A	19	1	—		1 (Note: Appearance(s) in Copa Sudamericana)	0	—		20	1
Barcelona SC	2019	Serie A	15	0	3	0	2	0	—		6	0
Barcelona SC	Total		55	1	3	0	7	0	0	0	62	1
Independiente del Valle	2020	Serie A	22	1	—		7	1	2 (Note: Appearance(s) in Recopa Sudamericana)	0	31	2
Independiente del Valle	2021	Serie A	4	0	—		5	0	—		9	0
Independiente del Valle	2022	Serie A	7	0	6	0	4 (Note: One appearance in Copa Libertadores; three appearances in Copa Sudamericana)	0	—		17	0
Independiente del Valle	2023	Serie A	15	1	—		3	0	4 (Note: Two appearances in Recopa Sudamericana; one appearance in UEFA–CONMEBOL Club Challenge; one appearance in Supercopa Ecuador)	0	22	1
Independiente del Valle	2024	Serie A	14	0	—		6 (Note: Four appearances in Copa Libertadores; two appearances in Copa Sudamericana)	0	—		22	1
Independiente del Valle	Total		62	2	6	0	25	1	6	0	99	3
Career total			269	15	9	0	32	1	35	7	345	23

=== International ===
As of 18 October 2023

Appearances and goals by national team and year
National team	Year	Apps	Goals
Ecuador	2018	2	0
Ecuador	2019	5	0
Ecuador	2020	2	1
Ecuador	2023	1	0
Total		10	1

List of international goals scored by Beder Caicedo
No.	Date	Venue	Opponent	Score	Result	Competition
1	12 November 2020	Estadio Hernando Siles, La Paz, Bolivia	Bolivia	1–1	3–2	2022 FIFA World Cup qualification
