= Estadio Folke Anderson =

Coordinates: 00°57′40.62″N 79°39′21.16″W

Estadio Folke Anderson is a multi-use stadium in Esmeraldas, Ecuador. It is currently used mostly for football matches and is the home stadium of Esmeraldas Sporting Club, Club Deportivo Esmeraldas Petrolero, Centro Deportivo Juvenil, Club Atlético Juventus, Club Deportivo 5 de Agosto, Club Social y Deportivo Huracán Sporting Club, Club Deportivo Vargas Torres, Club Tácito Ortiz Urriola, Rocafuerte Sporting Club and Club Deportivo Sagrado Corazón. The stadium was given to Ecuador by Swedish entrepreneur Folke Andersson, who gave it during the 1958 FIFA World Cup. It holds 14,000 people.
