= Mateo Carabajal =

Argentine professional footballer

Personal information
- Full name: Mateo Carabajal
- Date of birth: 21 February 1997 (age 29)
- Place of birth: Pehuajó, Argentina
- Height: 1.84 m (6 ft 0 in)
- Position: Centre-back

Team information
- Current team: Independiente del Valle
- Number: 14

Youth career
- Estudiantes Unidos
- 2014–2018: Arsenal de Sarandí

Senior career*
Years	Team	Apps	(Gls)
2018–2021	Arsenal de Sarandí	41	(3)
2021–	Independiente del Valle	103	(0)
- * Club domestic league appearances and goals as of 19 August 2025

Mateo Carabajal (born 21 February 1997) is an Argentine professional footballer who plays as a centre-back for Independiente del Valle.

== Career ==
Carabajal started his senior career with Arsenal de Sarandí, who signed him from Estudiantes Unidos in 2014. Sergio Rondina promoted him into their squad during the 2017–18 Argentine Primera División campaign, selecting Carabajal for his professional bow on 14 April 2018 against Belgrano. He featured in a league match with Defensa y Justicia a month later, as Arsenal were relegated to Primera B Nacional.

On 30 July 2021, Carabajal joined Ecuadorian club Independiente del Valle.

== Career statistics ==
As of 18 November 2018.

Club statistics
Club	Season	League			Cup (Note: Includes the Copa Argentina)		League Cup		Continental		Other		Total	
Club	Season	Division	Apps	Goals	Apps	Goals	Apps	Goals	Apps	Goals	Apps	Goals	Apps	Goals
Arsenal de Sarandí	2017–18	Primera División	2	0	0	0	—		—		0	0	2	0
Arsenal de Sarandí	2018–19	Primera B Nacional	5	0	0	0	—		—		0	0	5	0
Career total			7	0	0	0	—		—		0	0	7	0
