= Richard Schunke =

Argentine footballer

Personal information
- Full name: Richard Hernán Schunke
- Date of birth: 26 November 1991 (age 34)
- Place of birth: Posadas, Argentina
- Height: 1.85 m (6 ft 1 in)
- Position: Centre-back

Team information
- Current team: Independiente del Valle
- Number: 5

Youth career
- Almagro

Senior career*
Years	Team	Apps	(Gls)
2011–2016	Almagro	145	(8)
2017	Deportivo Cuenca	43	(2)
2018–	Independiente del Valle	189	(6)
- * Club domestic league appearances and goals as of 19 August 2025

Richard Hernán Schunke (born 26 November 1991) is an Argentine professional footballer who plays as a centre-back for Independiente del Valle.

== Career ==
As a youth player, Schunke played as a goalkeeper, midfielder, and forward, before becoming a defender.

Schunke started his career with Argentine third division side Almagro, where he made 145 league appearances and scored 8 goals.

Before the 2018 season, he signed for Ecuadorian top flight side Independiente del Valle, helping them win the 2019 Copa Sudamericana.
