= Independiente del Valle =

Association football club in Ecuador

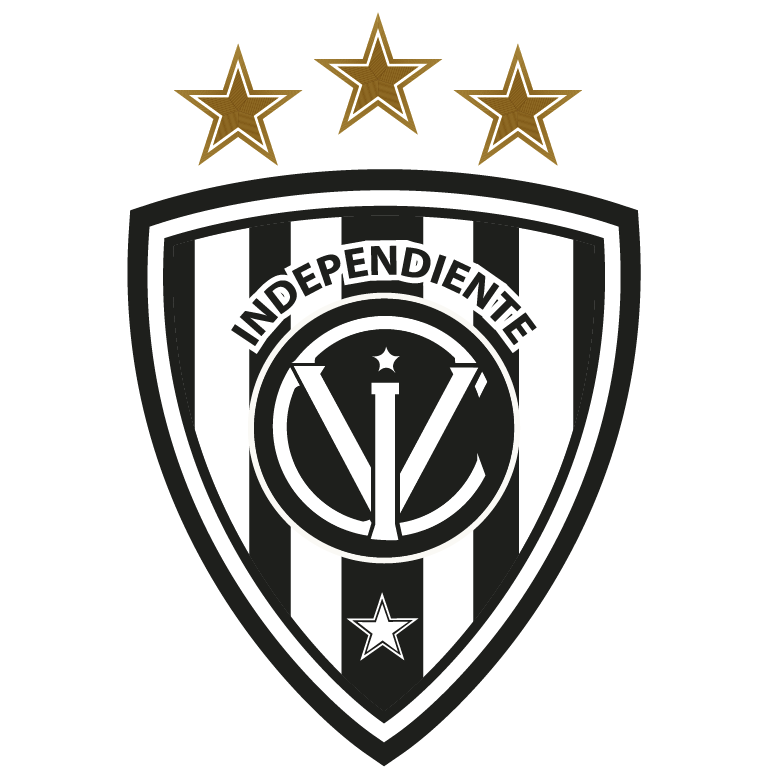
- Full name: Club de Alto Rendimiento Especializado Independiente del Valle
- Nicknames: Los Negriazules (The Black-and-Blues); El Matagigantes (The Giant-Killer); Los Rayados del Valle (The Striped Ones from the Valley)
- Short name: IDV
- Founded: 1 March 1958; 68 years ago
- Ground: Estadio Banco Guayaquil; Quito, Ecuador
- Capacity: 12,000
- Chairman: Franklin Tello Núñez
- Manager: Joaquín Papa
- League: Ecuadorian Serie A
- 2025: First stage: 1st of 16; First hexagonal: 1st of 6
- Website: www.independientedelvalle.com
Home colours	Away colours	Third colours

Club de Alto Rendimiento Especializado Independiente del Valle, known simply as Independiente del Valle, is a professional football club based in Sangolquí, Ecuador that currently plays in the Ecuadorian Serie A.

Founded in 1958, the club plays its home games at Estadio Banco Guayaquil, which opened in March 2021 and has a capacity of 12,000. In the 2013 Serie A season Independiente finished runners-up and they won their first league title in 2021. After being runners up twice consecutively in 2023 and 2024 to LDU Quito, they captured their second-ever league title in 2025, coming first in the first hexagonal.

In CONMEBOL competitions they reached the final of the 2016 Copa Libertadores after famously defeating powerhouses River Plate and Boca Juniors. They won their first Copa Sudamericana title in 2019, and three years later the club would become one of the few two-time Sudamericana champions after defeating São Paulo in the 2022 final. A year later in 2023, they beat 2022 Copa Libertadores champions Flamengo in the Recopa Sudamericana, historically at the Maracana, winning 5-4 on penalties, an achievement rare to countries outside Brazil and Argentina.

Independiente have a renowned youth academy. Notable players they have produced include Junior Sornoza, Cristian Ramírez, Gonzalo Plata, Moisés Caicedo, Piero Hincapié, Willian Pacho and Kendry Páez.

== History ==
The club was founded on 1 March 1958 as Club Deportivo Independiente by Jose Terán, a football fan from Sangolquí, along with a group of friends including José Díaz, Jorge Atapuma, the Negro Sanguano, Tomás Zaldumbide and Marino Guayasamín. In 1977, two years after the death of José Terán, the club's name was changed to Club Social y Deportivo Independiente José Terán in honor of its founder. The name and initial club colors (red and white) were inspired by Argentine club Club Atlético Independiente.

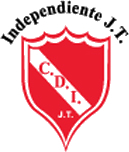
Old logo used until 2007.

In 1995 the club reached the Segunda Categoría (3rd Division) for the second time. After winning the Segunda Categoría in 2007, the club changed its name to Independiente del Valle and adopted the current colors (blue and black). Los Negriazules achieved promotion to the Serie A for the first time ever in the 2010 season, after winning the 2009 Serie B.

In the 2013 Serie A, the club finished runners-up on the aggregate table. Independiente del Valle made its first international participation that same year, in the 2013 Copa Sudamericana, where it was eliminated in the second stage by Universidad de Chile after having beat Venezuelan club Deportivo Anzoategui in the first stage. The next year, the Ecuadorian club made its first Copa Libertadores participation and second overall international participation, with the 2014 edition. In that edition, the club was eliminated after placing 3rd in their group.

In July 2014, the club officially changed its name from "Independiente del Valle" to Club de Alto Rendimiento Especializado Independiente del Valle. Although the club had changed its name already, it had never been made official by the Ecuadorian Football Federation until that point.

Independiente del Valle unexpectedly reached the finals of the 2016 Copa Libertadores with incredible odds, being compared to Leicester City's Premier League title that same year. Independiente began its knockout stage run by beating Copa Libertadores defending champions, Argentina's River Plate, in the round of 16 2–1 on aggregate. In the quarter-finals they defeated Pumas UNAM on penalties 5–3, after an aggregate score of 3–3. The club subsequently faced Argentina's giant Boca Juniors in the semi-final, defeating them 5–3 on aggregate, including a 3–2 victory at the famous La Bombonera stadium. These feats earned the team the nickname "matagigantes" (killer of giants). In the finals, the Ecuadorians faced Colombia's Atlético Nacional. In the first leg played at Estadio Olímpico Atahualpa on 20 July, the match finished 1–1. Independiente's fairy tale story came to a conclusion after a 1–0 loss in the second leg with the series ending 2–1 in favor of the Colombians.

In November 2019, Independiente del Valle played their first Copa Sudamericana final, and only its second ever CONMEBOL final, where they defeated Club Atlético Colón 3–1 in Asunción. This was the Ecuadorian club's first historic title. It was considered a major upset because Colón had a richer history and a much bigger fanbase, with around 40,000 fans at the stadium versus only 500 Ecuadorians.

In February 2020, the club lost the 2020 Recopa Sudamericana against the champion of the 2019 Copa Libertadores, Flamengo. The first leg in Quito was a 2–2 draw, but in the second leg at Estadio Maracana, Flamengo won 3–0 and became the champion with a 5–2 aggregate score.

== Performance in CONMEBOL competitions ==
- Copa Libertadores: 12 appearances
  - 2014: Group Stage
  - 2015: First Stage
  - 2016: Runners-up
  - 2017: Second Qualifying stage
  - 2018: Second Qualifying stage
  - 2020: Round of 16
  - 2021: Group Stage
  - 2022: Group Stage
  - 2023: Round of 16
  - 2024: Group Stage
  - 2025: Group Stage
  - 2026: Quarter-finals
- Copa Sudamericana: 7 appearances
  - 2013: Second Stage
  - 2014: Second Stage
  - 2019: Champions
  - 2021: Round of 16
  - 2022: Champions
  - 2024: Knockout round play-offs
  - 2025: Semi-finals
- Recopa Sudamericana: 2 appearances
  - 2020: Runners-up
  - 2023: Champions

== Stadium ==
Estadio Rumiñahui was inaugurated in 1941 and has a capacity for 8,000 spectators.

For international tournaments the club use larger stadiums like the Estadio Olímpico Atahualpa in Quito that has a 38,500-capacity.

In March 2021, the club opened a new 12,000-capacity stadium called Estadio Banco Guayaquil. It meets modern FIFA standards and is able to hold international matches, unlike their old stadium. It also has three grandstands with a roof, compared to Estadio Rumiñahui, which only had one grandstand.

== Reserve team ==
Since 2018, the club has a reserve team in the Ecuadorian Serie B, formerly named Alianza Cotopaxi SC. After the promotion, the club changed name to C.D. Independiente Juniors.

== Players ==
=== First-team squad ===
As of 1 September 2026

Note: Flags indicate national team as defined under FIFA eligibility rules; some limited exceptions apply. Players may hold more than one non-FIFA nationality.

No.	Pos.	Nation	Player
1	GK	COL	Aldair Quintana
2	DF	PAR	Luis Zárate
4	DF	ECU	Jhon Espinoza
5	DF	ARG	Richard Schunke (captain)
6	MF	ECU	Jordy Alcívar
7	MF	ECU	Patrik Mercado
8	MF	ECU	Youri Ochoa
9	FW	PAR	Charly González
10	MF	ECU	Junior Sornoza
11	FW	ARG	Matías Perelló
13	DF	ECU	Daykol Romero
14	DF	ARG	Mateo Carabajal
15	DF	ECU	Gustavo Cortez
16	MF	ECU	Ronald Briones

No.	Pos.	Nation	Player
17	FW	ECU	Aron Rodríguez
18	FW	ECU	Steven Góngora
19	DF	ECU	Layan Loor
21	MF	ECU	Jean Arroyo
22	GK	ARG	Guido Villar
23	DF	URU	Juan Viacava
26	MF	ECU	Juan Cazares
31	FW	ECU	Emerson Pata
32	MF	ECU	Jhegson Méndez
33	DF	ECU	Andy Velasco
51	DF	ECU	Deinner Ordóñez
52	FW	ECU	Yandri Vásquez
70	GK	ECU	Miguel Peralta
99	FW	ECU	Djorkaeff Reasco

=== World Cup players ===
The following players were chosen to represent their country at the FIFA World Cup while contracted to Independiente del Valle.

- (Ecuador) Moisés Ramírez (2022)
- (Ecuador) Jordy Alcívar (2026)

=== Players out on loan ===
Note: Flags indicate national team as defined under FIFA eligibility rules; some limited exceptions apply. Players may hold more than one non-FIFA nationality.

No.	Pos.	Nation	Player
12	GK	ECU	Eduardo Bores (at Emelec)
—	MF	ECU	José Klinger (at Macará)

No.	Pos.	Nation	Player
—	MF	ECU	Jostin Bravo (at Libertad)

== Managers ==
=== Current technical staff ===
- (Uruguay) Joaquín Papa (head coach)
- (Uruguay) Ignacio Risso (assistant coach)
- (Ecuador) Jairo Campos (2nd assistant coach)
- (Uruguay) Alberto Sciegata (fitness coach)
- (Argentina) Gustavo Flores (goalkeeper coach)
- (Uruguay) Juan Miguel Giuffra Facio (performance analyst)
- (Ecuador) Carlos Navarrete (doctor)
- (Ecuador) Paolo Toala (physiotherapist)
- (Ecuador) Mario Alcocer (equipment manager)
- (Ecuador) Edison Peñaherrera (equipment assistant)

=== List of managers ===
- (Ecuador) Nelson Brito (2007 – April 26, 2008)
- (Colombia) Daniel Silguero (April 30, 2008 – November 8, 2008)
- (Brazil) Janio Pinto (November 8, 2008 – April 27, 2009)
- (Argentina) Guillermo Duró (May 11, 2010 – Sept 21, 2010)
- (Argentina) Julio Asad (Sept 22, 2010 – April 17, 2011)
- (Ecuador) Carlos Sevilla (April 17, 2011 – Sept 20, 2012)
- (Ecuador) Álvaro Carcelén (Sept 21, 2012 – Sept 30, 2012)
- (Uruguay) Pablo Repetto (Sept 25, 2012 – Jul 27, 2016)
- (Colombia) Alexis Mendoza (Jul 29, 2016 – Dec 6, 2017)
- (Argentina) Gabriel Schürrer (Dec 10, 2017 – 2018)
- (Spain) Ismael Rescalvo (Jun 28, 2018 – April 27, 2019)
- (Ecuador) Yuri Solano (April 27, 2019 – May 7, 2019)
- (Spain) Miguel Ángel Ramírez (May 7, 2019 – Dec 19, 2020)
- (Portugal) Renato Paiva (Dec 25, 2020 – May 30, 2022)
- (Argentina) Martín Anselmi (June 1, 2022 – Dec 31, 2023)
- (Argentina) Javier Gandolfi (Jan 1, 2024 – Dec 23, 2024)
- (Spain) Javier Rabanal (Dec 24, 2024 –Dec 31, 2025)
- (Uruguay) Joaquín Papa (Jan 1 , 2026 –Presente)

== Honours ==
=== National ===
- Serie A
  - Winners (3): 2021, 2025, 2026
- Copa Ecuador
  - Winners (1): 2022
- Supercopa Ecuador
  - Winners (2): 2023, 2026
- Serie B
  - Winners (1): 2009
- Segunda Categoría
  - Winners (1): 2007

=== International ===
- Copa Libertadores
  - Runners-up (1): 2016
- Copa Sudamericana
  - Winners (2): 2019, 2022
- Recopa Sudamericana
  - Winners (1): 2023
  - Runners-up (1): 2020

=== Regional ===
- Copa Pichincha
  - Winners (2): 1978, 1995
- Segunda Categoría de Pichincha
  - Winners (2): 1997, 2007

=== Under-20 team ===
- U-20 Copa Libertadores
  - Winners (1): 2020
  - Runners-up (3): 2018, 2022, 2023
