= 2022 Copa Libertadores group stage =

The 2022 Copa Libertadores group stage was played from 5 April to 26 May 2022. A total of 32 teams competed in the group stage to decide the 16 places in the final stages of the 2022 Copa Libertadores.

== Draw ==
The draw for the group stage was held on 25 March 2022, 12:00 PYST (UTC−3), at the CONMEBOL Convention Centre in Luque, Paraguay.

Teams were seeded by their CONMEBOL Clubs ranking as of 16 December 2021 (shown in parentheses), taking into account the following three factors:

1. Performance in the last 10 years, taking into account Copa Libertadores and Copa Sudamericana results in the period 2012–2021.
2. Historical coefficient, taking into account Copa Libertadores and Copa Sudamericana results in the period 1960–2011 and 2002–2011 respectively.
3. Local tournament champion, with bonus points awarded to domestic league champions of the last 10 years.

For the group stage, the 32 teams were drawn into eight groups (Groups A–H) of four containing a team from each of the four pots. The defending champions Palmeiras were directly assigned as the top seed of Group A (position A1). The remaining teams were distributed into four pots according to their CONMEBOL Clubs ranking. Teams from the same association could not be drawn into the same group, excluding the four winners of the third stage, which were allocated to Pot 4 and could be drawn into the same group with another team from the same association.

Group stage draw
Pot 1	Pot 2	Pot 3	Pot 4
(Brazil) Palmeiras (2); (Argentina) River Plate (1); (Argentina) Boca Juniors (3); (Brazil) Flamengo (4); (Uruguay) Nacional (6); (Uruguay) Peñarol (7); (Brazil) Atlético Mineiro (11); (Brazil) Athletico Paranaense (12)	(Paraguay) Cerro Porteño (15); (Paraguay) Libertad (16); (Ecuador) Independiente del Valle (21); (Chile) Universidad Católica (26); (Ecuador) Emelec (28); (Brazil) Corinthians (29); (Chile) Colo-Colo (32); (Argentina) Vélez Sarsfield (33)	(Peru) Sporting Cristal (35); (Colombia) Deportivo Cali (44); (Brazil) Red Bull Bragantino (45); (Venezuela) Deportivo Táchira (46); (Peru) Alianza Lima (54); (Colombia) Deportes Tolima (60); (Argentina) Colón (64); (Venezuela) Caracas (67)	(Bolivia) Always Ready (86); (Argentina) Talleres (105); (Bolivia) Independiente Petrolero (178); (Brazil) Fortaleza (229); (Paraguay) Olimpia (14); (Argentina) Estudiantes (34); (Bolivia) The Strongest (40); (Brazil) América Mineiro (No rank)

Notes

1. ^{TH} The defending Copa Libertadores champions, Palmeiras, were automatically allocated to Group A and the position A1.
2. ^{CS} The defending Copa Sudamericana champions (normally seeded in Pot 2) were seeded in Pot 1 due to their CONMEBOL Clubs rank.
3. ^{Q3} The third stage winners were seeded in Pot 4.

The following are the four winners of the third stage of qualifying which joined the 28 direct entrants in the group stage.

Match	Third stage winners
G1	(Paraguay) Olimpia
G2	(Argentina) Estudiantes
G3	(Bolivia) The Strongest
G4	(Brazil) América Mineiro

== Format ==
In the group stage, each group is played on a home-and-away round-robin basis. The teams are ranked according to the following criteria: 1. Points (3 points for a win, 1 point for a draw, and 0 points for a loss); 2. Goal difference; 3. Goals scored; 4. Away goals scored; 5. CONMEBOL ranking (Regulations Article 2.4.2).

The winners and runners-up of each group advanced to the round of 16 of the final stages. The third-placed teams of each group entered the round of 16 of the 2022 Copa Sudamericana.

== Schedule ==
The schedule of each matchday was as follows (Regulations Article 2.2.2):

Matchday	Dates	Matches
Matchday 1	5–7 April 2022	Team 4 vs. Team 2, Team 3 vs. Team 1
Matchday 2	12–14 April 2022	Team 2 vs. Team 3, Team 1 vs. Team 4
Matchday 3	26–28 April 2022	Team 2 vs. Team 1, Team 4 vs. Team 3
Matchday 4	3–5 May 2022	Team 3 vs. Team 2, Team 4 vs. Team 1
Matchday 5	17–19 May 2022	Team 1 vs. Team 2, Team 3 vs. Team 4
Matchday 6	24–26 May 2022	Team 1 vs. Team 3, Team 2 vs. Team 4

== Groups ==
=== Group A ===
Pos	Team	Pld	W	D	L	GF	GA	GD	Pts	Qualification	PAL	EME	TAC	CIP
1	(Brazil) Palmeiras	6	6	0	0	25	3	+22	18	Round of 16	—	1–0	4–1	8–1
2	(Ecuador) Emelec	6	2	2	2	14	7	+7	8	Round of 16	1–3	—	1–1	7–0
3	(Venezuela) Deportivo Táchira	6	2	1	3	8	14	−6	7	Copa Sudamericana	0–4	1–4	—	3–0
4	(Bolivia) Independiente Petrolero	6	0	1	5	3	26	−23	1		0–5	1–1	1–2	—

Source: CONMEBOL
6 April 2022
20:00 UTC−4

Deportivo Táchira (Venezuela)	0–4	(Brazil) Palmeiras
	Report	Dudu 8'; Veiga 35'; Navarro 48', 53'

Estadio Polideportivo de Pueblo Nuevo, San Cristóbal
Referee: Darío Herrera (Argentina)
6 April 2022
22:00 UTC−4

Independiente Petrolero (Bolivia)	1–1	(Ecuador) Emelec
Cristaldo 88'	Report	Quiroga 90+1'

Estadio Olímpico Patria, Sucre
Referee: Cristian Garay (Chile)

12 April 2022
21:30 UTC−3

Palmeiras (Brazil)	8–1	(Bolivia) Independiente Petrolero
Zé Rafael 41'; Navarro 47', 54', 56', 78'; Rony 80'; Veiga 86', 90'	Report	Correa 6'

Allianz Parque, São Paulo
Attendance: 26,409
Referee: Derlis López (Paraguay)
14 April 2022
21:00 UTC−5

Emelec (Ecuador)	1–1	(Venezuela) Deportivo Táchira
Rojas 11'	Report	Chacón 4'

Estadio George Capwell, Guayaquil
Attendance: 19,634
Referee: Jhon Hinestroza (Colombia)

26 April 2022
18:15 UTC−4

Independiente Petrolero (Bolivia)	1–2	(Venezuela) Deportivo Táchira
Campos 45'	Report	Uribe 44'; Simisterra 65'

Estadio Olímpico Patria, Sucre
Referee: Nicolás Gamboa (Chile)
27 April 2022
19:00 UTC−5

Emelec (Ecuador)	1–3	(Brazil) Palmeiras
Rojas 62'	Report	Rony 19'; Veron 25'; Breno Lopes 90+2'

Estadio George Capwell, Guayaquil
Referee: Patricio Loustau (Argentina)

3 May 2022
18:15 UTC−4

Deportivo Táchira (Venezuela)	1–4	(Ecuador) Emelec
Uribe 37'	Report	Rodríguez 3', 11', 59' (pen.); Cabeza 74'

Estadio Polideportivo de Pueblo Nuevo, San Cristóbal
Referee: Pablo Echavarría (Argentina)
3 May 2022
20:30 UTC−4

Independiente Petrolero (Bolivia)	0–5	(Brazil) Palmeiras
	Report	Veiga 17' (pen.), 22', 60'; Navarro 62'; Murilo 74'

Estadio Olímpico Patria, Sucre
Referee: Nicolás Lamolina (Argentina)

18 May 2022
19:00 UTC−3

Palmeiras (Brazil)	1–0	(Ecuador) Emelec
Danilo 74'	Report

Allianz Parque, São Paulo
Referee: Nicolás Gamboa (Chile) (Note: Referee Julio Bascuñán from Chile, who was originally assigned to the Palmeiras v Emelec match, was replaced by Nicolás Gamboa from Chile.)
18 May 2022
20:00 UTC−4

Deportivo Táchira (Venezuela)	3–0	(Bolivia) Independiente Petrolero
Hernández 22', 28'; Simisterra 90+2'	Report

Estadio Polideportivo de Pueblo Nuevo, San Cristóbal
Referee: Carlos Benítez (Paraguay)

24 May 2022
21:30 UTC−3

Palmeiras (Brazil)	4–1	(Venezuela) Deportivo Táchira
Scarpa 15', 22' (pen.), 68' (pen.); Rony 57'	Report	Gutiérrez 48'

Allianz Parque, São Paulo
Referee: Carlos Ortega (Colombia)
24 May 2022
19:30 UTC−5

Emelec (Ecuador)	7–0	(Bolivia) Independiente Petrolero
Cabeza 16', 35'; Rodríguez 38', 77'; Cevallos 45+1'; Rojas 54'; Quiroga 75'	Report

Estadio George Capwell, Guayaquil
Referee: Kevin Ortega (Peru)

=== Group B ===
Pos	Team	Pld	W	D	L	GF	GA	GD	Pts	Qualification	LIB	CAP	STR	CAR
1	(Paraguay) Libertad	6	3	1	2	8	6	+2	10	Round of 16	—	1–0	4–1	2–1
2	(Brazil) Athletico Paranaense	6	3	1	2	8	7	+1	10	Round of 16	2–0	—	1–0	5–1
3	(Bolivia) The Strongest	6	1	3	2	8	7	+1	6	Copa Sudamericana	1–1	5–0	—	1–1
4	(Venezuela) Caracas	6	1	3	2	4	8	−4	6		1–0	0–0	0–0	—

Source: CONMEBOL
5 April 2022
18:15 UTC−4

Caracas (Venezuela)	0–0	(Brazil) Athletico Paranaense
	Report

Estadio Olímpico de la UCV, Caracas
Attendance: 3,807
Referee: Andrés Rojas (Colombia)
7 April 2022
22:00 UTC−4

The Strongest (Bolivia)	1–1	(Paraguay) Libertad
Triverio 11'	Report	Merlini 14'

Estadio Hernando Siles, La Paz
Attendance: 6,079
Referee: Nicolás Gamboa (Chile)

13 April 2022
18:00 UTC−4

Libertad (Paraguay)	2–1	(Venezuela) Caracas
Cardozo 3'; Melgarejo 34'	Report	Bonsu Osei 20'

Estadio Defensores del Chaco, Asunción (Note: Libertad played their home matches at Estadio Defensores del Chaco, Asunción instead of their regular stadium Estadio La Huerta, Asunción.)
Referee: Facundo Tello (Argentina)
14 April 2022
19:00 UTC−3

Athletico Paranaense (Brazil)	1–0	(Bolivia) The Strongest
Terans 65' (pen.)	Report

Arena da Baixada, Curitiba
Attendance: 21,144
Referee: Darío Herrera (Argentina)

26 April 2022
18:15 UTC−4

Libertad (Paraguay)	1–0	(Brazil) Athletico Paranaense
Riveros 57'	Report

Estadio Defensores del Chaco, Asunción
Referee: Gustavo Tejera (Uruguay)
27 April 2022
22:00 UTC−4

The Strongest (Bolivia)	1–1	(Venezuela) Caracas
Prost 34'	Report	Akinyoola 83'

Estadio Hernando Siles, La Paz
Attendance: 6,675
Referee: Guillermo Guerrero (Ecuador)

3 May 2022
18:15 UTC−4

Caracas (Venezuela)	1–0	(Paraguay) Libertad
Akinyoola 51'	Report

Estadio Olímpico de la UCV, Caracas
Referee: Andrés Matonte (Uruguay)
3 May 2022
18:15 UTC−4

The Strongest (Bolivia)	5–0	(Brazil) Athletico Paranaense
Triverio 32', 51'; Prost 70'; Cascini 90+1'; Erick 90+4' (o.g.)	Report

Estadio Hernando Siles, La Paz
Referee: Augusto Menéndez (Peru)

17 May 2022
18:15 UTC−4

Caracas (Venezuela)	0–0	(Bolivia) The Strongest
	Report

Estadio Olímpico de la UCV, Caracas
Referee: Darío Herrera (Argentina)
18 May 2022
19:00 UTC−3

Athletico Paranaense (Brazil)	2–0	(Paraguay) Libertad
Cuello 56'; Canobbio 69'	Report

Arena da Baixada, Curitiba
Referee: Patricio Loustau (Argentina)

26 May 2022
19:00 UTC−3

Athletico Paranaense (Brazil)	5–1	(Venezuela) Caracas
Pablo 19', 22'; Christian 45+1', 71'; Pedro Rocha 75'	Report	Rivero 58'

Arena da Baixada, Curitiba
Referee: Nicolás Lamolina (Argentina)
26 May 2022
18:00 UTC−4

Libertad (Paraguay)	4–1	(Bolivia) The Strongest
Melgarejo 25'; Mendieta 55' (pen.), 90'; Jusino 70' (o.g.)	Report	Ursino 41'

Estadio Defensores del Chaco, Asunción
Referee: Facundo Tello (Argentina)

=== Group C ===
Pos	Team	Pld	W	D	L	GF	GA	GD	Pts	Qualification	EST	VEL	NAC	RBB
1	(Argentina) Estudiantes	6	4	1	1	8	5	+3	13	Round of 16	—	4–1	1–0	2–0
2	(Argentina) Vélez Sarsfield	6	2	2	2	12	11	+1	8	Round of 16	4–0	—	1–2	2–2
3	(Uruguay) Nacional	6	2	1	3	7	7	0	7	Copa Sudamericana	0–0	2–3	—	3–0
4	(Brazil) Red Bull Bragantino	6	1	2	3	5	9	−4	5		0–1	1–1	2–0	—

Source: CONMEBOL
6 April 2022
19:00 UTC−3

Red Bull Bragantino (Brazil)	2–0	(Uruguay) Nacional
Ytalo 35'; Hurtado 90+3'	Report

Estádio Nabi Abi Chedid, Bragança Paulista
Referee: Kevin Ortega (Peru)
7 April 2022
21:00 UTC−3

Estudiantes (Argentina)	4–1	(Argentina) Vélez Sarsfield
Mas 6'; Rogel 42'; Del Prete 53'; Zapiola 88'	Report	Janson 35'

Estadio Jorge Luis Hirschi, La Plata
Attendance: 16,803
Referee: Eber Aquino (Paraguay)

13 April 2022
21:00 UTC−3

Nacional (Uruguay)	0–0	(Argentina) Estudiantes
	Report

Estadio Gran Parque Central, Montevideo
Attendance: 22,339
Referee: Wilmar Roldán (Colombia)
14 April 2022
21:00 UTC−3

Vélez Sarsfield (Argentina)	2–2	(Brazil) Red Bull Bragantino
De los Santos 8'; Natan 47' (o.g.)	Report	Ytalo 2', 62'

Estadio José Amalfitani, Buenos Aires
Attendance: 6,826
Referee: Jhon Ospina (Colombia)

26 April 2022
19:15 UTC−3

Vélez Sarsfield (Argentina)	1–2	(Uruguay) Nacional
Soñora 15'	Report	Gigliotti 31', 75'

Estadio José Amalfitani, Buenos Aires
Attendance: 6,856
Referee: Eber Aquino (Paraguay)
26 April 2022
19:15 UTC−3

Estudiantes (Argentina)	2–0	(Brazil) Red Bull Bragantino
Rogel 54'; Boselli 59'	Report

Estadio Jorge Luis Hirschi, La Plata
Attendance: 17,907
Referee: Kevin Ortega (Peru)

3 May 2022
21:30 UTC−3

Estudiantes (Argentina)	1–0	(Uruguay) Nacional
Castro 41'	Report

Estadio Jorge Luis Hirschi, La Plata
Attendance: 21,156
Referee: Wilmar Roldán (Colombia)
5 May 2022
21:00 UTC−3

Red Bull Bragantino (Brazil)	1–1	(Argentina) Vélez Sarsfield
Hurtado 84'	Report	Pratto 14'

Estádio Nabi Abi Chedid, Bragança Paulista
Referee: Jhon Ospina (Colombia)

17 May 2022
19:15 UTC−3

Red Bull Bragantino (Brazil)	0–1	(Argentina) Estudiantes
	Report	Del Prete 77'

Estádio Nabi Abi Chedid, Bragança Paulista
Attendance: 4,769
Referee: Juan Benítez (Paraguay)
18 May 2022
19:00 UTC−3

Nacional (Uruguay)	2–3	(Argentina) Vélez Sarsfield
Zabala 21'; Gigliotti 89' (pen.)	Report	Janson 45'; De los Santos 60'; Perrone 90+4'

Estadio Gran Parque Central, Montevideo
Attendance: 22,075
Referee: Piero Maza (Chile)

24 May 2022
19:15 UTC−3

Nacional (Uruguay)	3–0	(Brazil) Red Bull Bragantino
Trezza 9'; Cándido 31'; Cleiton 84' (o.g.)	Report

Estadio Gran Parque Central, Montevideo
Referee: Wilmar Roldán (Colombia)
24 May 2022
19:15 UTC−3

Vélez Sarsfield (Argentina)	4–0	(Argentina) Estudiantes
Janson 21', 43'; Pratto 73'; Osorio 83'	Report

Estadio José Amalfitani, Buenos Aires
Attendance: 40,000
Referee: Nicolás Gamboa (Chile)

=== Group D ===
Pos	Team	Pld	W	D	L	GF	GA	GD	Pts	Qualification	CAM	TOL	IDV	AMG
1	(Brazil) Atlético Mineiro	6	3	2	1	10	6	+4	11	Round of 16	—	1–2	3–1	1–1
2	(Colombia) Deportes Tolima	6	3	2	1	10	9	+1	11	Round of 16	0–2	—	1–0	2–2
3	(Ecuador) Independiente del Valle	6	2	2	2	9	7	+2	8	Copa Sudamericana	1–1	2–2	—	3–0
4	(Brazil) América Mineiro	6	0	2	4	6	13	−7	2		1–2	2–3	0–2	—

Source: CONMEBOL
6 April 2022
19:00 UTC−3

América Mineiro (Brazil)	0–2	(Ecuador) Independiente del Valle
	Report	Sornoza 12'; Arce 90+5'

Estádio Independência, Belo Horizonte
Referee: Fernando Rapallini (Argentina)
6 April 2022
19:00 UTC−5

Deportes Tolima (Colombia)	0–2	(Brazil) Atlético Mineiro
	Report	Fernández 45'; Tchê Tchê 80'

Estadio Manuel Murillo Toro, Ibagué
Referee: Alexis Herrera (Venezuela)

13 April 2022
21:00 UTC−3

Atlético Mineiro (Brazil)	1–1	(Brazil) América Mineiro
Ademir 85'	Report	Felipe Azevedo 51'

Mineirão, Belo Horizonte
Attendance: 37,312
Referee: Patricio Loustau (Argentina)
13 April 2022
21:00 UTC−5

Independiente del Valle (Ecuador)	2–2	(Colombia) Deportes Tolima
Sornoza 52', 89' (pen.)	Report	Lucumí 15'; Plata 41'

Estadio Banco Guayaquil, Quito
Attendance: 3,699
Referee: Kevin Ortega (Peru)

26 April 2022
19:30 UTC−5

Independiente del Valle (Ecuador)	1–1	(Brazil) Atlético Mineiro
Sornoza 50'	Report	Hulk 7'

Estadio Banco Guayaquil, Quito
Attendance: 6,980
Referee: Fernando Rapallini (Argentina)
27 April 2022
19:00 UTC−3

América Mineiro (Brazil)	2–3	(Colombia) Deportes Tolima
Pedrinho 53'; Hernández 77' (o.g.)	Report	Plata 66', 90+5'; Quiñónes 86'

Estádio Independência, Belo Horizonte
Attendance: 4,651
Referee: Andrés Cunha (Uruguay)

3 May 2022
21:30 UTC−3

América Mineiro (Brazil)	1–2	(Brazil) Atlético Mineiro
Conti 39'	Report	Arana 13'; Fernández 37'

Estádio Independência, Belo Horizonte
Attendance: 5,486
Referee: Darío Herrera (Argentina)
4 May 2022
21:00 UTC−5

Deportes Tolima (Colombia)	1–0	(Ecuador) Independiente del Valle
Ibargüen 88'	Report

Estadio Manuel Murillo Toro, Ibagué
Referee: Patricio Loustau (Argentina)

18 May 2022
19:00 UTC−5

Deportes Tolima (Colombia)	2–2	(Brazil) América Mineiro
Plata 40'; Rangel 43'	Report	Marlon 7'; Iago Maidana 27' (pen.)

Estadio Manuel Murillo Toro, Ibagué
Referee: Fernando Rapallini (Argentina)
19 May 2022
19:00 UTC−3

Atlético Mineiro (Brazil)	3–1	(Ecuador) Independiente del Valle
Hulk 9', 56'; Sávio 90+6'	Report	Vargas 82'

Mineirão, Belo Horizonte
Referee: Esteban Ostojich (Uruguay)

25 May 2022
21:00 UTC−3

Atlético Mineiro (Brazil)	1–2	(Colombia) Deportes Tolima
Eduardo Sasha 88'	Report	Rangel 55'; Lucumí 90+2'

Mineirão, Belo Horizonte
Attendance: 34,339
Referee: Patricio Loustau (Argentina)
25 May 2022
19:00 UTC−5

Independiente del Valle (Ecuador)	3–0	(Brazil) América Mineiro
Sornoza 17'; Gaibor 43'; Chávez 74'	Report

Estadio Banco Guayaquil, Quito
Referee: Leodán González (Uruguay)

=== Group E ===
Pos	Team	Pld	W	D	L	GF	GA	GD	Pts	Qualification	BOC	COR	CAL	CAR
1	(Argentina) Boca Juniors	6	3	1	2	5	5	0	10	Round of 16	—	1–1	1–0	2–0
2	(Brazil) Corinthians	6	2	3	1	5	4	+1	9	Round of 16	2–0	—	1–0	1–1
3	(Colombia) Deportivo Cali	6	2	2	2	7	4	+3	8	Copa Sudamericana	2–0	0–0	—	3–0
4	(Bolivia) Always Ready	6	1	2	3	5	9	−4	5		0–1	2–0	2–2	—

Source: CONMEBOL
5 April 2022
20:30 UTC−4

Always Ready (Bolivia)	2–0	(Brazil) Corinthians
Riquelme 8' (pen.); Ramallo 46'	Report

Estadio Hernando Siles, La Paz (Note: Always Ready played their home matches at Estadio Hernando Siles, La Paz instead of their regular stadium Estadio Municipal de Villa Ingenio, El Alto which did not meet CONMEBOL requirements.)
Attendance: 4,536
Referee: Piero Maza (Chile)
5 April 2022
19:30 UTC−5

Deportivo Cali (Colombia)	2–0	(Argentina) Boca Juniors
Burdisso 70'; Vásquez 80'	Report

Estadio Deportivo Cali, Palmira
Attendance: 18,695
Referee: Jesús Valenzuela (Venezuela)

12 April 2022
19:15 UTC−3

Boca Juniors (Argentina)	2–0	(Bolivia) Always Ready
Benedetto 25', 90+6'	Report

Estadio Alberto J. Armando, Buenos Aires
Referee: Gustavo Tejera (Uruguay)
13 April 2022
21:00 UTC−3

Corinthians (Brazil)	1–0	(Colombia) Deportivo Cali
Caldera 68' (o.g.)	Report

Neo Química Arena, São Paulo
Attendance: 37,837
Referee: Eber Aquino (Paraguay)

26 April 2022
21:30 UTC−3

Corinthians (Brazil)	2–0	(Argentina) Boca Juniors
Maycon 5', 78'	Report

Neo Química Arena, São Paulo
Attendance: 44,449
Referee: Andrés Matonte (Uruguay)
28 April 2022
22:00 UTC−4

Always Ready (Bolivia)	2–2	(Colombia) Deportivo Cali
Riquelme 35' (pen.); Arce 42'	Report	Velasco 45+5' (pen.); Burdisso 54'

Estadio Hernando Siles, La Paz
Referee: Augusto Aragón (Ecuador)

4 May 2022
19:00 UTC−5

Deportivo Cali (Colombia)	0–0	(Brazil) Corinthians
	Report

Estadio Deportivo Cali, Palmira
Referee: Andrés Cunha (Uruguay)
4 May 2022
20:00 UTC−4

Always Ready (Bolivia)	0–1	(Argentina) Boca Juniors
	Report	Salvio 37' (pen.)

Estadio Hernando Siles, La Paz
Referee: Kevin Ortega (Peru)

17 May 2022
21:30 UTC−3

Boca Juniors (Argentina)	1–1	(Brazil) Corinthians
Benedetto 42'	Report	Du Queiroz 16'

Estadio Alberto J. Armando, Buenos Aires
Attendance: 46,238
Referee: Christian Ferreyra (Uruguay)
19 May 2022
21:00 UTC−5

Deportivo Cali (Colombia)	3–0	(Bolivia) Always Ready
Vásquez 12', 55'; Mosquera 74'	Report

Estadio Deportivo Cali, Palmira
Attendance: 9,522
Referee: Alexis Herrera (Venezuela)

26 May 2022
21:00 UTC−3

Boca Juniors (Argentina)	1–0	(Colombia) Deportivo Cali
Varela 54'	Report

Estadio Alberto J. Armando, Buenos Aires
Referee: Piero Maza (Chile)
26 May 2022
21:00 UTC−3

Corinthians (Brazil)	1–1	(Bolivia) Always Ready
Adson 19'	Report	Borja 44'

Neo Química Arena, São Paulo
Referee: José Argote (Venezuela)

=== Group F ===
Pos	Team	Pld	W	D	L	GF	GA	GD	Pts	Qualification	RIV	FOR	CCL	ALI
1	(Argentina) River Plate	6	5	1	0	18	3	+15	16	Round of 16	—	2–0	4–0	8–1
2	(Brazil) Fortaleza	6	3	1	2	10	9	+1	10	Round of 16	1–1	—	1–2	2–1
3	(Chile) Colo-Colo	6	2	1	3	9	13	−4	7	Copa Sudamericana	1–2	3–4	—	2–1
4	(Peru) Alianza Lima	6	0	1	5	4	16	−12	1		0–1	0–2	1–1	—

Source: CONMEBOL
6 April 2022
19:00 UTC−5

Alianza Lima (Peru)	0–1	(Argentina) River Plate
	Report	Suárez 65'

Estadio Nacional, Lima (Note: Alianza Lima played their home match against River Plate at Estadio Nacional, Lima instead of their regular stadium Estadio Alejandro Villanueva, Lima.)
Referee: Wilmar Roldán (Colombia)
7 April 2022
19:00 UTC−3

Fortaleza (Brazil)	1–2	(Chile) Colo-Colo
Kayzer 70'	Report	Lucero 38'; Solari 49'

Castelão, Fortaleza
Attendance: 50,429
Referee: Andrés Cunha (Uruguay)

13 April 2022
18:00 UTC−4

Colo-Colo (Chile)	2–1	(Peru) Alianza Lima
Lucero 27'; Pavez 56'	Report	Benítez 69'

Estadio Monumental David Arellano, Santiago
Attendance: 31,601
Referee: Esteban Ostojich (Uruguay)
13 April 2022
21:00 UTC−3 (Note: The River Plate v Fortaleza match, originally scheduled for 13 April 2022, 19:00 local time, was re-scheduled to 21:00 local time.)

River Plate (Argentina)	2–0	(Brazil) Fortaleza
Fernández 10'; De la Cruz 33'	Report

Estadio Monumental Antonio Vespucio Liberti, Buenos Aires
Referee: Andrés Matonte (Uruguay)

27 April 2022
19:00 UTC−3 (Note: The Fortaleza v Alianza Lima match, originally scheduled for 27 April 2022, 21:00 local time, was re-scheduled to 19:00 local time.)

Fortaleza (Brazil)	2–1	(Peru) Alianza Lima
Romero 50'; Hércules 79'	Report	Lavandeira 70'

Castelão, Fortaleza
Attendance: 32,557
Referee: Carlos Betancur (Colombia)
27 April 2022
20:00 UTC−4

Colo-Colo (Chile)	1–2	(Argentina) River Plate
Lucero 90+2'	Report	Suárez 82'; Barco 89'

Estadio Monumental David Arellano, Santiago
Attendance: 35,065
Referee: Alexis Herrera (Venezuela)

5 May 2022
19:00 UTC−3

Fortaleza (Brazil)	1–1	(Argentina) River Plate
Romero 4'	Report	Fernández 17' (pen.)

Castelão, Fortaleza
Attendance: 48,867
Referee: Esteban Ostojich (Uruguay)
5 May 2022
21:00 UTC−5

Alianza Lima (Peru)	1–1	(Chile) Colo-Colo
Aguirre 46'	Report	Lucero 22'

Estadio Nacional, Lima (Note: Alianza Lima played their home matches against Colo-Colo and Fortaleza at Estadio Nacional, Lima instead of the originally scheduled Estadio Alejandro Villanueva, Lima.)
Referee: Nicolás Gallo (Colombia) (Note: Referee Carlos Betancur from Colombia, who was originally assigned to the Alianza Lima v Colo-Colo match, was replaced by Nicolás Gallo from Colombia.)

18 May 2022
21:00 UTC−5

Alianza Lima (Peru)	0–2	(Brazil) Fortaleza
	Report	Moisés 16'; Yago Pikachu 80'

Estadio Nacional, Lima
Referee: Franklin Congo (Ecuador)
19 May 2022
21:00 UTC−3

River Plate (Argentina)	4–0	(Chile) Colo-Colo
Palavecino 42'; De la Cruz 52'; Martínez 66'; Barco 68'	Report

Estadio Monumental Antonio Vespucio Liberti, Buenos Aires
Attendance: 53,577
Referee: Andrés Matonte (Uruguay)

25 May 2022
19:00 UTC−3

River Plate (Argentina)	8–1	(Peru) Alianza Lima
Álvarez 15', 18', 41', 54', 57', 83'; Simón 53'; Gómez 79'	Report	Lavandeira 89' (pen.)

Estadio Monumental Antonio Vespucio Liberti, Buenos Aires
Referee: Jhon Ospina (Colombia)
25 May 2022
18:00 UTC−4

Colo-Colo (Chile)	3–4	(Brazil) Fortaleza
Ceballos 45', 64' (o.g.); Gil 80'	Report	Romero 3'; Moisés 25', 54'; Yago Pikachu 61'

Estadio Monumental David Arellano, Santiago
Attendance: 0 (Note: The Colo-Colo v Fortaleza match was played behind closed doors due to crowd disturbances during Colo-Colo's previous home match against River Plate.)
Referee: Esteban Ostojich (Uruguay)

=== Group G ===
Pos	Team	Pld	W	D	L	GF	GA	GD	Pts	Qualification	COL	CCP	OLI	PEÑ
1	(Argentina) Colón	6	3	1	2	8	8	0	10	Round of 16	—	2–1	2–1	2–1
2	(Paraguay) Cerro Porteño	6	2	2	2	5	4	+1	8	Round of 16	3–1	—	0–1	1–0
3	(Paraguay) Olimpia	6	2	2	2	4	4	0	8	Copa Sudamericana	0–0	0–0	—	1–0
4	(Uruguay) Peñarol	6	2	1	3	5	6	−1	7		2–1	0–0	2–1	—

Source: CONMEBOL
5 April 2022
18:15 UTC−4

Olimpia (Paraguay)	0–0	(Paraguay) Cerro Porteño
	Report

Estadio Defensores del Chaco, Asunción (Note: Olimpia played their home matches at Estadio Defensores del Chaco, Asunción instead of their regular stadium Estadio Manuel Ferreira, Asunción.)
Attendance: 30,017
Referee: Anderson Daronco (Brazil)
5 April 2022
19:15 UTC−3

Colón (Argentina)	2–1	(Uruguay) Peñarol
Rodríguez 31'; Farías 90'	Report	Ceppelini 69'

Estadio Brigadier General Estanislao López, Santa Fe
Attendance: 16,938
Referee: Wilton Sampaio (Brazil)

12 April 2022
18:15 UTC−4

Cerro Porteño (Paraguay)	3–1	(Argentina) Colón
Romero 41', 46'; Espínola 70'	Report	Meza 31'

Estadio General Pablo Rojas, Asunción
Referee: Roberto Tobar (Chile)
12 April 2022
21:30 UTC−3

Peñarol (Uruguay)	2–1	(Paraguay) Olimpia
Ramos 45+2'; Carrizo 49'	Report	W. González 80'

Estadio Campeón del Siglo, Montevideo
Attendance: 19,813
Referee: Raphael Claus (Brazil)

27 April 2022
20:00 UTC−4 (Note: The Cerro Porteño v Peñarol match, originally scheduled for 27 April 2022, 18:00 local time, was re-scheduled to 20:00 local time.)

Cerro Porteño (Paraguay)	1–0	(Uruguay) Peñarol
Cardozo 45+1'	Report

Estadio General Pablo Rojas, Asunción
Attendance: 25,617
Referee: Wilmar Roldán (Colombia)
28 April 2022
20:00 UTC−4

Olimpia (Paraguay)	0–0	(Argentina) Colón
	Report

Estadio Defensores del Chaco, Asunción
Referee: Jesús Valenzuela (Venezuela)

4 May 2022
19:00 UTC−3

Colón (Argentina)	2–1	(Paraguay) Cerro Porteño
Farías 22'; Bernardi 69'	Report	Moreno 73'

Estadio Brigadier General Estanislao López, Santa Fe
Referee: Raphael Claus (Brazil)
4 May 2022
20:00 UTC−4

Olimpia (Paraguay)	1–0	(Uruguay) Peñarol
Salcedo 33'	Report

Estadio Defensores del Chaco, Asunción
Attendance: 16,508
Referee: Anderson Daronco (Brazil)

17 May 2022
19:15 UTC−3

Peñarol (Uruguay)	0–0	(Paraguay) Cerro Porteño
	Report

Estadio Campeón del Siglo, Montevideo
Referee: Wilton Sampaio (Brazil)
18 May 2022
21:00 UTC−3

Colón (Argentina)	2–1	(Paraguay) Olimpia
Lértora 41', 84'	Report	Quintana 7'

Estadio Brigadier General Estanislao López, Santa Fe
Referee: Wilmar Roldán (Colombia)

25 May 2022
21:00 UTC−3

Peñarol (Uruguay)	2–1	(Argentina) Colón
Ceppelini 48'; Menosse 90+7'	Report	Farías 32'

Estadio Campeón del Siglo, Montevideo
Referee: Anderson Daronco (Brazil)
25 May 2022
20:00 UTC−4

Cerro Porteño (Paraguay)	0–1	(Paraguay) Olimpia
	Report	F. Cardozo 10'

Estadio General Pablo Rojas, Asunción
Attendance: 42,581
Referee: Raphael Claus (Brazil)

=== Group H ===
Pos	Team	Pld	W	D	L	GF	GA	GD	Pts	Qualification	FLA	TAL	UCA	CRI
1	(Brazil) Flamengo	6	5	1	0	15	6	+9	16	Round of 16	—	3–1	3–0	2–1
2	(Argentina) Talleres	6	3	2	1	6	5	+1	11	Round of 16	2–2	—	1–0	1–0
3	(Chile) Universidad Católica	6	1	1	4	5	10	−5	4	Copa Sudamericana	2–3	0–1	—	2–1
4	(Peru) Sporting Cristal	6	0	2	4	3	8	−5	2		0–2	0–0	1–1	—

Source: CONMEBOL
5 April 2022
20:00 UTC−5 (Note: The Sporting Cristal v Flamengo match, originally scheduled for 5 April 2022, 19:30 local time, was first suspended and later re-scheduled to 20:00 local time due to a curfew in Lima for that day which was lifted a few hours before the start of the match.)

Sporting Cristal (Peru)	0–2	(Brazil) Flamengo
	Report	Bruno Henrique 22'; Matheuzinho 87'

Estadio Nacional, Lima (Note: Sporting Cristal played their home matches at Estadio Nacional, Lima instead of their regular stadium Estadio Alberto Gallardo, Lima which did not meet CONMEBOL requirements.)
Attendance: 0 (Note: The Sporting Cristal v Flamengo match was played behind closed doors due to security reasons.)
Referee: Jhon Ospina (Colombia)
6 April 2022
19:00 UTC−3

Talleres (Argentina)	1–0	(Chile) Universidad Católica
Fértoli 24'	Report

Estadio Mario Alberto Kempes, Córdoba
Referee: Gustavo Tejera (Uruguay)

12 April 2022
18:15 UTC−4

Universidad Católica (Chile)	2–1	(Peru) Sporting Cristal
Núñez 45+2'; Zampedri 90+2' (pen.)	Report	Loyola 73'

Estadio San Carlos de Apoquindo, Santiago
Referee: Leodán González (Uruguay)
12 April 2022
21:30 UTC−3

Flamengo (Brazil)	3–1	(Argentina) Talleres
Gabriel Barbosa 11' (pen.); Éverton Ribeiro 26', 60'	Report	Fértoli 45+1'

Estádio do Maracanã, Rio de Janeiro
Attendance: 42,915
Referee: Jesús Valenzuela (Venezuela)

26 April 2022
21:30 UTC−3

Talleres (Argentina)	1–0	(Peru) Sporting Cristal
Esquivel 65'	Report

Estadio Mario Alberto Kempes, Córdoba
Attendance: 32,026
Referee: Mario Díaz de Vivar (Paraguay)
28 April 2022
18:00 UTC−4

Universidad Católica (Chile)	2–3	(Brazil) Flamengo
Isla 16' (o.g.); Pablo 90+4' (o.g.)	Report	Gabriel Barbosa 8', 35'; Lázaro 85'

Estadio San Carlos de Apoquindo, Santiago
Attendance: 10,464
Referee: José Argote (Venezuela)

4 May 2022
19:00 UTC−3

Talleres (Argentina)	2–2	(Brazil) Flamengo
Arão 34' (o.g.); Santos 57'	Report	De Arrascaeta 50'; Pedro 69'

Estadio Mario Alberto Kempes, Córdoba
Referee: Eber Aquino (Paraguay)
4 May 2022
21:00 UTC−5

Sporting Cristal (Peru)	1–1	(Chile) Universidad Católica
Liza 43'	Report	Zampedri 77'

Estadio Nacional, Lima
Referee: Andrés Rojas (Colombia)

17 May 2022
21:30 UTC−3

Flamengo (Brazil)	3–0	(Chile) Universidad Católica
Arão 7'; Éverton Ribeiro 39'; Pedro 90'	Report

Estádio do Maracanã, Rio de Janeiro
Attendance: 43,532
Referee: Jhon Ospina (Colombia)
17 May 2022
19:30 UTC−5

Sporting Cristal (Peru)	0–0	(Argentina) Talleres
	Report

Estadio Nacional, Lima
Referee: Luis Quiroz (Ecuador)

24 May 2022
21:30 UTC−3

Flamengo (Brazil)	2–1	(Peru) Sporting Cristal
Isla 30'; Pedro 74'	Report	Gonzáles 85'

Estádio do Maracanã, Rio de Janeiro
Attendance: 38,100
Referee: Alexis Herrera (Venezuela)
24 May 2022
20:30 UTC−4

Universidad Católica (Chile)	0–1	(Argentina) Talleres
	Report	Esquivel 61'

Estadio San Carlos de Apoquindo, Santiago
Referee: Gery Vargas (Bolivia)
