= 2022 Copa Libertadores final =

- Match programme cover
- Event: 2022 Copa Libertadores
Flamengo	Athletico Paranaense
(Brazil)	(Brazil)
1	0
- Date: 29 October 2022
- Venue: Estadio Monumental Isidro Romero Carbo, Guayaquil
- Man of the Match: Gabriel Barbosa (Flamengo)
- Referee: Patricio Loustau (Argentina)
- Attendance: 42,517

The 2022 Copa Libertadores final was the final match which decided the winner of the 2022 Copa Libertadores. This was the 63rd edition of the Copa Libertadores, the top-tier South American continental club football tournament organized by CONMEBOL. The match was played on 29 October 2022 at the Estadio Monumental in Guayaquil, Ecuador, between Brazilian sides Flamengo and Athletico Paranaense.

Flamengo defeated Athletico Paranaense by a 1–0 score to win their third title in the tournament. As winners of the 2022 Copa Libertadores, they qualified for the 2022 FIFA Club World Cup and earned the right to play against the winners of the 2022 Copa Sudamericana in the 2023 Recopa Sudamericana. They also automatically qualified for the 2023 Copa Libertadores group stage.

== Venue ==
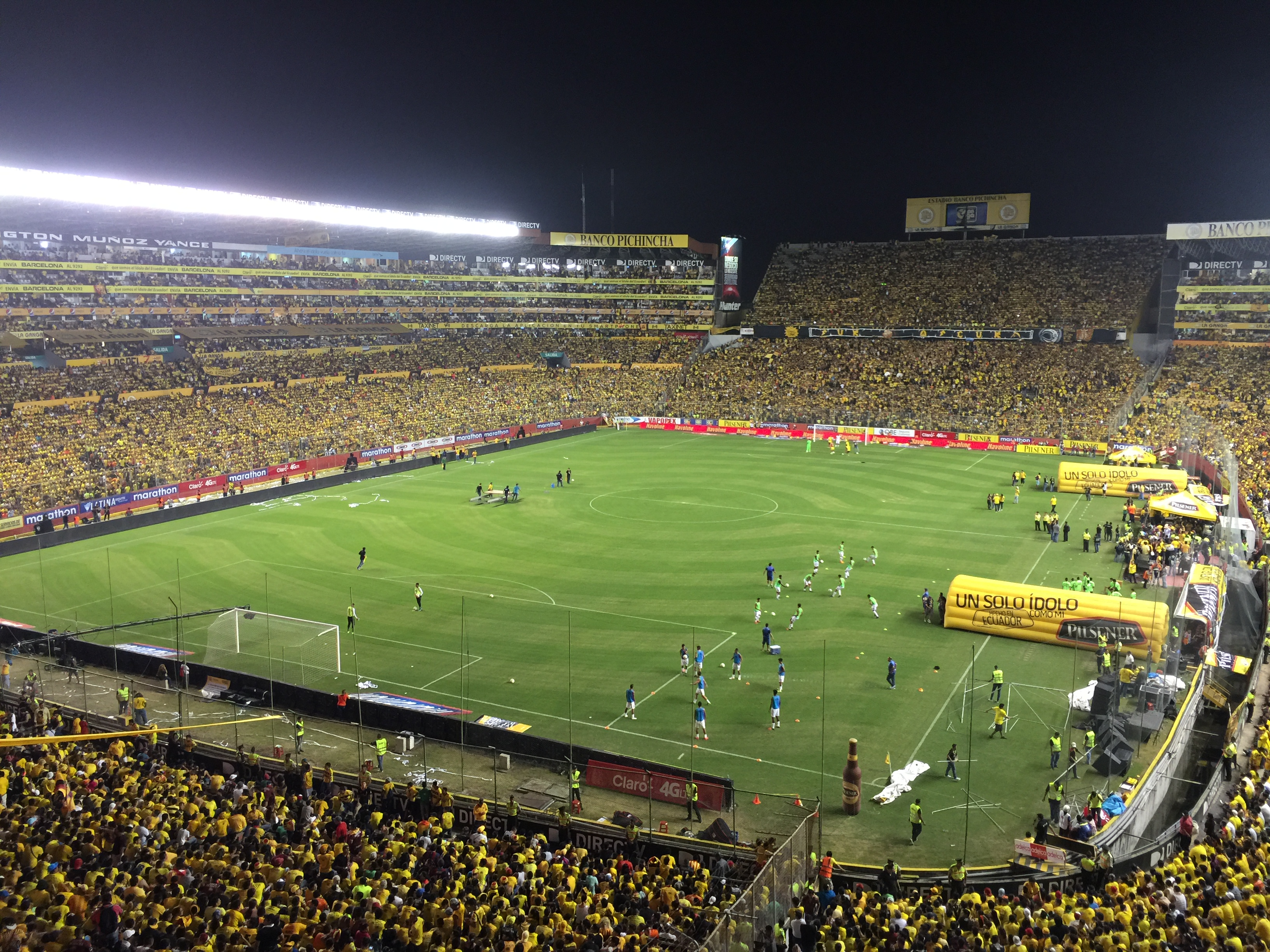
Estadio Monumental in Guayaquil hosted the final

Bidding Venues for the 2022 Copa Libertadores final
Association	Stadium	City	Capacity
Argentina	El Cilindro	Avellaneda	61,000
Argentina	Estadio Libertadores de América	Avellaneda	48,069
Argentina	Estadio Monumental	Buenos Aires	70,074
Argentina	La Bombonera	Buenos Aires	54,000
Argentina	Estadio Mario Alberto Kempes	Córdoba	57,000
Brazil	Arena da Baixada	Curitiba	42,372
Brazil	Estádio Beira-Rio	Porto Alegre	50,128
Brazil	Maracanã	Rio de Janeiro	78,838
Brazil	Estádio do Morumbi	São Paulo	67,052
Brazil	Arena Corinthians	São Paulo	49,205
Chile	Estadio Nacional Julio Martínez Prádanos	Santiago	58,665
Ecuador	Estadio Monumental	Guayaquil	59,283
Peru	Estadio Monumental	Lima	80,093
Peru	Estadio Nacional del Perú	Lima	50,000
Uruguay	Estadio Centenario	Montevideo	60,235

== Teams ==
Team	Previous finals appearances (bold indicates winners)
(Brazil) Flamengo	3 (**1981**, **2019**, 2021)
(Brazil) Athletico Paranaense	1 (2005)

== Road to the final ==
Note: In all scores below, the score of the home team is given first.

(Brazil) Flamengo			Round	(Brazil) Athletico Paranaense		
Opponent	Venue	Score		Opponent	Venue	Score
Bye			Qualifying stages	Bye		
**Group H**			Group stage	**Group B**		
(Peru) Sporting Cristal	Away	0–2	Group stage	(Venezuela) Caracas	Away	0–0
(Argentina) Talleres	Home	3–1	Group stage	(Bolivia) The Strongest	Home	1–0
(Chile) Universidad Católica	Away	2–3	Group stage	(Paraguay) Libertad	Away	1–0
(Argentina) Talleres	Away	2–2	Group stage	(Bolivia) The Strongest	Away	5–0
(Chile) Universidad Católica	Home	3–0	Group stage	(Paraguay) Libertad	Home	2–0
(Peru) Sporting Cristal	Home	2–1	Group stage	(Venezuela) Caracas	Home	5–1
Pos / Team / Pld / Pts; **1** / (Brazil) Flamengo / **6** / **16**; 2 / (Argentina) Talleres / 6 / **11**; 3 / (Chile) Universidad Católica / 6 / **4**; 4 / (Peru) Sporting Cristal / 6 / **2**; Source: CONMEBOL			Group stage	Pos / Team / Pld / Pts; 1 / (Paraguay) Libertad / 6 / **10**; **2** / (Brazil) Athletico Paranaense / **6** / **10**; 3 / (Bolivia) The Strongest / 6 / **6**; 4 / (Venezuela) Caracas / 6 / **6**; Source: CONMEBOL		
**Seed 3**			Final stages	**Seed 12**		
(Colombia) Deportes Tolima (won 8–1 on aggregate)	Away	0–1	Round of 16	(Paraguay) Libertad (won 3–2 on aggregate)	Home	2–1
(Colombia) Deportes Tolima (won 8–1 on aggregate)	Home	7–1	Round of 16	(Paraguay) Libertad (won 3–2 on aggregate)	Away	1–1
(Brazil) Corinthians (won 3–0 on aggregate)	Away	0–2	Quarter-finals	(Argentina) Estudiantes (won 1–0 on aggregate)	Home	0–0
(Brazil) Corinthians (won 3–0 on aggregate)	Home	1–0	Quarter-finals	(Argentina) Estudiantes (won 1–0 on aggregate)	Away	0–1
(Argentina) Vélez Sarsfield (won 6–1 on aggregate)	Away	0–4	Semi-finals	(Brazil) Palmeiras (won 3–2 on aggregate)	Home	1–0
(Argentina) Vélez Sarsfield (won 6–1 on aggregate)	Home	2–1	Semi-finals	(Brazil) Palmeiras (won 3–2 on aggregate)	Away	2–2

== Match ==
=== Summary ===
Guillermo Varela, Rodrigo Caio, Bruno Henrique (Flamengo), Julimar, Reinaldo and Marcelo Cirino (Athletico Paranaense) were ruled out of the final due to injuries. Gabriel Barbosa, who would be declared Man of the Match in the final, got the only goal of the game in added time in the first half when he side-footed in a low cross from the right at the far post.

=== Details ===
29 October 2022
15:00 UTC−5

Flamengo (Brazil)	1–0	(Brazil) Athletico Paranaense
Gabriel Barbosa 45+4'	Report

Estadio Monumental Isidro Romero Carbo, Guayaquil
Attendance: 42,517
Referee: Patricio Loustau (Argentina)

**Flamengo**	**Athletico Paranaense**

GK	20	(Brazil) Santos
RB	22	(Brazil) Rodinei
CB	23	(Brazil) David Luiz
CB	4	(Brazil) Léo Pereira
LB	16	(Brazil) Filipe Luís		(substituted off) 20'
DM	8	(Brazil) Thiago Maia		(substituted off) 71'
RM	7	(Brazil) Éverton Ribeiro (c)
LM	35	(Brazil) João Gomes
AM	14	(Uruguay) Giorgian de Arrascaeta	(yellow card) 68'	(substituted off) 84'
CF	9	(Brazil) Gabriel Barbosa		(substituted off) 84'
CF	21	(Brazil) Pedro
Substitutes:
GK	1	(Brazil) Diego Alves
DF	15	(Brazil) Fabrício Bruno
DF	26	(Brazil) Ayrton Lucas		(substituted on) 20'
DF	30	(Brazil) Pablo
DF	34	(Brazil) Matheuzinho
MF	2	(Chile) Erick Pulgar
MF	5	(Chile) Arturo Vidal	(yellow card) 75'	(substituted on) 71'
MF	10	(Brazil) Diego
MF	29	(Brazil) Victor Hugo		(substituted on) 84'
MF	42	(Brazil) Matheus França
FW	18	(Brazil) Everton		(substituted on) 84'
FW	31	(Brazil) Marinho
Manager:
(Brazil) Dorival Júnior

GK	1	(Brazil) Bento
RB	13	(Brazil) Khellven
CB	34	(Brazil) Pedro Henrique	(yellow card) 28' (yellow-red card) 43'
CB	44	(Brazil) Thiago Heleno (c)
LB	16	(Brazil) Abner Vinícius
DM	50	(Brazil) Fernandinho
RM	17	(Brazil) Hugo Moura		(substituted off) 75'
LM	38	(Brazil) Alex Santana	(yellow card) 43'	(substituted off) 46'
AM	8	(Brazil) Vitor Bueno		(substituted off) 57'
CF	11	(Brazil) Vitinho		(substituted off) 57'
CF	27	(Brazil) Vitor Roque		(substituted off) 65'
Substitutes:
GK	12	(Brazil) Anderson
DF	22	(Colombia) Nicolás Hernández
DF	24	(Colombia) Luis Manuel Orejuela
DF	42	(Brazil) Matheus Felipe		(substituted on) 46'
DF	48	(Brazil) Pedrinho
MF	18	(Brazil) Léo Cittadini
MF	26	(Brazil) Erick
MF	28	(Argentina) Tomás Cuello
FW	5	(Brazil) Pablo		(substituted on) 65'
FW	9	(Uruguay) Agustín Canobbio		(substituted on) 57'
FW	20	(Uruguay) David Terans		(substituted on) 75'
FW	35	(Brazil) Rômulo	(yellow card) 73'	(substituted on) 57'
Manager:
(Brazil) Luiz Felipe Scolari

Man of the Match:
Gabriel Barbosa (Flamengo)

Assistant referees:
Diego Bonfá (Argentina)
Ezequiel Brailovsky (Argentina)
Fourth official:
Facundo Tello (Argentina)
Fifth official:
Facundo Rodríguez (Argentina)
Video assistant referee:
Mauro Vigliano (Argentina)
Assistant video assistant referees:
Germán Delfino (Argentina)
Juan Pablo Belatti (Argentina)
Nicolás Gallo (Colombia)

**Match rules**

- 90 minutes.
- 30 minutes of extra time if necessary.
- Penalty shoot-out if scores still level.
- Twelve named substitutes.
- Maximum of five substitutions, with a sixth allowed in extra time.

== See also ==
- 2022 Copa Sudamericana final
- 2023 Recopa Sudamericana
