= 2022 Copa Libertadores final stages =

The 2022 Copa Libertadores final stages were played from 28 June to 29 October 2022. A total of 16 teams competed in the final stages to decide the champions of the 2022 Copa Libertadores, with the final played in Guayaquil, Ecuador at Estadio Monumental Isidro Romero Carbo.

== Qualified teams ==
The winners and runners-up of each of the eight groups in the group stage advanced to the round of 16.

Group	Winners	Runners-up
A	(Brazilian Football Confederation) Palmeiras	(Ecuadorian Football Federation) Emelec
B	(Paraguayan Football Association) Libertad	(Brazilian Football Confederation) Athletico Paranaense
C	(Argentine Football Association) Estudiantes	(Argentine Football Association) Vélez Sarsfield
D	(Brazilian Football Confederation) Atlético Mineiro	(Colombian Football Federation) Deportes Tolima
E	(Argentine Football Association) Boca Juniors	(Brazilian Football Confederation) Corinthians
F	(Argentine Football Association) River Plate	(Brazilian Football Confederation) Fortaleza
G	(Argentine Football Association) Colón	(Paraguayan Football Association) Cerro Porteño
H	(Brazilian Football Confederation) Flamengo	(Argentine Football Association) Talleres

=== Seeding ===
Starting from the round of 16, the teams were seeded according to their results in the group stage, with the group winners (Pot 1) seeded 1–8, and the group runners-up (Pot 2) seeded 9–16.

Seed	Grp	Team	Pld	W	D	L	GF	GA	GD	Pts	Round of 16 draw
1	A	(Brazilian Football Confederation) Palmeiras	6	6	0	0	25	3	+22	18	Pot 1
2	F	(Argentine Football Association) River Plate	6	5	1	0	18	3	+15	16	Pot 1
3	H	(Brazilian Football Confederation) Flamengo	6	5	1	0	15	6	+9	16	Pot 1
4	C	(Argentine Football Association) Estudiantes	6	4	1	1	8	5	+3	13	Pot 1
5	D	(Brazilian Football Confederation) Atlético Mineiro	6	3	2	1	10	6	+4	11	Pot 1
6	B	(Paraguayan Football Association) Libertad	6	3	1	2	8	6	+2	10	Pot 1
7	G	(Argentine Football Association) Colón	6	3	1	2	8	8	0	10	Pot 1
8	E	(Argentine Football Association) Boca Juniors	6	3	1	2	5	5	0	10	Pot 1
9	D	(Colombian Football Federation) Deportes Tolima	6	3	2	1	10	9	+1	11	Pot 2
10	H	(Argentine Football Association) Talleres	6	3	2	1	6	5	+1	11	Pot 2
11	F	(Brazilian Football Confederation) Fortaleza	6	3	1	2	10	9	+1	10	Pot 2
12	B	(Brazilian Football Confederation) Athletico Paranaense	6	3	1	2	8	7	+1	10	Pot 2
13	E	(Brazilian Football Confederation) Corinthians	6	2	3	1	5	4	+1	9	Pot 2
14	A	(Ecuadorian Football Federation) Emelec	6	2	2	2	14	7	+7	8	Pot 2
15	C	(Argentine Football Association) Vélez Sarsfield	6	2	2	2	12	11	+1	8	Pot 2
16	G	(Paraguayan Football Association) Cerro Porteño	6	2	2	2	5	4	+1	8	Pot 2

Source: CONMEBOL
Rules for classification: 1) Higher position in group; 2) Points; 3) Goal difference; 4) Goals scored; 5) Away goals scored; 6) CONMEBOL ranking (Regulations Article 2.4.2).

== Format ==
Starting from the round of 16, the teams played a single-elimination tournament with the following rules:

- In the round of 16, quarter-finals and semi-finals, each tie was played on a home-and-away two-legged basis, with the higher-seeded team hosting the second leg (Regulations Article 2.2.3.2). If tied on aggregate, extra time was not played, and a penalty shoot-out was used to determine the winners (Regulations Article 2.4.3).
- The final was played as a single match at a venue pre-selected by CONMEBOL, with the higher-seeded team designated as the "home" team for administrative purposes (Regulations Article 2.2.3.5). If tied after regulation, 30 minutes of extra time were played. If still tied after extra time, a penalty shoot-out was used to determine the winners (Regulations Article 2.4.4).

== Draw ==
The draw for the round of 16 was held on 27 May 2022, 12:00 PYT (UTC−4) at the CONMEBOL Convention Center in Luque, Paraguay. For the round of 16, the 16 teams were drawn into eight ties (A–H) between a group winner (Pot 1) and a group runner-up (Pot 2), with the group winners hosting the second leg. Teams from the same association or the same group could be drawn into the same tie (Regulations Article 2.2.3.2).

== Bracket ==
The bracket starting from the round of 16 was determined as follows:

Round	Matchups
Round of 16	(Group winners host second leg, matchups decided by draw): Match A; Match B; Match C; Match D; Match E; Match F; Match G; Match H
Quarter-finals	(Higher-seeded team host second leg): Match S1: Winner A vs. Winner H; Match S2: Winner B vs. Winner G; Match S3: Winner C vs. Winner F; Match S4: Winner D vs. Winner E
Semi-finals	(Higher-seeded team host second leg): Match F1: Winner S1 vs. Winner S4; Match F2: Winner S2 vs. Winner S3
Final	(Higher-seeded team designated as "home" team): Winner F1 vs. Winner F2

The bracket was decided based on the round of 16 draw, which was held on 27 May 2022.

Round of 16
15	(Argentine Football Association) Vélez Sarsfield	1	0	1
2	(Argentine Football Association) River Plate	0	0	0
10	(Argentine Football Association) Talleres	1	2	3
7	(Argentine Football Association) Colón	1	0	1
13	(Brazilian Football Confederation) Corinthians (p)	0	0	0 (6)
8	(Argentine Football Association) Boca Juniors	0	0	0 (5)
9	(Colombian Football Federation) Deportes Tolima	0	1	1
3	(Brazilian Football Confederation) Flamengo	1	7	8
12	(Brazilian Football Confederation) Athletico Paranaense	2	1	3
6	(Paraguayan Football Association) Libertad	1	1	2
11	(Brazilian Football Confederation) Fortaleza	1	0	1
4	(Argentine Football Association) Estudiantes	1	3	4
14	(Ecuadorian Football Federation) Emelec	1	0	1
5	(Brazilian Football Confederation) Atlético Mineiro	1	1	2
16	(Paraguayan Football Association) Cerro Porteño	0	0	0
1	(Brazilian Football Confederation) Palmeiras	3	5	8

Quarter-finals
15	(Argentine Football Association) Vélez Sarsfield	3	1	4
10	(Argentine Football Association) Talleres	2	0	2
13	(Brazilian Football Confederation) Corinthians	0	0	0
3	(Brazilian Football Confederation) Flamengo	2	1	3
12	(Brazilian Football Confederation) Athletico Paranaense	0	1	1
4	(Argentine Football Association) Estudiantes	0	0	0
5	(Brazilian Football Confederation) Atlético Mineiro	2	0	2 (5)
1	(Brazilian Football Confederation) Palmeiras (p)	2	0	2 (6)

Semi-finals
15	(Argentine Football Association) Vélez Sarsfield	0	1	1
3	(Brazilian Football Confederation) Flamengo	4	2	6
12	(Brazilian Football Confederation) Athletico Paranaense	1	2	3
1	(Brazilian Football Confederation) Palmeiras	0	2	2

Final
29 October – Guayaquil
3	(Brazilian Football Confederation) Flamengo	1
12	(Brazilian Football Confederation) Athletico Paranaense	0

== Round of 16 ==
The first legs were played on 28–30 June, and the second legs were played on 5–7 July 2022.

Team 1	Agg.	Team 2	1st leg	2nd leg
Athletico Paranaense (Brazil)	3–2	(Paraguay) Libertad	2–1	1–1
Deportes Tolima (Colombia)	1–8	(Brazil) Flamengo	0–1	1–7
Vélez Sarsfield (Argentina)	1–0	(Argentina) River Plate	1–0	0–0
Emelec (Ecuador)	1–2	(Brazil) Atlético Mineiro	1–1	0–1
Cerro Porteño (Paraguay)	0–8	(Brazil) Palmeiras	0–3	0–5
Talleres (Argentina)	3–1	(Argentina) Colón	1–1	2–0
Corinthians (Brazil)	0–0 (6–5 p)	(Argentina) Boca Juniors	0–0	0–0
Fortaleza (Brazil)	1–4	(Argentina) Estudiantes	1–1	0–3

=== Match A ===
28 June 2022
21:30 UTC−3

Athletico Paranaense (Brazilian Football Confederation)	2–1	(Paraguayan Football Association) Libertad
Vitor Roque 6'; Hernández 32'	Report	Villalba 20'

Arena da Baixada, Curitiba
Attendance: 27,567
Referee: Alexis Herrera (Venezuela)

5 July 2022
20:30 UTC−4

Libertad (Paraguayan Football Association)	1–1	(Brazilian Football Confederation) Athletico Paranaense
Santa Cruz 45+4'	Report	Rômulo 90'

Estadio Defensores del Chaco, Asunción (Note: Libertad played their home match at Estadio Defensores del Chaco, Asunción, instead of their regular stadium Estadio La Huerta, Asunción which did not meet CONMEBOL requirements.)
Attendance: 12,735
Referee: Andrés Cunha (Uruguay)

Athletico Paranaense won 3–2 on aggregate and advanced to the quarter-finals (Match S1).

=== Match B ===
29 June 2022
19:30 UTC−5

Deportes Tolima (Colombian Football Federation)	0–1	(Brazilian Football Confederation) Flamengo
	Report	Andreas Pereira 17'

Estadio Manuel Murillo Toro, Ibagué
Attendance: 11,850
Referee: Jesús Valenzuela (Venezuela)

6 July 2022
21:30 UTC−3

Flamengo (Brazilian Football Confederation)	7–1	(Colombian Football Federation) Deportes Tolima
Pedro 5', 47', 67', 79'; Quiñónes 20' (o.g.); Gabriel Barbosa 56'; Matheus França 73'	Report	Quiñónes 63'

Estádio do Maracanã, Rio de Janeiro
Attendance: 61,871
Referee: Mario Díaz de Vivar (Paraguay)

Flamengo won 8–1 on aggregate and advanced to the quarter-finals (Match S2).

=== Match C ===
29 June 2022
21:30 UTC−3

Vélez Sarsfield (Argentine Football Association)	1–0	(Argentine Football Association) River Plate
Janson 15' (pen.)	Report

Estadio José Amalfitani, Buenos Aires
Referee: Raphael Claus (Brazil)

6 July 2022
21:30 UTC−3

River Plate (Argentine Football Association)	0–0	(Argentine Football Association) Vélez Sarsfield
	Report

Estadio Monumental Antonio Vespucio Liberti, Buenos Aires
Attendance: 59,669
Referee: Roberto Tobar (Chile)

Vélez Sarsfield won 1–0 on aggregate and advanced to the quarter-finals (Match S3).

=== Match D ===
28 June 2022
17:15 UTC−5

Emelec (Ecuadorian Football Federation)	1–1	(Brazilian Football Confederation) Atlético Mineiro
S. Rodríguez 58' (pen.)	Report	Ademir 16'

Estadio George Capwell, Guayaquil
Referee: Fernando Rapallini (Argentina)

5 July 2022
19:15 UTC−3

Atlético Mineiro (Brazilian Football Confederation)	1–0	(Ecuadorian Football Federation) Emelec
Hulk 79' (pen.)	Report

Mineirão, Belo Horizonte
Attendance: 56,421
Referee: Jesús Valenzuela (Venezuela)

Atlético Mineiro won 2–1 on aggregate and advanced to the quarter-finals (Match S4).

=== Match E ===
29 June 2022
18:15 UTC−4

Cerro Porteño (Paraguayan Football Association)	0–3	(Brazilian Football Confederation) Palmeiras
	Report	Rony 60', 69'; Murilo 87'

Estadio General Pablo Rojas, Asunción
Referee: Wilmar Roldán (Colombia)

6 July 2022
19:15 UTC−3

Palmeiras (Brazilian Football Confederation)	5–0	(Paraguayan Football Association) Cerro Porteño
Samudio 37' (o.g.); Rony 73', 83'; Breno Lopes 75'; Gómez 78'	Report

Allianz Parque, São Paulo
Attendance: 37,431
Referee: Patricio Loustau (Argentina)

Palmeiras won 8–0 on aggregate and advanced to the quarter-finals (Match S4).

=== Match F ===
29 June 2022
19:15 UTC−3

Talleres (Argentine Football Association)	1–1	(Argentine Football Association) Colón
Franco 87'	Report	Ábila 61'

Estadio Mario Alberto Kempes, Córdoba
Referee: Wilton Sampaio (Brazil)

6 July 2022
19:15 UTC−3

Colón (Argentine Football Association)	0–2	(Argentine Football Association) Talleres
	Report	Girotti 47'; Martino 90+7'

Estadio Brigadier General Estanislao López, Santa Fe
Attendance: 17,235
Referee: Anderson Daronco (Brazil)

Talleres won 3–1 on aggregate and advanced to the quarter-finals (Match S3).

=== Match G ===
28 June 2022
21:30 UTC−3

Corinthians (Brazilian Football Confederation)	0–0	(Argentine Football Association) Boca Juniors
	Report

Neo Química Arena, São Paulo
Referee: Roberto Tobar (Chile)

5 July 2022
21:30 UTC−3

Boca Juniors (Argentine Football Association)	0–0	(Brazilian Football Confederation) Corinthians
	Report
Penalties
Rojo (penalty scored); Izquierdoz (penalty scored); Villa (penalty missed); Fernández (penalty scored); Benedetto (penalty missed); Romero (penalty scored); Varela (penalty scored); Ramírez (penalty missed)	5–6	(penalty scored) Fábio Santos; (penalty scored) Cantillo; (penalty missed) Raul Gustavo; (penalty missed) Bruno Melo; (penalty scored) Róger Guedes; (penalty scored) Roni; (penalty scored) Piton; (penalty scored) Gil

Estadio Alberto J. Armando, Buenos Aires
Attendance: 49,600
Referee: Andrés Matonte (Uruguay)

Tied 0–0 on aggregate, Corinthians won on penalties and advanced to the quarter-finals (Match S2).

=== Match H ===
30 June 2022
21:30 UTC−3

Fortaleza (Brazilian Football Confederation)	1–1	(Argentine Football Association) Estudiantes
Romero 55'	Report	Díaz 63'

Castelão, Fortaleza
Referee: Andrés Matonte (Uruguay)

7 July 2022
21:30 UTC−3

Estudiantes (Argentine Football Association)	3–0	(Brazilian Football Confederation) Fortaleza
Castro 9', 47'; Zapiola 57'	Report

Estadio Jorge Luis Hirschi, La Plata
Attendance: 19,942
Referee: Esteban Ostojich (Uruguay)

Estudiantes won 4–1 on aggregate and advanced to the quarter-finals (Match S1).

== Quarter-finals ==
The first legs were played on 2–4 August, and the second legs were played on 9–11 August 2022.

Team 1	Agg.	Team 2	1st leg	2nd leg
Athletico Paranaense (Brazil)	1–0	(Argentina) Estudiantes	0–0	1–0
Corinthians (Brazil)	0–3	(Brazil) Flamengo	0–2	0–1
Vélez Sarsfield (Argentina)	4–2	(Argentina) Talleres	3–2	1–0
Atlético Mineiro (Brazil)	2–2 (5–6 p)	(Brazil) Palmeiras	2–2	0–0

=== Match S1 ===
4 August 2022
21:30 UTC−3

Athletico Paranaense (Brazilian Football Confederation)	0–0	(Argentine Football Association) Estudiantes
	Report

Arena da Baixada, Curitiba
Attendance: 34,173
Referee: Jesús Valenzuela (Venezuela)

11 August 2022
21:30 UTC−3

Estudiantes (Argentine Football Association)	0–1	(Brazilian Football Confederation) Athletico Paranaense
	Report	Vitor Roque 90+6'

Estadio Jorge Luis Hirschi, La Plata
Attendance: 20,544
Referee: Andrés Matonte (Uruguay)

Athletico Paranaense won 1–0 on aggregate and advanced to the semi-finals (Match F1).

=== Match S2 ===
2 August 2022
21:30 UTC−3

Corinthians (Brazilian Football Confederation)	0–2	(Brazilian Football Confederation) Flamengo
	Report	De Arrascaeta 37'; Gabriel Barbosa 51'

Neo Química Arena, São Paulo
Attendance: 45,349
Referee: Patricio Loustau (Argentina)

9 August 2022
21:30 UTC−3

Flamengo (Brazilian Football Confederation)	1–0	(Brazilian Football Confederation) Corinthians
Pedro 52'	Report

Estádio do Maracanã, Rio de Janeiro
Attendance: 68,418
Referee: Esteban Ostojich (Uruguay)

Flamengo won 3–0 on aggregate and advanced to the semi-finals (Match F2).

=== Match S3 ===
3 August 2022
21:30 UTC−3

Vélez Sarsfield (Argentine Football Association)	3–2	(Argentine Football Association) Talleres
Janson 5', 73'; Fernández 90'	Report	Santos 81'; Garro 87'

Estadio José Amalfitani, Buenos Aires
Attendance: 22,935
Referee: Wilmar Roldán (Colombia)

10 August 2022
21:30 UTC−3

Talleres (Argentine Football Association)	0–1	(Argentine Football Association) Vélez Sarsfield
	Report	Fernández 79'

Estadio Mario Alberto Kempes, Córdoba
Attendance: 52,265
Referee: Eber Aquino (Paraguay)

Vélez Sarsfield won 4–2 on aggregate and advanced to the semi-finals (Match F2).

=== Match S4 ===
3 August 2022
21:30 UTC−3

Atlético Mineiro (Brazilian Football Confederation)	2–2	(Brazilian Football Confederation) Palmeiras
Hulk 45+1' (pen.); Murilo 47' (o.g.)	Report	Murilo 59'; Danilo 90+2'

Mineirão, Belo Horizonte
Attendance: 57,140
Referee: Facundo Tello (Argentina)

10 August 2022
21:30 UTC−3

Palmeiras (Brazilian Football Confederation)	0–0	(Brazilian Football Confederation) Atlético Mineiro
	Report
Penalties
Veiga (penalty scored); Gómez (penalty scored); Zé Rafael (penalty scored); Piquerez (penalty scored); Rony (penalty scored); Murilo (penalty scored)	6–5	(penalty scored) Hulk; (penalty scored) Fernández; (penalty scored) Jair; (penalty scored) Eduardo Sasha; (penalty scored) Alonso; (penalty missed) Rubens

Allianz Parque, São Paulo
Attendance: 40,433
Referee: Wilmar Roldán (Colombia)

Tied 2–2 on aggregate, Palmeiras won on penalties and advanced to the semi-finals (Match F1).

== Semi-finals ==
The first legs were played on 30 and 31 August, and the second legs were played on 6 and 7 September 2022.

Team 1	Agg.	Team 2	1st leg	2nd leg
Athletico Paranaense (Brazil)	3–2	(Brazil) Palmeiras	1–0	2–2
Vélez Sarsfield (Argentina)	1–6	(Brazil) Flamengo	0–4	1–2

=== Match F1 ===
30 August 2022
21:30 UTC−3

Athletico Paranaense (Brazilian Football Confederation)	1–0	(Brazilian Football Confederation) Palmeiras
Alex Santana 23'	Report

Arena da Baixada, Curitiba
Attendance: 38,963
Referee: Roberto Tobar (Chile)

6 September 2022
21:30 UTC−3

Palmeiras (Brazilian Football Confederation)	2–2	(Brazilian Football Confederation) Athletico Paranaense
Scarpa 3'; Gómez 55'	Report	Pablo 64'; Terans 85'

Allianz Parque, São Paulo
Attendance: 40,590
Referee: Esteban Ostojich (Uruguay)

Athletico Paranaense won 3–2 on aggregate and advanced to the final.

=== Match F2 ===
31 August 2022
21:30 UTC−3

Vélez Sarsfield (Argentine Football Association)	0–4	(Brazilian Football Confederation) Flamengo
	Report	Pedro 32', 61', 83'; Éverton Ribeiro 45+1'

Estadio José Amalfitani, Buenos Aires
Attendance: 20,450
Referee: Wilmar Roldán (Colombia)

7 September 2022
21:30 UTC−3

Flamengo (Brazilian Football Confederation)	2–1	(Argentine Football Association) Vélez Sarsfield
Pedro 42'; Marinho 68'	Report	Pratto 21'

Estádio do Maracanã, Rio de Janeiro
Attendance: 66,635
Referee: Piero Maza (Chile)

Flamengo won 6–1 on aggregate and advanced to the final.

== Final ==
The final was played on 29 October 2022 at Estadio Monumental Isidro Romero Carbo in Guayaquil.

29 October 2022
15:00 UTC−5

Flamengo (Brazil)	1–0	(Brazil) Athletico Paranaense
Gabriel Barbosa 45+4'	Report

Estadio Monumental Isidro Romero Carbo, Guayaquil
Attendance: 42,517
Referee: Patricio Loustau (Argentina)
