= 2022 Copa Libertadores qualifying stages =

Football tournament

The 2022 Copa Libertadores qualifying stages were played from 8 February to 17 March 2022. A total of 19 teams competed in the qualifying stages to decide four of the 32 places in the group stage of the 2022 Copa Libertadores.

== Draw ==
The draw for the qualifying stages was held on 20 December 2021, 12:00 PYST (UTC−3), at the CONMEBOL Convention Centre in Luque, Paraguay.

Teams were seeded by their CONMEBOL Clubs ranking as of 16 December 2021 (shown in parentheses), taking into account the following three factors:

1. Performance in the last 10 years, taking into account Copa Libertadores and Copa Sudamericana results in the period 2012–2021.
2. Historical coefficient, taking into account Copa Libertadores and Copa Sudamericana results in the period 1960–2011 and 2002–2011 respectively.
3. Local tournament champion, with bonus points awarded to domestic league champions of the last 10 years.

For the first stage, the six teams were drawn into three ties (E1–E3), with the teams from Pot 1 hosting the second leg.

First stage draw
Pot 1	Pot 2
(Paraguay) Olimpia (14); (Ecuador) Barcelona (18); (Bolivia) Bolívar (31)	(Venezuela) Deportivo Lara (75); (Uruguay) Montevideo City Torque (99); (Peru) Universidad César Vallejo (141)

For the second stage, the 16 teams were drawn into eight ties (C1–C8), with the teams from Pot 1 hosting the second leg. Teams from the same association cannot be drawn into the same tie, excluding the three winners of the first stage, which will be seeded in Pot 2 and whose identity will not be known at the time of the draw, and may be drawn into the same tie with another team from the same association.

Second stage draw
Pot 1	Pot 2
(Colombia) Atlético Nacional (9); (Brazil) Fluminense (30); (Argentina) Estudiantes (34); (Paraguay) Guaraní (38); (Bolivia) The Strongest (40); (Peru) Universitario (43); (Ecuador) Universidad Católica (120); (Venezuela) Monagas (133)	(Chile) Audax Italiano (152); (Chile) Everton (165); (Uruguay) Plaza Colonia (205); (Brazil) América Mineiro (No rank); (Colombia) Millonarios (52); First stage winner E1; First stage winner E2; First stage winner E3

Notes

1. ^{COL} The identity of the team Colombia 3 was not known at the time of the draw, and was seeded in Pot 2.

For the third stage, the eight winners of the second stage were allocated without any draw into the following four ties (G1–G4), with the team in each tie with the higher CONMEBOL ranking hosting the second leg.

- Second stage winner C1 vs. Second stage winner C8
- Second stage winner C2 vs. Second stage winner C7
- Second stage winner C3 vs. Second stage winner C6
- Second stage winner C4 vs. Second stage winner C5

== Format ==
In the qualifying stages, each tie was played on a home-and-away two-legged basis. If tied on aggregate, extra time was not played, and a penalty shoot-out was used to determine the winner (Regulations Article 2.4.3).

== Bracket ==
The qualifying stages were structured as follows:

- First stage (6 teams): The three winners of the first stage advanced to the second stage to join the 13 teams which were given byes to the second stage.
- Second stage (16 teams): The eight winners of the second stage advanced to the third stage.
- Third stage (8 teams): The four winners of the third stage advanced to the group stage to join the 28 direct entrants. The four teams eliminated in the third stage entered the Copa Sudamericana group stage.

The bracket was decided based on the first stage draw and second stage draw, which was held on 20 December 2021.

=== Winner G1 ===
First stage
(Colombia) Millonarios	Bye
(Brazil) Fluminense	Bye
(Peru) Universidad César Vallejo	0	0	0
(Paraguay) Olimpia	1	2	3
(Colombia) Atlético Nacional	Bye

Second stage
(Colombia) Millonarios	1	0	1
(Brazil) Fluminense	2	2	4
(Paraguay) Olimpia	3	1	4
(Colombia) Atlético Nacional	1	1	2

Third stage
(Brazil) Fluminense	3	0	3 (1)
(Paraguay) Olimpia (p)	1	2	3 (4)

=== Winner G2 ===
First stage
(Chile) Everton	Bye
(Venezuela) Monagas	Bye
(Chile) Audax Italiano	Bye
(Argentina) Estudiantes	Bye

Second stage
(Chile) Everton	3	0	3
(Venezuela) Monagas	0	1	1
(Chile) Audax Italiano	1	0	1
(Argentina) Estudiantes	0	2	2

Third stage
(Chile) Everton	0	0	0
(Argentina) Estudiantes	1	1	2

=== Winner G3 ===
First stage
(Venezuela) Deportivo Lara	2	0	2
(Bolivia) Bolívar	3	4	7
(Ecuador) Universidad Católica	Bye
(Uruguay) Plaza Colonia	Bye
(Bolivia) The Strongest	Bye

Second stage
(Bolivia) Bolívar	1	0	1
(Ecuador) Universidad Católica	1	2	3
(Uruguay) Plaza Colonia	2	0	2
(Bolivia) The Strongest	0	3	3

Third stage
(Ecuador) Universidad Católica	0	1	1
(Bolivia) The Strongest	0	2	2

=== Winner G4 ===
First stage
(Brazil) América Mineiro	Bye
(Paraguay) Guaraní	Bye
(Uruguay) Montevideo City Torque	1	0	1 (7)
(Ecuador) Barcelona (p)	1	0	1 (8)
(Peru) Universitario	Bye

Second stage
(Brazil) América Mineiro (p)	0	3	3 (5)
(Paraguay) Guaraní	1	2	3 (4)
(Ecuador) Barcelona	2	1	3
(Peru) Universitario	0	0	0

Third stage
(Brazil) América Mineiro (p)	0	0	0 (5)
(Ecuador) Barcelona	0	0	0 (4)

== First stage ==
The first legs were played on 8 and 9 February, and the second legs were played on 15 and 16 February 2022.

Team 1	Agg.	Team 2	1st leg	2nd leg
Montevideo City Torque (Uruguay)	1–1 (7–8 p)	(Ecuador) Barcelona	1–1	0–0
Deportivo Lara (Venezuela)	2–7	(Bolivia) Bolívar	2–3	0–4
Universidad César Vallejo (Peru)	0–3	(Paraguay) Olimpia	0–1	0–2

=== Match E1 ===
8 February 2022
21:30 UTC−3

Montevideo City Torque (Uruguay)	1–1	(Ecuador) Barcelona
Zeballos 64'	Report	Mastriani 7'

Estadio Centenario, Montevideo
Attendance: 1,817
Referee: Darío Herrera (Argentina)

15 February 2022
19:30 UTC−5

Barcelona (Ecuador)	0–0	(Uruguay) Montevideo City Torque
	Report
Penalties
Garcés (penalty scored); Perlaza (penalty scored); B. Castillo (penalty scored); Martínez (penalty scored); Piñatares (penalty scored); Preciado (penalty scored); E. Castillo (penalty scored); Leonai (penalty scored)	8–7	(penalty scored) Cejas; (penalty scored) Peña; (penalty scored) Arismendi; (penalty scored) Siri; (penalty scored) Allende; (penalty scored) Morales; (penalty scored) Guzmán; (penalty missed) Chocobar

Estadio Monumental Isidro Romero Carbo, Guayaquil
Referee: Anderson Daronco (Brazil)

Tied 1–1 on aggregate, Barcelona won on penalties and advanced to the second stage (Match C5).

=== Match E2 ===
9 February 2022
18:15 UTC−4

Deportivo Lara (Venezuela)	2–3	(Bolivia) Bolívar
Chirinos 2'; Meleán 28'	Report	Bruno Sávio 21'; Chico 34', 39'

Estadio Agustín Tovar, Barinas (Note: Deportivo Lara played their first stage home match at Estadio Agustín Tovar, Barinas instead of the originally scheduled Estadio Metropolitano, Cabudare.)
Attendance: 393
Referee: Eber Aquino (Paraguay)

16 February 2022
18:15 UTC−4

Bolívar (Bolivia)	4–0	(Venezuela) Deportivo Lara
Sagredo 37'; Bruno Sávio 68'; Guitián 76'; Miranda 82'	Report

Estadio Hernando Siles, La Paz
Referee: Wilton Sampaio (Brazil)

Bolívar won 7–2 on aggregate and advanced to the second stage (Match C3).

=== Match E3 ===
9 February 2022
19:30 UTC−5

Universidad César Vallejo (Peru)	0–1	(Paraguay) Olimpia
	Report	Recalde 29'

Estadio Nacional, Lima (Note: Universidad César Vallejo played their first stage home match at Estadio Nacional, Lima instead of their regular stadium Estadio Mansiche, Trujillo.)
Attendance: 2,177
Referee: Jesús Valenzuela (Venezuela)

16 February 2022
21:30 UTC−3

Olimpia (Paraguay)	2–0	(Peru) Universidad César Vallejo
Paiva 34'; Cardozo 83'	Report

Estadio Defensores del Chaco, Asunción (Note: Olimpia played their home matches at Estadio Defensores del Chaco, Asunción instead of their regular stadium Estadio Manuel Ferreira, Asunción.)
Attendance: 19,539
Referee: Facundo Tello (Argentina)

Olimpia won 3–0 on aggregate and advanced to the second stage (Match C8).

== Second stage ==
The first legs were played on 22–24 February, and the second legs were played on 1–3 March 2022.

Team 1	Agg.	Team 2	1st leg	2nd leg
Millonarios (Colombia)	1–4	(Brazil) Fluminense	1–2	0–2
Audax Italiano (Chile)	1–2	(Argentina) Estudiantes	1–0	0–2
Bolívar (Bolivia)	1–3	(Ecuador) Universidad Católica	1–1	0–2
América Mineiro (Brazil)	3–3 (5–4 p)	(Paraguay) Guaraní	0–1	3–2
Barcelona (Ecuador)	3–0	(Peru) Universitario	2–0	1–0
Plaza Colonia (Uruguay)	2–3	(Bolivia) The Strongest	2–0	0–3
Everton (Chile)	3–1	(Venezuela) Monagas	3–0	0–1
Olimpia (Paraguay)	4–2	(Colombia) Atlético Nacional	3–1	1–1

=== Match C1 ===
22 February 2022
19:30 UTC−5

Millonarios (Colombia)	1–2	(Brazil) Fluminense
Sosa 7'	Report	Braz 43'; Cano 77'

Estadio El Campín, Bogotá
Attendance: 30,098
Referee: Darío Herrera (Argentina)

1 March 2022
21:30 UTC−3

Fluminense (Brazil)	2–0	(Colombia) Millonarios
Willian 61'; Arias 73'	Report

Estádio São Januário, Rio de Janeiro (Note: Fluminense played their second stage home match at Estádio São Januário, Rio de Janeiro and played their third stage home match at Estádio Olímpico Nilton Santos, Rio de Janeiro instead of their regular stadium Estádio do Maracanã, Rio de Janeiro, which was temporarily closed for change of playing surface.)
Attendance: 15,767
Referee: Fernando Rapallini (Argentina)

Fluminense won 4–1 on aggregate and advanced to the third stage (Match G1).

=== Match C2 ===
23 February 2022
21:30 UTC−3

Audax Italiano (Chile)	1–0	(Argentina) Estudiantes
Henríquez 6'	Report

Estadio El Teniente, Rancagua (Note: Audax Italiano played their second stage home match at Estadio El Teniente, Rancagua instead of their regular stadium Estadio Bicentenario de La Florida, Santiago.)
Referee: Christian Ferreyra (Uruguay)

2 March 2022
21:30 UTC−3

Estudiantes (Argentina)	2–0	(Chile) Audax Italiano
Rogel 45+1'; Díaz 84'	Report

Estadio Jorge Luis Hirschi, La Plata
Attendance: 18,929
Referee: Wilton Sampaio (Brazil)

Estudiantes won 2–1 on aggregate and advanced to the third stage (Match G2).

=== Match C3 ===
23 February 2022
18:15 UTC−4

Bolívar (Bolivia)	1–1	(Ecuador) Universidad Católica
Chico 8'	Report	Díaz 11'

Estadio Hernando Siles, La Paz
Attendance: 12,038
Referee: Piero Maza (Chile)

2 March 2022
17:15 UTC−5

Universidad Católica (Ecuador)	2–0	(Bolivia) Bolívar
Zamora 10'; Díaz 35'	Report

Estadio Olímpico Atahualpa, Quito
Referee: Raphael Claus (Brazil)

Universidad Católica won 3–1 on aggregate and advanced to the third stage (Match G3).

=== Match C4 ===
23 February 2022
19:15 UTC−3

América Mineiro (Brazil)	0–1	(Paraguay) Guaraní
	Report	Colmán 90+1'

Estádio Independência, Belo Horizonte
Attendance: 6,409
Referee: Wilmar Roldán (Colombia)

2 March 2022
19:15 UTC−3

Guaraní (Paraguay)	2–3	(Brazil) América Mineiro
F. Fernández 13' (pen.); Cáceres 15'	Report	Wellington Paulista 59', 74'; Pedrinho 90+2'
Penalties
Ayala (penalty scored); Ortiz (penalty scored); Á. Benítez (penalty scored); Bareiro (penalty scored); Vásquez (penalty missed); Ferreira (penalty missed); Rob. Fernández (penalty missed)	4–5	(penalty scored) Wellington Paulista; (penalty scored) Iago Maidana; (penalty missed) Henrique Almeida; (penalty scored) Ramírez; (penalty scored) Rodolfo; (penalty missed) Patric; (penalty scored) Everaldo

Estadio Defensores del Chaco, Asunción (Note: Guaraní played their second stage home match at Estadio Defensores del Chaco, Asunción instead of their regular stadium Estadio Rogelio Livieres, Asunción, which did not meet CONMEBOL requirements.)
Referee: Facundo Tello (Argentina)

Tied 3–3 on aggregate, América Mineiro won on penalties and advanced to the third stage (Match G4).

=== Match C5 ===
23 February 2022
19:30 UTC−5

Barcelona (Ecuador)	2–0	(Peru) Universitario
E. Castillo 60'; Garcés 80'	Report

Estadio Monumental Isidro Romero Carbo, Guayaquil
Attendance: 32,842
Referee: José Argote (Venezuela)

2 March 2022
19:30 UTC−5

Universitario (Peru)	0–1	(Ecuador) Barcelona
	Report	Martínez 66'

Estadio Nacional, Lima (Note: Universitario played their second stage home match at Estadio Nacional, Lima instead of their regular stadium Estadio Monumental, Lima.)
Attendance: 30,701
Referee: Andrés Matonte (Uruguay)

Barcelona won 3–0 on aggregate and advanced to the third stage (Match G4).

=== Match C6 ===
22 February 2022
21:30 UTC−3

Plaza Colonia (Uruguay)	2–0	(Bolivia) The Strongest
Mascia 19', 39' (pen.)	Report

Estadio Centenario, Montevideo (Note: Plaza Colonia played their second stage home match at Estadio Centenario, Montevideo instead of their regular stadium Parque Cincuentenario Juan Prandi, Colonia del Sacramento, which did not meet CONMEBOL requirements.)
Referee: Bruno Arleu (Brazil)

1 March 2022
20:30 UTC−4

The Strongest (Bolivia)	3–0	(Uruguay) Plaza Colonia
Amaral 2'; Prost 6', 59'	Report

Estadio Hernando Siles, La Paz
Attendance: 9,493
Referee: Jhon Ospina (Colombia)

The Strongest won 3–2 on aggregate and advanced to the third stage (Match G3).

=== Match C7 ===
22 February 2022
19:15 UTC−3

Everton (Chile)	3–0	(Venezuela) Monagas
Di Yorio 17', 52'; Sosa 25'	Report

Estadio Sausalito, Viña del Mar
Attendance: 8,917
Referee: Ivo Méndez (Bolivia)

1 March 2022
18:15 UTC−4

Monagas (Venezuela)	1–0	(Chile) Everton
Ó. González 46'	Report

Estadio Monumental, Maturín
Attendance: 10,500
Referee: Gery Vargas (Bolivia)

Everton won 3–1 on aggregate and advanced to the third stage (Match G2).

=== Match C8 ===
24 February 2022
21:30 UTC−3

Olimpia (Paraguay)	3–1	(Colombia) Atlético Nacional
Silva 7'; Cardozo 81', 90+2'	Report	Barrera 46'

Estadio Defensores del Chaco, Asunción
Attendance: 29,605
Referee: Néstor Pitana (Argentina)

3 March 2022
19:30 UTC−5

Atlético Nacional (Colombia)	1–1	(Paraguay) Olimpia
Andrade 46'	Report	Salcedo 57'

Estadio Atanasio Girardot, Medellín
Attendance: 37,204
Referee: Patricio Loustau (Argentina)

Olimpia won 4–2 on aggregate and advanced to the third stage (Match G1).

== Third stage ==
The first legs were played on 8–10 March, and the second legs were played on 15–17 March 2022.

Team 1	Agg.	Team 2	1st leg	2nd leg
Fluminense (Brazil)	3–3 (1–4 p)	(Paraguay) Olimpia	3–1	0–2
Everton (Chile)	0–2	(Argentina) Estudiantes	0–1	0–1
Universidad Católica (Ecuador)	1–2	(Bolivia) The Strongest	0–0	1–2
América Mineiro (Brazil)	0–0 (5–4 p)	(Ecuador) Barcelona	0–0	0–0

=== Match G1 ===
9 March 2022
21:30 UTC−3

Fluminense (Brazil)	3–1	(Paraguay) Olimpia
Cano 11', 68'; Luiz Henrique 47'	Report	D. González 16'

Estádio Olímpico Nilton Santos, Rio de Janeiro
Attendance: 31,799
Referee: Facundo Tello (Argentina)

16 March 2022
21:30 UTC−3

Olimpia (Paraguay)	2–0	(Brazil) Fluminense
Recalde 36'; Paiva 89'	Report
Penalties
Quintana (penalty scored); Camacho (penalty scored); Ortiz (penalty scored); D. González (penalty scored)	4–1	(penalty missed) Willian; (penalty missed) Felipe Melo; (penalty scored) André

Estadio Defensores del Chaco, Asunción
Referee: Roberto Tobar (Chile)

Tied 3–3 on aggregate, Olimpia won on penalties and advanced to the group stage.

=== Match G2 ===
9 March 2022
19:15 UTC−3

Everton (Chile)	0–1	(Argentina) Estudiantes
	Report	Pellegrini 79'

Estadio Sausalito, Viña del Mar
Attendance: 11,105
Referee: Bruno Arleu (Brazil)

16 March 2022
19:15 UTC−3

Estudiantes (Argentina)	1–0	(Chile) Everton
Rogel 33'	Report

Estadio Jorge Luis Hirschi, La Plata
Referee: Jesús Valenzuela (Venezuela)

Estudiantes won 2–0 on aggregate and advanced to the group stage.

=== Match G3 ===
10 March 2022
19:30 UTC−5

Universidad Católica (Ecuador)	0–0	(Bolivia) The Strongest
	Report

Estadio Olímpico Atahualpa, Quito
Attendance: 2,141
Referee: Andrés Matonte (Uruguay)

17 March 2022
20:30 UTC−4

The Strongest (Bolivia)	2–1	(Ecuador) Universidad Católica
Triverio 2'; Amaral 84'	Report	Díaz 7'

Estadio Hernando Siles, La Paz
Attendance: 21,861
Referee: Wilton Sampaio (Brazil)

The Strongest won 2–1 on aggregate and advanced to the group stage.

=== Match G4 ===
8 March 2022
21:30 UTC−3

América Mineiro (Brazil)	0–0	(Ecuador) Barcelona
	Report

Estádio Independência, Belo Horizonte
Attendance: 7,277
Referee: Darío Herrera (Argentina)

15 March 2022
19:30 UTC−5

Barcelona (Ecuador)	0–0	(Brazil) América Mineiro
	Report
Penalties
Piñatares (penalty scored); B. Castillo (penalty scored); Martínez (penalty scored); Quiñónez (penalty missed); Díaz (penalty scored)	4–5	(penalty scored) Wellington Paulista; (penalty scored) Iago Maidana; (penalty scored) Felipe Azevedo; (penalty scored) Ramírez; (penalty scored) Juninho Valoura

Estadio Monumental Isidro Romero Carbo, Guayaquil
Referee: Patricio Loustau (Argentina) (Note: Referee Fernando Rapallini from Argentina, who was originally assigned to the Barcelona v América Mineiro match, was replaced by Patricio Loustau from Argentina.)

Tied 0–0 on aggregate, América Mineiro won on penalties and advanced to the group stage.
