= 2022 Copa Libertadores =

63rd season of Copa Libertadores

Copa CONMEBOL Libertadores 2022
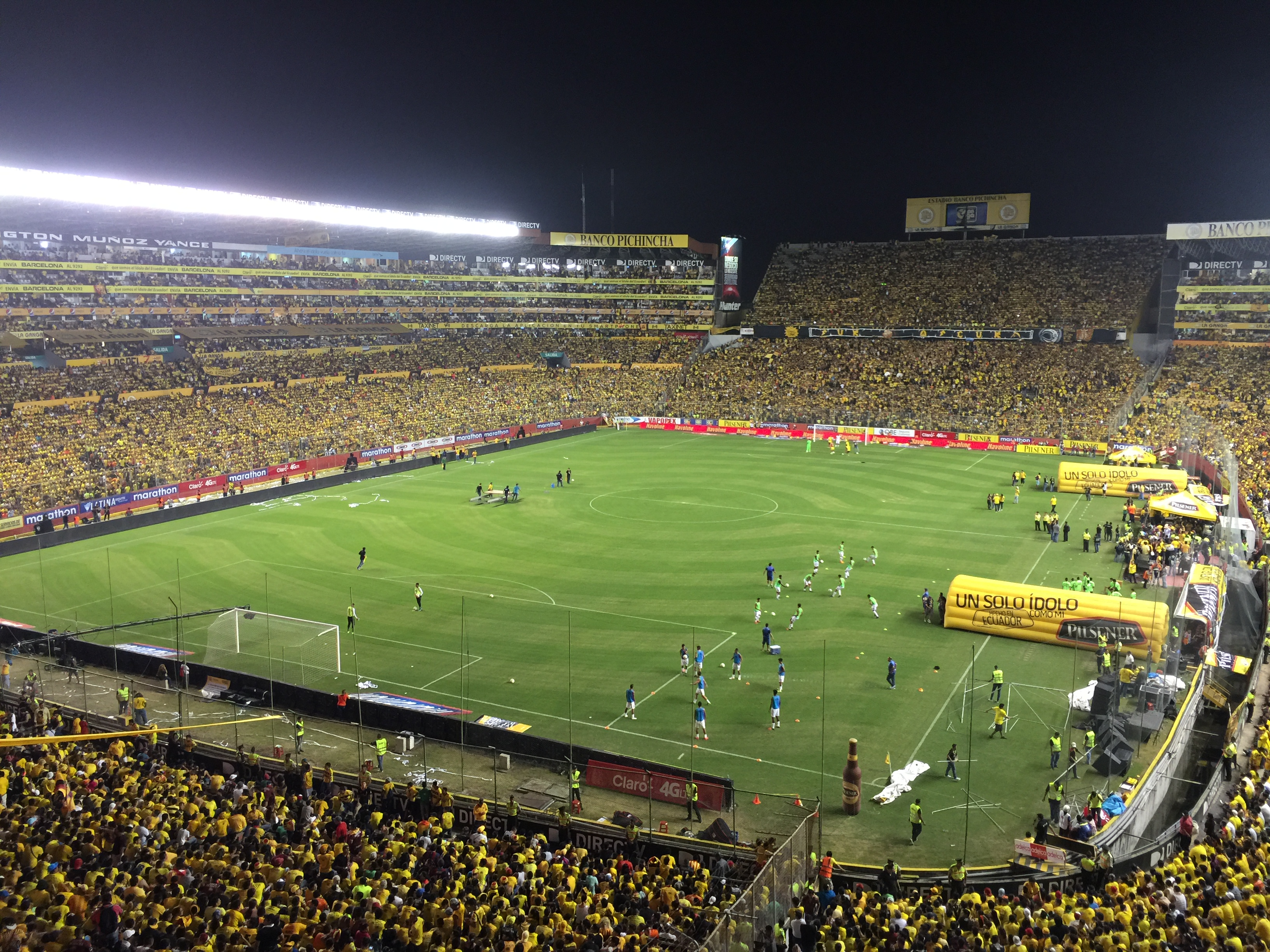
- The Estadio Monumental Isidro Romero Carbo in Guayaquil hosted the final

Tournament details
- Dates: 8 February – 29 October 2022
- Teams: 47 (from 10 associations)

Final positions
- Champions: (Brazil) Flamengo (3rd title)
- Runners-up: (Brazil) Athletico Paranaense

Tournament statistics
- Matches played: 155
- Goals scored: 382 (2.46 per match)
- Top scorer: (Brazil) Pedro (12 goals)
- Best player: (Brazil) Pedro

The 2022 Copa CONMEBOL Libertadores was the 63rd edition of the CONMEBOL Libertadores (also referred to as the Copa Libertadores), South America's premier club football tournament organized by CONMEBOL.

On 14 May 2020, CONMEBOL announced the candidate venues for the 2021, 2022 and 2023 club competition finals. On 13 May 2021, CONMEBOL's Council decided that the final would be played at the Estadio Monumental Isidro Romero Carbo in Guayaquil, Ecuador on 29 October 2022.

On 25 November 2021, CONMEBOL announced the abolition of the away goals rule in all of its club competitions including the Copa Libertadores, which had been used since 2005. Accordingly, if in a two-legged tie two teams scored the same number of aggregate goals, the winner of the tie would not be decided by the number of away goals scored by each team but by a penalty shoot-out.

Brazilian club Flamengo were the champions, winning their third Copa Libertadores title after beating fellow Brazilian side Athletico Paranaense in the final by a 1–0 score. As winners of the 2022 Copa Libertadores, Flamengo earned the right to play against the winners of the 2022 Copa Sudamericana in the 2023 Recopa Sudamericana and also automatically qualified for both the 2022 FIFA Club World Cup and the 2023 Copa Libertadores group stage.

Palmeiras were the defending champions, but were eliminated by Athletico Paranaense in the semi-finals.

== Teams ==
The following 47 teams from the 10 CONMEBOL member associations qualified for the tournament:

- Copa Libertadores champions
- Copa Sudamericana champions
- Brazil: 7 berths
- Argentina: 6 berths
- All other associations: 4 berths each

The entry stage was determined as follows:

- Group stage: 28 teams
  - Copa Libertadores champions
  - Copa Sudamericana champions
  - Teams which qualified for berths 1–5 from Argentina and Brazil
  - Teams which qualified for berths 1–2 from all other associations
- Second stage: 13 teams
  - Teams which qualified for berths 6–7 from Brazil
  - Team which qualified for berth 6 from Argentina
  - Teams which qualified for berths 3–4 from Chile and Colombia
  - Teams which qualified for berth 3 from all other associations
- First stage: 6 teams
  - Teams which qualified for berth 4 from Bolivia, Ecuador, Paraguay, Peru, Uruguay and Venezuela

Association	Team (Berth)	Entry stage	Qualification method
Argentina (6 berths)	Colón (Argentina 1)	Group stage	2021 Copa de la Liga Profesional champions
Argentina (6 berths)	River Plate (Argentina 2)	Group stage	2021 Primera División champions
Argentina (6 berths)	Boca Juniors (Argentina 3)	Group stage	2019–20 Copa Argentina champions
Argentina (6 berths)	Vélez Sarsfield (Argentina 4)	Group stage	2021 Copa de la Liga Profesional and Primera División aggregate table best team not yet qualified
Argentina (6 berths)	Talleres (Argentina 5)	Group stage	2021 Copa de la Liga Profesional and Primera División aggregate table 2nd best team not yet qualified
Argentina (6 berths)	Estudiantes (Argentina 6)	Second stage	2021 Copa de la Liga Profesional and Primera División aggregate table 3rd best team not yet qualified
Bolivia (4 berths)	Independiente Petrolero (Bolivia 1)	Group stage	2021 Primera División champions
Bolivia (4 berths)	Always Ready (Bolivia 2)	Group stage	2021 Primera División runners-up
Bolivia (4 berths)	The Strongest (Bolivia 3)	Second stage	2021 Primera División 3rd place
Bolivia (4 berths)	Bolívar (Bolivia 4)	First stage	2021 Primera División 4th place
Brazil (7 + 2 berths)	Palmeiras (Title holders)	Group stage	2021 Copa Libertadores champions
Brazil (7 + 2 berths)	Athletico Paranaense (Copa Sudamericana)	Group stage	2021 Copa Sudamericana champions
Brazil (7 + 2 berths)	Atlético Mineiro (Brazil 1)	Group stage	2021 Campeonato Brasileiro Série A champions
Brazil (7 + 2 berths)	Flamengo (Brazil 2)	Group stage	2021 Campeonato Brasileiro Série A runners-up
Brazil (7 + 2 berths)	Fortaleza (Brazil 3)	Group stage	2021 Campeonato Brasileiro Série A 4th place
Brazil (7 + 2 berths)	Corinthians (Brazil 4)	Group stage	2021 Campeonato Brasileiro Série A 5th place
Brazil (7 + 2 berths)	Red Bull Bragantino (Brazil 5)	Group stage	2021 Campeonato Brasileiro Série A 6th place
Brazil (7 + 2 berths)	Fluminense (Brazil 6)	Second stage	2021 Campeonato Brasileiro Série A 7th place
Brazil (7 + 2 berths)	América Mineiro (Brazil 7)	Second stage	2021 Campeonato Brasileiro Série A 8th place
Chile (4 berths)	Universidad Católica (Chile 1)	Group stage	2021 Primera División champions
Chile (4 berths)	Colo-Colo (Chile 2)	Group stage	2021 Primera División runners-up
Chile (4 berths)	Audax Italiano (Chile 3)	Second stage	2021 Primera División 3rd place
Chile (4 berths)	Everton (Chile 4)	Second stage	2021 Copa Chile runners-up
Colombia (4 berths)	Deportes Tolima (Colombia 1)	Group stage	2021 Apertura champions
Colombia (4 berths)	Deportivo Cali (Colombia 2)	Group stage	2021 Finalización champions
Colombia (4 berths)	Millonarios (Colombia 3)	Second stage	2021 Primera A aggregate table best team not yet qualified
Colombia (4 berths)	Atlético Nacional (Colombia 4)	Second stage	2021 Copa Colombia champions
Ecuador (4 berths)	Independiente del Valle (Ecuador 1)	Group stage	2021 Serie A champions
Ecuador (4 berths)	Emelec (Ecuador 2)	Group stage	2021 Serie A runners-up
Ecuador (4 berths)	Universidad Católica (Ecuador 3)	Second stage	2021 Serie A aggregate table best team not yet qualified
Ecuador (4 berths)	Barcelona (Ecuador 4)	First stage	2021 Serie A aggregate table 2nd best team not yet qualified
Paraguay (4 berths)	Cerro Porteño (Paraguay 1)	Group stage	2021 Primera División tournament (Apertura or Clausura) champions with better record in aggregate table
Paraguay (4 berths)	Libertad (Paraguay 2)	Group stage	2021 Primera División tournament (Apertura or Clausura) champions with worse record in aggregate table
Paraguay (4 berths)	Guaraní (Paraguay 3)	Second stage	2021 Primera División aggregate table best team not yet qualified
Paraguay (4 berths)	Olimpia (Paraguay 4)	First stage	2021 Primera División aggregate table 2nd best team not yet qualified
Peru (4 berths)	Alianza Lima (Peru 1)	Group stage	2021 Liga 1 champions
Peru (4 berths)	Sporting Cristal (Peru 2)	Group stage	2021 Liga 1 runners-up
Peru (4 berths)	Universitario (Peru 3)	Second stage	2021 Liga 1 aggregate table best team not yet qualified
Peru (4 berths)	Universidad César Vallejo (Peru 4)	First stage	2021 Liga 1 aggregate table 2nd best team not yet qualified
Uruguay (4 berths)	Peñarol (Uruguay 1)	Group stage	2021 Primera División champions
Uruguay (4 berths)	Nacional (Uruguay 2)	Group stage	2021 Primera División runners-up
Uruguay (4 berths)	Plaza Colonia (Uruguay 3)	Second stage	2021 Primera División aggregate table best team not yet qualified
Uruguay (4 berths)	Montevideo City Torque (Uruguay 4)	First stage	2021 Primera División aggregate table 2nd best team not yet qualified
Venezuela (4 berths)	Deportivo Táchira (Venezuela 1)	Group stage	2021 Primera División champions
Venezuela (4 berths)	Caracas (Venezuela 2)	Group stage	2021 Primera División runners-up
Venezuela (4 berths)	Monagas (Venezuela 3)	Second stage	2021 Primera División Fase Final A 3rd place
Venezuela (4 berths)	Deportivo Lara (Venezuela 4)	First stage	2021 Primera División Fase Final A 4th place

== Schedule ==
The schedule of the competition was as follows:

Stage	Draw date	First leg	Second leg
First stage	20 December 2021	8–9 February 2022	15–16 February 2022
Second stage	20 December 2021	22–24 February 2022	1–3 March 2022
Third stage	20 December 2021	8–10 March 2022	15–17 March 2022
Group stage	25 March 2022	Matchday 1: 5–7 April 2022; Matchday 2: 12–14 April 2022; Matchday 3: 26–28 April 2022; Matchday 4: 3–5 May 2022; Matchday 5: 17–19 May 2022; Matchday 6: 24–26 May 2022	
Round of 16	27 May 2022	28–30 June 2022	5–7 July 2022
Quarter-finals	27 May 2022	2–4 August 2022	9–11 August 2022
Semi-finals	27 May 2022	30–31 August 2022	6–7 September 2022
Final	27 May 2022	29 October 2022 at Estadio Monumental Isidro Romero Carbo, Guayaquil	

== Draws ==
Location of teams of the 2022 Copa Libertadores.
Brown: Group A; Red: Group B; Orange: Group C;
Yellow: Group D; Green: Group E; Blue: Group F;
Purple: Group G; Pink: Group H; White: Play-off rounds.

The draw for the qualifying stages was held on 20 December 2021, 12:00 PYST (UTC−3), at the CONMEBOL Convention Centre in Luque, Paraguay.

Teams were seeded by their CONMEBOL Clubs ranking as of 16 December 2021 (shown in parentheses), taking into account the following three factors:

1. Performance in the last 10 years, taking into account Copa Libertadores and Copa Sudamericana results in the period 2012–2021.
2. Historical coefficient, taking into account Copa Libertadores and Copa Sudamericana results in the period 1960–2011 and 2002–2011 respectively.
3. Local tournament champion, with bonus points awarded to domestic league champions of the last 10 years.

For the first stage, the six teams were drawn into three ties (E1–E3), with the teams from Pot 1 hosting the second leg.

First stage draw
Pot 1	Pot 2
(Paraguay) Olimpia (14); (Ecuador) Barcelona (18); (Bolivia) Bolívar (31)	(Venezuela) Deportivo Lara (75); (Uruguay) Montevideo City Torque (99); (Peru) Universidad César Vallejo (141)

For the second stage, the 16 teams were drawn into eight ties (C1–C8), with the teams from Pot 1 hosting the second leg. Teams from the same association cannot be drawn into the same tie, excluding the three winners of the first stage, which will be seeded in Pot 2 and whose identity will not be known at the time of the draw, and may be drawn into the same tie with another team from the same association.

Second stage draw
Pot 1	Pot 2
(Colombia) Atlético Nacional (9); (Brazil) Fluminense (30); (Argentina) Estudiantes (34); (Paraguay) Guaraní (38); (Bolivia) The Strongest (40); (Peru) Universitario (43); (Ecuador) Universidad Católica (120); (Venezuela) Monagas (133)	(Chile) Audax Italiano (152); (Chile) Everton (165); (Uruguay) Plaza Colonia (205); (Brazil) América Mineiro (No rank); (Colombia) Millonarios (52); First stage winner E1; First stage winner E2; First stage winner E3

Notes

1. ^{COL} The identity of the team Colombia 3 was not known at the time of the draw, and was seeded in Pot 2.

For the third stage, the eight winners of the second stage were allocated without any draw into the following four ties (G1–G4), with the team in each tie with the higher CONMEBOL ranking hosting the second leg.

- Second stage winner C1 vs. Second stage winner C8
- Second stage winner C2 vs. Second stage winner C7
- Second stage winner C3 vs. Second stage winner C6
- Second stage winner C4 vs. Second stage winner C5

The draw for the group stage was held on 25 March 2022, 12:00 PYST (UTC−3), at the CONMEBOL Convention Centre in Luque, Paraguay. For the group stage, the 32 teams were drawn into eight groups (Groups A–H) of four containing a team from each of the four pots. The defending champions Palmeiras were directly assigned as the top seed of Group A (position A1). The remaining teams were distributed into four pots according to their CONMEBOL Clubs ranking. Teams from the same association could not be drawn into the same group, excluding the four winners of the third stage, which were allocated to Pot 4 and could be drawn into the same group with another team from the same association.

Group stage draw
Pot 1	Pot 2	Pot 3	Pot 4
(Brazil) Palmeiras (2); (Argentina) River Plate (1); (Argentina) Boca Juniors (3); (Brazil) Flamengo (4); (Uruguay) Nacional (6); (Uruguay) Peñarol (7); (Brazil) Atlético Mineiro (11); (Brazil) Athletico Paranaense (12)	(Paraguay) Cerro Porteño (15); (Paraguay) Libertad (16); (Ecuador) Independiente del Valle (21); (Chile) Universidad Católica (26); (Ecuador) Emelec (28); (Brazil) Corinthians (29); (Chile) Colo-Colo (32); (Argentina) Vélez Sarsfield (33)	(Peru) Sporting Cristal (35); (Colombia) Deportivo Cali (44); (Brazil) Red Bull Bragantino (45); (Venezuela) Deportivo Táchira (46); (Peru) Alianza Lima (54); (Colombia) Deportes Tolima (60); (Argentina) Colón (64); (Venezuela) Caracas (67)	(Bolivia) Always Ready (86); (Argentina) Talleres (105); (Bolivia) Independiente Petrolero (178); (Brazil) Fortaleza (229); (Paraguay) Olimpia (14); (Argentina) Estudiantes (34); (Bolivia) The Strongest (40); (Brazil) América Mineiro (No rank)

Notes

1. ^{TH} The defending Copa Libertadores champions, Palmeiras, were automatically allocated to Group A and the position A1.
2. ^{CS} The defending Copa Sudamericana champions (normally seeded in Pot 2) were seeded in Pot 1 due to their CONMEBOL Clubs rank.
3. ^{Q3} The third stage winners were seeded in Pot 4.

The draw for the round of 16 was held on 27 May 2022, 12:00 PYT (UTC−4) at the CONMEBOL Convention Center in Luque, Paraguay. For the round of 16, the 16 teams were drawn into eight ties (A–H) between a group winner (Pot 1) and a group runner-up (Pot 2), with the group winners hosting the second leg. Teams from the same association or the same group could be drawn into the same tie (Regulations Article 2.2.3.2).

== Qualifying stages ==
In the qualifying stages, each tie was played on a home-and-away two-legged basis. If tied on aggregate, extra time was not played, and a penalty shoot-out was used to determine the winner (Regulations Article 2.4.3). The qualifying stages were structured as follows:

- First stage (6 teams): The three winners of the first stage advanced to the second stage to join the 13 teams which were given byes to the second stage.
- Second stage (16 teams): The eight winners of the second stage advanced to the third stage.
- Third stage (8 teams): The four winners of the third stage advanced to the group stage to join the 28 direct entrants. The four teams eliminated in the third stage entered the Copa Sudamericana group stage.

=== First stage ===
Team 1	Agg.	Team 2	1st leg	2nd leg
Montevideo City Torque (Uruguay)	1–1 (7–8 p)	(Ecuador) Barcelona	1–1	0–0
Deportivo Lara (Venezuela)	2–7	(Bolivia) Bolívar	2–3	0–4
Universidad César Vallejo (Peru)	0–3	(Paraguay) Olimpia	0–1	0–2

=== Second stage ===
Team 1	Agg.	Team 2	1st leg	2nd leg
Millonarios (Colombia)	1–4	(Brazil) Fluminense	1–2	0–2
Audax Italiano (Chile)	1–2	(Argentina) Estudiantes	1–0	0–2
Bolívar (Bolivia)	1–3	(Ecuador) Universidad Católica	1–1	0–2
América Mineiro (Brazil)	3–3 (5–4 p)	(Paraguay) Guaraní	0–1	3–2
Barcelona (Ecuador)	3–0	(Peru) Universitario	2–0	1–0
Plaza Colonia (Uruguay)	2–3	(Bolivia) The Strongest	2–0	0–3
Everton (Chile)	3–1	(Venezuela) Monagas	3–0	0–1
Olimpia (Paraguay)	4–2	(Colombia) Atlético Nacional	3–1	1–1

=== Third stage ===
Team 1	Agg.	Team 2	1st leg	2nd leg
Fluminense (Brazil)	3–3 (1–4 p)	(Paraguay) Olimpia	3–1	0–2
Everton (Chile)	0–2	(Argentina) Estudiantes	0–1	0–1
Universidad Católica (Ecuador)	1–2	(Bolivia) The Strongest	0–0	1–2
América Mineiro (Brazil)	0–0 (5–4 p)	(Ecuador) Barcelona	0–0	0–0

== Group stage ==
In the group stage, each group is played on a home-and-away round-robin basis. The teams are ranked according to the following criteria: 1. Points (3 points for a win, 1 point for a draw, and 0 points for a loss); 2. Goal difference; 3. Goals scored; 4. Away goals scored; 5. CONMEBOL ranking (Regulations Article 2.4.2).

The winners and runners-up of each group advanced to the round of 16 of the final stages. The third-placed teams of each group entered the round of 16 of the 2022 Copa Sudamericana.

=== Group A ===
Pos	Team	Pld	W	D	L	GF	GA	GD	Pts	Qualification	PAL	EME	TAC	CIP
1	(Brazil) Palmeiras	6	6	0	0	25	3	+22	18	Round of 16	—	1–0	4–1	8–1
2	(Ecuador) Emelec	6	2	2	2	14	7	+7	8	Round of 16	1–3	—	1–1	7–0
3	(Venezuela) Deportivo Táchira	6	2	1	3	8	14	−6	7	Copa Sudamericana	0–4	1–4	—	3–0
4	(Bolivia) Independiente Petrolero	6	0	1	5	3	26	−23	1		0–5	1–1	1–2	—

Source: CONMEBOL

=== Group B ===
Pos	Team	Pld	W	D	L	GF	GA	GD	Pts	Qualification	LIB	CAP	STR	CAR
1	(Paraguay) Libertad	6	3	1	2	8	6	+2	10	Round of 16	—	1–0	4–1	2–1
2	(Brazil) Athletico Paranaense	6	3	1	2	8	7	+1	10	Round of 16	2–0	—	1–0	5–1
3	(Bolivia) The Strongest	6	1	3	2	8	7	+1	6	Copa Sudamericana	1–1	5–0	—	1–1
4	(Venezuela) Caracas	6	1	3	2	4	8	−4	6		1–0	0–0	0–0	—

Source: CONMEBOL

=== Group C ===
Pos	Team	Pld	W	D	L	GF	GA	GD	Pts	Qualification	EST	VEL	NAC	RBB
1	(Argentina) Estudiantes	6	4	1	1	8	5	+3	13	Round of 16	—	4–1	1–0	2–0
2	(Argentina) Vélez Sarsfield	6	2	2	2	12	11	+1	8	Round of 16	4–0	—	1–2	2–2
3	(Uruguay) Nacional	6	2	1	3	7	7	0	7	Copa Sudamericana	0–0	2–3	—	3–0
4	(Brazil) Red Bull Bragantino	6	1	2	3	5	9	−4	5		0–1	1–1	2–0	—

Source: CONMEBOL

=== Group D ===
Pos	Team	Pld	W	D	L	GF	GA	GD	Pts	Qualification	CAM	TOL	IDV	AMG
1	(Brazil) Atlético Mineiro	6	3	2	1	10	6	+4	11	Round of 16	—	1–2	3–1	1–1
2	(Colombia) Deportes Tolima	6	3	2	1	10	9	+1	11	Round of 16	0–2	—	1–0	2–2
3	(Ecuador) Independiente del Valle	6	2	2	2	9	7	+2	8	Copa Sudamericana	1–1	2–2	—	3–0
4	(Brazil) América Mineiro	6	0	2	4	6	13	−7	2		1–2	2–3	0–2	—

Source: CONMEBOL

=== Group E ===
Pos	Team	Pld	W	D	L	GF	GA	GD	Pts	Qualification	BOC	COR	CAL	CAR
1	(Argentina) Boca Juniors	6	3	1	2	5	5	0	10	Round of 16	—	1–1	1–0	2–0
2	(Brazil) Corinthians	6	2	3	1	5	4	+1	9	Round of 16	2–0	—	1–0	1–1
3	(Colombia) Deportivo Cali	6	2	2	2	7	4	+3	8	Copa Sudamericana	2–0	0–0	—	3–0
4	(Bolivia) Always Ready	6	1	2	3	5	9	−4	5		0–1	2–0	2–2	—

Source: CONMEBOL

=== Group F ===
Pos	Team	Pld	W	D	L	GF	GA	GD	Pts	Qualification	RIV	FOR	CCL	ALI
1	(Argentina) River Plate	6	5	1	0	18	3	+15	16	Round of 16	—	2–0	4–0	8–1
2	(Brazil) Fortaleza	6	3	1	2	10	9	+1	10	Round of 16	1–1	—	1–2	2–1
3	(Chile) Colo-Colo	6	2	1	3	9	13	−4	7	Copa Sudamericana	1–2	3–4	—	2–1
4	(Peru) Alianza Lima	6	0	1	5	4	16	−12	1		0–1	0–2	1–1	—

Source: CONMEBOL

=== Group G ===
Pos	Team	Pld	W	D	L	GF	GA	GD	Pts	Qualification	COL	CCP	OLI	PEÑ
1	(Argentina) Colón	6	3	1	2	8	8	0	10	Round of 16	—	2–1	2–1	2–1
2	(Paraguay) Cerro Porteño	6	2	2	2	5	4	+1	8	Round of 16	3–1	—	0–1	1–0
3	(Paraguay) Olimpia	6	2	2	2	4	4	0	8	Copa Sudamericana	0–0	0–0	—	1–0
4	(Uruguay) Peñarol	6	2	1	3	5	6	−1	7		2–1	0–0	2–1	—

Source: CONMEBOL

=== Group H ===
Pos	Team	Pld	W	D	L	GF	GA	GD	Pts	Qualification	FLA	TAL	UCA	CRI
1	(Brazil) Flamengo	6	5	1	0	15	6	+9	16	Round of 16	—	3–1	3–0	2–1
2	(Argentina) Talleres	6	3	2	1	6	5	+1	11	Round of 16	2–2	—	1–0	1–0
3	(Chile) Universidad Católica	6	1	1	4	5	10	−5	4	Copa Sudamericana	2–3	0–1	—	2–1
4	(Peru) Sporting Cristal	6	0	2	4	3	8	−5	2		0–2	0–0	1–1	—

Source: CONMEBOL

== Final stages ==
Starting from the round of 16, the teams played a single-elimination tournament with the following rules:

- In the round of 16, quarter-finals and semi-finals, each tie was played on a home-and-away two-legged basis, with the higher-seeded team hosting the second leg (Regulations Article 2.2.3.2). If tied on aggregate, extra time was not played, and a penalty shoot-out was used to determine the winners (Regulations Article 2.4.3).
- The final was played as a single match at a venue pre-selected by CONMEBOL, with the higher-seeded team designated as the "home" team for administrative purposes (Regulations Article 2.2.3.5). If tied after regulation, 30 minutes of extra time would be played. If still tied after extra time, a penalty shoot-out would be used to determine the winners (Regulations Article 2.4.4).

=== Qualified teams ===
The winners and runners-up of each of the eight groups in the group stage advanced to the round of 16.

Group	Winners	Runners-up
A	(Brazilian Football Confederation) Palmeiras	(Ecuadorian Football Federation) Emelec
B	(Paraguayan Football Association) Libertad	(Brazilian Football Confederation) Athletico Paranaense
C	(Argentine Football Association) Estudiantes	(Argentine Football Association) Vélez Sarsfield
D	(Brazilian Football Confederation) Atlético Mineiro	(Colombian Football Federation) Deportes Tolima
E	(Argentine Football Association) Boca Juniors	(Brazilian Football Confederation) Corinthians
F	(Argentine Football Association) River Plate	(Brazilian Football Confederation) Fortaleza
G	(Argentine Football Association) Colón	(Paraguayan Football Association) Cerro Porteño
H	(Brazilian Football Confederation) Flamengo	(Argentine Football Association) Talleres

=== Seeding ===
Starting from the round of 16, the teams were seeded according to their results in the group stage, with the group winners (Pot 1) seeded 1–8, and the group runners-up (Pot 2) seeded 9–16.

Seed	Grp	Team	Pld	W	D	L	GF	GA	GD	Pts	Round of 16 draw
1	A	(Brazilian Football Confederation) Palmeiras	6	6	0	0	25	3	+22	18	Pot 1
2	F	(Argentine Football Association) River Plate	6	5	1	0	18	3	+15	16	Pot 1
3	H	(Brazilian Football Confederation) Flamengo	6	5	1	0	15	6	+9	16	Pot 1
4	C	(Argentine Football Association) Estudiantes	6	4	1	1	8	5	+3	13	Pot 1
5	D	(Brazilian Football Confederation) Atlético Mineiro	6	3	2	1	10	6	+4	11	Pot 1
6	B	(Paraguayan Football Association) Libertad	6	3	1	2	8	6	+2	10	Pot 1
7	G	(Argentine Football Association) Colón	6	3	1	2	8	8	0	10	Pot 1
8	E	(Argentine Football Association) Boca Juniors	6	3	1	2	5	5	0	10	Pot 1
9	D	(Colombian Football Federation) Deportes Tolima	6	3	2	1	10	9	+1	11	Pot 2
10	H	(Argentine Football Association) Talleres	6	3	2	1	6	5	+1	11	Pot 2
11	F	(Brazilian Football Confederation) Fortaleza	6	3	1	2	10	9	+1	10	Pot 2
12	B	(Brazilian Football Confederation) Athletico Paranaense	6	3	1	2	8	7	+1	10	Pot 2
13	E	(Brazilian Football Confederation) Corinthians	6	2	3	1	5	4	+1	9	Pot 2
14	A	(Ecuadorian Football Federation) Emelec	6	2	2	2	14	7	+7	8	Pot 2
15	C	(Argentine Football Association) Vélez Sarsfield	6	2	2	2	12	11	+1	8	Pot 2
16	G	(Paraguayan Football Association) Cerro Porteño	6	2	2	2	5	4	+1	8	Pot 2

Source: CONMEBOL
Rules for classification: 1) Higher position in group; 2) Points; 3) Goal difference; 4) Goals scored; 5) Away goals scored; 6) CONMEBOL ranking (Regulations Article 2.4.2).

=== Bracket ===
The bracket was decided based on the round of 16 draw, which was held on 27 May 2022.

Round of 16
15	(Argentine Football Association) Vélez Sarsfield	1	0	1
2	(Argentine Football Association) River Plate	0	0	0
10	(Argentine Football Association) Talleres	1	2	3
7	(Argentine Football Association) Colón	1	0	1
13	(Brazilian Football Confederation) Corinthians (p)	0	0	0 (6)
8	(Argentine Football Association) Boca Juniors	0	0	0 (5)
9	(Colombian Football Federation) Deportes Tolima	0	1	1
3	(Brazilian Football Confederation) Flamengo	1	7	8
12	(Brazilian Football Confederation) Athletico Paranaense	2	1	3
6	(Paraguayan Football Association) Libertad	1	1	2
11	(Brazilian Football Confederation) Fortaleza	1	0	1
4	(Argentine Football Association) Estudiantes	1	3	4
14	(Ecuadorian Football Federation) Emelec	1	0	1
5	(Brazilian Football Confederation) Atlético Mineiro	1	1	2
16	(Paraguayan Football Association) Cerro Porteño	0	0	0
1	(Brazilian Football Confederation) Palmeiras	3	5	8

Quarter-finals
15	(Argentine Football Association) Vélez Sarsfield	3	1	4
10	(Argentine Football Association) Talleres	2	0	2
13	(Brazilian Football Confederation) Corinthians	0	0	0
3	(Brazilian Football Confederation) Flamengo	2	1	3
12	(Brazilian Football Confederation) Athletico Paranaense	0	1	1
4	(Argentine Football Association) Estudiantes	0	0	0
5	(Brazilian Football Confederation) Atlético Mineiro	2	0	2 (5)
1	(Brazilian Football Confederation) Palmeiras (p)	2	0	2 (6)

Semi-finals
15	(Argentine Football Association) Vélez Sarsfield	0	1	1
3	(Brazilian Football Confederation) Flamengo	4	2	6
12	(Brazilian Football Confederation) Athletico Paranaense	1	2	3
1	(Brazilian Football Confederation) Palmeiras	0	2	2

Final
29 October – Guayaquil
3	(Brazilian Football Confederation) Flamengo	1
12	(Brazilian Football Confederation) Athletico Paranaense	0

=== Round of 16 ===
Team 1	Agg.	Team 2	1st leg	2nd leg
Athletico Paranaense (Brazil)	3–2	(Paraguay) Libertad	2–1	1–1
Deportes Tolima (Colombia)	1–8	(Brazil) Flamengo	0–1	1–7
Vélez Sarsfield (Argentina)	1–0	(Argentina) River Plate	1–0	0–0
Emelec (Ecuador)	1–2	(Brazil) Atlético Mineiro	1–1	0–1
Cerro Porteño (Paraguay)	0–8	(Brazil) Palmeiras	0–3	0–5
Talleres (Argentina)	3–1	(Argentina) Colón	1–1	2–0
Corinthians (Brazil)	0–0 (6–5 p)	(Argentina) Boca Juniors	0–0	0–0
Fortaleza (Brazil)	1–4	(Argentina) Estudiantes	1–1	0–3

=== Quarter-finals ===
Team 1	Agg.	Team 2	1st leg	2nd leg
Athletico Paranaense (Brazil)	1–0	(Argentina) Estudiantes	0–0	1–0
Corinthians (Brazil)	0–3	(Brazil) Flamengo	0–2	0–1
Vélez Sarsfield (Argentina)	4–2	(Argentina) Talleres	3–2	1–0
Atlético Mineiro (Brazil)	2–2 (5–6 p)	(Brazil) Palmeiras	2–2	0–0

=== Semi-finals ===
Team 1	Agg.	Team 2	1st leg	2nd leg
Athletico Paranaense (Brazil)	3–2	(Brazil) Palmeiras	1–0	2–2
Vélez Sarsfield (Argentina)	1–6	(Brazil) Flamengo	0–4	1–2

=== Final ===
29 October 2022
15:00 UTC−5

Flamengo (Brazil)	1–0	(Brazil) Athletico Paranaense
Gabriel Barbosa 45+4'	Report

Estadio Monumental Isidro Romero Carbo, Guayaquil
Attendance: 42,517
Referee: Patricio Loustau (Argentina)

== Statistics ==
=== Top scorers ===
Rank	Player	Team	1Q1	1Q2	2Q1	2Q2	3Q1	3Q2	GS1	GS2	GS3	GS4	GS5	GS6	⅛F1	⅛F2	QF1	QF2	SF1	SF2	F	Total
1	(Brazil) Pedro	(Brazil) Flamengo										1	1	1		4		1	3	1		12
2	(Argentina) Lucas Janson	(Argentina) Vélez Sarsfield							1				1	2	1		2					7
2	(Brazil) Rafael Navarro	(Brazil) Palmeiras							2	4		1										7
2	(Brazil) Rony	(Brazil) Palmeiras								1	1			1	2	2						7
5	(Argentina) Julián Álvarez	(Argentina) River Plate												6								6
5	(Brazil) Gabriel Barbosa	(Brazil) Flamengo								1	2					1	1				1	6
5	(Uruguay) Sebastián Rodríguez	(Ecuador) Emelec										3		2	1							6
5	(Brazil) Raphael Veiga	(Brazil) Palmeiras							1	2		3										6
9	(Brazil) Hulk	(Brazil) Atlético Mineiro									1		2			1	1					5
9	(Ecuador) Junior Sornoza	(Ecuador) Independiente del Valle							1	2	1			1								5

Source: CONMEBOL

=== Team of the tournament ===
The CONMEBOL technical study group selected the following 11 players as the team of the tournament.

Position	Player	Team
Goalkeeper	(Brazil) Santos	(Brazil) Flamengo
Defenders	(Brazil) Thiago Heleno	(Brazil) Athletico Paranaense
Defenders	(Brazil) David Luiz	(Brazil) Flamengo
Defenders	(Paraguay) Gustavo Gómez	(Brazil) Palmeiras
Midfielders	(Brazil) Éverton Ribeiro	(Brazil) Flamengo
Midfielders	(Brazil) Gustavo Scarpa	(Brazil) Palmeiras
Midfielders	(Uruguay) Giorgian de Arrascaeta	(Brazil) Flamengo
Midfielders	(Argentina) Lucas Janson	(Argentina) Vélez Sarsfield
Forwards	(Brazil) Gabriel Barbosa	(Brazil) Flamengo
Forwards	(Brazil) Pedro	(Brazil) Flamengo
Forwards	(Brazil) Vitor Roque	(Brazil) Athletico Paranaense
Manager	(Brazil) Dorival Junior	(Brazil) Flamengo

== See also ==
- 2022 Copa Sudamericana
