= Willian Vargas =

Ecuadorian footballer (born 1997)

Personal information
- Full name: Willian Andrés Vargas León
- Date of birth: 12 June 1997 (age 29)
- Place of birth: Guayaquil, Ecuador
- Height: 1.73 m (5 ft 8 in)
- Position: Defender

Team information
- Current team: Barcelona SC
- Number: 27

Youth career
- 2012–2015: Toreros FC
- 2016–2017: Boca Juniors

Senior career*
Years	Team	Apps	(Gls)
2018–2024	Guayaquil City	119	(3)
2022	→ Independiente del Valle (loan)	19	(0)
2024–	Barcelona SC	13	(0)
2024	→ Mazatlán (loan)	4	(0)

International career^{‡}
2016–2017	Ecuador U20	3	(0)
- * Club domestic league appearances and goals as of 11 May 2025 ‡ National team caps and goals as of 18 October 2024

Willian Andrés Vargas León (born 12 June 1997) is an Ecuadorian professional footballer who plays as a defender for Barcelona SC.

== Club career ==
=== Early career ===
Vargas began his career at Toreros FC, the affiliate of Barcelona SC. He later moved to Argentina to join the youth team of Boca Juniors.

=== Guayaquil City ===
He returned to Ecuador in 2018 to join Guayaquil City, making his debut in continental competition in the Copa Sudamericana in 2021.

=== Independiente del Valle (loan) ===
In 2022, Vargas joined Independiente del Valle on loan and was part of the team that won the Copa Ecuador and the Copa Sudamericana that year.

=== Barcelona SC ===
On 11 January 2024, Vargas joined Barcelona SC.

=== Mazatlán ===
On 28 July 2024, Vargas moved to Mexico to join Liga MX side Mazatlán on loan.

== International career ==
=== Youth ===
Vargas has represented Ecuador at under-20 level.

He played his first match in a friendly against Chile on 9 November 2016, but was substituted in the 15th minute with his team going on to lose 1–0. The same sides faced again on 11 November with Vargas playing the whole game as Ecuador lost 2–0.

Vargas was called up to the Ecuador squad for the 2017 South American U-20 Championship on home soil. In the tournament he only played once, being sent off for a second yellow card in the 46th minute in the 1–0 loss against Brazil. He did not feature again as Ecuador eventually ended as runners-up, losing the final 2–1 to Uruguay.

== Career statistics ==
=== Club ===
As of 6 November 2024.

Club	Season	League		Cup		Continental		Total	
Club	Season	Apps	Goals	Apps	Goals	Apps	Goals	Apps	Goals
Toreros FC	2014	4	0	—		—		4	0
Toreros FC	2015	9	0	—		—		9	0
Toreros FC	Total	13	0	0	0	0	0	13	0
Boca Juniors	2016	0	0	0	0	0	0	0	0
Boca Juniors	2017	0	0	0	0	0	0	0	0
Boca Juniors	Total	0	0	0	0	0	0	0	0
Guayaquil City	2018	39	1	—		—		39	1
Guayaquil City	2019	0	0	2	0	—		2	0
Guayaquil City	2020	21	0	—		—		21	0
Guayaquil City	2021	30	1	—		1	0	31	1
Independiente del Valle	2022	19	0	6	0	6	1	31	1
Guayaquil City	2023	29	1	0	0	—		29	1
Guayaquil City	Total	119	3	2	0	1	0	122	3
Barcelona SC	2024	8	0	0	0	3	0	11	0
Mazatlán	2024-25	4	0	—		3	0	7	0
Career total		163	3	8	0	13	1	184	4

== Honours ==
Independiente del Valle

- Copa Sudamericana: 2022
- Copa Ecuador: 2022
