= Fernando Cardozo (footballer, born 2001) =

Paraguayan footballer

Personal information
- Full name: Fernando David Cardozo Paniagua
- Date of birth: 8 February 2001 (age 25)
- Place of birth: Asunción, Paraguay
- Height: 1.70 m (5 ft 7 in)
- Position: Right midfielder

Team information
- Current team: Olimpia (on loan from Newell's Old Boys)
- Number: 17

Youth career
- Olimpia

Senior career*
Years	Team	Apps	(Gls)
2017–2024	Olimpia	127	(13)
2019–2020	→ Boavista (loan)	10	(0)
2020–2021	→ Vizela (loan)	20	(0)
2024–	Newell's Old Boys	26	(0)
2025–	→ Olimpia (loan)	2	(0)

International career
2017	Paraguay U17	9	(1)
2019	Paraguay U20	4	(0)
- * Club domestic league appearances and goals as of 13 August 2025

Fernando David Cardozo Paniagua (born 8 February 2001) is a Paraguayan professional footballer who plays as right midfielder for Olimpia, on loan from Newell's Old Boys.

== Career ==
Born in Asunción, Cardozo began his career at Olimpia. He made his professional debut on 23 April 2017 in a 2–1 home win over Sportivo Luqueño in the Paraguayan Primera División, but was substituted for Richard Ortiz after 28 minutes. He scored three goals from 30 games in the 2018 season, starting on 14 April in a 4–2 win over Independiente F.B.C. again at the Estadio Manuel Ferreira.

On 30 June 2019, Cardozo moved to Portuguese Primeira Liga club Boavista on a one-year loan with a buying option, arriving days after compatriot Walter Clar. He did not debut until the next 6 June, as a 65th-minute substitute for Heriberto Tavares in a 1–0 home loss to Moreirense.
