= Lucas Janson =

Argentine footballer (born 1994)

Personal information
- Full name: Lucas Ezequiel Janson
- Date of birth: 16 August 1994 (age 32)
- Place of birth: Olavarría, Argentina
- Height: 1.71 m (5 ft 7 in)
- Position: Left winger

Team information
- Current team: Gimnasia LP (on loan from Boca Juniors)
- Number: 17

Youth career
- –2012: Tigre

Senior career*
| Years | Team | Apps | (Gls) |
| 2012–2019 | Tigre | 92 | (15) |
| 2018 | → Toronto FC (loan) | 11 | (4) |
| 2019–2023 | Vélez Sarsfield | 127 | (27) |
| 2023– | Boca Juniors | 37 | (2) |
| 2026– | → Gimnasia LP (loan) | 0 | (0) |
- * Club domestic league appearances and goals as of 16:28, 30 July 2026 (UTC)

Lucas Ezequiel Janson (born 16 August 1994) is an Argentine professional footballer who plays as a left winger for Gimnasia LP, on loan from Boca Juniors.

== Career ==
=== Tigre ===
==== Toronto FC loan ====
On 8 August 2018 Janson joined Toronto FC on loan for the remainder of the 2018 Major League Soccer season from Tigre of the Argentine Primera División.

== Career statistics ==
As of match played 23 August 2022.

Appearances and goals by club, season and competition
| Club | Season | League | | | National Cup | | League Cup | | Continental | | Total | |
| Club | Season | Division | Apps | Goals | Apps | Goals | Apps | Goals | Apps | Goals | Apps | Goals |
|---|---|---|---|---|---|---|---|---|---|---|---|---|
| Tigre | 2012–13 | Primera Divisíon | 15 | 1 | 1 | 0 | — | | — | | 16 | 1 |
| Tigre | 2013–14 | Primera Divisíon | 8 | 0 | 1 | 0 | — | | 3 (Note: Appearance(s) in Copa Sudamericana.) | 0 | 12 | 0 |
| Tigre | 2014 | Primera Divisíon | 2 | 0 | 0 | 0 | — | | — | | 2 | 0 |
| Tigre | 2015 | Primera Divisíon | 9 | 0 | 0 | 0 | — | | — | | 9 | 0 |
| Tigre | 2016 | Primera Divisíon | 14 | 6 | 1 | 0 | — | | — | | 15 | 6 |
| Tigre | 2016–17 | Primera Divisíon | 10 | 0 | — | | — | | — | | 10 | 0 |
| Tigre | 2017–18 | Primera Divisíon | 24 | 3 | 1 | 0 | — | | — | | 25 | 3 |
| Tigre | 2018–19 | Primera Divisíon | 10 | 5 | — | | 8 | 2 | — | | 18 | 7 |
| Tigre | Total | | 92 | 15 | 4 | 0 | 8 | 2 | 3 | 0 | 107 | 17 |
| Toronto FC (loan) | 2018 | MLS | 11 | 4 | 0 (Note: Appearance(s) in Canadian Championship.) | 0 | — | | 1 (Note: Appearance(s) in Campeones Cup.) | 1 | 12 | 5 |
| Vélez Sarsfield | 2019–20 | Primera Divisíon | 20 | 4 | 2 | 1 | 1 | 0 | 2 | 0 | 25 | 5 |
| Vélez Sarsfield | 2020–21 | Primera Divisíon | 12 | 3 | — | | — | | 6 | 3 | 18 | 6 |
| Vélez Sarsfield | 2021 | Primera Divisíon | 36 | 5 | — | | — | | 8 (Note: Appearance(s) in Copa Libertadores.) | 3 | 44 | 8 |
| Vélez Sarsfield | 2022 | Primera Divisíon | 27 | 8 | 2 | 0 | — | | 10 | 7 | 39 | 15 |
| Vélez Sarsfield | Total | | 95 | 20 | 4 | 1 | 1 | 0 | 26 | 13 | 126 | 34 |
| Career total | | | 198 | 39 | 8 | 1 | 9 | 2 | 30 | 14 | 245 | 56 |

== Honours ==
Boca Juniors

- Argentine Primera División: 2026 Liga

Individual

- Copa Libertadores Team of the Tournament: 2022
