= Sebastián Rodríguez (footballer) =

Uruguayan footballer (born 1992)

Personal information
- Full name: Sebastián Javier Rodríguez Iriarte
- Date of birth: 16 August 1992 (age 34)
- Place of birth: Canelones, Uruguay
- Height: 1.79 m (5 ft 10 in)
- Position: Midfielder

Team information
- Current team: Danubio

Youth career
- Danubio

Senior career*
Years	Team	Apps	(Gls)
2010–2011	Danubio	9	(0)
2011–2014	Almería B	72	(4)
2014	Vllaznia	0	(0)
2014–2015	Locarno	11	(1)
2015–2016	Liverpool Montevideo	26	(2)
2016–2018	Nacional	64	(5)
2018–2020	Veracruz	28	(0)
2020–2022	Emelec	77	(25)
2023	Peñarol	37	(7)
2024	Alianza Lima	33	(2)
2025	Montevideo City Torque	21	(5)
2025	Universidad de Chile	6	(0)
2026–	Danubio	0	(0)

International career
2007	Uruguay U15		
2009	Uruguay U17	5	(0)
- * Club domestic league appearances and goals as of 15 January 2026

Sebastián Javier Rodríguez Iriarte (born 16 August 1992) is a Uruguayan professional footballer who plays as a midfielder for Danubio.

== Club career ==
Born in Canelones, Rodríguez began playing youth football with Danubio, and made his professional debut with the first team on 4 December 2010, starting in a 4–2 home win over Central Español. He finished the season with nine appearances (six starts, 551 minutes of action).

On 27 July 2011 Rodríguez was transferred to Spanish club UD Almería, being initially assigned to the reserves in Segunda División B. Five days later, he was called up for pre-season with the first team squad. He still continued to appear regularly for the B's, however.

On 9 August 2012 Rodríguez reverted to his old name (in his first season abroad he was called Iriarte). He appeared in 12 matches in 2013–14.

On 23 August 2014 Rodríguez joined KF Vllaznia Shkodër, along with compatriot Sebastián Sosa. On 25 September he switched teams and countries again, joining FC Locarno in Switzerland.

On 31 July 2025, Rodríguez signed with Universidad de Chile. He ended his contract on 15 January 2026.

Back to Uruguay, Rodríguez joined Danubio in January 2026.

== International career ==
Rodríguez played for national team in 2009 U-17 World Cup, with the 8 jersey.
