= Andrés Matonte =

Uruguayan professional football referee

- Full name: Andrés Matías Matonte Cabrera
- Born: 30 March 1988 (age 38); Montevideo, Uruguay

Domestic
Years	League	Role
2017–	Uruguayan Primera División	Referee

International
Years	League	Role
2019–	FIFA	Referee

Andrés Matías Matonte Cabrera (born 30 March 1988) is a Uruguayan professional football referee. On 19 May 2022 FIFA announced the 2022 FIFA World Cup's referee list, where Matonte was chosen.

== Career ==
Matonte is a physical education teacher. He started his career as a referee in 2008. He made his debut in the Uruguayan Primera División in the match between Fénix and River Plate (0-0) in 2017.

He is a FIFA referee since 2019 and was part of the referee list of the 2021 FIFA Arab Cup, where he officiated the match between United Arab Emirates and Qatar, and 2022 FIFA World Cup qualification (CONMEBOL).
