= Jesús Valenzuela =

Venezuelan football referee (born 1983)

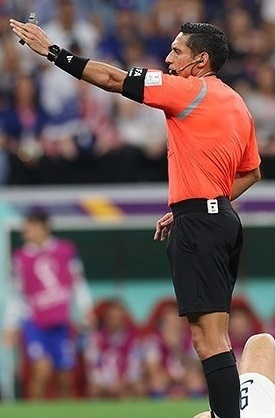
- Valenzuela officiating at the 2022 FIFA World Cup
- Full name: Jesús Noel Valenzuela Sáez
- Born: 24 November 1983 (age 42); Portuguesa, Venezuela

Domestic
Years	League	Role
2011–	Liga FUTVE	Referee

International
Years	League	Role
2013–	FIFA	Referee

Jesús Noel Valenzuela Sáez (born 24 November 1983) is a Venezuelan football referee who is listed as an international referee for FIFA since 2013.

He made his officiating debut in the 2011–12 Venezuelan Primera División season.

On 14 December 2021, Valenzuela was named CONMEBOL's best referee for 2021 by the IFFHS.

== Selected matches ==
2022 FIFA World Cup – Qatar
Date	Match	Result	Round	Venue
25 November 2022	England – United States	0–0	Group stage	Al Bayt Stadium, Al Khor
4 December 2022	France – Poland	3–1	Round of 16	Al Thumama Stadium, Doha
2026 FIFA World Cup – North America
Date	Match	Result	Round	Venue
13 June 2026	Australia – Turkey	2–0	Group stage	BC Place, Vancouver
24 June 2026	Bosnia and Herzegovina – Qatar	3–1	Group stage	Lumen Field, Seattle
30 June 2026	Ivory Coast – Norway	1–2	Round of 32	AT&T Stadium, Arlington
18 July 2026	France – England	4–6	Match for third place	Hard Rock Stadium, Miami
