= Patricio Loustau =

Argentine football referee

- Full name: Patricio Hernán Loustau
- Born: 15 April 1975 (age 51); Lomas de Zamora, Buenos Aires, Argentina
- Other occupation: Publicist

Domestic
Years	League	Role
2009−2022	Argentine Primera División	Referee

International
Years	League	Role
2011–2022	FIFA listed	Referee

Patricio Loustau (born 15 April 1975) is an Argentine former football referee who officiated primarily in Primera División since 2009, as well as for FIFA as a FIFA international referee since 2011, until his retirement on the 2022 season finale. His father, Juan Carlos Loustau, is a former football referee, who officiated in the 1990 FIFA World Cup, held in Italy.

He was selected to referee 2014 FIFA World Cup qualifiers. On 6 September 2013, after officiating the 2–1 victory for Uruguay over Peru in a qualifier at the Estadio Nacional of Perú, he had to be escorted out of the stadium due to angry Peruvian fans, who were upset over controversial calls in the match. Peruvian press claimed he was following CONMEBOL instructions, especially from the newly appointed CONMEBOL President Eugenio Figueredo, who is a Uruguayan national.

Loustau was selected as one of the referees for Copa América Centenario where he officiated the Paraguay vs. Costa Rica Group A match in Orlando, Florida.

On 30 January 2021, he whistled the final of the Copa Libertadores, between Palmeiras and Santos.
