= 2016 Supercopa Euroamericana =

Sevilla	Santa Fe
(Spain)	(Colombia)
2	1
- Date: 24 July 2016
- Venue: ESPN Wide World of Sports Complex, Bay Lake, Florida
- Referee: Vincent Apple-Chiarella (United States)
- Attendance: 5,000

The 2016 Supercopa Euroamericana was the second and final edition of the Supercopa Euroamericana, a men's football friendly tournament created by DirecTV, disputed between the Copa Sudamericana and the UEFA Europa League winners. The match was played in 2016 by Santa Fe, the 2015 Copa Sudamericana champions, and Sevilla, the 2014–15 UEFA Europa League champions. The match took place on 24 July at the ESPN Wide World of Sports Complex in Bay Lake, Florida. Sevilla won the match 2–1.

== Format ==
The match was played for 90 minutes. In case of a draw after regulation, the winners were determined via a penalty shoot-out.

== Details ==
24 July 2016
20:00 (UTC−05:00)

Sevilla (Spain)	2–1	(Colombia) Santa Fe
Konoplyanka 20'; Gameiro 21'	Report	Moya 61'

ESPN Wide World of Sports Complex, Bay Lake, Florida, United States
Attendance: 5,000
Referee: Vincent Apple-Chiarella (United States)

Sevilla	Santa Fe

GK	13	(Spain) David Soria		(yellow card) 68'
RB	16	(Spain) Coke (c)	(substituted off) 68'
CB	12	(Argentina) Nicolás Pareja		(red card) 28'
CB	2	(France) Timothée Kolodziejczak		(yellow card) 33'
LB	18	(Spain) Sergio Escudero	(substituted off) 88'	(yellow card) 87'
DM	11	(Argentina) Matías Kranevitter	(substituted off) 46'
AM	14	(Italy) Franco Vázquez	(substituted off) 70'
AM	29	(Argentina) Joaquín Correa	(substituted off) 46'
RW	10	(Spain) Pablo Sarabia
LW	22	(Ukraine) Yevhen Konoplyanka	(substituted off) 46'
CF	7	(France) Kevin Gameiro	(substituted off) 46'	(yellow card) 17'
Substitutions:
GK	1	(Spain) Sergio Rico
DF	3	(Spain) Diego González	(substituted on) 88'	(yellow card) 76'
DF	6	(Portugal) Daniel Carriço	(substituted on) 46'
DF	25	(Brazil) Mariano	(substituted on) 46'
MF	8	(Spain) Vicente Iborra	(substituted on) 70'	(yellow card) 76'
MF	15	(France) Steven Nzonzi	(substituted on) 46'
MF	20	(Spain) Vitolo	(substituted on) 68'
FW	24	(Spain) Fernando Llorente	(substituted on) 46'	(yellow card) 60'
Manager:
(Argentina) Jorge Sampaoli

GK	1	(Colombia) Róbinson Zapata
RB	27	(Colombia) Carlos Arboleda		(yellow card) 34' (yellow-red card) 45+2'
CB	3	(Colombia) José Moya		(yellow card) 36'
CB	26	(Colombia) Javier López
LB	29	(Colombia) Dairon Mosquera
DM	8	(Colombia) Leonardo Pico	(substituted off) 34'
DM	30	(Colombia) Yeison Gordillo		(yellow card) 62'
RM	17	(Colombia) Juan Daniel Roa
LM	5	(Colombia) Yulián Anchico	(substituted off) 46'	(yellow card) 31'
CF	10	(Argentina) Omar Pérez (c)	(substituted off) 55'
CF	24	(Colombia) Humberto Osorio	(substituted off) 55'
Substitutions:
GK	22	(Colombia) Leandro Castellanos
MF	11	(Argentina) Jonathan Gómez	(substituted on) 55'
MF	14	(Colombia) Baldomero Perlaza	(substituted on) 46'
MF	20	(Colombia) Kevin Salazar	(substituted on) 55'
FW	9	(Venezuela) Juan Manuel Falcón	(substituted on) 34'
Manager:
(Colombia) Alexis García

Match rules

- 90 minutes.
- Penalty shoot-out if scores still level.

== See also ==
- Sevilla FC in international football competitions
