= Lucas Boyé =

Argentine footballer (born 1996)

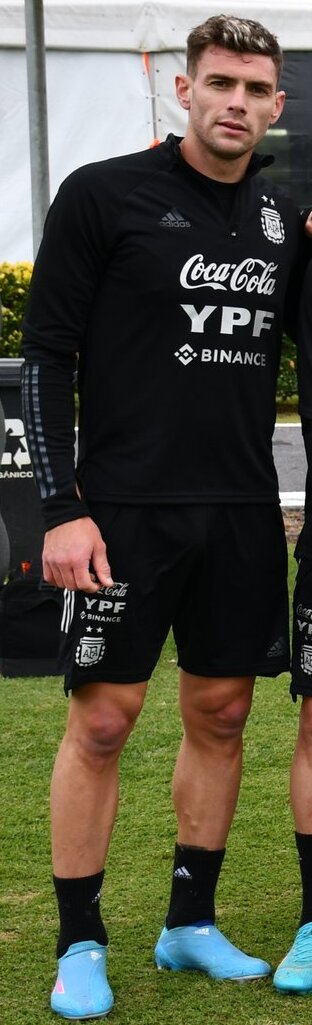
- Boyé with Argentina in 2022

Personal information
- Full name: Lucas Ariel Boyé
- Date of birth: 28 February 1996 (age 30)
- Place of birth: San Gregorio, Argentina
- Height: 1.79 m (5 ft 10 in)
- Position: Striker

Team information
- Current team: Alavés
- Number: 15

Youth career
- 2007–2014: River Plate

Senior career*
Years	Team	Apps	(Gls)
2014–2016	River Plate	42	(3)
2015–2016	→ Newell's Old Boys (loan)	6	(1)
2016–2021	Torino	41	(1)
2018	→ Celta (loan)	13	(0)
2018–2019	→ AEK Athens (loan)	23	(6)
2019–2020	→ Reading (loan)	19	(0)
2020–2021	→ Elche (loan)	34	(7)
2021–2023	Elche	62	(15)
2023–2025	Granada	64	(16)
2025–	Alavés	29	(11)

International career^{‡}
2022	Argentina	1	(0)
- * Club domestic league appearances and goals as of 27 May 2026 ‡ National team caps and goals as of 25 March 2022

Lucas Ariel Boyé (born 28 February 1996) is an Argentine professional footballer who plays as a striker for La Liga club Alavés.

== Club career ==
=== Early career ===
Boyé was called up by Ramon Diaz for River Plate's pre-season in Salta in January 2014. His unofficial debut took place on 29 January 2014 in a friendly against San Lorenzo de Almagro at the Estadio Padre Ernesto Martearena in Salta, when he replaced Jonathan Fabbro 23 minutes into the second half. River Plate lost the match to San Lorenzo 3–1.

Soon after he returned to play for the first team in another friendly, this time against the provincial team of San Luis, entering at the beginning of the second half to replace Daniel Villalba in a match which River Plate won 3–1. He made his official debut against Ferro in the final tournament of the 2013–14 Copa Argentina, in a match which River Plate won 6–5 in a penalty shootout.

His debut in the Argentine Primera División came in a 1–1 tie against Gimnasia y Esgrima on the first day of the 2014 Torneo de Transición. Four days later, on 31 August, Boyé scored his first goal in the Primera División off an assist from Tomas Martinez, the third in a match which River won 3–1 against San Lorenzo.

=== Torino ===
On 1 February 2016, he signed a contract with Italian club Torino for four seasons, starting in July 2016.

==== Loan deals ====
On 31 January 2018, he moved on loan to Spanish club Celta.

In the 2018–19 season, Boyé joined AEK on loan. On 28 October 2018 he scored his first goal for the club in a 4–0 home win game against Aris. On 23 February 2019, he scored a brace, his first in his career, sealing a 2–1 home win game against Apollon Smyrnis.

On 2 August 2019, Championship club Reading announced the signing of Boyé on a season-long loan deal from Torino. He scored his first goal for Reading in an EFL Cup tie against Wolverhampton Wanderers on 25 September 2019. However, he also went on to miss a penalty in the shootout in the same game as Reading ultimately lost.

=== Elche ===
On 21 September 2020, the newly promoted La Liga team Elche announced that Boyé had joined them on loan with an option to buy. On 13 May 2021, Elche announced that they had exercised the option to buy Boyé permanently.

=== Granada ===
On 30 August 2023, Boyé joined La Liga side Granada for a reported fee of €7 million, plus add-ons, signing a four-year contract with the club.

=== Alavés ===
On 22 August 2025, Boyé signed a four-year contract with Alavés also in the top tier.

== International career ==
In March 2022, he was first called up to senior team team for the 2022 FIFA World Cup qualification matches against Venezuela and Ecuador on 25 and 29 March 2022, respectively.

== Style of play ==
Nicknamed El Tanque (The Tank) or El Toro (The Bull), Boyé is described as a well structured, yet agile centre forward, with excellent technique and dribbling ability. He is noted for his work rate and willingness to sacrifice himself for the team. He is compared to former Roma forward Abel Balbo.

== Career statistics ==
=== Club ===
As of match played 24 May 2024

Appearances and goals by club, season and competition
Club	Season	League			National cup (Note: Includes Copa Argentina, Coppa Italia, Greek Cup, Copa del Rey, FA Cup)		League cup (Note: Includes EFL Cup)		Continental		Total	
Club	Season	Division	Apps	Goals	Apps	Goals	Apps	Goals	Apps	Goals	Apps	Goals
River Plate	2013–14	Argentine Primera División	0	0	3	0	–		6 (Note: Appearances in Copa Sudamericana)	0	9	0
River Plate	2014	Argentine Primera División	17	1	0	0	–		0	0	17	1
River Plate	2015	Argentine Primera División	9	1	2	0	–		0	0	11	1
River Plate	2016	Argentine Primera División	16	1	1	0	–		0	0	17	1
River Plate	Total		42	3	6	0	–		6	0	54	3
Newell's Old Boys (loan)	2015	Argentine Primera División	6	1	0	0	–		1	0	7	1
Torino	2016–17	Serie A	30	1	3	2	–		–		33	3
Torino	2017–18	Serie A	11	0	3	0	–		–		14	0
Torino	Total		41	1	6	2	–		–		47	3
Celta Vigo (loan)	2017–18	La Liga	13	0	0	0	–		–		13	0
AEK Athens (loan)	2018–19	Super League Greece	23	6	9	0	–		4 (Note: Appearances in UEFA Champions League)	0	36	6
Reading (loan)	2019–20	Championship	19	0	2	1	3	1	–		24	2
Elche (loan)	2020–21	La Liga	34	7	2	1	–		–		36	8
Elche	2021–22	La Liga	24	7	0	0	–		–		24	7
Elche	2022–23	La Liga	35	7	2	0	–		–		37	7
Elche	2023–24	Segunda División	3	1	0	0	–		–		3	1
Elche	Total		62	15	2	0	–		–		64	15
Granada	2023–24	La Liga	31	6	0	0	–		–		31	6
Career total			271	39	27	4	3	1	11	0	311	44

=== International ===
As of match played 25 March 2022

Appearances and goals by national team and year
National team	Year	Apps	Goals
Argentina	2022	1	0
Total		1	0

== Honours ==
River Plate

- Copa Libertadores: 2015
- Copa Sudamericana: 2014
- Recopa Sudamericana: 2015
- Suruga Bank Championship: 2015
- Supercopa Euroamericana: 2015

Individual

- Segunda División Player of the Month: April 2025
