= UEFA–CONMEBOL Club Challenge =

European/South American football match

- Organiser(s): CONMEBOL; UEFA
- Founded: 2023
- Region: South America; Europe
- Teams: 2
- Current champions: (Spain) Sevilla (1st title)
- Most championships: (Spain) Sevilla (1 title)

The UEFA–CONMEBOL Club Challenge (Spanish: UEFA–CONMEBOL Desafío de Clubes; Portuguese: UEFA–CONMEBOL Desafio de Clubes) was a football match organised by CONMEBOL and UEFA. The match was contested by the winners of the South American and European second-tier competitions UEFA Europa League and CONMEBOL Sudamericana, respectively. Organised as an annual one-off match, it is an equivalent to the former Supercopa Euroamericana, which featured the winners of the South American and European second-tier competitions. The competition was launched in 2023 as part of a renewed partnership between CONMEBOL and UEFA.

No match took place in 2024 and 2025; as of 2026 it is unclear if there are any plans for future matches.

== History ==
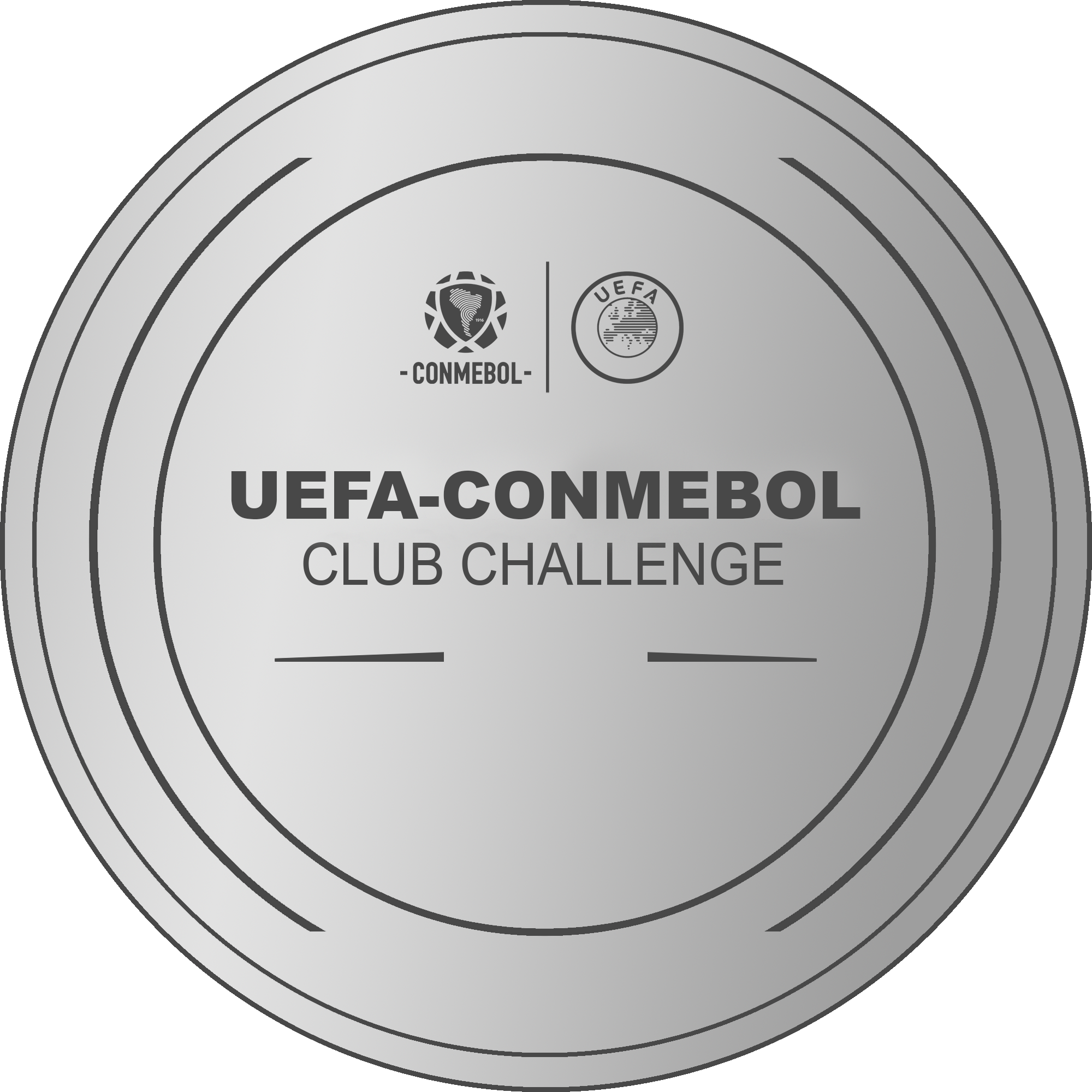
The trophy

On 12 February 2020, UEFA and CONMEBOL signed a renewed memorandum of understanding meant to enhance cooperation between the two organisations. As part of the agreement, a joint UEFA–CONMEBOL committee examined the possibility of staging European–South American intercontinental matches, for both men's and women's football and across various age groups. On 15 December 2021, UEFA and CONMEBOL again signed a renewed memorandum of understanding lasting until 2028, which included specific provisions on opening a joint office in London and the potential organisation of various football events.

Following a series of new events between teams from the two confederations, on 7 July 2023, UEFA and CONMEBOL confirmed that the UEFA Europa League and CONMEBOL Sudamericana winners would face each other in an intercontinental match, with the agreement initially for a pilot edition starting on 19 July 2023 at the Estadio Ramón Sánchez Pizjuán in Seville, Spain. The UEFA–CONMEBOL Club Challenge can be considered a successor to the Supercopa Euroamericana, played in 2015 for the first time and organised by American satellite-television company DirecTV, as a friendly football tournament, until in 2017, when the match was cancelled, after the crash of LaMia Flight 2933, carrying the majority of the Chapecoense squad on their way to the first leg of the 2016 Copa Sudamericana finals.

== Supercopa Euroamericana (predecessor) ==
There are two previous encounters between the champions of the UEFA Europa League and the Copa Sudamericana that took place in 2015 and 2016 under the name of Supercopa Euroamericana, but both are considered friendlies. The two matches were as follows:

=== 2015 ===
In the 2015 Supercopa Euroamericana: River Plate, the 2014 Copa Sudamericana champions, faced Sevilla, the 2013–14 UEFA Europa League champions.

26 March 2015
20:30 (UTC−03:00)

River Plate (Argentina)	1–0	(Spain) Sevilla
Kaprof 83'	Report

Estadio Monumental, Buenos Aires, Argentina
Attendance: 54,000
Referee: Enrique Cáceres (Paraguay)

=== 2016 ===
In the 2016 Supercopa Euroamericana: Sevilla, the 2014–15 UEFA Europa League champions, faced Santa Fe, the 2015 Copa Sudamericana champions.

24 July 2016
20:00 (UTC−05:00)

Sevilla (Spain)	2–1	(Colombia) Santa Fe
Konoplyanka 20'; Gameiro 21'	Report	Moya 61'

ESPN Wide World of Sports Complex, Bay Lake, Florida, United States
Attendance: 5,000
Referee: Vincent Apple-Chiarella (United States)

== Results ==
List of UEFA–CONMEBOL Club Challenge matches
Ed.	Year	Winners	Score	Runners-up	Venue	Location	Attendance
1	2023	(Spain) Sevilla	1–1 (4–1 p)	(Ecuador) Independiente del Valle	Estadio Ramón Sánchez Pizjuán	Seville, Spain	19,407
–	2024	(Not held) (Note: Match Atalanta vs LDU Quito not held due to scheduling issues.)					
–	2025	(Not held) (Note: Match Tottenham Hotspur vs Racing not held.)					
–	2026	(Not held) (Note: Match Aston Villa vs Lanús not held.)					

=== Results by confederation ===
Results by confederation
Confederation	Winners	Runners-up
CONMEBOL	0	1
UEFA	1	0

== See also ==
- Supercopa Euroamericana, former friendly tournament between the same contestants
- UEFA–CONMEBOL MoU
  - Finalissima
  - Women's Finalissima
  - Futsal Finalissima
  - UEFA–CONMEBOL Club Challenge
  - Under-20 Intercontinental Cup
