= 2015 Supercopa Euroamericana =

| River Plate | Sevilla |
| (Argentina) | (Spain) |
| 1 | 0 |
- Date: 26 March 2015
- Venue: Estadio Monumental, Buenos Aires
- Referee: Enrique Cáceres (Paraguay)
- Attendance: 54,000

The 2015 Supercopa Euroamericana was the first edition of the Supercopa Euroamericana, an official men's football tournament created by DirecTV and evaluated by FIFA in 2025. It was played between the winner of the Copa Sudamericana and the winner of the UEFA Europa League winners. The match was played in 2015 by River Plate, the 2014 Copa Sudamericana champions, and Sevilla, the 2013–14 UEFA Europa League champions. The match took place on 26 March at the Estadio Monumental Antonio Vespucio Liberti in Buenos Aires. River Plate won the match 1–0, with Juan Cruz Kaprof scoring the decisive goal in the eighty-third minute.

== Format ==
The match was played for 90 minutes. In the case of a draw after regulation, the winners were determined via a penalty shoot-out.

== Details ==
26 March 2015
20:30 (UTC−03:00)

| River Plate (Argentina) | 1–0 | (Spain) Sevilla |
|---|---|---|
| Kaprof 83' | Report |

Estadio Monumental, Buenos Aires, Argentina
Attendance: 54,000
Referee: Enrique Cáceres (Paraguay)

| River Plate | Sevilla |

| GK | 33 | (Argentina) Julio Chiarini |
| RB | 25 | (Argentina) Gabriel Mercado | (yellow card) 26' | (substituted off) 46' |
| CB | 24 | (Argentina) Emanuel Mammana | | (substituted off) 86' |
| CB | 20 | (Argentina) Germán Pezzella | (yellow card) 33' |
| LB | 28 | (Argentina) Leandro Vega |
| DM | 23 | (Argentina) Leonardo Ponzio (c) |
| RM | 14 | (Argentina) Augusto Solari |
| AM | 15 | (Argentina) Leonardo Pisculichi | | (substituted off) 87' |
| LM | 32 | (Argentina) Sebastián Driussi |
| CF | 29 | (Argentina) Giovanni Simeone | | (substituted off) 66' |
| CF | 31 | (Argentina) Lucas Boyé |
Substitutions:
| GK | 42 | (Argentina) Augusto Batalla |
| DF | 2 | (Argentina) Jonathan Maidana | | (substituted on) 86' |
| DF | 13 | (Argentina) Bruno Urribarri |
| MF | 4 | (Argentina) Guido Rodríguez | | (substituted on) 87' |
| MF | 30 | (Argentina) Tomás Martínez |
| FW | 7 | (Uruguay) Rodrigo Mora | | (substituted on) 66' |
| FW | 34 | (Argentina) Juan Cruz Kaprof | (yellow card) 76' | (substituted on) 46' |
Manager:
(Argentina) Marcelo Gallardo

| GK | 13 | (Portugal) Beto | | (substituted off) 46' |
| RB | 23 | (Spain) Coke |
| CB | 21 | (Argentina) Nicolás Pareja | (yellow card) 21' | (substituted off) 46' |
| CB | 24 | (Spain) Alejandro Arribas | (yellow card) 33' |
| LB | 3 | (Spain) Fernando Navarro (c) |
| RM | 22 | (Spain) Aleix Vidal (yellow card) 72' |
| CM | 6 | (Portugal) Daniel Carriço | (yellow card) 45' | (substituted off) 46' |
| CM | 37 | (Spain) Antonio Romero | | (substituted off) 46' |
| LM | 10 | (Spain) José Antonio Reyes | | (substituted off) 80' |
| CF | 14 | (Spain) Iago Aspas | (yellow card) 79' |
| CF | 7 | (France) Kevin Gameiro |
Substitutions:
| GK | 1 | (Argentina) Mariano Barbosa | | (substituted on) 46' |
| GK | 29 | (Spain) Sergio Rico |
| DF | 5 | (Portugal) Diogo Figueiras | | (substituted on) 46' |
| DF | 15 | (France) Timothée Kolodziejczak | | (substituted on) 46' |
| MF | 12 | (Spain) Vicente Iborra | (yellow card) 71' | (substituted on) 46' |
| MF | 38 | (Spain) Borja Lasso | | (substituted on) 80' |
Manager:
(Spain) Unai Emery

Assistant referees:
Rodney Aquino (Paraguay)
Darío Gaona (Paraguay)
Fourth official:
Germán Delfino (Argentina)

Match rules

- 90 minutes.
- Penalty shoot-out if scores still level.

== See also ==
- 2015 Copa EuroAmericana
- Club Atlético River Plate in international football competitions
- Sevilla FC in international football competitions
