= Sevilla FC in European football =

Spanish club in European football

Sevilla in European football
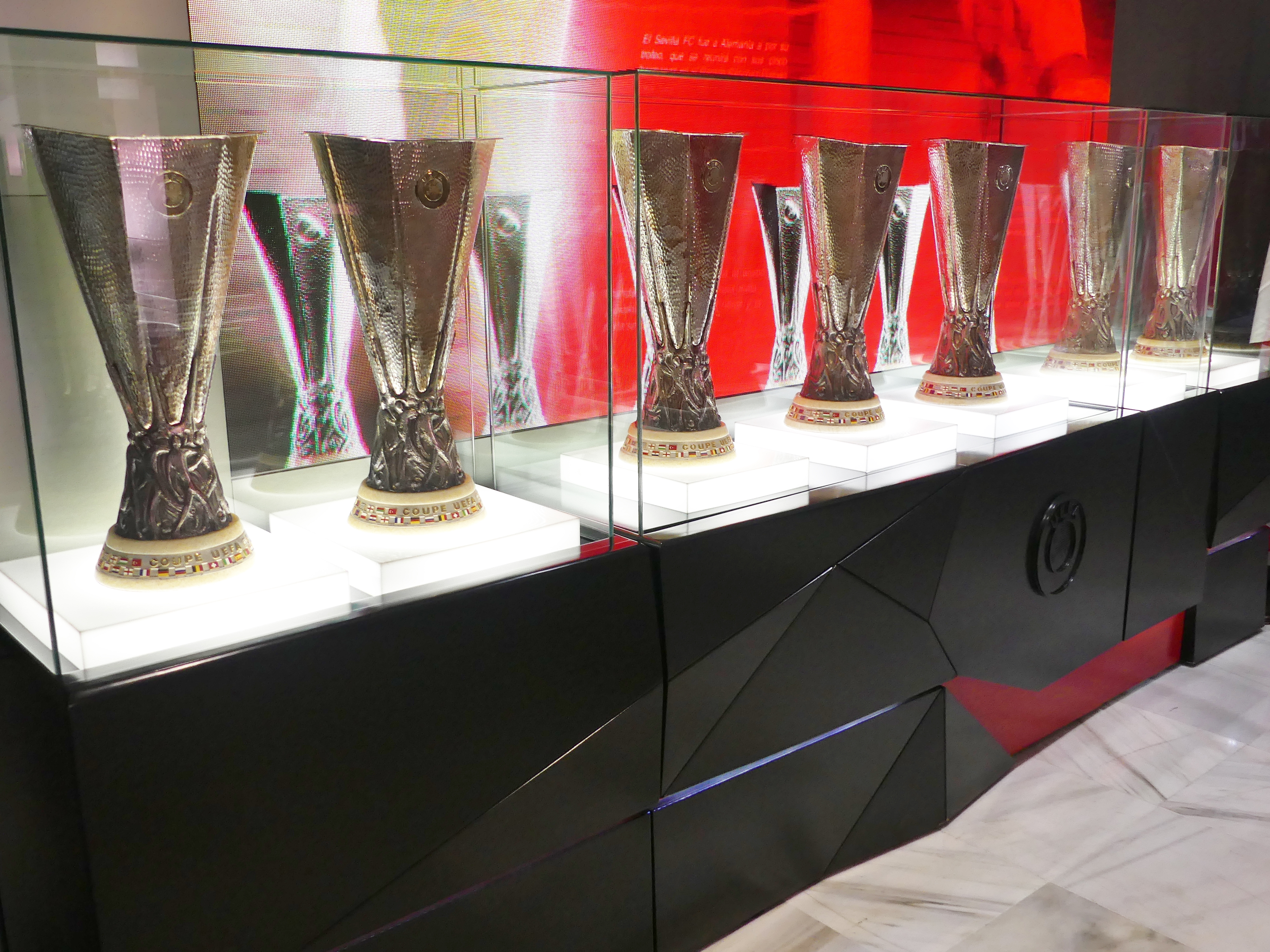
- Sevilla's all seven Europa League trophies on display in the club stadium
- Club: Sevilla FC
- Seasons played: 28
- First entry: 1957–58 European Cup
- Latest entry: 2023–24 UEFA Champions League

Titles
- Europa League: 7: 2006; 2007; 2014; 2015; 2016; 2020; 2023
- Super Cup: 1: 2006

Sevilla Fútbol Club, commonly known as Sevilla, is a professional football club based in Seville, Spain. The club first participated in a European competition in 1957, entering the European Cup, and have competed in twenty nine seasons of European competitions since then. They have won a record seven UEFA Cup/Europa League titles.

== Overall record ==
=== Statistics in UEFA competitions ===
The debut of Sevilla in European competitions took place in the 1957–58 season as a participant of that season's European Cup. Despite finishing runner-up in the league to Real Madrid, Sevilla represented Spain in the competition as Real had already qualified by winning the European Cup the season before.

Accurate as of 12 December 2023

| Competition | Pld | W | D | L | GF | GA | GD |
|---|---|---|---|---|---|---|---|
| European Cup/UEFA Champions League | 78 | 30 | 21 | 27 | 117 | 115 | +2 |
| UEFA Cup/Europa League | 158 | 92 | 33 | 33 | 283 | 133 | +150 |
| UEFA Super Cup | 7 | 1 | 1 | 5 | 12 | 16 | −4 |
| UEFA Cup Winners' Cup | 2 | 1 | 0 | 1 | 2 | 4 | −2 |
| Inter-Cities Fairs Cup | 4 | 1 | 1 | 2 | 4 | 7 | −3 |
| Total | 249 | 125 | 56 | 68 | 418 | 275 | +143 |

Pld = Matches played; W = Won; D = Drawn; L = Lost; GF = Goals for; GA = Goals against; GD = Goal difference

== Results ==
=== European Cup / UEFA Champions League ===
European Cup / UEFA Champions League
| Season | Round | Opposition | Home | Away | Agg. |
|---|---|---|---|---|---|
| 1957–58 | Qualifying Round | (Portugal) Benfica | 3–1 | 0–0 | 3–1 |
| 1957–58 | Round of 16 | (Denmark) AGF | 4–0 | 0–2 | 4–2 |
| 1957–58 | Quarter-finals | (Spain) Real Madrid | 2–2 | 0–8 | 2–10 |
| 2007–08 | Third Qualifying Round | (Greece) AEK Athens | 2–0 | 4–1 | 6–1 |
| 2007–08 | Group Stage (Group H) | (England) Arsenal | 3–1 | 0–3 | 1st |
| 2007–08 | Group Stage (Group H) | (Czech Republic) Slavia Prague | 4–2 | 3–0 | 1st |
| 2007–08 | Group Stage (Group H) | (Romania) Steaua București | 2–1 | 2–0 | 1st |
| 2007–08 | Round of 16 | (Turkey) Fenerbahçe | 3–2 (a.e.t.) | 2–3 | 5–5 (2–3 p) |
| 2009–10 | Group Stage (Group G) | (Romania) Unirea Urziceni | 2–0 | 0–1 | 1st |
| 2009–10 | Group Stage (Group G) | (Scotland) Rangers | 1–0 | 4–1 | 1st |
| 2009–10 | Group Stage (Group G) | (Germany) VfB Stuttgart | 1–1 | 3–1 | 1st |
| 2009–10 | Round of 16 | (Russia) CSKA Moscow | 1–2 | 1–1 | 2–3 |
| 2010–11 | Play-off | (Portugal) Braga | 3–4 | 0–1 | 3–5 |
| 2015–16 | Group Stage (Group D) | (Germany) Borussia Mönchengladbach | 3–0 | 2–4 | 3rd |
| 2015–16 | Group Stage (Group D) | (Italy) Juventus | 1–0 | 0–2 | 3rd |
| 2015–16 | Group Stage (Group D) | (England) Manchester City | 1–3 | 1–2 | 3rd |
| 2016–17 | Group Stage (Group H) | (Italy) Juventus | 1–3 | 0–0 | 2nd |
| 2016–17 | Group Stage (Group H) | (France) Lyon | 1–0 | 0–0 | 2nd |
| 2016–17 | Group Stage (Group H) | (Croatia) Dinamo Zagreb | 4–0 | 1–0 | 2nd |
| 2016–17 | Round of 16 | (England) Leicester City | 2–1 | 0–2 | 2–3 |
| 2017–18 | Play–off Round | (Turkey) İstanbul Başakşehir | 2–2 | 2–1 | 4–3 |
| 2017–18 | Group Stage (Group E) | (England) Liverpool | 3–3 | 2–2 | 2nd |
| 2017–18 | Group Stage (Group E) | (Slovenia) Maribor | 3–0 | 1–1 | 2nd |
| 2017–18 | Group Stage (Group E) | (Russia) Spartak Moscow | 2–1 | 1–5 | 2nd |
| 2017–18 | Round of 16 | (England) Manchester United | 0–0 | 2–1 | 2–1 |
| 2017–18 | Quarter-finals | (Germany) Bayern Munich | 1–2 | 0–0 | 1–2 |
| 2020–21 | Group Stage (Group E) | (England) Chelsea | 0–4 | 0–0 | 2nd |
| 2020–21 | Group Stage (Group E) | (Russia) Krasnodar | 3–2 | 2–1 | 2nd |
| 2020–21 | Group Stage (Group E) | (France) Rennes | 1–0 | 3–1 | 2nd |
| 2020–21 | Round of 16 | (Germany) Borussia Dortmund | 2–3 | 2–2 | 4–5 |
| 2021–22 | Group Stage (Group G) | (Austria) Red Bull Salzburg | 1–1 | 0–1 | 3rd |
| 2021–22 | Group Stage (Group G) | (Germany) VfL Wolfsburg | 2–0 | 1–1 | 3rd |
| 2021–22 | Group Stage (Group G) | (France) Lille | 1–2 | 0–0 | 3rd |
| 2022–23 | Group Stage (Group G) | (England) Manchester City | 0–4 | 1–3 | 3rd |
| 2022–23 | Group Stage (Group G) | (Germany) Borussia Dortmund | 1–4 | 1–1 | 3rd |
| 2022–23 | Group Stage (Group G) | (Denmark) Copenhagen | 3–0 | 0–0 | 3rd |
| 2023–24 | Group Stage (Group B) | (France) Lens | 1–1 | 1–2 | 4th |
| 2023–24 | Group Stage (Group B) | (Netherlands) PSV Eindhoven | 2–3 | 2–2 | 4th |
| 2023–24 | Group Stage (Group B) | (England) Arsenal | 1–2 | 0–2 | 4th |

=== UEFA Cup / UEFA Europa League ===
UEFA Cup / UEFA Europa League
| Season | Round | Opposition | Home | Away | Agg. |
|---|---|---|---|---|---|
| 1982–83 | Round of 64 | (Bulgaria) Levski Sofia | 3–1 | 3–0 | 6–1 |
| 1982–83 | Round of 32 | (Greece) PAOK | 4–0 | 0–2 | 4–2 |
| 1982–83 | Round of 16 | (West Germany) 1. FC Kaiserslautern | 1–0 | 0–4 | 1–4 |
| 1983–84 | Round of 64 | (Portugal) Sporting CP | 1–1 | 2–3 | 3–4 |
| 1990–91 | Round of 64 | (Greece) PAOK | 0–0 | 0–0 | 0–0 (4–3 p) |
| 1990–91 | Round of 32 | (Soviet Union) Torpedo Moscow | 2–1 | 1–3 | 3–4 |
| 1995–96 | Round of 64 | (Bulgaria) Botev Plovdiv | 2–0 | 1–1 | 3–1 |
| 1995–96 | Round of 32 | (Greece) Olympiacos | 1–0 | 1–2 (a.e.t.) | 2–2 (a) |
| 1995–96 | Round of 16 | (Spain) Barcelona | 1–1 | 1–3 | 2–4 |
| 2004–05 | Third Qualifying Round | (Portugal) Nacional | 2–0 | 2–1 | 4–1 |
| 2004–05 | Group Stage (Group H) | (Germany) Alemannia Aachen | 2–0 | —N/a | 2nd |
| 2004–05 | Group Stage (Group H) | (Russia) Zenit Saint Petersburg | —N/a | 1–1 | 2nd |
| 2004–05 | Group Stage (Group H) | (Greece) AEK Athens | 3–2 | —N/a | 2nd |
| 2004–05 | Group Stage (Group H) | (France) Lille | —N/a | 0–1 | 2nd |
| 2004–05 | Round of 32 | (Greece) Panathinaikos | 2–0 | 0–1 | 2–1 |
| 2004–05 | Round of 16 | (Italy) Parma | 0–0 | 0–1 | 0–1 |
| 2005–06 | Third Qualifying Round | (Germany) Mainz 05 | 0–0 | 2–0 | 2–0 |
| 2005–06 | Group Stage (Group H) | (Turkey) Beşiktaş | 3–0 | —N/a | 1st |
| 2005–06 | Group Stage (Group H) | (Russia) Zenit Saint Petersburg | —N/a | 1–2 | 1st |
| 2005–06 | Group Stage (Group H) | (Portugal) Vitória de Guimarães | 3–1 | —N/a | 1st |
| 2005–06 | Group Stage (Group H) | (England) Bolton Wanderers | —N/a | 1–1 | 1st |
| 2005–06 | Round of 32 | (Russia) Lokomotiv Moscow | 2–0 | 1–0 | 3–0 |
| 2005–06 | Round of 16 | (France) Lille | 2–0 | 0–1 | 2–1 |
| 2005–06 | Quarter-finals | (Russia) Zenit Saint Petersburg | 4–1 | 1–1 | 5–2 |
| 2005–06 | Semi-finals | (Germany) Schalke 04 | 1–0 (a.e.t.) | 0–0 | 1–0 |
| 2005–06 | Final | (England) Middlesbrough | 4–0 | | |
| 2006–07 | Third Qualifying Round | (Greece) Atromitos | 4–0 | 2–1 | 6–1 |
| 2006–07 | Group Stage (Group C) | (Czech Republic) Slovan Liberec | —N/a | 0–0 | 2nd |
| 2006–07 | Group Stage (Group C) | (Portugal) Braga | 2–0 | —N/a | 2nd |
| 2006–07 | Group Stage (Group C) | (Switzerland) Grasshopper | —N/a | 4–0 | 2nd |
| 2006–07 | Group Stage (Group C) | (Netherlands) AZ | 1–2 | —N/a | 2nd |
| 2006–07 | Round of 32 | (Romania) Steaua București | 1–0 | 2–0 | 3–0 |
| 2006–07 | Round of 16 | (Ukraine) Shakhtar Donetsk | 2–2 | 3–2 (a.e.t.) | 5–4 |
| 2006–07 | Quarter-finals | (England) Tottenham Hotspur | 2–1 | 2–2 | 4–3 |
| 2006–07 | Semi-finals | (Spain) Osasuna | 2–0 | 0–1 | 2–1 |
| 2006–07 | Final | (Spain) Espanyol | 2–2 (a.e.t.) (3–1 p) | | |
| 2008–09 | Third Qualifying Round | (Austria) Red Bull Salzburg | 2–0 | 2–0 | 4–0 |
| 2008–09 | Group Stage (Group C) | (Germany) VfB Stuttgart | 2–0 | —N/a | 4th |
| 2008–09 | Group Stage (Group C) | (Belgium) Standard Liège | —N/a | 0–1 | 4th |
| 2008–09 | Group Stage (Group C) | (Serbia) Partizan | 3–0 | —N/a | 4th |
| 2008–09 | Group Stage (Group C) | (Italy) Sampdoria | —N/a | 0–1 | 4th |
| 2010–11 | Group Stage (Group J) | (France) Paris Saint-Germain | 0–1 | 2–4 | 2nd |
| 2010–11 | Group Stage (Group J) | (Germany) Borussia Dortmund | 2–2 | 1–0 | 2nd |
| 2010–11 | Group Stage (Group J) | (Ukraine) Karpaty Lviv | 4–0 | 1–0 | 2nd |
| 2010–11 | Round of 32 | (Portugal) Porto | 1–2 | 1–0 | 2–2 (a) |
| 2011–12 | Fourth Qualifying Round | (Germany) Hannover 96 | 1–1 | 1–2 | 2–3 |
| 2013–14 | Third Qualifying Round | (Montenegro) Mladost Podgorica | 3–0 | 6–1 | 9–1 |
| 2013–14 | Fourth Qualifying Round | (Poland) Śląsk Wrocław | 4–1 | 5–0 | 9–1 |
| 2013–14 | Group Stage (Group H) | (Portugal) Estoril | 1–1 | 2–1 | 1st |
| 2013–14 | Group Stage (Group H) | (Germany) SC Freiburg | 2–0 | 2–0 | 1st |
| 2013–14 | Group Stage (Group H) | (Czech Republic) Slovan Liberec | 1–1 | 1–1 | 1st |
| 2013–14 | Round of 32 | (Slovenia) Maribor | 2–1 | 2–2 | 4–3 |
| 2013–14 | Round of 16 | (Spain) Real Betis | 0–2 (a.e.t.) | 2–0 | 2–2 (4–3 p) |
| 2013–14 | Quarter-finals | (Portugal) Porto | 4–1 | 0–1 | 4–2 |
| 2013–14 | Semi-finals | (Spain) Valencia | 2–0 | 1–3 | 3–3 (a) |
| 2013–14 | Final | (Portugal) Benfica | 0–0 (a.e.t.) (4–2 p) | | |
| 2014–15 | Group Stage (Group G) | (Netherlands) Feyenoord | 2–0 | 0–2 | 2nd |
| 2014–15 | Group Stage (Group G) | (Croatia) Rijeka | 1–0 | 2–2 | 2nd |
| 2014–15 | Group Stage (Group G) | (Belgium) Standard Liège | 3–1 | 0–0 | 2nd |
| 2014–15 | Round of 32 | (Germany) Borussia Mönchengladbach | 1–0 | 3–2 | 4–2 |
| 2014–15 | Round of 16 | (Spain) Villarreal | 2–1 | 3–1 | 5–2 |
| 2014–15 | Quarter-finals | (Russia) Zenit Saint Petersburg | 2–1 | 2–2 | 4–3 |
| 2014–15 | Semi-finals | (Italy) Fiorentina | 3–0 | 2–0 | 5–0 |
| 2014–15 | Final | (Ukraine) Dnipro Dnipropetrovsk | 3–2 | | |
| 2015–16 | Round of 32 | (Norway) Molde | 3–0 | 0–1 | 3–1 |
| 2015–16 | Round of 16 | (Switzerland) Basel | 3–0 | 0–0 | 3–0 |
| 2015–16 | Quarter-finals | (Spain) Athletic Bilbao | 1–2 (a.e.t.) | 2–1 | 3–3 (5–4 p) |
| 2015–16 | Semi-finals | (Ukraine) Shakhtar Donetsk | 3–1 | 2–2 | 5–3 |
| 2015–16 | Final | (England) Liverpool | 3–1 | | |
| 2018–19 | Second Qualifying Round | (Hungary) Újpest | 4–0 | 3–1 | 7–1 |
| 2018–19 | Third Qualifying Round | (Lithuania) Žalgiris Vilnius | 1–0 | 5–0 | 6–0 |
| 2018–19 | Play-off Round | (Czech Republic) Sigma Olomouc | 3–0 | 1–0 | 4–0 |
| 2018–19 | Group Stage (Group J) | (Russia) Krasnodar | 3–0 | 1–2 | 1st |
| 2018–19 | Group Stage (Group J) | (Belgium) Standard Liège | 5–1 | 0–1 | 1st |
| 2018–19 | Group Stage (Group J) | (Turkey) Akhisarspor | 6–0 | 3–2 | 1st |
| 2018–19 | Round of 32 | (Italy) Lazio | 2–0 | 1–0 | 3–0 |
| 2018–19 | Round of 16 | (Czech Republic) Slavia Prague | 2–2 | 3–4 (a.e.t.) | 5–6 |
| 2019–20 | Group Stage (Group A) | (Cyprus) APOEL | 1–0 | 0–1 | 1st |
| 2019–20 | Group Stage (Group A) | (Azerbaijan) Qarabağ | 2–0 | 3–0 | 1st |
| 2019–20 | Group Stage (Group A) | (Luxembourg) F91 Dudelange | 3–0 | 5–2 | 1st |
| 2019–20 | Round of 32 | (Romania) CFR Cluj | 0–0 | 1–1 | 1–1 (a) |
| 2019–20 | Round of 16 | (Italy) Roma | 2–0 | | |
| 2019–20 | Quarter-finals | (England) Wolverhampton Wanderers | 1–0 | | |
| 2019–20 | Semi-finals | (England) Manchester United | 2–1 | | |
| 2019–20 | Final | (Italy) Inter Milan | 3–2 | | |
| 2021–22 | Knockout Round Play-offs | (Croatia) Dinamo Zagreb | 3–1 | 0–1 | 3–2 |
| 2021–22 | Round of 16 | (England) West Ham United | 1–0 | 0–2 (a.e.t.) | 1–2 |
| 2022–23 | Knockout Round Play-offs | (Netherlands) PSV Eindhoven | 3–0 | 0–2 | 3–2 |
| 2022–23 | Round of 16 | (Turkey) Fenerbahçe | 2–0 | 0–1 | 2–1 |
| 2022–23 | Quarter-finals | (England) Manchester United | 3–0 | 2–2 | 5–2 |
| 2022–23 | Semi-finals | (Italy) Juventus | 2–1 (a.e.t.) | 1–1 | 3–2 |
| 2022–23 | Final | (Italy) Roma | 1–1 (a.e.t.) (4–1 p) | | |

=== UEFA Super Cup ===
UEFA Super Cup
| Edition | Opposition | Score |
|---|---|---|
| (Monaco) 2006 | (Spain) Barcelona | 3–0 |
| (Monaco) 2007 | (Italy) Milan | 1–3 |
| (Wales) 2014 | (Spain) Real Madrid | 0–2 |
| (Georgia (country)) 2015 | (Spain) Barcelona | 4–5 (a.e.t.) |
| (Norway) 2016 | (Spain) Real Madrid | 2–3 (a.e.t.) |
| (Hungary) 2020 | (Germany) Bayern Munich | 1–2 (a.e.t.) |
| (Greece) 2023 | (England) Manchester City | 1–1 (4–5 p) |

=== European Cup Winners' Cup ===
European Cup Winners' Cup (defunct)
| Season | Round | Opposition | Home | Away | Agg. |
|---|---|---|---|---|---|
| 1962–63 | Qualifying Round | (Scotland) Rangers | 2–0 | 0–4 | 2–4 |

=== Inter-Cities Fairs Cup (Non-UEFA Competition) ===
Inter-Cities Fairs Cup (defunct)
| Season | Round | Opposition | Home | Away | Agg. |
|---|---|---|---|---|---|
| 1966–67 | Qualifying Round | (Romania) Dinamo Pitești | 2–2 | 0–2 | 2–4 |
| 1970–71 | Round of 64 | (Turkey) Eskişehirspor | 1–0 | 1–3 | 2–3 |

=== Supercopa Euroamericana (Friendly UEFA-CONMEBOL) ===
Euroamerican Supercup
| Season | Round | Opposition | Agg. |
|---|---|---|---|
| 2015 | Final | (Argentina) River Plate | 1–0 |
| 2016 | Final | (Colombia) Independiente Santa Fe | 1–2 |

=== UEFA–CONMEBOL Club Challenge (Successor to Supercopa Euroamericana) ===
UEFA–CONMEBOL Club Challenge
| Season | Round | Opposition | Agg. |
|---|---|---|---|
| 2023 | Final | (Ecuador) Independiente del Valle | 1–1 (4–1 p) |
