= Iván Romero (footballer, born 2001) =

Spanish footballer

Personal information
- Full name: Iván Romero de Ávila Araque
- Date of birth: 10 April 2001 (age 25)
- Place of birth: La Solana, Spain
- Height: 1.72 m (5 ft 8 in)
- Position: Striker

Team information
- Current team: Levante
- Number: 9

Youth career
- –2017: Albacete
- 2017–2020: Sevilla

Senior career*
Years	Team	Apps	(Gls)
2019–2022	Sevilla B	36	(14)
2021–2023	Sevilla	6	(0)
2022–2023	→ Tenerife (loan)	34	(4)
2023–	Levante	87	(17)
- * Club domestic league appearances and goals as of 27 May 2026

Iván Romero de Ávila Araque (born 10 April 2001), known as Iván Romero, is a Spanish professional footballer who plays as a striker for La Liga club Levante.

== Career ==
Born in La Solana, Ciudad Real, Castilla–La Mancha, Romero joined Sevilla FC's youth setup in September 2017, from Albacete Balompié. He made his senior debut with the reserves on 14 December 2019, starting in a 0–0 Segunda División B away draw against Club Recreativo Granada.

Definitely promoted to the B-side for the 2020–21 campaign, Romero scored his first senior goals on 21 November 2020, netting a brace in a 2–1 away defeat of Córdoba CF. The following 8 April, he renewed his contract until 2024, and finished the season with 12 goals.

Romero made his first team – and La Liga – debut with the Andalusians on 15 August 2021, coming on as a late substitute for Fernando in a 3–0 home success over Rayo Vallecano.

On 31 August 2022, Romero was loaned to Segunda División side CD Tenerife for the season. He scored his first professional goal on 24 September, scoring his team's first in a 2–2 away draw against SD Ponferradina.

On 12 August 2023, Romero signed a permanent three-year contract with Levante UD also in the second division.

== Career statistics ==
As of match played on 16 October 2023

Appearances and goals by club, season and competition
Club	Season	League			Copa del Rey		Europe		Total	
Club	Season	Division	Apps	Goals	Apps	Goals	Apps	Goals	Apps	Goals
Sevilla	2021–22	La Liga	5	0	4	0	1 (Note: Appearance(s) in UEFA Champions League)	0	10	0
Sevilla	2022–23	La Liga	1	0	0	0	0	0	1	0
Sevilla	Total		6	0	4	0	1	0	11	0
Tenerife (loan)	2022–23	Segunda División	34	4	1	1	–		35	5
Levante	2023–24	Segunda División	3	0	0	0	–		3	0
Career total			43	4	5	1	1	0	49	5

== Honours ==
Sevilla

- UEFA–CONMEBOL Club Challenge: 2023

Levante

- Segunda División: 2024–25
