= UEFA–CONMEBOL memorandum of understanding =

Memorandum of understanding between the South American and European football associations

- Created: 12 February 2020; 6 years ago
- Ratified: January 2022
- Signatories: UEFA and CONMEBOL

The UEFA–CONMEBOL memorandum of understanding (Spanish: Memorando de Entendimiento) is an agreement between UEFA and CONMEBOL, the association football confederations of Europe and South America, respectively, signed between both parties with the aim of achieving close collaboration for the development of this sport in the regions. It was signed on 12 February 2020 and extended on 15 December 2021 in a first stage, and on 2 June 2022 in a second stage. This will permit creation of official championships in the branches of men's, women's, youth and indoor football and the possibility of exchanging referees in the tournaments organised by both entities.

In January 2022, CONMEBOL and UEFA authorities met at the CONMEBOL headquarters in Asunción, Paraguay, and ratified the agreements they had already signed for future competitions. Both parts also agreed to establish a joint office in London.

== Mission and objectives ==
The MoU seeks to provide assistance and support between both confederations to establish and implement projects and activities related to:

- the promotion and development of grassroots football, youth football and women's football
- the organisation of championships
- marketing, legal and social responsibility matters
- security;
- the promotion of ethical principles and good governance in football

== Committees ==
In order to move forward with the projects, 4 joint committees were created through the memorandum. The strategies of both confederations in the different committees are coordinated in a Joint Representation Office located in London, England, United Kingdom, inaugurated on 4 April 2022.

The committees are:

=== Refereeing ===
As of the signing of the MoU, a referee exchange program was started, allowing referees and assistant referees appointed by their respective confederation to participate in matches in competitions organised by the other signatory party. Below is the list of referees appointed within the exchange program:

Appointed referees in exchange program
Organizing confederation	Competition	Appointed referee	Role	Association
UEFA	UEFA Euro 2020	Fernando Rapallini	Referee	Argentina (CONMEBOL)
UEFA	UEFA Euro 2020	Juan Pablo Belatti	Assistant referee	Argentina (CONMEBOL)
UEFA	UEFA Euro 2020	Diego Yamil Bonfá	Assistant referee	Argentina (CONMEBOL)
UEFA	UEFA Women's Euro 2022	Emikar Calderas	Referee	Venezuela (CONMEBOL)
UEFA	UEFA Women's Euro 2022	Migdalia Rodríguez Chirino	Assistant referee	Venezuela (CONMEBOL)
UEFA	UEFA Women's Euro 2022	Mary Blanco Bolívar	Assistant referee	Colombia (CONMEBOL)
CONMEBOL	2021 Copa América	Jesús Gil Manzano	Referee	Spain (UEFA)
CONMEBOL	2021 Copa América	Diego Barbero Sevilla	Assistant referee	Spain (UEFA)
CONMEBOL	2021 Copa América	Ángel Nevado Rodríguez	Assistant referee	Spain (UEFA)
CONMEBOL	2021 Copa América	Ricardo de Burgos Bengoetxea	VAR	Spain (UEFA)
CONMEBOL	2021 Copa América	José Luis Munuera Montero	VAR	Spain (UEFA)
CONMEBOL	2022 South American U-20; Women's Championship	Maria Sole Ferrieri Caputi	Referee	Italy (UEFA)
CONMEBOL	2022 South American U-20; Women's Championship	Giulia Tempestilli	Assistant referee	Italy (UEFA)
CONMEBOL	2022 South American U-20; Women's Championship	Eliana Fernández González	Assistant referee	Spain (UEFA)
CONMEBOL	2022 Copa América Femenina	Sandra Braz	Referee	Portugal (UEFA)
CONMEBOL	2022 Copa América Femenina	Andreia Ferreira Souza	Assistant referee	Portugal (UEFA)
CONMEBOL	2022 Copa América Femenina	Rita Cabañero Mompó	Assistant referee	Spain (UEFA)
CONMEBOL	2022 Copa Libertadores Femenina	Maria Marotta	Referee	Italy (UEFA)
CONMEBOL	2022 Copa Libertadores Femenina	Tiziana Trasciatti	Assistant referee	Italy (UEFA)
CONMEBOL	2022 Copa Libertadores Femenina	Silvia Fernández Pérez	Assistant referee	Spain (UEFA)
Both confederations (intercontinental championships)	2022 Finalissima	Piero Maza	Referee	Chile (CONMEBOL)
Both confederations (intercontinental championships)	2022 Finalissima	Christian Schiemann	Assistant referee	Chile (CONMEBOL)
Both confederations (intercontinental championships)	2022 Finalissima	Claudio Ríos	Assistant referee	Chile (CONMEBOL)
Both confederations (intercontinental championships)	2022 Finalissima	Jesús Gil Manzano	4th official	Spain (UEFA)
Both confederations (intercontinental championships)	2022 Finalissima	Alejandro Hernández Hernández	VAR	Spain (UEFA)
Both confederations (intercontinental championships)	2022 Finalissima	Juan Martínez Munuera	AVAR	Spain (UEFA)
Both confederations (intercontinental championships)	2022 Finalissima	Tiago Lopes Martins	AVAR	Portugal (UEFA)
Both confederations (intercontinental championships)	2022 UEFA-CONMEBOL Under-20 Intercontinental Cup	Derlis López	Referee	Paraguay (CONMEBOL)
Both confederations (intercontinental championships)	2022 UEFA-CONMEBOL Under-20 Intercontinental Cup	Roberto Cañete	Assistant referee	Paraguay (CONMEBOL)
Both confederations (intercontinental championships)	2022 UEFA-CONMEBOL Under-20 Intercontinental Cup	José Villagra	Assistant referee	Paraguay (CONMEBOL)
Both confederations (intercontinental championships)	2022 UEFA-CONMEBOL Under-20 Intercontinental Cup	José Méndez	4th official	Argentina (CONMEBOL)
Both confederations (intercontinental championships)	2022 UEFA-CONMEBOL Under-20 Intercontinental Cup	Germán Delfino	VAR	Argentina (CONMEBOL)
Both confederations (intercontinental championships)	2022 UEFA-CONMEBOL Under-20 Intercontinental Cup	Maximiliano Del Yeso	AVAR	Argentina (CONMEBOL)
Both confederations (intercontinental championships)	2022 Futsal Finalissima	Henry Gutiérrez	Referee	Bolivia (CONMEBOL)
Both confederations (intercontinental championships)	2022 Futsal Finalissima	Ricardo Messa	Referee	Brazil (CONMEBOL)
Both confederations (intercontinental championships)	2022 Futsal Finalissima	Gean Telles	Referee	Brazil (CONMEBOL)
Both confederations (intercontinental championships)	2022 Futsal Finalissima	Christian Espínola	Referee	Chile (CONMEBOL)
Both confederations (intercontinental championships)	2022 Futsal Finalissima	Jonhatan Herbas	Referee	Ecuador (CONMEBOL)
Both confederations (intercontinental championships)	2022 Futsal Finalissima	Mario Espichan	Referee	Peru (CONMEBOL)
Both confederations (intercontinental championships)	2022 Futsal Finalissima	Daniel Rodríguez	Referee	Uruguay (CONMEBOL)
Both confederations (intercontinental championships)	2022 Futsal Finalissima	Yuri García	Referee	Colombia (CONMEBOL)
Both confederations (intercontinental championships)	2022 Futsal Finalissima	Daniel Manrique	Timekeeper	Colombia (CONMEBOL)
Both confederations (intercontinental championships)	2022 Futsal Finalissima	José Villar	Timekeeper	Venezuela (CONMEBOL)

=== Women's football ===
The agreement provides a development strategy for this branch in all its member associations, as well as the creation of different competitions. The first women's football championship planned from the MoU is the UEFA-CONMEBOL Women's Finalissima, a tournament that emulates the CONMEBOL–UEFA Cup of Champions in the women's branch.

=== Development and coaches ===
The purpose of this committee is to provide a joint project for the creation of:

- Elite young player development programs
- Scout Development
- Joint coaching licences: A mutual recognition of titles and coaching licences (for example, equivalence between UEFA Pro License and CONMEBOL PRO License) is planned for 2023.

=== Competitions ===
The competitions created under the memorandum are the following ones:

- Finalissima: a quadrennial match featuring men's football champions of the UEFA Euro and the CONMEBOL Copa América. There were two editions prior to the signing of the MoU (1985 and 1993). Its relaunch was made official on 28 September 2021, agreeing to organise three new editions. The first of them was held on 1 June 2022 at Wembley Stadium, under the name of Finalissima.
- Under-20 Intercontinental Cup: a biennial match featuring men's football champions of the UEFA Youth League and the U-20 Copa Libertadores. Its first edition was held on 21 August 2022 at the Centenario Stadium in Montevideo.
- Futsal Finalissima: a quadrennial match featuring men's futsal champions and runners-up of the UEFA Futsal Championship and the Copa América de Futsal. The first edition was held from 15 to 18 September 2022 at the Movistar Arena Stadium in Buenos Aires.
- UEFA–CONMEBOL Women's Finalissima: a quadrennial match featuring women's football champions of the UEFA Women's Euro and the Women's Conmebol Copa América. The first edition was played on FIFA Women's International Matchweek of February 2023 in Europe.
- UEFA–CONMEBOL Club Challenge: an annual match featuring men's football champions of the CONMEBOL and UEFA's second-tier competitions the UEFA Europa League and CONMEBOL Sudamericana. Its first edition was held on 19 July 2023 at the Estadio Ramón Sánchez Pizjuán in Seville.
