= Kevin Salazar =

Colombian footballer (born 1996)

Personal information
- Full name: Kevin David Salazar Chiquiza
- Date of birth: 9 February 1996 (age 30)
- Place of birth: Bogotá, Colombia
- Height: 1.70 m (5 ft 7 in)
- Position: Midfielder

Team information
- Current team: Fortaleza
- Number: 26

Youth career
- Academia Xeneize
- 2012–2013: Nike Academy

Senior career*
Years	Team	Apps	(Gls)
2015–2016	Fortaleza	53	(5)
2016–2017	Santa Fe	22	(0)
2018	Atlético Bucaramanga	7	(0)
2019	Rionegro Águilas	16	(1)
2020–2024	La Equidad	84	(8)
2024	Jaguares de Cordoba	10	(0)
2025–	Fortaleza	2	(0)
- * Club domestic league appearances and goals as of 14 August 2025

Kevin David Salazar Chiquiza (born February 9, 1996), is a Colombian professional footballer who plays as a midfielder for Categoría Primera A club Fortaleza.

== Club career ==
Salazar started his career with local Bogotá side Academia Xeneize, before participating in 'The Chance', organised by the Nike Academy. He finished the competition as one of the 2013 winners.

He then joined Colombian side Fortaleza, where he was praised for his performances, most notably in a 2–0 win over Millonarios.

In June 2016, it was announced that Salazar had joined Santa Fe. He was again credited for excellent performances before suffering a fracture in the metatarsal of his right foot in a collision with Alianza Petrolera goalkeeper Ricardo Jerez Jr. in a Liga Águila match on 26 September 2016.

== Career statistics ==
=== Club ===
As of 22 December 2018.

Club	Season	League			Cup		Continental		Other		Total	
Club	Season	Division	Apps	Goals	Apps	Goals	Apps	Goals	Apps	Goals	Apps	Goals
Fortaleza	2015	Categoría Primera B	35	4	2 (Note: Appearances in the Copa Colombia)	0	–		0	0	37	4
Fortaleza	2016	Categoría Primera A	18	1	1	1	–		0	0	19	2
Fortaleza	Total		53	5	3	1	0	0	0	0	56	6
Santa Fe	2016	Categoría Primera A	10	0	3	0	4 (Note: One appearance in the Supercopa Euroamericana, two appearances in the Recopa Sudamericana and one appearance in the Copa Sudamericana)	0	0	0	17	0
Santa Fe	2017	Categoría Primera A	12	0	2	0	3 (Note: Two appearances in the Copa Sudamericana and one appearance in the Copa Libertadores)	0	1 (Note: Appearances in the Superliga Colombiana)	0	18	0
Santa Fe	Total		22	0	5	0	7	0	1	0	35	0
Atlético Bucaramanga	2018	Categoría Primera A	7	0	2	0	–		0	0	9	0
Career total			82	5	10	1	7	0	1	0	100	6
