= Jonas Eriksson (referee) =

Swedish football referee

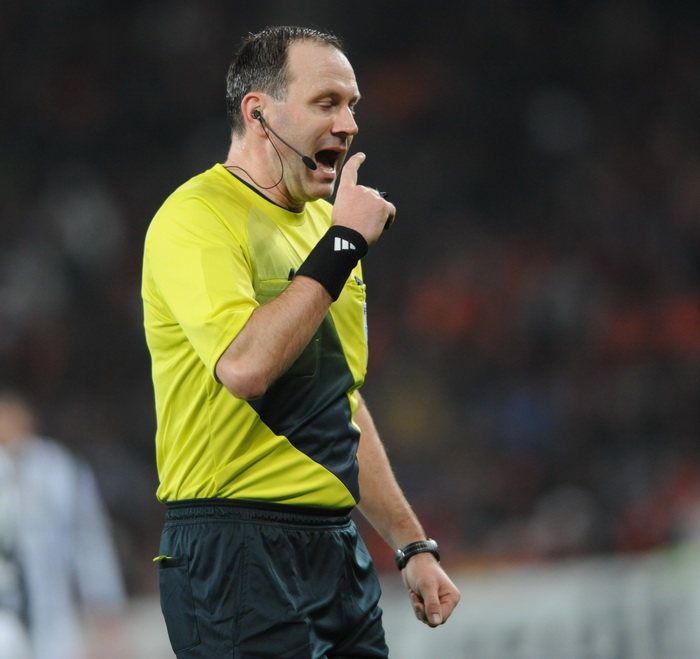
- Eriksson in 2012
- Full name: Jonas Eriksson
- Born: 28 March 1974 (age 52); Luleå, Sweden
- Other occupation: Salesman

Domestic
| Years | League | Role |
| 1998–2018 | Superettan | Referee |
| 2000–2018 | Allsvenskan | Referee |

International
| Years | League | Role |
| 2002–2018 | FIFA listed | Referee |

Jonas Eriksson (born 28 March 1974) is a Swedish former football referee. He was a full international referee for FIFA between 2002 and 2018.

== Career ==
Eriksson became a professional referee in 1994 and has been an Allsvenskan referee since 2000. He has refereed 263 matches in Allsvenskan, 47 matches in Superettan and 112 international matches as of 2014.

In August 2013, Eriksson was chosen to referee 2013 UEFA Super Cup between Chelsea and Bayern Munich. He was called by FIFA to officiate in Brazil's 2014 FIFA World Cup. His first match in the World Cup was between the United States and Ghana. He was the fourth official at the 2015 UEFA Champions League final match of Juventus vs. Barcelona at Olympiastadion in Berlin, Germany on 6 June 2015.

On 18 May 2016, he refereed the UEFA Europa League final between Liverpool and Sevilla.

On 30 May 2018, it was announced he would end his career as a referee.

== Business career ==
Jonas Eriksson was formerly sales director and partner in a company named IEC Sports. The company bought and sold TV rights. Eriksson and the other owners later sold the company, and Eriksson then became a multi-millionaire.

== Personal life ==
Eriksson was born and raised in Luleå, where he started his career in football, first as a player, then as a referee in his teens in the local club IFK Luleå. He resides in Sigtuna, with his wife and two daughters.

== See also ==
- List of football referees
