= 2023 UEFA–CONMEBOL Club Challenge =

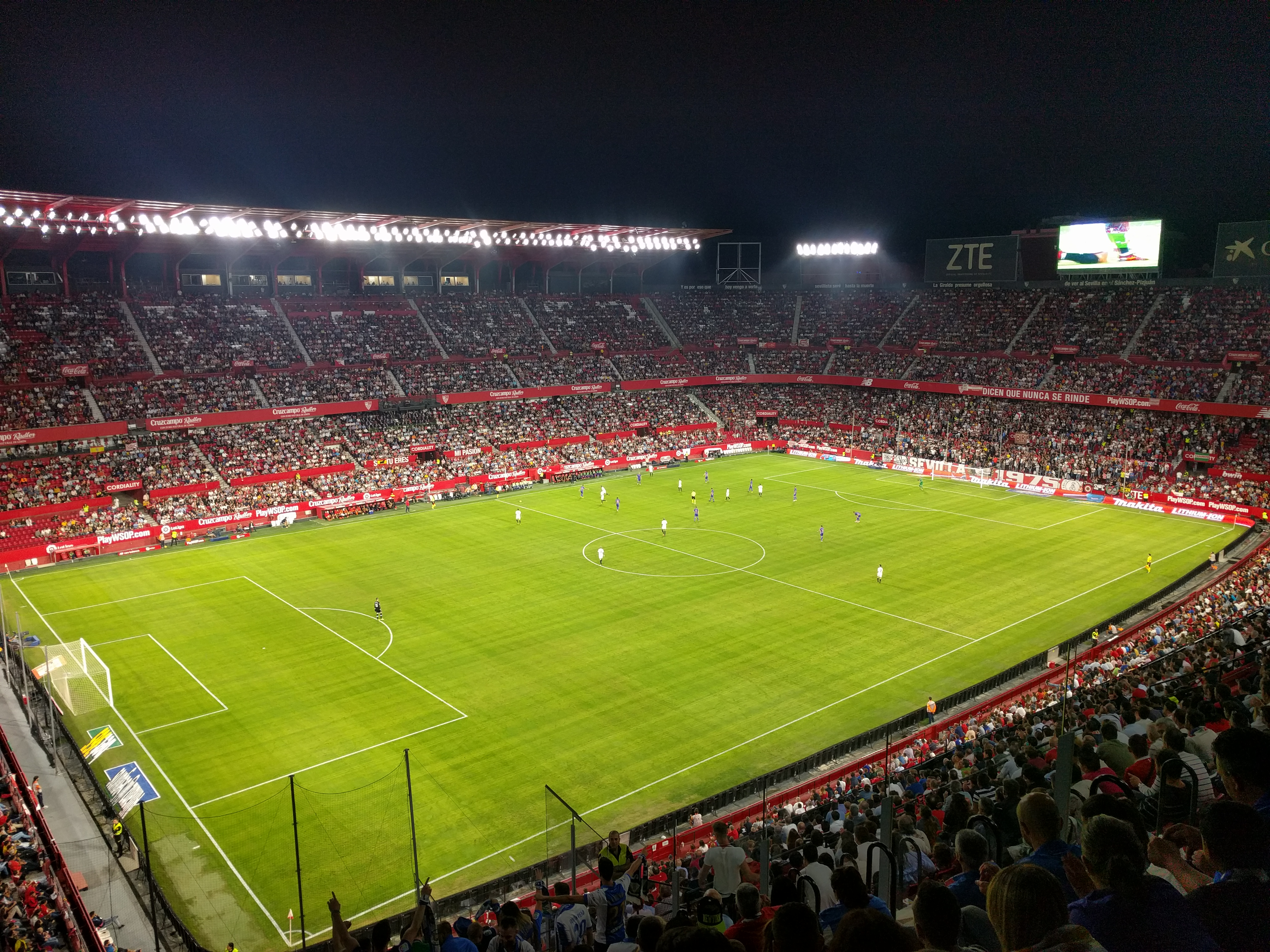
- The Ramón Sánchez Pizjuán in Seville hosted the match
- Event: UEFA–CONMEBOL Club Challenge
Sevilla	Independiente del Valle
(Spain)	(Ecuador)
1	1
- Sevilla won 4–1 on penalties
- Date: 19 July 2023
- Venue: Ramón Sánchez Pizjuán, Seville
- Referee: Rade Obrenović (Slovenia)
- Attendance: 19,407
- Weather: Sunny; 36 °C (97 °F)

The 2023 UEFA–CONMEBOL Club Challenge (Spanish: UEFA–CONMEBOL Desafío de Clubes 2023), named Antonio Puerta XII in honour of the former Sevilla player who died in 2007, was the inaugural edition of the UEFA–CONMEBOL Club Challenge, a football match organised by UEFA and CONMEBOL between the reigning champions of the UEFA Europa League and Copa Sudamericana. UEFA was in charge of the main organization of the first edition.

The UEFA–CONMEBOL Club Challenge was officially launched on 7 July 2023 as part of the UEFA–CONMEBOL memorandum of understanding.

The single match was played on 19 July 2023 at Ramón Sánchez Pizjuán Stadium in Seville, Spain, between Spanish club Sevilla, the 2022–23 UEFA Europa League winners and Ecuadorian club Independiente del Valle, the 2022 Copa Sudamericana winners.

== Background ==
The match was announced by UEFA and CONMEBOL as a pilot edition. This was the first meeting between a Spanish and an Ecuadorian club representing UEFA and CONMEBOL, respectively. The match was, at the same time, the twelfth edition of the Antonio Puerta Trophy, an annual football match hosted by Sevilla dedicated to its former player Antonio Puerta, who died in 2007 at the age of 22 following a cardiac arrest, during the inaugural match of the 2007–08 La Liga season between Sevilla and Getafe. The official nature of the match was initially not entirely clear; UEFA considered it as a friendly due to the unlimited substitutions agreed by both clubs. However, on 10 June 2024, UEFA considered the tournament as official.

Sevilla won the 2022–23 UEFA Europa League on 31 May 2023, defeating Italian side Roma 4–1 penalties following a 1–1 draw after extra time in the final, making it a record of seven UEFA Cup/Europa League titles for the Sevillians. For its part, Independiente del Valle won their second Copa Sudamericana title by beating Brazilian side São Paulo 2–0 in the final of the 2022 Copa Sudamericana held on 1 October 2022.

In the run-up to the match, Sevilla were in pre-season preparations ahead of their 2023–24 campaign, while Independiente del Valle were in the middle of their 2023 season, having won the first stage of the 2023 Ecuadorian Serie A and looking ahead to their round of 16 tie against Colombia's Deportivo Pereira in the 2023 Copa Libertadores.

== Teams ==
Team	Qualification
(Spain) Sevilla	2022–23 UEFA Europa League winners
(Ecuador) Independiente del Valle	2022 CONMEBOL Sudamericana winners

== Pre-match ==
=== Officials ===
The refereeing team for this edition was appointed by UEFA.

=== Squads ===
Sevilla named a 30-man squad for a training camp to be held from 9 to 19 July 2023, including the UEFA–CONMEBOL Club Challenge match.

Independiente del Valle traveled with 23 players to its mid-season tour in Spain, which, in addition to the UEFA–CONMEBOL Club Challenge match, included meetings with Orlando Pirates and Getafe. Players Kendry Páez, Patrick Mercado and Yaimar Medina were expected to join the team after their participation in the U-20 Copa Libertadores, but ultimately did not do so by decision of their team.

== Match ==
=== Details ===
19 July 2023
22:00 CEST

Sevilla (Spain)	1–1	(Ecuador) Independiente del Valle
P. Ortiz 90+1'	Report	Díaz 10'
Penalties
Jordán (penalty scored); Romero (penalty scored); Idrissi (penalty scored); Gómez (penalty scored)	4–1	(penalty missed) Faravelli; (penalty scored) Hoyos; (penalty missed) Moreno

Ramón Sánchez Pizjuán, Seville
Attendance: 19,407
Referee: Rade Obrenović (Slovenia)

Sevilla	Independiente del Valle

GK	1	(Serbia) Marko Dmitrović
RB	35	(Spain) Juanlu
CB	14	(France) Tanguy Nianzou
CB	37	(Spain) Kike Salas
LB	3	(Spain) Adrià Pedrosa	(substituted off) 65'
CM	8	(Spain) Joan Jordán (c)
CM	38	(Spain) Manu Bueno	(substituted off) 77'
RW	7	(Spain) Suso	(substituted off) 60'
AM	24	(Argentina) Alejandro Gómez
LW	21	(Spain) Óliver Torres
CF	41	(Spain) Isaac Romero	(substituted off) 77'
Substitutes:
GK	31	(Spain) Alberto Flores
GK	33	(Spain) Matías Árbol
DF	2	(Argentina) Gonzalo Montiel
DF	18	(Argentina) Federico Gattoni	(substituted on) 65'
MF	32	(Spain) Pedro Ortiz	(substituted on) 77'
FW	36	(Spain) Iván Romero	(substituted on) 77'
FW	28	(Morocco) Oussama Idrissi	(substituted on) 60'
Manager:
(Spain) José Luis Mendilibar

GK	1	(Ecuador) Moisés Ramírez	(yellow card) 90'
CB	14	(Argentina) Mateo Carabajal
CB	80	(Ecuador) Joao Ortiz
CB	2	(Argentina) Agustín García Basso
RWB	13	(Chile) Matías Fernández
LWB	9	(Ecuador) Kevin Rodríguez		(substituted off) 72'
CM	16	(Argentina) Cristian Pellerano (c)		(substituted off) 83'
CM	8	(Argentina) Lorenzo Faravelli
RW	7	(Ecuador) Jordy Alcívar		(substituted off) 72'
CF	19	(Argentina) Lautaro Díaz		(substituted off) 46'
LW	10	(Ecuador) Junior Sornoza	(yellow card) 44'	(substituted off) 60'
Substitutes:
GK	12	(Ecuador) Alexis Villa
DF	4	(Ecuador) Anthony Landázuri		(substituted on) 72'
DF	6	(Ecuador) Carlos Sánchez
DF	15	(Ecuador) Beder Caicedo		(substituted on) 83'
DF	17	(Ecuador) Gustavo Cortez		(substituted on) 46'
DF	20	(Ecuador) Christian García
MF	31	(Ecuador) Danny Cabezas
MF	23	(Ecuador) Patrickson Delgado
MF	58	(Ecuador) Bryan García
FW	11	(Ecuador) Michael Hoyos		(substituted on) 60'
FW	18	(Bolivia) Marcelo Moreno		(substituted on) 72'
Manager:
(Argentina) Martín Anselmi

Assistant referees:
Tomaž Klančnik (Slovenia)
Aleksandar Kasapovič (Slovenia)
Fourth official:
Simone Sozza (Italy)

Match rules

- 90 minutes
- Penalty shoot-out if scores level
- Twelve named substitutes
- Unlimited substitutions (Note: Each team was given only three opportunities to make substitutions, excluding substitutions made at half-time.)
