= 2016 UEFA Europa League final =

- Match programme cover
- Event: 2015–16 UEFA Europa League
Liverpool	Sevilla
(England)	(Spain)
1	3
- Date: 18 May 2016
- Venue: St. Jakob-Park, Basel
- Man of the Match: Coke (Sevilla)
- Referee: Jonas Eriksson (Sweden)
- Attendance: 34,429
- Weather: Rain; 18 °C (64 °F); 51% humidity

The 2016 UEFA Europa League final was a football match between Liverpool of England and Sevilla of Spain on 18 May 2016 at St. Jakob-Park in Basel, Switzerland. The showpiece event was the final match of the 2015–16 UEFA Europa League, the 45th season of Europe's secondary club football tournament organised by UEFA. Liverpool were appearing in their fourth final, after their appearances in 1973, 1976 and 2001, all of which they won. Sevilla were appearing in their fifth final and third in succession. They had appeared in 2006 and 2007, as well as the previous two finals in 2014 and 2015, winning all four.

Liverpool entered the competition in the group stages, while Sevilla started in the round of 32 after finishing third in their Champions League group. Liverpool's ties in the knockout phase ranged from close affairs to comfortable victories. A last-minute goal against Borussia Dortmund of Germany secured a 5–4 aggregate victory in the quarter-finals, while they beat Villarreal of Spain 3–1 over two legs in the semi-final. Sevilla's matches were similar. They beat the Swiss team FC Basel 3–0 on aggregate in the Round of 16, but their quarter-final match with fellow Spanish team Athletic Bilbao went to a penalty shoot-out, which they won 5–4 after the tie had finished 3–3 over two-legs.

Watched by a crowd of 34,429, Liverpool took the lead in the 35th minute when striker Daniel Sturridge scored. However, they conceded within the first minute of the second half when Sevilla striker Kevin Gameiro levelled the match. Sevilla took the lead in the 64th minute when captain Coke scored. They extended their lead six minutes later when Coke scored his second of the match. Liverpool were unable to respond during the remainder of the match which meant Sevilla won the match 3–1 to win the competition for the fifth time, and third in succession.

Sevilla earned the right to play against the winners of the 2015–16 UEFA Champions League, Real Madrid, in the 2016 UEFA Super Cup. They also qualified for the group stage of the 2016–17 UEFA Champions League, as Real Madrid also qualified for the group stage through domestic performance, that meant the berth reserved for the Champions League title holders was not used and passed to the Europa League title holders.

== Venue ==
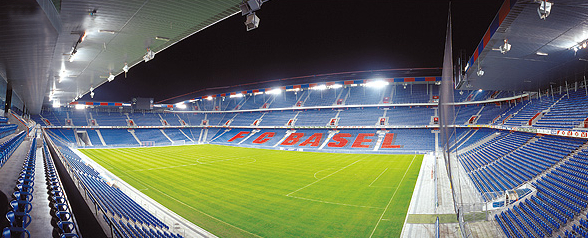
The St. Jakob-Park in Basel was selected to host the final in September 2014.

The St. Jakob-Park was announced as the venue of the final at the UEFA Executive Committee meeting in Nyon, Switzerland, on 18 September 2014. This was the first European club final hosted at the stadium, although the previous stadium of the same name, the St. Jakob Stadium, which opened in 1954 for the 1954 FIFA World Cup and closed in 1998, hosted four European Cup Winners' Cup finals in 1969, 1975, 1979 and 1984.

The current St. Jakob-Park, nicknamed "Joggeli" by fans, was built in 1998 and opened in 2001, and is the home stadium of Basel. It hosted six matches at UEFA Euro 2008, including the opening match and a semi-final. Its current capacity is 38,512, but is reduced to nearly 36,000 seats for UEFA competitions.

After Basel got transferred to the Europa League after losing to Maccabi Tel Aviv on away goals, Basel had the chance to become the first team to win the competition in home ground since Feyenoord in 2002, and the first to win it under the Europa League banner. This possibility ended after Basel was eliminated in the round of 16 by Sevilla.

== Background ==
The UEFA Cup was an annual football club competition organised by UEFA since 1971 for eligible European football clubs. Clubs qualified for the competition based on their performance in their national leagues and cup competitions. It was the second-tier competition of European club football, ranking below the UEFA Champions League. In 2010, the UEFA Cup evolved into the Europa League.

Liverpool's first appearance in European football was in the 1964–65 European Cup, when they reached the semi-finals. Since then, they had appeared in eleven European finals with five European Cup triumphs (1977, 1978, 1981, 1984, 2005), two losses in 1985 and 2007, three UEFA Cup victories in 1973, 1976 and 2001 and defeats in the final of the European Cup Winners's Cup in 1966. Sevilla had first appeared in European competition in the 1957–58 European Cup when they reached the quarter-finals. This represented Sevilla's best performance until they won the first of their four Europa League victories in 2006. They had subsequently won in 2007, 2014, and 2015. This was their third final in succession. Victory would secure a record fifth success in the competition, while victory for Liverpool would see them join Sevilla as the most successful team in the competition with four victories. This was the first time the two sides had met each other in European competition.

The goal-line technology system Hawk-Eye was used for the match. This was the first UEFA competition match to employ goal-line technology, following approval by the UEFA Executive Committee in January 2016.

== Route to the final ==
Note: In the table, the score of the finalist is given first (H = home; A = away).

(England) Liverpool				Round	(Spain) Sevilla			
Europa League					Champions League			
Opponent	Result			Group stage (EL, CL)	Opponent	Result		
(France) Bordeaux	1–1 (A)			Matchday 1	(Germany) Borussia Mönchengladbach	3–0 (H)		
(Switzerland) Sion	1–1 (H)			Matchday 2	(Italy) Juventus	0–2 (A)		
(Russia) Rubin Kazan	1–1 (H)			Matchday 3	(England) Manchester City	1–2 (A)		
(Russia) Rubin Kazan	1–0 (A)			Matchday 4	(England) Manchester City	1–3 (H)		
(France) Bordeaux	2–1 (H)			Matchday 5	(Germany) Borussia Mönchengladbach	2–4 (A)		
(Switzerland) Sion	0–0 (A)			Matchday 6	(Italy) Juventus	1–0 (H)		
Group B winners: Pos / Team / Pld / Pts; 1 / (England) Liverpool / 6 / 10; 2 / (Switzerland) Sion / 6 / 9; 3 / (Russia) Rubin Kazan / 6 / 6; 4 / (France) Bordeaux / 6 / 4; Source: Soccerway				Final standings	Group D third place: Pos / Team / Pld / Pts; 1 / (England) Manchester City / 6 / 12; 2 / (Italy) Juventus / 6 / 11; 3 / (Spain) Sevilla / 6 / 6; 4 / (Germany) Borussia Mönchengladbach / 6 / 5; Source: UEFA			
Group B winners: Pos / Team / Pld / Pts; 1 / (England) Liverpool / 6 / 10; 2 / (Switzerland) Sion / 6 / 9; 3 / (Russia) Rubin Kazan / 6 / 6; 4 / (France) Bordeaux / 6 / 4; Source: Soccerway					Europa League			
Opponent	Agg.	1st leg	2nd leg	Knockout phase	Opponent	Agg.	1st leg	2nd leg
(Germany) FC Augsburg	1–0	0–0 (A)	1–0 (H)	Round of 32	(Norway) Molde	3–1	3–0 (H)	0–1 (A)
(England) Manchester United	3–1	2–0 (H)	1–1 (A)	Round of 16	(Switzerland) Basel	3–0	0–0 (A)	3–0 (H)
(Germany) Borussia Dortmund	5–4	1–1 (A)	4–3 (H)	Quarter-finals	(Spain) Athletic Bilbao	3–3 (5–4 p)	2–1 (A)	1–2 (a.e.t.) (H)
(Spain) Villarreal	3–1	0–1 (A)	3–0 (H)	Semi-finals	(Ukraine) Shakhtar Donetsk	5–3	2–2 (A)	3–1 (H)

=== Liverpool ===
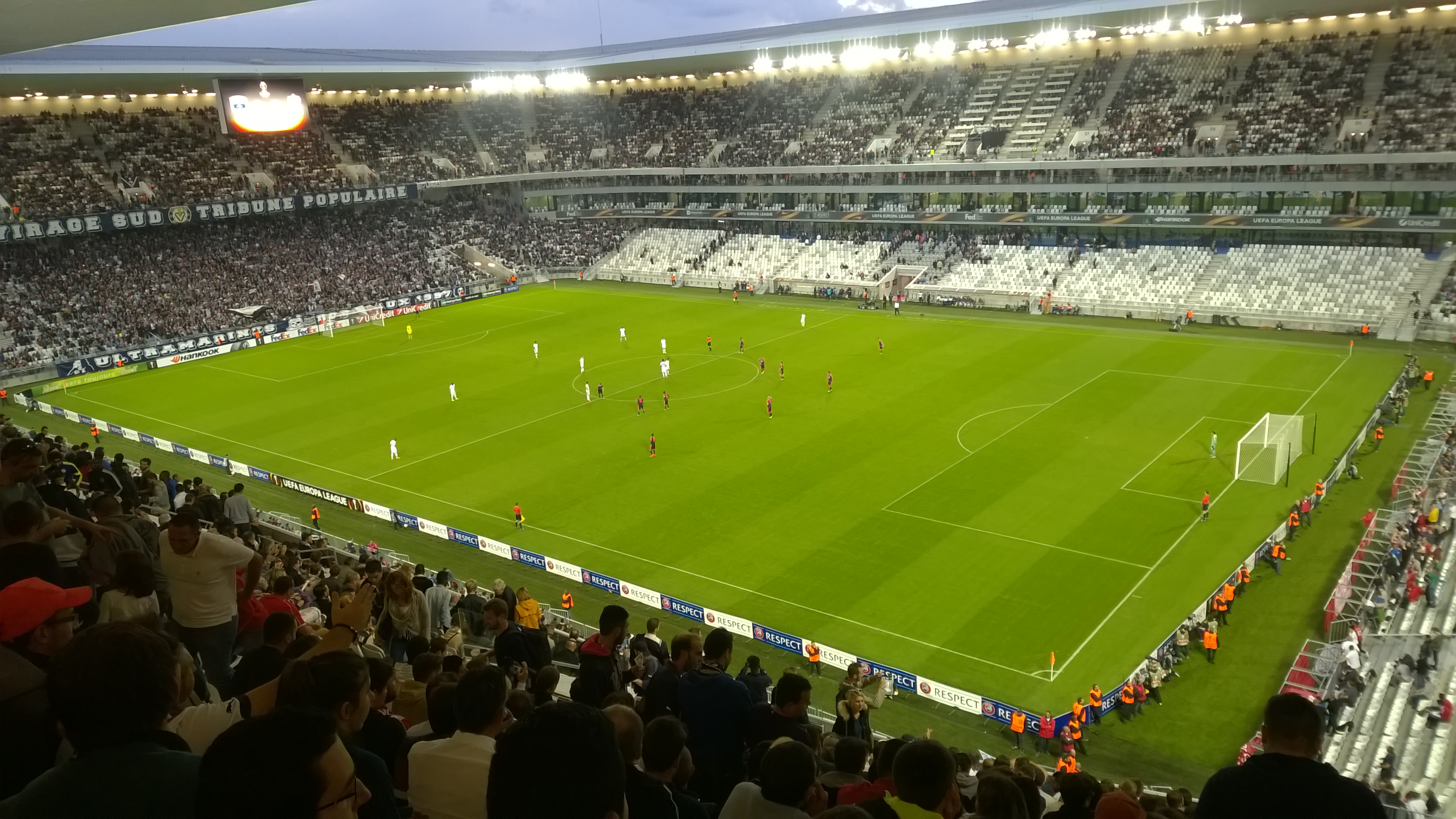
Liverpool's first match in the group stage against Bordeaux ended in a 1–1 draw.

Liverpool were drawn in Group B along with Rubin Kazan of Russia, Bordeaux of France, and Sion of Switzerland. Their first match was away against Bordeaux at the Nouveau Stade de Bordeaux. Adam Lallana scored for Liverpool in the 65th minute but Bordeaux equalised in the 81st minute when Jussiê to secure a 1–1 draw. Their next match again at their home ground, Anfield against Sion finished by the same scoreline. A fourth minute goal by Lallana was followed by an Ebenezer Assifuah goal for Sion in the 18th minute. Liverpool's next match was against Rubin Kazan at Anfield. Before the match, manager Brendan Rodgers had been sacked and replaced by Jürgen Klopp. Despite being the more attacking of the two teams, Liverpool 35 shots to Kazan's 5, the match finished in another 1–1 draw. Liverpool faced Kazan again in the return match at the Kazan Arena. A goal by Jordon Ibe in the 52nd minute secured their first win of the season in the competition. Liverpool faced Bordeaux at anfield in their next match. they went behind in the 33rd minute when Henri Saivet scored but a Penalty kick by James Milner and a goal by Christian Benteke in first-half stoppage time secured a 2–1 victory which meant Liverpool would progress to the knockout stages of the competition. Their final match in the group stage, away at Sion, finished in a 0–0 draw. The result meant Liverpool finished top of Group B with 10 points.

Liverpool were drawn against FC Augsburg of Germany in the round of 32. The first leg was held at Augsburg home ground, the Augsburg Arena, finished 0–0 in what Andy Hunter, writing in The Guardian, described as a "tame goalless draw." Liverpool won the second leg at Anfield 1–0 courtesy of a penalty from Milner. Liverpool were drawn against domestic rivals Manchester United in the round of 16. Liverpool went ahead in the first leg at Anfield in the 2oth minute when Daniel Sturridge converted a penalty after Nathaniel Clyne was fouled in the United penalty area by Memphis Depay. Roberto Firmino scored in the 73rd minute to secure a 2–0 victory. The second leg at United's home ground, Old Trafford, saw United go ahead in the 32nd minute when Anthony Martial scored a penalty following a foul by Clyne. Liverpool equalised in the 45th minute when Philippe Coutinho scored and with no further goals, the match ended 1–1 with Liverpool's progression to the quarter-finals with a 3–1 aggregate victory.

Their next opponents were Borussia Dortmund of Germany, the team Liverpool manager Klopp had managed the season before. The first leg at Dortmund's home ground, the Westfalenstadion, saw Liverpool take the lead in the 36th minute when Divock Origi scored. The lead was shortlived as Mats Hummels equalised for Dortmund in the 38th minute to secure a 1–1 draw. Dortmund scored two early goals in the second leg at Anfield courtesy of Henrikh Mkhitaryan and Pierre-Emerick Aubameyang. The first half finished with Dortmund two goals up which meant Liverpool needed to score three to progress due to the away goals rule. Liverpool scored early on in the second half when Origi, the lead was shortlived as Marco Reus scored for Dortmund nine minutes later. Once again, Liverpool needed to score three goals to progress. Coutinho scored in the 66th minute and Liverpool levelled the match 11 minutes later when Mamadou Sakho. Still requiring one goal to progress to the semi-finals, Dejan Lovren headed in Milner's cross in stoppage time to win the match 4–3 and the tie 5–4 on aggregate. The match was described by Phil McNulty of BBC Sport, as "one of the most dramatic comebacks Anfield has seen." Liverpool faced Villarreal of Spain in the semi-finals. The first leg at Villarreal's home ground, El Madrigal, was on course to finish goalless until Adrián López scored in the last minute to secure a 1–0 victory for Villarreal. Liverpool went ahead in the seventh minute of the second leg at Anfield when Bruno Soriano scored an own goal. Sturridge extended their lead in the 63rd minute and a goal from Lallana in the 81st minute, following a red card for Víctor Ruiz, secured a 3–0 win and Liverpool's progression to the final.

== Pre-match ==
=== Ambassador ===
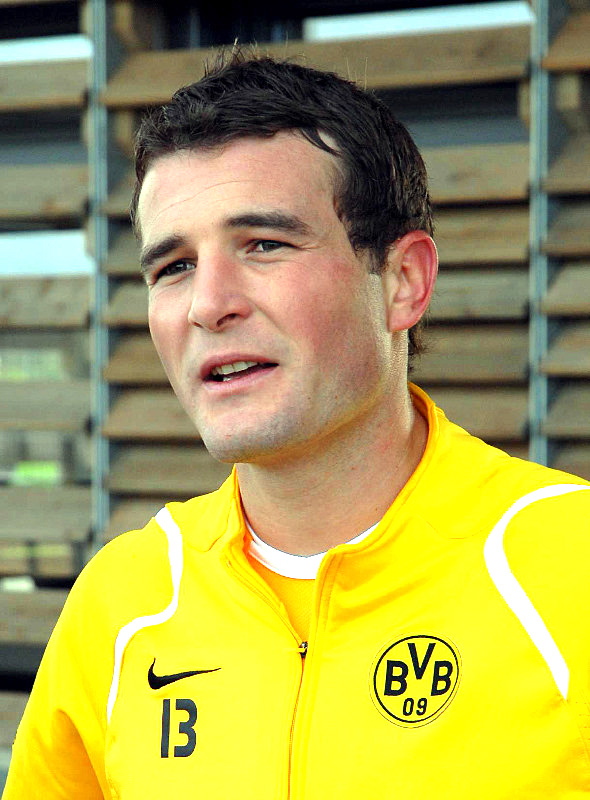
Alexander Frei

Former Switzerland and Basel striker Alexander Frei was named the ambassador for the final.

=== Identity ===
UEFA unveiled the brand identity of the final on 28 August 2015 in Monaco ahead of the group stage draw. The logo features the Basel landmark Marktplatz.

=== Ticketing ===
With a stadium capacity of 35,000, a total amount of 27,000 tickets were available to fans and the general public, with the two finalist teams receiving 9,000 tickets each and with 9,000 tickets being available for sale to fans worldwide via UEFA.com from 23 February to 21 March 2016 in four price categories: CHF 180, CHF 120, CHF 90, and CHF 50. The remaining tickets were allocated to the local organising committee, UEFA and national associations, commercial partners and broadcasters, and to serve the corporate hospitality programme.

UEFA was forced to defend the choice of St. Jakob-Park, which is the second smallest venue to host the competition's final, as the final competition venue after Liverpool and Sevilla were confirmed as the finalists. Liverpool manager Jürgen Klopp, who initially told the supporters to travel to Basel even without a ticket, later backtracked from his suggestion.

=== Officials ===
In May 2016, Swedish referee Jonas Eriksson was selected to supervise the final. He was joined by fellow Swedish officials Mathias Klasenius and Daniel Wärnmark as assistant referees, Stefan Johannesson and Markus Strömbergsson as additional assistant referees, Mehmet Culum as reserve assistant referee, and Norwegian official Svein Oddvar Moen as fourth official.

== Match ==
=== Summary ===
In the 35th minute Daniel Sturridge scored with a shot using the outside of his left foot from out on the left after a pass from Philippe Coutinho. Seventeen seconds into the second half Kevin Gameiro made it 1–1 when he scored three yards out after a cross from the right by Mariano who got past Alberto Moreno by putting the ball between his legs.

Sevilla missed two more chances to score before they went in front in the 64th minute when Coke scored with a low right foot shot to the corner of the net from twenty yards. Coke got his second in the 70th minute with a right foot shot from six yards out on the right after the ball broke to him via a deflection off a Liverpool player.

With this defeat, Liverpool became the second English club and fourth overall – after Hamburger SV, Fiorentina and Arsenal – to have been runner-up in all three major European competitions (European Champion Clubs' Cup/UEFA Champions League, UEFA Cup/UEFA Europa League, and the now-defunct Cup Winners' Cup).

=== Details ===
The "home" team (for administrative purposes) was determined by an additional draw held after the semi-final draw, which was held on 15 April 2016 at UEFA headquarters in Nyon, Switzerland.

18 May 2016
20:45 UTC+2

Liverpool (England)	1–3	(Spain) Sevilla
Sturridge 35'	Report	Gameiro 46'; Coke 64', 70'

St. Jakob-Park, Basel
Attendance: 34,429
Referee: Jonas Eriksson (Sweden)

Liverpool	Sevilla

GK	22	(Belgium) Simon Mignolet
RB	2	(England) Nathaniel Clyne	(yellow card) 90+4'
CB	6	(Croatia) Dejan Lovren	(yellow card) 30'
CB	4	(Ivory Coast) Kolo Touré		(substituted off) 82'
LB	18	(Spain) Alberto Moreno
CM	7	(England) James Milner (c)
CM	23	(Germany) Emre Can
RW	20	(England) Adam Lallana		(substituted off) 73'
AM	11	(Brazil) Roberto Firmino		(substituted off) 69'
LW	10	(Brazil) Philippe Coutinho
CF	15	(England) Daniel Sturridge
Substitutes:
GK	52	(Wales) Danny Ward
DF	37	(Slovakia) Martin Škrtel
MF	14	(England) Jordan Henderson
MF	21	(Brazil) Lucas
MF	24	(Wales) Joe Allen		(substituted on) 73'
FW	9	(Belgium) Christian Benteke		(substituted on) 82'
FW	27	(Belgium) Divock Origi	(yellow card) 72'	(substituted on) 69'
Manager:
(Germany) Jürgen Klopp

GK	31	(Spain) David Soria
RB	25	(Brazil) Mariano	(yellow card) 84'
CB	3	(France) Adil Rami	(yellow card) 77'	(substituted off) 78'
CB	6	(Portugal) Daniel Carriço
LB	18	(Spain) Sergio Escudero
CM	4	(Poland) Grzegorz Krychowiak
CM	15	(France) Steven Nzonzi
RW	23	(Spain) Coke (c)
AM	19	(Argentina) Éver Banega	(yellow card) 57'	(substituted off) 90+3'
LW	20	(Spain) Vitolo	(yellow card) 56'
CF	9	(France) Kevin Gameiro		(substituted off) 89'
Substitutes:
GK	1	(Spain) Sergio Rico
DF	5	(France) Timothée Kolodziejczak		(substituted on) 78'
DF	21	(Argentina) Nicolás Pareja
MF	8	(Spain) Vicente Iborra		(substituted on) 89'
MF	14	(Uruguay) Sebastián Cristóforo		(substituted on) 90+3'
MF	22	(Ukraine) Yevhen Konoplyanka
FW	24	(Spain) Fernando Llorente
Manager:
(Spain) Unai Emery

Man of the Match:
Coke (Sevilla)

Assistant referees:
Mathias Klasenius (Sweden)
Daniel Wärnmark (Sweden)
Fourth official:
Svein Oddvar Moen (Norway)
Additional assistant referees:
Stefan Johannesson (Sweden)
Markus Strömbergsson (Sweden)
Reserve assistant referee:
Mehmet Culum (Sweden)

Match rules

- 90 minutes.
- 30 minutes of extra time if necessary.
- Penalty shoot-out if scores still level.
- Seven named substitutes, of which up to three may be used.

=== Statistics ===
First half
Statistic	Liverpool	Sevilla
Goals scored	1	0
Total shots	5	1
Shots on target	3	0
Saves	0	2
Ball possession	53%	47%
Corner kicks	2	3
Fouls committed	11	4
Offsides	1	1
Yellow cards	1	0
Red cards	0	0

Second half
Statistic	Liverpool	Sevilla
Goals scored	0	3
Total shots	5	10
Shots on target	1	4
Saves	1	1
Ball possession	55%	45%
Corner kicks	2	4
Fouls committed	8	5
Offsides	0	2
Yellow cards	2	4
Red cards	0	0

Overall
Statistic	Liverpool	Sevilla
Goals scored	1	3
Total shots	10	11
Shots on target	4	4
Saves	1	3
Ball possession	54%	46%
Corner kicks	4	7
Fouls committed	19	9
Offsides	1	3
Yellow cards	3	4
Red cards	0	0

== See also ==
- 2016 UEFA Champions League final
- 2016 UEFA Super Cup
- Liverpool F.C. in international football
- Sevilla FC in European football
- 2015–16 Liverpool F.C. season
- 2015–16 Sevilla FC season
