= Supercopa Euroamericana =

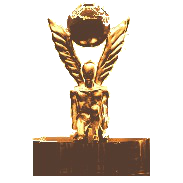
- Founded: 2015
- Abolished: 2016
- Region: CONMEBOL; UEFA
- Teams: 2
- Last champions: (Spain) Sevilla (1st title)
- Most championships: (Argentina) River Plate (Spain) Sevilla (1 title each)
- Website: Official website

The Supercopa Euroamericana was an official football tournament evaluated by FIFA in 2025 and created by DirecTV, which was held between 2015 and 2016 in Americas. It was contested between the Copa Sudamericana and the UEFA Europa League winners. The match was organised by DirecTV in 2015 and LaLiga World Challenge in 2016.

== Format ==
The match was played for 90 minutes. In case of a draw after regulation time, the winners were determined via a penalty shoot-out.

== List of finals ==
- The "Season" column refers to the season the competition was held, and wikilinks to the article about that season.
- The wikilinks in the "Score" column point to the article about that season's final game.

List of Supercopa Euroamericana finals
Ed.	Year	Nat.	Winners	Score	Runners-up	Nat.	Venue	City	Att.
1	2015	(Argentina)	River Plate	1–0	Sevilla	(Spain)	Estadio Monumental	Buenos Aires	54,000
2	2016	(Spain)	Sevilla	2–1	Santa Fe	(Colombia)	Wide World of Sports Complex	(United States) Bay Lake	5,000

== Performances ==
=== By club ===
Performances in the Supercopa Euroamericana by club
Club	Titles	Runners-up	Seasons won	Seasons runner-up
(Spain) Sevilla	1	1	2016	2015
(Argentina) River Plate	1	0	2015	—
(Colombia) Santa Fe	0	1	—	2016

=== By country ===
Performance by nation
Nation	Winners	Runners-up
Spain	1	1
Argentina	1	0
Colombia	0	1

=== Performances by confederation ===
Performance by confederation
Confederation	Titles	Runners-up
CONMEBOL	1	1
UEFA	1	1

== See also ==
- UEFA–CONMEBOL Club Challenge, its successor
- Copa EuroAmericana
