= José Moya =

Colombian footballer (born 1992)

Personal information
- Full name: José David Moya Rojas
- Date of birth: 7 August 1992 (age 34)
- Place of birth: Gigante, Colombia
- Height: 1.84 m (6 ft 1/2 in)
- Position: Centre-back

Team information
- Current team: Deportivo Pereira
- Number: 3

Youth career
- Atlético Huila

Senior career*
Years	Team	Apps	(Gls)
2012	Atlético Huila		
2013–2015	Leones	68	(7)
2016	Cortuluá	23	(2)
2016–2020	Santa Fe	66	(5)
2019–2020	→ Deportes Tolima (loan)	27	(1)
2021	Huracán	16	(2)
2022	Deportes Tolima	19	(0)
2023	Guaraní	29	(1)
2024–	Deportivo Pereira	56	(3)
- * Club domestic league appearances and goals as of 12 December 2025

José David Moya Rojas (born 7 August 1992) is a Colombian professional footballer who plays as a centre-back for Categoría Primera A club Deportivo Pereira.

== Career statistics ==
=== Club ===
As of 27 June 2022

Club	Division	League			Cup		Continental		Total	
Club	Division	Season	Apps	Goals	Apps	Goals	Apps	Goals	Apps	Goals
Atlético Huila	Categoría Primera A	2012	0	0	6	0	—		6	0
Leones	Categoría Primera B	2013	14	1	7	1	—		21	2
Leones	Categoría Primera B	2014	27	3	3	0	—		30	3
Leones	Categoría Primera B	2015	27	3	2	0	—		29	3
Leones	Total		68	7	12	1	0	0	80	8
Cortuluá	Categoría Primera A	2016	23	2	0	0	—		23	2
Santa Fe	Categoría Primera A	2016	11	1	1	0	0	0	12	1
Santa Fe	Categoría Primera A	2017	19	1	3	1	4	0	26	2
Santa Fe	Categoría Primera A	2018	17	2	3	1	6	0	24	3
Santa Fe	Categoría Primera A	2019	15	1	4	0	—		19	1
Santa Fe	Total		62	5	11	2	10	0	81	7
Deportes Tolima	Categoría Primera A	2019	21	1	6	1	0	0	27	2
Deportes Tolima	Categoría Primera A	2020	6	0	0	0	4	0	10	0
Deportes Tolima	Total		27	1	6	1	4	0	37	2
Santa Fe	Categoría Primera A	2020	6	0	2	0	—		8	0
Huracán	Primera División	2021	16	2	1	0	—		17	2
Deportes Tolima	Categoría Primera A	2022	19	0	4	0	7	0	30	0
Career total			221	17	42	4	21	0	284	21
