= Coke (footballer) =

Spanish footballer (born 1987)

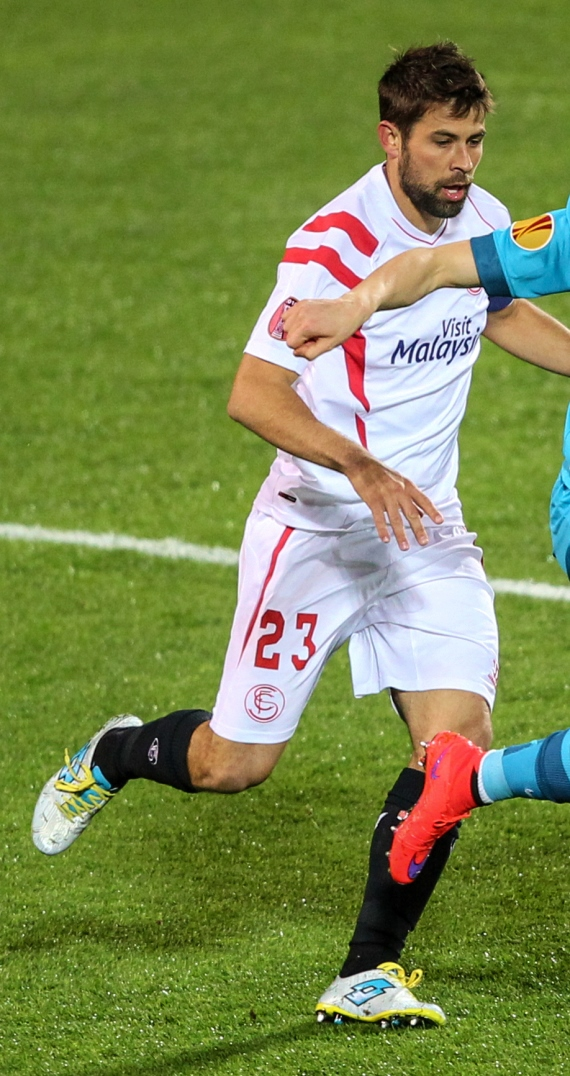
- Coke playing for Sevilla in 2015

Personal information
- Full name: Jorge Andújar Moreno
- Date of birth: 26 April 1987 (age 39)
- Place of birth: Madrid, Spain
- Height: 1.82 m (6 ft 0 in)
- Position: Right-back

Youth career
- Rayo Vallecano

Senior career*
Years	Team	Apps	(Gls)
2004–2005	Rayo Vallecano B		
2005–2011	Rayo Vallecano	180	(20)
2011–2016	Sevilla	117	(9)
2016–2018	Schalke 04	9	(1)
2018	→ Levante (loan)	17	(3)
2018–2022	Levante	67	(6)
2022–2023	Ibiza	23	(2)
2023–2024	Atlético Sanluqueño	29	(1)
Total		442	(42)

International career
2002	Spain U16	1	(0)
- * Club domestic league appearances and goals

Jorge Andújar Moreno (Spanish pronunciation: [ˈxoɾxe anˈduxaɾ moˈɾeno]; born 26 April 1987), known as Coke ([ˈkoke]), is a Spanish former professional footballer who played as a right-back.

He began his career at Rayo Vallecano, who he helped rise from Segunda División B into La Liga, totalling 204 official games. In 2011 he joined Sevilla, with whom he won the Europa League three times and made 173 appearances in all competitions.

== Club career ==
=== Rayo Vallecano ===
Born in Madrid, Coke was a product of Rayo Vallecano's youth system, being promoted to the main squad for the 2005–06 season at only 18, with the capital club in the Segunda División B. He helped it achieve promotion in his third year, and played 33 matches the following campaign as the team overachieved for a final fifth place (scoring three goals in as many wins, including the game's only at home against Hércules CF on 7 February 2009).

Coke only missed 11 league games out of 84 the next two Segunda División seasons and scored 12 goals, with Rayo achieving promotion to La Liga by finishing second in 2011.

=== Sevilla ===
In early June 2011, Coke signed with fellow top-flight club Sevilla FC, penning a four-year contract. He made his top flight debut on 28 August, coming on for Fernando Navarro at half-time of the 2–1 home win against nearby Málaga CF. He finished his first year with 32 appearances in all competitions.

Coke scored his first league goal with the Andalusians on 17 March 2013, grabbing a brace in a 4–0 home rout of Real Zaragoza. On 14 May of the following year, he played the full 120 minutes and converted his penalty shootout attempt in the final of the UEFA Europa League against S.L. Benfica, as Sevilla went on to win the trophy.

After the departure of Ivan Rakitić to FC Barcelona, Coke captained the team in the 2014 UEFA Super Cup on 12 August, a 2–0 defeat to Real Madrid at Cardiff City Stadium. He featured less throughout the season as new signing Aleix Vidal was reconverted to right-back by coach Unai Emery, but played 32 minutes as they retained their Europa League crown with a 3–2 victory over FC Dnipro on 27 May 2015.

On the final day of the 2015–16 campaign, Coke was the first of three players sent off in a 3–1 loss at Athletic Bilbao, being shown a red card for dissent despite not leaving the substitutes' bench. On 18 May 2016, in the Europa League final, he started as right midfielder in place of the injured Michael Krohn-Dehli and scored twice in a 3–1 defeat of Liverpool in Basel, being subsequently named Player of the match.

=== Schalke 04 ===
On 31 July 2016, Coke signed for German club FC Schalke 04 on a three-year contract for a reported €5 million. During a friendly with Bologna FC 1909 held the following week, he suffered a severe cruciate ligament injury to his right knee.

Coke finally made his Bundesliga debut on 1 April 2017, starting in a 1–1 home draw with Borussia Dortmund in the Revierderby. He scored his only goal for the Gelsenkirchen club 15 days later, equalising in a 2–1 loss at Darmstadt 98.

=== Levante ===
On 16 December 2017, struggling with injury problems and lack of playing time, Coke returned to Spain and joined Levante UD on loan until the following 30 June. Subsequently, the move was made permanent on a four-year deal for an undisclosed fee estimated around €1.5 million. He was sent off on 2 September 2018 in a 2–2 home draw with city rivals Valencia CF.

=== Later career ===
On 1 September 2022, free agent Coke agreed to a one-year contract at UD Ibiza. In August of the following year, after their second-tier relegation, he moved to Atlético Sanluqueño CF of Primera Federación; he was already part of the club since March 2022, as investor alongside his former Sevilla teammate Cala.

== Career statistics ==
As of match played 12 May 2019

Appearances and goals by club, season and competition
Club	Season	League			Cup		Europe		Other		Total	
Club	Season	Division	Apps	Goals	Apps	Goals	Apps	Goals	Apps	Goals	Apps	Goals
Rayo Vallecano	2005–06	Segunda División B	26	2	3	0	—		—		29	2
Rayo Vallecano	2006–07	Segunda División B	34	2	5	0	—		4 (Note: Appearances in Segunda División B play-offs)	0	43	2
Rayo Vallecano	2007–08	Segunda División B	14	1	2	0	—		3	0	19	1
Rayo Vallecano	2008–09	Segunda División	33	3	3	1	—		—		36	4
Rayo Vallecano	2009–10	Segunda División	35	7	3	0	—		—		38	7
Rayo Vallecano	2010–11	Segunda División	38	5	1	1	—		—		36	6
Rayo Vallecano	Total		180	20	17	2	—		7	0	204	22
Sevilla	2011–12	La Liga	28	0	2	0	2 (Note: Appearances in UEFA Europa League)	0	—		32	0
Sevilla	2012–13	La Liga	21	3	6	0	—		—		27	3
Sevilla	2013–14	La Liga	25	3	1	0	12	2	—		38	5
Sevilla	2014–15	La Liga	22	2	3	0	8	0	1 (Note: Appearance in UEFA Super Cup)	0	34	2
Sevilla	2015–16	La Liga	21	1	7	2	13 (Note: Appearances in UEFA Champions League and UEFA Europa League)	2	1	0	42	5
Sevilla	Total		117	9	19	2	35	4	2	0	173	15
Schalke 04	2016–17	Bundesliga	8	1	0	0	0	0	—		8	1
Schalke 04	2017–18	Bundesliga	1	0	1	0	—		—		2	0
Schalke 04	Total		9	1	1	0	0	0	0	0	10	1
Levante	2017–18	La Liga	17	3	1	0	—		—		18	3
Levante	2018–19	La Liga	27	4	3	1	—		—		30	5
Levante	Total		44	7	4	1	—		—		48	8
Career total			350	37	41	5	35	4	9	0	435	46

== Honours ==
Rayo Vallecano

- Segunda División B: 2007–08

Sevilla

- UEFA Europa League: 2013–14, 2014–15, 2015–16
- Copa del Rey runner-up: 2015–16
- UEFA Super Cup runner-up: 2014, 2015
