= Copa Sudamericana =

South American football tournament

CONMEBOL Sudamericana
- Organizer(s): CONMEBOL
- Founded: 2002; 24 years ago
- Region: South America
- Teams: 56 (from 10 associations)
- Qualifier for: Recopa Sudamericana; Copa Libertadores; UEFA–CONMEBOL Club Challenge
- Related competitions: Copa Libertadores (1st tier)
- Current champion: (Argentina) Boca Juniors (3rd title)
- Most championships: (Argentina) Boca Juniors (3 titles)
- Broadcasters: List of broadcasters
- Motto: The Great Conquest (La Gran Conquista)
- Website: conmebolsudamericana.com
- 2026 Copa Sudamericana

The CONMEBOL Sudamericana (Portuguese: CONMEBOL Sul-Americana), also known as Copa Sudamericana (Spanish pronunciation: [ˈkopa suðameɾiˈkana]; Portuguese: Copa Sul-Americana [ˈkɔpɐ ˈsulɐmeɾiˈkɐnɐ]; transl. South American Cup), is an annual international club football competition organized by CONMEBOL, the governing body of football in South America, since 2002. It is the second-most prestigious club competition in South American football. CONCACAF clubs were invited between 2005 and 2008. The CONMEBOL Sudamericana began in 2002, replacing the separate competitions Copa Merconorte and Copa Mercosur (that had replaced Copa CONMEBOL) by a single competition. Since its introduction, the competition has been a pure elimination tournament with the number of rounds and teams varying from year to year.

The CONMEBOL Sudamericana is considered a merger of defunct tournaments such as the Copa CONMEBOL, Copa Mercosur and Copa Merconorte. The winner of the Copa Sudamericana becomes eligible to play in the Recopa Sudamericana, the South American supercup. They gain entry to the next edition of the Copa Libertadores, South America's premier club competition, and also contest the UEFA–CONMEBOL Club Challenge, a friendly cup against the winners of the UEFA Europa League. Previously they also competed in the J.League Cup / Copa Sudamericana Championship against the winner of the Japanese League Cup.

The reigning champion of the competition is Argentine club Boca Juniors, who defeated Brazilian club Atlético Mineiro in the most recent final.

The cup has been won by 18 clubs. Argentine clubs have accumulated the most victories with eleven while containing the largest number of winning teams, with eight clubs. Argentine club Boca Juniors is the most successful club in the competition's history, having won the tournament three times and also being the only one to achieve back-to-back victories, in 2004 and 2005.

== History ==
In 1992, the Copa CONMEBOL was an international football tournament created for South American clubs that did not qualify for the Copa Libertadores and Supercopa Sudamericana. This tournament was discontinued in 1999 and replaced by the Copa Merconorte and Copa Mercosur. These tournaments started in 1998 but were discontinued in 2001. A Pan-American club cup competition was intended, under the name of Copa Pan-Americana, but instead, the Copa Sudamericana was introduced in 2002 as a single-elimination tournament with the reigning Copa Mercosur champion, San Lorenzo.

== Format ==
Until 2016 the tournament comprised 47 teams in a knockout format, with the Argentine and Brazilian teams getting byes to the second round and the defending champions entering the competition in the round of 16. Starting from the 2017 edition, the tournament implemented the following format changes:

- The tournament was expanded from 47 to 54 teams.
- A total of 44 teams would directly enter the Copa Sudamericana, while a total of 10 teams eliminated from the Copa Libertadores (two best teams eliminated in the third stage of qualifying and eight third-placed teams in the group stage) would be transferred to the Copa Sudamericana, entering the competition in the second stage.
- The schedule of the tournament was extended to year-round so it would start in February and conclude in December.
- As the Copa Libertadores and the Copa Sudamericana would be held concurrently, no team would be able to qualify for both tournaments in the same year (except those which were transferred from the Copa Libertadores to the Copa Sudamericana).
- The Copa Sudamericana champions would no longer directly qualify for the next edition as they would now directly qualify for the group stage of the Copa Libertadores (although they would still be able to defend their title if they finished third in the group stage).
- Brazil would be allocated six berths, decreased from eight.
- All teams directly entering the Copa Sudamericana would enter the first stage.

The competition's format was further altered ahead of the 2021 edition, in which a group stage was introduced replacing the second stage and the six qualifiers from Argentina and Brazil were given byes to that stage, with the teams from the remaining associations being drawn against a team from their same country in the first stage, ensuring that at least two teams from each association would take part in the group stage. The competition was further expanded to include all four teams eliminated from the Copa Libertadores third stage, which would also enter the group stage, while the eight third-placed teams from the Copa Libertadores group stage would enter the round of 16. Two years later, the format for the first stage of the tournament was changed from double-legged ties to single-match ones and a knockout round prior to the round of 16 was introduced, in which the eight teams transferred from the Copa Libertadores group stage would play against the Copa Sudamericana group runners-up with the winners joining the group winners in the following stage of the competition.

== Trophy ==
The tournament shares its name with the trophy, also called the Copa Sudamericana or simply la Sudamericana, which is awarded to the Copa Sudamericana winner.

== La Otra Mitad de La Gloria ==
La Otra Mitad de La Gloria (The other half of glory) is a promotional Spanish phrase used in the context of winning or attempting to win the Copa Sudamericana. It is a term widely used by Spanish-speaking media. The tournament itself has become highly regarded among its participants since its inception. In 2003, Cienciano's conquest of the trophy ignited a party across Peru. The Mexican football federation regards Pachuca's victory in 2006 as the most important title won by any Mexican club.

== Sponsorship ==
Like the Copa Libertadores, the Copa Sudamericana was sponsored by a group of multinational corporations. Like the premier South American club football tournament forementioned, the competition used a single, main sponsor. The first major sponsor was Nissan Motors, who signed an eight-year contract with CONMEBOL in 2003.

Individual clubs may wear jerseys with advertising, even if such sponsors conflict with those of the Copa Sudamericana.

As of 2024, the sponsors of Copa Sudamericana are:

Official sponsors

- Amstel Brewery
- Coca-Cola
  - Powerade
- Entain
  - Bwin (Except Brazil)
  - Sportingbet (Brazil only)
- EA Sports
- Mercado Libre
- Midea Group
- MG Motor
- Ueno Bank
- World

Official partners

- Avianca
- Absolut Sport
- DHL
- Puma
- Puma Energy
- Rexona

Official licensee

- Panini Group

== Match ball ==
German company Puma supplies the official match ball from 2024, as they do for all other CONMEBOL competitions. This partnership ended CONMEBOL's 20-year tenure with Nike.

Puma Cumbre was the official match ball of the 2024 edition of both the Copa Sudamericana and Copa Libertadores.

== Prize money ==
For the 2023 Copa Sudamericana, clubs playing their first stage match at home received US$225,000, while teams that played their first stage match away receive US$250,000. Clubs qualifying for the group stage were awarded US$900,000, earning US$100,000 per match won in that stage. Those amounts were derived from television rights and stadium advertising. In addition to those amounts, CONMEBOL paid US$500,000 to the clubs reaching the knockout round play-offs, US$550,000 to those advancing to the round of 16, US$600,000 for reaching the quarter-finals, US$800,000 for reaching the semi-finals, US$2,000,000 to the runners-up and US$5,000,000 to the winners.

== Media coverage ==
Starting from 2019, the CONMEBOL Libertadores and Sudamericana broadcast packages were separated, and DirecTV through its sports channel DSports (Latin America excluding Brazil) and DAZN (Brazil) took over the Copa and Recopa Sudamericana coverage from the previous broadcaster, Fox Sports (Latin America), in a deal until 2022. RedeTV! (Brazil) would also broadcast the tournament. On 12 May 2022, CONMEBOL announced the renewal of the agreement with DirecTV for the 2023–2026 cycle, whilst the rights for Brazil were awarded to SBT, ESPN, and Paramount, with OneFootball being awarded rights to broadcast highlights in Brazil as well as the rest of Latin America.

=== Broadcasting rights ===
Region	Broadcaster	Language
Bolivia	ESPN; Tigo Sports	Spanish
Brazil	ESPN; SBT	Portuguese
Canada	beIN Sports	English/Spanish
Argentina	ESPN	Spanish
Chile	ESPN	Spanish
Colombia	ESPN	Spanish
Costa Rica	ESPN	Spanish
Dominican Republic	ESPN	Spanish
Ecuador	ESPN	Spanish
El Salvador	ESPN	Spanish
Guatemala	ESPN	Spanish
Honduras	ESPN	Spanish
Mexico	ESPN	Spanish
Nicaragua	ESPN	Spanish
Panama	ESPN	Spanish
Paraguay	ESPN; Tigo Sports	Spanish
Peru	ESPN	Spanish
Uruguay	ESPN	Spanish
Venezuela	ESPN	Spanish
United States	beIN Sports	Spanish/English

== Records and statistics ==
=== List of finals ===
- From 2005 to 2008, clubs from the CONCACAF were invited to participate.
- From 2019, the final was played under a single match.

Keys

- Finals won on away goals
- Match went to extra time
- Defined on penalty shoot-out in the second leg

Ed.	Year	Winners	1st. leg	2nd. leg	Agg.	Runners-up	Venue (1st leg)	City (1st leg)	Venue (2nd leg)	City (2nd leg)
1	2002	(Argentina) San Lorenzo	4–0	0–0	4–0	(Colombia) Atlético Nacional	Estadio Atanasio Girardot	Medellín	Estadio Pedro Bidegain	Buenos Aires
2	2003	(Peru) Cienciano	3–3	1–0	4–3	(Argentina) River Plate	Estadio Antonio V. Liberti	Buenos Aires	Estadio de la UNSA	Arequipa
3	2004	(Argentina) Boca Juniors	0–1	2–0	2–1	(Bolivia) Bolívar	Estadio Hernando Siles	La Paz	La Bombonera	Buenos Aires
4	2005	(Argentina) Boca Juniors	1–1	1–1	4–3 (p)	(Mexico) Pumas UNAM	Estadio Olímpico Universitario	Mexico City	La Bombonera	Buenos Aires
5	2006	(Mexico) Pachuca	1–1	2–1	3–2	(Chile) Colo-Colo	Estadio Hidalgo	Pachuca	Estadio Nacional	Santiago
6	2007	(Argentina) Arsenal	3–2	1–2	4–4	(Mexico) América	Estadio Azteca	Mexico City	El Cilindro	Avellaneda
7	2008	(Brazil) Internacional	1–0	1–1	2–1	(Argentina) Estudiantes	Estadio Ciudad de La Plata	La Plata	Estádio Beira-Rio	Porto Alegre
8	2009	(Ecuador) LDU Quito	5–1	0–3	5–4	(Brazil) Fluminense	Estadio Casa Blanca	Quito	Maracanã	Rio de Janeiro
9	2010	(Argentina) Independiente	0–2	3–1	5–3 (p)	(Brazil) Goiás	Estádio Serra Dourada	Goiânia	Estadio Libertadores de América	Avellaneda
10	2011	Universidad de Chile	1–0	3–0	4–0	(Ecuador) LDU Quito	Estadio Casa Blanca	Quito	Estadio Nacional	Santiago
11	2012	(Brazil) São Paulo	0–0	2–0	2–0	(Argentina) Tigre	La Bombonera	Buenos Aires	Estádio do Morumbi	São Paulo
12	2013	(Argentina) Lanús	1–1	2–0	3–1	(Brazil) Ponte Preta	Estádio do Pacaembu	São Paulo	Estadio Ciudad de Lanús	Lanús
13	2014	(Argentina) River Plate	1–1	2–0	3–1	(Colombia) Atlético Nacional	Estadio Atanasio Girardot	Medellín	Estadio Antonio V. Liberti	Buenos Aires
14	2015	(Colombia) Santa Fe	0–0	0–0	3–1 (p)	(Argentina) Huracán	Estadio Tomás Adolfo Ducó	Buenos Aires	Estadio El Campín	Bogotá
15	2016	(Brazil) Chapecoense	(Note: The 2016 final was cancelled due to the crash of LaMia Flight 2933. CONMEBOL awarded the title to Chapecoense, following a request by Atlético Nacional.)			(Colombia) Atlético Nacional	Estadio Atanasio Girardot	Medellín	Estádio Couto Pereira	Curitiba
16	2017	(Argentina) Independiente	2–1	1–1	3–2	(Brazil) Flamengo	Estadio Libertadores de América	Avellaneda	Maracanã	Rio de Janeiro
17	2018	(Brazil) Athletico Paranaense	1–1	1–1	4–3 (p)	(Colombia) Junior	Estadio Metropolitano	Barranquilla	Arena da Baixada	Curitiba
18	2019	(Ecuador) Independiente del Valle	3–1			(Argentina) Colón	Estadio General Pablo Rojas	Asunción	—	
19	2020	(Argentina) Defensa y Justicia	3–0			(Argentina) Lanús	Estadio Mario Alberto Kempes	Córdoba	—	
20	2021	(Brazil) Athletico Paranaense	1–0			(Brazil) Red Bull Bragantino	Estadio Centenario	Montevideo	—	
21	2022	(Ecuador) Independiente del Valle	2–0			(Brazil) São Paulo	Estadio Mario Alberto Kempes	Córdoba	—	
22	2023	(Ecuador) LDU Quito	1–1 (4–3 p)			(Brazil) Fortaleza	Estadio Domingo Burgueño	Maldonado	—	
23	2024	(Argentina) Racing	3–1			(Brazil) Cruzeiro	Estadio General Pablo Rojas	Asunción	—	
24	2025	(Argentina) Lanús	0–0 (5–4 p)			(Brazil) Atlético Mineiro	Estadio Defensores del Chaco	Asunción	—	
25	2026	(Argentina) Boca Juniors	2–0			(Brazil) Atlético Mineiro	Estadio Metropolitano Roberto Meléndez	Barranquilla	—	

== Performance by club ==
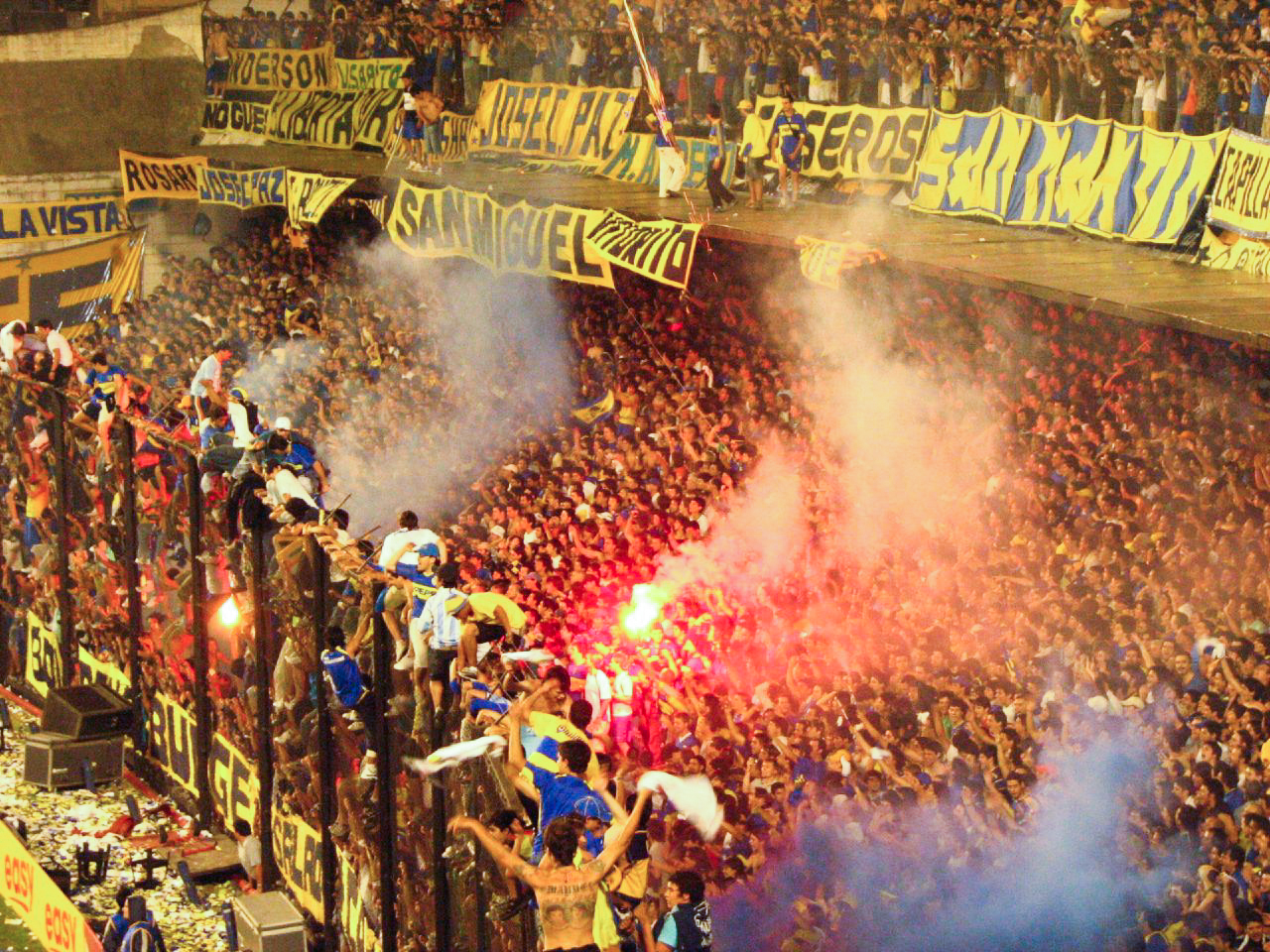
Boca Juniors is the most successful clubs with three titles won

Performance in Copa Sudamericana by club
Club	Titles	Runners-up	Seasons won	Seasons runner-up
(Argentina) Boca Juniors	3	—	2004, 2005, 2026	—
(Ecuador) LDU Quito	2	1	2009, 2023	2011
(Argentina) Lanús	2	1	2013, 2025	2020
(Argentina) Independiente	2	—	2010, 2017	—
(Brazil) Athletico Paranaense	2	—	2018, 2021	—
(Ecuador) Independiente del Valle	2	—	2019, 2022	—
(Brazil) São Paulo	1	1	2012	2022
(Argentina) River Plate	1	1	2014	2003
(Argentina) San Lorenzo	1	—	2002	—
(Peru) Cienciano	1	—	2003	—
(Mexico) Pachuca	1	—	2006	—
(Argentina) Arsenal	1	—	2007	—
(Brazil) Internacional	1	—	2008	—
Universidad de Chile	1	—	2011	—
(Colombia) Santa Fe	1	—	2015	—
(Brazil) Chapecoense	1	—	2016	—
(Argentina) Defensa y Justicia	1	—	2020	—
(Argentina) Racing	1	—	2024	—
(Colombia) Atlético Nacional	0	3	—	2002, 2014, 2016
(Brazil) Atlético Mineiro	0	2	—	2025, 2026
(Bolivia) Bolívar	0	1	—	2004
(Mexico) Pumas UNAM	0	1	—	2005
(Chile) Colo-Colo	0	1	—	2006
(Mexico) América	0	1	—	2007
(Argentina) Estudiantes	0	1	—	2008
(Brazil) Fluminense	0	1	—	2009
(Brazil) Goiás	0	1	—	2010
(Argentina) Tigre	0	1	—	2012
(Brazil) Ponte Preta	0	1	—	2013
(Argentina) Huracán	0	1	—	2015
(Brazil) Flamengo	0	1	—	2017
(Colombia) Junior	0	1	—	2018
(Argentina) Colón	0	1	—	2019
(Brazil) Red Bull Bragantino	0	1	—	2021
(Brazil) Fortaleza	0	1	—	2023
(Brazil) Cruzeiro	0	1	—	2024

=== Performance by nation ===
Performance in Copa Sudamericana by nation
Nation	Titles	Runners-up	Total
Argentina	12	6	18
Brazil	5	10	15
Ecuador	4	1	5
Colombia	1	4	5
Mexico	1	2	3
Chile	1	1	2
Peru	1	0	1
Bolivia	0	1	1
Costa Rica	0	0	0
Honduras	0	0	0
Paraguay	0	0	0
United States	0	0	0
Uruguay	0	0	0
Venezuela	0	0	0

== Other statistics ==
Claudio Morel Rodríguez has won a record three Copa Sudamericana medals

Claudio Morel Rodríguez is the only player to have won three Copa Sudamericana winners' medals.

As of the end of the 2014 tournament, LDU Quito and São Paulo have played most games in the tournament (50).

== See also ==
- AFC Champions League Two – Asian equivalent
- UEFA Europa League – European equivalent
- CAF Confederation Cup – African equivalent
- List of association football competitions
