= 2022 Copa Sudamericana group stage =

Football tournament group stage

The 2022 Copa Sudamericana group stage was played from 5 April to 26 May 2022. A total of 32 teams competed in the group stage to decide eight of the 16 places in the final stages of the 2022 Copa Sudamericana.

== Draw ==
The draw for the group stage was held on 25 March 2022, 12:00 PYST (UTC−3), at the CONMEBOL Convention Centre in Luque, Paraguay.

Teams were seeded by their CONMEBOL Clubs ranking as of 16 December 2021 (shown in parentheses), taking into account the following three factors:

1. Performance in the last 10 years, taking into account Copa Libertadores and Copa Sudamericana results in the period 2012–2021.
2. Historical coefficient, taking into account Copa Libertadores and Copa Sudamericana results in the period 1960–2011 and 2002–2011 respectively.
3. Local tournament champion, with bonus points awarded to domestic league champions of the last 10 years.

For the group stage, the 32 teams were drawn into eight groups (Groups A–H) of four containing a team from each of the four pots. Teams from the same association could not be drawn into the same group.

Group stage draw
Pot 1	Pot 2	Pot 3	Pot 4
(Brazil) Santos (8); (Argentina) Independiente (10); (Brazil) São Paulo (13); (Brazil) Internacional (17); (Argentina) Racing (19); (Ecuador) LDU Quito (20); (Argentina) Lanús (24); (Colombia) Junior (25)	(Argentina) Defensa y Justicia (36); (Bolivia) Jorge Wilstermann (39); (Colombia) Independiente Medellín (55); (Peru) Melgar (66); (Uruguay) Montevideo Wanderers (73); (Bolivia) Oriente Petrolero (84); (Venezuela) Deportivo La Guaira (89); (Chile) Unión La Calera (91)	(Uruguay) River Plate (95); (Brazil) Atlético Goianiense (100); (Brazil) Ceará (107); (Argentina) Banfield (113); (Venezuela) Metropolitanos (131); (Argentina) Unión (142); (Peru) Ayacucho (190); (Ecuador) 9 de Octubre (191)	(Chile) Deportes Antofagasta (197); (Paraguay) Guaireña (223); (Brazil) Cuiabá (253); (Paraguay) General Caballero (JLM) (No rank); (Brazil) Fluminense (30); (Chile) Everton (165); (Ecuador) Universidad Católica (120); (Ecuador) Barcelona (18)

Notes

1. ^{CLQ3} The Copa Libertadores third stage losers were seeded in Pot 4.

The following are the four losers of the third stage of the 2022 Copa Libertadores qualifying stages which joined the 12 direct entrants and the 16 Copa Sudamericana first stage winners in the group stage.

Match	Third stage losers
G1	(Brazil) Fluminense
G2	(Chile) Everton
G3	(Ecuador) Universidad Católica
G4	(Ecuador) Barcelona

== Format ==
In the group stage, each group was played on a home-and-away round-robin basis. The teams were ranked according to the following criteria: 1. Points (3 points for a win, 1 point for a draw, and 0 points for a loss); 2. Goal difference; 3. Goals scored; 4. Away goals scored; 5. CONMEBOL ranking (Regulations Article 2.4.2).

The winners of each group advanced to the round of 16 of the final stages.

== Schedule ==
The schedule of each matchday was as follows (Regulations Article 2.2.2):

Matchday	Dates	Matches
Matchday 1	5–7 April 2022	Team 4 vs. Team 2, Team 3 vs. Team 1
Matchday 2	12–14 April 2022	Team 2 vs. Team 3, Team 1 vs. Team 4
Matchday 3	26–28 April 2022	Team 2 vs. Team 1, Team 4 vs. Team 3
Matchday 4	3–5 May 2022	Team 3 vs. Team 2, Team 4 vs. Team 1
Matchday 5	17–19 May 2022	Team 1 vs. Team 2, Team 3 vs. Team 4
Matchday 6	24–26 May 2022	Team 1 vs. Team 3, Team 2 vs. Team 4

== Groups ==
=== Group A ===
Pos	Team	Pld	W	D	L	GF	GA	GD	Pts	Qualification	LAN	BSC	WAN	MET
1	(Argentina) Lanús	6	3	2	1	7	4	+3	11	Round of 16	—	3–1	1–2	1–0
2	(Ecuador) Barcelona	6	2	3	1	9	8	+1	9		1–1	—	4–2	1–0
3	(Uruguay) Montevideo Wanderers	6	2	2	2	6	7	−1	8		0–1	0–0	—	1–1
4	(Venezuela) Metropolitanos	6	0	3	3	3	6	−3	3		0–0	2–2	0–1	—

Source: CONMEBOL
7 April 2022
19:30 UTC−5

Barcelona (Ecuador)	4–2	(Uruguay) Montevideo Wanderers
Mastriani 9', 11'; Carcelén 35'; Díaz 54'	Report	Rivero 14'; Méndez 61'

Estadio Monumental Isidro Romero Carbo, Guayaquil
Attendance: 12,069
Referee: Mario Díaz de Vivar (Paraguay)
7 April 2022
20:30 UTC−4

Metropolitanos (Venezuela)	0–0	(Argentina) Lanús
	Report

Estadio Olímpico de la UCV, Caracas
Attendance: 807
Referee: Flávio de Souza (Brazil)

14 April 2022
19:15 UTC−3

Montevideo Wanderers (Uruguay)	1–1	(Venezuela) Metropolitanos
Méndez 45+1'	Report	Flores 43' (pen.)

Estadio Centenario, Montevideo (Note: Montevideo Wanderers played their home matches at Estadio Centenario, Montevideo instead of their regular stadium Parque Alfredo Víctor Viera, Montevideo.)
Referee: Bráulio Machado (Brazil)
14 April 2022
21:30 UTC−3

Lanús (Argentina)	3–1	(Ecuador) Barcelona
Cabral 31'; Sand 74'; Bernabei 82'	Report	Rodríguez 77'

Estadio Ciudad de Lanús, Lanús
Attendance: 3,592
Referee: Bruno Arleu (Brazil)

28 April 2022
21:30 UTC−3

Montevideo Wanderers (Uruguay)	0–1	(Argentina) Lanús
	Report	Sand 79'

Estadio Centenario, Montevideo
Referee: Wilton Sampaio (Brazil)
28 April 2022
19:30 UTC−5

Barcelona (Ecuador)	1–0	(Venezuela) Metropolitanos
Molina 33'	Report

Estadio Monumental Isidro Romero Carbo, Guayaquil
Referee: Anderson Daronco (Brazil)

4 May 2022
18:15 UTC−4

Metropolitanos (Venezuela)	0–1	(Uruguay) Montevideo Wanderers
	Report	Méndez 45+1'

Estadio Olímpico de la UCV, Caracas
Referee: Savio Pereira (Brazil)
4 May 2022
19:30 UTC−5

Barcelona (Ecuador)	1–1	(Argentina) Lanús
Sand 41' (o.g.)	Report	Sand 53'

Estadio Monumental Isidro Romero Carbo, Guayaquil
Referee: Piero Maza (Chile)

19 May 2022
21:30 UTC−3

Lanús (Argentina)	1–2	(Uruguay) Montevideo Wanderers
Bernabei 84'	Report	Méndez 87'; Bravo 90+2'

Estadio Ciudad de Lanús, Lanús
Attendance: 3,758
Referee: Flávio de Souza (Brazil)
19 May 2022
20:30 UTC−4

Metropolitanos (Venezuela)	2–2	(Ecuador) Barcelona
Gómez 35'; Antón 78'	Report	Díaz 45+4' (pen.); Garcés 52'

Estadio Olímpico de la UCV, Caracas
Referee: Rodolpho Toski (Brazil)

25 May 2022
19:15 UTC−3

Lanús (Argentina)	1–0	(Venezuela) Metropolitanos
Braghieri 51'	Report

Estadio Ciudad de Lanús, Lanús
Referee: Braulio Machado (Brazil)
25 May 2022
19:15 UTC−3

Montevideo Wanderers (Uruguay)	0–0	(Ecuador) Barcelona
	Report

Estadio Centenario, Montevideo
Referee: Wagner Magalhães (Brazil)

=== Group B ===
Pos	Team	Pld	W	D	L	GF	GA	GD	Pts	Qualification	MEL	RAC	CUI	RIV
1	(Peru) Melgar	6	4	0	2	10	6	+4	12	Round of 16	—	3–1	3–1	2–0
2	(Argentina) Racing	6	4	0	2	7	5	+2	12		1–0	—	2–0	0–1
3	(Brazil) Cuiabá	6	2	0	4	7	10	−3	6		2–0	1–2	—	1–2
4	(Uruguay) River Plate	6	2	0	4	5	8	−3	6		1–2	0–1	1–2	—

Source: CONMEBOL
7 April 2022
18:15 UTC−4

Cuiabá (Brazil)	2–0	(Peru) Melgar
Élton 78', 90+5'	Report

Arena Pantanal, Cuiabá
Attendance: 8,573
Referee: Ivo Méndez (Bolivia)
7 April 2022
19:15 UTC−3

River Plate (Uruguay)	0–1	(Argentina) Racing
	Report	Miranda 90+1'

Estadio Centenario, Montevideo (Note: River Plate played their home matches at Estadio Centenario, Montevideo instead of their regular stadium Parque Federico Omar Saroldi, Montevideo which did not meet CONMEBOL requirements.)
Attendance: 2,717
Referee: Guillermo Guerrero (Ecuador)

13 April 2022
17:15 UTC−5

Melgar (Peru)	2–0	(Uruguay) River Plate
Cuesta 3', 78'	Report

Estadio Monumental de la UNSA, Arequipa
Attendance: 4,231
Referee: Franklin Congo (Ecuador)
13 April 2022
19:15 UTC−3 (Note: The Racing v Cuiabá match, originally scheduled for 13 April 2022, 21:30 local time, was re-scheduled to 19:15 local time.)

Racing (Argentina)	2–0	(Brazil) Cuiabá
Correa 27'; João Carlos 65' (o.g.)	Report

Estadio Presidente Juan Domingo Perón, Avellaneda
Referee: Mario Díaz de Vivar (Paraguay)

27 April 2022
17:15 UTC−5

Melgar (Peru)	3–1	(Argentina) Racing
Iberico 21', 52'; Cuesta 73'	Report	Correa 87'

Estadio Monumental de la UNSA, Arequipa
Attendance: 11,997
Referee: Dilio Rodríguez (Bolivia)
27 April 2022
18:15 UTC−4

Cuiabá (Brazil)	1–2	(Uruguay) River Plate
Marquinhos 48'	Report	Salaberry 15'; López 45+1'

Arena Pantanal, Cuiabá
Referee: Cristian Garay (Chile)

3 May 2022
19:15 UTC−3

River Plate (Uruguay)	1–2	(Peru) Melgar
Lavega 90+3'	Report	Cuesta 22'; Archimbaud 90+5'

Estadio Centenario, Montevideo
Referee: Carlos Benítez (Paraguay)
3 May 2022
18:15 UTC−4

Cuiabá (Brazil)	1–2	(Argentina) Racing
Marllon 29'	Report	Moreno 47'; Copetti 59'

Arena Pantanal, Cuiabá
Referee: Guillermo Guerrero (Ecuador)

18 May 2022
19:15 UTC−3

River Plate (Uruguay)	1–2	(Brazil) Cuiabá
Clar 90+6'	Report	André Luis 43', 90'

Estadio Centenario, Montevideo
Referee: Alex Cajas (Ecuador)
18 May 2022
21:30 UTC−3

Racing (Argentina)	1–0	(Peru) Melgar
Chancalay 44'	Report

Estadio Presidente Juan Domingo Perón, Avellaneda
Referee: Derlis López (Paraguay)

26 May 2022
19:15 UTC−3

Racing (Argentina)	0–1	(Uruguay) River Plate
	Report	Salaberry 66'

Estadio Presidente Juan Domingo Perón, Avellaneda
Referee: Cristian Garay (Chile)
26 May 2022
17:15 UTC−5

Melgar (Peru)	3–1	(Brazil) Cuiabá
Archimbaud 38'; Bordacahar 85', 89'	Report	Gustavo 61'

Estadio Monumental de la UNSA, Arequipa
Referee: Jhon Hinestroza (Colombia)

=== Group C ===
Pos	Team	Pld	W	D	L	GF	GA	GD	Pts	Qualification	SAN	ULC	UCA	BAN
1	(Brazil) Santos	6	3	2	1	7	5	+2	11	Round of 16	—	1–0	3–2	1–1
2	(Chile) Unión La Calera	6	3	2	1	6	4	+2	11		1–1	—	3–2	1–0
3	(Ecuador) Universidad Católica	6	1	2	3	7	8	−1	5		0–1	0–0	—	2–0
4	(Argentina) Banfield	6	1	2	3	3	6	−3	5		1–0	0–1	1–1	—

Source: CONMEBOL
5 April 2022
17:15 UTC−5

Universidad Católica (Ecuador)	0–0	(Chile) Unión La Calera
	Report

Estadio Olímpico Atahualpa, Quito
Referee: Juan López (Paraguay)
5 April 2022
19:15 UTC−3

Banfield (Argentina)	1–0	(Brazil) Santos
Urzi 44'	Report

Estadio Florencio Sola, Banfield
Attendance: 7,291
Referee: Derlis López (Paraguay)

13 April 2022
19:15 UTC−3

Santos (Brazil)	3–2	(Ecuador) Universidad Católica
Julio 15'; Léo Baptistão 78' (pen.); Angulo 85'	Report	Martínez Borja 26'; Minda 42'

Estádio Urbano Caldeira, Santos
Attendance: 9,224
Referee: José Argote (Venezuela)
14 April 2022
18:15 UTC−4

Unión La Calera (Chile)	1–0	(Argentina) Banfield
Sáez 10'	Report

Estadio Sausalito, Viña del Mar (Note: Unión La Calera played their home matches at Estadio Sausalito, Viña del Mar instead of their regular stadium Estadio Municipal Nicolás Chahuán Nazar, La Calera which did not meet CONMEBOL requirements.)
Referee: Juan Benítez (Paraguay)

27 April 2022
19:30 UTC−5

Universidad Católica (Ecuador)	2–0	(Argentina) Banfield
Díaz 51'; Martínez Borja 54'	Report

Estadio Olímpico Atahualpa, Quito
Attendance: 3,827
Referee: Augusto Menéndez (Peru)
28 April 2022
20:30 UTC−4

Unión La Calera (Chile)	1–1	(Brazil) Santos
Valencia 25'	Report	Angulo 10'

Estadio Sausalito, Viña del Mar
Referee: Ángel Arteaga (Venezuela)

5 May 2022
21:30 UTC−3

Banfield (Argentina)	0–1	(Chile) Unión La Calera
	Report	Sáez 76'

Estadio Florencio Sola, Banfield
Referee: Carlos Ortega (Colombia)
5 May 2022
19:30 UTC−5

Universidad Católica (Ecuador)	0–1	(Brazil) Santos
	Report	Rwan 90+1'

Estadio Olímpico Atahualpa, Quito
Referee: Gery Vargas (Bolivia)

17 May 2022
19:15 UTC−3

Banfield (Argentina)	1–1	(Ecuador) Universidad Católica
Dátolo 82'	Report	Díaz 90+2'

Estadio Florencio Sola, Banfield
Referee: Michael Espinoza (Peru)
18 May 2022
21:30 UTC−3

Santos (Brazil)	1–0	(Chile) Unión La Calera
Lucas Barbosa 90+12'	Report

Estádio Urbano Caldeira, Santos
Attendance: 11,110
Referee: Jesús Valenzuela (Venezuela)

24 May 2022
19:15 UTC−3

Santos (Brazil)	1–1	(Argentina) Banfield
Marcos Leonardo 37' (pen.)	Report	Domingo 45+1'

Estádio Urbano Caldeira, Santos
Referee: Augusto Menéndez (Peru)
24 May 2022
18:15 UTC−4

Unión La Calera (Chile)	3–2	(Ecuador) Universidad Católica
Cavalleri 6'; Sáez 28'; Vidangossy 72'	Report	Clavijo 38'; Rivas 88' (pen.)

Estadio Sausalito, Viña del Mar
Referee: Andrés Cunha (Uruguay)

=== Group D ===
Pos	Team	Pld	W	D	L	GF	GA	GD	Pts	Qualification	SPA	EVE	AYA	WIL
1	(Brazil) São Paulo	6	5	1	0	12	3	+9	16	Round of 16	—	2–0	1–0	3–0
2	(Chile) Everton	6	3	2	1	7	4	+3	11		0–0	—	2–1	1–1
3	(Peru) Ayacucho	6	1	1	4	5	8	−3	4		2–3	0–2	—	0–0
4	(Bolivia) Jorge Wilstermann	6	0	2	4	2	11	−9	2		1–3	0–2	0–2	—

Source: CONMEBOL
5 April 2022
20:30 UTC−4

Everton (Chile)	1–1	(Bolivia) Jorge Wilstermann
Di Yorio 47'	Report	Osorio 23' (pen.)

Estadio Sausalito, Viña del Mar
Attendance: 5,361
Referee: Yael Falcón (Argentina)
7 April 2022
19:30 UTC−5

Ayacucho (Peru)	2–3	(Brazil) São Paulo
Barrios 7'; Techera 20'	Report	Arboleda 3'; Miranda 23'; Luciano 88' (pen.)

Estadio Nacional, Lima (Note: The Ayacucho v São Paulo match was played at Estadio Nacional, Lima instead of the originally scheduled Estadio Garcilaso, Cusco.)
Referee: Augusto Aragón (Ecuador)

13 April 2022
20:30 UTC−4

Jorge Wilstermann (Bolivia)	0–2	(Peru) Ayacucho
	Report	Duclós 9'; Techera 78'

Estadio Félix Capriles, Cochabamba
Referee: Alex Cajas (Ecuador)
14 April 2022
19:15 UTC−3

São Paulo (Brazil)	2–0	(Chile) Everton
Arboleda 31'; Talles 86'	Report

Estádio do Morumbi, São Paulo
Attendance: 30,307
Referee: Pablo Echavarría (Argentina)

26 April 2022
20:30 UTC−4

Everton (Chile)	2–1	(Peru) Ayacucho
Echeverría 55', 71'	Report	Techera 61' (pen.)

Estadio Sausalito, Viña del Mar
Referee: Facundo Tello (Argentina)
28 April 2022
18:15 UTC−4

Jorge Wilstermann (Bolivia)	1–3	(Brazil) São Paulo
Osorio 31' (pen.)	Report	Igor Gomes 23'; Reinaldo 64' (pen.); Marquinhos 85'

Estadio Félix Capriles, Cochabamba
Referee: Carlos Ortega (Colombia)

5 May 2022
18:15 UTC−4

Everton (Chile)	0–0	(Brazil) São Paulo
	Report

Estadio Sausalito, Viña del Mar
Referee: Fernando Rapallini (Argentina)
5 May 2022
19:30 UTC−5

Ayacucho (Peru)	0–0	(Bolivia) Jorge Wilstermann
	Report

Estadio Garcilaso, Cusco (Note: Ayacucho played their home matches against Jorge Wilstermann and Everton at Estadio Garcilaso, Cusco instead of their regular stadium Estadio Ciudad de Cumaná, Ayacucho which did not meet CONMEBOL requirements.)
Referee: Franklin Congo (Ecuador)

18 May 2022
19:30 UTC−5

Ayacucho (Peru)	0–2	(Chile) Everton
	Report	Di Yorio 58'; Campos López 65'

Estadio Garcilaso, Cusco
Referee: Carlos Ortega (Colombia)
19 May 2022
21:30 UTC−3

São Paulo (Brazil)	3–0	(Bolivia) Jorge Wilstermann
Rodrigo Nestor 6', 17'; Patrick 47'	Report

Estádio do Morumbi, São Paulo
Attendance: 16,675
Referee: Ángel Arteaga (Venezuela)

25 May 2022
19:15 UTC−3

São Paulo (Brazil)	1–0	(Peru) Ayacucho
Caio 72'	Report

Estádio do Morumbi, São Paulo
Referee: Carlos Benítez (Paraguay)
25 May 2022
18:15 UTC−4

Jorge Wilstermann (Bolivia)	0–2	(Chile) Everton
	Report	Sosa 83'; Cuevas 90'

Estadio Félix Capriles, Cochabamba
Referee: Luis Quiroz (Ecuador)

=== Group E ===
Pos	Team	Pld	W	D	L	GF	GA	GD	Pts	Qualification	INT	GUA	DIM	9OC
1	(Brazil) Internacional	6	3	3	0	12	5	+7	12	Round of 16	—	1–1	2–0	5–1
2	(Paraguay) Guaireña	6	2	4	0	10	8	+2	10		1–1	—	3–3	1–0
3	(Colombia) Independiente Medellín	6	1	2	3	8	11	−3	5		0–1	1–1	—	2–1
4	(Ecuador) 9 de Octubre	6	1	1	4	9	15	−6	4		2–2	2–3	3–2	—

Source: CONMEBOL
6 April 2022
19:30 UTC−5

9 de Octubre (Ecuador)	2–2	(Brazil) Internacional
Da Luz 58', 75'	Report	Maurício 25'; Wesley 26'

Estadio Jocay, Manta (Note: 9 de Octubre played their home matches at Estadio Jocay, Manta instead of their regular stadium Estadio Modelo Alberto Spencer, Guayaquil which did not meet CONMEBOL requirements.)
Referee: Andrés Merlos (Argentina)
7 April 2022
20:30 UTC−4

Guaireña (Paraguay)	3–3	(Colombia) Independiente Medellín
Otazú 6'; Ayala 56'; Arboleda 65' (o.g.)	Report	Pons 33'; Arregui 38'; Cuesta 90+1'

Estadio Defensores del Chaco, Asunción (Note: Guaireña played their home matches at Estadio Defensores del Chaco, Asunción instead of their regular stadium Estadio Parque del Guairá, Villarrica which did not meet CONMEBOL requirements.)
Attendance: 968
Referee: Augusto Menéndez (Peru)

14 April 2022
19:30 UTC−5

Independiente Medellín (Colombia)	2–1	(Ecuador) 9 de Octubre
Hernández 9'; Castrillón 90+4'	Report	Lucas 5'

Estadio Atanasio Girardot, Medellín
Attendance: 17,896
Referee: Yender Herrera (Venezuela)
14 April 2022
21:30 UTC−3

Internacional (Brazil)	1–1	(Paraguay) Guaireña
Paniagua 77' (o.g.)	Report	Otazú 41'

Estádio Beira-Rio, Porto Alegre
Attendance: 11,172
Referee: Gery Vargas (Bolivia)

26 April 2022
19:30 UTC−5

Independiente Medellín (Colombia)	0–1	(Brazil) Internacional
	Report	Alemão 54'

Estadio Hernán Ramírez Villegas, Pereira (Note: Independiente Medellín played their home matches against Internacional and Guaireña at Estadio Hernán Ramírez Villegas, Pereira instead of their regular stadium Estadio Atanasio Girardot, Medellín.)
Attendance: 3,932
Referee: Nicolás Lamolina (Argentina)
27 April 2022
18:15 UTC−4

Guaireña (Paraguay)	1–0	(Ecuador) 9 de Octubre
Godoy 90+5' (pen.)	Report

Estadio Defensores del Chaco, Asunción
Attendance: 1,941
Referee: Christian Ferreyra (Uruguay)

3 May 2022
19:30 UTC−5

9 de Octubre (Ecuador)	3–2	(Colombia) Independiente Medellín
Stephens 32', 68' (pen.); Becerra 57'	Report	López 36'; Camargo 65'

Estadio Jocay, Manta
Referee: Ivo Méndez (Bolivia)
5 May 2022
18:15 UTC−4

Guaireña (Paraguay)	1–1	(Brazil) Internacional
Otazú 33' (pen.)	Report	Wanderson 52'

Estadio Defensores del Chaco, Asunción
Referee: Cristian Garay (Chile)

17 May 2022
19:15 UTC−3

Internacional (Brazil)	2–0	(Colombia) Independiente Medellín
Edenílson 19', 57'	Report

Estádio Beira-Rio, Porto Alegre
Referee: Facundo Tello (Argentina)
17 May 2022
19:30 UTC−5

9 de Octubre (Ecuador)	2–3	(Paraguay) Guaireña
Da Luz 7'; Stephens 74'	Report	Otazú 52' (pen.), 62'; Maciel 90+5'

Estadio Jocay, Manta
Referee: Augusto Menéndez (Peru)

24 May 2022
21:30 UTC−3

Internacional (Brazil)	5–1	(Ecuador) 9 de Octubre
Dourado 9', 49', 75'; Quiñónez 66' (o.g.); Estêvão 83'	Report	Caicedo 11'

Estádio Beira-Rio, Porto Alegre
Referee: Yael Falcón (Argentina)
24 May 2022
19:30 UTC−5

Independiente Medellín (Colombia)	1–1	(Paraguay) Guaireña
Cambindo 27'	Report	Duarte 60'

Estadio Hernán Ramírez Villegas, Pereira
Referee: Darío Herrera (Argentina)

=== Group F ===
Pos	Team	Pld	W	D	L	GF	GA	GD	Pts	Qualification	ACG	LDQ	ANT	DYJ
1	(Brazil) Atlético Goianiense	6	4	1	1	11	5	+6	13	Round of 16	—	4–0	1–0	3–2
2	(Ecuador) LDU Quito	6	3	2	1	11	9	+2	11		1–1	—	4–0	2–2
3	(Chile) Deportes Antofagasta	6	2	0	4	6	11	−5	6		2–1	1–2	—	1–3
4	(Argentina) Defensa y Justicia	6	1	1	4	8	11	−3	4		0–1	1–2	0–2	—

Source: CONMEBOL
5 April 2022
21:30 UTC−3

Atlético Goianiense (Brazil)	4–0	(Ecuador) LDU Quito
Jorginho 62'; Shaylon 77'; Hayner 87'; Rickson 90+4'	Report

Estádio Antônio Accioly, Goiânia
Attendance: 4,877
Referee: Gery Vargas (Bolivia)
6 April 2022
20:30 UTC−4

Deportes Antofagasta (Chile)	1–3	(Argentina) Defensa y Justicia
Collao 83'	Report	Bou 10'; Tripichio 29'; Merentiel 57'

Estadio Regional Calvo y Bascuñán, Antofagasta
Referee: Nicolás Gallo (Colombia)

12 April 2022
21:30 UTC−3

Defensa y Justicia (Argentina)	0–1	(Brazil) Atlético Goianiense
	Report	Wellington Rato 9'

Estadio Norberto Tomaghello, Gobernador Costa
Referee: Carlos Betancur (Colombia)
12 April 2022
19:30 UTC−5

LDU Quito (Ecuador)	4–0	(Chile) Deportes Antofagasta
Angulo 47'; Cornejo 50' (o.g.); Molina 77'; Arce 90+2'	Report

Estadio Rodrigo Paz Delgado, Quito
Referee: Augusto Menéndez (Peru)

27 April 2022
20:30 UTC−4

Deportes Antofagasta (Chile)	2–1	(Brazil) Atlético Goianiense
Flores 87' (pen.); López 90'	Report	Gabriel Noga 45+2'

Estadio Regional Calvo y Bascuñán, Antofagasta
Attendance: 1,123
Referee: José Méndez (Paraguay)
28 April 2022
19:15 UTC−3

Defensa y Justicia (Argentina)	1–2	(Ecuador) LDU Quito
Albertengo 82'	Report	Alvarado 55', 87'

Estadio Norberto Tomaghello, Gobernador Costa
Referee: Gery Vargas (Bolivia)

4 May 2022
19:15 UTC−3

Atlético Goianiense (Brazil)	3–2	(Argentina) Defensa y Justicia
Marlon 18' (pen.); Shaylon 46'; Unsain 54' (o.g.)	Report	Fontana 64'; Albertengo 86'

Estádio Antônio Accioly, Goiânia
Referee: Gustavo Tejera (Uruguay)
4 May 2022
18:15 UTC−4

Deportes Antofagasta (Chile)	1–2	(Ecuador) LDU Quito
M. López 18'	Report	Angulo 52'; A. López 67'

Estadio Regional Calvo y Bascuñán, Antofagasta
Referee: Michael Espinoza (Peru)

17 May 2022
21:30 UTC−3

Atlético Goianiense (Brazil)	1–0	(Chile) Deportes Antofagasta
Jorginho 12'	Report

Estádio Antônio Accioly, Goiânia
Referee: Gery Vargas (Bolivia)
18 May 2022
19:30 UTC−5

LDU Quito (Ecuador)	2–2	(Argentina) Defensa y Justicia
Quintero 5'; Angulo 71'	Report	Albertengo 29', 44'

Estadio Rodrigo Paz Delgado, Quito
Referee: Nicolás Gallo (Colombia)

24 May 2022
19:30 UTC−5

LDU Quito (Ecuador)	1–1	(Brazil) Atlético Goianiense
Hoyos 29'	Report	Baralhas 65'

Estadio Rodrigo Paz Delgado, Quito
Referee: Gustavo Tejera (Uruguay)
24 May 2022
21:30 UTC−3

Defensa y Justicia (Argentina)	0–2	(Chile) Deportes Antofagasta
	Report	Hurtado 42'; López 73'

Estadio Norberto Tomaghello, Gobernador Costa
Referee: Mario Díaz de Vivar (Paraguay)

=== Group G ===
Pos	Team	Pld	W	D	L	GF	GA	GD	Pts	Qualification	CEA	IND	GCM	DLG
1	(Brazil) Ceará	6	6	0	0	17	1	+16	18	Round of 16	—	2–1	6–0	3–0
2	(Argentina) Independiente	6	4	0	2	13	4	+9	12		0–2	—	2–0	4–0
3	(Paraguay) General Caballero (JLM)	6	1	1	4	2	15	−13	4		0–2	0–4	—	1–1
4	(Venezuela) Deportivo La Guaira	6	0	1	5	1	13	−12	1		0–2	0–2	0–1	—

Source: CONMEBOL
5 April 2022
19:15 UTC−3

Ceará (Brazil)	2–1	(Argentina) Independiente
Mendoza 61' (pen.); Sosa 66' (o.g.)	Report	Togni 32'

Castelão, Fortaleza
Attendance: 33,864
Referee: Leodán González (Uruguay)
6 April 2022
18:15 UTC−4

General Caballero (JLM) (Paraguay)	1–1	(Venezuela) Deportivo La Guaira
Corulo 35'	Report	Cumana 49'

Estadio Defensores del Chaco, Asunción (Note: General Caballero (JLM) played their home match against Deportivo La Guaira at Estadio Defensores del Chaco, Asunción instead of their regular stadium Estadio Ka'arendy, Dr. Juan León Mallorquín which did not meet CONMEBOL requirements.)
Referee: Roberto Pérez (Peru)

12 April 2022
18:15 UTC−4

Deportivo La Guaira (Venezuela)	0–2	(Brazil) Ceará
	Report	Vina 6'; Lima 9'

Estadio Olímpico de la UCV, Caracas
Referee: Ivo Méndez (Bolivia)
12 April 2022
21:30 UTC−3

Independiente (Argentina)	2–0	(Paraguay) General Caballero (JLM)
Benegas 66'; Soñora 73'	Report

Estadio Libertadores de América, Avellaneda
Referee: Guillermo Guerrero (Ecuador)

26 April 2022
18:15 UTC−4

Deportivo La Guaira (Venezuela)	0–2	(Argentina) Independiente
	Report	Blanco 67'; Fernández 90'

Estadio Olímpico de la UCV, Caracas
Referee: Nicolás Gallo (Colombia)
26 April 2022
18:15 UTC−4

General Caballero (JLM) (Paraguay)	0–2	(Brazil) Ceará
	Report	Erick 50' (pen.); Messias 69'

Estadio Manuel Ferreira, Asunción (Note: General Caballero (JLM) played their home matches against Ceará and Independiente at Estadio Manuel Ferreira, Asunción instead of their regular stadium Estadio Ka'arendy, Dr. Juan León Mallorquín which did not meet CONMEBOL requirements.)
Referee: Jhon Hinestroza (Colombia)

3 May 2022
21:30 UTC−3

Ceará (Brazil)	3–0	(Venezuela) Deportivo La Guaira
Mendoza 59'; Vina 66'; Erick 76'	Report

Castelão, Fortaleza
Referee: Christian Ferreyra (Uruguay)
3 May 2022
20:30 UTC−4

General Caballero (JLM) (Paraguay)	0–4	(Argentina) Independiente
	Report	Blanco 42' (pen.); Pozzo 58'; Fernández 87'; Soñora 90+4'

Estadio Manuel Ferreira, Asunción
Referee: Nicolás Gamboa (Chile)

17 May 2022
19:15 UTC−3

Ceará (Brazil)	6–0	(Paraguay) General Caballero (JLM)
Wescley 6'; Cléber 18', 32'; Mendoza 72', 78'; Zé Roberto 84'	Report

Castelão, Fortaleza
Referee: Jesús Cartagena (Peru)
19 May 2022
19:15 UTC−3

Independiente (Argentina)	4–0	(Venezuela) Deportivo La Guaira
Cumana 41' (o.g.); Benegas 47', 90'; Roa 83'	Report

Estadio Libertadores de América, Avellaneda
Referee: José Burgos (Uruguay)

25 May 2022
21:30 UTC−3

Independiente (Argentina)	0–2	(Brazil) Ceará
	Report	Lindoso 45+5'; Mendoza 90+1'

Estadio Libertadores de América, Avellaneda
Referee: Christian Ferreyra (Uruguay)
25 May 2022
20:30 UTC−4

Deportivo La Guaira (Venezuela)	0–1	(Paraguay) General Caballero (JLM)
	Report	Fernández 32'

Estadio Olímpico de la UCV, Caracas
Referee: Roberto Pérez (Peru)

=== Group H ===
Pos	Team	Pld	W	D	L	GF	GA	GD	Pts	Qualification	UNI	FLU	JUN	ORI
1	(Argentina) Unión	6	3	3	0	10	2	+8	12	Round of 16	—	0–0	1–1	2–0
2	(Brazil) Fluminense	6	3	2	1	15	5	+10	11		0–0	—	2–1	3–0
3	(Colombia) Junior	6	3	1	2	10	8	+2	10		0–4	3–0	—	2–0
4	(Bolivia) Oriente Petrolero	6	0	0	6	3	23	−20	0		1–3	1–10	1–3	—

Source: CONMEBOL
6 April 2022
19:15 UTC−3

Fluminense (Brazil)	3–0	(Bolivia) Oriente Petrolero
Cristiano 30'; Arias 39'; Zazpe 73' (o.g.)	Report

Estádio do Maracanã, Rio de Janeiro
Attendance: 20,500
Referee: José Argote (Venezuela)
6 April 2022
19:15 UTC−3

Unión (Argentina)	1–1	(Colombia) Junior
Vera 2'	Report	Vera 6' (o.g.)

Estadio 15 de Abril, Santa Fe
Referee: Andrés Matonte (Uruguay)

12 April 2022
18:15 UTC−4

Oriente Petrolero (Bolivia)	1–3	(Argentina) Unión
Dorrego 90+1'	Report	Calderón 4'; Peralta 70'; Juárez 90+4'

Estadio Ramón Tahuichi Aguilera, Santa Cruz de la Sierra
Attendance: 7,798
Referee: Marlon Vera (Ecuador)
13 April 2022
19:30 UTC−5

Junior (Colombia)	3–0	(Brazil) Fluminense
Moreno 10'; Borja 45+2' (pen.); Sambueza 90+5'	Report

Estadio Metropolitano Roberto Meléndez, Barranquilla
Referee: Alexis Herrera (Venezuela)

26 April 2022
21:30 UTC−3

Fluminense (Brazil)	0–0	(Argentina) Unión
	Report

Estádio do Maracanã, Rio de Janeiro
Attendance: 11,140
Referee: Esteban Ostojich (Uruguay)
28 April 2022
20:30 UTC−4

Oriente Petrolero (Bolivia)	1–3	(Colombia) Junior
Guaycochea 51'	Report	Albornoz 36', 66'; Hinestroza 90+7'

Estadio Ramón Tahuichi Aguilera, Santa Cruz de la Sierra
Referee: Piero Maza (Chile)

4 May 2022
21:30 UTC−3

Fluminense (Brazil)	2–1	(Colombia) Junior
Ganso 4'; Luiz Henrique 73'	Report	Borja 55'

Estádio do Maracanã, Rio de Janeiro
Referee: Mario Díaz de Vivar (Paraguay)
5 May 2022
19:15 UTC−3

Unión (Argentina)	2–0	(Bolivia) Oriente Petrolero
Luna Diale 12'; Roldán 56'	Report

Estadio 15 de Abril, Santa Fe
Referee: José Cabero (Chile)

17 May 2022
19:30 UTC−5

Junior (Colombia)	2–0	(Bolivia) Oriente Petrolero
Borja 23' (pen.), 28'	Report

Estadio Metropolitano Roberto Meléndez, Barranquilla
Attendance: 13,749
Referee: Yender Herrera (Venezuela)
19 May 2022
19:15 UTC−3

Unión (Argentina)	0–0	(Brazil) Fluminense
	Report

Estadio 15 de Abril, Santa Fe
Referee: Andrés Cunha (Uruguay)

26 May 2022
19:30 UTC−5

Junior (Colombia)	0–4	(Argentina) Unión
	Report	Albornoz 2' (o.g.); Álvez 41'; Zenon 47'; Gallegos 89'

Estadio Metropolitano Roberto Meléndez, Barranquilla
Referee: Eber Aquino (Paraguay)
26 May 2022
20:30 UTC−4

Oriente Petrolero (Bolivia)	1–10	(Brazil) Fluminense
Álvarez 15'	Report	Matheus Martins 1', 40', 54'; Cano 9', 13', 58'; Arias 17'; Caio Paulista 36'; Manoel 66'; Willian 75'

Estadio Ramón Tahuichi Aguilera, Santa Cruz de la Sierra
Referee: Guillermo Guerrero (Ecuador)
