= 2022 Copa Sudamericana first stage =

Stage of the 2022 Copa Sudamericana

The 2022 Copa Sudamericana first stage was played from 8 to 17 March 2022. A total of 32 teams competed in the first stage to decide 16 of the 32 places in the group stage of the 2022 Copa Sudamericana.

== Draw ==
The draw for the first stage was held on 20 December 2021, 12:00 PYST (UTC−3), at the CONMEBOL Convention Centre in Luque, Paraguay. For the first stage, the 32 teams involved were divided into eight pots according to their national association.

The 32 teams were drawn into 16 ties, with the four teams from each national association being drawn against a rival from the same association in two ties per association and the first team drawn in each tie hosting the second leg.

First stage draw
Bolivia	Chile	Colombia	Ecuador
(Bolivia) Royal Pari; (Bolivia) Oriente Petrolero; (Bolivia) Jorge Wilstermann; (Bolivia) Guabirá	(Chile) Unión La Calera; (Chile) Unión Española; (Chile) Deportes Antofagasta; (Chile) Ñublense	(Colombia) Junior; (Colombia) América de Cali; (Colombia) La Equidad; (Colombia) Independiente Medellín	(Ecuador) 9 de Octubre; (Ecuador) LDU Quito; (Ecuador) Mushuc Runa; (Ecuador) Delfín
Paraguay	Peru	Uruguay	Venezuela
(Paraguay) Nacional; (Paraguay) Guaireña; (Paraguay) Sol de América; (Paraguay) General Caballero (JLM)	(Peru) Melgar; (Peru) Cienciano; (Peru) Sport Boys; (Peru) Ayacucho	(Uruguay) Cerro Largo; (Uruguay) Montevideo Wanderers; (Uruguay) Liverpool; (Uruguay) River Plate	(Venezuela) Deportivo La Guaira; (Venezuela) Estudiantes de Mérida; (Venezuela) Metropolitanos; (Venezuela) Hermanos Colmenarez

== Format ==
In the first stage, each tie was played on a home-and-away two-legged basis. If tied on aggregate, extra time was not played, and a penalty shoot-out was used to determine the winner (Regulations Article 2.4.2).

The 16 winners of the first stage advanced to the group stage to join the 12 teams directly qualified for that stage (six from Argentina and six from Brazil), and four teams transferred from the Copa Libertadores (the four teams eliminated in the third stage of qualifying).

== Matches ==
The first legs were played on 8–10 March, while the second legs were played on 15–17 March 2021.

Team 1	Agg.	Team 2	1st leg	2nd leg
Jorge Wilstermann (Bolivia)	4–3	(Bolivia) Guabirá	4–0	0–3
Royal Pari (Bolivia)	2–6	(Bolivia) Oriente Petrolero	2–3	0–3
Unión Española (Chile)	2–2 (1–4 p)	(Chile) Deportes Antofagasta	1–2	1–0
Ñublense (Chile)	1–2	(Chile) Unión La Calera	0–0	1–2
La Equidad (Colombia)	1–3	(Colombia) Junior	0–0	1–3
Independiente Medellín (Colombia)	3–3 (3–1 p)	(Colombia) América de Cali	2–1	1–2
Delfín (Ecuador)	1–3	(Ecuador) 9 de Octubre	1–1	0–2
Mushuc Runa (Ecuador)	1–3	(Ecuador) LDU Quito	0–2	1–1
Nacional (Paraguay)	0–1	(Paraguay) Guaireña	0–1	0–0
Sol de América (Paraguay)	1–5	(Paraguay) General Caballero (JLM)	0–3	1–2
Ayacucho (Peru)	4–3	(Peru) Sport Boys	2–0	2–3
Cienciano (Peru)	1–2	(Peru) Melgar	1–1	0–1
Montevideo Wanderers (Uruguay)	3–1	(Uruguay) Cerro Largo	2–1	1–0
Liverpool (Uruguay)	0–3	(Uruguay) River Plate	0–1	0–2
Estudiantes de Mérida (Venezuela)	0–6	(Venezuela) Metropolitanos	0–2	0–4
Hermanos Colmenarez (Venezuela)	2–3	(Venezuela) Deportivo La Guaira	2–0	0–3

=== Match BOL 1 ===
10 March 2022
20:30 UTC−4

Jorge Wilstermann (Bolivia)	4–0	(Bolivia) Guabirá
Sanguinetti 24'; A. Chávez 38'; Serginho 54' (pen.); Vargas 90+1'	Report

Estadio Félix Capriles, Cochabamba
Attendance: 6,837
Referee: Derlis López (Paraguay)

17 March 2022
20:30 UTC−4

Guabirá (Bolivia)	3–0	(Bolivia) Jorge Wilstermann
Mina 20', 50'; Figueroa 90+3'	Report

Estadio Gilberto Parada, Montero
Attendance: 4,161
Referee: Guillermo Guerrero (Ecuador)

Jorge Wilstermann won 4–3 on aggregate and advanced to the group stage (BOL 1).

=== Match BOL 2 ===
8 March 2022
18:15 UTC−4

Royal Pari (Bolivia)	2–3	(Bolivia) Oriente Petrolero
Justiniano 28'; Álvarez 85'	Report	Caire 18'; Suárez 71'; Rojas 83'

Estadio Ramón Tahuichi Aguilera, Santa Cruz de la Sierra
Referee: José Méndez (Paraguay)

15 March 2022
18:15 UTC−4

Oriente Petrolero (Bolivia)	3–0	(Bolivia) Royal Pari
Suárez 65', 84'; Zazpe 90+5'	Report

Estadio Ramón Tahuichi Aguilera, Santa Cruz de la Sierra
Attendance: 11,992
Referee: Augusto Aragón (Ecuador)

Oriente Petrolero won 6–2 on aggregate and advanced to the group stage (BOL 2).

=== Match CHI 1 ===
10 March 2022
19:15 UTC−3

Unión Española (Chile)	1–2	(Chile) Deportes Antofagasta
Garate 13'	Report	Hurtado 6'; Robles 9'

Estadio Santa Laura, Santiago
Attendance: 3,023
Referee: Marlon Vera (Ecuador)

17 March 2022
19:15 UTC−3

Deportes Antofagasta (Chile)	0–1	(Chile) Unión Española
	Report	Piñeiro 49'
Penalties
Uribe (penalty scored); Bravo (penalty scored); Cuadra (penalty scored); Flores (penalty scored)	4–1	(penalty missed) Conelli; (penalty missed) T. Galdames; (penalty scored) Larenas

Estadio Regional Calvo y Bascuñán, Antofagasta
Attendance: 2,432
Referee: Jhon Ospina (Colombia)

Tied 2–2 on aggregate, Deportes Antofagasta won on penalties and advanced to the group stage (CHI 1).

=== Match CHI 2 ===
8 March 2022
21:30 UTC−3

Ñublense (Chile)	0–0	(Chile) Unión La Calera
	Report

Estadio Municipal Nelson Oyarzún Arenas, Chillán
Referee: Luis Quiroz (Ecuador)

15 March 2022
21:30 UTC−3

Unión La Calera (Chile)	2–1	(Chile) Ñublense
Sáez 44'; Ramírez 64'	Report	Vargas 90+4' (pen.)

Estadio Sausalito, Viña del Mar (Note: Unión La Calera played their home match at Estadio Sausalito, Viña del Mar instead of their regular stadium Estadio Municipal Nicolás Chahuán Nazar, La Calera, which did not meet CONMEBOL requirements.)
Attendance: 1,858
Referee: Gery Vargas (Bolivia)

Unión La Calera won 2–1 on aggregate and advanced to the group stage (CHI 2).

=== Match COL 1 ===
10 March 2022
19:30 UTC−5

La Equidad (Colombia)	0–0	(Colombia) Junior
	Report

Estadio El Campín, Bogotá (Note: La Equidad played their home match at Estadio El Campín, Bogotá instead of their regular stadium Estadio Metropolitano de Techo, Bogotá.)
Attendance: 3,629
Referee: Gustavo Tejera (Uruguay)

17 March 2022
19:30 UTC−5

Junior (Colombia)	3–1	(Colombia) La Equidad
Borja 5'; González 36'; Cabrera 80' (pen.)	Report	Chaverra 18'

Estadio Metropolitano Roberto Meléndez, Barranquilla
Attendance: 13,618
Referee: Raphael Claus (Brazil)

Junior won 3–1 on aggregate and advanced to the group stage (COL 1).

=== Match COL 2 ===
9 March 2022
19:30 UTC−5

Independiente Medellín (Colombia)	2–1	(Colombia) América de Cali
V. Hernández 45+2'; Cadavid 57'	Report	Ramos 48'

Estadio Atanasio Girardot, Medellín
Attendance: 25,028
Referee: Flávio de Souza (Brazil)

16 March 2022
19:30 UTC−5

América de Cali (Colombia)	2–1	(Colombia) Independiente Medellín
Sierra 9'; Ramos 63'	Report	Pons 24'
Penalties
Quintana (penalty missed); D. Hernández (penalty missed); Angulo (penalty scored); Mosquera (penalty missed)	1–3	(penalty scored) Cadavid; (penalty scored) Arregui; (penalty missed) J. Hernández; (penalty scored) Loaiza

Estadio Pascual Guerrero, Cali
Referee: Alexis Herrera (Venezuela)

Tied 3–3 on aggregate, Independiente Medellín won on penalties and advanced to the group stage (COL 2).

=== Match ECU 1 ===
10 March 2022
19:30 UTC−5

Delfín (Ecuador)	1–1	(Ecuador) 9 de Octubre
Chicaiza 72' (pen.)	Report	Becerra 21'

Estadio Jocay, Manta
Attendance: 3,050
Referee: Carlos Ortega (Colombia)

17 March 2022
19:30 UTC−5

9 de Octubre (Ecuador)	2–0	(Ecuador) Delfín
Phillips 35'; Luna 40'	Report

Estadio Christian Benítez Betancourt, Guayaquil (Note: 9 de Octubre played their home match at Estadio Christian Benítez Betancourt, Guayaquil instead of their regular stadium Estadio Modelo Alberto Spencer, Guayaquil.)
Attendance: 2,296
Referee: Cristian Garay (Chile)

9 de Octubre won 3–1 on aggregate and advanced to the group stage (ECU 1).

=== Match ECU 2 ===
9 March 2022
19:30 UTC−5

Mushuc Runa (Ecuador)	0–2	(Ecuador) LDU Quito
	Report	Z. Romero 62'; Alvarado 87'

Estadio Bellavista, Ambato (Note: Mushuc Runa played their home match at Estadio Bellavista, Ambato instead of their regular stadium Estadio COAC Mushuc Runa, Ambato, which did not meet CONMEBOL requirements.)
Referee: Carlos Betancur (Colombia)

16 March 2022
19:30 UTC−5

LDU Quito (Ecuador)	1–1	(Ecuador) Mushuc Runa
Alvarado 27'	Report	Alonso 64'

Estadio Rodrigo Paz Delgado, Quito
Referee: Leodán González (Uruguay)

LDU Quito won 3–1 on aggregate and advanced to the group stage (ECU 2).

=== Match PAR 1 ===
10 March 2022
19:15 UTC−3

Nacional (Paraguay)	0–1	(Paraguay) Guaireña
	Report	Marín 53'

Estadio Defensores del Chaco, Asunción (Note: Nacional played their home match at Estadio Defensores del Chaco, Asunción instead of their regular stadium Estadio Arsenio Erico, Asunción, which did not meet CONMEBOL requirements.)
Attendance: 1,054
Referee: Kevin Ortega (Peru)

17 March 2022
19:15 UTC−3

Guaireña (Paraguay)	0–0	(Paraguay) Nacional
	Report

Estadio Defensores del Chaco, Asunción (Note: Guaireña played their home match at Estadio Defensores del Chaco, Asunción instead of their regular stadium Estadio Parque del Guairá, Villarrica, which did not meet CONMEBOL requirements.)
Attendance: 411
Referee: José Argote (Venezuela)

Guaireña won 1–0 on aggregate and advanced to the group stage (PAR 1).

=== Match PAR 2 ===
8 March 2022 (Note: The Sol de América v General Caballero (JLM) match, originally scheduled for 9 March 2022, 19:15 local time was rescheduled to 8 March 2022, 19:15 local time.)
19:15 UTC−3

Sol de América (Paraguay)	0–3	(Paraguay) General Caballero (JLM)
	Report	Marabel 43'; González 58'; Rodríguez 90'

Estadio Defensores del Chaco, Asunción (Note: Sol de América played their home match at Estadio Defensores del Chaco, Asunción instead of their regular stadium Estadio Luis Alfonso Giagni, Villa Elisa.)
Attendance: 275
Referee: Augusto Menéndez (Peru)

15 March 2022 (Note: The General Caballero (JLM) v Sol de América match, originally scheduled for 16 March 2022, 19:15 local time was rescheduled to 15 March 2022, 19:15 local time.)
19:15 UTC−3

General Caballero (JLM) (Paraguay)	2–1	(Paraguay) Sol de América
Heinze 6'; Alfonso 57'	Report	Viera 9' (pen.)

Estadio Defensores del Chaco, Asunción (Note: General Caballero (JLM) played their home match at Estadio Defensores del Chaco, Asunción instead of their regular stadium Estadio Ka'arendy, Dr. Juan León Mallorquín, which did not meet CONMEBOL requirements.)
Referee: Piero Maza (Chile)

General Caballero (JLM) won 5–1 on aggregate and advanced to the group stage (PAR 2).

=== Match PER 1 ===
9 March 2022
19:30 UTC−5

Ayacucho (Peru)	2–0	(Peru) Sport Boys
Salazar 35'; Royón 58'	Report

Estadio Huancayo, Huancayo (Note: Ayacucho played their home match at Estadio Huancayo, Huancayo instead of their regular stadium Estadio Ciudad de Cumaná, Ayacucho, which did not meet CONMEBOL requirements.)
Attendance: 512
Referee: Piero Maza (Chile)

16 March 2022
19:30 UTC−5

Sport Boys (Peru)	3–2	(Peru) Ayacucho
Blanco 23' (pen.), 42'; Ramírez 73'	Report	Techera 51'; Quina 63'

Estadio Nacional, Lima (Note: Sport Boys played their home match at Estadio Nacional, Lima instead of their regular stadium Estadio Miguel Grau, Callao.)
Attendance: 5,931
Referee: Ivo Méndez (Bolivia)

Ayacucho won 4–3 on aggregate and advanced to the group stage (PER 1).

=== Match PER 2 ===
8 March 2022
19:30 UTC−5

Cienciano (Peru)	1–1	(Peru) Melgar
Estrada 48'	Report	Cuesta 24' (pen.)

Estadio Garcilaso, Cusco
Attendance: 13,083
Referee: Nicolás Gamboa (Chile)

15 March 2022
19:30 UTC−5

Melgar (Peru)	1–0	(Peru) Cienciano
Cuesta 19'	Report

Estadio Monumental de la UNSA, Arequipa
Attendance: 11,366
Referee: Andrés Rojas (Colombia)

Melgar won 2–1 on aggregate and advanced to the group stage (PER 2).

=== Match URU 1 ===
10 March 2022
21:30 UTC−3

Montevideo Wanderers (Uruguay)	2–1	(Uruguay) Cerro Largo
Rivero 74'; Riolfo 79'	Report	Onetto 51'

Parque Alfredo Víctor Viera, Montevideo
Referee: Ángel Arteaga (Venezuela)

17 March 2022
21:30 UTC−3

Cerro Largo (Uruguay)	0–1	(Uruguay) Montevideo Wanderers
	Report	Pais 63'

Estadio Centenario, Montevideo (Note: Cerro Largo played their home match at Estadio Centenario, Montevideo instead of their regular stadium Estadio Arquitecto Antonio Eleuterio Ubilla, Melo, which did not meet CONMEBOL requirements.)
Referee: Kevin Ortega (Peru)

Montevideo Wanderers won 3–1 on aggregate and advanced to the group stage (URU 1).

=== Match URU 2 ===
9 March 2022
19:15 UTC−3

Liverpool (Uruguay)	0–1	(Uruguay) River Plate
	Report	Borbas 18' (pen.)

Estadio Centenario, Montevideo (Note: Liverpool played their home match at Estadio Centenario, Montevideo instead of their regular stadium Estadio Belvedere, Montevideo, which did not meet CONMEBOL requirements.)
Attendance: 1,168
Referee: Yender Herrera (Venezuela)

16 March 2022
19:15 UTC−3

River Plate (Uruguay)	2–0	(Uruguay) Liverpool
Sosa 64', 85'	Report

Estadio Centenario, Montevideo (Note: River Plate played their home match at Estadio Centenario, Montevideo (originally scheduled at Parque Alfredo Víctor Viera, Montevideo) instead of their regular stadium Parque Federico Omar Saroldi, Montevideo, which did not meet CONMEBOL requirements.)
Attendance: 1,973
Referee: Nicolás Lamolina (Argentina)

River Plate won 3–0 on aggregate and advanced to the group stage (URU 2).

=== Match VEN 1 ===
8 March 2022
18:15 UTC−4

Estudiantes de Mérida (Venezuela)	0–2	(Venezuela) Metropolitanos
	Report	Araújo 30'; Annese 71'

Estadio Metropolitano, Mérida
Attendance: 2,454
Referee: Ivo Méndez (Bolivia)

15 March 2022
18:15 UTC−4

Metropolitanos (Venezuela)	4–0	(Venezuela) Estudiantes de Mérida
Flores 34'; Ortiz 88'; Guaramato 90' (o.g.); Cova 90+2'	Report

Estadio Olímpico de la UCV, Caracas
Referee: Juan Benítez (Paraguay)

Metropolitanos won 6–0 on aggregate and advanced to the group stage (VEN 1).

=== Match VEN 2 ===
10 March 2022
18:15 UTC−4

Hermanos Colmenarez (Venezuela)	2–0	(Venezuela) Deportivo La Guaira
Magallán 44'; González 55'	Report

Estadio Agustín Tovar, Barinas
Attendance: 989
Referee: Dilio Rodríguez (Bolivia)

17 March 2022
18:15 UTC−4

Deportivo La Guaira (Venezuela)	3–0	(Venezuela) Hermanos Colmenarez
Unrein 5'; Ramos 32'; Cumana 56'	Report

Estadio Olímpico de la UCV, Caracas
Referee: Derlis López (Paraguay)

Deportivo La Guaira won 3–2 on aggregate and advanced to the group stage (VEN 2).
