= 2022 Copa Sudamericana final stages =

The 2022 Copa Sudamericana final stages were played from 28 June to 1 October 2022. A total of 16 teams competed in the final stages to decide the champions of the 2022 Copa Sudamericana, with the final played in Córdoba, Argentina at the Estadio Mario Alberto Kempes.

== Qualified teams ==
The winners of each of the eight groups in the Copa Sudamericana group stage as well as the third-placed teams of each of the eight groups in the Copa Libertadores group stage advanced to the round of 16.

=== Copa Sudamericana group stage winners ===
Group	Winners
A	(Argentina) Lanús
B	(Peru) Melgar
C	(Brazil) Santos
D	(Brazil) São Paulo
E	(Brazil) Internacional
F	(Brazil) Atlético Goianiense
G	(Brazil) Ceará
H	(Argentina) Unión

=== Copa Libertadores group stage third-placed teams ===
Group	Third-placed teams
A	(Venezuela) Deportivo Táchira
B	(Bolivia) The Strongest
C	(Uruguay) Nacional
D	(Ecuador) Independiente del Valle
E	(Colombia) Deportivo Cali
F	(Chile) Colo-Colo
G	(Paraguay) Olimpia
H	(Chile) Universidad Católica

=== Seeding ===
Starting from the round of 16, the teams are seeded according to their results in the group stage, with the Copa Sudamericana group winners (Pot 1) seeded 1–8, and the Copa Libertadores group third-placed teams (Pot 2) seeded 9–16.

Seed	Grp	Team	Pld	W	D	L	GF	GA	GD	Pts	Round of 16 draw
1	SG	(Brazil) Ceará	6	6	0	0	17	1	+16	18	Pot 1
2	SD	(Brazil) São Paulo	6	5	1	0	12	3	+9	16	Pot 1
3	SF	(Brazil) Atlético Goianiense	6	4	1	1	11	5	+6	13	Pot 1
4	SH	(Argentina) Unión	6	3	3	0	10	2	+8	12	Pot 1
5	SE	(Brazil) Internacional	6	3	3	0	12	5	+7	12	Pot 1
6	SB	(Peru) Melgar	6	4	0	2	10	6	+4	12	Pot 1
7	SA	(Argentina) Lanús	6	3	2	1	7	4	+3	11	Pot 1
8	SC	(Brazil) Santos	6	3	2	1	7	5	+2	11	Pot 1
9	LE	(Colombia) Deportivo Cali	6	2	2	2	7	4	+3	8	Pot 2
10	LD	(Ecuador) Independiente del Valle	6	2	2	2	9	7	+2	8	Pot 2
11	LG	(Paraguay) Olimpia	6	2	2	2	4	4	0	8	Pot 2
12	LC	(Uruguay) Nacional	6	2	1	3	7	7	0	7	Pot 2
13	LF	(Chile) Colo-Colo	6	2	1	3	9	13	−4	7	Pot 2
14	LA	(Venezuela) Deportivo Táchira	6	2	1	3	8	14	−6	7	Pot 2
15	LB	(Bolivia) The Strongest	6	1	3	2	8	7	+1	6	Pot 2
16	LH	(Chile) Universidad Católica	6	1	1	4	5	10	−5	4	Pot 2

Source: CONMEBOL
Rules for classification: 1) Higher position in group; 2) Points; 3) Goal difference; 4) Goals scored; 5) Away goals scored; 6) CONMEBOL ranking (Regulations Article 2.4.3).

== Format ==
Starting from the round of 16, the teams played a single-elimination tournament with the following rules:

- In the round of 16, quarter-finals and semi-finals, each tie was played on a home-and-away two-legged basis, with the higher-seeded team hosting the second leg (Regulations Article 2.2.3). If tied on aggregate, extra time was not played, and a penalty shoot-out was used to determine the winners (Regulations Article 2.4.4).
- The final was played as a single match at a venue pre-selected by CONMEBOL, with the higher-seeded team designated as the "home" team for administrative purposes (Regulations Article 2.2.6). If tied after regulation, 30 minutes of extra time were played. If still tied after extra time, a penalty shoot-out was used to determine the winners (Regulations Article 2.4.5).

== Draw ==
The draw for the round of 16 was held on 27 May 2022, 12:00 PYT (UTC−4) at the CONMEBOL Convention Center in Luque, Paraguay. For the round of 16, the 16 teams were drawn into eight ties (A–H) between a Copa Sudamericana group winner (Pot 1) and a Copa Libertadores group third-placed team (Pot 2), with the group winners hosting the second leg. Teams from the same association or the same group could be drawn into the same tie (Regulations Article 2.2.3.2).

== Bracket ==
The bracket starting from the round of 16 was determined as follows:

Round	Matchups
Round of 16	(Group winners host second leg, matchups decided by draw): Match A; Match B; Match C; Match D; Match E; Match F; Match G; Match H
Quarter-finals	(Higher-seeded team host second leg): Match S1: Winner A vs. Winner H; Match S2: Winner B vs. Winner G; Match S3: Winner C vs. Winner F; Match S4: Winner D vs. Winner E
Semi-finals	(Higher-seeded team host second leg): Match F1: Winner S1 vs. Winner S4; Match F2: Winner S2 vs. Winner S3
Final	(Higher-seeded team designated as "home" team): Winner F1 vs. Winner F2

The bracket was decided based on the round of 16 draw, which was held on 27 May 2022.

Round of 16
12	(Uruguay) Nacional	2	2	4
4	(Argentina) Unión	0	1	1
11	(Paraguay) Olimpia	2	0	2 (3)
3	(Brazil) Atlético Goianiense (p)	0	2	2 (5)
16	(Chile) Universidad Católica	2	1	3
2	(Brazil) São Paulo	4	4	8
15	(Bolivia) The Strongest	1	0	1
1	(Brazil) Ceará	2	3	5
14	(Venezuela) Deportivo Táchira (p)	1	1	2 (4)
8	(Brazil) Santos	1	1	2 (2)
10	(Ecuador) Independiente del Valle	2	0	2
7	(Argentina) Lanús	1	0	1
9	(Colombia) Deportivo Cali	0	1	1
6	(Peru) Melgar	0	2	2
13	(Chile) Colo-Colo	2	1	3
5	(Brazil) Internacional	0	4	4

Quarter-finals
12	(Uruguay) Nacional	0	0	0
3	(Brazil) Atlético Goianiense	1	3	4
2	(Brazil) São Paulo (p)	1	1	2 (4)
1	(Brazil) Ceará	0	2	2 (3)
14	(Venezuela) Deportivo Táchira	0	1	1
10	(Ecuador) Independiente del Valle	1	4	5
6	(Peru) Melgar (p)	0	0	0 (3)
5	(Brazil) Internacional	0	0	0 (1)

Semi-finals
3	(Brazil) Atlético Goianiense	3	0	3 (2)
2	(Brazil) São Paulo (p)	1	2	3 (4)
10	(Ecuador) Independiente del Valle	3	3	6
6	(Peru) Melgar	0	0	0

Final
1 October – Córdoba
2	(Brazil) São Paulo	0
10	(Ecuador) Independiente del Valle	2

== Round of 16 ==
The first legs were played on 28–30 June, and the second legs were played on 5–7 July 2022.

Team 1	Agg.	Team 2	1st leg	2nd leg
Deportivo Táchira (Venezuela)	2–2 (4–2 p)	(Brazil) Santos	1–1	1–1
Nacional (Uruguay)	4–1	(Argentina) Unión	2–0	2–1
Universidad Católica (Chile)	3–8	(Brazil) São Paulo	2–4	1–4
Colo-Colo (Chile)	3–4	(Brazil) Internacional	2–0	1–4
Deportivo Cali (Colombia)	1–2	(Peru) Melgar	0–0	1–2
The Strongest (Bolivia)	1–5	(Brazil) Ceará	1–2	0–3
Olimpia (Paraguay)	2–2 (3–5 p)	(Brazil) Atlético Goianiense	2–0	0–2
Independiente del Valle (Ecuador)	2–1	(Argentina) Lanús	2–1	0–0

=== Match A ===
29 June 2022
20:30 UTC−4

Deportivo Táchira (Venezuela)	1–1	(Brazil) Santos
Zanocelo 30' (o.g.)	Report	Angulo 86'

Estadio Polideportivo de Pueblo Nuevo, San Cristóbal
Referee: Gery Vargas (Bolivia)

6 July 2022
21:30 UTC−3

Santos (Brazil)	1–1	(Venezuela) Deportivo Táchira
Marcos Leonardo 69'	Report	Uribe 27'
Penalties
Goulart (penalty missed); Sandry (penalty scored); Sánchez (penalty scored); Barbosa (penalty missed)	2–4	(penalty scored) Farías; (penalty scored) Simisterra; (penalty scored) Arace; (penalty scored) Fernández

Estádio Urbano Caldeira, Santos (Note: Santos played their home match at their regular stadium Estádio Urbano Caldeira, Santos instead of the originally scheduled Estádio do Morumbi, São Paulo.)
Attendance: 11,081
Referee: Kevin Ortega (Peru)

Tied 2–2 on aggregate, Deportivo Táchira won on penalties and advanced to the quarter-finals (Match S1).

=== Match B ===
28 June 2022
19:15 UTC−3

Nacional (Uruguay)	2–0	(Argentina) Unión
Fagúndez 4'; Lozano 21'	Report

Estadio Gran Parque Central, Montevideo
Referee: Cristian Garay (Chile)

5 July 2022
19:15 UTC−3

Unión (Argentina)	1–2	(Uruguay) Nacional
Brítez 70'	Report	I. Ramírez 78'; J. Rodríguez 83'

Estadio 15 de Abril, Santa Fe
Attendance: 19,569
Referee: Piero Maza (Chile)

Nacional won 4–1 on aggregate and advanced to the quarter-finals (Match S2).

=== Match C ===
30 June 2022
20:30 UTC−4

Universidad Católica (Chile)	2–4	(Brazil) São Paulo
Zampedri 47'; Valencia 85'	Report	Reinaldo 15' (pen.); Luciano 28', 39'; Calleri 63'

Estadio San Carlos de Apoquindo, Santiago (Note: Universidad Católica played their home match against São Paulo at their regular stadium Estadio San Carlos de Apoquindo, Santiago, instead of the originally scheduled Estadio Nacional Julio Martínez Prádanos, Santiago.)
Referee: Christian Ferreyra (Uruguay)

7 July 2022
21:30 UTC−3

São Paulo (Brazil)	4–1	(Chile) Universidad Católica
Luciano 14'; Éder 45+5' (pen.); João Moreira 59'; Rodrigo 81'	Report	Fuenzalida 89'

Estádio do Morumbi, São Paulo
Attendance: 47,097
Referee: Alexis Herrera (Venezuela)

São Paulo won 8–3 on aggregate and advanced to the quarter-finals (Match S3).

=== Match D ===
28 June 2022
20:30 UTC−4

Colo-Colo (Chile)	2–0	(Brazil) Internacional
Lucero 12'; Solari 55'	Report

Estadio Monumental David Arellano, Santiago
Attendance: 8,444
Referee: Patricio Loustau (Argentina)

5 July 2022
21:30 UTC−3

Internacional (Brazil)	4–1	(Chile) Colo-Colo
Alan Patrick 29'; Edenílson 32'; Alemão 60'; Pedro Henrique 74'	Report	Costa 15' (pen.)

Estádio Beira-Rio, Porto Alegre
Attendance: 40,598
Referee: Darío Herrera (Argentina)

Internacional won 4–3 on aggregate and advanced to the quarter-finals (Match S4).

=== Match E ===
29 June 2022
19:30 UTC−5

Deportivo Cali (Colombia)	0–0	(Peru) Melgar
	Report

Estadio Deportivo Cali, Palmira
Referee: Mario Díaz de Vivar (Paraguay)

6 July 2022
19:30 UTC−5

Melgar (Peru)	2–1	(Colombia) Deportivo Cali
Cuesta 58' (pen.), 73'	Report	Mosquera 90+7'

Estadio Monumental de la UNSA, Arequipa
Attendance: 30,863
Referee: Facundo Tello (Argentina)

Melgar won 2–1 on aggregate and advanced to the quarter-finals (Match S4).

=== Match F ===
29 June 2022
18:15 UTC−4

The Strongest (Bolivia)	1–2	(Brazil) Ceará
Ursino 5'	Report	Erick 76'; Zé Roberto 90+3'

Estadio Hernando Siles, La Paz
Referee: Esteban Ostojich (Uruguay)

6 July 2022
19:15 UTC−3

Ceará (Brazil)	3–0	(Bolivia) The Strongest
Richardson 23'; Victor Luis 26'; Lima 52'	Report

Castelão, Fortaleza
Attendance: 46,231
Referee: Derlis López (Paraguay)

Ceará won 5–1 on aggregate and advanced to the quarter-finals (Match S3).

=== Match G ===
30 June 2022
20:30 UTC−4

Olimpia (Paraguay)	2–0	(Brazil) Atlético Goianiense
D. González 36'; Silva 56'	Report

Estadio Defensores del Chaco, Asunción (Note: Olimpia played their home match at Estadio Defensores del Chaco, Asunción, instead of their regular stadium Estadio Manuel Ferreira, Asunción.)
Referee: Piero Maza (Chile)

7 July 2022
21:30 UTC−3

Atlético Goianiense (Brazil)	2–0	(Paraguay) Olimpia
Churín 4'; Airton 8'	Report
Penalties
Wellington Rato (penalty scored); Baralhas (penalty scored); Shaylon (penalty scored); Rickson (penalty scored); Marlon Freitas (penalty scored)	5–3	(penalty scored) Silva; (penalty missed) Quintana; (penalty scored) Ortiz; (penalty scored) Cardozo

Estádio Serra Dourada, Goiânia (Note: Atlético Goianiense played their home matches at Estádio Serra Dourada, Goiânia, instead of their regular stadium Estádio Antônio Accioly, Goiânia which did not meet CONMEBOL requirements.)
Attendance: 17,148
Referee: Wilmar Roldán (Colombia)

Tied 2–2 on aggregate, Atlético Goianiense won on penalties and advanced to the quarter-finals (Match S2).

=== Match H ===
30 June 2022
17:15 UTC−5

Independiente del Valle (Ecuador)	2–1	(Argentina) Lanús
Schunke 45+2'; Ayoví 90+3'	Report	Belmonte 60'

Estadio Olímpico Atahualpa, Quito (Note: Independiente del Valle played their home match against Lanús at Estadio Olímpico Atahualpa, Quito, instead of the originally scheduled Estadio Rodrigo Paz Delgado, Quito.)
Referee: Kevin Ortega (Peru)

7 July 2022
19:15 UTC−3

Lanús (Argentina)	0–0	(Ecuador) Independiente del Valle
	Report

Estadio Ciudad de Lanús, Lanús
Attendance: 4,680
Referee: Cristian Garay (Chile)

Independiente del Valle won 2–1 on aggregate and advanced to the quarter-finals (Match S1).

== Quarter-finals ==
The first legs were played on 2–4 August, and the second legs were played on 9–11 August 2022.

Team 1	Agg.	Team 2	1st leg	2nd leg
Deportivo Táchira (Venezuela)	1–5	(Ecuador) Independiente del Valle	0–1	1–4
Nacional (Uruguay)	0–4	(Brazil) Atlético Goianiense	0–1	0–3
São Paulo (Brazil)	2–2 (4–3 p)	(Brazil) Ceará	1–0	1–2
Melgar (Peru)	0–0 (3–1 p)	(Brazil) Internacional	0–0	0–0

=== Match S1 ===
2 August 2022
20:30 UTC−4

Deportivo Táchira (Venezuela)	0–1	(Ecuador) Independiente del Valle
	Report	Angulo 3'

Estadio Polideportivo de Pueblo Nuevo, San Cristóbal
Attendance: 11,206
Referee: Wilton Sampaio (Brazil)

9 August 2022
19:30 UTC−5

Independiente del Valle (Ecuador)	4–1	(Venezuela) Deportivo Táchira
Chávez 32'; Sornoza 45+5' (pen.); Díaz 64'; Faravelli 81' (pen.)	Report	Hernández 26'

Estadio Rodrigo Paz Delgado, Quito (Note: Independiente del Valle played their home matches at Estadio Rodrigo Paz Delgado, Quito, instead of their regular stadium Estadio Banco Guayaquil, Quito which did not meet CONMEBOL requirements.)
Attendance: 3,919
Referee: Jhon Ospina (Colombia)

Independiente del Valle won 5–1 on aggregate and advanced to the semi-finals (Match F1).

=== Match S2 ===
2 August 2022
19:15 UTC−3

Nacional (Uruguay)	0–1	(Brazil) Atlético Goianiense
	Report	Luiz Fernando 23'

Estadio Gran Parque Central, Montevideo
Attendance: 28,481
Referee: Eber Aquino (Paraguay)

9 August 2022
19:15 UTC−3

Atlético Goianiense (Brazil)	3–0	(Uruguay) Nacional
Luiz Fernando 5', 53'; Baralhas 45+1'	Report

Estádio Serra Dourada, Goiânia
Attendance: 22,574
Referee: Darío Herrera (Argentina)

Atlético Goianiense won 4–0 on aggregate and advanced to the semi-finals (Match F2).

=== Match S3 ===
3 August 2022
19:15 UTC−3

São Paulo (Brazil)	1–0	(Brazil) Ceará
Nikão 70'	Report

Estádio do Morumbi, São Paulo
Attendance: 52,388
Referee: Piero Maza (Chile)

10 August 2022
19:15 UTC−3

Ceará (Brazil)	2–1	(Brazil) São Paulo
Mendoza 44'; Castilho 63'	Report	Igor Vinícius 53'
Penalties
Castilho (penalty missed); Victor Luis (penalty scored); Matheus Peixoto (penalty scored); Erick (penalty scored); Vina (penalty missed); Fernando Sobral (penalty missed)	3–4	(penalty scored) Calleri; (penalty missed) Igor Vinícius; (penalty scored) Luciano; (penalty scored) Diego Costa; (penalty missed) Igor Gomes; (penalty scored) Patrick

Castelão, Fortaleza
Attendance: 53,582
Referee: Fernando Rapallini (Argentina)

Tied 2–2 on aggregate, São Paulo won on penalties and advanced to the semi-finals (Match F2).

=== Match S4 ===
4 August 2022
17:15 UTC−5

Melgar (Peru)	0–0	(Brazil) Internacional
	Report

Estadio Monumental de la UNSA, Arequipa
Attendance: 27,281
Referee: Andrés Matonte (Uruguay)

11 August 2022
19:15 UTC−3

Internacional (Brazil)	0–0	(Peru) Melgar
	Report
Penalties
Edenílson (penalty missed); Taison (penalty missed); De Pena (penalty missed); Pedro Henrique (penalty scored)	1–3	(penalty scored) Cabrera; (penalty missed) Galeano; (penalty scored) Cuesta; (penalty scored) Iberico

Estádio Beira-Rio, Porto Alegre
Attendance: 43,191
Referee: Roberto Tobar (Chile)

Tied 0–0 on aggregate, Melgar won on penalties and advanced to the semi-finals (Match F1).

== Semi-finals ==
The first legs were played on 31 August and 1 September, and the second legs were played on 7 and 8 September 2022.

Team 1	Agg.	Team 2	1st leg	2nd leg
Independiente del Valle (Ecuador)	6–0	(Peru) Melgar	3–0	3–0
Atlético Goianiense (Brazil)	3–3 (2–4 p)	(Brazil) São Paulo	3–1	0–2

=== Match F1 ===
31 August 2022
19:30 UTC−5 (Note: Both Independiente del Valle v Melgar matches, originally scheduled at 17:15 local time, were re-scheduled to 19:30 local time.)

Independiente del Valle (Ecuador)	3–0	(Peru) Melgar
Schunke 29'; Faravelli 67'; Díaz 69'	Report

Estadio Rodrigo Paz Delgado, Quito
Referee: Raphael Claus (Brazil)

7 September 2022
19:30 UTC−5

Melgar (Peru)	0–3	(Ecuador) Independiente del Valle
	Report	Díaz 28', 53'; Segovia 87'

Estadio Monumental de la UNSA, Arequipa
Referee: Fernando Rapallini (Argentina)

Independiente del Valle won 6–0 on aggregate and advanced to the final.

=== Match F2 ===
1 September 2022
21:30 UTC−3

Atlético Goianiense (Brazil)	3–1	(Brazil) São Paulo
Jorginho 11'; Shaylon 56'; Léo Pereira 78'	Report	Luciano 23'

Estádio Serra Dourada, Goiânia
Attendance: 33,047
Referee: Jesús Valenzuela (Venezuela)

8 September 2022
21:30 UTC−3

São Paulo (Brazil)	2–0	(Brazil) Atlético Goianiense
Patrick 4', 63'	Report
Penalties
Reinaldo (penalty scored); Calleri (penalty scored); Luciano (penalty missed); Igor Vinícius (penalty scored); Galoppo (penalty scored)	4–2	(penalty scored) Wellington Rato; (penalty missed) Baralhas; (penalty scored) Shaylon; (penalty missed) Léo Pereira

Estádio do Morumbi, São Paulo
Attendance: 53,988
Referee: Darío Herrera (Argentina)

Tied 3–3 on aggregate, São Paulo won on penalties and advanced to the final.

== Final ==
The final was played on 1 October 2022 at Estadio Mario Alberto Kempes in Córdoba.

1 October 2022
17:00 UTC−3

São Paulo (Brazil)	0–2	(Ecuador) Independiente del Valle
	Report	Díaz 13'; Faravelli 67'

Estadio Mario Alberto Kempes, Córdoba
Attendance: 24,683
Referee: Wilmar Roldán (Colombia)
