= 2022 Copa Sudamericana =

Copa CONMEBOL Sudamericana 2022
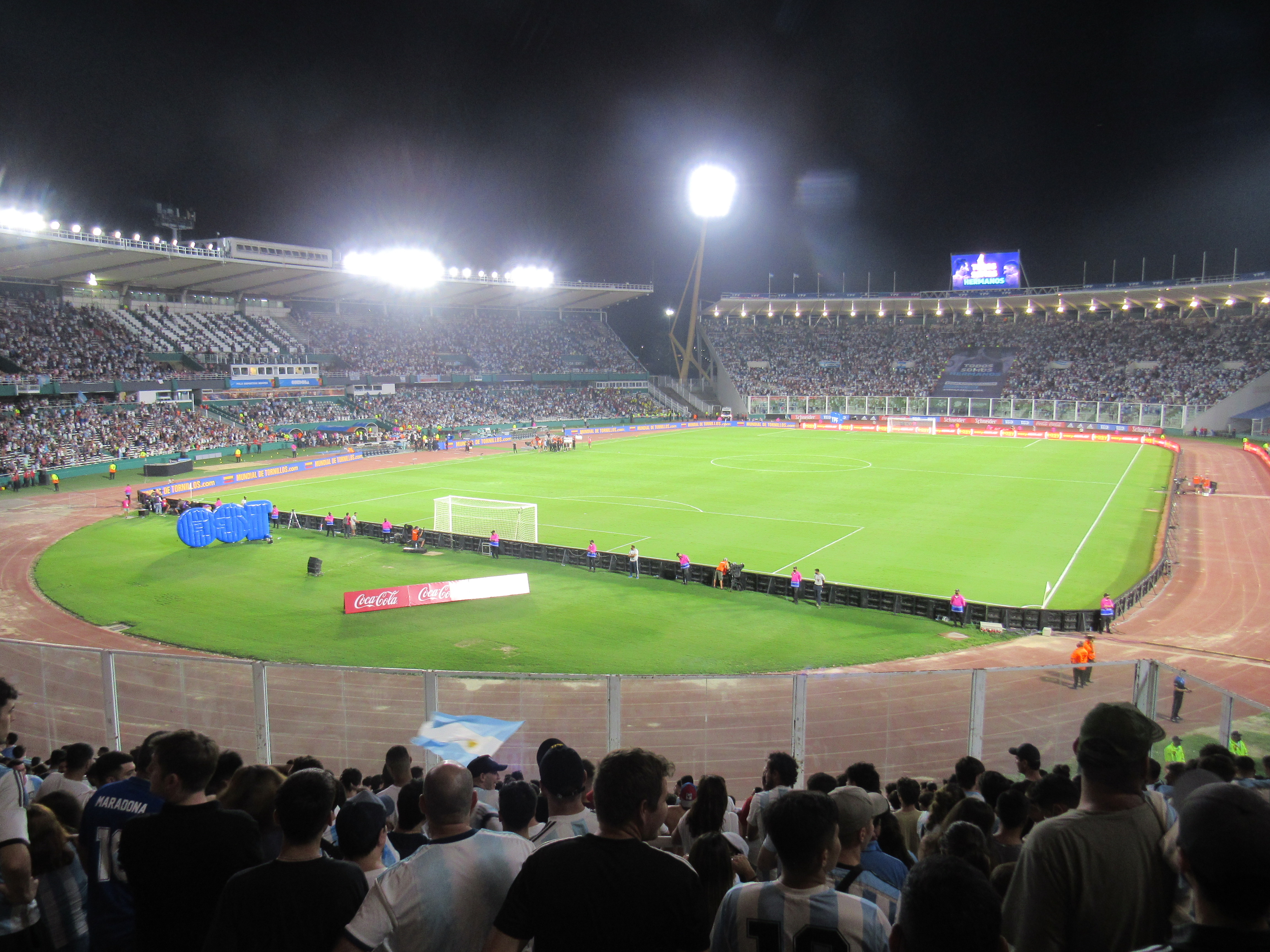
- The Estadio Mario Alberto Kempes in Córdoba hosted the final

Tournament details
- Dates: 8 March – 1 October 2022
- Teams: 44+12 (from 10 associations)

Final positions
- Champions: (Ecuador) Independiente del Valle (2nd title)
- Runners-up: (Brazil) São Paulo

Tournament statistics
- Matches played: 157
- Goals scored: 392 (2.5 per match)
- Top scorer: (Argentina) Bernardo Cuesta (8 goals)

The 2022 Copa CONMEBOL Sudamericana was the 21st edition of the CONMEBOL Sudamericana (also referred to as the Copa Sudamericana), South America's secondary club football tournament organized by CONMEBOL.

On 14 May 2020, CONMEBOL announced the candidate venues for the 2021, 2022 and 2023 club competition finals. On 13 May 2021, CONMEBOL's Council decided that the final would be played at the Estádio Nacional Mané Garrincha in Brasília, Brazil on 1 October 2022. However, on 23 June 2022 the confederation announced that a change of venue was requested by the Brazilian Football Confederation due to the 2022 Brazilian general election taking place one day after the date of the final, and confirmed Estadio Mario Alberto Kempes in Córdoba, Argentina as the new host for the match.

On 25 November 2021, CONMEBOL announced the abolition of the away goals rule in all of its club competitions including the Copa Sudamericana, which had been used since 2005. Accordingly, if in a two-legged tie two teams score the same number of aggregate goals, the winner of the tie would not be decided by the number of away goals scored by each team but by a penalty shoot-out.

Ecuadorian club Independiente del Valle won their second title in the competition after defeating Brazilian side São Paulo by a 2–0 score in the final. As winners of the 2022 Copa Sudamericana, they earned the right to play against the winners of the 2022 Copa Libertadores in the 2023 Recopa Sudamericana and they also automatically qualified for the 2023 Copa Libertadores group stage. Furthermore, in their condition of Copa Sudamericana champions, Independiente del Valle were later invited to play the 2023 UEFA–CONMEBOL Club Challenge against the 2022–23 UEFA Europa League champions. Athletico Paranaense were the previous champions, but did not defend their title since they qualified for the 2022 Copa Libertadores group stage as Copa Sudamericana champions and later advanced to the knockout stage.

== Teams ==
The following 44 teams from the 10 CONMEBOL associations qualified for the tournament:

- Argentina and Brazil: 6 berths each
- All other associations: 4 berths each

The entry stage was determined as follows:

- Group stage: 12 teams (teams from Argentina and Brazil)
- First stage: 32 teams (teams from all other associations)

Association	Team (Berth)	Entry stage	Qualification method
Argentina (6 berths)	Banfield (Argentina 1)	Group stage	2020 Copa de la Liga Profesional Copa Sudamericana qualifying play-off winners
Argentina (6 berths)	Defensa y Justicia (Argentina 2)	Group stage	2021 Copa de la Liga Profesional and Primera División aggregate table best team not qualified for 2022 Copa Libertadores
Argentina (6 berths)	Independiente (Argentina 3)	Group stage	2021 Copa de la Liga Profesional and Primera División aggregate table 2nd best team not qualified for 2022 Copa Libertadores
Argentina (6 berths)	Lanús (Argentina 4)	Group stage	2021 Copa de la Liga Profesional and Primera División aggregate table 3rd best team not qualified for 2022 Copa Libertadores
Argentina (6 berths)	Racing (Argentina 5)	Group stage	2021 Copa de la Liga Profesional and Primera División aggregate table 4th best team not qualified for 2022 Copa Libertadores
Argentina (6 berths)	Unión (Argentina 6)	Group stage	2021 Copa de la Liga Profesional and Primera División aggregate table 5th best team not qualified for 2022 Copa Libertadores
Bolivia (4 berths)	Royal Pari (Bolivia 1)	First stage	2021 Primera División 5th place
Bolivia (4 berths)	Oriente Petrolero (Bolivia 2)	First stage	2021 Primera División 6th place
Bolivia (4 berths)	Jorge Wilstermann (Bolivia 3)	First stage	2021 Primera División 7th place
Bolivia (4 berths)	Guabirá (Bolivia 4)	First stage	2021 Primera División 8th place
Brazil (6 berths)	Atlético Goianiense (Brazil 1)	Group stage	2021 Campeonato Brasileiro Série A best team not qualified for 2022 Copa Libertadores
Brazil (6 berths)	Santos (Brazil 2)	Group stage	2021 Campeonato Brasileiro Série A 2nd best team not qualified for 2022 Copa Libertadores
Brazil (6 berths)	Ceará (Brazil 3)	Group stage	2021 Campeonato Brasileiro Série A 3rd best team not qualified for 2022 Copa Libertadores
Brazil (6 berths)	Internacional (Brazil 4)	Group stage	2021 Campeonato Brasileiro Série A 4th best team not qualified for 2022 Copa Libertadores
Brazil (6 berths)	São Paulo (Brazil 5)	Group stage	2021 Campeonato Brasileiro Série A 5th best team not qualified for 2022 Copa Libertadores
Brazil (6 berths)	Cuiabá (Brazil 6)	Group stage	2021 Campeonato Brasileiro Série A 6th best team not qualified for 2022 Copa Libertadores
Chile (4 berths)	Unión La Calera (Chile 1)	First stage	2021 Primera División best team not qualified for 2022 Copa Libertadores
Chile (4 berths)	Unión Española (Chile 2)	First stage	2021 Primera División 2nd best team not qualified for 2022 Copa Libertadores
Chile (4 berths)	Deportes Antofagasta (Chile 3)	First stage	2021 Primera División 3rd best team not qualified for 2022 Copa Libertadores
Chile (4 berths)	Ñublense (Chile 4)	First stage	2021 Primera División 4th best team not qualified for 2022 Copa Libertadores
Colombia (4 berths)	Junior (Colombia 1)	First stage	2021 Primera A aggregate table best team not qualified for 2022 Copa Libertadores
Colombia (4 berths)	América de Cali (Colombia 2)	First stage	2021 Primera A aggregate table 2nd best team not qualified for 2022 Copa Libertadores
Colombia (4 berths)	La Equidad (Colombia 3)	First stage	2021 Primera A aggregate table 3rd best team not qualified for 2022 Copa Libertadores
Colombia (4 berths)	Independiente Medellín (Colombia 4)	First stage	2020 Copa Colombia champions
Ecuador (4 berths)	9 de Octubre (Ecuador 1)	First stage	2021 Serie A aggregate table best team not qualified for 2022 Copa Libertadores
Ecuador (4 berths)	LDU Quito (Ecuador 2)	First stage	2021 Serie A aggregate table 2nd best team not qualified for 2022 Copa Libertadores
Ecuador (4 berths)	Mushuc Runa (Ecuador 3)	First stage	2021 Serie A aggregate table 3rd best team not qualified for 2022 Copa Libertadores
Ecuador (4 berths)	Delfín (Ecuador 4)	First stage	2021 Serie A aggregate table 4th best team not qualified for 2022 Copa Libertadores
Paraguay (4 berths)	Nacional (Paraguay 1)	First stage	2021 Primera División aggregate table best team not qualified for 2022 Copa Libertadores
Paraguay (4 berths)	Guaireña (Paraguay 2)	First stage	2021 Primera División aggregate table 2nd best team not qualified for 2022 Copa Libertadores
Paraguay (4 berths)	Sol de América (Paraguay 3)	First stage	2021 Copa Paraguay runners-up
Paraguay (4 berths)	General Caballero (JLM) (Paraguay 4)	First stage	2021 División Intermedia champions
Peru (4 berths)	Melgar (Peru 1)	First stage	2021 Liga 1 aggregate table best team not qualified for 2022 Copa Libertadores
Peru (4 berths)	Cienciano (Peru 2)	First stage	2021 Liga 1 aggregate table 2nd best team not qualified for 2022 Copa Libertadores
Peru (4 berths)	Sport Boys (Peru 3)	First stage	2021 Liga 1 aggregate table 3rd best team not qualified for 2022 Copa Libertadores
Peru (4 berths)	Ayacucho (Peru 4)	First stage	2021 Liga 1 aggregate table 4th best team not qualified for 2022 Copa Libertadores
Uruguay (4 berths)	Cerro Largo (Uruguay 1)	First stage	2021 Primera División aggregate table best team not qualified for 2022 Copa Libertadores
Uruguay (4 berths)	Montevideo Wanderers (Uruguay 2)	First stage	2021 Primera División aggregate table 2nd best team not qualified for 2022 Copa Libertadores
Uruguay (4 berths)	Liverpool (Uruguay 3)	First stage	2021 Primera División aggregate table 3rd best team not qualified for 2022 Copa Libertadores
Uruguay (4 berths)	River Plate (Uruguay 4)	First stage	2021 Primera División aggregate table 4th best team not qualified for 2022 Copa Libertadores
Venezuela (4 berths)	Deportivo La Guaira (Venezuela 1)	First stage	2021 Primera División Fase Final A 5th place
Venezuela (4 berths)	Estudiantes de Mérida (Venezuela 2)	First stage	2021 Primera División Fase Final A 6th place
Venezuela (4 berths)	Metropolitanos (Venezuela 3)	First stage	2021 Primera División Fase Final B winners
Venezuela (4 berths)	Hermanos Colmenarez (Venezuela 4)	First stage	2021 Primera División Fase Final B runners-up

Notes

1. Ecuador (ECU): The 2021 Copa Ecuador was cancelled due to the effects of the COVID-19 pandemic in Ecuador, therefore the Ecuador 4 berth which was originally allocated to the winners of said competition passed over to the 2021 Serie A aggregate table 4th best team not qualified for the 2022 Copa Libertadores.

A further 12 teams eliminated from the 2022 Copa Libertadores were transferred to the Copa Sudamericana, entering the group stage and the round of 16.

Teams eliminated in third stage	Entry stage
(Brazil) Fluminense	Group stage
(Chile) Everton	Group stage
(Ecuador) Universidad Católica	Group stage
(Ecuador) Barcelona	Group stage
Third-placed teams in group stage	Entry stage
(Venezuela) Deportivo Táchira	Round of 16
(Bolivia) The Strongest	Round of 16
(Uruguay) Nacional	Round of 16
(Ecuador) Independiente del Valle	Round of 16
(Colombia) Deportivo Cali	Round of 16
(Chile) Colo-Colo	Round of 16
(Paraguay) Olimpia	Round of 16
(Chile) Universidad Católica	Round of 16

== Schedule ==
The schedule of the competition was as follows:

Stage	Draw date	First leg	Second leg
First stage	20 December 2021	8–10 March 2022	15–17 March 2022
Group stage	25 March 2022	Matchday 1: 5–7 April 2022; Matchday 2: 12–14 April 2022; Matchday 3: 26–28 April 2022; Matchday 4: 3–5 May 2022; Matchday 5: 17–19 May 2022; Matchday 6: 24–26 May 2022	
Round of 16	27 May 2022	28–30 June 2022	5–7 July 2022
Quarter-finals	27 May 2022	2–4 August 2022	9–11 August 2022
Semi-finals	27 May 2022	31 August – 1 September 2022	7–8 September 2022
Final	27 May 2022	1 October 2022 at Estadio Mario Alberto Kempes, Córdoba	

== Draws ==
Location of teams of the 2022 Copa Sudamericana.
Brown: Group A; Red: Group B; Orange: Group C;
Yellow: Group D; Green: Group E; Blue: Group F;
Purple: Group G; Pink: Group H; White: First stage;
Turquoise: Round of 16 entrants.
(L) Teams transferred from the 2022 Copa Libertadores.

The draw for the first stage was held on 20 December 2021, 12:00 PYST (UTC−3), at the CONMEBOL Convention Centre in Luque, Paraguay. For the first stage, the 32 teams involved were divided into eight pots according to their national association.

The 32 teams were drawn into 16 ties, with the four teams from each national association being drawn against a rival from the same association in two ties per association and the first team drawn in each tie hosting the second leg. The draw for the group stage was held on 25 March 2022, 12:00 PYST (UTC−3), at the CONMEBOL Convention Centre in Luque, Paraguay. For the group stage, the 32 teams were drawn into eight groups (Groups A–H) of four containing a team from each of the four pots. Teams from the same association could not be drawn into the same group.

Group stage draw
Pot 1	Pot 2	Pot 3	Pot 4
(Brazil) Santos (8); (Argentina) Independiente (10); (Brazil) São Paulo (13); (Brazil) Internacional (17); (Argentina) Racing (19); (Ecuador) LDU Quito (20); (Argentina) Lanús (24); (Colombia) Junior (25)	(Argentina) Defensa y Justicia (36); (Bolivia) Jorge Wilstermann (39); (Colombia) Independiente Medellín (55); (Peru) Melgar (66); (Uruguay) Montevideo Wanderers (73); (Bolivia) Oriente Petrolero (84); (Venezuela) Deportivo La Guaira (89); (Chile) Unión La Calera (91)	(Uruguay) River Plate (95); (Brazil) Atlético Goianiense (100); (Brazil) Ceará (107); (Argentina) Banfield (113); (Venezuela) Metropolitanos (131); (Argentina) Unión (142); (Peru) Ayacucho (190); (Ecuador) 9 de Octubre (191)	(Chile) Deportes Antofagasta (197); (Paraguay) Guaireña (223); (Brazil) Cuiabá (253); (Paraguay) General Caballero (JLM) (No rank); (Brazil) Fluminense (30); (Chile) Everton (165); (Ecuador) Universidad Católica (120); (Ecuador) Barcelona (18)

Notes

1. ^{CLQ3} The Copa Libertadores third stage losers were seeded in Pot 4.

The draw for the round of 16 was held on 27 May 2022, 12:00 PYT (UTC−4) at the CONMEBOL Convention Center in Luque, Paraguay. For the round of 16, the 16 teams were drawn into eight ties (A–H) between a Copa Sudamericana group winner (Pot 1) and a Copa Libertadores group third-placed team (Pot 2), with the group winners hosting the second leg. Teams from the same association or the same group could be drawn into the same tie (Regulations Article 2.2.3.2).

== First stage ==
In the first stage, each tie was played on a home-and-away two-legged basis. If tied on aggregate, extra time was not played, and a penalty shoot-out was used to determine the winner (Regulations Article 2.4.2).

The 16 winners of the first stage advanced to the group stage to join the 12 teams directly qualified for that stage (six from Argentina and six from Brazil), and four teams transferred from the Copa Libertadores (the four teams eliminated in the third stage of qualifying).

Team 1	Agg.	Team 2	1st leg	2nd leg
Jorge Wilstermann (Bolivia)	4–3	(Bolivia) Guabirá	4–0	0–3
Royal Pari (Bolivia)	2–6	(Bolivia) Oriente Petrolero	2–3	0–3
Unión Española (Chile)	2–2 (1–4 p)	(Chile) Deportes Antofagasta	1–2	1–0
Ñublense (Chile)	1–2	(Chile) Unión La Calera	0–0	1–2
La Equidad (Colombia)	1–3	(Colombia) Junior	0–0	1–3
Independiente Medellín (Colombia)	3–3 (3–1 p)	(Colombia) América de Cali	2–1	1–2
Delfín (Ecuador)	1–3	(Ecuador) 9 de Octubre	1–1	0–2
Mushuc Runa (Ecuador)	1–3	(Ecuador) LDU Quito	0–2	1–1
Nacional (Paraguay)	0–1	(Paraguay) Guaireña	0–1	0–0
Sol de América (Paraguay)	1–5	(Paraguay) General Caballero (JLM)	0–3	1–2
Ayacucho (Peru)	4–3	(Peru) Sport Boys	2–0	2–3
Cienciano (Peru)	1–2	(Peru) Melgar	1–1	0–1
Montevideo Wanderers (Uruguay)	3–1	(Uruguay) Cerro Largo	2–1	1–0
Liverpool (Uruguay)	0–3	(Uruguay) River Plate	0–1	0–2
Estudiantes de Mérida (Venezuela)	0–6	(Venezuela) Metropolitanos	0–2	0–4
Hermanos Colmenarez (Venezuela)	2–3	(Venezuela) Deportivo La Guaira	2–0	0–3

== Group stage ==
In the group stage, each group was played on a home-and-away round-robin basis. The teams were ranked according to the following criteria: 1. Points (3 points for a win, 1 point for a draw, and 0 points for a loss); 2. Goal difference; 3. Goals scored; 4. Away goals scored; 5. CONMEBOL ranking (Regulations Article 2.4.2).

The winners of each group advanced to the round of 16 of the final stages.

=== Group A ===
Pos	Team	Pld	W	D	L	GF	GA	GD	Pts	Qualification	LAN	BSC	WAN	MET
1	(Argentina) Lanús	6	3	2	1	7	4	+3	11	Round of 16	—	3–1	1–2	1–0
2	(Ecuador) Barcelona	6	2	3	1	9	8	+1	9		1–1	—	4–2	1–0
3	(Uruguay) Montevideo Wanderers	6	2	2	2	6	7	−1	8		0–1	0–0	—	1–1
4	(Venezuela) Metropolitanos	6	0	3	3	3	6	−3	3		0–0	2–2	0–1	—

Source: CONMEBOL

=== Group B ===
Pos	Team	Pld	W	D	L	GF	GA	GD	Pts	Qualification	MEL	RAC	CUI	RIV
1	(Peru) Melgar	6	4	0	2	10	6	+4	12	Round of 16	—	3–1	3–1	2–0
2	(Argentina) Racing	6	4	0	2	7	5	+2	12		1–0	—	2–0	0–1
3	(Brazil) Cuiabá	6	2	0	4	7	10	−3	6		2–0	1–2	—	1–2
4	(Uruguay) River Plate	6	2	0	4	5	8	−3	6		1–2	0–1	1–2	—

Source: CONMEBOL

=== Group C ===
Pos	Team	Pld	W	D	L	GF	GA	GD	Pts	Qualification	SAN	ULC	UCA	BAN
1	(Brazil) Santos	6	3	2	1	7	5	+2	11	Round of 16	—	1–0	3–2	1–1
2	(Chile) Unión La Calera	6	3	2	1	6	4	+2	11		1–1	—	3–2	1–0
3	(Ecuador) Universidad Católica	6	1	2	3	7	8	−1	5		0–1	0–0	—	2–0
4	(Argentina) Banfield	6	1	2	3	3	6	−3	5		1–0	0–1	1–1	—

Source: CONMEBOL

=== Group D ===
Pos	Team	Pld	W	D	L	GF	GA	GD	Pts	Qualification	SPA	EVE	AYA	WIL
1	(Brazil) São Paulo	6	5	1	0	12	3	+9	16	Round of 16	—	2–0	1–0	3–0
2	(Chile) Everton	6	3	2	1	7	4	+3	11		0–0	—	2–1	1–1
3	(Peru) Ayacucho	6	1	1	4	5	8	−3	4		2–3	0–2	—	0–0
4	(Bolivia) Jorge Wilstermann	6	0	2	4	2	11	−9	2		1–3	0–2	0–2	—

Source: CONMEBOL

=== Group E ===
Pos	Team	Pld	W	D	L	GF	GA	GD	Pts	Qualification	INT	GUA	DIM	9OC
1	(Brazil) Internacional	6	3	3	0	12	5	+7	12	Round of 16	—	1–1	2–0	5–1
2	(Paraguay) Guaireña	6	2	4	0	10	8	+2	10		1–1	—	3–3	1–0
3	(Colombia) Independiente Medellín	6	1	2	3	8	11	−3	5		0–1	1–1	—	2–1
4	(Ecuador) 9 de Octubre	6	1	1	4	9	15	−6	4		2–2	2–3	3–2	—

Source: CONMEBOL

=== Group F ===
Pos	Team	Pld	W	D	L	GF	GA	GD	Pts	Qualification	ACG	LDQ	ANT	DYJ
1	(Brazil) Atlético Goianiense	6	4	1	1	11	5	+6	13	Round of 16	—	4–0	1–0	3–2
2	(Ecuador) LDU Quito	6	3	2	1	11	9	+2	11		1–1	—	4–0	2–2
3	(Chile) Deportes Antofagasta	6	2	0	4	6	11	−5	6		2–1	1–2	—	1–3
4	(Argentina) Defensa y Justicia	6	1	1	4	8	11	−3	4		0–1	1–2	0–2	—

Source: CONMEBOL

=== Group G ===
Pos	Team	Pld	W	D	L	GF	GA	GD	Pts	Qualification	CEA	IND	GCM	DLG
1	(Brazil) Ceará	6	6	0	0	17	1	+16	18	Round of 16	—	2–1	6–0	3–0
2	(Argentina) Independiente	6	4	0	2	13	4	+9	12		0–2	—	2–0	4–0
3	(Paraguay) General Caballero (JLM)	6	1	1	4	2	15	−13	4		0–2	0–4	—	1–1
4	(Venezuela) Deportivo La Guaira	6	0	1	5	1	13	−12	1		0–2	0–2	0–1	—

Source: CONMEBOL

=== Group H ===
Pos	Team	Pld	W	D	L	GF	GA	GD	Pts	Qualification	UNI	FLU	JUN	ORI
1	(Argentina) Unión	6	3	3	0	10	2	+8	12	Round of 16	—	0–0	1–1	2–0
2	(Brazil) Fluminense	6	3	2	1	15	5	+10	11		0–0	—	2–1	3–0
3	(Colombia) Junior	6	3	1	2	10	8	+2	10		0–4	3–0	—	2–0
4	(Bolivia) Oriente Petrolero	6	0	0	6	3	23	−20	0		1–3	1–10	1–3	—

Source: CONMEBOL

== Final stages ==
Starting from the round of 16, the teams played a single-elimination tournament with the following rules:

- In the round of 16, quarter-finals and semi-finals, each tie was played on a home-and-away two-legged basis, with the higher-seeded team hosting the second leg (Regulations Article 2.2.3). If tied on aggregate, extra time was not played, and a penalty shoot-out was used to determine the winners (Regulations Article 2.4.4).
- The final was played as a single match at a venue pre-selected by CONMEBOL, with the higher-seeded team designated as the "home" team for administrative purposes (Regulations Article 2.2.6). If tied after regulation, 30 minutes of extra time was played. If still tied after extra time, a penalty shoot-out was used to determine the winners (Regulations Article 2.4.5).

=== Seeding ===
Starting from the round of 16, the teams are seeded according to their results in the group stage, with the Copa Sudamericana group winners (Pot 1) seeded 1–8, and the Copa Libertadores group third-placed teams (Pot 2) seeded 9–16.

Seed	Grp	Team	Pld	W	D	L	GF	GA	GD	Pts	Round of 16 draw
1	SG	(Brazil) Ceará	6	6	0	0	17	1	+16	18	Pot 1
2	SD	(Brazil) São Paulo	6	5	1	0	12	3	+9	16	Pot 1
3	SF	(Brazil) Atlético Goianiense	6	4	1	1	11	5	+6	13	Pot 1
4	SH	(Argentina) Unión	6	3	3	0	10	2	+8	12	Pot 1
5	SE	(Brazil) Internacional	6	3	3	0	12	5	+7	12	Pot 1
6	SB	(Peru) Melgar	6	4	0	2	10	6	+4	12	Pot 1
7	SA	(Argentina) Lanús	6	3	2	1	7	4	+3	11	Pot 1
8	SC	(Brazil) Santos	6	3	2	1	7	5	+2	11	Pot 1
9	LE	(Colombia) Deportivo Cali	6	2	2	2	7	4	+3	8	Pot 2
10	LD	(Ecuador) Independiente del Valle	6	2	2	2	9	7	+2	8	Pot 2
11	LG	(Paraguay) Olimpia	6	2	2	2	4	4	0	8	Pot 2
12	LC	(Uruguay) Nacional	6	2	1	3	7	7	0	7	Pot 2
13	LF	(Chile) Colo-Colo	6	2	1	3	9	13	−4	7	Pot 2
14	LA	(Venezuela) Deportivo Táchira	6	2	1	3	8	14	−6	7	Pot 2
15	LB	(Bolivia) The Strongest	6	1	3	2	8	7	+1	6	Pot 2
16	LH	(Chile) Universidad Católica	6	1	1	4	5	10	−5	4	Pot 2

Source: CONMEBOL
Rules for classification: 1) Higher position in group; 2) Points; 3) Goal difference; 4) Goals scored; 5) Away goals scored; 6) CONMEBOL ranking (Regulations Article 2.4.3).

=== Bracket ===
The bracket was decided based on the round of 16 draw, which was held on 27 May 2022.

Round of 16
12	(Uruguay) Nacional	2	2	4
4	(Argentina) Unión	0	1	1
11	(Paraguay) Olimpia	2	0	2 (3)
3	(Brazil) Atlético Goianiense (p)	0	2	2 (5)
16	(Chile) Universidad Católica	2	1	3
2	(Brazil) São Paulo	4	4	8
15	(Bolivia) The Strongest	1	0	1
1	(Brazil) Ceará	2	3	5
14	(Venezuela) Deportivo Táchira (p)	1	1	2 (4)
8	(Brazil) Santos	1	1	2 (2)
10	(Ecuador) Independiente del Valle	2	0	2
7	(Argentina) Lanús	1	0	1
9	(Colombia) Deportivo Cali	0	1	1
6	(Peru) Melgar	0	2	2
13	(Chile) Colo-Colo	2	1	3
5	(Brazil) Internacional	0	4	4

Quarter-finals
12	(Uruguay) Nacional	0	0	0
3	(Brazil) Atlético Goianiense	1	3	4
2	(Brazil) São Paulo (p)	1	1	2 (4)
1	(Brazil) Ceará	0	2	2 (3)
14	(Venezuela) Deportivo Táchira	0	1	1
10	(Ecuador) Independiente del Valle	1	4	5
6	(Peru) Melgar (p)	0	0	0 (3)
5	(Brazil) Internacional	0	0	0 (1)

Semi-finals
3	(Brazil) Atlético Goianiense	3	0	3 (2)
2	(Brazil) São Paulo (p)	1	2	3 (4)
10	(Ecuador) Independiente del Valle	3	3	6
6	(Peru) Melgar	0	0	0

Final
1 October – Córdoba
2	(Brazil) São Paulo	0
10	(Ecuador) Independiente del Valle	2

=== Round of 16 ===
Team 1	Agg.	Team 2	1st leg	2nd leg
Deportivo Táchira (Venezuela)	2–2 (4–2 p)	(Brazil) Santos	1–1	1–1
Nacional (Uruguay)	4–1	(Argentina) Unión	2–0	2–1
Universidad Católica (Chile)	3–8	(Brazil) São Paulo	2–4	1–4
Colo-Colo (Chile)	3–4	(Brazil) Internacional	2–0	1–4
Deportivo Cali (Colombia)	1–2	(Peru) Melgar	0–0	1–2
The Strongest (Bolivia)	1–5	(Brazil) Ceará	1–2	0–3
Olimpia (Paraguay)	2–2 (3–5 p)	(Brazil) Atlético Goianiense	2–0	0–2
Independiente del Valle (Ecuador)	2–1	(Argentina) Lanús	2–1	0–0

=== Quarter-finals ===
Team 1	Agg.	Team 2	1st leg	2nd leg
Deportivo Táchira (Venezuela)	1–5	(Ecuador) Independiente del Valle	0–1	1–4
Nacional (Uruguay)	0–4	(Brazil) Atlético Goianiense	0–1	0–3
São Paulo (Brazil)	2–2 (4–3 p)	(Brazil) Ceará	1–0	1–2
Melgar (Peru)	0–0 (3–1 p)	(Brazil) Internacional	0–0	0–0

=== Semi-finals ===
Team 1	Agg.	Team 2	1st leg	2nd leg
Independiente del Valle (Ecuador)	6–0	(Peru) Melgar	3–0	3–0
Atlético Goianiense (Brazil)	3–3 (2–4 p)	(Brazil) São Paulo	3–1	0–2

=== Final ===
1 October 2022
17:00 UTC−3

São Paulo (Brazil)	0–2	(Ecuador) Independiente del Valle
	Report	Díaz 13'; Faravelli 67'

Estadio Mario Alberto Kempes, Córdoba
Attendance: 24,683
Referee: Wilmar Roldán (Colombia)

== Statistics ==
=== Top scorers ===
Rank	Player	Team	1S1	1S2	GS1	GS2	GS3	GS4	GS5	GS6	⅛F1	⅛F2	QF1	QF2	SF1	SF2	F	Total
1	(Argentina) Bernardo Cuesta	(Peru) Melgar	1	1		2	1	1				2						8
2	(Colombia) Stiven Mendoza	(Brazil) Ceará			1			1	2	1				1				6
3	(Colombia) Miguel Borja	(Colombia) Junior		1		1		1	2									5
3	(Argentina) Lautaro Díaz	(Ecuador) Independiente del Valle												1	1	2	1	5
3	(Brazil) Luciano	(Brazil) São Paulo			1						2	1			1			5
3	(Paraguay) Mario Otazú	(Paraguay) Guaireña			1	1		1	2									5
7	(Argentina) Lucas Albertengo	(Argentina) Defensa y Justicia					1	1	2									4
7	(Ecuador) Alexander Alvarado	(Ecuador) LDU Quito	1	1			2											4
7	(Uruguay) Mauro Méndez	(Uruguay) Montevideo Wanderers			1	1		1	1									4
7	(Argentina) Sebastián Sáez	(Chile) Unión La Calera		1		1		1		1								4
7	(Uruguay) Cristian Techera	(Peru) Ayacucho		1	1	1	1											4

Source: CONMEBOL

== See also ==
- 2022 Copa Libertadores
