= Federico Vera =

Argentine professional footballer

Personal information
- Full name: Federico Gabriel Vera
- Date of birth: 24 March 1998 (age 28)
- Place of birth: Santa Fe, Argentina
- Height: 1.78 m (5 ft 10 in)
- Position: Right-back

Team information
- Current team: Huracán (on loan from Independiente)
- Number: 4

Youth career
- 2004–2010: Banco Provincial
- 2010–2019: Unión Santa Fe

Senior career*
Years	Team	Apps	(Gls)
2019–2024	Unión Santa Fe	124	(0)
2019–2020	→ Sportivo Las Parejas (loan)	11	(1)
2024–	Independiente	43	(0)
2026–	→ Huracán (loan)	6	(0)
- * Club domestic league appearances and goals as of 17:08, 6 July 2026 (UTC)

Federico Gabriel Vera (born 24 March 1998) is an Argentine professional footballer who plays as a right-back for Huracán, on loan from Independiente.

== Career ==
Vera left Banco Provincial to join Unión Santa Fe at the age of twelve, having been scouted at the Tiburón Lagunero tournament. In July 2019, having been an unused substitute in April against San Martín in the Copa de la Superliga, Vera was loaned to Torneo Federal A's Sportivo Las Parejas. He made his senior debut at home to Sportivo Belgrano on 31 August, which preceded his first goal arriving against Central Norte on 22 September. After thirteen appearances, Vera returned to Unión and subsequently made his bow in the Copa Sudamericana versus Emelec; starting both legs.

On 9 August 2024, Vera signed for Independiente.

== Career statistics ==
As of 14 November 2020.

Appearances and goals by club, season and competition
Club	Season	League			Cup		League Cup		Continental		Other		Total	
Club	Season	Division	Apps	Goals	Apps	Goals	Apps	Goals	Apps	Goals	Apps	Goals	Apps	Goals
Unión Santa Fe	2019–20	Primera División	0	0	0	0	0	0	0	0	0	0	0	0
Unión Santa Fe	2020–21 (Note: Soccerway counts Copa de la Liga Profesional appearances as league appearances.)	Primera División	1	0	0	0	0	0	2 (Note: Appearance(s) in the Copa Sudamericana)	0	0	0	3	0
Unión Santa Fe	Total		1	0	0	0	0	0	2	0	0	0	3	0
Sportivo Las Parejas (loan)	2019–20	Torneo Federal A	11	1	2	0	—		—		0	0	13	1
Career total			12	1	2	0	0	0	2	0	0	0	16	1
