= Lautaro Díaz =

Argentine footballer (born 1998)

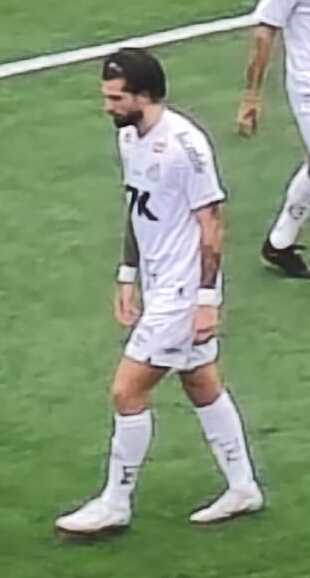
- Díaz playing for Santos in 2025

Personal information
- Full name: Lautaro Ariel Díaz
- Date of birth: 21 May 1998 (age 28)
- Place of birth: Buenos Aires, Argentina
- Height: 1.81 m (5 ft 11 in)
- Position: Forward

Team information
- Current team: Racing
- Number: 32

Youth career
- Estudiantes BA

Senior career*
Years	Team	Apps	(Gls)
2019–2022	Estudiantes BA	24	(2)
2021–2022	→ Villa Dálmine (loan)	31	(7)
2022	→ Independiente del Valle (loan)	11	(0)
2023–2024	Independiente del Valle	28	(4)
2024–	Cruzeiro	30	(2)
2025–2026	→ Santos (loan)	30	(4)
2026–	→ Racing (loan)	14	(0)
- * Club domestic league appearances and goals as of 18:14, 8 November 2026 (UTC)

Lautaro Ariel Díaz (born 21 May 1998) is an Argentine footballer who plays for Racing, on loan from Cruzeiro. Mainly a forward, he can also play as a winger.

== Club career ==
=== Estudiantes de Buenos Aires ===
Born in Buenos Aires, Díaz was a youth exponent of hometown side Estudiantes de Buenos Aires, making his first team debut on 8 May 2019 in a 2–1 Primera B Metropolitana home loss against All Boys. He featured in another two matches during the season as his side achieved promotion to Primera Nacional, and scored his first goal on 10 January 2021, netting the winner in a 2–1 away success over Ferro Carril Oeste.

==== Loan to Villa Dálmine ====
On 21 July 2021, Díaz moved to fellow second division team Villa Dálmine on loan until December 2022. After only one goal in the 2021 season, he scored six times during the first half of the 2022 campaign before leaving in June 2022.

=== Independiente del Valle ===
On 14 June 2022, Díaz moved abroad and agreed to a one-year loan deal with Ecuadorian Serie A side Independiente del Valle. He impressed with the club in the 2022 Copa Sudamericana, scoring five goals (one of them in the Final against São Paulo, where he was named man-of-the-match) and helping the side to lift their second trophy in the competition.

On 10 November 2022, del Valle announced that they activated Díaz's buyout clause, effective as of the following 1 January.

=== Cruzeiro ===
On 1 July 2024, Campeonato Brasileiro Série A side Cruzeiro announced the signing of Díaz on a four-year contract. He struggled with fitness issues upon arriving at the club, and saw his playing time diminish in the 2025 season.

==== Loan to Santos ====
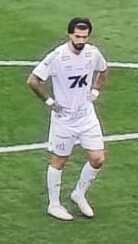
Díaz in action for Santos in 2025

On 2 September 2025, Díaz moved to Santos in the Brazilian top tier, on loan until July of the following year. He made his club debut twelve days later, starting in a 1–1 away draw against Atlético Mineiro.

On 9 July 2026, Díaz's loan was cut short.

== Personal life ==
Díaz's father Roberto was also a footballer and a forward. He was a part of the Argentina squad in the 1979 Copa América. After his proeminence at Independiente del Valle, he was often compared to Jack Grealish due to his looks.

== Career statistics ==
As of 31 May 2026

Club	Season	League			Cup		International		State league		Other		Total	
Club	Season	Division	Apps	Goals	Apps	Goals	Apps	Goals	Apps	Goals	Apps	Goals	Apps	Goals
Estudiantes BA	2018–19	Primera B Metropolitana	3	0	—		—		—		—		3	0
Estudiantes BA	2019–20	Primera Nacional	6	0	2	0	—		—		—		8	0
Estudiantes BA	2020	Primera Nacional	6	1	—		—		—		—		6	1
Estudiantes BA	2021	Primera Nacional	9	1	—		—		—		—		9	1
Estudiantes BA	Total		24	2	2	0	—		—		—		26	2
Villa Dálmine (loan)	2021	Primera Nacional	16	1	—		—		—		—		16	1
Villa Dálmine (loan)	2022	Primera Nacional	15	6	—		—		—		—		15	6
Villa Dálmine (loan)	Total		31	7	—		—		—		—		31	7
Independiente del Valle	2022	Ecuadorian Serie A	11	0	—		6 (Note: Appearance(s) in Copa Sudamericana)	5	—		—		17	5
Independiente del Valle	2023	Ecuadorian Serie A	23	4	4	3	7 (Note: Appearance(s) in Copa Libertadores)	3	—		4 (Note: One appearance in Supercopa Ecuador, two appearances in Recopa Sudamericana, one appearance and one goal in UEFA–CONMEBOL Club Challenge)	1	38	11
Independiente del Valle	2024	Ecuadorian Serie A	5	0	0	0	3	3	—		—		8	3
Independiente del Valle	Total		39	4	4	3	16	11	—		4	1	63	19
Cruzeiro	2024	Série A	18	1	—		6	1	—		—		24	2
Cruzeiro	2025	Série A	6	0	0	0	6	1	6 (Note: Appearance(s) in Campeonato Mineiro)	1	—		18	2
Cruzeiro	Total		24	1	0	0	12	2	6	1	—		42	4
Santos (loan)	2025	Série A	15	3	—		—		—		—		15	3
Santos (loan)	2026	Série A	8	1	0	0	4	0	7 (Note: Appearance(s) in Campeonato Paulista)	0	—		19	1
Santos (loan)	Total		23	4	0	0	4	0	7	0	—		34	4
Career total			141	18	6	3	32	13	13	1	4	1	196	36

== Honours ==
Independiente del Valle

- Copa Sudamericana: 2022
