= Mauro Méndez =

Uruguayan footballer (born 1999)

Personal information
- Full name: Mauro Andrés Méndez Acosta
- Date of birth: 17 January 1999 (age 27)
- Place of birth: Salto, Uruguay
- Height: 1.79 m (5 ft 10 in)
- Position: Forward

Team information
- Current team: Tigre
- Number: 33

Youth career
- Universitario de Salto
- Ferro Carril de Salto
- 2015–2017: Defensor Sporting
- 2017–2019: Montevideo Wanderers

Senior career*
| Years | Team | Apps | (Gls) |
| 2019–2022 | Montevideo Wanderers | 85 | (23) |
| 2022–2026 | Estudiantes | 58 | (9) |
| 2025–2026 | → Banfield (loan) | 31 | (9) |
| 2026– | Tigre | 8 | (1) |
- * Club domestic league appearances and goals as of 17:58, 9 November 2026 (UTC)

Mauro Andrés Méndez Acosta (born 17 January 1999) is a Uruguayan professional footballer who plays as a forward for Tigre.

== Career ==
Méndez is a former youth player of Defensor Sporting. He joined Montevideo Wanderers in February 2017 and made his professional debut for the club on 2 June 2019 in a 0–3 league defeat against Cerro.

On July 28, 2022, Estudiantes de La Plata signed the 23-year-old striker from the Montevideo Wanderers club for 1,700,000 dollars for 70% of the record, signing a contract until June 2025.

== Career statistics ==
=== Club ===
As of 30 July 2022

Appearances and goals by club, season and competition
| Club | Season | League | | | Cup | | Continental | | Other | | Total | |
| Club | Season | Division | Apps | Goals | Apps | Goals | Apps | Goals | Apps | Goals | Apps | Goals |
|---|---|---|---|---|---|---|---|---|---|---|---|---|
| Montevideo Wanderers | 2019 | Uruguayan Primera División | 14 | 1 | — | | 1 (Note: Appearance(s) in Copa Sudamericana.) | 0 | — | | 15 | 1 |
| Montevideo Wanderers | 2020 | Uruguayan Primera División | 29 | 7 | — | | — | | 1 (Note: Appearance in Torneo Intermedio final.) | 0 | 30 | 7 |
| Montevideo Wanderers | 2021 | Uruguayan Primera División | 22 | 4 | — | | 2 (Note: Appearances in Copa Libertadores.) | 0 | 1 (Note: Appearance in Supercopa Uruguaya.) | 0 | 25 | 4 |
| Montevideo Wanderers | 2022 | Uruguayan Primera División | 20 | 11 | 0 | 0 | 8 | 4 | — | | 28 | 15 |
| Montevideo Wanderers | Total | | 85 | 23 | 0 | 0 | 11 | 4 | 2 | 0 | 98 | 27 |
| Estudiantes | 2022 | Argentine Primera División | 1 | 0 | 0 | 0 | 0 | 0 | 0 | 0 | 1 | 0 |
| Career total | | | 86 | 23 | 0 | 0 | 11 | 4 | 2 | 0 | 99 | 27 |

== Honours ==
Estudiantes

- Copa Argentina: 2023
- Copa de la Liga Profesional: 2024
- Primera División: 2025 Clausura
