= Ivo Méndez =

Bolivian football referee (born 1991)

- Full name: Ivo Méndez
- Born: 18 March 1991 (age 35); Santa Cruz de la Sierra, Bolivia

Domestic
Years	League	Role
2012–	FBF División Profesional	Referee

International
Years	League	Role
2017–	FIFA listed	Referee

Ivo Méndez (born 18 March 1991) is a Bolivian football referee, serving as a FIFA-listed referee since 2017.

== Career ==
Born in Santa Cruz de la Sierra, Méndez began his refereeing career at a national level in Bolivia in 2012, by ascending to the FBF División Profesional –the country's top league– and leading his first match in December of that year between C.A. Nacional Potosí and C.D. Jorge Wilstermann. At local level, Méndez is considered one of the most important and renowned of his generation, and has led prominent matches, including the Clásico Cruceño between Oriente Petrolero and Club Blooming, and the Clásico Paceño between Club Bolívar and The Strongest.

Following his FIFA designation in 2017, Méndez began overseeing games at regional level, including the Copa Libertadores, where, as of February 2025, he had refereed a total of six matches, showing (in the first five games) 23 yellow cards and sanctioning two penalty kicks. He has also taken part in the Bolivian representation at the Copa Sudamericana and the CONMEBOL qualification for the FIFA World Cup, as well as the 2020 CONMEBOL Pre-Olympic Tournament in Colombia, where he led two matches: Argentina U-23 v. Venezuela U-23 and Chile U-23 v. Ecuador U-23.

Beyond his continental field, Méndez most prominent competitions include youth FIFA World Cups, including the 2019 FIFA U-17 World Cup in Brazil, the 2023 FIFA U-20 World Cup in Indonesia, and the 2025 FIFA U-17 World Cup in Qatar. In senior national tournaments, he was also part of the officials at the 2024 Copa América held in the United States.

== Selected record ==
2023 FIFA U-17 World Cup – Indonesia
Date	Match	Result	Round
13 November 2023	Uzbekistan – Canada	3–0	Group stage
17 November 2023	Iran – New Caledonia	5–0	Group stage
2025 FIFA U-17 World Cup – Qatar
Date	Match	Result	Round
3 November 2025	Tunisia – Fiji	6–0	Group stage
6 November 2025	United Arab Emirates – Croatia	0–3	Group stage
9 November 2025	Belgium – Tunisia	2–0	Group stage
18 November 2025	Italy – Uzbekistan	3–2	Round of 16
