= Hernán Rivero =

Argentine footballer

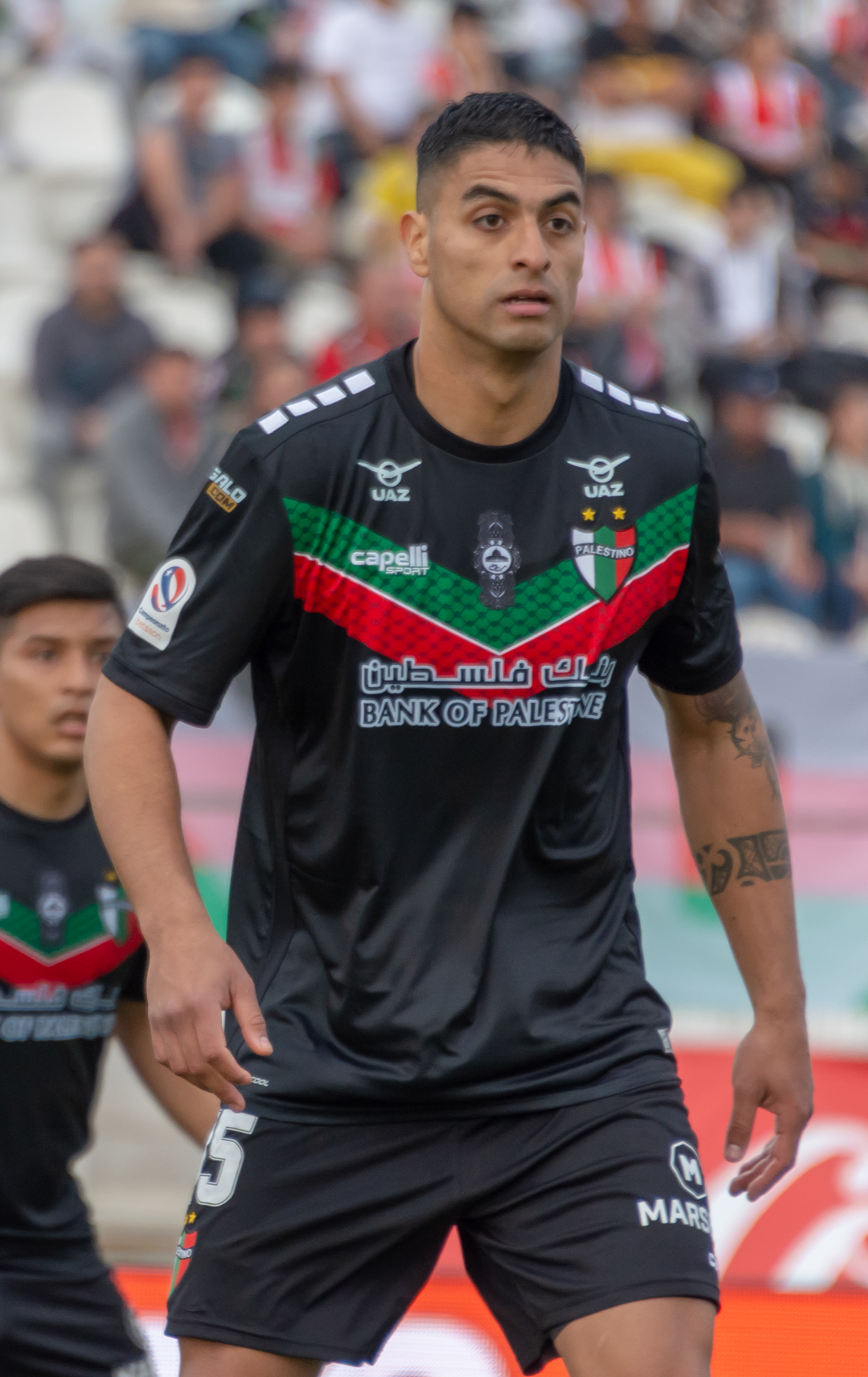
- Rivero with Palestino in 2023

Personal information
- Full name: Daniel Hernán Rivero
- Date of birth: 12 September 1992 (age 34)
- Place of birth: Bella Vista, Corrientes, Argentina
- Height: 1.93 m (6 ft 4 in)
- Position: Forward

Team information
- Current team: Patronato

Senior career*
Years	Team	Apps	(Gls)
2014	Polideportivo General	25	(15)
2014–2015	PSM Fútbol	15	(3)
2015	All Boys	41	(11)
2016	→ Alajuelense (loan)	6	(1)
2017–2018	UAT	23	(9)
2018	Deportivo Pasto	4	(0)
2019	Sportivo Luqueño	14	(5)
2019–2020	Celaya	18	(4)
2020–2022	Montevideo Wanderers	53	(16)
2022–2023	Peñarol	11	(0)
2023	River Plate UY	11	(2)
2023–2024	Palestino	7	(0)
2024	Gimnasia de Jujuy	8	(0)
2024–2026	Chacarita Juniors	42	(9)
2026–	Patronato	5	(0)
- * Club domestic league appearances and goals as of 18:10, 23 March 2026 (UTC)

Daniel Hernán Rivero (born 12 September 1992) is an Argentine footballer who plays as a forward for Patronato.
