= Eugênio Souza =

Brazilian footballer and manager (born 1963)

Personal information
- Full name: Eugênio Carlos de Souza
- Date of birth: 25 April 1963 (age 63)
- Place of birth: Belo Horizonte, Brazil
- Height: 1.79 m (5 ft 10 in)
- Position: Defender

Youth career
- 1975–1982: Cruzeiro

Senior career*
Years	Team	Apps	(Gls)
1982–1988	Cruzeiro	35	(1)
1988–1991	São José-SP		
1989	→ Joinville (loan)		
1992–1993	Vila Nova		
1994	Ceará		
1995	Guarani-MG		

Managerial career
- 1997: América Mineiro U20
- Cruzeiro U20
- 2007: Itaúna
- 2008: Villa Nova
- 2008: Guarani-MG
- 2009: Goytacaz
- 2009–2010: Guarani-MG
- 2011: Nacional-MG
- 2012: Ipatinga
- 2012: Uberlândia
- 2012: Mamoré
- 2013: Araxá
- 2013: Betim
- 2014: Tombense
- 2015: Moto Club
- 2015: URT
- 2015: Caldense
- 2016: Democrata-GV
- 2016: Patrocinense
- 2017: Democrata-GV
- 2017: Ipatinga
- 2018: Nacional de Muriaé
- 2018: Tupi
- 2018: Tombense
- 2019: Villa Nova
- 2019–2020: Tombense
- 2021: Coimbra
- 2021: Ipatinga
- 2022: Betim Futebol
- 2023: Pouso Alegre
- * Club domestic league appearances and goals

Eugênio Carlos de Souza (born 25 April 1963), sometimes known as just Eugênio, is a Brazilian football coach and former player who played as a defender.

== Honours ==
=== Player ===
Cruzeiro

- Campeonato Mineiro: 1982, 1987

Vila Nova

- Campeonato Goiano: 1993

=== Manager ===
Itaúna

- Campeonato Mineiro Segunda Divisão: 2007

Guarani-MG

- Campeonato Mineiro Módulo II: 2010

Tombense

- Campeonato Brasileiro Série D: 2014

Ipatinga

- Campeonato Mineiro Segunda Divisão: 2017
