= Rogério Henrique =

Brazilian football manager (born 1979)

Personal information
- Full name: Rogério Henrique Alves
- Date of birth: 21 March 1979 (age 47)
- Place of birth: Borda da Mata, Brazil
- Position: Defensive midfielder

Team information
- Current team: ABECAT (head coach)

Youth career
- Goiás

Senior career*
Years	Team	Apps	(Gls)
- Goiás
- Grêmio Maringá
- Monte Azul

Managerial career
- 1999–2003: Brasilis (youth)
- 2004–2005: Daeryun High School (youth)
- 2006: Ituano (youth)
- 2007: Pouso Alegre (youth)
- 2008: Tricordiano (youth)
- 2011: Atletico Fiuggi Terme (youth)
- 2012: Funorte (youth)
- 2013: Jacutinga U15
- 2013: Jacutinga U17
- 2014: Santarritense U20
- 2015: Jacutinga U20
- 2016: Jacutinga
- 2016–2017: Patrocinense
- 2017: Paranavaí
- 2017: ABECAT
- 2018: Patrocinense
- 2018: Uberaba
- 2018: Araxá
- 2019: Ipatinga
- 2019: Uberaba
- 2019–2020: Pouso Alegre
- 2020: Atibaia
- 2020–2021: Atlético Três Corações
- 2021: Nacional de Muriaé
- 2021: Patrocinense
- 2022: Lemense
- 2022: Nacional de Muriaé (interim)
- 2022: Betim
- 2023: Costa Rica
- 2023: Patrocinense
- 2023: Pouso Alegre
- 2023: ABECAT
- 2024: Patrocinense
- 2024: Dourados
- 2024: Boa Esporte
- 2024: Costa Rica
- 2024–2025: CEOV
- 2025: Taubaté
- 2026: ABECAT
- 2026–: Uberlândia
- * Club domestic league appearances and goals

Rogério Henrique Alves (born 21 March 1979), known as Rogério Henrique, is a Brazilian football coach and former player who played as a defensive midfielder. He is the current head coach of ABECAT.

== Career ==
Rogério Henrique was born in Borda da Mata, Minas Gerais, and played for Goiás, Grêmio Maringá and Monte Azul as a senior. After retiring at the age of just 20, he worked in the youth sides of Brasilis before moving to South Korea, as a coach of the Daeryun High School football team.

Back to Brazil, Rogério Henrique worked as youth coach of Ituano, Pouso Alegre and Tricordiano before moving to the United States to work in a soccer clinic. In 2011, he also worked at Italian side Atletico Fiuggi Terme.

After returning to Brazil in 2012, Rogério Henrique worked for local youth sides of Funorte, Jacutinga and Santarritense before becoming head coach of Jacutinga's first team for the 2016 Campeonato Mineiro Segunda Divisão. On 24 October 2016, he replaced Eugênio Souza at the helm of Patrocinense in the same division.

After achieving two consecutive promotions with Patrocinense, Rogério Henrique worked at Paranavaí and ABECAT for the remainder of the 2017 season. He returned to Patrocinense for the 2018 Campeonato Mineiro, and later worked at Uberaba and Araxá in that year.

On 31 October 2018, Rogério Henrique was announced Ipatinga head coach, but was sacked the following 24 February. He later returned to Uberaba, being sacked by the club on 8 April 2019.

On 16 May 2019, Rogério Henrique was presented as Pouso Alegre head coach, and won the Mineiro Segunda Divisão with the club before resigning on 28 August 2020. On 5 September, he was named in charge of Atibaia, but returned to his native state in December to take over Atlético Três Corações for the remainder of the 2020 Mineiro Segunda Divisão.

On 26 January 2021, Rogério Henrique was appointed head coach of Nacional de Muriaé, but returned to Patrocinense on 17 March. He began the 2022 campaign in charge of Lemense (returning to the club as they were previously named Atibaia), but was sacked from the side on 6 March of that year.

Rogério Henrique became Nacional de Muriaé's football executive on 14 March 2022, being an interim head coach for one match before returning to coaching duties on 20 June, with Betim Futebol. On 14 December, he was appointed Costa Rica head coach, but resigned on 7 March 2023 to return to Patrocinense.

On 4 July 2023, Rogério Henrique resigned from Patrocinense, and was appointed in charge of Série C side Pouso Alegre just hours later.

On 7 August 2023, Rogério Henrique resigned from Pousão, and returned to his previous club, Patrocinense, for the 2024 season on 19 October.

On March 13, 2026, the coach signed with Uberlândia to compete in the Brazilian Série D, following the dismissal of the previous coach after the team’s elimination in the Copa do Brasil.

== Honours ==
Patrocinense

- Campeonato Mineiro Módulo II: 2017

Pouso Alegre

- Campeonato Mineiro Segunda Divisão: 2019
- Campeonato Mineiro Módulo II: 2020

Costa Rica

- Campeonato Sul-Mato-Grossense: 2023

ABECAT

- Campeonato Goiano Terceira Divisão: 2023

CEOV

- Copa FMF:2024
