= Arilson (footballer, born 1993) =

Brazilian footballer

Personal information
- Full name: Arilson Carlos Alves Baptista
- Date of birth: 30 November 1993 (age 32)
- Place of birth: Juiz de Fora, Brazil
- Height: 1.80 m (5 ft 11 in)
- Position: Defensive midfielder

Team information
- Current team: Santa Cruz
- Number: 8

Senior career*
| Years | Team | Apps | (Gls) |
| 2015 | Tupi | 2 | (0) |
| 2015 | Figueirense-MG | 16 | (0) |
| 2016 | Formiga | 9 | (1) |
| 2016 | Pelotas | 3 | (0) |
| 2016 | Valeriodoce | 8 | (2) |
| 2017 | Pelotas | 15 | (1) |
| 2017 | Poços de Caldas | 14 | (1) |
| 2018 | Caldense | 6 | (0) |
| 2018 | Uberlândia | 7 | (0) |
| 2018 | Athletic-MG | 13 | (1) |
| 2019 | Patrocinense | 17 | (0) |
| 2019 | Mamoré | 7 | (1) |
| 2020 | URT | 2 | (0) |
| 2020 | Athletic-MG | 13 | (0) |
| 2020 | União Luziense | 6 | (2) |
| 2021 | Pouso Alegre | 13 | (1) |
| 2021–2023 | Criciúma | 103 | (7) |
| 2024 | Coritiba | 9 | (0) |
| 2024–2026 | Vila Nova | 44 | (1) |
| 2026 | Betim | 16 | (1) |
| 2026– | Santa Cruz | 7 | (0) |
- * Club domestic league appearances and goals as of 9 November 2026

Arilson Carlos Alves Baptista (born 30 November 1993), simply known as Arilson, is a Brazilian footballer who plays as a defensive midfielder for Santa Cruz.

== Career ==
Born in Juiz de Fora, Minas Gerais, Arilson began his career with amateur teams in his hometown before joining Tupi in late 2014, after a trial period. After being rarely used, he finished the year with Figueirense-MG in the Campeonato Mineiro Segunda Divisão.

Ahead of the 2016 season, Arilson joined Formiga, and subsequently represented Pelotas and Valeriodoce before returning to Pelotas in December.

A regular starter for Pelotas during the 2017 Campeonato Gaúcho Série A2, Arilson returned to his native state due to personal problems and played for Poços de Caldas. On 9 November of that year, he was announced at Caldense, but was released on 15 March 2018.

Arilson continued to play in the state in the following seasons, representing Uberlândia, Athletic-MG (two stints), Patrocinense, Mamoré, União Luziense and Pouso Alegre. With Athletic, he was a part of the club's promotion campaigns in both his spells, as they reached the Campeonato Mineiro.

On 25 May 2021, Arilson was presented at Série C side Criciúma. On 2 September 2022, after helping in their promotion to the Série B and remaining as a starter, he renewed his contract until the end of 2023.

On 11 December 2023, Arilson agreed to a pre-contract with Coritiba.

== Career statistics ==
As of 9 January 2024

| Club | Season | League | | | State League | | Cup | | Continental | | Other | | Total | |
| Club | Season | Division | Apps | Goals | Apps | Goals | Apps | Goals | Apps | Goals | Apps | Goals | Apps | Goals |
|---|---|---|---|---|---|---|---|---|---|---|---|---|---|---|
| Tupi | 2015 | Série C | 0 | 0 | 2 | 0 | 0 | 0 | — | | — | | 2 | 0 |
| Figueirense-MG | 2015 | Mineiro 2ª Divisão | — | | 16 | 0 | — | | — | | — | | 16 | 0 |
| Formiga | 2016 | Mineiro Módulo II | — | | 16 | 0 | — | | — | | — | | 16 | 0 |
| Pelotas | 2016 | Gaúcho Série A2 | — | | 3 | 0 | — | | — | | — | | 3 | 0 |
| Valeriodoce | 2016 | Mineiro 2ª Divisão | — | | 8 | 2 | — | | — | | — | | 8 | 2 |
| Pelotas | 2017 | Gaúcho Série A2 | — | | 15 | 1 | — | | — | | — | | 15 | 1 |
| Poços de Caldas | 2017 | Mineiro 2ª Divisão | — | | 14 | 1 | — | | — | | — | | 14 | 1 |
| Caldense | 2018 | Série D | 0 | 0 | 6 | 0 | 1 | 0 | — | | — | | 7 | 0 |
| Uberlândia | 2018 | Série D | 7 | 0 | — | | — | | — | | — | | 7 | 0 |
| Athletic-MG | 2018 | Mineiro 2ª Divisão | — | | 13 | 1 | — | | — | | — | | 13 | 1 |
| Patrocinense | 2019 | Série D | 8 | 0 | 9 | 0 | — | | — | | — | | 17 | 0 |
| Mamoré | 2019 | Mineiro 2ª Divisão | — | | 7 | 1 | — | | — | | — | | 7 | 1 |
| URT | 2020 | Mineiro | — | | 2 | 0 | — | | — | | — | | 2 | 0 |
| Athletic-MG | 2020 | Mineiro Módulo II | — | | 13 | 0 | — | | — | | — | | 13 | 0 |
| União Luziense | 2020 | Mineiro 2ª Divisão | — | | 6 | 2 | — | | — | | — | | 6 | 2 |
| Pouso Alegre | 2021 | Mineiro | — | | 13 | 1 | — | | — | | — | | 13 | 1 |
| Criciúma | 2021 | Série C | 18 | 1 | — | | 3 | 0 | — | | 2 (Note: Appearance(s) in Copa Santa Catarina) | 0 | 23 | 1 |
| Criciúma | 2022 | Série B | 33 | 0 | 5 | 1 | 2 | 0 | — | | — | | 40 | 1 |
| Criciúma | 2023 | Série B | 33 | 5 | 14 | 0 | 2 | 0 | — | | — | | 49 | 5 |
| Criciúma | Total | | 84 | 6 | 19 | 1 | 7 | 0 | — | | 2 | 0 | 112 | 7 |
| Coritiba | 2024 | Série B | 0 | 0 | 0 | 0 | 0 | 0 | — | | — | | 0 | 0 |
| Career total | | | 99 | 6 | 162 | 10 | 8 | 0 | 0 | 0 | 2 | 0 | 271 | 16 |

== Honours ==
Criciúma

- Campeonato Catarinense Série B: 2022
- Campeonato Catarinense: 2023
