= Evandro Teixeira =

Brazilian footballer (born 1986)

Personal information
- Full name: Evandro Teixeira Magalhães
- Date of birth: 1 December 1986 (age 39)
- Place of birth: Juiz de Fora, Brazil
- Height: 1.79 m (5 ft 10 in)
- Position: Defensive midfielder

Team information
- Current team: Novo Horizonte

Youth career
- 2006: Cruzeiro

Senior career*
Years	Team	Apps	(Gls)
2007–2008	→ América-MG (Loan)		
2009–2010	→ Ipatinga (Loan)	26	(1)
2011	Comercial-SP	3	(0)
2011	Tupi	0	(0)
2012	Cuiabá	13	(0)
2013	Araxá	9	(0)
2013	Nacional-AM	6	(1)
2013	São Caetano	2	(0)
2014	Fortaleza	11	(0)
2014	Madureira	5	(0)
2014	Uberaba		
2015	Nacional-AM	0	(0)
2015	Parauapebas (Note: Appearances not referenced on linked sources, but are referenced at:)	9	(0)
2016	Macaé	5	(0)
2016	Treze	1	(0)
2017	Guarani-MG	6	(0)
2017	Novo Horizonte (Note: Appearances not referenced on linked sources, but are referenced at:)	2	(0)
- * Club domestic league appearances and goals as of 10:15, 23 June 2017 (UTC)

Evandro Teixeira Magalhães (born 1 December 1986), sometimes known Mononymously as Evandro, is a Brazilian footballer who plays as a defensive midfielder, currently for Novo Horizonte.

== Career ==
Evandro Teixeira played 25 times for Ipatinga in 2009 and 2010 Campeonato Brasileiro Série B whilst on loan from Cruzeiro. He scored the only goal of this spell in a 2–1 win over ABC on 3 October 2009.

In January 2011, he played for Comercial in Campeonato Paulista Série A2 before joining Tupi, where he didn't enter the field of play in the one game he was selected to play.

On 21 May 2012, he signed for Cuiabá to play in 2012 Campeonato Brasileiro Série C He played 13 of the club's 18 games.

In early 2013, he represented newly promoted Araxá in 2013 Campeonato Mineiro, playing 9 of 11 games. Rather than representing the club in 2013 Campeonato Brasileiro Série D with the club, he joined Nacional and played six times in the competition, scoring in the 5–2 win over Genus on 11 August 2013. He also represented the team in 2013 Copa do Brasil three times. With Nacional eliminated from Série D, he joined São Caetano for the remainder of the 2013 Campeonato Brasileiro Série B season. He played in 2 games for the club.

On 17 December 2013, he signed for Fortaleza and played 11 games in 2014 Campeonato Cearense. In late 2014, he played 5 times for Madureira in 2014 Campeonato Brasileiro Série C, but on 2 September he signed for Uberaba in 2014 Campeonato Mineiro Módulo II.

On 15 December 2014, Evandro Teixeira was announced as part of the 2015 squad of Nacional, a return to the team he had represented two years earlier. however, he never featured for the club. By 8 February he was playing for Parauapebas in 2015 Campeonato Paraense, making a total of nine appearances.

2016 saw Evandro Teixeira join Macaé to play in 2016 Campeonato Carioca. He played a total of five times, and when the first phase of the competition finished he joined Treze to play in the latter stages of 2016 Campeonato Paraibano. His only appearance was in the second leg of the semi-final.

Evandro Teixeira joined Guarani-MG in the close season, to play in 2017 Campeonato Mineiro Módulo II. He made 6 appearances. In May 2017, he joined up with Novo Horizonte to play 2017 Campeonato Goiano Second Division.
