= Michael Paulista =

Brazilian footballer

Personal information
- Full name: Michael da Silva Alves
- Date of birth: 11 May 1994 (age 32)
- Place of birth: São Paulo, Brazil
- Height: 1.75 m (5 ft 9 in)
- Positions: Attacking midfielder; forward

Team information
- Current team: Pouso Alegre
- Number: 20

Senior career*
Years	Team	Apps	(Gls)
2014	Junior Team		
2014	Portuguesa Londrinense		(4)
2015	Nacional-PR	8	(2)
2016	América-TO	20	(12)
2016	URT	8	(4)
2016	Patrocinense	12	(5)
2017	Formosa	11	(0)
2017	Patrocinense	7	(0)
2018	Nacional de Muriaé	8	(7)
2018	Corumbaense	5	(2)
2018	Ponte Nova	12	(4)
2019	CRAC	12	(1)
2019	Valadares	8	(5)
2020	Athletic-MG	16	(8)
2020	→ Formosa (loan)	4	(0)
2021	Atibaia	16	(2)
2021	→ Volta Redonda (loan)	15	(1)
2022	Athletic-MG	10	(1)
2022–2023	Pouso Alegre	22	(1)
2023	Uberlândia	20	(5)
2023	ABECAT	13	(8)
2024	Manauara	11	(3)
2024	North	13	(2)
2025	Uberlândia	8	(2)
2025–2026	São José-SP	25	(7)
2025	→ Inter de Limeira (loan)	12	(1)
2026–	Pouso Alegre	1	(0)
- * Club domestic league appearances and goals as of 19:30, 22 April 2026 (UTC)

Michael da Silva Alves (born 11 May 1994), known as Michael Paulista, is a Brazilian footballer who plays as either an attacking midfielder or a forward for Pouso Alegre.

== Career ==
Born in São Paulo, Michael Paulista began his career in the Paraná state, playing for Junior Team, Portuguesa Londrinense and Nacional-PR in his first two senior seasons. He later established himself in the state of Minas Gerais, playing for América de Teófilo Otoni, URT, Patrocinense (two stints), Nacional de Muriaé, Valadares, Athletic-MG (two stints); he also had two short spells at Formosa and played in the 2018 Série D for Corumbaense.

On 16 December 2020, after being the top scorer of the Campeonato Mineiro Módulo II with Athletic, Michael Paulista was announced at Atibaia. He moved to Série C side Volta Redonda on loan the following 25 May, before returning to Athletic on 23 November 2021.

In April 2022, Michael Paulista became a part of Pouso Alegre's squad for the year's fourth division. He helped the club to achieve a first-ever promotion to the third tier, before signing for Uberlândia on 12 April 2023.

Michael Paulista finished the 2023 season at ABECAT, and was presented in the squad of Manauara in January 2024. He returned to Minas Gerais in May, joining North, and later rejoined Uberlândia on 14 November.

Michael Paulista left Uberlândia on 14 February 2025, and agreed to a deal with São José-SP the following day. On 5 April, he was announced on loan at Inter de Limeira, also helping the side to a promotion to the third division.

== Career statistics ==
As of 22 April 2026

Club	Season	League			State League		Cup		Continental		Other		Total	
Club	Season	Division	Apps	Goals	Apps	Goals	Apps	Goals	Apps	Goals	Apps	Goals	Apps	Goals
Nacional-PR	2015	Paranaense	—		8	2	—		—		—		8	2
América-TO	2016	Mineiro Módulo II	—		20	12	—		—		—		20	12
URT	2016	Série D	8	4	—		—		—		—		8	4
Patrocinense	2016	Mineiro Segunda Divisão	—		12	5	—		—		—		12	5
Formosa	2017	Brasiliense	—		11	0	—		—		—		11	0
Patrocinense	2017	Mineiro Módulo II	—		7	0	—		—		—		7	0
Nacional de Muriaé	2018	Mineiro Módulo II	—		12	4	—		—		—		12	4
Corumbaense	2018	Série D	5	2	—		—		—		—		5	2
Ponte Nova	2018	Mineiro Segunda Divisão	—		12	4	—		—		—		12	4
CRAC	2019	Goiano	—		12	1	—		—		—		12	1
Valadares	2019	Mineiro Segunda Divisão	—		8	5	—		—		—		8	5
Athletic-MG	2020	Mineiro Módulo II	—		16	8	—		—		—		16	8
Formosa (loan)	2020	Brasiliense	—		4	0	—		—		—		4	0
Atibaia	2021	Paulista A2	—		16	2	—		—		—		16	2
Volta Redonda (loan)	2021	Série C	15	1	—		—		—		2 (Note: Appearance(s) in Copa Rio)	0	17	1
Athletic-MG	2022	Mineiro	—		10	1	—		—		—		10	1
Pouso Alegre	2022	Série D	12	0	—		—		—		—		12	0
Pouso Alegre	2023	Série C	—		10	1	—		—		—		10	1
Pouso Alegre	Total		12	0	10	1	—		—		—		22	1
Uberlândia	2023	Mineiro Módulo II	—		20	5	—		—		—		20	5
ABECAT	2023	Goiano 3ª Divisão	—		13	8	—		—		—		13	8
Manauara	2024	Série D	—		11	3	1	0	—		1 (Note: Appearance(s) in Copa Verde)	0	13	3
North	2024	Mineiro Módulo II	—		13	2	—		—		—		13	2
Uberlândia	2025	Série D	—		8	2	—		—		—		8	2
São José-SP	2025	Paulista A2	—		6	1	—		—		—		6	1
São José-SP	2026	Paulista A2	—		19	6	—		—		—		19	6
São José-SP	Total		—		25	7	—		—		—		25	7
Inter de Limeira (loan)	2025	Série D	12	1	—		—		—		11 (Note: Appearance(s) in Copa Paulista)	2	23	3
Pouso Alegre	2026	Série D	1	0	—		—		—		—		1	0
Career total			53	8	249	71	1	0	0	0	26	4	329	83

== Honours ==
Patrocinense

- Campeonato Mineiro Módulo II: 2017

ABECAT

- Campeonato Goiano Terceira Divisão: 2023

Individual

- Campeonato Mineiro Módulo II top scorer: 2016, 2020
- Campeonato Goiano Terceira Divisão top scorer: 2023
