= Guilherme Zuconelli =

Brazilian footballer

Personal information
- Full name: Guilherme Santos Zuconelli
- Date of birth: 20 May 2000 (age 26)
- Place of birth: Coronel Vivida, Brazil
- Height: 1.91 m (6 ft 3 in)
- Position: Goalkeeper

Youth career
- 2017: Verê
- 2019–2020: Maringá
- 2019–2020: → Cruzeiro (loan)

Senior career*
Years	Team	Apps	(Gls)
2018	Rolândia	7	(0)
2019–2020	Maringá	3	(0)
2021	Capivariano	0	(0)
2021	Ipatinga	0	(0)
2021	Araxá	0	(0)
2022	Nacional Muriaé	0	(0)
2022	Ipatinga	1	(0)
2022	→ Novo Esporte (loan)	2	(0)
2023	Cianorte	0	(0)
2023	Apucarana Sports	1	(0)
2023	Atlético Três Corações	3	(0)
2024–2025	Monte Azul	7	(0)
2024	→ Maringá (loan)	0	(0)
2025	→ Cianorte (loan)	0	(0)
2026	São Bento	5	(0)
2026	Mamoré	11	(0)
2026	São José-SP	0	(0)
- * Club domestic league appearances and goals as of 15:21, 10 September 2026 (UTC)

Guilherme Santos Zuconelli (born 20 May 2000) is a Brazilian footballer who plays as a goalkeeper.

== Career ==
Born in Coronel Vivida, Paraná, Zuconelli played for the under-17 team of Verê in 2017, before making his senior debut with Rolândia in the following year. He joined Maringá in 2019, being initially a member of the under-19 squad before moving to Cruzeiro in August of that year.

Back to Maringá in September 2020, Zuconelli played just three matches before leaving for Capivariano for the upcoming season. He failed to make an appearance for the entire 2021 season, despite also being in the squads of Ipatinga and Araxá.

A backup option for Nacional Muriaé in the 2022 Campeonato Mineiro Módulo II, Zuconelli returned to Ipatinga in June of that year, but was again second-choice. In August, he was loaned to Novo Esporte, but also featured rarely.

Zuconelli represented Cianorte, Apucarana Sports and Atlético Três Corações during the 2023 campaign, before impressing with Monte Azul in the 2024 Campeonato Paulista Série A2. In April of that year, he returned to Maringá on loan, but left in October after making no appearances.

Back to AMA, Zuconelli was again a backup before returning to Cianorte on loan in April 2025. On 28 November, he was announced at São Bento for the upcoming season, and was also sparingly used before joining Mamoré on 8 April 2026.

On 28 August 2026, Zuconelli moved to São José-SP for the Copa Paulista.

== Career statistics ==
As of 10 September 2026

Club	Season	League			State League		Cup		Continental		Other		Total	
Club	Season	Division	Apps	Goals	Apps	Goals	Apps	Goals	Apps	Goals	Apps	Goals	Apps	Goals
Rolândia	2018	Paranaense 2ª Divisão	—		7	0	—		—		—		7	0
Maringá	2019	Série D	—		0	0	—		—		—		0	0
Maringá	2020	Paranaense 2ª Divisão	—		3	0	—		—		—		3	0
Maringá	Total		—		3	0	—		—		—		3	0
Capivariano	2021	Paulista A3	—		0	0	—		—		—		0	0
Ipatinga	2021	Mineiro Módulo II	—		0	0	—		—		—		0	0
Araxá	2021	Mineiro 2ª Divisão	—		0	0	—		—		—		0	0
Nacional Muriaé	2022	Mineiro Módulo II	—		0	0	—		—		—		0	0
Ipatinga	2022	Mineiro Módulo II	—		1	0	—		—		—		1	0
Novo Esporte (loan)	2022	Mineiro 2ª Divisão	—		2	0	—		—		—		2	0
Cianorte	2023	Paranaense	—		0	0	—		—		—		0	0
Apucarana Sports	2023	Paranaense 2ª Divisão	—		1	0	—		—		—		1	0
Atlético Três Corações	2023	Mineiro 2ª Divisão	—		3	0	—		—		—		3	0
Mixto	2024	Paulista A2	—		4	0	—		—		—		4	0
Mixto	2025	Paulista A3	—		3	0	—		—		—		3	0
Mixto	Total		—		7	0	—		—		—		7	0
Maringá (loan)	2024	Série D	0	0	—		—		—		—		0	0
Cianorte (loan)	2025	Série D	0	0	—		—		—		3 (Note: Appearance(s) in Taça FPF)	0	3	0
São Bento	2026	Paulista A2	—		5	0	—		—		—		5	0
Mamoré	2026	Mineiro Módulo II	—		11	0	—		—		—		11	0
São José-SP	2026	Paulista A2	—		—		—		—		0	0	0	0
Career total			0	0	40	0	0	0	0	0	3	0	43	0

== Honours ==
São José-SP

- Copa Paulista: 2026
