= Paulo Roberto Santos =

Brazilian football manager and former player

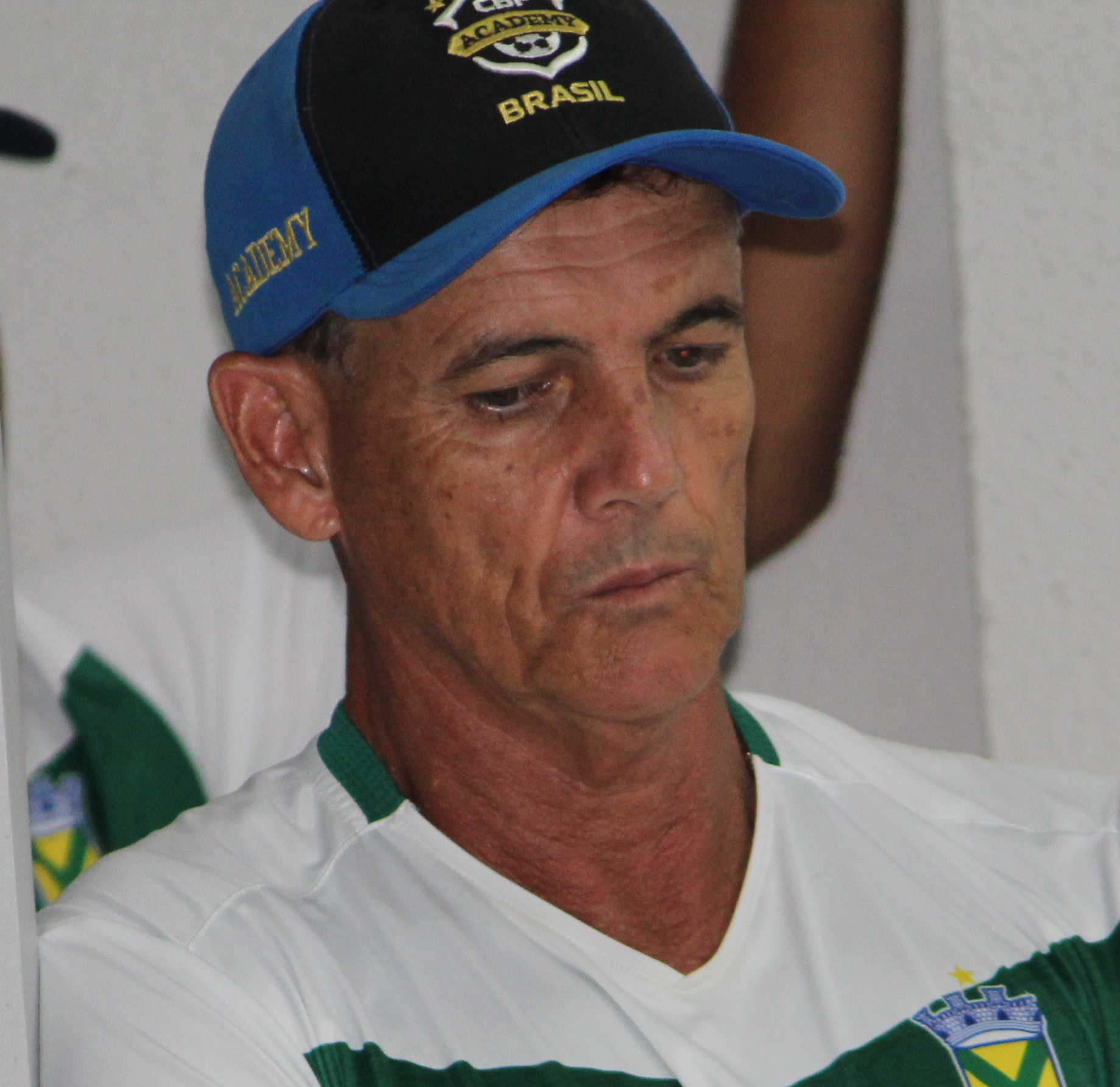
- Paulo Roberto as manager of Santo André in 2020

Personal information
- Full name: Paulo Roberto dos Santos
- Date of birth: 23 October 1958 (age 68)
- Place of birth: Rio de Janeiro, Brazil
- Height: 1.85 m (6 ft 1 in)
- Position: Left back

Team information
- Current team: Manaus (head coach)

Youth career
- Botafogo

Senior career*
Years	Team	Apps	(Gls)
- Botafogo
- America-RJ
- Bonsucesso
- Moto Club
- Sampaio Corrêa
- Galícia
- Criciúma
- Sergipe
- Confiança
- Itabuna
- Flamengo-MG

Managerial career
- 1988: Pouso Alegre
- 1988: America-RJ U20
- 1989: Minas
- 1990–1991: Mariense
- 1992: Rio Claro
- 1993: Unaí
- 1993: Alfenense
- 1994: Patrocinense
- 1994: Guaxupé
- 1994: Gama
- 1997: Uberaba
- 1997: Pouso Alegre
- 1997–1998: Al-Watani
- 1998: Guaxupé
- 1998: Gama
- 1999: Anapolina
- 2000–2001: Rio Claro
- 2002–2003: Rio Claro
- 2003: União São João
- 2003: Capivariano
- 2003: Fabril
- 2003–2004: Batatais
- 2004: Araxá
- 2004: Paranoá
- 2004–2006: Rio Claro
- 2006: Grêmio Barueri
- 2006–2007: Rio Claro
- 2007: Botafogo-SP
- 2007: Paysandu
- 2007–2009: Atlético Sorocaba
- 2009: Rio Branco-SP
- 2009: Atlético Sorocaba
- 2009: Noroeste
- 2009–2010: Ituiutaba
- 2010: União Barbarense
- 2010–2011: Atlético Sorocaba
- 2012: Arapongas
- 2013: Rio Claro
- 2013: Santo André
- 2014: São Bento
- 2014: São Caetano
- 2015: São Bento
- 2015: Guarani
- 2016–2018: São Bento
- 2018: Sampaio Corrêa
- 2019: Brasil de Pelotas
- 2020: Santo André
- 2020: Ferroviária
- 2021: Santo André
- 2021–2022: São Bento
- 2022: Pouso Alegre
- 2023: São Bento
- 2023: ASA
- 2023–2024: XV de Piracicaba
- 2024: Brasiliense
- 2025: Uberlândia
- 2025: São José-SP
- 2026: Votuporanguense
- 2026–: Manaus
- * Club domestic league appearances and goals

Paulo Roberto dos Santos (born 23 October 1958), known as Paulo Roberto Santos or Paulo Roberto, is a Brazilian football coach and former player who played as a left back. He is the current head coach of Manaus.

== Career ==
Paulo Roberto was born in Rio de Janeiro, and played as a left back. A Botafogo youth graduate, he spent the vast majority of his career with lower league clubs.

Paulo Roberto began his managerial career in 1988, with Pouso Alegre FC. He only came into prominence in the early 2000s, after being in charge of Rio Claro while the club achieved successive promotions in the lower levels of the Campeonato Paulista.

Paulo Roberto managed Série C sides Grêmio Barueri in 2006 and Paysandu in 2007, achieving promotion with the former. He was subsequently in charge of Atlético Sorocaba, winning the club's major title (Copa Paulista) in 2008.

On 30 July 2013, Paulo Roberto was appointed manager of Santo André. On 1 November, he was named São Bento manager, and took the club to the third place of the ensuing Campeonato Paulista Série A2, achieving promotion to the first division.

Paulo Roberto was appointed at the helm of São Caetano on 3 June 2014, but returned to São Bento in November.

On 2 June 2015, Paulo Roberto was appointed Guarani manager. Dismissed on 23 August, he rejoined São Bento on 17 September, achieving two consecutive promotions (2016 Série D and 2017 Série C).

== Managerial statistics ==
As of 7 March 2026

Managerial record by team and tenure
Team	Nat	From	To	Record							
Team	Nat	From	To	G	W	D	L	GF	GA	GD	Win %
Rio Claro	(Brazil)	1 January 2000	30 March 2003	66	29	15	22	97	78	+19	43.94
Career total				66	29	15	22	97	78	+19	43.94

== Honours ==
=== Manager ===
Gama

- Campeonato Brasiliense: 1994, 1998

Rio Claro

- Campeonato Paulista Série B1: 2002

Atlético Sorocaba

- Copa Paulista: 2008
