= Hugo Sanches =

Brazilian footballer

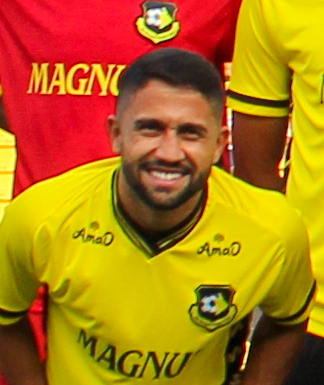
- Hugo Sanches in 2022

Personal information
- Full name: Hugo Sanches Nogueira Ribeiro Magalhães
- Date of birth: 9 July 1994 (age 32)
- Place of birth: Ubá, Brazil
- Height: 1.67 m (5 ft 6 in)
- Position: Right-back

Team information
- Current team: São Bernardo
- Number: 21

Youth career
- 2008–2014: Cruzeiro

Senior career*
Years	Team	Apps	(Gls)
2014–2015	Cruzeiro	0	(0)
2014	→ BEC-Tero Sasana (loan)		
2015	→ Tupi (loan)	4	(0)
2015	→ Formiga (loan)	9	(0)
2016	Formiga	10	(4)
2017	Serrano-PB	8	(3)
2017	Portuguesa-RJ	0	(0)
2018	São Luiz	11	(1)
2018–2020	Pelotas	28	(5)
2018	→ Juventude (loan)	12	(4)
2019	→ CRB (loan)	15	(1)
2020–2021	Vila Nova	6	(0)
2021	Paraná	2	(0)
2022	Audax Rio	11	(3)
2022–	São Bernardo	124	(7)
- * Club domestic league appearances and goals as of 18 November 2026

Hugo Sanches Nogueira Ribeiro Magalhães (born 9 July 1994), known as Hugo Sanches, is a Brazilian footballer who plays for São Bernardo. Mainly a right-back, he can also play as a right winger.

== Career ==
Hugo Sanches was born in Ubá, Minas Gerais, and was named after Mexican striker Hugo Sánchez. He represented Cruzeiro as a youth, but was loaned to Thai club BEC-Tero Sasana in September 2014.

On 17 December 2014, Hugo Sanches was loaned to Tupi. He later moved to Formiga also in a temporary deal, before joining the club permanently.

In October 2016, Hugo Sanches agreed to a deal with Nacional de Muriaé, but later moved to a Mexican club before joining Serrano-PB on 17 January 2017. He finished the year at Portuguesa-RJ, before moving to São Luiz ahead of the 2018 season.

On 30 August 2018, after a short stint at Pelotas, Hugo Sanches agreed to a loan deal with Juventude. On 14 December of that year, he was announced at CRB.

On 1 December 2020, Hugo Sanches joined Vila Nova. The following 25 February, he was announced at Paraná, but featured rarely.

In December 2021, Hugo Sanches agreed to a contract with Audax Rio. On 13 April of the following year, he joined São Bernardo.

== Career statistics ==
As of 3 February 2025

Club	Season	League			State League		Cup		Continental		Other		Total	
Club	Season	Division	Apps	Goals	Apps	Goals	Apps	Goals	Apps	Goals	Apps	Goals	Apps	Goals
Tupi	2015	Série C	0	0	4	0	1	0	—		—		5	0
Formiga	2015	Mineiro 2ª Divisão	—		9	0	—		—		—		9	0
Formiga	2016	Mineiro Módulo II	—		10	4	—		—		—		10	4
Formiga	Total		—		19	4	—		—		—		19	4
Serrano-PB	2017	Paraibano	—		8	3	—		—		—		8	3
Portuguesa-RJ	2017	Série D	0	0	—		—		—		2 (Note: Appearance(s) in Copa Rio)	0	2	0
São Luiz	2018	Gaúcho	—		11	1	—		—		—		11	1
Pelotas	2018	Gaúcho Série A2	—		14	4	—		—		2 (Note: Appearance(s) in Copa FGF)	0	16	4
Pelotas	2020	Série D	4	0	10	1	—		—		1 (Note: Appearance(s) in Recopa Gaúcha)	0	15	1
Pelotas	Total		4	0	24	5	—		—		3	0	31	5
Juventude (loan)	2018	Série B	12	4	—		—		—		—		12	4
CRB (loan)	2019	Série B	8	0	7	1	2	0	—		7 (Note: Appearance(s) in Copa do Nordeste)	0	24	1
Vila Nova	2020	Série C	5	0	1	0	—		—		—		6	0
Paraná	2021	Série C	0	0	2	0	1	0	—		—		3	0
Audax Rio	2022	Carioca	—		11	3	—		—		—		11	3
São Bernardo	2022	Série D	21	2	—		—		—		—		21	2
São Bernardo	2023	Série C	17	1	5	0	1	0	—		—		23	1
São Bernardo	2024	Série C	23	0	11	0	1	0	—		—		35	0
São Bernardo	2025	Série C	0	0	3	0	—		—		—		3	0
São Bernardo	Total		61	3	19	0	2	0	—		—		82	3
Career total			90	7	106	17	6	0	0	0	12	0	225	24

== Honours ==
Pelotas

- Campeonato Gaúcho Série A2: 2018
- Recopa Gaúcha: 2020

Vila Nova

- Campeonato Brasileiro Série C: 2020
