= 2011 Campeonato Mineiro =

Campeonato Mineiro
- Season: 2011
- Biggest home win: Guarani-MG 5-0 Ipatinga FC (January 30)
- Biggest away win: Funorte 0-3 Villa Nova (February 3); Uberaba 3-5 América de Teófilo Otoni (February 3)
- Highest scoring: Uberaba 3-5 América de Teófilo Otoni (February 3)
- Longest winning run: 5 games: América de Teófilo Otoni (March 12-April 10); América Mineiro (January 30-February 12); Cruzeiro (March 13-
- Longest unbeaten run: 8 games: Cruzeiro (February 19- )
- Longest losing run: 4 games: Guarani-MG (March 12 -April 03)

The 2011 Campeonato da Primera Divisåo de Profissionais - Módulo I , better known as the 2011 Campeonato Mineiro, was the 97th season of Minas Gerais's top-flight football league. The season began on January 29 and ended on May 15.

== Format ==
The first stage was a single round robin. The best four teams qualified for the playoffs. If two teams have the same number of goals the team with the better first stage performance advanced. The bottom two teams were relegated.

=== Qualifications ===
The best two teams not qualified to 2012 Copa Libertadores qualified for 2012 Copa do Brasil. The best two team not playing in Campeonato Brasileiro Série A (América Mineiro, Atlético Mineiro, Cruzeiro), B or C (Ipatinga FC) qualified for 2011 Campeonato Brasileiro Série D.

=== Teams ===
Locations of the 2011 Módulo I teams

Clubs	Home City	2010 result
América Mineiro	Belo Horizonte	6th
América-TO	Teófilo Otoni	10th
Atlético Mineiro	Belo Horizonte	1st
Caldense	Poços de Caldas	9th
Cruzeiro	Belo Horizonte	3rd
EC Democrata	Governador Valadares	4th
Funorte	Montes Claros	2nd (Modul II)
Guarani	Divinópolis	1st (Modul II)
Ipatinga FC	Ipatinga	2nd
Tupi	Juiz de Fora	5th
Uberaba SC	Uberaba	8th
Villa Nova	Nova Lima	7th

== First stage ==
Pos	Team	Pld	W	D	L	GF	GA	GD	Pts	Qualification or relegation
1	Cruzeiro (A)	11	9	1	1	29	8	+21	28	Advances to the Semifinals
2	Atlético Mineiro (A)	11	8	2	1	32	15	+17	26	Advances to the Semifinals
3	América Mineiro (A)	11	7	2	2	25	17	+8	23	Advances to the Semifinals
4	América de Teófilo Otoni (A)	11	6	3	2	23	18	+5	21	Advances to the Semifinals (Note: America-TO withdrew from Série D)
5	Villa Nova	11	4	4	3	17	14	+3	16	Série D
6	Tupi	11	4	3	4	15	15	0	15	Série D
7	Caldense	11	3	4	4	9	13	−4	13	
8	Guarani-MG	11	3	1	7	18	22	−4	10	
9	Uberaba	11	2	4	5	14	22	−8	10	
10	Democrata	11	1	4	6	17	28	−11	7	
11	Ipatinga FC (R)	11	1	4	6	10	21	−11	7	Relegation to Modul II
12	Funorte (R)	11	1	2	8	10	26	−16	5	Relegation to Modul II

Updated to match(es) played on 17th April. Source: fmf (in Portuguese)
Rules for classification: 1st points; 2nd wins; 3rd goal difference; 4th goals scored; 5th head-to-head points (only when two teams are tie) 5th red cards received; 6th yellow cards received; 7th public draw
(A) Advance to a further round; (R) Relegated

=== Results ===
Home \ Away	AMG	ATO	CAM	CAL	CRU	DEM	FUN	GUA	IPA	TUP	VIN	UBE
América Mineiro		1–3			2–3	4–3	2–1		4–1			1–1
América de Teófilo Otoni				1–1	1–2		5–1	2–1			2–1	
Atlético Mineiro	1–2	7–1								4–1	2–1	1–1
Caldense	0–2		0–4					1–0	2–0			1–1
Cruzeiro			3–4	3–0		7–0	3–0	4–1	2–0			
Democrata		0–0	1–3	1–1				0–2			2–3	2–2
Funorte			1–2	1–1		2–5				1–0	0–3	
Guarani-MG	2–4		2–4				2–1		5–0	0–2		1–2
Ipatinga FC		0–2	2–2			0–0	1–1			0–1		4–0
Tupi	0–1	1–1		1–2	0–0	4–3					1–1	
Villa Nova	2–2			1–0	0–1			2–2	2–2			
Uberaba		3–5			0–1		2–1			2–4	0–1	

Legend: Blue = home team win; Yellow = draw; Red = away team win.

=== Playoffs ===
Semifinals
1	Cruzeiro	8	5	13
4	América de Teófilo Otoni	1	1	2
2	Atlético Mineiro	3	2	5
3	América Mineiro	1	1	2

Finals
Cruzeiro	1	2	3
Atlético Mineiro	2	0	2

== Overall table ==
Pos	Team	Pld	W	D	L	GF	GA	GD	Pts	Qualification or relegation
1	Cruzeiro (C)	15	12	1	2	35	12	+23	37	Finalists and 2012 Copa do Brasil
2	Atlético Mineiro	15	11	2	2	39	20	+19	35	Finalists and 2012 Copa do Brasil
3	América Mineiro	13	7	2	4	0	0	0	23	Eliminated in Semifinals
4	América de Teófilo Otoni	13	6	3	4	0	0	0	21	Eliminated in Semifinals (Note: America-TO withdrew from Série D)
5	Villa Nova	11	4	4	3	17	14	+3	16	Série D
6	Tupi	11	4	3	4	15	15	0	15	Série D
7	Caldense	11	3	4	4	9	13	−4	13	
8	Guarani-MG	11	3	1	7	18	22	−4	10	
9	Uberaba	11	2	4	5	14	22	−8	10	
10	Democrata	11	1	4	6	17	28	−11	7	
11	Ipatinga FC (R)	11	1	4	6	10	21	−11	7	Relegation to Módulo II
12	Funorte (R)	11	1	2	8	10	26	−16	5	Relegation to Módulo II

Updated to match(es) played on 17th April. Source: fmf (in Portuguese)
Rules for classification: 1st stage; 2nd points; 3rd wins; 4th goal difference; 5th goals scored; 6th head-to-head points (only when two teams are tie) 7th red cards received; 8th yellow cards received; 9th public draw
(C) Champions; (R) Relegated
