= 2013 Campeonato Mineiro =

Campeonato Mineiro
- Season: 2013
- Champions: Atlético Mineiro
- Relegated: América-TO; Araxá
- Série D: Tombense; Villa Nova
- Matches: 68
- Goals: 196 (2.88 per match)
- Top goalscorer: Junior Negão (8 goals)

The 2013 Campeonato da Primera Divisåo de Profissionais - Módulo I (official name: Campeonato Mineiro Chevrolet 2013), better known as 2013 Campeonato Mineiro, was the 99th season of Minas Gerais' top-flight football league. The season began on January 27 and ended on May 19. Atlético Mineiro were the champions for the 42nd time.

== Format ==
The format is the same from the previous season. The first stage is a single round robin. The top four teams will be qualified to the playoffs, and the bottom two teams will be relegated to the 2014 Módulo II.

== Teams ==
| Clubs | Home City | 2012 result |
|---|---|---|
| América Mineiro | Belo Horizonte | 2nd |
| América-TO | Teófilo Otoni | 9th |
| Araxá | Araxá | 1st (Módulo II) |
| Atlético Mineiro | Belo Horizonte | 1st |
| Boa Esporte | Varginha | 8th |
| Caldense | Poços de Caldas | 7th |
| Cruzeiro | Belo Horizonte | 4th |
| Guarani | Divinópolis | 6th |
| Nacional | Patos de Minas | 5th |
| Tombense | Tombos | 2nd (Módulo II) |
| Tupi | Juiz de Fora | 3rd |
| Villa Nova | Nova Lima | 10th |

== First stage ==
| Pos | Team | Pld | W | D | L | GF | GA | GD | Pts | Qualification or relegation |
|---|---|---|---|---|---|---|---|---|---|---|
| 1 | Cruzeiro | 11 | 10 | 1 | 0 | 31 | 9 | +22 | 31 | Advances to the Semifinals |
| 2 | Atlético Mineiro | 11 | 9 | 0 | 2 | 30 | 11 | +19 | 27 | Advances to the Semifinals |
| 3 | Tombense | 11 | 6 | 1 | 4 | 16 | 12 | +4 | 19 | Advances to the Semifinals |
| 4 | Villa Nova | 11 | 5 | 3 | 3 | 15 | 11 | +4 | 18 | Advances to the Semifinals |
| 5 | Tupi | 11 | 4 | 3 | 4 | 13 | 16 | −3 | 15 | |
| 6 | Caldense | 11 | 3 | 6 | 2 | 12 | 10 | +2 | 15 | |
| 7 | Guarani-MG | 11 | 4 | 2 | 5 | 16 | 19 | −3 | 14 | |
| 8 | América Mineiro | 11 | 3 | 3 | 5 | 14 | 18 | −4 | 12 | |
| 9 | Nacional-MG | 11 | 3 | 2 | 6 | 13 | 18 | −5 | 11 | |
| 10 | Boa Esporte | 11 | 3 | 2 | 6 | 12 | 19 | −7 | 11 | |
| 11 | América de Teófilo Otoni | 11 | 2 | 1 | 8 | 8 | 24 | −16 | 7 | Relegation to Modul II |
| 12 | Araxá | 11 | 2 | 0 | 9 | 10 | 23 | −13 | 6 | Relegation to Modul II |

Updated to match(es) played on April 21, 2013. Source:
Rules for classification: 1st points; 2nd wins; 3rd goal difference; 4th goals scored; 5th head-to-head points (only when two teams are tie) 5th red cards received; 6th yellow cards received; 7th public draw

=== Results ===
| Home \ Away | AMG | ATO | ARX | CAM | BOA | CAL | CRU | GUA | NAC | TBE | TUP | VIN |
|---|---|---|---|---|---|---|---|---|---|---|---|---|
| América Mineiro | | | | | 0–0 | 1–0 | 1–4 | 4–0 | 1–1 | 0–2 | | |
| América de Teófilo Otoni | 1–3 | | | 0–2 | | 1–1 | | | | 1–2 | | 2–1 |
| Araxá | 2–1 | 0–1 | | | | | 2–3 | 2–3 | | 0–3 | | 0–2 |
| Atlético Mineiro | 5–2 | | 3–0 | | 4–0 | | | 3–1 | | | 4–1 | 2–1 |
| Boa Esporte | | 3–0 | 1–0 | | | | 1–4 | | 2–1 | | 1–2 | |
| Caldense | | | 2–0 | 2–1 | 1–1 | | | 1–1 | | 0–0 | | |
| Cruzeiro | | 2–0 | | | | 2–1 | | | 5–0 | 3–1 | | |
| Guarani-MG | | 4–1 | | 2–1 | 2–1 | | 0–0 | | 1–0 | 3–4 | | 0–1 |
| Nacional-MG | | 4–0 | 2–1 | 1–3 | | 2–3 | | | | | 2–1 | 0–0 |
| Tombense | | | | 1–2 | 2–1 | | | | 1–0 | | 0–1 | 0–1 |
| Tupi | 1–1 | 2–1 | 2–3 | | | 0–0 | 0–2 | 2–1 | | | | |
| Villa Nova | 2–0 | | | | 3–1 | 1–1 | 2–4 | | | | 1–1 | |

Updated to match(es) played on 30 July 2013. Source:
Legend: Blue = home team win; Yellow = draw; Red = away team win.

== Playoffs ==
Semifinals
1 | Cruzeiro | 4 | 1 | 5
4 | Villa Nova | 0 | 0 | 0
2 | Atlético Mineiro | 2 | 5 | 7
3 | Tombense | 0 | 1 | 1

Finals
1 | Cruzeiro | 0 | 2 | 2
2 | Atlético Mineiro | 3 | 1 | 4

== Top goalscorers ==
As of 20 May 2013.

| Rank | Player | Club | Goals |
|---|---|---|---|
| 1 | (Brazil) Junior Negão | Tombense | 8 |
| 2 | (Brazil) Borges | Cruzeiro | 7 |
| 2 | (Brazil) Dagoberto | Cruzeiro | 7 |
| 3 | (Equatorial Guinea) Nena | Caldense | 6 |
| 4 | (Brazil) Fábio Júnior | América Mineiro | 5 |
| 4 | (Brazil) Jô | Atlético Mineiro | 5 |
| 4 | (Brazil) Réver | Atlético Mineiro | 5 |
| 4 | (Brazil) Tchô | Villa Nova | 5 |
