= Ricardo Drubscky =

Brazilian football manager

Personal information
- Full name: Sebastião Ricardo Drubscky de Campos
- Date of birth: 20 January 1962 (age 64)
- Place of birth: Belo Horizonte, Brazil

Team information
- Current team: Villa Nova

Managerial career
- Years: Team
- 1994: Atlético Mineiro (youth)
- 1995–1996: América Mineiro (youth)
- 1996: Universidad Católica del Ecuador
- 1996–1997: Mamoré
- 1997: América Mineiro
- 1997: Democrata-GV
- 1997–1999: Villa Nova
- 2001: Araçatuba
- 2002: Valeriodoce
- 2003: Ipatinga
- 2003: Botafogo-PB
- 2003: Caxias
- 2005–2008: Cruzeiro (youth)
- 2008: Ipatinga
- 2011: Monte Azul
- 2011: Tupi
- 2012: Volta Redonda
- 2012: Atlético Paranaense (assistant)
- 2012–2013: Atlético Paranaense
- 2013: Joinville
- 2014: Criciúma
- 2014: Paraná
- 2014: Goiás
- 2015: Vitória
- 2015: Fluminense
- 2015: Audax
- 2016: Tupi
- 2016: Anápolis
- 2018: América Mineiro
- 2019: Tombense
- 2021: Boston City Brasil
- 2022: Floresta
- 2023: Betim
- 2024: Sport Recife (technical coordinator)
- 2025–: Villa Nova

Sebastião Ricardo Drubscky de Campos (born 20 January 1962), known as Ricardo Drubscky, is a Brazilian football coach and executive. He is the current head coach of Villa Nova.

== Career ==
Born in Belo Horizonte, Minas Gerais, Drubscky began his career as a fitness coach of Cruzeiro's youth setup in 1986. The following year he held the same role at the first team, but left the club in 1988.

Drubscky's first senior team was Universidad Católica del Ecuador in 1996, after winning the year's Copa São Paulo de Futebol Júnior with América Mineiro. In 1997, after a spell with Mamoré, he returned to América as a first-team manager.

After managerial roles with Democrata-GV, Villa Nova, Ipiranga-MG, Araçatuba, Valeriodoce, Ipatinga, Botafogo-PB and Caxias, Drubscky was a director of football at Atlético Mineiro and América. On 7 May 2005, he was named manager of first club Cruzeiro's youth setup.

On 14 June 2008, Drubscky returned to Ipatinga, with the side now in the Série A. Sacked on 21 August, he was subsequently named Atlético Paranaense's youth coordinator.

Drubscky was named at the helm of Monte Azul on 20 October 2010. The following 31 May, he took over Tupi, and led the club to a Série D title.

On 20 November 2011, Drubscky was appointed manager of Volta Redonda for the 2012 campaign. The following 12 June, he returned to Atlético Paranaense, now as first-team manager.

Drubscky was demoted to assistant after the arrival of Jorginho, but returned to his previous role in August 2012 after the latter's dismissal. He achieved promotion to the first division, but was himself sacked on 8 July 2013.

Drubscky was subsequently in charge of Joinville, Criciúma, Paraná, Goiás and Vitória before being appointed at Fluminense on 24 March 2015. He was relieved from his duties at the latter on 20 May.

After managing Audax, Tupi and Anápolis, Drubscky returned to América on 20 October 2016, as a director of football. On 20 June 2018, he replaced departing Enderson Moreira as first-team manager.

== Honours ==
América Mineiro

- Copa São Paulo de Futebol Júnior: 1996

Botafogo-PB

- Campeonato Paraibano: 2002

Tupi

- Campeonato Brasileiro Série D: 2011

Atlético Paranaense

- Marbella Cup: 2013
