= Leston Júnior =

Brazilian football manager (born 1978)

Personal information
- Full name: Leston Izaias do Nascimento Júnior
- Date of birth: 20 October 1978 (age 48)
- Place of birth: Divinópolis, Brazil

Team information
- Current team: Floresta (head coach)

Managerial career
- Years: Team
- 1998–2001: Cruzeiro U20
- 2002–2004: Flamengo-MG U20
- 2005–2006: DEC U20
- 2006–2008: América Mineiro U20
- 2008–2009: Cruzeiro U20
- 2009: Bahia U20
- 2010–2012: Inter de Bebedouro
- 2012: Olímpia
- 2012–2014: Guarani de Divinópolis
- 2014: Madureira
- 2015: Tupi
- 2016: Remo
- 2016: Mogi Mirim
- 2017: Villa Nova
- 2017: Moto Club
- 2018: Botafogo-PB
- 2019: Santa Cruz
- 2020–2021: Floresta
- 2021–2022: Santa Cruz
- 2022: Floresta
- 2023: Campinense
- 2023–2024: Cascavel
- 2024: Santo André
- 2025: América de Natal
- 2025–: Floresta

Leston Izaias do Nascimento Júnior (born 20 October 1978), known as Leston Júnior, is a Brazilian football coach, currently the head coach of Floresta.

== Early life ==
Born in Divinópolis, son of former athlete Leston Isaias (50s and 60s), Leston Izaias do Nascimento Júnior, was created in the middle of football. Were four years at Soccer Schools and six years in high-performance base teams.

== Career ==
He began his career as a coach in 1999, in the categories of base of Cruzeiro. The front of the Children's Team, Leston was at the club from 1999 to 2001. In the youth level, past the clubs: Cruzeiro, Flamengo, Divinópolis EC, América Mineiro and Bahia.

11 years later, in 2010, she made her first job as a professional at Inter de Bebedouro. In 2012 Leston coached Olímpia, which was close to winning a place in Campeonato Paulista Série A2. In the same year, he was hired by the Guarani-MG, which prevented the fall of the Buggy to the second division of the State.

In 2014, he commanded Madureira, which led the team to the quarterfinals of the Campeonato Brasileiro Série C, being eliminated by the CRB. The following year he coached Tupi, where he led the club to the long-sought access to Campeonato Brasileiro Série B.

== Honours ==
Botafogo-PB

- Campeonato Paraibano: 2018
