= Matheus Santos (footballer) =

Brazilian footballer

Matheusinho
Personal information
- Full name: Matheus Santos Soares
- Date of birth: 29 July 1998 (age 28)
- Place of birth: São Bernardo do Campo, Brazil
- Height: 1.75 m (5 ft 9 in)
- Position: Attacking midfielder

Team information
- Current team: Confiança
- Number: 21

Youth career
- 2007–2012: Corinthians
- 2015–2016: Desportivo Brasil
- 2016–2019: América Mineiro

Senior career*
Years	Team	Apps	(Gls)
2017–2021	América Mineiro	1	(0)
2017	→ Guarani-MG (loan)	2	(0)
2019	→ Santo André (loan)	0	(0)
2020	→ Rio Claro (loan)	7	(1)
2020	→ Nacional de Muriaé (loan)	1	(0)
2021	Sertãozinho	10	(0)
2021	Patrocinense	11	(0)
2021	Veranópolis	11	(3)
2022	Ypiranga-RS	14	(1)
2022–2024	Goiás	8	(0)
2023–2024	→ Mirassol (loan)	3	(0)
2024	Amazonas	6	(1)
2024-2025	Chadormalou	14	(1)
2025-	Confiança	0	(0)
- * Club domestic league appearances and goals as of 22 August 2023

Matheus Santos Soares (born 29 July 1998), known as Matheus Santos or Matheusinho, is a Brazilian footballer who plays as an attacking midfielder for Confiança.

== Club career ==
Born in São Bernardo do Campo, São Paulo, Matheusinho was an América Mineiro youth graduate, but made his senior debut while on loan to Guarani-MG in 2017. Upon returning to his parent club, he featured mainly with the under-20s before making his first team debut on 11 March 2018, starting in a 1–1 Campeonato Mineiro away draw against Villa Nova.

On 16 March 2018, five days after his debut, Matheusinho renewed his contract with América until December 2020. However, he did not appear for the side again, serving loan deals at Santo André, Rio Claro and Nacional de Muriaé.

On 9 April 2021, Matheusinho signed for Sertãozinho. He subsequently represented Série D side Patrocinense before joining Veranópolis on 2 September.

On 14 December 2021, Matheusinho agreed to a deal with Ypiranga-RS in the Série C. After being a regular starter as the side reached the 2022 Campeonato Gaúcho Finals, he moved to Série A side Goiás on 12 April 2022.

Matheusinho made his debut for the Esmeraldino on 31 May 2022, coming on as a second-half substitute for Apodi in a 1–0 away win over Red Bull Bragantino, for the year's Copa do Brasil. His top tier debut occurred six days later, as he started in a 2–1 away win over Botafogo but had to leave after just nine minutes due to a serious knee injury.

== Career statistics ==
As of 11 June 2022

Club	Season	League			State League		Cup		Continental		Other		Total	
Club	Season	Division	Apps	Goals	Apps	Goals	Apps	Goals	Apps	Goals	Apps	Goals	Apps	Goals
Guarani-MG	2017	Mineiro Módulo II	—		2	0	—		—		—		2	0
América Mineiro	2018	Série A	0	0	1	0	0	0	—		—		1	0
Santo André	2019	Paulista A2	—		0	0	—		—		10 (Note: Appearance(s) in Copa Paulista)	1	10	1
Rio Claro	2020	Paulista A2	—		7	1	—		—		—		7	1
Nacional de Muriaé	2020	Mineiro Módulo II	—		1	0	—		—		—		1	0
Sertãozinho	2021	Paulista A2	—		10	0	—		—		—		10	0
Patrocinense	2021	Série D	11	0	—		—		—		—		11	0
Veranópolis	2021	Gaúcho A2	—		11	3	—		—		—		11	3
Ypiranga	2022	Série C	1	0	13	1	—		—		—		14	1
Goiás	2022	Série A	1	0	—		1	0	—		—		2	0
Career total			42	4	43	7	1	1	1	0	9	1	96	13
