= Matheus Santos =

Matheus Santos may refer to:

- Matheus Santos (footballer) (born 1998), Brazilian football midfielder
- Matheus Santos (volleyball) (born 1996), Brazilian volleyball player
- Matheus Santos Carneiro da Cunha, known as Matheus Cunha (born 1999), Brazilian football forward

== See also ==
- Mateus Santos (born 1999), Brazilian football winger
