= Betim Futebol =

Brazilian association football club based in Betim, Minas Gerais, Brazil

Betim
- Full name: Betim Futebol
- Nicknames: O Time da Cidade (The City's Team); Guerreiro (Warrior)
- Founded: 2019; 7 years ago
- Ground: Estádio Jurandir Elias
- Capacity: 2,000
- President: Wellington Lins
- Head coach: Ricardo Drubscky
- League: Campeonato Brasileiro Série D Campeonato Mineiro
- 2025: Mineiro, 7th of 12
- Website: betimfutebol.com.br
Home colors	Away colors

Betim Futebol is a Brazilian professional club based in Betim, Minas Gerais, founded in 2019. Since 2025, Betim competes in the Campeonato Mineiro, the top-flight football league in the state of Minas Gerais.

== History ==
The Associação Mineira de Desenvolvimento Humano (AMDH) was originally founded on 9 August 2008, as a non-profittable project focused on helping disadvantaged groups of kids to have opportunities to play football. The team later started playing on several youth competitions in the state of Minas Gerais.

In 2019, AMDH changed their name to Betim Futebol and decided to start a senior team. The club first appeared in a senior competition in the year's Campeonato Mineiro Segunda Divisão, losing the finals to Pouso Alegre but still achieving promotion to the Campeonato Mineiro Módulo II.

In 2020, Betim narrowly missed out a consecutive promotion, finishing third in the year's Módulo II. After a fifth place in 2021, the club again finished third in 2022, again missing out promotion.

In August 2024, Betim won the year's Módulo II after achieving a first-ever promotion to the Campeonato Mineiro.

== Coaching history ==
- (Brazil) Bruno Barros (2019–2020)
- (Brazil) Emerson Ávila (2020)
- (Brazil) Marcelo Albino (2021)
- (Brazil) Emerson Ávila (2021)
- (Brazil) Eugênio Souza (2022)
- (Brazil) Rogério Henrique (2022)
- (Brazil) Ricardo Drubscky (2023)
- (Brazil) Bruno Barros (2024)
- (Brazil) Alex Nascif (2024–)

== Honours ==
- Campeonato Mineiro Módulo II
  - Winners (1): 2024
