= Taça Minas Gerais =

Football tournament in Minas Gerais, Brazil

The Taça Minas Gerais is a traditional football tournament played in the Minas Gerais state in Brazil. From 1973 through 1977 and then in 1980 and 1981, was a separate competition. In 1979 and from 1982 to 1987, it was played as one of the phases in the Campeonato Mineiro, like the Taça Guanabara in the Campeonato Carioca. The tournament was not played again until 1999, but only teams from the interior of Minas Gerais participated and the winner earned itself a berth in the Copa do Brasil. Since 2004, any team from the Campeonato Mineiro's three divisions have been eligible. The winner also gets a berth in the Copa do Brasil as Minas Gerais are allowed five, the other four go to the top four finishers of the Campeonato Mineiro.

== List of champions ==
Year	Champion	Runner-up
1973	Cruzeiro	Atlético
1974	Not held	
1975	Atlético	Cruzeiro
1976	Atlético	Cruzeiro
1977	Villa Nova	América
1978	Not held	
1979	Atlético	Cruzeiro
1980	Uberaba	América
1981	Democrata (GV)	Uberlândia
1982	Cruzeiro	Atlético
1983	Cruzeiro	Atlético
1984	Cruzeiro	América
1985	Cruzeiro	Atlético
1986	Atlético	Cruzeiro
1987	Atlético	Cruzeiro
1988-1998	Not held	
1999	URT	Democrata (GV)
2000	URT	Ipatinga
2001-2002	Not held	
2003	Uberlândia	Araxá
2004	Ipatinga	Democrata (GV)
2005	América	Caldense
2006	Villa Nova	Uberaba
2007	Ituiutaba^{(1)}	Tupi
2008	Tupi	América
2009	Uberaba	Villa Nova
2010	Uberaba	Uberlândia
2011	Ipatinga	Boa Esporte
2012	Boa Esporte	Villa Nova

^{(1)} Since 2011 Ituiutaba is named Boa Esporte.

== Club titles ==
- 5 titles
  - Cruzeiro: 1973, 1982, 1983, 1984, 1985
  - Atlético: 1975, 1976, 1979, 1986, 1987
- 3 titles
  - Uberaba: 1980, 2009, 2010
- 2 titles
  - Boa Esporte: 2007, 2012
  - Ipatinga: 2004, 2011
  - URT: 1999, 2000
  - Villa Nova: 1977, 2006
- 1 title
  - Democrata (GV): 1981
  - América: 2005
  - Tupi: 2008
  - Uberlândia: 2003
