= Réver =

Brazilian footballer (born 1985)

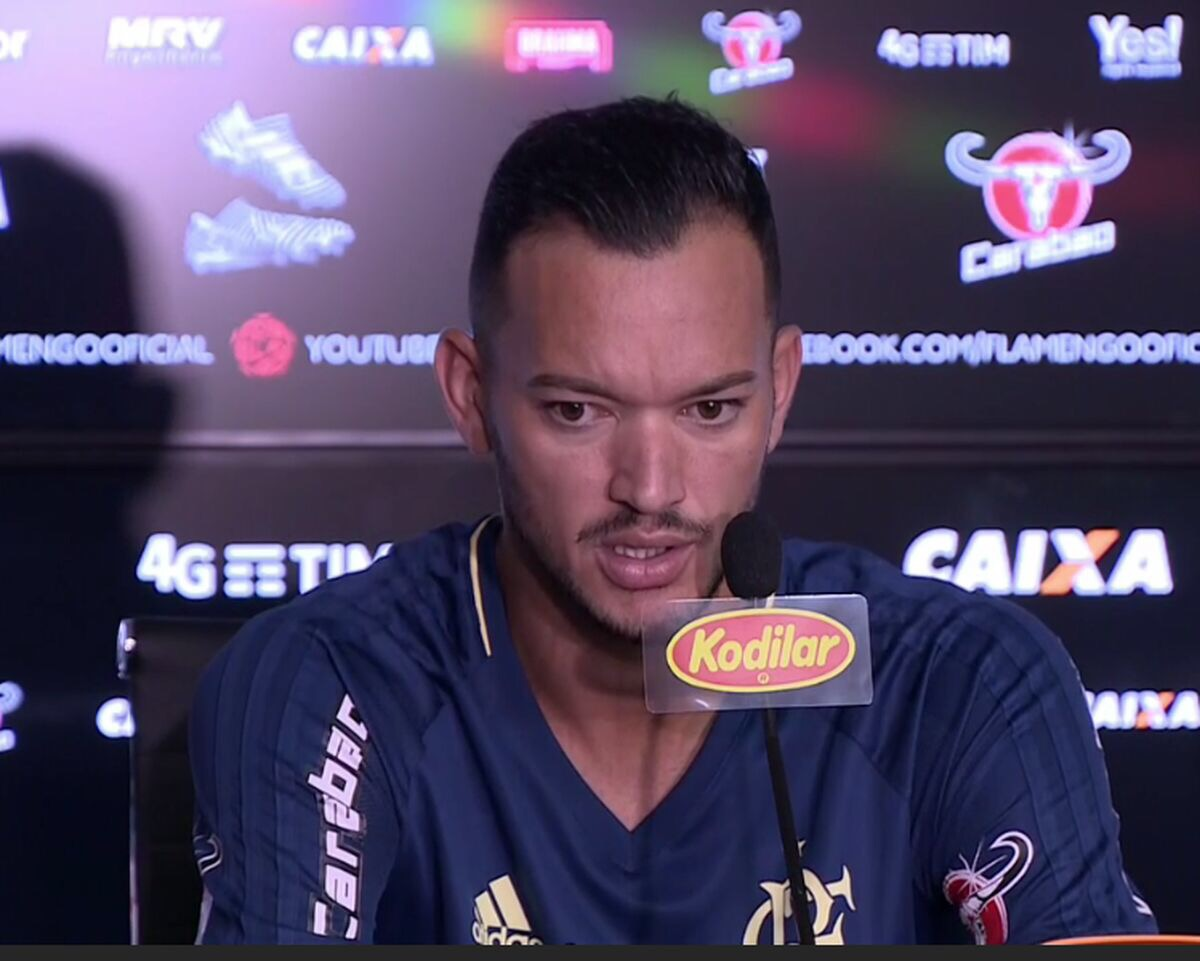
- Réver with Flamengo in 2017

Personal information
- Full name: Réver Humberto Alves de Araújo
- Date of birth: 4 January 1985 (age 41)
- Place of birth: Ariranha, Brazil
- Height: 1.92 m (6 ft 4 in)
- Position: Centre-back

Team information
- Current team: Red Bull Bragantino (assistant)

Youth career
- 2003–2004: Paulista

Senior career*
Years	Team	Apps	(Gls)
2004–2009	Paulista	77	(4)
2007–2008	→ Al-Wahda (loan)	10	(0)
2008	→ Grêmio (loan)	35	(2)
2009–2010	Grêmio	48	(5)
2010	VfL Wolfsburg	0	(0)
2010–2014	Atlético Mineiro	146	(19)
2015–2018	Internacional	30	(2)
2016–2018	→ Flamengo (loan)	99	(9)
2019–2023	Atlético Mineiro	134	(5)
Total		579	(46)

International career
2010–2013	Brazil	8	(1)

Managerial career
- 2024–2025: Goiás (assistant)
- 2025–: Red Bull Bragantino (assistant)
- * Club domestic league appearances and goals

Réver Humberto Alves de Araújo (born 4 January 1985), simply known as Réver, is a Brazilian professional football coach and former player. He is the current assistant coach of Red Bull Bragantino.

Mainly a centre-back, Réver could also play as a defensive midfielder. He has won the Bola de Prata and Prêmio Craque do Brasileirão twice each, and had his playing career mainly associated with Atlético Mineiro.

== Club career ==
=== Paulista ===
Born in Ariranha, São Paulo, Réver started his career at Paulista, a Série B football club based in Jundiaí, and was promoted to the first team in 2004. He was a part of the Paulista Championship runner-up squad and contributed to the major title of the club, the 2005 Brazilian Cup.

Réver soon became an important first teamer alongside Marcio Mossoró and Victor and attracted many other big Brazilian clubs. Despite the bad campaign in the Libertadores in 2006, he stood out and went on loan to Al-Wahda, a football club based in Abu Dhabi.

=== Grêmio ===
In early 2008, after the relegation to the Série C and the Campeonato Paulista poor campaign, Paulista sold half of Réver's rights and sent him on loan to Grêmio, reuniting with former teammate Victor. He quickly gained a first team spot and established himself as one of the bests defenders in the championship, being also one of the team's vice-captains.

On 12 November, Gremio obtained the other half of his rights and Réver signed a new five-year contract. He was an ever-present figure during the following campaigns.

=== Wolfsburg ===
In January 2010 Réver signed a five-year contract with VfL Wolfsburg. He only appeared in an UEFA Europa League match against Fulham, being on the bench during the Bundesliga season.

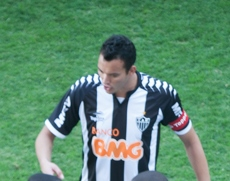
Réver playing for Atlético Mineiro in 2012

=== Atlético Mineiro ===
On 19 July 2010, Réver was announced as an Atlético Mineiro player for the 2010 Série A on club president Alexandre Kalil's personal Twitter account. Réver debuted for Atlético Mineiro a month later, being called up for the national time in the meantime, and became team captain in the second half of the season. The following season was difficult for the club in the Série A, struggling against relegation, but Réver won the Prêmio Craque do Brasileirão for best centre-back in the competition. In 2012, Réver captained the team in its undefeated Campeonato Minero victory, and through its Série A title contest with Fluminense. Despite the club finishing as runner-up, Réver again was selected for the team of the year, in both the Craque do Brasileirão and the Bola de Prata awards, together with teammate Leonardo Silva. Réver remained as club captain in the following season, in which he won the Campeonato Mineiro and the Copa Libertadores with the club. In 2014, he became Atlético Mineiro's top goalscoring centre-back in history with 22 goals, a record later surpassed by Leonardo Silva, who replaced Réver as captain in the middle of the season as he struggled with injury. After winning the 2014 Recopa Sudamericana with the club, another injury made Réver eventually lose his first-squad status to Jemerson in the later half of the season, and in 2015 he was allowed to leave by the club's board.

=== Internacional ===
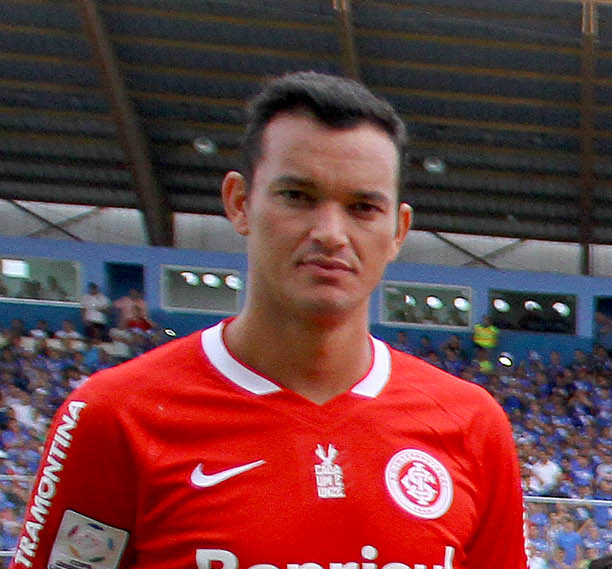
Réver with Internacional in 2015

On 14 January 2015 Réver joined Internacional on a 3-year and a half contract.

=== Flamengo ===
Réver playing for Flamengo in 2018

On 8 June 2016 Internacional accepted to loan Réver to Flamengo on a one-year spell as he had lost space in the first team squad and consistently suffered injuries. He debuted for his new club scoring the game winner header against Cruzeiro on 15 June 2016 at Mineirão Stadium.

=== Return to Atlético Mineiro ===
On 27 December 2018, Réver rejoined Atlético Mineiro on a three-year deal. In his second stint at Atlético, he added the Série A and Supercopa trophies to his record, in addition to another Copa do Brasil and four more Campeonato Mineiro wins. Réver announced his retirement at the end of the 2023 season as the most decorated player in the history of Atlético, with 12 titles won in total.

== International career ==
Réver made eight appearances for the Brazil national team between 2010 and 2013, with the debut coming in a 3–0 friendly win over Iran on 7 October 2010. His sole international goal was scored in his last match, a 2–2 friendly draw to Chile on 25 April 2013. He was an unused squad member in the 2013 FIFA Confederations Cup winning-campaign.

== Personal life ==
Réver's Brazilian ex-wife holds a German passport.

== Career statistics ==
=== Club ===
Appearances and goals by club, season and competition
Club	Season	League			State League		Cup		Continental		Other		Total	
Club	Season	Division	Apps	Goals	Apps	Goals	Apps	Goals	Apps	Goals	Apps	Goals	Apps	Goals
Paulista	2005	Série B	7	0	1 (Note: Appearances in Campeonato Paulista)	0	4	0	—		—		12	0
Paulista	2006	Série B	28	1	3	0	—		6 (Note: Appearances in Copa Libertadores)	0	—		37	1
Paulista	2007	Série B	4	1	18	2	—		—		—		22	3
Paulista	2008	Série C	—		16	0	—		—		—		16	0
Paulista	Total		39	2	38	2	4	0	6	0	—		87	4
Al Wahda (loan)	2007–08	UAE Arabian Gulf League	10	0	—		—		—		—		10	0
Grêmio	2008	Série A	35	2	—		—		1 (Note: Appearance(s) in Copa Sudamericana)	0	—		36	2
Grêmio	2009	Série A	31	5	14 (Note: Appearances in Campeonato Gaúcho)	0	—		12	2	—		57	7
Grêmio	2010	Série A	—		3	0	—		—		—		3	0
Grêmio	Total		66	7	17	0	—		13	2	—		96	9
VfL Wolfsburg	2009–10	Bundesliga	—		—		—		1 (Note: Appearance in UEFA Europa League)	0	—		1	0
Atlético Mineiro	2010	Série A	18	2	—		—		—		—		18	2
Atlético Mineiro	2011	Série A	30	4	13 (Note: Appearances in Campeonato Mineiro)	1	4	0	2	0	—		49	5
Atlético Mineiro	2012	Série A	28	6	14	0	4	1	—		—		46	7
Atlético Mineiro	2013	Série A	23	0	12	5	2	0	12	2	2 (Note: Appearances in FIFA Club World Cup)	0	51	7
Atlético Mineiro	2014	Série A	7	1	1	0	—		3	0	1 (Note: Appearances in Recopa Sudamericana)	0	12	1
Atlético Mineiro	Total		106	13	40	6	10	1	17	2	3	0	176	22
Internacional	2015	Série A	17	2	7	0	2	0	6	1	—		32	3
Internacional	2016	Série A	—		8	0	—		—		2 (Note: Appearances in Primeira Liga)	0	8	0
Internacional	Total		17	2	13	0	2	0	6	1	2	0	40	3
Flamengo	2016	Série A	29	2	—		—		1	0	—		30	2
Flamengo	2017	Série A	25	5	13 (Note: Appearances in Campeonato Carioca)	0	7	0	13 (Note: Six appearances in Copa Libertadores, seven appearances and one goal in Copa Sudamericana)	2	1	0	59	7
Flamengo	2018	Série A	26	2	6	0	6	0	6	0	—		44	2
Flamengo	Total		80	9	19	0	13	0	20	2	1	0	133	11
Atlético Mineiro	2019	Série A	28	1	6	1	4	0	14 (Note: Eight appearances and one goal in Copa Libertadores, six appearances and one goal in Copa Sudamericana)	2	—		52	4
Atlético Mineiro	2020	Série A	26	1	9	1	1	0	2	0	—		38	2
Atlético Mineiro	2021	Série A	22	0	5	0	8	2	6	0	—		41	2
Atlético Mineiro	2022	Série A	15	1	9	0	2	0	4	0	0	0	30	1
Atlético Mineiro	2023	Série A	9	0	5	0	1	0	3	0	—		18	0
Atlético Mineiro	Total		100	3	34	2	16	2	29	2	0	0	179	9
Atlético Mineiro total			206	16	74	8	26	3	46	4	3	0	355	31
Career total			418	36	161	10	45	3	92	9	6	0	722	58

=== International ===
Appearances and goals by national team and year
National team	Year	Apps	Goals
Brazil	2010	1	0
Brazil	2011	2	0
Brazil	2012	3	0
Brazil	2013	2	1
Total		8	1

Score and result list Brazil's goal tally first, score column indicates score after Réver goal.

List of international goals scored by Réver
No.	Date	Venue	Opponent	Score	Result	Competition
1	24 April 2013	Mineirão, Belo Horizonte, Brazil	Chile	1–1	2–2	Friendly

== Honours ==
Paulista

- Copa do Brasil: 2005

Atlético Mineiro

- Campeonato Mineiro: 2012, 2013, 2020, 2021, 2022, 2023
- Copa Libertadores: 2013
- Recopa Sudamericana: 2014
- Copa do Brasil: 2014, 2021
- Campeonato Brasileiro Série A: 2021
- Supercopa do Brasil: 2022

Internacional

- Campeonato Gaúcho: 2015, 2016

Flamengo

- Campeonato Carioca: 2017

Brazil

- Superclásico de las Américas: 2011, 2012
- FIFA Confederations Cup: 2013

Individual

- Campeonato Brasileiro Série A Team of the Year: 2011, 2012
- Campeonato Mineiro Team of the Year: 2011, 2012, 2013, 2020, 2022
- Bola de Prata: 2012, 2016
- South American Team of the Year: 2013
- Campeonato Carioca Team of the Year: 2017
