= Sport Club Aymorés =

Aymorés
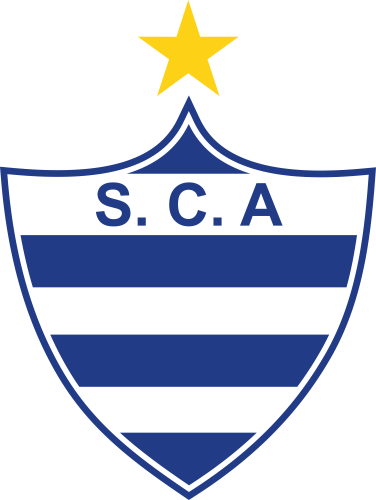
- Full name: Sport Club Aymorés
- Founded: 17 May 1926; 99 years ago
- Ground: Estádio Affonso de Carvalho
- President: Antonio Queiroz Jr.
- Head coach: Luciano Quadros
- League: Campeonato Mineiro Módulo II
- 2025: Mineiro, 11th of 12
Home colors	Away colors

Sport Club Aymorés, is a Brazilian football club from Ubá, Minas Gerais.

== History ==
Founded as Sport Club Santa Cruz on 17 May 1926, in honor of the neighborhood where it is located, it later changed to Sport Club Aymorés, the same name as a matchstick company in the city. It remained a social and amateur club for most of its history, only entering professional football at the end of the 1980s, remaining until 1994.

In 2020, it returned, winning the Campeonato Mineiro Segunda Divisão (third level) title, and remaining in Módulo II (second level) in the following years. In 2024, SC Aymorés was runner-up in the competition and promoted to the first division of the Campeonato Mineiro for the first time.

== Appearances ==
Following is the summary of Aymorés appearances in Campeonato Mineiro, since the club's return in 2020.

Season	Division	Final position
2020	3rd	1st
2021	2nd	11th
2022	2nd	10th
2023	2nd	6th
2024	2nd	2nd
2025	1st	11th (relegated)

== Honours ==
- Campeonato Mineiro Segunda Divisão
  - Winners (1): 2020
