= Fabril Esporte Clube =

Fabril
- Full name: Fabril Esporte Clube
- Nickname(s): Falcão da Zona Norte
- Founded: September 2, 1932
- Ground: Estádio Municipal Coronel Juventino Dias, Lavras, Minas Gerais state, Brazil
- Capacity: 5,000
- President: Luciane Pereira
- Head Coach: Paulini
- League: Campeonato Mineiro Segunda Divisão
- 2009: 13th
- Website: http://fabrilec.blogspot.com.br/
Home colours	Away colours

Fabril Esporte Clube, commonly known as Fabril, is a Brazilian football club based in Lavras, Minas Gerais state. They competed in the Série C in 1981 and 1988.

== History ==
The club was founded on September 2, 1932. They won the Campeonato Mineiro Second Level in 1984 and the Campeonato Mineiro do Interior in 1988. Fabril also competed in the Série C in 1988, when they were eliminated in the First Stage of the competition.

== Honours ==
=== State ===
- Campeonato Mineiro Módulo II
  - Winners (1): 1984
  - Runners-up (1): 1997
- Campeonato Mineiro do Interior
  - Winners (1): 1988

=== City ===
- Lavras Soccer League
  - Winners (5): 1949, 1953, 1956, 1957, 1958
  - Runners-up (3): 1950, 1952, 1957

== Stadium ==
Fabril Esporte Clube play their home games at Estádio Juventino Dias, commonly known as Estádio Municipal. The stadium has a maximum capacity of 5,000 people. They also play at Estádio UFLA, which is a property of the Federal University of Lavras, and it has a maximum capacity of 13,000 people.
