= Santa Cruz Futebol Clube (Minas Gerais) =

Santa Cruz
- Full name: Santa Cruz Futebol Clube
- Founded: May 3, 1951
- Ground: Januário Carneiro, Belo Horizonte, Minas Gerais, Brazil
- Capacity: 4,000
Home colours

Santa Cruz Futebol Clube, commonly known as Santa Cruz, is a Brazilian football club based in Belo Horizonte, Minas Gerais.

== History ==
Founded on 3 May 1951, the club was widely known for his amateur football. It was one of the most successful teams in Copa Itatiaia, being crowned champions four times.

Its youth setup is also known for having players like Dedé (a former Borussia Dortmund player), Evanílson, Adeílson, Moisés and Bruno.

Santa Cruz also holds a good reputation when related to its women's football team, as it was crowned champions of Campeonato Mineiro Feminino in 2014. Its biggest revelation was Marta, who played for the club from 2002 to 2004.
