= Coimbra Sports =

Brazilian football club based in Contagem

Coimbra
- Full name: Coimbra Sports
- Nickname: Laranja Mecânica
- Founded: 5 January 1986; 39 years ago
- Ground: CT Flávio Pentagna Guimarães, Contagem, Minas Gerais state, Brazil
Home colours	Away colours

Coimbra Sports, previously Coimbra Esporte Clube, commonly known as Coimbra, is a Brazilian football club based in Contagem, Minas Gerais state.

== History ==
The club was founded on 5 January 1986. The club competed for the first time in a professional competition in 2010, when they participated in the Campeonato Mineiro Segunda Divisão, being eliminated in the First Stage of the competition.

They won the 2018 Campeonato Mineiro-Segunda Divisão and the 2019 Campeonato Mineiro-Módulo II. In 2020 they played for first time the Campeonato Mineiro.

== Honours ==
- Campeonato Mineiro Módulo II
  - Winners (1): 2019
- Campeonato Mineiro Segunda Divisão
  - Winners (2): 2018, 2025

== Stadium ==
Coimbra Sports play their home games at Centro de Treinamentos Flávio Pentagna Guimarães. They played their 2020 Campeonato Mineiro home matches at Estádio Independência.
