= Flamengo Esporte Clube =

Flamengo
- Full name: Flamengo Esporte Clube
- Founded: 8 August 1979
- Dissolved: 1993
- Ground: Estádio Rubro-Negro, Varginha, Minas Gerais state, Brazil
- Capacity: 2,000
Home colours	Away colours

Flamengo Esporte Clube, commonly known as Flamengo, was a Brazilian football club based in Varginha, Minas Gerais state.

== History ==
The club was founded on 8 August 1979. Flamengo won the Campeonato Mineiro Second Level in 1988. The club folded in 1993.

== Honours ==
- Campeonato Mineiro Módulo II
  - Winners (2): 1969, 1988

== Stadium ==
Flamengo Esporte Clube played their home games at Estádio Rubro-Negro. The stadium has a maximum capacity of 2,000 people.
