= Nacional Futebol Clube (MG) =

Nacional de Uberaba
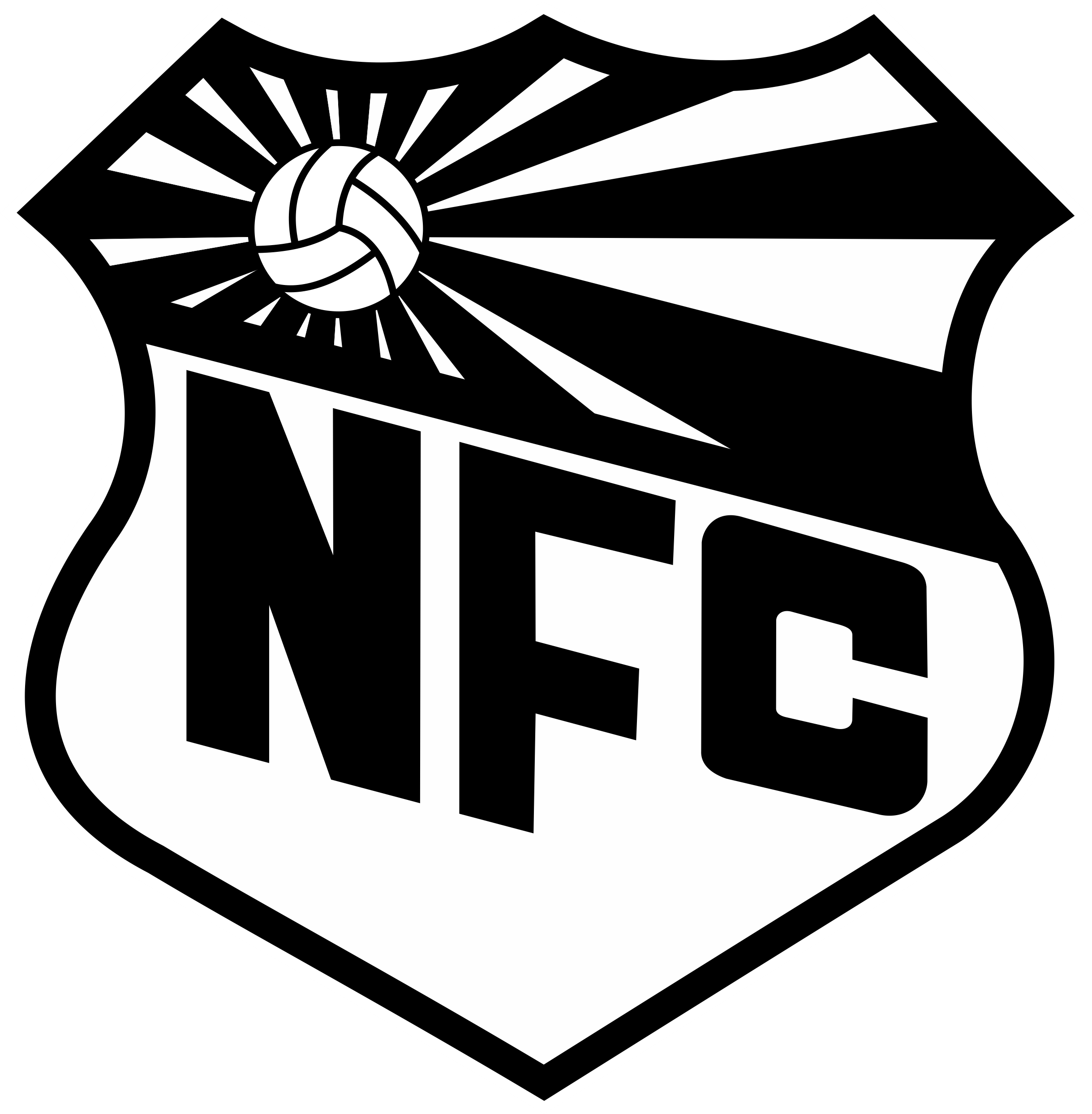
- Full name: Nacional Futebol Clube
- Nickname(s): Naça; Alvi-negro da Rodovia; Elefantão; Expressinho do São Benedito
- Founded: August 1, 1944
- Ground: Uberabão
- Capacity: 25,000
- President: Márcio José da Silva
- Head coach: Lúcio Vaz
Home colors	Away colors

Nacional Futebol Clube, commonly known as Nacional de Uberaba, is a Brazilian football team based in Uberaba, Minas Gerais state.

== History ==
The club was founded on August 1, 1944. Nacional won the Campeonato Mineiro Second Level in 1963, 1979, and in 1982.

== Honours ==
- Campeonato Mineiro Módulo II
  - Winners (3): 1963, 1978, 1982
- Campeonato Mineiro Segunda Divisão
  - Winners (1): 2013
- Torneio Incentivo Mineiro
  - Winners (1): 1978

== Stadium ==
Nacional Futebol Clube play their home games at Uberabão. The stadium has a maximum capacity of 25,000 people.
