= Esporte Clube Itaúna =

Brazilian football club

Itaúna
- Full name: Esporte Clube Itaúna
- Nickname: Cachorrão (Great Dog)
- Founded: 29 September 1929
- Dissolved: 30 July 2021; 4 years ago
- Ground: José Flávio de Carvalho
- Capacity: 6.000
- Chairman: José Hailton Antunes Mendes
- Manager: Laelson Lopes Cesar Gomes
- League: Campeonato Mineiro Módulo II
Home colours	Away colours

Esporte Clube Itaúna was a football club from the city of Itaúna, Minas Gerais, founded on 29 September 1929. It was founded as Itaúna Foot-Ball Club. The biggest triumph of the club was in 1964 when they beat Cruzeiro, with Tostão and Piazza in the lineup, 2:1 in a friendly match inaugurating their current home field Estádio Municipal José Flávio de Carvalho.

== Current squad (selected) ==
Note: Flags indicate national team as defined under FIFA eligibility rules; some limited exceptions apply. Players may hold more than one non-FIFA nationality.

No.	Pos.	Nation	Player
—	FW	BRA	Faísca (on loan from América-MG; )

== Titles ==
=== Domestic ===
- Campeonato Mineiro Módulo II runners-up: 2007.

=== Youth ===
- Campeonato Mineiro U-15: 2007.
