= Valeriodoce Esporte Clube =

Valério
- Full name: Valeriodoce Esporte Clube
- Nicknames: Dragão; Valério
- Founded: November 22, 1942
- Ground: Estádio Israel Pinheiro, Itabira, Minas Gerais state, Brazil
- Capacity: 4,500
- President: Reginaldo de Sá
- Head Coach: Wantuil Rodrigues
- 2018: Mineiro 2ªDivisão, 3rd
Home colours	Away colours

Valeriodoce Esporte Clube, commonly known as Valério, is a Brazilian football club based in Itabira, Minas Gerais state. They competed in the Série B and in the Série C once.

== History ==
The club was founded on November 22, 1942. Valério won the Campeonato Mineiro Second Level in 1964. They competed in the Série B in 1988 and in the Série C in 1993, but failed to gain promotion in both seasons.

== Former Players ==
(Brazil) Jacksen F. Tiago (1993)

== Honours ==
- Campeonato Mineiro Módulo II
  - Winners (1): 1964
- Torneio Incentivo Mineiro
  - Winners (1): 1980
- Campeonato Mineiro do Interior
  - Winners (3): 1969, 1971, 1978
- Torneio Início do Campeonato Mineiro
  - Winners (2): 1962, 1969

== Stadium ==
Valeriodoce Esporte Clube play their home games at Estádio Israel Pinheiro. The stadium has a maximum capacity of 4,500 people.
