= Funorte Esporte Clube =

Funorte
- Full name: Funorte Esporte Clube
- Nickname(s): FEC; Formigão
- Founded: May 4, 2007
- Ground: Estádio José Maria de Melo, Montes Claros, Minas Gerais state, Brazil
- Capacity: 5,000
- President: Tânia Raquel de Queiroz Muniz
- Head Coach: Wagner Oliveira
| Home colors | Away colors |

Funorte Esporte Clube, commonly known as Funorte, is a Brazilian football club located in Montes Claros, Minas Gerais state.

== History ==
The club was founded on March 3, 2007. Funorte won the Campeonato Mineiro Segunda Divisão in 2008.

== Achievements ==
- Campeonato Mineiro Segunda Divisão:
  - Winners (1): 2008

== Season records ==
| Season | Campeonato Mineiro | | | | | Copa MG |
| Season | Division | Format | Stage | Position | Position | Copa MG |
|---|---|---|---|---|---|---|
| 2007 | C | 2g10-2g5 | Round Robin | 5th | 11th | - |
| 2008 | C | 3g4-g6 | Final Round | Champions | | - |
| 2009 | B | g12 | Round Robin | 4th | | |
| 2010 | B | 2g6-2g4-2 | Second Stage | 2nd | RU^{Note 1} | 6th/6 |
| 2011 | A | g12*-4 | Round Robin | 12th | | |

Note:
1) After several appeals, when it came to the last sporting tribunal (STJD), Mamoré lost 6 points for fielding an irregular player. Therefore, Funorte were declared runners-up and were promoted
References: rsssfbrasil

== Stadium ==
Funorte Esporte Clube play their home games at Estádio José Maria de Melo. The stadium has a maximum capacity of 5,000 people.
