= Nacional Esporte Clube Ltda =

Nacional
- Full name: Nacional Esporte Clube Ltda.
- Nickname(s): Búfalos
- Founded: June 28, 2008; 17 years ago
- Website: www.nacionalesporte.com.br
Home colors	Away colors

Nacional Esporte Clube Ltda. is a football club from the south-east Brazilian state of Minas Gerais.

The club, founded on 28 June 2008 in Coronel Fabriciano as Fabriciano Futebol Clube, changed its name after it moved in March 2010 to Nova Serrana. There it played in the Estádio Municipal. In 2013, Nacional established itself in Patos de Minas.

Nacional de Nova Serrana won the Campeonato Mineiro Segunda Divisão in 2010.

== Achievements ==
- Campeonato Mineiro Segunda Divisão:
  - Winners (1): 2010
