= Nova Serrana =

Coordinates: 19°52′S 44°59′W

- Municipality
- Municipality of Nova Serrana

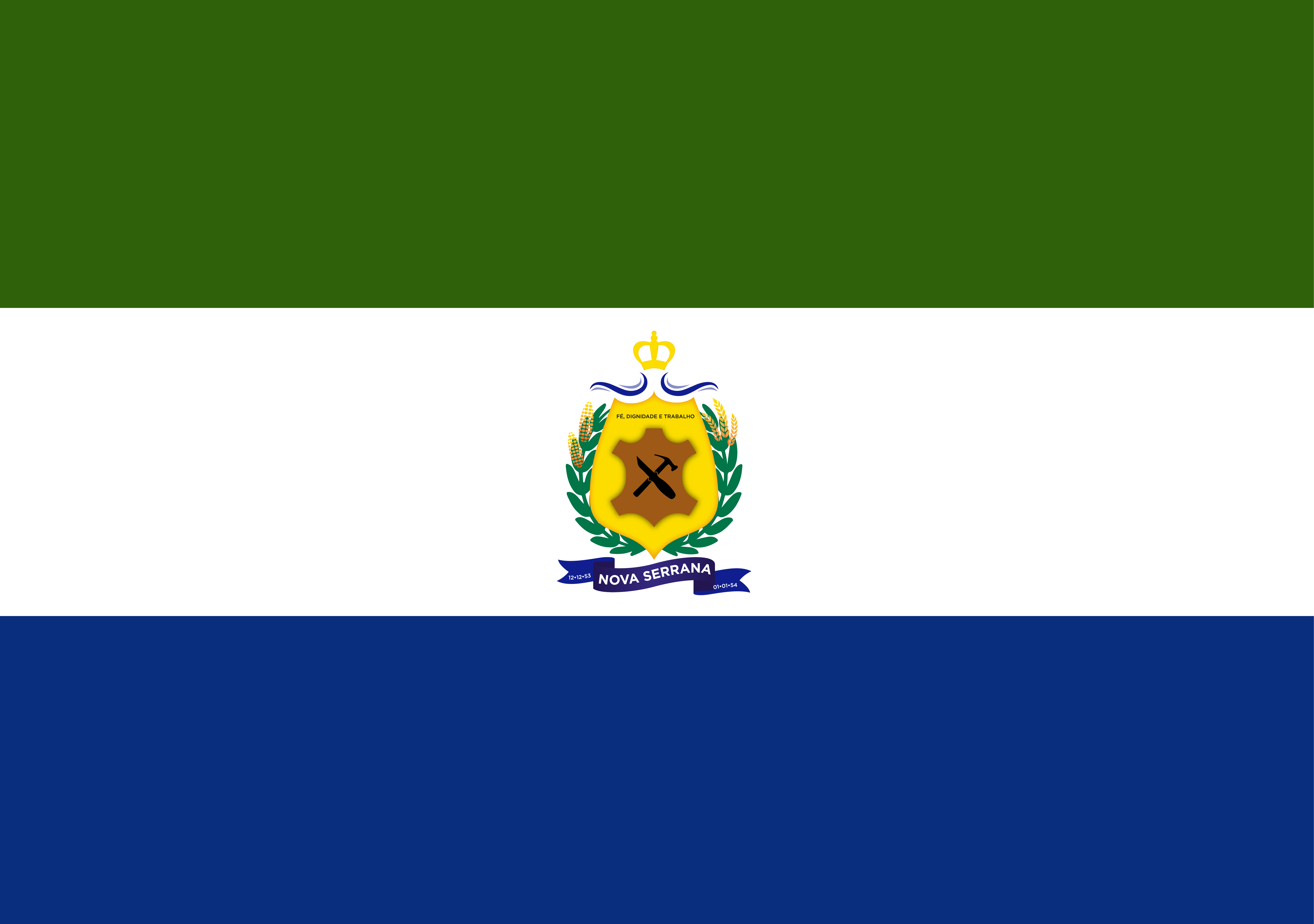
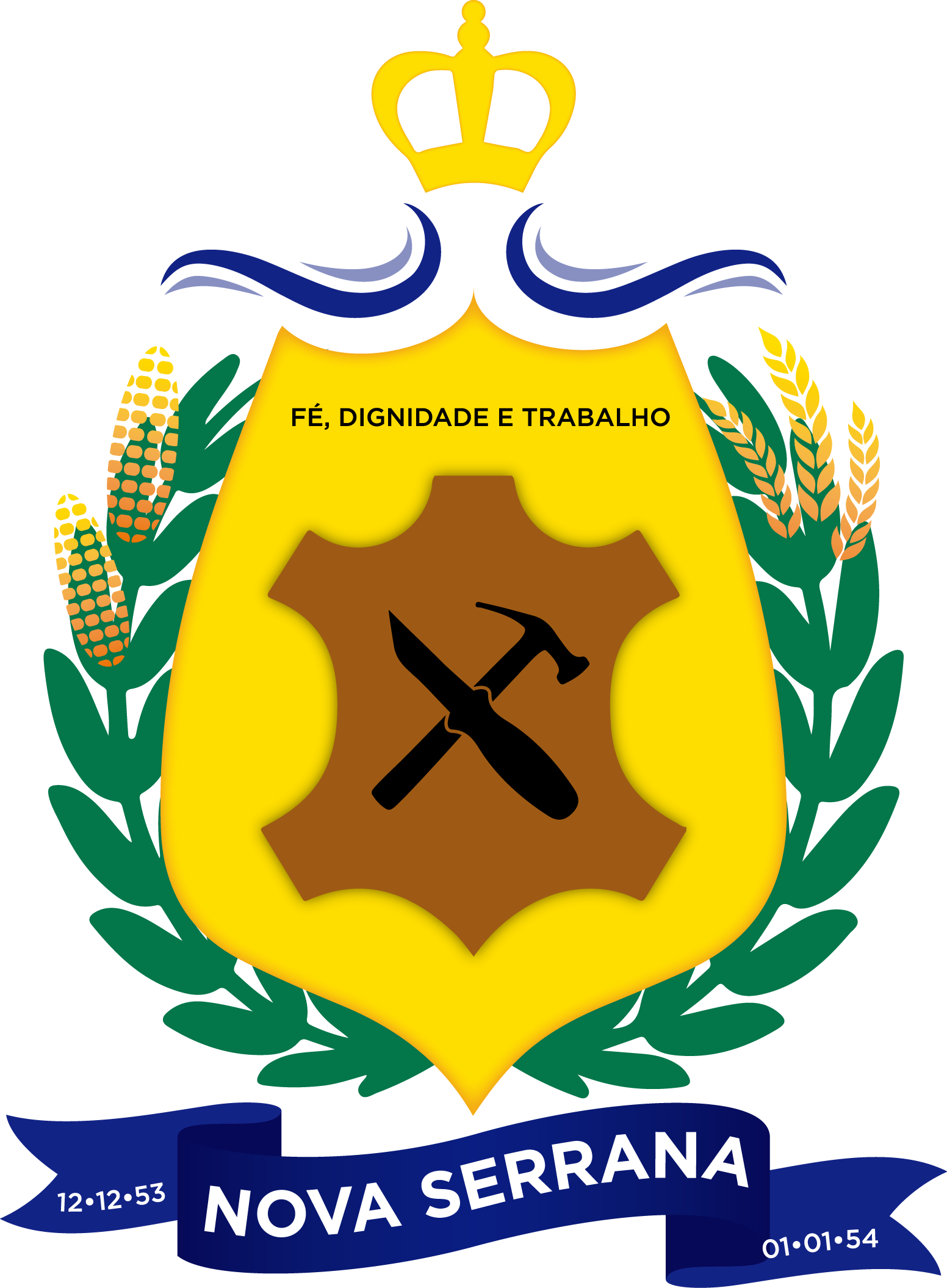
- Flag Coat of arms

- Location in Minas Gerais
- Country: Brazil
- Region: Southeast
- State: Minas Gerais
- Mesoregion: Oeste de Minas

Area
  - Total: 282.472 km^{2} (109.063 sq mi)

Population (2022 Census)
  - Total: 105,552
  - Estimate (2025): 114,791
  - Density: 373.672/km^{2} (967.807/sq mi)
- Time zone: UTC−3 (BRT)
- HDI (2010): 0.715 – high

Nova Serrana is a municipality in the state of Minas Gerais in the Southeast region of Brazil.

== See also ==
- List of municipalities in Minas Gerais
