= Uberaba Sport Club =

Uberaba
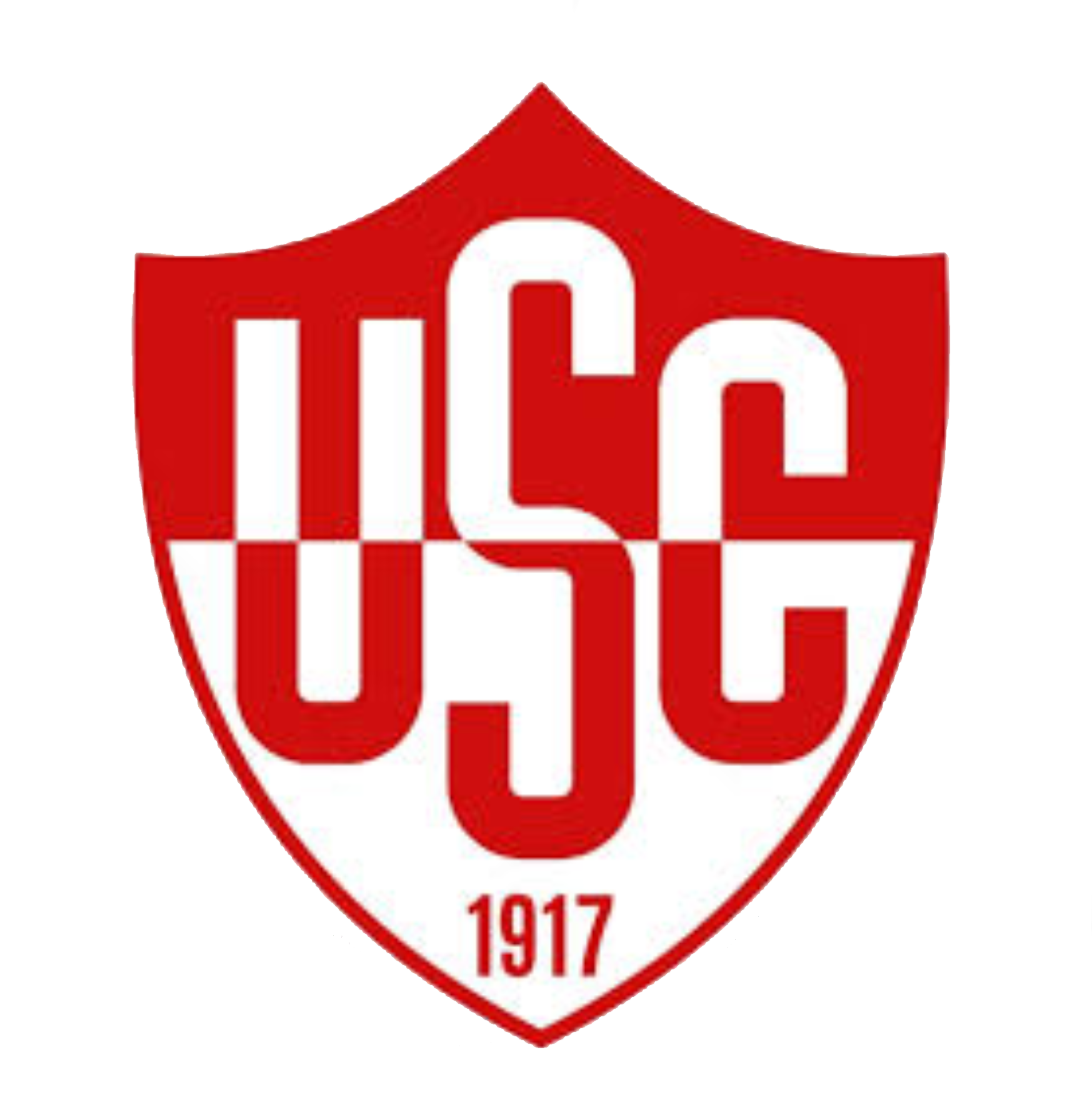
- Full name: Uberaba Sport Club
- Nicknames: Colorado; Zebu
- Founded: July 15, 1917; 109 years ago
- Ground: Uberabão, Uberaba, Minas Gerais
- Capacity: 25,000
- Manager: Thiago Oliveira
- League: Campeonato Mineiro Módulo II
- 2025: Mineiro Módulo II, 8th of 12
Home colors	Away colors

Uberaba Sport Club is a traditional Brazilian football club from Uberaba, Minas Gerais state. Their colors are red and white and their nicknames are "Colorado" and "Zebu" (mascot of the team and symbol of the city of Uberaba).

== History ==
The club was founded on July 15, 1917.

In 1976, Uberaba was promoted to the Serie A and played for three years. In 1979, they had their best position in Brazilian leagues, finishing 17th. The club played in Serie B from 1980 to 1982, and reached promoted to top flight in 1982, but were immediately relegated in 1983.

They won the Campeonato Mineiro Módulo II in 2003, and the Taça Minas Gerais in 1980, 2009, and in 2010.

Their biggest rivals are Nacional de Uberaba and Uberlândia.

== Honours ==
=== Official tournaments ===
State
Competitions	Titles	Seasons
Taça Minas Gerais	3	1980, 2009, 2010
Campeonato Mineiro Módulo II	1	2003
Campeonato Mineiro Segunda Divisão	2	2015, 2021

=== Others tournaments ===
==== State ====
- Campeonato Mineiro do Interior (5): 1966, 1973, 1980, 1981, 1982

==== State Regional ====
- Campeonato do Triângulo (4): 1931, 1935, 1954, 1955
- Copa do Triângulo (1): 1957

=== Runners-up ===
- Taça Minas Gerais (1): 2006
- Campeonato Mineiro Módulo II (1): 2007
- Campeonato Mineiro Segunda Divisão (1): 2024
