= Formiga Esporte Clube =

Formiga
- Full name: Formiga Esporte Clube
- Nickname(s): O Glorioso
- Founded: March 17, 1929
- Ground: Estádio Juca Pedro, Formiga, Minas Gerais state, Brazil
- Capacity: 2,500
- 2017: Mineiro Módulo II, 12th (W.O.)
Home colors	Away colors

Formiga Esporte Clube, commonly known as Formiga, is a currently inactive Brazilian football club based in Formiga, Minas Gerais state.

== History ==
The club was founded on May 7, 1929. The club won the Campeonato dos Campeões do Interior in 1950, Campeonato Mineiro Second Level in 1965, and the Campeonato Mineiro do Interior in 1967.

== Honours ==
- Campeonato Mineiro Módulo II
  - Winners (1): 1965
- Campeonato Mineiro do Interior
  - Winners (1): 1967

== Stadium ==
Formiga Esporte Clube play their home games at Estádio Juca Pedro. The stadium has a maximum capacity of 2,500 people.
