= Campeonato Mineiro Segunda Divisão =

Football league in Minas Gerais, Brazi

- Organising body: FMF
- Founded: 1969; 57 years ago
- Country: Brazil
- State: Minas Gerais
- Level on pyramid: 3
- Promotion to: Campeonato Mineiro Módulo II
- Current champions: Coimbra (2nd title) (2025)
- Most championships: Mamoré (3 titles)
- Website: FMF Official website

The Campeonato Mineiro Segunda Divisão is the third tier of the professional state football league in the Brazilian state of Minas Gerais. It is run by the Minas Gerais Football Federation (FMF).

== List of champions ==
=== Primeira Divisão ===
Season	Champions	Runners-up
1969	Nacional de Muriaé (1)	Athletic

=== Terceira Divisão ===
Season	Champions	Runners-up
1986	Comercial (1)	Patrocinense
1987	Ipiranga (1)	Clube dos Cem
1988	Derminas (1)	Bela Vista
1989	Ribeiro Junqueira (1)	Araguari
1990	Mamoré (1)	América (MS)

=== Segunda Divisão ===
Season	Champions	Runners-up
1994	Guarani (1)	Sete de Setembro
1995	Social (1)	Montes Claros
1996	Ateneu (1)	Venda Nova
1997	Sete de Setembro (1)	Fabril
1998	Passos (1)	Ipatinga
1999	Ateneu (2)	Alfenense
2000	Patrocinense (1)	América de Alfenas
2001	Paraisense (1)	Ituiutabana
2002	Tombense (1)	União Araxá
2003	Unitri (1)	Democrata (SL)
2004	Olympic (1)	Patrocinense
2005	Juventus (1)	Varginha
2006	Tombense (2)	Ideal (SL)
2007	Araxá (1)	Itaúna
2008	Funorte (1)	América (TO)
2009	Mamoré (2)	Tombense
2010	Nacional (NS) (1)	SE Patrocinense
2011	Araxá (2)	Social
2012	Minas Boca (1)	Democrata (SL)
2013	Nacional de Uberaba (1)	Montes Claros
2014	CAP (1)	Nacional de Muriaé
2015	Uberaba (1)	Formiga
2016	Tupynambás (1)	Betinense
2017	Ipatinga (1)	Democrata (SL)
2018	Coimbra (1)	Athletic
2019	Pouso Alegre (1)	Betim
2020	Aymorés (1)	União Luziense
2021	Uberaba (2)	Varginha
2022	North (1)	Coimbra B
2023	Mamoré (3)	Valerio
2024	Guarani (2)	Uberaba
2025	Coimbra (2)	Boa Esporte

=== Notes ===
- FC Betinense changed their name to CA Serranense and moved from Betim to Nova Serrana.

== Titles by team ==
Teams in bold still active.

Rank	Club	Winners	Winning years
1	**Mamoré**	3	1990, 2009, 2023
2	**Araxá**	2	2007, 2011
2	Ateneu	2	1996, 1999
2	**Coimbra**	2	2018, 2025
2	**Guarani**	2	1994, 2024
2	**Tombense**	2	2002, 2006
2	**Uberaba**	2	2015, 2021
8	**Aymorés**	1	2020
8	CAP	1	2014
8	Comercial	1	1986
8	Derminas	1	1988
8	Funorte	1	2008
8	**Ipatinga**	1	2017
8	Ipiranga	1	1987
8	**Juventus**	1	2005
8	Minas Boca	1	2012
8	**Nacional de Muriaé**	1	1969
8	**Nacional de Uberaba**	1	2013
8	Nacional (NS)	1	2010
8	**North**	1	2022
8	Olympic	1	2004
8	Paraisense	1	2001
8	**Passos**	1	1998
8	**Patrocinense**	1	2000
8	**Pouso Alegre**	1	2019
8	Ribeiro Junqueira	1	1989
8	Sete de Setembro	1	1997
8	**Social**	1	1995
8	**Tupynambás**	1	2016
8	Unitri	1	2003

=== By city ===
City	Championships	Clubs
Montes Claros	4	Ateneu (2), Funorte (1), North (1)
Patos de Minas	3	Mamoré (3)
Uberaba	3	Uberaba (2), Nacional (1)
Araxá	2	Araxá (2)
Contagem	2	Coimbra (2)
Divinópolis	2	Guarani (2)
Tombos	2	Tombense (2)
Uberlândia	2	CAP (1), Unitri (1)
Barbacena	1	Olympic (1)
Belo Horizonte	1	Sete de Setembro (1)
Campo Belo	1	Comercial (1)
Coronel Fabriciano	1	Social (1)
Ipatinga	1	Ipatinga (1)
Juiz de Fora	1	Tupynambás (1)
Leopoldina	1	Ribeiro Junqueira (1)
Manhuaçu	1	Ipiranga (1)
Minas Novas	1	Juventus (1)
Monte Carmelo	1	Derminas (1)
Muriaé	1	Nacional (1)
Nova Serrana	1	Nacional (1)
Passos	1	Passos (1)
Patrocínio	1	Patrocinense (1)
Pouso Alegre	1	Pouso Alegre (1)
São Sebastião do Paraíso	1	Paraisense (1)
Sete Lagoas	1	Minas Boca (1)
Ubá	1	Aymorés (1)
