= Ipatinga Futebol Clube =

Brazilian football club

Ipatinga
- Full name: Ipatinga Futebol Clube
- Nicknames: Tigrão (Big Tiger); Quadricolor (Quadracolor)
- Founded: 21 May 1998; 27 years ago
- Ground: Ipatingão
- Capacity: 25,000
- Owner: Marcos Ferraz
- President: João Foureaux Travassos
- Head coach: José Ângelo
- League: Campeonato Mineiro Módulo II
- 2025: Mineiro Módulo II, 4th of 12
Home colors	Away colors

Ipatinga Futebol Clube is a Brazilian football club based in Ipatinga, state of Minas Gerais, founded on 21 May 1998. During the 2013 season, the club played in Betim, shortly after returned to Ipatinga in 2015.

On 22 May 2022, the club was acquired by businessman Marcos Ferraz, through his conglomerate Kraken Holding, Inc, who took over management immediately, transforming the club into SAF (anonymous football company) and registered its squad to participate. of the championship of the same year.

== History ==
The club was founded on 21 May 1998 by entrepreneur Itair Machado, a former player for Atlético Mineiro and Cruzeiro, and at the time the sponsor of Social Futebol Clube, a club located in Coronel Fabriciano city (a neighbor city of Ipatinga), with the support of Gercy Mathias, who was the president of the amateur club Novo Cruzeiro Futebol Clube, located in Ipatinga's neighborhood of Novo Cruzeiro; Cosme Mattos, former sportsman; Doctor Rinaldo Campos Soares, president of Sistema Usiminas; Doctor Ronaldo Monteiro de Souza, president of Usisaúde, and Francisco Carlos Delfino (also known as "Chico Ferramenta"), then mayor of Ipatinga. Together, they professionalized Novo Cruzeiro Futebol Clube and renamed the club as Ipatinga Futebol Clube.

After establishing a team of professional players, the administrators entered the team to the state championship where the team came second in the second division in 1998. In the following year, the team competed in the first division, coming second in the Second Module of the division. As a result, in 2000 Ipatinga Futebol Clube played against the state's elite teams throughout the First Module of the first Division, ending the competition in fourth place.

Seven years after its foundation, the team won the 2005 state title, beating Cruzeiro and finished as runner-up of the competition the following year. In the 2006, Ipatinga competed in the Copa do Brasil, which is the second most important national competition in Brazil. To reach the semifinals, the team beat Botafogo and Santos, respectively the champions of that year's (2006)Rio de Janeiro and São Paulo state championships. However, Ipatinga was eliminated by Flamengo, of Rio de Janeiro, in the semifinals. Shortly after the competition was over, three players and the coach of Ipatinga transferred to Flamengo. In 2006, the club also finished third in the Campeonato Brasileiro Série C, thus being promoted to the following year's Brazilian Championship Second Level. After finishing runner up in the 2007's Campeonato Brasileiro Série B, Ipatinga gained promotion to the elite of Brazilian football in 2008's Série A.

In 2008, Ipatinga was relegated twice in the same season, first from the State Championship, and then from the Série A. In the following years, the club had mixed results, with eventual good campaigns in some championships followed by relegations in others. In 2012, due to a severe financial crisis and losing the support of the Ipatinga population, the club decided to move to Betim, changing its name to Betim Esporte Clube.

== New Club ==
After 40 million reais in debt and no support, due to the club's many controversies, president Nicanor Pires announced the end of activities and its bankruptcy, which generated great national commotion in the sports environment, but even with all this movement, the club was scheduled to close completely on April 22, 2022.

On the morning of April 22, Marcos Ferraz, through Kraken Holding, Inc. presented its proposal to acquire the club and transform it into SAF (sociedade anônima do futebol), a proposal that was quickly approved by the entire management and board of the club. At 6:00pm, Ipatinga Futebol Clube releases an official statement informing that the SAF agreement was made, that the first financial contributions had been made and that Ferraz would assume the management of the club from that moment on.

In its debut in the Campeonato Mineiro on April 27, just 5 days after its acquisition, Ipatinga Futebol Clube starts its campaign making an incredible 2x0 in the first half against the Tupi team.

== Current squad ==
=== 2013 season roster ===
Note: Flags indicate national team as defined under FIFA eligibility rules; some limited exceptions apply. Players may hold more than one non-FIFA nationality.

No.	Pos.	Nation	Player
—	GK	BRA	Bruno
—	GK	BRA	Felipe Sánchez
—	GK	BRA	Gustavo
—	DF	BRA	Azevedo
—	DF	BRA	Eron
—	DF	BRA	Guilherme Alves
—	DF	BRA	Irineu
—	DF	BRA	Pablo
—	DF	BRA	Pedrão
—	DF	BRA	Vinícius
—	DF	BRA	André Luiz
—	DF	BRA	Neno
—	DF	BRA	Stanley

No.	Pos.	Nation	Player
—	DF	BRA	Totonho
—	MF	BRA	Denílson
—	MF	BRA	Geovane
—	MF	BRA	Uchôa
—	MF	BRA	Zotti
—	MF	BRA	Bruninho
—	MF	BRA	Gedeon
—	MF	BRA	Joélson
—	MF	BRA	Robert
—	FW	BRA	Chico Marcelo
—	FW	BRA	Cristiano
—	FW	BRA	Marion
—	FW	BRA	Thiago

== Notable coaches ==
- (Brazil) Ney Franco (2005–06)
- (Brazil) Ney da Matta (2006, 2011)
- (Brazil) Flávio Lopes (2007)
- (Brazil) Gilson Kleina (2007, 2010)
- (Brazil) Giba (2008)
- (Brazil) Ricardo Drubscky (2008)
- (Brazil) Márcio Bittencourt (2008)
- (Brazil) Enderson Moreira (2008)
- (Brazil) Marcelo Oliveira (2009)
- (Brazil) Émerson Ávila (2007)
- (Brazil) Léo Condé (2010)
- (Brazil) Gerson Evaristo (2010–11)
- (Brazil) Guilherme (2011)
- (Brazil) Eugênio Souza (2012–2013)
- (Brazil) Wallace Lemos (2013)
- (Brazil) Moacir Júnior (2013)
- (Brazil) Reinaldo (2014)
- (Brazil) Ney da Matta (2014)
- (Brazil) Pedro Henrique (2014)
- (Brazil) Wasterdeily Lima (2015)
- (Brazil) Conrado Ramos (2016)
- (Brazil) Wantuil Rodrigues (2017)
- (Brazil) Eugênio Souza (2017–)

- Campeonato Mineiro do Interior
  - Winners (4): 2000, 2005, 2006, 2010

== Honours ==
=== Official tournaments ===
State
Competitions	Titles	Seasons
Campeonato Mineiro	1	2005
Taça Minas Gerais	2	2004, 2011
Campeonato Mineiro Módulo II	1	2009
Campeonato Mineiro Segunda Divisão	1	2017

=== Others tournaments ===
==== State ====
- Campeonato Mineiro do Interior (4): 2000, 2005, 2006, 2010

=== Runners-up ===
- Campeonato Brasileiro Série B (1): 2007
- Campeonato Mineiro (3): 2002, 2006, 2010
- Taça Minas Gerais (1): 2000
- Campeonato Mineiro Módulo II (2): 1999, 2022
- Campeonato Mineiro Segunda Divisão (1): 1998

=== Women's Football ===
- Campeonato Mineiro de Futebol Feminino (1): 2015

== Stadium ==
For 14 years, the club played in the Municipal Stadium Epaminondas Mendes Brito (later named João Lamego Netto), usually known as Ipatingão or Lamegão, built in 1982, with a maximum capacity of 15,000 people. Nowadays the club awaits the construction of a football stadium in Betim, and will probably play in other cities, such as Sete Lagoas, in the first semester of 2013.

== Colors and symbols ==
The club colors are the same colors as the city of Ipatinga's. The mascot is a tiger, and was chosen in a popular contest. The tiger had 7948 votes, in second the eagle had 2529 votes, in third the cat had 846 votes, in fourth the parakeet had 713 votes, and in fifth the parrot had 202 votes.
