= Esporte Clube Mamoré =

Brazilian football club

Mamoré
- Full name: Esporte Clube Mamoré
- Nickname: Sapo (Toad)
- Founded: June 13, 1949
- Ground: Estádio Bernardo Rubinger de Queiroz, Patos de Minas, Minas Gerais, Brazil
- Capacity: 10,252
- Chairman: Marcelo Reis Batista da Silva
- League: Campeonato Mineiro Segunda Divisão
- 2023: 1st of 17 (promoted)
Home colours	Away colours

Esporte Clube Mamoré is a Brazilian football team, from the city of Patos de Minas, Minas Gerais. It is one of the most important clubs in the interior of Minas Gerais, having participated in the Copa Sul-Minas, Campeonato Brasileiro Série C and Taça São Paulo de Futebol Júnior. Their biggest rival is URT, also from Patos de Minas.

== History ==
On June 13, 1949, Esporte Clube Mamoré was founded. Mamoré only became a professional club in 1989.

In 2001, the club disputed the Campeonato Brasileiro Série C, being eliminated in the first stage.

On November 1, 2026, a mass brawl occurred during a match between Mamoré and Uberlândia for the Campeonato Mineiro Under-20 Second Division. This resulted in the referee abandoning the match and giving a total of 53 red cards, which became the new world record for the most red cards given in one match.

== Current squad (selected) ==
Note: Flags indicate national team as defined under FIFA eligibility rules; some limited exceptions apply. Players may hold more than one non-FIFA nationality.

No.	Pos.	Nation	Player
—	DF	BRA	Rafael Estevam (on loan from América-MG; )
—	DF	BRA	Wagner (on loan from América-MG; )

No.	Pos.	Nation	Player
—	MF	BRA	Geovane (on loan from América-MG; )

== Honours ==
=== State ===
- Campeonato Mineiro Módulo II
  - Winners (3): 1991, 2000, 2014
- Campeonato Mineiro Segunda Divisão
  - Winners (3): 1990, 2009, 2023
- Campeonato Mineiro do Interior
  - Winners (2): 1995, 2001

=== City ===
- Campeonato Citadino de Patos de Minas
  - Winners (6): 1956, 1969, 1971, 1973, 1974, 1989

== Mamoré anthem ==
Leão de Formosa wrote the anthem, while José Dias dos Reis provided the music.

== Symbol and mascot ==
Its symbol and mascot is the toad, or sapo in Portuguese.
