= América Futebol Clube (Teófilo Otoni) =

Brazilian football club

América
- Full name: América Futebol Clube - Teófilo Otoni
- Nicknames: Mecão; Mecão Maravilha; Maior do Interior; América de Tchó Tchó
- Founded: 12 May 1936
- Ground: Estádio Nassri Mattar (Arena do Dragão), Teófilo Otoni, Brazil
- Capacity: 5,000
- Chairman: João Gabriel Prates
- Head coach: Gilmar Estevam
- League: Campeonato Mineiro Segunda Divisão - Campeonato Mineiro Módulo III
- 2022: Mineiro Módulo III,
Home colours	Away colours	Third colours

América Futebol Clube, or simply América, is a Brazilian football team from Teófilo Otoni, Minas Gerais. Founded on May 12, 1936, since 2004 they continuously competed in Campeonato Mineiro. In 2009, they were promoted to the top-tier of Campeonato Mineiro for the first time.

== Honours ==
- Campeonato Mineiro do Interior
  - Winners (1): 2011

== Season Records ==
Season	Campeonato Mineiro					Copa MG	Campeonato Brasileiro			Copa do Brasil
Season	Division	Format	Stage	Position	Position	Copa MG	Division	Stage	Position	Copa do Brasil
2004	C	g3-2	First Stage	2nd	advance					
2004	C	2g4-2	Final Group Stage	4th						
2005	C	g6	Final Round	6th		1st stage				
2006	C	g5-2	First Stage	5th	eliminated					
2007	-	-	-	-	-					
2008	C	g6-2p	Final Stage	Runners-up						
2009	B	g12-3p	Round Robin	3rd						
2010	A	g12*-8	First Stage	9th						
2011	A	g12*-4	Semifinals	Elim.	4th		D	withdrew		
2022	C	g6-2	Semifinals	Elim.	4th		D	withdrew		

== Stadium ==
Their home stadium is the Nassri Mattar stadium, capacity 5,000.
