= Nacional Atlético Clube (MG) =

Nacional de Muriaé
- Full name: Nacional Atlético Clube
- Founded: 25 December 1927; 97 years ago
- Ground: Estádio Soares de Azevedo
- Capacity: 13,971
- Head Coach: Gian Rodrigues
- League: Mineiro Segunda Divisão
- 2024: Mineiro Módulo II, 7th
Home colours	Away colours

Nacional Atlético Clube, commonly known as Nacional de Muriaé, is a Brazilian football club based in Muriaé, Minas Gerais state.

== History ==
The club was founded on December 25, 1927. Nacional de Muriaé won the Campeonato Mineiro Second Level in 1969.

== Honours ==
- Campeonato Mineiro Segunda Divisão
  - Winners (1): 1969
- Torneio Incentivo Mineiro
  - Winners (1): 1977

== Stadium ==
Nacional Atlético Clube play their home games at Estádio Soares de Azevedo. The stadium has a maximum capacity of 13,971 people.
