= Campeonato Mineiro Módulo II =

State football league of Minas Gerais, Brazil

- Organising body: FMF
- Founded: 1917; 109 years ago
- Country: Brazil
- State: Minas Gerais
- Level on pyramid: 2
- Promotion to: Campeonato Mineiro
- Relegation to: Campeonato Mineiro Segunda Divisão
- Current champions: Villa Nova (3rd title) (2026)
- Most championships: Araxá (4 titles)
- Website: FMF Official website

The Campeonato Mineiro Módulo II is the second tier of the professional state football league in the Brazilian state of Minas Gerais. It is run by the Minas Gerais Football Federation (FMF).

== List of champions ==
=== Amateur era ===
The first era of second tier of Minas Gerais football was the Serie B of the championship of municipality of Belo Horizonte.

Season	Champions
1915	Ipanema (1)
1916	Unknown
1917	Flamengo (1)
1918–1919	Unknown
1920	Ipanema (2)
1921	Progresso (1)
1922	Palmeiras (1)
1923	Guarany (1)
1924–1926	Not held
1927	Calafate (1)
1928	Santa Cruz (1)
1929	Fluminense (1)
1930	Fluminense (2)
1931	Carlos Prates (1)
1932 (AMEG)	Prado Mineiro (1)
1932 (LMDT)	Siderúrgica (1)

=== Primeira Divisão ===
From 1961 to 1968 the second level was called First Division and the first level, Extra Division.

Season	Champions	Runners-up
1961	Itaú (1)	Ferroviário de Divinópolis
1962	Uberlândia (1)	Palmeirense
1963	Nacional de Uberaba (1)	Itaúna
1964	Valerio (1)	Araguari
1965	Formiga (1)	Ferro Brasileiro
1966	Araxá (1)	Usipa
1967	Independente (1)	Alfenense
1968	Vila do Carmo (1)	Trespontano

=== Divisão de Acesso ===
In 1969, the Access Division was the second level, and the First Division was the third.

Season	Champions	Runners-up
1969	Acesita (1)	Cassimiro de Abreu
1969	Flamengo de Varginha (1)	Caldense

=== Primeira Divisão ===
From 1970 to 1976 the second level was not played because "Promotion Law" (Lei do Acesso) had been revoked by CND (National Sports Council). The Promotion Law returned in 1976 and, thus, state championships could again have promotion between divisions.

Season	Champions	Runners-up
1977	Araxá (2)	Fluminense de Araguari
1978	Nacional de Uberaba (2)	Democrata (GV)

=== Segunda Divisão ===
Season	Champions	Runners-up
1981	Democrata (SL) (1)	Alfenense
1982	Nacional de Uberaba (3)	Fluminense de Araguari
1983	Tupi (1)	Alfenense
1984	Fabril (1)	XV de Uberlândia
1985	Esportivo (1)	Caldense
1986	Atlético Três Corações (1)	Rio Branco
1987	Minas Esporte (1)	Sport Juiz de Fora
1988	Flamengo de Varginha (2)	Pouso Alegre
1989	Juventus (1)	Paraisense
1990	Araxá (3)	Patrocinense
1991	Mamoré (1)	URT
1992	Atlético Três Corações (2)	Alfenense
1993	Araguari (1)	Unaí

=== Módulo II ===
Season	Champions	Runners-up
1994	Rio Branco (1)	URT
1995	Villa Nova (1)	Paraisense
1996	Social (1)	Montes Claros
1997	Ipiranga (1)	Nacional de Uberaba
1998	Rio Branco (2)	URT
1999	Uberlândia (2)	Ipatinga
2000	Mamoré (2)	Guarani
2001	Tupi (2)	Nacional de Uberaba
2002	Guarani (1)	Social
2003	Uberaba (1)	Valerio
2004	Ituiutaba (1)	Democrata (SL)
2005	Democrata (GV) (1)	Uberlândia
2006	Rio Branco (3)	Tupi
2007	Social (2)	Uberaba
2008	América (1)	Uberlândia
2009	Ipatinga (1)	Caldense
2010	Guarani (2)	Funorte
2011	Boa Esporte (2)	Nacional (NS)
2012	Araxá (4)	Tombense
2013	URT (1)	Minas Boca
2014	Mamoré (3)	Democrata (GV)
2015	Uberlândia (3)	Tricordiano
2016	Democrata (GV) (2)	América (TO)
2017	Patrocinense (1)	Boa Esporte
2018	Guarani (3)	Tupynambás
2019	Coimbra (1)	Uberlândia
2020	Pouso Alegre (1)	Athletic
2021	Villa Nova (2)	Democrata (GV)
2022	Democrata (SL) (2)	Ipatinga
2023	Itabirito (1)	Uberlândia
2024	Betim (1)	Aymorés
2025	North (1)	URT
2026	Villa Nova (3)	Democrata (SL)

=== Notes ===
- Unaí EC currently disputes the Campeonato Brasiliense, due to proximity of the city of Unaí to the Distrito Federal.
- When promoted to Campeonato Brasileiro Série B in 2011, due to problems with stadium capacity, Ituiutaba EC has moved from Ituiutaba to Varginha, and changed this name to the currently Boa Esporte Clube.

== Titles by team ==
Teams in bold still active.

Rank	Club	Winners	Winning years
1	**Araxá**	4	1966, 1977, 1990, 2012
2	**Guarani**	3	2002, 2010, 2018
2	**Mamoré**	3	1991, 2000, 2014
2	**Nacional de Uberaba**	3	1963, 1978, 1982
2	Rio Branco	3	1994, 1998, 2006
2	**Uberlândia**	3	1962, 1999, 2015
2	**Villa Nova**	3	1995, 2021, 2026
8	**Atlético Três Corações**	2	1986, 1992
8	**Boa Esporte**	2	2004, 2011
8	**Democrata (GV)**	2	2005, 2016
8	**Democrata (SL)**	2	1981, 2022
8	Flamengo de Varginha	2	1969 (shared), 1988
8	Fluminense	2	1929, 1930
8	Ipanema	2	1915, 1920
8	**Social**	2	1996, 2007
8	**Tupi**	2	1983, 2001
17	Acesita	1	1969 (shared)
17	**América**	1	2007
17	**Araguari**	1	1993
17	**Betim**	1	2024
17	Calafate	1	1927
17	Carlos Prates	1	1931
17	**Coimbra**	1	2019
17	Esportivo	1	1985
17	Fabril	1	1984
17	Flamengo	1	1917
17	Formiga	1	1965
17	Guarany	1	1923
17	Independente	1	1967
17	**Ipatinga**	1	2009
17	Ipiranga	1	1997
17	**Itabirito**	1	2023
17	Itaú	1	1961
17	Juventus	1	1989
17	Minas Esporte	1	1987
17	**North**	1	2025
17	Palmeiras	1	1922
17	**Patrocinense**	1	2017
17	**Pouso Alegre**	1	2020
17	Progresso	1	1921
17	Prado Mineiro	1	1932 (AMEG)
17	Santa Cruz	1	1928
17	Siderúrgica	1	1932 (LMDT)
17	**Uberaba**	1	2003
17	**URT**	1	2013
17	Valerio	1	1964
17	Vila do Carmo	1	1968

=== By city ===
City	Championships	Clubs
Belo Horizonte	13	Fluminense (2), Ipanema (2), América (1), Calafate (1), Carlos Prates (1), Flamengo (1), Guarany (1), Palmeiras (1), Progresso (1), Prado Mineiro (1), Santa Cruz (1)
Uberaba	5	Nacional (3), Independente (1), Uberaba (1)
Araxá	4	Araxá (4)
Divinópolis	4	Guarani (3), Juventus (1)
Patos de Minas	4	Mamoré (3), URT (1)
Andradas	3	Rio Branco (3)
Nova Lima	3	Villa Nova (3)
Uberlândia	3	Uberlândia (3)
Varginha	3	Flamengo (2), Boa Esporte (1)
Coronel Fabriciano	2	Social (2)
Governador Valadares	2	Democrata (2)
Juiz de Fora	2	Tupi (2)
Sete Lagoas	2	Democrata (2)
Três Corações	2	Atlético Três Corações (2)
Araguari	1	Araguari (1)
Barbacena	1	Vila do Carmo (1)
Betim	1	Betim (1)
Boa Esperança	1	Minas Esporte (1)
Contagem	1	Coimbra (1)
Formiga	1	Formiga (1)
Ipatinga	1	Ipatinga (1)
Itabira	1	Valerio (1)
Itabirito	1	Itabirito (1)
Itaú de Minas	1	Itaú (1)
Ituiutaba	1	Boa Esporte (1)
Lavras	1	Fabril (1)
Manhuaçu	1	Ipiranga (1)
Montes Claros	1	North (1)
Passos	1	Esportivo (1)
Patrocínio	1	Patrocinense (1)
Pouso Alegre	1	Pouso Alegre (1)
Sabará	1	Siderúrgica (1)
Timóteo	1	Acesita (1)
