= Tupi Football Club =

Brazilian association football club based in Juiz de Fora, Minas Gerais, Brazil

Tupi
- Full name: Tupi Football Club
- Nickname(s): Galo (Rooster); Galo Carijó (Carijó's Rooster)
- Founded: 26 May 1912; 112 years ago
- Ground: Estádio Municipal Radialista Mário Helênio
- Capacity: 31,863
- President: Eloísio Siqueira
- Head coach: Ademir Fonseca
- League: Campeonato Mineiro Segunda Divisão
- 2024: Mineiro Módulo II, 11th of 12 (relegated)
- Website: www.tupifc.com
| Home colors | Away colors |

Tupi Football Club, commonly referred to as Tupi, is a Brazilian professional club based in Juiz de Fora, Minas Gerais founded on 26 May 1912. It competes in the Campeonato Mineiro Segunda Divisão, the third tier of the Minas Gerais state football league.

== History ==
On May 16, 1912, Antônio Maria Júnior, João Baptista Georg and four other people founded Tupi Football Club.

In 2001, Tupi won its first title, which was the Campeonato Mineiro Módulo II, finishing ahead of Nacional de Uberaba in the final stage, which was a group stage competed by six clubs. In 2008, Tupi won the Taça Minas Gerais. In the final, they beat América Futebol Clube (MG) (América Mineiro) in a 4−3 aggregate result.

They won the Série D in 2011, after they beat Santa Cruz in the final.

In 2015 the club finished 3rd in the Campeonato Brasileiro - Série C (third tier), qualifying for the Campeonato Brasileiro - Série B (second tier) in 2016.

== Stadium ==
Tupi's stadium is Estádio Municipal Radialista Mário Helênio, inaugurated in 1988, with a maximum capacity of 35,000 people.

== Honours ==
=== Official tournaments ===
National
| Competitions | Titles | Seasons |
|---|---|---|
| Campeonato Brasileiro Série D | 1 | 2011 |
State
| Competitions | Titles | Seasons |
| Taça Minas Gerais | 1 | 2008 |
| Campeonato Mineiro Módulo II | 2 | 1983, 2001 |

=== Others tournaments ===
==== State ====
- Campeonato Mineiro do Interior (6): 1985, 1987, 2003, 2008, 2012, 2018

==== City ====
- Campeonato Citadino de Juiz de Fora (24): 1921, 1923, 1926, 1929, 1933, 1935, 1936, 1937, 1940, 1941, 1944, 1945, 1947, 1948, 1951, 1952, 1954, 1958, 1963, 1965, 1969, 1976, 1977, 1978
- Torneio Início da Liga de Juiz de Fora (17): 1922, 1924, 1926, 1928, 1933, 1936, 1946, 1947, 1948, 1952, 1953, 1954, 1955, 1957, 1963, 1964, 1967

=== Runners-up ===
- Campeonato Mineiro (1): 1933
- Taça Minas Gerais (1): 2007
- Campeonato Mineiro Módulo II (1): 2006
