= Guarani Esporte Clube (MG) =

Guarani
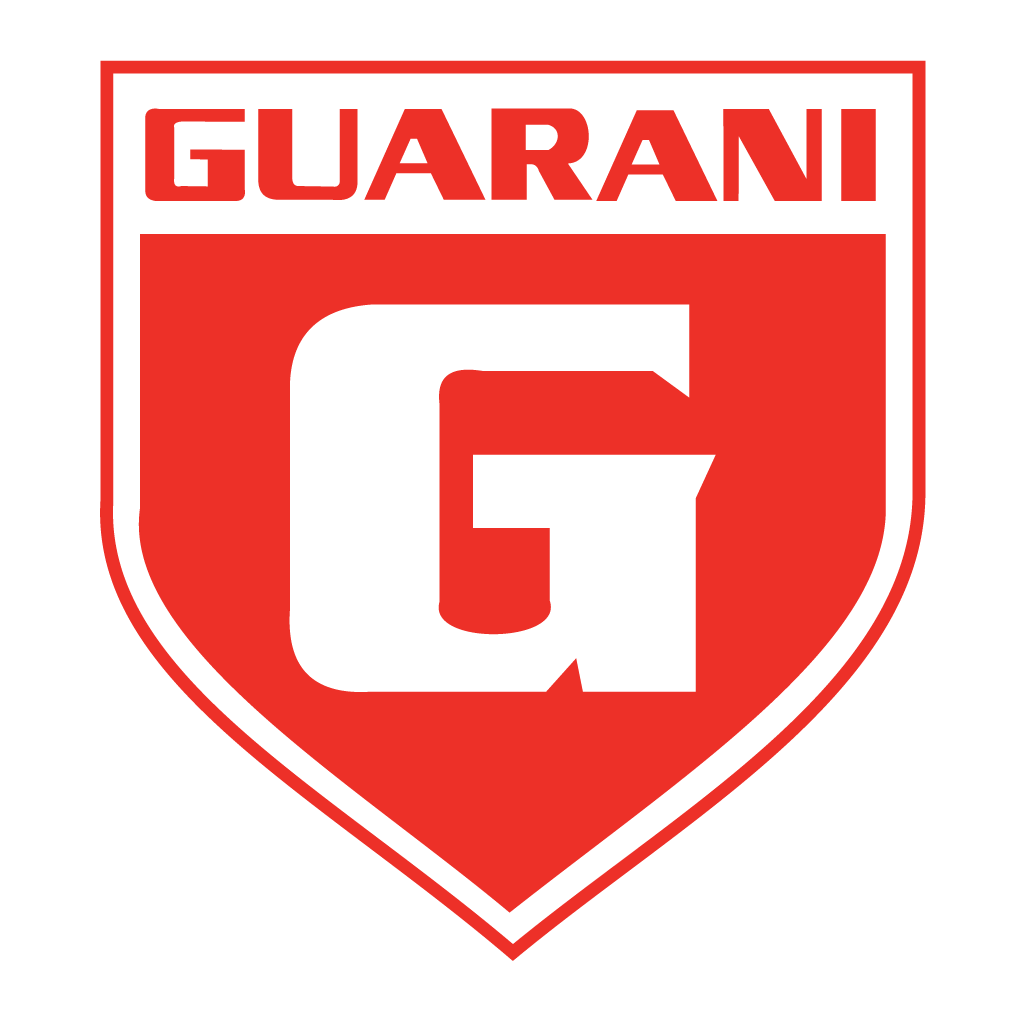
- Full name: Guarani Esporte Clube
- Nickname(s): Bugre; Guará
- Founded: September 20, 1930
- Ground: Estádio Waldemar Teixeira de Faria, Divinópolis, Minas Gerais state, Brazil
- Capacity: 5,000
- President: Vinícius Antônio Morais
- Head Coach: Marco Túlio
- League: Mineiro Segunda Divisão
- 2024: Segunda Divisão, 1st (promoted)
- Website: www.guaranidivinopolis.com.br
Home colours	Away colours

Guarani Esporte Clube, also known as Guarani, is a Brazilian football club based in Divinópolis, Minas Gerais state. It's the most traditional club on the West of Minas Gerais State. Nowadays, the club has been in a renovation time, with the new directorship.

== History ==
The club was founded on September 20, 1930. They won the Campeonato Mineiro Third Level in 1994, and the Campeonato Mineiro Módulo II in 2002, 2010 and in 2018. Guarani had its best performance in National Competitions in 1981, when the club finished Taça de Bronze, now called Campeonato Brasileiro - Série C, in the 4th place.

== Honours ==
=== Official tournaments ===
State
Competitions	Titles	Seasons
Campeonato Mineiro Módulo II	3	2002, 2010, 2018
Campeonato Mineiro Segunda Divisão	2	1994, 2024

=== Others tournaments ===
==== State ====
- Torneio Início do Campeonato Mineiro (1): 1964

=== Runners-up ===
- Campeonato Mineiro Módulo II (1): 2000

== Stadium ==
Guarani Esporte Clube play their home games at Estádio Waldemar Teixeira de Faria, nicknamed Farião. The stadium has a maximum capacity of 4,080 people.
