= Clube Atlético Patrocinense =

Patrocinense
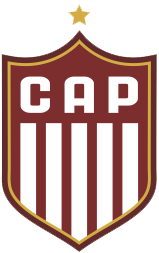
- Full name: Clube Atlético Patrocinense
- Nicknames: CAP; Águia
- Founded: 19 March 1954; 71 years ago
- Ground: Estádio Pedro Alves do Nascimento
- Capacity: 8,500
- League: Campeonato Mineiro Módulo II
- 2025: Mineiro Módulo II, 5th of 12
| Home colors | Away colors |

Clube Atlético Patrocinense, commonly known as Patrocinense, or as CAP, is a Brazilian football club based in Patrocínio, Minas Gerais state.

== History ==
The club was founded on 19 March 1954. CAP won the Campeonato Mineiro Third Level in 2000. Deeply in debt, the club eventually folded, and do not play professional games since 2005 to 2016 when return to the Campeonato Mineiro.

== Honours ==
- Campeonato Mineiro Módulo II
  - Winners (1): 2017
- Campeonato Mineiro Segunda Divisão
  - Winners (1): 2000

== Stadium ==
Clube Atlético Patrocinense played their home games at Estádio Pedro Alves do Nascimento. The stadium has a maximum capacity of 8,500 people.
