= Pouso Alegre Futebol Clube =

Brazilian association football club based in Pouso Alegre, Minas Gerais, Brazil

Pouso Alegre
- Full name: Pouso Alegre Futebol Clube
- Nicknames: Pousão (Big Pouso); Dragão do Mandu (Mandu's Dragon); Dragão das Alterosas (Alterosas' Dragon)
- Founded: 15 November 1913; 112 years ago
- Ground: Manduzão
- Capacity: 26,000
- President: Rogério Paiva
- Head coach: Igor Guerra
- League: Campeonato Brasileiro Série D Campeonato Mineiro
- 2025 2025: Série D, 39th of 64; Mineiro, 10th of 12
- Website: www.pousoalegrefc.com
Home colors	Away colors	Third colors

Pouso Alegre Futebol Clube, commonly referred to as Pouso Alegre, is a Brazilian professional club based in Pouso Alegre, Minas Gerais founded on 15 November 1913. It competes in the Campeonato Brasileiro Série D, the fourth tier of Brazilian football, as well as in the Campeonato Mineiro, the top flight of the Minas Gerais state football league.

== History ==
Founded on 15 November 1913 as Pouso Alegre Football Club, the club only played their first match in 1928. After a period of inactivity, the club became professional in 1967, playing in the Campeonato Mineiro Segunda Divisão but being knocked out after a judicial decision.

In 1983, Pouso Alegre won the Campeonato Mineiro de Futebol Amador, after previously winning the Copa Sul Mineira earlier in the year. In the following season, the club returned to a professional status, and won promotion to the Campeonato Mineiro in 1988 after a court intervention.

In 1990, Pouso Alegre finished fifth in the year's Mineiro, the club's best-ever position in the tournament. Relegated to the Módulo II in 1992, the club played in that division until 1998 when they went into inactivity.

Back in 2009, Pouso Alegre played one season in the Segunda Divisão (third level) before returning to inactivity. The club announced their return to the activities in 2017, and returned to a senior competition in the following year after finishing seventh in the Segunda Divisão.

Pouso Alegre won the Segunda Divisão in 2019, and achieved a second consecutive promotion in 2020 after winning the Módulo II. In the 2021 Campeonato Mineiro, the club finished sixth and assured a place in the 2022 Série D, the club's first-ever national competition.

In the 2022 Série D, the club reached the Finals of the competition, losing to América de Natal. Despite the loss in the final, Pouso Alegre will compete in the 2023 Série C, their first time in the competition.

== Honours ==
=== National ===
- Campeonato Brasileiro Série D
  - Runners-up (1): 2022

=== State ===
- Campeonato Mineiro Módulo II
  - Winners (1): 2020
- Campeonato Mineiro Segunda Divisão
  - Winners (1): 2019
- Campeonato Mineiro do Interior
  - Winners (1): 2026
- Troféu Inconfidência
  - Winners (1): 2021
