= Araxá Esporte Clube =

Association football club in Brazil

Araxá
- Full name: Araxá Esporte Clube
- Nickname(s): Ganso (Goose)
- Founded: 16 November 1958; 66 years ago
- Ground: Fausto Alvim, Araxá, Minas Gerais, Brazil
- Capacity: 5,500
- President: Dailsom Lettieri
- Head coach: Flávio Lopes
- 2021: Mineiro 2ª Divisão, 7th
Home colours	Away colours	Third colours

Araxá Esporte Clube, commonly referred to as Araxá, is a currently inactive Brazilian football club based in Araxá, Minas Gerais. It last played in the Campeonato Mineiro Segunda Divisão, the third tier of the Minas Gerais state football league. Founded in 1958, the club played only once at the nacional level, finishing the 2013 Campeonato Brasileiro Série D in the 38th position.

== History ==
The club was founded on 20 September 1958. Araxá won the Campeonato Mineiro Módulo II in 1966, 1978, 1990 and in 2012, and the Campeonato Mineiro Segunda Divisão in 2007 and in 2011.

== Honours ==
=== State ===
- Campeonato Mineiro Módulo II
  - Winners (4): 1966, 1978, 1990, 2012
- Campeonato Mineiro Segunda Divisão
  - Winners (2): 2007, 2011

=== City ===
- Campeonato Amador de Araxá
  - Winners (2): 1959, 1962

== Stadium ==
Araxá Esporte Clube play their home games at Estádio Municipal Fausto Alvim. The stadium has a maximum capacity of 4,500 people.
