= 2015 Clube Atlético Mineiro season =

Atlético Mineiro
2015 season
- President: Daniel Nepomuceno
- Manager: Levir Culpi
- Stadium: Independência; Mineirão
- Série A: 2nd
- Campeonato Mineiro: Winners
- Copa do Brasil: Round of 16
- Copa Libertadores: Round of 16
- Top goalscorer: League: Lucas Pratto (12); All: Lucas Pratto (21)
- Highest home attendance: 55,987 (vs Joinville, 26 June)
- Lowest home attendance: 5,216 (vs Guarani, 1 March)
- Average home league attendance: 24,930
| Home colours | Away colours | Third colours |

The 2015 season is Clube Atlético Mineiro's 107th in existence and ninth consecutive season in the top-flight of Brazilian football. Along with the Campeonato Brasileiro Série A and the Campeonato Mineiro, the club also competed in the Copa Libertadores and the Copa do Brasil.

On 3 May, Atlético Mineiro won its 43rd Campeonato Mineiro title, defeating Caldense in the finals. On 13 May, the team was eliminated from Copa Libertadores in the round of 16 by Internacional, the same stage it fell in Copa do Brasil to Figueirense on 26 August.

== Season overview ==
=== Background and pre-season ===
The previous season ended with two important events for the club. On 26 November 2014 Atlético won its first Copa do Brasil by beating rivals Cruzeiro in the finals and secured a spot in the 2015 edition of the Copa Libertadores, its third consecutive participation. A change in the club's board also occurred, with successful president Alexandre Kalil's term, which had started in 2008, coming to an end. Daniel Nepomuceno was elected for the office on 3 December 2014.

On 16 December 2014 Atlético announced the signing of Argentine striker Lucas Pratto from Vélez Sarsfield, elected Footballer of the Year of Argentina in the 2014 season. The pre-season, which started on 7 January, also saw the returns of Patric, Giovanni Augusto and Carlos César, previously out on loan. Danilo Pires, previously with Santa Cruz, joined the club on 12 January on loan from Corinthians Alagoano.

Former team captain Réver left the club on 14 January, after 4 and a half years of service, joining fellow Série A side Internacional. That day also saw Nikão, who was previously on loan at Ceará, leave the club and join Atlético Paranaense. Despite training with the squad in the start of the pre-season, Diego Tardelli departed the club, this time joining Chinese side Shandong Luneng on 17 January 2015, for a €5.5 million fee. A number of previously loaned players also returned to the club, only to be loaned again.

The pre-season included a friendly match against Shakhtar Donetsk, part of the Ukrainian club's tour in Brazil, that was played on 21 January and won by Atlético 4–2, with Pratto scoring its first goal for the club. A training match was also played against Minas Boca and ended 3–0.

=== February ===
Campeonato Mineiro went underway on the first day of February and Atlético started the season with a 2–0 home win against Tupi, with goals by Dátolo and Pratto. On 6 February Sherman Cárdenas joined the club from Atlético Nacional, on a season-long loan deal with an option to purchase clause. The state league season seemed promising, with two more victories, 2–0 against Mamoré away and 2–1 over Democrata at home. The unbeaten run would end early, however, with three defeats happening in a single week.

Copa Libertadores didn't start well for Atlético, with the team failing to secure a good result against Colo-Colo in Santiago, with the match ending 2–0 to the Chilean side on 18 February. Things got worse after a 2–1 defeat to rivals América in the Campeonato Mineiro on 22 February, despite Galo scoring first and América having one man sent off. The bad run continued on 25 February, with the season's first home defeat: 0–1 against Mexican club Atlas, for the second round of the Copa Libertadores second stage.

=== March ===
March saw some improvement in the team's form, with a 2–0 victory against Guarani in the state league coming on the first day of the month. On 8 March, Atlético played its first Clássico Mineiro of the season against Cruzeiro away at the Mineirão, which ended 1–1. Caldense managed to defeat Atlético 1–0 and continue their good run in the Campeonato Mineiro on 12 March. Things finally improved in the following game, a 4–0 home win against URT on 15 March, which started a streak of 4 consecutive victories. The second of them happened in the Copa Libertadores, in which the team defeated Santa Fe at El Campín 1–0, the match-winner being a header by Pratto who had returned to the squad after an injury. Two more 3–0 victories in the state league followed, on 22 March against Tombense away, and on 29 March against Villa Nova at home.

=== April ===
The first stage of Campeonato Mineiro ended for Atlético with a 2–0 away defeat to Boa Esporte on 5 April, which meant the team finished on 3rd position and would face rivals Cruzeiro in the semi-finals. On 7 April a new signing was announced, and Thiago Ribeiro joined the club on loan from Santos. The team's comeback on Group 1 of Copa Libertadores seemed to continue with a 2–0 home win against Santa Fe on 9 April, but was interrupted by a 1–0 defeat to Atlas at the Jalisco on 15 April. This meant a 2–0 victory against Colo-Colo was needed in order for the club to qualify for the knockout stage. On 10 April, after falling out of favor with manager Levir Culpi, midfielder Pierre left the club after 4 years, joining Fluminense.

Meanwhile, the two-legged semi-finals against Cruzeiro started on home soil with a 1–1 at Independência on 12 April. The following week, on 19 April, the second leg was played at the Mineirão. Atlético trailed 1–0 in halftime, but two goals by Pratto, both of them assisted by Guilherme, were enough to secure a 2–1 victory and qualification to the finals to face Caldense. The decisive match against Colo-Colo was played on 22 April, and the needed 2–0 result came thanks to a sensational long strike by Rafael Carioca in the last minutes, which meant qualification to the round of 16. The first leg of the Mineiro finals against Caldense was Atlético's first home match of the season at the Mineirão, and ended 0–0 on 26 April.

=== May ===
On 3 May, Campeonato Mineiro came to a conclusion, and Atlético were crowned champions of the competition for the 43rd time after a 2–1 win over Caldense in Varginha, with goals by newcomer Thiago Ribeiro and Jô. Cesinha's loan deal with the club ended and he returned to Bragantino on 5 May. The round of 16 of Copa Libertadores saw Atlético face fellow Brazilian side Internacional, with the first leg being played at the Independência on 6 May, and ending 2–2, with an injury time goal by Leonardo Silva. Centre-back Emerson was loaned to Avaí on 7 May until the end of the season. Atlético debuted in the 2015 Série A against Palmeiras at the Allianz Parque on 9 April, in a game which also ended 2–2, this time thanks to an injury time goal by the opposing team. Atlético's Libertadores campaign ended on 13 May, after a 3–1 defeat to Internacional at the Beira-Rio.

With Campeonato Mineiro finished and out of Copa Libertadores, the club now focused only in the Série A, and had to play its first league home game of the season away from Belo Horizonte, to comply with a ban imposed by the Superior Tribunal de Justiça Desportiva. The match happened on 17 May at the Mané Garrincha, in Brasília, and Atlético defeated Fluminense 4–1. On 24 May the team was defeated 1–0 by Atlético Paranaense in an away match played at the Arena da Baixada, which was followed by a 3–0 home victory over Vasco da Gama. Winger Neto Berola, who had returned in March from a loan spell to Al Wasl, left the club in a new loan deal, this time to Santos on 27 May.

=== June ===
On 3 June Atlético defeated Avaí 4–1 at Florianópolis, the team's third consecutive victory by a 3-goal margin. The club's unbeaten run against rivals Cruzeiro, which had started in 2013 and lasted 11 games, however, came to an end on 6 June, in a 1–3 home defeat, even with Luan scoring the first goal of the game. The derby was followed by a 2–2 tie with Santos also at home on 10 June., the same day in which forward André left the club to join Sport on loan, and Marion, previously loaned to Al Sharjah, left to Joinville. Série A resumed on 20 June, with a 2–0 win over Flamengo at the Maracanã, followed by a 1–0 home victory over Joinville at the Mineirão.

=== July ===
The team kept its good run in the Série A with a 2–0 win against Coritiba at the Independência on 1 July. Atlético returned to the Beira-Rio to face Internacional, this time achieving a 3–1 victory on 5 July, after which the team reached the top of the table. The winning streak went on with a 2–1 victory over then title contenders Sport at the Mineirão, on 8 July, the same day Jô left the club to join Al Shabab, and a 2–0 away win against Ponte Preta at the Moisés Lucarelli on 11 July. The unbeaten run ended on 18 July, when Atlético lost 1–0 to title contenders Corinthians at their Arena. A comeback followed on 25 July, in the form of a 1–0 victory over Figueirense at the Independência, and continued with a 3–1 win against São Paulo at the Mineirão, courtesy of a sensational first-half hat-trick by Pratto on 29 July. Midfielder Maicosuel, who had joined the club in 2014, was loaned out for a year to Al Sharjah on 27 July.

=== August ===
The following month didn't start well for Galo, with a 0–0 away tie with Goiás on 9 July, and a 0–2 home defeat to Grêmio at the Mineirão on 14 July, which meant Corinthians surpassed the team in the league table. The bad run continued with a 2–1 away defeat against Chapecoense at Arena Condá, in a match with questionable refereeing decisions. Atlético debuted in the Copa do Brasil with a 1–1 home draw against Figueirense at the Independência, with a Leonardo Silva equaliser coming at injury time, again. On 20 August, left-back Mansur joined the club on loan from Vitória. The team seemed to get back on track with a 2–1 comeback against Palmeiras for the 19th round of the Série A, thanks to a brace by Pratto in what was the 100th match of the club at the "new" Independência. Guilherme was released by the club on 25 August, eventually joining Antalyaspor. A setback occurred in the second leg of the Copa do Brasil round of 16 against Figueirense, in which despite scoring first, the team allowed a comeback by the opposition in the last minutes and was eliminated from the competition. A 2–1 away Brasileirão victory over Fluminense at the Maracanã followed on 30 August.

=== September ===
2 September saw yet another game with controversial refereeing, in which the team lost by Atlético Paranaense at home 0–1. Atlético then traveled to Rio de Janeiro again, this time to face Vasco da Gama, and won 2–1, which meant all three clubs from the state were defeated at the Maracanã. A home match against Avaí was the next, which the team won 2–0. The second Clássico Mineiro of the Série A season happened on 13 September at the Mineirão with the rivals as the home team, and ended 1–1, as Victor made a mistake in Cruzeiro's goal but ended up saving a penalty in injury time, right after Atlético's equaliser. On 16 September the team visited Santos and had its worst result of the season, being defeated 4–0 at Vila Belmiro. A comeback of sorts came in the following matchday, in which the team defeated interstate rivals Flamengo 4–1 at the Independência, with a fine display by Jesús Dátolo, completing six victories out of six possible against Rio's clubs in the season. One week later, Atlético failed to defeat last-placed Joinville at Arena Joinville, as the match finished 2–2 on 27 September.

=== October ===
October started with another away game, this one a 3–0 victory against Coritiba in Curitiba with a good performance by Pratto, on the third day of the month. After a ten-day break, the club defeated Internacional 2–1 at home on 14 October, with goals by Pratto and Marcos Rocha.

== Kit ==
Supplier: Puma / Sponsors: MRV Engenharia, Vilma Alimentos, Cemil, TIM, Tenco, Supermercados BH

| Home | Away | Third |

== Players ==
=== Squad information ===
Players and squad numbers last updated on 19 September 2015.
Note: Flags indicate national team as has been defined under FIFA eligibility rules. Players may hold more than one non-FIFA nationality.

| Number | Name | Nat. | Position(s) | Date of birth (age) | Signed in | Signed from | Notes |
Goalkeepers
| 1 | Victor | (Brazil) | GK | 21 January 1983 (age 43) | 2012 | (Brazil) Grêmio | Second vice-captain |
| 20 | Giovanni | (Brazil) | GK | 5 February 1987 (age 39) | 2011 | (Brazil) Grêmio Barueri | |
| 34 | Uilson | (Brazil) | GK | 28 April 1994 (age 32) | 2014 | (Brazil) Youth Sector | |
| 33 | Rodolfo | (Brazil) | GK | 12 April 1995 (age 31) | 2015 | (Brazil) Youth Sector | |
Defenders
| 2 | Marcos Rocha | (Brazil) | RB | 11 December 1988 (age 37) | 2008 | (Brazil) Youth Sector | |
| 3 | Leonardo Silva | (Brazil) | CB | 22 June 1979 (age 47) | 2011 | (Brazil) Cruzeiro | Captain |
| 4 | Jemerson | (Brazil) | CB | 24 August 1992 (age 34) | 2013 | (Brazil) Youth Sector | |
| 6 | Douglas Santos | (Brazil) | LB | 22 March 1994 (age 32) | 2014 | (Italy) Udinese | |
| 15 | Edcarlos | (Brazil) | CB | 10 May 1985 (age 41) | 2014 | (South Korea) Seongnam FC | Vice-captain |
| 16 | Pedro Botelho | (Brazil) | LB | 14 December 1989 (age 36) | 2014 | (Brazil) Atlético Paranaense | On loan |
| 18 | Carlos César | (Brazil) | RB | 21 April 1987 (age 39) | 2011 | (Brazil) Boa Esporte | |
| 26 | Tiago | (Brazil) | CB | 17 June 1990 (age 36) | 2014 | (Brazil) Caxias | |
| 29 | Patric | (Brazil) | RB | 25 March 1989 (age 37) | 2011 | (Portugal) Benfica | |
| 31 | Jesiel | (Brazil) | CB | 5 March 1994 (age 32) | 2015 | (Brazil) Youth Sector | |
| 37 | Mansur | (Brazil) | LB | 17 April 1993 (age 33) | 2015 | (Brazil) Vitória | |
| – | Emerson Conceição | (Brazil) | LB | 23 February 1986 (age 40) | 2014 | (France) Rennes | |
Midfielders
| 5 | Rafael Carioca | (Brazil) | DM / CM | 18 June 1989 (age 37) | 2015 | (Russia) Spartak Moscow | |
| 8 | Leandro Donizete | (Brazil) | DM / CM | 18 May 1982 (age 44) | 2006 | (Brazil) Coritiba | Second vice-captain |
| 10 | Jesús Dátolo | (Argentina) | CM / AM | 19 May 1984 (age 42) | 2013 | (Brazil) Internacional | |
| 14 | Giovanni Augusto | (Brazil) | CM / AM | 5 September 1989 (age 37) | 2010 | (Brazil) Youth Sector | |
| 19 | Sherman Cárdenas | (Colombia) | AM | 7 August 1989 (age 37) | 2015 | (Colombia) Atlético Nacional | |
| 23 | Dodô | (Brazil) | AM | 5 September 1994 (age 32) | 2013 | (Brazil) Youth Sector | |
| 25 | Danilo Pires | (Brazil) | DM/CM | 21 March 1992 (age 34) | 2015 | (Brazil) Corinthians Alagoano | On loan |
| 28 | Josué | (Brazil) | DM | 19 July 1979 (age 47) | 2013 | (Germany) Wolfsburg | |
| 30 | Eduardo | (Brazil) | DM / CM | 17 May 1995 (age 31) | 2014 | (Brazil) Guarani | |
| – | Lucas Cândido | (Brazil) | DM LB | 19 January 1986 (age 40) | 2013 | (Brazil) Youth Sector | |
Forwards
| 9 | Lucas Pratto | (Argentina) | ST / CF | 4 June 1988 (age 38) | 2015 | (Argentina) Vélez Sarsfield | |
| 13 | Carlos | (Brazil) | ST / CF / RW | 15 August 1995 (age 31) | 2014 | (Brazil) Youth Sector | |
| 22 | Thiago Ribeiro | (Brazil) | LW / RW | 24 February 1986 (age 40) | 2015 | (Brazil) Santos | On loan |
| 27 | Luan | (Brazil) | LW / RW | 11 August 1990 (age 36) | 2013 | (Brazil) Ponte Preta | |

=== Transfers ===
==== In ====
| Date | Pos. | Player | Age | Moving from | Notes | Source |
|---|---|---|---|---|---|---|
| 7 January 2015 | FW | (Argentina) Lucas Pratto | 26 | (Argentina) Vélez Sarsfield | | |
| 7 January 2015 | DF | (Brazil) Patric | 25 | (Brazil) Sport Recife | Return from loan | |
| 7 January 2015 | MF | (Brazil) Giovanni Augusto | 25 | (Brazil) Figueirense | Return from loan | |
| 7 January 2015 | DF | (Brazil) Carlos César | 27 | (Brazil) Vasco da Gama | Return from loan | |
| 2 June 2015 | FW | (Brazil) Pablo | 22 | (Brazil) Oeste | | |

==== Loans in ====
| Date | Pos. | Player | Age | Loaned from | Notes | Source |
|---|---|---|---|---|---|---|
| 12 January 2015 | MF | (Brazil) Danilo Pires | 22 | (Brazil) Corinthians Alagoano | | |
| 3 February 2015 | MF | (Colombia) Sherman Cárdenas | 25 | (Colombia) Atlético Nacional | | |
| 7 April 2015 | FW | (Brazil) Thiago Ribeiro | 29 | (Brazil) Santos | | |
| 15 August 2015 | DF | (Brazil) Mansur | 22 | (Brazil) Vitória | | |

==== Out ====
| Date | Pos. | Player | Age | Moving to | Notes | Source |
|---|---|---|---|---|---|---|
| 14 January 2015 | DF | (Brazil) Réver | 30 | (Brazil) Internacional | | |
| 15 January 2015 | MF | (Brazil) Nikão | 22 | (Brazil) Atlético Paranaense | | |
| 20 January 2015 | MF | (Brazil) Claudinei | 26 | (Brazil) Avaí | Loan end | |
| 22 January 2015 | FW | (Brazil) Diego Tardelli | 29 | (China) Shandong Luneng | | |
| 14 April 2015 | MF | (Brazil) Pierre | 33 | (Brazil) Fluminense | | |
| 12 May 2015 | FW | (Brazil) Cesinha | 25 | (Brazil) Bragantino | Loan end | |
| 8 July 2015 | FW | (Brazil) Jô | 28 | (United Arab Emirates) Al Shabab | | |
| 25 August 2015 | FW | (Brazil) Guilherme | 26 | (Turkey) Antalyaspor | | |

==== Loans out ====
| Date | Pos. | Player | Age | Loaned to | Notes | Source |
|---|---|---|---|---|---|---|
| 7 January 2015 | DF | (Brazil) Alex Silva | 20 | (Brazil) Sport Recife | | |
| 9 January 2015 | FW | (Brazil) Wescley | 23 | (Brazil) Ceará | | |
| 13 January 2015 | MF | (Brazil) Fillipe Soutto | 23 | (Brazil) Náutico | | |
| 20 January 2015 | MF | (Brazil) Renan Oliveira | 25 | (Brazil) Avaí | | |
| 23 January 2015 | MF | (Brazil) Serginho | 28 | (Brazil) Vasco da Gama | | |
| 8 May 2015 | DF | (Brazil) Emerson | 32 | (Brazil) Avaí | | |
| 27 May 2015 | FW | (Brazil) Neto Berola | 27 | (Brazil) Santos | | |
| 9 June 2015 | MF | (Brazil) Lucas Kattah | 21 | (Brazil) Caldense | | |
| 9 June 2015 | DF | (Brazil) Donato | 21 | (Brazil) Caldense | | |
| 10 June 2015 | FW | (Brazil) André | 24 | (Brazil) Sport Recife | | |
| 10 June 2015 | FW | (Brazil) Marion | 23 | (Brazil) Joinville | | |
| 6 July 2015 | DF | (Brazil) Eron | 23 | (Brazil) Atlético Goianiense | | |
| 27 July 2015 | MF | (Brazil) Maicosuel | 29 | (United Arab Emirates) Al Sharjah | Loan until 2016 | |
| 6 August 2015 | MF | (Brazil) Leleu | 22 | (Brazil) Madureira | | |

== Technical staff ==
| Position | Staff |
|---|---|
| Manager | Levir Culpi |
| Assistant Manager | Luís Matter |
| Technical Supervisor | Carlos Alberto Isidoro |
| Fitness Coach | Rodolfo Mehl |
| Fitness Coach | Luís Otávio Kalil |
| Goalkeeper Coach | Francisco Cersósimo |
| Doctor | Rodrigo Lasmar |
| Doctor | Marcus Vinícius |
| Doctor | Otaviano Oliveira |
| Physical therapist | Rômulo Frank |
| Physical therapist | Guilherme Fialho |
| Physiologist | Roberto Chiari |
| Sports Technology Assistant | Alexandre Ceolin |
| Dentist | Marcelo Lasmar |
| Nutritionist | Evandro Vasconcelos |
| Nutritionist | Natália Carvalho |
| Masseur | Belmiro Oliveira |
| Masseur | Eduardo Vasconcelos |
| Masseur | Hélio Gomes |
| Field Assistant | Rubens Pinheiro |

Last updated: 15 August 2015

Source: Clube Atlético Mineiro

== Competitions ==
=== Overview ===
| Competition | First match | Last match | Starting round | Final position | Record | | | | | | | |
| Competition | First match | Last match | Starting round | Final position | Pld | W | D | L | GF | GA | GD | Win % |
|---|---|---|---|---|---|---|---|---|---|---|---|---|
| Série A | 9 May 2015 | 6 December 2015 | Matchday 1 | Runners-up | 38 | 21 | 6 | 11 | 65 | 47 | +18 | 55.26 |
| Copa do Brasil | 19 August 2015 | 26 August 2015 | Round of 16 | Round of 16 | 2 | 0 | 1 | 1 | 2 | 3 | −1 | 0.00 |
| Campeonato Mineiro | 1 February 2015 | 3 May 2015 | Matchday 1 | Winners | 15 | 9 | 3 | 3 | 25 | 10 | +15 | 60.00 |
| Copa Libertadores | 18 February 2015 | 13 May 2015 | Group stage | Round of 16 | 8 | 3 | 1 | 4 | 8 | 9 | −1 | 37.50 |
| Total | | | | | 63 | 33 | 11 | 19 | 100 | 69 | +31 | 52.38 |

Source: Competitions

=== Pre-season friendly ===
| 21 January 2015 Friendly | Atlético Mineiro (Brazil) | 4–2 | (Ukraine) Shakhtar Donetsk | Belo Horizonte, Brazil |
| 19:30 (UTC−3) | Pratto 17'; Carlos 41'; Leonardo Silva 44'; Dodô 55'; Jemerson (red card) 90' | Report | Douglas Costa (yellow card) 43'; Rakytskiy (yellow card) 50'; Shevchuk (yellow card) 68'; Hladkyy 82'; Fernando 87' | Stadium: Independência; Attendance: 20,794; Referee: Igor Junio Benevenuto |

=== Campeonato Mineiro ===
==== First stage ====
| Pos | Team | Pld | W | D | L | GF | GA | GD | Pts | Qualification or relegation |
|---|---|---|---|---|---|---|---|---|---|---|
| 1 | Caldense (A) | 11 | 7 | 4 | 0 | 16 | 4 | +12 | 25 | Qualification to the knockout stage |
| 2 | Cruzeiro (A) | 11 | 7 | 3 | 1 | 23 | 7 | +16 | 24 | Qualification to the knockout stage |
| 3 | Atlético Mineiro (A) | 11 | 7 | 1 | 3 | 20 | 7 | +13 | 22 | Qualification to the knockout stage |
| 4 | Tombense (A) | 11 | 6 | 2 | 3 | 17 | 14 | +3 | 20 | Qualification to the knockout stage |
| 5 | América Mineiro | 11 | 5 | 5 | 1 | 12 | 7 | +5 | 20 | |

Updated to match(es) played on 5 April 2015. Source:
Rules for classification: 1st points; 2nd wins; 3rd goal difference; 4th goals scored; 5th head-to-head points (only when two teams are tied) 5th less red cards received; 6th less yellow cards received; 7th public draw
(A) Advance to a further round

Win Draw Loss

| 1 February 2015 1 | Atlético Mineiro | 2–0 | Tupi | Belo Horizonte |
| 17:00 (UTC−2) | Dátolo 6' (yellow card) 9'; Pratto 17' | Report | Genalvo (yellow card) 37' | Stadium: Independência; Attendance: 12,402; Referee: Marco Aurelio Ferreira |

| 7 February 2015 2 | Mamoré | 0–2 | Atlético Mineiro | Patos de Minas |
| 17:00 (UTC−2) | Pablo (yellow card) 23' | Report | Jemerson 12'; Luan 19'; Dátolo (yellow card) 24'; Luan (yellow card) 35' | Stadium: Bernardo Rubinger de Queiroz; Attendance: 7,232; Referee: Cleisson Veloso Pereira |

| 14 February 2015 3 | Atlético Mineiro | 2–1 | EC Democrata | Belo Horizonte |
| 19:30 (UTC−2) | Dátolo 9' (yellow card) 38'; Luan 52' | Report | Wanderson (yellow card) 57'; Júlio César Carioca (yellow card) 81'; João Paulo 87' | Stadium: Independência; Attendance: 19,451; Referee: Ronei Cândido Alves |

| 22 February 2015 4 | América Mineiro | 2–1 | Atlético Mineiro | Belo Horizonte |
| 16:00 (UTC−3) | Patrick (yellow card) 12' (yellow-red card) 57'; Bryan (yellow card) 44' (goal) 64'; Mancini 76'; Rodrigo Silva (yellow card) 79'; Thiago Santos (yellow card) 87' | Report | Josué (yellow card) 12'; André (yellow card) 17' (goal) 58'; Tiago Pagnussat (yellow card) 64'; Carlos César (yellow card) 66'; Edcarlos (yellow card) 74'; Emerson Conceição (yellow card) 79' | Stadium: Independência; Attendance: 10,140; Referee: Igor Júnio Benevenuto |

| 1 March 2015 5 | Atlético Mineiro | 2–0 | Guarani (MG) | Belo Horizonte |
| 16:00 (UTC−3) | Lucas Cândido (yellow card) 12' (goal) 67'; Jemerson 35' | Report | | Stadium: Independência; Attendance: 5,216; Referee: Jerferson Antônio da Costa |

| 8 March 2015 6 | Cruzeiro | 1–1 | Atlético Mineiro | Belo Horizonte |
| 16:00 (UTC−3) | Leandro Damião (yellow card) 62' (goal) 82'; Mena (yellow card) 87'; Léo (yellow card) 89' | Report | Rafael Carioca 72'; Leandro Donizete (yellow card) 86' | Stadium: Mineirão; Attendance: 35,390; Referee: Emerson de Almeida Ferreira |

| 12 March 2015 7 | Caldense | 1–0 | Atlético Mineiro | Poços de Caldas |
| 19:30 (UTC−3) | Zambi (yellow card) 41'; Cristiano 78'; Andrezinho (yellow card) 85'; Plínio (red card) 90+4' | Report | Danilo Pires (yellow card) 90+2' | Stadium: Ronaldão; Attendance: 3,669; Referee: Wanderson Alves de Souza |

| 15 March 2015 8 | Atlético Mineiro | 4–0 | URT | Belo Horizonte |
| 16:00 (UTC−3) | Luan 42'; Marcos Rocha 52'; Lucas Pratto 60'; Dudu Pitibul 83' (o.g.) | Report | | Stadium: Independência; Attendance: 7,757; Referee: Jerferson Antônio da Costa |

| 22 March 2015 9 | Tombense | 0–3 | Atlético Mineiro | Ipatinga |
| 16:00 (UTC−3) | | Report | Luan 13', 90+2'; Pratto 23' | Stadium: Ipatingão; Attendance: 8,403; Referee: Cleisson Veloso Pereira |

| 29 March 2015 10 | Atlético Mineiro | 3–0 | Villa Nova | Belo Horizonte |
| 16:00 (UTC−3) | Carlos 42', 70'; Marcos Rocha (yellow card) 48'; Pratto 49'; Rafael Carioca (yellow card) 73'; Leonardo Silva (yellow card) 89' | Report | Dionathan (yellow card) 31'; João Paulo (yellow card) 33' | Stadium: Independência; Attendance: 14,644; Referee: Ronei Cândido Alves |

| 5 April 2015 11 | Boa Esporte | 2–0 | Atlético Mineiro | Varginha |
| 16:00 (UTC−3) | Gilson 5'; Léo Baiano (yellow card) 43'; Hiltinho 56' | Report | Pratto (yellow card) 49'; Dodô (yellow card) 59'; Leandro Donizete (red card) 54'; Luan (yellow card) 86' | Stadium: Melão; Attendance: 6,244; Referee: Wanderson Alves de Souza |

==== Knockout stage ====
===== Semi-finals =====
| 12 April 2015 First leg | Atlético Mineiro | 1–1 | Cruzeiro | Belo Horizonte |
| 16:00 (UTC−3) | Carlos 39' | Report | De Arrascaeta 54' | Stadium: Independência; Attendance: 16,153; Referee: Raphael Claus |

| 19 April 2015; Second leg | Cruzeiro | 1–2 (2–3 agg.) | Atlético Mineiro | Belo Horizonte |
| 16:00 (UTC−3) | De Arrascaeta 11' (yellow card) 27'; Willians (yellow card) 44'; Fabiano (red card) 71' | Report | Victor (yellow card) 22'; Pratto 55', 88'; Douglas Santos (yellow card) 74'; Jemerson (yellow card) 89' | Stadium: Mineirão; Attendance: 40,364; Referee: Héber Lopes (Santa Catarina) |

===== Finals =====
| 26 April 2015 Finals; First leg | Atlético Mineiro | 0–0 | Caldense | Belo Horizonte |
| 16:00 (UTC−3) | Guilherme (yellow card) 21' | Report | Rodrigo (yellow card) 67'; Plínio (yellow card) 71'; Sérgio (yellow card) 88' | Stadium: Mineirão; Attendance: 53,585; Referee: Cleisson Veloso Pereira |

| 3 May 2015 Finals; Second leg | Caldense | 1–2 (1–2 agg.) | Atlético Mineiro | Varginha |
| 16:00 (UTC−3) | Zambi (yellow card) 24'; Paulão (yellow card) 35'; Luiz Eduardo (yellow card) 52' (goal) 59'; Rafael Estevam (yellow card) 68' | Report | Leandro Donizete (yellow card) 24'; Thiago Ribeiro 56' (yellow card) 83'; Luan (yellow card) 58'; Jô 78' | Stadium: Melão; Attendance: 14,715; Referee: Emerson de Almeida Ferreira |

=== Copa Libertadores ===
==== Group stage ====
| Pos | Team | Pld | W | D | L | GF | GA | GD | Pts | Qualification |
|---|---|---|---|---|---|---|---|---|---|---|
| 1 | (Colombia) Santa Fe | 6 | 4 | 0 | 2 | 10 | 5 | +5 | 12 | Advance to final stages |
| 2 | (Brazil) Atlético Mineiro | 6 | 3 | 0 | 3 | 5 | 4 | +1 | 9 | Advance to final stages |
| 3 | (Chile) Colo-Colo | 6 | 3 | 0 | 3 | 8 | 9 | −1 | 9 | |
| 4 | (Mexico) Atlas | 6 | 2 | 0 | 4 | 4 | 9 | −5 | 6 | |

Source: CONMEBOL
Rules for classification: Second stage tiebreakers

Win Draw Loss

| 18 February 2015 1 | Colo-Colo (Chile) | 2–0 | (Brazil) Atlético Mineiro | Santiago, Chile |
| 21:00 (UTC−4) | Flores 39'; Paredes 66' | Report | Leonardo Silva (yellow card) 46'; Rafael Carioca (yellow card) 60'; Jemerson (yellow card) 81' | Stadium: Monumental; Referee: Mauro Vigliano (Argentina) |

| 25 February 2015 2 | Atlético Mineiro (Brazil) | 0–1 | (Mexico) Atlas | Belo Horizonte, Brazil |
| 19:45 (UTC−3) | | Report | Medina (yellow card) 16'; Villar (yellow card) 33'; Suárez 86' | Stadium: Independência; Attendance: 16,331; Referee: Darío Ubriaco (Uruguay) |

| 18 March 2015 3 | Santa Fe (Colombia) | 0–1 | (Brazil) Atlético Mineiro | Bogotá, Colombia |
| 20:00 (UTC−5) | Mosquera (yellow card) 28' | Report | Leandro Donizete (yellow card) 37'; Pratto 58' | Stadium: El Campín; Referee: Néstor Pitana (Argentina) |

| 9 April 2015 4 | Atlético Mineiro (Brazil) | 2–0 | (Colombia) Santa Fe | Belo Horizonte, Brazil |
| 21:45 (UTC−3) | Carlos 12'; Pratto (yellow card) 61'; Leonardo Silva (yellow card) 63'; Guilherme 90' | Report | Morelo (yellow card) 51' | Stadium: Independência; Attendance: 21,237; Referee: Andrés Cunha (Uruguay) |

| 15 April 2015 5 | Atlas (Mexico) | 1–0 | (Brazil) Atlético Mineiro | Guadalajara, Mexico |
| 20:00 (UTC−5) | Álvarez (yellow card) 37'; González 39' | Report | Dátolo (yellow card) 40'; Leandro Donizete (yellow card) 54'; Patric (yellow card) 71' | Stadium: Estadio Jalisco; Referee: Patricio Loustau (Argentina) |

| 22 April 2015 6 | Atlético Mineiro (Brazil) | 2–0 | (Chile) Colo-Colo | Belo Horizonte, Brazil |
| 19:45 (UTC−3) | Pratto 18'; Luan (yellow card) 40'; Jemerson (yellow card) 58'; Rafael Carioca 81'; Guilherme (yellow card) 87' | Report | Pavez (yellow card) 48'; Paredes (yellow card) 61' | Stadium: Independência; Attendance: 21,274; Referee: Carlos Vera (Ecuador) |

==== Knockout stage ====
===== Round of 16 =====
Win Draw Loss

| 6 May 2015 First leg | Atlético Mineiro (Brazil) | 2–2 | (Brazil) Internacional | Belo Horizonte, Brazil |
| 22:00 (UTC−3) | Luan (yellow card) 0'; Douglas Santos 14'; Leonardo Silva (yellow card) 84' (goal) 90+4' | Report | Lisandro López 2' (yellow card) 36'; William (yellow card) 25'; Aránguiz (yellow card) 32'; Valdívia 60'; Alan Costa (yellow card) 90' | Stadium: Independência; Attendance: 19,553; Referee: Wilmar Roldán (Colombia) |

| 13 May 2015 Second leg | Internacional (Brazil) | 3–1 (5–3 agg.) | (Brazil) Atlético Mineiro | Porto Alegre, Brazil |
| 22:00 (UTC−3) | Valdívia 21'; D'Alessandro 45'; Ernando (yellow card) 59'; Lisandro López 80' | Report | Leandro Donizete (yellow card) 9'; Douglas Santos (yellow card) 25'; Luan (yellow card) 49'; Pratto 58'; Giovanni Augusto (yellow card) 83' | Stadium: Beira-Rio; Attendance: 39,123; Referee: Julio Bascuñán (Chile) |

=== Campeonato Brasileiro Série A ===
==== League table ====
| Pos | Team | Pld | W | D | L | GF | GA | GD | Pts | Qualification or relegation |
|---|---|---|---|---|---|---|---|---|---|---|
| 1 | Corinthians (C) | 38 | 24 | 9 | 5 | 71 | 31 | +40 | 81 | 2016 Copa Libertadores second stage (Note: Palmeiras has a berth guaranteed to the second stage as the 2015 Copa do Brasil champions.) |
| 2 | Atlético Mineiro | 38 | 21 | 6 | 11 | 65 | 47 | +18 | 69 | 2016 Copa Libertadores second stage |
| 3 | Grêmio | 38 | 20 | 8 | 10 | 52 | 32 | +20 | 68 | 2016 Copa Libertadores second stage |
| 4 | São Paulo | 38 | 18 | 8 | 12 | 53 | 47 | +6 | 62 | 2016 Copa Libertadores first stage |
| 5 | Internacional | 38 | 17 | 9 | 12 | 39 | 38 | +1 | 60 | 2016 Copa do Brasil round of 16 (Note: Since a Brazilian team didn't win the 2015 Copa Libertadores, an additional berth to the 2016 Copa do Brasil round of 16 will be given to the best team not qualified to the 2016 Copa Libertadores, the fifth-placed Internacional.) |

Source: Soccerway.com
Rules for classification: 1) points; 2) wins; 3) goal difference; 4) goals scored; 5) head-to-head results; 6) least red cards received; 7) least yellow cards received; 8) draw.
(C) Champions

==== Matches ====
Win Draw Loss

| 9 May 2015 1 | Palmeiras | 2–2 | Atlético Mineiro | São Paulo, São Paulo |
| 16:00 (UTC−3) | Gabriel (yellow card) 21'; Robinho (yellow card) 53'; Vitor Hugo 81'; Rafael Marques 90+4' | Report | Jô (yellow card) 22' (goal) 85'; Patric (yellow card) 29' (goal) 52'; Josué (yellow card) 74'; Pedro Botelho (yellow card) 90+4' | Stadium: Allianz Parque; Attendance: 28,781; Referee: Felipe Gomes da Silva (Paraná)) |

| 17 May 2015 2 | Atlético Mineiro | 4–1 | Fluminense | Brasília, Distrito Federal |
| 16:00 (UTC−3) | Jemerson 6', 37'; Carlos (yellow card) 10'; Leonardo Silva (yellow card) 24'; Dátolo 52'; Luan 80' | Report | Edson (yellow card) 4'; Fred 88' | Stadium: Mané Garrincha; Attendance: 11,958; Referee: Anderson Daronco (Rio Grande do Sul)) |

| 24 May 2015 3 | Atlético Paranaense | 1–0 | Atlético Mineiro | Curitiba, Paraná |
| 16:00 (UTC−3) | Douglas Coutinho 39' (yellow card) 39'; Wéverton (yellow card) 45'; Felipe (yellow card) 70'; Otávio (yellow card) 50' | Report | | Stadium: Arena da Baixada; Attendance: 13,510; Referee: Thiago Duarte Peixoto (São Paulo) |

| 31 May 2015 4 | Atlético Mineiro | 3–0 | Vasco da Gama | Belo Horizonte, Minas Gerais |
| 16:00 (UTC−3) | Thiago Ribeiro 11', 44'; Dátolo 19' | Report | Rafael Silva (yellow card) 61'; Rodrigo (yellow card) 77'; Yago (yellow card) 88' | Stadium: Independência; Attendance: 17,958; Referee: Alisson Sidnei Furtado (Tocantins) |

| 3 June 2015 5 | Avaí | 1–4 | Atlético Mineiro | Florianópolis, Santa Catarina |
| 22:00 (UTC−3) | Renan (yellow card) 45'; Anderson Lopes (yellow card) 68'; André Lima 73' | Report | Carlos 13', 77'; Antônio Carlos 23' (o.g.); Leonardo Silva (yellow card) 37'; Rafael Carioca (yellow card) 55'; Pratto 67'; Maicosuel (yellow card) 71' | Stadium: Ressacada; Attendance: 7,101; Referee: Pablo dos Santos Alves (Paraíba) |

| 6 June 2015 6 | Atlético Mineiro | 1–3 | Cruzeiro | Belo Horizonte, Minas Gerais |
| 18:30 (UTC−3) | Luan 13' | Report | Jemerson 45+1' (o.g.); Gabriel Xavier 46'; Marquinhos 71' | Stadium: Independência; Attendance: 20,092; Referee: Marcelo de Lima Henrique (Pernambuco) |

| 10 June 2015 7 | Atlético Mineiro | 2–2 | Santos | Belo Horizonte, Minas Gerais |
| 19:30 (UTC−3) | Werley 27' (o.g.); Dátolo 43'; Guilherme (yellow card) 90+3' | Report | Ricardo Oliveira 18'; Lucas Lima (yellow card) 38'; Werley (yellow card) 44'; Gabriel Barbosa 54'; Gustavo Henrique (yellow card) 64' | Stadium: Independência; Attendance: 10,536; Referee: Wilton Pereira Sampaio (Goiás) |

| 20 June 2015 8 | Flamengo | 0–2 | Atlético Mineiro | Rio de Janeiro, Rio de Janeiro |
| 16:30 (UTC−3) | | Report | Samir 21' (o.g.); Patric (yellow card) 35'; Pratto 40' | Stadium: Maracanã; Attendance: 36,774; Referee: Thiago Duarte Peixoto (São Paulo) |

| 28 June 2015 9 | Atlético Mineiro | 1–0 | Joinville | Belo Horizonte, Minas Gerais |
| 11:00 (UTC−3) | Leonardo Silva 33'; Thiago Ribeiro (yellow card) 45'; Guilherme (yellow card) 81' | Report | Naldo (yellow card) 70' | Stadium: Mineirão; Attendance: 55,987; Referee: Emerson Luiz Sobral (Pernambuco) |

| 1 July 2015 10 | Atlético Mineiro | 2–0 | Coritiba | Belo Horizonte, Minas Gerais |
| 21:00 (UTC−3) | Thiago Ribeiro 45', 67'; Leonardo Silva (yellow card) 50'; Carlos (yellow card) 51'; Douglas Santos (yellow card) 83' | Report | Lúcio Flávio (yellow card) 22'; Thiago Galhardo (yellow card) 37'; Welinton (yellow card) 45'; Alan Santos (yellow card) 45'; Luccas Claro (yellow card) 76' | Stadium: Independência; Attendance: 12,309; Referee: Bráulio da Silva Machado (Santa Catarina) |

| 5 July 2015 11 | Internacional | 1–3 | Atlético Mineiro | Porto Alegre, Rio Grande do Sul |
| 18:30 (UTC−3) | D'Alessandro (yellow card) 41'; Lisandro López 86' | Report | Leandro Donizete (yellow card) 53'; Maicosuel 59', 77'; Carlos César (yellow card) 71'; Thiago Ribeiro 79'; Edcarlos (yellow card) 89' | Stadium: Beira-Rio; Attendance: 16,612; Referee: Raphael Claus (São Paulo) |

| 8 July 2015 12 | Atlético Mineiro | 2–1 | Sport | Belo Horizonte, Minas Gerais |
| 22:00 (UTC−3) | Pratto 47'; Giovanni Augusto 59'; Jemerson (yellow card) 78'; Carlos César (yellow card) 86' | Report | Matheus Ferraz 49'; Rithely (yellow card) 86'; Neto (yellow card) 90+3' | Stadium: Mineirão; Attendance: 50,684; Referee: Elmo Alves Resende Cunha (Goiás) |

| 11 July 2015 13 | Ponte Preta | 0–2 | Atlético Mineiro | Campinas, São Paulo |
| 21:00 (UTC−3) | Biro Biro (yellow card) 77' | Report | Thiago Ribeiro 27'; Giovanni Augusto (yellow card) 53' (goal) 87'; Leandro Donizete (yellow card) 56'; Carlos César (yellow card) 63' | Stadium: Moisés Lucarelli; Attendance: 4,447; Referee: Rodolpho Toski Marques (Paraná) |

| 18 July 2015 14 | Corinthians | 1–0 | Atlético Mineiro | São Paulo, São Paulo |
| 21:00 (UTC−3) | Malcom 41'; Gil (yellow card) 66' | Report | Thiago Ribeiro (yellow card) 58' | Stadium: Arena Corinthians; Attendance: 36,280; Referee: Anderson Daronco (Rio Grande do Sul) |

| 25 July 2015 15 | Atlético Mineiro | 1–0 | Figueirense | Belo Horizonte, Minas Gerais |
| 21:00 (UTC−3) | Rafael Carioca (yellow card) 45'; Pratto 63'; Dátolo (yellow card) 83' | Report | Saimon (yellow card) 14'; Dudu (yellow card) 45+1'; Leandro Silva (yellow card) 47'; Yago (yellow card) 85' | Stadium: Independência; Attendance: 14,951; Referee: Luiz Flávio de Oliveira (São Paulo) |

| 29 July 2015 16 | Atlético Mineiro | 3–1 | São Paulo | Belo Horizonte, Minas Gerais |
| 22:00 (UTC−3) | Pratto 19', 25', 44' | Report | Alexandre Pato 58'; Thiago Mendes (yellow card) 87' | Stadium: Mineirão; Attendance: 45,392; Referee: Dewson Fernando Freitas da Silva (Pará) |

| 9 August 2015 17 | Goiás | 0–0 | Atlético Mineiro | Goiânia, Goiás |
| 16:00 (UTC−3) | Douglas Santos (yellow card) 9'; Marcos Rocha (yellow card) 63' | Report | Gimenez (yellow card) 30'; Fred (yellow card) 40' | Stadium: Serra Dourada; Attendance: 7,026; Referee: Raphael Claus (São Paulo) |

| 13 August 2015 18 | Atlético Mineiro | 0–2 | Grêmio | Belo Horizonte, Minas Gerais |
| 21:00 (UTC−3) | Douglas Santos (yellow card) 74'; Leonardo Silva (yellow card) 84' | Report | Douglas (yellow card) 33' (goal) 40'; Luan (yellow card) 45' (goal) 54'; Marcelo Grohe (yellow card) 70' | Stadium: Mineirão; Attendance: 49,047; Referee: Dewson Fernando Freitas da Silva (Pará) |

| 16 August 2015 19 | Chapecoense | 2–1 | Atlético Mineiro | Chapecó, Santa Catarina |
| 18:30 (UTC−3) | Cléber Santana 40'; Elicarlos (yellow card) 55'; Wagner (yellow card) 69'; Apodi 77'; Dener Assunção (yellow card) 87'; Neto (yellow card) 90+4' | Report | Luan (yellow card) 33'; Leonardo Silva (red card) 37'; Neto 63' (o.g.); Victor (yellow card) 78'; Marcos Rocha (yellow card) 90' | Stadium: Arena Condá; Attendance: 8,133; Referee: Marcos André Gomes da Penha (Espírito Santo) |

| 23 August 2015 20 | Atlético Mineiro | 2–1 | Palmeiras | Belo Horizonte, Minas Gerais |
| 18:30 (UTC−3) | Pratto 17', 36' (pen.); Jemerson (yellow card) 67' | Report | Andrei Girotto 5'; Lucas Marques (yellow card) 35'; Dudu (yellow card) 75'; Gabriel Jesus (yellow card) 90' | Stadium: Independência; Attendance: 17,464; Referee: Sandro Meira Ricci (Santa Catarina) |

| 30 August 2015 21 | Fluminense | 1–2 | Atlético Mineiro | Rio de Janeiro, Rio de Janeiro |
| 16:00 (UTC−3) | Wellington Paulista 46' (yellow card) 51'; Marlon Santos (yellow card) 56'; Cícero (yellow card) 67' | Report | Giovanni Augusto 21'; Pratto (yellow card) 43'; Douglas Santos (yellow card) 58'; Luan (yellow card) 68'; Rafael Carioca (yellow card) 80'; Patric 82' | Stadium: Maracanã; Attendance: 17,186; Referee: Marielson Alves Silva (Bahia) |

| 2 September 2015 22 | Atlético Mineiro | 0–1 | Atlético Paranaense | Belo Horizonte, Minas Gerais |
| 21:00 (UTC−3) | Marcos Rocha (yellow card) 17' (yellow-red card) 45+3'; Luan (yellow card) 44'; Patric (yellow card) 65'; Jemerson (yellow card) 69'; Cárdenas (yellow card) 88' | Report | Wéverton (yellow card) 47'; Walter 57' (pen.); Sidcley (yellow card) 61'; Hernández (yellow card) 66'; Wellington (yellow card) 72' | Stadium: Independência; Attendance: 12,064; Referee: Marcelo de Lima Henrique (Pernambuco) |

| 5 September 2015 23 | Vasco da Gama | 1–2 | Atlético Mineiro | Rio de Janeiro, Rio de Janeiro |
| 19:30 (UTC−3) | Jorge Henrique (yellow card) 46'; Lucas (yellow card) 47'; Rafael Silva (yellow card) 66'; Nenê 73' | Report | Pratto 23'; Dátolo 43' (yellow card) 75'; Cárdenas (yellow card) 85' | Stadium: Maracanã; Attendance: 7,771; Referee: Elmo Cunha (Goiás) |

| 9 September 2015 24 | Atlético Mineiro | 2–0 | Avaí | Belo Horizonte, Minas Gerais |
| 19:30 (UTC−3) | Luan 12'; Leonardo Silva 29' (yellow card) 72'; Thiago Ribeiro (yellow card) 90+1'; Dodô (yellow card) 90+2' | Report | Jeci (yellow card) 28'; Everton Silva (yellow card) 82'; André Lima (yellow card) 84' | Stadium: Independência; Attendance: 10,338; Referee: Luis Rocha (Rio Grande do Sul) |

| 13 September 2015 25 | Cruzeiro | 1–1 | Atlético Mineiro | Belo Horizonte, Minas Gerais |
| 16:00 (UTC−3) | Marcos Rocha (yellow card) 25'; Giovanni Augusto (yellow card) 39'; Leandro Donizete (yellow card) 82'; Josué (yellow card) 86'; Carlos 88'; Jemerson (yellow card) 90' | Report | Willian 37'; Mena (yellow card) 41' (yellow-red card) 51'; Fábio (yellow card) 83'; Fabrício (yellow card) 90+3' | Stadium: Mineirão; Attendance: 45,991; Referee: Leandro Vuaden (Rio Grande do Sul) |

| 16 September 2015 26 | Santos | 4–0 | Atlético Mineiro | Santos, São Paulo |
| 22:00 (UTC−3) | Gabriel Barbosa 37', 54'; Ricardo Oliveira 70'; David Braz (yellow card) 89'; Marquinhos Gabriel 90+1' | Report | Giovanni Augusto (yellow card) 37' | Stadium: Vila Belmiro; Attendance: 6,179; Referee: Héber Lopes (Santa Catarina) |

| 20 September 2015 27 | Atlético Mineiro | 4–1 | Flamengo | Belo Horizonte, Minas Gerais |
| 16:00 (UTC−3) | Victor (yellow card) 8'; Marcelo 15' (o.g.); Jemerson 26', 55'; Luan (yellow card) 63'; Dátolo 70' | Report | Paulinho 18'; Éverton (yellow card) 19'; Canteros (yellow card) 66' | Stadium: Independência; Attendance: 20,203; Referee: Sandro Meira Ricci (Santa Catarina) |

| 27 September 2015 28 | Joinville | 2–2 | Atlético Mineiro | Joinville, Santa Catarina |
| 16:00 (UTC−3) | Bruno Aguiar (yellow card) 17'; Rogério (yellow card) 48'; Kempes 61'; Willian Popp 83' | Report | Jemerson (yellow card) 45+3'; Luan 52'; Thiago Ribeiro 81'; Douglas Santos (yellow card) 84' | Stadium: Arena Joinville; Attendance: 7,486; Referee: Raphael Claus (São Paulo) |

| 4 October 2015 29 | Coritiba | 0–3 | Atlético Mineiro | Curitiba, Paraná |
| 18:30 (UTC−3) | Wilson (yellow card) 84' | Report | Luan (yellow card) 27'; Leandro Silva 41' (o.g.); Giovanni Augusto 65'; Carlos (yellow card) 79'; Pratto 84' (pen.) | Stadium: Couto Pereira; Attendance: 15,569; Referee: Péricles Bassols (Rio de Janeiro) |

| 14 October 2015 30 | Atlético Mineiro | 2–1 | Internacional | Belo Horizonte, Minas Gerais |
| 19:30 (UTC−3) | Leandro Donizete (yellow card) 12'; Pratto 16' (pen.); Marcos Rocha 70'; Luan (yellow card) 86' | Report | Rodrigo Dourado (yellow card) 15'; Paulão 38'; Alex (yellow card) 44'; Vitinho (yellow card) 89' | Stadium: Independência; Attendance: 19,023; Referee: André Luiz de Freitas Castro (Goiás) |

| 18 October 2015 31 | Sport | 4–1 | Atlético Mineiro | Recife, Pernambuco |
| 18:30 (UTC−3) | | | | Stadium: Ilha do Retiro |

| 25 October 2015 32 | Atlético Mineiro | 2–1 | Ponte Preta | Belo Horizonte, Minas Gerais |
| 19:30 (UTC−3) | | | | Stadium: Independência |

| 1 November 2015 33 | Atlético Mineiro | 0–3 | Corinthians | Belo Horizonte, Minas Gerais |
| 17:00 (UTC−3) | | | | Stadium: Independência |

| 8 November 2015 34 | Figueirense | 0–1 | Atlético Mineiro | Florianópolis, Santa Catarina |
| 17:00 (UTC−3) | | | | Stadium: Orlando Scarpelli |

| 19 November 2015 35 | São Paulo | 4−2 | Atlético Mineiro | São Paulo, São Paulo |
| 22:00 (UTC−3) | | | | Stadium: Morumbi |

| 22 November 2015 36 | Atlético Mineiro | 2−2 | Goiás | Belo Horizonte, Minas Gerais |
| 17:00 (UTC−3) | | | | Stadium: Independência |

| 29 November 2015 37 | Grêmio | 2–1 | Atlético Mineiro | Porto Alegre, Rio Grande do Sul |
| 17:00 (UTC−3) | | | | Stadium: Arena do Grêmio |

| 6 December 2015 38 | Atlético Mineiro | 3–0 | Chapecoense | Belo Horizonte, Minas Gerais |
| 17:00 (UTC−3) | | | | Stadium: Mineirão |

=== Copa do Brasil ===
Win Draw Loss

==== Round of 16 ====
| 19 August 2015 First leg | Atlético Mineiro | 1–1 | Figueirense | Belo Horizonte, Minas Gerais |
| 19:30 (UTC−3) | Leandro Donizete (yellow card) 39'; Marcos Rocha (yellow card) 52'; Leonardo Silva 90+3' | Report | Rafael Bastos (yellow card) 44'; Clayton 45+3'; Dener (yellow card) 47'; Yago (yellow card) 85' | Stadium: Independência; Attendance: 16,123; Referee: Rodolpho Toski Marques (Paraná) |

| 26 August 2015 Second leg | Figueirense | 2–1 | Atlético Mineiro | Florianópolis, Santa Catarina |
| 19:30 (UTC−3) | Fabinho (yellow card) 38'; Leandro Silva 72' (yellow card) 78'; Marcão 89'; Alex Muralha (yellow card) 90+1' | Report | Luan (yellow card) 23'; Edcarlos 44' (yellow card) | Stadium: Orlando Scarpelli; Attendance: 7,310; Referee: Vinicius Furlan (São Paulo) |

== Squad statistics ==
=== Player appearances and goals ===
Statistics correct as of 14 October 2015.

^{‡} denotes a player who has left the squad during the season.

| No. | Pos | Nat | Player | Total | | Brasileirão | | Copa do Brasil | | Copa Libertadores | | Campeonato Mineiro | |
| No. | Pos | Nat | Player | Apps | Goals | Apps | Goals | Apps | Goals | Apps | Goals | Apps | Goals |
|---|---|---|---|---|---|---|---|---|---|---|---|---|---|
| 1 | GK | (Brazil) BRA | Victor | 55 | -53 | 30 | −31 | 2 | −3 | 8 | −9 | 15 | −10 |
| 2 | DF | (Brazil) BRA | Marcos Rocha | 28 | 2 | 15 | 1 | 2 | 0 | 3 | 0 | 8 | 1 |
| 3 | DF | (Brazil) BRA | Leonardo Silva | 40 | 2 | 26 | 2 | 2 | 0 | 5 | 0 | 7 | 0 |
| 4 | DF | (Brazil) BRA | Jemerson | 52 | 6 | 28 | 4 | 2 | 0 | 8 | 0 | 14 | 2 |
| 5 | MF | (Brazil) BRA | Rafael Carioca | 51 | 2 | 28 | 0 | 2 | 0 | 8 | 1 | 13 | 1 |
| 5^{‡} | MF | (Brazil) BRA | Pierre | 1 | 0 | 1 | 0 | 0 | 0 | 0 | 0 | 0 | 0 |
| 6 | DF | (Brazil) BRA | Douglas Santos | 42 | 1 | 25 | 0 | 2 | 0 | 6 | 1 | 9 | 0 |
| 7^{‡} | FW | (Brazil) BRA | Jô | 9 | 2 | 3 | 1 | 0 | 0 | 3 | 0 | 3 | 1 |
| 8 | MF | (Brazil) BRA | Leandro Donizete | 43 | 0 | 24 | 0 | 2 | 0 | 7 | 0 | 10 | 0 |
| 9 | FW | (Argentina) ARG | Lucas Pratto | 46 | 21 | 28 | 12 | 2 | 0 | 6 | 3 | 10 | 6 |
| 10 | MF | (Argentina) ARG | Jesús Dátolo | 36 | 7 | 20 | 5 | 2 | 0 | 7 | 0 | 7 | 2 |
| 11^{‡} | MF | (Brazil) BRA | Maicosuel | 25 | 2 | 12 | 2 | 0 | 0 | 5 | 0 | 8 | 0 |
| 13 | FW | (Brazil) BRA | Carlos | 37 | 7 | 18 | 3 | 0 | 0 | 5 | 1 | 14 | 3 |
| 14 | MF | (Brazil) BRA | Giovanni Augusto | 32 | 4 | 27 | 4 | 2 | 0 | 2 | 0 | 1 | 0 |
| 15 | DF | (Brazil) BRA | Edcarlos | 21 | 1 | 6 | 0 | 1 | 1 | 4 | 0 | 10 | 0 |
| 16 | DF | (Brazil) BRA | Pedro Botelho | 11 | 0 | 7 | 0 | 0 | 0 | 1 | 0 | 3 | 0 |
| 17^{‡} | FW | (Brazil) BRA | Guilherme | 17 | 1 | 10 | 0 | 1 | 0 | 3 | 0 | 3 | 1 |
| 18 | DF | (Brazil) BRA | Carlos César | 9 | 0 | 6 | 0 | 1 | 0 | 0 | 0 | 2 | 0 |
| 19 | MF | (Colombia) COL | Sherman Cárdenas | 24 | 0 | 12 | 0 | 0 | 0 | 4 | 0 | 8 | 0 |
| 20^{‡} | FW | (Brazil) BRA | Cesinha | 6 | 0 | 0 | 0 | 0 | 0 | 1 | 0 | 5 | 0 |
| 20 | GK | (Brazil) BRA | Giovanni | 0 | 0 | 0 | 0 | 0 | 0 | 0 | 0 | 0 | 0 |
| 21^{‡} | FW | (Brazil) BRA | André | 2 | 1 | 0 | 0 | 0 | 0 | 1 | 0 | 1 | 1 |
| 22 | FW | (Brazil) BRA | Thiago Ribeiro | 33 | 8 | 27 | 7 | 1 | 0 | 2 | 0 | 3 | 1 |
| 23 | MF | (Brazil) BRA | Dodô | 24 | 0 | 10 | 0 | 0 | 0 | 3 | 0 | 11 | 0 |
| 25 | MF | (Brazil) BRA | Danilo Pires | 10 | 0 | 3 | 0 | 0 | 0 | 3 | 0 | 4 | 0 |
| 26 | DF | (Brazil) BRA | Tiago | 2 | 0 | 1 | 0 | 0 | 0 | 0 | 0 | 1 | 0 |
| 27 | FW | (Brazil) BRA | Luan | 43 | 9 | 19 | 4 | 2 | 0 | 8 | 0 | 14 | 5 |
| 28 | MF | (Brazil) BRA | Josué | 18 | 0 | 12 | 0 | 0 | 0 | 1 | 0 | 5 | 0 |
| 29 | DF | (Brazil) BRA | Patric | 33 | 2 | 18 | 2 | 1 | 0 | 5 | 0 | 9 | 0 |
| 30 | MF | (Brazil) BRA | Eduardo | 4 | 0 | 1 | 0 | 1 | 0 | 1 | 0 | 1 | 0 |
| 31 | DF | (Brazil) BRA | Jesiel | 0 | 0 | 0 | 0 | 0 | 0 | 0 | 0 | 0 | 0 |
| 32 | GK | (Brazil) BRA | Uilson | 0 | 0 | 0 | 0 | 0 | 0 | 0 | 0 | 0 | 0 |
| 33 | GK | (Brazil) BRA | Rodolfo | 0 | 0 | 0 | 0 | 0 | 0 | 0 | 0 | 0 | 0 |
| 37 | DF | (Brazil) BRA | Mansur (footballer) | 1 | 0 | 1 | 0 | 0 | 0 | 0 | 0 | 0 | 0 |
