= Uilson =

Brazilian footballer

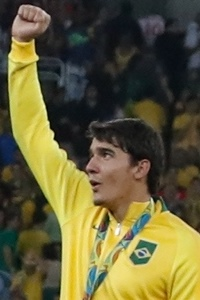
- Uilson with Brazil at the 2016 Summer Olympics

Personal information
- Full name: Uilson Pedruzzi de Oliveira
- Date of birth: 28 April 1994 (age 32)
- Place of birth: Nanuque, Brazil
- Height: 1.86 m (6 ft 1 in)
- Position: Goalkeeper

Youth career
- América Mineiro
- 2005–2014: Atlético Mineiro

Senior career*
Years	Team	Apps	(Gls)
2013–2019	Atlético Mineiro	4	(0)
2020–2021	Coimbra	0	(0)

International career
2011	Brazil U17	2	(0)
2016	Brazil Olympic	1	(0)
Medal record
Olympic Games
Gold medal – first place	2016 Rio de Janeiro	Team
- * Club domestic league appearances and goals as of 8 December 2014

Uilson Pedruzzi de Oliveira (born 28 April 1994), simply known as Uilson, is a Brazilian footballer who last played for Coimbra as a goalkeeper.

== Career ==
Born in Nanuque, Minas Gerais, Uilson joined Atlético Mineiro's youth setup in 2005, aged 11, after a brief stint at neighbouring América Mineiro. He made his professional – and Série A – debut on 25 October 2014, replacing field player Cesinha in a 3–2 home win against Sport Recife, after starter Victor was sent off.

On 7 December Uilson was handed his first start, playing the full 90 minutes in a 0–0 away draw against Botafogo.

He was part of the Brazil Olympic squad that won the gold medal at the 2016 Summer Olympics.

== Career statistics ==
As of 12 July 2018.

Club	Season	League			Cup		Continental		Other		Total	
Club	Season	Division	Apps	Goals	Apps	Goals	Apps	Goals	Apps	Goals	Apps	Goals
Atlético Mineiro	2014	Série A	2	0	–		–		–		2	0
Atlético Mineiro	2016	Série A	2	0	1 (Note: Appearance in Copa do Brasil)	0	1 (Note: Appearance in Copa Libertadores)	0	3 (Note: Appearances in Campeonato Mineiro)	0	7	0
Atlético Mineiro	2017	Série A	–		–		–		2 (Note: One appearance in Campeonato Mineiro, one appearance in Primeira Liga)	0	2	0
Atlético Mineiro	Total		4	0	1	0	1	0	5	0	11	0

== Honours ==
Atlético Mineiro

- Copa do Brasil: 2014
- Campeonato Mineiro: 2015, 2017

Brazil

- Olympic Gold Medal: 2016
