= Giovanni (footballer, born 1987) =

Brazilian footballer

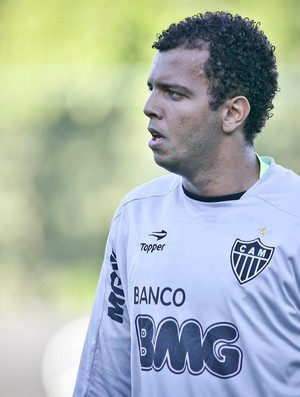
- Giovanni with Atlético Mineiro in 2012

Personal information
- Full name: Giovanni Aparecido Adriano dos Santos
- Date of birth: February 5, 1987 (age 39)
- Place of birth: Bauru, Brazil
- Height: 1.91 m (6 ft 3 in)
- Position: Goalkeeper

Senior career*
Years	Team	Apps	(Gls)
2007–2010	Marília	43	(0)
2009	→ Ponte Preta (loan)	12	(0)
2010	→ Grêmio Prudente (loan)	28	(0)
2011–2018	Atlético Mineiro	76	(0)
2019	Guarani	21	(0)
2019	Paysandu	8	(0)
2020	Água Santa	8	(0)
2020–2022	Novorizontino	53	(0)
- * Club domestic league appearances and goals as of 20:22, 8 August 2020 (UTC)

Giovanni Aparecido Adriano dos Santos (born 5 February 1987), known as Giovanni, is a Brazilian footballer who last played as a goalkeeper for Novorizontino.

== Career ==
Giovanni started in the youth ranks of Marília and became the first team's goalkeeper in 2008. He was lent to Ponte Preta in 2009, where he played in the Série B. In the following year he was lent again, this time to Grêmio Prudente in the Série A.

In 2011 Giovanni was signed by Atlético Mineiro, where he at first served as backup for Renan Ribeiro, but eventually made it into the first squad. He was Atlético's first-choice goalkeeper in the 2012 Campeonato Mineiro, won by the club, but returned to the bench after the arrival of Victor later in the same year.

On 29 June 2018, Giovanni terminated his contract with Atlético after over seven years at the club.

After leaving Atlético, he signed with Guarani FC.

== Career statistics ==
Correct as of 1 December 2014

Club	Season	State League		Brazilian Série A		Copa do Brasil		Continental		Total	
Club	Season	Apps	Goals	Apps	Goals	Apps	Goals	Apps	Goals	Apps	Goals
Ponte Preta	2009	—		12	0	—		—		12	0
Ponte Preta	Total	0	0	12	0	0	0	0	0	12	0
Grêmio Prudente	2010	1	0	25	0	—		2	0	28	0
Grêmio Prudente	Total	1	0	25	0	0	0	2	0	28	0
Atlético Mineiro	2011	1	0	10	0	—		1	0	12	0
Atlético Mineiro	2012	5	0	9	0	3	0	—		17	0
Atlético Mineiro	2013	2	0	10	0	0	0	0	0	12	0
Atlético Mineiro	2014	2	0	5	0	0	0	1	0	8	0
Atlético Mineiro	Total	10	0	34	0	3	0	2	0	49	0
Career total		11	0	71	0	3	0	4	0	89	0

== Honours ==
Atlético Mineiro

- Campeonato Mineiro: 2012, 2013, 2015, 2017
- Copa Libertadores: 2013
- Recopa Sudamericana: 2014
- Copa do Brasil: 2014
