= Leandro Donizete =

Brazilian footballer

Personal information
- Full name: Leandro Donizete Gonçalves da Silva
- Date of birth: 18 May 1982 (age 44)
- Place of birth: Araraquara, Brazil
- Height: 1.75 m (5 ft 9 in)
- Position: Defensive midfielder

Youth career
- Ferroviária

Senior career*
Years	Team	Apps	(Gls)
2003–2007	Ferroviária	87	(4)
2008–2011	Coritiba	100	(0)
2012–2016	Atlético Mineiro	119	(2)
2017–2019	Santos	9	(0)
2018–2019	→ América Mineiro (loan)	26	(0)
- * Club domestic league appearances and goals as of 22 November 2018

Leandro Donizete Gonçalves da Silva (born 18 May 1982) is a former Brazilian footballer who played as a defensive midfielder.

== Club career ==
=== Ferroviária ===
Born in Araraquara, São Paulo, Donizete started his career in hometown club Ferroviária, making his senior debut in 2003. He subsequently became an undisputed starter for the side, helping in their promotion from Campeonato Paulista Série B1 in 2004 and in their Copa Paulista title in 2006.

Donizete left Ferroviária in the end of the 2007 season, with 141 matches and eight goals.

=== Coritiba ===
In January 2008, Donizete signed for Série A club Coritiba. He made his debut for the club on 13 February, starting in a 0–0 Copa do Brasil away draw against Tuna Luso.

Donizete scored his first goal for Coxa on 17 February 2008, netting the game's only in a home success over Cianorte for the Campeonato Paranaense championship. He made his debut in the main category of Brazilian football on 1 June, coming on as a half-time substitute in a 1–1 home draw against Cruzeiro.

Donizete soon established himself as a first-choice, and completed his 100th match for the club on 28 February 2010 in a 4–1 home routing of Nacional-PR. The following 29 January, he signed a new three-year contract.

Donizete's 150th match came on 10 April 2011, in a 1–0 home win against Corinthians-PR.

=== Atlético Mineiro ===
On 14 December 2011, Donizete signed a three-year deal with Atlético Mineiro, also in the first division; Coritiba also retained 70% of his federative rights and Renan Oliveira moved to the opposite direction on loan. He made his debut for the club the following 29 January, starting in a 2–0 Campeonato Mineiro home win against Boa Esporte.

Donizete immediately became a regular starter at Galo, being an important defensive unit during the club's 2013 Copa Libertadores winning campaign. On 9 December 2014, he renewed his contract for two further years.

Donizete scored his first Série A goal on 19 June 2016, netting the first in a 3–0 home win against Ponte Preta; he also assisted Carlos in the last goal. He ended his spell at the club with 231 matches and four goals.

=== Santos ===
On 28 December 2016, Donizete agreed to a three-year contract with fellow top tier club Santos after the expiration of his contract with Atlético. He made his debut for the club on 12 February, starting in the place of injured Renato in a 3–2 Campeonato Paulista away win against Red Bull Brasil.

On 11 April 2018, after being rarely used, Donizete was loaned to fellow top tier club América Mineiro until December. After a knee injury, América decided to renew his loan until the end of his treatment.

== Career statistics ==
As of 4 December 2018

Club	Season	League			State League		Cup		Continental		Other		Total	
Club	Season	Division	Apps	Goals	Apps	Goals	Apps	Goals	Apps	Goals	Apps	Goals	Apps	Goals
Ferroviária	2003	Paulista B1	—		12	0	—		—		—		12	0
Ferroviária	2004	Paulista B1	—		18	1	—		—		—		18	1
Ferroviária	2005	Paulista A3	—		18	0	—		—		16 (Note: All appearance(s) in Copa Paulista)	0	34	0
Ferroviária	2006	Paulista A3	—		18	0	—		—		20	2	38	2
Ferroviária	2007	Paulista A3	—		21	4	1	0	—		12	0	34	4
Ferroviária	Subtotal		—		87	4	1	0	—		48	2	136	6
Coritiba	2008	Série A	18	0	13	1	4	0	—		—		35	1
Coritiba	2009	Série A	34	0	15	0	5	0	1 (Note: All appearance(s) in Copa Sudamericana)	0	—		55	0
Coritiba	2010	Série B	28	0	17	1	4	0	—		—		49	1
Coritiba	2011	Série A	20	0	10	1	9	0	—		—		39	1
Coritiba	Subtotal		100	0	55	3	22	0	1	0	—		178	3
Atlético Mineiro	2012	Série A	30	0	11	0	2	0	—		—		43	0
Atlético Mineiro	2013	Série A	15	0	13	2	—		10 (Note: Appearance(s) Copa Libertadores)	0	2 (Note: Appearance(s) FIFA Club World Cup)	0	40	2
Atlético Mineiro	2014	Série A	22	0	10	0	6	0	7	0	2 (Note: Appearance(s) Recopa Sudamericana)	0	47	0
Atlético Mineiro	2015	Série A	31	0	10	0	2	0	7	0	—		50	0
Atlético Mineiro	2016	Série A	21	2	8	0	6	0	9	0	1 (Note: Appearance(s) in Primeira Liga)	0	45	2
Atlético Mineiro	Subtotal		119	2	52	2	16	0	33	0	5	0	225	4
Santos	2017	Série A	9	0	7	0	2	0	4	0	—		22	0
Santos	2018	Série A	0	0	1	0	—		—		—		1	0
Santos	Subtotal		9	0	8	0	2	0	4	0	—		23	0
América Mineiro (loan)	2018	Série A	26	0	—		2	0	—		—		28	0
Career total			254	2	202	9	43	0	38	0	53	2	590	13

== Honours ==
=== Club ===
Ferroviária

- Copa Paulista: 2006

Coritiba

- Campeonato Brasileiro Série B: 2010
- Campeonato Paranaense: 2008, 2010, 2011

Atlético Mineiro

- Campeonato Mineiro: 2012, 2013, 2015
- Copa Libertadores: 2013
- Recopa Sudamericana: 2014
- Copa do Brasil: 2014

=== Individual ===
- Campeonato Mineiro Team of the year: 2012, 2015
