= André Felipe =

Brazilian footballer (born 1990)

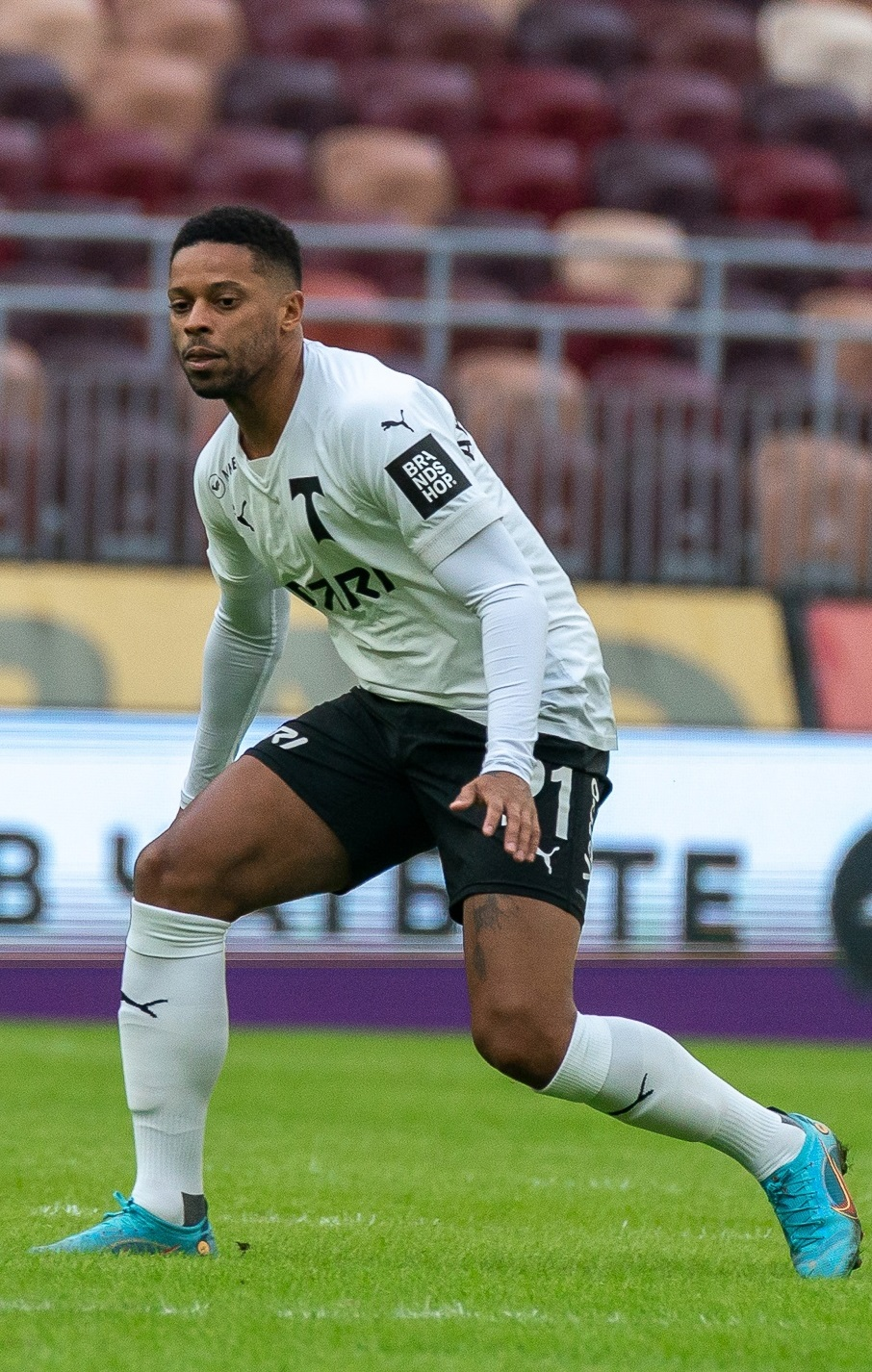
- André Felipe with Torpedo Moscow in 2023

Personal information
- Full name: André Felipe Ribeiro de Souza
- Date of birth: 27 September 1990 (age 36)
- Place of birth: Cabo Frio, Brazil
- Height: 1.84 m (6 ft 0 in)
- Position: Forward

Youth career
- –2008: Cabofriense
- 2008–2009: Santos

Senior career*
Years	Team	Apps	(Gls)
2008	Cabofriense	1	(0)
2009–2010	Santos	40	(20)
2010–2012	Dynamo Kyiv	3	(0)
2011	→ Bordeaux (loan)	8	(0)
2011–2012	→ Atlético Mineiro (loan)	40	(17)
2012–2015	Atlético Mineiro	29	(6)
2012–2013	→ Santos (loan)	39	(13)
2013	→ Vasco da Gama (loan)	27	(12)
2015	→ Sport Recife (loan)	29	(13)
2016	Corinthians	23	(5)
2016–2017	Sporting CP	7	(1)
2017–2018	Sport Recife	48	(19)
2018	→ Grêmio (loan)	24	(4)
2019–2020	Grêmio	28	(4)
2020–2021	Gaziantep	19	(2)
2021	Sport Recife	20	(2)
2022	Cuiabá	22	(4)
2023	Torpedo Moscow	5	(1)
2023	Ponte Preta	10	(1)
2024	America-RJ	10	(5)
2024	Cabofriense	0	(0)
Total		432	(129)

International career
2010–2011	Brazil	4	(0)
- * Club domestic league appearances and goals

André Felipe Ribeiro de Souza, known as André and André Balada in Brazil and as André Felipe in other countries (born 27 September 1990) is a Brazilian former professional footballer who played as a forward.

== Club career ==
André Felipe signed a professional contract with Santos in 2009.

=== Santos ===
André Felipe made a total of 15 appearances in Campeonato Brasileiro Série A during the 2009/2010 season, scoring 7. On 8 May 2010, André scored in the opening game of the Brasileiro versus Botafogo, putting Santos 2–1 ahead in the first half.

André, wearing the number 9 shirt, was an important member of the victorious Santos team which took the 2010 Paulista crown, topping the table for the majority of the season and beating Santo Andre in the well contested final. He was Santos second top scorer during the Paulista season with 13 goals.

=== Dynamo Kyiv ===
On 15 June 2010, the 19-year-old centre forward left FC Santos and joined Ukrainian club Dynamo Kyiv for €8 million. He made his debut for Dynamo Kyiv in a Champions League Playoff Qualifier fir1st leg match against Ajax. André Felipe scored his first goal on 27 October against PFC Sevastopol, in a 2–1 win for Dynamo Kyiv.

=== Bordeaux ===
On 31 January 2011, André Felipe joined Bordeaux on a six-month loan deal with an option for a permanent move.

=== Atlético Mineiro ===
On 19 July 2011, André Felipe was announced as the new reinforcement for Atlético Mineiro. After a bidding war between the club from Minas Gerais and Flamengo, Atletico made the proposal that pleased Dynamo's board the most, when they agreed to buy 20% of the player's pass for €2.2 million. André signed a one-year contract. In his debut, Andrew scored his first goal, against Fluminense. Following the season, the player made good matches, scoring 7 goals and became absolute owner of the team. On 22 April 2012, Atlético Mineiro announced the purchase of the remaining 80% of the economic rights of André, which still belonged to Dynamo Kiev. The transaction counted on help from an investment group, whose name was not revealed by the club. Amounts paid to the Ukrainian team and the time the new contract with Atletico André were not disclosed by the press office of the mining team. André won the State Championship in 2012, earning three individual awards and being the second-highest scorer in the competition. On 18 July 2012, the president Alexandre Kalil, through a statement released on the club's website reported that due to withdrawal of the payment of the remaining economic rights of the group by André DIS / Probe, which had pay from its own resources the rest of the Athletic percentage, thus effecting the outright purchase of the player by Atlético Mineiro.

=== Return to Santos ===
On 9 August 2012, André Felipe returned to Santos, with Peixe buying 25% of his rights in a €2.25 million fee, with a loan contract until December 2013.

In January 2013, after being ten games without scoring and falling in the pecking order, André Felipe was criticized by his manager Muricy Ramalho due to his fitness problems. He then scored two goals against XV de Piracicaba on 24 February and reduced the pressure on him.

=== Corinthians ===
In January 2016, André Felipe signed with Corinthians for an undisclosed fee.

=== Gremio ===
In February 2019, he signed a three-year contract with Grêmio after one on loan with them from Sport Recife.

=== Torpedo Moscow ===
On 23 March 2023, André Felipe signed with Russian Premier League club Torpedo Moscow. He left Torpedo in June 2023.

== International career ==
=== Brazil ===
André Felipe debuted for Brazil in a friendly international against USA on 10 August 2010 at the New Meadowlands Stadium. He has made four appearances scoring no goals so far.

== Career statistics ==
=== Club ===
Appearances and goals by club, season and competition
Club	Season	League			State league		Cup		Continental		Other		Total	
Club	Season	Division	Apps	Goals	Apps	Goals	Apps	Goals	Apps	Goals	Apps	Goals	Apps	Goals
Cabofriense	2008	Carioca	—		1	0	—		—		—		1	0
Santos	2009	Série A	9	2	1	0	0	0	—		—		10	2
Santos	2010	Série A	9	5	21	13	11	8	0	0	—		41	26
Santos	Total		18	7	22	13	11	8	0	0	—		51	28
Dynamo Kyiv	2010–11	Ukrainian Premier League	3	0	—		3	0	3 (Note: Two appearances in UEFA Champions League, one appearance in UEFA Europa League)	0	—		9	0
Bordeaux (loan)	2010–11	Ligue 1	8	0	—		—		—		—		8	0
Atlético Mineiro	2011	Série A	22	7	—		0	0	1 (Note: Appearance(s) in Copa Sudamericana)	0	—		23	7
Atlético Mineiro	2012	Série A	6	0	14	10	4	0	—		—		24	10
Atlético Mineiro	2014	Série A	20	3	6	2	2	0	0	0	1 (Note: Appearance(s) in Recopa Sudamericana)	0	29	5
Atlético Mineiro	2015	Série A	0	0	1	1	0	0	1 (Note: Appearance(s) in Copa Libertadores)	0	—		2	1
Atlético Mineiro	Total		48	10	21	13	6	0	2	0	1	0	78	23
Santos (loan)	2012	Série A	19	7	—		—		—		2	0	21	7
Santos (loan)	2013	Série A	0	0	20	6	2	0	0	0	—		22	6
Santos (loan)	Total		19	7	20	6	2	0	0	0	2	0	43	13
Vasco da Gama (loan)	2013	Série A	27	12	—		—		—		—		27	12
Sport Recife (loan)	2015	Série A	29	13	—		1	0	4	1	—		34	14
Corinthians	2016	Série A	11	1	12	4	0	0	6	1	—		29	6
Sporting CP	2016–17	Primeira Liga	7	1	—		2	2	3 (Note: Appearance(s) in UEFA Europa League)	0	2 (Note: Appearance(s) in Taça da Liga)	0	14	3
Sport Recife	2017	Série A	35	16	9	1	6	2	7	4	10 (Note: Appearance(s) in Copa do Nordeste)	4	67	27
Sport Recife	2018	Série A	0	0	4	2	0	0	0	0	0	0	4	2
Sport Recife	Total		35	16	13	3	6	2	7	4	10	4	71	29
Grêmio	2018	Série A	24	4	—		3	0	2	0	—		29	4
Grêmio	2019	Série A	17	2	11	2	5	1	12	2	—		45	7
Grêmio	2020	Série A	0	0	0	0	0	0	0	0	—		0	0
Grêmio	Total		41	6	11	2	8	1	14	2	—		74	11
Gaziantep	2020–21	Süper Lig	19	2	—		3	1	—		—		22	3
Sport Recife	2021	Série A	20	2	—		0	0	—		—		20	2
Cuiabá	2022	Série A	17	3	5	1	2	0	2	0	—		26	4
Torpedo Moscow	2022–23	Russian Premier League	5	1	—		—		—		—		5	1
Ponte Preta	2023	Série B	10	1	—		—		—		—		10	1
America-RJ	2024	Carioca Série A2	—		10	5	—		—		—		10	5
Cabofriense	2024	Carioca Série A2	—		—		—		—		4 (Note: Appearance(s) in Copa Rio)	0	4	0
Career total			317	82	115	47	44	14	41	8	19	4	536	155

=== International ===
As of 10 November 2021.

Appearances and goals by national team and year
National team	Year	Apps	Goals
Brazil	2010	3	0
Brazil	2011	1	0
Total		4	0

== Honours ==
Santos

- Campeonato Paulista: 2010
- Copa do Brasil: 2010
- Recopa Sudamericana: 2012

Atlético Mineiro

- Campeonato Mineiro: 2012, 2015
- Recopa Sudamericana: 2014
- Copa do Brasil: 2014

Grêmio

- Recopa Gaúcha: 2019
- Campeonato Gaúcho: 2019

Cuiabá

- Campeonato Mato-Grossense: 2022
