= Douglas Santos (footballer, born 1994) =

Brazilian footballer (born 1994)

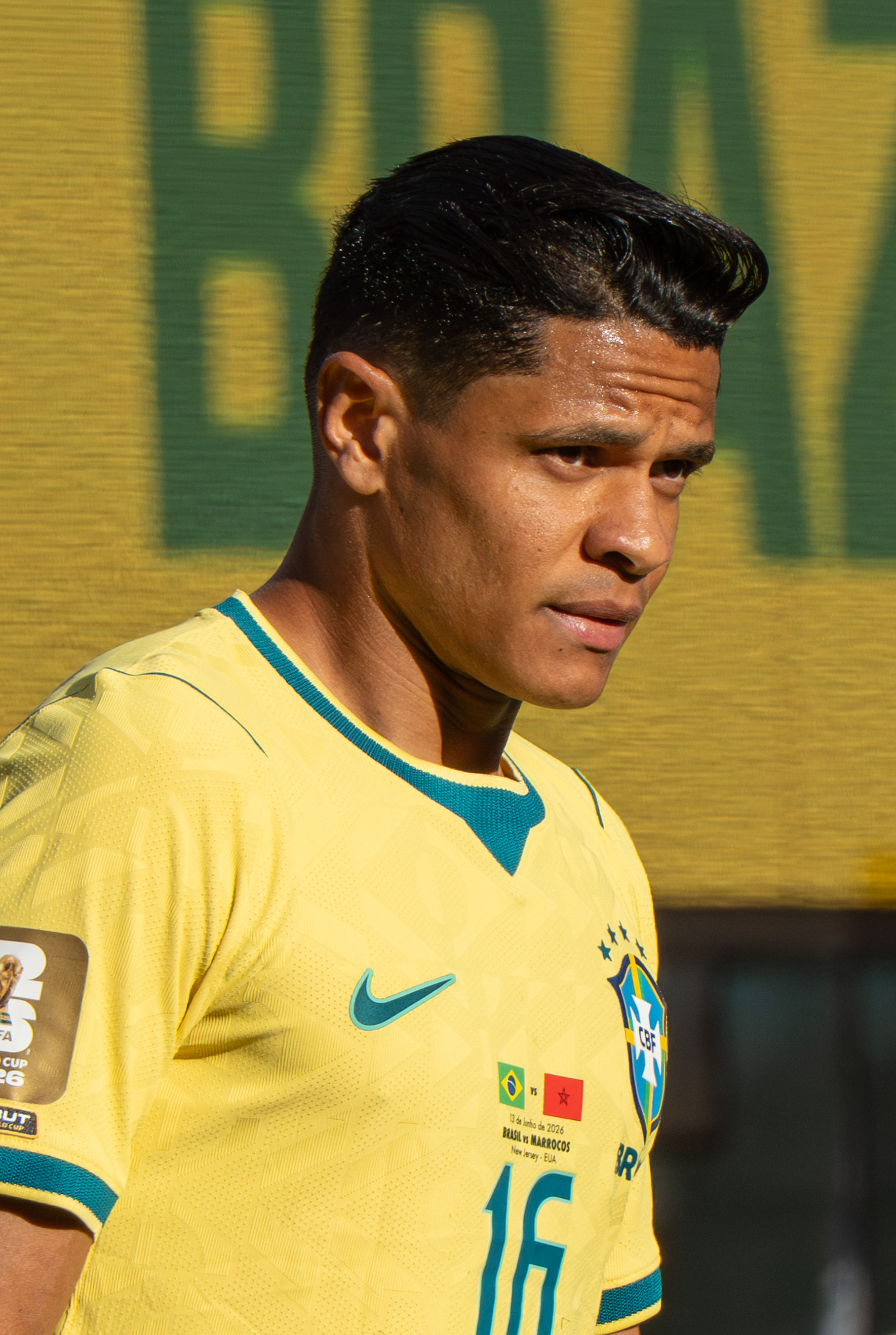
- Douglas Santos with Brazil in 2026

Personal information
- Full name: Douglas dos Santos Justino de Melo
- Date of birth: 22 March 1994 (age 32)
- Place of birth: João Pessoa, Paraíba, Brazil
- Height: 1.75 m (5 ft 9 in)
- Position: Left-back

Team information
- Current team: Zenit Saint Petersburg
- Number: 3

Youth career
- 2009–2012: Náutico

Senior career*
Years	Team	Apps	(Gls)
2012–2013	Náutico	37	(3)
2013–2014	Granada	0	(0)
2013–2014	→ Udinese (loan)	3	(0)
2014–2015	Udinese	0	(0)
2014–2015	→ Atlético Mineiro (loan)	33	(1)
2015–2016	Atlético Mineiro	40	(1)
2016–2019	Hamburger SV	80	(2)
2019–	Zenit Saint Petersburg	201	(8)

International career^{‡}
2013–2014	Brazil U20	10	(0)
2015–2016	Brazil U23	10	(0)
2016–	Brazil	15	(0)
Medal record
Olympic Games
Gold medal – first place	2016	Team
- * Club domestic league appearances and goals as of 8 November 2026 ‡ National team caps and goals as of 17 November 2026

Douglas dos Santos Justino de Melo (Russian: Дуглас До Сантос Жустино Де Мело; born 22 March 1994), known as Douglas Santos or simply Douglas (Brazilian Portuguese: [ˈdowɡlɐs ˈsɐ̃tus]), is a Brazilian professional footballer who plays as a left-back for Russian Premier League club Zenit Saint Petersburg, which he captains, and the Brazil national team.

== Club career ==
=== Náutico ===
On 15 February 2012, Douglas Santos made his first team debut, in a 2–0 home win over Central. On the 26th, he scored his first professional goal, the second of a 3–1 home win over Belo Jardim.

On 18 July, he made his Série A debut, in a 3–0 home win over Ponte Preta. On 10 October, he scored his first top flight goal, in a 1–2 away defeat against Ponte Preta.

=== Granada and Udinese ===
On 12 July 2013, Douglas Santos signed a five-year deal with La Liga side Granada CF, for an undisclosed fee. On 2 September, he joined Udinese Calcio in a season-long loan deal.

=== Atlético Mineiro ===
On 12 August 2014, Douglas Santos was loaned to Atlético Mineiro for 12 months.

On 20 July 2015, Galo signed Douglas Santos permanently for €3 million on a four-year contract.

=== Hamburger SV ===
On 31 August 2016, Douglas Santos signed for German club Hamburger SV.

=== Zenit Saint Petersburg ===
On 4 July 2019, Douglas Santos joined Russian Premier League side FC Zenit Saint Petersburg, signing a five-year contract. On 3 September 2021, he extended his Zenit contract until the end of the 2025–26 season. On 25 July 2024, he extended it for the 2026–27 season, with an option for 2027–28.

== International career ==
=== Brazil (2013–2016) ===
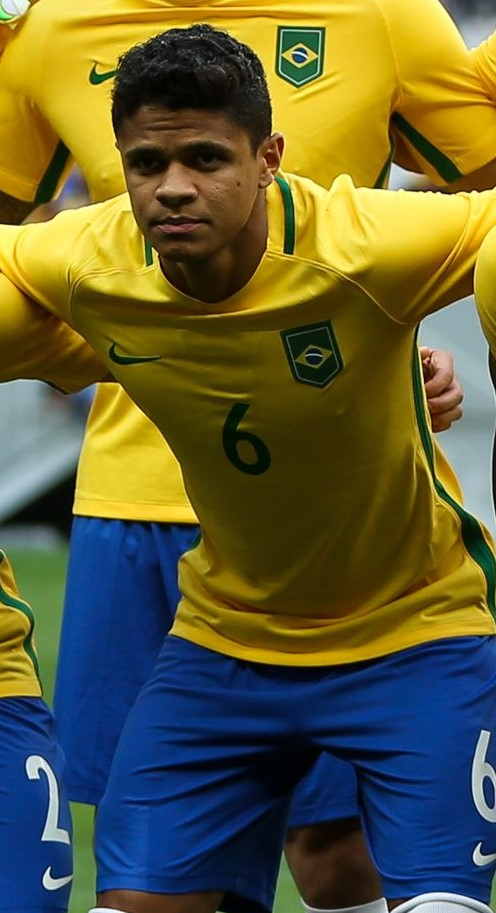
Douglas Santos with the Brazil Olympic team in 2016

A few months before featuring with the U-20's winning squad in the 2013 Toulon Tournament, Douglas Santos received a call-up for the full squad on 2 April 2013, for a match against Bolivia. However, he did not leave the bench.

On 13 August 2015, Douglas Santos returned to the senior team, for friendlies against Costa Rica and the United States.

He also represented Brazil at the Rio Olympics winning the Olympic men's football tournament, and at the Copa América Centenario in 2016, early on the same summer international window.

=== Russia (2025) ===
On 3 March 2025, Santos switched his allegiance to Russia and received a call-up for the friendly match against Zambia, despite the fact that three days earlier he had been on the prelist of Brazil for the 2026 FIFA World Cup qualification matches against Colombia and Argentina.

=== Return to Brazil (2025–present) ===
On 31 August 2025, Santos' request to change sports citizenship from Russian to Brazilian was approved by FIFA, following his call up to the Brazil national team for the 2026 FIFA World Cup qualification matches Chile and Bolivia in September 2025.

== Personal life ==
On 21 October 2024, after five years at Zenit, Santos acquired Russian citizenship.

== Career statistics ==
=== Club ===
As of match played 8 November 2026

Appearances and goals by club, season and competition
Club	Season	League			National cup (Note: Includes Copa do Brasil, DFB-Pokal, Russian Cup)		Continental		State league (Note: Includes Campeonato Pernambucano, Campeonato Mineiro)		Other		Total	
Club	Season	Division	Apps	Goals	Apps	Goals	Apps	Goals	Apps	Goals	Apps	Goals	Apps	Goals
Náutico	2012	Série A	22	1	—		—		3	1	—		25	2
Náutico	2013	Série A	—		2	0	—		12	1	—		14	1
Náutico	Total		22	1	2	0	—		15	2	—		39	3
Udinese (loan)	2013–14	Serie A	3	0	—		—		—		—		3	0
Atlético Mineiro (Note: On loan from Udinese between 12 August 2014 and 20 July 2015)	2014	Série A	13	1	6	0	—		—		—		19	1
Atlético Mineiro	2015	Série A	31	0	2	0	6 (Note: Appearances in Copa Libertadores)	1	9	0	—		48	1
Atlético Mineiro	2016	Série A	10	0	1	0	10	0	10	1	1 (Note: Appearance in Primeira Liga)	0	32	1
Atlético Mineiro	Total		54	1	9	0	16	1	19	1	1	0	99	3
Hamburger SV	2016–17	Bundesliga	20	0	2	0	—		—		—		22	0
Hamburger SV	2017–18	Bundesliga	27	1	1	0	—		—		—		28	1
Hamburger SV	2018–19	2. Bundesliga	33	1	5	1	—		—		—		38	2
Hamburger SV	Total		80	2	8	1	—		—		—		88	3
Zenit Saint Petersburg	2019–20	Russian Premier League	28	0	4	0	6 (Note: Appearances in UEFA Champions League)	0	—		—		38	0
Zenit Saint Petersburg	2020–21	Russian Premier League	28	3	0	0	5	0	—		1 (Note: Appearance in Russian Super Cup)	0	34	3
Zenit Saint Petersburg	2021–22	Russian Premier League	27	0	2	1	7 (Note: Five appearances in UEFA Champions League, two appearances in UEFA Europa League)	0	—		1	0	37	1
Zenit Saint Petersburg	2022–23	Russian Premier League	28	0	5	0	—		—		1	0	34	0
Zenit Saint Petersburg	2023–24	Russian Premier League	26	3	9	0	—		—		1	0	36	3
Zenit Saint Petersburg	2024–25	Russian Premier League	30	0	7	0	—		—		1	0	38	0
Zenit Saint Petersburg	2025–26	Russian Premier League	23	1	2	1	—		—		—		25	2
Zenit Saint Petersburg	2026–27	Russian Premier League	11	1	5	0	—		—		—		16	1
Zenit Saint Petersburg	Total		201	8	34	2	18	0	—		5	0	258	10
Career total			360	12	53	3	34	1	34	3	6	0	487	19

=== International ===
As of match played 17 November 2026

Appearances and goals by national team and year
National team	Year	Apps	Goals
Brazil	2016	1	0
Brazil	2025	2	0
Brazil	2026	12	0
Total		15	0

== Honours ==
Atlético Mineiro

- Copa do Brasil: 2014
- Campeonato Mineiro: 2015

Zenit Saint Petersburg

- Russian Premier League: 2019–20, 2020–21, 2021–22, 2022–23, 2023–24, 2025–26
- Russian Cup: 2019–20, 2023–24
- Russian Super Cup: 2020, 2021, 2022, 2023, 2024

Brazil

- Olympic Gold Medal: 2016

Brazil U20

- Toulon Tournament: 2013, 2014
- Valais Youth Cup: 2013

Individual

- Best Left-back in Brazil: 2015
- Campeonato Brasileiro Série A Team of the Year: 2015
- Russian Premier League Top assist provider: 2020–21
- Russian Premier League Left-back of the Season: 2020–21, 2021–22
- Russian Premier League Defender of the Season: 2022–23, 2023–24.
- Russian Premier League Team of the Season: 2022–23
