= Poços de Caldas Futebol Clube =

Poços de Caldas
- Full name: Poços de Caldas Futebol Clube
- Nickname(s): Vulcão; Laranja Mecânica
- Founded: 1 June 2007; 17 years ago
- Ground: Ronaldão, Poços de Caldas, Minas Gerais state, Brazil
- Capacity: 14,000
Home colors	Away colors

Poços de Caldas Futebol Clube, commonly known as Poços de Caldas, is a Brazilian football club based in Poços de Caldas, Minas Gerais state.

== History ==
Employees of Palace Hotel founded in 1934 a club named Palace Futebol Clube, renaming it to Poços de Caldas Futebol Clube a few years later. However, the club eventually folded. The club was founded again on June 1, 2007. In 2013, the club bankrupted and announced its shutdown from official competitions, few days after its first official game of the year. It was the club's last game, a defeat against Social, for 4–1.

In September 2020, Poços de Caldas returned to an active status.

== Stadium ==
Poços de Caldas Futebol Clube played their home games at Estádio Dr. Ronaldo Junqueira, nicknamed Ronaldão. The stadium has a maximum capacity of 14,000 people.
