= Genalvo =

Brazilian footballer (born 1982)

Personal information
- Full name: Genalvo da Silva Oliveira
- Date of birth: 5 January 1982 (age 44)
- Place of birth: Itabuna, Brazil
- Height: 1.74 m (5 ft 9 in)
- Position: Midfielder

Team information
- Current team: Tupi

Youth career
- Atlético Mineiro

Senior career*
Years	Team	Apps	(Gls)
2002–2005	Atlético Mineiro	31	(0)
2004	→ Criciúma (loan)	15	(1)
2005–2006	Nacional	2	(0)
2007	Ipatinga FC		
2007–2008	Santa Cruz	10	(0)
2008	Caldense		
2009–2012	Ljungskile SK	106	(3)
2013–	Tupi		
- * Club domestic league appearances and goals as of 5 June 2013

Genalvo da Silva Oliveira (born 5 January 1982) is a Brazilian footballer who plays for Tupi as a midfielder.
