= Luan (footballer, born 1990) =

Brazilian footballer

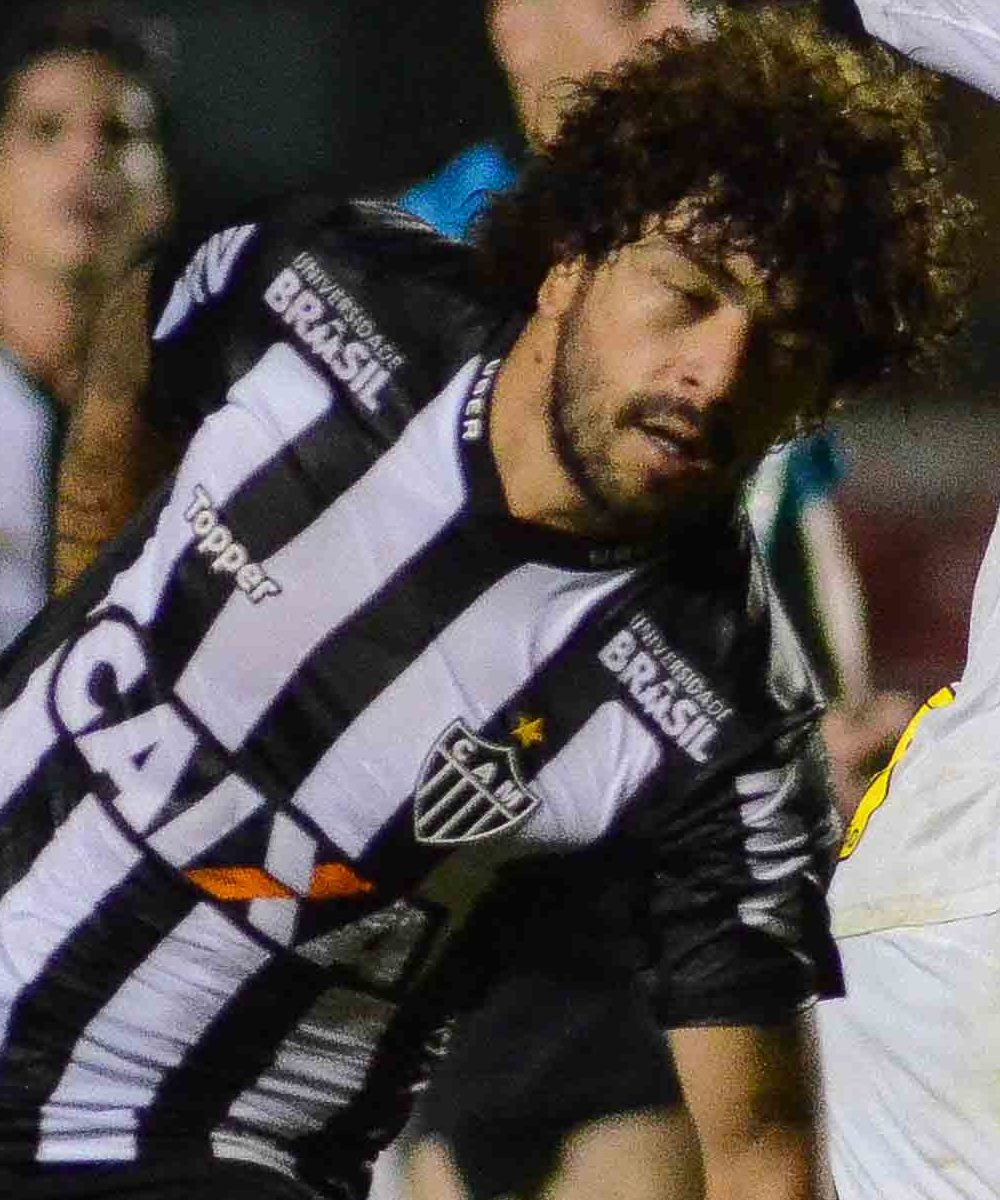
- Luan with Atlètico Mineiro in 2018

Personal information
- Full name: Luan Madson Gedeão de Paiva
- Date of birth: 11 August 1990 (age 36)
- Place of birth: São Miguel dos Campos, Brazil
- Height: 1.70 m (5 ft 7 in)
- Position: Forward

Youth career
- Atlético Sorocaba

Senior career*
Years	Team	Apps	(Gls)
2008–2012	Atlético Sorocaba	79	(35)
2012	→ Ponte Preta (loan)	17	(2)
2013–2019	Atlético Mineiro	171	(24)
2020–2021	V-Varen Nagasaki	47	(7)
2022	Goiás	2	(0)
- * Club domestic league appearances and goals as of 30 April 2022

Luan Madson Gedeão de Paiva (born 11 August 1990), simply known as Luan, is a Brazilian professional footballer who plays as a forward.

== Club career ==
=== Early career ===
Born in São Miguel dos Campos, Alagoas, Luan graduated from Atlético Sorocaba's youth setup, and made his senior debuts in 2008, as his side was crowned champions of Copa Paulista. During his spell at the club he was also the top scorer of both 2011 and 2012 Campeonato Paulista Série A2 campaigns, scoring 25 goals combined.

In July 2011 Luan was a part of Comercial de Ribeirão Preto squad for the club's tour in Europe. He impressed during his time, and was offered a trial at FC Basel; however, the latter and Atlético Sorocaba failed to reach an agreement, and he returned to Brazil. On 1 June 2012 he was loaned to Ponte Preta until December.

Luan made his Ponte – and Série A – debut on 8 July 2013, coming on as a late substitute in a 1–0 home win against Palmeiras. He scored his first professional goal on 14 October, netting the first of a 1–2 away loss against Fluminense.

=== Atlético Mineiro ===
On 4 December 2012, the Campinas club bought 40% of Luan's rights from Atlético Sorocaba, for R$ 1.2 million. Four days later, however, he signed a four-year deal with Atlético Mineiro.

Luan became an important figure for Galo after Bernard's departure to FC Shakhtar Donetsk, appearing regularly. He was an important offensive unit for the club during the 2013 Copa Libertadores championship, used mainly as a substitute.

After contributing with seven goals in the 2015 Campeonato Brasileiro Série A, Luan struggled severely with injuries in the following two years. During the 2018 and 2019 campaigns, he was again a regular starter.

=== V-Varen Nagasaki ===
On 18 December 2019, Atlético confirmed the transfer of Luan to Japanese club V-Varen Nagasaki, for a rumoured fee of US$ 1.5 million. A regular starter in his first season, he scored seven goals in 31 league appearances as his side suffered relegation.

In the 2021 J2 League, Luan featured sparingly as the club missed out promotion.

=== Goiás ===
On 10 February 2022, free agent Luan returned to his home country and signed for Goiás in the top tier.

== Career statistics ==
As of 30 April 2022

Club	Season	League			State League		Cup		Continental		Other		Total	
Club	Season	Division	Apps	Goals	Apps	Goals	Apps	Goals	Apps	Goals	Apps	Goals	Apps	Goals
Atlético Sorocaba	2008	Paulista A2	—		0	0	—		—		20 (Note: Appearance(s) in Copa Paulista)	2	20	2
Atlético Sorocaba	2009	Paulista A2	—		19	6	2	0	—		12	2	33	8
Atlético Sorocaba	2010	Paulista A2	—		13	4	—		—		18	5	31	9
Atlético Sorocaba	2011	Paulista A2	—		23	12	—		—		—		23	12
Atlético Sorocaba	2012	Paulista A2	—		24	13	—		—		—		24	13
Atlético Sorocaba	Total		—		79	35	2	0	—		50	9	131	44
Ponte Preta	2012	Série A	17	2	—		0	0	—		—		17	2
Atlético Mineiro	2013	Série A	35	3	12	4	2	0	12 (Note: Appearance(s) in Copa Libertadores)	2	2 (Note: Appearance(s) in FIFA Club World Cup)	1	63	10
Atlético Mineiro	2014	Série A	20	5	0	0	8	5	—		1 (Note: Appearance(s) in Recopa Sudamericana)	0	29	10
Atlético Mineiro	2015	Série A	26	7	14	5	2	0	8	0	—		50	12
Atlético Mineiro	2016	Série A	8	1	5	3	3	0	5	0	1 (Note: Appearance(s) in Primeira Liga)	0	22	4
Atlético Mineiro	2017	Série A	18	1	4	1	2	0	2	0	1	0	27	2
Atlético Mineiro	2018	Série A	36	3	12	1	7	1	1 (Note: Appearance(s) in Copa Sudamericana)	0	—		56	5
Atlético Mineiro	2019	Série A	28	4	9	1	4	0	14 (Note: Ten appearances and one goal in Copa Libertadores, four appearances in Copa Sudamericana)	1	—		55	6
Atlético Mineiro	Total		171	24	56	15	28	6	42	3	5	1	302	49
V-Varen Nagasaki	2020	J1 League	31	6	—		2	0	—		0	0	33	6
V-Varen Nagasaki	2021	J2 League	16	1	—		0	0	—		—		16	1
V-Varen Nagasaki	Total		47	7	—		2	0	—		0	0	49	7
Goiás	2022	Série A	2	0	7	0	3	0	—		—		12	0
Career total			237	33	142	50	35	6	42	3	55	10	511	102

== Honours ==
Atlético Sorocaba

- Copa Paulista: 2008

Atlético Mineiro

- Campeonato Mineiro: 2013, 2015, 2017
- Copa Libertadores: 2013
- Recopa Sudamericana: 2014
- Copa do Brasil: 2014
