= Edcarlos =

Brazilian footballer (born 1985)

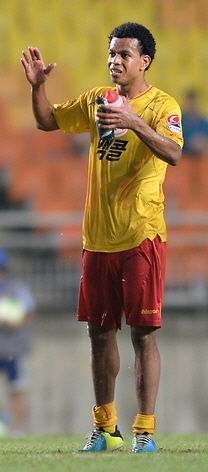
- Edcarlos with Seongnam Ilhwa Chunma in 2013

Personal information
- Full name: Edcarlos Conceição Santos
- Date of birth: May 10, 1985 (age 41)
- Place of birth: Salvador, Brazil
- Height: 1.86 m (6 ft 1 in)
- Position: Centre back

Youth career
- 2001–2002: São Paulo

Senior career*
Years	Team	Apps	(Gls)
2003–2007	São Paulo	96	(5)
2007–2009	Benfica	27	(0)
2008–2009	→ Fluminense (loan)	37	(1)
2010–2011	Cruz Azul	16	(2)
2010–2011	→ Cruzeiro (loan)	27	(3)
2011	Grêmio	12	(1)
2012	Sport	30	(1)
2013	Empoli	17	(0)
2014–2016	Atlético Mineiro	69	(4)
2017	Olimpia	15	(0)
2018	Goiás	23	(0)
2019	Vitória	14	(4)
2020	Juventude	7	(0)
2022	Betim		

International career
2003–2005	Brazil U20	14	(1)
- * Club domestic league appearances and goals as of 2 April 2019

Edcarlos Conceição Santos (born 10 May 1985), known simply as Edcarlos, is a Brazilian former professional footballer who played as a central defender.

== Club career ==
Edcarlos comes from the youth of São Paulo. In 2004, he joined the first team of the club, being part of the historic 2005 team that conquered the Campeonato Paulista and the Copa Libertadores and then the FIFA Club World Cup. He played the two games at the Club World Cup, helping São Paulo win the title for the first time in the club's history. The following year, he helped the team win their first Campeonato Brasileiro since 1991.

In 2007, he moved to Europe and signed with the Portuguese club Benfica in August 2007 for €1.8M. Under coach José Antonio Camacho he was a regular player and played among other things in the UEFA Champions League and the UEFA Cup, partnering with Luisão, due to David Luiz injury. However his performances were subpar and he moved on loan the following year, returning to his native Brazil, to Fluminense. After good performances in the first six months, he gradually lost his place, after getting less and less games.

In January 2010 he was sold to the Mexican club Cruz Azul for €1.3M. In July 2010, he returned to Brazil, being loaned to Cruzeiro, moving later to Grémio in August 2011.

== Honours ==
São Paulo

- Campeonato Paulista: 2005
- Copa Libertadores: 2005
- FIFA Club World Cup: 2005
- Campeonato Brasileiro Série A: 2006

Cruzeiro

- Campeonato Mineiro: 2011

Atlético Mineiro

- Recopa Sudamericana: 2014
- Copa do Brasil: 2014
- Campeonato Mineiro: 2015
