= Carlos César (footballer, born 1987) =

Brazilian footballer (born 1987)

Personal information
- Full name: Carlos César Neves
- Date of birth: 21 April 1987 (age 39)
- Place of birth: Uberaba, Brazil
- Height: 1.74 m (5 ft 9 in)
- Position: Right back

Youth career
- Criciúma

Senior career*
Years	Team	Apps	(Gls)
2006–2008	Criciúma	12	(1)
2009	Rio Claro		
2009–2010	Guarani	8	(0)
2011	Guarani-MG	11	(3)
2011–2012	Boa Esporte	8	(1)
2011–2012	→ Atlético Mineiro (loan)	12	(1)
2012–2019	Atlético Mineiro	48	(3)
2014	→ Atlético Paranaense (loan)	0	(0)
2014	→ Vasco da Gama (loan)	14	(2)
2018	→ Coritiba (loan)	2	(0)
2020	Criciúma	2	(0)
2021	Boa Esporte	0	(0)
- * Club domestic league appearances and goals as of 3 January 2019

Carlos César Neves (born 21 April 1987), is a Brazilian footballer who plays as a right back.

== Honours ==
Atlético Mineiro

- Campeonato Mineiro: 2012, 2013, 2015, 2017
- Copa Libertadores: 2013
