= Rodolfo (footballer, born 1995) =

Brazilian footballer

Personal information
- Full name: Rodolfo Pereira de Castro
- Date of birth: 12 April 1995 (age 31)
- Place of birth: Sete Lagoas, Brazil
- Height: 1.88 m (6 ft 2 in)
- Position: Goalkeeper

Team information
- Current team: Itabirito

Youth career
- Atlético Mineiro

Senior career*
Years	Team	Apps	(Gls)
2015–2017	Atlético Mineiro	0	(0)
2016	→ Boa (loan)	6	(0)
2016–2017	→ Académico Viseu (loan)	33	(0)
2018	Guarani	0	(0)
2019	Moto Club	29	(0)
2019–2022	Figueirense	71	(0)
2022	→ Marcílio Dias (loan)	8	(0)
2023	Avenida	10	(0)
2023–	Itabirito	10	(0)
- * Club domestic league appearances and goals as of 10 June 2023

Rodolfo Pereira de Castro (born 12 April 1995), known as Rodolfo, is a Brazilian football player who plays for Itabirito.

== Club career ==
He made his professional debut in the Campeonato Mineiro for Boa on 6 March 2016 in a game against Uberlândia.
