= Victor (footballer, born 1983) =

Brazilian footballer

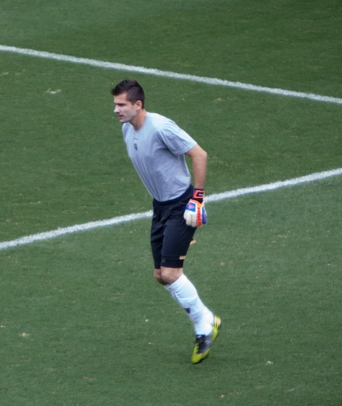
- Victor in action with Atlético Mineiro in 2012

Personal information
- Full name: Victor Leandro Bagy
- Date of birth: 21 January 1983 (age 43)
- Place of birth: Santo Anastácio, Brazil
- Height: 1.94 m (6 ft 4 in)
- Position: Goalkeeper

Youth career
- 1997: São Paulo
- 1998–2002: Paulista

Senior career*
Years	Team	Apps	(Gls)
2002–2007	Paulista	87	(0)
2002	→ Ituano (loan)	0	(0)
2008–2012	Grêmio	218	(0)
2012–2021	Atlético Mineiro	325	(0)
Total		609	(0)

International career
2010–2013	Brazil	6	(0)
- * Club domestic league appearances and goals

Victor Leandro Bagy (born 21 January 1983), known as Victor, is a Brazilian former professional footballer who played as a goalkeeper.

Having started his career with Paulista, where he spent his first six professional years and won the Copa do Brasil in 2005, Victor moved to Grêmio in 2008, where he finished as runner-up of the Campeonato Brasileiro Série A in his first season, receiving the Prêmio Craque do Brasileirão twice and the Bola de Prata once as best goalkeeper in the league during his spell with the club. He then joined Atlético Mineiro in 2012, where he won the Copa Libertadores in 2013 (being selected as the best goalkeeper of the tournament) and the Copa do Brasil in 2014, while again finishing as runner-up of the Brasileiro twice.

Victor has represented the Brazil national team since 2010, being part of the 2009 FIFA Confederations Cup winning squad, also being included in the 2011 Copa América and 2014 FIFA World Cup teams.

== Club career ==
=== Paulista ===
Born in Santo Anastácio, Victor joined São Paulo FC's youth setup in 1997, aged 14. However, a year later he moved to Paulista FC, due to the limited prospect of playing in the first-team. Victor was called up to the main squad in 2000, but had to wait until 2003 to make his senior debut. He served his first years mostly as a backup to Rafael Bracalli, but in 2006, after the latter's move to C.D. Nacional, he was chosen as first-choice; Victor also was a part of the squad which won the 2005 Copa do Brasil, but remained as a substitute for both legs of the final.

=== Grêmio ===
On 18 December 2007, Victor joined Grêmio, with the Tricolor paying R$400,000 for a half of his registration rights. He retained a starting spot during his first games at the club, but suffered an injury on 24 February 2008, being sidelined for one and a half month. Victor returned from injury and was an undisputed starter during the year, appearing in all matches during the Brasileirão and winning the Prêmio Craque do Brasileirão for best goalkeeper of the tournament. In 2009, he was again the championship's best, winning both the Bola de Prata and the Craque do Brasileirão, but his contribution was reduced due to call-ups to the national side. In the summer, Victor was linked to Bari and Benfica, but nothing came of it.

On 18 June 2010, he signed a new contract with Grêmio, running until 2015. Victor remained in the starting eleven, and his side finished fourth. However, in the following years, Grêmio struggled to keep the same levels of the past seasons, but he appeared 32 times in 2011.

=== Atlético Mineiro ===
On 29 June 2012, Victor joined Atlético Mineiro for a €3.5 million fee, signing a five-year contract. He immediately became the first-choice goalkeeper in his new club, appearing in 29 matches as Galo finished second in the 2012 Campeonato Brasileiro. In 2013, Victor was one of the key figures of Atlético Mineiro's 2013 Copa Libertadores winning run. An iconic moment for him and the club happened in the second leg of that competition's quarter-finals, when a penalty kick was awarded to Club Tijuana in injury time. It would have meant elimination for Atlético if it had been scored, but was saved by Victor with his foot. The save, according to sports commentators and fans, represented the kicking out of the club's historic "bad luck". Victor also made saves in the penalty shoot-outs against Newell's Old Boys in the semi-finals and Club Olimpia in the finals, and was elected the competition's best goalkeeper.

== International career ==
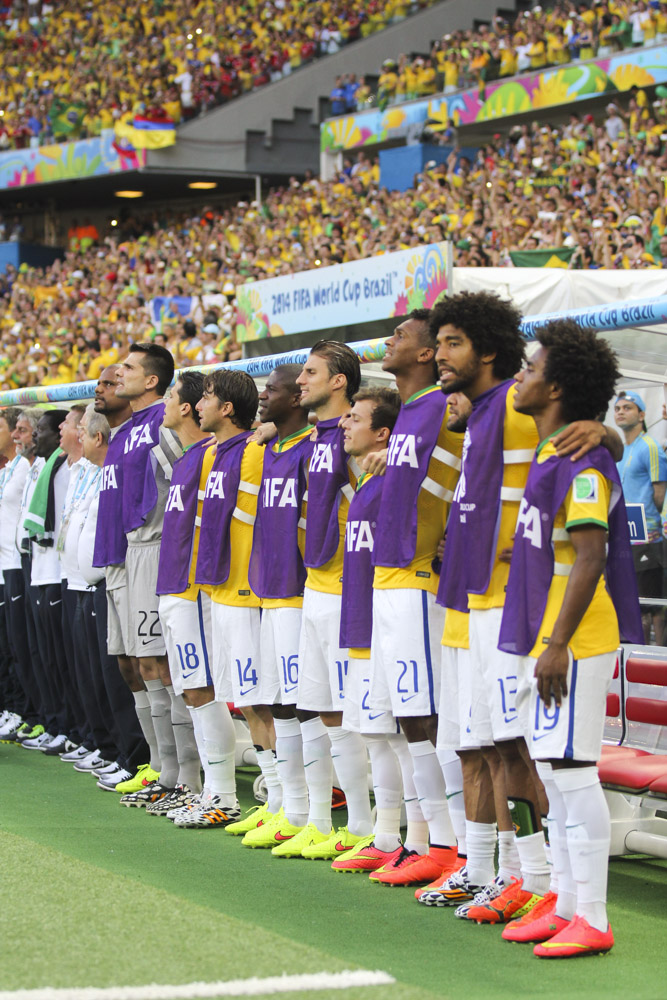
Victor (# 22) at the 2014 FIFA World Cup.

On 21 May 2009, Victor was called up for the second time (2005 was the first) to the Brazil national team for 2010 FIFA World Cup qualification. On 10 August 2010, he made his debut with the main squad, starting in a 2–0 friendly match win against United States. He was included as a substitute goalkeeper in the Brazilian squad for 2009 FIFA Confederations Cup. Also, he was part of the squad for 2011 Copa América. On 7 May 2014, Victor was included among the 23-man squad ahead of 2014 FIFA World Cup.

== Personal life ==
Victor is Roman Catholic.

== Career statistics ==
=== Club ===
Appearances and goals by club, season and competition
Club	Season	League			State League		Cup		Continental		Other		Total	
Club	Season	Division	Apps	Goals	Apps	Goals	Apps	Goals	Apps	Goals	Apps	Goals	Apps	Goals
Paulista	2004	Série B	0	0	1	0	0	0	—		—		1	0
Paulista	2005	Série B	1	0	0	0	0	0	—		—		1	0
Paulista	2006	Série B	28	0	2	0	—		0	0	—		30	0
Paulista	2007	Série B	37	0	18	0	—		—		—		55	0
Paulista	Total		66	0	21	0	0	0	0	0	—		87	0
Grêmio	2008	Série A	38	0	8	0	1	0	—		—		47	0
Grêmio	2009	Série A	28	0	16	0	—		10 (Note: Appearance(s) in Copa Libertadores)	0	—		54	0
Grêmio	2010	Série A	35	0	21	0	9	0	1 (Note: Appearance(s) in Copa Sudamericana)	0	—		66	0
Grêmio	2011	Série A	32	0	14	0	—		8	0	—		54	0
Grêmio	2012	Série A	6	0	20	0	10	0	0	0	—		36	0
Grêmio	Total		139	0	79	0	20	0	19	0	—		257	0
Atlético Mineiro	2012	Série A	29	0	—		—		—		—		29	0
Atlético Mineiro	2013	Série A	29	0	13	0	2	0	14	0	2 (Note: Appearance(s) in FIFA Club World Cup)	0	60	0
Atlético Mineiro	2014	Série A	32	0	10	0	8	0	7	0	2 (Note: Appearance(s) in Recopa Sudamericana)	0	59	0
Atlético Mineiro	2015	Série A	38	0	15	0	2	0	8	0	—		63	0
Atlético Mineiro	2016	Série A	32	0	10	0	7	0	8	0	2 (Note: Appearance(s) in Primeira Liga)	0	59	0
Atlético Mineiro	2017	Série A	36	0	3	0	4	0	4	0	2	0	49	0
Atlético Mineiro	2018	Série A	38	0	15	0	8	0	2	0	—		63	0
Atlético Mineiro	2019	Série A	10	0	10	0	4	0	10 (Note: Nine appearances in Copa Libertadores, one appearance in Copa Sudamericana)	0	—		34	0
Atlético Mineiro	2020	Série A	1	0	3	0	0	0	0	0	—		4	0
Atlético Mineiro	2021	Série A	0	0	1	0	0	0	0	0	—		1	0
Atlético Mineiro	Total		245	0	80	0	35	0	53	0	8	0	421	0
Career total			450	0	180	0	55	0	72	0	8	0	776	0

=== International ===
Appearances and goals by national team and year
National team	Year	Apps	Goals
Brazil	2010	4	0
Brazil	2011	1	0
Brazil	2013	1	0
Total		6	0

== Honours ==
Paulista

- Copa do Brasil: 2005

Grêmio

- Campeonato Gaúcho: 2010

Atlético Mineiro

- Copa Libertadores: 2013
- Recopa Sudamericana: 2014
- Copa do Brasil: 2014
- Campeonato Mineiro: 2013, 2015, 2017, 2020, 2021

Brazil

- FIFA Confederations Cup: 2009

Individual

- Campeonato Brasileiro Série A Team of the Year: 2008, 2009
- Bola de Prata: 2009
- Copa Libertadores Goalkeeper of Year: 2013
