= Ronaldão (stadium) =

Football stadium in Poços de Caldas, Brazil

Coordinates: 21°46′40″S 46°36′21″W

Estádio Dr. Ronaldo Junqueira
- Ronaldão
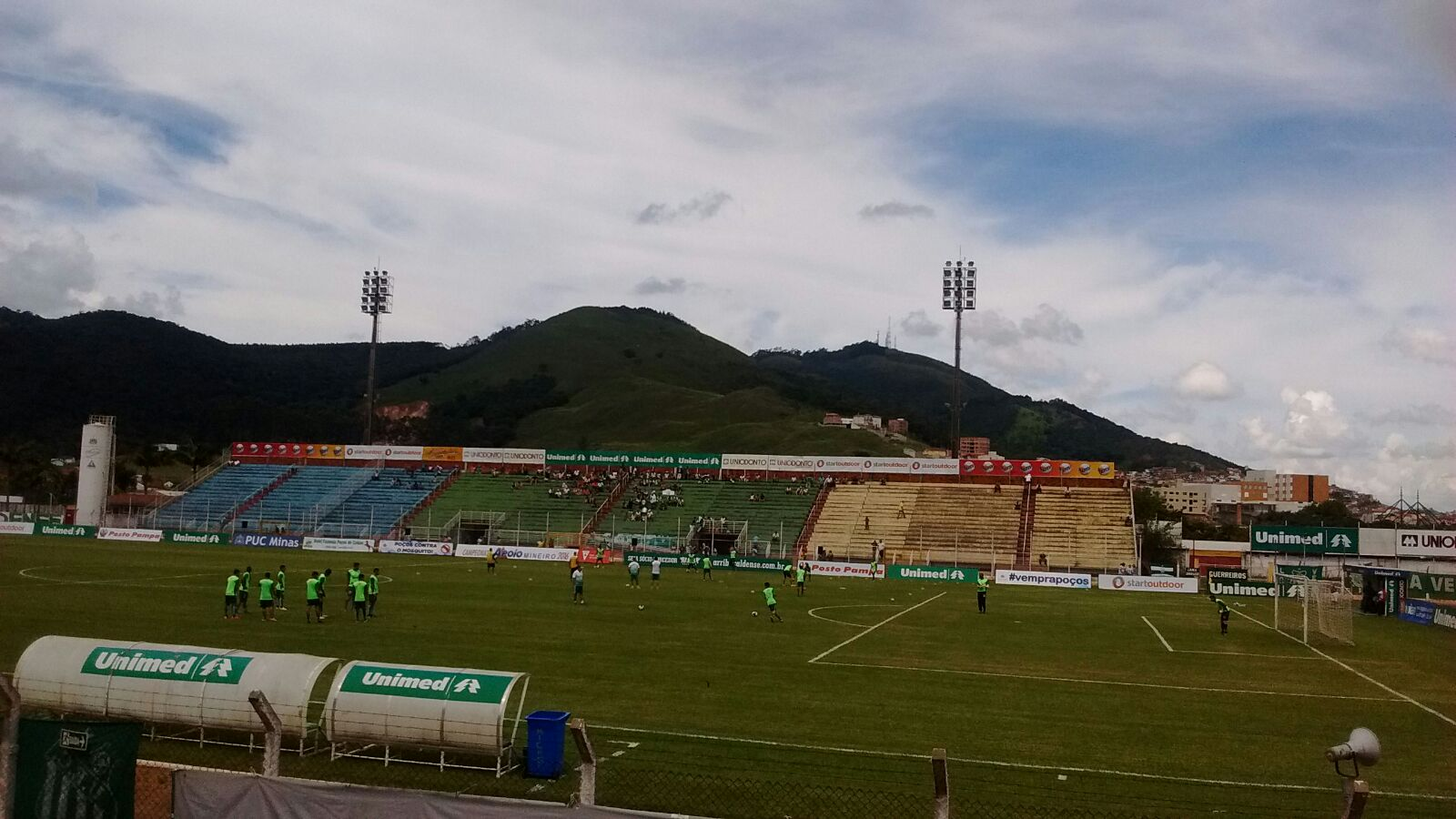
- The stadium on a matchday in 2016
- Interactive map of Estádio Dr. Ronaldo Junqueira
- Full name: Estádio Dr. Ronaldo Junqueira
- Location: Poços de Caldas, Brazil
- Owner: Poços de Caldas Town Hall
- Capacity: 14,000

Construction
- Built: 1979
- Opened: September 4, 1979

Tenants
- Associação Atlética Caldense; Poços de Caldas Futebol Clube

Ronaldão, also known as Estádio Dr. Ronaldo Junqueira, is a multi-purpose stadium located in Poços de Caldas, Brazil. It is used mostly for football matches and hosts the home matches of Associação Atlética Caldense and Poços de Caldas Futebol Clube. The stadium has a maximum capacity of 14,000 people.

Ronaldão is owned by the Poços de Caldas Town Hall. The stadium's formal name honors Ronaldo Junqueira, who was Poços de Caldas' mayor during the stadium construction.

== History ==
In 1979, the works on Ronaldão were completed. The inaugural match was played on September 4 of that year, when Corinthians beat Caldense 3–0. The first goal of the stadium was scored by Corinthians' Basílio.

The stadium's attendance record currently stands at 7,790, set on April 27, 1997 when Caldense and Cruzeiro drew 1–1.
