= Associação Atlética Caldense =

Caldense
- Full name: Associação Atlética Caldense
- Nickname: Veterana
- Founded: 5 September 1925; 100 years ago
- Ground: Ronaldão
- Capacity: 8,000
- Chairman: Laércio Otávio Martins
- Head coach: Mauro Fernandes
- League: Campeonato Mineiro Módulo II
- 2025: Mineiro Módulo II, 10th of 12
| Home colours | Away colours |

Associação Atlética Caldense, commonly known as Caldense, is a Brazilian professional association football club based in Poços de Caldas, Minas Gerais. The team plays in Série D, the fourth tier of the Brazilian football league system, as well as in the Campeonato Mineiro, the top tier of the Minas Gerais state football league.

Founded on 7 September 1925, it plays its games at the Dr. Ronaldo Junqueira Stadium (Ronaldão). Its colors are green and white and the parakeet is the mascot. In addition to professional football, the club also fields teams in futsal, swimming, volleyball, basketball, tennis, shuttlecock, cricket, table tennis and several others. Historically, its biggest rival is Rio Branco de Andradas Futebol Clube.

Caldense play in green and white uniforms.

== History ==
Football came to Poços de Caldas in 1904, with the foundation of Foot-Ball Club Caldense. However, it would take until 1920 for the first football championships to occur in the area.

Caldense was then founded on 7 September 1925, using remanescents of Foot-Ball Club Caldense, in Poços de Caldas. The first directory of the team had João de Moura Gavião as president, Hugo Sarmento as vice-president, Romeu Chiacchio as first secretary, Cherubim Borelli as second secretary, Caetano Pereira as treasurer, Flamínio Maurício as attourney, and Octávio Mantovani como sportive director. The Inquiry Committee was composed by João de Oliveira Carmo, Antônio Ricci Júnior, Domingos Lamberti, Vitor Fortunato and Adolpho Guetti. That same year, the city’s first big stadium, Christiano Osório, constructed in the year 1923, was definitely given to Caldense.

In April 3rd, 1926, Associação Atlética Caldense and Gambrinus Futebol Clube fused.

Caldense's first stadium, called Cristiano Osório, was built by Local Futebol Clube in 1923 and was brought by Caldense in 1925.

== Crests and colours ==
Caldense's first badge, used between 1925 and 1928.

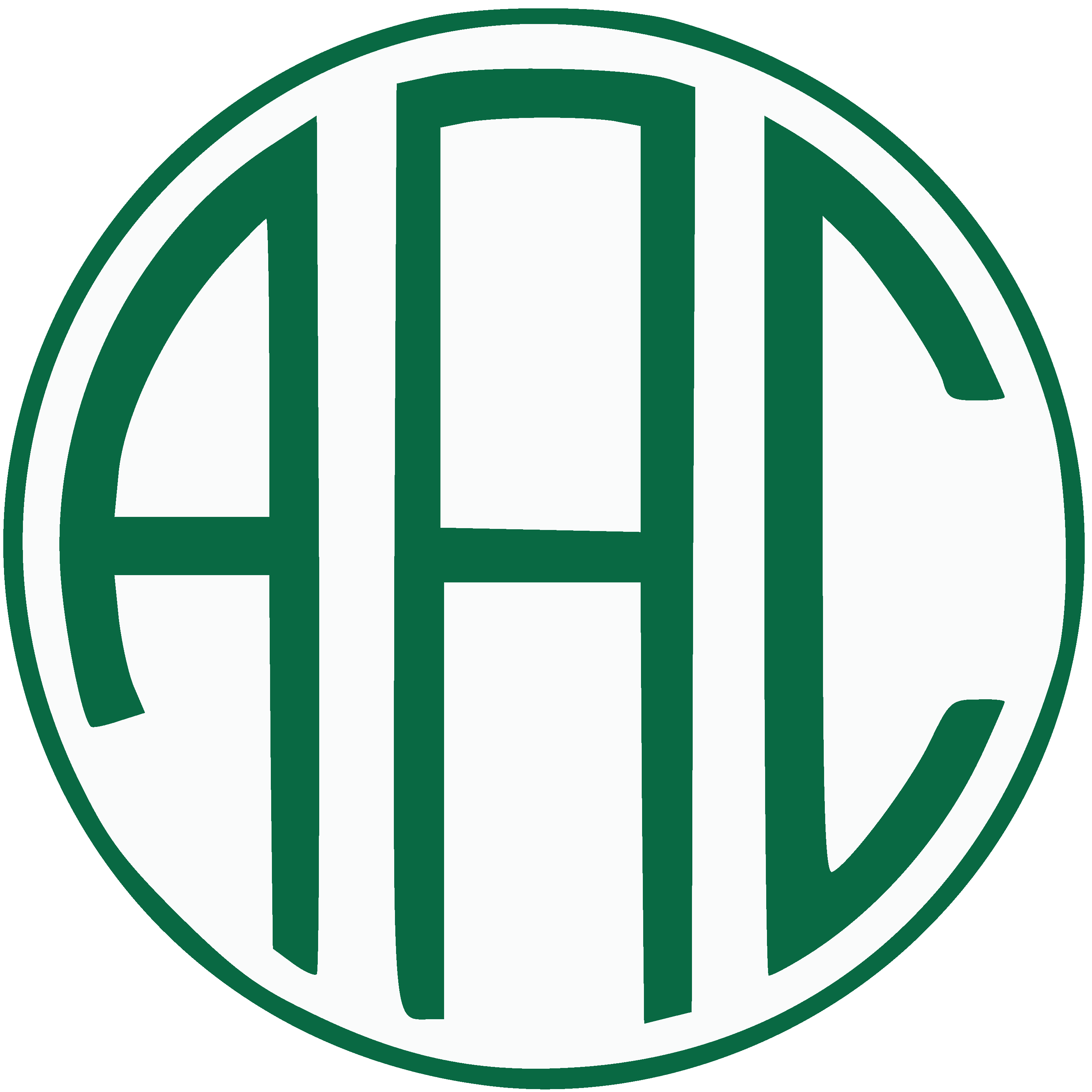
Caldense's second badge, used likely from 1929 until 1940.

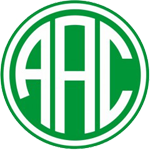
Caldense's badge, used from 1941 to 1947.

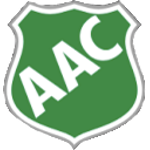
Caldense's badge first used in 1948.

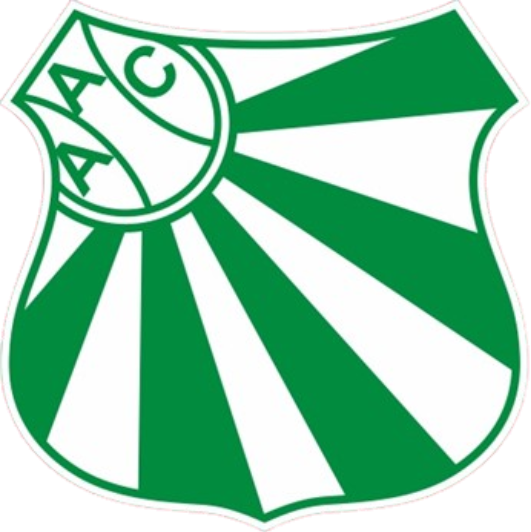
Caldense's badge in the 1970s

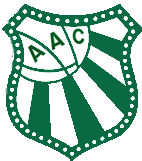
Caldense's badge, used until 1997.

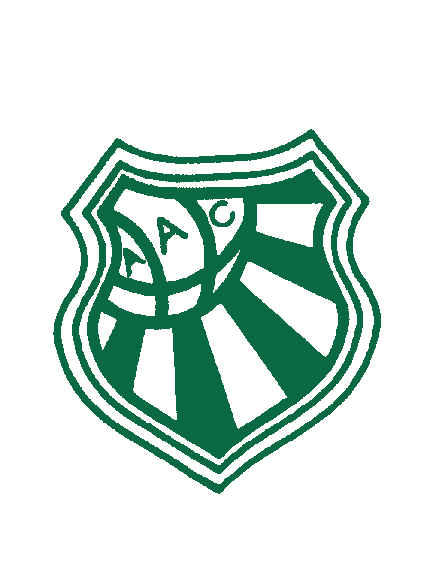
Caldense's badge used between 1998 and 2002.

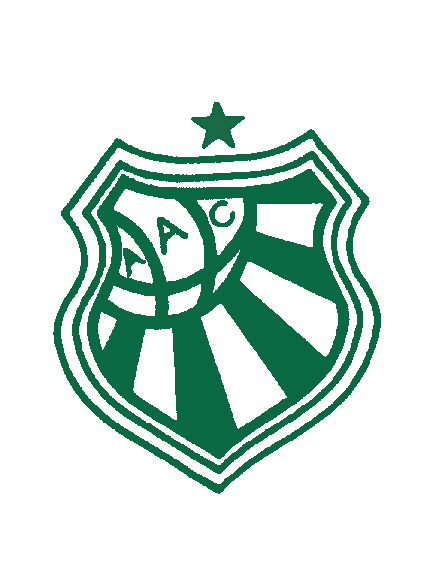
Caldense's badge used in 2002, when they won their first Campeonato Mineiro title.

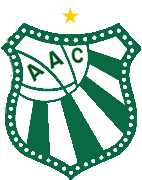
Caldense's badge used between 2003 and 2004.

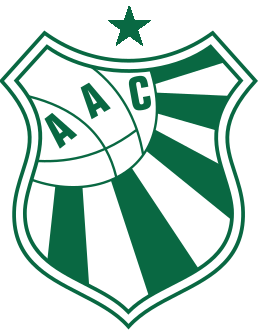
Caldense's badge used between 2005 and 2006.

Caldense's badge used between 2007 and 2011.

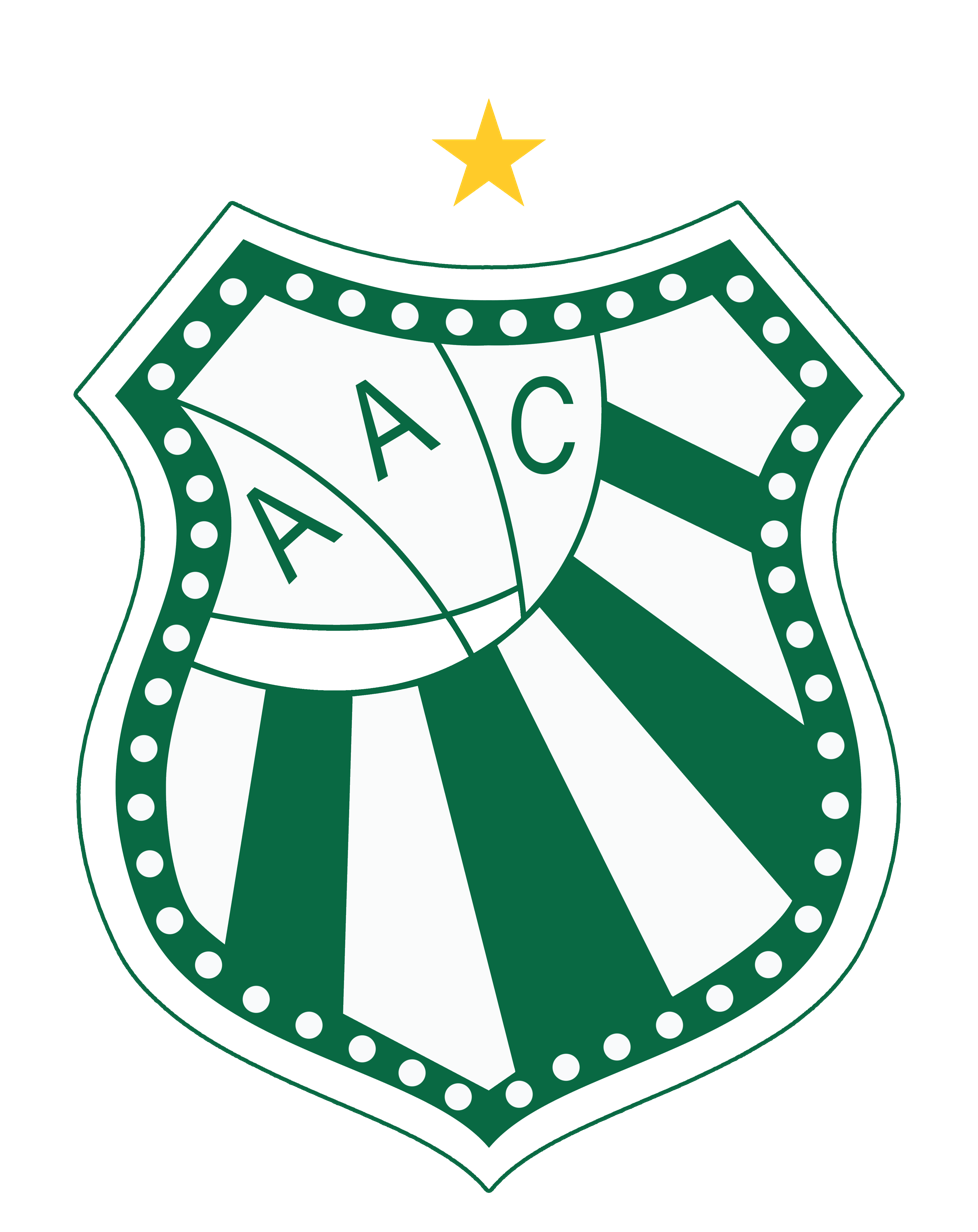
Caldense's current badge, used since 2012.

== Honours ==
=== Official tournaments ===
State
| Competitions | Titles | Seasons |
|---|---|---|
| Campeonato Mineiro | 1 | 2002 |

=== Others tournaments ===
==== State ====
- Torneio Incentivo Mineiro (2): 1975, 1983
- Campeonato Mineiro do Interior (8): 1974, 1975, 1976, 1977, 1996, 2002, 2004, 2015

=== Runners-up ===
- Campeonato Mineiro (1): 2015
- Campeonato Mineiro Módulo II (2): 1969, 1985, 2009

== Stadium ==
Caldense plays at the municipal stadium Estádio Ronaldão, built in 1979, with a maximum capacity of 14,000 people.

== Trivia ==
On November 22, 1968, the club played their first match in Belo Horizonte city, against Cruzeiro at Independência stadium. The match ended 3–0 in favour of Cruzeiro.
