= 2015 Campeonato Mineiro =

Campeonato Mineiro
- Season: 2015
- Dates: 1 February – 3 May 2015
- Champions: Atlético Mineiro
- Relegated: EC Democrata; Mamoré
- Copa do Brasil: Atlético Mineiro; Caldense; Cruzeiro
- Série D: Caldense; Villa Nova
- Matches: 38
- Goals: 88 (2.32 per match)
- Top goalscorer: Leandro Damião (9 goals)
- Biggest home win: Caldense 6–1 Mamoré (1 February)
- Biggest away win: Villa Nova 0–4 Cruzeiro (11 March)
- Highest scoring: Caldense 6–1 Mamoré (1 February)
- Highest attendance: 53,585; Atlético Mineiro 0–0 Caldense (26 April)
- Lowest attendance: 189; Villa Nova 0-1 Caldense (5 April)
- Average attendance: 5,377

The Campeonato Mineiro de Futebol de 2015 - Módulo I (also known as the Mineiro UNICEF 2015) was the 101st edition of the Campeonato Mineiro, Minas Gerais's top professional football league. The season started on 1 February 2015 and concluded on 3 May 2015.

A total of 12 teams competed in the league: 8 sides from the 2014 season and two promoted from the 2014 Módulo II. Cruzeiro were the defending champions. On 3 May 2015, Atlético Mineiro were crowned champions for the 43rd time.

== Format ==
=== First stage ===
The 2015 Módulo I first stage was played by 12 clubs in single round-robin, with all teams playing each other once. The four best-placed teams qualified for the final stage and the last two teams were relegated to the 2016 Módulo II.

The league also selected Minas Gerais's representatives in the Campeonato Brasileiro Série D and the Copa do Brasil. The two best placed teams not already qualified to the 2015 seasons of the Série A, Série B or Série C, earned the spots to the 2015 Série D. The three best placed teams qualified to the 2016 Copa do Brasil.

=== Knockout stage ===
The knockout stage was played between the 4 best placed teams from the previous stage, with semifinals and finals played in a two-legged tie. The best placed team in the first stage in each contest had the right to choose whether to play its home game in the first or second leg. The best placed team in the first stage in each contest could win it with two ties.

== Teams ==
Team	Home city	Stadium	Capacity	2014 result
América Mineiro	Belo Horizonte	Independência	23,018	4th
Atlético Mineiro	Belo Horizonte	Independência	23,018	2nd
Boa Esporte	Varginha	Melão	15,471	3rd
Caldense	Poços de Caldas	Ronaldão	7,600	8th
Cruzeiro	Belo Horizonte	Mineirão	61,846	1st
EC Democrata	Governador Valadares	Mamudão	8,674	2nd in Módulo II
Guarani	Divinópolis	Farião	4,181	10th
Mamoré	Patos de Minas	Arena Kickball	12,000	1st in Módulo II
Tombense	Tombos	Almeidão	3,050	7th
Tupi	Juiz de Fora	Mario Helênio	31,863	5th
URT	Patos de Minas	Arena DanBred	4,858	9th
Villa Nova	Nova Lima	Castor Cifuentes	5,160	6th

== First stage ==
Pos	Team	Pld	W	D	L	GF	GA	GD	Pts	Qualification or relegation
1	Caldense (A)	11	7	4	0	16	4	+12	25	Qualification to the knockout stage
2	Cruzeiro (A)	11	7	3	1	23	7	+16	24	Qualification to the knockout stage
3	Atlético Mineiro (A)	11	7	1	3	20	7	+13	22	Qualification to the knockout stage
4	Tombense (A)	11	6	2	3	17	14	+3	20	Qualification to the knockout stage
5	América Mineiro	11	5	5	1	12	7	+5	20	
6	Villa Nova	11	3	4	4	7	15	−8	13	
7	Boa Esporte	11	2	5	4	8	10	−2	11	
8	URT	11	3	1	7	8	15	−7	10	
9	Tupi	11	3	1	7	9	17	−8	10	
10	Guarani	11	2	4	5	8	15	−7	10	
11	EC Democrata (R)	11	2	2	7	9	16	−7	8	Relegation to Módulo II
12	Mamoré (R)	11	2	2	7	9	19	−10	8	Relegation to Módulo II

Updated to match(es) played on 5 April 2015. Source:
Rules for classification: 1st points; 2nd wins; 3rd goal difference; 4th goals scored; 5th head-to-head points (only when two teams are tied) 5th less red cards received; 6th less yellow cards received; 7th public draw
(A) Advance to a further round; (R) Relegated

== Knockout stage ==
=== Semifinals ===
==== First leg ====
11 April 2015
16:00 UTC–3

Tombense	0–0	Caldense
	Report

Almeidão, Tombos
Attendance: 2,124
Referee: Ricardo Marques Ribeiro

12 April 2015
16:00 UTC–3

Atlético Mineiro	1–1	Cruzeiro
Carlos 39'	Report	De Arrascaeta 54'

Independência, Belo Horizonte
Attendance: 16,153
Referee: Raphael Claus

==== Second leg ====
19 April 2015
18:30 UTC–3

Caldense	2–0	Tombense
Tiago Azulão 23'; Luiz Eduardo 59'	Report

Ronaldão, Poços de Caldas
Attendance: 4,234
Referee: Emerson de Almeida Ferreira

19 April 2015
16:00 UTC–3

Cruzeiro	1–2	Atlético Mineiro
De Arrascaeta 11'	Report	Pratto 55', 87'

Mineirão, Belo Horizonte
Attendance: 40,364
Referee: Héber Roberto Lopes

=== Finals ===
26 April 2015
16:00 UTC–3

Atlético Mineiro	0–0	Caldense
	Report

Mineirão, Belo Horizonte
Attendance: 53,585
Referee: Cleisson Veloso Pereira

3 May 2015
16:00 UTC–3

Caldense	1–2	Atlético Mineiro
Luiz Eduardo 59'	Report	Thiago Ribeiro 56'; Jô 78'

Melão, Varginha
Attendance: 14,165
Referee: Emerson de Almeida Ferreira

=== Bracket ===
Semifinals
1	Caldense	0	2	2
4	Tombense	0	0	0
2	Cruzeiro	1	1	2
3	Atlético Mineiro	1	2	3

Finals
1	Caldense	0	1	1
2	Atlético Mineiro	0	2	2

== General table ==
Pos	Team	Pld	W	D	L	GF	GA	GD	Pts	Qualification or relegation
1	Atlético Mineiro (C)	15	9	3	3	25	10	+15	30	Qualification to the 2016 Copa do Brasil
2	Caldense	15	8	6	1	19	6	+13	30	Qualification to the 2015 Série D and the 2016 Copa do Brasil
3	Cruzeiro	13	7	4	2	25	10	+15	25	Qualification to the 2016 Copa do Brasil
4	Tombense	13	6	3	4	17	16	+1	21	
5	América Mineiro	11	5	5	1	12	7	+5	20	
6	Villa Nova	11	3	4	4	7	15	−8	13	Qualification to the 2015 Série D
7	Boa Esporte	11	2	5	4	8	10	−2	11	
8	URT	11	3	1	7	8	15	−7	10	
9	Tupi	11	3	1	7	9	17	−8	10	
10	Guarani	11	2	4	5	8	15	−7	10	
11	EC Democrata (R)	11	2	2	7	9	16	−7	8	Relegation to Módulo II
12	Mamoré (R)	11	2	2	7	9	19	−10	8	Relegation to Módulo II

Updated to match(es) played on 3 May 2015. Source:
Rules for classification: 1st points; 2nd wins; 3rd goal difference; 4th goals scored; 5th head-to-head points (only when two teams are tied) 5th less red cards received; 6th less yellow cards received; 7th public draw
(C) Champions; (R) Relegated

== Top goalscorers ==
As of match played on 3 May 2015.

Rank	Player	Club	Goals
1	(Brazil) Leandro Damião	Cruzeiro	9
2	(Brazil) Luiz Eduardo	Caldense	8
3	(Brazil) João Paulo	EC Democrata	6
3	(Argentina) Lucas Pratto	Atlético Mineiro	6
4	(Brazil) Cristiano	Caldense	5
4	(Brazil) Daniel Morais	Tupi	5
4	(Brazil) Luan	Atlético Mineiro	5
5	(Uruguay) Giorgian De Arrascaeta	Cruzeiro	4
5	(Brazil) Daniel Amorim	Tombense	4
