= 2016 Clube Atlético Mineiro season =

Atlético Mineiro
2016 season
- President: Daniel Nepomuceno
- Head Coach: Diego Aguirre (until 19 May); Marcelo Oliveira (from 20 May)
- Stadium: Independência; Mineirão
- Campeonato Brasileiro: 4th
- Campeonato Mineiro: Runner-up
- Copa do Brasil: Runner-up
- Copa Libertadores: Quarter-finals
- Primeira Liga: Group stage
- Top goalscorer: League: Juan Cazares (6); All: Robinho (14)
- Highest home attendance: 46,415 vs América Mineiro (8 May)
- Lowest home attendance: 4,889 vs Santos (14 May)
- Average home league attendance: 19,459
Home colours	Away colours

The 2016 season is Clube Atlético Mineiro's 108th in existence and tenth consecutive season in the top-flight of Brazilian football. Along with the Campeonato Brasileiro Série A and the Campeonato Mineiro, the club will also compete in the Copa Libertadores, the Copa do Brasil and the Primeira Liga.

== Season overview ==
=== Background and pre-season ===
Atlético Mineiro finished as runner-up in the previous season's Campeonato Brasileiro Série A, and qualified to the 2016 Copa Libertadores. Levir Culpi, the head coach for most of 2015, mutually terminated its contract in the end of that year, being replaced by Uruguayan Diego Aguirre, who took charge in January 2016. Atlético took part in Florida Cup, a pre-season competition in the US, which it won.

== Players ==
=== Squad information ===
Players and squad numbers last updated on 26 June 2016.
Note: Flags indicate national team as has been defined under FIFA eligibility rules. Players may hold more than one non-FIFA nationality.

Number	Name	Nat.	Position(s)	Date of birth (age)	Signed in	Signed from	Notes
Goalkeepers
1	Victor	(Brazil)	GK	21 January 1983 (age 43)	2012	(Brazil) Grêmio	Second vice-captain
20	Giovanni	(Brazil)	GK	5 February 1987 (age 39)	2011	(Brazil) Grêmio Barueri	
34	Uilson	(Brazil)	GK	28 April 1994 (age 32)	2014	(Brazil) Youth Sector	
Defenders
2	Marcos Rocha	(Brazil)	RB	11 December 1988 (age 37)	2008	(Brazil) Youth Sector	
3	Leonardo Silva	(Brazil)	CB	22 June 1979 (age 47)	2011	(Brazil) Cruzeiro	Captain
4	Frickson Erazo	(Ecuador)	CB	5 May 1988 (age 38)	2016	(Brazil) Grêmio	
5	Douglas Santos	(Brazil)	LB	22 March 1994 (age 32)	2014	(Italy) Udinese	
15	Edcarlos	(Brazil)	CB	10 May 1985 (age 41)	2014	(South Korea) Seongnam FC	Vice-captain
19	Carlos César	(Brazil)	RB	21 April 1987 (age 39)	2011	(Brazil) Boa Esporte	
26	Tiago	(Brazil)	CB	17 June 1990 (age 36)	2014	(Brazil) Caxias	
29	Patric	(Brazil)	RB	25 March 1989 (age 37)	2011	(Portugal) Benfica	
31	Gabriel	(Brazil)	CB	14 March 1995 (age 31)	2016	(Brazil) Youth Sector	
33	Ronaldo Conceição	(Brazil)	CB	3 April 1987 (age 39)	2016	(Uruguay) River Plate Montevideo	
38	Jesiel	(Brazil)	CB	5 March 1994 (age 32)	2015	(Brazil) Youth Sector	
39	Fábio Santos	(Brazil)	LB	16 September 1985 (age 41)	2016	(Mexico) Cruz Azul	
Midfielders
5	Rafael Carioca	(Brazil)	DM / CM	18 June 1989 (age 37)	2015	(Russia) Spartak Moscow	
8	Leandro Donizete	(Brazil)	DM / CM	18 May 1982 (age 44)	2012	(Brazil) Coritiba	Second vice-captain
10	Jesús Dátolo	(Argentina)	CM / AM	19 May 1984 (age 42)	2013	(Brazil) Internacional	
11	Juan Cazares	(Ecuador)	AM	3 April 1992 (age 34)	2016	(Argentina) Banfield	
18	Lucas Cândido	(Brazil)	DM / LB	25 December 1993 (age 32)	2013	(Brazil) Youth Sector	
21	Júnior Urso	(Brazil)	DM / CM	10 March 1989 (age 37)	2016	(China) Shandong Luneng	On loan
22	Carlos Eduardo	(Brazil)	AM / LW	21 March 1992 (age 34)	2016	(Russia) Rubin Kazan	
25	Yago	(Brazil)	CM	7 July 1995 (age 31)	2016	(Brazil) Youth Sector	
30	Eduardo	(Brazil)	DM / CM	17 May 1995 (age 31)	2014	(Brazil) Guarani	
Forwards
7	Robinho	(Brazil)	ST / CF / LW	25 January 1984 (age 42)	2016	(China) Guangzhou Evergrande	
9	Lucas Pratto	(Argentina)	ST / CF	4 June 1988 (age 38)	2015	(Argentina) Vélez Sarsfield	
13	Carlos	(Brazil)	ST / CF / RW	15 August 1995 (age 31)	2014	(Brazil) Youth Sector	
17	Hyuri	(Brazil)	CF / LW	26 September 1991 (age 35)	2016	(China) Beijing Renhe	
23	Clayton	(Brazil)	CF / RW	23 October 1995 (age 31)	2016	(Brazil) Figueirense	
27	Luan	(Brazil)	LW / RW	11 August 1990 (age 36)	2013	(Brazil) Ponte Preta	
28	Capixaba	(Brazil)	LW/ RW	9 January 1997 (age 29)	2016	(Brazil) Youth Sector	
99	Fred	(Brazil)	ST	3 October 1983 (age 43)	2016	(Brazil) Fluminense	

=== Transfers ===
==== In ====
Date	Pos.	Player	Age	Moving from	Notes	Source
4 January 2015	MF	(Ecuador) Juan Cazares	23	(Argentina) Banfield		
4 January 2016	DF	(Ecuador) Frickson Erazo	27	(Brazil) Grêmio		
4 January 2016	FW	(Brazil) Hyuri	24	(China) Beijing Renhe		
4 January 2016	FW	(Brazil) Pablo	23	(Brazil) América Mineiro	Return from loan	
11 February 2016	FW	(Brazil) Robinho	32	(China) Guangzhou Evergrande		
23 February 2016	FW	(Brazil) Rafael Moura	30	(Brazil) Internacional		
3 March 2016	FW	(Brazil) Clayton	20	(Brazil) Figueirense		
30 March 2016	GK	(Brazil) Lauro	35	(Brazil) Lajeadense		
20 April 2016	MF	(Brazil) Carlos Eduardo	28	(Russia) Rubin Kazan		
9 June 2016	FW	(Brazil) Fred	32	(Brazil) Fluminense		
13 June 2016	DF	(Brazil) Ronaldo Conceição	29	(Uruguay) River Plate Montevideo		
14 June 2016	DF	(Brazil) Fábio Santos	30	(Mexico) Cruz Azul		

==== Loans in ====
Date	Pos.	Player	Age	Loaned from	Notes	Source
19 February 2016	MF	(Brazil) Júnior Urso	26	(China) Shandong Luneng	Until February 2017	

==== Out ====
Date	Pos.	Player	Age	Moving to	Notes	Source
21 December 2015	MF	(Brazil) Serginho	29	(Brazil) Sport Recife		
4 February 2016	MF	(Brazil) Giovanni Augusto	26	(Brazil) Corinthians		
5 February 2016	FW	(Brazil) André	25	(Brazil) Corinthians		
31 January 2016	DF	(Brazil) Jemerson	23	(France) Monaco		
2 June 2016	DF	(Brazil) Emerson Conceição	30	(Brazil) Coritiba		
22 June 2016	GK	(Brazil) Lauro	35	(Brazil) Ceará		

== Technical staff ==
Position	Name
Head coach	(Brazil) Marcelo Oliveira
Assistant coach	(Brazil) Tico
Assistant coach	(Brazil) Eduardo Abdo
Technical Supervisor	(Brazil) Carlos Alberto Isidoro
Technical Coordinator	(Brazil) Carlinhos Neves
Fitness coach	(Brazil) Luís Otávio Kalil
Fitness coach	(Brazil) Juvenilson de Souza
Goalkeeping coach	(Brazil) Francisco Cersósimo
Sports Technology Assistant	(Brazil) Alexandre Ceolin
Scout	(Brazil) Bernardo Motta
Doctor	(Brazil) Rodrigo Lasmar
Doctor	(Brazil) Marcus Vinícius
Doctor	(Brazil) Otaviano Oliveira
Physiotherapist	(Brazil) Rômulo Frank
Physiotherapist	(Brazil) Guilherme Fialho
Physiologist	(Brazil) Roberto Chiari
Dentist	(Brazil) Marcelo Lasmar
Nutritionist	(Brazil) Evandro Vasconcelos
Nutritionist	(Brazil) Natália Carvalho
Masseur	(Brazil) Belmiro Oliveira
Masseur	(Brazil) Eduardo Vasconcelos
Masseur	(Brazil) Hélio Gomes
Field Assistant	(Brazil) Rubens Pinheiro
Kit manager	(Brazil) João de Deus
Kit manager	(Brazil) Luciano Caxeado

Last updated: 26 June 2016
Source: Comissão Técnica – Atlético (in Portuguese)

== Pre-season ==
Win Draw Loss

13 January 2016 Florida Cup	Schalke 04 (Germany)	0–3	(Brazil) Atlético Mineiro	Fort Lauderdale, United States
18:30 (UTC−5)		Report	Leonardo Silva 8'; Luan (yellow card) 59'; Patric 81'; Lucas Cândido 83'	Stadium: Lockhart Stadium; Attendance: 2,504; Referee: Ted Unkel (United States)

17 January 2016 Florida Cup	Atlético Mineiro (Brazil)	1–0	(Brazil) Corinthians	Boca Raton, United States
14:00 (UTC−5)	Leonardo Silva (yellow card) 56'; Hyuri 57'; Marcos Rocha (yellow card) 75'	Report		Stadium: FAU Stadium; Referee: Marcos Oliveira (Brazil)

== Competitions ==
=== Overview ===
Competition	First match	Last match	Starting round	Final position	Record							
Competition	First match	Last match	Starting round	Final position	Pld	W	D	L	GF	GA	GD	Win %
Campeonato Mineiro	31 January 2016	8 May 2016	Matchday 1	Runners-up	15	7	4	4	31	16	+15	46.67
Campeonato Brasileiro Série A	14 May 2016	11 December 2016	Round 1	4th	38	17	11	10	61	53	+8	44.74
Primeira Liga	27 January 2016	2 March 2016	Group stage	Group stage	3	0	1	2	2	5	−3	0.00
Copa do Brasil	24 August 2016	7 December 2016	Round of 16	Runners-up	8	2	4	2	10	11	−1	25.00
Copa Libertadores	17 February 2016	18 May 2016	Group stage	Quarterfinals	10	6	2	2	16	7	+9	60.00
Total					74	32	22	20	120	92	+28	43.24

Source: Competitions

=== Primeira Liga ===
==== Group stage ====
Pos	Team	Pld	W	D	L	GF	GA	GD	Pts	Qualification	FLA	FIG	AME	CAM
1	Flamengo	3	2	1	0	4	1	+3	7	Knockout stage	—	1–1	1−0	
2	Figueirense	3	1	1	1	3	3	0	4			—		2–1
3	América Mineiro	3	1	1	1	2	2	0	4			1–0	—	
4	Atlético Mineiro	3	0	1	2	2	5	−3	1		0−2		1–1	—

Source: Primeira Liga – Tabela
Rules for classification: 1) points; 2) goal difference; 3) goals scored; 4) away goals scored; 5) drawing of lots.

Win Draw Loss

27 January 2016 1	Atlético Mineiro	0–2	Flamengo	Belo Horizonte, Minas Gerais
21:45 (UTC−2)	Tiago (yellow card) 71'	Report	Guerrero 68', 88'	Stadium: Mineirão; Attendance: 30,378; Referee: Héber Roberto Lopes

6 February 2016 2	Figueirense	2–1	Atlético Mineiro	Florianópolis, Santa Catarina
17:00 (UTC−2)	Dudu 13' (pen.) (yellow card) 90+2'; Gabriel Esteves 54'	Report	Eduardo 37'; Jesiel (yellow card) 62'; Carlos César (yellow card) 78'	Stadium: Orlando Scarpelli; Attendance: 3,062; Referee: Leandro Vuaden

2 March 2016 3	Atlético Mineiro	1–1	América Mineiro	Belo Horizonte, Minas Gerais
19:30 (UTC−2)	Dátolo 62'; Eduardo (yellow card) 65'; Tiago (yellow card) 22' (yellow-red card) 77'	Report	Rafael Bastos (yellow card) 65' (goal) 69'; Jonas (yellow card) 77'; Tony (yellow card) 86'	Stadium: Mineirão; Attendance: 6,403; Referee: Arilson Bispo da Anunciação

=== Campeonato Mineiro ===
==== First stage ====
Pos	Team	Pld	W	D	L	GF	GA	GD	Pts	Qualification or relegation
1	Cruzeiro	11	9	2	0	18	6	+12	29	Knockout stage
2	Atlético Mineiro	11	6	2	3	25	11	+14	20	Knockout stage
3	URT	11	5	4	2	10	8	+2	19	Knockout stage
4	América Mineiro	11	5	3	3	14	11	+3	18	Knockout stage
5	Caldense	11	4	2	5	12	12	0	14	

Updated to match(es) played on 10 April 2016. Source: FMF
Rules for classification: 1) points; 2) wins; 3) goal difference; 4) goals scored; 5) head-to-head results; 6) least red cards received; 7) least yellow cards received; 8) draw.

Win Draw Loss

31 January 2016 1	Uberlândia	0–1	Atlético Mineiro	Uberlândia
19:30 (UTC−2)	Mikael (yellow card) 17'; Thiago Braga (yellow card) 68'	Report	Leandro Donizete (yellow card) 19'; Leonardo Silva 86'	Stadium: Parque do Sabiá; Attendance: 14,673; Referee: Emerson de Almeida Ferreira

10 February 2016 2	Atlético Mineiro	2–0	Caldense	Belo Horizonte
21:45 (UTC−2)	Leonardo Silva 42'; Pratto 59'	Report	Gilson (yellow card) 36'; Marcel (yellow card) 70'; Marcinho (yellow card) 83'; Rafael Estevam (yellow card) 89'	Stadium: Independência; Attendance: 8,293; Referee: Ronei Cândido Alves

13 February 2016 3	Guarani	0–0	Atlético Mineiro	Divinópolis
17:00 (UTC−2)	Murilo (yellow card) 10'; Felipe Cordeiro (yellow card) 12'; Carlos (yellow card) 45'	Report	Henrique (yellow card) 59'; Gabriel (yellow card) 63'	Stadium: Farião; Attendance: 4,181; Referee: Gabriel Murta Barbosa Maciel

21 February 2016 4	Atlético Mineiro	5–1	Boa Esporte	Belo Horizonte
17:00 (UTC−3)	Júnior Urso 16'; Eduardo 22'; Luan 62' (pen.), 89'; Edcarlos (yellow card) 84'; Dodô 88'	Report	Léo Baiano (yellow card) 61'; Júnior Lopes (yellow card) 64'; Sillas 79'	Stadium: Independência; Attendance: 11,407; Referee: Jerferson Antônio da Costa

27 February 2016 5	URT	1–0	Atlético Mineiro	Patos de Minas
17:00 (UTC−3)	Rodrigo Possebon (yellow card) 15'; Ramos (yellow card) 30'; Carlos (yellow card) 42'; Alex (yellow card) 46'; Fábio 70'; Follmann (yellow card) 90+2'	Report	Júnior Urso (yellow card) 36'; Lucas Cândido (yellow card) 44'; Edcarlos (yellow card) 65'; Eduardo (yellow card) 69'; Pablo (yellow card) 86'	Stadium: Bernardo Rubinger de Queiroz; Attendance: 6,446; Referee: Cleisson Veloso Pereira

6 March 2016 6	Atlético Mineiro	4–1	Tombense	Belo Horizonte
16:00 (UTC−3)	Dátolo (yellow card) 53'; Luan 55'; Robinho 57', 69', 90+3'	Report	Wellington (yellow card) 37'; Paulo 77'	Stadium: Independência; Attendance: 17,424; Referee: Ricardo Marques Ribeiro

12 March 2016 7	América Mineiro	1–1	Atlético Mineiro	Belo Horizonte
16:00 (UTC−3)	Vitinho 33'; Ernandes (yellow card) 46'; João Ricardo (yellow card) 51'; Leandro Guerreiro (yellow card) 59'; Artur (yellow card) 59'; Adalberto (yellow card) 88'	Report	Cazares (yellow card) 24'; Hyuri (yellow card) 33'; Carlos César (yellow card) 55'; Clayton 60'; Eduardo (yellow card) 67'	Stadium: Independência; Attendance: 6,305; Referee: Ronei Cândido Alves

20 March 2016 8	Tupi	0–3	Atlético Mineiro	Juiz de Fora
18:30 (UTC−3)	Rafael Jataí (yellow card) 45'	Report	Pratto 15' (yellow card) 21'; Rafael Carioca (yellow card) 27'; Robinho 81', 90+5'; Tiago (yellow card) 66'	Stadium: Mário Helênio; Attendance: 5,846; Referee: Marco Aurélio Augusto Fazekas Ferreira

27 March 2016 9	Atlético Mineiro	0–1	Cruzeiro	Belo Horizonte
16:00 (UTC−3)	Marcos Rocha (yellow card) 1'; Leonardo Silva (yellow card) 44'; Pratto (yellow card) 45+1'	Report	Allano (yellow card) 1'; Manoel (yellow card) 41'; Gino (yellow card) 50'; Sánchez Miño (yellow card) 64'; Rafael Silva 73'	Stadium: Independência; Attendance: 15,842; Referee: Emerson de Almeida Ferreira

2 April 2016 10	Villa Nova	2–7	Atlético Mineiro	Belo Horizonte
16:00 (UTC−3)	Thiago (yellow card) 42'; Soares 51' (yellow card) 62'; Mancini 53' (pen.)	Report	Júnior Urso 1'; Robinho 21', 27', 55'; Clayton (yellow card) 29'; Rafael Morisco 43' (o.g.); Pratto 63' (pen.), 83' (yellow card) 67'; Leandro Donizete (yellow card) 78'	Stadium: Mineirão; Attendance: 17,019; Referee: Igor Júnio Benevenuto

10 April 2016 11	Atlético Mineiro	2–4	Tricordiano	Belo Horizonte
16:00 (UTC−3)	Cazares 26' (pen.); Pablo (yellow card) 43'; Leandro Donizete (yellow card) 46'; Victor (yellow card) 65'; Robinho 90+4'	Report	Márcio Gomes 33'; Júnio 47' (pen.); Antônio Marcos 53'; Marcos (yellow card) 90+3'; Arnold 90+5' (yellow card) 90+5'	Stadium: Independência; Attendance: 7,662; Referee: Felipe Fernandes de Lima

==== Knockout stage ====
Win Draw Loss

===== Semi-finals =====
17 April 2016 First leg	URT	2–2	Atlético Mineiro	Patos de Minas
16:00 (UTC−3)	Jonathan 4'; Ramos 56' (yellow card) 60'	Report	Rafael Carioca (yellow card) 33'; Douglas Santos 18'; Clayton 75'; Dátolo (yellow card) 87'	Stadium: Bernardo Rubinger de Queiroz; Attendance: 4,391; Referee: Ricardo Marques Ribeiro

23 April 2016 Second leg	Atlético Mineiro	2–0 (4–2 agg.)	URT	Belo Horizonte
16:00 (UTC−3)	Pratto 71'; Leonardo Silva (yellow card) 76'; Erazo (yellow card) 84'; Leandro Donizete (yellow card) 87'; Rafael Carioca 90+1'	Report	Marcos Antônio (yellow card) 36'; Carlos (yellow card) 45+1'; Mauro (yellow card) 79'	Stadium: Independência; Attendance: 16,111; Referee: Ricardo Marques Ribeiro

===== Finals =====
1 May 2016 First leg	América Mineiro	2–1	Atlético Mineiro	Belo Horizonte
16:00 (UTC−3)	Danilo 33', 51'; Alison (yellow card) 69'	Report	Pratto 90+3'	Stadium: Mineirão; Attendance: 7,188; Referee: Dewson Fernando Freitas da Silva

8 May 2016 Second leg	Atlético Mineiro	1–1 (2–3 agg.)	América Mineiro	Belo Horizonte
16:00 (UTC−3)	Tiago (yellow card) 33' (yellow-red card) 44'; Clayton 68'	Report	Osman (yellow card) 51'; Suéliton (yellow card) 66'; Alison (yellow card) 68' (yellow-red card) 81'; Danilo 83' (yellow card) 84'	Stadium: Mineirão; Attendance: 47,928; Referee: Wilton Pereira Sampaio

=== Copa Libertadores ===
==== Group stage ====
Pos	Team	Pld	W	D	L	GF	GA	GD	Pts	Qualification
1	(Brazil) Atlético Mineiro (A)	6	4	1	1	12	4	+8	13	Final stages
2	(Ecuador) Independiente del Valle (A)	6	3	2	1	7	4	+3	11	Final stages
3	(Chile) Colo-Colo	6	2	3	1	4	5	−1	9	
4	(Peru) Melgar	6	0	0	6	2	12	−10	0	

Source: CONMEBOL
Rules for classification: 1) points; 2) goal difference; 3) goals scored; 4) away goals scored; 5) drawing of lots.
(A) Advanced to the round of 16

Win Draw Loss

17 February 2016 1	Melgar (Peru)	1–2	(Brazil) Atlético Mineiro	Arequipa, Peru
18:45 UTC−5	O. Fernández 14'; Santamaría (yellow card) 41'; Quina (yellow card) 42'	Report	Rafael Carioca 20'; Patric 38'; Hyuri (yellow card) 68'; Leandro Donizete (yellow card) 79'	Stadium: Monumental de la UNSA; Attendance: 30,000; Referee: Wilson Lamouroux (Colombia)

24 February 2016 2	Atlético Mineiro (Brazil)	1–0	(Ecuador) Independiente del Valle	Belo Horizonte, Brazil
21:45 UTC−3	Pratto 3' (yellow card) 51'; Leonardo Silva (yellow card) 6'; Marcos Rocha (yellow card) 43'; Leandro Donizete (yellow card) 58'	Report	Ayala (yellow card) 43'; Orejuela (yellow card) 48'; Mina (yellow card) 72'	Stadium: Independência; Attendance: 20,851; Referee: Fernando Rapallini (Argentina)

10 March 2016 3	Colo-Colo (Chile)	0–0	(Brazil) Atlético Mineiro	Santiago, Chile
21:45 UTC−3	Valdés (yellow card) 39'; Beausejour (yellow card) 56'	Report	Rafael Carioca (yellow card) 53'; Leonardo Silva (yellow card) 61'; Leandro Donizete (yellow card) 71'	Stadium: Estadio Monumental David Arellano; Attendance: 38,000; Referee: Gery Vargas (Bolivia)

16 March 2016 4	Atlético Mineiro (Brazil)	3–0	(Chile) Colo-Colo	Belo Horizonte, Brazil
21:45 UTC−3	Cazares 1'; Rafael Carioca (yellow card) 20'; Patric 45'; Luan (yellow card) 68'; Hyuri 72'	Report	Barroso (yellow card) 17'; Beausejour (yellow card) 44'; Pavez (yellow card) 74'	Stadium: Independência; Attendance: 21,201; Referee: Juan Soto (Venezuela)

6 April 2016 5	Independiente del Valle (Ecuador)	3–2	(Brazil) Atlético Mineiro	Sangolquí, Ecuador
19:45 UTC−5	B. Cabezas 5'; Sornoza 20', 39' (pen.)	Report	Júnior Urso 9'; Erazo (yellow card) 23'; Robinho (yellow card) 28'; Pratto 48' (pen.); Leonardo Silva (yellow card) 86'	Stadium: Rumiñahui; Referee: Darío Herrera (Argentina)

14 April 2016 6	Atlético Mineiro (Brazil)	4–0	(Peru) Melgar	Belo Horizonte, Brazil
19:30 UTC−3	Tiago 1'; Robinho 7'; Pratto 16' (pen.); Carlos 68'	Report		Stadium: Mineirão; Attendance: 36,081; Referee: Jesús Valenzuela (Venezuela)

==== Final stages ====
===== Round of 16 =====
Win Draw Loss

27 April 2016 First leg	Racing (Argentina)	0–0	(Brazil) Atlético Mineiro	Avellaneda, Argentina
19:30 UTC−3	Acuña (yellow card) 25'	Report	Leonardo Silva (yellow card) 7'; Rafael Carioca (yellow card) 24'; Júnior Urso (yellow card) 72'	Stadium: El Cilindro; Attendance: 28,000; Referee: Julio Quintana (Paraguay)

4 May 2016 Second leg	Atlético Mineiro (Brazil)	2–1 (2–1 agg.)	(Argentina) Racing	Belo Horizonte, Brazil
21:45 UTC−3	Carlos 15'; Leandro Donizete (yellow card) 20'; Rafael Carioca (yellow card) 29'; Pratto 71'; Júnior Urso (yellow card) 75'	Report	Lisandro 21' (pen.); Romero (yellow card) 29'; Gustavo Bou (yellow card) 61'; Acuña (yellow card) 75'	Stadium: Independência; Attendance: 20,170; Referee: Daniel Fedorczuk (Uruguay)

===== Quarter-finals =====
Win Draw Loss

11 May 2016 First leg	São Paulo (Brazil)	1–0	(Brazil) Atlético Mineiro	São Paulo, Brazil
21:45 UTC−3	Thiago Mendes (yellow card) 3'; Wesley (yellow card) 48'; Michel Bastos 78'	Report	Rafael Carioca (yellow card) 3'; Leonardo Silva (yellow card) 13'; Robinho (yellow card) 17'; Leandro Donizete (yellow card) 28'; Júnior Urso (yellow card) 45'; Marcos Rocha (yellow card) 62'; Patric (yellow card) 77'	Stadium: Morumbi; Attendance: 61,297; Referee: Wilmar Roldán (Colombia)

18 May 2016 Second leg	Atlético Mineiro (Brazil)	2–1 (2–2 (a) agg.)	(Brazil) São Paulo	Belo Horizonte, Brazil
21:45 UTC−3	Cazares 6'; Carlos 11'; Leandro Donizete (yellow card) 67' (yellow-red card) 90+4'; Leonardo Silva (yellow card) 72'	Report	Maicon 14' (yellow card) 38'; Michel Bastos (yellow card) 25'; Kelvin (yellow card) 88'	Stadium: Independência; Attendance: 21,337; Referee: Andrés Cunha (Uruguay)

=== Campeonato Brasileiro Série A ===
==== League table ====
Pos	Team	Pld	W	D	L	GF	GA	GD	Pts	Qualification or relegation
2	Santos	38	22	5	11	59	35	+24	71	Qualification for 2017 Copa Libertadores group stage
3	Flamengo	38	20	11	7	52	35	+17	71	Qualification for 2017 Copa Libertadores group stage
4	Atlético Mineiro	38	17	11	10	61	53	+8	62 (Note: The matchday 38 game between Chapecoense and Atlético Mineiro was cancelled after both teams declined to play following the Chapecoense team plane crash. Both teams received a double walkover (3–0 loss for each team).)	Qualification for 2017 Copa Libertadores group stage
5	Botafogo	38	17	8	13	43	39	+4	59	Qualification for 2017 Copa Libertadores first stage
6	Atlético Paranaense	38	17	6	15	38	32	+6	57	Qualification for 2017 Copa Libertadores first stage

Source: CBF
Rules for classification: 1) points; 2) wins; 3) goal difference; 4) goals scored; 5) head-to-head results; 6) least red cards received; 7) least yellow cards received; 8) draw.

==== Results summary ====
Overall								Home						Away					
Pld	W	D	L	GF	GA	GD	Pts	W	D	L	GF	GA	GD	W	D	L	GF	GA	GD
38	18	11	9	64	50	+14	65	13	3	3	39	20	+19	5	8	6	25	30	−5

Last updated: 11 December 2016.
Source: Competitive matches

==== Results by round ====
Round	1	2	3	4	5	6	7	8	9	10	11	12	13	14	15	16	17	18	19	20	21	22	23	24	25	26	27	28	29	30	31	32	33	34	35	36	37	38
Ground	H	A	H	A	H	A	H	A	H	H	A	H	A	A	H	A	H	A	H	A	H	A	H	A	H	A	H	A	A	H	A	H	H	A	H	A	H	A
Result	W	D	L	D	D	D	L	L	W	W	W	W	D	L	W	W	W	W	W	L	W	D	W	L	W	D	W	W	D	W	L	W	D	L	D	D	L	C
Position	6	4	14	11	12	14	17	18	14	12	8	7	9	10	9	6	6	4	4	6	4	4	4	6	4	4	4	4	4	4	4	4	4	4	4	4	4	4

Updated to match(es) played on 11 December 2016. Source: Competitive matches
A = Away; H = Home; W = Win; D = Draw; L = Loss; C = Cancelled

==== Matches ====
Win Draw Loss

14 May 2016 1	Atlético Mineiro	1–0	Santos	Belo Horizonte, Minas Gerais
18:30 (UTC−3)	Cazares 14' (yellow card) 34'; Carlos Eduardo (yellow card) 55'	Report	David Braz (yellow card) 51'; Gustavo Henrique (yellow card) 62'	Stadium: Independência; Attendance: 4,889; Referee: Jailson Macedo Freitas (Bahia)

22 May 2016 2	Atlético Paranaense	1–1	Atlético Mineiro	Curitiba, Paraná
11:00 (UTC−3)	André Lima 9'; Eduardo (yellow card) 40'; Hernani (yellow card) 64'; Pablo (yellow card) 68'	Report	Eduardo (yellow card) 30'; Cazares 76'	Stadium: Arena da Baixada; Attendance: 11,804; Referee: Flávio Rodrigues de Souza (São Paulo)

26 May 2016 3	Atlético Mineiro	0–3	Grêmio	Belo Horizonte, Minas Gerais
21:00 (UTC−3)	Pablo (yellow card) 75'	Report	Marcelo Oliveira 17' (yellow card) 33'; Luan 26', 45+2' (yellow card) 44'; Douglas (yellow card) 49'; Marcelo Hermes (yellow card) 69'; Maicon (yellow card) 83'	Stadium: Independência; Attendance: 16,068; Referee: Raphael Claus (São Paulo)

29 May 2016 4	Vitória	1–1	Atlético Mineiro	Salvador, Bahia
16:00 (UTC−3)	Diego Renan (yellow card) 12'; Maicon Silva (yellow card) 35'; Maurício (yellow card) 53'; Willian Farias (yellow card) 75'; Kieza 78'	Report	Rafael Carioca (yellow card) 20'; Lucas Cândido (yellow card) 33'; Patric 36'; Carlos (yellow card) 58'; Edcarlos (yellow card) 69'; Capixaba (yellow card) 87'; João Figueiredo (yellow card) 90'	Stadium: Fonte Nova; Attendance: 12,791; Referee: Rodolpho Toski Marques (Paraná)

1 June 2016 5	Atlético Mineiro	1–1	Fluminense	Belo Horizonte, Minas Gerais
21:45 (UTC−3)	Tiago 2'; Leandro Donizete (yellow card) 26'; Patric (yellow card) 43'	Report	Gustavo Scarpa 30'; Edson (yellow card) 45+1'; Cícero (yellow card) 46'; Douglas (yellow card) 59'; Fred (yellow card) 74'; Giovanni (yellow card) 75'	Stadium: Independência; Attendance: 7,116; Referee: Luiz Flávio de Oliveira (São Paulo)

5 June 2016 6	Sport	4–4	Atlético Mineiro	Recife, Pernambuco
16:00 (UTC−3)	Rithely 25'; Gabriel Xavier 44'; Samuel Xavier (yellow card) 45+1'; Edmílson 73'; Diego Souza 76'	Report	Júnior Urso 21' (yellow card) 22'; Robinho 29' (pen.), 45+2' (pen.); Patric 41'; Gabriel (yellow card) 74'; Marcos Rocha (yellow card) 78'	Stadium: Ilha do Retiro; Attendance: 12,916; Referee: Rodrigo Nunes de Sá (Rio de Janeiro)

12 June 2016 7	Atlético Mineiro	2–3	Cruzeiro	Belo Horizonte, Minas Gerais
16:00 (UTC−3)	Robinho (yellow card) 5'; Rafael Carioca 13'; Fred 56' (yellow card) 57'; Marcos Rocha (red card) 57'; Clayton (yellow card) 73'; Gabriel (yellow card) 90+1'	Report	Lucas (yellow card) 12' (yellow-red card) 78'; Bruno Viana (yellow card) 18'; Alisson 19' (yellow card) 20'; Riascos 48'; Henrique (yellow card) 57'; Bryan (red card) 57'; Bruno Rodrigo 63'; Fábio (yellow card) 75'; Fabrício Bruno (yellow card) 79'; Romero (red card) 90+3'	Stadium: Independência; Attendance: 19,484; Referee: Marcelo Aparecido de Souza (São Paulo)

16 June 2016 8	Internacional	2–0	Atlético Mineiro	Porto Alegre, Rio Grande do Sul
19:30 (UTC−3)	Eduardo Sasha 34'; Vitinho 75'; Paulão (yellow card) 56'; Aylon (yellow card) 90+1'	Report	Douglas Santos (yellow card) 39'	Stadium: Beira-Rio; Attendance: 21,881; Referee: Péricles Bassols (Pernambuco)

19 June 2016 9	Atlético Mineiro	3–0	Ponte Preta	Belo Horizonte, Minas Gerais
11:00 (UTC−3)	Leandro Donizete 23'; Cazares 28'; Carlos 84'	Report	Jeferson (yellow card) 18'	Stadium: Independência; Attendance: 15,404; Referee: Wagner Reway (Mato Grosso)

22 June 2016 10	Atlético Mineiro	2–1	Corinthians	Belo Horizonte, Minas Gerais
21:45 (UTC−3)	Erazo (yellow card) 6'; Marcos Rocha (yellow card) 61'; Fred 67'; Cazares 82'; Leandro Donizete (yellow card) 90'	Report	Pedro Henrique (yellow card) 74'; Lucca 89'	Stadium: Mineirão; Attendance: 32,939; Referee: Wilton Pereira Sampaio (Goiás)

26 June 2016 11	América Mineiro	0–1	Atlético Mineiro	Belo Horizonte, Minas Gerais
11:00 (UTC−3)	Danilo (yellow card) 64'; Adalberto (yellow card) 88'; Borges (yellow card)	Report	Robinho 3'; Clayton (yellow card) 28'; Marcos Rocha (yellow card) 74'; Leonardo Silva (yellow card)	Stadium: Independência; Attendance: 8,858; Referee: Anderson Daronco (Rio Grande do Sul)

30 June 2016 12	Atlético Mineiro	5–3	Botafogo	Belo Horizonte, Minas Gerais
21:00 (UTC−3)	Cazares 1', 77'; Robinho 45+1'; Fred 47'; Carlos 89'	Report	Sassá 72' (pen.); Núñez 88'; Bruno 90+1'	Stadium: Mineirão; Attendance: 36,129; Referee: Raphael Claus (São Paulo)

3 July 2016 13	Figueirense	1–1	Atlético Mineiro	Florianópolis, Santa Catarina
19:00 (UTC−3)	Ermel 52'; Werley (yellow card) 53'; Jocinei (yellow card) 54'; Yago (red card) 90+2'	Report	Leonardo Silva (yellow card) 6'; Fred 7' (red card) 58'; Eduardo (yellow card) 75'; Erazo (yellow card) 75'	Stadium: Orlando Scarpelli; Attendance: 5,226; Referee: Rafael Traci (Paraná)

9 July 2016 14	Flamengo	2–0	Atlético Mineiro	Brasília, Distrito Federal
16:30 (UTC−3)	Felipe Vizeu 12' 57'; Pará (yellow card) 69'	Summary	Erazo (yellow card) 17'; Robinho (yellow card) 30'; Carlos César Neves (yellow card) 66'; Carlos (yellow card) 70'	Stadium: Mané Garrincha; Attendance: 23,390; Referee: (Brazil) Marielson Alves Silva

18 July 2016 15	Atlético Mineiro	2–1	Coritiba	Belo Horizonte, Minas Gerais
20:00 (UTC−3)	Ronaldo Conceição (yellow card) 21'; Robinho 41' 85'; Eduardo (yellow card) 90+1'	Summary	Edinho (yellow card) 4'; Kazim-Richards (yellow card) 64'; Carlinhos 76'	Stadium: Estádio Independência; Attendance: 20,891; Referee: (Brazil) Leandro Vuaden

24 July 2016 16	Palmeiras	0–1	Atlético Mineiro	São Paulo, São Paulo
11:00 (UTC−3)	Tchê Tchê (yellow card) 2'	Summary	Carlos César Neves (yellow card) 56'; Leandro Donizete 60'; Rafael Carioca (yellow card) 65'	Stadium: Allianz Parque; Attendance: 39,400; Referee: (Brazil) Wagner do Nascimento Magalhaes

30 July 2016 17	Atlético Mineiro	3–0	Santa Cruz	Belo Horizonte, Minas Gerais
21:00 (UTC−3)	Robinho 22'; Leandro Donizete (yellow card) 24'; Fred 67'; Luan 71'	Summary	Derley (yellow card) 11'; Grafite (yellow card) 45+1'; Uillian Correia (yellow card) 73'	Stadium: Estádio Independência; Attendance: 16,804; Referee: (Brazil) Dewson Fernando Freitas da Silva

4 August 2016 18	São Paulo	1–2	Atlético Mineiro	São Paulo, São Paulo
19:30 (UTC−3)				Stadium: Morumbi

8 August 2016 19	Atlético Mineiro	3–1	Chapecoense	Belo Horizonte, Minas Gerais
20:00 (UTC−3)				Stadium: Estádio Independência

14 August 2016 20	Santos	3–0	Atlético Mineiro	Santos, São Paulo
16:00 (UTC−3)				Stadium: Vila Belmiro

21 August 2016 21	Atlético Mineiro	1–0	Atlético Paranaense	Belo Horizonte, Minas Gerais
11:00				Stadium: Estádio Independência

28 August 2016 22	Grêmio	1–1	Atlético Mineiro	Porto Alegre, Rio Grande do Sul
16:00				Stadium: Arena do Grêmio

7 September 2016 23	Atlético Mineiro	2–1	Vitória	Belo Horizonte, Minas Gerais
19:30				Stadium: Estádio Independência

12 September 2016 24	Fluminense	4–2	Atlético Mineiro	Mesquita, Rio de Janeiro Rio de Janeiro
20:00				Stadium: Giulite Coutinho

15 September 2016 25	Atlético Mineiro	1–0	Sport	Belo Horizonte, Minas Gerais
19:30				Stadium: Estádio Independência

18 September 2016 26	Cruzeiro	1–1	Atlético Mineiro	Belo Horizonte, Minas Gerais
16:00				Stadium: Mineirão

25 September 2016 27	Atlético Mineiro	3–1	Internacional	Belo Horizonte, Minas Gerais
18:30				Stadium: Estádio Independência

1 October 2016 28	Ponte Preta	1–2	Atlético Mineiro	Campinas, São Paulo
16:30				Stadium: Moisés Lucarelli

5 October 2016 29	Corinthians	0–0	Atlético Mineiro	São Paulo, São Paulo
21:00				Stadium: Arena Corinthians

13 October 2016 30	Atlético Mineiro	3–0	América Mineiro	Belo Horizonte, Minas Gerais
19:30				Stadium: Mineirão

16 October 2016 31	Botafogo	3–2	Atlético Mineiro	Ilha do Governador, Rio de Janeiro
17:00				Stadium: Luso-Brasileiro

23 October 2016 32	Atlético Mineiro	3–0	Figueirense	Belo Horizonte, Minas Gerais
19:30				Stadium: Estádio Independência

29 October 2016 33	Atlético Mineiro	2–2	Flamengo	Belo Horizonte, Minas Gerais
16:30				Stadium: Mineirão

6 November 2016 34	Coritiba	2–0	Atlético Mineiro	Curitiba, Paraná
19:30				Stadium: Couto Pereira

17 November 2016 35	Atlético Mineiro	1–1	Palmeiras	Belo Horizonte, Minas Gerais
21:00				Stadium: Estádio Independência

20 November 2016 36	Santa Cruz	3–3	Atlético Mineiro	Recife, Pernambuco
19:30				Stadium: Arruda

27 November 2016 37	Atlético Mineiro	1–2	São Paulo	Belo Horizonte, Minas Gerais
17:00				Stadium: Estádio Independência

11 December 2016 38	Chapecoense	Cancelled	Atlético Mineiro	Chapecó, Santa Catarina
17:00				Stadium: Arena Condá

Due to the air accident that occurred with the Chapecoense team, victimizing 71 people, the last match of the Brazilian Championship against Atlético Mineiro was canceled, giving a double victory by 3 x 0.

=== Copa do Brasil ===
Win Draw Loss

==== Round of 16 ====
24 August First leg	Atlético Mineiro	1–1	Ponte Preta	Belo Horizonte, Minas Gerais
21:45				Stadium: Mineirão

21 September Second leg	Ponte Preta	2–2 (3–a3 agg.)	Atlético Mineiro	Campinas, São Paulo
19:30				Stadium: Moisés Lucarelli

==== Quarterfinals ====
28 September First leg	Atlético Mineiro	1–0	Juventude	Belo Horizonte, Minas Gerais
19:30				Stadium: Mineirão

19 October Second leg	Juventude	1–0 (1–1 agg.) (2–4 p)	Atlético Mineiro	Caxias do Sul, Rio Grande do Sul
19:30				Stadium: Alfredo Jaconi

==== Semifinals ====
26 October First leg	Internacional	1–2	Atlético Mineiro	Porto Alegre, Rio Grande do Sul
21:45				Stadium: Beira-Rio

2 November Second leg	Atlético Mineiro	2–2 (4–3 agg.)	Internacional	Belo Horizonte, Minas Gerais
21:45				Stadium: Estádio Independência

==== Final ====
23 November First leg	Atlético Mineiro	1–3	Grêmio	Belo Horizonte, Minas Gerais
21:45				Stadium: Mineirão

7 December Second leg	Grêmio	1–1 (4–2 agg.)	Atlético Mineiro	Porto Alegre, Rio Grande do Sul
21:45				Stadium: Arena do Grêmio
