= 2018 Campeonato Mineiro =

104th season of Mineiro's top professional football league

Campeonato Mineiro
- Season: 2018
- Champions: Cruzeiro
- Relegated: Democrata; Uberlândia
- Matches played: 76
- Goals scored: 164 (2.16 per match)
- Top goalscorer: Aylon; Ricardo Oliveira (6 goals)
- Average attendance: 5 258,6

The 2018 Campeonato Mineiro was the 104th season of Mineiro's top professional football league. The competition began on January 17 and ended on April 8. Atlético was the defending champions but was beaten in the final by its longtime rival Cruzeiro, that conquered its 37th title and became the defending champions.

== Format ==
=== First stage ===
The 2018 Módulo I first stage was played by 12 clubs in a single round-robin, with all teams playing each other once. The eight best-placed teams qualified for the final stage and the last two teams were relegated to the 2019 Módulo II.

The league also selects Minas Gerais's representatives in the Campeonato Brasileiro Série D and the Copa do Brasil. The two best placed teams not already qualified to the 2018 seasons of the Série A, Série B or Série C, earns the spots to the 2018 Série D. The three best-placed teams qualify for the 2019 Copa do Brasil.

=== Knockout stage ===
The knockout stage was played between the 8 best-placed teams from the previous stage, with the quarterfinals played in a one-legged tie and the semifinals and finals played in a two-legged tie. The quarterfinals were played necessarily at the best-placed team's home. The first best-placed team played against the eighth best-placed, the second against the seventh and so on. In the semifinals, the best-placed team in the first stage in each contest have the right to choose whether to play its home game in the first or second leg. The best-placed team in the first stage of each contest could win it with two ties.

== Participating teams ==
| Team | Home city | Manager |
|---|---|---|
| América Mineiro | Belo Horizonte | Enderson Moreira |
| Atlético Mineiro | Belo Horizonte | Oswaldo de Oliveira |
| Boa Esporte | Varginha | Sidney Moraes |
| Caldense | Poços de Caldas | Roberto Fonseca |
| Cruzeiro | Belo Horizonte | Mano Menezes |
| Democrata | Governador Valadares | Gimar Estevam |
| Patrocinense | Patrocínio | Rogério Henrique |
| Tombense | Tombos | Ramon Menezes |
| Tupi | Juiz de Fora | Alexandre Barroso |
| Uberlândia | Uberlândia | Paulo Cézar Catanoce |
| URT | Patos de Minas | Rodrigo Santana |
| Villa Nova | Nova Lima | Ito Roque |

== First stage ==
| Pos | Team | Pld | W | D | L | GF | GA | GD | Pts | Qualification or relegation |
|---|---|---|---|---|---|---|---|---|---|---|
| 1 | Cruzeiro | 11 | 9 | 2 | 0 | 20 | 2 | +18 | 29 | Knockout stage |
| 2 | América Mineiro | 11 | 6 | 3 | 2 | 14 | 8 | +6 | 21 | Knockout stage |
| 3 | Atlético Mineiro | 11 | 5 | 3 | 3 | 14 | 7 | +7 | 18 | Knockout stage |
| 4 | Tupi | 11 | 5 | 1 | 5 | 19 | 16 | +3 | 16 | Knockout stage |
| 5 | Tombense | 11 | 4 | 3 | 4 | 8 | 7 | +1 | 15 | Knockout stage |
| 6 | URT | 11 | 4 | 3 | 4 | 12 | 13 | −1 | 15 | Knockout stage |
| 7 | Boa Esporte | 11 | 4 | 2 | 5 | 5 | 9 | −4 | 14 | Knockout stage |
| 8 | Patrocinense | 11 | 3 | 4 | 4 | 13 | 14 | −1 | 13 | Knockout stage |
| 9 | Caldense | 11 | 3 | 4 | 4 | 9 | 12 | −3 | 13 | |
| 10 | Villa Nova | 11 | 3 | 2 | 6 | 12 | 16 | −4 | 11 | |
| 11 | Democrata GV | 11 | 3 | 1 | 7 | 12 | 0 | +12 | 10 | 2019 Módulo II |
| 12 | Uberlândia | 11 | 3 | 0 | 8 | 9 | 18 | −9 | 9 | 2019 Módulo II |

Updated to match(es) played on 18 January 2018. Source:
Rules for classification: 1) points; 2) wins; 3) goal difference; 4) goals scored; 5) head-to-head results; 6) least red cards received; 7) least yellow cards received; 8) draw.

== Knockout stage ==
=== Bracket ===
Quarterfinals
A1 | Cruzeiro | 2
A2 | Patrocinense | 0
B1 | Tupi | 0 (4)
B2 | Tombense | 0 (2)
C1 | Atlético Mineiro | 1
C2 | URT | 0
D1 | América Mineiro | 1
D2 | Boa Esporte | 0

Semifinals
Cruzeiro | 1 | 2 | 3
Tupi | 0 | 1 | 1
Atlético Mineiro | 1 | 2 | 3
América Mineiro | 0 | 0 | 0

Finals
Cruzeiro | 1 | 2 | 3
Atlético Mineiro | 3 | 0 | 3

=== Quarterfinals ===
17 March 2018
16:00 UTC–3

| Cruzeiro | 2 - 0 | Patrocinense |
|---|---|---|
| 52', 64' Raniel | Report |

Mineirão, Belo Horizonte
Referee: Ronei Candido Alves (Brazil)

17 March 2018
17:00 UTC–3

| Tupi | 0 - 0 | Tombense |
|---|---|---|
| | Report |
Penalties
| Tchô (penalty scored); Kayser (penalty scored); Rodrigo Dias (penalty scored); Patrick (penalty scored) | 4–2 | (penalty missed) Everton Galdino; (penalty scored) Theo Kruger; (penalty missed) Natan; (penalty scored) Breno Evangelista |

Estádio Municipal Radialista Mário Helênio, Juiz de Fora
Referee: Ricardo Marques (Brazil)

17 March 2018
19:00 UTC–3

| América Mineiro | 1 - 0 | Boa Esporte |
|---|---|---|
| Moura 65' | Report |

Estádio Independência, Belo Horizonte
Referee: Emerson de Almeida Ferreira (Brazil)

18 March 2018
16:00 UTC–3

| Atlético Mineiro | 1 - 0 | URT |
|---|---|---|
| Santos 42' | Report |

Estádio Independência, Belo Horizonte
Referee: Jerferson Antonio da Costa (Brazil)

=== Semifinals ===
==== First leg ====
21 March 2018
21:45

| Tupi | 0 - 1 | Cruzeiro |
|---|---|---|
| | Report | Cabral 46' |

Estádio Municipal Radialista Mário Helênio, Juiz de Fora
Referee: Wanderson Alves de Souza (Brazil)

22 March 2018
20:00

| Atlético Mineiro | 1 - 0 | América Mineiro |
|---|---|---|
| Cazares 77' | Report |

Estádio Independência, Belo Horizonte
Referee: Igor Junio Benevenuto (Brazil)

==== Second leg ====
25 March 2018
11:00

| Cruzeiro | 2 - 1 | Tupi |
|---|---|---|
| Neves 17', 81' | Report | Vitor 20' |

Mineirão, Belo Horizonte
Referee: Wagner do Nascimento Magalhães (Brazil)

25 March 2018
16:00

| América Mineiro | 0 - 2 | Atlético Mineiro |
|---|---|---|
| | Report | Santos 52'; Elias 79' |

Estádio Independência, Belo Horizonte
Referee: Igor Junio Benevenuto (Brazil)

=== Finals ===
==== First leg ====
1 April 2018
16:00

| Atlético Mineiro | 3 - 1 | Cruzeiro |
|---|---|---|
| Oliveira 37', 45+1'; Adílson 42' | Report | De Arrascaeta 83' |

Estádio Independência, Belo Horizonte
Referee: Dewson Fernando Freitas da Silva (Brazil)

==== Second leg ====
8 April 2018
16:00

| Cruzeiro | 2 - 0 | Atlético Mineiro |
|---|---|---|
| De Arrascaeta 4'; Neves 53' |

Mineirão, Belo Horizonte

== Goalscorers ==
As of 8 April 2018

| Rank | Player | Club | Goals |
|---|---|---|---|
| 1 | (Brazil) Aylon | América | 6 |
| 1 | (Brazil) Ricardo Oliveira | Atlético Mineiro | 6 |
| 2 | (Brazil) Fernando Ribeiro Fernandes | Democrata | 5 |
| 2 | (Brazil) Rafinha | Cruzeiro | 5 |
| 2 | (Brazil) Renato Kayser | Tupi | 5 |
