= Juan Cazares =

Ecuadorian footballer (born 1992)

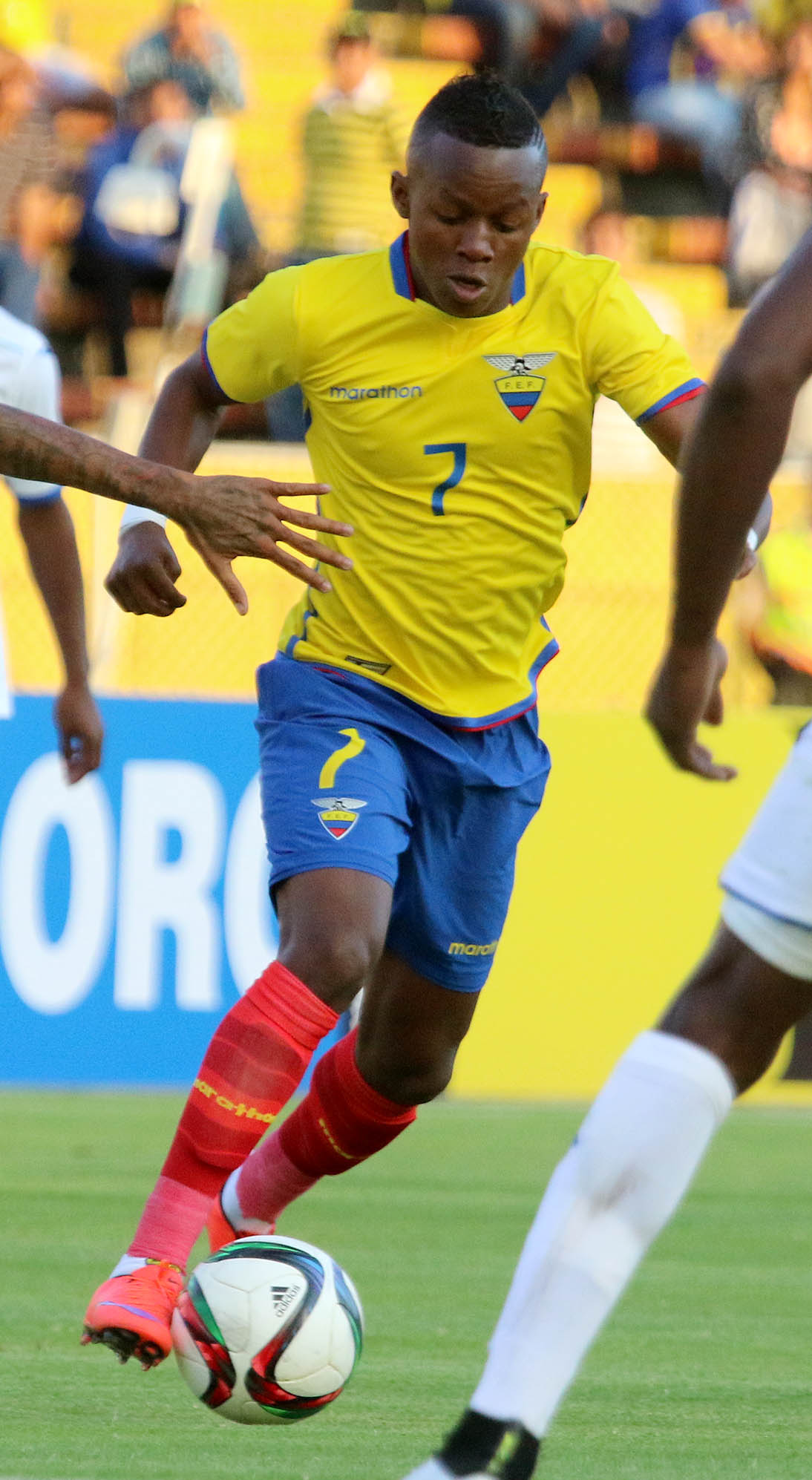
- Cazares playing for Ecuador in 2015

Personal information
- Full name: Juan Ramón Cazares Sevillano
- Date of birth: 3 April 1992 (age 34)
- Place of birth: Quinindé, Ecuador
- Height: 1.71 m (5 ft 7 1/2 in)
- Position: Attacking midfielder

Team information
- Current team: Independiente del Valle
- Number: 26

Youth career
- 2006–2008: Barcelona SC
- 2009: Norte América
- 2009–2011: Independiente del Valle
- 2010–2011: → River Plate (loan)

Senior career*
Years	Team	Apps	(Gls)
2009–2011	Independiente del Valle	9	(1)
2010–2011	→ River Plate (loan)	0	(0)
2011–2015	River Plate	2	(0)
2013	→ Barcelona SC (loan)	2	(0)
2013–2015	→ Banfield (loan)	76	(10)
2016–2020	Atlético Mineiro	148	(29)
2020–2021	Corinthians	23	(2)
2021	Fluminense	28	(1)
2022	Metalist Kharkiv	0	(0)
2022	→ Independiente (loan)	9	(1)
2022–2023	Independiente	24	(1)
2023	América Mineiro	12	(0)
2024	Santos	14	(1)
2024	Paysandu	12	(0)
2025-	Independiente del Valle	18	(3)

International career^{‡}
2011	Ecuador U20	11	(1)
2014–2021	Ecuador	22	(1)
- * Club domestic league appearances and goals as of 19 August 2025 ‡ National team caps and goals as of 26 January 2022

Juan Ramón Cazares Sevillano (born 3 April 1992) is an Ecuadorian footballer who plays as an attacking midfielder for Ecuadorian club Independiente del Valle.

== Club career ==
=== Early career ===
Born in Quinindé, Esmeraldas, Cazares moved to Guayaquil at early age and joined Barcelona's youth setup in 2006, aged 14. After being rarely used, he moved to Norte América in 2009, and subsequently joined Independiente José Terán later in the same year.

At Independiente, Cazares made his senior debut in 2009 Ecuadorian Serie B, appearing in nine matches and scoring one goal on 6 September, in a 4–0 home routing of Municipal Cañar.

=== River Plate ===
In January 2010, Cazares was loaned to River Plate. Initially assigned to the reserves, he impressed enough to secure a permanent contract in August of the following year. River paid Independiente US$ 500,000 for 50% of his rights, with a further one million in a future sale.

Cazares made his first team debut for River on 7 December 2011, coming on as a late substitute for goalscorer Chori Domínguez in a 1–0 Copa Argentina home win against Defensores de Belgrano; he became the first Ecuadorian to play for the club. In 2012, after establishing himself as a starter for the B-side, he won the 2012 U-20 Copa Libertadores and was also elected the tournament's best player.

Cazares was called up to train with the first team for ahead of the 2012–13 campaign by manager Matías Almeyda. He made his Primera División debut on 26 August 2012, replacing Manuel Lanzini in a 0–0 draw home draw against San Lorenzo.

Cazares was made a starter in the following matchday, a 1–1 draw at Colón on 2 September. After the sacking of Almeyda and the appointment of Ramón Díaz, he was not utilized by the club and subsequently placed in the loan list.

==== Barcelona (loan) ====
On 25 February 2013, Cazares was loaned to his first club Barcelona for six months. He made his debut for his childhood club on 10 March, coming on as an 80th-minute substitute for José Ayoví in a 1–0 home win against Macará.

Cazares only made one further appearance for Barcelona, starting in a 1–2 loss at El Nacional on 21 April 2013, before returning to River in July.

==== Banfield (loan) ====
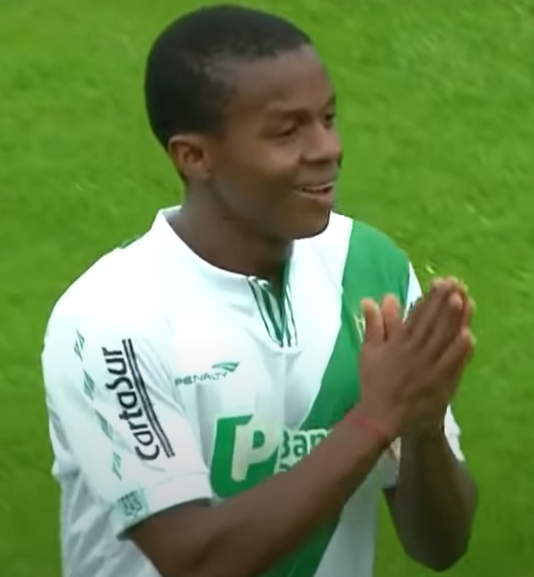
Cazares playing for Banfield in 2014

On 10 July 2013, Cazares was loaned to Primera B Nacional side Banfield for one year, reuniting with his former River manager Almeyda. He made his debut for the club on 5 August, starting in a 1–1 away draw against Almirante Brown.

Cazares scored his first goals abroad on 7 December 2013, netting a brace in a 4–2 home win against Unión de Santa Fe. He finished the season as an undisputed starter, scoring four goals in 38 appearances as his side achieved a top tier promotion as champions.

In July 2014, Cazares' loan was renewed for a further 18 months, with Banfield having a 1.5 million buyout clause for the remaining 50% of his rights (which belonged to Independiente). He scored his first goal in the main category of Argentine football on 24 August, netting the last in a 2–0 away success over San Lorenzo.

=== Atlético Mineiro ===
==== 2016 ====
On 27 December 2016, Cazares agreed to join Série A club Atlético Mineiro, who paid 1.5 million dollars for 50% of his rights directly to Independiente. Presented the following 4 January, he had to wait until 23 February to be registered due to bureaucratic problems involving his previous clubs.

Cazares made his debut for Galo on 24 February 2016, starting in a 1–0 home win against former club Independiente for the year's Copa Libertadores. He scored his first goal for the club on 17 March, in a 3–0 home success over Colo-Colo for the same competition.

Cazares also scored Atlético's first goal in 2016 Campeonato Brasileiro Série A, in a 1–0 win against Santos. Returning from the Copa América Centenario in June, he scored goals against both Ponte Preta (3–0 home win) and Corinthians (2–1 home win); late in the month, he scored a double in a 5–3 home success over Botafogo, taking his tally up to six goals in only six league matches.

After establishing himself as a starter, Cazares suffered a thigh injury, which kept him out for nearly a month. On 7 December 2016, during the 2016 Copa do Brasil Finals, he scored from his own half to equalize the second leg against Grêmio. The match, however, ended 1–1 and his side finished runners-up after a 3–1 defeat in the first leg.

Cazares finished the year with ten goals in all competitions, being the club's fourth top goalscorer (behind Robinho, Lucas Pratto and Fred, respectively) and the best in the midfield position.

==== 2017 ====
Cazares scored his first goal of 2017 on 27 April, in a 2017 Copa Libertadores 2–0 home victory against Paraguayan club Libertad. His first brace came on 4 May, in a 5–1 away victory against Bolivian club Sport Boys.

On 7 May, Cazares assisted the winning goal in a 2–1 victory against rivals Cruzeiro, winning the year's Mineiro, his first trophy with the club. Nine days later, he scored a brace against Godoy Cruz to win the home match 4–1, qualifying Atletico Mineiro in the top–spot of Group 6. On 18 June, Cazares scored a goal against giants São Paulo FC, winning their first match of the league 2–1.

Cazares scored his first Copa do Brasil goal of 2017 on 30 June, against Botafogo winning the first–leg match 1–0. On 2 July, he scored his first goal ever against club rivals Cruzeiro, winning 3–1.

=== Corinthians ===
On 26 September 2020, Cazares agreed to join Corinthians in a free transfer after he rescinded his contract with Atlético. He signed a nine-month contract with the club. After being regularly used during the remainder of the season, he lost his starting spot in the 2021 campaign, and terminated his contract on 14 April of that year.

=== Fluminense ===
On 15 April 2021, Cazares was loaned to Fluminense until December 2022. On 18 January 2022, he rescinded his link.

=== Metalist Kharkiv ===
On 22 January 2022, Cazares was announced at Ukrainian Premier League side Metalist Kharkiv.

=== Independiente ===
After the Russian invasion of Ukraine, FIFA allowed players to leave the country to remain active, and Cazares joined Independiente on loan on 4 April 2022. On 4 July, Independiente announced a permanent contract with the player until December 2023.

On 10 July 2023, Cazares left the Rojo.

=== América Mineiro ===
On 22 August 2023, Cazares returned to Brazil and signed a contract until the end of the year with América Mineiro in the top tier. He featured in 12 matches as the club suffered relegation.

=== Santos ===
On 4 January 2024, Cazares was announced at Santos, also relegated to the Série B, on a one-year deal. He made his debut for the club the following 20 January, replacing Giuliano in a 1–0 away win over Botafogo-SP.

Cazares scored his first goal for Peixe on 9 March 2024, netting the winner in a 3–2 home success over Inter de Limeira. On 28 June, after being nearly a month without appearing, he rescinded his contract with the club.

=== Paysandu ===
On 2 July 2024, Cazares was announced at Paysandu also in the Brazilian second division.

== International career ==
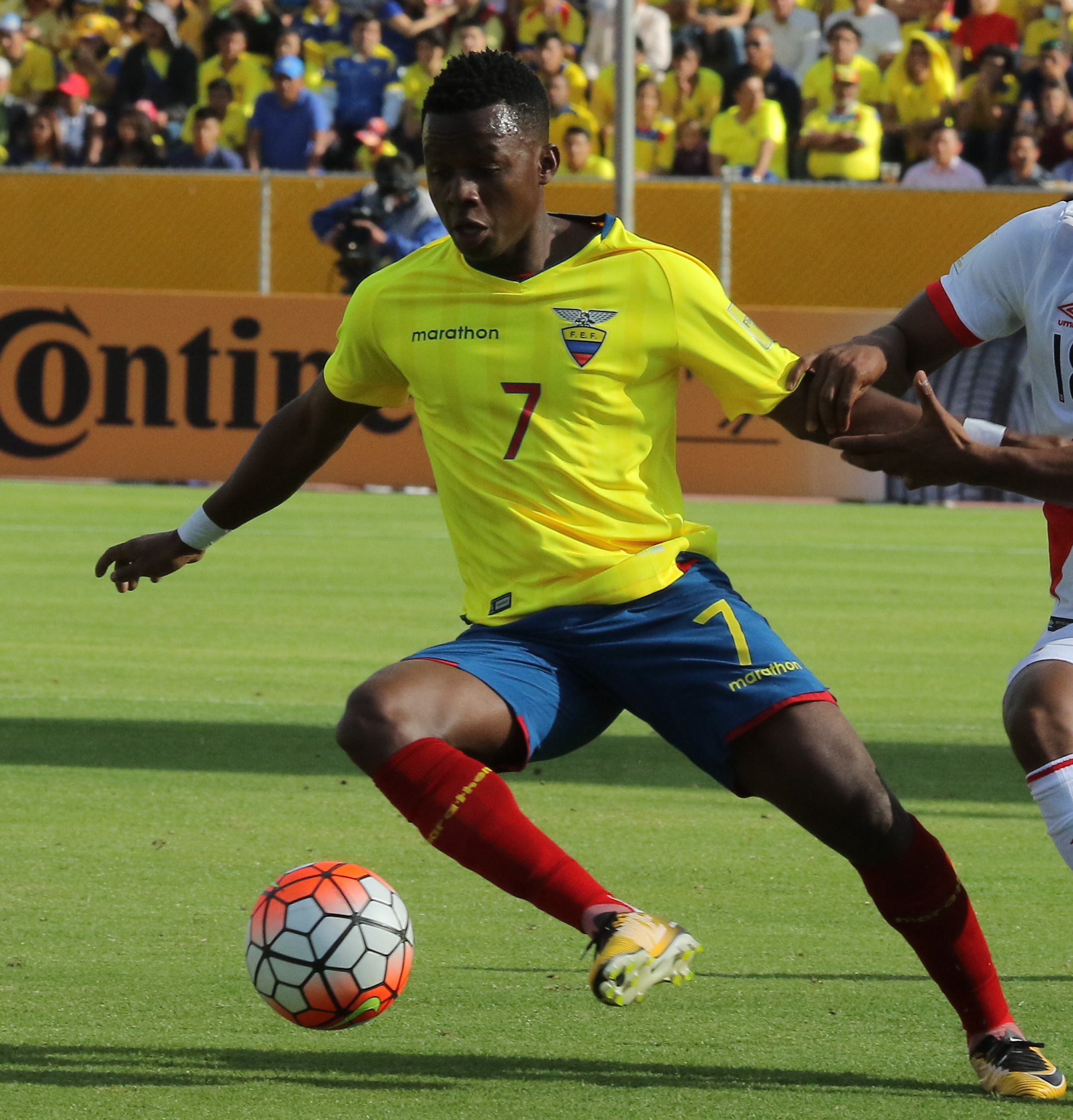
Cazares playing for the Ecuador national team in 2017

Cazares represented Ecuador under-20s in 2011 South American U-20 Championship and 2011 FIFA U-20 World Cup, scoring a goal against Colombia in the former tournament. On 6 September 2014 he made his debut for the full squad, starting and scoring the second in a 4–0 friendly win against Bolivia.

Cazares continued to appear regularly for the national team in the following years, being called up to 2015 Copa América and Copa América Centenario.

== Career statistics ==
=== Club ===
As of 12 June 2024.

Club	Season	League			Cup		Continental		State League		Other		Total	
Club	Season	Division	Apps	Goals	Apps	Goals	Apps	Goals	Apps	Goals	Apps	Goals	Apps	Goals
Independiente del Valle	2009	Ecuadorian Serie B	9	1	—		—		—		—		9	1
River Plate	2011–12	Primera B Nacional	0	0	4	0	—		—		—		4	0
River Plate	2012–13	Primera División	2	0	0	0	0	0	—		—		2	0
River Plate	Total		2	0	4	0	0	0	—		—		6	0
Barcelona SC (loan)	2013	Ecuadorian Serie A	2	0	—		0	0	—		—		2	0
Banfield (loan)	2013–14	Primera B Nacional	38	4	0	0	—		—		—		38	4
Banfield (loan)	2014	Primera División	10	3	2	1	0	0	—		—		12	4
Banfield (loan)	2015	Primera División	28	3	2	0	0	0	—		—		30	3
Banfield (loan)	Total		76	10	4	1	0	0	—		—		80	11
Atlético Mineiro	2016	Série A	17	6	7	1	7 (Note: Appearance(s) in Copa Libertadores)	2	8 (Note: Appearance(s) in Campeonato Mineiro)	1	1 (Note: Appearance(s) in Primeira Liga)	0	40	10
Atlético Mineiro	2017	Série A	30	3	4	1	8	5	14	0	4	0	60	9
Atlético Mineiro	2018	Série A	31	8	6	1	1 (Note: Appearance(s) in Copa Sudamericana)	0	13	2	—		51	11
Atlético Mineiro	2019	Série A	26	6	4	1	13 (Note: Eight appearances and one goal in Copa Libertadores, five appearances in Copa Sudamericana)	1	8	3	—		51	11
Atlético Mineiro	2020	Série A	0	0	0	0	0	0	1	0	—		1	0
Atlético Mineiro	Total		104	23	21	4	29	8	44	6	5	0	203	41
Corinthians	2020	Série A	20	2	2	0	—		—		—		22	2
Corinthians	2021	Série A	0	0	2	0	0	0	3 (Note: Appearance(s) in Campeonato Paulista)	0	—		5	0
Corinthians	Total		20	2	4	0	0	0	3	0	—		27	2
Fluminense	2021	Série A	22	1	—		9	0	6 (Note: Appearance(s) in Campeonato Carioca)	0	—		37	1
Independiente	2022	Primera División	19 (Note: Soccerway counts Copa de la Liga Profesional appearances as league appearances.)	2	1	1	2	0	—		—		22	3
Independiente	2023	Primera División	14	0	1	0	—		—		—		15	0
Independiente	Total		33	2	2	1	2	0	—		—		37	3
América Mineiro	2023	Série A	12	0	—		—		—		—		12	0
Santos	2024	Série B	3	0	—		—		11	1	—		14	1
Paysandu	2024	Série B	0	0	—		—		—		—		0	0
Career total			283	39	35	6	40	8	64	7	5	0	427	60

=== National team ===
As of 26 January 2022.

Ecuador national team
Year	Apps	Goals
2014	3	1
2015	8	0
2016	6	0
2017	4	0
2021	1	0
Total	22	1

=== International goals ===
#	Date	Venue	Opponent	Score	Final	Competition
1	6 September 2014	Lockhart Stadium, Fort Lauderdale, Florida, United States	Bolivia	2–0	4–0	Friendly

== Honours ==
=== Club ===
Banfield

- Primera B Nacional: 2013–14

Atlético Mineiro

- Campeonato Mineiro: 2017
