= Lucas Cândido =

Brazilian footballer (born 1993)

Personal information
- Full name: Lucas Cândido Silva
- Date of birth: 25 December 1993 (age 32)
- Place of birth: Uberlândia, Brazil
- Height: 1.86 m (6 ft 1 in)
- Position: Defensive midfielder

Team information
- Current team: Botafogo-PB
- Number: 28

Youth career
- 2009–2013: Atlético Mineiro

Senior career*
Years	Team	Apps	(Gls)
2013–2020	Atlético Mineiro	64	(2)
2019	→ Vitória (loan)	23	(2)
2020–2021	Vitória	24	(1)
2021–2022	Ponte Preta	16	(0)
2022–2023	Al Dhafra	26	(3)
2023–2024	Foolad	25	(1)
2025	Ponte Preta	26	(1)
2026	Caxias	7	(0)
2026–	Botafogo-PB	9	(2)

International career
2013	Brazil U-20	3	(0)
- * Club domestic league appearances and goals as of 8 November 2026

Lucas Cândido Silva (born 25 December 1993) is a Brazilian footballer who plays for Botafogo-PB. Mainly a defensive midfielder, he can also play as a left-back in either side.

== Honours ==
Atlético Mineiro

- Copa Libertadores: 2013
- Campeonato Mineiro: 2013, 2015, 2017
- Copa do Brasil: 2014
