= 2016 Campeonato Mineiro =

Campeonato Mineiro
- Season: 2016
- Champions: América
- Relegated: Guarani; Boa Esporte

The 2016 Campeonato Mineiro was the 102nd season of Mineiro's top professional football league. The competition began on January 31 and will end in May.

== Teams ==
- América
- Atlético Mineiro
- Boa Esporte
- Caldense
- Cruzeiro
- Guarani
- Tombense
- Tricordiano
- Tupi
- Uberlândia
- URT
- Villa Nova

== First stage ==
| Pos | Team | Pld | W | D | L | GF | GA | GD | Pts | Qualification or relegation |
|---|---|---|---|---|---|---|---|---|---|---|
| 1 | Cruzeiro | 11 | 9 | 2 | 0 | 18 | 6 | +12 | 29 | Knockout stage |
| 2 | Atlético Mineiro | 11 | 6 | 2 | 3 | 25 | 11 | +14 | 20 | Knockout stage |
| 3 | URT | 11 | 5 | 4 | 2 | 10 | 8 | +2 | 19 | Knockout stage |
| 4 | América Mineiro | 11 | 5 | 3 | 3 | 14 | 11 | +3 | 18 | Knockout stage |
| 5 | Caldense | 11 | 4 | 2 | 5 | 12 | 12 | 0 | 14 | |
| 6 | Villa Nova | 11 | 4 | 2 | 5 | 15 | 18 | −3 | 14 | |
| 7 | Tricordiano | 11 | 4 | 1 | 6 | 13 | 14 | −1 | 13 | |
| 8 | Tombense | 11 | 4 | 1 | 6 | 14 | 18 | −4 | 13 | |
| 9 | Tupi | 11 | 4 | 1 | 6 | 9 | 13 | −4 | 13 | |
| 10 | Uberlândia | 11 | 4 | 0 | 7 | 7 | 11 | −4 | 12 | |
| 11 | Guarani | 11 | 3 | 3 | 5 | 11 | 16 | −5 | 12 | 2017 Módulo II |
| 12 | Boa Esporte | 11 | 3 | 1 | 7 | 12 | 22 | −10 | 10 | 2017 Módulo II |

Updated to match(es) played on 10 April 2016. Source: FMF
Rules for classification: 1) points; 2) wins; 3) goal difference; 4) goals scored; 5) head-to-head results; 6) least red cards received; 7) least yellow cards received; 8) draw.

== Knockout stage ==
Semifinals
1 | Cruzeiro | 0 | 0 | 0
4 | América | 2 | 0 | 2
2 | Atlético Mineiro | 2 | 2 | 4
3 | URT | 2 | 0 | 2

Finals
1 | América | 2 | 1 | 3
2 | Atlético Mineiro | 1 | 1 | 2
