= Fábio Santos (footballer, born 1985) =

Brazilian footballer

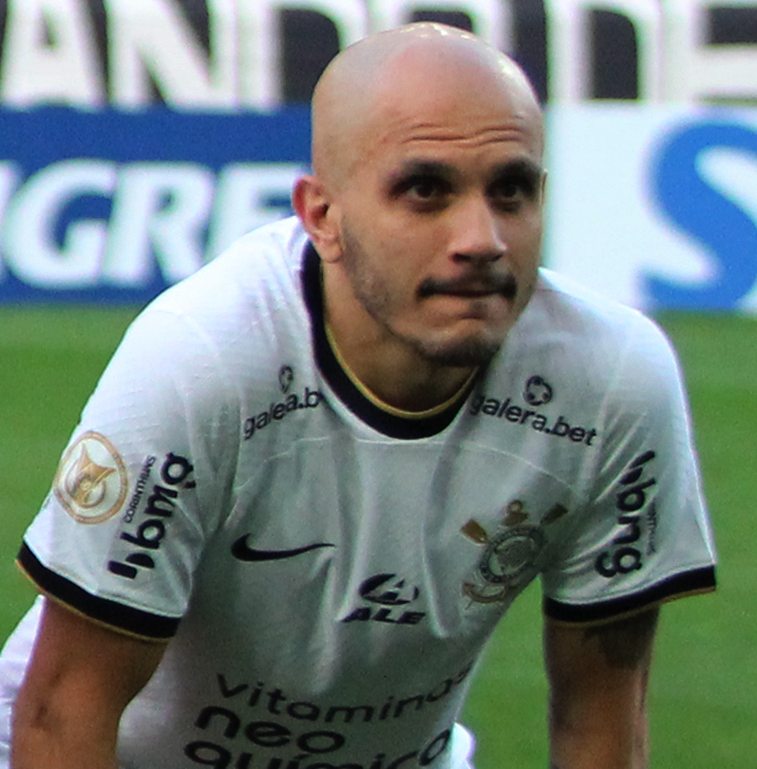
- Fábio Santos with Corinthians in 2022

Personal information
- Full name: Fábio Santos Romeu
- Date of birth: 16 September 1985 (age 41)
- Place of birth: São Paulo, Brazil
- Height: 1.76 m (5 ft 9 in)
- Position: Left back

Youth career
- 2001–2002: São Paulo

Senior career*
| Years | Team | Apps | (Gls) |
| 2003–2008 | São Paulo | 72 | (2) |
| 2006 | → Kashima Antlers (loan) | 20 | (3) |
| 2007 | → Cruzeiro (loan) | 13 | (0) |
| 2008 | → Monaco (loan) | 5 | (1) |
| 2008 | → Santos (loan) | 5 | (0) |
| 2009–2010 | Grêmio | 69 | (4) |
| 2011–2015 | Corinthians | 168 | (14) |
| 2015–2016 | Cruz Azul | 31 | (3) |
| 2016–2020 | Atlético Mineiro | 157 | (18) |
| 2020–2023 | Corinthians | 122 | (18) |

International career^{‡}
| 2005 | Brazil U-20 | | |
| 2012–2017 | Brazil | 4 | (0) |
- * Club domestic league appearances and goals as of 19:23, 9 December 2023 (UTC) ‡ National team caps and goals as of 25 January 2017

Fábio Santos Romeu (born 16 September 1985 in São Paulo), known simply as Fábio Santos, is a Brazilian former professional footballer who played as a left back.

Fábio Santos had a reputation for being a penalty kick specialist.

== Club career ==
=== São Paulo ===
Fábio Santos started his career for São Paulo as a youth player. He was promoted to first team in 2003 and feature in the major club's honours in this period, including the Copa Libertadores and FIFA Club World Cup. Despite his lack of playing time during this period, he out on loan to J1 League giants Kashima Antlers.

=== Loan years ===
He spend the 2006 season playing for Kashima Antlers, making 20 appearances and scoring three goals. In 2007, Fábio returned to Brazil to play for Cruzeiro, but failed to gain a spot in first team and was released in May. After that, he agreed a one-year loan deal with Ligue 1 side AS Monaco. In August 2008, he returned again to Brazil after failing to impress and signed a two-year contract with Santos.

=== Grêmio ===
Fábio Santos was released from Santos in December, and signed for Grêmio.

=== Corinthians ===
Fábio Santos was announced as Corinthians's player on 12 January 2011 and has come to be the bench player to Roberto Carlos's position. With Roberto Carlos's departure to Russian football, on early of 2011, Santos gained the position, becoming a key player in subsequent tournaments. He was a major part of the victories in the 2011 Campeonato Brasileiro Série A, 2012 Copa Libertadores, 2012 FIFA Club World Cup, 2013 Campeonato Paulista and 2013 Recopa Sudamericana.

=== Cruz Azul ===
On 18 June 2015, it was announced that Fábio Santos reached a deal with Mexican club Cruz Azul. The values of the transfer were undisclosed. During his time at Cruz Azul, he made 26 appearances scoring 3 goals. During his first season he had success playing most of the first season under manager Sergio Bueno. However, during his second season under new manager Tomas Boy, he had little playing time. Most of his appearances were coming off the bench. After Cruz Azul failed to qualify for the playoffs for the Clausura 2016 in the Liga MX, him along with other leftback Fausto Pinto, were told they were not going to continue to the next season.

=== Atletico Mineiro ===
On 14 June 2016, Fábio Santos joined Atlético Mineiro on a two-year contract. Later that year, he received the Bola de Prata award as the best left back of the 2016 Campeonato Brasileiro Série A. On 7 May 2017, he won his first trophy with the club after beating arch-rivals Cruzeiro in the 2017 Campeonato Mineiro final. On 4 March 2018, he made his 100th appearance for the club.

=== Return to Corinthians ===
On 19 October 2020, Fábio Santos returned to Corinthians on a free transfer.

== International career ==
He was capped for Brazil national Under-20 team to play for the 2005 FIFA World Youth Championship.

Fabio was placed in the preliminary squad for the 2008 Summer Olympics, but did not gain a place in the tournament's final squad by coach Dunga.

In September 2012, Fábio Santos was called up for Brazil national football team by Mano Menezes to Superclásico de las Américas, and on September 20, he debuted for Seleção in the 2–1 victory against Argentina, at Estádio Serra Dourada in Goiânia. On 11 November 2016, Fabio was called again by Tite.

== Career statistics ==
As of 9 December 2023

| Club | Season | League | | | State League | | National Cup | | Continental | | Other | | Total | |
| Club | Season | Division | Apps | Goals | Apps | Goals | Apps | Goals | Apps | Goals | Apps | Goals | Apps | Goals |
|---|---|---|---|---|---|---|---|---|---|---|---|---|---|---|
| São Paulo | 2003 | Série A | 13 | 0 | 0 | 0 | 0 | 0 | 6 (Note: Appearance(s) in Copa Sudamericana) | 0 | — | | 19 | 0 |
| São Paulo | 2004 | Série A | 27 | 1 | 8 | 0 | — | | 9 (Note: Eight appearances in Copa Libertadores, one appearance in Copa Sudamericana) | 0 | — | | 44 | 1 |
| São Paulo | 2005 | Série A | 13 | 1 | 4 | 0 | — | | 2 (Note: One appearance in Copa Libertadores, one appearance in Copa Sudamericana) | 0 | 0 | 0 | 19 | 1 |
| São Paulo | 2006 | Série A | 2 | 0 | 5 | 0 | — | | 0 | 0 | — | | 7 | 0 |
| São Paulo | Total | | 55 | 2 | 17 | 0 | 0 | 0 | 17 | 0 | 0 | 0 | 89 | 2 |
| Kashima Antlers (loan) | 2006 | J1 League | 20 | 3 | — | | 3 | 0 | — | | 4 | 0 | 27 | 3 |
| Cruzeiro (loan) | 2007 | Série A | 4 | 0 | 9 | 0 | 5 | 0 | — | | — | | 18 | 0 |
| Monaco (loan) | 2007–08 | Ligue 1 | 5 | 1 | — | | 0 | 0 | — | | 0 | 0 | 5 | 1 |
| Santos (loan) | 2008 | Série A | 5 | 0 | — | | — | | 0 | 0 | — | | 5 | 0 |
| Grêmio | 2009 | Série A | 20 | 1 | 11 | 1 | — | | 12 (Note: Appearance(s) in Copa Libertadores) | 1 | — | | 43 | 3 |
| Grêmio | 2010 | Série A | 23 | 1 | 15 | 1 | 4 | 0 | 2 | 0 | — | | 44 | 2 |
| Grêmio | Total | | 43 | 2 | 26 | 2 | 4 | 0 | 14 | 1 | — | | 87 | 5 |
| Corinthians | 2011 | Série A | 27 | 0 | 16 | 3 | — | | 1 | 0 | — | | 44 | 3 |
| Corinthians | 2012 | Série A | 29 | 1 | 14 | 0 | — | | 14 | 1 | 2 (Note: Appearance(s) in FIFA Club World Cup) | 0 | 59 | 2 |
| Corinthians | 2013 | Série A | 19 | 0 | 16 | 1 | 2 | 1 | 8 | 0 | 2 (Note: Appearance(s) in Recopa Sudamericana) | 0 | 47 | 2 |
| Corinthians | 2014 | Série A | 35 | 5 | 2 | 0 | 7 | 0 | — | | — | | 44 | 5 |
| Corinthians | 2015 | Série A | 6 | 1 | 4 | 2 | 0 | 0 | 4 | 0 | — | | 14 | 3 |
| Corinthians | Total | | 116 | 7 | 52 | 6 | 9 | 1 | 27 | 1 | 4 | 0 | 208 | 15 |
| Cruz Azul | 2015–16 | Liga MX | 28 | 3 | — | | 7 | 0 | — | | — | | 35 | 3 |
| Atlético Mineiro | 2016 | Série A | 20 | 0 | — | | 7 | 0 | — | | — | | 27 | 0 |
| Atlético Mineiro | 2017 | Série A | 34 | 5 | 14 | 0 | 8 | 0 | 8 | 0 | — | | 64 | 5 |
| Atlético Mineiro | 2018 | Série A | 32 | 4 | 12 | 2 | 7 | 0 | 1 | 0 | 4 (Note: Appearance(s) in Primeira Liga) | 0 | 56 | 6 |
| Atlético Mineiro | 2019 | Série A | 30 | 4 | 9 | 1 | 4 | 0 | 17 (Note: Ten appearances and one goal in Copa Libertadores, seven appearances and one goal in Copa Sudamericana) | 2 | — | | 60 | 7 |
| Atlético Mineiro | 2020 | Série A | 0 | 0 | 6 | 2 | 1 | 0 | 1 | 0 | — | | 8 | 2 |
| Atlético Mineiro | Total | | 116 | 13 | 41 | 5 | 27 | 0 | 27 | 2 | 4 | 0 | 215 | 20 |
| Corinthians | 2020 | Série A | 20 | 3 | — | | — | | — | | — | | 20 | 3 |
| Corinthians | 2021 | Série A | 32 | 3 | 5 | 2 | 2 | 0 | 5 | 0 | — | | 44 | 5 |
| Corinthians | 2022 | Série A | 22 | 3 | 5 | 2 | 6 | 0 | 8 | 0 | — | | 41 | 5 |
| Corinthians | 2023 | Série A | 25 | 4 | 13 | 1 | 8 | 0 | 9 | 0 | — | | 55 | 5 |
| Corinthians | Total | | 99 | 13 | 23 | 5 | 16 | 0 | 22 | 0 | — | | 160 | 18 |
| Career total | | | 491 | 44 | 168 | 18 | 71 | 1 | 107 | 4 | 12 | 0 | 848 | 67 |

=== International ===
As of 27 October 2021

Appearances and goals by national team and year
| National team | Year | Apps | Goals |
|---|---|---|---|
| Brazil | 2012 | 3 | 0 |
| Brazil | 2013 | 0 | 0 |
| Brazil | 2014 | 0 | 0 |
| Brazil | 2015 | 0 | 0 |
| Brazil | 2016 | 0 | 0 |
| Brazil | 2017 | 1 | 0 |
| Total | | 4 | 0 |

== Honours ==
=== Club ===
São Paulo

- Copa Libertadores: 2005
- FIFA Club World Cup: 2005

Grêmio

- Campeonato Gaúcho: 2010

Corinthians

- Campeonato Brasileiro Série A: 2011, 2015
- Copa Libertadores: 2012
- FIFA Club World Cup: 2012
- Campeonato Paulista: 2013
- Recopa Sudamericana: 2013

Atlético Mineiro

- Campeonato Mineiro: 2017

=== National team ===
Brazil

- Chile Octagonal Tournament: 2005
- Superclásico de las Américas: 2012
