= Thiago Braga =

Brazilian footballer (born 1984)

Personal information
- Full name: Thiago Braga de Souza
- Date of birth: May 4, 1984 (age 42)
- Place of birth: Belo Horizonte, Brazil
- Height: 1.84 m (6 ft 0 in)
- Position: Goalkeeper

Team information
- Current team: Pouso Alegre

Youth career
- 2004: Cruzeiro

Senior career*
Years	Team	Apps	(Gls)
2004–2005	Cruzeiro		
2005–2010	Ipatinga		
2011	Tupi		
2011–2015	Villa Nova	34	(0)
2016	Uberlândia	11	(0)
2016	ASA	19	(0)
2017	Uberlândia	11	(0)
2018	América-RN	12	(0)
2019	URT	0	(0)
2019–2023	Operário Ferroviário	49	(0)
2023	Villa Nova	9	(0)
2023–	Sampaio Corrêa	6	(0)
- * Club domestic league appearances and goals as of 11 November 2023

Thiago Braga de Souza or simply Thiago Braga (born May 4, 1984), is a Brazilian goalkeeper who plays for Pouso Alegre.

== Contract ==
- Ipatinga (Loan) 22 April 2006 to 31 December 2007
- Cruzeiro 21 April 2006 to 20 April 2008
