= Fred (footballer, born 1983) =

Brazilian footballer (born 1983)

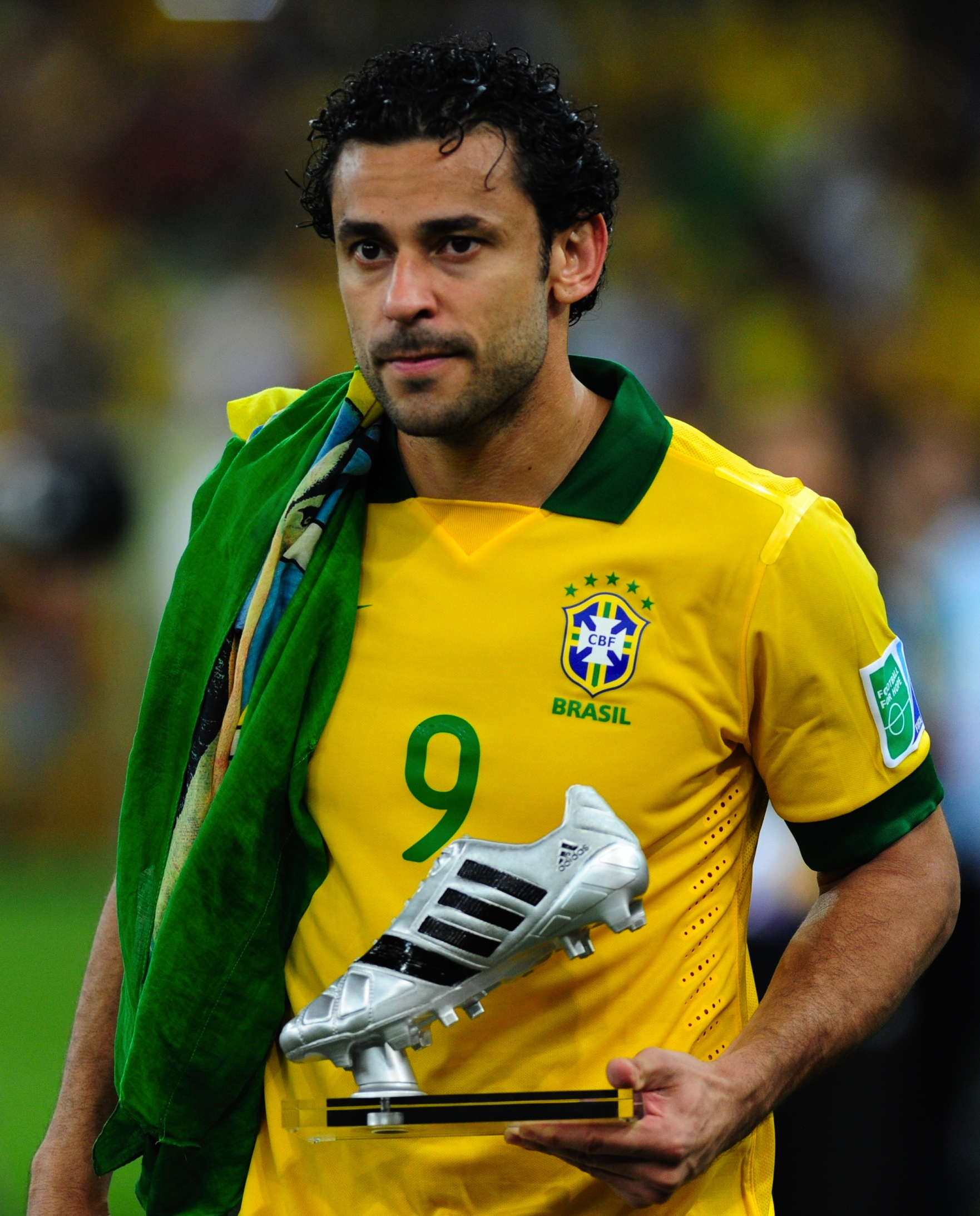
- Fred with Brazil at the 2013 FIFA Confederations Cup

Personal information
- Full name: Frederico Chaves Guedes
- Date of birth: 3 October 1983 (age 43)
- Place of birth: Teófilo Otoni, Minas Gerais, Brazil
- Height: 1.85 m (6 ft 1 in)
- Position: Striker

Youth career
- 2001–2003: América Mineiro

Senior career*
Years	Team	Apps	(Gls)
2003–2004	América Mineiro	54	(31)
2004–2005	Cruzeiro	56	(37)
2005–2009	Lyon	87	(34)
2009–2016	Fluminense	233	(142)
2016–2017	Atlético Mineiro	69	(34)
2018–2020	Cruzeiro	56	(21)
2020–2022	Fluminense	71	(17)
Total		626	(316)

International career
2005–2014	Brazil	39	(18)
Medal record
Men's Football
Representing Brazil
Copa America
Winner	2007 Venezuela
FIFA Confederations Cup
Winner	2013 Brazil
- * Club domestic league appearances and goals

Frederico Chaves Guedes (born 3 October 1983), known as Fred (Brazilian Portuguese: [ˈfɾɛdʒi]), is a Brazilian former professional footballer who played as a striker.

Fred began his career at América Mineiro before transferring to local rivals Cruzeiro in 2004. After two seasons there, he moved to Lyon of France in a protracted transfer saga, and won three consecutive Ligue 1 titles. From 2009 to 2016, Fred played for Fluminense, where he won two Campeonato Brasileiro Série A titles in two years (2010 and 2012) and the Campeonato Carioca (2012 – scoring in final), also being top scorer of the 2012 Serie A. In 2016, Fred signed for Atlético Mineiro. After returning to Cruzeiro in 2018 and Fluminense in 2020, Fred retired from the professional game in 2022. He made his international debut for Brazil in 2005 and was selected for the 2006 and 2014 editions of the FIFA World Cup, and was also part of their victories at the 2007 Copa América and the 2013 Confederations Cup.

Fred is the second-highest goalscorer in the history of Fluminense, with 199 goals across all competitions, as well as the all-time second-highest goalscorer of the Campeonato Brasileiro Série A, with 158. He also scored one of the fastest goals in professional football history while playing for América Mineiro, against Vila Nova during a Copa São Paulo de Juniores match. The goal was scored 3.17 seconds after the match started.

== Club career ==
=== Brazil and transfer saga ===
Fred spent one season as a professional at América Mineiro of Belo Horizonte before he left for their city rival Cruzeiro in middle of the 2004 season. As Feyenoord had an agreement with América, the Dutch club received Magrão from Cruzeiro, and retained 10% economic rights on Fred, and Fred himself held 15%.

After scoring 41 goals in 43 games for Cruzeiro in the 2005 season, Fred was signed by defending Ligue 1 champions Lyon for €15 million. (of which €3 million was received by Fred, 5% as a solidarity contribution, €1.4 million to Lyon's agent and €510,913 in Brazilian taxes). Feyenoord then claimed Cruzeiro's 10% of the transfer fee, as the club alleged the fee was €1.5 million instead of the €933,908.70 in Cruzeiro's viewpoint. The Dutch club sued to the Court of Arbitration for Sport and won.

=== Lyon ===
With 14 goals in his first season, Fred was the second-highest goalscorer in the 2005–06 Ligue 1 season, and won his first league title with Lyon.

Although he missed two months of the 2006–07 season, Fred still scored 11 goals in 20 games, and was the club's top scorer as Lyon defended their title. In September 2006 he scored goal against Real Madrid in the group stage of the UEFA Champions League after a long pass by Juninho, where he outstrengthed defender Fabio Cannavaro before chipping the ball over goalkeeper Iker Casillas and into the goal.

During the 2007–08 season, however, Fred was injured during a training session at the 2007 Copa América. He made his comeback in October 2007, but due to competition with new signing Milan Baroš and youth product Karim Benzema, Fred had limited first team opportunities.

In summer 2008 Fred was linked with a move to Bundesliga club Werder Bremen but it did not materialise. He played 15 games out of possible 20 for Lyon in the 2008–09 season. He played his last match for Lyon on 10 January 2009 after he requested to leave the club in December 2008. On 26 February 2009, he was released from his contract.

=== Fluminense ===
After being released from Lyon and refusing to return from Brazil, Fred signed a pre-contract with Brazilian club Fluminense, consequently agreeing to a five-year deal. He scored twice on his debut on 15 March 2009, as Fluminense beat Macaé 3–1. Fred helped Fluminense escape from relegation in 2009, after returning from an injury for 15 matches. In 2010, he was the leader of the Fluminense squad that won the 2010 Série A title, despite having missed 22 games.

Later in July 2011, he went on to break the record for most goals in the Brasileirao when he scored a brace against Bahia, taking his tally to 44 goals. On 16 November 2011, Fred scored poker (four goals) in a historic 5–4 victory against Gremio. Four days later, he scored a hat trick in a 4–0 victory against Figueirense, and finished the season second in the top scorer's chart with 22 goals. On 11 November 2012, Fred scored two goals in a 3–2 win over Palmeiras, clinching the 2012 Campeonato Brasileiro Série A for Fluminense and finishing as the league's top scorer and best player. Fred almost left the club after disagreements with head coach Levir Culpi in April 2016, but eventually remained.

=== Atlético Mineiro ===
On 8 June 2016, Atlético Mineiro club president Daniel Nepomuceno announced on his Twitter account that the club had signed Fred. The player agreed to a two-year deal with the club, according to its press representatives. Fred made his Atlético debut on 12 June 2016 in the Clássico Mineiro against rivals Cruzeiro. He scored and celebrated against his former club in a 2–3 defeat at the Estádio Independência. Fred was the top goalscorer of the 2016 Campeonato Brasileiro Série A, along with two other players, with 14 goals. He achieved the feat for the third time in his career, which is a record (also shared, with Romário, Túlio Maravilha and Dadá Maravilha).

=== Return to Cruzeiro ===
On 23 December 2017, Fred and Atlético agreed on the termination of his contract and on the same day it was announced his return to Cruzeiro, 12 years after originally leaving. He made his second debut for the club on 17 January 2018, in the season opening match against Tupi at the Mineirão in the Campeonato Mineiro, which ended in a 2–0 win for Cruzeiro.

=== Return to Fluminense ===
On 31 May 2020, Fred rejoined Fluminense on a two-year deal. In April 2022, he announced his decision to retire after struggling with diplopia and other physical issues. A last highlight was the winning of the 2022 Campeonato Carioca in the first half of the year, prevailing in the finals against Flamengo in April.

Fred scored his final goal for Fluminense in a Série A 4-0 win vs Corinthians on 2 July 2022 at the Maracanã. A week later, he played his final match for Fluminense on 9 July 2022, a Série A 2–1 win over Ceará at the same stadium.

Fred retired having scored 199 goals for Fluminense, good enough to be the second top goalscorer in Fluminense's history, only behind Waldo (319). According to the IFFHS, Moreno was the highest goalscoring Brazilian player in top divisions in the 21st century (307), and the third-highest South American, only behind Luis Suárez (409), and Lionel Messi (518).

== International career ==
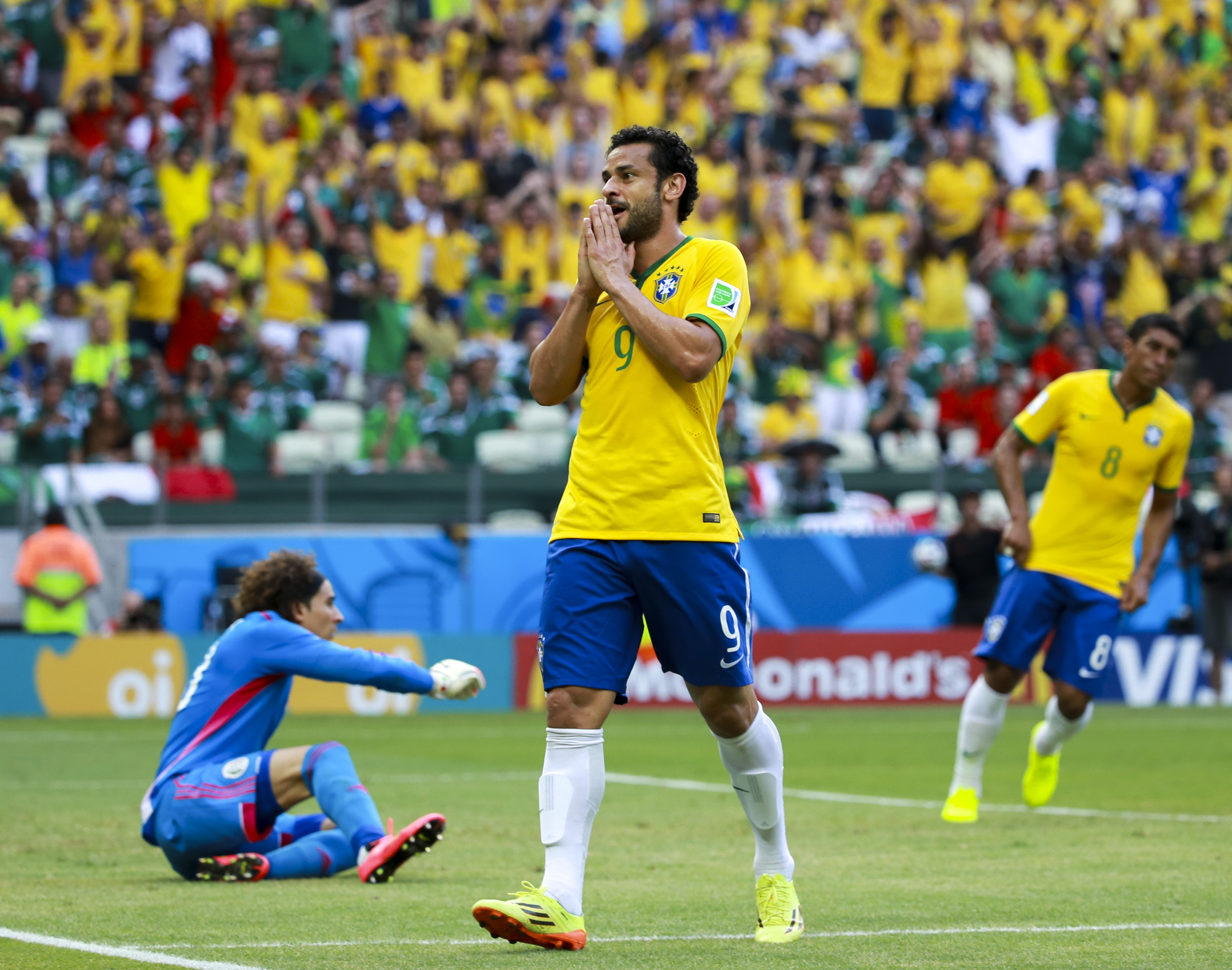
Fred missing an opportunity against Mexico at the 2014 FIFA World Cup

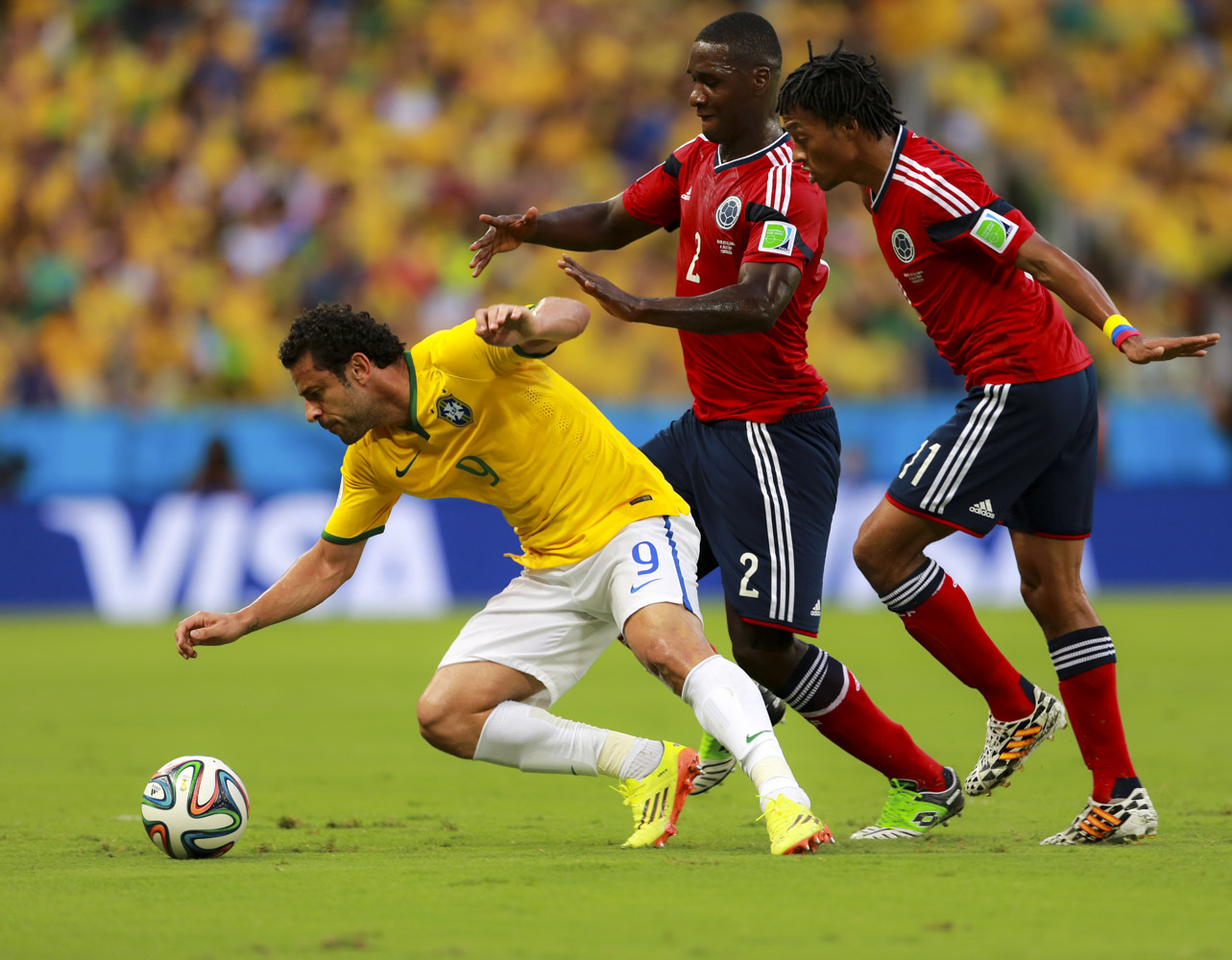
Fred and Colombia's players Cristián Zapata and Juan Cuadrado, in the quarter-finals of the 2014 FIFA World Cup

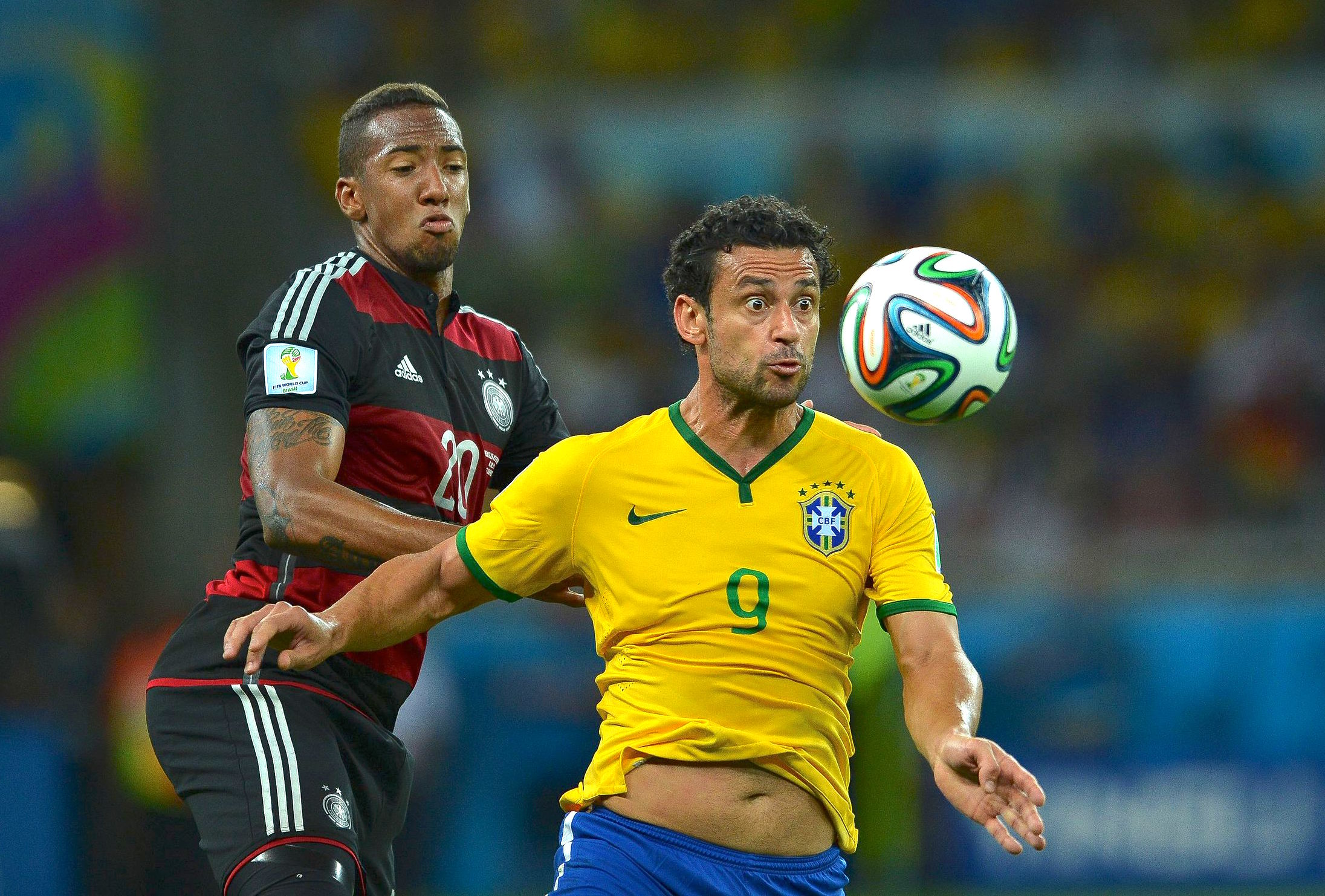
Fred and Jérôme Boateng in the 2014 World Cup semi-final between Brazil and Germany

Fred made his debut for Brazil as a late substitute in a friendly match against Guatemala on 27 April 2005. He scored his first two international goals on 12 November 2005 in an 8–0 friendly win against the United Arab Emirates.

Although he did not play during the qualifying campaign, Fred was named in Brazil's 2006 FIFA World Cup squad as a cover for strikers Ronaldo, Adriano and Robinho. After entering as a substitute, he scored in a 2–0 victory against Australia on 18 June when he tapped-in a shot from Robinho which had rebounded off the inside of goalkeeper Mark Schwarzer's near post in the 90th minute. The result put Brazil into the last 16 with a game to spare.

In the 2011 Copa América, Fred scored an 89th-minute equaliser against Paraguay in a 2–2 draw. In the quarter-finals, he was one of four Brazil players to miss in a 2–0 penalty shootout loss against the same opposition.

In 2013, Fred was established as Brazil's first-choice centre-forward by returning manager Luiz Felipe Scolari. On 6 February, Fred scored in a 2–1 defeat to England at Wembley Stadium, and went on to score in the return fixture, becoming the first player to score at the renovated Maracanã Stadium.

At the 2013 FIFA Confederations Cup, Fred was the joint top scorer of the tournament with five goals, and was awarded the Silver Shoe. On 22 June, he scored twice against Italy in a 4–2 group stage win. He later scored in a 2–1 semi-final victory over Uruguay, and capped his successful Confederations Cup campaign with two goals against Spain in the competition's final to help Brazil to a 3–0 victory.

In May 2014, Fred was named in Brazil's squad for the 2014 World Cup. In the opening match of the tournament, on 12 June against Croatia in São Paulo, Fred was fouled in the 69th minute, resulting in a controversial penalty which Neymar converted to make the score 2–1 ahead of an eventual 3–1 win. After receiving criticism for his performances in the opening two matches, Fred scored his only goal of the tournament in the final group match, a 4–1 victory over Cameroon which qualified the team for the round of 16. He managed just five shots on target at the tournament in six matches played. Fred's prolonged run of poor form saw the player receive hostile jeers from the home crowd whenever he touched the ball in the 7–1 defeat to Germany in Belo Horizonte. According to Opta Sports, Fred failed to make a single tackle, cross, run or interception during the match, and spent the most time in possession of the ball on the centre spot due to seven restarts and one kick-off. Following Brazil's 3–0 defeat to the Netherlands in the match for third place, Fred announced his retirement from international competition.

On 16 September 2014, it was reported that Fred came out of retirement after previously announcing retirement following the criticism he received during the 2014 World Cup. Despite his intention to return to the Seleção, Fred once again confirmed his international retirement the following year, and did not feature in a Brazil squad again.

== Personal life ==
Fred is a convert to Protestant Christianity.

== Career statistics ==
=== Club ===
Appearances and goals by club, season and competition
Club	Season	League			National cup		League cup		Continental		State League		Other		Total	
Club	Season	Division	Apps	Goals	Apps	Goals	Apps	Goals	Apps	Goals	Apps	Goals	Apps	Goals	Apps	Goals
América Mineiro	2003	Série B	19	7	—		—		—		12 (Note: Appearance(s) in Campeonato Mineiro)	10	—		31	17
América Mineiro	2004	Série B	7	2	3	2	—		—		16	12	—		26	16
América Mineiro	Total		26	9	3	2	—		—		28	22	—		57	33
Cruzeiro	2004	Série A	24	14	—		—		4 (Note: Appearance(s) in Copa Libertadores)	2	—		—		28	16
Cruzeiro	2005	Série A	19	10	9	14	—		—		13	13	—		41	37
Cruzeiro	Total		43	24	9	14	—		4	2	13	13	—		69	53
Lyon	2005–06	Ligue 1	31	14	4	1	1	0	9 (Note: Appearance(s) in UEFA Champions League)	2	—		—		45	17
Lyon	2006–07	Ligue 1	20	11	3	1	2	0	5	2	—		—		30	14
Lyon	2007–08	Ligue 1	21	7	4	1	2	0	3	0	—		—		30	8
Lyon	2008–09	Ligue 1	15	2	0	0	1	0	4	2	—		—		20	4
Lyon	Total		87	34	11	3	6	0	21	6	—		—		125	43
Fluminense	2009	Série A	20	12	6	2	—		6 (Note: Appearance(s) in Copa Sudamericana)	5	4 (Note: Appearance(s) in Campeonato Carioca)	3	—		36	22
Fluminense	2010	Série A	14	5	5	6	—		—		9	7	—		28	18
Fluminense	2011	Série A	25	22	—		—		5	2	13	10	—		43	34
Fluminense	2012	Série A	28	20	—		—		7	3	10	7	—		45	30
Fluminense	2013	Série A	9	3	2	0	—		7	3	7	2	—		25	8
Fluminense	2014	Série A	28	18	5	4	—		2	0	11	5	—		46	27
Fluminense	2015	Série A	23	9	5	2	—		—		14	11	—		42	22
Fluminense	2016	Série A	6	2	3	3	—		—		12	6	1 (Note: Appearance(s) in Primeira Liga)	0	22	11
Fluminense	Total		153	91	26	17	—		27	13	80	51	1	0	287	172
Atlético Mineiro	2016	Série A	28	12	—		—		—		—		—		28	12
Atlético Mineiro	2017	Série A	29	12	3	1	—		7	6	12	10	4	1	55	30
Atlético Mineiro	Total		57	24	3	1	—		7	6	12	10	4	1	83	42
Cruzeiro	2018	Série A	6	3	0	0	—		1	0	8	1	—		15	4
Cruzeiro	2019	Série A	30	5	6	0	–		6	4	12	12	–		54	21
Cruzeiro	Total		36	8	6	0	—		7	4	20	13	—		69	25
Fluminense	2020	Série A	24	5	1	0	—		0	0	3	0	—		28	5
Fluminense	2021	Série A	24	5	6	2	—		9	7	7	6	—		46	20
Fluminense	2022	Série A	6	1	2	1	—		5 (Note: One appearance in Copa Libertadores, four appearances in Copa Sudamericana)	0	7	0	—		20	2
Fluminense	Total		54	11	9	3	—		14	7	17	6	—		94	27
Career total			456	201	67	40	6	0	80	38	170	115	5	1	784	395

=== International ===
Appearances and goals by national team and year
National team	Year	Apps	Goals
Brazil	2005	2	2
Brazil	2006	5^{*}	2
Brazil	2007	2	0
Brazil	2008	0	0
Brazil	2009	0	0
Brazil	2010	0	0
Brazil	2011	9	2
Brazil	2012	1	1
Brazil	2013	11	9
Brazil	2014	9	2
Total		39	18

^{*}The match against Al Kuwait XI was not counted.

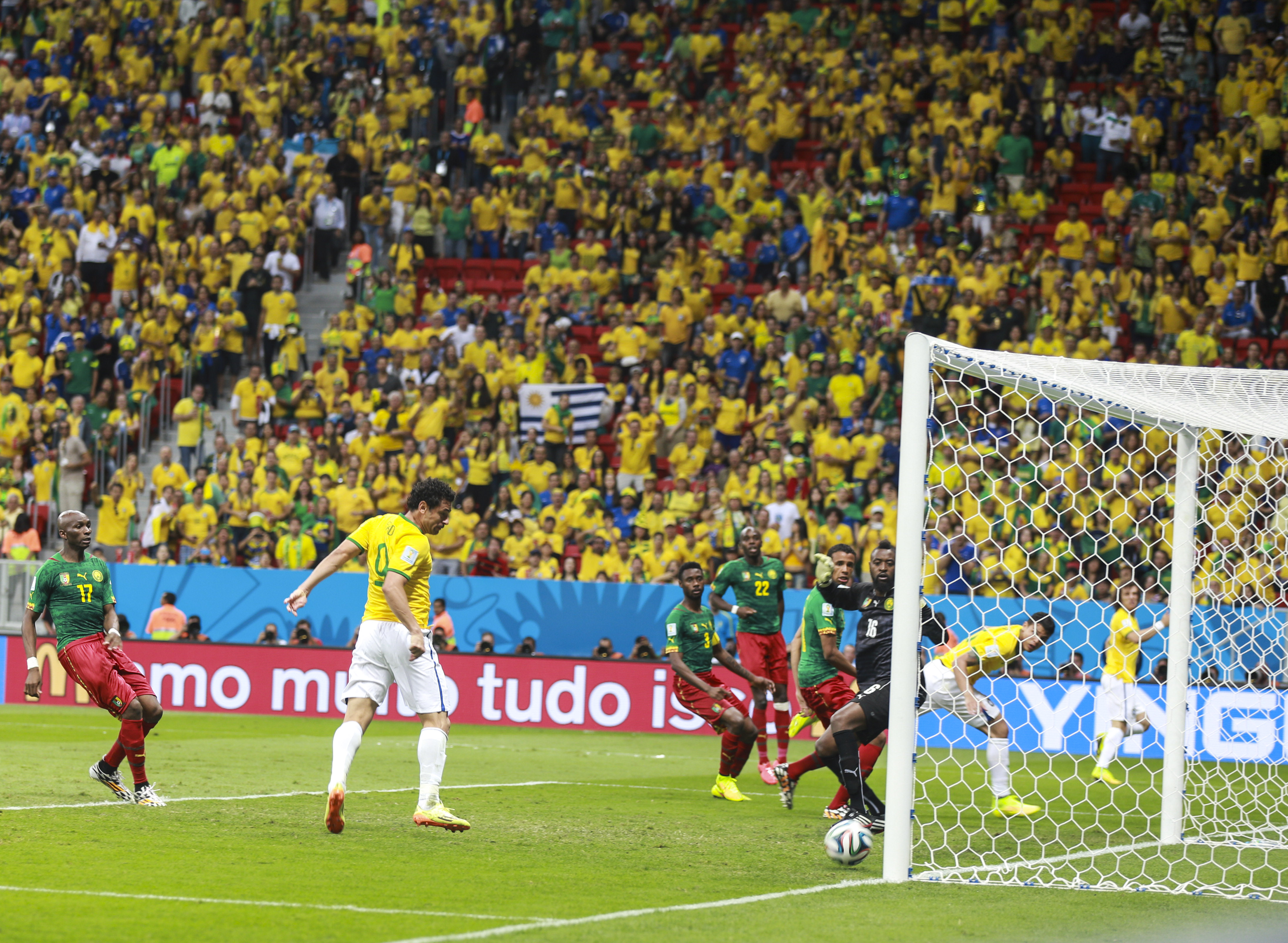
Fred scoring against Cameroon, in what was his final goal for his country, in the 2014 FIFA World Cup.

Scores and results list Brazil's goal tally first, score column indicates score after each Fred goal.

List of international goals scored by Fred
No.	Date	Venue	Opponent	Score	Result	Competition
1	12 November 2005	Zayed Sports City Stadium, Abu Dhabi, United Arab Emirates	United Arab Emirates	3–0	8–0	Friendly
2	12 November 2005	Zayed Sports City Stadium, Abu Dhabi, United Arab Emirates	United Arab Emirates	7–0	8–0	Friendly
3	18 June 2006	Allianz Arena, Munich, Germany	Australia	2–0	2–0	2006 FIFA World Cup
4	10 October 2006	Råsunda, Solna, Sweden	Ecuador	1–1	2–1	Friendly
5	7 June 2011	Pacaembu, São Paulo, Brazil	Romania	1–0	1–0	Friendly
6	9 July 2011	Estadio Mario Alberto Kempes, Córdoba, Argentina	Paraguay	2–2	2–2	2011 Copa América
7	21 November 2012	La Bombonera, Buenos Aires, Argentina	Argentina	1–1	1–2	2012 Superclásico de las Américas
8	6 February 2013	Wembley Stadium, London, England	England	1–1	1–2	Friendly
9	21 March 2013	Stade de Genève, Geneva, Switzerland	Italy	1–0	2–2	Friendly
10	25 March 2013	Stamford Bridge, London, England	Russia	1–1	1–1	Friendly
11	2 June 2013	Maracanã, Rio de Janeiro, Brazil	England	1–0	2–2	Friendly
12	22 June 2013	Itaipava Arena Fonte Nova, Salvador, Brazil	Italy	3–1	4–2	2013 FIFA Confederations Cup
13	22 June 2013	Itaipava Arena Fonte Nova, Salvador, Brazil	Italy	4–2	4–2	2013 FIFA Confederations Cup
14	26 June 2013	Mineirão, Belo Horizonte, Brazil	Uruguay	1–0	2–1	2013 FIFA Confederations Cup
15	30 June 2013	Maracanã, Rio de Janeiro, Brazil	Spain	1–0	3–0	2013 FIFA Confederations Cup
16	30 June 2013	Maracanã, Rio de Janeiro, Brazil	Spain	3–0	3–0	2013 FIFA Confederations Cup
17	6 June 2014	Morumbi, São Paulo, Brazil	Serbia	1–0	1–0	Friendly
18	23 June 2014	Estádio Nacional Mané Garrincha, Brasília, Brazil	Cameroon	3–1	4–1	2014 FIFA World Cup

== Honours ==
Lyon

- Ligue 1: 2005–06, 2006–07, 2007–08
- Coupe de France: 2007–08

Fluminense

- Campeonato Brasileiro Série A: 2010, 2012
- Campeonato Carioca: 2012, 2022
- Primeira Liga: 2016

Atlético Mineiro

- Campeonato Mineiro: 2017

Cruzeiro

- Copa do Brasil: 2018
- Campeonato Mineiro: 2018, 2019

Brazil

- Copa América: 2007
- FIFA Confederations Cup: 2013

Individual

- Bola de Prata: 2011, 2012
- Campeonato Brasileiro Série A Team of the Year: 2011, 2012
- Campeonato Brasileiro Série A Best Player: 2012
- Campeonato Brasileiro Série A Top Goalscorer: 2012, 2014, 2016
- FIFA Confederations Cup Silver Boot: 2013
- FIFA Confederations Cup Castrol Index Top XI: 2013
