= Marcos Antônio (footballer, born 1988) =

Brazilian footballer

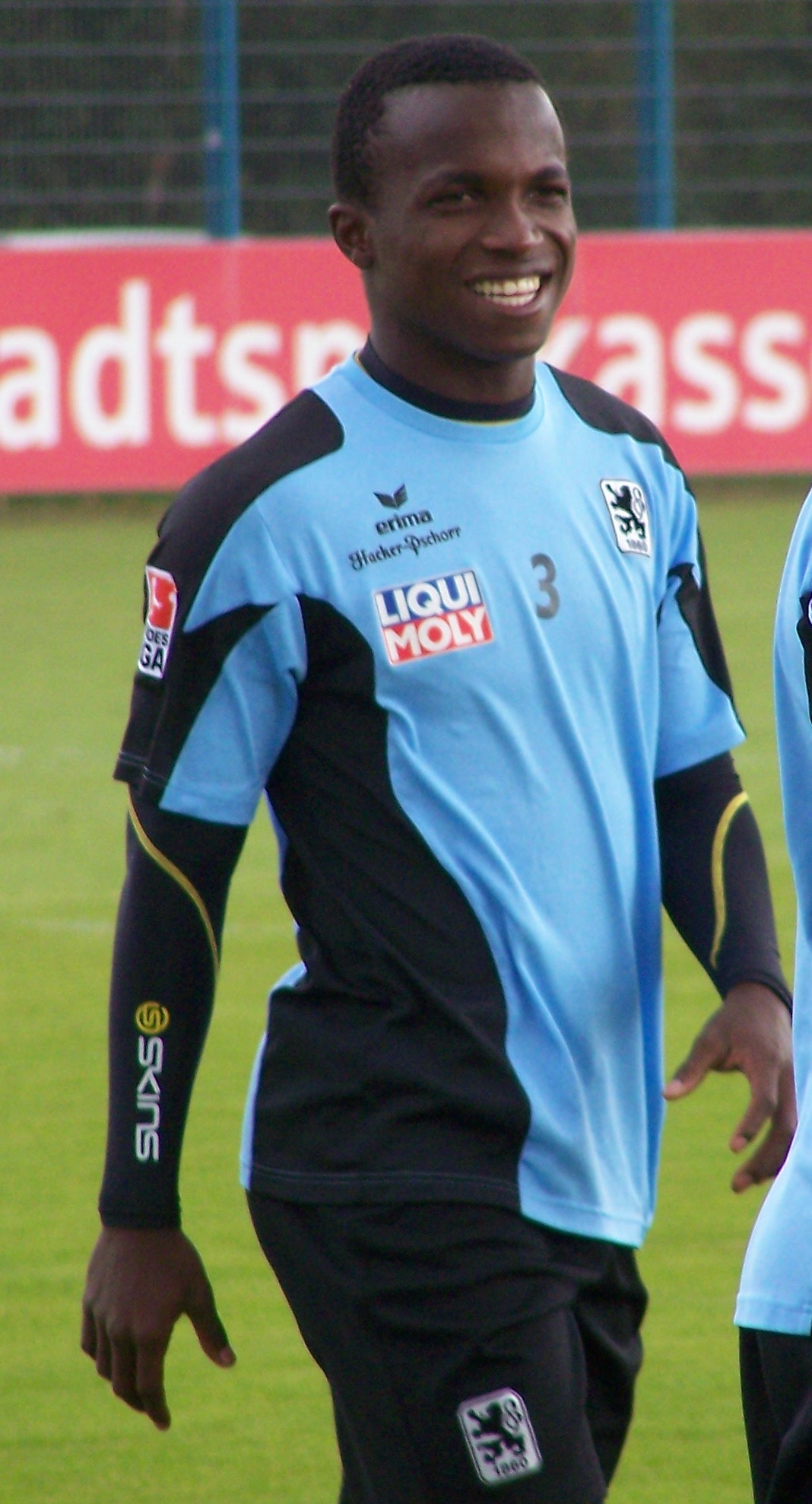
- Marcos Antônio with 1860 Munich in 2009

Personal information
- Full name: Marcos Antonio Nascimento Santos
- Date of birth: 11 June 1988 (age 38)
- Place of birth: Maceió, Brazil
- Height: 1.72 m (5 ft 8 in)
- Positions: Midfielder; defender

Team information
- Current team: Taubaté

Senior career*
Years	Team	Apps	(Gls)
2005–2011	CSA	58	(7)
2006	→ Kashiwa Reysol	0	(0)
2007	→ CRB (loan)	6	(0)
2008	→ ASA (loan)	7	(0)
2008	→ América (loan)	4	(0)
2009	→ Gama (loan)	4	(0)
2009	→ CSA (loan)	4	(1)
2009–2010	→ 1860 Munich (loan)	5	(0)
2011	→ Boa (loan)	6	(1)
2011	→ CRB (loan)	5	(0)
2012	Nacional-MG	5	(0)
2013	CRB	12	(0)
2013	Santa Rita	0	(0)
2014	Atlético Goianiense	2	(0)
2015	CSA	0	(0)
2015	ASA	17	(1)
2016	Botafog-PB	0	(0)
2016	URT	0	(0)
2016–2018	CSA	31	(2)
2018	FC Anyang	33	(2)
2019	Paysandu	4	(0)
2020–	Taubaté	0	(0)
- * Club domestic league appearances and goals

Marcos Antônio Nascimento Santos (born 11 June 1988), commonly known as Marcos Antônio, is a Brazilian professional footballer who plays as a midfielder for Taubaté.

== Career ==
Marcos Antônio was born in Maceió. In August 2009, he joined 2. Bundesliga club TSV 1860 Munich on a one-year loan from Brazilian club Corinthians Alagoano and he wore number three in his new club.
