= Mauro Viana =

Brazilian footballer

Personal information
- Full name: Mauro Sérgio Martins Viana
- Date of birth: 22 May 1984 (age 42)
- Place of birth: Ivinhema
- Height: 1.88 m (6 ft 2 in)
- Position: Defender

Team information
- Current team: Uberlândia

Senior career*
Years	Team	Apps	(Gls)
2006–2007	Ferroviária		
2008	União São João		
2009	Paulista	0	(0)
2009	São Caetano	1	(0)
2010	Monte Azul	0	(0)
2010–2012	São Caetano	0	(0)
2011–2012	→ América–RN (loan)	12	(0)
2012	Mogi Mirim	9	(1)
2013	Remo	0	(0)
2013–2014	Oeste	7	(0)
2015	Botafogo–PB	0	(0)
2016	URT	0	(0)
2016	Confiança	6	(0)
2017–	Uberlândia	0	(0)
- * Club domestic league appearances and goals as of 31 January 2017

Mauro Sérgio Martins Viana (born 22 May 1984), known as Mauro Viana, is a Brazilian footballer who plays for Uberlândia as a defender.

== Career statistics ==
As of 31 January 2017

Club	Season	League			State League		Cup		Continental		Other		Total	
Club	Season	Division	Apps	Goals	Apps	Goals	Apps	Goals	Apps	Goals	Apps	Goals	Apps	Goals
Paulista	2009	Série D	—		6	1	—		—		—		6	1
São Caetano	2009	Série B	1	0	—		—		—		—		1	0
Monte Azul	2010	Paulista	—		16	1	—		—		—		16	1
São Caetano	2010	Série B	0	0	—		—		—		—		0	0
América–RN	2011	Série C	12	0	13	1	—		—		—		25	1
América–RN	2012	Série B	—		8	0	—		—		—		8	0
América–RN	Subtotal		12	0	21	1	—		—		—		33	1
Mogi Mirim	2012	Série D	12	1	—		—		—		—		12	1
Remo	2013	Paraense	—		14	0	—		—		—		14	0
Oeste	2013	Série B	7	0	—		—		—		—		7	0
Oeste	2014	Série B	—		6	1	—		—		—		6	1
Oeste	Subtotal		7	0	6	1	—		—		—		13	1
Botafogo–PB	2015	Série C	—		8	0	1	0	—		4 (Note: All appearance(s) in Copa do Nordeste)	0	13	0
URT	2016	Série D	—		12	0	—		—		—		12	0
Confiança	2016	Série C	6	0	—		—		—		—		6	0
Uberlândia	2017	Mineiro	—		1	0	—		—		—		1	0
Career total			38	1	84	4	1	0	0	0	4	0	127	5
