= Leonardo Silva (footballer, born 1979) =

Brazilian footballer

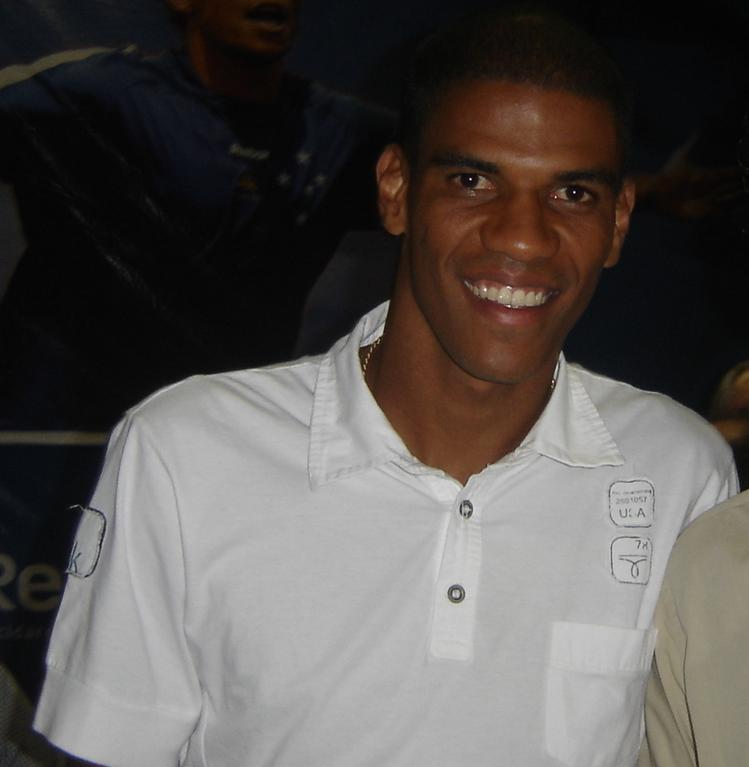

Personal information
- Full name: Leonardo Fabiano Silva e Silva
- Date of birth: 22 June 1979 (age 47)
- Place of birth: Rio de Janeiro, Brazil
- Height: 1.92 m (6 ft 4 in)
- Position: Centre-back

Youth career
- –1998: América-RJ

Senior career*
| Years | Team | Apps | (Gls) |
| 1999–2002 | América-RJ | | |
| 2002–2003 | Clementi Khalsa | | |
| 2004 | Bahia | 28 | (3) |
| 2005–2006 | Palmeiras | 24 | (2) |
| 2006 | Portuguesa | 15 | (5) |
| 2007 | Juventude | 19 | (1) |
| 2007–2008 | Al Wahda | | |
| 2008 | Vitória | 27 | (1) |
| 2009–2010 | Cruzeiro | 29 | (3) |
| 2011–2019 | Atlético Mineiro | 198 | (22) |
- * Club domestic league appearances and goals as of 11 July 2018

Leonardo Fabiano Silva e Silva, commonly known as Leonardo Silva (born 22 June 1979) is a Brazilian former professional footballer who played as a central defender.

On 13 November 2012, he was called up by Mano Menezes to play Superclásico de las Américas for Brazil, against Argentina.

== Career statistics ==
As of 11 July 2018

Appearances and goals by club, season and competition
| Club | Season | League | | Cup | | Continental | | Other | | Total | |
| Club | Season | Apps | Goals | Apps | Goals | Apps | Goals | Apps | Goals | Apps | Goals |
|---|---|---|---|---|---|---|---|---|---|---|---|
| Palmeiras | 2005 | 17 | 1 | 0 | 0 | 0 | 0 | 0 | 0 | 17 | 1 |
| Palmeiras | 2006 | 7 | 1 | 0 | 0 | 7 | 1 | 1 | 0 | 15 | 2 |
| Palmeiras | Total | 24 | 2 | 0 | 0 | 7 | 1 | 1 | 0 | 32 | 3 |
| Juventude | 2007 | 19 | 1 | 0 | 0 | 0 | 0 | 0 | 0 | 19 | 1 |
| Vitória | 2008 | 27 | 1 | 0 | 0 | 0 | 0 | 0 | 0 | 27 | 1 |
| Cruzeiro | 2009 | 25 | 3 | 0 | 0 | 14 | 1 | 7 | 2 | 46 | 6 |
| Cruzeiro | 2010 | 4 | 0 | 0 | 0 | 11 | 0 | 1 | 1 | 16 | 1 |
| Cruzeiro | Total | 29 | 3 | 0 | 0 | 25 | 1 | 8 | 3 | 62 | 7 |
| Atlético Mineiro | 2011 | 31 | 6 | 2 | 0 | 2 | 0 | 3 | 0 | 38 | 6 |
| Atlético Mineiro | 2012 | 33 | 6 | 0 | 0 | 0 | 0 | 0 | 0 | 33 | 6 |
| Atlético Mineiro | 2013 | 30 | 1 | 2 | 0 | 10 | 1 | 11 | 1 | 53 | 3 |
| Atlético Mineiro | 2014 | 24 | 3 | 6 | 0 | 10 | 0 | 9 | 0 | 49 | 3 |
| Atlético Mineiro | 2015 | 32 | 3 | 2 | 1 | 5 | 1 | 7 | 0 | 46 | 5 |
| Atlético Mineiro | 2016 | 24 | 1 | 5 | 1 | 9 | 0 | 9 | 2 | 47 | 3 |
| Atlético Mineiro | 2017 | 21 | 1 | 3 | 0 | 6 | 0 | 8 | 0 | 38 | 1 |
| Atlético Mineiro | 2018 | 3 | 1 | 6 | 0 | 0 | 0 | 11 | 1 | 20 | 2 |
| Atlético Mineiro | Total | 198 | 22 | 26 | 2 | 42 | 2 | 58 | 4 | 324 | 29 |
| Career total | | 297 | 28 | 26 | 2 | 74 | 4 | 67 | 7 | 264 | 42 |

== Honours ==
Brasiliense

- Série C: 2002
- Campeonato Brasiliense: 2002

Vitória

- Campeonato Baiano: 2008

Cruzeiro

- Campeonato Mineiro: 2009

Atlético Mineiro

- Campeonato Mineiro: 2012, 2013, 2015, 2017
- Copa Libertadores: 2013
- Recopa Sudamericana: 2014
- Copa do Brasil: 2014

Individual

- Campeonato Brasileiro Série A Team of the Year: 2012
