= Pablo Diogo =

Brazilian footballer

Personal information
- Full name: Pablo Diogo Lopes de Lima
- Date of birth: 18 December 1992 (age 33)
- Place of birth: Campinas, Brazil
- Height: 1.75 m (5 ft 9 in)
- Positions: Winger; right back

Team information
- Current team: Figueirense
- Number: 78

Youth career
- Guarani

Senior career*
Years	Team	Apps	(Gls)
2010–2013	Guarani	3	(0)
2013	→ Monte Azul (loan)	0	(0)
2013–2015	Oeste	40	(2)
2015–2019	Atlético Mineiro	8	(0)
2015	→ América Mineiro (loan)	16	(1)
2016–2017	→ Vegalta Sendai (loan)	6	(0)
2017	→ CRB (loan)	4	(0)
2018–2019	→ Coritiba (loan)	22	(0)
2019–2020	Santa Clara	13	(0)
2020–2021	Guarani	80	(6)
2022	Chapecoense	15	(0)
2022	Operário Ferroviário	4	(0)
2023	Santo André	12	(0)
2023–	Vitória	6	(0)
2023–	Ituano	10	(1)
2023–	Inter de Limeira	8	(1)
2023–	Figueirense	5	(0)
- * Club domestic league appearances and goals as of 10 November 2026

Pablo Diogo Lopes de Lima (born 18 December 1992), simply known as Pablo Diogo or Pablo, is a Brazilian footballer who plays as a winger for Figueirense. He also plays as a right back.

== Club career ==
Born in Campinas, São Paulo, Pablo was a Guarani youth graduate. He made his first team – and Série A – debut on 20 November 2010, coming on as a second-half substitute for Preto in a 1–2 away loss against Flamengo. He appeared in two further matches during the campaign, as his side suffered relegation.

On 14 December 2012, Pablo was loaned to Monte Azul for six months. Shortly after his loan expired, he moved to Oeste.

Pablo scored his first professional goal on 13 September 2013, netting his team's second in a 2–1 Série B win at Paraná. He was regularly used by his new side, appearing in 28 matches and scoring two goals.

On 2 June 2015 Pablo signed for Atlético Mineiro, being immediately loaned to América Mineiro for the remainder of the season.

In 2016, Pablo was loaned to J1 League club Vegalta Sendai. In 2017, he returned to Atlético and was integrated into the main squad.

On 28 January 2020 he scored an own goal against Santos in the 93rd minute, which cost them the match.
