= Felipe Cordeiro =

Brazilian footballer (born 1991)

Personal information
- Full name: Felipe Cordeiro de Araújo
- Date of birth: 13 August 1991 (age 35)
- Place of birth: Mari, Brazil
- Height: 1.74 m (5 ft 9 in)
- Position: Right-back

Team information
- Current team: Botafogo-PB

Youth career
- 2007–2010: Atlético Mineiro

Senior career*
Years	Team	Apps	(Gls)
2011	Tupi		
2012	Caldense		
2012	Anápolis		
2013	Red Bull Brasil		
2013–2014	Santo André		
2014	Madureira		
2015	Grêmio Novorizontino		
2016	Guarani de Divinopolis		
2016	ASA		
2016–2017	Confiança		
2017–	Botafogo-PB		
- * Club domestic league appearances and goals as of 26 November 2011

Felipe Cordeiro de Araujo is a Brazilian professional footballer who plays as a right back for Botafogo-PB.

== Career ==
On 24 August 2009, he joined Copa Sul-Americana.

=== Career statistics ===
As of 16 October 2010

Club	Season	State League		Brazilian Série A		Copa do Brasil		Copa Sudamericana		Total	
Club	Season	Apps	Goals	Apps	Goals	Apps	Goals	Apps	Goals	Apps	Goals
Atlético Mineiro	2009	-	-	2	0	-	-	1	0	2	0
Atlético Mineiro	2010	-	-	0	0	-	-	-	-	0	0
Total		-	-	2	0	-	-	1	0	3	0

== Honours ==
'Confiança

- Campeonato Sergipano: 2017
