= Clube Atlético Tricordiano =

Tricordiano
- Full name: Clube Atlético Tricordiano
- Nickname(s): CAT; Galo Cabuloso
- Founded: May 13, 2008; 17 years ago
- Ground: Estádio Elias Arbex, 6,500 capacity
- President: Gustavo Vinagre
- 2018: Mineiro Módulo II, 6th
- Website: http://www.tricordiano.com.br/
Home colors	Away colors

Clube Atlético Tricordiano, or simply Tricordiano, is a currently inactive Brazilian football team from Três Corações, Minas Gerais, founded on May 13, 2008.

In 2016, they competed in the Campeonato Mineiro — Módulo I, however, in 2017 they were relegated to Modulo II.
