= 2017 Campeonato Mineiro =

103nd season of Mineiro's top professional football league

Campeonato Mineiro
- Season: 2017
- Champions: Atlético
- Relegated: America-TO Tricordiano
- Matches: 72
- Goals: 158 (2.19 per match)
- Top goalscorer: Fred (Atlético Mineiro) (10 goals)
- Biggest home win: (Atlético Mineiro) 4-0 Tupi
- Biggest away win: Tupi 0-4 Cruzeiro
- Highest attendance: 40,675 Cruzeiro 0-0 Atlético Mineiro
- Lowest attendance: 99 Tricordiano 0-1 Caldense
- Average attendance: 1,841

The 2017 Campeonato Mineiro is the 103nd season of Mineiro's top professional football league. The competition began on January 28 and will end in May.

== Teams ==
- América
- América TO
- Atlético Mineiro
- Caldense
- Cruzeiro
- Democrata GV
- Tombense
- Tricordiano
- Tupi
- Uberlândia
- URT
- Villa Nova

== First stage ==
Pos	Team	Pld	W	D	L	GF	GA	GD	Pts	Qualification or relegation
1	Atlético Mineiro	11	9	0	2	26	9	+17	27	Knockout stage
2	Cruzeiro	11	8	3	0	20	8	+12	27	Knockout stage
3	América Mineiro	11	5	4	2	15	9	+6	19	Knockout stage
4	URT	11	5	4	2	14	11	+3	19	Knockout stage
5	Caldense	11	5	2	4	13	14	−1	17	
6	Uberlândia	11	4	2	5	12	12	0	14	
7	Tombense	11	4	2	5	9	12	−3	14	
8	Tupi	11	3	4	4	8	14	−6	13	
9	Villa Nova	11	3	2	6	12	12	0	11	
10	Democrata GV	11	3	1	7	8	17	−9	10	
11	América (Teófilo Otoni)	11	1	3	7	6	15	−9	6	2018 Módulo II
12	Tricordiano	11	0	5	6	5	15	−10	5	2018 Módulo II

Updated to match(es) played on 13 April 2017. Source:
Rules for classification: 1) points; 2) wins; 3) goal difference; 4) goals scored; 5) head-to-head results; 6) least red cards received; 7) least yellow cards received; 8) draw.

== Knockout stage ==
Semifinals
1	Atlético Mineiro	1	3	4
4	URT	1	0	1
2	Cruzeiro	1	2	3
3	América	1	0	1

Finals
1	Atlético Mineiro	0	2	2
2	Cruzeiro	0	1	1

== Goalscorers ==
As of 13 April 2017

Rank	Player	Club	Goals
1.	(Brazil) Fred	Atlético Mineiro	10
2.	(Brazil) Luiz Eduardo	Caldense	6
3.	(Argentina) Ramón Ábila	Cruzeiro	5
3.	(Brazil) Ronieli Gomes dos Santos	Villa Nova	5
4.	(Brazil) Flávio Caça-Rato	Tupi	4
4.	(Brazil) Rafael Sóbis	Cruzeiro	4
