= União Recreativa dos Trabalhadores =

URT
- Full name: União Recreativa dos Trabalhadores
- Nicknames: Trovão Azul (Blue Thunder); Pato (Duck); Veteranos
- Founded: 9 July 1939; 87 years ago
- Ground: Estádio Zama Maciel, Patos de Minas, Minas Gerais, Brazil
- Capacity: 4.858
- President: Clayton Rogério Ribeiro Lima
- Head Coach: Igor Guerra
- League: Campeonato Mineiro
- 2025: Mineiro Módulo II, 2nd of 12 (promoted)
- Website: http://urt.com.br/
Home colours	Away colours

União Recreativa dos Trabalhadores, commonly known as URT, is a Brazilian football club based in Patos de Minas, Minas Gerais. They competed in the Copa do Brasil six times, in the Série C once, in 1995, and in the Série D five times, being the 2019 edition, their last one. Currently, URT plays in the Campeonato Mineiro Módulo II, the second tier of Minas Gerais state league.

== History ==
The club was founded on July 9, 1939, after a meeting of a group of friends. The club's biggest rivalry is against Mamoré, also from Patos de Minas, known as Clássico do Milho (Corn derby).

They won the Taça Minas Gerais in 1999, beating Democrata-GV in the finals, and in 2000, when they defeated Ipatinga to secure their second title.

URT competed in the Copa do Brasil in 2000, 2001, 2006, 2017, 2018 and 2019. The club best campaigns were in 2006 and 2019, when they made to the second stage.

URT made to the semifinals of the Campeonato Mineiro two times in a row, in 2016 and in 2017. In both occasions they were defeated by Atlético Mineiro, but were given the title of Champion of the Interior.

In 2017, Trovão Azul made its best campaign in the Série D, making to the quarterfinals. URT ended up not being promoted to the Série C, as they were eliminated by Globo in penalties.

== Honours ==
- Taça Minas Gerais
  - Winners (2): 1999, 2000
- Campeonato Mineiro Módulo II
  - Winners (1): 2013
  - Runners-up (3): 1994, 1998, 2025
- Campeonato Mineiro do Interior
  - Winners (2): 2016, 2017

== Stadium ==
União Recreativa dos Trabalhadores play their home games at Estádio Zama Maciel, also known as Mangueirão. The stadium has a maximum capacity of 4,858 people.
