= Clássico Mineiro =

Football Rivalry

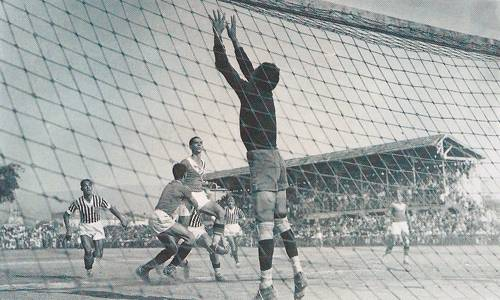
- A Clássico Mineiro played at the Estádio Antônio Carlos in 1941.

- Atlético Mineiro Cruzeiro
- Other names: Superclássico Mineiro
- Location: Belo Horizonte, Minas Gerais, Brazil
- First meeting: April 17, 1921; Friendly; Palestra Itália 3–0 Atlético
- Latest meeting: October 29, 2026; Brazil Série A Atlético 0–1 Cruzeiro

Statistics
- Most wins: Atlético Mineiro
- Most player appearances: Fábio (65)
- Top scorer: Guará (26)
- Largest victory: Atlético Mineiro 9–2 Palestra Itália; Campeonato Mineiro; November 27, 1927

Atlético Mineiro	Cruzeiro

The Clássico Mineiro (English: Derby of Minas Gerais; Mineiro is the gentilic for those born in Minas Gerais) is the football derby between Atlético Mineiro and Cruzeiro, both teams from Belo Horizonte, Brazil. It is one of the fiercest rivalries in Brazilian and South American football.

The two clubs practically monopolize the Campeonato Mineiro, and have clashed in decisive matches in the Brasileirão, Copa do Brasil and continental CONMEBOL competitions of.

== History ==
Atlético was founded in the early years of the 20th Century, on March 25, 1908. Cruzeiro was founded 13 years later, on January 2, 1921, among the Belo Horizonte's Italian community, as Palestra Itália. In 1942, due to the enmity between Brazil and Italy in the World War II, Palestra had to change its name to Cruzeiro.

The first derby took place on April 17, 1921, with the newcomer Palestra winning 3–0. The first official match between the two was won by Atlético, by 2–1, on May 15, 1921.

Atlético Mineiro's largest win in the history of the Clássico Mineiro was on November 27, 1927, in a Campeonato Mineiro match. Galo, which was undefeated that season, thrashed Palestra Itália 9–2 and secured its third Championship title.

In the 1931 Campeonato Mineiro, both Atlético and Palestra finished the competition at the top of the table, tied on points. Thus, according to the rules of the championship, a tie-breaking final was necessary, the first one in the history of the fixture. On November 29, Atlético won the first leg 2–1 at Palestra's stadium. The second leg, which would take place on December 6 at Atlético's stadium, less than 1 mile away from their rival's, did not happen. Atlético had not hired a referee from Rio de Janeiro, as it had been agreed, then gave a list to Palestra with three others from Minas Gerais, which the Italians refused. In addition to that, the preliminary match between their reserve teams had already ended in a fight. The Federation tried to reschedule the match, but Palestra Itália left the entity, which ended up proclaiming Galo the champions. As a result of this conflict, in 1932, there were two different championships in Minas Gerais, organized by different associations.

In the finals of the 1956 Campeonato Mineiro, after an 1–1 in the first match and a 0–0 in the second, Atlético won the third match 1–0 and won the championship for the fifth time in a row. However, before the last game, Cruzeiro claimed that Atlético had irregularly called in the player Laércio in the second match. Only in 1959, the Superior Court of Sport Justice (STJD) gave the points of the second match to Cruzeiro, legitimizing the club's claim. As the finals were now tied and the clubs were against the idea of scheduling a fourth match, the Federation proclaimed both Atlético and Cruzeiro the champions.

The first derby outside of Minas Gerais took place on June 16, 1960, in a friendly match at the Israel Pinheiro Stadium in Brasília, Brazil's recentely founded capital. The clubs were invited to celebrate the peace between the two, by the president Juscelino Kubitschek, born in Minas Gerais and a Cruzeiro fan. This was the only Clássico outside Minas Gerais in Brazil's territory, which ended in a 2–2 draw.

The Estádio Governardor Magalhães Pinto, better known as Mineirão, opened on September 5, 1965, and became the home ground of both teams for decades. The first derby at the stadium took place on October 24, 1965, for the Campeonato Mineiro. In the 79th minute of the match, when Cruzeiro was winning 1–0 with a goal from Tostão, the referee Juan de La Passion Artéz rewarded a penalty to the Raposa. Atlético's players were outraged with the signaling and some of them fought with the referee and the police. Galo's coach and more nine players were sent off. The referee ended the match with a Cruzeiro win in the Clássico.

The beginning of the "Mineirão Era" coincided with a period of dominance by Cruzeiro. With a richly talented team comprising Raul, Piazza, Dirceu Lopes, Natal and Tostão, the Foxes won the 1966 Campeonato Brasileiro and five successive state titles from 1965 to 1969, as Atlético were the runners-up on four occasions.

The first Campeonato Brasileiro match between the two ended in a 4–0 win for Cruzeiro on March 5, 1967, with an attendance of 91,042 people at Mineirão.

By the mid-70s and 80s, Atlético Mineiro established an impressive cast of players of their own, with João Leite, Luizinho, Cerezo, Paulo Isidoro, Nelinho, Éder and Reinaldo making them one of the most revered forces in Brazilian football. During this period, they consistently outstripped Cruzeiro in their matches and won the Campeonato Mineiro 11 times in 14 seasons along the way.

In the quarterfinals of the 1986 Campeonato Brasileiro, Atlético and Cruzeiro faced each other for the first time in the knock-out stage of a national tournament. Galo advenced after two draws, in 0–0 and 1–1, since the team with the better campaign had the advantadge in case of a tie.

The 1993 Copa de Oro reunited the champions of CONMEBOL competitions in 1992. Atlético, as the champions of the Copa Conmebol, and Cruzeiro, as the champions of the Supercopa Libertadores, faced each other in the semi-finals, in a single match at Mineirão. After a 0–0 draw, Atlético advanced to the finals after winning 5–4 on penalties.

The Clássico took place in the quarterfinals of the Campeonato Brasileiro again in 1999, after Atlético finished 7th and Cruzeiro 2nd in the first stage. Atlético won the first match 4–2 and the second one 3–2. The topscorer of the championship, Guilherme, scored 4 goals against Cruzeiro and Galo advanced to the semi-finals.

Cruzeiro's largest win in the Clássico Mineiro was on December 4, 2011, in the last round of the Campeonato Brasileiro. The Foxes could be relegated for the first time if they lost the derby, but thrashed Atlético 6–1 at the Arena do Jacaré.

After Atlético winning the 2013 Copa Libertadores and the 2014 Recopa Sudamericana, and Cruzeiro winning the Campeonato Brasileiro in 2013 and 2014, both rivals made to the finals of the 2014 Copa do Brasil. This was the first time a national level tournament final featured both Belo Horizonte clubs. The first game took place at the Arena Independência and Atlético won 2–0. In the second match, Cruzeiro was the home team at Mineirão and Galo won again, by 1–0, being crowned champions of the competition for the first time.

The Superclássico Mineiro took place in the Copa do Brasil again in 2019, this time, in the quarterfinals. Cruzeiro won the first leg 3–0 at Mineirão and lost the second leg 2–0 at Independência, thus winning 3–2 on aggregate and advancing to the semi-finals.

The derby has already taken place outside Brazil twice. The first encounter was on January 17, 2009, for the semi-finals of the Uruguayan friendly tournament Copa Bimbo, in which Cruzeiro won 4–2 at the famous Estadio Centenário. The second match was on January 18, 2025, for the first round of the FC Series, at the Orlando City Stadium, in the United States. The match ended in a 0–0 draw and 22,743 people attended it.

== Supporters ==
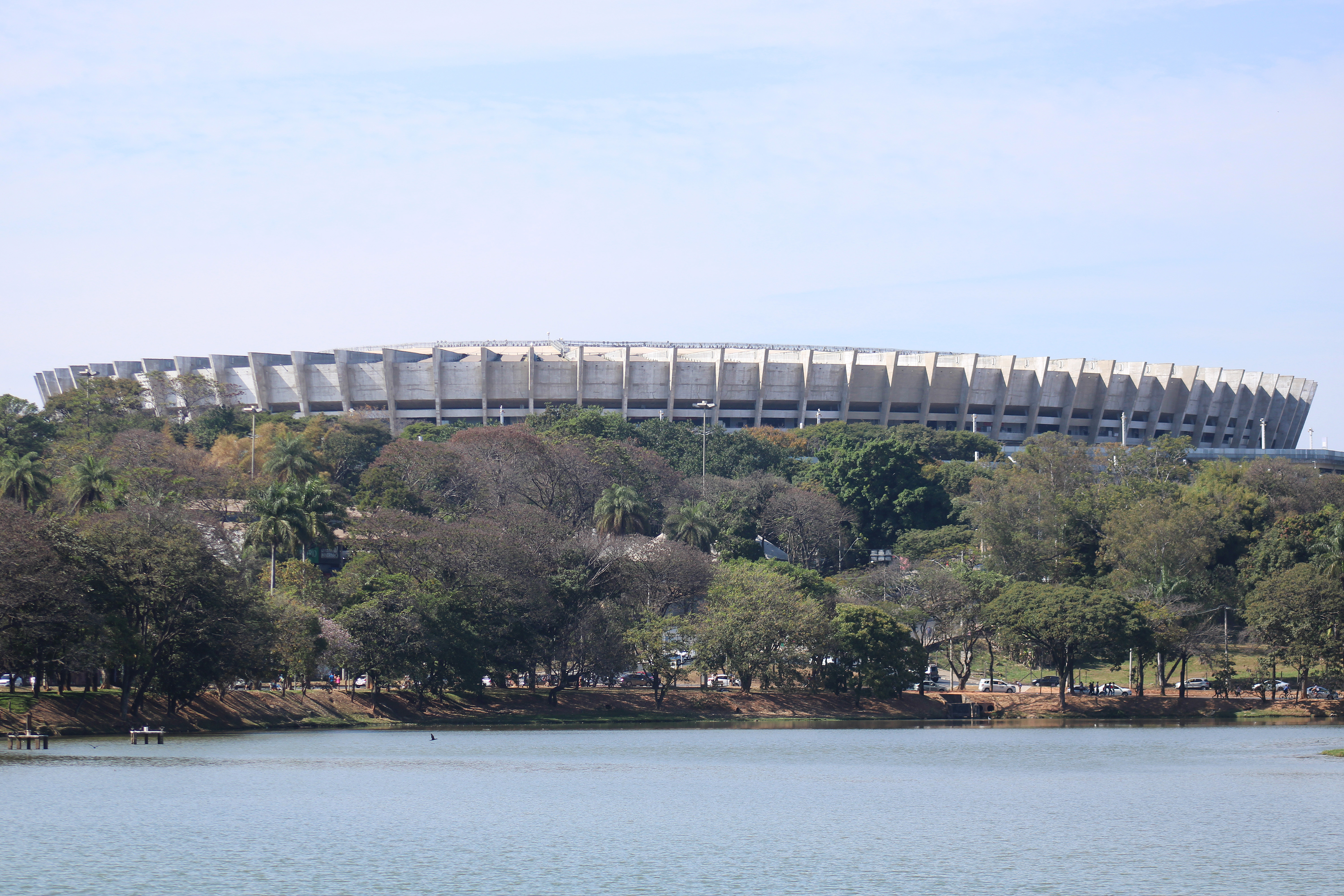
The Mineirão Stadium seen from the Pampulha Lake

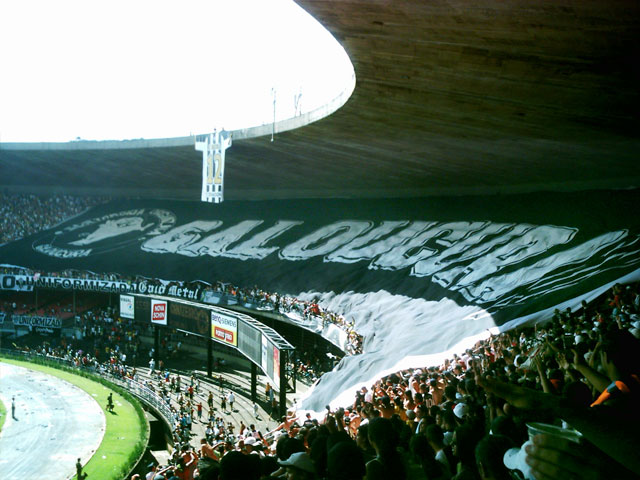
Atlético supporters at the old Mineirão

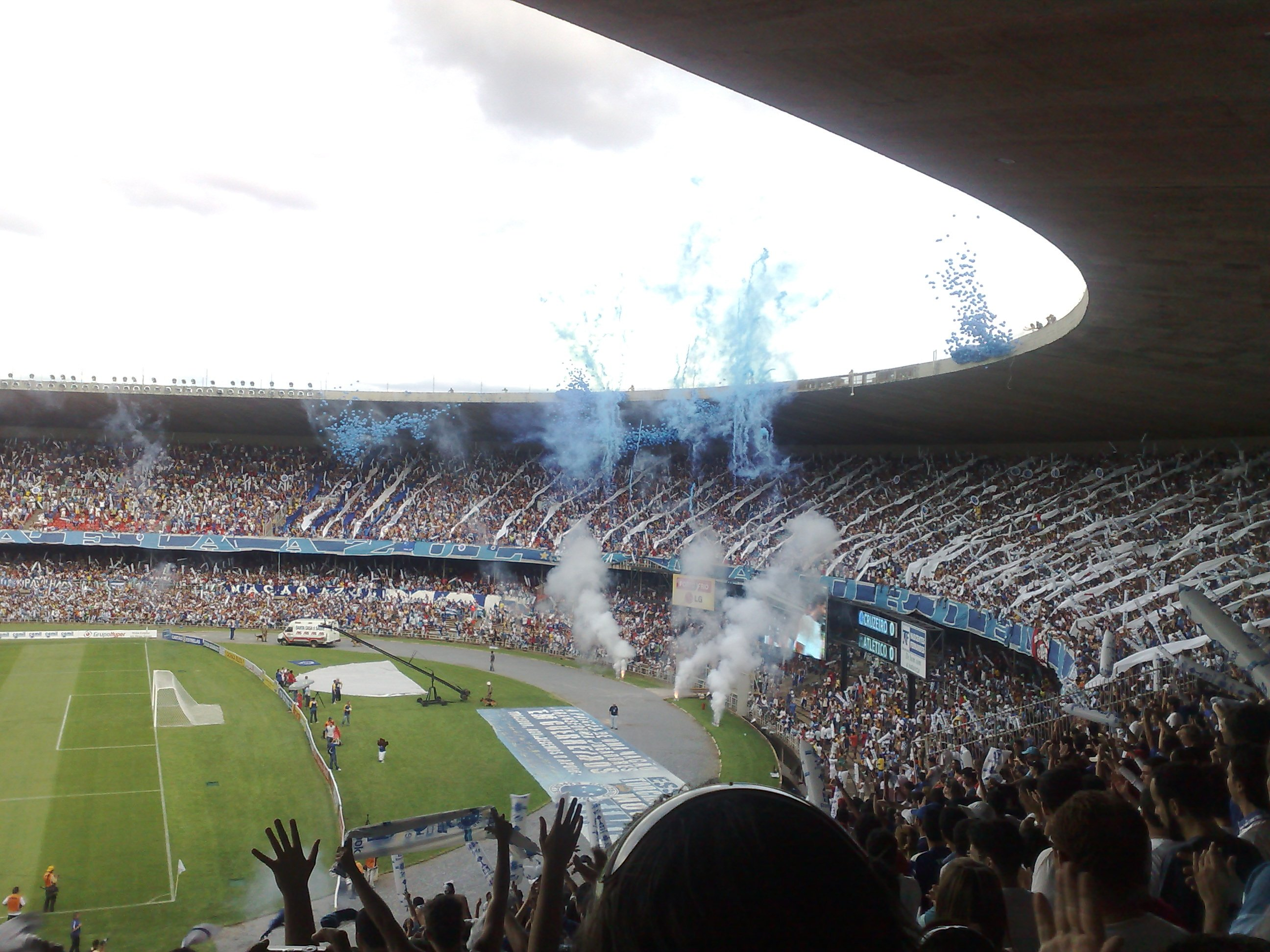
Cruzeiro supporters at the old Mineirão

=== Supporters rivalry ===
The rivalry between the fanbases of Atlético and Cruzeiro is considered one of the most heated of Brazilian football and is seen in numerous provocative flags, tifos, chants and player celebrations towards the opposing side on derby days, in addition to cases of violent conflicts between groups of supporters. Regarding to nicknames, Atlético fans refer to Cruzeiro supporters as "marias", a play on the name of their rivals' main Torcida organizada, Máfia Azul (Blue Mafia). Meanwhile, Cruzeiro fans call their rivals "frangas" (chickens), mocking Atlético's mascot, the rooster.

From 1965 to 2010, almost every derby between Atlético Mineiro and Cruzeiro took place at Mineirão, with the fans splitting the stadium in half. Cruzeiro supporters took the "city side", to the right of the press tribunes, while Atlético supporters occupied the "lake side", to the left. These names are a reference to the Pampulha Lake, next to the stadium. It also gave rise to the term "the other side of the lake" commonly used by fans to refer to their rivals.

Both fanbases claim to be the biggest one in Minas Gerais and the people's club of the state. On Atlético Mineiro's side, the club opened its doors to players from every social class, nationality or ethnicity from an early age, earning a status of a popular club. As a result of this vast popular support, the fans came to be collectively known as "A Massa" (The Mass). On Cruzeiro's side, the club was founded as the representative of the Italian colony of Belo Horizonte, and stood out for having a strong participation from the working class of the community, unlike Atlético and América, which were founded by upper-class students. Alluding to that, in 2015, Cruzeiro's marketing started using the "people's club" slogan, to which Atlético respodend in the same year, claiming to be the "true people's club".

=== Surveys ===
According to a 2014 Datafolha survey, reproduced by Globoesporte.com, the results are these:

- Atlético: 2% (4.1 million people).
- Cruzeiro: 3% (6.1 million people).

Source: Datafolha

According to a 2014 survey by IBOPE, reproduced by Globoesporte.com, the results are these:

- Atlético: 3.5% (7.1 million people).
- Cruzeiro: 3.1% (6.3 million people).

Source: Ibope

According to a 2023 survey by AtlasIntel, the results are these:

- Atlético: 4.3% of supporters.
- Cruzeiro: 6.1% of supporters.

Source: AtlasIntel

According to a 2024 survey by Quaest, demanded by CNN Brazil and the Itatiaia radio network, the results are these:

- Atlético: 4% of supporters.
- Cruzeiro: 4% of supporters.

Source: Quaest

== Statistics ==
Atlético Mineiro and Cruzeiro have their own different versions of the statistics of the fixture. From the first derby on April 17, 1921, to the mid-1940s, there was no practice of registering the data and results of the games in an official summary. Atlético counts all the times the teams went to the playing field and faced each other. Cruzeiro says it does not consider games in which one of them played with their reserve team ("time de aspirantes"). Interestingly, however, there are matches that entered Cruzeiro's accounts that do not appear in Atlético's records.

=== Atlético Mineiro version ===
Statistics
Matches	537
Atlético wins	216
Cruzeiro wins	177
Drawn	144
Goals
Atlético goals	753
Cruzeiro goals	668

=== Cruzeiro version ===
Statistics
Matches	519
Atlético wins	204
Cruzeiro wins	176
Drawn	139
Goals
Atlético goals	722
Cruzeiro goals	657

=== Record by decade ===
The following statistics are taking into account Cruzeiro's version of the fixture.

Decade	Matches	Atlético wins	Cruzeiro wins	Draws	H2H
1921–1930	15	5	6	4	+1
1931–1940	53	24	20	9	+3
1941–1950	61	32	20	9	+15
1951–1960	62	29	16	17	+28
1961–1970	50	16	20	14	+24
1971–1980	65	24	18	23	+30
1981–1990	55	20	16	19	+34
1991–2000	44	17	16	11	+35
2001–2010	44	10	22	12	+23
2011–2020	47	18	15	14	+26
2021–2030	23	9	7	7	+28
Total	519	204	176	139	

=== All-time top scorers ===
Player	Club	Goals
Guará	Atlético	26
Niginho	Cruzeiro	25
Alcides Lemos	Cruzeiro	22
Orlando Fantoni	Cruzeiro	18
Reinaldo	Atlético	16
Ubaldo	Atlético	16
Abelardo	Cruzeiro	15
Lucas Miranda	Atlético	15

Source: Superesportes

=== All-time most appearances ===
- The player with most appearances in the Clássico for Cruzeiro is Fábio, with 65 matches.
- The player with most appearances in the Clássico for Atlético is João Leite, with 57 matches.
- Nelinho is the second player with most appearances in the Clássico, with 37 matches for Cruzeiro and 27 for Atlético.

Source: O Tempo

=== Largest victories ===
From Atlético Mineiro:

Date	Match	Event	Stadium
November 27, 1927	Atlético 9–2 Palestra	1927 Campeonato Mineiro	América's ground
June 21, 1936	Palestra 1–6 Atlético	1936 Campeonato Mineiro (Note: This game was played as a Campeonato Mineiro match, however, as Palestra Itália abandoned the competition later on, all their matches were considered nulled and did not enter in the final standings of the championship.)	Barro Preto
May 27, 1942	Atlético 6–1 Palestra	Friendly	Lourdes
June 21, 1953	Atlético 5–0 Cruzeiro	1953 Campeonato Mineiro	Lourdes

From Cruzeiro:

Date	Match	Event	Stadium
December 4, 2011	Cruzeiro 6–1 Atlético	2011 Campeonato Brasileiro Série A	Arena do Jacaré
April 27, 2008	Atlético 0–5 Cruzeiro	2008 Campeonato Mineiro	Mineirão
April 26, 2009	Cruzeiro 5–0 Atlético	2009 Campeonato Mineiro	Mineirão

Sources: Cruzeiropédia Superesportes

=== Longest unbeaten runs ===
Team	Period	Nº of matches	Results
Atlético	1985 to 1987	13	Five wins and eight draws
Cruzeiro	2007 to 2009	12	Ten wins and two draws
Atlético	2013 to 2015	11	Six wins and five draws
Atlético	1947 to 1948	10	Nine wins and one draw
Atlético	1937 to 1939	10	Eight wins and two draws
Cruzeiro	1966 to 1968	10	Five wins and five draws
Atlético	1970 to 1972	10	Four wins and six draws
Cruzeiro	2000 to 2002	10	Three wins and seven draws

Source: Globoesporte.com

=== Most consecutive wins ===
Games	Club	Period
7	Cruzeiro	November 15, 1964 – February 9, 1966
7	Cruzeiro	April 27, 2008 – April 26, 2009
6	Atlético	April 8, 1938 – January 8, 1939
5	Cruzeiro	May 28, 1933 – April 1, 1934
5	Atlético	1 February 1942 4 – October 1942
5	Atlético	July 13, 1947 – April 13, 1948
5	Atlético	May 17, 1951 – March 16, 1952

=== Statistics in the Campeonato Brasileiro Série A ===
==== Record by stadium ====
Stadium	Matches	Atlético wins	Draws	Cruzeiro wins	Atlético goals	Cruzeiro goals
Mineirão	60	20	23	17	72	68
Arena Independência	9	6	1	2	17	12
Arena do Jacaré	3	0	0	3	2	9
Parque do Sabiá	2	2	0	0	5	3
Arena MRV	4	1	1	2	4	3
Total	78	29	25	24	100	95

Source: A história do Clássico Mineiro

==== Doing the double ====
Since 2003, when the Campeonato Brasileiro adopted the round-robin system, one of the teams has beaten their rivals in both matches 7 times. The results are arranged based on the order in which the matches were played, from left to right.

Season	Team	Results	
2004	Atlético	2–0	3–0
2005	Cruzeiro	2–1	1–0
2007	Cruzeiro	4–2	4–3
2008	Cruzeiro	2–1	2–0
2011	Cruzeiro	2–1	6–1
2014	Atlético	2–1	3–2
2017	Atlético	3–1	3–1

==== Head-to-head ranking (2003–present) ====
P.	03	04	05	06	07	08	09	10	11	12	13	14	15	16	17	18	19	20	21	22	23	24	25
1	1										1	1							1				
2								2		2			2										
3						3												3			3		3
4							4							4									
5					5							5			5								
6																6							
7	7						7													7			
8			8		8						8		8			8							
9										9					9							9	
10				10																			
11																							11
12						12								12								12	
13		13						13									13				13		
14																							
15									15														
16									16														
17																	17						
18																							
19		19																					
20			20																				
21																							
22																							
23																							
24																							
Série B
1				1																1			
2																							
3																							
4																							
5																							
6																							
7																							
8																							
9																							
10																							
11																		11					
12																							
13																							
14																			14				

• Total: Cruzeiro 13 times higher, Atlético 10 times higher.

=== Largest attendances ===
List of the 20 largest attendances in the history of the Clássico Mineiro.

Date	Match	Event	Stadium	Attendance
May 4, 1969	Atlético 0–1 Cruzeiro	Campeonato Mineiro	Mineirão	123,351
October 9, 1977	Cruzeiro 3–1 Atlético	Campeonato Mineiro	Mineirão	122,534
October 26, 1980	Cruzeiro 0–1 Atlético	Campeonato Mineiro	Mineirão	115,983
November 8, 1981	Atlético 1–1 Cruzeiro	Campeonato Mineiro	Mineirão	112,919
June 2, 1968	Cruzeiro 2–1 Atlético	Campeonato Mineiro	Mineirão	110,432
December 15, 1974	Cruzeiro 2–1 Atlético	Campeonato Mineiro	Mineirão	109,363
December 5, 1982	Cruzeiro 1–2 Atlético	Campeonato Mineiro	Mineirão	108,935
August 2, 1970	Cruzeiro 1–2 Atlético	Campeonato Mineiro	Mineirão	106,155
April 3, 1977	Atlético 2–0 Cruzeiro	Campeonato Mineiro	Mineirão	103,725
April 25, 1976	Atlético 2–1 Cruzeiro	Taça Minas Gerais	Mineirão	101,404
December 9, 1984	Atlético 1–0 Cruzeiro	Campeonato Mineiro	Mineirão	99,174
March 27, 1977	Cruzeiro 0–2 Atlético	Campeonato Mineiro	Mineirão	99,044
January 29, 1978	Atlético 2–1 Cruzeiro	Campeonato Brasileiro	Mineirão	98,778
September 18, 1966	Cruzeiro 2–0 Atlético	Campeonato Mineiro	Mineirão	97,965
September 28, 1969	Cruzeiro 2–1 Atlético	Campeonato Brasileiro	Mineirão	97,928
February 8, 1987	Cruzeiro 0–0 Atlético	Campeonato Brasileiro	Mineirão	94,381
September 10, 1967	Cruzeiro 0–0 Atlético	Campeonato Mineiro	Mineirão	93,577
August 7, 1977	Atlético 0–0 Cruzeiro	Campeonato Mineiro	Mineirão	91,696
March 5, 1967	Cruzeiro 4–0 Atlético	Campeonato Brasileiro	Mineirão	91,042
February 18, 1979	Cruzeiro 1–2 Atlético	Campeonato Mineiro	Mineirão	90,894

== Honours ==
Competition	Atlético Mineiro		Cruzeiro	
Competition	Titles	Years	Titles	Years
Copa Libertadores	1	2013	2	1976, 1997
Recopa Sudamericana	1	2014	1	1998
Supercopa Libertadores	0		2	1991, 1992
Copa Conmebol	2	1992, 1997	0	
Copa Master de Supercopa	0		1	1995
Copa de Oro	0		1	1995
Brazilian Championship	3	1937^{TDC}, 1971, 2021	4	1966^{TB}, 2003, 2013, 2014
Brazil Cup	2	2014, 2021	6	1993, 1996, 2000, 2003, 2017, 2018
Brazil Supercup	1	2022	0	
Brazilian Champions Cup (CBD)	1	1978	0	
Total	11		17	
Brazilian Championship Série B	1	2006	1	2022
Copa Sul-Minas	0		2	2001, 2002
Copa Centro-Oeste	0		1	1999
Minas Gerais Championship	50	1915, 1926, 1927, 1931, 1932, 1936, 1938, 1939, 1941, 1942, 1946, 1947, 1949, 1950, 1952, 1953, 1954, 1955, 1956^{s}, 1958, 1962, 1963, 1970, 1976, 1978, 1979, 1980, 1981, 1982, 1983, 1985, 1986, 1988, 1989, 1991, 1995, 1999, 2000, 2007, 2010, 2012, 2013, 2015, 2017, 2020, 2021, 2022, 2023, 2024, 2025	39	1928, 1929, 1930, 1940, 1943, 1944, 1945, 1956^{s}, 1959,1960, 1961, 1965, 1966, 1967, 1968, 1969, 1972, 1973, 1974, 1975, 1977, 1984, 1987, 1990, 1992, 1994, 1996, 1997, 1998, 2003, 2004, 2006, 2008, 2009, 2011, 2014, 2018, 2019, 2026
Supercampeonato Mineiro	0		1	2002
Total general	62		61	

Notes

- ^{s} = shared title
- ^{TDC} = Torneio dos Campeões (1937), recognized by CBF as the first Brazilian national championship on August 2023.
- ^{TB} = Taça Brasil (1959–1968), recognized by CBF as Brazilian national championships on December 2010.

== Match history ==
=== List of games (Cruzeiro version) ===
April 17, 1921	Atlético	0–3	Palestra	Prado Mineiro (Belo Horizonte)

May 15, 1921	Atlético	2–1	Palestra	Prado Mineiro (Belo Horizonte)

September 11, 1921	Atlético	1–1	Palestra	Prado Mineiro (Belo Horizonte)

March 12, 1922	Atlético	2–1	Palestra	Prado Mineiro (Belo Horizonte)

May 21, 1922	Atlético	0–1	Palestra	Prado Mineiro (Belo Horizonte)

November 12, 1922	Atlético	2–2	Palestra	Prado Mineiro (Belo Horizonte)

May 6, 1923	Atlético	1–1	Palestra	Estádio do América (Belo Horizonte)

September 20, 1925	Atlético	3–5	Palestra	Barro Preto (Belo Horizonte)

August 8, 1927	Atlético	4–2	Palestra	Barro Preto (Belo Horizonte)

November 27, 1927	Atlético	9–2	Palestra	Estádio do América (Belo Horizonte)

September 2, 1928	Atlético	2–0	Palestra	Barro Preto (Belo Horizonte)

December 16, 1928	Atlético	2–2	Palestra	Barro Preto (Belo Horizonte)

June 9, 1929	Atlético	1–3	Palestra	Lourdes (Belo Horizonte)

November 17, 1929	Atlético	2–5	Palestra	Barro Preto (Belo Horizonte)

May 31, 1930	Atlético	1–2	Palestra	Lourdes (Belo Horizonte)

March 1, 1931	Atlético	3–4	Palestra	Barro Preto (Belo Horizonte)

March 22, 1931	Atlético	3–0	Palestra	Lourdes (Belo Horizonte)

June 21, 1931	Atlético	3–2	Palestra	Barro Preto (Belo Horizonte)

October 18, 1931	Atlético	2–3	Palestra	Barro Preto (Belo Horizonte)

November 1, 1931	Atlético	2–3	Palestra	Lourdes (Belo Horizonte)

November 29, 1931	Atlético	2–1	Palestra	Barro Preto (Belo Horizonte)

December 27, 1931	Atlético	1–1	Palestra	Lourdes (Belo Horizonte)

January 1, 1932	Atlético	2–2	Palestra	Barro Preto (Belo Horizonte)

April 23, 1933	Atlético	4–0	Palestra	Lourdes (Belo Horizonte)

May 28, 1933	Atlético	1–2	Palestra	Barro Preto (Belo Horizonte)

August 6, 1933	Atlético	1–2	Palestra	Barro Preto (Belo Horizonte)

October 22, 1933	Atlético	2–3	Palestra	Lourdes (Belo Horizonte)

February 8, 1934	Atlético	1–2	Palestra	Lourdes (Belo Horizonte)

April 1, 1934	Atlético	1–3	Palestra	Barro Preto (Belo Horizonte)

June 3, 1934	Atlético	2–2	Palestra	Barro Preto (Belo Horizonte)

July 15, 1934	Atlético	2–3	Palestra	Barro Preto (Belo Horizonte)

August 26, 1934	Atlético	2–0	Palestra	Lourdes (Belo Horizonte)

December 2, 1934	Atlético	0–0	Palestra	Barro Preto (Belo Horizonte)

December 9, 1934	Atlético	3–4	Palestra	Barro Preto (Belo Horizonte)

January 13, 1935	Atlético	2–2	Palestra	Barro Preto (Belo Horizonte)

April 13, 1935	Atlético	4–2	Palestra	Lourdes (Belo Horizonte)

May 5, 1935	Atlético	4–2	Palestra	Lourdes (Belo Horizonte)

July 7, 1935	Atlético	2–3	Palestra	Barro Preto (Belo Horizonte)

August 4, 1935	Atlético	3–2	Palestra	Lourdes (Belo Horizonte)

August 18, 1935	Atlético	4–2	Palestra	Barro Preto (Belo Horizonte)

October 27, 1935	Atlético	2–1	Palestra	Alameda (Belo Horizonte)

January 5, 1936	Atlético	2–3	Palestra	Lourdes (Belo Horizonte)

February 2, 1936	Atlético	4–3	Palestra	Barro Preto (Belo Horizonte)

June 21, 1936	Atlético	6–1	Palestra	Barro Preto (Belo Horizonte)

October 25, 1936	Atlético	2–0	Palestra	Lourdes (Belo Horizonte)

August 29, 1937	Atlético	1–2	Palestra	Lourdes (Belo Horizonte)

September 12, 1937	Atlético	3–3	Palestra	Barro Preto (Belo Horizonte)

November 13, 1937	Atlético	3–0	Palestra	Alameda (Belo Horizonte)

January 9, 1938	Atlético	3–1	Palestra	Lourdes (Belo Horizonte)

January 30, 1938	Atlético	1–1	Palestra	Alameda (Belo Horizonte)

April 8, 1938	Atlético	2–1	Palestra	Lourdes (Belo Horizonte)

April 21, 1938	Atlético	3–0	Palestra	Barro Preto (Belo Horizonte)

June 5, 1938	Atlético	1–0	Palestra	Barro Preto (Belo Horizonte)

July 24, 1938	Atlético	4–1	Palestra	Lourdes (Belo Horizonte)

September 18, 1938	Atlético	1–0	Palestra	Alameda (Belo Horizonte)

January 8, 1939	Atlético	2–1	Palestra	Lourdes (Belo Horizonte)

February 5, 1939	Atlético	0–4	Palestra	Barro Preto (Belo Horizonte)

March 26, 1939	Atlético	0–1	Palestra	Barro Preto (Belo Horizonte)

April 23, 1939	Atlético	3–0	Palestra	Barro Preto (Belo Horizonte)

June 4, 1939	Atlético	1–0	Palestra	Lourdes (Belo Horizonte)

August 13, 1939	Atlético	2–0	Palestra	Barro Preto (Belo Horizonte)

February 18, 1940	Atlético	0–2	Palestra	Alameda (Belo Horizonte)

March 24, 1940	Atlético	0–3	Palestra	Lourdes (Belo Horizonte)

June 23, 1940	Atlético	2–2	Palestra	Barro Preto (Belo Horizonte)

July 28, 1940	Atlético	1–1	Palestra	Lourdes (Belo Horizonte)

August 25, 1940	Atlético	1–2	Palestra	Lourdes (Belo Horizonte)

September 1, 1940	Atlético	1–3	Palestra	Barro Preto (Belo Horizonte)

December 29, 1940	Atlético	1–3	Palestra	Lourdes (Belo Horizonte)

January 5, 1941	Atlético	2–1	Palestra	Barro Preto (Belo Horizonte)

January 12, 1941	Atlético	0–2	Palestra	Alameda (Belo Horizonte)

January 26, 1941	Atlético	2–5	Palestra	Barro Preto (Belo Horizonte)

July 27, 1941	Atlético	2–1	Palestra	Lourdes (Belo Horizonte)

October 19, 1941	Atlético	0–1	Palestra	Barro Preto (Belo Horizonte)

December 7, 1941	Atlético	2–2	Palestra	Alameda (Belo Horizonte)

February 1, 1942	Atlético	1–0	Palestra	Alameda (Belo Horizonte)

May 27, 1942	Atlético	6–1	Palestra	Lourdes (Belo Horizonte)

August 9, 1942	Atlético	2–0	Palestra	Lourdes (Belo Horizonte)

September 20, 1942	Atlético	1–0	Palestra	Alameda (Belo Horizonte)

October 4, 1942	Atlético	2–1	Palestra	Barro Preto (Belo Horizonte)

December 25, 1942	Atlético	1–3	Cruzeiro	Barro Preto (Belo Horizonte)

January 3, 1943	Atlético	2–1	Cruzeiro	Lourdes (Belo Horizonte)

January 10, 1943	Atlético	1–3	Cruzeiro	Barro Preto (Belo Horizonte)

May 30, 1943	Atlético	3–1	Cruzeiro	Lourdes (Belo Horizonte)

August 10, 1943	Atlético	0–2	Cruzeiro	Lourdes (Belo Horizonte)

October 3, 1943	Atlético	0–1	Cruzeiro	Barro Preto (Belo Horizonte)

April 5, 1944	Atlético	0–2	Cruzeiro	Lourdes (Belo Horizonte)

April 16, 1944	Atlético	1–1	Cruzeiro	Lourdes (Belo Horizonte)

June 11, 1944	Atlético	1–2	Cruzeiro	Barro Preto (Belo Horizonte)

March 18, 1945	Atlético	2–1	Cruzeiro	Lourdes (Belo Horizonte)

March 23, 1945	Atlético	1–2	Cruzeiro	Lourdes (Belo Horizonte)

April 5, 1945	Atlético	1–0	Cruzeiro	Lourdes (Belo Horizonte)

May 20, 1945	Atlético	2–4	Cruzeiro	Alameda (Belo Horizonte)

June 13, 1945	Atlético	2–4	Cruzeiro	Lourdes (Belo Horizonte)

September 16, 1945	Atlético	2–3	Cruzeiro	Lourdes (Belo Horizonte)

October 28, 1945	Atlético	3–0	Cruzeiro	JK (Belo Horizonte)

December 23, 1945	Atlético	3–1	Cruzeiro	Alameda (Belo Horizonte)

May 12, 1946	Atlético	2–0	Cruzeiro	Lourdes (Belo Horizonte)

August 4, 1946	Atlético	2–2	Cruzeiro	JK (Belo Horizonte)

August 20, 1946	Atlético	2–2	Cruzeiro	JK (Belo Horizonte)

September 22, 1946	Atlético	2–0	Cruzeiro	Alameda (Belo Horizonte)

November 15, 1946	Atlético	2–0	Cruzeiro	Lourdes (Belo Horizonte)

December 2, 1946	Atlético	1–0	Cruzeiro	JK (Belo Horizonte)

January 15, 1947	Atlético	2–2	Cruzeiro	Lourdes (Belo Horizonte)

February 23, 1947	Atlético	0–2	Cruzeiro	JK (Belo Horizonte)

March 2, 1947	Atlético	3–1	Cruzeiro	Lourdes (Belo Horizonte)

March 13, 1947	Atlético	2–1	Cruzeiro	Lourdes (Belo Horizonte)

April 21, 1947	Atlético	2–1	Cruzeiro	Alameda (Belo Horizonte)

June 15, 1947	Atlético	1–0	Cruzeiro	JK (Belo Horizonte)

July 9, 1947	Atlético	1–1	Cruzeiro	Lourdes (Belo Horizonte)

July 13, 1947	Atlético	1–0	Cruzeiro	JK (Belo Horizonte)

October 19, 1947	Atlético	3–1	Cruzeiro	Lourdes (Belo Horizonte)

December 7, 1947	Atlético	6–2	Cruzeiro	Lourdes (Belo Horizonte)

April 8, 1948	Atlético	3–2	Cruzeiro	JK (Belo Horizonte)

April 13, 1948	Atlético	5–1	Cruzeiro	JK (Belo Horizonte)

June 20, 1948	Atlético	1–2	Cruzeiro	Lourdes (Belo Horizonte)

August 22, 1948	Atlético	0–1	Cruzeiro	JK (Belo Horizonte)

November 14, 1948	Atlético	2–2	Cruzeiro	Alameda (Belo Horizonte)

January 20, 1949	Atlético	0–0	Cruzeiro	Lourdes (Belo Horizonte)

February 4, 1949	Atlético	2–1	Cruzeiro	JK (Belo Horizonte)

March 26, 1949	Atlético	5–2	Cruzeiro	Alameda (Belo Horizonte)

June 5, 1949	Atlético	3–1	Cruzeiro	Lourdes (Belo Horizonte)

July 3, 1949	Atlético	1–3	Cruzeiro	JK (Belo Horizonte)

July 31, 1949	Atlético	1–2	Cruzeiro	JK (Belo Horizonte)

September 4, 1949	Atlético	4–2	Cruzeiro	Lourdes (Belo Horizonte)

November 6, 1949	Atlético	1–1	Cruzeiro	Alameda (Belo Horizonte)

June 18, 1950	Atlético	1–3	Cruzeiro	Lourdes (Belo Horizonte)

June 22, 1950	Atlético	0–2	Cruzeiro	JK (Belo Horizonte)

July 30, 1950	Atlético	2–0	Cruzeiro	JK (Belo Horizonte)

October 19, 1950	Atlético	2–1	Cruzeiro	Lourdes (Belo Horizonte)

March 1, 1951	Atlético	3–0	Cruzeiro	Alameda (Belo Horizonte)

April 3, 1951	Atlético	1–2	Cruzeiro	Alameda (Belo Horizonte)

May 13, 1951	Atlético	1–1	Cruzeiro	Lourdes (Belo Horizonte)

May 17, 1951	Atlético	2–1	Cruzeiro	JK (Belo Horizonte)

July 8, 1951	Atlético	2–1	Cruzeiro	JK (Belo Horizonte)

June 16, 1951	Atlético	3–1	Cruzeiro	JK (Belo Horizonte)

December 30, 1951	Atlético	2–1	Cruzeiro	Lourdes (Belo Horizonte)

March 16, 1952	Atlético	4–3	Cruzeiro	Lourdes (Belo Horizonte)

March 23, 1952	Atlético	2–4	Cruzeiro	JK (Belo Horizonte)

May 22, 1952	Atlético	0–3	Cruzeiro	Alameda (Belo Horizonte)

June 25, 1952	Atlético	0–4	Cruzeiro	Alameda (Belo Horizonte)

October 12, 1952	Atlético	4–0	Cruzeiro	Lourdes (Belo Horizonte)

November 6, 1952	Atlético	2–2	Cruzeiro	JK (Belo Horizonte)

December 7, 1952	Atlético	1–0	Cruzeiro	JK (Belo Horizonte)

June 21, 1953	Atlético	5–0	Cruzeiro	Lourdes (Belo Horizonte)

July 9, 1953	Atlético	2–2	Cruzeiro	Alameda (Belo Horizonte)

August 30, 1953	Atlético	2–2	Cruzeiro	JK (Belo Horizonte)

February 27, 1954	Atlético	3–3	Cruzeiro	JK (Belo Horizonte)

March 25, 1954	Atlético	0–1	Cruzeiro	Lourdes (Belo Horizonte)

July 25, 1954	Atlético	1–0	Cruzeiro	Independência (Belo Horizonte)

September 5, 1954	Atlético	1–0	Cruzeiro	Independência (Belo Horizonte)

September 12, 1954	Atlético	1–1	Cruzeiro	Independência (Belo Horizonte)

September 16, 1954	Atlético	1–0	Cruzeiro	Independência (Belo Horizonte)

December 5, 1954	Atlético	1–0	Cruzeiro	Independência (Belo Horizonte)

December 9, 1954	Atlético	2–1	Cruzeiro	Alameda (Belo Horizonte)

December 12, 1954	Atlético	1–3	Cruzeiro	Independência (Belo Horizonte)

December 19, 1954	Atlético	0–0	Cruzeiro	Independência (Belo Horizonte)

January 30, 1955	Atlético	0–1	Cruzeiro	Alameda (Belo Horizonte)

April 17, 1955	Atlético	2–0	Cruzeiro	Independência (Belo Horizonte)

April 22, 1955	Atlético	3–0	Cruzeiro	Independência (Belo Horizonte)

April 24, 1955	Atlético	1–1	Cruzeiro	Independência (Belo Horizonte)

May 1, 1955	Atlético	2–0	Cruzeiro	Independência (Belo Horizonte)

August 7, 1955	Atlético	2–1	Cruzeiro	Independência (Belo Horizonte)

November 27, 1955	Atlético	2–2	Cruzeiro	Independência (Belo Horizonte)

June 29, 1956	Atlético	1–1	Cruzeiro	Lourdes (Belo Horizonte)

July 5, 1956	Atlético	0–0	Cruzeiro	JK (Belo Horizonte)

September 16, 1956	Atlético	2–0	Cruzeiro	Independência (Belo Horizonte)

October 14, 1956	Atlético	0–2	Cruzeiro	Independência (Belo Horizonte)

October 18, 1956	Atlético	1–0	Cruzeiro	Independência (Belo Horizonte)

October 21, 1956	Atlético	3–2	Cruzeiro	Independência (Belo Horizonte)

January 10, 1957	Atlético	0–0	Cruzeiro	JK (Belo Horizonte)

April 21, 1957	Atlético	1–3	Cruzeiro	Independência (Belo Horizonte)

May 23, 1957	Atlético	1–1	Cruzeiro	Independência (Belo Horizonte)

May 26, 1957	Atlético	0–0	Cruzeiro	Independência (Belo Horizonte)

June 2, 1957	Atlético	1–0	Cruzeiro	Independência (Belo Horizonte)

August 25, 1957	Atlético	0–1	Cruzeiro	Independência (Belo Horizonte)

November 23, 1957	Atlético	1–0	Cruzeiro	Independência (Belo Horizonte)

January 19, 1958	Atlético	0–1	Cruzeiro	Lourdes (Belo Horizonte)

January 23, 1958	Atlético	0–2	Cruzeiro	JK (Belo Horizonte)

March 30, 1958	Atlético	2–2	Cruzeiro	Independência (Belo Horizonte)

June 29, 1958	Atlético	5–2	Cruzeiro	Independência (Belo Horizonte)

December 7, 1958	Atlético	3–0	Cruzeiro	Independência (Belo Horizonte)

March 1, 1959	Atlético	0–1	Cruzeiro	Independência (Belo Horizonte)

May 3, 1959	Atlético	3–0	Cruzeiro	Independência (Belo Horizonte)

August 16, 1959	Atlético	0–1	Cruzeiro	Independência (Belo Horizonte)

October 4, 1959	Atlético	3–1	Cruzeiro	Independência (Belo Horizonte)

January 24, 1960	Atlético	1–2	Cruzeiro	Independência (Belo Horizonte)

February 21, 1960	Atlético	2–3	Cruzeiro	Independência (Belo Horizonte)

June 12, 1960	Atlético	1–1	Cruzeiro	Independência (Belo Horizonte)

June 16, 1960	Atlético	2–2	Cruzeiro	Israel Pinheiro (Brasília/DF)

September 25, 1960	Atlético	2–0	Cruzeiro	Independência (Belo Horizonte)

December 23, 1960	Atlético	4–0	Cruzeiro	Alameda (Belo Horizonte)

January 22, 1961	Atlético	0–0	Cruzeiro	Independência (Belo Horizonte)

March 12, 1961	Atlético	2–2	Cruzeiro	Independência (Belo Horizonte)

April 25, 1961	Atlético	1–1	Cruzeiro	Lourdes (Belo Horizonte)

May 21, 1961	Atlético	2–1	Cruzeiro	Independência (Belo Horizonte)

June 8, 1961	Atlético	1–1	Cruzeiro	Alameda (Belo Horizonte)

June 25, 1961	Atlético	0–2	Cruzeiro	Independência (Belo Horizonte)

August 13, 1961	Atlético	2–0	Cruzeiro	Independência (Belo Horizonte)

November 26, 1961	Atlético	2–1	Cruzeiro	Independência (Belo Horizonte)

December 21, 1961	Atlético	0–2	Cruzeiro	Independência (Belo Horizonte)

March 25, 1962	Atlético	0–2	Cruzeiro	Independência (Belo Horizonte)

April 22, 1962	Atlético	3–0	Cruzeiro	Independência (Belo Horizonte)

May 6, 1962	Atlético	2–0	Cruzeiro	Independência (Belo Horizonte)

September 9, 1962	Atlético	2–0	Cruzeiro	Independência (Belo Horizonte)

December 16, 1962	Atlético	1–0	Cruzeiro	Independência (Belo Horizonte)

February 10, 1963	Atlético	0–1	Cruzeiro	Independência (Belo Horizonte)

February 13, 1963	Atlético	2–1	Cruzeiro	Independência (Belo Horizonte)

February 15, 1963	Atlético	2–1	Cruzeiro	Independência (Belo Horizonte)

June 23, 1963	Atlético	1–0	Cruzeiro	Independência (Belo Horizonte)

September 15, 1963	Atlético	1–0	Cruzeiro	Independência (Belo Horizonte)

December 1, 1963	Atlético	1–1	Cruzeiro	Independência (Belo Horizonte)

February 2, 1964	Atlético	1–3	Cruzeiro	Independência (Belo Horizonte)

August 2, 1964	Atlético	1–0	Cruzeiro	Independência (Belo Horizonte)

November 15, 1964	Atlético	0–1	Cruzeiro	Independência (Belo Horizonte)

April 22, 1965	Atlético	0–1	Cruzeiro	Independência (Belo Horizonte)

May 9, 1965	Atlético	2–3	Cruzeiro	Independência (Belo Horizonte)

June 20, 1965	Atlético	1–3	Cruzeiro	Independência (Belo Horizonte)

October 24, 1965	Atlético	0–1	Cruzeiro	Mineirão (Belo Horizonte)

December 16, 1965	Atlético	0–2	Cruzeiro	Mineirão (Belo Horizonte)

February 9, 1966	Atlético	1–2	Cruzeiro	Mineirão (Belo Horizonte)

June 26, 1966	Atlético	3–2	Cruzeiro	Mineirão (Belo Horizonte)

June 29, 1966	Atlético	0–0	Cruzeiro	Mineirão (Belo Horizonte)

September 18, 1966	Atlético	0–2	Cruzeiro	Mineirão (Belo Horizonte)

December 11, 1966	Atlético	1–1	Cruzeiro	Mineirão (Belo Horizonte)

March 5, 1967	Atlético	0–4	Cruzeiro	Mineirão (Belo Horizonte)

September 10, 1967	Atlético	0–0	Cruzeiro	Mineirão (Belo Horizonte)

November 26, 1967	Atlético	3–3	Cruzeiro	Mineirão (Belo Horizonte)

January 14, 1968	Atlético	1–3	Cruzeiro	Mineirão (Belo Horizonte)

January 21, 1968	Atlético	0–3	Cruzeiro	Mineirão (Belo Horizonte)

June 2, 1968	Atlético	1–2	Cruzeiro	Mineirão (Belo Horizonte)

September 8, 1968	Atlético	1–1	Cruzeiro	Mineirão (Belo Horizonte)

October 27, 1968	Atlético	1–0	Cruzeiro	Mineirão (Belo Horizonte)

May 4, 1969	Atlético	0–1	Cruzeiro	Mineirão (Belo Horizonte)

June 8, 1969	Atlético	0–1	Cruzeiro	Mineirão (Belo Horizonte)

September 28, 1969	Atlético	1–2	Cruzeiro	Mineirão (Belo Horizonte)

February 1, 1970	Atlético	2–1	Cruzeiro	Mineirão (Belo Horizonte)

May 30, 1970	Atlético	2–2	Cruzeiro	Mineirão (Belo Horizonte)

August 2, 1970	Atlético	2–1	Cruzeiro	Mineirão (Belo Horizonte)

September 20, 1970	Atlético	1–1	Cruzeiro	Mineirão (Belo Horizonte)

October 25, 1970	Atlético	1–1	Cruzeiro	Mineirão (Belo Horizonte)

December 13, 1970	Atlético	1–1	Cruzeiro	Mineirão (Belo Horizonte)

March 7, 1971	Atlético	0–0	Cruzeiro	Mineirão (Belo Horizonte)

May 2, 1971	Atlético	1–0	Cruzeiro	Mineirão (Belo Horizonte)

June 27, 1971	Atlético	1–0	Cruzeiro	Mineirão (Belo Horizonte)

October 10, 1971	Atlético	1–1	Cruzeiro	Mineirão (Belo Horizonte)

February 5, 1972	Atlético	1–3	Cruzeiro	Mineirão (Belo Horizonte)

March 12, 1972	Atlético	0–0	Cruzeiro	Mineirão (Belo Horizonte)

May 21, 1972	Atlético	1–1	Cruzeiro	Mineirão (Belo Horizonte)

August 6, 1972	Atlético	0–1	Cruzeiro	Mineirão (Belo Horizonte)

August 20, 1972	Atlético	0–0	Cruzeiro	Mineirão (Belo Horizonte)

September 3, 1972	Atlético	1–1	Cruzeiro	Mineirão (Belo Horizonte)

September 7, 1972	Atlético	1–2	Cruzeiro	Mineirão (Belo Horizonte)

November 12, 1972	Atlético	0–0	Cruzeiro	Mineirão (Belo Horizonte)

February 25, 1973	Atlético	1–0	Cruzeiro	Mineirão (Belo Horizonte)

March 18, 1973	Atlético	0–2	Cruzeiro	Mineirão (Belo Horizonte)

March 25, 1973	Atlético	1–3	Cruzeiro	Mineirão (Belo Horizonte)

May 20, 1973	Atlético	2–0	Cruzeiro	Mineirão (Belo Horizonte)

June 17, 1973	Atlético	0–1	Cruzeiro	Mineirão (Belo Horizonte)

August 5, 1973	Atlético	0–1	Cruzeiro	Mineirão (Belo Horizonte)

August 19, 1973	Atlético	0–1	Cruzeiro	Mineirão (Belo Horizonte)

November 11, 1973	Atlético	0–0	Cruzeiro	Mineirão (Belo Horizonte)

March 3, 1974	Atlético	3–1	Cruzeiro	Mineirão (Belo Horizonte)

March 24, 1974	Atlético	2–1	Cruzeiro	Mineirão (Belo Horizonte)

September 8, 1974	Atlético	1–1	Cruzeiro	Mineirão (Belo Horizonte)

September 29, 1974	Atlético	0–1	Cruzeiro	Mineirão (Belo Horizonte)

November 10, 1974	Atlético	0–0	Cruzeiro	Mineirão (Belo Horizonte)

December 15, 1974	Atlético	1–2	Cruzeiro	Mineirão (Belo Horizonte)

April 20, 1975	Atlético	2–2	Cruzeiro	Mineirão (Belo Horizonte)

July 6, 1975	Atlético	1–0	Cruzeiro	Mineirão (Belo Horizonte)

July 25, 1975	Atlético	1–0	Cruzeiro	Mineirão (Belo Horizonte)

September 7, 1975	Atlético	2–2	Cruzeiro	Mineirão (Belo Horizonte)

January 18, 1976	Atlético	2–1	Cruzeiro	Mineirão (Belo Horizonte)

January 25, 1976	Atlético	2–1	Cruzeiro	Mineirão (Belo Horizonte)

February 8, 1976	Atlético	0–1	Cruzeiro	Mineirão (Belo Horizonte)

February 22, 1976	Atlético	0–1	Cruzeiro	Mineirão (Belo Horizonte)

April 25, 1976	Atlético	2–1	Cruzeiro	Mineirão (Belo Horizonte)

July 4, 1976	Atlético	1–0	Cruzeiro	Mineirão (Belo Horizonte)

July 25, 1976	Atlético	1–1	Cruzeiro	Mineirão (Belo Horizonte)

February 26, 1977	Atlético	1–2	Cruzeiro	Mineirão (Belo Horizonte)

March 12, 1977	Atlético	2–1	Cruzeiro	Mineirão (Belo Horizonte)

March 27, 1977	Atlético	2–0	Cruzeiro	Mineirão (Belo Horizonte)

April 3, 1977	Atlético	2–0	Cruzeiro	Mineirão (Belo Horizonte)

May 29, 1977	Atlético	3–0	Cruzeiro	Mineirão (Belo Horizonte)

August 7, 1977	Atlético	0–0	Cruzeiro	Mineirão (Belo Horizonte)

September 25, 1977	Atlético	1–0	Cruzeiro	Mineirão (Belo Horizonte)

October 2, 1977	Atlético	2–3	Cruzeiro	Mineirão (Belo Horizonte)

October 9, 1977	Atlético	1–3	Cruzeiro	Mineirão (Belo Horizonte)

November 6, 1977	Atlético	1–0	Cruzeiro	Mineirão (Belo Horizonte)

January 29, 1978	Atlético	2–1	Cruzeiro	Mineirão (Belo Horizonte)

April 23, 1978	Atlético	0–2	Cruzeiro	Mineirão (Belo Horizonte)

May 21, 1978	Atlético	0–0	Cruzeiro	Mineirão (Belo Horizonte)

October 22, 1978	Atlético	1–1	Cruzeiro	Mineirão (Belo Horizonte)

December 17, 1978	Atlético	0–0	Cruzeiro	Mineirão (Belo Horizonte)

February 18, 1979	Atlético	2–1	Cruzeiro	Mineirão (Belo Horizonte)

March 18, 1979	Atlético	0–0	Cruzeiro	Mineirão (Belo Horizonte)

May 27, 1979	Atlético	0–0	Cruzeiro	Mineirão (Belo Horizonte)

July 22, 1979	Atlético	0–1	Cruzeiro	Mineirão (Belo Horizonte)

July 29, 1979	Atlético	0–1	Cruzeiro	Mineirão (Belo Horizonte)

August 1, 1979	Atlético	1–1	Cruzeiro	Mineirão (Belo Horizonte)

August 5, 1979	Atlético	1–0	Cruzeiro	Mineirão (Belo Horizonte)

August 26, 1979	Atlético	3–0	Cruzeiro	Mineirão (Belo Horizonte)

September 9, 1979	Atlético	0–0	Cruzeiro	Mineirão (Belo Horizonte)

October 7, 1979	Atlético	1–1	Cruzeiro	Mineirão (Belo Horizonte)

December 2, 1979	Atlético	0–0	Cruzeiro	Mineirão (Belo Horizonte)

October 26, 1980	Atlético	1–0	Cruzeiro	Mineirão (Belo Horizonte)

November 30, 1980	Atlético	2–0	Cruzeiro	Mineirão (Belo Horizonte)

June 28, 1981	Atlético	0–0	Cruzeiro	Mineirão (Belo Horizonte)

October 11, 1981	Atlético	0–1	Cruzeiro	Mineirão (Belo Horizonte)

November 8, 1981	Atlético	1–1	Cruzeiro	Mineirão (Belo Horizonte)

November 29, 1981	Atlético	2–0	Cruzeiro	Mineirão (Belo Horizonte)

May 2, 1982	Atlético	2–2	Cruzeiro	Mineirão (Belo Horizonte)

May 23, 1982	Atlético	0–0	Cruzeiro	Mineirão (Belo Horizonte)

September 5, 1982	Atlético	0–0	Cruzeiro	Mineirão (Belo Horizonte)

October 17, 1982	Atlético	2–1	Cruzeiro	Mineirão (Belo Horizonte)

November 7, 1982	Atlético	0–1	Cruzeiro	Mineirão (Belo Horizonte)

December 5, 1982	Atlético	2–1	Cruzeiro	Mineirão (Belo Horizonte)

July 24, 1983	Atlético	0–0	Cruzeiro	Mineirão (Belo Horizonte)

October 2, 1983	Atlético	2–2	Cruzeiro	Mineirão (Belo Horizonte)

October 9, 1983	Atlético	0–1	Cruzeiro	Mineirão (Belo Horizonte)

October 12, 1983	Atlético	2–0	Cruzeiro	Mineirão (Belo Horizonte)

October 16, 1983	Atlético	4–0	Cruzeiro	Mineirão (Belo Horizonte)

November 13, 1983	Atlético	3–2	Cruzeiro	Mineirão (Belo Horizonte)

December 11, 1983	Atlético	1–4	Cruzeiro	Mineirão (Belo Horizonte)

April 15, 1984	Atlético	2–4	Cruzeiro	Mineirão (Belo Horizonte)

July 29, 1984	Atlético	0–1	Cruzeiro	Mineirão (Belo Horizonte)

November 11, 1984	Atlético	1–1	Cruzeiro	Mineirão (Belo Horizonte)

December 5, 1984	Atlético	0–4	Cruzeiro	Mineirão (Belo Horizonte)

December 16, 1984	Atlético	1–0	Cruzeiro	Mineirão (Belo Horizonte)

March 3, 1985	Atlético	2–0	Cruzeiro	Mineirão (Belo Horizonte)

April 10, 1985	Atlético	2–3	Cruzeiro	Mineirão (Belo Horizonte)

September 1, 1985	Atlético	3–1	Cruzeiro	Mineirão (Belo Horizonte)

September 15, 1985	Atlético	1–1	Cruzeiro	Mineirão (Belo Horizonte)

September 25, 1985	Atlético	0–0	Cruzeiro	Mineirão (Belo Horizonte)

October 27, 1985	Atlético	1–1	Cruzeiro	Mineirão (Belo Horizonte)

November 17, 1985	Atlético	0–0	Cruzeiro	Mineirão (Belo Horizonte)

December 1, 1985	Atlético	3–1	Cruzeiro	Mineirão (Belo Horizonte)

December 8, 1985	Atlético	0–0	Cruzeiro	Mineirão (Belo Horizonte)

December 11, 1985	Atlético	2–2	Cruzeiro	Mineirão (Belo Horizonte)

December 15, 1985	Atlético	1–0	Cruzeiro	Mineirão (Belo Horizonte)

March 2, 1986	Atlético	2–0	Cruzeiro	Mineirão (Belo Horizonte)

April 27, 1986	Atlético	1–0	Cruzeiro	Mineirão (Belo Horizonte)

February 8, 1987	Atlético	0–0	Cruzeiro	Mineirão (Belo Horizonte)

February 11, 1987	Atlético	1–1	Cruzeiro	Mineirão (Belo Horizonte)

May 3, 1987	Atlético	0–1	Cruzeiro	Mineirão (Belo Horizonte)

May 10, 1987	Atlético	3–2	Cruzeiro	Mineirão (Belo Horizonte)

July 5, 1987	Atlético	1–2	Cruzeiro	Mineirão (Belo Horizonte)

July 29, 1987	Atlético	0–0	Cruzeiro	Mineirão (Belo Horizonte)

August 2, 1987	Atlético	0–2	Cruzeiro	Mineirão (Belo Horizonte)

October 11, 1987	Atlético	0–0	Cruzeiro	Mineirão (Belo Horizonte)

November 8, 1987	Atlético	4–1	Cruzeiro	Ipatingão (Ipatinga/MG)

April 3, 1988	Atlético	1–2	Cruzeiro	Mineirão (Belo Horizonte)

July 10, 1988	Atlético	1–0	Cruzeiro	Mineirão (Belo Horizonte)

September 4, 1988	Atlético	0–0	Cruzeiro	Mineirão (Belo Horizonte)

April 23, 1989	Atlético	0–1	Cruzeiro	Mineirão (Belo Horizonte)

June 11, 1989	Atlético	1–0	Cruzeiro	Mineirão (Belo Horizonte)

July 9, 1989	Atlético	3–0	Cruzeiro	Mineirão (Belo Horizonte)

December 10, 1989	Atlético	0–1	Cruzeiro	Mineirão (Belo Horizonte)

April 1, 1990	Atlético	1–3	Cruzeiro	Mineirão (Belo Horizonte)

May 27, 1990	Atlético	2–1	Cruzeiro	Mineirão (Belo Horizonte)

June 3, 1990	Atlético	0–1	Cruzeiro	Mineirão (Belo Horizonte)

September 30, 1990	Atlético	2–0	Cruzeiro	Mineirão (Belo Horizonte)

February 17, 1991	Atlético	2–2	Cruzeiro	Mineirão (Belo Horizonte)

November 24, 1991	Atlético	2–0	Cruzeiro	Mineirão (Belo Horizonte)

December 15, 1991	Atlético	1–0	Cruzeiro	Mineirão (Belo Horizonte)

March 29, 1992	Atlético	2–0	Cruzeiro	Mineirão (Belo Horizonte)

April 18, 1993	Atlético	1–2	Cruzeiro	Mineirão (Belo Horizonte)

June 13, 1993	Atlético	1–0	Cruzeiro	Mineirão (Belo Horizonte)

June 27, 1993	Atlético	0–1	Cruzeiro	Mineirão (Belo Horizonte)

July 8, 1993	Atlético	0–0	Cruzeiro	Mineirão (Belo Horizonte)

July 28, 1993	Atlético	1–2	Cruzeiro	Mineirão (Belo Horizonte)

March 6, 1994	Atlético	1–3	Cruzeiro	Mineirão (Belo Horizonte)

May 1, 1994	Atlético	1–1	Cruzeiro	Mineirão (Belo Horizonte)

June 14, 1994	Atlético	0–1	Cruzeiro	Mineirão (Belo Horizonte)

October 23, 1994	Atlético	1–0	Cruzeiro	Mineirão (Belo Horizonte)

November 23, 1994	Atlético	1–0	Cruzeiro	Mineirão (Belo Horizonte)

April 2, 1995	Atlético	1–2	Cruzeiro	Mineirão (Belo Horizonte)

June 4, 1995	Atlético	3–1	Cruzeiro	Mineirão (Belo Horizonte)

August 10, 1995	Atlético	1–1	Cruzeiro	Independência (Belo Horizonte)

October 12, 1995	Atlético	2–0	Cruzeiro	Mineirão (Belo Horizonte)

April 7, 1996	Atlético	2–1	Cruzeiro	Mendes Brito (Ipatinga/MG)

May 26, 1996	Atlético	0–0	Cruzeiro	Mineirão (Belo Horizonte)

June 30, 1996	Atlético	1–0	Cruzeiro	Mineirão (Belo Horizonte)

July 14, 1996	Atlético	0–2	Cruzeiro	Mineirão (Belo Horizonte)

November 3, 1996	Atlético	1–2	Cruzeiro	Mineirão (Belo Horizonte)

March 16, 1997	Atlético	1–1	Cruzeiro	Mineirão (Belo Horizonte)

May 11, 1997	Atlético	0–0	Cruzeiro	Mineirão (Belo Horizonte)

August 9, 1997	Atlético	2–1	Cruzeiro	Mineirão (Belo Horizonte)

July 20, 1997	Atlético	2–1	Cruzeiro	Mineirão (Belo Horizonte)

March 8, 1998	Atlético	1–2	Cruzeiro	Mineirão (Belo Horizonte)

June 7, 1998	Atlético	2–3	Cruzeiro	Mineirão (Belo Horizonte)

June 11, 1998	Atlético	0–0	Cruzeiro	Mineirão (Belo Horizonte)

July 26, 1998	Atlético	1–1	Cruzeiro	Mineirão (Belo Horizonte)

March 7, 1999	Atlético	2–3	Cruzeiro	Mineirão (Belo Horizonte)

March 28, 1999	Atlético	0–3	Cruzeiro	Mineirão (Belo Horizonte)

April 4, 1999	Atlético	1–5	Cruzeiro	Mineirão (Belo Horizonte)

May 16, 1999	Atlético	1–1	Cruzeiro	Mineirão (Belo Horizonte)

June 20, 1999	Atlético	2–0	Cruzeiro	Mineirão (Belo Horizonte)

October 3, 1999	Atlético	0–3	Cruzeiro	Mineirão (Belo Horizonte)

November 14, 1999	Atlético	4–2	Cruzeiro	Mineirão (Belo Horizonte)

November 21, 1999	Atlético	3–2	Cruzeiro	Mineirão (Belo Horizonte)

April 23, 2000	Atlético	4–2	Cruzeiro	Mineirão (Belo Horizonte)

May 27, 2000	Atlético	0–2	Cruzeiro	Mineirão (Belo Horizonte)

June 3, 2000	Atlético	2–1	Cruzeiro	Mineirão (Belo Horizonte)

June 8, 2000	Atlético	1–1	Cruzeiro	Mineirão (Belo Horizonte)

September 30, 2000	Atlético	2–4	Cruzeiro	Mineirão (Belo Horizonte)

February 28, 2001	Atlético	1–1	Cruzeiro	Ipatingão (Ipatinga/MG)

March 3, 2001	Atlético	1–1	Cruzeiro	Mineirão (Belo Horizonte)

March 10, 2001	Atlético	1–3	Cruzeiro	Mineirão (Belo Horizonte)

October 6, 2001	Atlético	2–2	Cruzeiro	Mineirão (Belo Horizonte)

February 23, 2002	Atlético	1–1	Cruzeiro	Mineirão (Belo Horizonte)

April 21, 2002	Atlético	1–1	Cruzeiro	Mineirão (Belo Horizonte)

April 28, 2002	Atlético	1–1	Cruzeiro	Mineirão (Belo Horizonte)

May 26, 2002	Atlético	0–1	Cruzeiro	Mineirão (Belo Horizonte)

October 20, 2002	Atlético	2–1	Cruzeiro	Mineirão (Belo Horizonte)

February 15, 2003	Atlético	2–4	Cruzeiro	Mineirão (Belo Horizonte)

June 15, 2003	Atlético	0–0	Cruzeiro	Mineirão (Belo Horizonte)

October 12, 2003	Atlético	0–1	Cruzeiro	Mineirão (Belo Horizonte)

February 29, 2004	Atlético	5–3	Cruzeiro	Mineirão (Belo Horizonte)

April 11, 2004	Atlético	1–3	Cruzeiro	Mineirão (Belo Horizonte)

April 18, 2004	Atlético	1–0	Cruzeiro	Mineirão (Belo Horizonte)

July 10, 2004	Atlético	2–0	Cruzeiro	Mineirão (Belo Horizonte)

October 23, 2004	Atlético	3–0	Cruzeiro	Mineirão (Belo Horizonte)

February 20, 2005	Atlético	2–0	Cruzeiro	Mineirão (Belo Horizonte)

March 26, 2005	Atlético	0–1	Cruzeiro	Mineirão (Belo Horizonte)

April 3, 2005	Atlético	0–0	Cruzeiro	Mendes Brito (Ipatinga/MG)

July 10, 2005	Atlético	1–2	Cruzeiro	Mineirão (Belo Horizonte)

October 16, 2005	Atlético	0–1	Cruzeiro	Mineirão (Belo Horizonte)

February 5, 2006	Atlético	1–1	Cruzeiro	Mineirão (Belo Horizonte)

March 19, 2006	Atlético	2–2	Cruzeiro	Mineirão (Belo Horizonte)

March 26, 2006	Atlético	0–2	Cruzeiro	Mineirão (Belo Horizonte)

February 10, 2007	Atlético	3–1	Cruzeiro	Mineirão (Belo Horizonte)

April 29, 2007	Atlético	4–0	Cruzeiro	Mineirão (Belo Horizonte)

May 6, 2007	Atlético	0–2	Cruzeiro	Mineirão (Belo Horizonte)

June 24, 2007	Atlético	2–4	Cruzeiro	Mineirão (Belo Horizonte)

September 16, 2007	Atlético	3–4	Cruzeiro	Mineirão (Belo Horizonte)

March 9, 2008	Atlético	0–0	Cruzeiro	Mineirão (Belo Horizonte)

April 27, 2008	Atlético	0–5	Cruzeiro	Mineirão (Belo Horizonte)

May 4, 2008	Atlético	0–1	Cruzeiro	Mineirão (Belo Horizonte)

July 13, 2008	Atlético	1–2	Cruzeiro	Mineirão (Belo Horizonte)

October 19, 2008	Atlético	0–2	Cruzeiro	Mineirão (Belo Horizonte)

January 17, 2009	Atlético	2–4	Cruzeiro	Centenário (Montevideo/URU)

February 15, 2009	Atlético	1–2	Cruzeiro	Mineirão (Belo Horizonte)

April 26, 2009	Atlético	0–5	Cruzeiro	Mineirão (Belo Horizonte)

May 3, 2009	Atlético	1–1	Cruzeiro	Mineirão (Belo Horizonte)

July 12, 2009	Atlético	3–0	Cruzeiro	Mineirão (Belo Horizonte)

October 12, 2009	Atlético	0–1	Cruzeiro	Mineirão (Belo Horizonte)

February 20, 2010	Atlético	1–3	Cruzeiro	Mineirão (Belo Horizonte)

August 1, 2010	Atlético	0–1	Cruzeiro	Arena do Jacaré (Sete Lagoas/MG)

October 24, 2010	Atlético	4–3	Cruzeiro	Parque do Sabiá (Uberlândia/MG)

February 12, 2011	Atlético	4–3	Cruzeiro	Arena do Jacaré (Sete Lagoas/MG)

May 8, 2011	Atlético	2–1	Cruzeiro	Arena do Jacaré (Sete Lagoas/MG)

May 15, 2011	Atlético	0–2	Cruzeiro	Arena do Jacaré (Sete Lagoas/MG)

August 28, 2011	Atlético	1–2	Cruzeiro	Arena do Jacaré (Sete Lagoas/MG)

December 4, 2011	Atlético	1–6	Cruzeiro	Arena do Jacaré (Sete Lagoas/MG)

April 8, 2012	Atlético	2–2	Cruzeiro	Arena do Jacaré (Sete Lagoas/MG)

August 26, 2012	Atlético	2–2	Cruzeiro	Independência (Belo Horizonte)

December 2, 2012	Atlético	3–2	Cruzeiro	Independência (Belo Horizonte)

February 3, 2013	Atlético	1–2	Cruzeiro	Mineirão (Belo Horizonte)

May 12, 2013	Atlético	3–0	Cruzeiro	Independência (Belo Horizonte)

May 19, 2013	Atlético	1–2	Cruzeiro	Mineirão (Belo Horizonte)

July 28, 2013	Atlético	1–4	Cruzeiro	Mineirão (Belo Horizonte)

October 13, 2013	Atlético	1–0	Cruzeiro	Independência (Belo Horizonte)

February 16, 2014	Atlético	0–0	Cruzeiro	Independência (Belo Horizonte)

April 6, 2014	Atlético	0–0	Cruzeiro	Independência (Belo Horizonte)

April 13, 2014	Atlético	0–0	Cruzeiro	Mineirão (Belo Horizonte)

May 11, 2014	Atlético	2–1	Cruzeiro	Independência (Belo Horizonte)

September 21, 2014	Atlético	3–2	Cruzeiro	Mineirão (Belo Horizonte)

November 12, 2014	Atlético	2–0	Cruzeiro	Independência (Belo Horizonte)

November 26, 2014	Atlético	1–0	Cruzeiro	Mineirão (Belo Horizonte)

March 8, 2015	Atlético	1–1	Cruzeiro	Mineirão (Belo Horizonte)

April 12, 2015	Atlético	1–1	Cruzeiro	Independência (Belo Horizonte)

April 19, 2015	Atlético	2–1	Cruzeiro	Mineirão (Belo Horizonte)

June 6, 2015	Atlético	1–3	Cruzeiro	Independência (Belo Horizonte)

September 13, 2015	Atlético	1–1	Cruzeiro	Mineirão (Belo Horizonte)

March 27, 2016	Atlético	0–1	Cruzeiro	Independência (Belo Horizonte)

June 12, 2016	Atlético	2–3	Cruzeiro	Independência (Belo Horizonte)

September 18, 2016	Atlético	1–1	Cruzeiro	Mineirão (Belo Horizonte)

February 1, 2017	Atlético	0–1	Cruzeiro	Mineirão (Belo Horizonte)

April 1, 2017	Atlético	1–2	Cruzeiro	Mineirão (Belo Horizonte)

April 30, 2017	Atlético	0–0	Cruzeiro	Mineirão (Belo Horizonte)

May 7, 2017	Atlético	2–1	Cruzeiro	Independência (Belo Horizonte)

July 2, 2017	Atlético	3–1	Cruzeiro	Independência (Belo Horizonte)

October 22, 2017	Atlético	3–1	Cruzeiro	Mineirão (Belo Horizonte)

March 4, 2018	Atlético	0–1	Cruzeiro	Independência (Belo Horizonte)

April 1, 2018	Atlético	3–1	Cruzeiro	Independência (Belo Horizonte)

April 8, 2018	Atlético	0–2	Cruzeiro	Mineirão (Belo Horizonte)

May 19, 2018	Atlético	1–0	Cruzeiro	Independência (Belo Horizonte)

September 16, 2018	Atlético	0–0	Cruzeiro	Mineirão (Belo Horizonte)

January 27, 2019	Atlético	1–1	Cruzeiro	Mineirão (Belo Horizonte)

April 14, 2019	Atlético	1–2	Cruzeiro	Mineirão (Belo Horizonte)

April 20, 2019	Atlético	1–1	Cruzeiro	Independência (Belo Horizonte)

July 11, 2019	Atlético	0–3	Cruzeiro	Mineirão (Belo Horizonte)

July 17, 2019	Atlético	2–0	Cruzeiro	Independência (Belo Horizonte)

August 4, 2019	Atlético	2–0	Cruzeiro	Independência (Belo Horizonte)

November 10, 2019	Atlético	0–0	Cruzeiro	Mineirão (Belo Horizonte)

March 7, 2020	Atlético	2–1	Cruzeiro	Mineirão (Belo Horizonte)

April 11, 2021	Atlético	0–1	Cruzeiro	Mineirão (Belo Horizonte)

March 6, 2022	Atlético	2–1	Cruzeiro	Mineirão (Belo Horizonte)

April 2, 2022	Atlético	3–1	Cruzeiro	Mineirão (Belo Horizonte)

February 13, 2023	Atlético	1–1	Cruzeiro	Independência (Belo Horizonte)

June 3, 2023	Atlético	1–0	Cruzeiro	Parque do Sabiá (Uberlândia/MG)

October 22, 2023	Atlético	0–1	Cruzeiro	Arena MRV (Belo Horizonte)

February 3, 2024	Atlético	0–2	Cruzeiro	Arena MRV (Belo Horizonte)

March 30, 2024	Atlético	2–2	Cruzeiro	Arena MRV (Belo Horizonte)

April 7, 2024	Atlético	3–1	Cruzeiro	Mineirão (Belo Horizonte)

April 20, 2024	Atlético	3–0	Cruzeiro	Arena MRV (Belo Horizonte)

August 10, 2024	Atlético	0–0	Cruzeiro	Mineirão (Belo Horizonte)

January 18, 2025	Atlético	0–0	Cruzeiro	Inter&Co Stadium (Orlando/USA)

February 9, 2025	Atlético	2–0	Cruzeiro	Mineirão (Belo Horizonte)

May 18, 2025	Atlético	0–0	Cruzeiro	Mineirão (Belo Horizonte)

August 27, 2025	Atlético	0–2	Cruzeiro	Arena MRV (Belo Horizonte)

September 11, 2025	Atlético	0–2	Cruzeiro	Mineirão (Belo Horizonte)

October 15, 2025	Atlético	1–1	Cruzeiro	Arena MRV (Belo Horizonte)

January 25, 2026	Atlético	2–1	Cruzeiro	Arena MRV (Belo Horizonte)

March 8, 2026	Atlético	0–1	Cruzeiro	Mineirão (Belo Horizonte)

May 2, 2026	Atlético	3–1	Cruzeiro	Mineirão (Belo Horizonte)

August 25, 2026	Atlético	1–1	Cruzeiro	Mineirão (Belo Horizonte)

September 1, 2026	Atlético	2–1	Cruzeiro	Arena MRV (Belo Horizonte)

October 29, 2026	Atlético	0–1	Cruzeiro	Arena MRV (Belo Horizonte)
