= Atlético Mineiro 9–2 Cruzeiro (1927) =

Atlético v Cruzeiro (1927)
- Event: 1927 Campeonato Mineiro
| Atlético Mineiro | Palestra Itália |
| 9 | 2 |
- Date: 27 November 1927
- Venue: América Mineiro ground, Belo Horizonte, Brazil
- Referee: José Avelino (Brazil)
- Attendance: 4,000

Atlético v Cruzeiro (1927) was a state football game played on 27 November 1927. It was the largest win in the history of the Clássico Mineiro, the derby between the 2 biggest clubs of Minas Gerais.

== Details ==
Campeonato Mineiro 27 November
15:30

| Atlético | 9–2 | Palestra Itália |
|---|---|---|
| Said 11', 19', 46'; Mário de Castro 57', 61'; Jairo 66', 71', 76'; Getúlio 82' | Report | Ninão 22', 70' |

Alamêda, Belo Horizonte
Attendance: 4,000
Referee: José Avelino Brazil

| Atlético Mineiro | Palestra Itália |

| GK | 1 | Osvaldo Perigoso |
| RB | 2 | Chiquinho |
| LB | 6 | Carlos Brant |
| CB | 4 | Hugo Jacques |
| CB | 3 | Ivo Melo |
| CM | 5 | Franco |
| CM | 8 | Getulinho |
| RW | 7 | Said |
| LW | 11 | Jairo |
| AM | 10 | Mário de Castro |
| CF | 9 | Getúlio |
Substitutes:
Manager:

| GK | 1 | Geraldo |
| RB | 2 | Rizzo |
| CB | 3 | Pararaio |
| CB | 4 | Porfírio |
| LB | 6 | Osti |
| CM | 5 | Nininho |
| CM | 8 | Piorra |
| RW | 10 | Ninão |
| AM | 7 | Bengala |
| LW | 9 | Armandinho |
| CF | 11 | Odilon |
Substitutes:
Manager:

Man of the Match:
Mário de Castro (Atlético)

Sources: Cruzeiropédia, Superesportes and Placar
