= Elicarlos =

Brazilian footballer (born 1985)

Personal information
- Full name: Elicarlos Souza Santos
- Date of birth: 8 June 1985 (age 41)
- Place of birth: Laranjeiras, Brazil
- Height: 1.76 m (5 ft 9 in)
- Position: Defensive midfielder

Team information
- Current team: Atlético Tubarão

Youth career
- 2004–2005: Porto

Senior career*
Years	Team	Apps	(Gls)
2006	Porto		
2006–2007	→ Náutico (loan)	58	(1)
2008–2010	Cruzeiro	76	(1)
2011–2016	Náutico	194	(10)
2015–2016	→ Chapecoense (loan)	42	(1)
2016–2017	Figueirense	34	(0)
2017	Santa Cruz	28	(0)
2017–2019	Chapecoense	90	(5)
2020–2021	Botafogo-SP	26	(1)
2021	Santa Cruz	8	(1)
2022	Itabaiana	12	(3)
2022	Juazeiro		
2022	Icasa		
2023	Itabaiana	13	(0)
2023	Juazeiro		
2023–	Atlético Tubarão		
- * Club domestic league appearances and goals as of 22 April 2023

Elicarlos Souza Santos (born 8 July 1985), simply known as Elicarlos, is a Brazilian footballer as a defensive midfielder for Atlético Tubarão.

== Career ==
Elicarlos began his career with Porto, starting in the youth team before being promoted to the first-team in 2006. He wasn't with the first-team of Porto long as he agreed to join Náutico on loan for two seasons, he scored once in 34 league matches for Náutico before returning to his parent club. Months after his loan spell at Náutico had ended, Elicarlos was on the move again as he joined Cruzeiro permanently. 33 appearances and one goal followed for him at Cruzeiro, during his time with the club he won the 2008 Campeonato Mineiro and the 2009 Campeonato Mineiro while also making his continental debut in the 2009 Copa Libertadores.

In 2011, he rejoined former loan club Náutico on a full-time contract. His second debut for the club came against Elicarlos' first club, Porto, in the 2011 Campeonato Pernambucano. He subsequently made 17 appearances in the aforementioned competition. He went on to make a total of 122 league appearances for Náutico whilst scoring 7 goals. He remained with the club between 2011 and 2016, a spell that included a loan move to Chapecoense, before departing to join Figueirense where he was assigned the number 85 shirt. His Figueirense debut came in the 2016 Primeira Liga against Flamengo.

== Honours ==
Cruzeiro

- Campeonato Mineiro (2): 2008, 2009
