= Juninho (footballer, born July 1981) =

Brazilian footballer (born 1981)

Personal information
- Full name: Tadeu de Jesus Nogueira Júnior
- Date of birth: 9 July 1981 (age 45)
- Place of birth: Ribeirão Preto, Brazil
- Height: 1.85 m (6 ft 1 in)
- Position: Goalkeeper

Team information
- Current team: Audax São Paulo

Senior career*
Years	Team	Apps	(Gls)
2000–2005	Vitória	80	(0)
2006–2007	Cruzeiro	0	(0)
2006	→ Santa Cruz (loan)	2	(0)
2007	→ América (MG) (loan)	0	(0)
2007	América (RN)	0	(0)
2007–2009	Atlético Mineiro	37	(0)
2009	Juventude	27	(0)
2010	Paraná	41	(2)
2011	Portuguesa	3	(0)
2011–2012	Grêmio Barueri	37	(0)
2012	Caxias	6	(0)
2013	Audax São Paulo	19	(0)
2014–	Red Bull Brasil	39	(0)

International career
2004	Brazil U23	0	(0)
- * Club domestic league appearances and goals as of 5 April 2015

Tadeu de Jesus Nogueira Júnior (born 9 July 1981), commonly known as Juninho, is a Brazilian footballer who plays as goalkeeper for Audax São Paulo.

== Vitória ==
Juninho started his career at Bahia club Vitória. In 2005 season he became an understudy of Felipe but both players left the club after the club relegated to Série C.

== Cruzeiro ==
In 2006, he was signed by Cruzeiro in 2-year contract. He was the third keeper, behind Fábio and Lauro. In May 2006 he was loaned to fellow Série A team Santa Cruz. In January 2007 he left for América (MG) until the end of Campeonato Mineiro (which he was the first choice from round 4 to 10), and on 1 June left for América (RN) until the end of season.

== Atlético Mineiro ==
In July 2007 he was signed by Atlético Mineiro in 1-year contract. At first he was an understudy of Édson and then played 12 league matches since September. In 2008 season, he also played 15 league matches as second choice. In 2008 Campeonato Mineiro, he played 11 matches ahead Edson, except round 2 to 5. In March 2008 he signed a new 3-year contract.

== Série B clubs ==
On 9 July 2009 he left for Juventude until the end of 2009 season, after becoming the third choice behind Aranha and Édson. Soon after, Atlético Mineiro also signed Fabián Carini.

In December 2009 he left for Paraná. He played almost all the games for the team. In January 2011 he signed an annual deal with Portuguesa. He was the understudy of Weverton.

In May 2011, Série B club ABC attempted to sign him, but eventually failed. Instead, he joined Grêmio Barueri.

== International career ==
Juninho was the second keeper behind Heurelho Gomes in 2004 CONMEBOL Men Pre-Olympic Tournament. He capped once for Brazil U-23 team on 18 November 2003, an unofficial friendly with Santos FC.

== Career statistics ==
As of 27 January 2011

Club performance			League		Cup		Continental		Total	
Season	Club	League	Apps	Goals	Apps	Goals	Apps	Goals	Apps	Goals
Brazil			League		Copa do Brasil		South America		Total	
2000	Vitória	Copa João Havelange	3	0	0	0			?	?^{1}
2001	Vitória	Série A	0	0	0	0			?	?^{1}
2002	Vitória	Série A	0	0	0	0			?	?^{1}
2003	Vitória	Série A	29	0	2	0			?	?^{1}
2004	Vitória	Série A	42	0	10	0			?	?^{1}
2005	Vitória	Série B	6	0	0	0			?	?^{1}
2006	Cruzeiro	Série A	0	0	0	0			0	0^{3}
2006	Santa Cruz	Série A	2	0					2	0
2007	América (MG)	Nil							7	0^{4}
2007	Cruzeiro	Série A	0	0					0	0
2007	América (RN)	Série A	0	0					0	0
2007	Atlético Mineiro	Série A	12	0					12	0
2008	Atlético Mineiro	Série A	15	0	6	0	0	0	32	0^{5}
2009	Atlético Mineiro	Série A	3	0	4	0			24	0^{6}
2009	Juventude	Série B	27	0					27	0
2010	Paraná	Série B	37	2					57	2^{7}
2011	Portuguesa	Série B	0	0					?	?^{8}
2011	Grêmio Barueri	Série B								
Career total			176	2	22	0	0	0	?	?^{9}

^{1}No data available for Campeonato Baiano and Campeonato do Nordeste
^{2}No data available for Campeonato Mineiro
^{3}0 games in 2006 Campeonato Mineiro
^{4}7 games in 2007 Campeonato Mineiro
^{5}11 games in 2008 Campeonato Mineiro
^{6}17 games in 2009 Campeonato Mineiro
^{7}20 games in 2010 Campeonato Paranaense
^{8} Campeonato Paulista
^{9} See note 1 to 8.

== Honours ==
regional

- Brazilian North-East League: 2003

state

- League of Bahia State: 2000, 2002, 2003, 2004, 2005
- League of Minas Gerais state: 2006
