= Said (footballer) =

Brazilian footballer

Personal information
- Full name: Said Paulo Arges
- Date of birth: 8 October 1905
- Place of birth: Congonhas, Brazil
- Date of death: 16 April 1994 (aged 88)
- Place of death: Belo Horizonte, Brazil
- Position: Forward

Senior career*
Years	Team	Apps	(Gls)
1927–1932	Atlético Mineiro		
1933	Fluminense		
1934	Atlético Mineiro		
- * Club domestic league appearances and goals as of 30 May 2024

Said Paulo Arges (5 October 1905 – 16 April 1994), simply known as Said, was a Brazilian footballer who played as a forward. He was of Syrian descent.

== Career ==
With 142 goals scored by Atlético Mineiro and winning the state championships in 1927, 1931 and 1932, Said formed an attacking trio that became known as "Trio Maldito", or even "Three Demons" alongside Mário de Castro and Jairo, forming one of Atlético Mineiro's strongest teams of all time.

In 1927, they were responsible for one of the most historic moments of the rivalry against Cruzeiro, when Atlético Mineiro defeated Palestra Itália by 9–2. The Three Demons scored 8 of the 9 goals in the match.

== Honours ==
Atlético Mineiro

- Campeonato Mineiro: 1927, 1931, 1932
