= Carlos Brant =

Brazilian footballer (1905–1994)

Personal information
- Full name: Carlos Ferreira Brant
- Date of birth: 19 November 1905
- Place of birth: Diamantina, Brazil
- Date of death: 18 March 1994 (aged 88)
- Place of death: Rio de Janeiro, Brazil
- Positions: Defender; midfielder

Youth career
- Sete de Setembro-MG

Senior career*
Years	Team	Apps	(Gls)
1926	Sete de Setembro-MG		
1927–1932	Atlético Mineiro	115	(41)
1933–1941	Fluminense	252	(19)

International career
1940	Brazil	1	(0)
- * Club domestic league appearances and goals as of 10 February 2024

Carlos Brant (19 November 1905 – 18 March 1994), was a Brazilian professional footballer who played as a defender and midfielder.

== Career ==
Revealed in Sete de Setembro, in 1927 he was signed by Atlético Mineiro in exchange for training balls, being part of the Minas Gerais champion squad alongside other great players at the time such as Said, Jairo and Mário de Castro. He was part of the Brazil national football team preparation group for the 1930 FIFA World Cup, being passed over by Rio de Janeiro players Fernando Giudicelli and Hermógenes in the final list. In 1933 he would play for Fluminense, where he also had a successful career with 252 appearances and five state championships won. In 1940 he finally represented the Brazilian team, in a friendly against Uruguay.

== Personal life ==
Carlos Brandt was the nephew of Francisco José de Almeida Brant, UFMG rector.

== Honours ==
Atlético Mineiro

- Campeonato Mineiro: 1927, 1931, 1932 (LMDT)

Fluminense

- Campeonato Carioca: 1936, 1937, 1939, 1940, 1941
- Taça da Prefeitura do Distrito Federal: 1938
- Torneio Aberto: 1935
