= Jairo (footballer, born 1904) =

Brazilian footballer

Personal information
- Full name: Jairo de Assis Almeida
- Date of birth: 27 March 1904
- Place of birth: Muriaé, Brazil
- Date of death: 10 November 1987 (aged 83)
- Place of death: Brasília, Brazil
- Position: Forward

Senior career*
Years	Team	Apps	(Gls)
1926–1933	Atlético Mineiro		
- * Club domestic league appearances and goals as of 30 May 2024

Jairo de Assis Almeida (27 March 1904 – 10 November 1987), simply known as Jairo, was a Brazilian footballer who played as a forward.

== Career ==
A medical student, Jairo entered football late. He played very refined football, and alongside Said and Mário de Castro, he formed the formed an attacking trio that became known as "Trio Maldito", or even "Three Demons", who scored 450 goals together and won the state title in 1927, 1931 and 1932.

In 1927, they were responsible for one of the most historic moments of the rivalry against Cruzeiro, when Atlético Mineiro defeated Palestra Itália by 9–2. The Three Demons scored 8 of the 9 goals in the match.

== Honours ==
Atlético Mineiro

- Campeonato Mineiro: 1926, 1927, 1931, 1932
