= 1965 Campeonato Brasileiro Série A =

Campeonato Brasileiro Série A
- Season: 1965
- Champions: Santos (5th title)
- Matches: 48
- Goals: 154 (3.21 per match)
- Top goalscorer: Alcindo (10 goals)

The 1965 Campeonato Brasileiro Série A (officially the 1965 Taça Brasil) was the 8th edition of the Campeonato Brasileiro Série A.

== Northern Zone ==
=== Northern Group ===
Teams			Scores		Tie-breaker	
Team 1	Points	Team 2	1st leg	2nd leg	3rd leg	GD
Northern Group First Stage
Nacional (Amazonas (Brazilian state))	0:4	(Pará) Remo	0:1	1:3	–	—
Sampaio Corrêa (Maranhão)	4:0	(Piauí) Flamengo	1:0	1:0	–	—
Northern Group Semifinal
Remo (Pará)	2:2	(Maranhão) Sampaio Corrêa	5:2	0:1	3:3	8:6
Northern Final
Remo (Pará)	2:2	(Pernambuco) Náutico	3:0	1:3	1:3	—

=== Northeastern Group ===
Teams			Scores		Tie-breaker	
Team 1	Points	Team 2	1st leg	2nd leg	3rd leg	GD
Northeastern Group First Stage
Campinense (Paraíba)	3:1	(Rio Grande do Norte) Alecrim	4:1	1:1	–	—
Sergipe	2:2	(Alagoas) CRB	1:4	2:0	2:2	5:6
Northeastern Group Semifinals
Campinense (Paraíba)	3:1	(Alagoas) CRB	0:0	1:0	–	—
Northeastern Group Final
Campinense (Paraíba)	0:4	(Bahia) Vitória	1:2	0:1	–	—

=== Northern Zone Decision ===
Teams			Scores		Tie-breaker	
Team 1	Points	Team 2	1st leg	2nd leg	3rd leg	GD
Náutico (Pernambuco)	4:0	(Bahia) Vitória	2:0	2:0	–	—

== Southern Zone ==
=== Southern Group ===
Teams			Scores		Tie-breaker	
Team 1	Points	Team 2	1st leg	2nd leg	3rd leg	GD
Southern Group First Round
Grêmio Maringá (Paraná (state))	0:4	(Rio Grande do Sul) Grêmio	0:4	0:2	—	—
Southern Group Final
Olímpico (Santa Catarina (state))	0:4	(Rio Grande do Sul) Grêmio	0:1	1:4	—	—

=== Central Group ===
Teams			Scores		Tie-breaker	
Team 1	Points	Team 2	1st leg	2nd leg	3rd leg	GD
Quarterfinals
Atlético (Goiás)	4:0	(Federal District (Brazil)) Guanabara	2:0	4:2	–	—
Eletrovapo (Rio de Janeiro (state))	2:2	(Espírito Santo) Desportiva Ferroviária	1:1	2:2	1:1	–
Semifinals
Desportiva Ferroviária (Espírito Santo)	2:2	(Goiás) Atlético	2:0	0:4	1:2	–
Central zone final
Atlético (Goiás)	0:4	(Minas Gerais) Siderúrgica	0:3	1:3	–	–

=== Southern Zone Decision ===
Teams			Scores		Tie-breaker	
Team 1	Points	Team 2	1st leg	2nd leg	3rd leg	GD
Grêmio (Rio Grande do Sul)	3:1	(Minas Gerais) Siderúrgica	3:1	2:2	–	—

== Preliminary Finals ==
Teams			Scores		Tie-breaker	
Team 1	Points	Team 2	1st leg	2nd leg	3rd leg	GD
Northern Zone Decision
Fortaleza (Ceará)	0:4	(Pernambuco) Náutico	2:3	2:3	—	—
Southern Zone Decision
Palmeiras (São Paulo (state))	2:2	(Rio Grande do Sul) Grêmio	4:1	1:5	2:0	—

== Semifinals ==
Vasco da Gama and Santos enter in this stage

Teams			Scores		Tie-breaker
Team 1	Points	Team 2	1st leg	2nd leg	3rd leg
Náutico (Pernambuco)	1:3	(Guanabara (state)) Vasco da Gama	2:2	0:1	—
Santos (São Paulo (state))	3:1	(São Paulo (state)) Palmeiras	4:2	1:1	—

== Finals ==
1 December 1965

Santos FC	5–1	Vasco da Gama
Coutinho 6'; Dorval 17' 19'; Toninho Guerreiro 71' 87'		Celio 83' (pen.)

Estádio do Pacaembu, São Paulo
Attendance: 16,764
Referee: Romualdo Arppi Filho

8 December 1965

Vasco da Gama	0–1 (1–6 agg.)	Santos FC
		Pelé 67'

Maracanã, Rio de Janeiro
Attendance: 38,788
Referee: Armando Marques
