= Esporte Clube Siderúrgica =

Siderúrgica
- Full name: Esporte Clube Siderúrgica
- Nicknames: Esquadrão de Aço (Steel squad); Sidera; Tartaruga (Turtle)
- Founded: May 31, 1930
- Ground: Estádio Praia do Ó, Sabará
- Capacity: 1,000
Home colors	Away colors

Esporte Clube Siderúrgica, better known as Siderúrgica, is a Brazilian football club based in Sabará, Minas Gerais. They competed in the Taça Brasil in 1965 and won the Campeonato Mineiro twice, in 1937 and 1964.

== History ==
Esporte Clube Siderúrgica was founded on May 31, 1930, by employees of the Belgo-Mineira Ironwork Company. The club was initially organized to be a sports recreation club for employees of the company, which became a sponsor of the club, helping to improve its various departments, especially its group of professional athletes.

After winning the 1932 Campeonato Mineiro Módulo II, Siderúrgica played in the Módulo I for the first time in 1933 and became a professional club.

Sidera won the Campeonato Mineiro for the first time in 1937, defeating Villa Nova in the finals.

Siderúrgica won the State championship again in 1964, and became the second club outside Belo Horizonte to win the Campeonato Mineiro more than once, alongside their rivals Villa Nova. The title is also notable for being the last before the inauguration of Minas' biggest stadium, Belo Horizonte's Mineirão. Because of this title, they competed in the Taça Brasil in 1965, in which they finished in seventh place.

The Esquadrão de Aço was crowned the first champion of the interior of Minas Gerais in 1965, a title given to the team outside the capital with the better campaign in the Campeonato Mineiro.

In 1967 the Belgo-Mineira Ironworks Company ceased its financial support to the club and so Siderúrgica ceased its own professional football department for a long time.

The club played professional tournaments again in 1993, 1997, 2007, 2011, 2012, 2016 and 2017 in the Campeonato Mineiro Módulo II, but failed to return to the first division of the State championship. The team has ever since only fielded a juniors female team.

== Honours ==
=== State ===
- Campeonato Mineiro
  - Winners (2): 1937, 1964
  - Runners-up (6): 1936, 1938, 1941, 1950, 1952, 1960
- Campeonato Mineiro Módulo II
  - Winners (1): 1932
- Campeonato Mineiro do Interior
  - Winners (1): 1965
- Torneio Início do Campeonato Mineiro
  - Winners (4): 1942, 1951, 1956, 1965

=== City ===
- Campeonato Amador de Sabará
  - Winners (2): 1969, 1986

== Stadium ==
Esporte Clube Siderúrgica plays their home games at Estádio Praia do Ó. In 2011, due to problems with their stadium, Siderúrgica played in Estádio Israel Pinheiro, in Itabira.
