= 2005 Campeonato Mineiro =

Campeonato Mineiro de Futebol do Módulo I
- Season: 2005
- Champions: Ipatinga (1st title)
- Relegated: Mamoré; Valeriodoce
- 2006 CB: Ipatinga; URT
- 2005 Série C: Villa Nova; Ipatinga; Ituiutaba
- Matches: 72
- Goals: 208 (2.89 per match)
- Top goalscorer: Fred (Cruzeiro) - 13 goals
- Biggest home win: Atlético 4-0 Democrata-SL (February 9, 2005)
- Biggest away win: Mamoré 0-4 Ipatinga (February 13, 2005); América 0-4 Cruzeiro (February 27, 2005); Valeriodoce 1-5 Cruzeiro (March 12, 2005); URT 0-4 Ipatinga (March 27, 2005)
- Highest scoring: América 3-3 Guarani (February 5, 2005); América 4-2 Valeriodoce (February 10, 2005); Valeriodoce 1-5 Cruzeiro (March 12, 2005)

The 2005 Campeonato Mineiro de Futebol do Módulo I was the 91st season of Minas Gerais's top-flight professional football league. The season began on January 23 and ended on April 17. Ipatinga won the title for the 1st time.

== Participating teams ==
Locations of the 2005 Módulo I teams

Club	Home city	Previous season
América	Belo Horizonte	3rd
Atlético	Belo Horizonte	2nd
Caldense	Poços de Caldas	4th
Cruzeiro	Belo Horizonte	1st
Democrata	Sete Lagoas	2nd (Second level)
Guarani	Divinópolis	6th
Ipatinga	Ipatinga	7th
Ituiutaba	Ituiutaba	1st (Second level)
Mamoré	Patos de Minas	10th
URT	Patos de Minas	8th
Valeriodoce	Itabira	9th
Villa Nova	Nova Lima	5th

== League table ==
Pos	Team	Pld	W	D	L	GF	GA	GD	Pts	Qualification or relegation
1	Cruzeiro	11	8	2	1	23	7	+16	26	Qualified to the Semifinals
2	Ipatinga	11	7	3	1	21	9	+12	24	Qualified to the Semifinals
3	URT	11	6	3	2	20	16	+4	21	Qualified to the Semifinals
4	Atlético	11	6	1	4	24	14	+10	19	Qualified to the Semifinals
5	Villa Nova	11	5	2	4	15	16	−1	17	
6	Ituiutaba	11	3	5	3	17	16	+1	14	
7	América	11	4	1	6	15	21	−6	13	
8	Guarani	11	3	3	5	15	18	−3	12	
9	Caldense	11	2	5	4	12	15	−3	11	
10	Democrata-SL	11	2	4	5	8	15	−7	10	
11	Valeriodoce	11	2	3	6	15	26	−11	9	Relegated
12	Mamoré	11	1	2	8	9	21	−12	5	Relegated

Updated to match(es) played on March 23, 2005. Source: RSSSF.com
Rules for classification: 1) points; 2) wins; 3) goal difference; 4) number of goals scored.

=== Final Tournament ===
Semi-finals
4th	Atlético	0	0	0
1st	Cruzeiro	1	0	1
3rd	URT	0	2	2
2nd	Ipatinga	4	2	6

Finals
1st	Cruzeiro	1	1	2
2nd	Ipatinga	1	2	3

== Finals ==
=== First leg ===
2005-04-10
16:00 (UTC-3)

Ipatinga	1 – 1	Cruzeiro
Kanu 57'	(Report) (pt)	Charles 80' (o.g.)

Ipatingão, Ipatinga
Attendance: 13,428
Referee: Álvaro Quelhas

=== Second leg ===
2005-04-17
16:00 (UTC-3)

Cruzeiro	1 – 2	Ipatinga
Fred 88'	(Report) (pt)	Léo Medeiros 5'; William 15'

Mineirão, Belo Horizonte
Attendance: 52,816
Referee: Alício Pena Júnior

Campeonato Mineiro
2005 champion

1st title
