= Yale Atlético Clube =

Yale
- Full name: Yale Atlético Clube
- Founded: 7 August 1910
- Dissolved: 1930
Home colors	Away colors

Yale Atlético Clube, usually called Yale, was one of the first sports club in Belo Horizonte, Minas Gerais, Brazil.

== History ==
Founded on 7 August 1910, by Italian immigrants, the club supplied the city with many different sport teams, one of them was football. They played in the Campeonato de Belo Horizonte (Belo Horizonte Championship) – which is now the Campeonato Mineiro – until 1925, that's the year it gave up football.

Yale eventually split and part of it became the Palestra Itália of Minas, a team which was created to compete with many of the bigger teams in Belo Horizonte like America, Atlético, and Yale itself. Yale's separation into the Palestra caused many of Yale's footballers to join the Palestra a team which later became Cruzeiro. In conclusion it can be said that the team that was once Yale became the Cruzeiro of today.

== Honours ==
- Campeonato Mineiro
  - Runners-up (1): 1915
