= Jajá (footballer, born 1986) =

Brazilian footballer

Personal information
- Full name: Francisco Jaílson de Sousa
- Date of birth: November 29, 1986 (age 39)
- Place of birth: Itapipoca, Brazil
- Height: 1.70 m (5 ft 7 in)
- Position: Attacking midfielder

Youth career
- 2000–2003: Brasiliense
- 2003–2005: Bahia

Senior career*
Years	Team	Apps	(Gls)
2005	Bahia	18	(7)
2006–2012	Cruzeiro	17	(0)
2006	→ Betim (loan)		
2007	→ Guarani-MG (loan)		
2007	→ Náutico (loan)	27	(13)
2008	→ Guarani-MG (loan)	34	(16)
2009	→ Vitória (loan)		
2009	→ Montedio Yamagata (loan)	2	(1)
2010	→ Betim (loan)	17	(3)
2011	→ Cabofriense (loan)	7	(0)
2011	→ Vila Nova (loan)	6	(0)
2012	→ Boa Esporte (loan)	20	(6)
2013	Guarani-MG	5	(0)
2014	Caxias	4	(0)
2014	Horizonte	11	(1)
2014–2015	Atlético CP	12	(2)
2015	Jiangxi Liansheng	16	(2)
2017	Tupi	0	(0)
2017	URT	2	(0)
2017–2018	Tapajós		
- * Club domestic league appearances and goals

Francisco Jaílson de Sousa (born November 29, 1986), or simply Jajá, is a Brazilian former professional footballer who played as an attacking midfielder.

== Career history ==
Jaja was born in Itapipoca. On 2005, he started his senior football career in Bahia. On 2006, he joined Cruzeiro on a six-year contract. Between 2006 and 2012, he played on loan in many Brazilian football clubs in Série B and Série C of Brazilian football league. On 2009, he also played for a short time in Montedio Yamagata in J1 League in Japan. In January 2013, he joined Guarani-MG, a football club competing in Série D.

In July 2014, he joined Atlético CP in Portugal.

== Honours ==
Cruzeiro

- Campeonato Mineiro: 2008

Vitória

- Campeonato Baiano: 2009

Boa Esporte

- Taça Minas Gerais: 2012
