= Estádio Juscelino Kubitschek de Oliveira =

Stadium in Belo Horizonte, Brazil

Coordinates: 19.922339773685493°S 43.949874051867674°W

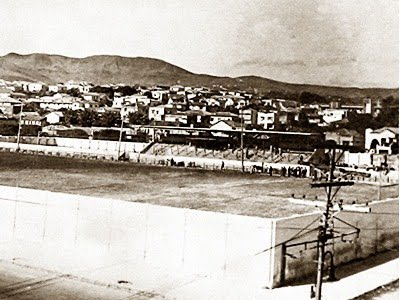
- Interactive map of Estádio Juscelino Kubitschek de Oliveira
- Full name: Estádio Juscelino Kubitschek de Oliveira
- Location: Belo Horizonte, Brazil
- Owner: Cruzeiro Esporte Clube
- Operator: Cruzeiro Esporte Clube
- Capacity: 15,000

Construction
- Opened: September 23, 1923
- Closed: 1986

Tenant
- Cruzeiro Esporte Clube

Estádio Juscelino Kubitschek de Oliveira was a multi-use stadium in Belo Horizonte, Brazil. It was initially used as the stadium of Cruzeiro Esporte Clube matches. It was replaced by Estádio Independência in 1950. The capacity of the stadium was 15,000 spectators.
