= Mário de Castro =

Brazilian footballer

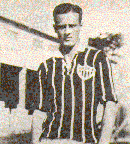

Personal information
- Date of birth: 30 June 1905
- Place of birth: Formiga, Brazil
- Date of death: 29 April 1998 (aged 92)
- Place of death: Formiga, Brazil
- Position: Striker

Senior career*
Years	Team	Apps	(Gls)
1926–1931	Atlético Mineiro	100	(195)
Total		100	(195)
- * Club domestic league appearances and goals

Mário de Castro (30 June 1905 – 29 April 1998) was a Brazilian footballer who played as forward. He spent his entire career at Atlético Mineiro, with whom he won three Campeonato Mineiro titles, a competition of which he was top goalscorer twice. Mário de Castro was the first Atlético Mineiro player to be called up for the Brazil national football team, and scored 195 goals in 100 matches for the club.

== Career ==
Born in Formiga, a city in Minas Gerais state, in 1925 Mário de Castro moved to Belo Horizonte to study medicine at Universidade Federal de Minas Gerais. Shortly after his arrival, Mário took part in a training session on América Mineiro's ground, and was accepted to join the club. A few days later, however, he showed up at a training session in Atlético Mineiro's stadium, which was just across the street from América's. Coach Chico Neto selected him for the first team immediately, and he eventually played for the club his entire career.

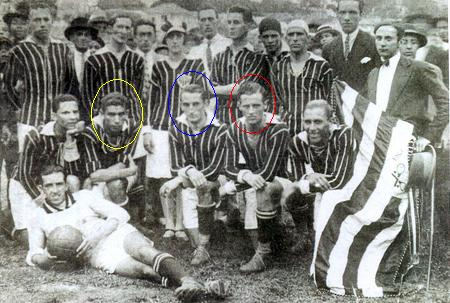
The Trio Maldito (circled): Said, Jairo and Mário de Castro, from left to right

Mário de Castro helped Atlético Mineiro break América's decade-long dominance in Campeonato Mineiro, the state league of Minas Gerais. In 1926 he was the competition's top scorer as Atlético were crowned champions for the second time with 20 goals, a feat he repeated in the following season with 27 goals. Mário de Castro was part of an offensive trident called the Trio Maldito (Portuguese for Unholy Trio), also composed of Said and Jairo. Together, they scored more than 450 goals for Atlético Mineiro.

Mário was the first Atlético Mineiro player and first outside of Rio de Janeiro or São Paulo to be called up for the Brazil national football team. In 1929, the inauguration of Atlético's Antônio Carlos stadium had the presence of Horácio Werner, a CBD official, and Alysio Távora, a journalist from Rio de Janeiro. Both watched as Atlético defeated Corinthians 4–2 with two goals by Mário de Castro, and a few days later he was called up to the Seleção. However, he was to serve as backup for Botafogo's Carvalho Leite, so the call-up was refused, as Mário de Castro wanted to play in the first squad.

He would also win the 1931 Campeonato Mineiro with Atlético, as the team, after trailing 0–3 in the first half of the final game against Villa Nova made a 4–3 comeback thanks to four goals by Mário de Castro in the second half. Celebrations over the victory became tragical, however, as a Villa Nova fan was shot and killed by an Atlético director, a fact which outraged Mário de Castro and prompted him to end his career at 26 years old. He scored a total of 195 goals in 100 matches played with the club, averaging a record 1.95 goal per game. After his football retirement he became a doctor in his hometown, but eventually played a farewell match in 1941 against Madureira in which he scored his last goal. He is featured on Atlético Mineiro's "Great Idols" list on the club's official website.

== Honours ==
=== Club ===
Atlético Mineiro

- Campeonato Mineiro: 1926, 1927, 1931

=== Individual ===
- Campeonato Mineiro top goalscorer: 1926, 1927

== See also ==
- List of one-club men
