= 2002 Campeonato Mineiro =

Campeonato Mineiro de Futebol do Módulo I
- Season: 2002
- Champions: Caldense (1st title); Cruzeiro (1st title superchampionship)
- Relegated: Uberlândia
- 2003 CB: Caldense; Ipatinga; Cruzeiro; Atlético
- 2002 Série C: Villa Nova; Ipatinga; Tupi; Uberlândia
- Matches: 66
- Goals: 185 (2.8 per match)
- Top goalscorer: Gustavinho (Caldense) - 10 goals
- Biggest home win: Villa Nova 5-0 Tupi (April 28, 2002)
- Biggest away win: Nacional 1-6 Caldense (March 24, 2002)
- Highest scoring: Nacional 1-6 Caldense (March 24, 2002)

The 2002 Campeonato Mineiro de Futebol do Módulo I was the 88th season of Minas Gerais's top-flight professional football league. The season began on February 3 and ended on May 30. Caldense won the title for the regular season, that being its first title, and Cruzeiro won the superchampionship, winning the title for the 1st time.

== Participating teams ==
Locations of the 2002 Módulo I teams

Club	Home city	Previous season
América	Belo Horizonte	1st
Atlético	Belo Horizonte	2nd
Caldense	Poços de Caldas	7th
Cruzeiro	Belo Horizonte	3rd
Ipatinga	Ipatinga	6th
Mamoré	Patos de Minas	4th
Nacional	Uberaba	2nd (Second level)
Rio Branco	Andradas	8th
Tupi	Juíz de Fora	1st (Second level)
Uberlândia	Uberlândia	10th
URT	Patos de Minas	9th
Villa Nova	Nova Lima	5th

== System ==
The championship would have two stages.:

- First phase: Out of the twelve teams, the four that had qualified to the Copa Sul-Minas in the previous year received a bye to the Superchampionship and the remaining eight teams played a double round-robin tournament, in which the team with the most points would win the state title and qualify to the Superchampionship.
- Superchampionship: The champions of the first phase would join the four teams that had received a bye to the Superchampionship, and played a single round-robin tournament, in which the team with the most points would win the title.

== League table ==
=== First phase ===
Pos	Team	Pld	W	D	L	GF	GA	GD	Pts	Qualification or relegation
1	Caldense	14	7	5	2	31	17	+14	26	Champions;Qualified to Superchampionship
2	Ipatinga	14	7	4	3	21	13	+8	25	Qualified to 2002 Série C
3	Villa Nova	14	7	2	5	26	21	+5	23	Qualified to 2002 Série C
4	Tupi	14	5	6	3	22	21	+1	21	Qualified to 2002 Série C
5	Rio Branco	14	4	5	5	19	16	+3	17	
6	URT	14	3	6	5	10	17	−7	15	
7	Nacional	14	2	6	6	15	26	−11	12	
8	Uberlândia	14	3	2	9	11	24	−13	11	Relegated

Updated to match(es) played on May 5, 2002. Source: RSSSF.com
Rules for classification: 1) points; 2) wins; 3) goal difference; 4) number of goals scored.

=== Superchampionship ===
Pos	Team	Pld	W	D	L	GF	GA	GD	Pts	Qualification or relegation
1	Cruzeiro	4	3	0	1	7	2	+5	9	Champions
2	Caldense	4	3	0	1	8	6	+2	9	
3	América	4	2	1	1	7	4	+3	7	
4	Atlético	4	1	1	2	6	7	−1	4	
5	Mamoré	4	0	0	4	2	11	−9	0	

Updated to match(es) played on May 30, 2002. Source: RSSSF.com
Rules for classification: 1) points; 2) wins; 3) goal difference; 4) number of goals scored.

Campeonato Mineiro
2002 champion

1st title

Supercampeonato Mineiro
2002 champion

1st title
