= 2008 Campeonato Mineiro =

Campeonato Mineiro de Futebol do Módulo I
- Season: 2008
- Champions: Cruzeiro (33rd title)
- Relegated: Ipatinga; Democrata de Sete Lagoas
- 2009 CB: Atlético Mineiro; Tupi; América
- 2008 Série C: Tupi; Ituiutaba; América
- Matches: 72
- Goals: 208 (2.89 per match)
- Top goalscorer: Jajá (Guarani) - 7 goals
- Biggest home win: Cruzeiro 4-0 Uberaba (January 27, 2008); Villa Nova 4-0 Ituiutaba (January 27, 2008); Ipatinga 4-0 Uberaba (February 28, 2008)
- Biggest away win: Rio Branco 0-6 Atlético (March 29, 2008)
- Highest scoring: Ituiutaba 4-4 Cruzeiro (April 12, 2008)

The 2008 Campeonato Mineiro de Futebol do Módulo I was the 94th season of Minas Gerais's top-flight professional football league. The season began on January 27 and ended on May 4. Cruzeiro won the title for the 33rd time.

== Participating teams ==
Locations of the 2008 Módulo I teams

Club	Home city	Previous season
Atlético	Belo Horizonte	1st
Cruzeiro	Belo Horizonte	2nd
Democrata	Governador Valadares	3rd
Democrata	Sete Lagoas	8th
Guarani	Divinópolis	10th
Ipatinga	Ipatinga	7th
Ituiutaba	Ituiutaba	9th
Rio Branco	Andradas	6th
Social	Coronel Fabriciano	1st (Second level)
Tupi	Juíz de Fora	4th
Uberaba	Uberaba	2nd (Second level)
Villa Nova	Nova Lima	5th

== League table ==
Pos	Team	Pld	W	D	L	GF	GA	GD	Pts	Qualification or relegation
1	Cruzeiro	11	8	2	1	22	9	+13	26	Qualified to the Semifinals
2	Tupi	11	6	3	2	16	12	+4	21	Qualified to the Semifinals
3	Atlético	11	6	1	4	18	7	+11	19	Qualified to the Semifinals
4	Ituiutaba	11	5	4	2	14	12	+2	19	Qualified to the Semifinals
5	Guarani	11	5	3	3	20	16	+4	18	
6	Villa Nova	11	5	2	4	21	15	+6	17	
7	Rio Branco	11	4	4	3	14	14	0	16	
8	Democrata-GV	11	4	0	7	10	16	−6	12	
9	Uberaba	11	3	3	5	13	22	−9	12	
10	Social	11	3	2	6	12	18	−6	11	
11	Ipatinga	11	3	0	8	12	17	−5	9	Relegated
12	Democrata-SL	11	2	0	9	12	26	−14	6	Relegated

Updated to match(es) played on May 4, 2008. Source: RSSSF.com
Rules for classification: 1) points; 2) wins; 3) goal difference; 4) number of goals scored.

=== Final Tournament ===
Semi-finals
4th	Ituiutaba	4	1	5
1st	Cruzeiro	4	3	7
3rd	Atlético	3	1	4
2nd	Tupi	2	0	2

Finals
1st	Cruzeiro	5	1	6
3rd	Atlético	0	0	0

== Finals ==
=== First leg ===
2008-04-27
16:00 (UTC-3)

Atlético	0 – 5	Cruzeiro
	(Report) (pt)	Marcelo Moreno 12'; Marcos 19' (o.g.); Ramires 38'; Guilherme 66'; Wagner 77'

Mineirão, Belo Horizonte
Attendance: 48,093
Referee: Paulo César de Oliveira

=== Second leg ===
2008-05-04
16:00 (UTC-3)

Cruzeiro	1 – 0	Atlético
Marcelo Moreno 75'	(Report) (pt)

Mineirão, Belo Horizonte
Attendance: 39,197
Referee: Evandro Rogério Roman

Campeonato Mineiro
2008 champion

33th title
