= 2009 Campeonato Mineiro =

Campeonato Mineiro de Futebol do Módulo I
- Season: 2009
- Champions: Cruzeiro (34th title)
- Relegated: Social; Guarani
- Goals scored: 220
- Top goalscorer: Diego Tardelli (16 goals)

The Campeonato Mineiro de Futebol do Módulo I de 2009 was the 95th season of Minas Gerais's top-flight professional football league. The season began on January 25 and ended on May 3. Cruzeiro were crowned the league champion after going through the competition undefeated.

== Participating teams ==
Locations of the 2009 Módulo I teams

Club	Home city	Previous season
América	Belo Horizonte	1st (Second level)
Atlético Mineiro	Belo Horizonte	2nd
Cruzeiro	Belo Horizonte	1st
Democrata	Governador Valadares	8th
Guarani	Divinópolis	5th
Ituiutaba	Ituiutaba	4th
Rio Branco	Andradas	7th
Social	Coronel Fabriciano	10th
Tupi	Juíz de Fora	3rd
Uberaba	Uberaba	9th
Uberlândia	Uberlândia	2nd (Second level)
Villa Nova	Nova Lima	6th

== League table ==
Pos	Team	Pld	W	D	L	GF	GA	GD	Pts	Qualification or relegation
1	Atlético	11	8	2	1	24	8	+16	26	Qualified to the quarterfinals
2	Cruzeiro	11	7	4	0	31	8	+23	25	Qualified to the quarterfinals
3	Ituiutaba	11	6	2	3	20	16	+4	20	Qualified to the quarterfinals
4	Rio Branco	11	5	2	4	14	12	+2	17	Qualified to the quarterfinals
5	América	11	4	5	2	9	8	+1	17	Qualified to the quarterfinals
6	Democrata	11	5	1	5	17	20	−3	16	Qualified to the quarterfinals
7	Tupi	11	3	6	2	9	10	−1	15	Qualified to the quarterfinals
8	Uberaba	11	4	2	5	12	16	−4	14	Qualified to the quarterfinals
9	Uberlândia	11	3	3	5	15	18	−3	12	
10	Villa Nova	11	1	4	6	15	23	−8	7	
11	Social	11	1	4	6	6	18	−12	7	Relegated to Módulo II 2010
12	Guarani	11	0	3	8	6	21	−15	3	Relegated to Módulo II 2010

=== Final Tournament ===
Quarter-finals
1st	Atlético	1	6	7
8th	Uberaba	0	0	0
4th	Rio Branco	0	3	3
5th	América	0	0	0
3rd	Ituiutaba	1	2	3
6th	Democrata	0	1	1
2nd	Cruzeiro	1	7	8
7th	Tupi	0	2	2

Semi-finals
1st	Atlético	2	1	3
4th	Rio Branco	0	0	0
3rd	Ituiutaba	1	1	2
2nd	Cruzeiro	4	2	6

Finals
1st	Atlético	0	1	1
2nd	Cruzeiro	5	1	6

== Finals ==
=== First leg ===
2009-04-26
16:00 (UTC-3)

Cruzeiro	5 – 0	Atlético
Kléber 39'; Leonardo Silva 55', 61'; Jonathan 78', 86'	(Report) (pt)

Mineirão - Belo Horizonte
Attendance: 47,489
Referee: Paulo César de Oliveira

=== Second leg ===
2009-05-03
16:00 (UTC-3)

Atlético	1 – 1	Cruzeiro
Fabiano 16'	(Report) (pt)	Kléber 21' (pen.)

Mineirão - Belo Horizonte
Attendance: 38,186
Referee: Leonardo Gaciba

Campeonato Mineiro
2009 champion

Cruzeiro
34th title
