= Campeonato Mineiro =

State football league of Minas Gerais, Brazil

- Organising body: FMF
- Founded: 1915; 111 years ago (as an amateur Campeonato de Belo Horizonte); 1933; 93 years ago (as a professional Campeonato de Belo Horizonte); 1958; 68 years ago (as Campeonato Mineiro)
- Country: Brazil
- State: Minas Gerais
- Level on pyramid: 1
- Relegation to: Campeonato Mineiro Módulo II
- Domestic cup: Copa do Brasil
- Current champions: Cruzeiro (39th title) (2026)
- Most championships: Atlético (50 titles)
- Broadcaster(s): Rede Globo; SporTV; Premiere FC
- Website: FMF Official website
- Current: 2026 Campeonato Mineiro

The Campeonato Mineiro is the top-flight professional state football league in the Brazilian state of Minas Gerais. It is run by the Minas Gerais Football Federation (FMF).

The history of Campeonato Mineiro can be divided into two parts: before and after the construction of the Mineirão, in September 1966. The Mineirão is the biggest football stadium of Minas Gerais and it is located in Minas Gerais' state capital, Belo Horizonte. Before the stadium's inauguration América and Atlético were the most successful teams in the state, but after the construction of the Mineirão, known as the "Era Mineirão" ("Mineirão Era"), another team from the capital, Cruzeiro, also gained prominence. Atlético is the most successful team in the competition, having won 50 championships as of 2026, trailed by Cruzeiro with 39 championships.

As with many other Brazilian football state leagues, the Campeonato Mineiro is much older than the Brazilian League itself. This is partly because in the early 20th century Brazil did not have a well established transportation and communication infrastructure, that could help it organize a national league in the country, which was made worse by the nation's enormous size.

Many of the best players in Brazilian football were first seen in the Campeonato Mineiro. Reinaldo, Cerezo, Éder, Ronaldo, Dario and Tostão had their professional football debut in the competition.

== Current clubs ==
2025 Módulo I

- América (Belo Horizonte)
- Athletic (São João del-Rei)
- Atlético (Belo Horizonte)
- Aymorés (Ubá)
- Betim (Betim)
- Cruzeiro (Belo Horizonte)
- Democrata (Governador Valadares)
- Itabirito (Itabirito)
- Pouso Alegre (Pouso Alegre)
- Tombense (Tombos)
- Uberlândia (Uberlândia)
- Villa Nova (Nova Lima)

== List of champions ==
=== Amateur era (Campeonato da Cidade de Belo Horizonte) ===
Season	Winner	Runner-up
1915	Atlético Mineiro (Belo Horizonte)	Yale (Belo Horizonte)
1916	América (Belo Horizonte)	Atlético Mineiro (Belo Horizonte)
1917	América (Belo Horizonte)	Atlético Mineiro (Belo Horizonte)
1918	América (Belo Horizonte)	Atlético Mineiro (Belo Horizonte)
1919	América (Belo Horizonte)	Sete de Setembro (Belo Horizonte)
1920	América (Belo Horizonte)	Sete de Setembro (Belo Horizonte)
1921	América (Belo Horizonte)	Atlético Mineiro (Belo Horizonte)
1922	América (Belo Horizonte)	Palestra Itália (Belo Horizonte)
1923	América (Belo Horizonte)	Palestra Itália (Belo Horizonte)
1924	América (Belo Horizonte)	Palestra Itália (Belo Horizonte)
1925	América (Belo Horizonte)	Undeclared by FMF on 2012
1926	Atlético Mineiro (Belo Horizonte) (by LMDT – Liga Mineira de Desportos Terrestres); Palestra Itália (Belo Horizonte) (by AMET – Associação Mineira de Esportes Terrestres)	Palmeiras-BH (Belo Horizonte) (by LMDT – Liga Mineira de Desportos Terrestres); Olympic-BH (Belo Horizonte) (by AMET – Associação Mineira de Esportes Terrestres)
1927	Atlético Mineiro (Belo Horizonte)	América (Belo Horizonte)
1928	Palestra Itália (Belo Horizonte)	Atlético Mineiro (Belo Horizonte)
1929	Palestra Itália (Belo Horizonte)	Atlético Mineiro (Belo Horizonte)
1930	Palestra Itália (Belo Horizonte)	América (Belo Horizonte)
1931	Atlético Mineiro (Belo Horizonte)	Palestra Itália (Belo Horizonte)
1932	Atlético Mineiro (Belo Horizonte) (by LMDT – Liga Mineira de Desportos Terrestres)	Retiro (Nova Lima)
1932	Villa Nova (Nova Lima) (by AMEG – Associação Mineira de Esportes Geraes)	Palestra Itália (Belo Horizonte)

=== Professional era (Campeonato da Cidade de Belo Horizonte) ===
Season	Winner	Runner-up
1933	Villa Nova (Nova Lima)	Tupi (Juiz de Fora) (State Championship) (Palestra Itália (Belo Horizonte) (BH Championship)
1934	Villa Nova (Nova Lima)	Atlético Mineiro (Belo Horizonte)
1935	Villa Nova (Nova Lima)	Atlético Mineiro (Belo Horizonte)
1936	Atlético Mineiro (Belo Horizonte)	Siderúrgica (Sabará)
1937	Siderúrgica (Sabará)	Villa Nova (Nova Lima)
1938	Atlético Mineiro (Belo Horizonte)	Siderúrgica (Sabará)
1939	Atlético Mineiro (Belo Horizonte)	América (Belo Horizonte)
1940	Palestra Itália (Belo Horizonte)	Atlético Mineiro (Belo Horizonte)
1941	Atlético Mineiro (Belo Horizonte)	Siderúrgica (Sabará)
1942	Atlético Mineiro (Belo Horizonte)	América (Belo Horizonte)
1943	Cruzeiro (Belo Horizonte)	Atlético Mineiro (Belo Horizonte)
1944	Cruzeiro (Belo Horizonte)	Atlético Mineiro (Belo Horizonte)
1945	Cruzeiro (Belo Horizonte)	Villa Nova (Nova Lima)
1946	Atlético Mineiro (Belo Horizonte)	Villa Nova (Nova Lima)
1947	Atlético Mineiro (Belo Horizonte)	Villa Nova (Nova Lima)
1948	América (Belo Horizonte)	Atlético Mineiro (Belo Horizonte)
1949	Atlético Mineiro (Belo Horizonte)	América (Belo Horizonte)
1950	Atlético Mineiro (Belo Horizonte)	Cruzeiro (Belo Horizonte)
1951	Villa Nova (Nova Lima)	Atlético Mineiro (Belo Horizonte)
1952	Atlético Mineiro (Belo Horizonte)	Siderúrgica (Sabará)
1953	Atlético Mineiro (Belo Horizonte)	Villa Nova (Nova Lima)
1954	Atlético Mineiro (Belo Horizonte)	Cruzeiro (Belo Horizonte)
1955	Atlético Mineiro (Belo Horizonte)	Democrata-SL (Sete Lagoas)
1956	Atlético Mineiro (Belo Horizonte); Cruzeiro (Belo Horizonte)	
1957	América (Belo Horizonte)	Democrata-SL (Sete Lagoas)

=== Professional era (Campeonato Mineiro) ===
Season	Winner	Runner-up
1958	Atlético Mineiro (Belo Horizonte)	América (Belo Horizonte)
1959	Cruzeiro (Belo Horizonte)	América (Belo Horizonte)
1960	Cruzeiro (Belo Horizonte)	Siderúrgica (Sabará)
1961	Cruzeiro (Belo Horizonte)	América (Belo Horizonte)
1962	Atlético Mineiro (Belo Horizonte)	Cruzeiro (Belo Horizonte)
1963	Atlético Mineiro (Belo Horizonte)	Democrata-SL (Sete Lagoas)
1964	Siderúrgica (Sabará)	América (Belo Horizonte)
1965	Cruzeiro (Belo Horizonte)	América (Belo Horizonte)
1966	Cruzeiro (Belo Horizonte)	Atlético Mineiro (Belo Horizonte)
1967	Cruzeiro (Belo Horizonte)	Atlético Mineiro (Belo Horizonte)
1968	Cruzeiro (Belo Horizonte)	Atlético Mineiro (Belo Horizonte)
1969	Cruzeiro (Belo Horizonte)	Atlético Mineiro (Belo Horizonte)
1970	Atlético Mineiro (Belo Horizonte)	Cruzeiro (Belo Horizonte)
1971	América (Belo Horizonte)	Cruzeiro (Belo Horizonte)
1972	Cruzeiro (Belo Horizonte)	Atlético Mineiro (Belo Horizonte)
1973	Cruzeiro (Belo Horizonte)	América (Belo Horizonte)
1974	Cruzeiro (Belo Horizonte)	Atlético Mineiro (Belo Horizonte)
1975	Cruzeiro (Belo Horizonte)	Atlético Mineiro (Belo Horizonte)
1976	Atlético Mineiro (Belo Horizonte)	Cruzeiro (Belo Horizonte)
1977	Cruzeiro (Belo Horizonte)	Atlético Mineiro (Belo Horizonte)
1978	Atlético Mineiro (Belo Horizonte)	Cruzeiro (Belo Horizonte)
1979	Atlético Mineiro (Belo Horizonte)	Cruzeiro (Belo Horizonte)
1980	Atlético Mineiro (Belo Horizonte)	Cruzeiro (Belo Horizonte)
1981	Atlético Mineiro (Belo Horizonte)	Cruzeiro (Belo Horizonte)
1982	Atlético Mineiro (Belo Horizonte)	Cruzeiro (Belo Horizonte)
1983	Atlético Mineiro (Belo Horizonte)	Cruzeiro (Belo Horizonte)
1984	Cruzeiro (Belo Horizonte)	Atlético Mineiro (Belo Horizonte)
1985	Atlético Mineiro (Belo Horizonte)	Cruzeiro (Belo Horizonte)
1986	Atlético Mineiro (Belo Horizonte)	Cruzeiro (Belo Horizonte)
1987	Cruzeiro (Belo Horizonte)	Atlético Mineiro (Belo Horizonte)
1988	Atlético Mineiro (Belo Horizonte)	Cruzeiro (Belo Horizonte)
1989	Atlético Mineiro (Belo Horizonte)	Cruzeiro (Belo Horizonte)
1990	Cruzeiro (Belo Horizonte)	Atlético Mineiro (Belo Horizonte)
1991	Atlético Mineiro (Belo Horizonte)	Democrata-GV (Governador Valadares)
1992	Cruzeiro (Belo Horizonte)	América (Belo Horizonte)
1993	América (Belo Horizonte)	Atlético Mineiro (Belo Horizonte)
1994	Cruzeiro (Belo Horizonte)	Atlético Mineiro (Belo Horizonte)
1995	Atlético Mineiro (Belo Horizonte)	América (Belo Horizonte)
1996	Cruzeiro (Belo Horizonte)	Atlético Mineiro (Belo Horizonte)
1997	Cruzeiro (Belo Horizonte)	Villa Nova (Nova Lima)
1998	Cruzeiro (Belo Horizonte)	Atlético Mineiro (Belo Horizonte)
1999	Atlético Mineiro (Belo Horizonte)	América (Belo Horizonte)
2000	Atlético Mineiro (Belo Horizonte)	Cruzeiro (Belo Horizonte)
2001	América (Belo Horizonte)	Atlético Mineiro (Belo Horizonte)
2002	Caldense (Poços de Caldas)^{a}	Ipatinga (Ipatinga)
2003	Cruzeiro (Belo Horizonte)	Atlético Mineiro (Belo Horizonte)
2004	Cruzeiro (Belo Horizonte)	Atlético Mineiro (Belo Horizonte)
2005	Ipatinga (Ipatinga)	Cruzeiro (Belo Horizonte)
2006	Cruzeiro (Belo Horizonte)	Ipatinga (Ipatinga)
2007	Atlético Mineiro (Belo Horizonte)	Cruzeiro (Belo Horizonte)
2008	Cruzeiro (Belo Horizonte)	Atlético Mineiro (Belo Horizonte)
2009	Cruzeiro (Belo Horizonte)	Atlético Mineiro (Belo Horizonte)
2010	Atlético Mineiro (Belo Horizonte)	Ipatinga (Ipatinga)
2011	Cruzeiro (Belo Horizonte)	Atlético Mineiro (Belo Horizonte)
2012	Atlético Mineiro (Belo Horizonte)	América (Belo Horizonte)
2013	Atlético Mineiro (Belo Horizonte)	Cruzeiro (Belo Horizonte)
2014	Cruzeiro (Belo Horizonte)	Atlético Mineiro (Belo Horizonte)
2015	Atlético Mineiro (Belo Horizonte)	Caldense (Poços de Caldas)
2016	América (Belo Horizonte)	Atlético Mineiro (Belo Horizonte)
2017	Atlético Mineiro (Belo Horizonte)	Cruzeiro (Belo Horizonte)
2018	Cruzeiro (Belo Horizonte)	Atlético Mineiro (Belo Horizonte)
2019	Cruzeiro (Belo Horizonte)	Atlético Mineiro (Belo Horizonte)
2020	Atlético Mineiro (Belo Horizonte)	Tombense (Tombos)
2021	Atlético Mineiro (Belo Horizonte)	América (Belo Horizonte)
2022	Atlético Mineiro (Belo Horizonte)	Cruzeiro (Belo Horizonte)
2023	Atlético Mineiro (Belo Horizonte)	América (Belo Horizonte)
2024	Atlético Mineiro (Belo Horizonte)	Cruzeiro (Belo Horizonte)
2025	Atlético Mineiro (Belo Horizonte)	América (Belo Horizonte)
2026	Cruzeiro (Belo Horizonte)	Atlético Mineiro (Belo Horizonte)

^{a}: In 2002, the three main clubs in Minas Gerais (América, Atlético and Cruzeiro) plus Mamoré did not take part in the Campeonato Mineiro, because they were competing in the Copa Sul-Minas. Because of this, the Minas Gerais football body created a short tournament called the 'Supercampeonato Mineiro' bringing these four teams together with Caldense, winners of the 2002 Mineiro championship.

== Titles by team ==
Teams in bold still active.

Rank	Club	Winners	Winning years	Runners-up	Runners-up years
1	**Atlético Mineiro**	50	1915, 1926, 1927, 1931, 1932 (LMDT), 1936, 1938, 1939, 1941, 1942, 1946, 1947, 1949, 1950, 1952, 1953, 1954, 1955, 1956 (shared), 1958, 1962, 1963, 1970, 1976, 1978, 1979, 1980, 1981, 1982, 1983, 1985, 1986, 1988, 1989, 1991, 1995, 1999, 2000, 2007, 2010, 2012, 2013, 2015, 2017, 2020, 2021, 2022, 2023, 2024, 2025	39	1916, 1917, 1918, 1921, 1923, 1928, 1929, 1934, 1935, 1940, 1943, 1944, 1948, 1951, 1966, 1967, 1968, 1969, 1972, 1974, 1975, 1977, 1984, 1990, 1993, 1994, 1996, 1998, 2001, 2003, 2004, 2008, 2009, 2011, 2014, 2016, 2018, 2019, 2026
2	**Cruzeiro**	39	1928, 1929, 1930, 1940, 1943, 1944, 1945, 1956 (shared), 1959, 1960, 1961, 1965, 1966, 1967, 1968, 1969, 1972, 1973, 1974, 1975, 1977, 1984, 1987, 1990, 1992, 1994, 1996, 1997, 1998, 2003, 2004, 2006, 2008, 2009, 2011, 2014, 2018, 2019, 2026	27	1922, 1924, 1931, 1932 (AMEG), 1933, 1954, 1962, 1970, 1971, 1976, 1978, 1979, 1980, 1981, 1982, 1983, 1985, 1986, 1988, 1989, 2000, 2005, 2007, 2013, 2017, 2022, 2024
3	**América**	16	1916, 1917, 1918, 1919, 1920, 1921, 1922, 1923, 1924, 1925, 1948, 1957, 1971, 1993, 2001, 2016	18	1927, 1930, 1939, 1942, 1949, 1958, 1959, 1961, 1964, 1965, 1973, 1992, 1995, 1999, 2012, 2021, 2023, 2025
4	**Villa Nova**	5	1932 (AMEG), 1933, 1934, 1935, 1951	6	1937, 1945, 1946, 1947, 1953, 1997
5	Siderúrgica	2	1937, 1964	6	1936, 1938, 1941, 1950, 1952, 1960
6	**Ipatinga**	1	2005	3	2002, 2006, 2010
7	**Caldense**	1	2002	1	2015
8	**Democrata (SL)**	0	—	3	1955, 1957, 1963
9	Sete de Setembro	0	—	2	1919, 1920
10	**Democrata (GV)**	0	—	1	1991
10	Palmeiras	0	—	1	1926
10	Retiro	0	—	1	1932 (LMDT)
10	**Tombense**	0	—	1	2020
10	**Tupi**	0	—	1	1933
10	Yale	0	—	1	1915

RSSSF

Note: Although Cruzeiro considers itself champions of the Campeonato Mineiro in 1926, officially the Atlético Mineiro is the only official champion of this competition. Making officially Cruzeiro have 39 Campeonatos Mineiros.

=== By city ===
City	Championships	Clubs
Belo Horizonte	105	Atlético Mineiro (50), Cruzeiro (39), América (16)
Nova Lima	5	Villa Nova (5)
Sabará	2	Siderúrgica (2)
Ipatinga	1	Ipatinga (1)
Poços de Caldas	1	Caldense (1)

== Participation ==
=== Most appearances ===
As of 2025 season

Below is the list of clubs that have more appearances in the Campeonato Mineiro.

Club	App	First	Last
América	110	1915	2025
Atlético Mineiro	110	1915	2025
Cruzeiro	104	1921	2025
Villa Nova	98	1918	2025
Caldense	52	1970	2023
Uberlândia	49	1963	2025
Sete de Setembro	48	1916	1976
Uberaba	43	1945	2012
Valerio	43	1959	2005
Democrata (GV)	40	1969	2025
Democrata (SL)	38	1953	2023
Guarani	38	1958	2019
Tupi	36	1933	2019
Siderúrgica	34	1933	1966

- Do not includes 1926 AMET championship.
- Includes 2002 Supercampeonato Mineiro.
- Tupi includes the participation of "Corporativa Manchester" (1995), when club merged with Sport Juiz de Fora and Tupynambás.

== See also ==
- Campeonato Mineiro Modulo II
- Campeonato Mineiro Segunda Divisão
