= Gabriel Delfim =

Brazilian footballer

Personal information
- Full name: Gabriel Delfim Ferreira
- Date of birth: 10 July 2002 (age 24)
- Place of birth: Simonésia, Brazil
- Height: 1.92 m (6 ft 4 in)
- Position: Goalkeeper

Team information
- Current team: Atlético Mineiro
- Number: 1

Youth career
- 2015: Santo André
- 2016–2017: Portuguesa Santista
- 2018–2022: Atlético Mineiro

Senior career*
Years	Team	Apps	(Gls)
2022–	Atlético Mineiro	17	(0)
- * Club domestic league appearances and goals as of 21:10, 10 November 2026 (UTC)

Gabriel Delfim Ferreira (born 10 July 2002) is a Brazilian footballer who plays as a goalkeeper for Atlético Mineiro.

== Career ==
Born in Simonésia, Minas Gerais, Delfim joined Atlético Mineiro's youth sides in 2018, after representing Portuguesa Santista and Santo André. On 6 May 2021, he renewed his contract with the former club until April 2024.

Delfim was promoted to the first team in October 2022, as a third-choice behind Everson and Matheus Mendes. The following 3 February, he further extended his link until the end of 2026.

On 6 November 2024, after Everson was rested due to the 2024 Copa Libertadores final and Mendes was absent due to the death of his mother, Delfim made his professional – and Série A – debut, starting in a 1–0 away loss to Atlético Goianiense.

== Career statistics ==
As of 10 November 2026

Appearances and goals by club, season and competition
Club	Season	League			State League		Cup		Continental		Other		Total	
Club	Season	Division	Apps	Goals	Apps	Goals	Apps	Goals	Apps	Goals	Apps	Goals	Apps	Goals
Atlético Mineiro	2022	Série A	0	0	0	0	0	0	0	0	0	0	0	0
Atlético Mineiro	2023	Série A	0	0	0	0	0	0	0	0	—		0	0
Atlético Mineiro	2024	Série A	1	0	0	0	0	0	0	0	—		1	0
Atlético Mineiro	2025	Série A	2	0	3	0	0	0	0	0	—		5	0
Atlético Mineiro	2026	Série A	10	0	1	0	1	0	4 (Note: Appearance(s) in Copa Sudamericana)	0	—		16	0
Career total			13	0	4	0	1	0	4	0	0	0	22	0

== Honours ==
Atlético Mineiro

- Supercopa do Brasil: 2022
- Campeonato Mineiro: 2022, 2023, 2024, 2025
