= Natanael (footballer, born 2002) =

Brazilian footballer

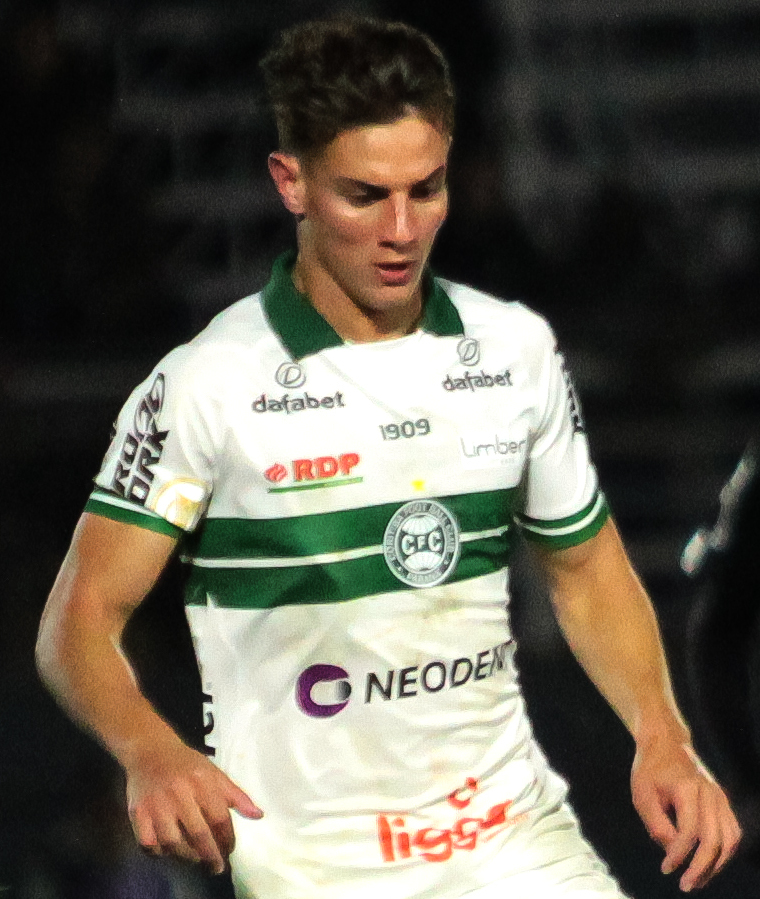
- Natanael playing for Coritiba in 2022

Personal information
- Full name: Natanael Moreira Milouski
- Date of birth: 5 January 2002 (age 24)
- Place of birth: Braganey, Brazil
- Height: 1.72 m (5 ft 8 in)
- Position: Right-back

Team information
- Current team: Atlético Mineiro
- Number: 2

Youth career
- 2016–2020: Coritiba

Senior career*
Years	Team	Apps	(Gls)
2020–2024	Coritiba	176	(3)
2025–	Atlético Mineiro	75	(1)
- * Club domestic league appearances and goals as of 21:14, 10 November 2026 (UTC)

Natanael Moreira Milouski (born 5 January 2002), known as Natanael, is a Brazilian footballer who plays as a right-back for Atlético Mineiro.

== Club career ==
Born in Braganey, Paraná, Natanael joined Coritiba's youth setup in 2016, for the under-14 team. He made his first team debut on 2 February 2020, starting in a 3–2 Campeonato Paranaense away win over Londrina.

On 24 July 2020, Natanael renewed his contract until December 2023. He made his Série A debut on 12 August, starting in a 0–1 loss at Bahia.

Natanael scored his first professional goal on 20 January 2021, netting his team's second in a 3–3 home draw against Fluminense. On 11 February, despite the club's relegation, he extended his link until the end of 2025.

Despite starting the 2021 campaign as a first-choice, Natanael became a backup to Igor during the 2021 Paranaense. He regained his starting spot in the 2021 Série B, being an important unit as the club achieved promotion back to the top tier.

On 18 January 2025, Natanael joined Atlético Mineiro on a four-year deal.

== Career statistics ==
As of 10 November 2026.

Club	Season	League			State league (Note: Includes Campeonato Paranaense, Campeonato Mineiro)		Cup		Continental		Other		Total	
Club	Season	Division	Apps	Goals	Apps	Goals	Apps	Goals	Apps	Goals	Apps	Goals	Apps	Goals
Coritiba	2020	Série A	17	1	4	0	0	0	—		—		21	1
Coritiba	2021	Série B	33	0	4	0	2	0	—		—		39	0
Coritiba	2022	Série A	25	0	3	0	0	0	—		—		28	0
Coritiba	2023	Série A	33	0	10	0	4	0	—		—		47	0
Coritiba	2024	Série B	36	2	11	0	1	0	—		—		48	2
Coritiba	Total		144	3	32	0	7	0	—		—		183	3
Atlético Mineiro	2025	Série A	34	1	9	0	6	0	11 (Note: Appearances in Copa Sudamericana)	2	—		60	3
Atlético Mineiro	2026	Série A	24	0	8	0	7	0	7	0	—		46	0
Atlético Mineiro	Total		58	1	17	0	13	0	18	2	—		106	3
Career total			202	4	49	0	20	0	18	2	0	0	289	6

== Honours ==
Coritiba

- Campeonato Paranaense: 2022

Atlético Mineiro

- Campeonato Mineiro: 2025

Individual

- Campeonato Mineiro Team of the Year: 2025
