= 2025 Clube Atlético Mineiro season =

Atlético Mineiro
2025 season
- President: Sérgio Coelho
- Head coach: Cuca (until 29 August); Lucas Gonçalves (interim, 29 August–2 September); Jorge Sampaoli (from 2 September)
- Stadium: Arena MRV
- Série A: 11th
- Campeonato Mineiro: Winners
- Copa do Brasil: Quarter-finals
- Copa Sudamericana: Runners-up
- Top goalscorer: League: Hulk (8 goals); All: Hulk (21 goals)
- Average home league attendance: 27,586
Home colours	Away colours	Third colours

The 2025 season was the 111th season in the existence of Clube Atlético Mineiro and the 19th consecutive season in the top flight of Brazilian football. In addition to the national league, Atlético Mineiro participated in this season's editions of the Campeonato Mineiro, the Copa do Brasil and the Copa Sudamericana.

== Players ==
=== First team squad ===
As of 24 October 2025.

Note: Flags indicate national team as defined under FIFA eligibility rules; some limited exceptions apply. Players may hold more than one non-FIFA nationality.

No.	Pos.	Nation	Player
1	GK	BRA	Gabriel Delfim
2	DF	BRA	Natanael
4	DF	BRA	Lyanco
5	MF	BRA	Alexsander
6	DF	PAR	Júnior Alonso
7	FW	BRA	Hulk (captain)
8	MF	ARG	Fausto Vera
10	MF	BRA	Gustavo Scarpa
11	MF	BRA	Bernard
13	DF	BRA	Guilherme Arana
14	DF	BRA	Vitor Hugo (on loan from Bahia)
16	DF	BRA	Ruan Tressoldi (on loan from Sassuolo)
17	MF	BRA	Igor Gomes
18	MF	BRA	Reinier
19	FW	BRA	João Marcelo
20	MF	BRA	Patrick
21	MF	ECU	Alan Franco

No.	Pos.	Nation	Player
22	GK	BRA	Everson
23	DF	CHI	Iván Román
25	MF	BRA	Gabriel Menino
26	DF	ARG	Renzo Saravia
28	FW	ARG	Tomás Cuello
30	FW	BRA	Isaac
31	GK	BRA	Robert
32	GK	BRA	Gabriel Átila
33	FW	BRA	Rony
37	FW	BRA	Júnior Santos
38	DF	BRA	Caio Paulista (on loan from Palmeiras)
39	FW	BRA	Caio Maia
42	FW	BRA	Cadu
48	MF	BRA	Mateus Iseppe
77	FW	BRA	Biel (on loan from Sporting CP)
92	FW	BRA	Dudu

=== Other players with first team appearances ===
Note: Flags indicate national team as defined under FIFA eligibility rules; some limited exceptions apply. Players may hold more than one non-FIFA nationality.

No.	Pos.	Nation	Player
—	MF	BRA	David Kauã
—	MF	BRA	Eric Soares
—	MF	BRA	Índio

No.	Pos.	Nation	Player
—	MF	BRA	Kauan Guilherme
—	MF	BRA	Zé Phelipe
—	FW	BRA	Lucas Louback

== Transfers ==
=== In ===
No.	Pos	Player	Transferred from	Fee	Date	Source
3	DF	(Brazil) Bruno Fuchs	(Russia) CSKA Moscow	€2,700,000	1 January 2025	
20	MF	(Brazil) Patrick	Palmeiras	Free transfer	1 January 2025	
25	MF	(Brazil) Gabriel Menino	Palmeiras	Free transfer	1 January 2025	
33	MF	(Brazil) Robert	Athletic-MG	€465,000	1 January 2025	
49	FW	(Brazil) Luiz Filipe	São Bernardo	Loan return	1 January 2025	
2	DF	(Brazil) Natanael	Coritiba	€1,120,000	18 January 2025	
37	FW	(Brazil) Júnior Santos	Botafogo	€7,600,000	24 January 2025	
28	FW	(Argentina) Tomás Cuello	Athletico Paranaense	€5,750,000	30 January 2025	
33	FW	(Brazil) Rony	Palmeiras	€6,000,000	14 February 2025	
38	DF	(Brazil) Caio Paulista	Palmeiras	Loan	14 February 2025	
23	DF	(Chile) Iván Román	(Chile) Palestino	€1,920,000	28 February 2025	
19	FW	(Brazil) João Marcelo	Guarani	€430,000	6 March 2025	
14	DF	(Brazil) Vitor Hugo	Bahia	Loan	12 March 2025	
92	FW	(Brazil) Dudu	Unattached	Free transfer	6 May 2025	
30	FW	(Brazil) Isaac	(Portugal) Nacional	Loan return	1 July 2025	
77	FW	(Brazil) Biel	(Portugal) Sporting CP	Loan	25 July 2025	
5	MF	(Brazil) Alexsander	(Saudi Arabia) Al-Ahli	€6,500,000	30 July 2025	
18	MF	(Brazil) Reinier	(Spain) Real Madrid	Free transfer	8 August 2025	
16	DF	(Brazil) Ruan Tressoldi	(Italy) Sassuolo	Loan	25 August 2025	

=== Out ===
No.	Pos	Player	Transferred to	Fee	Date	Source
10	FW	(Brazil) Paulinho	Palmeiras	€18,000,000	1 January 2025	
11	FW	(Chile) Eduardo Vargas	Unattached	End of contract	1 January 2025	
14	FW	(Brazil) Alan Kardec	Unattached	End of contract	1 January 2025	
25	DF	(Brazil) Mariano	Unattached	End of contract	1 January 2025	
31	GK	(Brazil) Matheus Mendes	América Mineiro	Loan	1 January 2025	
4	DF	(Uruguay) Mauricio Lemos	Vasco da Gama	Free transfer	15 January 2025	
15	MF	(Argentina) Matías Zaracho	(Argentina) Racing Club	€1,650,000	17 January 2025	
21	MF	(Argentina) Rodrigo Battaglia	(Argentina) Boca Juniors	€1,550,000	21 January 2025	
—	DF	(Brazil) Julio César	Coimbra	Loan return	21 January 2025	
—	DF	(Brazil) Kayque	Barra-SC	Loan return	4 February 2025	
33	MF	(Brazil) Robert	Atlético Goianiense	Loan	8 February 2025	
27	MF	(Brazil) Paulo Vitor	Criciúma	Loan	11 February 2025	
3	DF	(Brazil) Bruno Fuchs	Palmeiras	Loan	14 February 2025	
5	MF	(Brazil) Otávio	Fluminense	€1,370,000	19 February 2025	
45	FW	(Brazil) Alisson	(Ukraine) Shakhtar Donetsk	€14,000,000	10 March 2025	
40	MF	(Brazil) Vitinho	(Latvia) RFS	Loan	14 March 2025	
49	FW	(Brazil) Luiz Filipe	Mirassol	Free transfer	21 March 2025	
9	FW	(Brazil) Deyverson	Fortaleza	€1,150,000	28 March 2025	
—	MF	(Brazil) Gabriel Pfeifer	América Mineiro	Undisclosed	9 April 2025	
30	FW	(Colombia) Brahian Palacios	(United Arab Emirates) Al Wasl	Loan	1 July 2025	
—	MF	(Brazil) Bruninho	(Ukraine) Karpaty Lviv	€800,000	1 July 2025	
—	FW	(Brazil) Alisson Souza	(Portugal) União de Leiria	Undisclosed	16 July 2025	
—	FW	(Brazil) Fábio Gomes	(Mexico) Mazatlán	Free transfer	21 July 2025	
—	DF	(Brazil) Renan Santana	(Portugal) Famalicão	€1,500,000	22 July 2025	
44	MF	(Brazil) Rubens	(Russia) Dynamo Moscow	€9,000,000	31 July 2025	
47	DF	(Brazil) Rômulo	(Portugal) Sporting CP B	Loan	6 August 2025	
—	DF	(Brazil) Dudu Cruz	(Portugal) Felgueiras	Undisclosed	19 August 2025	
—	MF	(Brazil) João Rafael	(Portugal) Felgueiras	Undisclosed	19 August 2025	
—	GK	(Brazil) Matheus Mendes	(Portugal) Alverca	Undisclosed	20 August 2025	
16	DF	(Brazil) Igor Rabello	Fluminense	Free transfer	22 August 2025	
—	FW	(Brazil) Pedro Ataíde	(Cyprus) APOEL	Undisclosed	25 August 2025	
—	FW	(Brazil) Lucas Daniel	(Portugal) Académico de Viseu	Undisclosed	1 September 2025	
—	MF	(Brazil) Vitinho	Unattached	End of contract	23 October 2025	

=== Transfer summary ===
Undisclosed fees are not included in the transfer totals.

Expenditure

Total: ▼€32,485,000

Income

Total: ▲€49,020,000

Net total

Total: ▲€16,535,000

== Pre-season and friendlies ==
On 24 October 2024, Atlético Mineiro announced a pre-season tour in the United States, with matches against Cruzeiro and Orlando City as part of the 2025 FC Series.

18 January FC Series	Atlético Mineiro (Brazil)	0–0	(Brazil) Cruzeiro	Orlando, United States
15:00 UTC-5		Report		Stadium: Inter&Co Stadium; Attendance: 22,743; Referee: Marcos de Oliveira (United States)

25 January FC Series	Orlando City (United States)	0–0 (6–5 p)	(Brazil) Atlético Mineiro	Orlando, United States
15:00 UTC-5		Report		Stadium: Inter&Co Stadium; Referee: Joe Surgan (United States)
	Penalties
	Smith (penalty scored); Enrique (penalty scored); Brekalo (penalty scored); Angulo (penalty missed); Gallese (penalty scored); Freeman (penalty scored); Gerbet (penalty scored)		(penalty scored) Igor Gomes; (penalty scored) Palacios; (penalty scored) Rubens; (penalty missed) Deyverson; (penalty scored) Everson; (penalty scored) Otávio; (penalty missed) Bruno Fuchs

== Competitions ==
=== Overview ===
Competition	First match	Last match	Starting round	Final position	Record							
Competition	First match	Last match	Starting round	Final position	Pld	W	D	L	GF	GA	GD	Win %
Campeonato Brasileiro	29 March 2025	7 December 2025	Matchday 1	11th	38	12	12	14	43	44	−1	31.58
Campeonato Mineiro	19 January 2025	15 March 2025	First stage	Winners	12	7	4	1	17	3	+14	58.33
Copa do Brasil	18 February 2025	11 September 2025	First round	Quarter-finals	8	4	1	3	13	8	+5	50.00
Copa Sudamericana	1 April 2025	22 November 2025	Group stage	Runners-up	15	7	6	2	22	12	+10	46.67
Total					73	30	23	20	95	67	+28	41.10

Source: Soccerway

=== Campeonato Mineiro ===
==== First stage ====
Pos	Team	Pld	W	D	L	GF	GA	GD	Pts	Qualification or relegation
1	Tombense	8	5	1	2	8	5	+3	16	Knockout stage
2	Atlético Mineiro	8	4	4	0	9	2	+7	16	Knockout stage
3	Betim	8	4	3	1	12	5	+7	15	
4	Uberlândia	8	2	3	3	10	10	0	9	

Source: FMF

==== Matches ====
19 January 1	Aymorés	0–0	Atlético Mineiro	Ubá
11:00 UTC−3		Report		Stadium: Estádio Paulo Paschoalino; Attendance: 2,587; Referee: Felipe Fernandes de Lima

22 January 2	Atlético Mineiro	1–1	Democrata GV	Belo Horizonte
19:00 UTC−3	Dudu Cruz 41'	Report	Luann 1'	Stadium: Mineirão; Attendance: 7,300; Referee: Murilo Francisco Misson Júnior

26 January 3	Pouso Alegre	0–0	Atlético Mineiro	Pouso Alegre
16:00 UTC−3		Report		Stadium: Manduzão; Attendance: 1,649; Referee: Hieger Túlio Cardoso

29 January 4	Atlético Mineiro	1–1	América Mineiro	Belo Horizonte
22:00 UTC−3	Bernard 83'	Report	Fabinho 31'	Stadium: Mineirão; Attendance: 19,150; Referee: Murilo Francisco Misson Júnior

1 February 5	Villa Nova	0–1	Atlético Mineiro	Nova Lima
16:30 UTC−3		Report	Hulk 46'	Stadium: Estádio Castor Cifuentes; Attendance: 3,439; Referee: Vinícius Gomes do Amaral

4 February 6	Atlético Mineiro	1–0	Athletic Club	Belo Horizonte
21:30 UTC−3	Hulk 45+3'	Report		Stadium: Mineirão; Attendance: 15,965; Referee: André Luiz Skettino Policarpo Bento

9 February 7	Cruzeiro	0–2	Atlético Mineiro	Belo Horizonte
16:00 UTC−3		Report	Hulk 55', 87'	Stadium: Mineirão; Attendance: 60,834; Referee: Felipe Fernandes de Lima

12 February 8	Atlético Mineiro	3–0	Itabirito	Belo Horizonte
19:00 UTC−3	Cuello 43'; Hulk 60' (pen.); Deyverson 90+2'	Report		Stadium: Mineirão; Attendance: 25,607; Referee: Murilo Francisco Misson Júnior

==== Semi-finals ====
15 February First leg	Atlético Mineiro	2–0	Tombense	Belo Horizonte
16:30 UTC−3	Hulk 58', 65' (pen.)	Report		Stadium: Mineirão; Attendance: 27,342; Referee: André Luiz Skettino Policarpo Bento

22 February Second leg	Tombense	0–2 (0–4 agg.)	Atlético Mineiro	Sete Lagoas
19:00 UTC−3		Report	Rony 19'; Roger Carvalho 54' (o.g.)	Stadium: Arena do Jacaré; Attendance: 16,913; Referee: Murilo Francisco Misson Júnior

==== Finals ====
8 March First leg	Atlético Mineiro	4–0	América Mineiro	Belo Horizonte
16:30 UTC−3	Guilherme Arana 8'; Lyanco 41', 48'; Rony 64'	Report		Stadium: Mineirão; Attendance: 47,036; Referee: Vinícius Gomes do Amaral

15 March Second leg	América Mineiro	1–0 (1–4 agg.)	Atlético Mineiro	Belo Horizonte
16:30 UTC−3	Jonathas 77'	Report		Stadium: Mineirão; Attendance: 42,206; Referee: Davi de Oliveira Lacerda

=== Copa Sudamericana ===
==== Group stage ====
Pos	Team	Pld	W	D	L	GF	GA	GD	Pts	Qualification
1	(Peru) Cienciano	6	2	4	0	12	6	+6	10	Advance to round of 16
2	(Brazil) Atlético Mineiro	6	2	3	1	11	6	+5	9	Advance to knockout round play-offs
3	(Venezuela) Caracas	6	2	2	2	9	11	−2	8	
4	(Chile) Deportes Iquique	6	1	1	4	7	16	−9	4	

Source: CONMEBOL
Rules for classification: 1) Points; 2) Goal difference; 3) Goals scored; 4) Away goals scored; 5) CONMEBOL ranking.

1 April 1	Cienciano (Peru)	0–0	(Brazil) Atlético Mineiro	Cusco, Peru
21:30 UTC−3		Report		Stadium: Estadio Garcilaso; Attendance: 15,683; Referee: Leandro Rey Hilfer (Argentina)

10 April 2	Atlético Mineiro (Brazil)	4–0	(Chile) Deportes Iquique	Belo Horizonte, Brazil
21:30 UTC−3	Rony 1'; Hulk 11' (pen.); Natanael 35'; Gustavo Scarpa 66' (pen.)	Report		Stadium: Mineirão; Attendance: 0 Referee: Juan Benítez (Paraguay)

23 April 3	Caracas (Venezuela)	1–1	(Brazil) Atlético Mineiro	Caracas, Venezuela
21:30 UTC−3	De Santis 66'	Report	Rodríguez 24' (o.g.)	Stadium: Estadio Olímpico de la UCV; Attendance: 4,060; Referee: Darío Herrera (Argentina)

8 May 4	Deportes Iquique (Chile)	3–2	(Brazil) Atlético Mineiro	Iquique, Chile
19:00 UTC−3	Álvaro Ramos 34', 53'; Orellana 60'	Report	Rubens 10'; Bernard 78'	Stadium: Estadio Tierra de Campeones; Attendance: 5,508; Referee: Leandro Rey Hilfer (Argentina)

15 May 5	Atlético Mineiro (Brazil)	3–1	(Venezuela) Caracas	Belo Horizonte, Brazil
21:30 UTC−3	Edet 28' (o.g.); Cuello 48'; Rony 77'	Report	De Santis 59' (pen.)	Stadium: Arena MRV; Attendance: 0 Referee: José Burgos (Uruguay)

29 May 6	Atlético Mineiro (Brazil)	1–1	(Peru) Cienciano	Belo Horizonte, Brazil
21:30 UTC−3	Lyanco 43'	Report	Cueva 45+7'	Stadium: Arena MRV; Attendance: 26,426; Referee: Juan Benítez (Paraguay)

==== Knockout round play-offs ====
17 July First leg	Atlético Bucaramanga (Colombia)	0–1	(Brazil) Atlético Mineiro	Bucaramanga, Colombia
21:30 UTC−3		Report	Hulk 68' (pen.)	Stadium: Estadio Américo Montanini; Attendance: 9,762; Referee: Alexis Herrera (Venezuela)

24 July Second leg	Atlético Mineiro (Brazil)	0–1 (1–1 agg.) (3–1 p)	(Colombia) Atlético Bucaramanga	Belo Horizonte, Brazil
21:30 UTC−3		Report	Mena 45'	Stadium: Arena MRV; Attendance: 22,653; Referee: Esteban Ostojich (Uruguay)
	Penalties
	Hulk (penalty scored); Gustavo Scarpa (penalty missed); Bernard (penalty missed); Gabriel Menino (penalty scored); Everson (penalty scored)		(penalty scored) Chávez; (penalty missed) Henao; (penalty missed) Mena; (penalty missed) Zárate

==== Round of 16 ====
14 August First leg	Atlético Mineiro (Brazil)	2–1	(Argentina) Godoy Cruz	Belo Horizonte, Brazil
19:00 UTC−3	Cuello 67'; Hulk 89'	Report	Andino 37'	Stadium: Arena MRV; Attendance: 23,247; Referee: Alexis Herrera (Venezuela)

21 August Second leg	Godoy Cruz (Argentina)	0–1 (1–3 agg.)	(Brazil) Atlético Mineiro	Mendoza, Argentina
19:00 UTC−3		Report	Natanael 48'	Stadium: Estadio Malvinas Argentinas; Attendance: 5,569; Referee: Felipe González (Chile)

==== Quarter-finals ====
17 September First leg	Bolívar (Bolivia)	2–2	(Brazil) Atlético Mineiro	La Paz, Bolivia
19:00 UTC−3	Robson Matheus 48'; Romero 88' (pen.)	Report	Alexsander 45'; Vitor Hugo 45+6'	Stadium: Estadio Hernando Siles; Referee: Kevin Ortega (Peru)

24 September Second leg	Atlético Mineiro (Brazil)	1–0 (3–2 agg.)	(Bolivia) Bolívar	Belo Horizonte, Brazil
19:00 UTC−3	Bernard 90+1'	Report		Stadium: Arena MRV; Attendance: 34,102; Referee: Facundo Tello (Argentina)

==== Semi-finals ====
21 October First leg	Independiente del Valle (Ecuador)	1–1	(Brazil) Atlético Mineiro	Quito, Ecuador
21:30 UTC−3	Sornoza 11' (pen.)	Report	Dudu 90+1'	Stadium: Estadio Banco Guayaquil; Attendance: 5,151; Referee: Carlos Betancur (Colombia)

28 October Second leg	Atlético Mineiro (Brazil)	3–1 (4–2 agg.)	(Ecuador) Independiente del Valle	Belo Horizonte, Brazil
21:30 UTC−3	Arana 36'; Bernard 43'; Hulk 73'	Report	Spinelli 63'	Stadium: Arena MRV; Attendance: 40,185; Referee: Esteban Ostojich (Uruguay)

==== Final ====
22 November Final	Lanús (Argentina)	0–0 (a.e.t.) (5–4 p)	(Brazil) Atlético Mineiro	Asunción, Paraguay
17:00 UTC−3		Report		Stadium: Estadio Defensores del Chaco; Attendance: 44,164; Referee: Piero Maza (Chile)
	Penalties
	Bou (penalty missed); Izquierdoz (penalty scored); Marcich (penalty scored); Aquino (penalty scored); Acosta (penalty missed); Cardozo (penalty scored); Watson (penalty scored)		(penalty missed) Hulk; (penalty scored) Gustavo Scarpa; (penalty scored) Igor Gomes; (penalty missed) Biel Teixeira; (penalty scored) Everson; (penalty scored) Alexsander; (penalty missed) Vitor Hugo

=== Campeonato Brasileiro ===
==== Standings ====
Pos	Team	Pld	W	D	L	GF	GA	GD	Pts	Qualification or relegation
9	Grêmio	38	13	10	15	47	50	−3	49	Qualification for Copa Sudamericana group stage
10	Red Bull Bragantino	38	14	6	18	45	57	−12	48	Qualification for Copa Sudamericana group stage
11	Atlético Mineiro	38	12	12	14	43	44	−1	48	Qualification for Copa Sudamericana group stage
12	Santos	38	12	11	15	45	50	−5	47	Qualification for Copa Sudamericana group stage
13	Corinthians	38	12	11	15	42	47	−5	47	Qualification for Copa Libertadores group stage (Note: Corinthians qualified for the Copa Libertadores group stage by winning the 2025 Copa do Brasil.)

Source: CBF
Rules for classification: 1) points; 2) wins; 3) goal difference; 4) goals scored; 5) head-to-head results (only between two teams); 6) fewest red cards; 7) fewest yellow cards; 8) drawing of lots.

==== Result by round ====
Round	1	2	3	4	5	6	7	8	9	10	11	12	13	14	15	16	17	18	19	20	21	22	23	24	25	26	27	28	29	30	31	32	33	34	35	36	37	38
Result	L	D	D	L	W	D	W	W	D	D	W	W	L	W	L	D	L	W	D	L	L	L	D	L	W	D	L	D	L	W	D	W	W	L	L	D	L	W
Position	16	18	17	19	17	17	10	7	9	10	8	7	8	9	9	9	13	10	10	11	12	14	13	15	14	14	15	14	15	13	13	11	9	13	13	11	11	11

Source: CBF
P = Postponed

==== Matches ====
29 March 1	Grêmio	2–1	Atlético Mineiro	Porto Alegre
18:30 UTC−3	Arezo 33'; Edenilson 45'	Report	Rony 75'	Stadium: Arena do Grêmio; Attendance: 20,111; Referee: Raphael Claus

6 April 2	Atlético Mineiro	0–0	São Paulo	Belo Horizonte
16:00 UTC−3		Report		Stadium: Mineirão; Attendance: 28,415; Referee: Ramon Abatti Abel

13 April 3	Atlético Mineiro	2–2	Vitória	Belo Horizonte
20:30 UTC−3	Fausto Vera 57'; Igor Gomes 87'	Report	Lucas Halter 47'; Matheuzinho 65'	Stadium: Mineirão; Attendance: 23,234; Referee: Davi de Oliveira Lacerda

16 April 4	Santos	2–0	Atlético Mineiro	Santos
21:30 UTC−3	Zé Ivaldo 24'; Barreal 27'	Report		Stadium: Vila Belmiro; Attendance: 10,360; Referee: Bráulio da Silva Machado

20 April 5	Atlético Mineiro	1–0	Botafogo	Belo Horizonte
16:00 UTC−3	Cuello 48'	Report		Stadium: Mineirão; Attendance: 24,528; Referee: Ramon Abatti Abel

26 April 6	Mirassol	2–2	Atlético Mineiro	Mirassol
18:30 UTC−3	Edson Carioca 12'; Reinaldo 90+2'	Report	Rony 70'; Hulk 80' (pen.)	Stadium: Estádio José Maria de Campos Maia; Attendance: 4,966; Referee: Davi de Oliveira Lacerda

5 May 7	Juventude	0–1	Atlético Mineiro	Caxias do Sul
20:00 UTC−3		Report	Gustavo Scarpa 30'	Stadium: Estádio Alfredo Jaconi; Attendance: 7,486; Referee: Bruno Pereira Vasconcelos

11 May 8	Atlético Mineiro	3–2	Fluminense	Belo Horizonte
17:30 UTC−3	Rubens 77'; Júnior Santos 84'; Igor Gomes 90+4'	Report	Canobbio 56'; Serna 88'	Stadium: Arena MRV; Attendance: 25,018; Referee: Ramon Abatti Abel

18 May 9	Cruzeiro	0–0	Atlético Mineiro	Belo Horizonte
20:30 UTC−3		Report		Stadium: Mineirão; Attendance: 61,106; Referee: Flávio Rodrigues de Souza

24 May 10	Atlético Mineiro	0–0	Corinthians	Belo Horizonte
21:00 UTC−3		Report		Stadium: Arena MRV; Attendance: 38,154; Referee: Rafael Rodrigo Klein

1 June 11	Ceará	0–1	Atlético Mineiro	Fortaleza
18:30 UTC−3		Report	Rony 78'	Stadium: Arena Castelão; Attendance: 50,070; Referee: Alex Gomes Stefano

12 June 12	Atlético Mineiro	2–0	Internacional	Belo Horizonte
21:30 UTC−3	Vitão 30' (o.g.); Júnior Santos 90+4'	Report		Stadium: Arena MRV; Attendance: 24,781; Referee: Flávio Rodrigues de Souza

12 July 13	Bahia	2–1	Atlético Mineiro	Salvador
21:00 UTC−3	Luciano Juba 53'; Michel Araújo 90+7'	Report	Hulk 90+1'	Stadium: Arena Fonte Nova; Attendance: 30,249; Referee: Davi De Oliveira Lacerda

20 July 15	Palmeiras	3–2	Atlético Mineiro	São Paulo
17:30 UTC−3	Lucas Evangelista 33'; Júnior Alonso 51' (o.g.); Maurício 77'	Report	Hulk 42', 90+1'	Stadium: Allianz Parque; Attendance: 34,970; Referee: Alex Gomes Stefano

27 July 17	Flamengo	1–0	Atlético Mineiro	Rio de Janeiro
20:30 UTC−3	Léo Ortiz 75'	Report		Stadium: Maracanã; Attendance: 54,550; Referee: Ramon Abatti Abel

3 August 18	Atlético Mineiro	2–1	Red Bull Bragantino	Belo Horizonte
18:30 UTC−3	Igor Gomes 7'; Natanael 81'	Report	Laquintana 77'	Stadium: Arena MRV; Attendance: 20,092; Referee: Bruno Arleu de Araújo

10 August 19	Vasco	1–1	Atlético Mineiro	Rio de Janeiro
16:00 UTC−3	Vegetti 18' (pen.)	Report	Gabriel Menino 1'	Stadium: Estádio São Januário; Attendance: 16,157; Referee: Davi De Oliveira Lacerda

17 August 20	Atlético Mineiro	1–3	Grêmio	Belo Horizonte
16:00 UTC−3	Gustavo Scarpa 38'	Report	Edenilson 45'; Balbuena 58'; Aravena 90'	Stadium: Arena MRV; Attendance: 34,774; Referee: Alex Gomes Stefano

24 August 21	São Paulo	2–0	Atlético Mineiro	São Paulo
20:30 UTC−3	Pablo Maia 23'; Tapia 81'	Report		Stadium: Morumbi; Attendance: 26,364; Referee: Lucas Casagrande

31 August 22	Vitória	1–0	Atlético Mineiro	Salvador
18:30 UTC−3	Erick 6'	Report		Stadium: Barradão; Attendance: 28,898; Referee: Alex Gomes Stefano

14 September 23	Atlético Mineiro	1–1	Santos	Belo Horizonte
16:00 UTC−3	Igor Gomes 59'	Report	Tiquinho Soares 87'	Stadium: Arena MRV; Attendance: 38,262; Referee: Bruno Arleu de Araújo

20 September 24	Botafogo	1–0	Atlético Mineiro	Rio de Janeiro
18:30 UTC−3	Santiago Rodríguez 48'	Report		Stadium: Estádio Nilton Santos; Attendance: 11,816; Referee: Flávio Rodrigues de Souza

27 September 25	Atlético Mineiro	1–0	Mirassol	Belo Horizonte
21:00 UTC−3	Vitor Hugo 9'	Report		Stadium: Arena MRV; Attendance: 22,864; Referee: Rafael Rodrigo Klein

30 September 26	Atlético Mineiro	0–0	Juventude	Belo Horizonte
21:30 UTC−3		Report		Stadium: Arena MRV; Attendance: 26,567; Referee: Lucas Casagrande

4 October 27	Fluminense	3–0	Atlético Mineiro	Rio de Janeiro
18:30 UTC−3	Samuel Xavier 15'; Serna 58'; Keno 90+1'	Report		Stadium: Maracanã; Attendance: 20,198; Referee: Davi de Oliveira Lacerda

8 October 14	Atlético Mineiro	3–1	Sport	Belo Horizonte
19:30 UTC−3	Vitor Hugo 9'; Arana 38'; Rony 62'	Report	Derik Lacerda 82' (pen.)	Stadium: Arena MRV; Attendance: 25,093; Referee: Alex Gomes Stefano

15 October 28	Atlético Mineiro	1–1	Cruzeiro	Belo Horizonte
21:30 UTC−3	Ruan Tressoldi 51'	Report	Matheus Pereira 48'	Stadium: Arena MRV; Attendance: 40,388; Referee: Paulo César Zanovelli da Silva

18 October 29	Corinthians	1–0	Atlético Mineiro	São Paulo
18:30 UTC−3	Maycon 49'	Report		Stadium: Neo Química Arena; Attendance: 39,640; Referee: Alex Gomes Stefano

25 October 30	Atlético Mineiro	1–0	Ceará	Belo Horizonte
16:00 UTC−3	Alan Franco 1'	Report		Stadium: Arena MRV; Attendance: 33,694; Referee: Bruno Arleu de Araújo

2 November 31	Internacional	0–0	Atlético Mineiro	Porto Alegre
18:30 UTC−3		Report		Stadium: Estádio Beira-Rio; Attendance: 32,644; Referee: Alex Gomes Stefano

5 November 32	Atlético Mineiro	3–0	Bahia	Belo Horizonte
20:00 UTC−3	Hulk 66'; Igor Gomes 75'; Biel Teixeira 77'	Report		Stadium: Arena MRV; Attendance: 25,506; Referee: Davi de Oliveira Lacerda

8 November 33	Sport	2–4	Atlético Mineiro	Recife
16:00 UTC−3	Léo Pereira 18', 63'	Report	Hulk 68'; Rony 70', 83'; Alexsander 81'	Stadium: Ilha do Retiro; Attendance: 5,095; Referee: Matheus Delgado Candançan

12 November 16	Atlético Mineiro	3–3	Fortaleza	Belo Horizonte
20:30 UTC−3	Hulk 8'; Vitor Hugo 45+2'; Dudu 61'	Report	Deyverson 47', 67' (pen.), 90+3'	Stadium: Arena MRV; Attendance: 39,246; Referee: Sávio Pereira Sampaio

16 November 37	Red Bull Bragantino	2–0	Atlético Mineiro	Bragança Paulista
19:00 UTC−3	Lucas Barbosa 55'; Gustavo Marques 59'	Report		Stadium: Estádio Cícero de Souza Marques; Attendance: 4,472; Referee: Marcelo de Lima Henrique

25 November 36	Atlético Mineiro	1–1	Flamengo	Belo Horizonte
21:30 UTC−3	Bernard 34'	Report	Bruno Henrique 90+2'	Stadium: Arena MRV; Attendance: 18,321; Referee: Rafael Rodrigo Klein

30 November 35	Fortaleza	1–0	Atlético Mineiro	Fortaleza
18:30 UTC−3	Pochettino 41'	Report		Stadium: Arena Castelão; Attendance: 51,793; Referee: Davi De Oliveira Lacerda

3 December 34	Atlético Mineiro	0–3	Palmeiras	Belo Horizonte
21:30 UTC−3		Report	José López 9'; Allan 20'; Luighi 81'	Stadium: Arena MRV; Attendance: 13,878; Referee: Rafael Rodrigo Klein

7 December 38	Atlético Mineiro	5–0	Vasco	Belo Horizonte
16:00 UTC−3	Júnior Alonso 18'; Hulk 32'; Dudu 49', 69'; Victor Luis 75' (o.g.)	Report		Stadium: Arena MRV; Attendance: 20,622; Referee: Lucas Paulo Torezin

=== Copa do Brasil ===
==== First round ====
18 February Single Match	Tocantinópolis	0–2	Atlético Mineiro	Tocantinópolis
18:00 UTC−3		Report	Hulk 87' (pen.); Rony 90+5'	Stadium: Estádio Ribeirão; Attendance: 5,593; Referee: Marcelo de Lima Henrique

==== Second round ====
5 March Single Match	Atlético Mineiro	4–1	Manaus	Belo Horizonte
19:30 UTC−3	Alisson 18'; Cuello 32'; Rony 48'; Deyverson 65'	Report	Renan 52'	Stadium: Mineirão; Attendance: 15,815; Referee: Ramon Abatti Abel

==== Third round ====
29 April First leg	Maringá	2–2	Atlético Mineiro	Maringá
19:30 UTC−3	Maranhão 17'; Fausto Vera 51' (o.g.)	Report	Igor Rabello 43'; Hulk 70'	Stadium: Estádio Willie Davids; Attendance: 11,024; Referee: Denis da Silva Ribeiro Serafim

21 May Second leg	Atlético Mineiro	4–0 (6–2 agg.)	Maringá	Belo Horizonte
21:30 UTC−3	Rubens 45+4'; Patrick 52'; Rony 78'; Lyanco 88'	Report		Stadium: Arena MRV; Attendance: 19,853; Referee: Bruno Arleu de Araújo

==== Round of 16 ====
31 July First leg	Flamengo	0–1	Atlético Mineiro	Rio de Janeiro
21:30 UTC−3		Report	Cuello 66'	Stadium: Maracanã; Attendance: 64,681; Referee: Raphael Claus

6 August Second leg	Atlético Mineiro	0–1 (1–1 agg.) (4–3 p)	Flamengo	Belo Horizonte
19:00 UTC−3		Report	Everton 21'	Stadium: Arena MRV; Attendance: 38,873; Referee: Rafael Rodrigo Klein
	Penalties
	Hulk (penalty scored); Gustavo Scarpa (penalty scored); Júnior Alonso (penalty missed); Igor Gomes (penalty scored); Everson (penalty scored)		De Arrascaeta (penalty scored); Jorginho (penalty scored); Saúl (penalty scored); Samuel Lino (penalty missed); Wallace Yan (penalty missed)

==== Quarter-finals ====
27 August Second leg	Atlético Mineiro	0–2	Cruzeiro	Belo Horizonte
19:30 UTC−3		Report	Fabrício Bruno 50'; Kaio Jorge 64'	Stadium: Arena MRV; Attendance: 44,286; Referee: Ramon Abatti Abel

11 September Second leg	Cruzeiro	2–0 (4–0 agg.)	Atlético Mineiro	Belo Horizonte
19:30 UTC−3	Kaio Jorge 5', 48'	Report		Stadium: Mineirão; Attendance: 61,584; Referee: Rafael Rodrigo Klein

== Statistics ==
=== Squad appearances and goals ===
No.	Pos	Nat	Player	Total		Brasileiro		Mineiro		Copa do Brasil		Sudamericana	
No.	Pos	Nat	Player	Apps	Goals	Apps	Goals	Apps	Goals	Apps	Goals	Apps	Goals
Goalkeepers
1	GK	(Brazil) BRA	Gabriel Delfim	5	0	2	0	3	0	0	0	0	0
22	GK	(Brazil) BRA	Everson	68	0	36	0	9	0	8	0	15	0
31	GK	(Brazil) BRA	Robert	0	0	0	0	0	0	0	0	0	0
32	GK	(Brazil) BRA	Gabriel Átila	0	0	0	0	0	0	0	0	0	0
Defenders
2	DF	(Brazil) BRA	Natanael	60	3	24+10	1	9	0	6	0	7+4	2
4	DF	(Brazil) BRA	Lyanco	42	4	17	0	9	2	6	1	10	1
6	DF	(Paraguay) PAR	Júnior Alonso	61	1	31	1	9	0	8	0	13	0
13	DF	(Brazil) BRA	Guilherme Arana	49	3	20+5	1	9	1	5	0	9+1	1
14	DF	(Brazil) BRA	Vitor Hugo	34	4	20+3	3	0	0	2	0	7+2	1
16	DF	(Brazil) BRA	Ruan Tressoldi	14	1	7+4	1	0	0	0	0	3	0
23	DF	(Chile) CHI	Iván Román	16	0	8+4	0	0	0	0	0	1+3	0
26	DF	(Argentina) ARG	Renzo Saravia	31	0	12+7	0	0+2	0	1+1	0	4+4	0
38	DF	(Brazil) BRA	Caio Paulista	36	0	10+10	0	0+2	0	0+4	0	5+5	0
Midfielders
5	MF	(Brazil) BRA	Alexsander	24	2	8+6	1	0	0	2+2	0	3+3	1
8	MF	(Argentina) ARG	Fausto Vera	32	1	15+3	1	0+1	0	2+2	0	4+5	0
10	MF	(Brazil) BRA	Gustavo Scarpa	66	3	25+11	2	9	0	8	0	11+2	1
11	MF	(Brazil) BRA	Bernard	52	5	12+18	1	0+9	1	0+3	0	6+4	3
17	MF	(Brazil) BRA	Igor Gomes	60	5	21+13	5	0+5	0	2+6	0	7+6	0
18	MF	(Brazil) BRA	Reinier	20	0	3+10	0	0	0	0+2	0	1+4	0
20	MF	(Brazil) BRA	Patrick	10	1	2+1	0	0+3	0	1	1	1+2	0
21	MF	(Ecuador) ECU	Alan Franco	56	1	30	1	9	0	6+1	0	10	0
25	MF	(Brazil) BRA	Gabriel Menino	45	1	9+14	1	9	0	5	0	5+3	0
48	MF	(Brazil) BRA	Mateus Iseppe	1	0	0+1	0	0	0	0	0	0	0
	MF	(Brazil) BRA	David Kauã	3	0	0	0	3	0	0	0	0	0
	MF	(Brazil) BRA	Eric Soares	3	0	0	0	2+1	0	0	0	0	0
	MF	(Brazil) BRA	Índio	3	0	0	0	0+3	0	0	0	0	0
	MF	(Brazil) BRA	Kauan Guilherme	1	0	0	0	0+1	0	0	0	0	0
	MF	(Brazil) BRA	Zé Phelipe	2	0	0	0	0+2	0	0	0	0	0
Forwards
7	FW	(Brazil) BRA	Hulk	61	21	27+6	8	7+1	7	6+1	2	10+3	4
19	FW	(Brazil) BRA	João Marcelo	11	0	0+7	0	0	0	0	0	0+4	0
28	FW	(Argentina) ARG	Tomás Cuello	41	6	14+2	1	7+1	1	8	2	7+2	2
30	FW	(Brazil) BRA	Isaac	1	0	0+1	0	0	0	0	0	0	0
33	FW	(Brazil) BRA	Rony	62	13	29+6	6	3+1	2	6+2	3	13+2	2
37	FW	(Brazil) BRA	Júnior Santos	28	2	1+15	2	2+2	0	0+2	0	1+5	0
39	FW	(Brazil) BRA	Caio Maia	0	0	0	0	0	0	0	0	0	0
42	FW	(Brazil) BRA	Cadu	1	0	0+1	0	0	0	0	0	0	0
77	FW	(Brazil) BRA	Biel	24	1	6+11	1	0	0	0+2	0	0+5	0
92	FW	(Brazil) BRA	Dudu	26	4	14+4	3	0	0	1+1	0	4+2	1
	FW	(Brazil) BRA	Lucas Louback	3	0	0	0	3	0	0	0	0	0
Players who have made an appearance this season but have left the club
5	MF	(Brazil) BRA	Otávio	3	0	0	0	0+3	0	0	0	0	0
9	FW	(Brazil) BRA	Deyverson	10	2	0	0	0+8	1	1+1	1	0	0
16	DF	(Brazil) BRA	Igor Rabello	8	1	2+2	0	0+1	0	1+1	1	0+1	0
27	MF	(Brazil) BRA	Paulo Vitor	3	0	0	0	3	0	0	0	0	0
30	FW	(Colombia) COL	Brahian Palacios	7	0	0+1	0	0+3	0	0+1	0	1+1	0
33	MF	(Brazil) BRA	Robert	4	0	0	0	3+1	0	0	0	0	0
40	MF	(Brazil) BRA	Vitinho	1	0	0	0	1	0	0	0	0	0
44	MF	(Brazil) BRA	Rubens	32	3	11+2	1	8+1	0	2+2	1	6	1
45	FW	(Brazil) BRA	Alisson	2	1	0	0	0+1	0	1	1	0	0
47	DF	(Brazil) BRA	Rômulo	6	0	2+1	0	0	0	0+1	0	1+1	0
49	FW	(Brazil) BRA	Luiz Filipe	3	0	0	0	3	0	0	0	0	0
	DF	(Brazil) BRA	Dudu Cruz	3	1	0	0	3	1	0	0	0	0
	DF	(Brazil) BRA	Julio César	3	0	0	0	3	0	0	0	0	0
	DF	(Brazil) BRA	Kayque	3	0	0	0	3	0	0	0	0	0
	DF	(Brazil) BRA	Renan Santana	3	0	0	0	3	0	0	0	0	0
	MF	(Brazil) BRA	Gabriel Pfeifer	1	0	0	0	0+1	0	0	0	0	0
	MF	(Brazil) BRA	João Rafael	1	0	0	0	0+1	0	0	0	0	0
	FW	(Brazil) BRA	Alisson Souza	2	0	0	0	0+2	0	0	0	0	0
	FW	(Brazil) BRA	Lucas Daniel	3	0	0	0	0+3	0	0	0	0	0
	FW	(Brazil) BRA	Pedro Ataíde	2	0	0	0	0+1	0	0	0	0+1	0
