= Patrick (footballer, born 2004) =

Brazilian footballer born 2004

Personal information
- Full name: Patrick Roberto da Silva Campos
- Date of birth: 19 March 2004 (age 22)
- Place of birth: Juiz de Fora, Brazil
- Height: 1.87 m (6 ft 2 in)
- Position: Defensive midfielder

Team information
- Current team: Red Bull Bragantino (on loan from Atlético Mineiro)

Youth career
- Flamengo
- 2019: Volta Redonda
- 2021: Cruzeiro
- 2021–2022: Ferroviária
- 2022–2024: Palmeiras

Senior career*
Years	Team	Apps	(Gls)
2024	Palmeiras	0	(0)
2025–	Atlético Mineiro	6	(0)
2026–	→ Red Bull Bragantino (loan)	0	(0)
- * Club domestic league appearances and goals as of 00:28, 10 June 2025 (UTC)

Patrick Roberto da Silva Campos (born 19 March 2004), known simply as Patrick, is a Brazilian footballer who plays as a defensive midfielder for Red Bull Bragantino, on loan from Atlético Mineiro.

== Club career ==
Born in Juiz de Fora, Minas Gerais, Patrick had spells as a youth player at Flamengo, Volta Redonda, Cruzeiro, Ferroviária and Palmeiras. For the latter club, he won the Copa São Paulo de Futebol Júnior in 2023 and the Campeonato Brasileiro Sub-20 in 2024.

On 31 December 2024, Patrick joined Atlético Mineiro on a four-year deal with an option for an additional year's extension. He made his debut for the club – and as a professional player – in the first leg of the 2025 Campeonato Mineiro semifinal, in which Atlético defeated Tombense 2–0. On 21 May, in a Copa do Brasil third round tie against Maringá, Patrick scored his first goal and helped Atlético clinch qualification with a 4–0 win.

On 11 September 2026, Patrick joined Red Bull Bragantino on loan.

== Career statistics ==
As of 11 September 2026

Club	Season	League			State League		Cup		Continental		Other		Total	
Club	Season	Division	Apps	Goals	Apps	Goals	Apps	Goals	Apps	Goals	Apps	Goals	Apps	Goals
Palmeiras	2024	Série A	0	0	—		—		—		—		0	0
Atlético Mineiro	2025	Série A	3	0	3	0	1	1	3 (Note: Appearance(s) in Copa Sudamericana)	0	—		10	1
Atlético Mineiro	2026	Série A	0	0	0	0	0	0	0	0	—		0	0
Atlético Mineiro	Total		3	0	3	0	1	1	3	0	0	0	10	1
Career total			3	0	3	0	1	1	3	0	0	0	10	1

== Honours ==
Atlético Mineiro

- Campeonato Mineiro: 2025
