= List of Clube Atlético Mineiro seasons =

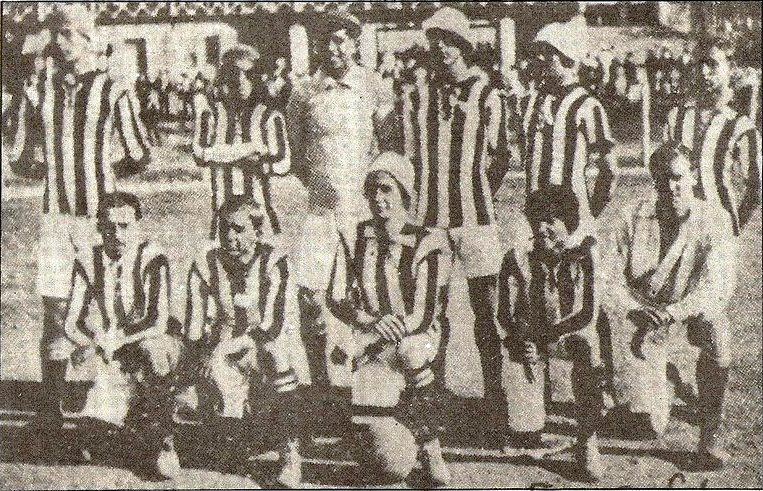
The Atlético Mineiro team that won the inaugural Campeonato Mineiro in 1915

Clube Atlético Mineiro is a Brazilian football club based in Belo Horizonte, Minas Gerais, Brazil. The club was formed in 1908 as Athletico Mineiro Foot Ball Club, and changed its name to the current one in 1913. Atlético Mineiro played its first competitive match on 15 July 1915, when it entered the inaugural Campeonato Mineiro, the state league of Minas Gerais.

Atlético Mineiro's first official trophy was the Campeonato Mineiro in 1915, the inaugural edition of the competition, which the club has won a record 43 times. Atlético's only Campeonato Brasileiro title was won in 1971, and the first Copa do Brasil came in 2014. At international level, Atlético was the most successful club of the Copa CONMEBOL with two wins, and has won the Copa Libertadores and the Recopa Sudamericana once each. The club's most recent trophy is the 2015 Campeonato Mineiro.

The list details the club's year-to-year records in the major competitions it took part in, starting in the 1915 season, year of the first edition of the Campeonato Mineiro.

== History ==
Atlético Mineiro was formed in 1908 in Belo Horizonte, and first took part in and won an official competition in 1915, the inaugural edition of the Campeonato Mineiro, the state league of Minas Gerais. The club has played in all editions of the Mineiro, winning the competition a record 43 times. From 1915 to 1958, the only regular competition in which the club played was the state league, but the club also took part in and won the 1937 Copa dos Campeões Estaduais, contested by the state league champions from Minas Gerais (Atlético), Rio de Janeiro (Fluminense), São Paulo (Portuguesa) and Espírito Santo (Rio Branco).

From 1959 to 1968, the club appeared in some editions of the Taça Brasil, the first annual nationwide competition in Brazil, contested in cup format between state league champions, created in order to select Brazil's representatives in the Copa Libertadores. From 1967 to 1970, Atlético participated in the Torneio Roberto Gomes Pedrosa, a new national tournament which included more teams than the Taça Brasil, but played during the same season, and from 1971 onwards, it took part in the Campeonato Brasileiro Série A, a national championship that replaced both previous competitions. The club has spent almost every season on the top flight of the Brazilian football league system, the exception being 2006, when it played in the Série B, following relegation in 2005. Atlético won the inaugural Brasileiro in 1971, and finished second on five occasions. In 1989, a new national cup competition was introduced, Copa do Brasil, which Atlético has won once, taking part in all but one of its seasons. Throughout its history, Atlético has also participated in other short-lived national tournaments, such as the Torneio do Povo and the Copa dos Campeões Brasileiros in the 1970s, the Copa Sul-Minas and the Copa Centro-Oeste in the 2000s, and the Brazilian Primeira Liga in the 2010s.

Atlético Mineiro's involvement in official international club football dates back to 1972, when the club qualified for the Copa Libertadores as Brazilian champions in 1971, its first continental participation. In total, the club has participated in 23 continental competition editions, and in one edition of an intercontinental competition, winning four titles and appearing in three more finals as runner-up. Atlético Mineiro won its first continental trophy in 1992, the inaugural Copa CONMEBOL, a competition which it won again in 1997. In 2013 the club won its first Copa Libertadores, a title followed by the 2014 Recopa Sudamericana. The club's first and only appearance in an intercontinental competition happened in the 2013 FIFA Club World Cup, in which it finished in third place.

== Key ==
Table headers
- P – Number of games played
- W – Number of gameswon
- D – Number of games drawn
- L – Number of games lost
- GF – Number of goals scored
- GA – Number of goals conceded
- Pts = Number of points at the end
- Pos = Final position
League divisions
- Mineiro – Campeonato Mineiro (state)
- Taça Brasil – Taça Brasil (national)
- Robertão – Torneio Roberto Gomes Pedrosa (national)
- Série A – Campeonato Brasileiro Série A (national)
- Série B – Campeonato Brasileiro Série B (national)
- Super Mineiro – Supercampeonato Mineiro (state)
Results and rounds
- Group – Group stage
- R1, R2, R3 – First, second, third round
- R16 – Round of 16
- QF – Quarter-finals
- SF – Semi-finals
- RU – Runner-up
- W – Winner

Champion	Runner-up	Promoted ↑	Relegated ↓

== Seasons ==
Season	State league/national league									Copa do Brasil	Continental competitions		Other competitions	
Season	Division	Pos	P	W	D	L	GF	GA	Pts	Copa do Brasil	Competition	Result	Competition	Result
1915	Mineiro	1st	8	6	1	1	21	5	13	—	—	—	—	—
1916	Mineiro	2nd	8	3	3	2	8	9	9	—	—	—	—	—
1917	Mineiro	2nd	7	3	2	2	14	7	8	—	—	—	—	—
1918	Mineiro	2nd	7	5	1	1	16	3	11	—	—	—	—	—
1919	Mineiro	3rd	5	1	1	3	7	8	3	—	—	—	—	—
1920	Mineiro	4th	10	3	4	3	16	15	10	—	—	—	—	—
1921	Mineiro	2nd	12	5	6	1	27	18	16	—	—	—	—	—
1922	Mineiro	4th	11	4	3	4	25	20	11	—	—	—	—	—
1923	Mineiro	2nd	6	3	3	0	10	5	9	—	—	—	—	—
1924	— (Note: Atlético Mineiro did not enter the 1924 Campeonato Mineiro.)	—								—	—	—	—	—
1925	Mineiro	— (Note: The 1925 Campeonato Mineiro was interrupted due to the Campeonato Brasileiro de Seleções Estaduais and not restarted.)								—	—	—	—	—
1926	Mineiro	1st	10	8	1	1	37	17	17	—	—	—	—	—
1927	Mineiro	1st	12	10	1	1	56	14	21	—	—	—	—	—
1928	Mineiro	2nd	16	12	3	1	60	24	27	—	—	—	—	—
1929	Mineiro	2nd	14	11	0	3	80	17	22	—	—	—	—	—
1930	Mineiro	— (Note: Atlético withdrew from the 1930 Campeonato Mineiro during the competition.)								—	—	—	—	—
1931	Mineiro	1st	8	7	0	1	34	10	14	—	—	—	—	—
1932	Mineiro (Note: In 1932, several clubs left LMDT (Liga Mineira de Desportos Terrestres), protesting against alleged partiality in favour of Atlético and created a new league, the AMEG (Associação Mineira de Esportes Geraes). Atlético was the only "big" club to remain in LMDT. The champions of both leagues are considered in the Federação Mineira de Futebol records.)	1st	14	12	2	0	48	12	26	—	—	—	—	—
1933	Mineiro	4th	15	7	2	6	29	29	16	—	—	—	—	—
1934	Mineiro	2nd	12	8	2	2	25	11	18	—	—	—	—	—
1935	Mineiro	2nd	10	6	0	4	29	16	12	—	—	—	—	—
1936	Mineiro	1st	6	5	1	0	33	6	11	—	—	—	—	—
1937	Mineiro	4th	10	4	2	4	15	12	11	—	—	—	Copa dos Campeões Estaduais	W
1938	Mineiro	1st	15	14	1	0	42	6	29	—	—	—	—	—
1939	Mineiro	1st	15	11	1	3	24	11	23	—	—	—	—	—
1940	Mineiro	2nd	7	4	3	0	21	7	11	—	—	—	—	—
1941	Mineiro	1st	19	14	1	4	53	21	29	—	—	—	—	—
1942	Mineiro	1st	10	10	0	0	30	6	20	—	—	—	—	—
1943	Mineiro	2nd	10	6	3	1	21	8	15	—	—	—	—	—
1944	Mineiro	2nd	15	9	2	4	33	17	20	—	—	—	—	—
1945	Mineiro	4th	18	8	0	10	40	34	16	—	—	—	—	—
1946	Mineiro	1st	18	4	3	1	49	19	31	—	—	—	—	—
1947	Mineiro	1st	12	10	1	1	33	10	21	—	—	—	—	—
1948	Mineiro	2nd	18	13	2	3	50	20	28	—	—	—	—	—
1949	Mineiro	1st	18	14	2	2	50	23	30	—	—	—	—	—
1950	Mineiro	1st	12	9	0	3	46	23	18	—	—	—	—	—
1951	Mineiro	2nd	14	9	1	4	44	18	19	—	—	—	—	—
1952	Mineiro	1st	16	15	0	1	40	8	30	—	—	—	—	—
1953	Mineiro	1st	9	6	2	1	15	7	14	—	—	—	—	—
1954	Mineiro	1st	25	18	3	2	45	19	39	—	—	—	—	—
1955	Mineiro	1st	27	16	7	4	55	32	39	—	—	—	—	—
1956	Mineiro	1st	24	14	4	6	42	24	32	—	—	—	—	—
1957	Mineiro	3rd	9	6	1	2	17	10	13	—	—	—	—	—
1958	Mineiro	1st	31	19	4	6	65	35	44	—	—	—	—	—
1959	Taça Brasil	6th	4	1	1	2	5	8	3	—	—	—	—	—
1959	Mineiro	5th	20	11	1	8	48	34	23	—	—	—	—	—
1960	Taça Brasil	—								—	—	—	—	—
1960	Mineiro	5th	30	16	5	9	55	35	37	—	—	—	—	—
1961	Taça Brasil	—								—	—	—	—	—
1961	Mineiro	3rd	26	16	3	7	49	30	35	—	—	—	—	—
1962	Taça Brasil	—								—	—	—	—	—
1962	Mineiro	1st	22	12	7	3	34	16	31	—	—	—	—	—
1963	Taça Brasil	6th	4	1	2	1	4	4	4	—	—	—	—	—
1963	Mineiro	1st	22	14	7	1	30	12	35	—	—	—	—	—
1964	Taça Brasil	5th	6	3	1	2	7	11	7	—	—	—	—	—
1964	Mineiro	5th	22	11	7	4	30	19	29	—	—	—	—	—
1965	Taça Brasil	—								—	—	—	—	—
1965	Mineiro	4th	22	10	5	7	44	27	25	—	—	—	—	
1966	Taça Brasil	—								—	—	—	—	—
1966	Mineiro	2nd	22	15	6	1	36	15	36	—	—	—	—	—
1967	Taça Brasil	5th	8	4	2	2	15	11	10	—	—	—	—	—
1967	Robertão	8th	14	5	4	5	18	21	14	—	—	—	—	—
1967	Mineiro	2nd	22	15	5	2	45	16	35	—	—	—	—	—
1968	Taça Brasil	—								—	—	—	—	—
1968	Robertão	7th	16	7	5	4	18	15	19	—	—	—	—	—
1968	Mineiro	2nd	22	15	5	2	45	17	35	—	—	—	—	—
1969	Robertão	6th	16	8	1	7	31	23	17	—	—	—	—	—
1969	Mineiro	2nd	30	22	4	4	68	18	48	—	—	—	—	—
1970	Robertão	3rd	19	7	8	4	23	18	22	—	—	—	—	—
1970	Mineiro	1st	22	20	1	1	51	12	41	—	—	—	—	—
1971	Série A	1st	27	12	10	5	39	22	34	—	—	—	Torneio do Povo	3rd
1971	Mineiro	3rd	22	13	4	5	25	14	30	—	—	—	Torneio do Povo	3rd
1972	Série A	11th	28	11	8	9	35	29	30	—	Copa Libertadores	GS	Torneio do Povo	2nd
1972	Mineiro	2nd	25	13	11	1	44	16	37	—	Copa Libertadores	GS	Torneio do Povo	2nd
1973	Série A	11th	37	14	13	10	43	35	41	—	—	—	Torneio do Povo	6th
1973	Mineiro	3rd	24	11	8	5	37	15	30	—	—	—	Torneio do Povo	6th
1974	Série A	7th	24	13	5	6	41	26	31	—	—	—	—	—
1974	Mineiro	2nd	27	20	3	4	58	15	43	—	—	—	—	—
1975	Série A	19th	20	6	9	5	24	24	24	—	—	—	—	—
1975	Mineiro	2nd	21	13	4	4	35	13	31	—	—	—	—	—
1976	Série A	3rd	22	11	7	4	40	18	36	—	—	—	—	—
1976	Mineiro	1st	28	24	4	0	77	6	52	—	—	—	—	—
1977	Série A	2nd	21	17	4	0	55	16	49	—	—	—	—	—
1977	Mineiro	2nd	25	17	5	3	55	16	39	—	—	—	—	—
1978	Série A	34th	20	8	8	4	24	12	27	—	Copa Libertadores	SF	Copa dos Campeões Brasileiros	W
1978	Mineiro	1st	28	19	6	3	46	12	44	—	Copa Libertadores	SF	Copa dos Campeões Brasileiros	W
1979	Série A	10th	19	6	10	3	18	11	22	—	—	—	—	—
1979	Mineiro	1st	43	28	9	6	82	23	66	—	—	—	—	—
1980	Série A	2nd	22	15	4	3	46	16	34	—	—	—	—	—
1980	Mineiro	1st	20	18	1	1	55	8	37	—	—	—	—	—
1981	Série A	14th	17	5	7	5	22	15	17	—	Copa Libertadores	GS	—	—
1981	Mineiro	1st	32	19	8	5	50	20	46	—	Copa Libertadores	GS	—	—
1982	Série A	19th	14	5	4	5	20	15	14	—	—	—	—	—
1982	Mineiro	1st	36	23	5	8	59	24	51	—	—	—	—	—
1983	Série A	3rd	24	14	7	3	41	18	35	—	—	—	—	—
1983	Mineiro	1st	36	23	9	5	69	24	56	—	—	—	—	—
1984	Série A	19th	14	7	3	4	24	12	17	—	—	—	—	—
1984	Mineiro	2nd	30	17	6	7	43	19	40	—	—	—	—	—
1985	Série A	4th	28	13	9	6	37	23	35	—	—	—	—	—
1985	Mineiro	1st	41	16	21	4	52	29	60	—	—	—	—	—
1986	Série A	3rd	32	17	11	4	39	20	45	—	—	—	—	—
1986	Mineiro	1st	30	21	7	2	69	15	49	—	—	—	—	—
1987	Módulo Verde (Série A)	3rd	17	10	5	2	23	9	25	—	—	—	—	—
1987	Mineiro	2nd	32	13	13	6	47	27	38	—	—	—	—	—
1988	Série A	10th	23	8	10	5	22	22	40	—	—	—	—	—
1988	Mineiro	1st	30	21	6	3	52	14	48	—	—	—	—	—
1989	Série A	8th	18	6	7	5	21	13	19	QF	—	—	—	—
1989	Mineiro	1st	30	24	2	4	77	14	50	QF	—	—	—	—
1990	Série A	5th	21	7	10	4	20	18	24	QF	—	—	—	—
1990	Mineiro	2nd	35	25	5	5	71	21	55	QF	—	—	—	—
1991	Série A	3rd	21	8	10	3	29	20	26	R16	—	—	—	—
1991	Mineiro	1st	24	13	9	2	37	9	35	R16	—	—	—	—
1992	Série A	13th	19	6	6	7	15	18	18	R16	Copa CONMEBOL	W	—	—
1992	Mineiro	3rd	24	15	6	3	39	15	36	R16	Copa CONMEBOL	W	—	—
1993	Série A	20th	14	1	2	11	7	21	4	—	Copa CONMEBOL	SF	—	—
1993	Série A	20th	14	1	2	11	7	21	4	—	Copa de Oro	RU	—	—
1993	Mineiro	2nd	17	10	3	4	31	16	23	—	Copa de Oro	RU	—	—
1994	Série A	4th	28	11	8	9	36	28	30	QF	—	—	—	—
1994	Mineiro	2nd	22	12	5	5	33	16	29	QF	—	—	—	—
1995	Série A	7th	23	10	7	6	32	27	37	QF	Copa CONMEBOL	RU	—	—
1995	Mineiro	1st	22	16	3	3	52	19	51	QF	Copa CONMEBOL	RU	—	—
1996	Série A	3rd	27	13	4	10	44	37	43	R16	Copa Master de CONMEBOL	RU	—	—
1996	Mineiro	2nd	34	31	9	4	73	24	73	R16	Copa Master de CONMEBOL	RU	—	—
1997	Série A	4th	31	16	5	12	48	42	47	R16	Copa CONMEBOL	W	—	—
1997	Mineiro	5th	24	13	8	3	39	25	47	R16	Copa CONMEBOL	W	—	—
1998	Série A	9th	23	9	9	5	38	33	36	R16	Copa CONMEBOL	SF	—	—
1998	Mineiro	2nd	22	13	4	5	44	29	43	R16	Copa CONMEBOL	SF	—	—
1999	Série A	2nd	29	15	4	10	56	42	49	R2	—	—	Copa Centro-Oeste	SF
1999	Mineiro	1st	17	9	5	3	34	16	32	R2	—	—	Copa Centro-Oeste	SF
2000	Módulo Azul (Série A)	24th	24	7	6	11	31	42	27	SF	Copa Libertadores	QF	Copa Sul-Minas	GS
2000	Módulo Azul (Série A)	24th	24	7	6	11	31	42	27	SF	Copa Mercosur	SF	Copa Sul-Minas	GS
2000	Mineiro	1st	16	11	3	2	36	22	36	SF	Copa Mercosur	SF	Copa Sul-Minas	GS
2001	Série A	4th	29	16	4	9	54	36	52	R2	—	—	Copa Sul-Minas	SF
2001	Mineiro	2nd	19	10	4	5	33	21	34	R2	—	—	Copa Sul-Minas	SF
2002	Série A	8th	27	12	4	11	52	51	40	SF	—	—	Copa Sul-Minas	SF
2002	Super Mineiro (Note: In 2002, Minas Gerais's clubs that took part in the Copa Sul-Minas, the regional cup, did not participate in the regular season of the state league. Atlético, Cruzeiro, América and Mamoré were joined by Campeonato Mineiro champion Caldense in the Supercampeonato Mineiro.)	4th	4	1	1	2	6	7	4	SF	—	—	Copa Sul-Minas	SF
2003	Série A	7th	46	19	15	12	76	62	72	QF	Copa Sudamericana	R1	—	—
2003	Mineiro	2nd	12	7	4	1	27	15	25	QF	Copa Sudamericana	R1	—	—
2004	Série A	19th	46	12	17	17	60	66	53	R2	Copa Sudamericana	R1	—	—
2004	Mineiro	2nd	17	11	4	2	36	17	37	R2	Copa Sudamericana	R1	—	—
2005	Série A ↓	20th	42	13	8	21	54	59	47	QF	—	—	—	—
2005	Mineiro	3rd	11	6	2	5	24	15	20	QF	—	—	—	—
2006	Série B ↑	1st	38	20	11	7	70	39	71	QF	—	—	—	—
2006	Mineiro	3rd	13	6	5	2	19	15	23	QF	—	—	—	—
2007	Série A	8th	38	15	10	13	63	51	55	QF	—	—	—	—
2007	Mineiro	1st	15	8	3	4	25	13	27	QF	—	—	—	—
2008	Série A	12th	38	12	12	14	50	61	48	QF	Copa Sudamericana	R1	—	—
2008	Mineiro	2nd	15	8	1	6	22	15	25	QF	Copa Sudamericana	R1	—	—
2009	Série A	7th	38	16	8	14	55	56	54	R16	Copa Sudamericana	R1	—	—
2009	Mineiro	2nd	17	12	3	2	36	14	39	R16	Copa Sudamericana	R1	—	—
2010	Série A	13th	38	13	6	19	52	64	45	QF	Copa Sudamericana	QF	—	—
2010	Mineiro	1st	17	9	7	1	41	22	34	QF	Copa Sudamericana	QF	—	—
2011	Série A	15th	38	13	6	19	50	60	45	R2	Copa Sudamericana	R1	—	—
2011	Mineiro	2nd	15	11	2	2	39	20	35	R2	Copa Sudamericana	R1	—	—
2012	Série A	2nd	38	20	12	6	64	37	72	R16	—	—	—	—
2012	Mineiro	1st	15	11	4	0	32	9	37	R16	—	—	—	—
2013	Série A	8th	38	15	12	11	49	38	57	R16	Copa Libertadores	W	FIFA Club World Cup	3rd
2013	Mineiro	1st	15	12	0	3	41	14	36	R16	Copa Libertadores	W	FIFA Club World Cup	3rd
2014	Série A	5th	38	17	11	10	51	38	61	W	Copa Libertadores	R16	—	—
2014	Mineiro	2nd	15	8	5	2	25	10	29	W	Recopa Sudamericana	W	—	—
2015	Série A	2nd	38	21	6	11	65	47	69	R16	Copa Libertadores	R16	—	—
2015	Mineiro	1st	15	9	3	3	25	10	30	R16	Copa Libertadores	R16	—	—
2016	Série A	4th	38	17	11	10	61	53	62	RU	Copa Libertadores	QF	Primeira Liga	GS
2016	Mineiro	2nd	15	7	4	4	31	16	25	RU	Copa Libertadores	QF	Primeira Liga	GS
2017	Série A	9th	38	14	12	12	52	49	54	QF	Copa Libertadores	R16	Primeira Liga	RU
2017	Mineiro	1st	11	9	0	2	26	9	27	QF	Copa Libertadores	R16	Primeira Liga	RU
2018	Série A	6th	38	17	8	13	56	43	59	R16	Copa Sudamericana	R1	—	—
2018	Mineiro	RU	11	5	3	3	14	7	18	R16	Copa Sudamericana	R1	—	—
2019	Série A	13th	38	13	9	16	45	49	48	QF	Copa Libertadores	GS	—	—
2019	Mineiro	RU	11	9	1	1	24	6	28	QF	Copa Sudamericana	SF	—	—
2020	Série A	3rd	38	20	8	10	64	45	68	R2	Copa Sudamericana	R1	—	—
2020	Mineiro	1st	15	10	4	1	28	9	34	R2	Copa Sudamericana	R1	—	—
2021	Série A	1st	38	26	6	6	67	34	84	W	Copa Libertadores	SF	—	—
2021	Mineiro	1st	15	10	3	2	27	8	33	W	Copa Libertadores	SF	—	—
2022	Série A	7th	38	15	13	10	45	37	58	R16	Copa Libertadores	QF	Supercopa do Brasil	W
2022	Mineiro	1st	14	12	1	1	31	6	37	R16	Copa Libertadores	QF	Supercopa do Brasil	W
2023	Série A	3rd	38	19	9	10	52	32	66	R16	Copa Libertadores	R16	—	—
2023	Mineiro	1st	12	9	2	1	21	8	29	R16	Copa Libertadores	R16	—	—
2024	Série A	12th	38	11	14	13	47	54	47	RU	Copa Libertadores	RU	—	—
2024	Mineiro	1st	12	6	3	3	22	11	21	RU	Copa Libertadores	RU	—	—
2025	Série A	11th	38	12	12	14	43	44	48	QF	Copa Sudamericana	RU	—	—
2025	Mineiro	1st	12	7	4	1	17	3	25	QF	Copa Sudamericana	RU	—	—
2026	Série A	TBD								SF	Copa Sudamericana	F	—	—
2026	Mineiro	RU	11	3	7	1	17	10	16	SF	Copa Sudamericana	F	—	—
