= Tomás Cuello =

Argentine footballer

Personal information
- Full name: Tomás Esteban Cuello
- Date of birth: 5 March 2000 (age 26)
- Place of birth: San Miguel de Tucumán, Argentina
- Height: 1.76 m (5 ft 9 1/2 in)
- Position: Winger

Team information
- Current team: Mineiro
- Number: 28

Youth career
- 2016–2018: Tucumán
- 2017: → Sampdoria (loan)

Senior career*
Years	Team	Apps	(Gls)
2017–2022	Tucumán	14	(0)
2020–2021	→ Bragantino (loan)	59	(3)
2022–2025	Paranaense	122	(7)
2025–	Mineiro	43	(11)
- * Club domestic league appearances and goals as of 7 April 2026

Tomás Esteban Cuello (born 5 March 2000) is an Argentine professional footballer who plays as a wide midfielder for Atlético Mineiro.

== Club career ==
=== Atlético Tucumán ===
Cuello appeared on the bench for Atlético Tucumán for the first time in a Copa Libertadores match against Jorge Wilstermann on 11 April 2017. He made his professional debut five days later on 16 April in an Argentine Primera División game versus San Lorenzo. By doing so, he became the first player born in the 2000s to play in Argentina's top-flight. Cuello made 20 appearances for the team from 2017 to 2020.

==== Red Bull Bragantino (loan) ====
Cuello departed on loan to Red Bull Bragantino in February 2020. He made his debut during a 1–1 draw at the Maracanã against Flamengo on 15 October 2020. Cuello scored his first senior goal in a Copa do Brasil first round 3–2 victory away to Mirassol, netting a stoppage time winner at the Estádio Kléber Andrade on 18 March 2021.

=== Athletico Paranaense ===
On 24 February 2022, Cuello signed a four-year contract with Athletico Paranaense. He completed the milestone of a hundred appearances for the club on 25 November 2023, in a 0–0 league draw with Vasco da Gama. In 2023, Cuello made 55 appearances, 33 of which as a starter; he scored two goals and contributed eight assists, playing as a winger in a slightly more defensive role in a formation with three defenders.

=== Atlético Mineiro ===
On 30 January 2025, Cuello joined Atlético Mineiro on a four-year deal.

== International career ==
In February 2017, Cuello was called up by the Argentina U17s for their pre-2017 South American Under-17 Football Championship training camp. He was selected for U20 training in September and October 2017. In February 2018, Cuello was called up to train with the U19 team.

== Career statistics ==
As of 15 December 2025.

Club statistics
Club	Season	League			National Cup		League Cup		Continental		State League		Other		Total	
Club	Season	Division	Apps	Goals	Apps	Goals	Apps	Goals	Apps	Goals	Apps	Goals	Apps	Goals	Apps	Goals
Atlético Tucumán	2016–17	Primera División	4	0	0	0	—		1 (Note: Appearance(s) in Copa Libertadores)	0	—		—		5	0
Atlético Tucumán	2017–18	Primera División	1	0	0	0	—		2 (Note: Appearance(s) in Copa Sudamericana)	0	—		—		3	0
Atlético Tucumán	2018–19	Primera División	4	0	2	0	0	0	—		—		—		6	0
Atlético Tucumán	2019–20	Primera División	5	0	1	0	—		0	0	—		—		6	0
Atlético Tucumán	Total		14	0	3	0	0	0	3	0	—		—		20	0
Red Bull Bragantino (loan)	2020	Série A	18	0	2	0	—		—		—		—		20	0
Red Bull Bragantino (loan)	2021	Série A	30	3	3	1	—		13	3	11 (Note: Appearance(s) in Campeonato Paulista)	0	—		57	7
Red Bull Bragantino (loan)	Total		48	3	5	1	—		13	3	11	0	—		77	7
Athletico Paranaense	2022	Série A	31	2	6	0	—		10	1	—		—		47	3
Athletico Paranaense	2023	Série A	32	0	5	0	—		4	0	14 (Note: Appearance(s) in Campeonato Paranaense)	2	—		55	2
Athletico Paranaense	2024	Série A	32	3	5	1	—		12	1	12	0	—		61	5
Athletico Paranaense	2025	Série B	—		—		—		—		1	0	—		1	0
Athletico Paranaense	Total		95	5	16	1	—		26	2	27	2	—		164	10
Atlético Mineiro	2025	Série A	16	1	8	2	—		9	2	8 (Note: Appearance(s) in Campeonato Mineiro)	1	—		41	6
Career total			173	9	32	4	0	0	51	7	46	3	0	0	302	23

== Honours ==
Athletico Paranaense

- Campeonato Paranaense: 2023, 2024

Atlético Mineiro

- Campeonato Mineiro: 2025

Individual

- Campeonato Mineiro Team of the Year: 2025
