= Luiz Filipe (footballer, born 2001) =

Brazilian footballer

Personal information
- Full name: Luiz Filipe dos Reis Silva
- Date of birth: 28 May 2001 (age 25)
- Place of birth: Carmésia, Brazil
- Height: 1.75 m (5 ft 9 in)
- Position: Forward

Team information
- Current team: Mirassol
- Number: 13

Youth career
- –2017: Villa Nova
- 2017–2022: Atlético Mineiro

Senior career*
Years	Team	Apps	(Gls)
2020–2025	Atlético Mineiro	5	(0)
2022–2023	→ Goiás (loan)	2	(0)
2023–2024	→ São Bernardo (loan)	25	(6)
2025–	Mirassol	1	(0)
2025	→ Athletic (MG) (loan)	5	(0)
- * Club domestic league appearances and goals as of 18 December 2025

Luiz Filipe dos Reis Silva (born 28 May 2001), commonly known as Luiz Filipe, is a Brazilian professional footballer who plays as a forward for Mirassol.

== Club career ==
Born in Carmésia, Luiz Filipe began his career at Atlético Mineiro and made his professional debut for the club on 26 June 2021, after coming on in the 69th minute for Keno in their 2–0 loss to Santos in the Campeonato Brasileiro Série A.

On 4 April 2022, Luiz Filipe joined Goiás on loan for the remainder of the season.

== Career statistics ==
As of 16 March 2025.

Club	Season	League			Cup		Continental		Other		Total	
Club	Season	Division	Apps	Goals	Apps	Goals	Apps	Goals	Apps	Goals	Apps	Goals
Atlético Mineiro	2021	Série A	2	0	0	0	0	0	0	0	2	0
Atlético Mineiro	2022	Série A	—		—		—		0	0	0	0
Atlético Mineiro	2025	Série A	—		0	0	—		3 (Note: Appearances in Campeonato Mineiro)	0	3	0
Atlético Mineiro	Total		2	0	0	0	0	0	3	0	5	0
Goiás (loan)	2022	Série A	2	0	0	0	—		0	0	2	0
Goiás (loan)	2023	Série A	0	0	0	0	0	0	0	0	0	0
Goiás (loan)	Total		2	0	0	0	0	0	0	0	2	0
São Bernardo (loan)	2023	Série C	6	0	—		—		—		6	0
São Bernardo (loan)	2024	Série C	14	6	2	0	—		5 (Note: Appearances in Campeonato Paulista)	0	21	6
São Bernardo (loan)	Total		20	6	2	0	—		5	0	27	6
Career total			24	6	2	0	0	0	8	0	34	6

== Honours ==
Atlético Mineiro

- Campeonato Brasileiro Série A: 2021
- Copa do Brasil: 2021
- Campeonato Mineiro: 2021, 2022, 2025
- Supercopa do Brasil: 2022
- Campeonato Brasileiro Sub-20: 2020
