= Cadu (footballer, born 2004) =

Brazilian footballer

Personal information
- Full name: Carlos Eduardo Amaral Pereira de Castro
- Date of birth: 24 May 2004 (age 22)
- Place of birth: Divinópolis, Brazil
- Height: 1.79 m (5 ft 10 in)
- Position: Forward

Team information
- Current team: Goiás (on loan from Atlético Mineiro)
- Number: 18

Youth career
- Flamengo de Divinópolis
- 2018–2023: Atlético Mineiro

Senior career*
| Years | Team | Apps | (Gls) |
| 2023– | Atlético Mineiro | 27 | (4) |
| 2026– | → Goiás (loan) | 34 | (3) |
- * Club domestic league appearances and goals as of 16 November 2026

Carlos Eduardo Amaral Pereira de Castro (born 24 May 2004), commonly known as Cadu, is a Brazilian footballer who plays as a forward for Goiás, on loan from Atlético Mineiro.

== Club career ==
Cadu was born in Divinópolis, Minas Gerais, and joined Atlético Mineiro's youth categories in 2018, from hometown side Flamengo EC. In April 2023, he extended his contract with Galo.

Cadu made his first team debut on 3 May 2023, coming on as a late substitute for Matías Zaracho in a 2–0 home win over Alianza Lima, for the year's Copa Libertadores. His first Série A appearance occurred seventeen days later, as he replaced Edenílson in a 2–1 away win over Coritiba.

On 10 February 2026, Cadu joined Goiás on a season-long loan.

== Career statistics ==
As of 14 January 2026

| Club | Season | League | | | State League | | Cup | | Continental | | Other | | Total | |
| Club | Season | Division | Apps | Goals | Apps | Goals | Apps | Goals | Apps | Goals | Apps | Goals | Apps | Goals |
|---|---|---|---|---|---|---|---|---|---|---|---|---|---|---|
| Atlético Mineiro | 2023 | Série A | 2 | 0 | 0 | 0 | 0 | 0 | 1 (Note: Appearance(s) in Copa Libertadores) | 0 | — | | 3 | 0 |
| Atlético Mineiro | 2024 | Série A | 20 | 3 | 2 | 1 | 5 | 0 | 5 | 0 | — | | 32 | 4 |
| Atlético Mineiro | 2025 | Série A | 1 | 0 | 0 | 0 | 0 | 0 | 0 | 0 | — | | 1 | 0 |
| Atlético Mineiro | 2026 | Série A | 0 | 0 | 2 | 0 | — | | — | | — | | 2 | 0 |
| Career total | | | 23 | 3 | 4 | 1 | 5 | 0 | 6 | 0 | 0 | 0 | 38 | 4 |

== Honours ==
Atlético Mineiro

- Campeonato Mineiro: 2024, 2025
