= João Marcelo =

João Marcelo may refer to:

- João Marcelo (footballer, born 2000), Brazilian centre-back
- João Marcelo (footballer, born 2005), Brazilian forward
