= Paulo Vitor (footballer, born 2004) =

Brazilian footballer

Personal information
- Full name: Paulo Vitor Monteiro
- Date of birth: 26 August 2004 (age 22)
- Place of birth: Junqueirópolis, Brazil
- Height: 1.85 m (6 ft 1 in)
- Positions: Defensive midfielder; centre back

Team information
- Current team: Avaí (on loan from Atlético Mineiro)
- Number: 25

Youth career
- 2021: Comercial Tietê
- 2022–2023: Boston City Brasil
- 2023: → Atlético Mineiro (loan)

Senior career*
Years	Team	Apps	(Gls)
2022–2023	Boston City Brasil	1	(0)
2023	→ Atlético Mineiro (loan)	1	(0)
2024–	Atlético Mineiro	17	(0)
2025	→ Criciúma (loan)	1	(0)
2026–	→ Avaí (loan)	34	(2)
- * Club domestic league appearances and goals as of 18 November 2026

Paulo Vitor Monteiro (born 26 August 2004), known as Paulo Vitor or Paulinho, is a Brazilian footballer who plays as a defensive midfielder or a central defender for Avaí, on loan from Atlético Mineiro.

== Club career ==
Born in Junqueirópolis, São Paulo, Paulo Vitor began his career with local side Comercial FC Tietê before joining Boston City Brasil for the 2022 season. He made his first team debut with the latter side on 17 September 2022, starting in a 3–1 Campeonato Mineiro Segunda Divisão home win over Juventus Minasnovense.

On 6 February 2023, Paulo Vitor was loaned to Atlético Mineiro for two years, being initially assigned to the under-20 squad. He made his professional – and Série A – debut on 10 May, coming on as a second-half substitute for Rodrigo Battaglia in a 4–0 away routing of Cuiabá.

On 17 November 2023, Atlético announced the purchase of 60% of Paulo Vitor's economic rights, with the player signing a permanent contract until December 2027.

On 11 February 2025, Paulo Vitor joined Criciúma on a season-long loan. He suffered a knee injury on his debut for the club, a 1–0 defeat to Hercílio Luz in the Campeonato Catarinense on 19 February, missing the remainder of the season as a result.

On 23 January 2026, Paulo Vitor joined Avaí on a season-long loan.

== Career statistics ==
As of 1 January 2026

Club	Season	League			State League		Cup		Continental		Other		Total	
Club	Season	Division	Apps	Goals	Apps	Goals	Apps	Goals	Apps	Goals	Apps	Goals	Apps	Goals
Boston City Brasil	2022	—			1	0	—		—		—		1	0
Atlético Mineiro	2023	Série A	1	0	—		0	0	0	0	—		1	0
Atlético Mineiro	2024	Série A	13	0	1	0	0	0	0	0	—		14	0
Atlético Mineiro	2025	Série A	—		3	0	—		—		—		3	0
Atlético Mineiro	Total		14	0	4	0	0	0	0	0	0	0	18	0
Criciúma	2025	Série B	0	0	1	0	0	0	—		—		1	0
Career total			14	0	6	0	0	0	0	0	0	0	20	0

== Honours ==
Atlético Mineiro

- Campeonato Mineiro: 2024
