= 2023 Clube Atlético Mineiro season =

Atlético Mineiro
2023 season
- President: Sérgio Coelho
- Head coach: Eduardo Coudet (until 11 June); Lucas Gonçalves (interim, 11 June–16 June); Luiz Felipe Scolari (since 16 June)
- Stadium: Mineirão; Arena MRV
- Série A: 3rd
- Campeonato Mineiro: Winners
- Copa do Brasil: Round of 16
- Copa Libertadores: Round of 16
- Top goalscorer: League: Paulinho (20); All: Paulinho (31)
Home colours	Away colours	Third colours

The 2023 season was the 109th season in the existence of Clube Atlético Mineiro and the 17th consecutive season in the top flight of Brazilian football. In addition to the national league, Atlético Mineiro participate in this season's editions of the Campeonato Mineiro, the Copa do Brasil and the Copa Libertadores.

== Players ==
As of 2 August 2023.

=== First team squad ===
Note: Flags indicate national team as defined under FIFA eligibility rules; some limited exceptions apply. Players may hold more than one non-FIFA nationality.

No.	Pos.	Nation	Player
1	GK	BRA	Gabriel Delfim
3	DF	BRA	Bruno Fuchs (on loan from CSKA Moscow)
4	DF	BRA	Réver (captain)
5	MF	BRA	Otávio
7	FW	BRA	Hulk
8	MF	BRA	Edenílson
9	FW	ARG	Cristian Pavón
10	FW	BRA	Paulinho
11	FW	CHI	Eduardo Vargas
13	DF	BRA	Guilherme Arana
14	FW	BRA	Alan Kardec
15	MF	ARG	Matías Zaracho
16	DF	BRA	Igor Rabello
17	MF	BRA	Igor Gomes
20	MF	BRA	Hyoran

No.	Pos.	Nation	Player
21	MF	ARG	Rodrigo Battaglia
22	GK	BRA	Everson
23	MF	ECU	Alan Franco
25	DF	BRA	Mariano
26	DF	ARG	Renzo Saravia
27	MF	BRA	Paulo Vitor (on loan from Boston City Brasil)
28	DF	URU	Mauricio Lemos
31	GK	BRA	Matheus Mendes
34	DF	BRA	Jemerson
38	MF	BRA	Pedrinho (on loan from Shakhtar Donetsk)
42	FW	BRA	Cadu
44	DF	BRA	Rubens
45	MF	BRA	Alisson
49	MF	BRA	Patrick

=== Other players with first team appearances ===
Note: Flags indicate national team as defined under FIFA eligibility rules; some limited exceptions apply. Players may hold more than one non-FIFA nationality.

No.	Pos.	Nation	Player
41	FW	BRA	Isaac
50	DF	BRA	Vitor Gabriel

== Transfers ==
=== In ===
No.	Pos	Player	Transferred from	Fee	Date	Source
3	DF	(Brazil) Bruno Fuchs	(Russia) CSKA Moscow	Loan	1 January 2023	
8	MF	(Brazil) Edenílson	Internacional	Free transfer	1 January 2023	
10	FW	(Brazil) Paulinho	(Germany) Bayer Leverkusen	Loan	1 January 2023	
20	MF	(Brazil) Hyoran	Red Bull Bragantino	Loan return	1 January 2023	
33	MF	(Brazil) Nathan	Fluminense	Loan return	1 January 2023	
23	DF	(Brazil) Paulo Henrique	Juventude	Free transfer	3 January 2023	
17	MF	(Brazil) Igor Gomes	São Paulo	Free transfer	6 January 2023	
49	MF	(Brazil) Patrick	São Paulo	€1,440,000	19 January 2023	
26	DF	(Argentina) Renzo Saravia	Unattached	Free transfer	16 February 2023	
28	DF	(Uruguay) Mauricio Lemos	(Turkey) Fenerbahçe	Free transfer	16 February 2023	
21	MF	(Argentina) Rodrigo Battaglia	(Spain) Mallorca	€800,000	1 April 2023	
10	FW	(Brazil) Paulinho	(Germany) Bayer Leverkusen	Free transfer	1 July 2023	
23	MF	(Ecuador) Alan Franco	(Argentina) Talleres	Loan return	1 July 2023	
27	MF	(Brazil) Paulo Vitor	(Brazil) Boston City Brasil	Loan purchased option	16 November 2023	

=== Out ===
No.	Pos	Player	Transferred to	Fee	Date	Source
2	DF	(Brazil) Guga	Fluminense	€1,500,000	1 January 2023	
3	DF	(Paraguay) Júnior Alonso	(Russia) Krasnodar	Loan return	1 January 2023	
11	FW	(Brazil) Keno	Fluminense	€1,000,000	1 January 2023	
26	MF	(Argentina) Nacho Fernández	(Argentina) River Plate	€1,880,000	1 January 2023	
28	FW	(Brazil) Felipe Felicio	(Estonia) FCI Levadia	Loan	1 January 2023	
32	GK	(Brazil) Rafael	São Paulo	€900,000	1 January 2023	
41	MF	(Brazil) Neto	Chapecoense	Loan	10 January 2023	
8	MF	(Brazil) Jair	Vasco da Gama	€2,670,000	13 January 2023	
27	MF	(Brazil) Calebe	Fortaleza	€1,110,000	8 February 2023	
23	DF	(Brazil) Paulo Henrique	Vasco da Gama	Loan	25 February 2023	
18	FW	(Brazil) Eduardo Sasha	Red Bull Bragantino	€925,000	31 March 2023	
19	FW	(Brazil) Ademir	Bahia	€2,300,000	1 April 2023	
33	MF	(Brazil) Nathan	Grêmio	Free transfer	10 April 2023	
40	DF	(Brazil) Nathan Silva	(Mexico) UNAM	€3,650,000	20 June 2023	
29	MF	(Brazil) Allan	Flamengo	€8,200,000	2 July 2023	
6	DF	(Brazil) Dodô	Santos	€111,700	10 July 2023	

=== Transfer summary ===
Undisclosed fees are not included in the transfer totals.

Expenditure

Total: ▼€2,240,000

Income

Total: ▲€24,246,700

Net total

Total: ▲€22,006,700

== Competitions ==
=== Overview ===
Competition	First match	Last match	Starting round	Final position	Record							
Competition	First match	Last match	Starting round	Final position	Pld	W	D	L	GF	GA	GD	Win %
Campeonato Brasileiro	15 April 2023	6 December 2023	Matchday 1	3rd	38	19	9	10	52	32	+20	50.00
Campeonato Mineiro	21 January 2023	9 April 2023	First stage	Winners	12	9	2	1	21	8	+13	75.00
Copa do Brasil	12 April 2023	31 May 2023	Third round	Round of 16	4	2	1	1	5	4	+1	50.00
Copa Libertadores	22 February 2023	9 August 2023	Second stage	Round of 16	12	5	4	3	16	8	+8	41.67
Total					66	35	16	15	94	52	+42	53.03

Source: Soccerway

=== Campeonato Mineiro ===
==== First stage ====
Pos	Team	Pld	W	D	L	GF	GA	GD	Pts	Qualification or relegation
1	Atlético Mineiro	8	6	2	0	15	5	+10	20	Knockout stage
2	Athletic Club	8	4	3	1	13	8	+5	15	Knockout stage
3	Villa Nova	8	3	1	4	8	14	−6	10	
4	Pouso Alegre	8	2	4	2	7	10	−3	10	

Source: FMF

==== Matches ====
21 January 1	Atlético Mineiro	2–1	Caldense	Belo Horizonte
16:30 UTC−3	Hulk 26' (pen.), 72' (pen.)	Report	Patrick 32'	Stadium: Independência; Attendance: 22,030; Referee: André Luis Freitas de Castro

29 January 2	Tombense	1–2	Atlético Mineiro	Muriaé
11:00 UTC−3	Alex Sandro 65'	Report	Paulinho 51'; Hulk 89'	Stadium: Estádio Soares de Azevedo; Referee: Felipe Fernandes de Lima

4 February 3	Ipatinga	0–1	Atlético Mineiro	Ipatinga
19:00 UTC−3		Report	Rubens 88'	Stadium: Estádio Municipal João Lamego Netto; Attendance: 19,459; Referee: Paulo César Zanovelli

8 February 4	Atlético Mineiro	3–0	Democrata SL	Belo Horizonte
19:15 UTC−3	Hulk 13', 35'; Paulinho 45+2'	Report		Stadium: Independência; Referee: Wanderson Alves de Sousa

13 February 5	Cruzeiro	1–1	Atlético Mineiro	Belo Horizonte
20:00 UTC−3	Bruno Rodrigues 62'	Report	Hulk 81'	Stadium: Independência; Referee: Paulo César Zanovelli

18 February 6	Atlético Mineiro	2–1	Patrocinense	Belo Horizonte
16:30 UTC−3	Vargas 24'; Hulk 90+10'	Report	Réver 32' (o.g.)	Stadium: Independência; Referee: Michael Patrick Costa Guimarães

25 February 7	Atlético Mineiro	1–1	América Mineiro	Belo Horizonte
16:30 UTC−3	Patrick 23'	Report	Ricardo Silva 45+3'	Stadium: Mineirão; Attendance: 37,180; Referee: Vinícius Gomes do Amaral

4 March 8	Democrata GV	0–3	Atlético Mineiro	Governador Valadares
16:30 UTC−3		Report	Hyoran 43'; Sasha 53'; Vargas 63'	Stadium: Mamudão; Referee: Antônio Márcio Teixeira da Silva

==== Knockout stage ====
===== Semi-finals =====
12 March First leg	Athletic Club	1–0	Atlético Mineiro	São João del Rei
16:00 UTC−3	Jonathan 45+4' (pen.)	Report		Stadium: Estádio Joaquim Portugal; Referee: Ronei Cândido Alves

18 March Second leg	Atlético Mineiro	1–0 (1–1 agg.)	Athletic Club	Belo Horizonte
16:30 UTC−3	Hulk 53'	Report		Stadium: Independência; Attendance: Felipe Fernandes de Lima; Referee: 21,760
Note: Atlético Mineiro qualified for the final due to the fact that he had the best campaign of the first stage, according to the regulation.

===== Finals =====
1 April First leg	América Mineiro	2–3	Atlético Mineiro	Belo Horizonte
16:30 UTC−3	Benítez 45+3', 51'	Report	Pavón 2'; Hyoran 34'; Hulk 90+7'	Stadium: Independência; Attendance: 7,440; Referee: Paulo César Zanovelli

9 April Second leg	Atlético Mineiro	2–0 (5–2 agg.)	América Mineiro	Belo Horizonte
16:30 UTC−3	Hulk 27' (pen.), 71'	Report		Stadium: Mineirão; Attendance: 55,989; Referee: Flávio Rodrigues de Souza

=== Copa Libertadores ===
==== Second stage ====
22 February First leg	Carabobo (Venezuela)	0–0	(Brazil) Atlético Mineiro	Caracas, Venezuela
21:30 UTC−3		Report		Stadium: Estadio Olímpico de la UCV; Attendance: 1,567; Referee: Gery Vargas (Bolivia)

1 March Second leg	Atlético Mineiro (Brazil)	3–1 (3–1 agg.)	(Venezuela) Carabobo	Belo Horizonte, Brazil
21:30 UTC−3	Hulk 16'; Paulinho 18'; Edenílson 73'	Report	Pernía 45+3'	Stadium: Mineirão; Attendance: 46,482; Referee: Diego Haro (Peru)

==== Third stage ====
8 March First leg	Millonarios (Colombia)	1–1	(Brazil) Atlético Mineiro	Bogotá, Colombia
21:30 UTC−3	Silva 42'	Report	Paulinho 66'	Stadium: Estadio El Campín; Attendance: 33,250; Referee: Piero Maza (Chile)

15 March Second leg	Atlético Mineiro (Brazil)	3–1 (4–2 agg.)	(Colombia) Millonarios	Belo Horizonte, Brazil
21:30 UTC−3	Paulinho 49', 81'; Hulk 88'	Report	Uribe 90+3'	Stadium: Mineirão; Attendance: 42,169; Referee: Fernando Rapallini (Argentina)

==== Group stage ====
Pos	Team	Pld	W	D	L	GF	GA	GD	Pts	Qualification
1	(Brazil) Athletico Paranaense	6	4	1	1	9	4	+5	13	Advance to round of 16
2	(Brazil) Atlético Mineiro	6	3	1	2	7	5	+2	10	Advance to round of 16
3	(Paraguay) Libertad	6	2	1	3	6	7	−1	7	Transfer to Copa Sudamericana
4	(Peru) Alianza Lima	6	1	1	4	3	9	−6	4	

Source: CONMEBOL
Rules for classification: 1) Points; 2) Goal difference; 3) Goals scored; 4) Away goals scored; 5) CONMEBOL ranking.

6 April 1	Atlético Mineiro (Brazil)	0–1	(Paraguay) Libertad	Belo Horizonte, Brazil
19:00 UTC−3		Report	Gómez 9'	Stadium: Mineirão; Attendance: 40,177; Referee: Yael Falcón Pérez (Argentina)

18 April 2	Athletico Paranaense (Brazil)	2–1	(Brazil) Atlético Mineiro	Curitiba, Brazil
21:00 UTC−3	Vitor Roque 7'; Terans 35' (pen.)	Report	Paulinho 70'	Stadium: Arena da Baixada; Attendance: 27,401; Referee: Pablo Echavarría (Argentina)

3 May 3	Atlético Mineiro (Brazil)	2–0	(Peru) Alianza Lima	Belo Horizonte, Brazil
21:30 UTC−3	Igor Gomes 59', 68'	Report		Stadium: Independência; Attendance: 17,563; Referee: Andrés Matonte (Uruguay)

23 May 4	Atlético Mineiro (Brazil)	2–1	(Brazil) Athletico Paranaense	Belo Horizonte, Brazil
19:00 UTC−3	Paulinho 68', 87'	Report	Alex Santana 51'	Stadium: Mineirão; Attendance: 39,683; Referee: Wilmar Roldán (Colombia)

6 June 5	Alianza Lima (Peru)	0–1	(Brazil) Atlético Mineiro	Lima, Peru
21:00 UTC−3		Report	Hulk 62'	Stadium: Estadio Alejandro Villanueva; Attendance: 23,554; Referee: Facundo Tello (Argentina)

27 June 6	Libertad (Paraguay)	1–1	(Brazil) Atlético Mineiro	Asunción, Paraguay
19:00 UTC−3	Bareiro 61'	Report	Igor Gomes 68'	Stadium: Estadio Defensores del Chaco; Referee: Fernando Rapallini (Argentina)

==== Round of 16 ====
2 August First leg	Atlético Mineiro (Brazil)	0–1	(Brazil) Palmeiras	Belo Horizonte, Brazil
21:30 UTC−3		Report	Raphael Veiga 29'	Stadium: Mineirão; Attendance: 52,587; Referee: Facundo Tello (Argentina)

9 August Second leg	Palmeiras (Brazil)	0–0 (1–0 agg.)	(Brazil) Atlético Mineiro	São Paulo, Brazil
21:30 UTC−3		Report		Stadium: Allianz Parque; Attendance: 40,527; Referee: Fernando Rapallini (Argentina)

=== Campeonato Brasileiro ===
==== Standings ====
Pos	Team	Pld	W	D	L	GF	GA	GD	Pts	Qualification or relegation
1	Palmeiras (C)	38	20	10	8	64	33	+31	70	Qualification for Copa Libertadores group stage
2	Grêmio	38	21	5	12	63	56	+7	68	Qualification for Copa Libertadores group stage
3	Atlético Mineiro	38	19	9	10	52	32	+20	66	Qualification for Copa Libertadores group stage
4	Flamengo	38	19	9	10	56	42	+14	66	Qualification for Copa Libertadores group stage
5	Botafogo	38	18	10	10	58	37	+21	64	Qualification for Copa Libertadores second stage

Source: CBF
Rules for classification: 1) points; 2) wins; 3) goal difference; 4) goals scored; 5) head-to-head results (only between two teams); 6) fewest red cards; 7) fewest yellow cards; 8) drawing of lots.
(C) Champions

==== Result by round ====
Round	1	2	3	4	5	6	7	8	9	10	11	12	13	14	15	16	17	18	19	20	21	22	23	24	25	26	27	28	29	30	31	32	33	34	35	36	37	38
Result	L	D	W	L	W	W	W	D	W	D	D	L	D	L	D	L	L	W	W	L	W	D	W	W	W	L	W	L	W	W	W	D	W	W	W	W	W	L
Position	15	16	10	16	8	6	4	4	3	4	5	10	10	12	12	13	13	10	10	11	9	9	9	9	7	9	7	7	7	6	5	5	6	5	4	3	2	3

Source: CBF
P = Postponed

==== Matches ====
15 April 1	Atlético Mineiro	1–2	Vasco	Belo Horizonte
21:00 UTC−3	Mauricio Lemos 45+5'	Report	Andrey Santos 5'; Gabriel Pec 10'	Stadium: Mineirão; Attendance: 35,056; Referee: Raphael Claus

23 April 2	Santos	0–0	Atlético Mineiro	Santos
16:00 UTC−3		Report		Stadium: Vila Belmiro; Attendance: 11,233; Referee: Bráulio da Silva Machado

29 April 3	Atlético Mineiro	2–1	Athletico Paranaense	Belo Horizonte
21:00 UTC−3	Hulk 10', 84'	Report	Vitor Roque 90+2'	Stadium: Independência; Attendance: 15,037; Referee: Ramon Abatti Abel

7 May 4	Botafogo	2–0	Atlético Mineiro	Rio de Janeiro
18:30 UTC−3	Victor Sá 30'; Matheus Nascimento 60'	Report		Stadium: Estádio Nilton Santos; Attendance: 18,218; Referee: Flávio Rodrigues de Souza

10 May 5	Cuiabá	0–4	Atlético Mineiro	Cuiabá
20:00 UTC−3		Report	Hyoran 13'; Hulk 51' (pen.); Pavón 72'; Paulinho 87'	Stadium: Arena Pantanal; Attendance: 12,029; Referee: Wilton Pereira Sampaio

13 May 6	Atlético Mineiro	2–0	Internacional	Belo Horizonte
21:00 UTC−3	Vargas 3'; Paulinho 90+5'	Report		Stadium: Mineirão; Attendance: 36,080; Referee: Raphael Claus

20 May 7	Coritiba	1–2	Atlético Mineiro	Curitiba
18:30 UTC−3	Robson 13'	Report	Chancellor 37' (o.g.); Hulk 90+1' (pen.)	Stadium: Estádio Couto Pereira; Attendance: 20,047; Referee: Rodrigo José Pereira de Lima

28 May 8	Atlético Mineiro	1–1	Palmeiras	Belo Horizonte
18:30 UTC−3	Pavón 45'	Report	Dudu 52'	Stadium: Mineirão; Attendance: 53,236; Referee: Bráulio da Silva Machado

3 June 9	Cruzeiro	0–1	Atlético Mineiro	Uberlândia
18:30 UTC−3		Report	Hulk 27'	Stadium: Estádio Parque do Sabiá; Attendance: 34,344; Referee: Sávio Pereira Sampaio

10 June 10	Atlético Mineiro	1–1	Red Bull Bragantino	Belo Horizonte
18:30 UTC−3	Paulinho 17'	Report	Sasha 35'	Stadium: Mineirão; Attendance: 28,786; Referee: Rafael Rodrigo Klein

21 June 11	Fluminense	1–1	Atlético Mineiro	Volta Redonda
21:30 UTC−3	Samuel Xavier 45+1'	Report	Guga 35' (o.g.)	Stadium: Estádio Raulino de Oliveira; Attendance: 7,788; Referee: Ramon Abatti Abel

24 June 12	Fortaleza	2–1	Atlético Mineiro	Fortaleza
18:30 UTC−3	Tomás Pochettino 54'; Tinga 62'	Report	Alan Kardec 87'	Stadium: Arena Castelão; Attendance: 27,109; Referee: Leandro Vuaden

2 July 13	Atlético Mineiro	2–2	América Mineiro	Belo Horizonte
16:00 UTC−3	Zaracho 2'; Hulk 28'	Report	Mastriani 58', 72'	Stadium: Mineirão; Attendance: 34,507; Referee: Wilton Pereira Sampaio

9 July 14	Atlético Mineiro	0–1	Corinthians	Belo Horizonte
16:00 UTC−3		Report	Róger Guedes 40'	Stadium: Mineirão; Attendance: 21,086; Referee: Rodrigo José Pereira de Lima

17 July 15	Goiás	0–0	Atlético Mineiro	Goiânia
20:00 UTC−3		Report		Stadium: Estádio da Serrinha; Attendance: 12,303; Referee: Raphael Claus

22 July 16	Grêmio	1–0	Atlético Mineiro	Porto Alegre
21:00 UTC−3	Ronald 11'	Report		Stadium: Arena do Grêmio; Attendance: 37,085; Referee: Luiz Flávio de Oliveira

29 July 17	Atlético Mineiro	1–2	Flamengo	Belo Horizonte
21:00 UTC−3	Paulinho 33'	Report	De Arrascaeta 79'; Wesley França 87'	Stadium: Independência; Attendance: 22,441; Referee: Flávio Rodrigues de Souza

6 August 18	São Paulo	0–2	Atlético Mineiro	São Paulo
16:00 UTC−3		Report	Hulk 4'; Pavón 69' (pen.)	Stadium: Morumbi; Attendance: 53,460; Referee: Rodrigo José Pereira de Lima

13 August 19	Atlético Mineiro	1–0	Bahia	Belo Horizonte
11:00 UTC−3	Paulinho 49'	Report		Stadium: Mineirão; Attendance: 29,847; Referee: Sávio Pereira Sampaio

20 August 20	Vasco	1–0	Atlético Mineiro	Rio de Janeiro
11:00 UTC−3	Serginho 5'	Report		Stadium: Maracanã; Attendance: 53,540; Referee: Bráulio da Silva Machado

27 August 21	Atlético Mineiro	2–0	Santos	Belo Horizonte
16:00 UTC−3	Paulinho 12', 67'	Report		Stadium: Arena MRV; Attendance: 29,782; Referee: Rafael Rodrigo Klein

2 September 22	Athletico Paranaense	1–1	Atlético Mineiro	Curitiba
16:00 UTC−3	Vitor Roque 78'	Report	Paulinho 6'	Stadium: Ligga Arena; Attendance: 18,009; Referee: Flávio Rodrigues de Souza

16 September 23	Atlético Mineiro	1–0	Botafogo	Belo Horizonte
21:00 UTC−3	Paulinho 81'	Report		Stadium: Arena MRV; Attendance: 31,729; Referee: Ramon Abatti Abel

23 September 24	Atlético Mineiro	1–0	Cuiabá	Belo Horizonte
21:00 UTC−3	Paulinho 42'	Report		Stadium: Arena MRV; Attendance: 36,104; Referee: Rodrigo José Pereira de Lima

30 September 25	Internacional	0–2	Atlético Mineiro	Porto Alegre
21:00 UTC−3		Report	Hulk 73'; Igor Gomes 81'	Stadium: Estádio Beira-Rio; Attendance: 23,937; Referee: Ramon Abatti Abel

7 October 26	Atlético Mineiro	1–2	Coritiba	Belo Horizonte
18:30 UTC−3	Hulk 59'	Report	Matheus Bianqui 64'; Slimani 90+1'	Stadium: Arena MRV; Attendance: 38,358; Referee: Marcelo de Lima Henrique

19 October 27	Palmeiras	0–2	Atlético Mineiro	São Paulo
19:00 UTC−3		Report	Hulk 2'; Paulinho 76'	Stadium: Allianz Parque; Attendance: 27,718; Referee: Bruno Arleu de Araújo

22 October 28	Atlético Mineiro	0–1	Cruzeiro	Belo Horizonte
16:00 UTC−3		Report	Jemerson 87' (o.g.)	Stadium: Arena MRV; Attendance: 42,058; Referee: Ramon Abatti Abel

25 October 29	Red Bull Bragantino	1–2	Atlético Mineiro	Bragança Paulista
19:00 UTC−3	Talisson 84'	Report	Hulk 36' (pen.); Igor Gomes 80'	Stadium: Estádio Nabi Abi Chedid; Attendance: 5,496; Referee: Marcelo de Lima Henrique

28 October 30	Atlético Mineiro	2–0	Fluminense	Belo Horizonte
21:00 UTC−3	Paulinho 62', 83'	Report		Stadium: Arena MRV; Attendance: 23,003; Referee: Raphael Claus

1 November 31	Atlético Mineiro	3–1	Fortaleza	Belo Horizonte
21:30 UTC−3	Paulinho 16', 56'; Hulk 61' (pen.)	Report	Lucero 44'	Stadium: Arena MRV; Attendance: 28,898; Referee: Matheus Candançan

4 November 32	América Mineiro	1–1	Atlético Mineiro	Uberlândia
19:30 UTC−3	Mastriani 66'	Report	Paulinho 80'	Stadium: Estádio Parque do Sabiá; Attendance: 5,706; Referee: Rodrigo José Pereira de Lima

9 November 33	Corinthians	1–1	Atlético Mineiro	São Paulo
19:00 UTC−3	Romero 23'	Report	Paulinho 67'	Stadium: Neo Química Arena; Attendance: 30,348; Referee: Bráulio da Silva Machado

12 November 34	Atlético Mineiro	2–1	Goiás	Belo Horizonte
18:30 UTC−3	Hulk 41' (pen.); Arana 70'	Report	Dodô 88'	Stadium: Arena MRV; Attendance: 29,173; Referee: Marcelo de Lima Henrique

26 November 35	Atlético Mineiro	3–0	Grêmio	Belo Horizonte
16:00 UTC−3	Arana 25'; Zaracho 50'; Hulk 58'	Report		Stadium: Arena MRV; Attendance: 39,337; Referee: Bráulio da Silva Machado

29 November 36	Flamengo	0–3	Atlético Mineiro	Rio de Janeiro
20:00 UTC−3		Report	Paulinho 8'; Edenílson 47'; Rubens 82'	Stadium: Maracanã; Attendance: 65,305; Referee: Ramon Abatti Abel

2 December 37	Atlético Mineiro	2–1	São Paulo	Belo Horizonte
21:00 UTC−3	Hulk 77'; Paulinho 90+4'	Report	Luciano 90+1' (pen.)	Stadium: Mineirão; Attendance: 53,856; Referee: Sávio Pereira Sampaio

6 December 38	Bahia	4–1	Atlético Mineiro	Salvador
21:30 UTC−3	Cauly 11'; Luciano Juba 45+7'; Thaciano 67'; Ademir 90+2'	Report	Paulinho 36'	Stadium: Arena Fonte Nova; Attendance: 28,019; Referee: Ramon Abatti Abel

=== Copa do Brasil ===
==== Third round ====
12 April First leg	Atlético Mineiro	2–1	Brasil de Pelotas	Belo Horizonte
21:30 UTC−3	Battaglia 66'; Hulk 86' (pen.)	Report	João Marcus 56'	Stadium: Mineirão; Attendance: 14,964; Referee: Edina Alves Batista

26 April Second leg	Brasil de Pelotas	1–1 (2–3 agg.)	Atlético Mineiro	Pelotas
19:30 UTC−3	Márcio Jonatan 17'	Report	Zaracho 88'	Stadium: Estádio Bento Freitas; Referee: Bruno Arleu de Araíjo

==== Round of 16 ====
17 May First leg	Atlético Mineiro	2–0	Corinthians	Belo Horizonte
21:30 UTC−3	Paulinho 66', 79'	Report		Stadium: Mineirão; Attendance: 48,112; Referee: Bráulio da Silva Machado

31 May Second leg	Corinthians	2–0 (2–2 agg.) (3–1 p)	Atlético Mineiro	São Paulo
21:30 UTC−3	Matheus Bidu 32'; Róger Guedes 64'	Report		Stadium: Neo Química Arena; Attendance: 38,235; Referee: Wilton Pereira Sampaio
	Penalties
	Fábio Santos (penalty scored); Yuri Alberto (penalty missed); Vera (penalty scored); Maycon (penalty scored)		Hulk (penalty missed); Edenílson (penalty missed); Paulinho (penalty scored); Battaglia (penalty missed)

== Statistics ==
=== Squad appearances and goals ===
No.	Pos	Nat	Player	Total		Brasileiro		Mineiro		Copa do Brasil		Libertadores	
No.	Pos	Nat	Player	Apps	Goals	Apps	Goals	Apps	Goals	Apps	Goals	Apps	Goals
Goalkeepers
1	GK	(Brazil) BRA	Gabriel Delfim	0	0	0	0	0	0	0	0	0	0
22	GK	(Brazil) BRA	Everson	64	0	36	0	12	0	4	0	12	0
31	GK	(Brazil) BRA	Matheus Mendes	2	0	2	0	0	0	0	0	0	0
Defenders
3	DF	(Brazil) BRA	Bruno Fuchs	23	0	13+2	0	3	0	1	0	3+1	0
4	DF	(Brazil) BRA	Réver	18	0	1+8	0	4+1	0	0+1	0	0+3	0
13	DF	(Brazil) BRA	Guilherme Arana	32	2	27+1	2	0	0	0	0	3+1	0
16	DF	(Brazil) BRA	Igor Rabello	13	0	7+4	0	0	0	0	0	2	0
25	DF	(Brazil) BRA	Mariano	38	0	17+5	0	6+1	0	3	0	4+2	0
26	DF	(Argentina) ARG	Renzo Saravia	40	0	20+6	0	2	0	1+2	0	6+3	0
28	DF	(Uruguay) URU	Mauricio Lemos	41	1	25+2	1	4	0	2	0	6+2	0
34	DF	(Brazil) BRA	Jemerson	53	0	27+5	0	7	0	3	0	11	0
44	DF	(Brazil) BRA	Rubens	39	2	14+10	1	8+1	1	1+1	0	3+1	0
50	DF	(Brazil) BRA	Vitor Gabriel	1	0	0	0	0+1	0	0	0	0	0
Midfielders
5	MF	(Brazil) BRA	Otávio	47	0	27	0	8+3	0	1	0	4+4	0
8	MF	(Brazil) BRA	Edenílson	51	2	15+13	1	4+7	0	1+2	0	6+3	1
15	MF	(Argentina) ARG	Matías Zaracho	44	3	22+5	2	3+1	0	2+2	1	7+2	0
17	MF	(Brazil) BRA	Igor Gomes	53	5	17+12	2	6+5	0	3	0	1+9	3
20	MF	(Brazil) BRA	Hyoran	35	4	12	2	6+5	2	1+2	0	3+6	0
21	MF	(Argentina) ARG	Rodrigo Battaglia	34	1	19+3	0	0+1	0	3+1	1	7	0
23	MF	(Ecuador) ECU	Alan Franco	18	0	9+9	0	0	0	0	0	0	0
27	MF	(Brazil) BRA	Paulo Vitor	1	0	0+1	0	0	0	0	0	0	0
38	MF	(Brazil) BRA	Pedrinho	34	0	6+9	0	6+5	0	1	0	4+3	0
45	MF	(Brazil) BRA	Alisson	5	0	0+5	0	0	0	0	0	0	0
49	MF	(Brazil) BRA	Patrick	45	1	2+21	0	4+4	1	3+1	0	6+4	0
Forwards
7	FW	(Brazil) BRA	Hulk	59	30	33+1	15	8+3	11	3+1	1	10	3
9	FW	(Argentina) ARG	Cristian Pavón	50	4	21+12	3	5+2	1	3+1	0	6	0
10	FW	(Brazil) BRA	Paulinho	61	31	35+1	20	7+4	2	2+1	2	11	7
11	FW	(Chile) CHI	Eduardo Vargas	31	3	4+8	1	5+4	2	2+1	0	2+5	0
14	FW	(Brazil) BRA	Alan Kardec	15	1	2+12	1	0	0	0	0	0+1	0
41	FW	(Brazil) BRA	Isaac	3	0	0+1	0	0	0	1	0	0+1	0
42	FW	(Brazil) BRA	Cadu	3	0	0+2	0	0	0	0	0	0+1	0
Players who have made an appearance this season but have left the club
6	DF	(Brazil) BRA	Dodô	15	0	1	0	4+1	0	1+2	0	6	0
18	FW	(Brazil) BRA	Eduardo Sasha	5	1	0	0	3+1	1	0	0	0+1	0
19	FW	(Brazil) BRA	Ademir	6	0	0	0	1+4	0	0	0	1	0
23	DF	(Brazil) BRA	Paulo Henrique	3	0	0	0	3	0	0	0	0	0
27	MF	(Brazil) BRA	Calebe	3	0	0	0	2+1	0	0	0	0	0
29	MF	(Brazil) BRA	Allan	8	0	0	0	4	0	0	0	4	0
33	MF	(Brazil) BRA	Nathan	2	0	0	0	1+1	0	0	0	0	0
40	DF	(Brazil) BRA	Nathan Silva	18	0	4	0	6+1	0	2	0	4+1	0
