= Everson (footballer, born 1990) =

Brazilian footballer

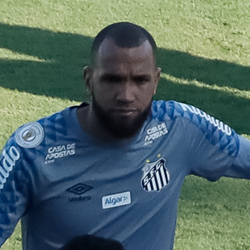
- Everson with Santos in 2019

Personal information
- Full name: Everson Felipe Marques Pires
- Date of birth: 22 July 1990 (age 36)
- Place of birth: Pindamonhangaba, Brazil
- Height: 1.93 m (6 ft 4 in)
- Position: Goalkeeper

Team information
- Current team: Atlético Mineiro
- Number: 22

Youth career
- AA Ferroviária
- 2003–2010: São Paulo

Senior career*
Years	Team	Apps	(Gls)
2010	São Paulo	0	(0)
2010	→ Guaratinguetá (loan)	3	(0)
2010–2013	Guaratinguetá	8	(0)
2014	River	14	(0)
2014–2015	Confiança	38	(1)
2015–2018	Ceará	163	(1)
2019–2020	Santos	43	(0)
2020–	Atlético Mineiro	286	(0)
- * Club domestic league appearances and goals as of 1 September 2026

Everson Felipe Marques Pires (born 22 July 1990), simply known as Everson, is a Brazilian professional footballer who plays as a goalkeeper for and captains Atlético Mineiro.

== Club career ==
=== Early career ===
Born in Pindamonhangaba, São Paulo, Everson joined São Paulo FC's youth setup in 2003, aged 13, from hometown side Associação Atlética Ferroviária. In 2010, he was loaned to Série B side Guaratinguetá until the expiration of his contract.

Everson subsequently joined Guará permanently, but spent the vast majority of his spell as a backup to Jailson and Saulo. He made his professional debut on 2 June 2010, starting in a 3–0 away loss against Ipatinga.

On 2 January 2014, Everson signed for River and became an immediate first-choice. On 12 June, he moved to Série D team Confiança, helping in the club's promotion to Série C in his first season. While at the latter club, he also scored the game's only through a penalty kick in an away success over Estanciano for the Campeonato Sergipano championship.

=== Ceará ===
On 5 August 2015, Everson signed a three-year contract with Ceará in the second division. He became a regular starter from the following campaign, being an important unit as his side achieved promotion to the Série A.

Everson made his top tier debut on 15 April 2018, starting in a 2–0 away loss against Santos. On 6 September, he scored the opener through a free kick in a 2–1 home defeat of Corinthians.

On 31 December 2018, Everson extended his contract with Vozão until 2021.

=== Santos ===
On 24 January 2019, Everson signed a four-year contract with Santos, for a rumoured fee of R$ 4 million. He made his debut for the club on 9 February, keeping a clean sheet in a 1–0 Campeonato Paulista home defeat of Mirassol.

Everson made his top tier debut for Peixe on 2 June 2019, starting in a 1–0 away defeat of former club Ceará. He ended the season as a starter, appearing in 32 league matches and overtaking longtime incumbent Vanderlei (who subsequently left for Grêmio). On 19 July 2020, he filed a legal action against the club, alleging unpaid wages, but lost at first instance two days later.

In August 2020, after having his contract maintained by the Court, Everson asked to return to the club and stated that he "regretted the action". After being reinstated by manager Cuca, however, he was demoted to fourth-choice behind João Paulo, Vladimir and John.

=== Atlético Mineiro ===
On 10 September 2020, Everson joined Atlético Mineiro on a two-year contract and a deal worth R$ 6 million. He was immediately inserted as first-choice goalkeeper, taking over the role from Rafael. Galo finished in third in the Brasileirão, with Everson keeping nine clean sheets. Before the next season started, the club won both the Campeonato Mineiro and their group in the Copa Libertadores with Everson in goal. The knockout stage tie with Argentinian giants Boca Juniors went to a penalty shootout after the second leg, and after saving two penalties, Everson took the decisive penalty as Atlético Mineiro advanced to the quarter-finals.

== International career ==
On 27 August 2021, Everson received his first call up to the Brazil national team ahead of 2022 FIFA World Cup qualifiers.

== Career statistics ==
As of match played 1 September 2026

Appearances and goals by club, season and competition
Club	Season	League			State League		Cup		Continental		Other		Total	
Club	Season	Division	Apps	Goals	Apps	Goals	Apps	Goals	Apps	Goals	Apps	Goals	Apps	Goals
Guaratinguetá	2010	Série B	2	0	1	0	—		—		—		3	0
Guaratinguetá	2011	Série B	0	0	0	0	—		—		—		0	0
Guaratinguetá	2012	Série B	3	0	2	0	—		—		—		5	0
Guaratinguetá	2013	Série B	2	0	1	0	—		—		—		3	0
Guaratinguetá	Total		7	0	4	0	—		—		—		11	0
River	2014	Série D	0	0	14	0	—		—		—		14	0
Confiança	2014	Série D	13	0	—		—		—		—		13	0
Confiança	2015	Série C	9	0	16	1	2	0	—		5 (Note: Appearance(s) in Copa do Nordeste)	0	32	1
Confiança	Total		22	0	16	1	2	0	—		5	0	45	1
Ceará	2015	Série B	11	0	—		—		—		—		11	0
Ceará	2016	Série B	37	0	13	0	5	0	—		8	0	63	0
Ceará	2017	Série B	37	0	14	0	1	0	—		3 (Note: Appearance(s) in Primeira Liga)	0	55	0
Ceará	2018	Série A	37	1	14	0	4	0	—		10	0	65	1
Ceará	Total		122	1	41	0	10	0	—		21	0	194	1
Santos	2019	Série A	32	0	2	0	7	0	0	0	—		41	0
Santos	2020	Série A	0	0	9	0	0	0	2 (Note: Appearance(s) in Copa Libertadores)	0	—		11	0
Santos	Total		32	0	11	0	7	0	2	0	—		52	0
Atlético Mineiro	2020	Série A	28	0	—		—		—		—		28	0
Atlético Mineiro	2021	Série A	37	0	9	0	10	0	12	0	—		68	0
Atlético Mineiro	2022	Série A	37	0	8	0	3	0	9	0	1 (Note: Appearance in Supercopa do Brasil)	0	58	0
Atlético Mineiro	2023	Série A	36	0	12	0	4	0	12	0	—		64	0
Atlético Mineiro	2024	Série A	25	0	12	0	9	0	13	0	—		59	0
Atlético Mineiro	2025	Série A	36	0	9	0	8	0	15 (Note: Appearance(s) in Copa Sudamericana)	0	—		68	0
Atlético Mineiro	2026	Série A	23	0	10	0	6	0	8	0	—		47	0
Atlético Mineiro	Total		222	0	60	0	40	0	69	0	1	0	392	0
Career total			405	1	146	1	59	0	71	0	27	0	708	2

== List of goals scored ==
Following, is the list with the goals scored by Everson:

#	Date	Venue	Host team	Result	Away team	Competition	Score	Type	Opponent goalkeeper
1	24 April 2015	Estádio Governador Augusto Franco, Estância	Estanciano	0–1	Confiança	Campeonato Sergipano	0–1	Penalty kick	Clézio
2	6 September 2018	Estádio Castelão, Fortaleza	Ceará	2–1	Corinthians	Campeonato Brasileiro	1–0	Free kick	Walter

== Honours ==
River

- Campeonato Piauiense: 2014

Confiança

- Campeonato Sergipano: 2015

Ceará

- Campeonato Cearense: 2017, 2018

Atlético Mineiro

- Campeonato Brasileiro Série A: 2021
- Copa do Brasil: 2021
- Campeonato Mineiro: 2021, 2022, 2023, 2024, 2025
- Supercopa do Brasil: 2022

Individual

- Bola de Prata: 2021
- Best Goalkeeper in Brazil: 2023
- Campeonato Mineiro Team of the Year: 2023, 2025
