= Lyanco =

Brazilian association football player (born 1997)

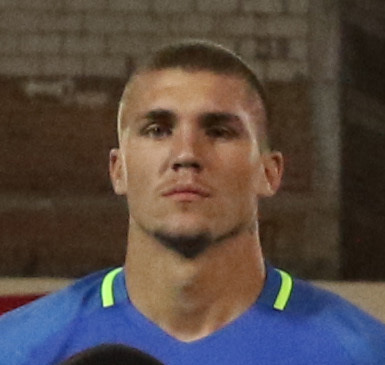
- Lyanco with Brazil U20 in 2017

Personal information
- Full name: Lyanco Evangelista Silveira Neves Vojnovic
- Date of birth: 1 February 1997 (age 29)
- Place of birth: Vitória, Espírito Santo, Brazil
- Height: 1.87 m (6 ft 2 in)
- Position: Centre-back

Team information
- Current team: Atlético Mineiro
- Number: 13

Youth career
- 2011–2014: Botafogo
- 2015–2016: São Paulo

Senior career*
Years	Team	Apps	(Gls)
2015–2017	São Paulo	21	(1)
2017–2021	Torino	46	(0)
2019	→ Bologna (loan)	13	(1)
2021–2024	Southampton	36	(1)
2023–2024	→ Al-Gharafa (loan)	13	(1)
2024–	Atlético Mineiro	52	(3)

International career
2016	Serbia U19	4	(0)
2016–2017	Brazil U20	9	(0)
2019–2020	Brazil U23	11	(0)
- * Club domestic league appearances and goals as of 09:11, 6 November 2026 (UTC)

Lyanco Evangelista Silveira Neves Vojnovic (Serbian: Лијанко Еванжелиста Силвеира Невеш Војновић, romanized: Lijanko Evanželista Silveira Neveš Vojnović, born 1 February 1997), known as Lyanco, is a Brazilian professional footballer who plays as a centre-back for Campeonato Brasileiro Série A club Clube Atlético Mineiro.

== Early life ==
Lyanco is of Portuguese and Serbian descent. His maternal family has Portuguese roots through his mother Carla. Lyanco's paternal grandfather, Jovan Vojnović, was an ethnic Serb born in the part of the Kingdom of Yugoslavia that is now in present-day Serbia and moved to Brazil at the age of seven, during World War II.

== Club career ==
=== Early career ===
Born in Vitória, Espírito Santo, Lyanco started his youth career at Botafogo.

=== São Paulo ===
In January 2015, he signed a four-year deal with São Paulo. Lyanco made his professional debut as a substitute in a 2–1 win against Atlético Paranaense. He started and played the 90 minutes in his third professional match, a 0–0 draw against Joinville.

=== Torino ===
On 29 March 2017, it was announced that Lyanco had signed a five-year contract with Serie A club Torino, for a reported fee of €6 million plus bonuses. He immediately moved to Turin to begin training with the team, and facilitate his acclimatisation to the club, at the orders of Siniša Mihajlović. His league debut came on 20 September 2017 in a 3–2 victory over Udinese Calcio.

==== Bologna (loan) ====
On 31 January 2019, Lyanco joined Bologna on loan until 30 June 2019.

=== Southampton ===
On 25 August 2021, Lyanco joined Southampton on a four-year deal for an undisclosed fee. On 21 September 2021, he made his first appearance for Southampton in the EFL Cup against Sheffield United which ended 2–2, with Southampton advancing 4–2 on penalties. On 30 October 2021, Lyanco made his first Premier League appearance, replacing Oriol Romeu in Southampton's 1–0 win against Watford at Vicarage Road. He was forced off with a hamstring injury in the first half of Southampton's FA Cup match against Coventry City on 5 February 2022, and was expected to be sidelined for up to 12 weeks. On 16 April 2022, Lyanco returned from injury and appeared in a 1–0 victory against Arsenal.

On 8 May 2023, Lyanco scored his first Premier League goal in a 4–3 defeat to Nottingham Forest. He went to Istanbul for transfer negotiations with Beşiktaş on 19 July 2023, but the transfer collapsed due to a change in the terms of the agreement proposed to Southampton.

==== Al-Gharafa (loan) ====
On 29 August 2023, Lyanco joined Al-Gharafa on a season-long loan. Three days later, he made his debut for the club in a 1–4 victory against Al Ahli. On 28 September 2023, Lyanco was given a red card for violent conduct during a 4–0 defeat to Al Sadd. He scored his first goal for the club on 11 March 2024 in a 0–2 victory against Muaither.

=== Atlético Mineiro ===
On 5 July 2024, Lyanco joined Atlético Mineiro for an undisclosed fee. In October 2025, he suffered a rupture of his left Achilles tendon and had to undergo surgery. On 8 March 2026, Lyanco was punched in a mass brawl during the Campeonato Mineiro final against Cruzeiro which led to 23 red cards being handed out, a record for a single fixture in Brazilian football.

== International career ==
On 28 January 2016, Lyanco announced on his official Twitter account that he had agreed with officials from the Football Association of Serbia, to represent Serbian youth teams at international level. He featured for Serbia U19 in the qualifiers for the U19 European Championship. Subsequently, he accepted a call up by Brazil U20 boss Rogério Micale and switched his allegiance back to Brazil.

== Personal life ==
Lyanco is married and has a daughter. In May 2024, he revealed that he suffers from anxiety and panic attacks, with manager Russell Martin praising him for opening up about his mental health struggles.

== Career statistics ==
As of match played 1 November 2026

Appearances and goals by club, season and competition
Club	Season	League			State league (Note: Includes Campeonato Paulista, Campeonato Mineiro)		National cup (Note: Includes Copa do Brasil, Coppa Italia, FA Cup, Emir of Qatar Cup)		League cup (Note: Includes EFL Cup)		Continental		Other		Total	
Club	Season	Division	Apps	Goals	Apps	Goals	Apps	Goals	Apps	Goals	Apps	Goals	Apps	Goals	Apps	Goals
São Paulo	2015	Série A	9	0	0	0	2	0	—		—		—		11	0
São Paulo	2016	Série A	12	1	0	0	1	0	—		0	0	0	0	13	1
São Paulo	2017	Série A	0	0	0	0	1	0	—		0	0	0	0	1	0
São Paulo	Total		21	1	0	0	4	0	—		0	0	0	0	25	1
Torino	2017–18	Serie A	4	0	—		2	0	—		—		—		6	0
Torino	2018–19	Serie A	2	0	—		2	0	—		—		—		4	0
Torino	2019–20	Serie A	17	0	—		1	0	—		0	0	—		18	0
Torino	2020–21	Serie A	23	0	—		2	1	—		—		—		25	1
Torino	Total		46	0	—		7	1	—		0	0	—		53	1
Bologna (loan)	2018–19	Serie A	13	1	—		0	0	—		—		—		13	1
Southampton	2021–22	Premier League	15	0	—		1	0	2	0	—		—		18	0
Southampton	2022–23	Premier League	21	1	—		3	0	6	0	—		—		30	1
Southampton	2023–24	Championship	0	0	—		0	0	1	0	—		—		1	0
Southampton	Total		36	1	—		4	0	9	0	—		—		49	1
Al-Gharafa (loan)	2023–24	Qatar Stars League	13	1	—		2	1	—		—		1 (Note: Appearance in Qatar Cup)	0	16	2
Atlético Mineiro	2024	Série A	13	0	0	0	6	0	—		5 (Note: Appearances in Copa Libertadores)	0	—		24	0
Atlético Mineiro	2025	Série A	17	0	9	2	6	1	—		10 (Note: Appearance(s) in Copa Sudamericana)	1	—		42	4
Atlético Mineiro	2026	Série A	13	1	0	0	4	0	—		9	0	—		26	1
Atlético Mineiro	Total		43	1	9	2	16	1	—		24	1	—		92	5
Career total			172	5	9	2	33	3	9	0	24	1	1	0	248	11

== Honours ==
Atlético Mineiro

- Campeonato Mineiro: 2025

São Paulo U20

- U-20 Copa Libertadores: 2016

Brazil U23

- Toulon Tournament: 2019

Individual

- Toulon Tournament Silver Ball: 2019
- Toulon Tournament Best XI: 2019
- Campeonato Mineiro Team of the Year: 2025
