= Vitinho (footballer, born November 2004) =

Brazilian footballer

Personal information
- Full name: Victor Hugo da Silva Costa
- Date of birth: 11 November 2004 (age 22)
- Place of birth: São Carlos, Brazil
- Height: 1.73 m (5 ft 8 in)
- Position: Midfielder

Youth career
- 2018–2023: Atlético Mineiro

Senior career*
Years	Team	Apps	(Gls)
2023–2025	Atlético Mineiro	2	(0)
2023–2024	→ Dnipro-1 (loan)	8	(0)
2025	→ RFS (loan)	0	(0)
2025	→ RFS II (loan)	8	(1)
- * Club domestic league appearances and goals as of 23:09, 14 March 2025 (UTC)

Victor Hugo da Silva Costa (born 11 November 2004), commonly known as Vitinho or sometimes as Victinho, is a Brazilian footballer who plays as a midfielder and is currently a free agent.

== Club career ==
Born in São Carlos, São Paulo, Vitinho joined Atlético Mineiro's youth sides in 2018, aged 14. On 20 July 2023, he was loaned to Ukrainian Premier League side Dnipro-1 for one year, with a buyout clause.

Vitinho made his senior debut on 24 September 2023, coming on as a second-half substitute for Oleksandr Pikhalyonok in a 1–0 away win over Zorya Luhansk. After seven further appearances, he left the club on 7 March 2024, due to safety reasons.

Vitinho made his Série A debut on 7 July 2024, replacing Paulinho late into a 3–0 away loss against Botafogo.

On 14 March 2025, Vitinho joined Latvian Higher League club RFS on loan until the following December.

== International career ==
Vitinho has received call-ups to Brazil at under-15 and under-17 levels.

== Career statistics ==
As of 14 March 2025

Club	Season	League			State League		Cup		Continental		Other		Total	
Club	Season	Division	Apps	Goals	Apps	Goals	Apps	Goals	Apps	Goals	Apps	Goals	Apps	Goals
Dnipro-1 (loan)	2023–24	Ukrainian Premier League	8	0	—		0	0	0	0	—		8	0
Atlético Mineiro	2024	Série A	1	0	—		0	0	0	0	—		1	0
Atlético Mineiro	2025	Série A	—		1	0	0	0	—		—		1	0
Atlético Mineiro	Total		1	0	1	0	0	0	0	0	—		2	0
RFS (loan)	2025	Latvian Higher League	0	0	—		0	0	0	0	—		0	0
RFS II (loan)	2025	Future League	8	1	—		—		—		—		8	1
Career total			17	1	1	0	0	0	0	0	0	0	18	1

== Honours ==
Atlético Mineiro

- Campeonato Mineiro: 2024
