= Isaac (footballer, born March 2004) =

Brazilian footballer

Personal information
- Full name: Isaac Aguiar Tomich
- Date of birth: 26 March 2004 (age 22)
- Place of birth: Governador Valadares, Brazil
- Height: 1.85 m (6 ft 1 in)
- Position: Forward

Team information
- Current team: Istra 1961 (on loan from Hellas Verona)
- Number: 9

Youth career
- 2018–2024: Atlético Mineiro

Senior career*
Years	Team	Apps	(Gls)
2023–2026	Atlético Mineiro	4	(0)
2024–2025	→ Nacional (loan)	27	(3)
2026–	Hellas Verona	3	(0)
2026–	→ Istra 1961 (loan)	0	(0)
- * Club domestic league appearances and goals as of 23 August 2026

Isaac Aguiar Tomich (born 26 March 2004), simply known as Isaac, is a Brazilian professional footballer who plays as a forward for Croatian Football League club Istra 1961, on loan from Serie B club Hellas Verona.

== Career ==
Born in Governador Valadares, Isaac joined the youth academy of Atlético Mineiro in 2018. On 24 April 2021, after already being involved in some trainings with the first team, he renewed his contract until 2024.

Isaac made his professional debut on 6 April 2023, coming on as a second-half substitute for Otávio in a 1–0 loss to Club Libertad at the Mineirão, for the year's Copa Libertadores. He was handed his first start six days later, in a 2–1 Copa do Brasil home win over Brasil de Pelotas.

On 6 August 2024, Isaac joined Primeira Liga club Nacional on a season-long loan.

On 7 January 2026, Isaac joined Serie A club Hellas Verona on a free transfer, signing a contract until June 2029.

== Career statistics ==
As of 13 July 2025.

Club	Season	League			State League		Cup		Continental		Other		Total	
Club	Season	Division	Apps	Goals	Apps	Goals	Apps	Goals	Apps	Goals	Apps	Goals	Apps	Goals
Atlético Mineiro	2023	Série A	1	0	0	0	1	0	1 (Note: Appearance(s) in Copa Libertadores)	0	—		3	0
Atlético Mineiro	2024	Série A	1	0	1	0	0	0	0	0	—		2	0
Atlético Mineiro	2025	Série A	1	0	—		0	0	0	0	—		1	0
Atlético Mineiro	Total		3	0	1	0	1	0	1	0	0	0	6	0
Nacional (loan)	2024–25	Primeira Liga	27	3	—		1	0	—		1 (Note: Appearance(s) in Taça da Liga)	0	29	3
Career total			30	3	1	0	2	0	1	0	1	0	35	3

== Honours ==
Atlético Mineiro

- Campeonato Mineiro: 2023, 2024
