= Braganey =

Coordinates: 24.8158°S 53.1219°W

- Municipality
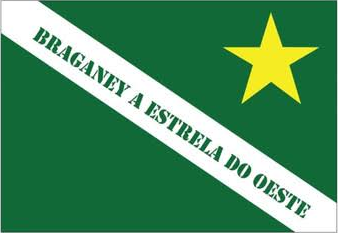
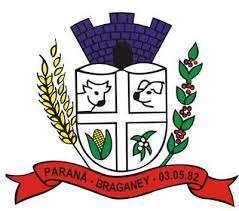
- Flag Coat of arms
- Interactive map of Braganey
- Country: Brazil
- Region: Southern
- State: Paraná
- Mesoregion: Oeste Paranaense

Population (2020)
  - Total: 5,382
- Time zone: UTC−3 (BRT)

Braganey is a municipality in the state of Paraná in the Southern Region of Brazil.

== See also ==
- List of municipalities in Paraná
