= João Marcelo (footballer, born 2005) =

Brazilian footballer

Personal information
- Full name: João Marcelo Soares de Freitas
- Date of birth: 15 April 2005 (age 21)
- Place of birth: Planura, Brazil
- Height: 1.82 m (6 ft 0 in)
- Position: Forward

Team information
- Current team: Shabab Al Ahli (on loan from Atlético Mineiro)
- Number: 79

Youth career
- Monte Azul
- Barretos
- 2022: Atlético Tubarão
- 2023–2024: Tanabi
- 2024–2025: Guarani
- 2025: Atlético Mineiro

Senior career*
Years	Team	Apps	(Gls)
2023–2024	Tanabi	5	(0)
2024–2025	Guarani	12	(4)
2025–	Atlético Mineiro	7	(0)
2026–	→ Shabab Al Ahli (loan)	0	(0)
- * Club domestic league appearances and goals as of 20:02, 2 November 2025 (UTC)

João Marcelo Soares de Freitas (born 15 April 2005), known as João Marcelo, is a Brazilian footballer who plays as a forward for UAE Pro League club Shabab Al Ahli, on loan from Atlético Mineiro.

== Career ==
=== Tanabi ===
Born in Planura, Minas Gerais, João Marcelo represented Monte Azul, Barretos and Atlético Tubarão before joining Tanabi in 2023. He made his senior debut with the latter in the year's Campeonato Paulista Segunda Divisão, featuring in five matches.

=== Guarani ===
In July 2024, João Marcelo joined Guarani and was assigned to the under-20 team. He made his debut with the main squad on 17 November, coming on as a second-half substitute for Heitor in a 2–1 Série B away loss to Brusque, as both sides were already relegated.

João Marcelo returned to the under-20s for the 2025 Copa São Paulo de Futebol Júnior, and scored five goals during the competition before being definitely promoted to the main squad. He scored his first senior goal on 26 January, netting Guarani's second in a 2–0 Campeonato Paulista home win over Noroeste.

João Marcelo finished the 2025 Campeonato Paulista with four goals in just 11 appearances for Bugre.

=== Atlético Mineiro ===
On 6 March 2025, João Marcelo joined Atlético Mineiro on a deal running until December 2029. He made his debut for the club in a Série A 2–1 loss to Grêmio on 29 March.

=== Shabab Al Ahli ===
On 5 January 2026, João Marcelo joined Emirati club Shabab Al Ahli on loan until the following December, on a deal that included a conditional obligation to buy.

== Career statistics ==
As of 2 November 2025

Club	Season	League			State League		Cup		Continental		Other		Total	
Club	Season	Division	Apps	Goals	Apps	Goals	Apps	Goals	Apps	Goals	Apps	Goals	Apps	Goals
Tanabi	2023	Paulista 2ª Divisão	—		5	0	—		—		—		5	0
Guarani	2024	Série B	1	0	—		—		—		—		1	0
Guarani	2025	Série C	—		11	4	—		—		—		11	4
Guarani	Total		1	0	11	4	—		—		—		12	4
Atlético Mineiro	2025	Série A	7	0	0	0	0	0	4 (Note: Appearance(s) in Copa Sudamericana)	0	—		11	0
Career total			8	0	16	4	0	0	4	0	0	0	28	4
