= 2025 Campeonato Mineiro =

Football championship of Minas Gerais, Brazil

Campeonato Mineiro
- Season: 2025
- Dates: 18 January – 15 March
- Champions: Atlético Mineiro
- Relegated: Aymorés; Villa Nova
- Matches: 60
- Goals: 128 (2.13 per match)
- Top goalscorer: Hulk (7 goals)

The 2025 Campeonato Mineiro (officially Campeonato Mineiro SICOOB 2025 – Módulo I for sponsorship reasons) was the 111th edition of the state championship of Minas Gerais organized by the FMF. The competition started on 18 January and ended on 15 March 2025.

Atlético Mineiro successfully defended its penta-championship and earned the 50th title in the club's history.

== Format ==
=== First stage ===
The 2025 Módulo I first stage will be played by the ten teams participating in 2024 Módulo I not relegated, in addition to the two teams promoted from 2024 Módulo II. The 12 teams are divided into three groups of four teams in the first phase; the teams will play against those clubs in the other groups. At the end of the first phase, the leaders of the 3 groups plus the best second place overall qualify for the semifinals.

=== Knockout stage ===
The knockout phase features the 4 qualified teams from the previous phase in a two-legged tie in the semi-finals and the finals, where the team with the best seed has the right to choose the order of the legs. In the event of an aggregate draw, a penalty shootout will be held.

=== Relegation ===
Another important change is in the definition of relegation. Instead of the final triangular, the two clubs with the worst overall campaigns will be automatically relegated to the 2026 Módulo II.

== Participating teams ==
Locations of the 2024 Campeonato Mineiro teams
Locations of the 2025 Campeonato Mineiro teams – city of Belo Horizonte

Team	Home city	Head coach	2024 result
América Mineiro	Belo Horizonte	William Batista	3rd
Athletic Club	São João del-Rei	Roger Silva	5th
Atlético Mineiro	Belo Horizonte	Cuca	1st
Aymorés	Ubá	Luciano Quadros	2nd (Módulo II)
Betim	Betim	Alex Nascif	1st (Módulo II)
Cruzeiro	Belo Horizonte	Fernando Diniz	2nd
Democrata-GV	Governador Valadares	Wladimir Araújo	10th
Itabirito	Itabirito	Cícero Júnior	8th
Pouso Alegre	Pouso Alegre	Igor Guerra	6th
Tombense	Tombos	Raul Cabral	4th
Uberlândia	Uberlândia	Paulo Roberto Santos	7th
Villa Nova	Nova Lima	Ricardo Drubscky	9th

== First stage ==
=== Group A ===
Pos	Team	Pld	W	D	L	GF	GA	GD	Pts	Qualification or relegation
1	Tombense	8	5	1	2	8	5	+3	16	Knockout stage
2	Atlético Mineiro	8	4	4	0	9	2	+7	16	Knockout stage
3	Betim	8	4	3	1	12	5	+7	15	
4	Uberlândia	8	2	3	3	10	10	0	9	

Source: FMF

=== Group B ===
Pos	Team	Pld	W	D	L	GF	GA	GD	Pts	Qualification or relegation
1	América Mineiro	8	3	4	1	14	5	+9	13	Knockout stage
2	Athletic Club	8	4	0	4	12	12	0	12	
3	Democrata-GV	8	3	2	3	8	9	−1	11	
4	Itabirito	8	2	2	4	7	11	−4	8	

Source: FMF

=== Group C ===
Pos	Team	Pld	W	D	L	GF	GA	GD	Pts	Qualification or relegation
1	Cruzeiro	8	3	2	3	11	9	+2	11	Knockout stage
2	Pouso Alegre	8	2	2	4	7	15	−8	8	
3	Aymorés (R)	8	1	4	3	3	5	−2	7	2026 Módulo II
4	Villa Nova (R)	8	1	1	6	4	17	−13	4	2026 Módulo II

Source: FMF
(R) Relegated

== Troféu Inconfidência ==
=== Bracket ===
Semi-finals
B2	Athletic Club	0	1	1
B3	Democrata-GV	0	0	0
A3	Betim	0	1	1 (3)
A4	Uberlândia (p)	0	1	1 (4)

Final
B2	Athletic Club	2	3	5
A4	Uberlândia	0	2	2

== Knockout stage ==
=== Bracket ===
Semi-finals
A2	Atlético Mineiro	2	2	4
A1	Tombense	0	0	0
C1	Cruzeiro	1	1	1 (2)
B1	América Mineiro	1	1	1 (4)

Final
A2	Atlético Mineiro	4	0	4
B1	América Mineiro	0	1	1

=== Semi-finals ===
==== Group F ====
15 February 2025
16:30

Atlético Mineiro	2–0	Tombense
Hulk 58', 65' (pen.)	Report

Mineirão, Belo Horizonte
Attendance: 27,342
Referee: André Luiz Skettino Policarpo Bento
22 February 2025
19:00

Tombense	0–2	Atlético Mineiro
	Report	Rony 19'; Roger Carvalho 54' (o.g.)

Arena do Jacaré, Sete Lagoas
Attendance: 16,913
Referee: Murilo Francisco Misson Júnior

Atlético Mineiro advanced to the finals.

==== Group G ====
16 February 2025
18:30

Cruzeiro	1–1	América Mineiro
Gabriel 42' (pen.)	Report	Cauan Barros 77'

Mineirão, Belo Horizonte
Attendance: 38,818
Referee: Anderson Daronco
22 February 2025
16:30

América Mineiro	1–1	Cruzeiro
Marlon 32'	Report	Lucas Romero 40'
Penalties
Fernando Elizari (penalty scored); Cauan Barros (penalty scored); Jonathas de Jesus (penalty scored); Figueiredo (penalty missed); Marlon (penalty scored)	4–2	(penalty missed) William; (penalty scored) Matheus Henrique; (penalty missed) Marlon Xavier; (penalty scored) Gabriel

Independência, Belo Horizonte
Attendance: 5,251
Referee: Wilton Pereira Sampaio

América Mineiro advanced to the finals.

=== Finals ===
8 March 2025
16:30

Atlético Mineiro	4–0	América Mineiro
Jori 8' (o.g.); Lyanco 41', 48'; Rony 64'	Report

Mineirão, Belo Horizonte
Attendance: 47,036
Referee: Vinícius Gomes do Amaral
15 March 2025
16:30

América Mineiro	1–0	Atlético Mineiro
Jonathas 77'	Report

Mineirão, Belo Horizonte
Attendance: 42,206
Referee: Davi de Oliveira Lacerda

== Top goalscorers ==
Rank	Player	Club	Goals
1	(Brazil) Hulk	Atlético Mineiro	7
2	(Brazil) Gabriel Barbosa	Cruzeiro	5
3	(Brazil) Jonathas	América Mineiro	4
3	(Brazil) Luann	Democrata-GV	4
