= 2021 Clube Atlético Mineiro season =

Atlético Mineiro
2021 season
- President: Sérgio Coelho
- Head coach: Lucas Gonçalves (interim, 28 February–4 March); Cuca (5 March–28 December)
- Stadium: Mineirão
- Série A: 1st
- Campeonato Mineiro: Winners
- Copa do Brasil: Winners
- Copa Libertadores: Semi-finals
- Top goalscorer: League: Hulk (19); All: Hulk (36)
| Home colours | Away colours | Third colours |

The 2021 season was the 107th season in the history of Clube Atlético Mineiro and the club's 15th consecutive year in the top tier of Brazilian football. In addition to competing in the Campeonato Brasileiro Série A, Atlético Mineiro also took part in the Campeonato Mineiro, the Copa do Brasil, and the Copa Libertadores.

The season is considered one of the most successful in the club’s history, as Atlético Mineiro won their second Campeonato Brasileiro, their second Copa do Brasil, and their 46th Campeonato Mineiro titles, achieving the club’s first-ever domestic treble.

== Season overview ==
February

On 25 February, Jorge Sampaoli stepped down as Atlético's manager and on the following day the club named assistant coach Lucas Gonçalves to the position on an interim basis.

On 28 February, Atlético made their season debut in a Campeonato Mineiro 3–0 win over URT. Victor made his last appearance for the club in this match, having announced his retirement the day before.

March

On 5 March, Cuca was appointed head coach of the first team.

April

On 21 April, Atlético made their debut in the Copa Libertadores, drawing 1–1 away to Deportivo La Guaira.

On 24 April, the team concluded their Campeonato Mineiro first stage campaign as leaders, with nine victories and two defeats.

May

On 22 May, Atlético were crowned the Campeonato Mineiro champions after drawing 0–0 in both legs of the final against América.

On 25 May, they beat Deportivo La Guaira 4–0 at the Mineirão, concluding their Copa Libertadores group stage run with the best overall campaign, with five wins and one draw.

On 30 May, the team made their debut in the Campeonato Brasileiro, a 2–1 home loss to Fortaleza.

June

On 2 June, Atlético debuted in the Copa do Brasil third round, beating Remo away 2–0. On 10 June, they secured a spot in the round of 16 after besting their opponents yet again, this time 2–1 at home.

July

On 20 July, following two 0–0 draws, Atlético knocked Boca Juniors out of the Libertadores round of 16 in the penalty shootouts; Everson saved two kicks as Atlético won 3–1. This was the first time a Brazilian team was able to beat Boca Juniors in the penalty shootouts of a Libertadores match, after five consecutive wins by the Argentines in previous encounters.

August

On 4 August, Atlético qualified for the Copa do Brasil quarter-finals after beating Bahia 3–2 in the aggregate score of the round of 16 clash.

On 8 August, Atlético became leaders of the league for the first time following a 2–1 away victory over Juventude.

On 11 August, the team clinched a 1–0 away win against River Plate in the first leg of the Libertadores quarter-finals. One week later, in the team's first game with an attendance since March 2020 at the Mineirão, they beat the Argentines again, this time by a 3–0 score. This marked only the second time a team knocked out both River Plate and Boca Juniors in the same edition of the competition, following Independiente del Valle in 2016.

September

On 15 September, Atlético overcame Fluminense in the Copa do Brasil quarter-finals with a 3–1 win on aggregate.

On 28 September, the team was knocked out in the semi-finals of the Copa Libertadores by Palmeiras on the away goal rule, after 0–0 away draw in the first leg and a 1–1 score at home in the second.

October

On 17 October, the team ended an 18-game unbeaten run in the league after suffering a 2–1 defeat away to Atlético Goianiense.

On 20 October, they bested Fortaleza with a 4–0 home victory in the semi-finals of the Copa do Brasil. A week later, an additional 2–1 win in the second leg secured the team a place in the final.

November

Atlético finished the month of November with six wins and a draw in the league, with ten points ahead of second placed Flamengo.

December

On 2 December, Atlético were crowned the 2021 Campeonato Brasileiro Série A champions in a thrilling contest away against Bahia: after going 2–0 down at the start of the second half, the team responded scoring three goals in an interval of five minutes, first with Hulk from a penalty kick and then with a brace from Keno. The 3–2 turnaround win secured Atlético the second national league title in the club's history, 50 years after the first win.

On 12 December, Atlético beat Athletico Paranaense 4–0 in the first leg of the Copa do Brasil final at the Mineirão. Three days later, a 2–1 win at the Arena da Baixada earned the club the second national cup trophy in its history.

== Players ==
=== First team squad ===
As of December 2021.

Note: Flags indicate national team as defined under FIFA eligibility rules; some limited exceptions apply. Players may hold more than one non-FIFA nationality.

| No. | Pos. | Nation | Player |
|---|---|---|---|
| 2 | DF | BRA | Guga |
| 3 | DF | PAR | Júnior Alonso |
| 4 | DF | BRA | Réver (Captain) |
| 6 | DF | BRA | Dodô |
| 7 | FW | BRA | Hulk |
| 8 | MF | BRA | Jair |
| 10 | FW | CHI | Eduardo Vargas |
| 11 | FW | BRA | Keno |
| 13 | DF | BRA | Guilherme Arana |
| 15 | MF | ARG | Matías Zaracho |
| 16 | DF | BRA | Igor Rabello |
| 17 | FW | VEN | Jefferson Savarino |
| 18 | FW | BRA | Eduardo Sasha |
| 19 | FW | ESP | Diego Costa |
| 20 | MF | BRA | Hyoran |
| 21 | MF | ECU | Alan Franco |

| No. | Pos. | Nation | Player |
|---|---|---|---|
| 22 | GK | BRA | Everson |
| 23 | MF | BRA | Nathan |
| 25 | DF | BRA | Mariano |
| 26 | MF | ARG | Nacho Fernández |
| 27 | MF | BRA | Calebe |
| 29 | MF | BRA | Allan |
| 30 | MF | COL | Dylan Borrero |
| 31 | GK | BRA | Matheus Mendes |
| 32 | GK | BRA | Rafael |
| 33 | FW | BRA | Sávio |
| 34 | GK | BRA | Jean |
| 37 | MF | BRA | Tchê Tchê (on loan from São Paulo) |
| 40 | DF | BRA | Nathan Silva |
| 41 | MF | BRA | Neto |
| 45 | DF | BRA | Micael |
| 48 | FW | BRA | Echaporã (on loan from Figueirense) |

=== Other players with first team appearances ===
Note: Flags indicate national team as defined under FIFA eligibility rules; some limited exceptions apply. Players may hold more than one non-FIFA nationality.

| No. | Pos. | Nation | Player |
|---|---|---|---|
| 28 | FW | BRA | Felipe Felicio |
| 43 | FW | BRA | Luiz Filipe |
| 44 | MF | BRA | Rubens |

| No. | Pos. | Nation | Player |
|---|---|---|---|
| 47 | FW | BRA | Júlio Cesar |
| — | DF | BRA | Matheus Lima |

== Transfers ==
=== In ===
| No. | Pos | Player | Transferred from | Fee | Date | Source |
|---|---|---|---|---|---|---|
| 7 | FW | (Brazil) Hulk | Unattached | Free transfer | 29 January 2021 | |
| 6 | DF | (Brazil) Dodô | Unattached | Free transfer | 5 February 2021 | |
| 26 | MF | (Argentina) Ignacio Fernández | (Argentina) River Plate | €4,900,000 | 20 February 2021 | |
| 20 | MF | (Brazil) Hyoran | Palmeiras | €1,150,000 | 23 February 2021 | |
| – | MF | (Brazil) Guilherme Castilho | Mirassol | €60,000 | 23 February 2021 | |
| 27 | MF | (Brazil) Calebe | São Paulo | €60,000 | 1 March 2021 | |
| 37 | MF | (Brazil) Tchê Tchê | São Paulo | Loan | 6 April 2021 | |
| 19 | FW | (Spain) Diego Costa | Unattached | Free transfer | 14 August 2021 | |
| Total | | | | | €6,170,000 | |

=== Loan returnees ===
| No. | Pos | Player | Returning from | Date | Source |
|---|---|---|---|---|---|
| – | MF | (Brazil) Adriano | Criciúma | 17 December 2020 | |
| – | MF | (Brazil) Alessandro Vinícius | Criciúma | 17 December 2020 | |
| – | MF | (Brazil) Ralph | Ferroviária | 23 January 2021 | |
| – | MF | (Paraguay) Ramón Martínez | Coritiba | 25 January 2021 | |
| – | GK | (Brazil) Matheus Mendes | CSA | 31 January 2021 | |
| – | DF | (Brazil) Léo Griggio | Confiança | 31 January 2021 | |
| – | DF | (Brazil) Vitor Mendes | Figueirense | 31 January 2021 | |
| – | MF | (Brazil) Yago | CSA | 31 January 2021 | |
| – | FW | (Brazil) Capixaba | Juventude | 31 January 2021 | |
| – | MF | (Brazil) Gustavo Blanco | Goiás | 28 February 2021 | |
| – | MF | (Brazil) Bruninho | Sport Recife | 28 February 2021 | |
| – | MF | (Brazil) Nathan Silva | Coritiba | 28 February 2021 | |
| – | MF | (Brazil) Daniel Penha | Corinthians | 28 February 2021 | |
| – | MF | (Brazil) José Welison | Botafogo | 30 March 2021 | |
| – | FW | (Brazil) Guilherme Santos | Coimbra | 15 April 2021 | |
| – | MF | (Uruguay) David Terans | (Uruguay) Peñarol | 20 May 2021 | |
| – | MF | (Brazil) Bruninho | Confiança | 24 May 2021 | |
| – | MF | (Brazil) Daniel Penha | Bahia | 25 May 2021 | |
| – | DF | (Brazil) Maílton | Coritiba | 31 May 2021 | |
| – | GK | (Brazil) Michael | (Portugal) Paços de Ferreira | 30 June 2021 | |
| – | MF | (Brazil) Edinho | (South Korea) Daejeon Hana Citizen | 30 June 2021 | |
| – | FW | (Brazil) Denílson | (United Arab Emirates) Al Dhafra | 30 June 2021 | |
| – | DF | (Brazil) Nathan Silva | Atlético Goianiense | 2 July 2021 | |
| – | DF | (Brazil) Iago Maidana | Sport Recife | 29 July 2021 | |
| – | MF | (Brazil) Daniel Penha | Confiança | 16 August 2021 | |
| – | DF | (Brazil) Talison | Londrina | 25 August 2021 | |
| – | MF | (Brazil) Adriano | Paraná | 3 September 2021 | |

=== Out ===
| No. | Pos | Player | Transferred to | Fee | Date | Source |
|---|---|---|---|---|---|---|
| – | MF | (Brazil) Yago | Unattached | Released | 18 February 2021 | |
| – | FW | (Brazil) Capixaba | Unattached | Released | 18 February 2021 | |
| 20 | MF | (Brazil) Hyoran | Palmeiras | Loan return | 22 February 2021 | |
| 1 | GK | (Brazil) Victor | Unattached | End of contract | 28 February 2021 | |
| 26 | MF | (Brazil) Calebe | São Paulo | Loan return | 28 February 2021 | |
| – | DF | (Brazil) Léo Griggio | Unattached | End of contract | 28 February 2021 | |
| – | MF | (Uruguay) David Terans | Athletico Paranaense | €1,100,000 | 22 May 2021 | |
| 9 | FW | (Brazil) Diego Tardelli | Unattached | End of contract | 31 May 2021 | |
| – | MF | (Brazil) Léo Sena | (Italy) Spezia | €1,250,000 | 2 June 2021 | |
| 46 | MF | (Brazil) Iago | (Portugal) Portimonense | Loan return | 25 June 2021 | |
| 40 | DF | (Brazil) Bueno | (Japan) Kashima Antlers | Loan return | 30 June 2021 | |
| – | MF | (Brazil) Edinho | Fortaleza | €250,000 | 2 July 2021 | |
| – | FW | (Brazil) Denílson | (Portugal) Paços de Ferreira | Free transfer | 6 July 2021 | |
| 30 | DF | (Brazil) Gabriel | (Japan) Yokohama FC | €1,700,000 | 13 July 2021 | |
| 38 | FW | (Brazil) Marrony | (Denmark) Midtjylland | €4,500,000 | 11 August 2021 | |
| Total | | | | | €8,800,000 | |

=== Loans out ===
| No. | Pos | Player | Transferred to | Fee | Start date | End date | Source |
|---|---|---|---|---|---|---|---|
| – | DF | (Brazil) Gustavo Henrique | Bahia | Undisclosed | 21 January 2021 | 31 December 2021 | |
| – | MF | (Paraguay) Ramón Martínez | (Paraguay) Libertad | Undisclosed | 25 January 2021 | 31 December 2021 | |
| 50 | FW | (Brazil) Marquinhos | (Bulgaria) Botev Plovdiv | Undisclosed | 14 February 2021 | 30 June 2022 | |
| – | DF | (Brazil) Isaque | Confiança | Undisclosed | 18 February 2021 | 30 November 2021 | |
| – | MF | (Brazil) Daniel Penha | Bahia | Undisclosed | 18 February 2021 | 31 December 2021 | |
| – | MF | (Brazil) Ralph | Boavista | Undisclosed | 18 February 2021 | 30 November 2021 | |
| – | DF | (Brazil) Vitor Mendes | Juventude | Undisclosed | 19 February 2021 | 31 December 2021 | |
| – | MF | (Brazil) Guilherme Castilho | Juventude | Undisclosed | 23 February 2021 | 31 December 2021 | |
| – | MF | (Brazil) Alessandro Vinícius | São José | Undisclosed | 1 March 2021 | 30 November 2021 | |
| – | MF | (Brazil) Bruninho | Confiança | Undisclosed | 1 March 2021 | 30 November 2021 | |
| – | MF | (Brazil) Nathan Silva | Atlético Goianiense | Undisclosed | 1 March 2021 | 31 December 2021 | |
| – | FW | (Brazil) Guilherme Santos | Coimbra | Undisclosed | 11 March 2021 | 31 May 2021 | |
| – | MF | (Brazil) Gustavo Blanco | Fortaleza | Undisclosed | 15 March 2021 | 31 December 2021 | |
| – | MF | (Brazil) José Welison | Sport Recife | Undisclosed | 8 April 2021 | 31 December 2021 | |
| – | FW | (Brazil) Guilherme Santos | Vitória | Undisclosed | 8 May 2021 | 30 November 2021 | |
| 50 | DF | (Brazil) Talison | Londrina | Undisclosed | 23 May 2021 | 30 November 2021 | |
| – | MF | (Brazil) Bruninho | Juventude | Undisclosed | 25 May 2021 | 31 December 2021 | |
| 49 | DF | (Brazil) Kevin | Brasil de Pelotas | Undisclosed | 26 May 2021 | 30 November 2021 | |
| – | MF | (Brazil) Daniel Penha | Confiança | Undisclosed | 27 May 2021 | 31 December 2021 | |
| – | MF | (Brazil) Adriano | Paraná | Undisclosed | 28 May 2021 | 30 November 2021 | |
| – | DF | (Brazil) Maílton | (Ukraine) Metalist Kharkiv | Undisclosed | 4 June 2021 | 30 June 2022 | |
| – | GK | (Brazil) Michael | Confiança | Undisclosed | 1 July 2021 | 30 November 2021 | |
| – | MF | (Brazil) Daniel Penha | (Australia) Newcastle Jets | Undisclosed | 20 August 2021 | 30 June 2022 | |
| – | DF | (Brazil) Iago Maidana | (Portugal) Gil Vicente | Undisclosed | 23 August 2021 | 30 June 2022 | |
| – | DF | (Brazil) Talison | (Portugal) Alverca | Undisclosed | 26 August 2021 | 30 June 2022 | |
| – | MF | (Brazil) Adriano | Confiança | Undisclosed | 10 September 2021 | 30 November 2021 | |
| Total | | | | | | – | |

=== Transfer summary ===
Undisclosed fees are not included in the transfer totals.

Expenditure

Total: ▼€6,170,000

Income

Total: ▲€8,800,000

Net total

Total: ▲€2,630,000

== Competitions ==
=== Overview ===
| Competition | First match | Last match | Starting round | Final position | Record | | | | | | | |
| Competition | First match | Last match | Starting round | Final position | Pld | W | D | L | GF | GA | GD | Win % |
|---|---|---|---|---|---|---|---|---|---|---|---|---|
| Campeonato Brasileiro | 30 May 2021 | 9 December 2021 | Matchday 1 | Winners | 38 | 26 | 6 | 6 | 67 | 34 | +33 | 68.42 |
| Campeonato Mineiro | 28 February 2021 | 22 May 2021 | First stage | Winners | 15 | 10 | 3 | 2 | 27 | 8 | +19 | 66.67 |
| Copa do Brasil | 2 June 2021 | 15 December 2021 | Third round | Winners | 10 | 9 | 0 | 1 | 22 | 6 | +16 | 90.00 |
| Copa Libertadores | 21 April 2021 | 28 September 2021 | Group stage | Semi-finals | 12 | 7 | 5 | 0 | 20 | 4 | +16 | 58.33 |
| Total | | | | | 75 | 52 | 14 | 9 | 136 | 52 | +84 | 69.33 |

Last updated: 15 December 2021
Source: Soccerway

=== Campeonato Mineiro ===
==== First stage ====
| Pos | Team | Pld | W | D | L | GF | GA | GD | Pts | Qualification or relegation |
|---|---|---|---|---|---|---|---|---|---|---|
| 1 | Atlético Mineiro | 11 | 9 | 0 | 2 | 23 | 7 | +16 | 27 | Knockout stage |
| 2 | América Mineiro | 11 | 7 | 1 | 3 | 17 | 9 | +8 | 22 | Knockout stage |
| 3 | Cruzeiro | 11 | 6 | 2 | 3 | 12 | 4 | +8 | 20 | Knockout stage |
| 4 | Tombense | 11 | 5 | 5 | 1 | 16 | 9 | +7 | 20 | Knockout stage |
| 5 | URT | 11 | 5 | 1 | 5 | 8 | 16 | −8 | 16 | Troféu Inconfidência |

Source: FMF
Rules for classification: 1) Points; 2) Wins; 3) Goal difference; 4) Goals scored; 5) Head-to-head results (only if two teams are tied); 6) Fewest red cards received; 7) Fewest yellow cards received; 8) Draw.

==== Matches ====
| 28 February 1 | Atlético Mineiro | 3–0 | URT | Belo Horizonte |
| 18:15 UTC−3 | Diego Tardelli 25'; Marrony 50'; Echaporã 90+6' | Report | | Stadium: Mineirão; Attendance: 0 (Note: Match played behind closed doors due to the COVID-19 pandemic); Referee: Ricardo Marques Ribeiro |

| 4 March 2 | Tombense | 1–2 | Atlético Mineiro | Tombos |
| 21:00 UTC−3 | Caique 11' | Report | Marrony 31'; Gabriel 58' | Stadium: Almeidão; Attendance: 0 Referee: Felipe Fernandes de Lima |

| 7 March 3 | Atlético Mineiro | 4–0 | Uberlândia | Belo Horizonte |
| 20:30 UTC−3 | Zaracho 22'; Calebe 52'; Júlio Cesar 72'; Diego Tardelli 81' | Report | | Stadium: Mineirão; Attendance: 0 Referee: Emerson de Almeida Ferreira |

| 13 March 4 | Patrocinense | 1–3 | Atlético Mineiro | Belo Horizonte |
| 16:30 UTC−3 | Alisson 49' | Report | Igor Rabello 28'; Vargas 47'; Marrony 54' | Stadium: Independência; Attendance: 0 Referee: Igor Junio Benevenuto |

| 19 March 5 | Atlético Mineiro | 3–0 | Coimbra | Belo Horizonte |
| 17:30 UTC−3 | Ignacio Fernández 27'; Igor Rabello 36'; Hulk 45' (pen.) | Report | | Stadium: Mineirão; Attendance: 0 Referee: Michel Patrick Costa Guimarães |

| 1 April 6 | Caldense | 2–1 | Atlético Mineiro | Poços de Caldas |
| 17:30 UTC−3 | Verrone 49'; Gabriel Tonini 81' | Report | Keno 22' | Stadium: Ronaldão; Attendance: 0 Referee: Paulo Cesar Zanovelli |

| 4 April 7 | Atlético Mineiro | 3–1 | América Mineiro | Belo Horizonte |
| 16:00 UTC−3 | Ignacio Fernández 17', 71'; Guilherme Arana 88' | Report | João Paulo 56' | Stadium: Mineirão; Attendance: 0 Referee: Marco Aurélio Augusto Fazekas Ferreira |

| 7 April 8 | Atlético Mineiro | 1–0 | Pouso Alegre | Belo Horizonte |
| 16:00 UTC−3 | Eduardo Vargas 38' | Report | | Stadium: Mineirão; Attendance: 0 Referee: Wanderson Alves de Sousa |

| 11 April 9 | Cruzeiro | 1–0 | Atlético Mineiro | Belo Horizonte |
| 16:00 UTC−3 | Airton Sousa 61' | Report | | Stadium: Mineirão; Attendance: 0 Referee: Paulo Cesar Zanovelli |

| 18 April 10 | Atlético Mineiro | 2–1 | Boa Esporte | Belo Horizonte |
| 16:00 UTC−3 | Eduardo Vargas 30'; Guilherme Arana 90' (pen.) | Report | Tiago Silva 21' | Stadium: Mineirão; Attendance: 0 Referee: Ronei Cândido Alves |

| 24 April 11 | Athletic | 0–1 | Atlético Mineiro | Belo Horizonte |
| 19:00 UTC−3 | | Report | Mariano 16' | Stadium: Independência; Attendance: 0 Referee: Ricardo Marques Ribeiro |

==== Knockout stage ====
===== Semi-finals =====
| 1 May First leg | Tombense | 0–3 | Atlético Mineiro | Belo Horizonte |
| 16:30 UTC−3 | | Report | Hyoran 15'; Guga 21' (pen.); Hulk 61' | Stadium: Estádio Independência, Belo Horizonte; Attendance: 0 Referee: Wanderson Alves de Souza |

| 8 May Second leg | Atlético Mineiro | 1–1 (4–1 agg.) | Tombense | Belo Horizonte |
| 16:30 UTC−3 | Eduardo Sasha 8' | Report | Caique Calito 79' | Stadium: Mineirão; Attendance: 0 Referee: Paulo César Zanovelli da Silva |

===== Finals =====
| 16 May First leg | América Mineiro | 0–0 | Atlético Mineiro | Belo Horizonte |
| 16:00 UTC−3 | | Report | | Stadium: Independência; Attendance: 0 Referee: Wanderson Alves de Souza |

| 22 May Second leg | Atlético Mineiro | 0–0 (0–0 agg.) | América Mineiro | Belo Horizonte |
| 16:30 UTC−3 | | Report | | Stadium: Mineirão; Attendance: 0 Referee: Felipe Fernandes de Lima |
Note: Atlético Mineiro was champion due to the fact that he had the best campaign of the first phase, according to the regulation.

=== Copa Libertadores ===
| Pos | Team | Pld | W | D | L | GF | GA | GD | Pts | Qualification |
|---|---|---|---|---|---|---|---|---|---|---|
| 1 | (Brazil) Atlético Mineiro | 6 | 5 | 1 | 0 | 15 | 3 | +12 | 16 | Round of 16 |
| 2 | (Paraguay) Cerro Porteño | 6 | 3 | 1 | 2 | 4 | 5 | −1 | 10 | Round of 16 |
| 3 | (Colombia) América de Cali | 6 | 1 | 1 | 4 | 5 | 9 | −4 | 4 | Copa Sudamericana |
| 4 | (Venezuela) Deportivo La Guaira | 6 | 0 | 3 | 3 | 2 | 9 | −7 | 3 | |

Source: CONMEBOL
Rules for classification: 1) Points; 2) Goal difference; 3) Goals scored; 4) Away goals scored; 5) CONMEBOL ranking.

| 21 April 1 | Deportivo La Guaira (Venezuela) | 1–1 | (Brazil) Atlético Mineiro | Caracas, Venezuela |
| 19:00 UTC−3 | Luis Martínez 20' | Report | Matías Zaracho 65' | Stadium: Estadio Olímpico de la UCV; Attendance: 0 Referee: Facundo Tello Figueroa (Argentina) |

| 27 April 2 | Atlético Mineiro (Brazil) | 2–1 | (Colombia) América de Cali | Belo Horizonte, Brazil |
| 21:30 UTC−3 | Hulk 59' (pen.), 63' | Report | Luis Sánchez 77' | Stadium: Mineirão; Attendance: 0 Referee: Daniel Fedorczuk (Uruguay) |

| 4 May 3 | Atlético Mineiro (Brazil) | 4–0 | (Paraguay) Cerro Porteño | Belo Horizonte, Brazil |
| 19:15 UTC−3 | Hulk 9', 45+1'; Jefferson Savarino 73'; Eduardo Vargas 90+2' | Report | | Stadium: Mineirão; Attendance: 0 Referee: Néstor Pitana (Argentina) |

| 13 May 4 | América de Cali (Colombia) | 1–3 | (Brazil) Atlético Mineiro | Cali, Colombia |
| 21:00 UTC−3 | Santiago Moreno 24' | Report | Hulk 21'; Guilherme Arana 54'; Eduardo Vargas 90+7' | Stadium: Estadio Olímpico Pascual Guerrero; Attendance: 0 Referee: Andrés Cunha (Uruguay) |

| 19 May 5 | Cerro Porteño (Paraguay) | 0–1 | (Brazil) Atlético Mineiro | Asunción, Paraguay |
| 21:00 UTC−3 | | Report | Keno 90+2' | Stadium: General Pablo Rojas Stadium (La Olla); Attendance: 0 Referee: Esteban Ostojich (Uruguay) |

| 25 May 6 | Atlético Mineiro (Brazil) | 4–0 | (Venezuela) Deportivo La Guaira | Belo Horizonte, Brazil |
| 21:30 UTC−3 | Savarino 28'; Marrony 44'; Hulk 50'; Nathan 90+4' | Report | | Stadium: Mineirão; Attendance: 0 Referee: Nicolás Lamolina (Argentina) |

==== Round of 16 ====
The draw for the round of 16 was held on 1 June 2021.

| 13 July First leg | Boca Juniors (Argentina) | 0–0 | (Brazil) Atlético Mineiro | Buenos Aires, Argentina |
| 19:15 UTC−3 | | Report | | Stadium: La Bombonera; Attendance: 0 Referee: Andrés Rojas (Colombia) |

| 20 July Second leg | Atlético Mineiro (Brazil) | 0–0 (0–0 agg.) (3–1 p) | (Argentina) Boca Juniors | Belo Horizonte, Brazil |
| 19:15 UTC−3 | | Report | | Stadium: Mineirão; Attendance: 0 Referee: Esteban Ostojich (Uruguay) |
| | Penalties |
| | Hulk (penalty missed); Nacho Fernández (penalty scored); Júnior Alonso (penalty scored); Hyoran (penalty missed); Everson (penalty scored) | | Marcos Rojo (penalty scored); Sebastián Villa (penalty missed); Esteban Rolón (penalty missed); Carlos Izquierdoz (penalty missed) |

==== Quarter-finals ====
| 11 August First leg | River Plate (Argentina) | 0–1 | (Brazil) Atlético Mineiro | Buenos Aires, Argentina |
| 21:30 UTC−3 | | Report | Nacho Fernández 58' | Stadium: Estadio Monumental Antonio Vespucio Liberti; Attendance: 0 Referee: Jesús Valenzuela Sáez (Venezuela) |

| 18 August Second leg | Atlético Mineiro (Brazil) | 3–0 (4–0 agg.) | (Argentina) River Plate | Belo Horizonte, Brazil |
| 21:30 UTC−3 | Matías Zaracho 22', 61'; Hulk 34' | Report | | Stadium: Mineirão; Attendance: 17,030; Referee: Roberto Tobar (Chile) |

==== Semi-finals ====
| 21 September First leg | Palmeiras (Brazil) | 0–0 | (Brazil) Atlético Mineiro | São Paulo, Brazil |
| 21:30 | | Report | | Stadium: Allianz Parque; Attendance: 0 Referee: Patricio Loustau (Argentina) |

| 28 September Second leg | Atlético Mineiro (Brazil) | 1–1 (1–1a agg.) | (Brazil) Palmeiras | Belo Horizonte, Brazil |
| 21:30 | Eduardo Vargas 52' | Report | Dudu 68' | Stadium: Mineirão; Attendance: 18,350; Referee: Wilmar Roldán (Colombia) |

=== Campeonato Brasileiro ===
==== Standings ====
| Pos | Team | Pld | W | D | L | GF | GA | GD | Pts | Qualification or relegation |
|---|---|---|---|---|---|---|---|---|---|---|
| 1 | Atlético Mineiro (C) | 38 | 26 | 6 | 6 | 67 | 34 | +33 | 84 | Qualification for Copa Libertadores group stage (Note: Palmeiras qualified for the Copa Libertadores group stage by winning the 2021 Copa Libertadores.) |
| 2 | Flamengo | 38 | 21 | 8 | 9 | 69 | 36 | +33 | 71 | Qualification for Copa Libertadores group stage |
| 3 | Palmeiras | 38 | 20 | 6 | 12 | 58 | 43 | +15 | 66 | Qualification for Copa Libertadores group stage |
| 4 | Fortaleza | 38 | 17 | 7 | 14 | 44 | 45 | −1 | 58 | Qualification for Copa Libertadores group stage |
| 5 | Corinthians | 38 | 15 | 12 | 11 | 40 | 36 | +4 | 57 | Qualification for Copa Libertadores group stage |

Source: CBF
Rules for classification: 1) points; 2) wins; 3) goal difference; 4) goals scored; 5) head-to-head results (only between two teams); 6) fewest red cards; 7) fewest yellow cards; 8) drawing of lots.
(C) Champions

==== Result by round ====
| Round | 1 | 2 | 3 | 4 | 5 | 6 | 7 | 8 | 9 | 10 | 11 | 12 | 13 | 14 | 15 | 16 | 17 | 18 | 19 | 20 | 21 | 22 | 23 | 24 | 25 | 26 | 27 | 28 | 29 | 30 | 31 | 32 | 33 | 34 | 35 | 36 | 37 | 38 |
|---|---|---|---|---|---|---|---|---|---|---|---|---|---|---|---|---|---|---|---|---|---|---|---|---|---|---|---|---|---|---|---|---|---|---|---|---|---|---|
| Result | L | W | W | W | D | L | L | W | W | W | W | W | W | W | W | W | D | D | W | W | W | D | W | D | W | W | L | W | L | W | W | W | W | W | D | W | W | L |
| Position | 15 | 9 | 5 | 3 | 5 | 7 | 8 | 5 | 4 | 4 | 3 | 2 | 2 | 2 | 1 | 1 | 1 | 1 | 1 | 1 | 1 | 1 | 1 | 1 | 1 | 1 | 1 | 1 | 1 | 1 | 1 | 1 | 1 | 1 | 1 | 1 | 1 | 1 |

Source: CBF

==== Matches ====
| 30 May 1 | Atlético Mineiro | 1–2 | Fortaleza | Belo Horizonte |
| 11:00 UTC−3 | Hulk 40' (pen.) | Report | Yago Pikachu 60', 90+4' | Stadium: Mineirão; Attendance: 0 Referee: Caio Max Augusto Vieira |

| 6 June 2 | Sport | 0–1 | Atlético Mineiro | Recife |
| 20:30 UTC−3 | | Report | Hulk 14' | Stadium: Ilha do Retiro; Attendance: 0 Referee: Raphael Claus |

| 13 June 3 | Atlético Mineiro | 1–0 | São Paulo | Belo Horizonte |
| 16:00 UTC−3 | Jair 17' | Report | | Stadium: Mineirão; Attendance: 0 Referee: Anderson Daronco |

| 16 June 4 | Internacional | 0–1 | Atlético Mineiro | Porto Alegre |
| 19:00 UTC−3 | | Report | Nathan 2' | Stadium: Estádio Beira-Rio; Attendance: 0 Referee: Luiz Flávio de Oliveira |

| 21 June 5 | Atlético Mineiro | 1–1 | Chapecoense | Belo Horizonte |
| 20:00 UTC−3 | Tchê Tchê 25' | Report | Ravanelli 80' (pen.) | Stadium: Mineirão; Attendance: 0 Referee: Rodolpho Toski Marques |

| 24 June 6 | Ceará | 2–1 | Atlético Mineiro | Fortaleza |
| 19:00 UTC−3 | Lima 3'; Gabriel Lacerda 90+6' | Report | Gabriel 72' | Stadium: Arena Castelão; Attendance: 0 Referee: Leando Vuaden |

| 27 June 7 | Santos | 2–0 | Atlético Mineiro | Santos |
| 20:30 UTC−3 | Jean Mota 57'; Marcos Guilherme 90+4' | Report | | Stadium: Vila Belmiro; Attendance: 0 Referee: Bruno Arleu de Araújo |

| 1 July 8 | Atlético Mineiro | 4–1 | Atlético Goianiense | Belo Horizonte |
| 19:00 UTC−3 | Matías Zaracho 27', 37'; Nacho Fernández 42', 89' | Report | Marlon Freitas 45+1' | Stadium: Mineirão; Attendance: 0 Referee: Flávio Rodrigues de Souza |

| 4 July 9 | Cuiabá | 0–1 | Atlético Mineiro | Cuiabá |
| 18:15 UTC−3 | | Report | Nacho Fernández 26' | Stadium: Arena Pantanal; Attendance: 0 Referee: Sávio Pereira |

| 7 July 10 | Atlético Mineiro | 2–1 | Flamengo | Belo Horizonte |
| 19:00 UTC−3 | Savarino 51', 53' | Report | Willian Arão 88' | Stadium: Mineirão; Attendance: 0 Referee: Paulo Roberto Alves Júnior |

| 10 July 11 | América Mineiro | 0–1 | Atlético Mineiro | Belo Horizonte |
| 19:00 UTC−3 | | Report | Dylan Borrero 68' | Stadium: Estádio Independência; Attendance: 0 Referee: Anderson Daronco |

| 17 July 12 | Corinhtians | 1–2 | Atlético Mineiro | São Paulo |
| 19:00 UTC−3 | Gustavo Silva 38' | Report | Hulk 64', 86' | Stadium: Neo Química Arena; Attendance: 0 Referee: Jean Pierre Gonçalves Lima |

| 25 July 13 | Atlético Mineiro | 3–0 | Bahia | Belo Horizonte |
| 11:00 UTC−3 | Hulk 58', 80' (pen.); Nathan 90+1' | Report | | Stadium: Mineirão; Attendance: 0 Referee: Antonio Dib Moraes de Sousa |

| 1 August 14 | Atlético Mineiro | 2–0 | Athletico Paranaense | Belo Horizonte |
| 18:15 UTC−3 | Vargas 60' (pen.); Neto 69' | Report | | Stadium: Mineirão; Attendance: 0 Referee: Bráulio da Silva Machado |

| 8 August 15 | Juventude | 1–2 | Atlético Mineiro | Caxias do Sul |
| 16:00 UTC−3 | Paulinho Bóia 45+1' | Report | Hulk 77'; Nathan Silva 90+2' | Stadium: Estádio Alfredo Jaconi; Attendance: 0 Referee: André Castro |

| 14 August 16 | Atlético Mineiro | 2–0 | Palmeiras | Belo Horizonte |
| 19:00 UTC−3 | Savarino 45+4', 62' | Report | | Stadium: Mineirão; Attendance: 0 Referee: Bruno Arleu de Araujo |

| 23 August 17 | Fluminense | 1–1 | Atlético Mineiro | Rio de Janeiro |
| 20:00 UTC−3 | Fred 25' (pen.) | Report | Eduardo Sasha 84' | Stadium: São Januário; Attendance: 0 Referee: Flávio Rodrigues de Souza |

| 29 August 18 | Red Bull Bragantino | 1–1 | Atlético Mineiro | Bragança Paulista |
| 20:30 UTC−3 | Nathan Silva 15' (o.g.) | Report | Diego Costa 85' | Stadium: Nabi Abi Chedid; Attendance: 0 Referee: Ramon Abatti |

| 12 September 20 | Fortaleza | 0–2 | Atlético Mineiro | Fortaleza |
| 16:00 UTC−3 | | Report | Matías Zaracho 49'; Júnior Alonso 69' | Stadium: Arena Castelão; Attendance: 0 Referee: Bráulio da Silva Machado |

| 18 September 21 | Atlético Mineiro | 3–0 | Sport | Belo Horizonte |
| 19:00 UTC−3 | Diego Costa 35'; Hulk 45+1'; Eduardo Vargas 90+9' (pen.) | Report | | Stadium: Mineirão; Attendance: 0 Referee: Vinícius Gonçalves Dias Araújo |

| 25 September 22 | São Paulo | 0–0 | Atlético Mineiro | São Paulo |
| 21:00 UTC−3 | | Report | | Stadium: Morumbi; Attendance: 0 Referee: Wilton Pereira Sampaio |

| 2 October 23 | Atlético Mineiro | 1–0 | Internacional | Belo Horizonte |
| 21:00 UTC−3 | Keno 79' | Report | | Stadium: Mineirão; Attendance: 7,166; Referee: Luiz Flávio de Oliveira |

| 6 October 24 | Chapecoense | 2–2 | Atlético Mineiro | Chapecó |
| 19:00 UTC−3 | Geuvânio 28'; Mike 70' (pen.) | Report | Dylan Borrero 19'; Eduardo Sasha 83' | Stadium: Arena Condá; Attendance: 660; Referee: André Castro |

| 10 October 25 | Atlético Mineiro | 3–1 | Ceará | Belo Horizonte |
| 16:00 UTC−3 | Hulk 32', 45+10' (pen.); Diego Costa 87' | Report | Gabriel Lacerda 90+2' | Stadium: Mineirão; Attendance: 10,265; Referee: Jefferson Ferreira de Moraes |

| 13 October 26 | Atlético Mineiro | 3–1 | Santos | Belo Horizonte |
| 19:00 UTC−3 | Nacho Fernández 69' (pen.), 81'; Nathan Silva 75' | Report | Raniel 48' | Stadium: Mineirão; Attendance: 16,514; Referee: Paulo Roberto Alves Júnior |

| 17 October 27 | Atlético Goianiense | 2–1 | Atlético Mineiro | Goiânia |
| 18:15 UTC−3 | Janderson 65'; Oliveira 81' | Report | Nathan Silva 59' | Stadium: Estádio Antônio Accioly; Referee: Raphael Claus |

| 24 October 28 | Atlético Mineiro | 2–1 | Cuiabá | Belo Horizonte |
| 16:00 UTC−3 | Hulk 4'; Jair 45+3' | Report | Nathan Silva 2' (o.g.) | Stadium: Mineirão; Attendance: 30,637; Referee: Sávio Pereira Sampaio |

| 30 October 29 | Flamengo | 1–0 | Atlético Mineiro | Rio de Janeiro |
| 19:00 UTC−3 | Michael 25' | Report | | Stadium: Maracanã; Attendance: 24,696; Referee: Anderson Daronco |

| 3 November 19 | Atlético Mineiro | 2–1 | Grêmio | Belo Horizonte |
| 21:00 UTC−3 | Matías Zaracho 12'; Eduardo Vargas 75' (pen.) | Report | Jaminton Campaz 56' | Stadium: Mineirão; Attendance: 56,624; Referee: Luiz Flávio de Oliveira |

| 7 November 30 | Atlético Mineiro | 1–0 | América Mineiro | Belo Horizonte |
| 16:00 UTC−3 | Guilherme Arana 62' | Report | | Stadium: Mineirão; Attendance: 60,142; Referee: Wilton Pereira Sampaio |

| 10 November 31 | Atlético Mineiro | 3–0 | Corinthians | Belo Horizonte |
| 19:00 UTC−3 | Diego Costa 14'; Keno 51'; Hulk 90+5' | Report | | Stadium: Mineirão; Attendance: 58,714; Referee: Bráulio da Silva Machado |

| 16 November 33 | Athletico Paranaense | 0–1 | Atlético Mineiro | Curitiba |
| 16:00 UTC−3 | | Report | Matías Zaracho 45' | Stadium: Arena da Baixada; Referee: Sávio Pereira Sampaio |

| 20 November 34 | Atlético Mineiro | 2–0 | Juventude | Belo Horizonte |
| 19:00 UTC−3 | Hulk 72' (pen.), 76' | Report | | Stadium: Mineirão; Attendance: 61,476; Referee: Luiz Flávio de Oliveira |

| 23 November 35 | Palmeiras | 2–2 | Atlético Mineiro | São Paulo |
| 21:30 UTC−3 | Wesley 28'; Deyverson 57' | Report | Matías Zaracho 36'; Hulk 61' | Stadium: Allianz Parque; Attendance: 17,744; Referee: Anderson Daronco |

| 28 November 36 | Atlético Mineiro | 2–1 | Fluminense | Belo Horizonte |
| 16:00 UTC−3 | Hulk 38' (pen.), 60' | Report | Manoel 14' | Stadium: Mineirão; Attendance: 59,896; Referee: Marielson Alves Silva |

| 2 December 32 | Bahia | 2–3 | Atlético Mineiro | Salvador |
| 18:00 UTC−3 | Luiz Otávio 62'; Gilberto 66' | Report | Hulk 73' (pen.); Keno 74', 77' | Stadium: Arena Fonte Nova; Attendance: 29,415; Referee: Flávio Rodrigues de Souza |

| 5 December 37 | Atlético Mineiro | 4–3 | Red Bull Bragantino | Belo Horizonte |
| 16:00 UTC−3 | Keno 20'; Matías Zaracho 52'; Jefferson Savarino 78'; Hulk 88' | Report | Ytalo 39'; Artur 47', 90+10' | Stadium: Mineirão; Attendance: 61,573; Referee: Rodolpho Toski Marques |

| 9 December 38 | Grêmio | 4–3 | Atlético Mineiro | Porto Alegre |
| 21:30 UTC−3 | Diego Souza 6', 20'; Jaminton Campaz 11'; Douglas Costa 59' | Report | Dodô 26'; Eduardo Vargas 35'; Hyoran 90+1' | Stadium: Arena do Grêmio; Attendance: 33,577; Referee: Raphael Claus |

=== Copa do Brasil ===
==== Third round ====
| 2 June First leg | Remo | 0–2 | Atlético Mineiro | Belém |
| 19:00 UTC−3 | | Report | Hyoran 15'; Nacho Fernández 45+2' | Stadium: Baenão; Attendance: 0 Referee: Antonio Dib Moraes de Sousa |

| 10 June Second leg | Atlético Mineiro | 2–1 (4–1 agg.) | Remo | Belo Horizonte |
| 19:00 UTC−3 | Réver 10'; Hulk 51' (pen.) | Report | Romércio 45' | Stadium: Mineirão; Attendance: 0 Referee: Jefferson Ferreira de Moraes |

==== Round of 16 ====
| 28 July First leg | Atlético Mineiro | 2–0 | Bahia | Belo Horizonte |
| 21:30 UTC−3 | Matías Zaracho 37'; Hulk 74' | Report | | Stadium: Mineirão; Attendance: 0 Referee: Raphael Claus |

| 4 August Second leg | Bahia | 2–1 (2–3 agg.) | Atlético Mineiro | Salvador |
| 21:30 UTC−3 | Rossi 12'; Juninho Capixaba 45+10' | Report | Eduardo Vargas 63' | Stadium: Estádio de Pituaçu; Attendance: 0 Referee: Vinícius Gonçalves Dias Araújo |

===== Quarter-finals =====
| 26 August First leg | Fluminense | 1–2 | Atlético Mineiro | Rio de Janeiro |
| 21:30 UTC−3 | Fred 42' (pen.) | Report | Nino 13' (o.g.); Hulk 45+4' | Stadium: Estádio Nilton Santos; Attendance: 0 Referee: Anderson Daronco |

| 15 September Second leg | Atlético Mineiro | 1–0 (3–1 agg.) | Fluminense | Belo Horizonte |
| 19:00 UTC−3 | Hulk 56' (pen.) | Report | | Stadium: Mineirão; Attendance: 0 Referee: Raphael Claus |

===== Semi-finals =====
| 20 October First leg | Atlético Mineiro | 4–0 | Fortaleza | Belo Horizonte |
| 21:30 UTC−3 | Guilherme Arana 19'; Réver 26'; Hulk 41'; Matías Zaracho 47' | Report | | Stadium: Mineirão; Attendance: 18,642; Referee: Bráulio da Silva Machado |

| 27 October Second leg | Fortaleza | 1–2 (1–6 agg.) | Atlético Mineiro | Fortaleza |
| 21:30 UTC−3 | Romarinho 90' | Report | Diego Costa 59'; Hulk 84' (pen.) | Stadium: Arena Castelão; Attendance: 9,518; Referee: Vinícius Gonçalves Dias Araújo |

===== Finals =====
| 12 December First leg | Atlético Mineiro | 4–0 | Athletico Paranaense | Belo Horizonte |
| 17:30 UTC−3 | Hulk 24' (pen.); Keno 35'; Eduardo Vargas 56', 69' | Report | | Stadium: Mineirão; Attendance: 53,181; Referee: Bruno Arleu de Araújo |

| 15 December Second leg | Athletico Paranaense | 1–2 (1–6 agg.) | Atlético Mineiro | Curitiba |
| 21:30 UTC−3 | Jáderson 87' | Report | Keno 25'; Hulk 75' | Stadium: Arena da Baixada; Referee: Anderson Daronco |

== Statistics ==
=== Squad appearances and goals ===
Last updated on 15 December 2021.

| No. | Pos | Nat | Player | Total | | Brasileiro | | Mineiro | | Copa do Brasil | | Libertadores | |
| No. | Pos | Nat | Player | Apps | Goals | Apps | Goals | Apps | Goals | Apps | Goals | Apps | Goals |
Goalkeepers
| 22 | GK | (Brazil) BRA | Everson | 68 | 0 | 37 | 0 | 9 | 0 | 10 | 0 | 12 | 0 |
| 31 | GK | (Brazil) BRA | Matheus Mendes | 3 | 0 | 0 | 0 | 1+2 | 0 | 0 | 0 | 0 | 0 |
| 32 | GK | (Brazil) BRA | Rafael | 5 | 0 | 1 | 0 | 4 | 0 | 0 | 0 | 0 | 0 |
| 34 | GK | (Brazil) BRA | Jean | 0 | 0 | 0 | 0 | 0 | 0 | 0 | 0 | 0 | 0 |
Defenders
| 2 | DF | (Brazil) BRA | Guga | 41 | 1 | 20+5 | 0 | 6+1 | 1 | 3+1 | 0 | 4+1 | 0 |
| 3 | DF | (Paraguay) PAR | Júnior Alonso | 51 | 1 | 22 | 1 | 9 | 0 | 8 | 0 | 12 | 0 |
| 4 | DF | (Brazil) BRA | Réver | 41 | 2 | 15+7 | 0 | 5 | 0 | 6+2 | 2 | 2+4 | 0 |
| 6 | DF | (Brazil) BRA | Dodô | 34 | 1 | 10+4 | 1 | 9+1 | 0 | 4+1 | 0 | 1+4 | 0 |
| 13 | DF | (Brazil) BRA | Guilherme Arana | 49 | 5 | 26 | 1 | 7 | 2 | 6 | 1 | 10 | 1 |
| 16 | DF | (Brazil) BRA | Igor Rabello | 37 | 2 | 8+4 | 0 | 11+2 | 2 | 6+1 | 0 | 4+1 | 0 |
| 25 | DF | (Brazil) BRA | Mariano | 50 | 1 | 18+7 | 0 | 8+2 | 1 | 7 | 0 | 8 | 0 |
| 40 | DF | (Brazil) BRA | Nathan Silva | 34 | 3 | 28 | 3 | 0 | 0 | 0 | 0 | 6 | 0 |
| 45 | DF | (Brazil) BRA | Micael | 1 | 0 | 1 | 0 | 0 | 0 | 0 | 0 | 0 | 0 |
| | DF | (Brazil) BRA | Matheus Lima | 3 | 0 | 0 | 0 | 0+3 | 0 | 0 | 0 | 0 | 0 |
Midfielders
| 8 | MF | (Brazil) BRA | Jair | 46 | 2 | 20+8 | 2 | 3 | 0 | 6+2 | 0 | 5+2 | 0 |
| 15 | MF | (Argentina) ARG | Matías Zaracho | 58 | 13 | 29+3 | 7 | 7+2 | 1 | 6+1 | 2 | 7+3 | 3 |
| 20 | MF | (Brazil) BRA | Hyoran | 33 | 3 | 9+9 | 1 | 2+7 | 1 | 2+1 | 1 | 1+2 | 0 |
| 21 | MF | (Ecuador) ECU | Alan Franco | 15 | 0 | 1+4 | 0 | 1+4 | 0 | 1 | 0 | 0+4 | 0 |
| 23 | MF | (Brazil) BRA | Nathan | 39 | 3 | 4+18 | 2 | 2+5 | 0 | 0+5 | 0 | 0+5 | 1 |
| 26 | MF | (Argentina) ARG | Ignacio Fernández | 52 | 10 | 20+6 | 5 | 7 | 3 | 6+3 | 1 | 10 | 1 |
| 27 | MF | (Brazil) BRA | Calebe | 24 | 1 | 1+13 | 0 | 5 | 1 | 0+3 | 0 | 0+2 | 0 |
| 29 | MF | (Brazil) BRA | Allan | 61 | 0 | 31+1 | 0 | 8+1 | 0 | 9 | 0 | 10+1 | 0 |
| 30 | MF | (Colombia) COL | Dylan Borrero | 26 | 2 | 6+9 | 2 | 5+1 | 0 | 0+2 | 0 | 0+3 | 0 |
| 37 | MF | (Brazil) BRA | Tchê Tchê | 57 | 1 | 22+11 | 1 | 5 | 0 | 5+4 | 0 | 8+2 | 0 |
| 41 | MF | (Brazil) BRA | Neto | 8 | 1 | 0+4 | 1 | 0+2 | 0 | 0+2 | 0 | 0 | 0 |
| 44 | MF | (Brazil) BRA | Rubens | 1 | 0 | 0 | 0 | 0+1 | 0 | 0 | 0 | 0 | 0 |
Forwards
| 7 | FW | (Brazil) BRA | Hulk | 68 | 36 | 33+2 | 19 | 9+2 | 2 | 9+1 | 8 | 9+3 | 7 |
| 10 | FW | (Chile) CHI | Eduardo Vargas | 43 | 13 | 8+8 | 4 | 6+3 | 3 | 4+3 | 3 | 6+5 | 3 |
| 11 | FW | (Brazil) BRA | Keno | 44 | 9 | 17+7 | 5 | 7 | 1 | 4+2 | 2 | 4+3 | 1 |
| 17 | FW | (Venezuela) VEN | Jefferson Savarino | 40 | 7 | 11+7 | 5 | 5+3 | 0 | 3+2 | 0 | 8+1 | 2 |
| 18 | FW | (Brazil) BRA | Eduardo Sasha | 50 | 3 | 4+19 | 2 | 3+8 | 1 | 2+7 | 0 | 1+6 | 0 |
| 19 | FW | (Spain) ESP | Diego Costa | 19 | 5 | 9+6 | 4 | 0 | 0 | 2+1 | 1 | 1 | 0 |
| 28 | FW | (Brazil) BRA | Felipe Felicio | 9 | 0 | 0+5 | 0 | 1+3 | 0 | 0 | 0 | 0 | 0 |
| 33 | FW | (Brazil) BRA | Sávio | 13 | 0 | 0+4 | 0 | 4+3 | 0 | 0+2 | 0 | 0 | 0 |
| 43 | FW | (Brazil) BRA | Luiz Filipe | 2 | 0 | 0+2 | 0 | 0 | 0 | 0 | 0 | 0 | 0 |
| 47 | FW | (Brazil) BRA | Júlio Cesar | 3 | 1 | 0 | 0 | 0+3 | 1 | 0 | 0 | 0 | 0 |
| 48 | FW | (Brazil) BRA | Echaporã | 5 | 1 | 0+2 | 0 | 0+3 | 1 | 0 | 0 | 0 | 0 |
Players who have made an appearance this season but have left the club
| 1 | GK | (Brazil) BRA | Victor | 1 | 0 | 0 | 0 | 1 | 0 | 0 | 0 | 0 | 0 |
| 9 | FW | (Brazil) BRA | Diego Tardelli | 7 | 2 | 0 | 0 | 3+2 | 2 | 0 | 0 | 0+2 | 0 |
| 30 | DF | (Brazil) BRA | Gabriel | 14 | 2 | 4+1 | 1 | 6+1 | 1 | 1 | 0 | 1 | 0 |
| 38 | FW | (Brazil) BRA | Marrony | 25 | 4 | 2+5 | 0 | 5+7 | 3 | 0+2 | 0 | 2+2 | 1 |
| 40 | DF | (Brazil) BRA | Bueno | 1 | 0 | 1 | 0 | 0 | 0 | 0 | 0 | 0 | 0 |
| 46 | MF | (Brazil) BRA | Iago | 1 | 0 | 0 | 0 | 0+1 | 0 | 0 | 0 | 0 | 0 |
| 50 | DF | (Brazil) BRA | Talison | 1 | 0 | 0 | 0 | 1 | 0 | 0 | 0 | 0 | 0 |
