= Neto (footballer, born 2002) =

Brazilian footballer

Personal information
- Full name: Antônio Fialho de Carvalho Neto
- Date of birth: 11 September 2002 (age 24)
- Place of birth: Guanambi, Brazil
- Height: 1.78 m (5 ft 10 in)
- Positions: Defensive midfielder; right-back

Team information
- Current team: Al Bataeh
- Number: 5

Youth career
- 2015–2021: Atlético Mineiro

Senior career*
Years	Team	Apps	(Gls)
2018–2024	Atlético Mineiro	10	(1)
2023	→ Chapecoense (loan)	18	(3)
2024	→ Villa Nova (loan)	7	(2)
2024–	Al Bataeh	1	(0)

International career^{‡}
2018–2019	Brazil U17	5	(0)
- * Club domestic league appearances and goals as of 24 December 2023 ‡ National team caps and goals as of 24 December 2023

Antônio Fialho de Carvalho Neto (born 11 September 2002), commonly known as Neto, is a Brazilian footballer who plays for Al Bataeh, either as a defensive midfielder or a right-back.

Neto joined Atlético's youth ranks in 2015, and made his professional debut on 23 January 2019, aged 16, in a Campeonato Mineiro 1–0 defeat to Tombense. He played for the Brazil U17s at the 2019 South American Championship.

== Career statistics ==
=== Club ===
As of 1 January 2024.

Club	Season	League			State League		Cup		Continental		Other		Total	
Club	Season	Division	Apps	Goals	Apps	Goals	Apps	Goals	Apps	Goals	Apps	Goals	Apps	Goals
Atlético Mineiro	2019	Série A	0	0	2 (Note: Appearance(s) in Campeonato Mineiro)	0	0	0	0	0	—		2	0
Atlético Mineiro	2021	Série A	4	1	2	0	2	0	0	0	—		8	1
Atlético Mineiro	2022	Série A	0	0	2	0	1	0	1 (Note: Appearance(s) in Copa Libertadores)	0	0	0	4	0
Atlético Mineiro	Total		4	1	6	0	3	0	1	0	0	0	14	1
Chapecoense (loan)	2023	Série B	8	1	10 (Note: Appearance(s) in Campeonato Catarinense)	2	1	0	—		—		19	3
Career total			12	2	16	2	4	0	1	0	0	0	33	4

== Honours ==
Atlético Mineiro

- Campeonato Brasileiro Série A: 2021
- Copa do Brasil: 2021
- Campeonato Mineiro: 2021, 2022
- Supercopa do Brasil: 2022
