= Matheus Mendes =

Brazilian footballer

Personal information
- Full name: Matheus Mendes Werneck de Oliveira
- Date of birth: 10 March 1999 (age 27)
- Place of birth: Governador Valadares, Brazil
- Height: 1.94 m (6 ft 4 in)
- Position: Goalkeeper

Team information
- Current team: Alverca
- Number: 31

Youth career
- 2014–2019: Atlético Mineiro

Senior career*
Years	Team	Apps	(Gls)
2020–2025	Atlético Mineiro	19	(0)
2020–2021	→ CSA (loan)	28	(0)
2025	→ América Mineiro (loan)	27	(0)
2025–	Alverca	9	(0)
- * Club domestic league appearances and goals as of 25 May 2026

Matheus Mendes Werneck de Oliveira (born 10 March 1999) is a Brazilian professional footballer who plays as a goalkeeper for Primeira Liga club Alverca.

== Club career ==
Born in Governador Valadares, Minas Gerais, Mendes joined Atlético Mineiro's youth setup in 2014. In January 2020, he was assigned to the first team squad.

On 16 September 2020, Mendes joined CSA on loan until the end of the 2020 Série B season. He promptly established himself as the first choice goalkeeper, making 28 league appearances for the side.

On 31 December 2024, Mendes joined América Mineiro on a season-long loan, which was cut short on 20 August 2025, when he made a permanent transfer to Portuguese Primeira Liga club Alverca, signing a three-year contract.

== International career ==
Mendes received a call up to the Brazil U20s in October 2018.

== Career statistics ==
As of 3 September 2025.

Club	Season	League			State League		Cup		Continental		Other		Total	
Club	Season	Division	Apps	Goals	Apps	Goals	Apps	Goals	Apps	Goals	Apps	Goals	Apps	Goals
Atlético Mineiro	2020	Série A	0	0	0	0	0	0	0	0	—		0	0
Atlético Mineiro	2021	Série A	0	0	3 (Note: Appearance(s) in Campeonato Mineiro)	0	0	0	0	0	—		3	0
Atlético Mineiro	2022	Série A	0	0	0	0	0	0	0	0	0	0	0	0
Atlético Mineiro	2023	Série A	2	0	0	0	0	0	0	0	—		2	0
Atlético Mineiro	2024	Série A	13	0	0	0	1	0	0	0	—		14	0
Atlético Mineiro	Total		15	0	3	0	1	0	0	0	0	0	19	0
CSA (loan)	2020	Série B	28	0	—		—		—		—		28	0
América Mineiro (loan)	2025	Série B	18	0	9	0	1	0	—		—		28	0
Alverca	2025–26	Primeira Liga	1	0	—		0	0	—		0	0	1	0
Career total			62	0	12	0	2	0	0	0	0	0	76	0

== Honours ==
Atlético Mineiro

- Campeonato Brasileiro Série A: 2021
- Copa do Brasil: 2021
- Campeonato Mineiro: 2020, 2021, 2022, 2023, 2024
- Supercopa do Brasil: 2022
