= Felipe Felicio =

Brazilian footballer (born 2002)

Personal information
- Full name: Felipe Felicio Silva Reis
- Date of birth: 6 November 2002 (age 24)
- Place of birth: Belo Horizonte, Brazil
- Height: 1.84 m (6 ft 0 in)
- Position: Forward

Team information
- Current team: Hellas Syros
- Number: 28

Youth career
- 2015–2022: Atlético Mineiro

Senior career*
Years	Team	Apps	(Gls)
2020–2024	Atlético Mineiro	11	(0)
2023–2024	→ Levadia (loan)	49	(17)
2024–2026	Panionios	20	(1)
2025	→ Domžale (loan)	9	(0)
2026–	Hellas Syros	0	(0)

International career
2019	Brazil U17		
- * Club domestic league appearances and goals as of 10 April 2026

Felipe Felicio Silva Reis (born 6 November 2002) is a Brazilian professional footballer who plays as a forward for Super League Greece 2 club Hellas Syros.

== Career ==
Born in Belo Horizonte, Felicio began his career at Atlético Mineiro and made his professional debut for the club on 28 February 2021 in a Campeonato Mineiro match against URT; he came on as a 67th minute substitute for Diego Tardelli as Atlético won 3–0.

In December 2022, Felicio reached an agreement to join Estonian club FCI Levadia on loan for the 2023 Meistriliiga season, which was eventually extended for an additional season.

== Career statistics ==
=== Club ===
As of match played 5 December 2025

Appearances and goals by club, season and competition
Club	Season	League			State league		National cup (Note: Includes Copa do Brasil, Estonian Cup, Greek Cup and Slovenian Cup)		Continental		Other		Total	
Club	Season	Division	Apps	Goals	Apps	Goals	Apps	Goals	Apps	Goals	Apps	Goals	Apps	Goals
Atlético Mineiro	2021	Série A	5	0	4 (Note: Appearance(s) in Campeonato Mineiro)	0	0	0	0	0	—		9	0
Atlético Mineiro	2022	Série A	0	0	2	0	1	0	0	0	0	0	3	0
Atlético Mineiro	2023	Série A	0	0	0	0	0	0	0	0	—		0	0
Atlético Mineiro	2024	Série A	0	0	0	0	0	0	0	0	—		0	0
Atlético Mineiro	Total		5	0	6	0	1	0	0	0	0	0	12	0
Levadia (loan)	2023	Meistriliiga	29	6	—		3	4	0	0	—		32	10
Levadia (loan)	2024	Meistriliiga	20	11	—		0	0	3 (Note: Appearance(s) in UEFA Europa Conference League)	1	—		23	12
Levadia (loan)	Total		49	17	—		3	4	3	1	—		55	22
Panionios	2024–25	Super League 2	1	1	—		4	0	—		—		5	1
Panionios	2025–26	Super League 2	0	0	—		0	0	—		—		0	0
Panionios	Total		1	1	—		4	0	—		—		5	1
Domžale (loan)	2025–26	Slovenian PrvaLiga	9	0	—		0	0	—		—		9	0
Career total			64	18	6	0	8	4	3	1	0	0	81	23

== Honours ==
Atlético Mineiro

- Campeonato Brasileiro Série A: 2021
- Copa do Brasil: 2021
- Campeonato Mineiro: 2020, 2021, 2022
- Supercopa do Brasil: 2022

Levadia

- Estonian Cup: 2023–24
