= Igor Rabello =

Brazilian footballer (born 1995)

Personal information
- Full name: Igor Rabello da Costa
- Date of birth: 28 April 1995 (age 31)
- Place of birth: Rio de Janeiro, Brazil
- Height: 1.91 m (6 ft 3 in)
- Position: Centre back

Team information
- Current team: Fluminense
- Number: 21

Youth career
- 2006–2011: Fluminense
- 2012–2015: Botafogo

Senior career*
Years	Team	Apps	(Gls)
2016–2018	Botafogo	92	(6)
2016	→ Náutico (loan)	15	(2)
2019–2025	Atlético Mineiro	153	(6)
2025–	Fluminense	4	(0)

International career
2014	Brazil U20	3	(1)
- * Club domestic league appearances and goals as of 13 December 2025

Igor Rabello da Costa (born 28 April 1995), known as Igor Rabello, is a Brazilian footballer who plays for Fluminense as a central defender.

== Club career ==
Born in Rio de Janeiro, Rabello joined Botafogo's youth setup in 2012, from rivals Fluminense. Promoted to the first team in December 2015, he made his senior debut the following 29 April by starting in a 1–1 Copa do Brasil home draw against Coruripe.

After being rarely used, Rabello joined Série B side Náutico on 20 May 2016, on loan until the end of the year. He contributed with two goals in 15 appearances for the club, his first coming on 4 September in a 4–3 away loss against Sampaio Corrêa.

Upon returning to Bota, Rabello became a regular starter and made his Série A debut on 15 May 2017, starting in a 2–0 loss at Grêmio. On 5 June, he renewed his contract until the end of 2019.

Rabello scored his first goal in the category on 24 October 2017, netting the winner in a 2–1 home defeat of Corinthians.

On 4 January 2019, Rabello joined Atlético Mineiro on a five-year contract. In seven seasons at the club, he made 202 official appearances and won nine trophies, including the Série A and Copa do Brasil in the team's treble-winning 2021 season.

On 22 August 2025, Rabello signed a deal with Fluminense running until December 2027.

== Career statistics ==
As of 14 August 2025.

Club	Season	League			State League		Cup		Continental		Other		Total	
Club	Season	Division	Apps	Goals	Apps	Goals	Apps	Goals	Apps	Goals	Apps	Goals	Apps	Goals
Botafogo	2016	Série A	0	0	0	0	1	0	—		—		1	0
Botafogo	2017	Série A	31	1	7 (Note: Appearance(s) in Campeonato Carioca)	1	4	0	5 (Note: Appearance(s) in Copa Libertadores)	0	—		47	2
Botafogo	2018	Série A	37	2	17	2	1	0	6 (Note: Appearance(s) in Copa Sudamericana)	0	—		61	4
Botafogo	Total		68	3	24	3	6	0	11	0	—		109	6
Náutico (loan)	2016	Série B	15	2	—		—		—		—		15	2
Atlético Mineiro	2019	Série A	33	0	10 (Note: Appearance(s) in Campeonato Mineiro)	0	4	0	17 (Note: Nine appearances in Copa Libertadores, eight appearances in Copa Sudamericana)	0	—		64	0
Atlético Mineiro	2020	Série A	24	1	8	2	2	0	1	0	—		35	3
Atlético Mineiro	2021	Série A	12	0	13	2	7	0	5	0	—		37	2
Atlético Mineiro	2022	Série A	7	1	8	0	3	0	1	0	0	0	19	1
Atlético Mineiro	2023	Série A	11	0	0	0	0	0	2	0	—		13	0
Atlético Mineiro	2024	Série A	16	0	6	0	1	0	3	0	—		26	0
Atlético Mineiro	2025	Série A	4	0	1	0	2	1	1	0	—		8	1
Atlético Mineiro	Total		107	2	46	4	19	1	30	0	0	0	202	7
Career total			190	7	70	7	25	1	41	0	0	0	326	15

== Honours ==
=== Club ===
Botafogo

- Campeonato Carioca: 2018

Atlético Mineiro

- Campeonato Brasileiro Série A: 2021
- Copa do Brasil: 2021
- Campeonato Mineiro: 2020, 2021, 2022, 2023, 2024, 2025
- Supercopa do Brasil: 2022

=== Individual ===
- Campeonato Carioca Team of the Year: 2018
- Campeonato Mineiro Team of the Year: 2021
