= Nathan Silva =

Brazilian footballer

Nathan
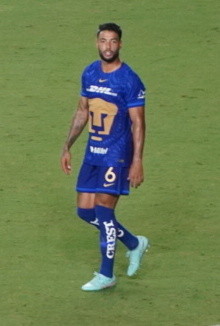
- Nathan with Pumas in 2025

Personal information
- Full name: Nathanael Ananias da Silva
- Date of birth: 6 May 1997 (age 29)
- Place of birth: Oliveira, Brazil
- Height: 1.84 m (6 ft 0 in)
- Position: Centre-back

Team information
- Current team: Pumas
- Number: 6

Youth career
- 2011–2017: Atlético Mineiro

Senior career*
| Years | Team | Apps | (Gls) |
| 2017–2023 | Atlético Mineiro | 70 | (3) |
| 2018–2019 | → Ponte Preta (loan) | 49 | (2) |
| 2019 | → Atlético Goianiense (loan) | 16 | (0) |
| 2020–2021 | → Coritiba (loan) | 27 | (1) |
| 2021 | → Atlético Goianiense (loan) | 12 | (1) |
| 2023– | Pumas | 92 | (5) |
- * Club domestic league appearances and goals as of 20:55, 8 December 2023 (UTC)

Nathanael Ananias da Silva (born 6 May 1997), known as Nathan Silva or simply Nathan, is a Brazilian professional soccer player who plays for Liga MX club Pumas. Mainly a central defender, he can also play as a defensive midfielder.

== Club career ==
Born in Oliveira, Minas Gerais, Nathan joined Atlético Mineiro's youth setup in 2011, aged 13. After taking part of the 2017 Florida Cup with the main squad, he made his professional debut on 9 April 2017 by coming on as a first-half substitute for Jesiel in a 1–2 Campeonato Mineiro away loss against Caldense.

On 20 February 2018, Nathan extended his contract until the end of 2021 and was loaned to Ponte Preta, initially until the end of the year. He then became a regular starter for the side, and scored his first goal on 8 August by netting the opener in a 4–0 away routing of Paysandu.

On 26 June 2019, after falling down the pecking order, Nathan cut short his loan deal, and joined Atlético Goianiense also in a temporary deal on 4 July. On 15 January 2020, after helping Dragão to achieve promotion to the Série A, he signed for Coritiba, also newly promoted, on loan for one year.

On 27 February 2021, Nathan rejoined Atlético Goianiense on another year-long loan. His performances prompted Atlético Mineiro manager Cuca to request his recall on 2 July. Back at his parent club, Nathan immediately established himself in the starting lineup, forming with Junior Alonso the defensive duo of the 2021 Campeonato Brasileiro Série A winning team.

On 20 June 2023, Atlético Mineiro announced that they had reached an agreement with Mexican club Pumas UNAM for the transfer of Nathan, with the deal being reportedly worth US$4 million.

== Personal life ==
Nathan's older brother Werley is also a centre back and was groomed at Atlético as well.

== Career statistics ==
As of 20 June 2023

| Club | Season | League | | | State League | | Cup | | Continental | | Other | | Total | |
| Club | Season | Division | Apps | Goals | Apps | Goals | Apps | Goals | Apps | Goals | Apps | Goals | Apps | Goals |
|---|---|---|---|---|---|---|---|---|---|---|---|---|---|---|
| Atlético Mineiro | 2017 | Série A | 0 | 0 | 1 | 0 | 0 | 0 | — | | — | | 1 | 0 |
| Atlético Mineiro | 2021 | Série A | 28 | 3 | — | | — | | 6 (Note: Appearance(s) in Copa Libertadores) | 0 | — | | 34 | 3 |
| Atlético Mineiro | 2022 | Série A | 22 | 0 | 8 | 0 | 2 | 0 | 9 | 0 | 1 (Note: Appearance in Supercopa do Brasil) | 0 | 42 | 0 |
| Atlético Mineiro | 2023 | Série A | 4 | 0 | 7 | 0 | 2 | 0 | 5 | 0 | — | | 18 | 0 |
| Atlético Mineiro | Total | | 54 | 3 | 16 | 0 | 4 | 0 | 20 | 0 | 1 | 0 | 95 | 3 |
| Ponte Preta (loan) | 2018 | Série B | 29 | 1 | 6 | 0 | 4 | 0 | — | | — | | 39 | 1 |
| Ponte Preta (loan) | 2019 | Série B | 2 | 0 | 12 | 1 | 1 | 0 | — | | — | | 15 | 1 |
| Ponte Preta (loan) | Total | | 31 | 1 | 18 | 1 | 5 | 0 | — | | — | | 54 | 2 |
| Atlético Goianiense (loan) | 2019 | Série B | 16 | 0 | — | | — | | — | | — | | 16 | 0 |
| Coritiba (loan) | 2020 | Série A | 19 | 1 | 8 | 0 | 0 | 0 | — | | — | | 27 | 1 |
| Atlético Goianiense (loan) | 2021 | Série A | 6 | 1 | 6 | 0 | 4 | 0 | 6 (Note: Appearance(s) in Copa Sudamericana) | 0 | — | | 22 | 1 |
| Pumas | 2022–23 | Liga MX | 0 | 0 | — | | — | | — | | — | | 0 | 0 |
| Career total | | | 126 | 6 | 48 | 1 | 13 | 0 | 26 | 0 | 1 | 0 | 215 | 7 |

== Honours ==
Atlético Mineiro

- Campeonato Brasileiro Série A: 2021
- Supercopa do Brasil: 2022
- Campeonato Mineiro: 2017, 2022, 2023

Individual

- Liga MX All-Star: 2026
