= Guilherme Arana =

Brazilian footballer (born 1997)

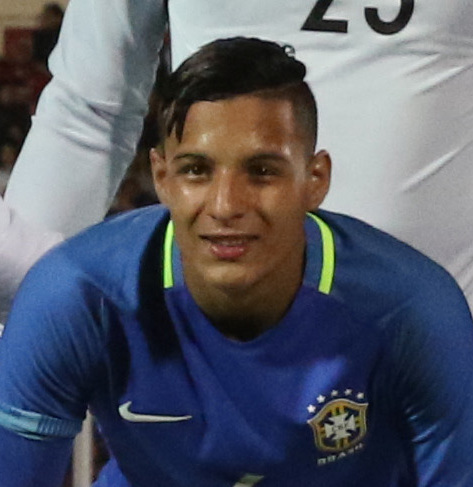
- Arana with Brazil U20 in 2017

Personal information
- Full name: Guilherme Antonio Arana Lopes
- Date of birth: 14 April 1997 (age 29)
- Place of birth: São Paulo, Brazil
- Height: 1.76 m (5 ft 9 in)
- Position: Left-back

Team information
- Current team: Fluminense
- Number: 13

Youth career
- 2005–2015: Corinthians

Senior career*
Years	Team	Apps	(Gls)
2014–2017	Corinthians	74	(3)
2015	→ Athlético Paranaense (loan)	3	(0)
2018–2021	Sevilla	12	(0)
2019–2020	→ Atalanta (loan)	4	(0)
2020–2021	→ Atlético Mineiro (loan)	58	(8)
2021–2026	Atlético Mineiro	139	(8)
2026–	Fluminense	14	(1)

International career^{‡}
2016–2017	Brazil U20	8	(2)
2019–2021	Brazil U23	11	(1)
2021–	Brazil	13	(0)
Medal record
Men's football
Representing Brazil
Olympic Games
Gold medal – first place	2020 Tokyo	Team
- * Club domestic league appearances and goals as of 6 April 2026 ‡ National team caps and goals as of 25 March 2025

Guilherme Antonio Arana Lopes (born 14 April 1997), known as Guilherme Arana (Brazilian Portuguese: [ɡiˈʎɛʁmi aˈɾɐ̃nɐ]), is a Brazilian professional footballer who plays as a left-back for Campeonato Brasileiro Série A club Fluminense and the Brazil national team.

== Club career ==
=== Early career ===
Born in São Paulo, Arana was a part of Corinthians youth squads for many years, being considered one of the top prospects of the club. He won the 2014 U20 Campeonato Paulista, 2014 U20 Campeonato Brasileiro and 2015 Copa São Paulo de Futebol Júnior, also being a runner-up at the 2014 edition.

=== Corinthians ===
Arana was promoted to Corinthians' main squad after the 2014 Copa São Paulo de Futebol Júnior final and was an unused substitute in twelve matches of the 2014 Campeonato Brasileiro Série A.

Arana was part of the main squad for the 2015 Campeonato Paulista and 2015 Copa Libertadores.

==== Athlético Paranaense (loan) ====
Arana was loaned to Atlético Paranaense on 7 May 2015 for the remaining of the year as part of the squad for the 2015 Campeonato Brasileiro Série A. He made his professional debut as a substitute against Atlético Mineiro on 24 May. He was called back by Corinthians on 26 June.

==== Breakthrough ====
On 12 August 2015, Arana made his Corinthians debut as a substitute during half-time in a 4–3 win against Sport Recife at Arena Corinthians. He was directly responsible for the second goal of Sport, as he made a wrong pass that was intercepted and resulted in a goal. He compensated for the mistake by creating the opportunity that resulted in a penalty kick, which gave Corinthians the victory. He made his first league start in the away game against Avaí on 16 August. On 6 September, Arana scored his first goal in a 3–3 away draw against Corinthians' biggest rival Palmeiras.

=== Sevilla ===
On 7 December 2017, Arana transferred to Spanish club Sevilla on a deal worth 12 million euros and signed a four-and-a-half-year contract. He joined the squad upon the opening of the winter transfer window in January 2018.

==== Atalanta (loan) ====
On 28 August 2019, Arana joined Italian club Atalanta on a season-long loan with the option to buy.

=== Atlético Mineiro ===
On 29 January 2020, Arana joined Atlético Mineiro on an 18-month loan deal, which included an obligatory purchase clause.

=== Fluminense ===
On 4 January 2026, Arana joined Fluminense on a four-year contract.

== International career ==
Arana represented Brazil at the 2017 South American U-20 Championship. Arana also represented the under-23 team in 2019, playing in friendlies against South American rivals Chile and Colombia in September, ahead of the CONMEBOL Olympic Qualifying Championship in January 2020 (in which he did not take part) and the Summer Olympics originally scheduled for 2020, now being held in 2021.

On 14 November 2020, Arana received his first call-up to the full national team ahead of a 2022 World Cup qualifier against Uruguay; he was picked as an emergency replacement for Alex Telles, who had withdrawn from the squad after being diagnosed with COVID-19.

On 17 June 2021, Arana was named in the Brazil squad for the 2020 Summer Olympics.

He made his debut for the senior team on 7 October 2021 in a World Cup qualifier against Venezuela. He was left out of Brazil's squad for the 2022 FIFA World Cup due to an injury received a couple of months before the tournament, after featuring prominently at the Qualifying campaign.

== Career statistics ==
=== Club ===
As of match played 7 December 2025

Appearances and goals by club, season and competition
Club	Season	League			State league		National cup		Continental		Other		Total	
Club	Season	Division	Apps	Goals	Apps	Goals	Apps	Goals	Apps	Goals	Apps	Goals	Apps	Goals
Corinthians	2014	Série A	0	0	0	0	0	0	—		—		0	0
Corinthians	2015	Série A	12	1	0	0	0	0	0	0	—		12	1
Corinthians	2016	Série A	10	0	6	0	2	0	1 (Note: Appearance(s) in Copa Libertadores)	1	—		19	1
Corinthians	2017	Série A	32	2	14	0	5	0	3 (Note: Appearance(s) in Copa Sudamericana)	0	—		54	2
Corinthians	Total		54	3	20	0	7	0	4	1	—		85	4
Atlético Paranaense	2015	Série A	3	0	—		0	0	—		—		3	0
Sevilla	2017–18	La Liga	3	0	—		0	0	0	0	—		3	0
Sevilla	2018–19	La Liga	9	0	—		4	1	9 (Note: Appearance(s) in UEFA Europa League)	1	—		22	2
Sevilla	Total		12	0	0	0	4	1	9	1	—		25	2
Atalanta	2019–20	Serie A	4	0	—		0	0	0	0	—		4	0
Atlético Mineiro	2020	Série A	37	4	8	2	1	0	2	0	—		48	6
Atlético Mineiro	2021	Série A	26	1	7	2	6	1	10	1	—		49	5
Atlético Mineiro	2022	Série A	20	0	9	2	3	0	9	1	1 (Note: Appearance in Supercopa do Brasil)	0	42	3
Atlético Mineiro	2023	Série A	28	2	0	0	0	0	4	0	—		32	2
Atlético Mineiro	2024	Série A	17	1	11	0	10	3	13	1	—		51	5
Atlético Mineiro	2025	Série A	25	1	9	1	5	0	10	1	—		49	3
Atlético Mineiro	Total		153	9	44	7	25	4	48	4	1	0	271	24
Career total			226	12	64	7	36	5	61	6	1	0	388	30

=== International ===
As of match played 25 March 2025

Appearances and goals by national team and year
National team	Year	Apps	Goals
Brazil	2021	1	0
Brazil	2022	3	0
Brazil	2023	2	0
Brazil	2024	5	0
Brazil	2025	2	0
Total		13	0

== Honours ==
=== Club ===
Corinthians

- Campeonato Brasileiro Série A: 2015, 2017
- Campeonato Paulista: 2017

Atlético Mineiro

- Campeonato Mineiro: 2020, 2021, 2022, 2023, 2024, 2025
- Campeonato Brasileiro Série A: 2021
- Copa do Brasil: 2021
- Supercopa do Brasil: 2022

=== International ===
Brazil Olympic

- Summer Olympics: 2020

=== Individual ===
- Copa Libertadores Team of the Tournament: 2021
- Best Left-back in Brazil: 2020, 2021
- Campeonato Brasileiro Team of the Year: 2017, 2020, 2021
- Campeonato Paulista Team of the Year: 2017
- Bola de Prata: 2020, 2021
- Campeonato Mineiro Team of the Year: 2020, 2021, 2022, 2024
- South American Team of the Year: 2021
- Copa do Brasil Team of the Season: 2024
