= Dodô (footballer, born 1992) =

Brazilian footballer

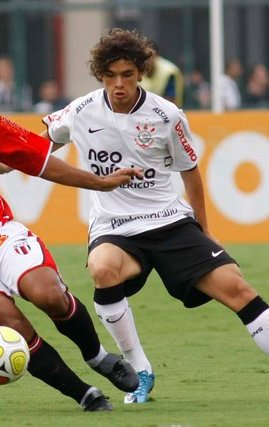
- Dodô playing for Corinthians in 2010

Personal information
- Full name: José Rodolfo Pires Ribeiro
- Date of birth: 6 February 1992 (age 34)
- Place of birth: Campinas, Brazil
- Height: 1.78 m (5 ft 10 in)
- Position: Left back

Youth career
- Guarani
- 2007–2010: Corinthians

Senior career*
| Years | Team | Apps | (Gls) |
| 2009–2012 | Corinthians | 6 | (0) |
| 2011 | → Bahia (loan) | 25 | (2) |
| 2012–2014 | Roma | 30 | (0) |
| 2014–2018 | Internazionale | 20 | (0) |
| 2016–2018 | → Sampdoria (loan) | 24 | (0) |
| 2018–2020 | Sampdoria | 0 | (0) |
| 2018 | → Santos (loan) | 42 | (1) |
| 2019 | → Cruzeiro (loan) | 22 | (0) |
| 2021–2023 | Atlético Mineiro | 46 | (2) |
| 2023–2024 | Santos | 18 | (0) |

International career^{‡}
| 2009 | Brazil U17 | ? | (1) |
- Brazil U20
- * Club domestic league appearances and goals as of 20:59, 11 December 2023 (UTC) ‡ National team caps and goals as of 30 June 2010

José Rodolfo Pires Ribeiro (born 6 February 1992), commonly known as Dodô, is a Brazilian professional footballer who plays as a left back.

== Club career ==
=== Corinthians ===
Born in Campinas, São Paulo, Dodô joined Corinthians' youth setup in 2007. In July 2009 he was promoted to the main squad by manager Mano Menezes, as a replacement to departing André Santos. He acted mainly as a backup to Roberto Carlos.

In May 2009 Dodô was linked with a future transfer to English club Manchester United to be completed in February 2010. He was spotted during the South American Under-17 championship that Brazil won.

Dodô made his first team – and Série A – debut on 15 November 2009 at the age of 17, coming on as a second-half substitute for Diego Sacoman in a 3–1 away loss against Avaí. After Mano's dismissal, he was rarely used by new managers Adílson Batista and Tite.

==== Bahia (loan) ====
In December 2010, Dodô and Corinthians teammate Boquita joined Bahia on loan for a year. He scored his first senior goal on 27 March 2011, netting the second in a 3–0 Campeonato Baiano home win against Bahia de Feira.

Dodô scored his first Série A goal on 4 September 2011, his team's second in a 3–1 away defeat of Flamengo. A regular starter during the later stages of the season, he suffered a knee injury on 16 November in a 1–0 away loss against Internacional, and was sidelined for six months.

=== Roma ===
On 2 July 2012, Dodô joined Serie A side Roma in a five-year contract. He made his debut on 28 October in a 2–3 loss against Udinese. He started the match and was later substituted for compatriot Marquinhos. He finished the season with 11 appearances.

Dodô found more first team football in the 2013–14 season, with first team left back Federico Balzaretti missing much of the season through injury. Dodô made 20 appearances in all competitions over the course of the season, helping Roma to a 2nd-place finish.

=== Internazionale ===
On 8 July 2014, it was announced that Dodô would be joining Serie A rivals Inter on a two-year loan for a fee of €1.2 million, with a conditional obligation for a fee of €7.8 million which would be activated by Dodô's first appearance in the senior team's official matches. He made his official debut with Inter on 20 August 2014 in first leg of Europa League play-off, where he scored the second goal of the 3–0 away win against Icelandic side Stjarnan. On 31 August, he debuted in Inter's first match of the 2014–15 Serie A away to Torino, playing 80 minutes at left back in a goalless draw before being substituted for Danilo D'Ambrosio.

Dodô opened the scoring in Inter's UEFA Europa League group stage match away to AS Saint-Étienne on 6 November 2014, an eventual 1–1 draw.

==== Sampdoria (loan) ====
On 21 January 2016, Dodô underwent a medical for a loan move to Sampdoria. The loan deal, set to expire on 30 June 2016, was finalized later that day.

=== Sampdoria return ===
After playing twice for Inter in 2016 pre-season under Mancini, he was left out from the squad to the United States. He did not receive any call-up from Frank de Boer either, after Mancini left the club. On 18 August 2016, Dodô returned to Sampdoria on loan with an obligation to buy in 2018.

==== Santos (loan) ====
On 22 February 2018, Dodô returned to his home country after agreeing to a one-year loan contract with Santos. He made his debut for the club on 7 March, starting in a 2–1 Campeonato Paulista away loss against Grêmio Novorizontino.

==== Cruzeiro (loan) ====
In January 2019, Dodô was loaned out to Cruzeiro until 31 December 2019 with an obligation to buy. However, the permanent move eventually collapsed as Cruzeiro was exempt from purchasing the player due to financial problems.

=== Atlético Mineiro ===
After agreeing on the termination of his contract with Sampdoria in December 2020, Dodô signed a three-year deal with Atlético Mineiro on 5 February 2021.

=== Santos return ===
On 10 July 2023, Dodô returned to Santos and signed a two-and-a-half-year contract. Despite featuring regularly after his return, he was deemed surplus to requirements after the club's first-ever relegation, and reached an agreement to rescind his link on 8 November 2024.

== International career ==
Dodô and his Inter teammate Juan Jesus were called up to the Brazil national football team for friendlies against Argentina and Japan in October 2014. They were both unused substitutes in the first match in Beijing, a 2–0 victory for the 2014 Superclásico de las Américas.

== Personal life ==
Dodô is often described as a geek, due to being a fan of video games, series, comic books and eSports.

== Career statistics ==
As of 11 December 2023

| Club | Season | League | | | State League | | Cup | | Continental | | Other | | Total | |
| Club | Season | Division | Apps | Goals | Apps | Goals | Apps | Goals | Apps | Goals | Apps | Goals | Apps | Goals |
|---|---|---|---|---|---|---|---|---|---|---|---|---|---|---|
| Corinthians | 2009 | Série A | 4 | 0 | 0 | 0 | 0 | 0 | — | | — | | 4 | 0 |
| Corinthians | 2010 | Série A | 0 | 0 | 2 | 0 | — | | 0 | 0 | — | | 2 | 0 |
| Corinthians | Total | | 4 | 0 | 2 | 0 | 0 | 0 | 0 | 0 | — | | 6 | 0 |
| Bahia (loan) | 2011 | Série A | 14 | 1 | 11 | 1 | 6 | 0 | — | | — | | 31 | 2 |
| Roma | 2012–13 | Serie A | 11 | 0 | — | | 4 | 0 | — | | — | | 15 | 0 |
| Roma | 2013–14 | Serie A | 19 | 0 | — | | 1 | 0 | — | | — | | 20 | 0 |
| Roma | Total | | 30 | 0 | — | | 5 | 0 | — | | — | | 35 | 0 |
| Inter Milan | 2014–15 | Serie A | 20 | 0 | — | | 2 | 0 | 6 (Note: All appearances in Europa League) | 2 | — | | 28 | 2 |
| Inter Milan | 2015–16 | Serie A | 0 | 0 | — | | 1 | 0 | — | | — | | 1 | 0 |
| Inter Milan | Total | | 20 | 0 | — | | 3 | 0 | 6 | 2 | — | | 29 | 2 |
| Sampdoria | 2015–16 | Serie A | 17 | 0 | — | | 0 | 0 | — | | — | | 17 | 0 |
| Sampdoria | 2016–17 | Serie A | 7 | 0 | — | | 2 | 0 | — | | — | | 9 | 0 |
| Sampdoria | 2017–18 | Serie A | 0 | 0 | — | | 0 | 0 | — | | — | | 0 | 0 |
| Sampdoria | Total | | 24 | 0 | — | | 2 | 0 | — | | — | | 26 | 0 |
| Santos (loan) | 2018 | Série A | 36 | 1 | 6 | 0 | 3 | 0 | 6 (Note: Appearance(s) in Copa Libertadores) | 0 | — | | 51 | 1 |
| Cruzeiro (loan) | 2019 | Série A | 18 | 0 | 4 | 0 | 4 | 0 | 2 | 1 | — | | 28 | 1 |
| Atlético Mineiro | 2021 | Série A | 14 | 1 | 10 | 0 | 5 | 0 | 5 | 0 | — | | 34 | 1 |
| Atlético Mineiro | 2022 | Série A | 13 | 1 | 3 | 0 | 0 | 0 | 0 | 0 | 0 | 0 | 16 | 1 |
| Atlético Mineiro | 2023 | Série A | 1 | 0 | 5 | 0 | 3 | 0 | 6 | 0 | — | | 15 | 0 |
| Atlético Mineiro | Total | | 28 | 2 | 18 | 0 | 8 | 0 | 11 | 0 | 0 | 0 | 65 | 2 |
| Santos | 2023 | Série A | 18 | 0 | — | | — | | — | | — | | 18 | 0 |
| Santos | 2024 | Série B | 0 | 0 | 0 | 0 | — | | — | | — | | 0 | 0 |
| Santos | Total | | 18 | 0 | 0 | 0 | — | | — | | — | | 18 | 0 |
| Career total | | | 192 | 4 | 41 | 1 | 31 | 0 | 25 | 3 | 0 | 0 | 289 | 8 |

== Honours ==
=== Club ===
Corinthians

- Copa do Brasil: 2009

Cruzeiro

- Campeonato Mineiro: 2019

Atlético Mineiro

- Campeonato Brasileiro Série A: 2021
- Copa do Brasil: 2021
- Campeonato Mineiro: 2021, 2022, 2023
- Supercopa do Brasil: 2022

=== International ===
Brazil U18

- Sendai Cup: 2009, 2010

Brazil U20

- South American U-20 Championship: 2009

Brazil

- Superclásico de las Américas: 2014
