= Keno (footballer) =

Brazilian footballer (born 1989)

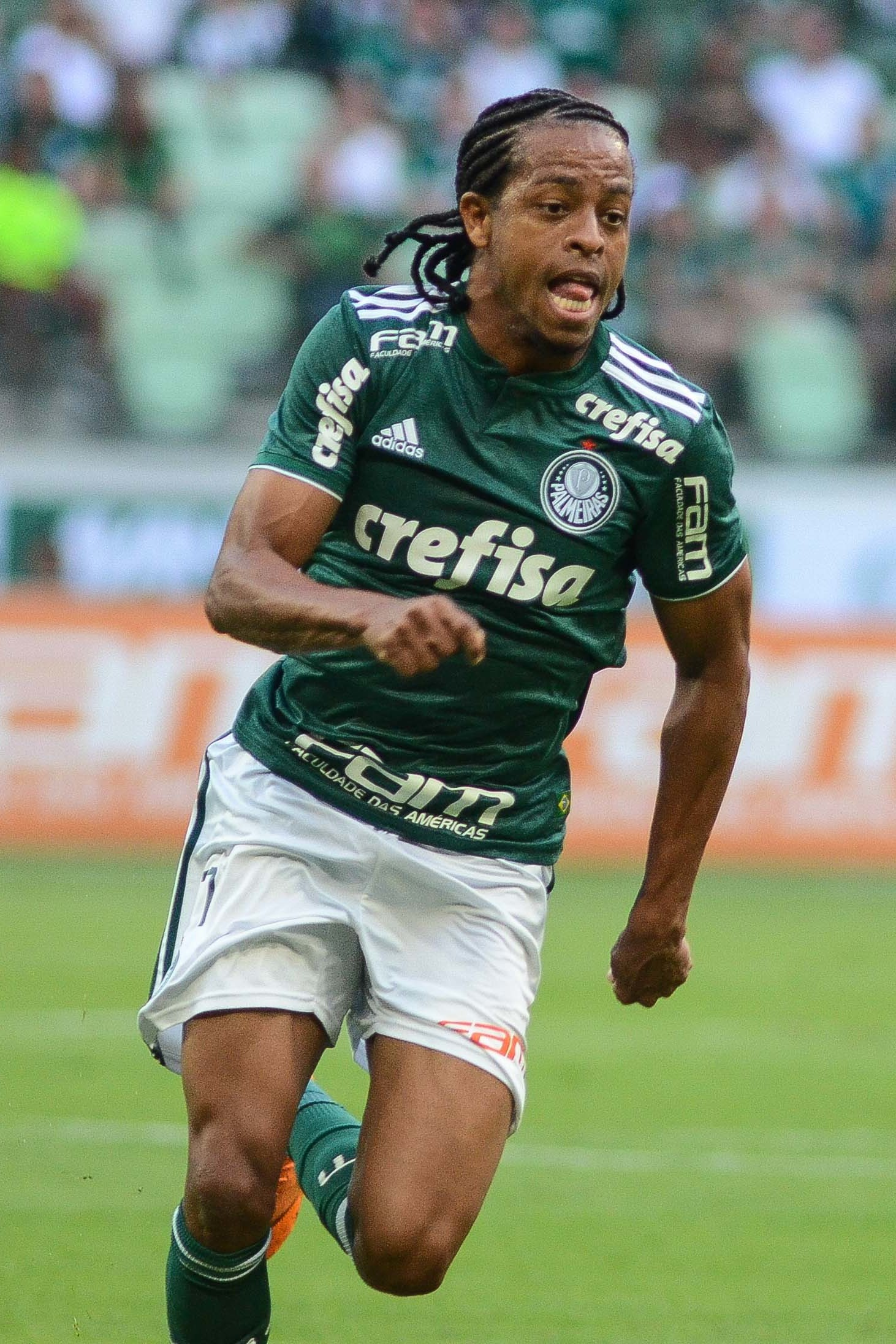
- Keno playing for Palmeiras in 2018

Personal information
- Full name: Marcos da Silva França
- Date of birth: 10 September 1989 (age 37)
- Place of birth: Salvador, Brazil
- Height: 1.79 m (5 ft 10 in)
- Position: Left winger

Team information
- Current team: Coritiba
- Number: 20

Senior career*
Years	Team	Apps	(Gls)
2009–2012	América-SE	2	(0)
2013	Botafogo-BA	15	(4)
2013	Águia de Marabá	20	(7)
2014–2016	São José-RS	0	(0)
2014	→ Paraná (loan)	12	(1)
2014	→ Santa Cruz (loan)	25	(3)
2015	→ Atlas (loan)	14	(0)
2015	→ Ponte Preta (loan)	15	(1)
2016	→ Santa Cruz (loan)	61	(18)
2017–2018	Palmeiras	83	(19)
2018–2020	Pyramids	33	(10)
2019–2020	→ Al Jazira (loan)	18	(3)
2020–2022	Atlético Mineiro	125	(25)
2023–2025	Fluminense	97	(8)
2026–	Coritiba	4	(0)
- * Club domestic league appearances and goals as of 13 December 2025

Marcos da Silva França (born 10 September 1989), commonly known as Keno, is a Brazilian footballer who plays as a left winger for Coritiba.

== Club career ==
=== Early career ===
Born in Salvador, Bahia, Keno started his career at América-SE in 2009. In 2012, he moved to hometown club Botafogo de Salvador, achieving promotion to Campeonato Baiano in his first year.

In May 2013, Keno joined Série C club Águia de Marabá, and scored seven goals during the tournament. Highlights included a brace in a 4–0 home routing of Luverdense on 11 August.

=== Paraná ===
On 4 December 2013, Keno was released by Águia as the club was immerse in a financial crisis. Twelve days later, he was announced at Paraná.

Keno made his debut for the club on 26 January 2014, coming on as a second-half substitute in a 0–2 Campeonato Paranaense away loss against rivals Coritiba. His first goal came on 5 March, the second in a 2–1 win at Toledo Colônia Work.

Keno made his professional debut on 2 May 2014, starting in a 1–1 away draw against Santa Cruz for the Série B championship. He appeared in three further matches for the club, all as a starter, before leaving due to unpaid wages.

=== Santa Cruz ===
On 14 June 2014, Keno signed for fellow second division club Santa Cruz, until the end of the year. He made his debut for the club 15 July, playing 21 minutes in a 1–4 away loss against Vasco da Gama.

Keno scored his first professional goal on 9 August 2014, netting the first in a 3–0 home success over fierce rivals Náutico. He finished the campaign with three goals in 25 appearances for Santinha, as his side finished ninth.

=== Atlas ===
On 16 December 2014, Keno agreed to a transfer to Liga MX side Club Atlas. He made his debut for the club the following 18 January, starting in a 2–1 home win against Monarcas Morelia.

Keno made his Copa Libertadores debut on 18 February 2015, playing the full 90 minutes in a 0–1 home loss against Independiente Santa Fe. He left the club with 14 appearances, but with no goals.

=== Ponte Preta ===
On 22 June 2015 Keno returned to his home country, signing for Ponte Preta. He made his debut for the club – and in the Série A – on 11 July, replacing Felipe Azevedo in a 0–2 home loss against Atlético Mineiro.

Keno made 12 league appearances for Ponte during his spell, all from the bench. His only goal for the club came on 22 July 2015, in a 2–1 Copa do Brasil home win against Coritiba; he was also sent off during the match.

=== Santa Cruz return ===
On 30 December 2015, Keno returned to his former club Santa Cruz. He made his second debut for the club the following 11 February in a 4–2 home win against América-PE, replacing Wallyson and receiving a straight red card after only three minutes on the field.

Keno helped the club to achieve both Campeonato Pernambucano and Copa do Nordeste titles during the season, netting five goals in the latter competition. He scored his first goal in the main category of Brazilian football on 15 May 2016, netting the last in a 4–1 home routing of Vitória; it was also Santa's first game in the top tier after nearly ten years.

On 18 September 2016, Keno scored a brace in a 2–3 away loss against Santos. The following weekend, he added another in a 1–3 loss at Figueirense, taking his tally up to eight goals.

=== Palmeiras ===
At the end of 2016 Palmeiras announced the signing of Keno, confirming that he will join the club in January 2017. In 40 appearances he scored 9 goals. He was often called a pass and goal machine.

=== Pyramids F.C. ===
On 25 June 2018, it was announced that Keno had agreed to transfer to Egyptian side Pyramids for a fee US$10 million. Keno became the most expensive transfer of Egyptian football, and one of the few Brazilians playing in Pyramids

=== Al Jazira Club ===
On 7 July 2019, Al-Jazira has signed Keno on a one-season loan.

=== Atlético Mineiro ===
On 18 June 2020, Atlético Mineiro announced the signing of Keno on a three-year contract, with the option of a one-year extension.

=== Fluminense ===
On 21 December 2022, Keno joined Fluminense on a two-year deal with an optional one-year extension.

== Career statistics ==
As of 10 December 2023.

Club	Season	League			State League		Cup		Continental		Other		Total	
Club	Season	Division	Apps	Goals	Apps	Goals	Apps	Goals	Apps	Goals	Apps	Goals	Apps	Goals
América-SE	2011	Sergipano	—		2	0	—		—		—		2	0
América-SE	2012	Sergipano A2	—		0	0	—		—		—		0	0
América-SE	Total		—		2	0	—		—		—		2	0
Botafogo-BA	2013	Baiano	—		15	4	—		—		—		15	4
Águia de Marabá	2013	Série C	20	7	—		—		—		—		20	7
Paraná	2014	Série B	4	0	5	1	3	0	—		—		12	1
Santa Cruz	2014	Série B	25	3	—		—		—		—		25	3
Atlas	2014–15	Liga MX	9	0	—		0	0	5 (Note: All appearance(s) in Copa Libertadores)	0	—		14	0
Ponte Preta	2015	Série A	12	0	—		1	1	2 (Note: All appearance(s) in Copa Sudamericana)	0	—		15	1
Santa Cruz	2016	Série A	34	10	11	2	2	1	3	0	11 (Note: All appearance(s) in Copa do Nordeste)	5	61	18
Palmeiras	2017	Série A	31	8	12	1	3	1	7	1	—		53	11
Palmeiras	2018	Série A	9	1	16	4	2	1	3	2	—		30	8
Palmeiras	Total		40	9	28	5	5	2	10	3	—		83	19
Pyramids	2018–19	EPL	32	8	—		1	2	—		—		33	10
Al Jazira	2019–20	UPL	12	2	—		0	0	—		4 (Note: All appearance(s) in UAE League Cup)	1	16	3
Atlético Mineiro	2020	Série A	33	10	5	1	—		—		—		38	11
Atlético Mineiro	2021	Série A	24	5	7	1	6	2	7	1	—		44	9
Atlético Mineiro	2022	Série A	29	4	8	1	2	0	3	0	1 (Note: Appearance in Supercopa do Brasil)	0	43	5
Atlético Mineiro	Total		86	19	20	3	8	2	10	1	1	0	125	25
Fluminense	2023	Série A	25	2	14	1	2	2	10	0	—		51	5
Career total			299	60	95	16	22	10	40	4	16	6	472	96

== Honours ==
Santa Cruz

- Copa do Nordeste: 2016
- Campeonato Pernambucano: 2016

Palmeiras

- Campeonato Brasileiro Série A: 2018

Atlético Mineiro

- Campeonato Brasileiro Série A: 2021
- Copa do Brasil: 2021
- Campeonato Mineiro: 2020, 2021, 2022
- Supercopa do Brasil: 2022

Fluminense

- Taça Guanabara: 2023
- Campeonato Carioca: 2023
- Copa Libertadores: 2023
- Recopa Sudamericana: 2024
