= Júnior Alonso =

Paraguayan footballer (born 1993)

- Alonso with Paraguay in 2026

Personal information
- Full name: Júnior Osmar Ignacio Alonso Mujica
- Date of birth: 9 February 1993 (age 33)
- Place of birth: Asunción, Paraguay
- Height: 1.85 m (6 ft 1 in)
- Positions: Defender; left-back

Team information
- Current team: Atlanta United
- Number: 6

Youth career
- 2011–2012: Cerro Porteño

Senior career*
Years	Team	Apps	(Gls)
2013–2016	Cerro Porteño	136	(11)
2017–2020	Lille	46	(2)
2018	→ Celta (loan)	9	(0)
2019–2020	→ Boca Juniors (loan)	21	(0)
2020–2021	Atlético Mineiro	69	(2)
2022–2024	Krasnodar	41	(1)
2022	→ Atlético Mineiro (loan)	32	(0)
2024–2026	Atlético Mineiro	68	(2)
2026–	Atlanta United	18	(0)

International career^{‡}
2013	Paraguay U-20	8	(2)
2013–	Paraguay	78	(3)
- * Club domestic league appearances and goals as of 15 November 2026 ‡ National team caps and goals as of 15 November 2026

Júnior Osmar Ignacio Alonso Mujica (born 9 February 1993) is a Paraguayan professional footballer who plays as a defender or left-back for Major League Soccer club Atlanta United and the Paraguay national team.

== Club career ==
=== Lille ===
Alonso joined French club Lille in a permanent transfer in January 2017. He made his debut for the club on 18 February 2017, coming on as a second-half substitute in a win over SM Caen. He would go on to make 56 appearances for Lille in all competitions before leaving on loan in August 2018.

==== Celta (loan) ====
On 14 August 2018, Alonso was loaned to La Liga's Celta Vigo for one year with an option to make the deal permanent.

==== Boca Juniors (loan) ====
On 2 January 2019, he was loaned to Boca Juniors. On 2 May 2019, Alonso was an unused substitute as Boca defeated Rosario Central in the 2018 Supercopa Argentina on penalty-kicks after the match ended 0–0.

=== Atlético Mineiro ===
On 2 July 2020, Alonso joined Brazilian club Atlético Mineiro on a four-year deal for a €3 million fee. He quickly became a starter on the team, and in 2021 he was champion of 2021 Campeonato Brasileiro Série A and 2021 Copa do Brasil, playing in 51 matches and scoring 1 goal, being captain and a pillar of defense.

=== Krasnodar ===
On 7 January 2022, Russian club Krasnodar announced that the terms of transfer has been agreed with Atlético Mineiro, and the terms of the 3.5-year contract has been agreed with Alonso. The contract was signed on 12 January 2022. On 3 March 2022, following the Russian invasion of Ukraine, Krasnodar announced that his contract was suspended and he would not train with the team, but the contract was not terminated and remained valid.

==== Return to Atlético Mineiro (loan) ====
On 14 March 2022, Atlético Mineiro announced the return of Alonso on loan until the end of 2022.

=== Second return to Atlético Mineiro ===
On 10 July 2024, Alonso rejoined Atlético Mineiro on a two-and-a-half-year deal.

=== Atlanta United ===
On 13 July 2026, Alonso joined Major League Soccer club Atlanta United FC through the 2028-29 season.

== International career ==
Alonso is a full international for Paraguay, having made his senior debut for his country in 2013.

In a 2018 FIFA World Cup qualifying match on 23 March 2017, Alonso scored the winning goal, and his first for the national team, in a 2–1 defeat of Ecuador.

On 29 May 2019, Alonso was selected to the final 23-man roster for the 2019 Copa América in Brazil. He would go on to start in all four of Paraguay's matches, playing every single minute, as they lost in the quarter-finals in a penalty shoot-out to hosts and eventual champions Brazil.

On 1 June 2026, he was named by head coach Gustavo Alfaro in Paraguay's 26-man squad for the 2026 FIFA World Cup.

== Career statistics ==
=== Club ===
As of match played 7 November 2026

Appearances and goals by club, season and competition
Club	Season	League			National cup (Note: Includes Coupe de France, Copa del Rey, Copa Argentina, Copa do Brasil, Russian Cup)		Continental		Other		Total	
Club	Season	Division	Apps	Goals	Apps	Goals	Apps	Goals	Apps	Goals	Apps	Goals
Cerro Porteño	2013	APF División de Honor	31	1	—		2 (Note: Appearances in Copa Sudamericana)	0	—		33	1
Cerro Porteño	2014	APF División de Honor	30	2	—		12 (Note: Eight appearances in Copa Libertadores, four appearances in Copa Sudamericana)	0	—		42	2
Cerro Porteño	2015	APF División de Honor	43	4	—		0	0	—		43	4
Cerro Porteño	2016	APF División de Honor	32	4	—		18 (Note: Eight appearances and one goal in Copa Libertadores, ten appearances in Copa Sudamericana)	1	—		50	5
Cerro Porteño	Total		136	11	—		32	1	—		168	12
Lille	2016–17	Ligue 1	12	0	2	0	—		—		14	0
Lille	2017–18	Ligue 1	34	2	2	0	—		2 (Note: Appearances in Coupe de la Ligue)	1	38	3
Lille	Total		46	2	4	0	—		2	1	52	3
Celta (loan)	2018–19	La Liga	9	0	2	0	—		—		11	0
Boca Juniors (loan)	2018–19	AFA Liga Profesional de Fútbol	7	0	2	0	2 (Note: Appearances in Copa Libertadores)	0	5 (Note: Appearance(s) in Copa de la Superliga)	0	16	0
Boca Juniors (loan)	2019–20	AFA Liga Profesional de Fútbol	14	0	0	0	2	0	1	0	17	0
Boca Juniors (loan)	Total		21	0	2	0	4	0	6	0	33	0
Atlético Mineiro	2020	Série A	32	1	—		—		6 (Note: Appearance(s) in Campeonato Mineiro)	0	38	1
Atlético Mineiro	2021	Série A	22	1	8	0	12	0	9	0	51	1
Atlético Mineiro	Total		54	2	8	0	12	0	15	0	89	2
Krasnodar	2021–22	Russian Premier League	0	0	—		—		—		0	0
Krasnodar	2022–23	Russian Premier League	12	1	7	0	—		—		19	1
Krasnodar	2023–24	Russian Premier League	29	0	6	0	—		—		35	0
Krasnodar	Total		41	1	13	0	—		—		54	1
Atlético Mineiro (loan)	2022	Série A	31	0	2	0	10	0	1	0	44	0
Atlético Mineiro	2024	Série A	12	1	8	0	7	0	—		27	1
Atlético Mineiro	2025	Série A	31	1	8	0	13	0	9	0	61	1
Atlético Mineiro	2026	Série A	10	0	0	0	4	0	5	0	19	0
Atlético Mineiro	Total		53	2	16	0	24	0	14	0	107	2
Atlanta United	2026	MLS	18	0	0	0	0	0	—		18	0
Career total			407	18	47	0	82	1	38	1	574	20

=== International ===
As of 13 November 2026

Appearances and goals by national team and year
National team	Year	Apps	Goals
Paraguay
Paraguay	2013	1	0
Paraguay	2014	5	0
Paraguay	2016	3	0
Paraguay	2017	7	1
Paraguay	2018	3	0
Paraguay	2019	9	0
Paraguay	2020	4	0
Paraguay	2021	12	1
Paraguay	2022	4	0
Paraguay	2023	4	0
Paraguay	2024	7	0
Paraguay	2025	9	1
Paraguay	2026	10	0
Total		78	3

Scores and results list Paraguay's goal tally first, score column indicates score after each Alonso goal.

List of international goals scored by Júnior Alonso
No.	Date	Venue	Opponent	Score	Result	Competition
1	23 March 2017	Estadio Defensores del Chaco, Asunción, Paraguay	Ecuador	2–0	2–1	2018 FIFA World Cup qualification
2	2 July 2021	Estádio Olímpico Pedro Ludovico, Goiânia, Brazil	Peru	2–2	3–3	2021 Copa América
3	25 March 2025	Estadio Metropolitano Roberto Meléndez, Barranquilla, Colombia	Colombia	1–2	2–2	2026 FIFA World Cup qualification

== Honours ==
Cerro Porteño

- Paraguayan Primera División: 2013 Clausura, 2015 Apertura

Boca Juniors

- Argentine Primera División: 2019–20
- Supercopa Argentina: 2018

Atlético Mineiro

- Campeonato Brasileiro Série A: 2021
- Copa do Brasil: 2021
- Campeonato Mineiro: 2020, 2021, 2022, 2025

Individual

- Bola de Prata: 2020, 2021
- Campeonato Brasileiro Série A Team of the Year: 2021
- Best Centre-back in Brazil: 2021
- South American Team of the Year: 2021
- Russian Premier League Team of the Season: 2023–24
- Campeonato Mineiro Team of the Year: 2025
- Copa Sudamericana Team of the Tournament: 2025
