= Talison =

Talison may refer to:

- Talison Minerals, defunct Australian mining company
- Talison (footballer) (born 2000), Brazilian footballer
