= Paulo Schardong =

Brazilian football coach (born 1971)

Personal information
- Full name: Paulo César Schardong
- Date of birth: 1 August 1971 (age 55)
- Place of birth: Três Passos, Brazil

Team information
- Current team: Atlético de Cajazeiras (head coach)

Managerial career
- Years: Team
- 2010: Paulistano (youth)
- 2011: União Suzano (youth)
- 2012: União Mogi (youth)
- 2013: Campinense (assistant)
- 2014: Campinense
- 2014: Castelo
- 2015: Sete de Dourados
- 2015: Flamengo-PI
- 2016: Real Ariquemes
- 2017: Ariquemes
- 2017: Villa Real Sociedad
- 2019: Ji-Paraná
- 2020: Barbalha
- 2020: Caucaia
- 2020: Democrata-GV
- 2021: Sousa
- 2021–2022: Democrata-GV
- 2022: Aymorés
- 2022: Nacional de Muriaé
- 2022: Novo Esporte
- 2023: Democrata-GV
- 2024: Carmópolis
- 2024: Sousa
- 2024: Sergipe
- 2025: Iguatu
- 2025: Patrocinense
- 2025: Boa Esporte
- 2026: CEOV
- 2026–: Atlético de Cajazeiras

Paulo César Schardong (born 1 August 1971) is a Brazilian professional football coach, currently the head coach of Atlético de Cajazeiras.

== Career ==
Born in Três Passos, Rio Grande do Sul, Schardong worked in the youth sides of Paulistano, União Suzano and União Mogi before becoming Oliveira Canindé's assistant at Campinense for the 2013 season. On 2 October 2013, after Canindé moved to CSA, he was named head coach of the Raposa for the ensuing campaign.

Despite having an unbeaten start of the season, Schardong was demoted to the assistant role on 17 January 2014, as the club opted to sign a "more experienced" coach, and left Campinense exactly one month later. He ended the year in charge of Castelo, before being appointed head coach of Sete de Dourados on 19 December.

Dismissed by Sete on 8 February 2015, Schardong was presented at Flamengo-PI on 27 July. He was named at the helm of Real Ariquemes on 5 December, before moving to neighbouring Ariquemes on 29 November 2016.

During the 2017 campaign, Schardong also had a spell as head coach of Bolivian lower league side Villa Real Sociedad. He returned to his home country on 23 November 2018, after being named in charge of Ji-Paraná, and reached the finals of the 2019 Campeonato Rondoniense with the side.

On 12 September 2019, Schardong agreed to become head coach of Barbalha for the upcoming season. Sacked the following 6 February, he took over Caucaia seven days later, but left the latter by mutual consent on 14 June 2020.

On 24 August 2020, Schardong was named head coach of Democrata-GV. He took over Sousa the following January, but resigned on 10 May 2021, after just four matches; he returned to Democrata three days later

Schardong led Democrata to a promotion from the 2021 Campeonato Mineiro Módulo II, and avoided relegation in the 2022 Campeonato Mineiro. On 4 April 2022, he was appointed Aymorés head coach, but left the club on 9 May to take over Nacional de Muriaé; he was sacked from the latter one month later.

Schardong ended the 2022 season at the helm of Novo Esporte, before returning to Democrata for the 2023 campaign. He agreed to become Carmópolis' head coach on 23 November 2023, but left the club the following 8 February to return to Sousa.

On 13 May 2024, despite winning the year's Campeonato Paraibano, Schardong asked to leave Sousa after alleging "personal reasons". Six days later, he was announced as head coach of Sergipe.

== Honours ==
Sousa

- Campeonato Paraibano: 2024
