= Talison (footballer) =

Brazilian footballer

Personal information
- Full name: Talison Ruan da Silva
- Date of birth: 2 June 2000 (age 26)
- Place of birth: Araguaína, Brazil
- Height: 1.88 m (6 ft 2 in)
- Position: Right-back

Team information
- Current team: Alverca
- Number: 4

Youth career
- –2021: PSTC
- 2016–2021: → Atlético Mineiro (loan)

Senior career*
Years	Team	Apps	(Gls)
2020–2021	PSTC	0	(0)
2020–2021	→ Atlético Mineiro (loan)	3	(0)
2021–2022	Atlético Mineiro	1	(0)
2021	→ Londrina (loan)	7	(0)
2021–2022	→ Alverca (loan)	6	(1)
2022–	Alverca	0	(0)
- * Club domestic league appearances and goals as of 1 July 2022

Talison Ruan da Silva (born 2 June 2000) is a Brazilian professional footballer who plays as a right-back for Alverca.

== Career ==
Talison joined the youth academy of Atlético Mineiro in 2016, on loan from PSTC. He received an emergency call up to the first-team squad ahead of a Série A match against Athletico Paranaense on 18 November 2020, after several players of the team had tested positive for COVID-19. He started in the match, as Atlético suffered a 2–0 home defeat.

On 9 February 2021, Talison signed for Atlético on a permanent basis, agreeing to a three-year deal. On 23 May 2021, he joined Série B club Londrina on a six-month loan.

On 26 August 2021, Talison joined Portuguese club Alverca on a season-long loan. In July 2022, he signed a permanent deal.

== Career statistics ==
As of 1 July 2022.

Club	Season	League			Cup		Continental		Other		Total	
Club	Season	Division	Apps	Goals	Apps	Goals	Apps	Goals	Apps	Goals	Apps	Goals
Atlético Mineiro	2020	Série A	3	0	—		—		—		3	0
Atlético Mineiro	2021	Série A	0	0	0	0	0	0	1 (Note: Appearance(s) in Campeonato Mineiro)	0	1	0
Atlético Mineiro	Total		3	0	0	0	0	0	1	0	4	0
Londrina (loan)	2021	Série B	7	0	—		—		—		7	0
Alverca (loan)	2021–22	Liga 3	6	1	1	0	—		1 (Note: Appearance in Promotion play-offs)	0	8	1
Career total			16	1	1	0	0	0	2	0	19	1

== Honours ==
Atlético Mineiro

- Campeonato Mineiro: 2021
- Campeonato Brasileiro Sub-20: 2020
