= Alessandro Vinícius =

Brazilian footballer (born 1999)

Personal information
- Full name: Alessandro Vinícius Gonçalves da Silva
- Date of birth: 15 February 1999 (age 27)
- Place of birth: Itabira, Brazil
- Height: 1.75 m (5 ft 9 in)
- Position: Attacking midfielder

Team information
- Current team: São José

Youth career
- –2019: Atlético Mineiro

Senior career*
Years	Team	Apps	(Gls)
2019–2023	Atlético Mineiro	7	(0)
2020	→ Criciúma (loan)	6	(0)
2021	→ São José (loan)	21	(1)
2022	→ Villa Nova (loan)	9	(0)
2022	→ Paysandu (loan)	10	(0)
2023	→ Joinville (loan)	5	(0)
2023	→ São José (loan)	19	(0)
2024–	São José	0	(0)
- * Club domestic league appearances and goals as of 1 January 2024

Alessandro Vinícius Gonçalves da Silva (born 15 February 1999), commonly known as Alessandro Vinícius, is a Brazilian footballer who plays as an attacking midfielder for Campeonato Brasileiro Série C club São José.

== Career statistics ==
=== Club ===
As of 1 January 2024.

Club	Season	League			State League		Cup		Continental		Other		Total	
Club	Season	Division	Apps	Goals	Apps	Goals	Apps	Goals	Apps	Goals	Apps	Goals	Apps	Goals
Atlético Mineiro	2019	Série A	0	0	7 (Note: Appearances in the Campeonato Mineiro)	0	0	0	0	0	—		7	0
Criciúma	2020	Série C	6	0	—		—		—		—		6	0
São José	2021	Série C	12	0	9 (Note: Appearances in the Campeonato Gaúcho)	1	—		—		—		21	1
Villa Nova	2022	Mineiro	—		9	0	—		—		—		9	0
Paysandu	2022	Série C	10	0	—		—		—		0	0	10	0
Joinville	2023	Catarinense	—		5 (Note: Appearances in the Campeonato Catarinense)	0	—		—		—		5	0
São José	2023	Série C	19	0	—		—		—		6 (Note: Appearances in the Copa FGF)	0	25	0
Career total			47	0	30	1	0	0	0	0	6	0	83	1
