= Ralph (footballer, born 1998) =

Brazilian footballer

Personal information
- Full name: Ralph Machado Dias
- Date of birth: 7 March 1998 (age 28)
- Place of birth: São Fidélis, Brazil
- Height: 1.75 m (5 ft 9 in)
- Position: Midfielder

Team information
- Current team: Lamphun Warriors
- Number: 17

Youth career
- –2018: Atlético Mineiro

Senior career*
Years	Team	Apps	(Gls)
2017–2023	Atlético Mineiro	5	(0)
2018	→ Criciúma (loan)	8	(0)
2019	→ Boavista (loan)	9	(0)
2020	→ Coimbra (loan)	4	(0)
2020	→ Ferroviária (loan)	0	(0)
2021–2022	→ Boavista (loan)	34	(2)
2022	→ Náutico (loan)	24	(0)
2023	Ypiranga	27	(0)
2024	Ferroviário	6	(0)
2024–2025	Chiangrai United	26	(0)
2025–	Lamphun Warriors	29	(1)
- * Club domestic league appearances and goals as of 10 May 2026

Ralph Machado Dias (born 7 March 1998), commonly known as Ralph, is a Brazilian footballer who plays as a midfielder for Thai League 1 club Lamphun Warriors.

== Career statistics ==
=== Club ===
As of 1 January 2024.

Club	Season	League			State league		Cup		Continental		Other		Total	
Club	Season	Division	Apps	Goals	Apps	Goals	Apps	Goals	Apps	Goals	Apps	Goals	Apps	Goals
Atlético Mineiro	2017	Série A	3	0	2 (Note: Appearances in Campeonato Mineiro)	0	1 (Note: Appearances in Copa do Brasil)	0	0	0	3 (Note: Appearances in Primeira Liga)	0	9	0
Criciúma (loan)	2018	Série B	8	0	0	0	0	0	–		0	0	8	0
Boavista (loan)	2019	Série D	5	0	4 (Note: Appearances in Campeonato Carioca)	0	0	0	–		0	0	9	0
Coimbra (loan)	2020	–			4	0	–		–		–		4	0
Ferroviária (loan)	2020	Série D	0	0	0	0	–		–		8 (Note: Appearances in Copa Paulista)	0	8	0
Boavista (loan)	2021	Série D	13	1	11	0	4	0	–		2 (Note: Appearances in Copa Rio)	0	30	1
Boavista (loan)	2022	–			10	1	–		–		–		10	1
Boavista (loan)	Total		13	1	21	1	4	0	–		2	0	40	2
Náutico (loan)	2022	Série B	22	0	2 (Note: Appearances in Campeonato Pernambucano)	0	–		–		2 (Note: Appearances in Copa do Nordeste)	0	26	0
Ypiranga	2023	Série C	16	0	11 (Note: Appearances in Campeonato Gaúcho)	0	1	0	–		–		28	0
Career total			67	1	44	1	6	0	0	0	15	0	132	2
