= Adriano Júnior =

Brazilian footballer

Personal information
- Full name: Adriano da Silva Barros Júnior
- Date of birth: 22 August 1999 (age 27)
- Place of birth: Anápolis, Brazil
- Height: 1.76 m (5 ft 9 in)
- Position: Defensive midfielder

Team information
- Current team: Cianorte

Youth career
- –2018: Atlético Goianiense
- 2018–2020: Atlético Mineiro

Senior career*
| Years | Team | Apps | (Gls) |
| 2020–2022 | Atlético Mineiro | 2 | (0) |
| 2020 | → Criciúma (loan) | 3 | (0) |
| 2021 | → Paraná (loan) | 11 | (0) |
| 2021 | → Confiança (loan) | 8 | (0) |
| 2022 | Botafogo-PB | 18 | (0) |
| 2022 | Santarritense | 5 | (1) |
| 2023– | Cianorte | 11 | (0) |
| 2023 | → Velo Clube (loan) | 2 | (0) |
| 2023 | → Portuguesa (loan) | 0 | (0) |
- * Club domestic league appearances and goals as of 01:33, 11 May 2023 (UTC)

Adriano da Silva Barros Júnior (born 22 August 1999), known as Adriano Júnior or just Adriano, is a Brazilian footballer who plays for Cianorte. Mainly a defensive midfielder, he can also play as a right back.

== Career statistics ==
As of 1 November 2023.

| Club | Season | League | | | State League | | Cup | | Continental | | Other | | Total | |
| Club | Season | Division | Apps | Goals | Apps | Goals | Apps | Goals | Apps | Goals | Apps | Goals | Apps | Goals |
|---|---|---|---|---|---|---|---|---|---|---|---|---|---|---|
| Atlético Mineiro | 2020 | Série A | 0 | 0 | 2 (Note: Appearances in the Campeonato Mineiro) | 0 | 0 | 0 | 0 | 0 | — | | 2 | 0 |
| Criciúma (loan) | 2020 | Série C | 3 | 0 | — | | — | | — | | — | | 3 | 0 |
| Paraná (loan) | 2021 | Série C | 11 | 0 | — | | — | | — | | — | | 11 | 0 |
| Confiança (loan) | 2021 | Série B | 8 | 0 | — | | — | | — | | 1 (Note: Appearances in the Copa do Nordeste) | 0 | 9 | 0 |
| Botafogo-PB | 2022 | Série C | 13 | 0 | 5 (Note: Appearances in the Campeonato Paraibano) | 0 | — | | — | | 8 | 0 | 26 | 0 |
| Santarritense | 2022 | Mineiro 2ª Divisão | — | | 5 (Note: Appearances in the Campeonato Mineiro Segunda Divisão) | 1 | — | | — | | — | | 5 | 1 |
| Cianorte | 2023 | Paranaense | — | | 11 (Note: Appearances in the Campeonato Paranaense) | 0 | — | | — | | — | | 11 | 0 |
| Velo Clube (loan) | 2023 | Paulista A2 | — | | 2 (Note: Appearances in the Campeonato Paulista Série A2) | 0 | — | | — | | — | | 2 | 0 |
| Portuguesa (loan) | 2023 | Paulista | — | | 0 | 0 | — | | — | | 10 (Note: Appearances in the Copa Paulista) | 0 | 10 | 0 |
| Career total | | | 35 | 0 | 25 | 1 | 0 | 0 | 0 | 0 | 19 | 0 | 79 | 1 |

== Honours ==
Atlético Mineiro

- Campeonato Mineiro: 2020
