= Caíque (footballer, born 3 July 2000) =

Brazilian footballer

Personal information
- Full name: Caíque Calito Fernandes Costa
- Date of birth: 3 July 2000 (age 26)
- Place of birth: São Paulo, Brazil
- Height: 1.89 m (6 ft 2 in)
- Position: Forward

Team information
- Current team: Maringá
- Number: 99

Youth career
- –2019: Francana
- 2020: Vila Nova

Senior career*
| Years | Team | Apps | (Gls) |
| 2020 | Vila Nova | 18 | (1) |
| 2020 | → CEOV Operário (loan) | 4 | (1) |
| 2021– | Tombense | 28 | (3) |
| 2021–2022 | → Porto B (loan) | 3 | (0) |
| 2023–2024 | → Aparecidense (loan) | 6 | (0) |
| 2024 | → Vila Nova (loan) | 2 | (0) |
| 2025 | → Avenida (loan) | 12 | (5) |
| 2025 | → Cianorte (loan) | 18 | (6) |
| 2026– | → Maringá (loan) | 34 | (9) |
- * Club domestic league appearances and goals as of 20 May 2023

Caíque Calito Fernandes Costa (born 3 July 2000), commonly known as Caíque, is a Brazilian footballer who plays for Maringa on loan from Tombense.

== Career statistics ==
=== Club ===
As of 10 August 2021.

| Club | Season | League | | | State League | | Cup | | Other | | Total | |
| Club | Season | Division | Apps | Goals | Apps | Goals | Apps | Goals | Apps | Goals | Apps | Goals |
|---|---|---|---|---|---|---|---|---|---|---|---|---|
| Vila Nova | 2020 | Série C | 17 | 1 | 1 (Note: Appearances in the Campeonato Goiano) | 0 | 0 | 0 | 0 | 0 | 18 | 1 |
| CEOV Operário (loan) | 2020 | Série D | 0 | 0 | 4 (Note: Appearances in the Campeonato Mato-Grossense) | 1 | 0 | 0 | 0 | 0 | 4 | 1 |
| Tombense | 2021 | Série C | 7 | 0 | 10 (Note: Appearances in the Campeonato Mineiro) | 3 | 2 (Note: Appearances in the Copa do Brasil) | 0 | 0 | 0 | 19 | 3 |
| Porto B (loan) | 2021–22 | Liga Portugal 2 | 1 | 0 | – | | – | | 0 | 0 | 1 | 0 |
| Career total | | | 25 | 1 | 15 | 4 | 2 | 0 | 0 | 0 | 42 | 5 |

== Honours ==
Tombense

- Recopa Mineira: 2020

Vila Nova

- Campeonato Brasileiro Série C: 2025

Cianorte

- Copa Paraná: 2025

Maringá

- Campeonato Brasileiro Série C: 2026
