= Michael Fracaro =

Brazilian footballer

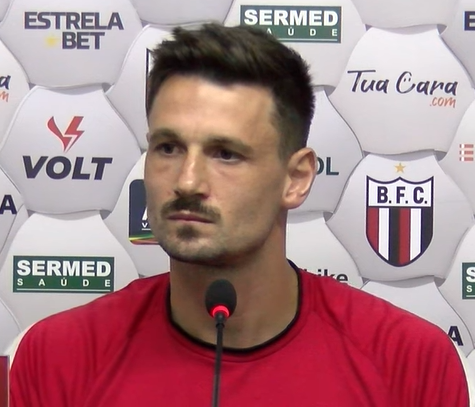
- Michael in 2024

Personal information
- Full name: Michael Matias Fracaro
- Date of birth: 8 April 1995 (age 31)
- Place of birth: Serranópolis do Iguaçu, Brazil
- Height: 1.94 m (6 ft 4 in)
- Position: Goalkeeper

Team information
- Current team: Betim
- Number: 1

Youth career
- 2010–2013: São Paulo
- 2014–2017: Atlético Mineiro

Senior career*
Years	Team	Apps	(Gls)
2016–2022	Atlético Mineiro	5	(0)
2016	→ Guarani-MG (loan)	0	(0)
2016	→ Caldense (loan)	0	(0)
2017	→ Novorizontino (loan)	7	(0)
2020–2021	→ Paços de Ferreira (loan)	2	(0)
2021	→ Confiança (loan)	6	(0)
2022	→ Alverca (loan)	4	(0)
2023	Santa Cruz	19	(0)
2023	ABC	17	(0)
2024	Botafogo-SP	15	(0)
2025–	Betim	3	(0 2025 - Botafogo-PB 2026 - Betim - MG)
- * Club domestic league appearances and goals as of 25 January 2025

Michael Matias Fracaro (born 8 April 1995), known simply as Michael, is a Brazilian footballer who plays as a goalkeeper for Betim.

== Career ==
Michael made his professional debut while on loan at Grêmio Novorizontino, replacing the club's injured starting goalkeeper Tom during the 2017 Campeonato Paulista tournament.
