= Gustavo Blanco =

Brazilian footballer (born 1994)

Personal information
- Full name: Gustavo Blanco Petersen Macedo
- Date of birth: 3 October 1994 (age 32)
- Place of birth: Salvador, Brazil
- Height: 1.74 m (5 ft 9 in)
- Position: Central midfielder

Youth career
- 2011–2014: Bahia

Senior career*
Years	Team	Apps	(Gls)
2015–2018	Bahia	22	(1)
2017	→ América Mineiro (loan)	15	(0)
2017–2018	→ Atlético Mineiro (loan)	23	(0)
2018–2022	Atlético Mineiro	6	(0)
2020–2021	→ Goiás (loan)	5	(0)
2021	→ Fortaleza (loan)	3	(0)
2022	→ Londrina (loan)	5	(0)
2022	→ Vitória (loan)	0	(0)
- * Club domestic league appearances and goals as of 31 December 2022

Gustavo Blanco Petersen Macedo, known simply as Gustavo Blanco (born 3 October 1994), is a Brazilian professional footballer who plays as a central midfielder. He currently does not play for any club.

== Career ==
Born in Salvador, Bahia, Blanco joined Esporte Clube Bahia aged 16 and was promoted to the senior team in early 2015. He made 13 appearances in the Série B during his first professional season.

On 23 December 2016, Blanco was loaned to América Mineiro on a season-long deal. However, his performances in the 2017 Campeonato Mineiro campaign caught the eye of rivals Atlético Mineiro, who signed him on 3 July 2017 on a loan deal that included a buyout clause. He spent his first season at Atlético as a substitute, totaling eight appearances in all competitions.

Blanco made his first team breakthrough at the start of the 2018 Série A season, drawing praise from fans and critics for his passing and defensive qualities, as well as for his high work rate on the pitch. On 21 May 2018, Atlético acquired him permanently on a four-year deal. On 2 July 2018, he suffered an ACL injury in his left knee which sidelined him for 22 months. He returned to training in May 2020, and in October joined Goiás on loan for the remainder of the 2020 Série A season. He made his first appearance in over two years on 14 November, in a 1–0 league defeat to Athletico Paranaense.

On 15 March 2021, Blanco joined Fortaleza on loan for the remainder of the season.

== Career statistics ==
As of 31 December 2022.

Club	Season	League			State League		Cup		Continental		Other		Total	
Club	Season	Division	Apps	Goals	Apps	Goals	Apps	Goals	Apps	Goals	Apps	Goals	Apps	Goals
Bahia	2015	Série B	13	1	—		2	0	2 (Note: Appearance(s) in Copa Sudamericana)	0	—		17	1
Bahia	2016	Série B	6	0	3	0	2	0	—		2 (Note: Appearance(s) in Copa do Nordeste)	0	13	0
Bahia	Total		19	1	3	0	4	0	2	0	2	0	30	1
América Mineiro	2017	Série B	4	0	11	0	2	0	—		2 (Note: Appearance(s) in Primeira Liga)	0	19	0
Atlético Mineiro	2017	Série A	8	0	—		—		—		—		8	0
Atlético Mineiro	2018	Série A	11	0	10	0	5	1	2	0	—		28	1
Atlético Mineiro	2019	Série A	0	0	0	0	0	0	0	0	—		0	0
Atlético Mineiro	2020	Série A	0	0	0	0	0	0	0	0	—		0	0
Atlético Mineiro	Total		19	0	10	0	5	1	2	0	—		36	1
Goiás	2020	Série A	4	0	1	0	—		—		—		5	0
Fortaleza	2021	Série A	0	0	3	0	0	0	—		3	0	6	0
Londrina	2022	Série B	—		5	0	1	0	—		—		6	0
Vitória	2022	Série C	0	0	0	0	—		—		—		0	0
Career total			46	1	33	0	12	1	4	0	7	0	102	2

== Honours ==
Bahia

- Campeonato Baiano: 2015

América Mineiro

- Campeonato Brasileiro Série B: 2017

Atlético Mineiro

- Campeonato Mineiro: 2020

Fortaleza

- Campeonato Cearense: 2021
