= 2022 Supercopa do Brasil =

5th Supercopa do Brasil, annual football match

Atlético Mineiro	Flamengo
(Minas Gerais)	(Rio de Janeiro (state))
2	2
- Atlético Mineiro won 8–7 on penalties
- Date: 20 February 2022
- Venue: Arena Pantanal, Cuiabá
- Man of the Match: Hulk (Atlético Mineiro)
- Referee: Anderson Daronco (Rio Grande do Sul)
- Attendance: 32,028

The 2022 Supercopa do Brasil (officially the Supercopa Kia 2022 for sponsorship reasons) was the fifth edition of Supercopa do Brasil, an annual football match played between the champions of the Campeonato Brasileiro Série A and Copa do Brasil.

The match was played on 20 February 2022 between Atlético Mineiro, winners of the 2021 Campeonato Brasileiro Série A and the 2021 Copa do Brasil and Flamengo, runners-up of the 2021 Campeonato Brasileiro Série A.

On 26 January 2022, the Federação de Futebol do Distrito Federal announced that the match would be hosted at Arena BRB Mané Garrincha in Brasília, however one day later the Governo do Distrito Federal banned fans from venues in the state following the spread of the COVID-19. Due to this inconvenience, on 8 February 2022, CBF decided to move the match to Arena Pantanal in Cuiabá.

Tied 2–2, Atlético Mineiro won 8–7 on penalties to win their first title in the tournament.

== Qualified teams ==
Team	Qualification	Previous appearances (bold indicates winners)
(Minas Gerais) Atlético Mineiro	2021 Campeonato Brasileiro Série A champions and 2021 Copa do Brasil champions	None
(Rio de Janeiro (state)) Flamengo	2021 Campeonato Brasileiro Série A runners-up	3 (1991, **2020**, **2021**)

== Match ==
=== Details ===
20 February 2022
16:00 UTC–3

Atlético Mineiro (Minas Gerais)	2–2	(Rio de Janeiro (state)) Flamengo
Fernández 42'; Hulk 74'	Report	Gabriel 55'; Bruno Henrique 64'
Penalties
Hulk (penalty scored); Fernández (penalty scored); Ademir (penalty scored); Guilherme Arana (penalty scored); Vargas (penalty scored); Guga (penalty missed); Jair (penalty scored); Everson (penalty missed); Nathan Silva (penalty scored); Mariano (penalty missed); Godín (penalty missed); Hulk (penalty scored)	8–7	(penalty scored) Lázaro; (penalty scored) Vitinho; (penalty scored) Diego; (penalty scored) David Luiz; (penalty scored) Gabriel; (penalty missed) Willian Arão; (penalty scored) João Gomes; (penalty missed) Matheuzinho; (penalty scored) Léo Pereira; (penalty missed) Fabrício Bruno; (penalty missed) Hugo Souza; (penalty missed) Vitinho

Arena Pantanal, Cuiabá
Attendance: 32,028
Referee: Anderson Daronco (Rio Grande do Sul)

**Atlético Mineiro**	**Flamengo**

GK	22	(Brazil) Everson
DF	25	(Brazil) Mariano	(yellow card) 45+1'
DF	40	(Brazil) Nathan Silva	(yellow card) 33'
DF	3	(Uruguay) Diego Godín
DF	13	(Brazil) Guilherme Arana
MF	8	(Brazil) Jair	(yellow card) 54'
MF	29	(Brazil) Allan		(substituted off) 90+4'
MF	26	(Argentina) Ignacio Fernández
FW	17	(Venezuela) Jefferson Savarino		(substituted off) 73'
FW	7	(Brazil) Hulk (c)
FW	11	(Brazil) Keno		(substituted off) 73'
Substitutes:
GK	32	(Brazil) Rafael
DF	2	(Brazil) Guga		(substituted in) 90+4'
DF	4	(Brazil) Réver
DF	6	(Brazil) Dodô
DF	16	(Brazil) Igor Rabello
MF	5	(Brazil) Otávio
MF	27	(Brazil) Calebe
MF	30	(Colombia) Dylan Borrero
MF	37	(Brazil) Tchê Tchê
FW	10	(Chile) Eduardo Vargas		(substituted in) 73'
FW	18	(Brazil) Eduardo Sasha
FW	19	(Brazil) Ademir		(substituted in) 73'
Manager:
(Argentina) Antonio Mohamed

GK	45	(Brazil) Hugo Souza
DF	15	(Brazil) Fabrício Bruno
DF	23	(Brazil) David Luiz	(yellow card) 90+2'
DF	16	(Brazil) Filipe Luís		(substituted off) 82'
MF	22	(Brazil) Rodinei		(substituted off) 82'
MF	35	(Brazil) João Gomes	(yellow card) 79'
MF	5	(Brazil) Willian Arão
MF	14	(Uruguay) Giorgian De Arrascaeta		(substituted off) 82'
MF	7	(Brazil) Éverton Ribeiro (c)		(substituted off) 61'
FW	27	(Brazil) Bruno Henrique		(substituted off) 71'
FW	9	(Brazil) Gabriel	(yellow card) 55'
Substitutes:
GK	1	(Brazil) Diego Alves
DF	4	(Brazil) Léo Pereira		(substituted in) 82'
DF	6	(Brazil) Renê
DF	34	(Brazil) Matheuzinho		(substituted in) 82'
DF	41	(Brazil) Gabriel Noga
DF	44	(Chile) Mauricio Isla
MF	10	(Brazil) Diego		(substituted in) 71'
MF	18	(Brazil) Andreas Pereira
FW	11	(Brazil) Vitinho		(substituted in) 82'
FW	13	(Brazil) Lázaro		(substituted in) 61'
FW	21	(Brazil) Pedro
FW	31	(Brazil) Marinho
Manager:
(Portugal) Paulo Sousa

Man of the Match:
(Brazil) Hulk (Atlético Mineiro)
Assistant referees:
Danilo Ricardo Simon Manis (São Paulo)
Bruno Raphael Pires (Goiás)
Fourth official:
Bráulio da Silva Machado (Santa Catarina)
Fifth official:
Leone Carvalho Rocha (Goiás)
Video assistant referee:
Daniel Nobre Bins (Rio Grande do Sul)
Assistant video assistant referees:
André da Silva Bitencourt (Rio Grande do Sul)

**Match rules**

- 90 minutes.
- Penalty shoot-out if scores still level.
- Twelve named substitutes.
- Maximum of five substitutions.

2022 Supercopa do Brasil winners
**Atlético Mineiro**
**1st title**
