= 2021 Campeonato Mineiro =

Football championship of Minas Gerais, Brazil

Campeonato Mineiro
- Season: 2021
- Dates: 27 February – 22 May
- Champions: Atlético Mineiro
- Relegated: Boa Esporte; Coimbra
- Matches: 75
- Goals: 154 (2.05 per match)
- Top goalscorer: Rodolfo (7 goals)

The 2021 Campeonato Mineiro (officially Campeonato Mineiro SICOOB 2021 – Módulo I for sponsorship reasons) was the 107th edition of the state championship of Minas Gerais organized by the FMF. The competition began on 27 February and ended on 22 May 2021.

Due to the worsening of the COVID-19 pandemic in Brazil, FMF suspended the Campeonato Mineiro between 22 and 31 March 2021. The tournament resumed on 1 April 2021.

The defending champions Atlético Mineiro successfully defended their title winning their 46th Campeonato Mineiro.

== Format ==
=== First stage ===
The 2021 Módulo I first stage was contested by 12 clubs in a single round-robin tournament. The four best-placed teams qualified for the final stage and the bottom two teams were relegated to the 2022 Módulo II.

The three best-placed teams not already qualified for the 2022 seasons of the Série A, Série B or Série C, gained berths in the 2022 Série D. The four best-placed teams qualified for the 2022 Copa do Brasil. If a team qualified for the Copa do Brasil by other means, its berth would be awarded to the Troféu Inconfidência champions.

=== Knockout stage ===
The knockout stage was played between the 4 best-placed teams from the previous stage in a two-legged tie. In the semifinals and finals, higher-seeded team earned the right to choose the order of the legs. The away goals rule would not be used, and if two teams tied on aggregate goals, higher-seeded team would advance.

=== Troféu Inconfidência ===
The Troféu Inconfidência was played between the 5th to 8th-placed teams from the previous stage. Originally, the Troféu Inconfidência would be played in a two-legged tie but, following an agreement with FMF, the qualified teams decided to play in a single-leg tie. In the semifinals and final, higher-seeded team hosted the leg. If the score was level, the match would go straight to the penalty shoot-out to determine the winners.

== Participating teams ==
Locations of the 2021 Campeonato Mineiro teams

Team	Home city	Manager	2020 result
América Mineiro	Belo Horizonte	Lisca	3rd
Athletic Club	São João del-Rei	Gustavo Brancão	2nd (Módulo II)
Atlético Mineiro	Belo Horizonte	Cuca	1st
Boa Esporte	Varginha	Luiz Gabardo	7th
Caldense	Poços de Caldas	Marcus Paulo Grippi	4th
Coimbra	Contagem	Eugênio Souza	10th
Cruzeiro	Belo Horizonte	Felipe Conceição	6th
Patrocinense	Patrocínio	Rogério Henrique	8th
Pouso Alegre	Pouso Alegre	Emerson Ávila	1st (Módulo II)
Tombense	Tombos	Rafael Guanaes	2nd
Uberlândia	Uberlândia	Waguinho Dias	5th
URT	Patos de Minas	Wellington Fajardo	9th

== First stage ==
Pos	Team	Pld	W	D	L	GF	GA	GD	Pts	Qualification or relegation
1	Atlético Mineiro	11	9	0	2	23	7	+16	27	Knockout stage
2	América Mineiro	11	7	1	3	17	9	+8	22	Knockout stage
3	Cruzeiro	11	6	2	3	12	4	+8	20	Knockout stage
4	Tombense	11	5	5	1	16	9	+7	20	Knockout stage
5	URT	11	5	1	5	8	16	−8	16	Troféu Inconfidência
6	Pouso Alegre	11	4	3	4	13	10	+3	15	Troféu Inconfidência
7	Caldense	11	4	3	4	10	12	−2	15	Troféu Inconfidência
8	Athletic Club	11	4	1	6	9	10	−1	13	Troféu Inconfidência
9	Uberlândia	11	3	3	5	13	19	−6	12	
10	Patrocinense	11	2	4	5	7	15	−8	10	
11	Boa Esporte (R)	11	2	2	7	8	14	−6	8	2022 Módulo II
12	Coimbra (R)	11	1	3	7	4	15	−11	6	2022 Módulo II

Source: FMF
Rules for classification: 1) Points; 2) Wins; 3) Goal difference; 4) Goals scored; 5) Head-to-head results (only if two teams are tied); 6) Fewest red cards received; 7) Fewest yellow cards received; 8) Draw.
(R) Relegated

== Troféu Inconfidência ==
=== Bracket ===
Semi-finals
5	URT (p)	1 (3)
8	Athletic Club	1 (2)
6	Pouso Alegre (p)	0 (6)
7	Caldense	0 (5)

Final
5	URT	0 (2)
6	Pouso Alegre (p)	0 (4)

== Knockout stage ==
=== Bracket ===
Semi-finals
3	Cruzeiro	1	1	2
2	América Mineiro	2	3	5
4	Tombense	0	1	1
1	Atlético Mineiro	3	1	4

Finals
2	América Mineiro	0	0	0
1	Atlético Mineiro	0	0	0

=== Semi-finals ===
==== Group F ====
1 May 2021
16:30

Tombense	0–3	Atlético Mineiro
	Report	Hyoran 15'; Guga 21' (pen.); Hulk 61'

Estádio Independência, Belo Horizonte
Attendance: 0
Referee: Wanderson Alves de Souza

8 May 2021
16:30

Atlético Mineiro	1–1	Tombense
Eduardo Sasha 7'	Report	Caíque 78'

Mineirão, Belo Horizonte
Attendance: 0
Referee: Paulo César Zanovelli da Silva

Atlético Mineiro advanced to the finals.

==== Group G ====
2 May 2021
16:00

Cruzeiro	1–2	América Mineiro
Rafael Sóbis 37'	Report	Alê 85'; Ademir 90'

Mineirão, Belo Horizonte
Attendance: 0
Referee: Marco Aurélio Augusto Fazekas Ferreira

9 May 2021
16:00

América Mineiro	3–1	Cruzeiro
Rodolfo 45+2' (pen.), 71' (pen.); Ramon 90+5'	Report	Matheus Barbosa 62'

Estádio Independência, Belo Horizonte
Attendance: 0
Referee: Felipe Fernandes de Lima

América Mineiro advanced to the finals.

=== Finals ===
16 May 2021
16:00

América Mineiro	0–0	Atlético Mineiro
	Report

Estádio Independência, Belo Horizonte
Attendance: 0
Referee: Wanderson Alves de Souza

22 May 2021
16:30

Atlético Mineiro	0–0	América Mineiro
	Report

Mineirão, Belo Horizonte
Attendance: 0
Referee: Felipe Fernandes de Lima

Tied 0–0 on aggregate, Atlético Mineiro were declared champions due to their best performance in the first stage.

== Top goalscorers ==
Rank	Player	Club	Goals
1	Rodolfo	América Mineiro	7
2	Keké	Tombense	6
3	Daniel Amorim	Tombense	5
4	Jefferson	Boa Esporte	4
5	Caíque	Tombense	3
5	Ignacio Fernández	Atlético Mineiro	3
5	João Diogo	URT	3
5	Marrony	Atlético Mineiro	3
5	Paulo Henrique	Pouso Alegre	3
5	Reis	Uberlândia	3
5	Eduardo Vargas	Atlético Mineiro	3
5	William Pottker	Cruzeiro	3
