= 2022 Campeonato Mineiro =

Football championship of Minas Gerais, Brazil

Campeonato Mineiro
- Season: 2022
- Dates: 26 January – 3 April
- Champions: Atlético Mineiro
- Relegated: Uberlândia; URT
- Matches: 75
- Goals: 170 (2.27 per match)
- Top goalscorer: Hulk (10 goals)

The 2022 Campeonato Mineiro (officially Campeonato Mineiro SICOOB 2022 – Módulo I for sponsorship reasons) was the 108th edition of the state championship of Minas Gerais organized by the FMF. The competition started on 26 January and ended on 3 April 2022.

Atlético Mineiro successfully defended its bi-championship and earned the 47th title.

== Format ==
=== First stage ===
The 2022 Módulo I first stage was contested by 12 clubs in a single round-robin tournament. The four best-placed teams qualified for the final stage and the bottom two teams will be relegated to the 2023 Módulo II.

The three best-placed teams not already qualified for the 2023 seasons of the Série A, Série B or Série C, gained berths in the Série D. The four best-placed teams qualified for the 2023 Copa do Brasil. If a team qualified for the Copa do Brasil by other means, its berth would be awarded to the Troféu Inconfidência champions.

=== Knockout stage ===
The knockout phase will be played between the 4 best placed teams from the previous phase in a two-legged tie in the semi-finals, where the team with the best seed will win the right to choose the order of the legs. The final, from this edition onwards, will take place in a single match on neutral ground. The away goals rule will not be used, and if two teams tied for higher aggregate goals, the highest ranked team would advance.

=== Troféu Inconfidência ===
The Inconfidência Trophy will be disputed between the teams from 5th to 8th placed in the previous phase. The semi-finals will be two-handed tie and the final will be played in a single game.

== Participating teams ==
Locations of the 2022 Campeonato Mineiro teams

Team	Home city	Manager	2021 result
América Mineiro	Belo Horizonte	Marquinhos Santos	2nd
Athletic Club	São João del-Rei	Roger	8th
Atlético Mineiro	Belo Horizonte	Antonio Mohamed	1st
Caldense	Poços de Caldas	Gian Rodrigues	7th
Cruzeiro	Belo Horizonte	Paulo Pezzolano	3rd
Democrata-GV	Governador Valadares	Paulo Schardong	2nd (Módulo II)
Patrocinense	Patrocínio	Max Sandro	10th
Pouso Alegre	Pouso Alegre	Francisco Diá	6th
Tombense	Tombos	Rafael Guanaes	4th
Uberlândia	Uberlândia	Paulo Foiani	9th
URT	Patos de Minas	Paulo Cezar Catanoce	5th
Villa Nova	Nova Lima	Cícero Júnior	1st (Módulo II)

== First stage ==
Pos	Team	Pld	W	D	L	GF	GA	GD	Pts	Qualification or relegation
1	Atlético Mineiro	11	9	1	1	23	5	+18	28	Knockout stage
2	Athletic Club	11	8	1	2	15	4	+11	25	Knockout stage
3	Cruzeiro	11	7	1	3	21	11	+10	22	Knockout stage
4	Caldense	11	6	0	5	12	13	−1	18	Knockout stage
5	América Mineiro	11	5	2	4	11	8	+3	17	Troféu Inconfidência
6	Villa Nova	11	3	6	2	13	10	+3	15	Troféu Inconfidência
7	Democrata GV	11	4	2	5	10	10	0	14	Troféu Inconfidência
8	Tombense	11	3	2	6	8	13	−5	11	Troféu Inconfidência
9	Patrocinense	11	3	1	7	7	16	−9	10	
10	Pouso Alegre	11	2	3	6	11	19	−8	9	
11	Uberlândia	11	2	3	6	6	16	−10	9	2023 Módulo II
12	URT	11	1	4	6	6	18	−12	7	2023 Módulo II

Source: FMF
Rules for classification: 1) Points; 2) Wins; 3) Goal difference; 4) Goals scored; 5) Head-to-head results (only if two teams are tied); 6) Fewest red cards received; 7) Fewest yellow cards received; 8) Draw.

== Troféu Inconfidência ==
=== Bracket ===
Semi-finals
6	Villa Nova	2	1	3
7	Democrata GV	1	3	4
5	América Mineiro	1	1	2
8	Tombense	3	1	4

Final
7	Democrata GV	1	—	1
8	Tombense	0	—	0

== Knockout stage ==
=== Bracket ===
Semi-finals
4	Caldense	0	0	0
1	Atlético Mineiro	2	3	5
3	Cruzeiro	2	2	4
2	Athletic Club	0	1	1

Final
1	Atlético Mineiro	3	—	3
3	Cruzeiro	1	—	1

=== Semi-finals ===
==== Group F ====
23 March 2022
16:30

Caldense	0–2	Atlético Mineiro
	Report	Hulk 27', 40' (pen.)

Mineirão, Belo Horizonte
Referee: André Luis
27 March 2022
18:00

Atlético Mineiro	3–0	Caldense
Sasha 20'; Keno 29'; Ademir 65'	Report

Mineirão, Belo Horizonte
Referee: Ricardo Marques Ribeiro

==== Group G ====
22 March 2022
20:30

Cruzeiro	2–0	Athletic Club
Eduardo Brock 7'; Edu 49'	Report

Mineirão, Belo Horizonte
Referee: Felipe Fernandes de Lima
26 March 2022
16:30

Athletic Club	1–2	Cruzeiro
Rafhael Lucas 43' (pen.)	Report	João Paulo 36'; Vitor Roque 45'

Mineirão, Belo Horizonte
Referee: Marco Aurélio Augusto Fazekas Pereira

=== Final ===
2 April 2022
16:30

Atlético Mineiro	3–1	Cruzeiro
Hulk 31', 81' (pen.); Fernández 65'	Report	Edu 90'

Mineirão, Belo Horizonte
Referee: Felipe Fernandes de Lima

Atlético Mineiro	Cruzeiro

== Top goalscorers ==
Rank	Player	Club	Goal
1	(Brazil) Hulk	Atlético Mineiro	10
2	(Brazil) Edu	Cruzeiro	7
2	(Brazil) Ciel	Tombense	7
4	(Brazil) Rafhael Lucas	Athletic Club	6
5	(Brazil) João Diogo	Caldense	5
5	(Brazil) Eduardo Sasha	Atlético Mineiro	5
