= 2021 Campeonato Brasileiro Série A =

Football league

Campeonato Brasileiro Série A
- Season: 2021
- Dates: 29 May – 9 December 2021
- Champions: Atlético Mineiro (3rd title)
- Relegated: Grêmio; Bahia; Sport; Chapecoense
- Copa Libertadores: Atlético Mineiro; Flamengo; Palmeiras (via Copa Libertadores); Fortaleza; Corinthians; Red Bull Bragantino; Fluminense; América Mineiro; Athletico Paranaense (via Copa Sudamericana)
- Copa Sudamericana: Atlético Goianiense; Santos; Ceará; Internacional; São Paulo; Cuiabá
- Matches: 380
- Goals: 842 (2.22 per match)
- Top goalscorer: Hulk (19 goals)
- Biggest home win: Fortaleza 5–1 Internacional (6 June); Fortaleza 4–0 América Mineiro (7 July); Flamengo 5–1 São Paulo (25 July); Palmeiras 4–0 Atlético-GO (10 November)
- Biggest away win: Bahia 0–5 Flamengo (18 July)
- Highest scoring: Bahia 3–4 América Mineiro (30 June); Internacional 5–2 Chapecoense (10 October); Atlético-MG 4–3 RB Bragantino (5 December); Grêmio 4–3 Atlético-MG (9 December)
- Longest winning run: 9 games Atlético Mineiro
- Longest unbeaten run: 18 games Atlético Mineiro
- Longest winless run: 19 games Chapecoense
- Longest losing run: 8 games Chapecoense

The 2021 Campeonato Brasileiro Série A (officially the Brasileirão Assaí 2021 for sponsorship reasons) was the 65th season of the Campeonato Brasileiro Série A, the top level of professional football in Brazil, and the 19th edition in a double round-robin since its establishment in 2003. The competition began on 29 May and ended on 9 December 2021. Flamengo were the defending champions.

The top six teams as well as the 2021 Copa do Brasil champions qualified for the Copa Libertadores. The next six best-placed teams not qualified for Copa Libertadores qualified for the Copa Sudamericana and the last four were relegated to Série B for 2022.

Atlético Mineiro were the champions, winning their third Série A title on 2 December 2021 with two matches to spare after they defeated Bahia by a 3–2 score.

== Teams ==
Location of teams in 2021 Série A

Twenty teams compete in the league – the top sixteen teams from the previous season, as well as four teams promoted from the Série B.

América Mineiro and Chapecoense became the first two clubs to be promoted on 12 January 2021 after a 0–0 draw against Náutico and a 2–1 win against Figueirense, respectively. Chapecoense had an immediate return to the first division after a season away, while América Mineiro returned after a two-year absence. Cuiabá was promoted for the first time ever on 22 January 2021. The final team to achieve promotion were Juventude on 29 January 2021, sealing a return to the top flight after a thirteen-year absence.

Pos.	Relegated from 2020 Série A
17th	Vasco da Gama
18th	Goiás
19th	Coritiba
20th	Botafogo

Pos.	Promoted from 2020 Série B
1st	Chapecoense
2nd	América Mineiro
3rd	Juventude
4th	Cuiabá

=== Number of teams by state ===
Number of teams	State	Team(s)
5	São Paulo	Corinthians, Palmeiras, Red Bull Bragantino, Santos and São Paulo
3	Rio Grande do Sul	Grêmio, Juventude and Internacional
2	Ceará	Ceará and Fortaleza
2	Minas Gerais	América Mineiro and Atlético Mineiro
2	Rio de Janeiro	Flamengo and Fluminense
1	Bahia	Bahia
1	Goiás	Atlético Goianiense
1	Mato Grosso	Cuiabá
1	Paraná	Athletico Paranaense
1	Pernambuco	Sport
1	Santa Catarina	Chapecoense

=== Stadiums and locations ===
Team	Location	State	Stadium	Capacity
América Mineiro	Belo Horizonte	Minas Gerais	Independência	23,018
Athletico Paranaense	Curitiba	Paraná	Arena da Baixada	42,372
Atlético Goianiense	Goiânia	Goiás	Antônio Accioly	12,500
Atlético Mineiro	Belo Horizonte	Minas Gerais	Mineirão	61,846
Bahia	Salvador	Bahia	Fonte Nova	47,907
Ceará	Fortaleza	Ceará	Castelão	63,903
Chapecoense	Chapecó	Santa Catarina	Arena Condá	20,089
Corinthians	São Paulo	São Paulo	Neo Química Arena	47,605
Cuiabá	Cuiabá	Mato Grosso	Arena Pantanal	44,000
Flamengo	Rio de Janeiro	Rio de Janeiro	Maracanã	78,838
Fluminense	Rio de Janeiro	Rio de Janeiro	Maracanã	78,838
Fortaleza	Fortaleza	Ceará	Castelão	63,903
Grêmio	Porto Alegre	Rio Grande do Sul	Arena do Grêmio	55,225
Internacional	Porto Alegre	Rio Grande do Sul	Beira-Rio	50,128
Juventude	Caxias do Sul	Rio Grande do Sul	Alfredo Jaconi	19,924
Palmeiras	São Paulo	São Paulo	Allianz Parque	43,713
Red Bull Bragantino	Bragança Paulista	São Paulo	Nabi Abi Chedid	17,128
Santos	Santos	São Paulo	Vila Belmiro	16,068
São Paulo	São Paulo	São Paulo	Morumbi	72,039
Sport	Recife	Pernambuco	Ilha do Retiro	32,983

== Personnel and kits ==
Team	Manager	Captain	Kit manufacturer	Shirt main sponsor
América Mineiro	(Brazil) Marquinhos Santos	(Brazil) Juninho	Volt Sport	Pixbet
Athletico Paranaense	(Brazil) Alberto Valentim	(Brazil) Thiago Heleno	Umbro	Neodent
Atlético Goianiense	(Brazil) Marcelo Cabo	(Brazil) Fernando Miguel	Dragão Premium (club manufactured kit)	Amuletobet
Atlético Mineiro	(Brazil) Cuca	(Brazil) Réver	Le Coq Sportif	Betano
Bahia	(Brazil) Guto Ferreira	(Brazil) Lucas Fonseca	Esquadrão (club manufactured kit)	Casa de Apostas
Ceará	(Brazil) Tiago Nunes	(Brazil) Luiz Otávio	Vozão (club manufactured kit)	Zenir
Chapecoense	(Brazil) Felipe Endres (caretaker)	(Brazil) Moisés Ribeiro	Umbro	Aurora Coop
Corinthians	(Brazil) Sylvinho	(Brazil) Cássio	Nike	Vitaminas Neo Química
Cuiabá	(Brazil) Jorginho	(Brazil) Anderson Conceição	Umbro	Drebor
Flamengo	(Brazil) Maurício Souza (caretaker)	(Brazil) Diego	Adidas	Banco BRB
Fluminense	(Brazil) Marcão	(Brazil) Fred	Umbro	Betano
Fortaleza	(Argentina) Juan Pablo Vojvoda	(Brazil) Tinga	Leão1918 (club manufactured kit)	Zenir
Grêmio	(Brazil) Vagner Mancini	(Brazil) Pedro Geromel	Umbro	Banrisul
Internacional	(Uruguay) Diego Aguirre	(Brazil) Taison	Adidas	Banrisul
Juventude	(Brazil) Jair Ventura	(Brazil) William Matheus	19treze (club manufactured kit)	Banrisul
Palmeiras	(Portugal) Abel Ferreira	(Brazil) Felipe Melo	Puma	Crefisa
Red Bull Bragantino	(Brazil) Maurício Barbieri	(Brazil) Léo Ortiz	Nike	Red Bull
Santos	(Brazil) Fábio Carille	(Uruguay) Carlos Sánchez	Umbro	SumUp
São Paulo	(Brazil) Rogério Ceni	(Brazil) Miranda	Adidas	Sportsbet.io
Sport	(Paraguay) Gustavo Florentín	(Brazil) Sander	Umbro	Galera.bet

=== Foreign players ===
The clubs can have a maximum of five foreign players in their Campeonato Brasileiro squads per match, but there is no limit of foreigners in the clubs' squads.

Club	Player 1	Player 2	Player 3	Player 4	Player 5	Player 6	Player 7
América Mineiro	(Colombia) Orlando Berrío	(Argentina) Mauro Zárate					
Athletico Paranaense	(Uruguay) David Terans	(Colombia) Nicolás Hernández					
Atlético Goianiense	(Paraguay) Brian Montenegro						
Atlético Mineiro	(Colombia) Dylan Borrero	(Venezuela) Jefferson Savarino	(Paraguay) Júnior Alonso	(Ecuador) Alan Franco	(Argentina) Matías Zaracho	(Chile) Eduardo Vargas	(Argentina) Ignacio Fernández
Bahia	(Colombia) Juan Pablo Ramírez	(Argentina) Germán Conti	(Paraguay) Óscar Ruiz	(Colombia) Hugo Rodallega	(Argentina) Lucas Mugni	(Argentina) Eugenio Isnaldo	
Ceará	(Colombia) Yony González	(Colombia) Stiven Mendoza					
Chapecoense							
Corinthians	(Chile) Ángelo Araos	(Colombia) Víctor Cantillo					
Cuiabá	(Uruguay) Lucas Hernández	(Paraguay) Alan Mendez	(Colombia) Yesus Cabrera				
Flamengo	(Uruguay) Giorgian De Arrascaeta	(Chile) Mauricio Isla	(Paraguay) Robert Piris Da Motta				
Fluminense	(Ecuador) Juan Cazares	(Uruguay) Abel Hernández	(Paraguay) Raúl Bobadilla	(Colombia) Jhon Arias			
Fortaleza	(Argentina) Valentín Depietri	(Chile) Ángelo Henríquez					
Grêmio	(Argentina) Walter Kannemann	(Argentina) Diego Churín	(Paraguay) Mathías Villasanti	(Colombia) Miguel Borja	(Colombia) Jaminton Campaz		
Internacional	(Argentina) Víctor Cuesta	(Argentina) Renzo Saravia	(Chile) Carlos Palacios	(Colombia) Juan Manuel Cuesta	(Uruguay) Bruno Méndez	(Argentina) Gabriel Mercado	
Juventude	(Peru) Fernando Pacheco	(Colombia) Juan Sebastián Quintero	(Chile) Nicolás Castillo				
Palmeiras	(Paraguay) Gustavo Gómez	(Uruguay) Joaquín Piquerez	(Chile) Benjamín Kuscevic				
Red Bull Bragantino	(Ecuador) Leonardo Realpe	(Venezuela) Jan Carlos Hurtado	(Colombia) César Haydar	(Argentina) Tomás Cuello	(Uruguay) Emiliano Martínez		
Santos	(Uruguay) Carlos Sánchez	(Uruguay) Emiliano Velázquez					
São Paulo	(Ecuador) Robert Arboleda	(Paraguay) Antonio Galeano	(Colombia) Luis Manuel Orejuela	(Argentina) Martín Benítez	(Argentina) Emiliano Rigoni	(Argentina) Jonathan Calleri	(Uruguay) Gabriel Neves
Sport	(Uruguay) Leandro Barcia	(Colombia) Santiago Tréllez	(Argentina) Nicolás Aguirre				

==== Players holding Brazilian dual nationality ====
They do not take foreign slot.

- (Spain) Diego Costa (Atlético Mineiro)
- (United States) Johnny Cardoso (Internacional)
- (South Korea) Chico (Juventude)
- (Italy) Éder (São Paulo)

=== Managerial changes ===
Team	Outgoing manager	Manner of departure	Date of vacancy	Position in table	Incoming manager	Date of appointment	Ref
Cuiabá	(Brazil) Allan Aal	Mutual agreement	1 February 2021	Pre-season	(Brazil) Alberto Valentim	1 April 2021	
São Paulo	(Brazil) Marcos Vizolli	End of caretaker tenure	26 February 2021	Pre-season	(Argentina) Hernán Crespo	26 February 2021	
Athletico Paranaense	(Brazil) Paulo Autuori	Appointed as club director	26 February 2021	Pre-season	(Portugal) António Oliveira	13 March 2021	
Atlético Mineiro	(Argentina) Jorge Sampaoli	Signed by Marseille	26 February 2021	Pre-season	(Brazil) Cuca	5 March 2021	
Fluminense	(Brazil) Marcão	Demoted to assistant coach	26 February 2021	Pre-season	(Brazil) Roger Machado	27 February 2021	
Internacional	(Brazil) Abel Braga	End of contract	26 February 2021	Pre-season	(Spain) Miguel Ángel Ramírez	2 March 2021	
Santos	(Brazil) Marcelo Fernandes	End of caretaker tenure	26 February 2021	Pre-season	(Argentina) Ariel Holan	26 February 2021	
Atlético Goianiense	(Brazil) Marcelo Cabo	Signed by Vasco da Gama	27 February 2021	Pre-season	(Brazil) Jorginho	5 April 2021	
Sport	(Brazil) Jair Ventura	Sacked	5 April 2021	Pre-season	(Brazil) Umberto Louzer	15 April 2021	
Chapecoense	(Brazil) Umberto Louzer	Resigned	14 April 2021	Pre-season	(Brazil) Mozart	18 April 2021	
Grêmio	(Brazil) Renato Gaúcho	Sacked	15 April 2021	Pre-season	(Brazil) Tiago Nunes	21 April 2021	
Fortaleza	(Brazil) Enderson Moreira	Sacked	25 April 2021	Pre-season	(Argentina) Juan Pablo Vojvoda	4 May 2021	
Santos	(Argentina) Ariel Holan	Resigned	26 April 2021	Pre-season	(Brazil) Fernando Diniz	7 May 2021	
Atlético Goianiense	(Brazil) Jorginho	Resigned	15 May 2021	Pre-season	(Brazil) Eduardo Barroca	27 May 2021	
Corinthians	(Brazil) Vagner Mancini	Sacked	16 May 2021	Pre-season	(Brazil) Sylvinho	23 May 2021	
Chapecoense	(Brazil) Mozart	Sacked	27 May 2021	Pre-season	(Brazil) Jair Ventura	31 May 2021	
Cuiabá	(Brazil) Alberto Valentim	Sacked	29 May 2021	2nd	(Brazil) Jorginho (Note: Luiz Fernando Iubel was the caretaker manager until the 9th round, in matches against Fluminense, América Mineiro, São Paulo, Sport, Flamengo and Atlético Mineiro, respectively.)	3 July 2021	
Internacional	(Spain) Miguel Ángel Ramírez	Sacked	11 June 2021	17th	(Uruguay) Diego Aguirre (Note: Osmar Loss was the caretaker manager on the 4th and 5th rounds, against Atlético Mineiro and Ceará, respectively.)	19 June 2021	
América Mineiro	(Brazil) Lisca	Resigned	14 June 2021	20th	(Brazil) Vagner Mancini (Note: Cauan de Almeida was the caretaker manager on the 4th and 5th rounds, against Cuiabá and Palmeiras, respectively.)	19 June 2021	
Grêmio	(Brazil) Tiago Nunes	Sacked	4 July 2021	20th	(Brazil) Luiz Felipe Scolari (Note: Thiago Gomes was the caretaker manager on the 10th round against Palmeiras.)	7 July 2021	
Flamengo	(Brazil) Rogério Ceni	Sacked	10 July 2021	12th	(Brazil) Renato Gaúcho (Note: Maurício Souza was the caretaker manager on the 11th round against Chapecoense.)	10 July 2021	
Chapecoense	(Brazil) Jair Ventura	Sacked	2 August 2021	20th	(Brazil) Pintado	4 August 2021	
Bahia	(Brazil) Dado Cavalcanti	Mutual agreement	17 August 2021	13th	(Argentina) Diego Dabove (Note: Bruno Lopes was the caretaker manager on the 17th round against Grêmio.)	18 August 2021	
Fluminense	(Brazil) Roger Machado	Sacked	21 August 2021	15th	(Brazil) Marcão	21 August 2021	
Sport	(Brazil) Umberto Louzer	Mutual agreement	23 August 2021	18th	(Paraguay) Gustavo Florentín (Note: Ricardo Severo was the caretaker manager on the 18th round against Chapecoense.)	26 August 2021	
Ceará	(Brazil) Guto Ferreira	Sacked	29 August 2021	8th	(Brazil) Tiago Nunes	30 August 2021	
Santos	(Brazil) Fernando Diniz	Sacked	5 September 2021	13th	(Brazil) Fábio Carille	8 September 2021	
Athletico Paranaense	(Portugal) António Oliveira	Resigned	9 September 2021	9th	(Brazil) Alberto Valentim (Note: Paulo Autuori was the caretaker manager between the 20th and 23rd rounds, in matches against América Mineiro, Juventude, Grêmio and Flamengo, respectively.)	1 October 2021	
Atlético Goianiense	(Brazil) Eduardo Barroca	Mutual agreement	27 September 2021	12th	(Brazil) Marcelo Cabo (Note: Eduardo Souza was the caretaker manager between the 23rd and 31st rounds, in matches against Fortaleza, Athletico Paranaense, Fluminense, Atlético Mineiro, Grêmio, Sport and Palmeiras, respectively, plus a delayed match against Flamengo from the 19th round. João Paulo Sanches was the caretaker manager in the 26th round against Bragantino, as Souza was suspended.)	11 November 2021	
Bahia	(Argentina) Diego Dabove	Sacked	6 October 2021	17th	(Brazil) Guto Ferreira	6 October 2021	
Grêmio	(Brazil) Luiz Felipe Scolari	Mutual agreement	11 October 2021	19th	(Brazil) Vagner Mancini (Note: Thiago Gomes was the caretaker manager in the 26th round against Fortaleza.)	15 October 2021	
São Paulo	(Argentina) Hernán Crespo	Mutual agreement	13 October 2021	13th	(Brazil) Rogério Ceni	13 October 2021	
América Mineiro	(Brazil) Vagner Mancini	Resigned, signed by Grêmio	14 October 2021	10th	(Brazil) Marquinhos Santos (Note: Diogo Giacomini was the caretaker manager in the 27th round against Bahia.)	18 October 2021	
Juventude	(Brazil) Marquinhos Santos	Sacked	18 October 2021	17th	(Brazil) Jair Ventura	19 October 2021	
Chapecoense	(Brazil) Pintado	Mutual agreement	26 October 2021	20th	(Brazil) Felipe Endres (caretaker) (Note: Caretaker manager until the end of the tournament.)	26 October 2021	
Flamengo	(Brazil) Renato Gaúcho	Mutual agreement	29 November 2021	2nd	(Brazil) Maurício Souza (caretaker)	29 November 2021	

== Standings ==
=== League table ===
Pos	Team	Pld	W	D	L	GF	GA	GD	Pts	Qualification or relegation
1	Atlético Mineiro (C)	38	26	6	6	67	34	+33	84	Qualification for Copa Libertadores group stage (Note: Palmeiras qualified for the Copa Libertadores group stage by winning the 2021 Copa Libertadores.)
2	Flamengo	38	21	8	9	69	36	+33	71	Qualification for Copa Libertadores group stage
3	Palmeiras	38	20	6	12	58	43	+15	66	Qualification for Copa Libertadores group stage
4	Fortaleza	38	17	7	14	44	45	−1	58	Qualification for Copa Libertadores group stage
5	Corinthians	38	15	12	11	40	36	+4	57	Qualification for Copa Libertadores group stage
6	Red Bull Bragantino	38	14	14	10	55	46	+9	56	Qualification for Copa Libertadores group stage
7	Fluminense	38	15	9	14	38	38	0	54	Qualification for Copa Libertadores second stage
8	América Mineiro	38	13	14	11	41	37	+4	53	Qualification for Copa Libertadores second stage
9	Atlético Goianiense	38	13	14	11	33	36	−3	53	Qualification for Copa Sudamericana group stage
10	Santos	38	12	14	12	35	40	−5	50	Qualification for Copa Sudamericana group stage
11	Ceará	38	11	17	10	39	38	+1	50	Qualification for Copa Sudamericana group stage
12	Internacional	38	12	12	14	44	42	+2	48	Qualification for Copa Sudamericana group stage
13	São Paulo	38	11	15	12	31	39	−8	48	Qualification for Copa Sudamericana group stage
14	Athletico Paranaense	38	13	8	17	41	45	−4	47	Qualification for Copa Libertadores group stage (Note: Athletico Paranaense qualified for the Copa Libertadores group stage by winning the 2021 Copa Sudamericana.)
15	Cuiabá	38	10	17	11	34	37	−3	47	Qualification for Copa Sudamericana group stage
16	Juventude	38	11	13	14	36	44	−8	46	
17	Grêmio (R)	38	12	7	19	44	51	−7	43	Relegation to Campeonato Brasileiro Série B
18	Bahia (R)	38	11	10	17	42	51	−9	43	Relegation to Campeonato Brasileiro Série B
19	Sport (R)	38	9	11	18	24	37	−13	38	Relegation to Campeonato Brasileiro Série B
20	Chapecoense (R)	38	1	12	25	27	67	−40	15	Relegation to Campeonato Brasileiro Série B

Source: CBF
Rules for classification: 1) points; 2) wins; 3) goal difference; 4) goals scored; 5) head-to-head results (only between two teams); 6) fewest red cards; 7) fewest yellow cards; 8) drawing of lots.
(C) Champions; (R) Relegated

=== Positions by round ===
The table lists the positions of teams after each week of matches.
In order to preserve chronological evolvements, any postponed matches are not included to the round at which they were originally scheduled, but added to the full round they were played immediately afterwards.

Team ╲ Round	1	2	3	4	5	6	7	8	9	10	11	12	13	14	15	16	17	18	19	20	21	22	23	24	25	26	27	28	29	30	31	32	33	34	35	36	37	38
América Mineiro	16	19	20	19	19	19	19	16	15	15	16	17	18	18	17	18	19	17	17	17	18	15	14	10	10	11	13	10	9	12	10	9	9	10	10	8	8	8
Athletico-PR	5	2	2	2	1	2	2	2	2	3	5	5	5	6	6	6	9	9	9	11	10	9	9	7	8	8	10	12	15	11	9	11	13	13	13	13	14	14
Atlético-GO	7	3	4	8	8	6	7	10	7	8	10	11	8	9	9	7	7	7	8	10	11	12	10	11	11	12	11	9	11	13	15	14	16	15	15	11	9	9
Atlético-MG	15	9	5	3	5	7	8	5	4	4	3	2	2	2	1	1	1	1	1	1	1	1	1	1	1	1	1	1	1	1	1	1	1	1	1	1	1	1
Bahia	2	5	8	7	7	4	5	9	6	6	6	8	9	10	10	13	15	16	16	15	15	17	17	18	17	17	16	15	16	15	16	16	17	17	17	17	16	18
Ceará	3	11	11	12	12	12	12	12	8	9	11	7	7	7	7	8	8	8	10	12	13	11	12	13	14	14	14	14	13	10	12	10	10	9	8	9	10	11
Chapecoense	19	20	18	17	16	18	18	19	19	19	19	20	20	20	20	20	20	20	20	20	20	20	20	20	20	20	20	20	20	20	20	20	20	20	20	20	20	20
Corinthians	18	10	10	10	11	11	11	11	13	10	12	12	10	11	12	11	6	6	6	6	6	6	6	5	6	6	6	7	6	6	6	5	5	4	4	4	4	5
Cuiabá	9	13	15	15	17	16	16	18	18	18	18	18	15	16	18	16	14	15	11	8	9	10	11	12	12	9	9	11	10	9	11	13	12	11	12	16	15	15
Flamengo	6	8	3	9	10	8	10	6	10	12	8	6	6	5	5	5	5	5	5	3	3	4	3	2	2	2	2	4	3	3	3	2	2	2	2	2	2	2
Fluminense	13	6	7	5	6	9	9	13	9	11	7	9	11	12	13	15	16	13	7	7	8	8	8	9	9	10	8	8	8	8	8	8	8	7	7	7	7	7
Fortaleza	4	1	1	1	2	3	4	4	5	5	4	3	3	3	3	3	3	3	3	4	4	3	4	4	4	3	3	3	5	5	4	6	6	5	5	5	5	4
Grêmio	14	18	19	20	20	20	20	20	20	20	20	19	19	19	19	19	17	18	19	18	17	18	18	17	19	19	19	19	19	19	19	19	19	18	18	18	18	17
Internacional	10	17	13	14	13	13	13	14	14	14	15	13	14	14	11	9	10	10	12	9	7	7	7	8	7	7	7	6	7	7	7	7	7	8	9	10	12	12
Juventude	11	16	14	18	14	14	14	8	12	13	13	14	13	13	14	12	13	14	13	14	16	14	15	15	15	15	17	16	18	18	17	17	15	16	16	15	17	16
Palmeiras	17	7	9	6	4	5	3	3	3	1	1	1	1	1	2	2	2	2	2	2	2	2	2	3	3	5	4	2	2	2	2	3	3	3	3	3	3	3
Red Bull Bragantino	1	4	6	4	3	1	1	1	1	2	2	4	4	4	4	4	4	4	4	5	5	5	5	6	5	4	5	5	4	4	5	4	4	6	6	6	6	6
Santos	20	12	12	13	9	10	6	7	11	7	9	10	12	8	8	10	11	11	14	13	14	16	16	16	16	16	15	17	14	16	13	12	11	12	11	12	11	10
São Paulo	12	15	17	16	18	17	17	17	17	16	14	15	17	17	16	14	12	12	15	16	12	13	13	14	13	13	12	13	12	14	14	15	14	14	14	14	13	13
Sport	8	14	16	11	15	15	15	15	16	17	17	16	16	15	15	17	18	19	18	19	19	19	19	19	18	18	18	18	17	17	18	18	18	19	19	19	19	19

Leader and Copa Libertadores group stage
Copa Libertadores group stage
Copa Libertadores second stage
Copa Sudamericana group stage
Relegation to Campeonato Brasileiro Série B

Source: CBF.com

== Results ==
Home \ Away	AMG	CAP	ACG	CAM	BAH	CEA	CHA	COR	CUI	FLA	FLU	FOR	GRE	INT	JUV	PAL	RBB	SAN	SPA	SPO
América Mineiro	—	2–0	0–0	0–1	0–0	2–0	3–0	0–1	0–0	1–1	1–0	2–1	3–1	1–1	1–1	2–1	0–2	2–0	2–0	0–1
Athletico Paranaense	1–0	—	2–1	0–1	0–2	2–1	2–2	0–1	1–0	2–2	0–1	2–1	4–2	2–1	2–1	0–0	2–2	0–1	1–2	0–0
Atlético Goianiense	1–1	0–2	—	2–1	2–1	1–1	1–1	1–1	0–0	2–0	1–0	0–0	2–0	0–0	1–1	0–3	0–1	0–0	2–0	1–1
Atlético Mineiro	1–0	2–0	4–1	—	3–0	3–1	1–1	3–0	2–1	2–1	2–1	1–2	2–1	1–0	2–0	2–0	4–3	3–1	1–0	3–0
Bahia	3–4	2–1	1–2	2–3	—	1–1	3–0	0–0	0–0	0–5	2–0	4–2	3–1	0–1	1–0	0–0	1–1	3–0	1–0	0–1
Ceará	0–0	1–0	0–0	2–1	1–2	—	1–0	2–1	1–0	1–1	1–0	3–1	3–2	0–0	2–0	1–2	2–2	0–0	1–1	2–1
Chapecoense	1–1	1–1	0–1	2–2	0–2	0–0	—	0–1	2–3	2–2	1–2	1–2	1–3	1–2	0–2	0–2	0–3	0–1	1–1	0–1
Corinthians	1–1	1–0	0–1	1–2	3–1	3–1	1–0	—	3–2	1–3	1–0	1–0	1–1	1–1	1–1	2–1	1–2	2–0	0–0	2–1
Cuiabá	0–2	1–0	2–1	0–1	1–1	2–2	0–0	1–2	—	0–2	2–2	1–0	0–1	1–0	2–2	1–3	1–0	2–1	0–0	1–0
Flamengo	2–0	3–0	2–0	1–0	3–0	2–1	2–1	1–0	0–0	—	0–1	2–1	0–1	0–4	3–1	1–0	2–3	0–1	5–1	2–0
Fluminense	2–0	1–4	0–0	1–1	2–0	0–0	3–0	1–1	1–0	3–1	—	0–2	0–1	1–0	1–1	2–1	2–1	1–0	2–1	1–0
Fortaleza	4–0	3–0	0–3	0–2	1–1	0–4	3–2	1–0	0–0	0–3	1–1	—	1–0	5–1	1–0	1–0	1–0	1–1	1–1	1–0
Grêmio	1–1	0–1	0–1	4–3	2–0	2–0	2–1	0–1	2–2	2–2	1–0	0–0	—	0–0	3–2	1–3	3–0	2–2	3–0	1–2
Internacional	3–1	2–1	1–2	0–1	2–0	1–1	5–2	2–2	0–0	1–2	4–2	1–0	1–0	—	1–0	1–2	1–1	1–1	0–2	2–2
Juventude	1–1	0–3	1–1	1–2	0–0	0–0	1–0	1–0	1–2	1–0	1–0	1–1	2–0	2–1	—	0–3	1–0	3–0	1–1	1–0
Palmeiras	2–1	2–1	4–0	2–2	3–2	1–0	3–1	1–1	0–2	1–3	1–0	2–3	2–0	1–0	1–1	—	2–4	3–2	0–2	2–1
Red Bull Bragantino	1–1	0–2	1–0	1–1	3–3	0–0	1–2	2–2	1–1	1–1	2–2	3–0	1–0	1–0	1–2	3–1	—	2–2	1–0	3–0
Santos	0–2	2–1	0–1	2–0	0–0	3–1	2–0	0–0	1–1	0–4	2–0	2–0	1–0	2–2	0–0	0–2	2–0	—	2–0	0–0
São Paulo	0–0	0–0	2–1	0–0	1–0	1–1	1–1	1–0	2–2	0–4	0–0	0–1	2–1	1–0	3–1	0–0	1–2	1–1	—	2–0
Sport	2–3	1–1	2–0	0–1	1–0	0–0	0–0	1–0	0–0	1–1	1–2	0–1	1–0	0–1	3–1	0–1	0–0	0–0	0–1	—

Source: CBF
Legend: Blue = home team win; Yellow = draw; Red = away team win.

== Season statistics ==
=== Top scorers ===
Rank	Player	Club	Goals
1	(Brazil) Hulk	Atlético Mineiro	19
2	(Brazil) Gilberto	Bahia	15
3	(Brazil) Michael	Flamengo	14
4	(Brazil) Ademir	América Mineiro	13
5	(Brazil) Artur	Red Bull Bragantino	12
5	(Brazil) Gabriel Barbosa	Flamengo	12
5	(Brazil) Ytalo	Red Bull Bragantino	12
5	(Brazil) Yuri Alberto	Internacional	12
9	(Brazil) Bruno Henrique	Flamengo	11
9	(Brazil) Edenílson	Internacional	11

Source: Soccerway

=== Hat-tricks ===
Player	For	Against	Result	Date	Ref.
(Brazil) Ytalo	Red Bull Bragantino	Palmeiras	3–1 (H)	23 June 2021	
(Brazil) Gabriel Barbosa	Flamengo	Bahia	5–0 (A)	18 July 2021	
(Brazil) Bruno Henrique	Flamengo	São Paulo	5–1 (H)	25 July 2021	
(Brazil) Yuri Alberto	Internacional	Flamengo	4–0 (A)	8 August 2021	
(Brazil) Gabriel Barbosa	Flamengo	Santos	4–0 (A)	28 August 2021	
(Colombia) Hugo Rodallega^{4}	Bahia	Fortaleza	4–2 (H)	4 September 2021	
(Brazil) Yuri Alberto	Internacional	Chapecoense	5–2 (H)	10 October 2021	

Notes

^{4} Player scored 4 goals
(H) – Home team
(A) – Away team

=== Assists ===
Rank	Player	Club	Assists
1	(Brazil) Gustavo Scarpa	Palmeiras	13
2	(Brazil) Artur	Red Bull Bragantino	8
2	(Brazil) Vitinho	Flamengo	8
4	(Brazil) Lucas Crispim	Fortaleza	7
4	(Brazil) Edenílson	Internacional	7
4	(Brazil) Hulk	Atlético Mineiro	7
4	(Brazil) Rafinha	Grêmio	7
4	(Uruguay) David Terans	Athletico Paranaense	7
9	(Uruguay) Giorgian De Arrascaeta	Flamengo	6
9	(Brazil) Ferreira	Grêmio	6

Source: Soccerway

=== Clean sheets ===
Rank	Player	Club	Clean sheets
1	(Brazil) Everson	Atlético Mineiro	16
1	(Brazil) Fernando Miguel	Atlético Goianiense	16
3	(Brazil) Walter	Cuiabá	15
4	(Brazil) João Paulo	Santos	14
4	(Brazil) Mailson	Sport	14
4	(Brazil) Tiago Volpi	São Paulo	14
7	(Brazil) Matheus Cavichioli	América Mineiro	12
7	(Brazil) Cleiton	Red Bull Bragantino	12
7	(Brazil) Marcos Felipe	Fluminense	12
10	(Brazil) Cássio	Corinthians	11

Source: FBref.com

== Awards ==
=== Monthly awards ===
Month	Player of the month		Ref.
Month	Player	Club	Ref.
June	(Brazil) Gustavo Scarpa	Palmeiras	
July	(Brazil) Hulk	Atlético Mineiro	
August	(Brazil) Hulk	Atlético Mineiro	
September	(Brazil) Róger Guedes	Corinthians	
October	(Brazil) Raphael Veiga	Palmeiras	
November	(Brazil) Hulk	Atlético Mineiro	
December	Not Awarded		

=== Annual awards ===
Award	Winner	Club
Prêmio Craque do Brasileirão Best Coach	(Brazil) Cuca	Atlético Mineiro
Bola de Prata Best Coach	(Brazil) Cuca	Atlético Mineiro
Prêmio Craque do Brasileirão Best Newcomer	(Brazil) André	Fluminense
Bola de Prata Best Newcomer	(Argentina) Matías Zaracho	Atlético Mineiro
Prêmio Craque do Brasileirão Best Player	(Brazil) Hulk	Atlético Mineiro
Bola de Ouro Best Player	(Brazil) Hulk	Atlético Mineiro
Prêmio Craque do Brasileirão Goal of the Season	(Brazil) Michael	Flamengo

Série A Team of the Year
Goalkeeper	(Brazil) Weverton (Palmeiras)			
Defenders	(Brazil) Yago Pikachu (Fortaleza)	(Paraguay) Gustavo Gómez (Palmeiras)	(Paraguay) Júnior Alonso (Atlético Mineiro)	(Brazil) Guilherme Arana (Atlético Mineiro)
Midfielders	(Brazil) Raphael Veiga (Palmeiras)	(Brazil) Edenílson (Internacional)	(Brazil) Jair (Atlético Mineiro)	(Argentina) Ignacio Fernández (Atlético Mineiro)
Forwards	(Brazil) Michael (Flamengo)		(Brazil) Hulk (Atlético Mineiro)	
