= 2023 Campeonato Brasileiro Série A =

Football league

Campeonato Brasileiro Série A
- Season: 2023
- Dates: 15 April – 6 December 2023
- Champions: Palmeiras (12th title)
- Relegated: Santos; Goiás; Coritiba; América Mineiro
- Copa Libertadores: Palmeiras; Grêmio; Atlético Mineiro; Flamengo; Botafogo; Red Bull Bragantino; Fluminense (via Copa Libertadores); São Paulo (via Copa do Brasil)
- Copa Sudamericana: Athletico Paranaense; Internacional; Fortaleza; Cuiabá; Corinthians; Cruzeiro
- Matches: 380
- Goals: 948 (2.49 per match)
- Top goalscorer: Paulinho (20 goals)
- Biggest home win: Internacional 7–1 Santos (22 October)
- Biggest away win: Goiás 0–5 Palmeiras (7 May)
- Highest scoring: Goiás 4–6 Bahia (7 October)
- Average attendance: 24,116

The 2023 Campeonato Brasileiro Série A (officially the Brasileirão Assaí 2023 for sponsorship reasons) was the 67th season of the Campeonato Brasileiro Série A, the top level of professional football in Brazil, and the 21nd edition in a double round-robin since its establishment in 2003. The competition began on 15 April and ended on 6 December 2023.

The top six teams as well as the 2023 Copa do Brasil champions qualified for the Copa Libertadores. The next six best-placed teams not qualified for Copa Libertadores qualified for the Copa Sudamericana and the last four were relegated to Série B for 2024.

Defending champions Palmeiras won their twelfth league championship in this season, clinching the title on the final day of the season with a 1–1 draw against Cruzeiro.

== Teams ==
Twenty teams competed in the league: the top 16 teams from the previous season and four teams promoted from the Série B.

Cruzeiro became the first club to be promoted on 21 September 2022 after a 3–0 win against Vasco da Gama. Grêmio were promoted on 23 October 2022, and Bahia and Vasco da Gama were promoted on 6 November 2022.

Location of teams in 2023 Série A

Pos.	Relegated from 2022 Série A
17th	Ceará
18th	Atlético Goianiense
19th	Avaí
20th	Juventude

Pos.	Promoted from 2022 Série B
1st	Cruzeiro
2nd	Grêmio
3rd	Bahia
4th	Vasco da Gama

=== Number of teams by state ===
N.T.	State	Team(s)
5	São Paulo	Corinthians, Palmeiras, Red Bull Bragantino, Santos, and São Paulo
4	Rio de Janeiro	Botafogo, Flamengo, Fluminense, and Vasco da Gama
3	Minas Gerais	América Mineiro, Atlético Mineiro, and Cruzeiro
2	Paraná	Athletico Paranaense and Coritiba
2	Rio Grande do Sul	Grêmio and Internacional
1	Bahia	Bahia
1	Ceará	Fortaleza
1	Goiás	Goiás
1	Mato Grosso	Cuiabá

=== Stadiums and locations ===
Team	Location	State	Stadium	Capacity
América Mineiro	Belo Horizonte	Minas Gerais	Independência	23,018
Athletico Paranaense	Curitiba	Paraná	Ligga Arena	42,372
Atlético Mineiro	Belo Horizonte	Minas Gerais	Arena MRV	44,892
Bahia	Salvador	Bahia	Itaipava Arena Fonte Nova	47,907
Botafogo	Rio de Janeiro	Rio de Janeiro	Olímpico Nilton Santos	44,661
Corinthians	São Paulo	São Paulo	Neo Química Arena	47,605
Coritiba	Curitiba	Paraná	Couto Pereira	40,502
Cruzeiro	Belo Horizonte	Minas Gerais	Mineirão	61,927
Cuiabá	Cuiabá	Mato Grosso	Arena Pantanal	44,000
Flamengo	Rio de Janeiro	Rio de Janeiro	Maracanã	78,838
Fluminense	Rio de Janeiro	Rio de Janeiro	Maracanã	78,838
Fortaleza	Fortaleza	Ceará	Castelão	63,903
Goiás	Goiânia	Goiás	Serrinha	14,450
Grêmio	Porto Alegre	Rio Grande do Sul	Arena do Grêmio	55,225
Internacional	Porto Alegre	Rio Grande do Sul	Beira-Rio	50,128
Palmeiras	São Paulo	São Paulo	Allianz Parque	43,713
Red Bull Bragantino	Bragança Paulista	São Paulo	Nabi Abi Chedid	17,128
Santos	Santos	São Paulo	Vila Belmiro	16,068
São Paulo	São Paulo	São Paulo	Morumbi	72,039
Vasco da Gama	Rio de Janeiro	Rio de Janeiro	São Januário	24,584

== Personnel and kits ==
Team	Head coach	Captain	Kit manufacturer	Shirt main sponsor
América Mineiro	(Brazil) Diogo Giacomini (caretaker)	(Brazil) Juninho	Volt Sport	Estrela Bet
Athletico Paranaense	(Brazil) Wesley Carvalho (caretaker)	(Brazil) Thiago Heleno	Umbro	Esportes da Sorte
Atlético Mineiro	(Brazil) Luiz Felipe Scolari	(Argentina) Rodrigo Battaglia	Adidas	Betano
Bahia	(Brazil) Rogério Ceni	(Brazil) Kanu	Esquadrão (club manufactured kit)	Esportes da Sorte
Botafogo	(Brazil) Tiago Nunes	(Brazil) Fernando Marçal	Reebok	Parimatch
Corinthians	(Brazil) Mano Menezes	(Brazil) Cássio	Nike	Neo Química
Coritiba	(Brazil) Guto Ferreira	(Brazil) Henrique	Sou 1909 (club manufactured kit)	Neodent
Cruzeiro	(Brazil) Paulo Autuori (caretaker)	(Brazil) Rafael Cabral	Adidas	Betfair
Cuiabá	(Portugal) António Oliveira	(Brazil) Walter	Umbro	Drebor
Flamengo	(Brazil) Tite	(Brazil) Éverton Ribeiro	Adidas	Banco BRB
Fluminense	(Brazil) Fernando Diniz	(Brazil) Nino	Umbro	Betano
Fortaleza	(Argentina) Juan Pablo Vojvoda	(Brazil) Tinga	Volt Sport	Novibet
Goiás	(Brazil) Mário Henrique (caretaker)	(Brazil) Tadeu	Gr33n (club manufactured kit)	Esportes da Sorte
Grêmio	(Brazil) Renato Gaúcho	(Brazil) Pedro Geromel	Umbro	Banrisul
Internacional	(Argentina) Eduardo Coudet	(Brazil) Alan Patrick	Adidas	Banrisul
Palmeiras	(Portugal) Abel Ferreira	(Paraguay) Gustavo Gómez	Puma	Crefisa
Red Bull Bragantino	(Portugal) Pedro Caixinha	(Brazil) Léo Ortiz	New Balance	Red Bull
Santos	(Brazil) Marcelo Fernandes (caretaker)	(Venezuela) Tomás Rincón	Umbro	Blaze
São Paulo	(Brazil) Dorival Júnior	(Brazil) Rafinha	Adidas	Sportsbet.io
Vasco da Gama	(Argentina) Ramón Díaz	(Chile) Gary Medel	Kappa	Pixbet

=== Coaching changes ===
Team	Outgoing head coach	Manner of departure	Date of vacancy	Position in table	Incoming head coach	Date of appointment	Ref
Bahia	(Brazil) Eduardo Barroca	End of contract	6 November 2022	Pre-season	(Portugal) Renato Paiva	6 December 2022	
Vasco da Gama	(Brazil) Jorginho	End of contract	10 November 2022	Pre-season	(Brazil) Maurício Barbieri	6 December 2022	
Red Bull Bragantino	(Brazil) Marcinho	End of caretaker spell	13 November 2022	Pre-season	(Portugal) Pedro Caixinha	10 December 2022	
Santos	(Brazil) Orlando Ribeiro	End of caretaker spell	13 November 2022	Pre-season	(Brazil) Odair Hellmann	16 November 2022	
Athletico Paranaense	(Brazil) Luiz Felipe Scolari	Appointed as club director	13 November 2022	Pre-season	(Brazil) Paulo Turra	13 November 2022	
Corinthians	(Portugal) Vítor Pereira	Contract ended	13 November 2022	Pre-season	(Brazil) Fernando Lázaro	20 November 2022	
Goiás	(Brazil) Jair Ventura	Contract ended	13 November 2022	Pre-season	(Brazil) Guto Ferreira	10 December 2022	
Atlético Mineiro	(Brazil) Cuca	Mutual agreement	14 November 2022	Pre-season	(Argentina) Eduardo Coudet	19 November 2022	
Flamengo	(Brazil) Dorival Júnior	End of contract	25 November 2022	Pre-season	(Portugal) Vítor Pereira	13 December 2022	
Cuiabá	(Portugal) António Oliveira	End of contract	5 December 2022	Pre-season	(Portugal) Ivo Vieira	9 December 2022	
Coritiba	(Brazil) Guto Ferreira	Sacked	9 December 2022	Pre-season	(Portugal) António Oliveira	13 December 2022	
Cruzeiro	(Uruguay) Paulo Pezzolano	Mutual agreement	19 March 2023	State leagues	(Portugal) Pepa	20 March 2023	
Goiás	(Brazil) Guto Ferreira	Sacked	10 April 2023	State leagues	(Brazil) Emerson Ávila (caretaker)	11 April 2023	
Flamengo	(Portugal) Vítor Pereira	Sacked	11 April 2023	State leagues	(Brazil) Mário Jorge (caretaker)	11 April 2023	
Flamengo	(Brazil) Mário Jorge	End of caretaker spell	16 April 2023	2nd	(Argentina) Jorge Sampaoli	14 April 2023	
Coritiba	(Portugal) António Oliveira	Sacked	18 April 2023	19th	(Brazil) Leomir de Souza (caretaker)	18 April 2023	
São Paulo	(Brazil) Rogério Ceni	Sacked	19 April 2023	14th	(Brazil) Dorival Júnior	20 April 2023	
Corinthians	(Brazil) Fernando Lázaro	Demoted to assistant coach	20 April 2023	6th	(Brazil) Cuca	20 April 2023	
Coritiba	(Brazil) Leomir de Souza	End of caretaker spell	23 April 2023	19th	(Brazil) Antônio Carlos Zago	22 April 2023	
Corinthians	(Brazil) Cuca	Resigned	27 April 2023	14th	(Brazil) Danilo (caretaker)	28 April 2023	
Corinthians	(Brazil) Danilo	End of caretaker spell	1 May 2023	16th	(Brazil) Vanderlei Luxemburgo	1 May 2023	
Cuiabá	(Portugal) Ivo Vieira	Sacked	10 May 2023	17th	(Brazil) Luiz Fernando Iubel (caretaker)	10 May 2023	
Cuiabá	(Brazil) Luiz Fernando Iubel	End of caretaker spell	13 May 2023	18th	(Portugal) António Oliveira	13 May 2023	
Goiás	(Brazil) Emerson Ávila	End of caretaker spell	11 June 2023	17th	(Portugal) Armando Evangelista	9 June 2023	
Atlético Mineiro	(Argentina) Eduardo Coudet	Resigned	11 June 2023	3rd	(Brazil) Luiz Felipe Scolari	16 June 2023	
Athletico Paranaense	(Brazil) Paulo Turra	Sacked	16 June 2023	7th	(Brazil) Wesley Carvalho (caretaker)	16 June 2023	
Santos	(Brazil) Odair Hellmann	Mutual agreement	22 June 2023	13th	(Brazil) Paulo Turra (Note: Claudiomiro was the caretaker head coach in the 12th round against Flamengo on 25 June.)	23 June 2023	
Vasco da Gama	(Brazil) Maurício Barbieri	Sacked	23 June 2023	19th	(Brazil) William Batista (caretaker)	23 June 2023	
Coritiba	(Brazil) Antônio Carlos Zago	Sacked	27 June 2023	20th	(Brazil) Thiago Kosloski (Note: Originally as caretaker manager, appointed on a permanent basis on 31 July 2023.)	27 June 2023	
Botafogo	(Portugal) Luís Castro	Signed by Al Nassr	30 June 2023	1st	(Brazil) Cláudio Caçapa (caretaker)	1 July 2023	
Botafogo	(Brazil) Cláudio Caçapa	End of caretaker spell	9 July 2023	1st	(Portugal) Bruno Lage	8 July 2023	
Vasco da Gama	(Brazil) William Batista	End of caretaker spell	15 July 2023	19th	(Argentina) Ramón Díaz	15 July 2023	
Internacional	(Brazil) Mano Menezes	Sacked	17 July 2023	11th	(Argentina) Eduardo Coudet	19 July 2023	
Santos	(Brazil) Paulo Turra	Sacked	6 August 2023	16th	(Uruguay) Diego Aguirre	6 August 2023	
América Mineiro	(Brazil) Vagner Mancini	Sacked	7 August 2023	20th	(Brazil) Diogo Giacomini (caretaker)	7 August 2023	
América Mineiro	(Brazil) Diogo Giacomini	End of caretaker spell	10 August 2023	20th	(Argentina) Fabián Bustos	9 August 2023	
Cruzeiro	(Portugal) Pepa	Sacked	29 August 2023	12th	(Brazil) Fernando Seabra (caretaker)	29 August 2023	
Cruzeiro	(Brazil) Fernando Seabra	End of caretaker spell	5 September 2023	12th	(Brazil) Zé Ricardo	5 September 2023	
Bahia	(Portugal) Renato Paiva	Sacked	6 September 2023	16th	(Brazil) Rogério Ceni	9 September 2023	
Santos	(Uruguay) Diego Aguirre	Sacked	15 September 2023	17th	(Brazil) Marcelo Fernandes (caretaker) (Note: Caretaker head coach until the end of the season.)	15 September 2023	
Corinthians	(Brazil) Vanderlei Luxemburgo	Sacked	27 September 2023	11th	(Brazil) Mano Menezes	28 September 2023	
Flamengo	(Argentina) Jorge Sampaoli	Sacked	28 September 2023	7th	(Brazil) Mário Jorge (caretaker)	28 September 2023	
Botafogo	(Portugal) Bruno Lage	Sacked	3 October 2023	1st	(Brazil) Lúcio Flávio (caretaker)	3 October 2023	
Flamengo	(Brazil) Mário Jorge	End of caretaker spell	9 October 2023	5th	(Brazil) Tite	9 October 2023	
América Mineiro	(Argentina) Fabián Bustos	Sacked	9 November 2023	20th	(Brazil) Diogo Giacomini (caretaker)	9 November 2023	
Cruzeiro	(Brazil) Zé Ricardo	Sacked	12 November 2023	17th	(Brazil) Paulo Autuori (caretaker)	14 November 2023	
Goiás	(Portugal) Armando Evangelista	Sacked	14 November 2023	18th	(Brazil) Mário Henrique (caretaker)	14 November 2023	
Botafogo	(Brazil) Lúcio Flávio	Sacked	14 November 2023	2nd	(Brazil) Tiago Nunes	16 November 2023	
Coritiba	(Brazil) Thiago Kosloski	Sacked	27 November 2023	19th	(Brazil) Guto Ferreira (Note: Guilherme Bossle will be the caretaker head coach in the 36th round against Botafogo on 29 November.)	27 November 2023	

=== Foreign players ===
The clubs can have a maximum of seven foreign players in their Campeonato Brasileiro squads per match, but there is no limit of foreigners in the clubs' squads.

Club	Player 1	Player 2	Player 3	Player 4	Player 5	Player 6	Player 7	Player 8	Player 9
América Mineiro	(Argentina) Martín Benítez	(Uruguay) Gonzalo Mastriani	(Argentina) Emmanuel Martínez	(China) Aloísio	(Uruguay) Javier Méndez	(Argentina) Esteban Burgos	(Ecuador) Juan Cazares	(Uruguay) Washington Aguerre	
Athletico Paranaense	(Argentina) Tomás Cuello	(Uruguay) Agustín Canobbio	(Chile) Luciano Arriagada	(Argentina) Lucas Esquivel	(Chile) Arturo Vidal	(Italy) Bruno Zapelli	(Bolivia) Fernando Nava		
Atlético Mineiro	(Argentina) Matías Zaracho	(Chile) Eduardo Vargas	(Argentina) Cristian Pavón	(Argentina) Renzo Saravia	(Uruguay) Mauricio Lemos	(Argentina) Rodrigo Battaglia	(Ecuador) Alan Franco		
Bahia	(Argentina) Lucas Mugni	(Uruguay) Nicolás Acevedo	(Uruguay) Camilo Cándido						
Botafogo	(Paraguay) Gatito Fernández	(Argentina) Víctor Cuesta	(Nicaragua) Jacob Montes	(Argentina) Leonel Di Plácido	(Paraguay) Matías Segovia	(Uruguay) Diego Hernández	(Uruguay) Mateo Ponte	(Uruguay) Valentín Adamo	(Angola) Bastos
Corinthians	(Colombia) Víctor Cantillo	(Portugal) Rafael Ramos	(Uruguay) Bruno Méndez	(Argentina) Fausto Vera	(Paraguay) Ángel Romero	(Paraguay) Matías Rojas			
Coritiba	(Argentina) Marcelino Moreno	(Chile) Benjamín Kuscevic	(Colombia) Sebastián Gómez	(Algeria) Islam Slimani	(Greece) Andreas Samaris	(Spain) Jesé			
Cruzeiro	(Colombia) Helibelton Palacios								
Cuiabá	(Paraguay) Isidro Pitta								
Flamengo	(Uruguay) Giorgian de Arrascaeta	(Paraguay) Santiago Ocampos	(Chile) Erick Pulgar	(Uruguay) Guillermo Varela	(Argentina) Agustín Rossi				
Fluminense	(Colombia) Jhon Arias	(Argentina) Germán Cano	(Colombia) Yony González	(Uruguay) Leonardo Fernández					
Fortaleza	(Argentina) Silvio Romero	(Argentina) Emanuel Brítez	(Argentina) Tomás Pochettino	(Argentina) Juan Martín Lucero	(Argentina) Gonzalo Escobar	(Portugal) Tobias Figueiredo	(Venezuela) Kervin Andrade	(Argentina) Imanol Machuca	
Goiás	(Argentina) Julián Palacios								
Grêmio	(Argentina) Walter Kannemann	(Paraguay) Mathías Villasanti	(Uruguay) Felipe Carballo	(Argentina) Franco Cristaldo	(Uruguay) Luis Suárez	(Paraguay) Juan Iturbe	(Argentina) Lucas Besozzi	(Paraguay) Freddy Noguera	
Internacional	(Argentina) Gabriel Mercado	(Argentina) Fabricio Bustos	(Uruguay) Carlos de Pena	(Colombia) Nico Hernández	(Chile) Charles Aránguiz	(Ecuador) Enner Valencia	(Uruguay) Sergio Rochet	(Spain) Hugo Mallo	
Palmeiras	(Paraguay) Gustavo Gómez	(Uruguay) Joaquín Piquerez	(Colombia) Eduard Atuesta	(Argentina) José Manuel López	(Colombia) Richard Ríos				
Red Bull Bragantino	(Ecuador) Leonardo Realpe	(Ecuador) José Hurtado	(Uruguay) Thiago Borbas	(Colombia) Henry Mosquera	(Uruguay) Ignacio Laquintana	(Colombia) Yani Quintero			
Santos	(Uruguay) Rodrigo Fernández	(Venezuela) Yeferson Soteldo	(Bolivia) Miguel Terceros	(Colombia) Stiven Mendoza	(Argentina) Julio Furch	(Venezuela) Tomás Rincón	(Uruguay) Maximiliano Silvera	(Colombia) Alfredo Morelos	
São Paulo	(Ecuador) Robert Arboleda	(Argentina) Jonathan Calleri	(Uruguay) Gabriel Neves	(Argentina) Giuliano Galoppo	(Argentina) Alan Franco	(Venezuela) Nahuel Ferraresi	(Ecuador) Jhegson Méndez	(Uruguay) Michel Araújo	(Colombia) James Rodríguez
Vasco da Gama	(Uruguay) José Luis Rodríguez	(Argentina) Luca Orellano	(Argentina) Manuel Capasso	(Chile) Gary Medel	(Paraguay) Sebastián Ferreira	(Argentina) Pablo Vegetti	(France) Dimitri Payet		

==== Players holding Brazilian dual nationality ====
They do not take foreign slot.

- (Bulgaria) Cicinho (Bahia)
- (Spain) Diego Costa (Botafogo)
- (Germany) Rodrigo Pinho (Coritiba)
- (Portugal) Raphael Guzzo (Goiás)
- (Italy) João Pedro (Grêmio)
- (United States) Johnny Cardoso (Internacional)
- (Belgium) Wanderson (Internacional)
- (Portugal) João Moreira (São Paulo)
- (Portugal) Marcos Paulo (São Paulo)

== Standings ==
=== League table ===
Pos	Team	Pld	W	D	L	GF	GA	GD	Pts	Qualification or relegation
1	Palmeiras (C)	38	20	10	8	64	33	+31	70	Qualification for Copa Libertadores group stage
2	Grêmio	38	21	5	12	63	56	+7	68	Qualification for Copa Libertadores group stage
3	Atlético Mineiro	38	19	9	10	52	32	+20	66	Qualification for Copa Libertadores group stage
4	Flamengo	38	19	9	10	56	42	+14	66	Qualification for Copa Libertadores group stage
5	Botafogo	38	18	10	10	58	37	+21	64	Qualification for Copa Libertadores second stage
6	Red Bull Bragantino	38	17	11	10	49	35	+14	62	Qualification for Copa Libertadores second stage
7	Fluminense	38	16	8	14	51	47	+4	56	Qualification for Copa Libertadores group stage (Note: Fluminense qualified for the Copa Libertadores group stage by winning the 2023 Copa Libertadores.)
8	Athletico Paranaense	38	14	14	10	51	43	+8	56	Qualification for Copa Sudamericana group stage
9	Internacional	38	15	10	13	46	45	+1	55	Qualification for Copa Sudamericana group stage
10	Fortaleza	38	15	9	14	45	44	+1	54	Qualification for Copa Sudamericana group stage
11	São Paulo	38	14	11	13	40	38	+2	53	Qualification for Copa Libertadores group stage (Note: São Paulo qualified for the Copa Libertadores group stage by winning the 2023 Copa do Brasil.)
12	Cuiabá	38	14	9	15	40	39	+1	51	Qualification for Copa Sudamericana group stage
13	Corinthians	38	12	14	12	47	48	−1	50	Qualification for Copa Sudamericana group stage
14	Cruzeiro	38	11	14	13	35	32	+3	47	Qualification for Copa Sudamericana group stage
15	Vasco da Gama	38	12	9	17	41	51	−10	45	
16	Bahia	38	12	8	18	50	53	−3	44	
17	Santos (R)	38	11	10	17	39	64	−25	43	Relegation to Campeonato Brasileiro Série B
18	Goiás (R)	38	9	11	18	36	53	−17	38	Relegation to Campeonato Brasileiro Série B
19	Coritiba (R)	38	8	6	24	41	73	−32	30	Relegation to Campeonato Brasileiro Série B
20	América Mineiro (R)	38	5	9	24	42	81	−39	24	Relegation to Campeonato Brasileiro Série B

Source: CBF
Rules for classification: 1) points; 2) wins; 3) goal difference; 4) goals scored; 5) head-to-head results (only between two teams); 6) fewest red cards; 7) fewest yellow cards; 8) drawing of lots.
(C) Champions; (R) Relegated

== Results ==
Home \ Away	AMG	CAP	CAM	BAH	BOT	COR	CFC	CRU	CUI	FLA	FLU	FOR	GOI	GRE	INT	PAL	RBB	SAN	SPA	VAS
América Mineiro	—	2–2	1–1	3–2	1–2	2–0	0–3	0–4	1–2	0–3	0–3	2–1	0–1	3–4	1–2	1–4	0–2	2–0	2–1	0–1
Athletico Paranaense	3–2	—	1–1	2–0	1–0	1–0	3–2	3–3	2–0	2–1	2–2	1–1	2–0	1–2	2–1	2–2	1–1	3–0	1–1	0–0
Atlético Mineiro	2–2	2–1	—	1–0	1–0	0–1	1–2	0–1	1–0	1–2	2–0	3–1	2–1	3–0	2–0	1–1	1–1	2–0	2–1	1–2
Bahia	3–1	1–1	4–1	—	1–2	0–0	3–1	2–2	0–3	2–3	1–0	2–0	1–1	1–2	1–0	1–0	4–0	1–2	0–1	1–1
Botafogo	2–0	1–1	2–0	3–0	—	3–0	4–1	0–0	0–1	1–2	1–0	2–0	1–1	3–4	3–1	3–4	2–0	1–1	2–1	2–0
Corinthians	1–1	1–0	1–1	1–5	1–0	—	3–1	2–1	1–1	1–1	2–0	1–1	1–1	4–4	1–2	0–0	0–1	1–1	1–1	3–1
Coritiba	3–1	2–0	1–2	2–4	1–1	0–2	—	1–0	0–3	2–3	2–0	0–3	0–1	1–2	0–1	0–2	0–1	0–0	1–1	1–1
Cruzeiro	1–1	1–1	0–1	3–0	0–0	1–1	0–0	—	0–1	0–2	0–2	0–1	0–1	1–0	1–2	1–1	0–0	2–1	1–0	2–2
Cuiabá	2–2	3–0	0–4	1–1	0–1	0–1	1–1	0–0	—	3–0	3–0	2–1	1–1	1–2	0–2	0–2	1–1	3–0	2–1	0–2
Flamengo	1–1	0–3	0–3	1–0	2–3	1–0	3–0	1–1	2–1	—	1–1	2–0	2–0	3–0	0–0	3–0	1–0	1–2	1–1	1–0
Fluminense	3–1	2–0	1–1	2–1	0–2	3–3	2–1	1–0	2–0	0–0	—	1–0	5–3	2–3	2–0	2–1	2–1	1–0	1–0	1–1
Fortaleza	3–2	1–0	2–1	0–0	2–2	2–1	3–1	0–1	0–1	0–2	4–2	—	1–0	1–1	1–1	2–2	0–3	4–0	0–0	2–0
Goiás	1–0	1–1	0–0	4–6	2–1	3–1	1–2	0–1	0–1	0–0	2–2	1–0	—	1–1	0–0	0–5	0–2	0–1	2–0	1–1
Grêmio	3–1	1–2	1–0	1–0	0–2	0–1	5–1	3–0	2–0	3–2	2–1	0–0	2–1	—	3–1	1–0	3–3	1–0	2–1	1–0
Internacional	1–1	0–2	0–2	2–0	3–1	2–2	3–4	0–0	1–2	2–1	0–0	0–1	1–0	3–2	—	0–0	1–0	7–1	2–1	2–1
Palmeiras	4–0	1–0	0–2	1–0	0–1	2–1	3–1	1–0	2–1	1–1	1–0	3–1	1–0	4–1	3–0	—	1–1	1–2	5–0	1–0
Red Bull Bragantino	2–2	2–0	1–2	2–1	2–2	1–0	1–0	0–3	2–0	4–0	1–0	1–2	2–0	2–0	0–0	2–1	—	2–0	0–0	1–1
Santos	3–2	1–1	0–0	3–0	2–2	0–2	2–1	0–3	0–0	2–3	0–3	1–2	4–3	2–1	1–1	0–0	1–3	—	0–0	4–1
São Paulo	3–0	2–1	0–2	0–0	0–0	2–1	2–1	1–0	0–0	1–0	1–0	1–2	2–1	3–0	2–0	0–2	1–0	4–1	—	4–2
Vasco da Gama	2–1	0–2	1–0	0–1	1–0	2–4	5–1	0–1	1–0	1–4	4–2	1–0	0–1	1–0	1–2	2–2	2–1	0–1	0–0	—

Source: CBF
Legend: Blue = home team win; Yellow = draw; Red = away team win.

== Season statistics ==
=== Top scorers ===
Rank	Player	Club	Goals
1	(Brazil) Paulinho	Atlético Mineiro	20
2	(Brazil) Tiquinho Soares	Botafogo	17
2	(Uruguay) Luis Suárez	Grêmio	17
4	(Brazil) Hulk	Atlético Mineiro	15
5	(Brazil) Pedro	Flamengo	13
5	(Brazil) Marcos Leonardo	Santos	13
7	(Brazil) Deyverson	Cuiabá	12
7	(Brazil) Robson	Coritiba	12
7	(Brazil) Vitor Roque	Athletico Paranaense	12
10	(Brazil) Eduardo Sasha	Red Bull Bragantino	11
10	(Uruguay) Gonzalo Mastriani	América Mineiro	11
10	(Brazil) Endrick	Palmeiras	11

Source: Soccerway

=== Top assists ===
Rank	Player	Club	Assists
1	(Uruguay) Luis Suárez	Grêmio	11
1	(Brazil) Hulk	Atlético Mineiro	11
3	(Argentina) Cristian Pavón	Atlético Mineiro	8
3	(Brazil) Gerson	Flamengo	8
5	(Colombia) Jhon Arias	Fluminense	7
5	(Brazil) Raphael Veiga	Palmeiras	7
5	(Brazil) Ganso	Fluminense	7
5	(Brazil) Cauly	Bahia	7
9	(Uruguay) Giorgian de Arrascaeta	Flamengo	6
9	(Brazil) Carlos Eduardo	Botafogo	6
9	(Brazil) Guilherme Marques	Goiás	6
9	(Brazil) Lucas Evangelista	Bragantino	6
9	(Brazil) Mayke	Palmeiras	6
9	(Brazil) Maurício	Internacional	6
9	(Brazil) Thaciano	Bahia	6

Source: Soccerway

=== Clean sheets ===
Rank	Player	Club	Clean sheets
1	(Brazil) Cleiton	Red Bull Bragantino	16
2	(Brazil) Rafael Cabral	Cruzeiro	15
2	(Brazil) Lucas Perri	Botafogo	15
2	(Brazil) Weverton	Palmeiras	15
5	(Brazil) Everson	Atlético Mineiro	14
6	(Brazil) Rafael	São Paulo	13
7	(Brazil) Fábio	Fluminense	12
7	(Brazil) Walter	Cuiabá	12
9	(Brazil) Tadeu	Goiás	10

Source: FBref.com

== Awards ==
=== Monthly awards ===
Month	Player of the month		Ref.
Month	Player	Club	Ref.
April	(Brazil) Tiquinho Soares	Botafogo	
May	(Brazil) Tiquinho Soares	Botafogo	
June	(Brazil) Tiquinho Soares	Botafogo	
July	(Brazil) Tiquinho Soares	Botafogo	
August	(Brazil) Raphael Veiga	Palmeiras	
September	(Argentina) Pablo Vegetti	Vasco da Gama	
October	(Brazil) Alan Patrick	Internacional	

Month	Young Player of the month		Ref.
Month	Player	Club	Ref.
April	(Brazil) Bitello	Grêmio	
May	(Brazil) Lucas Beraldo	São Paulo	
June	(Brazil) Victor Hugo	Flamengo	
July	(Brazil) Vitor Roque	Athletico Paranaense	

Month	Head Coach of the month		Ref.
Month	Coach	Club	Ref.
May	(Portugal) Luís Castro	Botafogo	
June	(Brazil) Renato Gaúcho	Grêmio	
July	(Portugal) António Oliveira	Cuiabá	
August	(Portugal) Abel Ferreira	Palmeiras	
September	(Portugal) Pedro Caixinha	Red Bull Bragantino	
October	(Portugal) Pedro Caixinha	Red Bull Bragantino	

Bola de Prata Team of the Year
Goalkeeper	(Brazil) Weverton (Palmeiras)			
Defenders	(Brazil) Mayke (Palmeiras)	(Brazil) Adryelson (Botafogo)	(Brazil) Murilo Cerqueira (Palmeiras)	(Uruguay) Joaquín Piquerez (Palmeiras)
Midfielders	(Paraguay) Mathías Villasanti (Grêmio)	(Chile) Erick Pulgar (Flamengo)	(Brazil) Raphael Veiga (Palmeiras)	(Uruguay) Giorgian de Arrascaeta (Flamengo)
Forwards	(Uruguay) Luis Suárez (Grêmio)		(Brazil) Hulk (Atlético Mineiro)	

== Attendances ==
Flamengo drew the highest average home attendance in the 2023 edition of the Campeonato Brasileiro Série A.

#	Football club	Home games	Average attendance
1	Flamengo	19	57,984
2	São Paulo FC	19	44,221
3	EC Bahia	19	36,480
4	Corinthians	19	36,398
5	Fortaleza EC	19	33,592
6	Palmeiras	19	33,167
7	Atlético Mineiro	19	33,070
8	Fluminense	19	32,009
9	Grêmio	19	31,721
10	Cruzeiro	19	30,525
11	Botafogo	19	29,398
12	SC Internacional	19	27,326
13	CR Vasco da Gama	19	21,798
14	Athletico Paranaense	19	21,572
15	Coritiba	19	19,206
16	Cuiabá EC	19	16,835
17	Goiás EC	19	10,240
18	Santos FC	19	9,590
19	América FC	19	6,373
20	Red Bull Bragantino	19	6,046
