= Tiller Systems (software) =

Tiller Systems is a cloud-based iPad point of sale (POS) software company headquartered in Paris, France. Since February 2021, it has been a subsidiary of the mobile payments company known as SumUp.

== History ==
March 2014 : The company was created by 4 co-founders Josef Bovet, Scott Gordon, Dimitri Farber and Vincent Oliveira backed by several accelerator programs including NUMA, Startup 42 and ESSEC incubator.

January 2015 : Tiller raised a first round of funding around 100K€ with friends and family in order to start building the product.

April 2015 : Tiller launched commercially and onboard its first clients.

April 2016 : Tiller raises a new round of funding (series A) of 4.5 million euros with 360 Capital Partners, a French-Italian investment fund (invested in Withings, Le Slip Français, Foodchéri...) and a group of business angels among whom Thierry Petit (CEO of Showroom Privé), Damien Guermonprez (CEO of Lemon Way), Céline Lazorthes (Founder and CEO of Leetchi and Mangopay, acquired by the bank Crédit Mutuel Arkéa) and Edouardo Ronzano (Founder of Keldoc).

January 2017 : Tiller opened offices in Barcelona in order to take on the Spanish market with its POS. A year after the launch, Tiller owns 20% market share on the digital POS market and represents a team of 30 people.

February 2017 : Tiller hired Ilham Guerriouni (ex-CFO of Dailymotion) as the global Chief Financial Officer and Christelle Weber (ex-HR Director) as the global Chief People Officer.

September 2017 : Tiller launched La Frégate, the first accelerator program dedicated to entrepreneurs of the restaurant world. This program supports entrepreneurs who want to create one or several restaurants by helping them on their business and culinary challenges, including the business plan, the menu definition, the food providers selection or the communication plan.

October 2017 : Tiller is officially compliant to the new French regulation (law Sapin) by obtaining the certification NF525.

May 2018 : Tiller launched Tiller Live, a mobile-app allowing merchants to monitor their key metrics in real time.

June 2018: Tiller raised 12 million euros from 360 Capital Partners, Ring Capital and Omnes Capital.

May 2019: Tiller acquired Beesniss, a spanish company that owns a restaurant management software.

February 2021: Tiller gets acquired by the London-based mobile payments company SumUp.
