= 2017 Campeonato Brasileiro Série A =

61st season of the main division of Brazilian football

Campeonato Brasileiro Série A
- Season: 2017
- Champions: Corinthians (7th title)
- Relegated: Coritiba; Avaí; Ponte Preta; Atlético Goianiense
- Copa Libertadores: Corinthians; Palmeiras; Santos; Grêmio; Cruzeiro; Flamengo; Vasco da Gama; Chapecoense
- Copa Sudamericana: Atlético Mineiro; Botafogo; Atlético Paranaense; Bahia; São Paulo; Fluminense
- Matches: 380
- Goals: 923 (2.43 per match)
- Top goalscorer: Henrique Dourado; Jô (18 goals)
- Biggest home win: Atlético Paranaense 5–0 Avaí (3 August 2017)
- Biggest away win: Chapecoense 3–6 Grêmio (8 June 2017)
- Longest winning run: Corinthians (6 matches)
- Longest unbeaten run: Corinthians (19 matches)
- Longest winless run: Coritiba (9 matches)
- Longest losing run: Vitória, Coritiba, and Atlético Goianiense (4 matches)
- Highest attendance: 50,116; Grêmio 0–1 Corinthians (25 June)

The 2017 Campeonato Brasileiro Série A was the 61st season of the Campeonato Brasileiro Série A, the top level of professional football in Brazil, and the 15th edition in a double round-robin since its establishment in 2003. The season began on 13 May 2017 and ended on 3 December 2017. The top six teams qualified to Copa Libertadores and the last four were relegated to Série B of 2018.

Corinthians won their seventh title and was the first team in the history of the tournament, since the double round-robin system was established in 2003, to finish the first round undefeated.

== Format ==
For the fifteenth consecutive season, the tournament was played in a double round-robin system. The team with most points at the end of the season was declared champion. The bottom four teams were relegated and will play the 2018 Série B.

=== International qualification ===
The Série A served as a qualifier to CONMEBOL's 2018 Copa Libertadores. The top four teams in the standings qualified to the group stage of the competition, while the fifth and the sixth placed in the standings qualified to the second stage.

And this change also impacted on Copa Sudamericana qualification, whose vacancies were again distributed through league placement instead of the Copa do Brasil.

=== Tiebreakers ===
In case of a tie on points between two or more clubs, tiebreakers were applied in the following order:

1. Number of wins;
2. Goal difference;
3. Goals pro;
4. Head to Head;
5. Fewest red cards;
6. Fewest yellow cards;
7. Draw.

With respect to the fourth criterion (direct confrontation), it is considered the result of the combined game, or the result of 180 minutes. Staying tie, the tie will be made by the greatest number of goals scored in the opponent's field. The fourth criterion is not considered in the case of a tie between more than two clubs.

== Teams ==
Location of teams in 2017 Série A

Twenty teams competed in the league – the top sixteen teams from the previous season, as well as four teams promoted from the Série B.

Atlético Goianiense became the first club to be promoted after a 5–3 win against Tupi MG on 12 November 2016 meant they were guaranteed an automatic place. Avaí became the second club to be promoted, Vasco da Gama became the third club to be promoted, and Bahia became the fourth club to be promoted

Pos.	Relegated from 2016 Série A
17º	Internacional
18º	Figueirense
19º	Santa Cruz
20º	América Mineiro

Pos.	Promoted from 2016 Série B
1º	Atlético Goianiense
2º	Avaí
3°	Vasco da Gama
4º	Bahia

=== Number of teams by state ===
Number of teams	State	Team(s)
5	São Paulo	Corinthians, Palmeiras, Ponte Preta, Santos and São Paulo
4	Rio de Janeiro	Botafogo, Flamengo, Fluminense and Vasco da Gama
2	Bahia	Bahia and Vitória
2	Minas Gerais	Atlético Mineiro and Cruzeiro
2	Paraná	Atlético Paranaense and Coritiba
2	Santa Catarina	Avaí and Chapecoense
1	Goiás	Atlético Goianiense
1	Pernambuco	Sport
1	Rio Grande do Sul	Grêmio

=== Stadiums and locations ===
Team	Location	State	Stadium	Capacity
Atlético Goianiense	Goiânia	Goiás	Olímpico Pedro Ludovico; Serra Dourada (4 matches)	13,500; 41,574
Atlético Mineiro	Belo Horizonte	Minas Gerais	Independência; Mineirão (one match)	23,018; 61,846
Atlético Paranaense	Curitiba	Paraná	Arena da Baixada	42,370
Avaí	Florianópolis	Santa Catarina	Ressacada	17,826
Bahia	Salvador	Bahia	Arena Fonte Nova; Pituaçu (one match)	47,907; 32,157
Botafogo	Rio de Janeiro	Rio de Janeiro	Olímpico Nilton Santos	44,661
Chapecoense	Chapecó	Santa Catarina	Arena Condá	20,089
Corinthians	São Paulo	São Paulo	Arena Corinthians	47,605
Coritiba	Curitiba	Paraná	Couto Pereira; Vila Capanema (one match)	40,502; 17,140
Cruzeiro	Belo Horizonte	Minas Gerais	Mineirão	61,846
Flamengo	Rio de Janeiro	Rio de Janeiro	Luso-Brasileiro; Maracanã (3 matches); Raulino de Oliveira (one match)	20,215; 78,838; 18,230
Fluminense	Rio de Janeiro	Rio de Janeiro	Maracanã; Giulite Coutinho (2 matches)	78,838; 13,544
Grêmio	Porto Alegre	Rio Grande do Sul	Arena do Grêmio; Alfredo Jaconi (one match)	55,662; 19,924
Palmeiras	São Paulo	São Paulo	Allianz Parque; Pacaembu (4 matches)	43,713; 37,730
Ponte Preta	Campinas	São Paulo	Moisés Lucarelli	17,728
Santos	Santos	São Paulo	Vila Belmiro; Pacaembu (6 matches)	16,068; 37,730
São Paulo	São Paulo	São Paulo	Morumbi; Pacaembu (5 matches)	72,039; 37,730
Sport	Recife	Pernambuco	Ilha do Retiro; Arena Pernambuco (2 matches)	32,983; 44,300
Vasco da Gama	Rio de Janeiro	Rio de Janeiro	São Januário; Maracanã (3 matches); Raulino de Oliveira (3 matches); Olímpico Nilton Santos (one match)	24,584; 78,838; 18,230; 44,661
Vitória	Salvador	Bahia	Barradão; Arena Fonte Nova (2 matches)	34,535; 47,907

=== Personnel and kits ===
Team	Manager	Captain	Kit manufacturer	Shirt main sponsor
Atlético Goianiense	(Brazil) João Paulo Sanches	(Brazil) Roger Carvalho	Numer	Caixa
Atlético Mineiro	(Brazil) Oswaldo de Oliveira	(Brazil) Leonardo Silva	Topper	Caixa
Atlético Paranaense	(Brazil) Fabiano Soares	(Brazil) Weverton	Umbro	Caixa
Avaí	(Brazil) Claudinei Oliveira	(Brazil) Marquinhos	Umbro	Caixa
Bahia	(Brazil) Paulo César Carpegiani	(Brazil) Tiago	Umbro	Caixa
Botafogo	(Brazil) Jair Ventura	(Argentina) Joel Carli	Topper	Caixa
Chapecoense	(Brazil) Gilson Kleina	(Brazil) Wellington Paulista	Umbro	Aurora Alimentos
Corinthians	(Brazil) Fábio Carille	(Brazil) Fagner	Nike	None
Coritiba	(Brazil) Marcelo Oliveira	(Brazil) Kléber	Adidas	Caixa
Cruzeiro	(Brazil) Mano Menezes	(Brazil) Fábio	Umbro	Caixa
Flamengo	(Colombia) Reinaldo Rueda	(Brazil) Réver	Adidas	Caixa
Fluminense	(Brazil) Abel Braga	(Brazil) Henrique	Under Armour	Universal Orlando Resort
Grêmio	(Brazil) Renato Gaúcho	(Brazil) Maicon	Umbro	Banrisul
Palmeiras	(Brazil) Alberto Valentim	(Brazil) Dudu	Adidas	Crefisa
Ponte Preta	(Brazil) Eduardo Baptista	(Brazil) Aranha	Adidas	Caixa
Santos	(Brazil) Elano	(Brazil) Ricardo Oliveira	Kappa	Caixa
São Paulo	(Brazil) Dorival Júnior	(Brazil) Hernanes	Under Armour	Banco Inter
Sport	(Brazil) Daniel Paulista (caretaker)	(Brazil) Durval	Adidas	Caixa
Vasco da Gama	(Brazil) Zé Ricardo	(Brazil) Luís Fabiano	Umbro	Caixa
Vitória	(Brazil) Vágner Mancini	(Brazil) Willian Farias	Topper	Caixa

=== Managerial changes ===
Team	Outgoing manager	Manner of departure	Date of vacancy	Position in table	Incoming manager	Date of appointment
Atlético Paranaense	(Brazil) Paulo Autuori	Mutual consent	23 May	19th	(Brazil) Eduardo Baptista	23 May
Sport	(Brazil) Ney Franco	Sacked	25 May	18th	(Brazil) Vanderlei Luxemburgo	29 May
Bahia	(Brazil) Guto Ferreira	Signed by Internacional	29 May	13th	(Brazil) Jorginho	1 June
Vitória	(Serbia) Dejan Petković	Mutual consent	3 June	17th	(Brazil) Alexandre Gallo	3 June
Santos	(Brazil) Dorival Júnior	Sacked	4 June	16th	(Brazil) Levir Culpi	6 June
Atlético Goianiense	(Brazil) Marcelo Cabo	Sacked	5 June	20th	(Brazil) Doriva	7 June
São Paulo	(Brazil) Rogério Ceni	Sacked	3 July	17th	(Brazil) Dorival Júnior	5 July
Chapecoense	(Brazil) Vagner Mancini	Sacked	4 July	15th	(Brazil) Vinícius Eutrópio	5 July
Atlético Paranaense	(Brazil) Eduardo Baptista	Sacked	11 July	14th	(Brazil) Fabiano Soares	12 July
Coritiba	(Brazil) Pachequinho	Sacked	19 July	13th	(Brazil) Marcelo Oliveira	20 July
Atlético Mineiro	(Brazil) Roger Machado	Sacked	20 July	11th	(Brazil) Rogério Micale	21 July
Vitória	(Brazil) Alexandre Gallo	Sacked	20 July	19th	(Brazil) Vágner Mancini	22 July
Atlético Goianiense	(Brazil) Doriva	Sacked	21 July	20th	(Brazil) João Paulo Sanches	
Bahia	(Brazil) Jorginho	Sacked	31 July	14th	(Brazil) Preto Casagrande	
Flamengo	(Brazil) Zé Ricardo	Sacked	6 August	5th	(Colombia) Reinaldo Rueda	14 August
Vasco da Gama	(Brazil) Milton Mendes	Sacked	21 August	17th	(Brazil) Zé Ricardo	
Chapecoense	(Brazil) Vinícius Eutrópio	Sacked	11 September	18th	(Brazil) Gilson Kleina	17 October
Ponte Preta	(Brazil) Gilson Kleina	Sacked	16 September	13th	(Brazil) Eduardo Baptista	20 September
Atlético Mineiro	(Brazil) Rogério Micale	Sacked	24 September	11th	(Brazil) Oswaldo de Oliveira	26 September
Bahia	(Brazil) Preto Casagrande	Sacked	10 October	13th	(Brazil) Paulo César Carpegiani	
Palmeiras	(Brazil) Cuca	Sacked	13 October	5th	(Brazil) Alberto Valentim	13 October

=== Foreign players ===
The clubs can have a maximum of five foreign players in their Campeonato Brasileiro squads per match.

Club	Player 1	Player 2	Player 3	Player 4	Player 5	Player 6
Atlético Goianiense						
Atlético Mineiro	(Ecuador) Frickson Erazo	(Ecuador) Juan Cazares	(Venezuela) Rómulo Otero			
Atlético Paranaense	(Argentina) Lucho González	(Croatia) Eduardo da Silva^{1}	(Chile) Esteban Pavez			
Avaí	(Colombia) Luis Salazar	(Colombia) Bryan Urueña	(Japan) Toshi	(Cameroon) Joel Tagueu		
Bahia	(Colombia) Pablo Armero	(Argentina) Agustín Allione	(Colombia) Stiven Mendoza	(Bolivia) Lucas Bolívia^{1}		
Botafogo	(Argentina) Joel Carli	(Paraguay) Junior Fernández	(Chile) Leonardo Valencia			
Chapecoense	(Uruguay) Emilio Zeballos	(Venezuela) Luis Manuel Seijas	(Ecuador) Cristian Penilla	(Ecuador) Fernando Guerrero	(Argentina) Héctor Canteros	
Corinthians	(Paraguay) Ángel Romero	(Paraguay) Fabián Balbuena	(Turkey) Colin Kazim-Richards			
Coritiba	(Colombia) Yílmar Filigrana	(Germany) Alexander Baumjohann				
Cruzeiro	(Uruguay) Giorgian De Arrascaeta	(Argentina) Ariel Cabral	(Argentina) Lucas Romero			
Flamengo	(Peru) Paolo Guerrero	(Argentina) Federico Mancuello	(Colombia) Gustavo Cuéllar	(Peru) Miguel Trauco	(Colombia) Orlando Berrío	(Argentina) Dario Conca
Fluminense	(Ecuador) Jefferson Orejuela	(Ecuador) Junior Sornoza				
Grêmio	(Argentina) Walter Kannemann	(Peru) Beto da Silva^{1}	(Paraguay) Lucas Barrios	(Ecuador) Michael Arroyo		
Palmeiras	(Colombia) Yerry Mina	(Venezuela) Alejandro Guerra	(Colombia) Miguel Borja			
Ponte Preta	(Portugal) Fábio Braga^{1}	(Qatar) Emerson^{1}	(Bolivia) Luis Alí	(Paraguay) Jorge Mendoza		
Santos	(Colombia) Jonathan Copete	(Argentina) Emiliano Vecchio	(Argentina) Fabián Noguera	(Colombia) Vladimir Hernández		
São Paulo	(Uruguay) Diego Lugano	(Peru) Christian Cueva	(Argentina) Julio Buffarini	(Argentina) Lucas Pratto	(Argentina) Jonathan Gómez	(Ecuador) Robert Arboleda
Sport	(Colombia) Oswaldo Henríquez	(Colombia) Reinaldo Lenis	(Chile) Eugenio Mena			
Vasco da Gama	(Uruguay) Martín Silva	(Argentina) Damián Escudero	(Colombia) Andrés Escobar	(Argentina) Andrés Ríos		
Vitória	(Colombia) Santiago Tréllez					

- ^{1} Players holding Brazilian dual nationality.

== Results ==
=== League table ===
Pos	Team	Pld	W	D	L	GF	GA	GD	Pts	Qualification or relegation
1	Corinthians (C)	38	21	9	8	50	30	+20	72	Qualification for Copa Libertadores group stage
2	Palmeiras	38	19	6	13	61	45	+16	63	Qualification for Copa Libertadores group stage
3	Santos	38	17	12	9	42	32	+10	63	Qualification for Copa Libertadores group stage
4	Grêmio	38	18	8	12	55	36	+19	62	Qualification for Copa Libertadores group stage
5	Cruzeiro	38	15	12	11	47	39	+8	57	Qualification for Copa Libertadores group stage
6	Flamengo	38	15	11	12	49	38	+11	56	Qualification for Copa Libertadores group stage
7	Vasco da Gama	38	15	11	12	40	47	−7	56	Qualification for Copa Libertadores second stage
8	Chapecoense	38	15	9	14	47	49	−2	54	Qualification for Copa Libertadores second stage
9	Atlético Mineiro	38	14	12	12	52	49	+3	54	Qualification for Copa Sudamericana first stage
10	Botafogo	38	14	11	13	45	42	+3	53	Qualification for Copa Sudamericana first stage
11	Atlético Paranaense	38	14	9	15	45	43	+2	51	Qualification for Copa Sudamericana first stage
12	Bahia	38	13	11	14	50	48	+2	50	Qualification for Copa Sudamericana first stage
13	São Paulo	38	13	11	14	48	49	−1	50	Qualification for Copa Sudamericana first stage
14	Fluminense	38	11	14	13	50	53	−3	47	Qualification for Copa Sudamericana first stage
15	Sport	38	12	9	17	46	58	−12	45	
16	Vitória	38	11	10	17	50	58	−8	43	
17	Coritiba (R)	38	11	10	17	42	51	−9	43	Relegation to Campeonato Brasileiro Série B
18	Avaí (R)	38	10	13	15	29	48	−19	43	Relegation to Campeonato Brasileiro Série B
19	Ponte Preta (R)	38	10	9	19	37	52	−15	39	Relegation to Campeonato Brasileiro Série B
20	Atlético Goianiense (R)	38	9	9	20	38	56	−18	36	Relegation to Campeonato Brasileiro Série B

Source: CBF
Rules for classification: 1) points; 2) wins; 3) goal difference; 4) goals scored; 5) head-to-head results; 6) least red cards received; 7) least yellow cards received; 8) draw.
(C) Champions; (R) Relegated

=== Result table ===
Home \ Away	ATG	CAM	CAP	AVA	BAH	BOT	CHA	COR	CTB	CRU	FLA	FLU	GRE	PAL	PON	SAN	SPA	SPT	VAS	VIT
Atlético Goianiense		1–2	0–1	3–1	1–1	1–1	1–1	0–1	1–0	1–2	0–3	1–1	0–1	1–3	3–0	1–1	0–1	2–0	0–1	1–2
Atlético Mineiro	3–2		0–1	1–0	0–2	0–0	2–3	0–2	3–0	3–1	2–0	1–2	4–3	1–1	2–2	0–1	1–0	2–2	1–2	1–3
Atlético Paranaense	2–2	0–2		5–0	4–1	0–0	0–0	0–1	1–1	0–2	1–1	3–1	0–2	3–0	0–2	0–2	1–0	2–1	3–1	4–1
Avaí	0–2	1–1	1–0		1–2	1–1	1–0	0–0	1–4	1–0	1–1	0–3	2–2	2–1	0–0	0–0	1–1	1–0	1–2	0–0
Bahia	3–0	2–2	6–2	1–1		1–2	0–1	2–0	1–1	1–0	0–1	1–1	1–0	2–4	2–0	3–1	2–1	1–3	3–0	2–1
Botafogo	1–2	1–1	0–1	0–2	1–0		2–1	2–1	2–2	2–2	2–0	1–2	1–0	1–2	2–0	2–0	3–4	2–1	3–1	2–3
Chapecoense	1–2	0–1	1–1	2–0	1–1	0–2		0–1	2–1	1–2	0–1	2–0	3–6	1–0	1–0	2–0	2–0	1–1	2–1	2–1
Corinthians	0–1	2–2	2–2	1–0	3–0	1–0	1–1		3–1	1–0	1–1	3–1	0–0	3–2	2–0	2–0	3–2	3–1	1–0	0–1
Coritiba	4–1	0–2	1–0	4–0	0–0	2–3	2–0	0–0		1–0	1–0	1–2	0–1	1–0	1–1	0–0	1–2	0–3	2–2	0–1
Cruzeiro	2–0	1–3	1–0	2–2	1–0	0–0	0–2	1–1	2–0		1–1	3–1	3–3	3–1	2–1	1–1	1–0	2–0	0–1	0–0
Flamengo	2–0	1–1	2–0	1–1	4–1	0–0	5–1	3–0	2–1	2–0		1–1	0–1	2–2	2–0	1–2	2–0	2–0	0–0	0–2
Fluminense	3–1	2–1	1–1	1–0	1–1	0–1	3–3	0–1	2–2	1–1	2–2		0–2	0–1	2–0	3–2	3–1	1–2	0–1	2–1
Grêmio	1–1	2–0	0–0	0–2	1–0	2–0	0–1	0–1	2–0	0–1	3–1	1–0		1–3	3–1	1–1	1–0	5–0	2–0	1–1
Palmeiras	1–0	0–0	0–1	2–0	2–2	2–0	0–2	0–2	1–0	2–2	2–0	3–1	1–0		2–0	0–1	4–2	5–1	4–0	4–2
Ponte Preta	1–3	1–2	2–1	1–2	0–3	2–1	3–2	1–0	4–0	1–0	1–0	0–0	0–1	1–2		1–1	1–0	4–0	0–0	2–3
Santos	1–0	3–1	1–0	1–1	3–0	1–0	1–0	2–0	1–0	0–1	3–2	0–0	1–0	1–0	0–0		3–2	0–1	1–2	2–2
São Paulo	2–2	1–2	2–1	2–0	1–1	0–0	2–2	1–1	1–2	3–2	2–0	1–1	1–1	2–0	2–2	2–1		1–0	1–0	2–0
Sport	4–0	1–1	1–0	0–1	1–0	1–2	3–0	1–0	3–4	1–1	2–0	2–2	4–3	0–2	0–0	1–1	0–0		1–1	1–3
Vasco da Gama	1–0	1–1	0–1	1–0	2–1	1–0	1–1	2–5	1–1	0–3	0–1	3–2	1–0	1–1	2–1	0–0	1–1	2–1		1–1
Vitória	1–1	2–0	2–3	0–1	0–0	2–2	1–2	0–1	0–1	1–1	1–2	2–2	1–3	3–1	3–1	0–2	1–2	1–2	1–4	

Source: CBF
Legend: Blue = home team win; Yellow = draw; Red = away team win.

== Season statistics ==
=== Top scorers ===
As of matches played on 3 December 2017

Rank	Player	Club	Goals
1	(Brazil) Henrique Dourado	Fluminense	18
1	(Brazil) Jô	Corinthians	18
3	(Brazil) André	Sport	16
4	(Brazil) Lucca	Ponte Preta	13
5	(Brazil) Fred	Atlético Mineiro	12
5	(Brazil) Edigar Junio	Bahia	12
7	(Brazil) Diego Souza	Sport	11
7	(Brazil) Thiago Neves	Cruzeiro	11
9	(Brazil) Diego	Flamengo	10
9	(Brazil) Roger	Botafogo	10
9	(Colombia) Santiago Tréllez	Vitória	10

=== Assists ===
As of matches played on 3 December 2017

Rank	Player	Club	Assists
1	(Brazil) Gustavo Scarpa	Fluminense	12
2	(Brazil) Bruno Henrique	Santos	11
3	(Brazil) Rodrigo Pimpão	Botafogo	9
4	(Argentina) Agustín Allione	Bahia	8
4	(Ecuador) Juan Cazares	Atlético Mineiro	8
4	(Brazil) Reinaldo	Chapecoense	8
4	(Brazil) Thiago Carleto	Coritiba	8
8	(Peru) Christian Cueva	São Paulo	7
8	(Brazil) Éverton	Flamengo	7
8	(Brazil) Thiago Neves	Cruzeiro	7

=== Hat-tricks ===
Player	For	Against	Result	Date	Ref.
(Brazil) André	Sport Recife	Grêmio	4–3	28 May 2017	
(Brazil) Everton	Grêmio	Chapecoense	6–3	8 June 2017	
(Peru) Paolo Guerrero	Flamengo	Chapecoense	5–1	23 June 2017	
(Colombia) Jonathan Copete	Santos	São Paulo	3–2	9 July 2017	
(Brazil) Bruno Henrique	Santos	Bahia	3–0	23 July 2017	

=== Clean sheets ===
As of matches played on 3 December 2017

Rank	Player	Club	Clean sheets
1	(Brazil) Vanderlei	Santos	17
2	(Brazil) Cássio	Corinthians	16
3	(Brazil) Aranha	Ponte Preta	12
3	(Brazil) Marcelo Grohe	Grêmio	12
5	(Brazil) Fábio	Cruzeiro	11
5	(Brazil) Jandrei	Chapecoense	11
7	(Brazil) Douglas Friedrich	Avaí	10
7	(Paraguay) Gatito Fernández	Botafogo	10
7	(Brazil) Jean	Bahia	10
7	(Uruguay) Martín Silva	Vasco da Gama	10
7	(Brazil) Wilson	Coritiba	10
12	(Brazil) Weverton	Atlético Paranaense	9

== Attendances ==
#	Football club	Home games	Average attendance
1	Corinthians	19	40,043
2	São Paulo FC	19	35,395
3	Palmeiras	19	29,912
4	EC Bahia	19	21,650
5	Grêmio	19	19,958
6	Atlético Mineiro	19	15,310
7	Flamengo	19	15,038
8	Cruzeiro	19	15,030
9	Fluminense	19	14,924
10	Sport Recife	19	14,790
11	Coritiba	19	14,592
12	Atlético Paranaense	19	14,419
13	CR Vasco da Gama	19	12,841
14	Santos FC	19	12,034
15	EC Vitória	19	11,150
16	Botafogo	19	10,760
17	Chapecoense	19	10,189
18	Avaí FC	19	7,629
19	AA Ponte Preta	19	6,352
20	Atlético Goianiense	19	6,341

== Awards ==
=== Annual awards ===
Award	Winner	Club
Prêmio Craque do Brasileirão Player of the Year	(Brazil) Jô	Corinthians
Prêmio Craque do Brasileirão Coach of the Year	(Brazil) Fábio Carille	Corinthians
Prêmio Craque do Brasileirão Rookie of the Year	(Brazil) Arthur	Grêmio
Prêmio Craque do Brasileirão Rookie Coach of the Year	(Brazil) Fábio Carille	Corinthians
Prêmio Craque do Brasileirão Fan Player of the Year	(Brazil) Hernanes	São Paulo FC
Top Scorer	(Brazil) Jô (Brazil) Henrique Dourado	Corinthians; Fluminense
Goal of the Year	(Brazil) Hernanes	São Paulo FC

Série A Team of the Year
Goalkeeper	(Brazil) Vanderlei (Santos FC)			
Defence	(Brazil) Fagner (Corinthians)	(Brazil) Pedro Geromel (Grêmio)	(Paraguay) Fabián Balbuena (Corinthians)	(Brazil) Guilherme Arana (Corinthians)
Midfield	(Brazil) Bruno Silva (Botafogo)	(Brazil) Arthur (Grêmio)	(Brazil) Hernanes (São Paulo FC)	(Brazil) Thiago Neves (Cruzeiro)
Attack	(Brazil) Henrique Dourado (Fluminense)		(Brazil) Jô (Corinthians)	
