= Mário Henrique =

Brazilian football coach (born 1980)

Personal information
- Full name: Mário Henrique de Souza Rocha
- Date of birth: 31 January 1980 (age 46)
- Place of birth: Ribeirão Preto, Brazil

Team information
- Current team: Azuriz U20 (head coach)

Managerial career
- Years: Team
- 2007: Mixto (assistant)
- 2008: Rondonópolis (assistant)
- 2012: Tanabi U17
- 2013: Mirassol U17
- 2013: Mixto (assistant)
- 2015: Barretos (assistant)
- 2015: Comercial-SP (assistant)
- 2016–2017: Novorizontino U17
- 2018–2019: Novorizontino U20
- 2019: Mirassol U17
- 2020: Mirassol U20
- 2020–2021: Cuiabá (assistant)
- 2021: Cruzeiro U17
- 2022: Cruzeiro U20
- 2022: Goiás U17
- 2023: Goiás U20
- 2023: Goiás (interim)
- 2024–: Azuriz U20

Mário Henrique de Souza Rocha (born 31 January 1980), known as Mário Henrique, is a Brazilian professional football coach, currently the head coach of Azuriz' under-20 team.

== Career ==
Born in Ribeirão Preto, São Paulo, Mário Henrique began his career as an assistant of Mixto and Rondonópolis, before working as an under-17 coach at Tanabi and Mirassol. He returned to Mixto in 2013, being later a fitness coach of Rio Preto and Itumbiara during the 2014 campaign.

In 2016, after being an assistant at Barretos and Comercial-SP, Mário Henrique became the under-17 coach of Novorizontino. After working with the under-20 squad, he returned to Mirassol and their under-17 team in 2019; in November of that year, he took over the under-20s.

In December 2020, Mário Henrique was an interim head coach of Cuiabá during two Campeonato Mato-Grossense matches against Luverdense. On 3 February 2021, he was named coach of the under-17 side of Cruzeiro.

On 14 February 2022, after a period in charge of the under-20s, Mário Henrique was dismissed by Cruzeiro. Eight days later, he joined the under-17 squad of Goiás to work as their coach.

Promoted to the under-20 squad of the Esmeraldino in November 2022, Mário Henrique was named interim head coach of the main squad for the remaining matches of the 2023 Série A on 14 November, replacing sacked Armando Evangelista.

== Honours ==
Goiás U20

- Campeonato Goiano de Futebol Sub-20: 2023
