= Felipe Endres =

Brazilian football manager

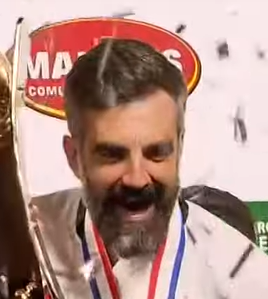
- Endres in 2022

Personal information
- Full name: Felipe Paiva Endres
- Date of birth: 8 August 1981 (age 45)
- Place of birth: Porto Alegre, Brazil

Managerial career
- Years: Team
- 2001–2004: Internacional (youth)
- 2006–2007: Tirsense U17
- 2007–2008: Boavista U17 (assistant)
- 2008–2009: Porto Alegre (assistant)
- 2010–2011: Porto Alegre U20
- 2012: Caxias U20
- 2012–2013: Juventude U17
- 2013: South Melbourne U21
- 2014: Juventude (assistant)
- 2015–2016: Juventude U20
- 2016–2017: Grêmio U23
- 2018: Deportivo Capiatá (assistant)
- 2018–2019: Pelotas (assistant)
- 2019: Pelotas
- 2020–2021: Chapecoense (assistant)
- 2021: Chapecoense (interim)
- 2021: Chapecoense (interim)
- 2021: Chapecoense (interim)
- 2022: Atlético Goianiense (assistant)
- 2023: Grêmio (women)
- 2023: Santos (assistant)

Felipe Paiva Endres (born 8 August 1981) is a Brazilian football coach.

== Career ==
Endres began his career at Internacional's youth setup in 2001. He subsequently worked in the under-17 squads of Portuguese sides Tirsense and Boavista before returning to Brazil in 2008, to work as an assistant manager of Porto Alegre.

In 2011, after working as an under-20 manager of Porto Alegre, Endres was named manager of the same category of Caxias. He was fired by the club in December of that year, and subsequently took over Juventude's under-17 squad in the following March.

In February 2013, Endres moved to Australia and took over South Melbourne's under-21 team. He returned to Ju in 2014, as an assistant of Roger Machado, and was subsequently named manager of the club's under-20s in September 2015.

On 20 January 2016, Endres left Juventude and joined Grêmio to work as an under-23 manager. In 2017, he was in charge of the team for two Primeira Liga matches, against Ceará and Cruzeiro.

On 4 October 2017, after being knocked out of the year's Copa FGF, Endres was sacked. He subsequently worked as Diego Gavilán's assistant at Deportivo Capiatá and Pelotas.

Endres subsequently replaced Gavilán at the helm of Pelotas on 18 June 2019, but was sacked on 3 October. In February 2020, he was named assistant of Umberto Louzer at Chapecoense.

Endres was also interim of Chape on three occasions during the 2021 campaign, being in charge of the club after Louzer, Mozart and Pintado left the club. He left the club in December 2021, and worked as an assistant of Louzer at Atlético Goianiense for three months in the 2022 season.

On 6 January 2023, Endres returned to Grêmio and was named head coach of the women's team. He stepped down from the role on 23 June, to join Paulo Turra's staff at Santos.

== Managerial statistics ==
As of 24 June 2023.

Managerial record by team and tenure
Team	Nat	From	To	Record								Ref
Team	Nat	From	To	G	W	D	L	GF	GA	GD	Win %	Ref
Grêmio (Note: He was in charge of a under-21 side during one match of the 2017 Primeira Liga, as the main squad opted not to play the match.)	(Brazil)	2 March 2017	2 March 2017	1	0	1	0	1	1	+0	0.00	
Grêmio	(Brazil)	30 August 2017	30 August 2017	1	0	0	1	0	2	−2	0.00	
Pelotas	(Brazil)	18 June 2019	3 October 2019	6	4	1	1	11	3	+8	66.67	
Chapecoense (interim)	(Brazil)	17 January 2021	17 January 2021	1	0	1	0	0	0	+0	0.00	
Chapecoense (interim)	(Brazil)	14 April 2021	21 April 2021	2	1	1	0	7	2	+5	50.00	
Chapecoense (interim)	(Brazil)	27 May 2021	2 June 2021	2	1	0	1	3	4	−1	50.00	
Chapecoense (interim)	(Brazil)	26 October 2021	9 December 2021	10	0	2	8	3	18	−15	0.00	
Grêmio (women)	(Brazil)	6 January 2023	23 June 2023	15	6	1	8	16	22	−6	40.00	
Total				38	12	7	19	41	52	−11	31.58	—
