= Thierry Petit =

French entrepreneur

- Born: 12 May 1973 (age 53); Nevers, France
- Education: Institut National des Télécommunications
- Occupation: Entrepreneur
- Known for: Co-founder and co-CEO of French company showroomprive.com
- Children: 3

Thierry Petit (born May 12, 1973 in Nevers) is a French entrepreneur, known as the co-founder and co-CEO of showroomprive.com, created in 2006. He is also the vice-President of France Digitale and a business angel engaged in the French online economy.

== Early life ==
Born into a working-class family, Thierry Petit grew up in the Nièvre department of France before beginning his studies at the Institut National des Télécommunications (now known as Télécom SudParis).

== Career ==
A trained engineer, he began working in 1995 for interactive agencies like Planète Interactive and Brainsoft. However, at a young age, Thierry Petit threw himself into entrepreneurship and in September 1999 he created the first French price comparison site on the web, Toobo.com, which was met with immediate success, before being sold a few months later to Liberty Surf for €15 million.

After this first entrepreneurial success, Thierry Petit decided in 2002 to take over the management of the performance art magazine Mouvement. An admirer of dance, this experience allowed him to also discover the publishing market which up until this point had been unknown ground for him. Previously in economic difficulty, the magazine turned its fortunes around thanks to a new business model and numerous partnerships.

In 2004, Thierry Petit fulfilled another dream: to travel around the world for two years with his wife.

=== Showroomprive.com ===
Upon returning to France, Thierry Petit met David Dayan, a recognised specialist of destocking and the then president of France Export. Already competing with vente-privee.com (known at the time as Cofotex) on the physical market, Dayan was looking to launch an online venture and joined forces with Petit to benefit from his digital expertise. Showroomprive.com is officially launched in October 2006.

=== Look Forward ===
Thierry Petit founded Look Forward, an incubator for showroomprive.com focused on fashion and technology. It was inaugurated on 8 June 2015 in the presence of Axelle Lemaire, the Minister of State for Digital Affairs. Each year, Look Forward selects and hosts approximately ten start-ups that aim to change fashion production, distribution, and consumption.

In February 2016, to further promote innovative initiatives in the retail and fashion domains, Thierry Petit launched the first edition of the FashionTech Festival in partnership with the Gaîté Lyrique. On the event's programme: exhibitions, discussions, workshops, as well as a prize-giving ceremony to award four promising and visionary projects chosen by the Look Forward jury. The second edition of the festival will take place in June 2017 in Paris.

=== Business angel ===
A player in the French entrepreneurial ecosystem, Thierry Petit is an important business angel in the digital sector. According to Challenges, he was the 9th most active French business angel in 2016. He has notably invested in many online companies and actively participates in their development: Avisdemaman, TagCommander, ALittleMarket, Vinted, Soubis, DoYouBuzz, Platypus, RedVisitor, storeretail, Testamento, CarnetdeMode, YouMiam, BrocanteLab, Back Market, ABTasty, Bonnegueule, Blablacar, Sigfox, talent.io, Tiller, Lendix, Whelp, Cubyn, Afrikrea etc. In total, Thierry Petit has financed more than 30 start-ups principally active in the e-commerce field.

In May 2015, he, along with other heads of online companies, launched the "Reviens Léon, on innove à la maison!" movement in order to entice expatriate French entrepreneurs to return and work in France.

=== France Digitale ===
Thierry Petit is the vice-president of France Digitale, an association that brings together digital entrepreneurs and investors in France.

== Recognition ==
In 1999, Thierry Petit received the Prix Microsoft for "the best internet application of year" after creating the L'Oréal group website.

== Private life ==
Thierry Petit is married and has three children.
