= Toshiya Tojo =

Japanese footballer

Toshi
Personal information
- Full name: Toshiya Tojo
- Date of birth: 13 October 1992 (age 34)
- Place of birth: Tokyo, Japan
- Height: 1.73 m (5 ft 8 in)
- Position: Forward

Team information
- Current team: Friburguense

Youth career
- 2011–2012: Kawasaki Frontale

Senior career*
Years	Team	Apps	(Gls)
2012–2014	Friburguense	13	(1)
2014–2017	Avaí	11	(0)
2018	Inter de Lages	9	(0)
2018	Friburguense	6	(1)
2019–2020	Portuguesa	1	(0)
2019–2020	→ Friburguense (loan)	33	(9)
2020	Portuguesa-RJ	1	(0)
2021–	Friburguense	15	(1)
- * Club domestic league appearances and goals as of 5 September 2023

Toshiya Tojo (東城 利哉, Tōjō Toshiya; born 13 October 1992), commonly known as Toshi, is a Japanese professional footballer who plays as forward for Brazilian club Friburguense, on loan from Portuguesa.
