= Showroomprive.com =

French e-commerce company

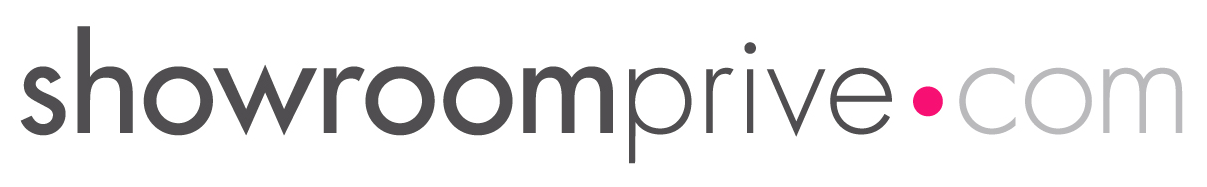
- Type: Public company
- Industry: Online retail
- Founded: 2006
- Founders: Thierry Petit, David Dayan
- Headquarters: La Plaine Saint-Denis, France
- Revenue: ▲€442,8M (2015); +27% vs 2014
- Number of employees: 885 (2015)
- Website: www.showroomprive.com

Showroomprive.com is a French e-commerce company that specializes in online flash sales. Founded in 2006, the website offers daily exclusive sales in France and in 8 other European countries. As of 2016, the company has reached more than 26 million members.

In 2015, the net revenue of Showroomprivé reached €443M, with an average annual growth rate of 28%. The company has a net revenue goal of €750M by 2018.

== History ==
=== Founders ===
Showroomprive.com was launched in France in 2006 by Thierry Petit and David Dayan, two entrepreneurs with two different backgrounds, one in fashion and the other in digital technology.

Thierry Petit graduated in engineering and has worked in business for more than 20 years. Petit created the first price comparator in France, Toobo.com. He is also known to be the Vice President of the France Digitale association.

David Dayan has been working in fashion retail since he was a teenager. He started in his family outlet business and became CEO of France Export before creating Showroomprivé with Thierry Petit.

=== Investment ===
In 2010, the American venture capital firm Accel Partners bought into the capital of Showroomprivé for €37M. On 29 October 2015, the company was listed on the Euronext stock market and rose €256M through its IPO. Its market capitalisation reaches €665M at the end of 2015.

=== International expansion ===
In 2010, the company settled in Spain. The group is now present in Italy (2011), in the UK (2011), in the Netherlands (2012), in Portugal (2013), in Belgium (2013), in Poland (2013) and in Germany (2015).

The international markets represented 15% of the net internet revenues in 2015.

In October 2016, Showroomprivé acquired Saldi Privati, the second actor in online private sales in Italy, for €28M.

== Organisation ==
Showroomprivé now has more than 800 employees in France and abroad:

- La Plaine Saint-Denis
- Saint-Witz
- Roubaix
- Vendée
- Madrid and Barcelona
- Milan

The logistics are managed by Dispeo, Showroomprivé's partner since 2014.
