= SumUp =

Financial technology company

SumUp Payments Limited
- Type: Private company
- Industry: Financial Technology
- Founded: 2012; 14 years ago
- Headquarters: London, United Kingdom
- Area served: 38 countries
- Products: Payment terminals, point of sale systems, gift cards, online store software, banking software
- Website: sumup.co.uk

SumUp is a British financial technology company headquartered in London. SumUp’s primary product is an EMV card reader and a number of online payment and bank account system for merchants and businesses.

It has over 18 offices across Europe and America. As of 2022, SumUp supports more than 3.5 million merchants in over 30 markets worldwide, and operates business tools created specifically for the micro and nano segment.

== History ==
=== Foundation and early years ===
The idea of SumUp was conceived in 2011, and the company was founded in 2012. Investors include Goldman Sachs, Temasek, Bain Capital Credit, Crestline, Oaktree Capital Management, American Express, BBVA Ventures and Groupon.

SumUp's first product was officially launched in August 2012.

In April 2016, SumUp announced it would merge with competitor Payleven, a Berlin-based mobile payments provider by Rocket Internet.

In February 2019, SumUp announced its acquisition of the eCommerce platform, Shoplo.

SumUp also acquired Debitoor, a Danish company. Debitoor is an invoicing software for freelancers and SMEs.

In November 2020, SumUp acquired the London-based POS software provider Goodtill, followed by Paris-based Tiller in February 2021, to strengthen its position in the restaurant and hospitality sector.

In February 2021, SumUp further acquired the Lithuanian core banking system provider Paysolut, after a two-years long business partnership between the two companies.

In October 2021, SumUp acquired the California-based customer loyalty startup Fivestars for $317MM. The acquisition allowed SumUp to expand its services to over 70 million consumers and 12,000 businesses in the US and expand its product offering for the end consumer.

=== 2021 - present ===
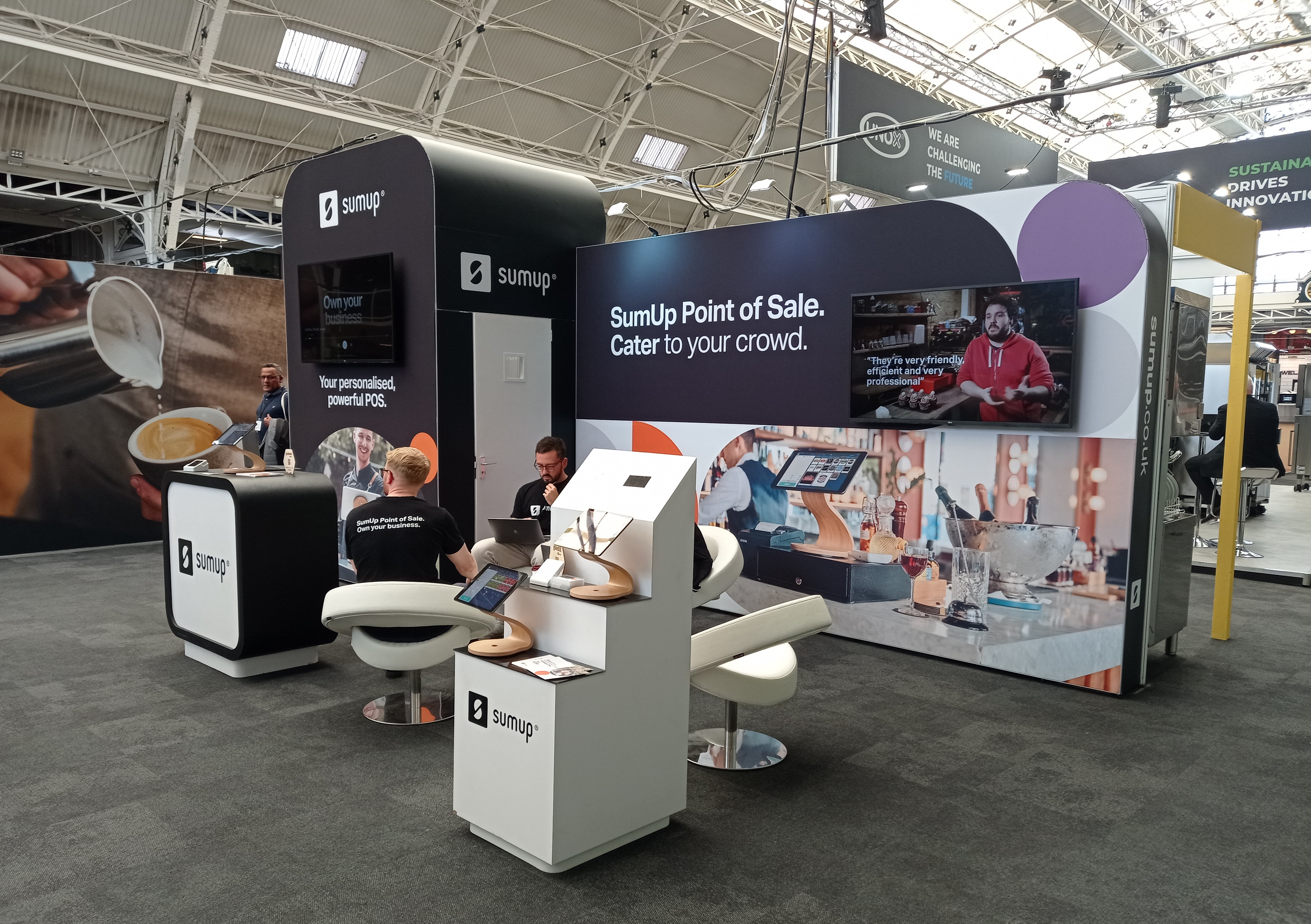
SumUp at Caffè Culture 2022

In March 2021, SumUp raised $895M in debt to double down on its B2C payments business.

Following acquisitions and global expansion, SumUp now has almost 3,000 staff, spread across 23 locations, as of January 2022. In June 2022, the company was valued at around €8 billion in a €590 million funding round and has since become one of Europe's most valuable fintechs.

In May 2024, SumUp secured €1.5 Billion in funding led by Goldman Sachs to expand its global operations.

== Products and services ==
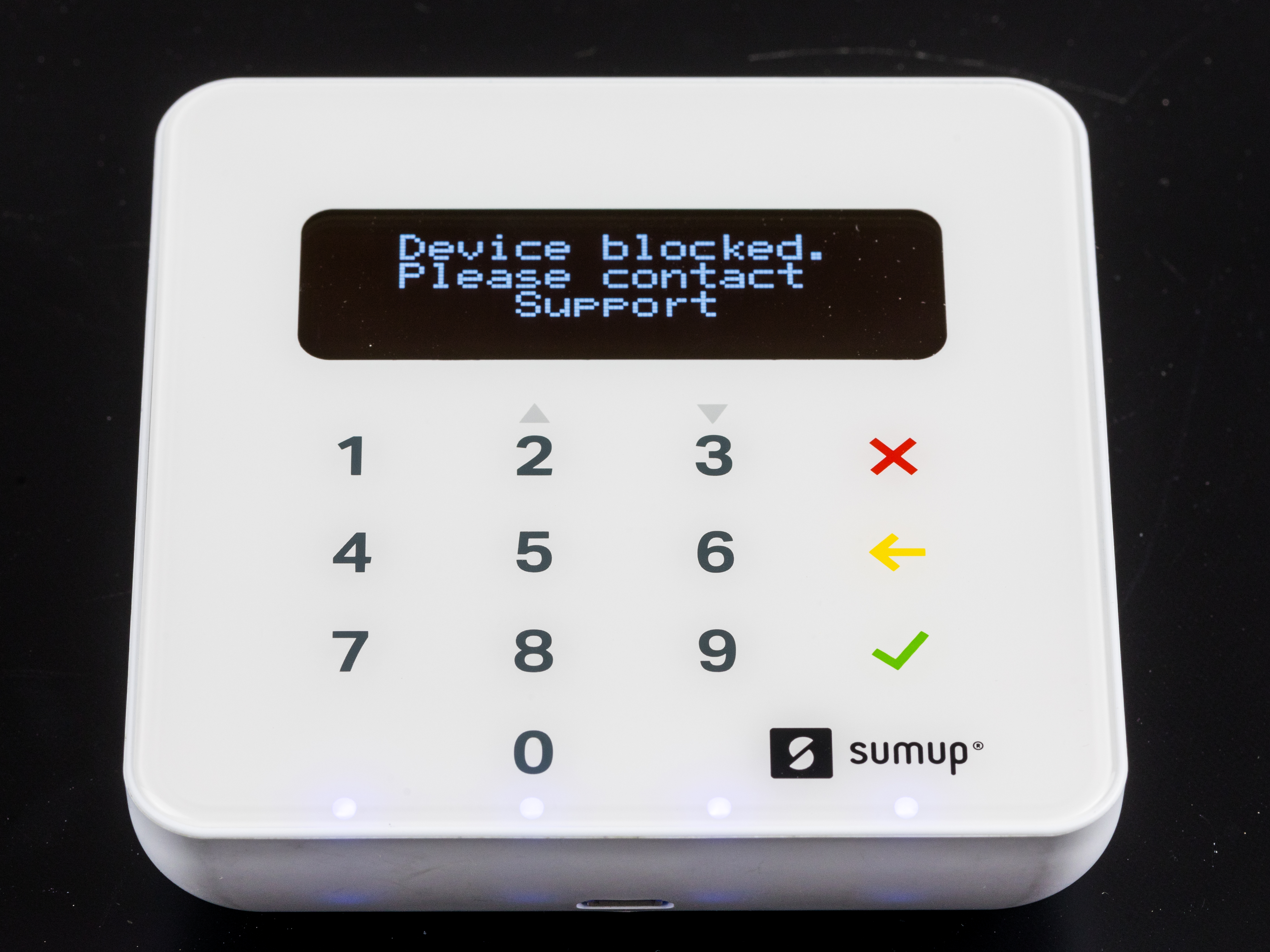
Sumup AIR1 E205

- Chip & PIN and NFC card terminal: SumUp's main product is an EMV card reader which can read magnetic strip, chip ("Chip and Pin"), and RFID/NFC ("contactless") payment cards. The card reader pairs with an Android or iOS-based smartphone or tablet via Bluetooth, to verify payments through the Internet.
- 3G Chip & Pin and NFC card terminal: SumUp's 3G card reader that works without an app. It has a built-in SIM card with data to enable payment processing over a local network connection.
- Point of sale system: As an all-in-one register, the SumUp Point of Sale system "POS register" consists of a SumUp card terminal, a pre-configured iPad, an iPad stand, a receipt printer, a cash drawer and a Wifi router. Only available in Germany and select other countries.Other POS solutions are available via Tiller and Goodtill technologies.
- Payment Links: launched in 2020 to allow small business to get paid safely and remotely via payment links sent via smartphone.
- Gift Cards: launched in 2020 via a partnership with Google, small businesses can use Google My Business to add gift cards directly to their profile.
- Online Store: In 2021 SumUp announced the relaunch of the SumUp Online Store, an e-commerce platform that enables anyone to create an online business for free.
- Business Account: Launched in 2021, this tool is a way for merchants to keep business and personal money completely separate. Merchants can use it to make transfers and receive next-day payout.
- SDKs & APIs: SumUp allows third parties to integrate the end-to-end payment infrastructure as well as card terminals via the SumUp Terminal Payment SDK for iOS and Android as well as several other APIs for developers. Through the integration with the open SumUp platform, third parties can offer card acceptance via their native or browser-based applications. SumUp's SDKs and APIs support acceptance of Visa, VPay, Mastercard, Maestro, American Express, Apple Pay, Android Pay as well as local debit card schemes.

== Global operations ==
As of 2021, SumUp was active in 34 countries and serves more than three million merchants. In August 2012 the company launched its services in Germany, Austria, United Kingdom and Ireland.

In November 2012, Italy, Spain and the Netherlands opened up as new markets. One month later, in December 2012, SumUp expanded to France, Belgium and Portugal. In November 2013, SumUp launched service in Brazil.

Since May 2014, SumUp also operates in Poland and Switzerland. Sweden was launched in September 2015.

Since October 2016, SumUp has been operating in the United States.

In September 2017, SumUp launched its service in 15 European countries - Bulgaria, Cyprus, Czech Republic, Denmark, Estonia, Finland, Greece, Hungary, Latvia, Lithuania, Luxembourg, Malta, Norway, Slovakia and Slovenia.

In November 2017, SumUp announced a joint venture with Banco del Estado de Chile. The combined business operates under the brand "Compraqui" and is headquartered in Santiago de Chile. As of September 2020, Compraqui is operated 100% by Banco Estado and SumUp's operations in Chile are independent of the public owned bank.
