= João Paulo Sanches =

Brazilian football manager (born 1980)

Personal information
- Full name: João Paulo Imbernom Sanches
- Date of birth: 14 August 1980 (age 46)
- Place of birth: Mirassol, Brazil

Team information
- Current team: Ceará (technical coordinator)

Managerial career
- Years: Team
- 2015–2017: Atlético Goianiense (assistant)
- 2015: Atlético Goianiense (interim)
- 2015: Atlético Goianiense (interim)
- 2015: Atlético Goianiense (interim)
- 2017: Atlético Goianiense (interim)
- 2017–2018: Atlético Goianiense
- 2018: Atlético Goianiense (assistant)
- 2018–2019: Ponte Preta (assistant)
- 2020: Aparecidense
- 2020–2021: Atlético Goianiense (interim)
- 2022–2023: Bahia (technical coordinator)
- 2023–: Ceará (technical coordinator)

João Paulo Imbernom Sanches (born 14 August 1980), known as João Paulo Sanches, is a Brazilian football manager. He is the current technical coordinator of Ceará.

== Career ==
Sanches' first experience as first team manager occurred in February 2015, after Marcelo Chamusca's dismissal. He was in charge for two further spells during the year, replacing Jorginho and Gilberto Pereira.

Sanches returned to his assistant role in 2016, but was again appointed interim manager on 21 July 2017, replacing sacked Doriva. Despite failing to avoid relegation with the club, he was definitely named manager on 3 December.

Sanches went back to the assistant role after the appointment of Claudio Tencati, and subsequently had spells at Ponte Preta (as an assistant) and Aparecidense (as a manager) before returning to Dragão in 2020, as a technical coordinator. On 3 March 2021, after both manager Marcelo Cabo and permanent assistant manager Eduardo Souza left the club, he was named interim manager for the start of the campaign.
