= América–Atlético Mineiro rivalry =

Clássico das Multidões
- América Mineiro Atlético Mineiro
- Location: (Brazil) Belo Horizonte
- First meeting: July 27, 1913; Friendly match Atlético 1–0 América
- Latest meeting: March 1, 2026; Campeonato Mineiro; América 0–0 (2–4 p) Atlético

Statistics
- Total meetings: 431
- Most wins: Atlético Mineiro (212)
- Top scorer: Reinaldo (19)
- All-time series: América Mineiro: 109; Draws: 110; Atlético Mineiro: 212
- Largest victory: May 15, 1952; Friendly match Atlético 2–7 América

The rivalry between América Futebol Clube and Clube Atlético Mineiro, named as "Clássico das Multidões" (English: Crowd's Derby) and also called "Galo versus Coelho" (Rooster vs Rabbit), is a football rivalry from Belo Horizonte, Brazil. The rivalry has a 110-year history, since first match happened in 1913, and it was considered the biggest derby of Minas Gerais for decades. Since América fell back, due to initially refusing to become a professional club, and Cruzeiro surpassed Coelho in popularity – and later, in titles – the derby lost its status as the most important one in the state. However, the rivalry between América and Atlético continued through the years, in decisive matches in the Campeonato Mineiro, in encounters for the Campeonato Brasileiro and even in the Copa Libertadores, in 2022.

== History ==
Atlético Mineiro was founded in 1908 in Belo Horizonte, Minas Gerais; América emerged four years later. According to Atlético, the first derby took place on July 27, 1913, and Galo won 1–0. According to América, the first match between the two clubs happened on November 13, 1913, and ended in a 1–1 draw. The two clubs, alongside Yale, disputed the Taça Bueno Brandão in 1914. It was the first competition organized in the state, and it was won by Atlético. In 1915, Atlético also won the first edition of the Campeonato Mineiro, the state league of Minas Gerais.

Despite Atlético's initial successes, América was the dominant force in the football of Minas Gerais in the first decades, winning the following ten editions of the Campeonato Mineiro. Atlético only won the state league again in 1926. The matches between the two clubs were known as the Clássico das Multidões ("Derby of the Masses") in the early days, as they were the most popular clubs in Belo Horizonte. Atlético Mineiro was founded by liberal, upper-class students, but from an early age it opened its doors to players from every social class, nationality or ethnicity, which earned it a "people's club" status in Belo Horizonte and in the state. América, meanwhile, had a reputation as an elitist club.

In the 1930s, Atlético pioneered professionalization of football in Minas Gerais, whereas América resisted against it. América suffered a setback as a result of its internal disagreements regarding professionalism.

A historical and controversial Campeonato Mineiro final between the two happened in 1948. América won 3–1 with what was known as the "gol do guarda" ("guard goal"). The match took place at Alamaeda, and Atlético had the advantage of a tie to be the champions. When América was winning 2–1, forward Murilinho kicked the ball, after which it bounced on a municipal officer and entered the goal. The goal was confirmed by English referee John Barrick, and América was the champion of the competition after 22 years.

With América's setback in the 1930s and Cruzeiro's rise to prominence since the 1940s, the derby lost its space to the Clássico Mineiro. The rivalry between Atlético and Cruzeiro eventually became the biggest derby in Minas Gerais in the 1960s, after the construction of the Mineirão.

The derby between América and Atlético took place in the Copa Libertadores in the 2022 edition's group stage. The first match at Mineirão ended in a 1–1 draw. Galo won the second game 2–1, played at Arena Independência.

== Statistics ==
=== Head-to-Head record ===
Competition	Matches	América wins	Draws	Atlético wins
Copa Libertadores	2	0	1	1
Campeonato Brasileiro Série A	24	3	9	12
Copa Sul-Minas	1	0	0	1
Primeira Liga	1	0	1	0
Campeonato Mineiro (Note: Wins by w/o are not included in the statistics.) (Note: América's 4–1 win on June 14, 1925 is included in this table as a Campeonato Mineiro game.)	256	57	64	135
Supercampeonato Mineiro	1	0	1	0
Taça Minas Gerais	3	1	0	2
Copa dos Campeões Mineiros	3	1	0	2
Taça Belo Horizonte	4	0	0	4
Copa Belo Horizonte	3	1	1	1
Taça Bueno Brandão	2	0	0	2
Other tournaments and friendly games	131	46	33	52
Total matches	431	109	110	212

=== Records ===
- Largest wins:
  - From América: América 7–2 Atlético (May 15, 1952)
  - From Atlético Mineiro: Atlético 6–1 América (September 11, 1938).
- Top goalscorers:
  - For América: Zuca, 13 goals;
  - For Atlético Mineiro: Reinaldo, 19 goals.
- Biggest unbeaten runs:
  - América: 15 matches (From October 30, 1915, to December 20, 1921)
  - Atlético Mineiro: 29 matches (From January 26, 1974, to March 4, 1979)
- Most consecutive wins:
  - América: 8 wins (From 3 January 1960 to 13 November 1960);
  - Atlético Mineiro: 14 wins (From 26 November 1966 to 28 February 1971).

=== Statistics in the Campeonato Brasileiro Série A ===
- 24 matches
- 3 América wins
- 9 draws
- 12 Atlético wins
- Goals scored by América: 16
- Goals scored by Atlético: 32
- Latest match: América 1–1 Atlético (4 November 2023)
