= Diogo Giacomini =

Brazilian football manager

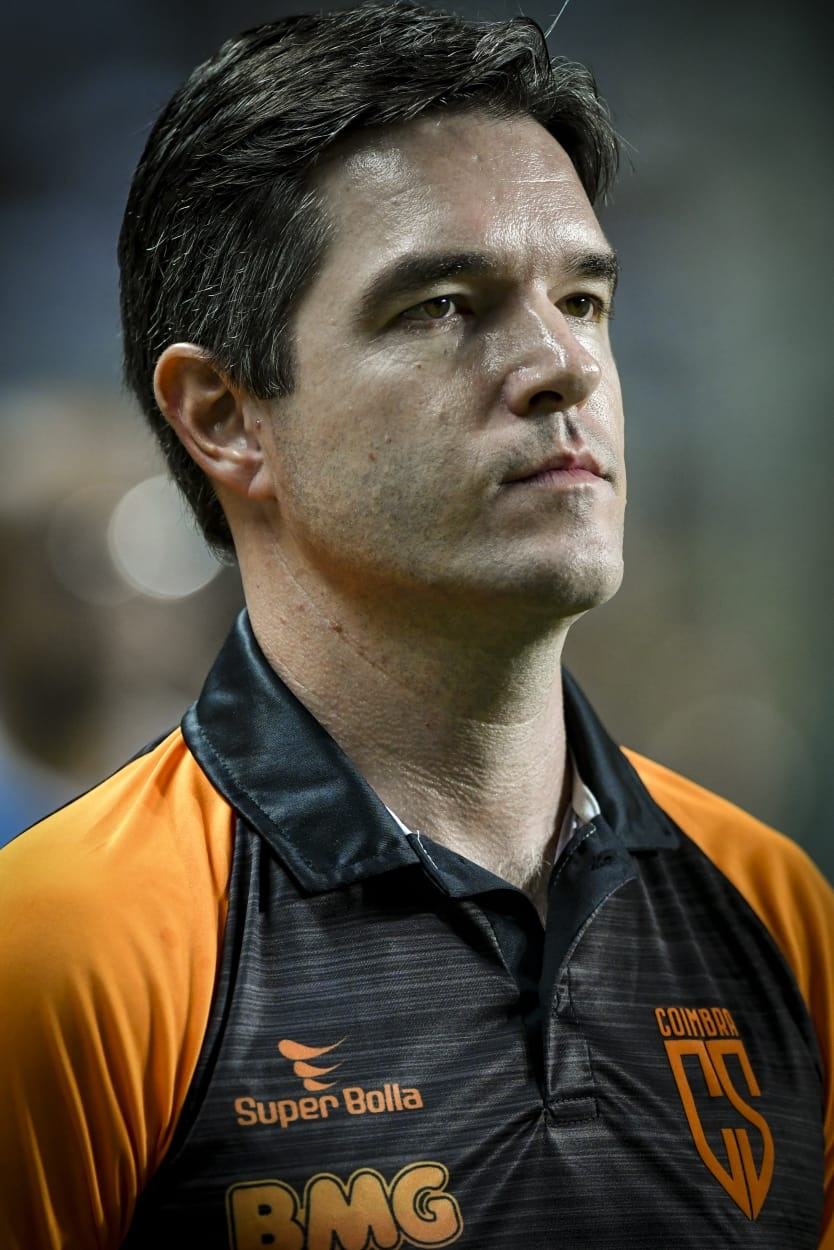
- Giacomini in 2020

Personal information
- Full name: Diogo Schüler Giacomini
- Date of birth: 20 June 1979 (age 47)
- Place of birth: Santa Maria, Brazil

Managerial career
- Years: Team
- 1999–2000: Inter-SM U20 (assistant)
- 2001–2002: Inter-SM (assistant)
- 2004: Olympic (assistant)
- 2005–2006: América Mineiro U15
- 2008–2013: Atlético Mineiro U17
- 2013–2015: Palmeiras U20
- 2015: Cruzeiro U17
- 2015–2016: Atlético Mineiro U20
- 2015: Atlético Mineiro (interim)
- 2016: Atlético Mineiro (interim)
- 2017: Atlético Mineiro (assistant)
- 2018–2021: Coimbra
- 2021–2026: América Mineiro (assistant)
- 2021: América Mineiro (interim)
- 2023: América Mineiro (interim)
- 2023: América Mineiro (interim)
- 2024: América Mineiro (interim)
- 2025: América Mineiro (interim)

Diogo Schüler Giacomini (born 20 June 1979) is a Brazilian football coach.

== Career ==
Born in Santa Maria, Rio Grande do Sul, Giacomini started his career at hometown side Internacional de Santa Maria in 1999, being an assistant of the under-20s and the main squad. He then moved to Minas Gerais to get a master's degree and worked at América Mineiro's youth schools and as an assistant for Olympic.

In May 2005, Giacomini returned to América and was named manager of the under-15s, but left in April 2006 to work at Cruzeiro's scouting area. He then left the latter in December 2007 for rivals Atlético Mineiro, being in charge of the under-17s until April 2013.

On 11 April 2013, Giacomini was presented as Palmeiras' new under-20 manager. He left the club on 10 February 2015, and on 9 May, after a three-month spell at Cruzeiro's under-17s, he returned to Atlético and was named in charge of the under-20s.

On 26 November 2015, Giacomini was named interim manager of Galo, replacing sacked Levir Culpi. He was in charge for the remaining two league matches of the season. He returned to his former role after the arrival of Diego Aguirre, but was again interim after the dismissal of Marcelo Oliveira prior to the second leg of the 2016 Copa do Brasil Finals; he managed to achieve a 1–1 draw against Grêmio, but his side lost 4–2 on aggregate.

For the 2017 season, Giacomini became an assistant manager of the main squad before being dismissed on 13 December of that year. The following 27 January, he was named in charge of Coimbra, achieving two consecutive promotions in the lower divisions of the Campeonato Mineiro, both as champions.

On 11 August 2021, Giacomini returned to América Mineiro, now as a permanent assistant manager of the main squad. He was an interim head coach of the side on two occasions in 2023.

== Personal life ==
Giacomini's father, Luiz Celso, is a former handball manager who managed the Brazil men's national handball team.

== Honours ==
Coimbra

- Campeonato Mineiro Módulo II: 2019
- Campeonato Mineiro Segunda Divisão: 2018
