= Luiz Fernando Iubel =

Brazilian football manager (born 1989)

Personal information
- Full name: Luiz Fernando Iubel
- Date of birth: 13 March 1989 (age 37)
- Place of birth: Curitiba, Brazil

Team information
- Current team: Liverpool (individual lead coach)

College career
Years	Team	Apps	(Gls)
2009–2012	Berea Mountaineers		

Managerial career
- 2015–2017: Bahia (assistant)
- 2018: Ceará (assistant)
- 2018: Vasco da Gama (assistant)
- 2019: Ponte Preta (assistant)
- 2019: Coritiba (assistant)
- 2020: Coritiba (assistant)
- 2020–2021: Juventude (assistant)
- 2021–2022: Cuiabá (assistant)
- 2021: Cuiabá (interim)
- 2021: Cuiabá (interim)
- 2022: Cuiabá (interim)
- 2022–2024: Cuiabá (assistant)
- 2022: Cuiabá (interim)
- 2023: Cuiabá (interim)
- 2024: Cuiabá (interim)
- 2025: Atlético Mineiro (assistant)

Luiz Fernando Iubel (Portuguese pronunciation: [luˈiʃ fˌeɾənˈɐ̃ŋdʊ jubˈɛl]; born 13 March 1989) is a Brazilian football coach, currently the individual development lead coach for Premier League club Liverpool.

== Career ==
Iubel started his career at Coritiba, working in the club’s marketing department before transitioning to the soccer department and becoming an analyst.

Joining Bahia as head of analysis in 2014, Iubel became the assistant coach in the main squad in October 2015. After getting to know Jorginho in his period at Bahia, Iubel subsequently worked as his assistant at Ceará, Vasco da Gama, Ponte Preta and Coritiba (two spells).

On 23 February 2021, after a short stint at Juventude where they won promotion for Serie A in 2020, Iubel was appointed assistant manager at Cuiabá, being also the interim manager of the first team. His first match in charge occurred five days later, a 6–1 Campeonato Mato-Grossense home routing of Poconé.

Iubel returned to his assistant duties after the appointment of Alberto Valentim on 1 April 2021, but was again named interim on 29 May after Valentim was sacked. On 22 January 2022, one day after he took over Cuiabá's first team in the opening match of the campaign, he announced his departure from the club on a mutual agreement.

Iubel returned to Cuiabá on 7 May 2022, and became an interim head coach of the first team for the fourth time five days later, after Pintado was sacked. He returned to the assistant role after the arrival of António Oliveira, but was again named interim on 10 May 2023, replacing fellow Portuguese Ivo Vieira who had just been sacked.

Iubel returned to the assistant role after Oliveira returned, but took over on 7 February 2024, after Oliveira left for Corinthians. As head coach, he won the 2024 Campeonato Mato-Grossense, but left by mutual consent on 29 April.

After leaving Cuiabá, Iubel took a sabbatical to earn his UEFA A License. In March 2025, he joined Atlético Mineiro as an assistant coach, mainly helping the youth players promoted to the main squad.

In August 2025, Iubel was announced as Liverpool's new individual development lead coach, joining manager Arne Slot’s backroom staff from 1 September 2025. In this role, he oversees development across the first team, under-21s, under-18s, and loan players, with a focus on supporting their progression to the senior squad.

== Education and personal life ==
Iubel was born and raised in Curitiba, Brazil. In 2009, he moved to Kentucky in the United States to study at Berea College, where he also played college soccer. In 2012, Iubel graduated from Berea with a bachelor’s degree in Physical Education, with minors in Communication and Business Administration.

Iubel went on to earn an international post-graduate degree in High-Performance Football Coaching from the University of Lisbon’s School of Human Kinetics, a program spearheaded by José Mourinho.

He is a dual citizen of Brazil and Germany.

== Managerial statistics ==
As of 30 April 2024.

Managerial record by team and tenure
Team	Nat	From	To	Record								Ref
Team	Nat	From	To	G	W	D	L	GF	GA	GD	Win %	Ref
Cuiabá (interim)	(Brazil)	23 February 2021	1 April 2021	8	5	3	0	16	3	+13	62.50	
Cuiabá (interim)	(Brazil)	29 May 2021	3 July 2021	6	0	3	3	2	6	−4	0.00	
Cuiabá (interim)	(Brazil)	4 January 2022	22 January 2022	1	1	0	0	3	0	+3	100.00	
Cuiabá (interim)	(Brazil)	12 May 2022	4 June 2022	3	0	1	2	3	5	−2	0.00	
Cuiabá (interim)	(Brazil)	10 May 2023	13 May 2023	1	0	0	1	0	2	−2	0.00	
Cuiabá (interim)	(Brazil)	7 February 2024	29 April 2024	20	11	5	4	36	21	+15	55.00	
Total				39	17	12	10	60	37	+23	43.59	—

== Honours ==
Cuiabá

- Campeonato Mato-Grossense: 2024
