= 2024 Clube Atlético Mineiro season =

Atlético Mineiro
2024 season
- President: Sérgio Coelho
- Head coach: Luiz Felipe Scolari (until 20 March); Lucas Gonçalves (interim, 20–24 March, 4–8 December); Gabriel Milito (24 March – 4 December)
- Stadium: Arena MRV
- Série A: 12th
- Campeonato Mineiro: Winners
- Copa do Brasil: Runners-up
- Copa Libertadores: Runners-up
- Top goalscorer: League: Hulk (10 goals); All: Hulk & Paulinho (19 goals each)
- Average home league attendance: 30,917
Home colours	Away colours	Third colours

The 2024 season was the 110th season in the existence of Clube Atlético Mineiro and the 18th consecutive season in the top flight of Brazilian football. In addition to the national league, Atlético Mineiro participated in this season's editions of the Campeonato Mineiro, the Copa do Brasil and the Copa Libertadores.

== Players ==
As of 22 October 2024.

=== First team squad ===
Note: Flags indicate national team as defined under FIFA eligibility rules; some limited exceptions apply. Players may hold more than one non-FIFA nationality.

No.	Pos.	Nation	Player
1	GK	BRA	Gabriel Delfim
2	DF	BRA	Lyanco
3	DF	BRA	Bruno Fuchs (on loan from CSKA Moscow)
4	DF	URU	Mauricio Lemos
5	MF	BRA	Otávio
6	MF	BRA	Gustavo Scarpa
7	FW	BRA	Hulk (captain)
8	DF	PAR	Júnior Alonso
9	FW	BRA	Deyverson
10	FW	BRA	Paulinho
11	FW	CHI	Eduardo Vargas
13	DF	BRA	Guilherme Arana
14	FW	BRA	Alan Kardec
15	MF	ARG	Matías Zaracho
16	DF	BRA	Igor Rabello
17	MF	BRA	Igor Gomes

No.	Pos.	Nation	Player
18	MF	ARG	Fausto Vera
20	MF	BRA	Bernard
21	MF	ARG	Rodrigo Battaglia
22	GK	BRA	Everson
23	MF	ECU	Alan Franco
25	DF	BRA	Mariano
26	DF	ARG	Renzo Saravia
27	MF	BRA	Paulo Vitor
30	FW	COL	Brahian Palacios
31	GK	BRA	Matheus Mendes
32	GK	BRA	Gabriel Átila
33	MF	BRA	Robert (on loan from Athletic-MG)
42	FW	BRA	Cadu
44	DF	BRA	Rubens
45	FW	BRA	Alisson
47	DF	BRA	Rômulo

=== Other players with first team appearances ===
Note: Flags indicate national team as defined under FIFA eligibility rules; some limited exceptions apply. Players may hold more than one non-FIFA nationality.

No.	Pos.	Nation	Player
39	FW	BRA	Caio Maia
40	MF	BRA	Vitinho

No.	Pos.	Nation	Player
50	DF	BRA	Vitor Gabriel

== Transfers ==
=== In ===
No.	Pos	Player	Transferred from	Fee	Date	Source
6	MF	(Brazil) Gustavo Scarpa	(England) Nottingham Forest	€5,000,000	11 January 2024	
30	FW	(Colombia) Brahian Palacios	(Colombia) Atlético Nacional	€2,700,000	7 March 2024	
33	MF	(Brazil) Robert	Athletic-MG	Loan	27 March 2024	
20	MF	(Brazil) Bernard	Unattached	Free transfer	1 July 2024	
2	DF	(Brazil) Lyanco	(England) Southampton	€4,500,000	5 July 2024	
8	DF	(Paraguay) Júnior Alonso	(Russia) Krasnodar	€1,100,000	10 July 2024	
18	MF	(Argentina) Fausto Vera	Corinthians	€4,500,000	16 July 2024	
9	FW	(Brazil) Deyverson	Cuiabá	€700,000	7 August 2024	

=== Out ===
No.	Pos	Player	Transferred to	Fee	Date	Source
4	DF	(Brazil) Réver	Retired	End of contract	1 January 2024	
20	MF	(Brazil) Hyoran	Unattached	End of contract	1 January 2024	
—	DF	(Brazil) Paulo Henrique	Vasco da Gama	€900,000	1 January 2024	
9	FW	(Argentina) Cristian Pavón	Grêmio	€3,500,000	16 February 2024	
8	MF	(Brazil) Edenílson	Grêmio	Free transfer	19 April 2024	
49	MF	(Brazil) Patrick	Santos	€940,000	19 April 2024	
34	DF	(Brazil) Jemerson	Grêmio	€700,000	22 May 2024	
38	MF	(Brazil) Pedrinho	(Ukraine) Shakhtar Donetsk	Loan return	1 July 2024	
41	FW	(Brazil) Isaac	(Portugal) Nacional	Loan	6 August 2024	

=== Transfer summary ===
Undisclosed fees are not included in the transfer totals.

Expenditure

Total: ▼€18,500,000

Income

Total: ▲€6,040,000

Net total

Total: ▼€12,460,000

== Competitions ==
=== Overview ===
Competition	First match	Last match	Starting round	Final position	Record							
Competition	First match	Last match	Starting round	Final position	Pld	W	D	L	GF	GA	GD	Win %
Campeonato Brasileiro	14 April 2024	8 December 2024	Matchday 1	12th	38	11	14	13	47	54	−7	28.95
Campeonato Mineiro	24 January 2024	7 April 2024	First stage	Winners	12	6	3	3	22	11	+11	50.00
Copa do Brasil	30 April 2024	10 November 2024	Third round	Runners-up	10	4	3	3	12	9	+3	40.00
Copa Libertadores	4 April 2024	30 November 2024	Group stage	Runners-up	13	8	2	3	22	11	+11	61.54
Total					73	29	22	22	103	85	+18	39.73

Source: Soccerway

=== Campeonato Mineiro ===
==== First stage ====
Pos	Team	Pld	W	D	L	GF	GA	GD	Pts	Qualification or relegation
1	Atlético Mineiro	8	4	2	2	14	6	+8	14	Knockout stage
2	Pouso Alegre	8	3	0	5	6	15	−9	9	
3	Uberlândia	8	2	2	4	7	11	−4	8	
4	Villa Nova	8	2	2	4	8	14	−6	8	

Source: FMF

==== Matches ====
24 January 1	Patrocinense	2–1	Atlético Mineiro	Patrocínio
21:30 UTC−3	Everton Kanela 16'; Hudson 73'	Report	Mauricio Lemos 9'	Stadium: Estádio Pedro Alves do Nascimento; Attendance: 3,004; Referee: Felipe Fernandes de Lima

28 January 2	Atlético Mineiro	4–0	Democrata GV	Belo Horizonte
16:00 UTC−3	Mauricio Lemos 9'; Zaracho 16'; Edenílson 42'; Hulk 82'	Report		Stadium: Arena MRV; Attendance: 28,115; Referee: Murilo Francisco Misson Júnior

3 February 3	Atlético Mineiro	0–2	Cruzeiro	Belo Horizonte
19:30 UTC−3		Report	Zé Ivaldo 82'; João Pedro 86'	Stadium: Arena MRV; Attendance: 42,585; Referee: Paulo César Zanovelli da Silva

8 February 4	Athletic Club	0–2	Atlético Mineiro	São João del-Rei
21:00 UTC−3		Report	Hulk 78', 90'	Stadium: Estádio Joaquim Portugal; Attendance: 2,745; Referee: Vinícius Gomes do Amaral

14 February 5	Atlético Mineiro	1–1	Tombense	Belo Horizonte
20:00 UTC−3	Alisson Santana 56'	Report	Ednei 3'	Stadium: Arena MRV; Attendance: 23,479; Referee: Felipe Fernandes de Lima

17 February 6	Itabirito	0–2	Atlético Mineiro	Brasília
16:30 UTC−3		Report	Battaglia 42'; Hulk 90+2'	Stadium: Estádio Nacional Mané Garrincha; Attendance: 10,078; Referee: Daniel da Cunha Oliveira Filho

24 February 7	América Mineiro	1–1	Atlético Mineiro	Belo Horizonte
16:30 UTC−3	Matheusinho 44'	Report	Rubens 90+6'	Stadium: Independência; Attendance: 4,655; Referee: Rodrigo José Pereira de Lima

2 March 8	Atlético Mineiro	3–0	Ipatinga	Belo Horizonte
16:30 UTC−3	Rubens 14'; Cadu 27'; Battaglia 63'	Report		Stadium: Arena MRV; Attendance: 34,988; Referee: Murilo Francisco Misson Júnior

==== Semi-finals ====
9 March First leg	Atlético Mineiro	2–0	América Mineiro	Belo Horizonte
16:30 UTC−3	Paulinho 45'; Hulk 71'	Report		Stadium: Arena MRV; Attendance: 32,445; Referee: Caio Max Augusto Vieira

17 March Second leg	América Mineiro	2–1 (2–3 agg.)	Atlético Mineiro	Belo Horizonte
19:00 UTC−3	Bruno Fuchs 6' (o.g.); Vítor Jacaré 67'	Report	Paulinho 48'	Stadium: Independência; Attendance: 3,942; Referee: André Luiz Skettino Policarpo Bento

==== Finals ====
30 March First leg	Atlético Mineiro	2–2	Cruzeiro	Belo Horizonte
16:30 UTC−3	Bruno Fuchs 8'; Hulk 26'	Report	Jemerson 49' (o.g.); Dinenno 90+5'	Stadium: Arena MRV; Attendance: 42,590; Referee: Felipe Fernandes de Lima

7 April Second leg	Cruzeiro	1–3 (3–5 agg.)	Atlético Mineiro	Belo Horizonte
15:30 UTC−3	Mateus Vital 52'	Report	Saravia 65'; Hulk 77' (pen.); Gustavo Scarpa 90+3'	Stadium: Mineirão; Attendance: 61,582; Referee: Flávio Rodrigues de Souza

=== Copa Libertadores ===
==== Group stage ====
Pos	Team	Pld	W	D	L	GF	GA	GD	Pts	Qualification
1	(Brazil) Atlético Mineiro	6	5	0	1	14	6	+8	15	Advance to round of 16
2	(Uruguay) Peñarol	6	4	0	2	12	5	+7	12	Advance to round of 16
3	(Argentina) Rosario Central	6	2	1	3	8	7	+1	7	Transfer to Copa Sudamericana
4	(Venezuela) Caracas	6	0	1	5	3	19	−16	1	

Source: CONMEBOL
Rules for classification: 1) Points; 2) Goal difference; 3) Goals scored; 4) Away goals scored; 5) CONMEBOL ranking.

4 April 1	Caracas (Venezuela)	1–4	(Brazil) Atlético Mineiro	Caracas, Venezuela
19:00 UTC−3	Pérez 54'	Report	Bruno Fuchs 12'; Arana 32'; Paulinho 44', 70'	Stadium: Estadio Olímpico de la UCV; Attendance: 7,344; Referee: Jhon Ospina (Colombia)

10 April 2	Atlético Mineiro (Brazil)	2–1	(Argentina) Rosario Central	Belo Horizonte, Brazil
19:00 UTC−3	Gustavo Scarpa 39'; Paulinho 77'	Report	Malcorra 74'	Stadium: Arena MRV; Attendance: 34,917; Referee: Kevin Ortega (Peru)

23 April 3	Atlético Mineiro (Brazil)	3–2	(Uruguay) Peñarol	Belo Horizonte, Brazil
21:00 UTC−3	Gustavo Scarpa 15', 57'; Paulinho 26'	Report	Olivera 60'; Silvera 68'	Stadium: Arena MRV; Attendance: 34,279; Referee: Andrés Rojas (Colombia)

7 May 4	Rosario Central (Argentina)	0–1	(Brazil) Atlético Mineiro	Rosario, Argentina
19:00 UTC−3		Report	Paulinho 87'	Stadium: Estadio Gigante de Arroyito; Attendance: 0 Referee: Piero Maza (Chile)

14 May 5	Peñarol (Uruguay)	2–0	(Brazil) Atlético Mineiro	Montevideo, Uruguay
19:00 UTC−3	Lucas Hernández 70'; Silvera 76'	Report		Stadium: Estadio Campeón del Siglo; Attendance: 29,086; Referee: Wilmar Roldán (Colombia)

28 May 6	Atlético Mineiro (Brazil)	4–0	(Venezuela) Caracas	Belo Horizonte, Brazil
19:00 UTC−3	Pedrinho 28', 61'; Alisson Santana 40'; Hulk 90+3'	Report		Stadium: Arena MRV; Attendance: 28,455; Referee: Guillermo Guerrero (Ecuador)

==== Round of 16 ====
13 August First leg	San Lorenzo (Argentina)	1–1	(Brazil) Atlético Mineiro	Buenos Aires, Argentina
21:30 UTC−3	Cuello 17'	Report	Paulinho 58'	Stadium: Estadio Pedro Bidegain; Attendance: 18,108; Referee: Gustavo Tejera (Uruguay)

20 August Second leg	Atlético Mineiro (Brazil)	1–0 (2–1 agg.)	(Argentina) San Lorenzo	Belo Horizonte, Brazil
21:30 UTC−3	Battaglia 65'	Report		Stadium: Arena MRV; Attendance: 40,919; Referee: Felipe González (Chile)

==== Quarter-finals ====
18 September First leg	Fluminense (Brazil)	1–0	(Brazil) Atlético Mineiro	Rio de Janeiro, Brazil
19:00 UTC−3	Lima 87'	Report		Stadium: Maracanã; Attendance: 54,140; Referee: Facundo Tello (Argentina)

25 September Second leg	Atlético Mineiro (Brazil)	2–0 (2–1 agg.)	(Brazil) Fluminense	Belo Horizonte, Brazil
19:00 UTC−3	Deyverson 50', 88'	Report		Stadium: Arena MRV; Attendance: 43,659; Referee: Wilmar Roldán (Colombia)

==== Semi-finals ====
22 October First leg	Atlético Mineiro (Brazil)	3–0	(Argentina) River Plate	Belo Horizonte, Brazil
21:30 UTC−3	Deyverson 22', 70'; Paulinho 74'	Report		Stadium: Arena MRV; Attendance: 44,870; Referee: Jesús Valenzuela (Venezuela)

29 October Second leg	River Plate (Argentina)	0–0 (0–3 agg.)	(Brazil) Atlético Mineiro	Buenos Aires, Argentina
21:30 UTC−3		Report		Stadium: Más Monumental; Attendance: 64,454; Referee: Wilmar Roldán (Colombia)

==== Final ====
30 November Final	Atlético Mineiro (Brazil)	1–3	(Brazil) Botafogo	Buenos Aires, Argentina
17:00 UTC−3	Vargas 47'	Report	Luiz Henrique 35'; Alex Telles 44' (pen.); Júnior Santos 90+7'	Stadium: Más Monumental; Attendance: 69,803; Referee: Facundo Tello (Argentina)

=== Campeonato Brasileiro ===
==== Standings ====
Pos	Team	Pld	W	D	L	GF	GA	GD	Pts	Qualification or relegation
10	Vasco da Gama	38	14	8	16	43	56	−13	50	Qualification for Copa Sudamericana group stage
11	Vitória	38	13	8	17	45	52	−7	47	Qualification for Copa Sudamericana group stage
12	Atlético Mineiro	38	11	14	13	47	54	−7	47	Qualification for Copa Sudamericana group stage
13	Fluminense	38	12	10	16	33	39	−6	46	Qualification for Copa Sudamericana group stage
14	Grêmio	38	12	9	17	44	50	−6	45	Qualification for Copa Sudamericana group stage

Source: CBF
Rules for classification: 1) points; 2) wins; 3) goal difference; 4) goals scored; 5) head-to-head results (only between two teams); 6) fewest red cards; 7) fewest yellow cards; 8) drawing of lots.

==== Result by round ====
Round	1	2	3	4	5	6	7	8	9	10	11	12	13	14	15	16	17	18	19	20	21	22	23	24	25	26	27	28	29	30	31	32	33	34	35	36	37	38
Result	D	D	W	W	D	W	D	W	L	L	D	W	D	L	L	W	D	W	L	W	L	D	D	L	W	L	W	L	D	D	L	L	D	D	D	L	L	W
Position	13	14	7	2	4	3	7	5	6	8	9	7	9	10	11	10	10	8	10	9	9	9	8	10	10	10	9	10	10	9	10	10	10	11	10	13	14	12

Source: CBF
P = Postponed

==== Matches ====
14 April 1	Corinthians	0–0	Atlético Mineiro	São Paulo
16:00 UTC−3		Report		Stadium: Neo Química Arena; Attendance: 44,597; Referee: Yuri Elino Ferreira da Cruz

17 April 2	Atlético Mineiro	1–1	Criciúma	Belo Horizonte
20:00 UTC−3	Gustavo Scarpa 40'	Report	Matheusinho 84'	Stadium: Arena MRV; Attendance: 24,613; Referee: Paulo Belence Alves dos Prazeres Filho

20 April 3	Atlético Mineiro	3–0	Cruzeiro	Belo Horizonte
21:00 UTC−3	Zaracho 25'; Paulinho 35'; Arana 45+2'	Report		Stadium: Arena MRV; Attendance: 39,541; Referee: Ramon Abatti Abel

27 April 4	Cuiabá	0–3	Atlético Mineiro	Cuiabá
18:30 UTC−3		Report	Vargas 28'; Gustavo Scarpa 61'; Paulinho 78' (pen.)	Stadium: Arena Pantanal; Attendance: 6,711; Referee: Sávio Pereira Sampaio

4 May 5	Fluminense	2–2	Atlético Mineiro	Cariacica
16:00 UTC−3	Cano 4'; Renato Augusto 61'	Report	Vargas 73', 79'	Stadium: Estádio Kléber Andrade; Attendance: 14,202; Referee: Raphael Claus

2 June 7	Atlético Mineiro	1–1	Bahia	Belo Horizonte
16:00 UTC−3	Hulk 62'	Report	Ademir 70'	Stadium: Arena MRV; Attendance: 37,994; Referee: Bruno Arleu de Araújo

11 June 8	Red Bull Bragantino	1–2	Atlético Mineiro	Bragança Paulista
21:30 UTC−3	Lucas Evangelista 25'	Report	Zaracho 42'; Paulinho 44'	Stadium: Estádio Nabi Abi Chedid; Attendance: 4,617; Referee: Rafael Rodrigo Klein

17 June 9	Atlético Mineiro	0–4	Palmeiras	Belo Horizonte
20:30 UTC−3		Report	Aníbal Moreno 25'; Piquerez 60' (pen.); Estêvão 61'; José López 90+5'	Stadium: Arena MRV; Attendance: 31,448; Referee: Rodrigo José Pereira de Lima

20 June 10	Vitória	4–2	Atlético Mineiro	Salvador
18:30 UTC−3	Matheuzinho 8'; Willian Oliveira 44', 66'; Erick Castillo 76'	Report	Gustavo Scarpa 14' (pen.); Palacios 88'	Stadium: Barradão; Attendance: 15,159; Referee: Marcelo de Lima Henrique

23 June 11	Atlético Mineiro	1–1	Fortaleza	Belo Horizonte
18:30 UTC−3	Paulinho 58'	Report	Breno Lopes 25'	Stadium: Arena MRV; Attendance: 20,089; Referee: Flávio Rodrigues de Souza

26 June 12	Internacional	1–2	Atlético Mineiro	Criciúma
21:30 UTC−3	Alan Patrick 67'	Report	Cadu 53'; Rômulo 90+7'	Stadium: Estádio Heriberto Hülse; Attendance: 7,791; Referee: Luiz Flávio de Oliveira

30 June 13	Atlético Mineiro	1–1	Atlético Goianiense	Belo Horizonte
11:00 UTC−3	Paulinho 23'	Report	Luiz Fernando 11'	Stadium: Arena MRV; Attendance: 39,767; Referee: Jonathan Benkenstein Pinheiro

3 July 14	Atlético Mineiro	2–4	Flamengo	Belo Horizonte
21:30 UTC−3	Hulk 57' (pen.), 90'	Report	Bruno Henrique 14', 68'; Carlinhos 24'; Ayrton Lucas 51'	Stadium: Arena MRV; Attendance: 39,993; Referee: Ramon Abatti Abel

7 July 15	Botafogo	3–0	Atlético Mineiro	Rio de Janeiro
20:30 UTC−3	Luiz Henrique 13'; Cuiabano 79'; Savarino 90+4'	Report		Stadium: Estádio Nilton Santos; Attendance: 21,582; Referee: Rafael Rodrigo Klein

11 July 16	Atlético Mineiro	2–1	São Paulo	Belo Horizonte
21:30 UTC−3	Vargas 13'; Paulinho 45+3'	Report	Lucas Moura 18'	Stadium: Arena MRV; Attendance: 28,772; Referee: Marcelo de Lima Henrique

16 July 17	Juventude	1–1	Atlético Mineiro	Brasília
19:00 UTC−3	Jean Carlos 43'	Report	Júnior Alonso 18'	Stadium: Estádio Nacional Mané Garrincha; Attendance: 9,788; Referee: Alex Gomes Stefano

21 July 18	Atlético Mineiro	2–0	Vasco	Belo Horizonte
16:00 UTC−3	Hulk 27', 39'	Report		Stadium: Arena MRV; Attendance: 42,353; Referee: Raphael Claus

28 July 20	Atlético Mineiro	2–1	Corinthians	Belo Horizonte
19:00 UTC−3	Hulk 32' (pen.), 85' (pen.)	Report	Yuri Alberto 39'	Stadium: Mineirão; Attendance: 44,048; Referee: Bruno Arleu de Araújo

3 August 21	Criciúma	2–1	Atlético Mineiro	Criciúma
20:00 UTC−3	Higor Meritão 58'; Wilker Ángel 65'	Report	Cadu 90+5'	Stadium: Estádio Heriberto Hülse; Attendance: 15,642; Referee: Jonathan Benkenstein Pinheiro

10 August 22	Cruzeiro	0–0	Atlético Mineiro	Belo Horizonte
21:30 UTC−3		Report		Stadium: Mineirão; Attendance: 61,583; Referee: Raphael Claus

17 August 23	Atlético Mineiro	1–1	Cuiabá	Belo Horizonte
16:00 UTC−3	Igor Gomes 11' (pen.)	Report	Isidro Pitta 44' (pen.)	Stadium: Arena MRV; Attendance: 36,290; Referee: Davi de Oliveira Lacerda

24 August 24	Atlético Mineiro	0–2	Fluminense	Belo Horizonte
21:00 UTC−3		Report	Serna 23'; Arias 59'	Stadium: Mineirão; Attendance: 32,068; Referee: Flávio Rodrigues de Souza

1 September 25	Grêmio	2–3	Atlético Mineiro	Porto Alegre
11:00 UTC−3	Braithwaite 32'; Cristaldo 41'	Report	Gustavo Scarpa 73' (pen.); Palacios 90+5' (pen.); Vargas 90+6'	Stadium: Arena do Grêmio; Attendance: 39,337; Referee: Raphael Claus

15 September 26	Bahia	3–0	Atlético Mineiro	Salvador
18:30 UTC−3	Everaldo 51'; Éverton Ribeiro 58'; Luciano Rodríguez 90+2'	Report		Stadium: Arena Fonte Nova; Attendance: 26,648; Referee: Rafael Rodrigo Klein

22 September 27	Atlético Mineiro	3–0	Red Bull Bragantino	Belo Horizonte
16:00 UTC−3	Deyverson 39'; Cadu 52'; Hulk 78'	Report		Stadium: Arena MRV; Attendance: 24,618; Referee: Lucas Paulo Torezin

28 September 28	Palmeiras	2–1	Atlético Mineiro	Campinas
18:30 UTC−3	Raphael Veiga 45+2' (pen.), 86' (pen.)	Report	Hulk 68'	Stadium: Estádio Brinco de Ouro; Attendance: 16,040; Referee: Bruno Arleu de Araújo

5 October 29	Atlético Mineiro	2–2	Vitória	Belo Horizonte
16:30 UTC−3	Fausto Vera 8'; Vargas 45'	Report	Wagner Leonardo 64'; Alerrandro 68'	Stadium: Arena MRV; Attendance: 34,910; Referee: Matheus Delgado Candançan

9 October 6	Atlético Mineiro	2–1	Grêmio	Belo Horizonte
19:30 UTC−3	Hulk 11' (pen.); Deyverson 39'	Report	Aravena 24'	Stadium: Arena MRV; Attendance: 22,053; Referee: Luiz Flávio de Oliveira

16 October 30	Fortaleza	1–1	Atlético Mineiro	Fortaleza
21:45 UTC−3	Marinho 15'	Report	Fausto Vera 48'	Stadium: Arena Castelão; Attendance: 23,046; Referee: Rafael Rodrigo Klein

26 October 31	Atlético Mineiro	1–3	Internacional	Belo Horizonte
19:00 UTC−3	Vargas 45+3' (pen.)	Report	Alan Patrick 38' (pen.); Bernabei 40'; Bruno Tabata 88'	Stadium: Arena MRV; Attendance: 27,028; Referee: Marcelo de Lima Henrique

6 November 32	Atlético Goianiense	1–0	Atlético Mineiro	Goiânia
21:00 UTC−3	Janderson 89'	Report		Stadium: Estádio Antônio Accioly; Attendance: 3,791; Referee: Jonathan Benkenstein Pinheiro

13 November 33	Flamengo	0–0	Atlético Mineiro	Rio de Janeiro
20:00 UTC−3		Report		Stadium: Maracanã; Attendance: 63,441; Referee: Davi de Oliveira Lacerda

16 November 19	Athletico Paranaense	1–0	Atlético Mineiro	Curitiba
18:30 UTC−3	Cuello 28'	Report		Stadium: Ligga Arena; Attendance: 40,935; Referee: Matheus Delgado Candançan

20 November 34	Atlético Mineiro	0–0	Botafogo	Belo Horizonte
21:30 UTC−3		Report		Stadium: Independência; Attendance: 0 Referee: Luiz Flávio de Oliveira

23 November 35	São Paulo	2–2	Atlético Mineiro	São Paulo
21:30 UTC−3	Fausto Vera 24' (o.g.); André Silva 45+1'	Report	Paulinho 1', 18'	Stadium: Morumbi; Attendance: 36,783; Referee: Alex Gomes Stefano

26 November 36	Atlético Mineiro	2–3	Juventude	Belo Horizonte
21:30 UTC−3	Alisson Santana 73'; Vargas 81' (pen.)	Report	Lucas Barbosa 22'; Gilberto 67'; Erick Farias 90+3'	Stadium: Independência; Attendance: 0 Referee: Flávio Rodrigues de Souza

4 December 37	Vasco	2–0	Atlético Mineiro	Rio de Janeiro
19:00 UTC−3	Vegetti 52'; Coutinho 64'	Report		Stadium: Estádio São Januário; Attendance: 17,074; Referee: Davi de Oliveira Lacerda

8 December 38	Atlético Mineiro	1–0	Athletico Paranaense	Belo Horizonte
16:00 UTC−3	Rubens 73'	Report		Stadium: Arena MRV; Attendance: 0 Referee: Rafael Rodrigo Klein

=== Copa do Brasil ===
==== Third round ====
30 April First leg	Atlético Mineiro	2–0	Sport	Belo Horizonte
21:30 UTC−3	Zaracho 29'; Arana 58'	Report		Stadium: Arena MRV; Attendance: 39,595; Referee: Bruno Mota Correia

22 May Second leg	Sport	1–0 (1–2 agg.)	Atlético Mineiro	São Lourenço da Mata
19:00 UTC−3	Chrystian Barletta 14'	Report		Stadium: Arena Pernambuco; Attendance: 20,035; Referee: Bráulio da Silva Machado

==== Round of 16 ====
31 July First leg	CRB	2–2	Atlético Mineiro	Maceió
19:00 UTC−3	Willian Formiga 6'; Léo Pereira 7'	Report	Paulinho 41' (pen.); Gustavo Scarpa 54'	Stadium: Estádio Rei Pelé; Attendance: 15,894; Referee: Raphael Claus

7 August Second leg	Atlético Mineiro	3–0 (5–2 agg.)	CRB	Belo Horizonte
19:00 UTC−3	Arana 17'; Saravia 25', 63'	Report		Stadium: Arena MRV; Attendance: 34,711; Referee: Flávio Rodrigues de Souza

==== Quarter-finals ====
28 August First leg	São Paulo	0–1	Atlético Mineiro	São Paulo
21:30 UTC−3		Report	Battaglia 90+2'	Stadium: Morumbi; Attendance: 51,432; Referee: Rafael Rodrigo Klein

12 September Second leg	Atlético Mineiro	0–0 (1–0 agg.)	São Paulo	Belo Horizonte
21:45 UTC−3		Report		Stadium: Arena MRV; Attendance: 41,552; Referee: Ramon Abatti Abel

==== Semi-finals ====
2 October First leg	Atlético Mineiro	2–1	Vasco	Belo Horizonte
19:15 UTC−3	Arana 38'; Paulinho 44'	Report	Coutinho 14'	Stadium: Arena MRV; Attendance: 42,039; Referee: Flávio Rodrigues de Souza

19 October Second leg	Vasco	1–1 (2–3 agg.)	Atlético Mineiro	Rio de Janeiro
18:30 UTC−3	Vegetti 38' (pen.)	Report	Hulk 83'	Stadium: Estádio São Januário; Attendance: 18,910; Referee: Ramon Abatti Abel

==== Finals ====
3 November First leg	Flamengo	3–1	Atlético Mineiro	Rio de Janeiro
16:00 UTC−3	De Arrascaeta 11'; Gabriel 39', 74'	Report	Alan Kardec 80'	Stadium: Maracanã; Attendance: 67,459; Referee: Rafael Rodrigo Klein

10 November Second leg	Atlético Mineiro	0–1 (1–4 agg.)	Flamengo	Belo Horizonte
16:00 UTC−3		Report	Plata 82'	Stadium: Arena MRV; Attendance: 44,876; Referee: Raphael Claus

== Statistics ==
=== Squad appearances and goals ===
No.	Pos	Nat	Player	Total		Brasileiro		Mineiro		Copa do Brasil		Libertadores	
No.	Pos	Nat	Player	Apps	Goals	Apps	Goals	Apps	Goals	Apps	Goals	Apps	Goals
Goalkeepers
1	GK	(Brazil) BRA	Gabriel Delfim	1	0	1	0	0	0	0	0	0	0
22	GK	(Brazil) BRA	Everson	59	0	25	0	12	0	9	0	13	0
31	GK	(Brazil) BRA	Matheus Mendes	14	0	12+1	0	0	0	1	0	0	0
32	GK	(Brazil) BRA	Gabriel Átila	0	0	0	0	0	0	0	0	0	0
Defenders
2	DF	(Brazil) BRA	Lyanco	24	0	10+3	0	0	0	5+1	0	4+1	0
3	DF	(Brazil) BRA	Bruno Fuchs	45	2	23+3	0	7+1	1	3+2	0	6	1
4	DF	(Uruguay) URU	Mauricio Lemos	16	2	5+3	0	4+1	2	1+1	0	1	0
8	DF	(Paraguay) PAR	Júnior Alonso	27	1	12	1	0	0	8	0	7	0
13	DF	(Brazil) BRA	Guilherme Arana	51	5	13+4	1	11	0	10	3	13	1
16	DF	(Brazil) BRA	Igor Rabello	26	0	10+6	0	3+3	0	0+1	0	0+3	0
25	DF	(Brazil) BRA	Mariano	22	0	7+4	0	5+1	0	0+2	0	1+2	0
26	DF	(Argentina) ARG	Renzo Saravia	58	3	26+5	0	6+4	1	5+4	2	6+2	0
44	DF	(Brazil) BRA	Rubens	36	3	15+4	1	1+7	2	3+4	0	0+2	0
47	DF	(Brazil) BRA	Rômulo	10	1	5+3	1	0	0	0+1	0	0+1	0
50	DF	(Brazil) BRA	Vitor Gabriel	1	0	0	0	0+1	0	0	0	0	0
Midfielders
5	MF	(Brazil) BRA	Otávio	50	0	22+3	0	6+1	0	9	0	5+4	0
6	MF	(Brazil) BRA	Gustavo Scarpa	65	9	25+7	4	8+3	1	10	1	11+1	3
15	MF	(Argentina) ARG	Matías Zaracho	33	4	11+5	2	4	1	3+3	1	6+1	0
17	MF	(Brazil) BRA	Igor Gomes	46	1	17+5	1	10+2	0	1+4	0	1+6	0
18	MF	(Argentina) ARG	Fausto Vera	27	2	19+1	2	0	0	0	0	6+1	0
20	MF	(Brazil) BRA	Bernard	26	0	12+4	0	0	0	4+1	0	3+2	0
21	MF	(Argentina) ARG	Rodrigo Battaglia	56	4	26	0	8+1	2	8	1	13	1
23	MF	(Ecuador) ECU	Alan Franco	51	0	18+4	0	3+4	0	10	0	11+1	0
27	MF	(Brazil) BRA	Paulo Vitor	14	0	6+7	0	0+1	0	0	0	0	0
33	MF	(Brazil) BRA	Robert	3	0	0+3	0	0	0	0	0	0	0
40	MF	(Brazil) BRA	Vitinho	1	0	0+1	0	0	0	0	0	0	0
Forwards
7	FW	(Brazil) BRA	Hulk	53	19	22+2	10	10	7	8	1	11	1
9	FW	(Brazil) BRA	Deyverson	23	6	12+5	2	0	0	0	0	5+1	4
10	FW	(Brazil) BRA	Paulinho	59	19	22+4	8	11	2	10	2	12	7
11	FW	(Chile) CHI	Eduardo Vargas	38	9	8+15	8	0+4	0	1+4	0	0+6	1
14	FW	(Brazil) BRA	Alan Kardec	25	1	3+15	0	1+2	0	0+2	1	0+2	0
30	FW	(Colombia) COL	Brahian Palacios	26	2	8+11	2	0	0	0+5	0	0+2	0
39	FW	(Brazil) BRA	Caio Maia	2	0	0+2	0	0	0	0	0	0	0
42	FW	(Brazil) BRA	Cadu	32	4	12+8	3	1+1	1	1+4	0	1+4	0
45	FW	(Brazil) BRA	Alisson	36	3	7+12	1	3+4	1	0+4	0	2+4	1
Players who have made an appearance this season but have left the club
8	MF	(Brazil) BRA	Edenílson	9	1	0	0	6+3	1	0	0	0	0
9	FW	(Argentina) ARG	Cristian Pavón	4	0	0	0	0+4	0	0	0	0	0
34	DF	(Brazil) BRA	Jemerson	18	0	3	0	11	0	0	0	4	0
38	MF	(Brazil) BRA	Pedrinho	16	2	1+7	0	1+3	0	0+1	0	1+2	2
41	FW	(Brazil) BRA	Isaac	2	0	0+1	0	0+1	0	0	0	0	0
49	MF	(Brazil) BRA	Patrick	3	0	0	0	0+3	0	0	0	0	0
