= Rodrigo Battaglia =

Argentine footballer (born 1991)

Personal information
- Full name: Rodrigo Andrés Battaglia
- Date of birth: 12 July 1991 (age 35)
- Place of birth: Morón, Argentina
- Height: 1.87 m (6 ft 2 in)
- Positions: Defensive midfielder; centre-back

Team information
- Current team: Boca Juniors
- Number: 6

Youth career
- Vélez Sársfield
- Almagro

Senior career*
Years	Team	Apps	(Gls)
2010–2013	Huracán	68	(4)
2013	Racing Club	8	(0)
2014–2017	Braga	22	(1)
2014	Braga B	2	(1)
2014−2015	→ Moreirense (loan)	35	(3)
2016	→ Rosario Central (loan)	4	(0)
2016	→ Chaves (loan)	14	(3)
2017−2022	Sporting CP	56	(1)
2020−2021	→ Alavés (loan)	32	(1)
2021–2022	→ Mallorca (loan)	26	(0)
2022−2023	Mallorca	15	(0)
2023−2025	Atlético Mineiro	58	(2)
2025−	Boca Juniors	29	(4)

International career
2011	Argentina U20	13	(0)
2018	Argentina	2	(0)
- * Club domestic league appearances and goals as of 17:39, 30 December 2025 (UTC)

Rodrigo Andrés Battaglia (Spanish pronunciation: [roˈðɾiɣo βaˈtaɣlja]; (Note: In isolation, Battaglia is pronounced [baˈtaɣlja].) Italian: [roˈdriːɡo batˈtaʎʎa]; born 12 July 1991) is an Argentine professional footballer who plays as a defensive midfielder for Argentine Primera División club Boca Juniors.

== Club career ==
Battaglia was born and raised in Argentina and is of Italian descent. He spent time in the youth divisions of Vélez Sársfield and Almagro before joining Huracán. He made his professional debut aged 19 in a 3–0 away defeat to Racing Club in the Primera División on 3 October 2010. His first goal for the club came on 26 March 2011 in a 2–0 win against Gimnasia y Esgrima de La Plata.

In January 2014, Battaglia joined S.C. Braga in Portugal, playing 26 games for the club with loan spells in the middle at fellow Primeira Liga sides Moreirense and Chaves, and at his homeland club Rosario Central.

On 15 May 2018, Battaglia and several of his teammates, including coaches, were injured following an attack by around 50 supporters of Sporting at the club's training ground after the team finished third in the league and missed out on the UEFA Champions League qualification. Despite the attack, he and the rest of the team agreed to play in the Portuguese Cup final scheduled for the following weekend, which they lost to C.D. Aves.

On 27 August 2020, he went to Deportivo Alavés on loan.

On 12 August 2021, Battaglia joined Mallorca on a season-long loan. On 29 July 2022, he joined Mallorca permanently, signing a two-year deal.

On 1 April 2023, Battaglia joined Brazilian Série A side Atlético Mineiro, signing a contract until December 2024. On 30 November 2023, he extended his contract with the club until December 2025. In 2024, he was included in El País' South American Team of the Year, playing as a central defender in coach Gabriel Milito's 3-5-2 formation in Atlético's runners-up campaign at the Copa Libertadores.

On 21 January 2025, Battaglia joined Boca Juniors on a three-year deal.

== International career ==
Battaglia played nine games for the Argentina U-20 team in the 2011 South American Youth Championship held in January and February 2011 in Peru. The team finished third in this tournament, qualifying for the 2011 FIFA U-20 World Cup held in July and August 2011 in Colombia. Battaglia appeared in four out of five tournament matches, before the team was eliminated in the quarter-final by Portugal.

In May 2018 he received his first call-up to senior team, as he was named in Argentina's preliminary 35 man squad for the 2018 World Cup in Russia. However, he was not included the final 23 man squad selected by coach Jorge Sampaoli.

On 11 September 2018, Battaglia made his debut in the senior team in a 0–0 draw friendly match against the Colombia national football team.

== Career statistics ==
=== Club ===
As of 15 December 2024

Appearances and goals by club, season and competition
Club	Season	League			National cup		League cup		Continental		Other		Total	
Club	Season	Division	Apps	Goals	Apps	Goals	Apps	Goals	Apps	Goals	Apps	Goals	Apps	Goals
Huracán	2010–11	Argentine Primera División	29	1	—		—		—		—		29	1
Huracán	2011–12	Primera B Nacional	32	3	0	0	—		—		—		32	3
Huracán	2012–13	Primera B Nacional	7	0	0	0	—		—		—		7	0
Huracán	Total		68	4			—		—		—		68	4
Racing Club	2013–14	Argentine Primera División	8	0	—		—		1 (Note: Appearance(s) in Copa Sudamericana)	0	—		9	0
Braga	2013–14	Primeira Liga	6	0	1	0	0	0	—		—		7	0
Braga	2016–17	Primeira Liga	16	1	—		3	0	—		—		19	1
Braga	Total		22	1	1	0	3	0	—		—		26	1
Braga B	2013–14	Segunda Liga	2	1	—		—		—		—		2	1
Moreirense (loan)	2014–15	Primeira Liga	25	2	2	0	5	1	—		—		32	3
Moreirense (loan)	2015–16	Primeira Liga	10	1	1	0	0	0	—		—		11	1
Moreirense (loan)	Total		35	3	3	0	5	1	—		—		43	4
Rosario Central (loan)	2016	Argentine Primera División	4	0	—		—		1 (Note: Appearance(s) in Copa Libertadores)	0	—		5	0
Chaves (loan)	2016–17	Primeira Liga	14	3	3	1	1	0	—		—		18	4
Sporting CP	2017–18	Primeira Liga	33	1	6	0	4	0	14 (Note: Eight appearances and one goal in UEFA Champions League, six appearances and one goal in UEFA Europa League)	2	—		57	3
Sporting CP	2018–19	Primeira Liga	8	0	0	0	1	0	2 (Note: Appearance(s) in UEFA Europa League)	0	—		11	0
Sporting CP	2019–20	Primeira Liga	15	0	0	0	3	0	2	0	0	0	20	0
Sporting CP	Total		56	1	6	0	8	0	18	2	0	0	88	3
Alavés (loan)	2020–21	La Liga	32	1	3	0	—		—		—		35	1
Mallorca (loan)	2021–22	La Liga	26	0	5	0	—		—		—		31	0
Mallorca	2022–23	La Liga	15	0	3	0	—		—		—		18	0
Atlético Mineiro	2023	Série A	22	0	4	1	—		7	0	1 (Note: Appearance(s) in Campeonato Mineiro)	0	34	1
Atlético Mineiro	2024	Série A	26	0	8	1	—		13	1	9	2	56	4
Atlético Mineiro	Total		48	0	12	2	—		20	1	10	2	90	5
Career total			330	14	36	3	17	1	40	3	10	2	433	23

== Honours ==
Sporting CP

- Taça da Liga: 2017–18, 2018–19

Atlético Mineiro

- Campeonato Mineiro: 2023, 2024

Boca Juniors

- Copa Sudamericana: 2026
- Argentine Primera División: 2026 Liga
