= Vitor Gabriel (footballer, born 2006) =

Brazilian footballer (born 2006)

Personal information
- Full name: Vitor Gabriel Reis Guimarães
- Date of birth: 11 March 2006 (age 20)
- Place of birth: Belo Horizonte, Brazil
- Height: 1.76 m (5 ft 9 in)
- Position: Right-back

Team information
- Current team: Caxias (on loan from Atlético Mineiro)

Youth career
- 2022–2026: Atlético Mineiro

Senior career*
Years	Team	Apps	(Gls)
2023–	Atlético Mineiro	2	(0)
2026–	→ Caxias (loan)	0	(0)

International career
2022	Brazil U16	4	(0)
2023	Brazil U17	8	(0)
- * Club domestic league appearances and goals as of 29 May 2024

Vitor Gabriel Reis Guimarães (born 11 March 2006) is a Brazilian footballer who plays as a right-back for Caxias, on loan from Atlético Mineiro.

== Club career ==
Vitor Gabriel made his professional debut for Atlético Mineiro on 8 February 2023, coming on as a half-time substitute for Mariano in a 3–0 win over Democrata-SL.

== International career ==
Vitor Gabriel has represented Brazil at under-16 level. He represented Brazil at the 2022 Montaigu Tournament, where he was praised for his performances.

He has also been called up to the under-17 side, and was called up for the 2023 South American U-17 Championship.

== Career statistics ==
=== Club ===
As of 29 May 2024.

Appearances and goals by club, season and competition
Club	Season	League			State League		Cup		Continental		Other		Total	
Club	Season	Division	Apps	Goals	Apps	Goals	Apps	Goals	Apps	Goals	Apps	Goals	Apps	Goals
Atlético Mineiro	2023	Série A	0	0	1 (Note: Appearances in Campeonato Mineiro)	0	0	0	0	0	—		1	0
Atlético Mineiro	2024	Série A	0	0	1	0	0	0	0	0	—		1	0
Career total			0	0	2	0	0	0	0	0	0	0	2	0

== Honours ==
Atlético Mineiro

- Campeonato Mineiro: 2023, 2024
