= Rubens (footballer, born 2001) =

Rubens Antônio Dias; Brazilian footballer (born 2001)

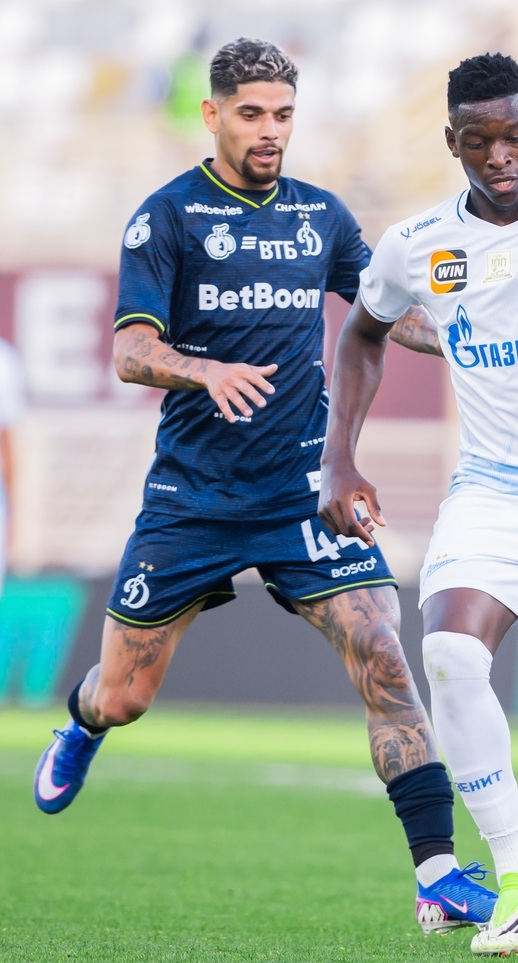
- Rubens with Dynamo Moscow in 2026

Personal information
- Full name: Rubens Antônio Dias
- Date of birth: 21 June 2001 (age 25)
- Place of birth: Tumiritinga, Brazil
- Height: 1.76 m (5 ft 9 in)
- Positions: Midfielder; left-back

Team information
- Current team: Dynamo Moscow
- Number: 8

Youth career
- 2016–2022: Atlético Mineiro

Senior career*
Years	Team	Apps	(Gls)
2020–2025	Atlético Mineiro	115	(7)
2025–	Dynamo Moscow	35	(0)
- * Club domestic league appearances and goals as of 22 November 2026

Rubens Antônio Dias (born 21 June 2001), known as just Rubens, is a Brazilian professional footballer who plays for Russian Premier League club Dynamo Moscow. Primarily a midfielder, he can also play as a left-back.

== Career ==
Born in Tumiritinga, Rubens joined the youth academy of Atlético Mineiro in 2016, winning the Campeonato Brasileiro Sub-20 title in 2020.

On 7 March 2021, Rubens made his professional debut in a Campeonato Mineiro 4–0 home win over Uberlândia. On 25 June 2022, he scored his first goal as a professional in a Campeonato Brasileiro 3–2 home win over Fortaleza.

On 31 July 2025, Rubens joined Russian Premier League club Dynamo Moscow on a five-year contract.

== Career statistics ==
As of 22 November 2026.

Club	Season	League			State League		Cup		Continental		Total	
Club	Season	Division	Apps	Goals	Apps	Goals	Apps	Goals	Apps	Goals	Apps	Goals
Atlético Mineiro	2021	Série A	0	0	1 (Note: Appearance(s) in Campeonato Mineiro)	0	0	0	0	0	1	0
Atlético Mineiro	2022	Série A	29	1	3	0	4	0	7 (Note: Appearance(s) in Copa Libertadores)	0	43	1
Atlético Mineiro	2023	Série A	24	1	9	1	2	0	4	0	39	2
Atlético Mineiro	2024	Série A	19	1	8	2	7	0	2	0	36	3
Atlético Mineiro	2025	Série A	13	1	9	0	4	1	6 (Note: Appearance(s) in Copa Sudamericana)	1	32	3
Atlético Mineiro	Total		85	4	30	3	17	1	19	1	151	9
Dynamo Moscow	2025–26	Russian Premier League	21	0	—		7	0	—		28	0
Dynamo Moscow	2026–27	Russian Premier League	14	0	—		2	0	—		16	0
Dynamo Moscow	Total		35	0	0	0	9	0	0	0	44	0
Career total			120	4	30	3	26	1	19	1	195	9

== Honours ==
Atlético Mineiro

- Campeonato Brasileiro Série A: 2021
- Copa do Brasil: 2021
- Campeonato Mineiro: 2021, 2022, 2023, 2024, 2025
- Supercopa do Brasil: 2022
- Campeonato Brasileiro Sub-20: 2020

Individual

- Campeonato Mineiro Team of the Year: 2024
