= 2025 Atlético Clube Goianiense season =

Atlético Clube Goianiense
2025 season
- Manager: Rafael Guanaes
- Série B: Pre-season
- Campeonato Goiano: Semi-finals
- Copa do Brasil: Pre-season
- Average home league attendance: 4,178

The 2025 season is the 88th competitive campaign for Atlético Clube Goianiense. The team will take part in the Campeonato Brasileiro Série B after relegation, the Campeonato Goiano, and the Copa do Brasil.

== Squad ==
=== Transfers In ===
Pos.	Player	Transferred from	Fee	Date	Source
MF	(Brazil) Raí Ramos	(Brazil) São Paulo	Free	9 January 2025	

=== Transfers Out ===
Pos.	Player	Transferred to	Fee	Date	Source
MF	(Brazil) Luiz Fernando	(Brazil) Athletico Paranaense	Free	1 January 2025	

== Exhibition matches ==
11 January 2025	Atlético Goianiense	1–0	Gama

== Competitions ==
=== Overall record ===
Competition	First match	Last match	Starting round	Final position	Record							
Competition	First match	Last match	Starting round	Final position	Pld	W	D	L	GF	GA	GD	Win %
Série B	5 April 2025	22 November 2025	Matchday 1		1	1	0	0	4	2	+2	100.00
Campeonato Goiano	16 January 2025	15 March 2025	First stage	Semi-finals	15	6	6	3	21	14	+7	40.00
Copa do Brasil	19 February 2025	12 March 2025	First round	Second round	2	0	2	0	2	2	+0	0.00
Total					18	7	8	3	27	18	+9	38.89

Last updated: 7 April 2025
Source: Competitions

=== Série B ===
==== League table ====
Pos	Team	Pld	W	D	L	GF	GA	GD	Pts
9	Avaí	38	14	14	10	50	40	+10	56
10	Cuiabá	38	14	12	12	43	44	−1	54
11	Atlético Goianiense	38	13	13	12	39	38	+1	52
12	Operário Ferroviário	38	12	12	14	40	44	−4	48
13	Vila Nova	38	11	14	13	40	44	−4	47

Source: CBF
Rules for classification: 1) points; 2) wins; 3) goal difference; 4) goals scored; 5) head-to-head results (only between 2 teams); 6) fewest red cards; 7) fewest yellow cards; 8) drawing of lots.

==== Matches ====
7 April 2025 1	Atlético Goianiense	4–2	Athletic Club	Goiânia
19:00 UTC−3	Raí Ramos 43'; Matheus Felipe 69'; Sandro Lima 80'; Robert 90+3'		Amorim 9'; Lincoln 88'	Stadium: Estádio Antônio Accioly

12 April 2025 2	Botafogo-SP	v	Atlético Goianiense

16 April 2025 3	Ferroviária	v	Atlético Goianiense

19 April 2025 4	Atlético Goianiense	v	Cuiabá

29 April 2025 5	Amazonas	v	Atlético Goianiense

3 May 2025 6	Atlético Goianiense	v	Novorizontino

10 May 2025 7	Avaí	v	Atlético Goianiense

17 May 2025 8	Atlético Goianiense	v	Remo

24 May 2025 9	América Mineiro	v	Atlético Goianiense

31 May 2025 10	Atlético Goianiense	v	Goiás

14 June 2025 11	Athletico Paranaense	v	Atlético Goianiense

18 June 2025 12	Atlético Goianiense	v	Coritiba

21 June 2025 13	Atlético Goianiense	v	Volta Redonda

28 June 2025 14	Vila Nova	v	Atlético Goianiense

5 July 2025 15	Atlético Goianiense	v	CRB

12 July 2025 16	Paysandu	v	Atlético Goianiense

19 July 2025 17	Atlético Goianiense	v	Criciúma

23 July 2025 18	Operário Ferroviário	v	Atlético Goianiense

26 July 2025 19	Atlético Goianiense	v	Chapecoense

=== Campeonato Goiano ===
Pos	Team	Pld	W	D	L	GF	GA	GD	Pts	Qualification or relegation
1	Anápolis	11	7	2	2	15	7	+8	23	Advance to Quarter-finals
2	Vila Nova	11	6	4	1	10	5	+5	22	Advance to Quarter-finals
3	Atlético Goianiense	11	5	4	2	14	8	+6	19	Advance to Quarter-finals
4	Goiás	11	5	3	3	11	7	+4	18	Advance to Quarter-finals
5	CRAC	11	4	5	2	10	7	+3	17	Advance to Quarter-finals

Source: FGF

==== Results by round ====
Round	1	2	3
Ground	H	A	A
Result	D	W	
Position			

Updated to match(es) played on 19 January 2025. Source:
A = Away; H = Home; W = Win; D = Draw; L = Loss

16 January 2025 1	Atlético Goianiense	0–0	Jataiense	Goiânia
19:30 UTC−3	Shaylon (penalty missed) 54'			Stadium: Estádio Antônio Accioly

19 January 2025 2	Goiânia	0–2	Atlético Goianiense
16:00 UTC−3

22 January 2025 3	CRAC	v	Atlético Goianiense
19:30 UTC−3

=== Copa do Brasil ===
==== First round ====
19 February 2025	ASA	1–1 (5–6 p)	Atlético Goianiense	Arapiraca
21:30	Chudo 66'	Report	Caio Dantas 42'	Stadium: Estádio Municipal Coaracy da Mata Fonseca; Attendance: 5,141; Referee: Edina Alves Batista (São Paulo)

==== Second round ====
12 March 2025	Atlético Goianiense	1–1 (1–4 p)	Retrô	Goiânia
21:30 (UTC-3)	Caio Dantas 60'	Report	Maycon Douglas 40'	Stadium: Estádio Antônio Accioly; Attendance: 2,492; Referee: Wagner do Nascimento Magalhães
	Penalties
	William Pottker (penalty scored); Guilherme Romão (penalty missed); Ángelo Araos (penalty missed)		(penalty scored) Lucas Grafite; (penalty scored) Ericson; (penalty scored) Radsley; (penalty scored) Iba Ly
