= Robert Santos (footballer) =

Brazilian footballer (born 2003)

Robert
Personal information
- Full name: Robert dos Santos Conceição
- Date of birth: 20 July 2003 (age 23)
- Place of birth: Salvador, Brazil
- Height: 1.80 m (5 ft 11 in)
- Position: Attacking midfielder

Team information
- Current team: Chapecoense (on loan from Atlético Mineiro)
- Number: 8

Youth career
- 2017: Jacuipense
- 2018–2019: Vitória
- 2020–2021: Palmeiras
- 2021–2022: Bahia
- 2022–2023: Portimonense

Senior career*
Years	Team	Apps	(Gls)
2024	Athletic-MG	7	(3)
2024	→ Atlético Mineiro (loan)	3	(0)
2025–	Atlético Mineiro	4	(0)
2025	→ Atlético Goianiense (loan)	37	(5)
2026–	→ Chapecoense (loan)	6	(0)
- * Club domestic league appearances and goals as of 9 April 2026

Robert dos Santos Conceição (born 20 July 2003), known as Robert Santos or just Robert, is a Brazilian footballer who plays as an attacking midfielder for Campeonato Brasileiro Série A club Chapecoense, on loan from Atlético Mineiro.

== Career ==
Born in Salvador, Bahia, Robert began his career with local side Jacuipense in 2017, before moving to the youth sides of Vitória in the following year. In 2020, he joined Palmeiras.

On 15 April 2021, Robert signed a contract with Bahia and was assigned to the under-20 squad. On 24 November, he renewed his link with the club for a further year, but moved abroad with Portuguese side Portimonense in July 2022.

After featuring rarely for the under-23 side of the Marafados, Robert was released in July 2023, and spent a period without a club before being announced at Athletic-MG on 23 January 2024. He made his professional debut the following day, coming on as a second-half substitute and scoring the opener in a 2–1 Campeonato Mineiro home win over Ipatinga.

Robert had individual success in the 2024 Campeonato Mineiro campaign, scoring three goals and providing two assists in seven appearances. His performances drew interest from clubs from the top national division, and on 27 March 2024 it was announced his signing by Atlético Mineiro on a season-long loan. In January 2025, the club triggered his release clause and Robert signed a permanent three-year deal.

On 8 February 2025, Robert joined Atlético Goianiense on a season-long loan.

In January 2026, Robert joined Chapecoense on a season-long loan.

== Career statistics ==
As of 1 January 2026

Club	Season	League			State League		Cup		Continental		Other		Total	
Club	Season	Division	Apps	Goals	Apps	Goals	Apps	Goals	Apps	Goals	Apps	Goals	Apps	Goals
Athletic-MG	2024	Série C	—		7	3	2	1	—		—		9	4
Atlético Mineiro	2024	Série A	3	0	—		—		0	0	—		3	0
Atlético Mineiro	2025	Série A	—		4	0	—		—		—		4	0
Atlético Mineiro	Total		3	0	4	0	—		0	0	—		7	0
Atlético Goianiense	2025	Série B	33	5	4	0	0	0	—		—		37	5
Career total			36	5	15	3	2	1	0	0	0	0	53	9
