= Brahian Palacios =

Colombian footballer

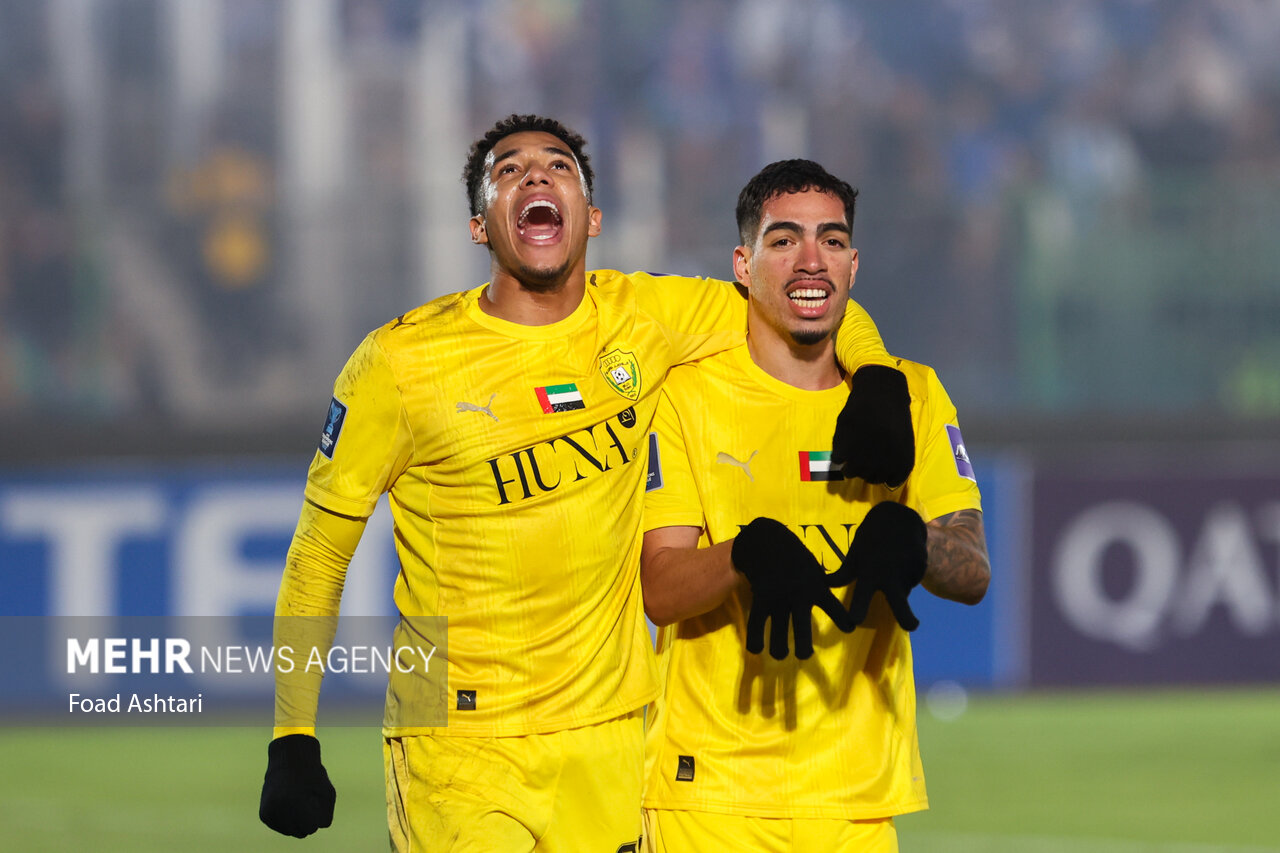
- Brahian Palacios playing for Al Wasl in 2025.

Personal information
- Full name: Brahian Palacios Alzate
- Date of birth: 24 November 2002 (age 23)
- Place of birth: Medellín, Colombia
- Height: 1.82 m (6 ft 0 in)
- Position: Winger

Team information
- Current team: Al Wasl
- Number: 30

Youth career
- Atlético Nacional

Senior career*
Years	Team	Apps	(Gls)
2021–2024	Atlético Nacional	43	(4)
2024–2026	Atlético Mineiro	23	(2)
2025–2026	→ Al Wasl (loan)	10	(1)
2026–	Al Wasl	0	(0)

International career^{‡}
2023–	Colombia U23	8	(0)
- * Club domestic league appearances and goals as of 13 June 2025 ‡ National team caps and goals as of 2 February 2024

Brahian Palacios Alzate (born 24 November 2002) is a Colombian professional footballer who plays as a winger for UAE Pro League club Al Wasl.

== Career statistics ==
As of match played 29 May 2025

Appearances and goals by club, season and competition
Club	Season	League			National cup (Note: Includes Copa Colombia and Copa do Brasil)		Continental		Other		Total	
Club	Season	Division	Apps	Goals	Apps	Goals	Apps	Goals	Apps	Goals	Apps	Goals
Atlético Nacional	2022	Categoría Primera A	5	1	0	0	0	0	—		5	1
Atlético Nacional	2023	Categoría Primera A	36	3	6	0	4 (Note: Appearance(s) in Copa Libertadores)	0	1 (Note: Appearance(s) in Superliga Colombiana)	0	47	3
Atlético Nacional	2024	Categoría Primera A	2	0	0	0	2	0	—		4	0
Atlético Nacional	Total		43	4	6	0	6	0	1	0	56	4
Atlético Mineiro	2024	Campeonato Brasileiro Série A	19	2	5	0	2	0	0	0	26	2
Atlético Mineiro	2025	Campeonato Brasileiro Série A	1	0	1	0	2 (Note: Appearance(s) in Copa Sudamericana)	0	3 (Note: Appearance(s) in Campeonato Mineiro)	0	7	0
Atlético Mineiro	Total		20	2	6	0	4	0	3	0	33	2
Al Wasl (loan)	2025–26	UAE Pro League	0	0	0	0	0	0	0	0	0	0
Career total			63	6	12	0	10	0	4	0	89	6

== Honours ==
Atlético Nacional

- Categoría Primera A: 2022 Apertura
- Copa Colombia: 2023
- Superliga Colombiana: 2023

Atlético Mineiro

- Campeonato Mineiro: 2024, 2025
