= Renzo Saravia =

Argentine footballer

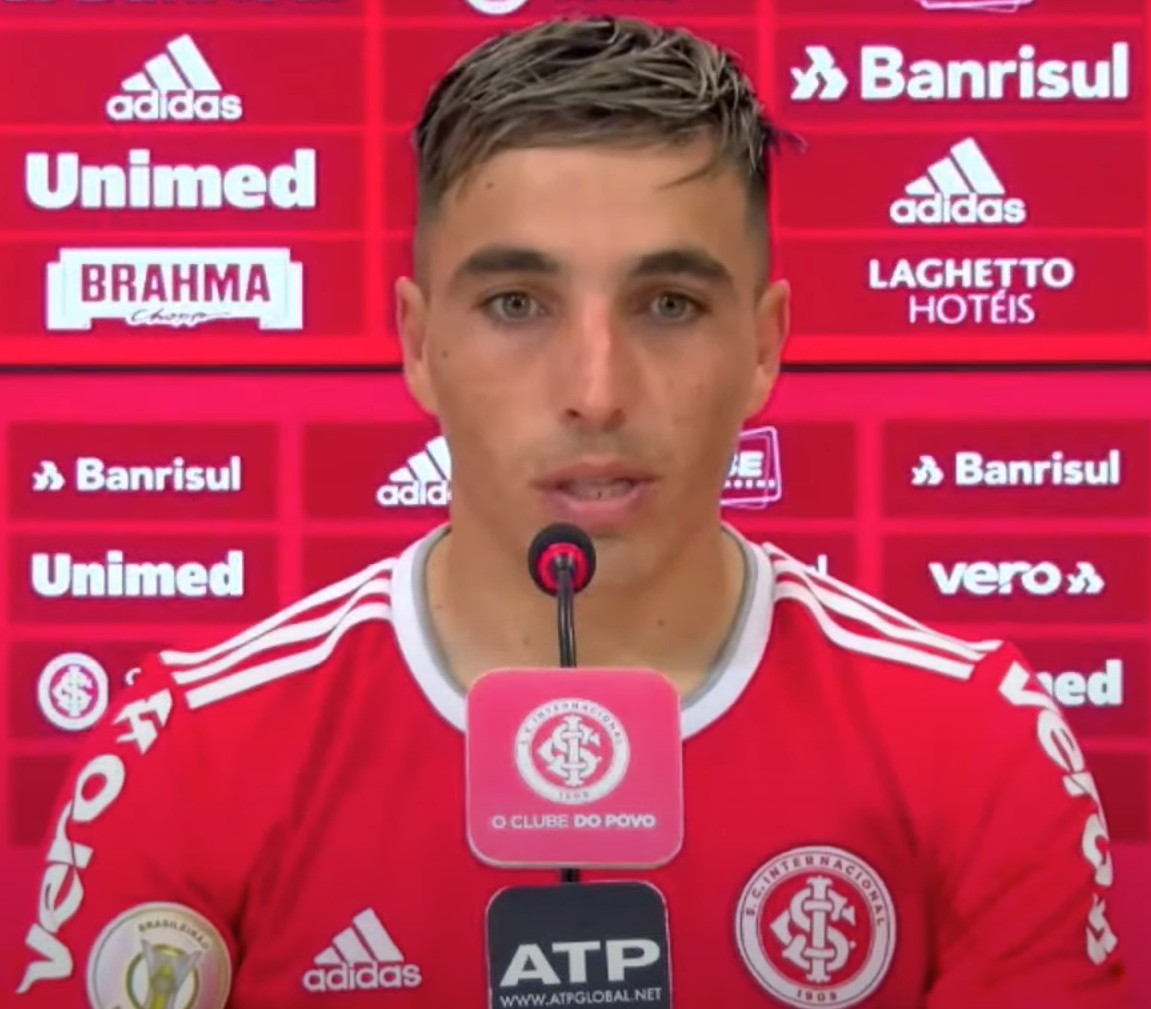
- Saravia with Internacional in 2020

Personal information
- Date of birth: 16 June 1993 (age 33)
- Place of birth: Villa de María del Río Seco, Argentina
- Height: 1.78 m (5 ft 10 in)
- Position: Right back

Youth career
- 2002–2009: Instituto
- 2009–2010: Las Palmas
- 2010–2013: Belgrano

Senior career*
| Years | Team | Apps | (Gls) |
| 2013–2018 | Belgrano | 73 | (0) |
| 2017–2018 | → Racing (loan) | 18 | (0) |
| 2018–2019 | Racing | 21 | (0) |
| 2019–2021 | Porto | 0 | (0) |
| 2020–2021 | → Internacional (loan) | 40 | (0) |
| 2022 | Botafogo | 25 | (0) |
| 2023–2025 | Atlético Mineiro | 90 | (1) |
| 2026 | Valencia | 5 | (0) |

International career^{‡}
| 2018–2019 | Argentina | 9 | (0) |
Medal record
Men's football
Representing Argentina
Copa América
| Third place | 2019 Brazil |
- * Club domestic league appearances and goals as of 27 May 2026 ‡ National team caps and goals as of 17 June 2019

Renzo Saravia (Spanish pronunciation: [ˈren.so saˈɾa.βja]; born 16 June 1993) is an Argentine professional footballer who plays as a right back.

== Club career ==
=== Early career ===
Born in Villa de María del Río Seco in the interior of Córdoba Province, Saravia had not played for any football clubs before he moved to the provincial capital; his father Reynaldo, a retired policeman, staked everything he had on finding him a team. From the age of 9 to 15 he played for Instituto Atlético Central Córdoba, where his teammates included Paulo Dybala.

Saravia then signed for Club Atlético Las Palmas and was loaned to Club Atlético Belgrano for a year with the option to buy for 150,000 Argentine pesos.

=== Belgrano ===
Saravia was promoted to Belgrano's first team in January 2013.

=== Racing Club ===
In July 2017, he signed for Racing Club de Avellaneda, where he won the 2018–19 Argentine Primera División.

=== Porto ===
In June 2019, Saravia signed a four-year deal with FC Porto. He made his debut on 13 August in the second leg of the third qualifying round of the UEFA Champions League at home to FC Krasnodar, and was substituted for striker Zé Luís with the team already 3–0 down after 38 minutes in a 3–2 loss. Still unused in the Primeira Liga, he scored his first goal to open a 3–0 group win at Casa Pia A.C. in the Taça da Liga on 5 December.

==== Internacional (loan) ====
On 28 February 2020, Saravia joined Campeonato Brasileiro Série A club Internacional on loan, where he spent two seasons.

=== Botafogo ===
On 8 April 2022, he signed a permanent deal with Botafogo, staying at the club for the remainder of the season.

=== Atlético Mineiro ===
On 16 February 2023, Saravia joined Atlético Mineiro. He left the club at the expiration of his contract in December 2025. In total, he made 129 appearances for the side, scoring three goals, providing two assists and winning three consecutive Campeonato Mineiro titles.

=== Valencia ===
On 23 February 2026, Saravia joined La Liga club Valencia on a three-month contract.

== International career ==
Saravia made his international debut for Argentina on 8 September 2018 in a 3–0 international friendly against Guatemala. Manager Lionel Scaloni named him in the 23-man squad for the 2019 Copa América in Brazil, where he played two group games for the bronze medallists.

== Career statistics ==
=== Club ===
As of 7 December 2025

Appearances and goals by club, season and competition
| Club | Season | League | | | National cup | | Continental | | Other | | Total | |
| Club | Season | Division | Apps | Goals | Apps | Goals | Apps | Goals | Apps | Goals | Apps | Goals |
|---|---|---|---|---|---|---|---|---|---|---|---|---|
| Belgrano | 2012–13 | Primera División | 8 | 0 | 1 | 0 | — | | — | | 9 | 0 |
| Belgrano | 2013–14 | Primera División | 5 | 0 | — | | 0 | 0 | — | | 5 | 0 |
| Belgrano | 2014 | Primera División | 8 | 0 | — | | — | | — | | 8 | 0 |
| Belgrano | 2015 | Primera División | 28 | 0 | 0 | 0 | 0 | 0 | — | | 28 | 0 |
| Belgrano | 2016 | Primera División | 6 | 0 | 4 | 0 | 0 | 0 | — | | 10 | 0 |
| Belgrano | 2016–17 | Primera División | 18 | 0 | 1 | 0 | — | | — | | 19 | 0 |
| Belgrano | Total | | 73 | 0 | 6 | 0 | 0 | 0 | 0 | 0 | 79 | 0 |
| Racing (loan) | 2017–18 | Primera División | 18 | 0 | 0 | 0 | 6 (Note: Appearance(s) in Copa Libertadores) | 0 | — | | 24 | 0 |
| Racing | 2018–19 | Primera División | 21 | 0 | — | | 1 (Note: Appearance(s) in Copa Sudamericana) | 0 | 3 (Note: Appearance(s) in Copa de la Superliga) | 0 | 25 | 0 |
| Porto | 2019–20 | Primeira Liga | 0 | 0 | 2 | 0 | 1 (Note: Appearance(s) in UEFA Champions League) | 0 | 2 (Note: Appearance(s) in Taça da Liga) | 1 | 5 | 1 |
| Internacional (loan) | 2020 | Série A | 8 | 0 | — | | 3 | 0 | 5 (Note: Appearance(s) in Campeonato Gaúcho) | 0 | 16 | 0 |
| Internacional (loan) | 2021 | Série A | 27 | 0 | 2 | 0 | 4 | 0 | 0 | 0 | 33 | 0 |
| Internacional (loan) | Total | | 35 | 0 | 2 | 0 | 7 | 0 | 5 | 0 | 49 | 0 |
| Botafogo | 2022 | Série A | 25 | 0 | 4 | 0 | — | | — | | 29 | 0 |
| Atlético Mineiro | 2023 | Série A | 26 | 0 | 3 | 0 | 9 | 0 | 2 (Note: Appearance(s) in Campeonato Mineiro) | 0 | 40 | 0 |
| Atlético Mineiro | 2024 | Série A | 31 | 0 | 9 | 2 | 8 | 0 | 10 | 1 | 58 | 3 |
| Atlético Mineiro | 2025 | Série A | 19 | 0 | 2 | 0 | 8 | 0 | 2 | 0 | 31 | 0 |
| Atlético Mineiro | Total | | 76 | 0 | 14 | 2 | 25 | 0 | 14 | 1 | 129 | 3 |
| Valencia | 2025–26 | La Liga | 0 | 0 | — | | — | | — | | 0 | 0 |
| Career total | | | 248 | 0 | 28 | 2 | 40 | 0 | 24 | 2 | 340 | 4 |

=== International ===
As of match played 18 November 2019

Appearances and goals by national team and year
| National team | Year | Apps | Goals |
|---|---|---|---|
| Argentina | 2018 | 3 | 0 |
| Argentina | 2019 | 6 | 0 |
| Total | | 9 | 0 |

== Honours ==
Racing Club

- Argentine Primera División: 2018–19

Porto

- Taça de Portugal: 2019–20

Atlético Mineiro

- Campeonato Mineiro: 2023, 2024, 2025
