= Bruno Fuchs (footballer) =

Brazilian footballer (born 1999)

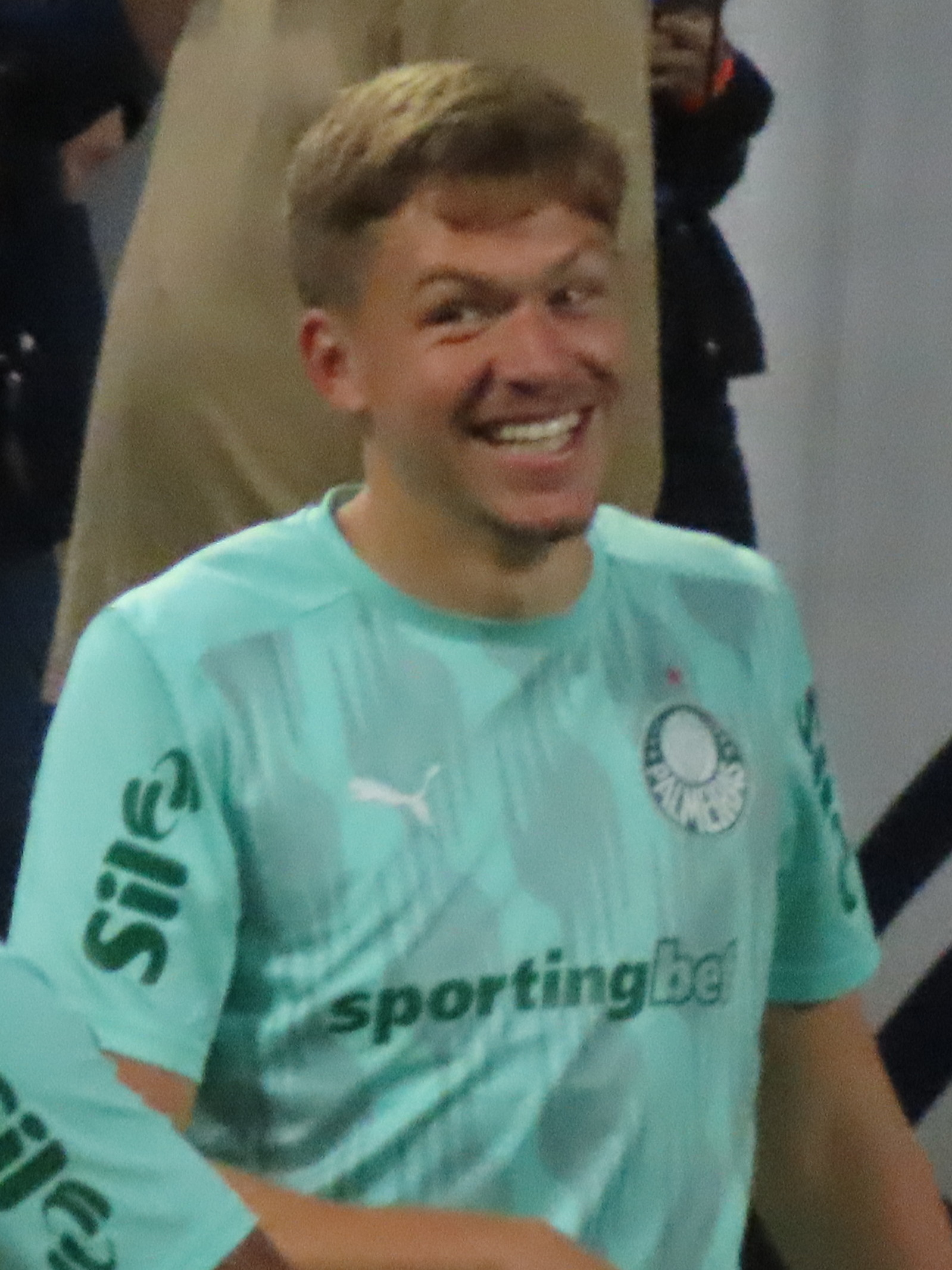
- Fuchs with Palmeiras in 2025

Personal information
- Full name: Bruno de Lara Fuchs
- Date of birth: 1 April 1999 (age 27)
- Place of birth: Ponta Grossa, Paraná, Brazil
- Height: 1.90 m (6 ft 3 in)
- Position: Centre-back

Team information
- Current team: Palmeiras
- Number: 3

Youth career
- Internacional

Senior career*
Years	Team	Apps	(Gls)
2019–2020	Internacional	18	(0)
2020–2024	CSKA Moscow	12	(0)
2023–2024	→ Atlético Mineiro (loan)	52	(1)
2025	Atlético Mineiro	0	(0)
2025	→ Palmeiras (loan)	28	(2)
2026–	Palmeiras	8	(0)

International career^{‡}
2019–2021	Brazil U23	8	(0)
Medal record
Men's football
Representing Brazil
Olympic Games
Gold medal – first place	2020 Tokyo	Team
- * Club domestic league appearances and goals as of 7 April 2026 ‡ National team caps and goals as of 15:03, 7 August 2021 (UTC)

Bruno de Lara Fuchs (born 1 April 1999) is a Brazilian footballer who plays as a centre-back for Palmeiras.

== Club career ==
=== Internacional ===
Fuchs made his professional debut for Internacional on 28 July 2019, in a Série A 1–0 victory over Ceará.

=== CSKA Moscow ===
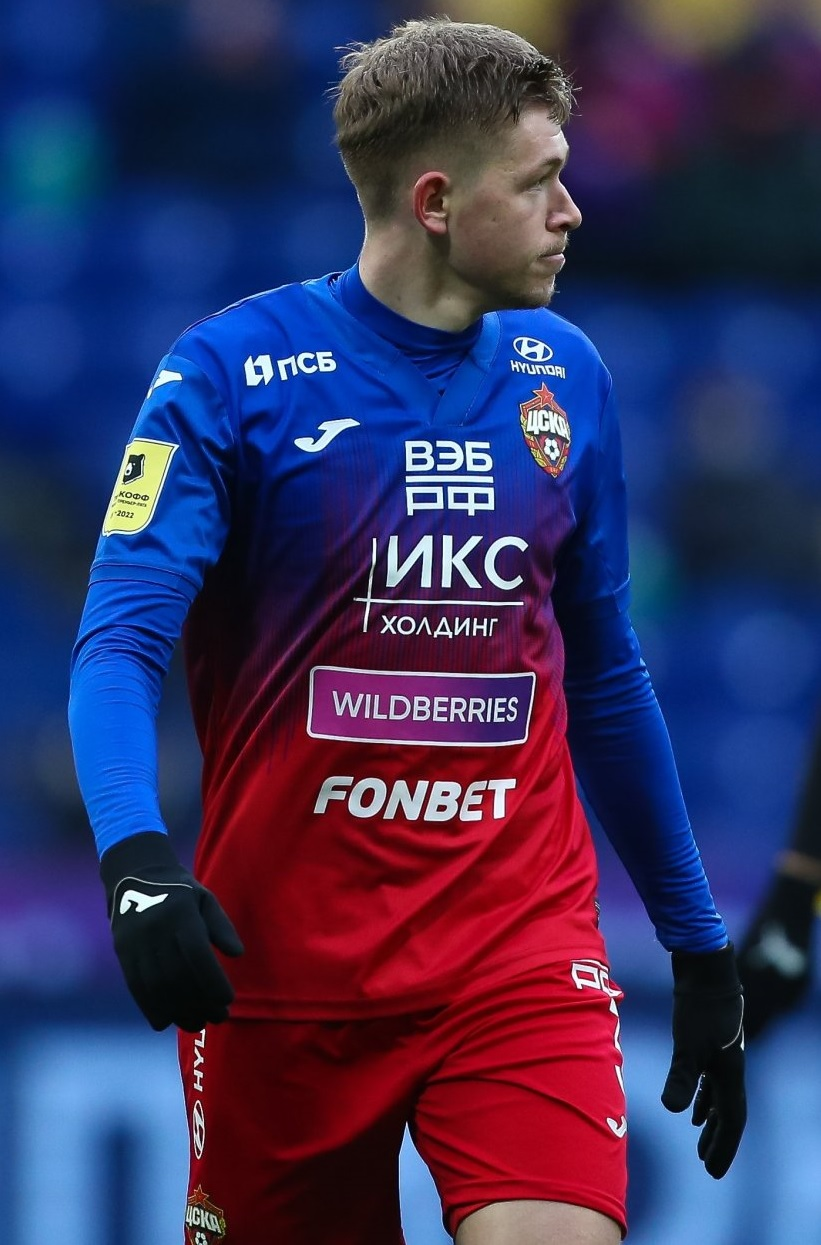
Fuchs with CSKA Moscow in 2021

On 25 August 2020, Fuchs signed a five-year contract with Russian Premier League club CSKA Moscow. On 21 November 2021, Fuchs started the game against FC Khimki, which was his first league appearance for CSKA since August 2020, as he suffered from recurring injuries in the interim. In the 15th minute of the game, he was sent off.

=== Atlético Mineiro ===
On 16 December 2022, Fuchs joined Atlético Mineiro on a year-long loan deal from CSKA Moscow, with an option to make the move permanent.

On 6 December 2023, the loan was extended to December 2024, and a conditional obligation to buy was included. On 19 December 2024, CSKA announced that the conditions had been fulfilled for the obligation to buy to come into effect, and the transfer became permanent.

=== Palmeiras ===
On 14 February 2025, Fuchs joined Palmeiras on a season-long loan with the option to buy. On 18 December, the club opted to trigger the clause and Fuchs signed a four-year contract.

== International career ==
Fuchs represented Brazil at youth level in the 2017 and 2019 editions of the Toulon Tournament, winning the latter. He also played at the 2020 CONMEBOL Pre-Olympic Tournament.

On 2 July 2021, Fuchs was named in the Brazil squad for the 2020 Summer Olympics.

== Career statistics ==
=== Club ===
As of match played 7 December 2025

Appearances and goals by club, season and competition
Club	Season	League			State league		National cup (Note: Includes Copa do Brasil and Russian Cup)		Continental		Other		Total	
Club	Season	Division	Apps	Goals	Apps	Goals	Apps	Goals	Apps	Goals	Apps	Goals	Apps	Goals
Internacional	2019	Série A	10	0	0	0	0	0	0	0	—		10	0
Internacional	2020	Série A	2	0	6 (Note: Appearance(s) in Campeonato Gaúcho)	0	0	0	4 (Note: Appearance(s) in Copa Libertadores)	0	—		12	0
Internacional	Total		12	0	6	0	0	0	4	0	—		22	0
CSKA Moscow	2020–21	Russian Premier League	1	0	—		0	0	0	0	—		1	0
CSKA Moscow	2021–22	Russian Premier League	7	0	—		3	0	—		—		10	0
CSKA Moscow	2022–23	Russian Premier League	4	0	—		4	0	—		—		8	0
CSKA Moscow	2023–24	Russian Premier League	0	0	—		0	0	—		0	0	0	0
CSKA Moscow	2024–25	Russian Premier League	0	0	—		0	0	—		—		0	0
CSKA Moscow	Total		12	0	—		7	0	0	0	0	0	19	0
Atlético Mineiro (loan)	2023	Série A	15	0	3 (Note: Appearance(s) in Campeonato Mineiro)	0	1	0	4	0	—		23	0
Atlético Mineiro (loan)	2024	Série A	26	0	8	1	5	0	6	1	—		45	2
Atlético Mineiro (loan)	Total		41	0	11	1	6	0	10	1	—		68	2
Palmeiras (loan)	2025	Série A	27	2	1 (Note: Appearance(s) in Campeonato Paulista)	0	3	0	10	1	3 (Note: Appearance(s) in FIFA Club World Cup)	0	44	3
Career total			92	2	18	1	16	0	24	2	3	0	153	5

== Honours ==
Atlético Mineiro

- Campeonato Mineiro: 2023, 2024

CSKA Moscow

- Russian Cup: 2022–23

Palmeiras

- Campeonato Paulista: 2026

Brazil U22

- Toulon Tournament: 2019

Brazil Olympic

- Summer Olympics: 2020
