= Rômulo (footballer, born 2004) =

Brazilian footballer

Personal information
- Full name: Rômulo Helberte Pereira Júnior
- Date of birth: 31 January 2004 (age 22)
- Place of birth: Belo Horizonte, Brazil
- Height: 1.83 m (6 ft 0 in)
- Position: Centre-back

Team information
- Current team: Criciúma (on loan from Atlético Mineiro)

Youth career
- 2018–2024: Atlético Mineiro

Senior career*
Years	Team	Apps	(Gls)
2021–	Atlético Mineiro	11	(1)
2025–2026	→ Sporting CP B (loan)	15	(0)
2026	→ Sporting CP (loan)	1	(0)
2026–	→ Criciúma (loan)	1	(0)

International career
2019	Brazil U15	6	(0)
- * Club domestic league appearances and goals as of 20 June 2026

Rômulo Helberte Pereira Júnior (born 31 January 2004), known as just Rômulo, is a Brazilian professional footballer who plays as a centre-back for Criciúma, on loan from Atlético Mineiro.

== Career ==
Born in Belo Horizonte, Rômulo joined the youth academy of Atlético Mineiro in 2018. He received his first call up to the first team in December 2021, sitting on the bench during a 4–3 defeat to Grêmio in the final round of the Série A. He was listed as a first team player at the start of the 2024 season and made his debut in a Série A 2–2 draw to Fluminense on 4 May, coming on as a substitute in the second half.

On 6 August 2025, Rômulo joined Portuguese club Sporting CP on a one-year loan deal with an option to buy, being initially assigned to their reserve team.

== Career statistics ==
As of match played 1 July 2026

Club	Season	League			State league		National cup		League cup		Continental		Other		Total	
Club	Season	Division	Apps	Goals	Apps	Goals	Apps	Goals	Apps	Goals	Apps	Goals	Apps	Goals	Apps	Goals
Atlético Mineiro	2024	Série A	8	1	0	0	1	0	—		1 (Note: Appearances in Copa Libertadores)	0	—		10	1
Atlético Mineiro	2025	Série A	3	0	0	0	1	0	—		2 (Note: Appearances in Copa Sudamericana)	0	—		6	0
Atlético Mineiro	Total		11	1	0	0	2	0	—		3	0	—		16	1
Sporting CP B (loan)	2025–26	Liga Portugal 2	15	0	—		—		—		—		—		15	0
Sporting CP (loan)	2025–26	Primeira Liga	1	0	—		0	0	1	0	0	0	0	0	2	0
Career total			27	1	0	0	2	0	1	0	3	0	0	0	33	1

== Honours ==
Atlético Mineiro

- Campeonato Mineiro: 2024, 2025

Brazil U15

- South American U-15 Championship: 2019
