= Alisson Santana =

Brazilian footballer (born 2005)

Alisson
Personal information
- Full name: Alisson Santana Lopes da Fonseca
- Date of birth: 21 September 2005 (age 21)
- Place of birth: Cachoeirinha, Brazil
- Height: 1.83 m (6 ft 0 in)
- Positions: Winger; attacking midfielder

Team information
- Current team: Shakhtar Donetsk
- Number: 30

Youth career
- 2017–2018: Cruzeiro-RS
- 2019–2020: Nação
- 2021–2023: Atlético Mineiro

Senior career*
Years	Team	Apps	(Gls)
2023–2025	Atlético Mineiro	32	(2)
2025–	Shakhtar Donetsk	30	(5)

International career^{‡}
2025–2026	Brazil U20	8	(1)
2026–	Brazil	2	(0)
Medal record
Men's football
Representing Brazil
South American U-20 Championship
Winner	2025 Venezuela
- * Club domestic league appearances and goals as of 30 October 2026 ‡ National team caps and goals as of 14 November 2026

Alisson Santana Lopes da Fonseca (born 21 September 2005), known as Alisson Santana or just Alisson, is a Brazilian footballer who plays as either a winger or an attacking midfielder for Ukrainian club Shakhtar Donetsk and the Brazil national team.

== Club career ==
=== Early career ===
Born in Cachoeirinha, Rio Grande do Sul, Alisson began his career with Cruzeiro-RS's youth sides, and had failed trials at Grêmio and Internacional before joining Nação at the age of 13. In 2021, aged 15, he joined Atlético Mineiro's youth categories.

=== Atlético Mineiro ===
On 31 August 2022, Alisson signed his first professional contract with Galo, after agreeing to a three-year deal. He made his professional – and Série A – debut on 8 July 2023, coming on as a second-half substitute for Igor Gomes in a 1–0 home loss to Corinthians.

=== Shakhtar Donetsk ===
On 10 March 2025, Alisson joined Ukrainian Premier League club Shakhtar Donetsk on a five-year deal. He made his debut for the club on the following day, appearing as a second-half substitute in a league 0–0 draw to Karpaty Lviv.

== International career ==
On 29 October 2026, Alisson was called up to the Brazil national team by Carlo Ancelotti for two friendlies against Japan and Singapore.

== Career statistics ==
As of match played 3 November 2026

Club	Season	League			State League		Cup		Continental		Other		Total	
Club	Season	Division	Apps	Goals	Apps	Goals	Apps	Goals	Apps	Goals	Apps	Goals	Apps	Goals
Atlético Mineiro	2023	Série A	5	0	0	0	0	0	0	0	—		5	0
Atlético Mineiro	2024	Série A	19	1	7	1	4	0	6 (Note: Appearance(s) in Copa Libertadores)	1	—		36	3
Atlético Mineiro	2025	Série A	—		1 (Note: Soccerway attribute one appearance to Alisson in the match against Pouso Alegre, but the player who featured in that match was Alisson Souza)	0	1	1	—		—		2	1
Atlético Mineiro	Total		24	1	8	1	5	1	6	1	—		43	4
Shakhtar Donetsk	2024–25	Ukrainian Premier League	9	0	—		3	1	—		—		12	1
Shakhtar Donetsk	2025–26	Ukrainian Premier League	12	1	—		1	0	13 (Note: Five appearances and three goals in UEFA Europa League, eight appearances and three goals in UEFA Conference League)	6	—		26	7
Shakhtar Donetsk	2026–27	Ukrainian Premier League	9	4	—		1	1	4 (Note: Appearances in UEFA Champions League)	0	—		14	5
Shakhtar Donetsk	Total		20	5	—		5	2	17	3	—		52	13
Career total			54	6	8	1	10	3	23	4	0	0	95	17

== Honours ==
Atlético Mineiro

- Campeonato Mineiro: 2024

Brazil U20

- South American U-20 Championship: 2025

Shakhtar Donetsk

- Ukrainian Cup: 2024–25
