= Gustavo Scarpa =

Brazilian footballer (born 1994)

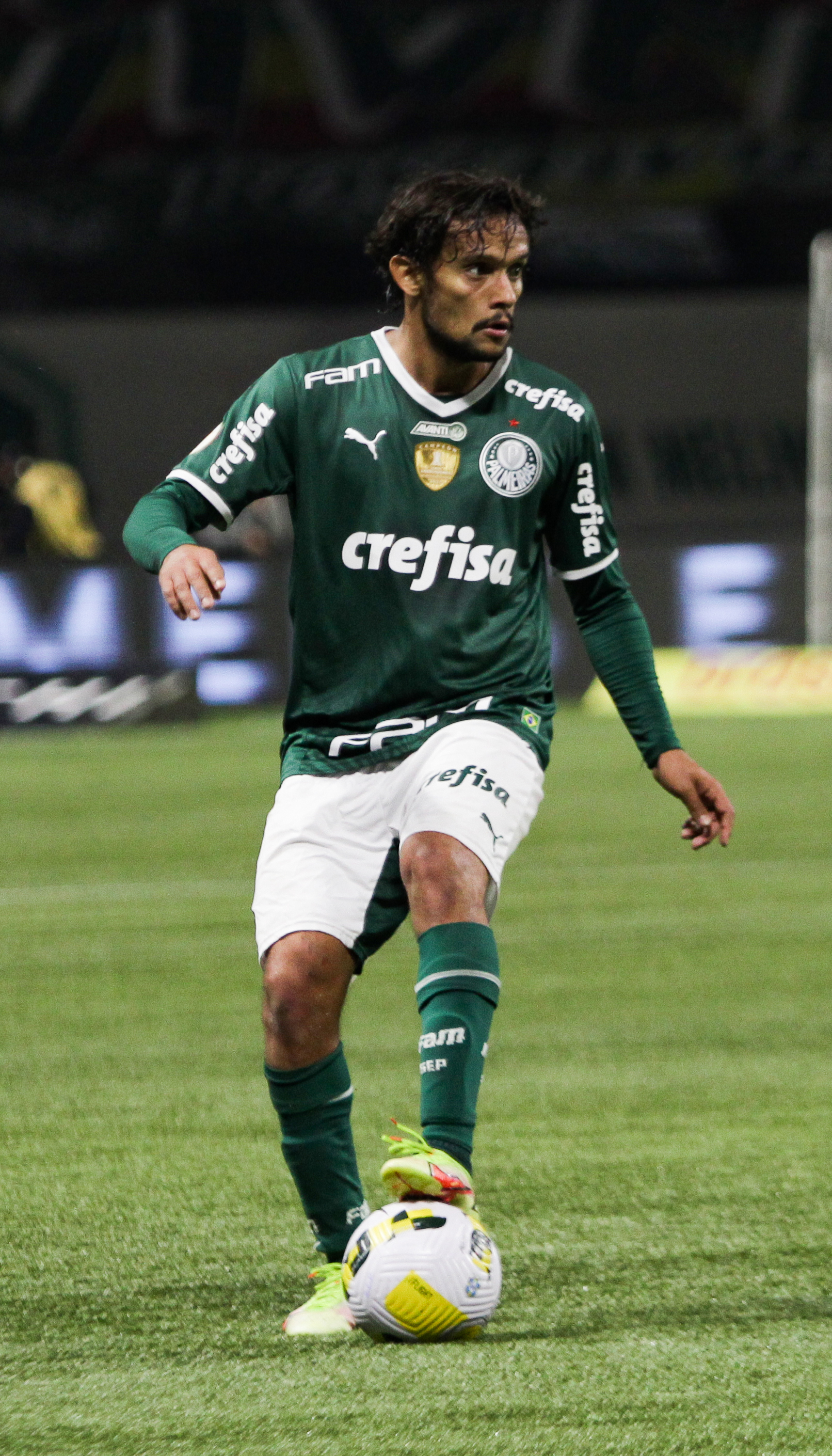
- Scarpa playing for Palmeiras in 2022

Personal information
- Full name: Gustavo Henrique Furtado Scarpa
- Date of birth: 5 January 1994 (age 32)
- Place of birth: Hortolândia, Brazil
- Height: 1.77 m (5 ft 10 in)
- Positions: Attacking midfielder; winger

Team information
- Current team: Atlético Mineiro
- Number: 10

Youth career
- Guarani
- Santos
- Paulínia
- –2012: Desportivo Brasil
- 2013: Fluminense

Senior career*
Years	Team	Apps	(Gls)
2014–2017	Fluminense	126	(21)
2015	→ Red Bull Brasil (loan)	11	(2)
2018–2023	Palmeiras	181	(27)
2023–2024	Nottingham Forest	6	(0)
2023–2024	→ Olympiacos (loan)	7	(0)
2024–	Atlético Mineiro	105	(9)

International career^{‡}
2017	Brazil	1	(0)
- * Club domestic league appearances and goals as of 7 April 2026 ‡ National team caps and goals as of 25 January 2017

Gustavo Henrique Furtado Scarpa (born 5 January 1994) is a Brazilian professional footballer who plays as an attacking midfielder or winger for Campeonato Brasileiro Série A club Atlético Mineiro.

== Club career ==
=== Fluminense ===
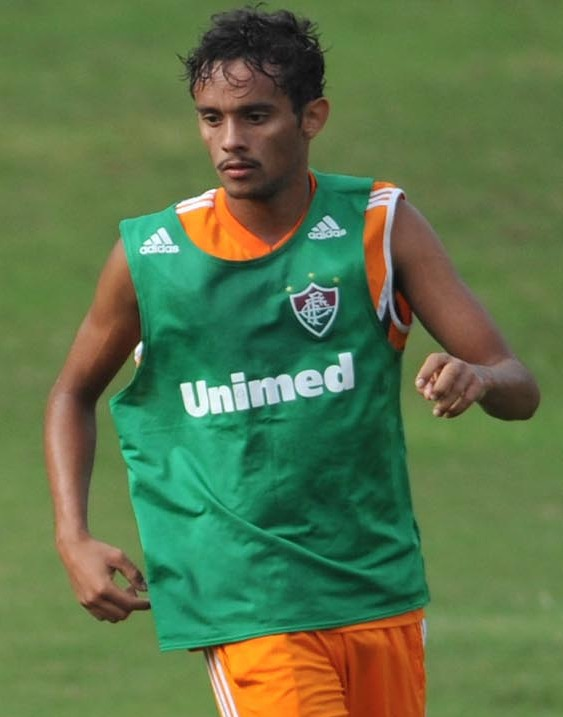
Scarpa training with Fluminense in 2014

Scarpa was born in Hortolândia, São Paulo, and played for Guarani, Santos, Paulínia and Desportivo Brasil, before joining Fluminense in 2012. He made his first-team – and Série A – debut on 1 June 2014, coming on as a late substitute for Rafael Sóbis in a 1–1 home draw against Internacional.

==== Loan to Red Bull Brasil ====
Scarpa was rarely used during the season, and was loaned to Red Bull Brasil on 22 December 2014. He scored his first senior goal for the latter side the following 11 February, netting his team's first in a 3–2 Campeonato Paulista away win against Bragantino; ten days later he added a further goal, scoring in a 2–2 home draw against São Bento.

==== Breakthrough ====
After featuring regularly, Scarpa returned to Flu in May 2015. He started to feature more regularly for the first team, which was managed by Enderson Moreira, often appearing as a left-back. He scored his first Série A goal on 9 July, netting the game's only in a home success over Cruzeiro.

On 28 September 2015, Scarpa renewed his contract until 2019, and finished the year as an undisputed starter. A mainstay in Fluminense's starting eleven during the 2016 campaign, he scored eight goals in the year's Brasileirão; highlights included a double in a 2–2 away draw against Internacional.

Scarpa started the 2017 season with four goals in six appearances, netting consecutive goals against Resende (1–0 home win), Portuguesa-RJ (3–0 away win), Bangu (4–0 home win) and Globo (5–2 away win); the latter came from the halfway line. On 25 February, in a 0–0 home draw against Madureira, he was replaced by Richarlison at half-time after suffering an ankle injury; it was later revealed that he would be out for two months. In the meantime, he further extended his contract until 2020.

In 2017, Scarpa went to court to request that his contract with Fluminense be cancelled for delayed payments on Fluminense's part. After a protracted, public battle, the court ruled with Scarpa, and his contract with Fluminense was deemed null and void on 11 January 2018.

=== Palmeiras ===
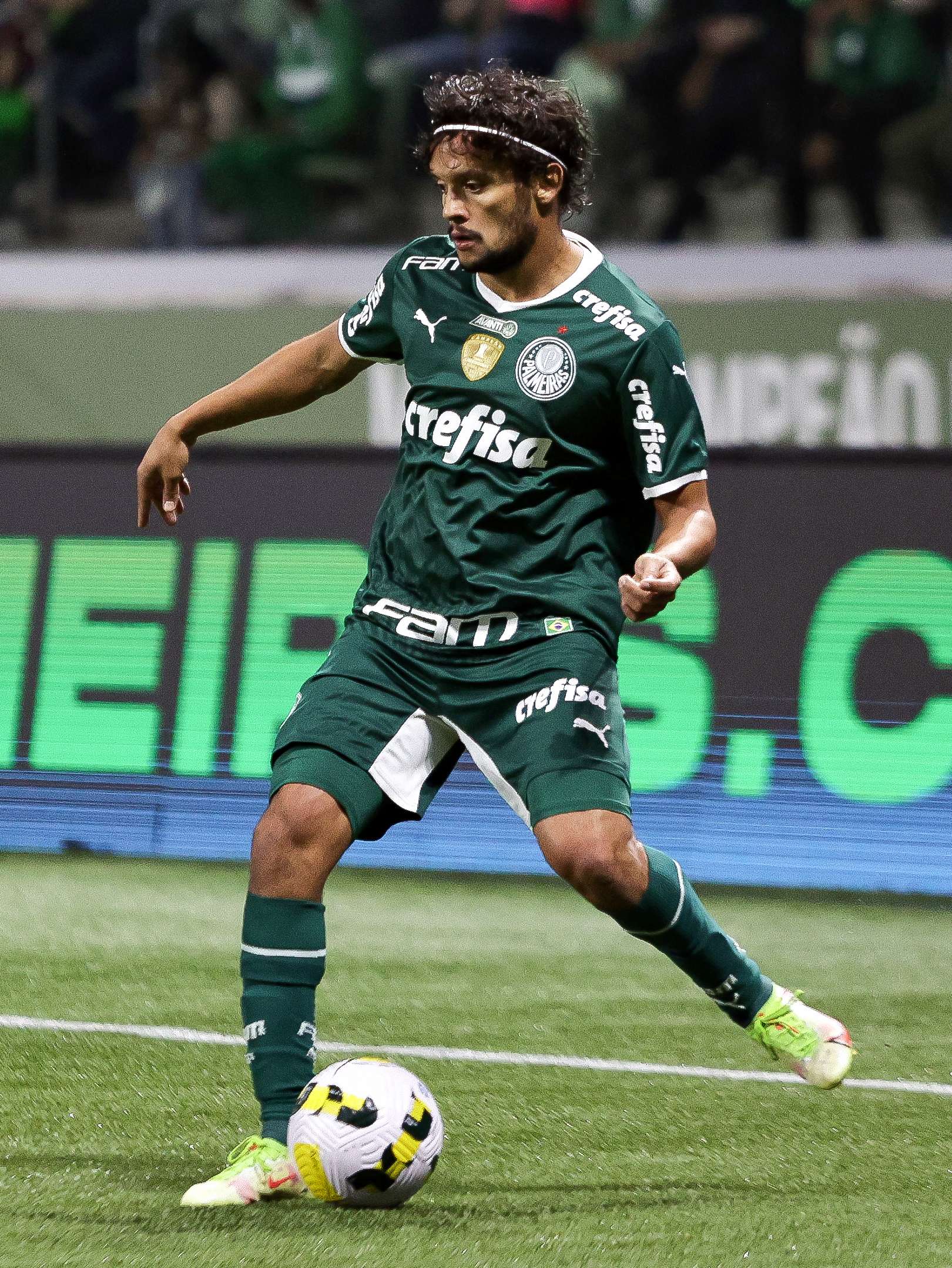
Scarpa with Palmeiras in 2022

Four days after the cancelation of his contract with Fluminense, Scarpa signed a five-year contract with Palmeiras on 15 January 2018. He enjoyed great success with the Verdão, with more than 200 appearances and eight trophies over four years, including two leagues, the Copa do Brasil and two Libertadores titles.

On 10 July 2022, TNT Sports Brazil reported that Scarpa had signed a pre-contract for three and a half years with Nottingham Forest on a free transfer, linking up with the recently promoted English club in January 2023.

=== Nottingham Forest ===
On 4 December 2022, it was officially announced that Scarpa would join Nottingham Forest on 1 January 2023 on a deal until June 2026. Scarpa made his Premier League debut for Forest on 4 January, coming on as a substitute in a 1–0 win at Southampton.

==== Loan to Olympiacos ====
Scarpa joined Olympiacos on loan for the 2023–24 season, on a season-long loan. However, his loan was terminated in January 2024 so he could secure a permanent transfer away from Nottingham Forest.

=== Atlético Mineiro ===
Following the termination of his loan at Olympiacos, Scarpa left Nottingham Forest and returned to Brazil, signing a four-year contract with Série A club Atlético Minero in January 2024, for a transfer fee reported to be around €5 million.

== International career ==
On 19 January 2017, Scarpa was called up by Tite for a friendly against Colombia. He made his full international debut six days later, replacing Lucas Lima in the 1–0 win at the Engenhão.

== Personal life ==
Scarpa is well known for his hobbies, including skateboarding, rock music, Rubik's cubes, wakeboarding and reading novels, all of which have received extensive attention thanks to his posts on social media and goal celebrations. Among his favourite pre-game songs are Dire Straits' "Sultans of Swing" and Lynyrd Skynyrd's "Free Bird", and his favourite books include Franz Kafka's The Metamorphosis and Fyodor Dostoevsky's Crime and Punishment and The Brothers Karamazov. In 2018, Palmeiras posted a video on social media of Scarpa playing the club's anthem on electric guitar to celebrate World Rock Day. In 2022, after Scarpa's love of Rubik's cubes went viral on social media, Palmeiras began to sell personalised Rubik's cubes in their club shop in his honour.

In March 2023, it was reported that Scarpa had lost a million pounds in a cryptocurrency scam and returned to Brazil before the end of the Premier League season in order to try to recover the funds.

== Career statistics ==
=== Club ===
As of match played 7 December 2025

Appearances and goals by club, season and competition
Club	Season	League			State League		National Cup		League Cup		Continental		Other		Total	
Club	Season	Division	Apps	Goals	Apps	Goals	Apps	Goals	Apps	Goals	Apps	Goals	Apps	Goals	Apps	Goals
Fluminense	2014	Série A	6	0	—		—		—		0	0	—		6	0
Fluminense	2015	Série A	28	5	—		6	1	—		—		—		34	6
Fluminense	2016	Série A	34	8	15	3	7	2	—		—		4 (Note: Appearance(s) in Primeira Liga)	1	60	14
Fluminense	2017	Série A	38	2	5	3	3	1	—		5 (Note: Appearance(s) in Copa Sudamericana)	1	—		51	7
Fluminense	Total		106	15	20	6	16	4	—		5	1	4	1	151	27
Red Bull Brasil (loan)	2015	Série D	0	0	11	2	—		—		—		—		11	2
Palmeiras	2018	Série A	12	2	7	2	1	0	—		2 (Note: Appearance(s) in Copa Libertadores)	0	—		22	4
Palmeiras	2019	Série A	27	4	11	3	1	0	—		8	6	—		47	13
Palmeiras	2020	Série A	26	1	8	1	5	1	—		6	1	2 (Note: Appearance(s) in FIFA Club World Cup)	0	47	4
Palmeiras	2021	Série A	31	4	13	2	2	0	—		7	1	4 (Note: One appearance in Supercopa do Brasil; one appearance, one goal in Recopa Sudamericana)	1	57	8
Palmeiras	2022	Série A	35	7	11	1	4	1	—		8	4	—		58	13
Palmeiras	Total		131	18	50	9	13	2	—		31	12	6	1	231	42
Nottingham Forest	2022–23	Premier League	6	0	—		1	0	3	0	—		—		10	0
Olympiacos (loan)	2023–24	Super League Greece	7	0	—		0	0	—		4 (Note: Appearance(s) in UEFA Europa League)	0	—		11	0
Atlético Mineiro	2024	Série A	32	4	11	1	10	1	—		12	3	—		65	9
Atlético Mineiro	2025	Série A	36	2	9	0	8	0	—		13	1	—		66	3
Atlético Mineiro	Total		68	6	20	1	18	1	—		25	4	—		131	12
Career total			318	39	91	11	48	7	3	0	63	17	10	2	535	82

=== International ===
As of 25 January 2017

Appearances and goals by national team and year
National team	Year	Apps	Goals
Brazil	2017	1	0
Total		1	0

== Honours ==
Fluminense

- Primeira Liga: 2016

Palmeiras

- Copa Libertadores: 2020, 2021
- Recopa Sudamericana: 2022
- Campeonato Brasileiro Série A: 2018, 2022
- Campeonato Paulista: 2020, 2022
- Copa do Brasil: 2020
- FIFA Club World Cup Runner Up: 2021

Atlético Mineiro

- Campeonato Mineiro: 2024, 2025

Individual

- Primeira Liga Best Player: 2016
- Campeonato Carioca Best Player: 2016
- Campeonato Carioca Team of the Year: 2016
- Troféu Mesa Redonda Best Player: 2022
- Best Attacking Midfielder in Brazil: 2022
- Bola de Prata: 2022
- Bola de Ouro: 2022
- Campeonato Brasileiro Série A Player of the Month: June 2021, June 2022, October 2022
- Campeonato Brasileiro Série A Best Player: 2022
- Campeonato Brasileiro Série A top assist provider: 2016 (10 assists), 2017 (12 assists), 2021 (13 assists) and 2022 (12 assists)
- Campeonato Brasileiro Série A Team of the Year: 2022
- Campeonato Paulista top assist provider: 2022 (6 assists)
- Copa Libertadores Team of the Tournament: 2019, 2022
- South American Team of the Year: 2022
- Campeonato Mineiro Team of the Year: 2025
