= Estádio Joaquim Portugal =

Brazilian football stadium

Joaquim Portugal
- Arena Sicredi; Coliseu
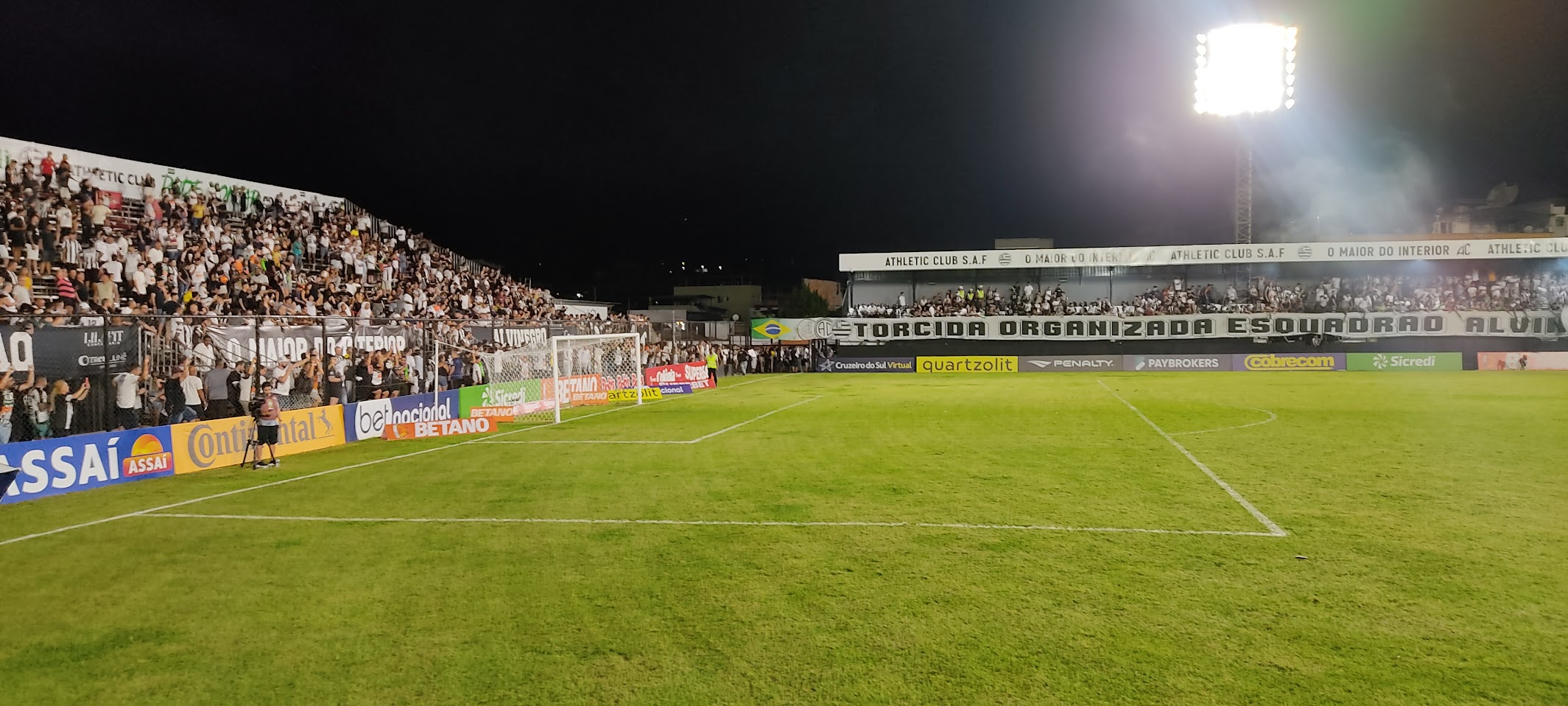
- Interactive map of Joaquim Portugal
- Full name: Estádio Joaquim Portugal
- Former names: Arena Unimed
- Location: São João del-Rei, MG, Brazil
- Coordinates: 21.1275°S 44.2434°W
- Capacity: 4 655
- Surface: Natural grass

Tenant
- Athletic-MG

Estádio Joaquim Portugal, also known as Arena Sicredi for naming rights, is a Brazilian football stadium built in São João del-Rei (state of Minas Gerais) in the Matosinhos neighborhood.

== Field command ==
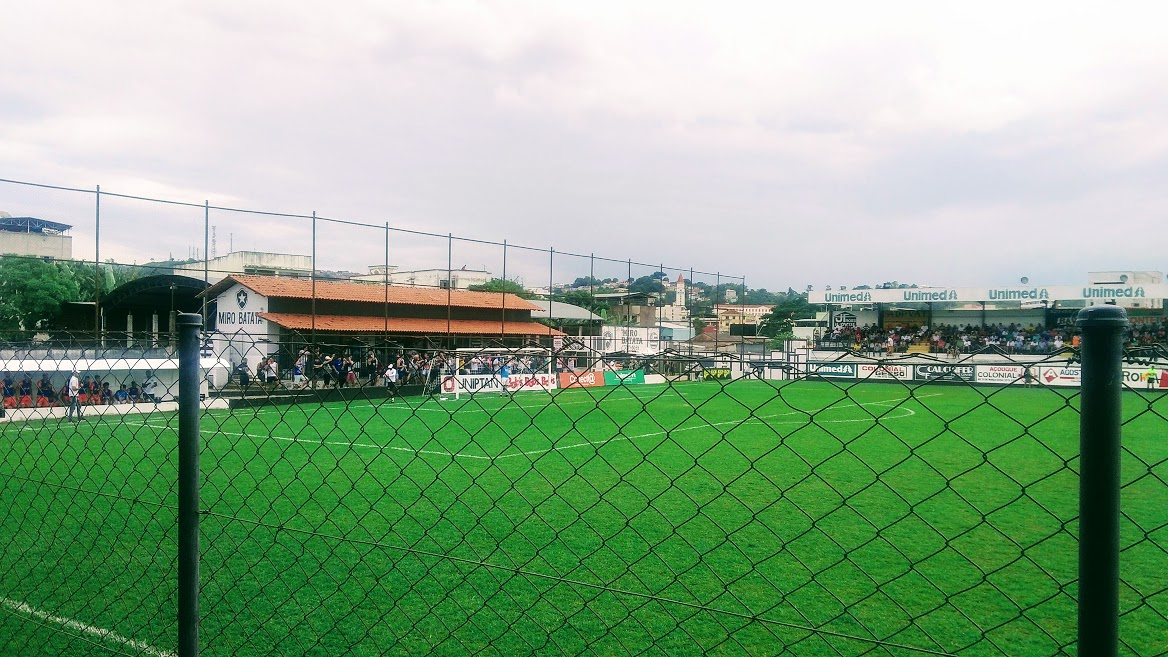
A view from inside the stadium in 2018

The stadium is where Athletic Club plays its games for the Campeonato Mineiro de Futebol.

=== Important matches ===
==== 2023 ====
===== Campeonato Mineiro - Módulo I =====
The stadium was the venue for the first match of the semifinal of 2023 Campeonato Mineiro - Módulo I between Athletic Club and Atlético Mineiro, on March 12, Sunday. Athletic defeated Atlético 1x0.

===== Copa do Brasil =====
The stadium hosted the 2023 Copa do Brasil match Athletic Club vs. Brasiliense on March 1, 2023. Brasiliense eliminated Athletic from the competition.

===== Campeonato Brasileiro - Série D =====
The stadium was one of the venues for the 2023 Campeonato Brasileiro - Série D, the fourth tier of the national championship.

== Capacity ==
The stadium originally had a capacity of 2,500 people but it was expanded to 4,655 people in 2024. It is one of the largest stadiums in the Intermediate Geographic Region of Barbacena.
