= Estádio Antônio Accioly =

Stadium in Goiânia, Brazil

Estádio Antonio Accioly
- Castelo do Dragão
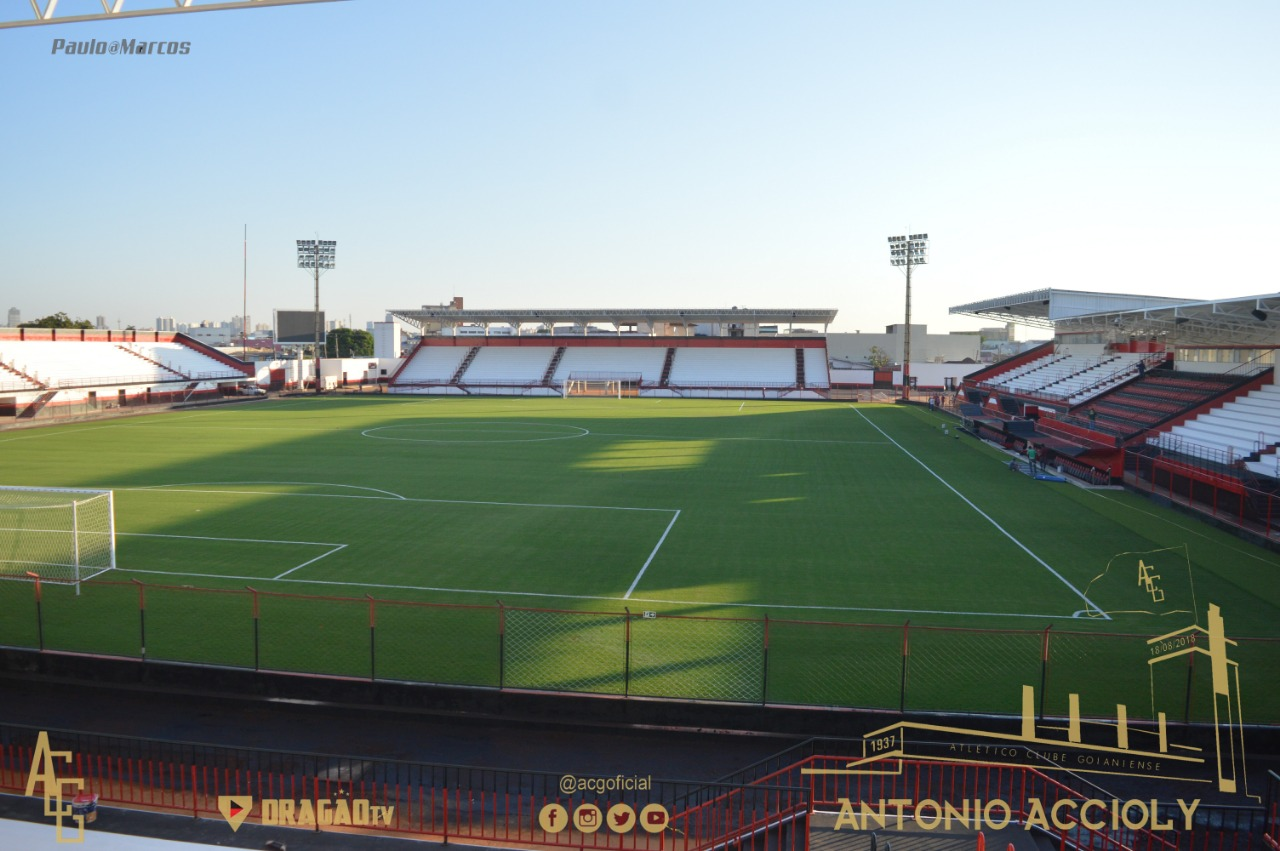
- Interactive map of Estádio Antonio Accioly
- Full name: Estádio Antonio Accioly
- Location: Goiânia, Goiás, Brazil
- Coordinates: 16°40′12.75″S 49°17′03.38″W
- Owner: Atlético Goianiense
- Operator: Atlético Goianiense
- Capacity: 12,500; 10,000 (international)
- Surface: Natural grass
- Field size: 105 x 68 m (344 x 223 ft)

Construction
- Opened: 18 August 2018
- Renovated: 2013, 2018, 2020

Tenant
- Atlético Goianiense

Estádio Antônio Accioly is a multi-use stadium located in Goiânia, Brazil. It is used mostly for football matches and hosts the home matches of Atlético Clube Goianiense. The stadium has a maximum capacity of 12,500 people.

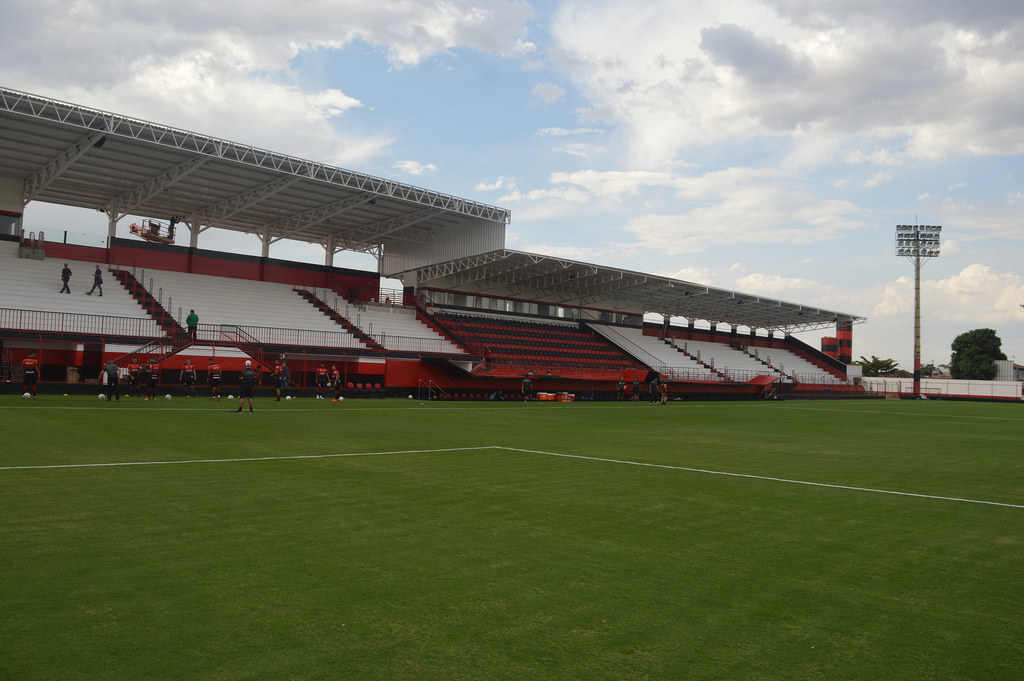
Estádio Antônio Accioly main terrace.
