= 2023 Campeonato Mineiro =

Football championship of Minas Gerais, Brazil

Campeonato Mineiro
- Season: 2023
- Dates: 21 January – 9 April
- Champions: Atlético Mineiro
- Relegated: Caldense; Democrata-SL
- Matches played: 54
- Goals scored: 136 (2.52 per match)
- Top goalscorer: (Brazil) Hulk (11 goals)

The 2023 Campeonato Mineiro (officially Campeonato Mineiro SICOOB 2023 – Módulo I for sponsorship reasons) is the 109th edition of the state championship of Minas Gerais organized by the FMF. The competition started on 21 January and ended on 9 April 2023.

Atlético Mineiro successfully defended its tri-championship and earned the 48th title.

== Format ==
=== First stage ===
The 2023 Módulo I first stage was played by the ten teams participating in 2022 Módulo I not relegated, in addition to the two teams promoted from 2022 Módulo II. The 12 teams are divided into three groups of four teams in the first phase; the teams will play against those clubs in the other groups. At the end of the first phase, the leaders of the 3 groups plus the best second place overall qualify for the semifinals.

=== Knockout stage ===
The knockout phase features the 4 qualified teams from the previous phase in a two-legged tie in the semi-finals and the finals, where the team with the best seed has the right to choose the order of the legs. In the event of an aggregate draw, the team with the best record in the first phase progresses.

=== Relegation ===
According to the change made by the Federação Mineira de Futebol, the descent will be decided in a triangular disputed by the three teams with the worst overall campaign in the initial phase. That is, not necessarily the last one of a group will dispute the triangular one, being able to have made a better campaign compared to other teams of other groups.

== Participating teams ==
Locations of the 2023 Campeonato Mineiro teams
Locations of the 2023 Campeonato Mineiro teams – city of Belo Horizonte

Team	Home city	Manager	2022 result
América Mineiro	Belo Horizonte	Vagner Mancini	5th
Athletic Club	São João del-Rei	Roger Silva	3rd
Atlético Mineiro	Belo Horizonte	Eduardo Coudet	1st
Caldense	Poços de Caldas	Thiago Oliveira	4th
Cruzeiro	Belo Horizonte	Paulo Pezzolano	2nd
Democrata-GV	Governador Valadares	Paulo César Schardong	7th
Democrata-SL	Sete Lagoas	Paulinho Guará	1st (Módulo II)
Ipatinga	Ipatinga	Waguinho Dias	2nd (Módulo II)
Patrocinense	Patrocínio	Tuca Guimarães	9th
Pouso Alegre	Pouso Alegre	Eugênio Souza	10th
Tombense	Tombos	Marcelo Chamusca	8th
Villa Nova	Nova Lima	Cícero Júnior	6th

== First stage ==
=== Group A ===
Pos	Team	Pld	W	D	L	GF	GA	GD	Pts	Qualification or relegation
1	Atlético Mineiro	8	6	2	0	15	5	+10	20	Knockout stage
2	Athletic Club	8	4	3	1	13	8	+5	15	Knockout stage
3	Villa Nova	8	3	1	4	8	14	−6	10	
4	Pouso Alegre	8	2	4	2	7	10	−3	10	

Source: FMF

=== Group B ===
Pos	Team	Pld	W	D	L	GF	GA	GD	Pts	Qualification or relegation
1	América Mineiro	8	5	3	0	15	6	+9	18	Knockout stage
2	Caldense	8	1	2	5	9	15	−6	5	Relegation stage
3	Patrocinense	8	1	1	6	8	13	−5	4	Relegation stage
4	Democrata-SL	8	0	4	4	6	12	−6	4	Relegation stage

Source: FMF

=== Group C ===
Pos	Team	Pld	W	D	L	GF	GA	GD	Pts	Qualification or relegation
1	Cruzeiro	8	3	3	2	11	7	+4	12	Knockout stage
2	Tombense	8	3	2	3	14	12	+2	11	
3	Democrata-GV	8	2	4	2	8	10	−2	10	
4	Ipatinga	8	2	3	3	9	11	−2	9	

Source: FMF

== Relegation stage ==
In the relegation stage, each team will be played the other two teams in a single round-robin tournament.

=== Standings and results ===
Pos	Team	Pld	W	D	L	GF	GA	GD	Pts	Relegation	PAT	CAL	DSL
1	Patrocinense	3	2	1	0	4	1	+3	7			1–0	2–0
2	Caldense (R)	4	1	1	2	3	3	0	4	2024 Módulo II	1–1		2–0
3	Democrata-SL (R)	3	1	0	2	1	4	−3	3	2024 Módulo II	Canceled	1–0	

Source: FMF
(R) Relegated

== Troféu Inconfidência ==
=== Bracket ===
Semi-finals
C2	Tombense	2	0	2
A4	Pouso Alegre	2	0	2
A3	Villa Nova	2	2	4
C3	Democrata-GV	0	0	0

Final
C2	Tombense	2	3	5
A3	Villa Nova	1	2	3

== Knockout stage ==
=== Bracket ===
Semi-finals
A2	Athletic Club	1	0	1
A1	Atlético Mineiro	0	1	1
C1	Cruzeiro	0	1	1
B1	América Mineiro	2	2	4

Final
A1	Atlético Mineiro	3	2	5
B1	América Mineiro	2	0	2

=== Semi-finals ===
==== Group F ====
12 March 2023
16:00

Athletic Club	1–0	Atlético Mineiro
Jonathan 45+4' (pen.)	Report

Estádio Joaquim Portugal, São João del Rei
Referee: Ronei Cândido Alves
18 March 2023
16:30

Atlético Mineiro	1–0	Athletic Club
Hulk 53'	Report

Independência, Belo Horizonte
Attendance: 21,760
Referee: Felipe Fernandes de Lima

Tied 1–1 on aggregate, Atlético Mineiro advanced to the finals due to their best performance in the first stage.

==== Group G ====
11 March 2023
16:30

Cruzeiro	0–2	América Mineiro
	Report	Aloísio 25'; Juninho 62'

Arena do Jacaré, Sete Lagoas
Attendance: 19,227
Referee: Paulo César Zanovelli
19 March 2023
18:00

América Mineiro	2–1	Cruzeiro
Aloísio 33'; Alê 90'	Report	Oliveira 77'

Independência, Belo Horizonte
Referee: André Luiz Policarpo Bento

América Mineiro advanced to the finals.

=== Finals ===
1 April 2023
16:30

América Mineiro	2–3	Atlético Mineiro
Benítez 45+3', 51'	Report	Pavón 2'; Hyoran 34'; Hulk 90+7'

Independência, Belo Horizonte
Attendance: 7,440
Referee: Paulo César Zanovelli
9 April 2023
16:30

Atlético Mineiro	2–0	América Mineiro
Hulk 27' (pen.), 71'	Report

Mineirão, Belo Horizonte
Attendance: 55,989
Referee: Flávio Rodrigues de Souza

== Top goalscorers ==
Rank	Player	Club	Goals
1	(Brazil) Hulk	Atletico Mineiro	11
2	(Brazil) Daniel Amorim	Tombense	10
3	(Brazil) Neto Costa	Patrocinense	5
4	(China) Aloísio	América-MG	4
4	(Brazil) Bruno Rodrigues	Cruzeiro	4
4	(Brazil) Dodô	Villa Nova	4
4	(Brazil) Luan	Villa Nova	4
4	(Brazil) Wellington Paulista	América-MG	4
