= 2024 Campeonato Mineiro =

Football championship of Minas Gerais, Brazil

Campeonato Mineiro
- Season: 2024
- Dates: 24 January – 7 April
- Champions: Atlético Mineiro
- Relegated: Ipatinga; Patrocinense
- Matches: 64
- Goals: 184 (2.88 per match)
- Top goalscorer: Hulk (7 goals)

The 2024 Campeonato Mineiro (officially Campeonato Mineiro SICOOB 2024 – Módulo I for sponsorship reasons) was the 110th edition of the state championship of Minas Gerais organized by the FMF. The competition started on 24 January and ended on 7 April 2024.

Atlético Mineiro successfully defended its tetra-championship and earned the 49th title in the club's history.

== Format ==
=== First stage ===
The 2024 Módulo I first stage will be played by the ten teams participating in 2023 Módulo I not relegated, in addition to the two teams promoted from 2023 Módulo II. The 12 teams are divided into three groups of four teams in the first phase; the teams will play against those clubs in the other groups. At the end of the first phase, the leaders of the 3 groups plus the best second place overall qualify for the semifinals.

=== Knockout stage ===
The knockout phase features the 4 qualified teams from the previous phase in a two-legged tie in the semi-finals and the finals, where the team with the best seed has the right to choose the order of the legs. In the event of an aggregate draw, the team with the best record in the first phase progresses.

=== Relegation ===
According to the change made by the Federação Mineira de Futebol, the descent will be decided in a triangular disputed by the three teams with the worst overall campaign in the initial phase. That is, not necessarily the last one of a group will dispute the triangular one, being able to have made a better campaign compared to other teams of other groups.

== Participating teams ==
Locations of the 2024 Campeonato Mineiro teams
Locations of the 2024 Campeonato Mineiro teams – city of Belo Horizonte

Team	Home city	Head coach	2023 result
América Mineiro	Belo Horizonte	Cauan de Almeida	2nd
Athletic Club	São João del-Rei	Rodrigo Santana	3rd
Atlético Mineiro	Belo Horizonte	Gabriel Milito	1st
Cruzeiro	Belo Horizonte	Nicolás Larcamón	4th
Democrata-GV	Governador Valadares	Wladimir Araújo	7th
Ipatinga	Ipatinga	Fabiano Braz	9th
Itabirito	Governador Valadares	Marcelo Caranhato	1st (Módulo II)
Patrocinense	Patrocínio	Rogério Henrique	10th
Pouso Alegre	Pouso Alegre	Gustavo Brancão	8th
Tombense	Tombos	Raul Cabral	5th
Uberlândia	Uberlândia	Wellington Fajardo	2nd (Módulo II)
Villa Nova	Nova Lima	Vinícius Munhoz	6th

== First stage ==
=== Group A ===
Pos	Team	Pld	W	D	L	GF	GA	GD	Pts	Qualification or relegation
1	Cruzeiro	8	6	1	1	15	5	+10	19	Knockout stage
2	Tombense	8	4	3	1	15	7	+8	15	Knockout stage
3	Itabirito	8	2	2	4	8	12	−4	8	
4	Ipatinga	8	2	1	5	9	17	−8	7	Relegation stage

Source: FMF

=== Group B ===
Pos	Team	Pld	W	D	L	GF	GA	GD	Pts	Qualification or relegation
1	Atlético Mineiro	8	4	2	2	14	6	+8	14	Knockout stage
2	Pouso Alegre	8	3	0	5	6	15	−9	9	
3	Uberlândia	8	2	2	4	7	11	−4	8	
4	Villa Nova	8	2	2	4	9	14	−5	8	

Source: FMF

=== Group C ===
Pos	Team	Pld	W	D	L	GF	GA	GD	Pts	Qualification or relegation
1	América Mineiro	8	5	3	0	18	2	+16	18	Knockout stage
2	Athletic Club	8	4	1	3	14	10	+4	13	
3	Patrocinense	8	2	2	4	7	14	−7	8	Relegation stage
4	Democrata-GV	8	2	1	5	7	16	−9	7	Relegation stage

Source: FMF

== Relegation stage ==
In the relegation stage, each team will be played the other two teams in a single round-robin tournament.

=== Standings and Results ===
Pos	Team	Pld	W	D	L	GF	GA	GD	Pts	Relegation	DGV	IPA	PAT
1	Democrata-GV	4	3	0	1	13	5	+8	9			4–1	3–0 w/o
2	Ipatinga (R)	4	3	0	1	11	7	+4	9	2025 Módulo II	4–3		3–0 w/o
3	Patrocinense (R)	4	0	0	4	0	12	−12	0	2025 Módulo II	0–3 w/o	0–3 w/o	

Source: FMF
(R) Relegated

== Troféu Inconfidência ==
=== Bracket ===
Semi-finals
A3	Itabirito	4	2	6
B2	Pouso Alegre	1	5	6
B3	Uberlândia	2	0	2
C2	Athletic Club	2	0	2

Final
C2	Athletic Club	3	3	6
B2	Pouso Alegre	1	0	1

== Knockout stage ==
=== Bracket ===
Semi-finals
B1	Atlético Mineiro	2	1	3
C1	América Mineiro	0	2	2
A2	Tombense	0	1	1
A1	Cruzeiro	0	3	3

Final
B1	Atlético Mineiro	2	3	5
A1	Cruzeiro	2	1	3

=== Semi-finals ===
==== Group F ====
10 March 2024
19:30

Tombense	0–0	Cruzeiro
	Report

Ipatingão, Ipatinga
Attendance: 21,261
Referee: Paulo César Zanovelli da Silva
16 March 2024
16:30

Cruzeiro	3–1	Tombense
Arthur Gomes 35'; Zé Vitor 69' (o.g.); Matheus Pereira 90+2'	Report	Zé Vitor 79'

Mineirão, Belo Horizonte
Attendance: 40,158
Referee: Felipe Fernandes de Lima

Cruzeiro advanced to the finals.

==== Group G ====
9 March 2024
16:30

Atlético Mineiro	2–0	América Mineiro
Paulinho 45'; Hulk 71'	Report

Arena MRV, Belo Horizonte
Attendance: 32,445
Referee: Caio Max Augusto Vieira
17 March 2024
19:00

América Mineiro	2–1	Atlético Mineiro
Bruno Fuchs 6' (o.g.); Vítor Jacaré 67'	Report	Paulinho 48'

Independência, Belo Horizonte
Attendance: 3,942
Referee: André Luiz Skettino Policarpo Bento

Atlético Mineiro advanced to the finals.

=== Finals ===
30 March 2024
16:30

Atlético Mineiro	2–2	Cruzeiro
Bruno Fuchs 8'; Hulk 26'	Report	Jemerson 49' (o.g.); Dinenno 90+5'

Arena MRV, Belo Horizonte
Attendance: 42,590
Referee: Felipe Fernandes de Lima
7 April 2024
15:30

Cruzeiro	1–3	Atlético Mineiro
Mateus Vital 52'	Report	Saravia 65'; Hulk 77' (pen.); Gustavo Scarpa 90+3'

Mineirão, Belo Horizonte
Attendance: 61,582
Referee: Flávio Rodrigues de Souza

== Top goalscorers ==
Rank	Player	Club	Goals
1	(Brazil) Hulk	Atlético Mineiro	7
2	(Uruguay) Gonzalo Mastriani	América Mineiro	6
2	(Brazil) Igor Bahia	Tombense	6
3	(Brazil) Jonathas	Athletic	5
3	(Argentina) Juan Dinenno	Cruzeiro	5
3	(Brazil) Luís Felipe	Ipatinga	5
