= 2016 CR Flamengo season =

Flamengo
2016 season
- Chairman: Eduardo Bandeira de Mello
- Manager: Muricy Ramalho (until 26 May), Zé Ricardo (since 27 May)
- Série A: 3rd
- Campeonato Carioca: Semi-finals
- Copa do Brasil: Second round
- Primeira Liga: Semi-finals
- Copa Sudamericana: Round of 16
- Top goalscorer: League: Paolo Guerrero (9); All: Paolo Guerrero (18)
- Highest home attendance: 65,743 (vs. Corinthians in the Estádio do Maracanã)
- Lowest home attendance: 2,705 (vs. Chapecoense in the Estádio Raulino de Oliveira)
- Average home league attendance: 25,462
Home colours	Away colours	Third colours

The 2016 season is the 121st year in the club's history, the 105th season in Clube de Regatas do Flamengo's football existence, and their 46th in the Brazilian Série A, having never been relegated from the top division.

This season Flamengo returned to the continental scenario after two years (last time playing in the 2014 Copa Libertadores) participating in the 2016 Copa Sudamericana, the last time Flamengo played in this competition was in 2011. The club also competed in the first edition of the Primeira Liga losing in the semi-finals to Atlético Paranaense. At Copa do Brasil the early elimination to Fortaleza in the second round gave the club a spot to play the Copa Sudamericana reaching the round of 16 being eliminated by Chilean club Palestino.

== Kits ==
For the first time in the club's history the football team have four different uniform kits for the season. The traditional striped home kit and white away kit, and two alternate kits.

Supplier: Adidas / Sponsor: Caixa / Back of the shirt: MRV / Lower back: YES! Idiomas / Shoulder: Universidade Brasil / Sleeves: iFood; Carabao / Numbers: TIM

Home	Home alternate	Away	Away alternate	Third	Fourth	Goalkeeper	Goalkeeper alternate

== Club ==
=== First-team staff ===
As of 18 July 2016.

Position	Name
Head coach	Zé Ricardo
General Manager	Rodrigo Caetano
Executive Director	Carlos Mozer
Assistant coach	Jayme de Almeida
Goalkeeping coach	Victor Hugo
Fitness coaches	Marcelo Martorelli
Fitness coaches	Carlito Macedo
Medical Staff Manager	Marcio Tannure
Doctors	Marcelo Soares
Doctors	Guilherme Runco
Doctors	Luiz Claudio Baldi
Doctors	Serafim Borges
Physiotherapists	Mario Peixoto
Physiotherapists	Walteriano da Silva

=== Other information ===
Chairman	(Brazil) Eduardo Bandeira de Mello
Ground (capacity and dimensions)	Estádio Giulite Coutinho (13,544 / 110×75 meters)
Ground (capacity and dimensions)	Estádio Raulino de Oliveira (20,255 / 105×68 meters)
Ground (capacity and dimensions)	Estádio do Pacaembu (37,730 / 105×68 meters)
Ground (capacity and dimensions)	Estádio Nacional (72,788 / 105×68 meters)
Ground (capacity and dimensions)	Arena das Dunas (31,375 / 105×68 meters)
Ground (capacity and dimensions)	Estádio Mário Helênio (31,863 / 105×68 meters)
Ground (capacity and dimensions)	Estádio Kléber Andrade (21,152 / 105×68 meters)
Ground (capacity and dimensions)	Estádio do Maracanã (78,838 / 105×68 meters)

Source: CBF

=== First-team squad ===
As of August 30, 2016

Note: Flags indicate national team as defined under FIFA eligibility rules; some limited exceptions apply. Players may hold more than one non-FIFA nationality.

No.	Pos.	Nation	Player
2	DF	BRA	Rodinei
4	DF	BRA	Juan (captain)
5	MF	BRA	Willian Arão
6	DF	BRA	Jorge
7	FW	BRA	Marcelo Cirino
8	MF	BRA	Márcio Araújo
9	FW	PER	Paolo Guerrero
10	MF	BRA	Ederson
11	FW	QAT	Emerson
15	DF	BRA	Réver (on loan from Internacional)
17	MF	BRA	Gabriel
18	FW	BRA	Leandro Damião (on loan from Santos)
19	MF	BRA	Alan Patrick (on loan from Shakhtar Donetsk)
21	DF	BRA	Pará (on loan from Grêmio)
22	MF	BRA	Éverton
23	MF	ARG	Federico Mancuello
25	DF	ARG	Alejandro Donatti

No.	Pos.	Nation	Player
26	MF	COL	Gustavo Cuéllar
30	DF	BRA	Chiquinho
31	FW	BRA	Fernandinho (on loan from Grêmio)
33	DF	BRA	Rafael Vaz
35	MF	BRA	Diego
37	MF	BRA	Adryan
38	GK	BRA	Alex Muralha
39	MF	BRA	Lucas Paquetá
40	FW	BRA	Thiago Santos
41	MF	BRA	Ronaldo
43	DF	BRA	Léo Duarte
44	GK	BRA	Thiago
46	DF	BRA	Thiago Ennes
47	FW	BRA	Felipe Vizeu
48	GK	BRA	Paulo Victor
–	MF	ARG	Lucas Mugni

Players with Dual Nationality

- (Qatar) (Brazil) Emerson
- (Argentina) (Italy) Federico Mancuello
- (Brazil) (Italy) Paulo Victor
- (Argentina) (Spain) Lucas Mugni

== Transfers ==
=== In ===
Date	Pos.	Name	From	Fee
19 July 2016	MF	(Brazil) Diego	(Turkey) Fenerbahçe	Free
14 July 2016	DF	(Argentina) Alejandro Donatti	(Argentina) Rosario Central	€1,8m
8 June 2016	DF	(Brazil) Rafael Vaz	(Brazil) Vasco da Gama	Free
20 January 2016	MF	(Colombia) Gustavo Cuéllar	(Colombia) Deportivo Cali	R$8m
6 January 2016	DF	(Brazil) Chiquinho	(Brazil) Santos	Free
4 January 2016	MF	(Argentina) Federico Mancuello	(Argentina) Independiente	R$12m
22 December 2015	GK	(Brazil) Alex Muralha	(Brazil) Figueirense	R$4m
14 December 2015	MF	(Brazil) Willian Arão	(Brazil) Botafogo	Free
10 December 2015	DF	(Brazil) Rodinei	(Brazil) Ponte Preta	Undisclosed
8 December 2015	DF	(Brazil) Juan	(Brazil) Internacional	Free

=== Out ===
Date	Pos.	Name	To	Fee
30 June 2016	DF	(Brazil) Anderson Pico	Released	Free
30 June 2016	DF	(Brazil) Welinton	Released	Free
30 May 2016	DF	(Brazil) Arthur Henrique	Released	Free
24 May 2016	DF	(Brazil) Wallace	(Brazil) Grêmio	R$3.2m
8 March 2016	FW	(Brazil) Kayke	(Japan) Yokohama F. Marinos	R$6m
8 January 2016	DF	(Brazil) Samir	(Italy) Udinese	R$8m

=== Loan in ===
Date from	Date to	Pos.	Name	From
12 July 2016	31 March 2017	FW	(Brazil) Leandro Damião	(Brazil) Santos
9 June 2016	31 March 2017	DF	(Brazil) Réver	(Brazil) Internacional
30 April 2016	30 June 2017	DF	(Brazil) Igor	(Brazil) Joinville
7 April 2016	31 December 2016	FW	(Brazil) Fernandinho	(Brazil) Grêmio
31 December 2015	13 July 2016	DF	(Brazil) Arthur Henrique	(Brazil) América (RN)

=== Loan out ===
Date from	Date to	Pos.	Name	To
29 August 2016	31 July 2017	GK	(Brazil) Daniel	(Israel) Maccabi Tel Aviv
27 August 2016	31 December 2016	DF	(Brazil) Rafael Dumas	(India) FC Goa
30 July 2016	31 July 2017	MF	(Argentina) Héctor Canteros	(Argentina) Vélez Sarsfield
19 July 2016	31 December 2016	FW	(Brazil) Nixon	(Brazil) América (MG)
12 July 2016	31 December 2016	MF	(Brazil) Luiz Antônio	(Brazil) Bahia
23 June 2016	30 June 2017	MF	(Brazil) Jonas	(Croatia) Dinamo Zagreb
9 June 2016	31 December 2017	MF	(Brazil) Muralha	(South Korea) Pohang Steelers
30 March 2016	31 December 2016	MF	(Brazil) Jajá	(Brazil) Avaí
23 February 2016	31 December 2016	MF	(Brazil) Douglas Baggio	(Brazil) Luverdense
11 February 2016	31 December 2016	GK	(Brazil) César	(Brazil) Ponte Preta
11 January 2016	31 December 2016	MF	(Brazil) Thomás	(Brazil) Joinville
1 January 2016	12 July 2016	MF	(Brazil) Luiz Antônio	(Brazil) Sport Recife
1 January 2016	31 December 2016	FW	(Brazil) Paulinho	(Brazil) Santos
1 January 2016	31 December 2016	DF	(Brazil) Léo	(Brazil) Atlético Paranaense

== Statistics ==
=== Appearances and goals ===
Last updated on 12 December 2016.

- Players in italic have left the club during the season.

No.	Pos	Nat	Player	Total		Série A		Sudamericana		Copa do Brasil		Primeira Liga		Rio State League	
No.	Pos	Nat	Player	Apps	Goals	Apps	Goals	Apps	Goals	Apps	Goals	Apps	Goals	Apps	Goals
2	DF	(Brazil)	Rodinei	36	1	13	0	2	0	4	0	3	0	14	1
3	DF	(Brazil)	César Martins	9	0	3	0	0	0	0	0	0	0	5+1	0
4	DF	(Brazil)	Juan	32	0	8+1	0	3	0	4	0	4	0	12	0
5	MF	(Brazil)	Willian Arão	62	6	37	4	2	0	4	0	4	1	15	1
6	DF	(Brazil)	Jorge	55	4	32	2	2	1	4	0	4	0	13	1
7	FW	(Brazil)	Marcelo Cirino	50	12	13+11	2	2+1	1	3+1	2	1+3	0	13+2	7
8	MF	(Brazil)	Márcio Araújo	52	0	36	0	3	0	0	0	3	0	9+1	0
9	FW	(Peru)	Paolo Guerrero	43	18	21	9	3	0	3	1	3	3	13	5
10	MF	(Brazil)	Ederson	21	1	4+4	1	0	0	2+2	0	1+1	0	5+2	0
11	FW	(Qatar)	Emerson	28	5	2+8	0	0+3	1	2	0	2+1	0	8+2	4
14	DF	(Brazil)	Wallace	21	0	0	0	0	0	3	0	4	0	14	0
15	DF	(Brazil)	Réver	30	2	29	2	1	0	0	0	0	0	0	0
17	MF	(Brazil)	Gabriel	44	4	15+7	3	1	0	3	0	3+1	0	6+8	1
18	FW	(Brazil)	Leandro Damião	16	2	8+7	2	1	0	0	0	0	0	0	0
19	MF	(Brazil)	Alan Patrick	46	8	18+10	4	3+1	2	3	1	1	0	4+6	1
20	MF	(Argentina)	Héctor Canteros	5	0	0+2	0	0	0	0	0	0+1	0	2	0
21	DF	(Brazil)	Pará	32	0	25+2	0	2	0	0	0	1	0	2	0
22	MF	(Brazil)	Éverton	40	5	25+4	3	1	1	1	0	3	1	2+4	0
23	MF	(Argentina)	Federico Mancuello	36	5	9+12	3	2+1	0	3	1	1	0	8	1
25	DF	(Argentina)	Alejandro Donatti	3	0	1+1	0	1	0	0	0	0	0	0	0
26	MF	(Colombia)	Gustavo Cuéllar	33	0	4+12	0	3	0	4	0	2	0	8	0
29	FW	(Brazil)	Nixon	0	0	0	0	0	0	0	0	0	0	0	0
30	DF	(Brazil)	Chiquinho	16	0	6+1	0	2+1	0	0	0	1	0	4+1	0
31	FW	(Brazil)	Fernandinho	29	4	11+14	3	2+2	1	0	0	0	0	0	0
33	DF	(Brazil)	Rafael Vaz	32	0	28+1	0	3	0	0	0	0	0	0	0
34	DF	(Brazil)	Rafael Dumas	1	0	0+1	0	0	0	0	0	0	0	0	0
35	MF	(Brazil)	Diego	18	6	17	6	1	0	0	0	0	0	0	0
37	MF	(Brazil)	Adryan	4	0	0+3	0	0+1	0	0	0	0	0	0	0
38	GK	(Brazil)	Alex Muralha	37	0	33	0	3	0	0	0	0	0	1	0
39	FW	(Brazil)	Lucas Paquetá	2	0	0	0	0	0	0	0	0+1	0	0+1	0
40	MF	(Brazil)	Thiago Santos	6	1	0+4	0	0	0	0	0	0	0	1+1	1
41	MF	(Brazil)	Ronaldo	2	0	0+1	0	0+1	0	0	0	0	0	0	0
43	DF	(Brazil)	Léo Duarte	9	0	7	0	0	0	1	0	0	0	1	0
44	GK	(Brazil)	Thiago	0	0	0	0	0	0	0	0	0	0	0	0
45	GK	(Brazil)	Daniel	0	0	0	0	0	0	0	0	0	0	0	0
46	DF	(Brazil)	Thiago Ennes	0	0	0	0	0	0	0	0	0	0	0	0
47	FW	(Brazil)	Felipe Vizeu	26	8	10+5	5	0+1	0	0+1	0	1+1	0	3+4	3
48	GK	(Brazil)	Paulo Victor	29	0	5	0	1	0	4	0	4	0	15	0

=== Top scorers ===
Includes all competitive matches

Rank	Nation	Number	Name	Série A	Sudamericana	Copa do Brasil	Primeira Liga	Rio State League	Total
1	(Peru)	9	Paolo Guerrero	9	0	1	3	5	18
2	(Brazil)	7	Marcelo Cirino	2	1	2	0	7	12
3	(Brazil)	19	Alan Patrick	4	2	1	0	1	8
3	(Brazil)	47	Felipe Vizeu	5	0	0	0	3	8
5	(Brazil)	5	Willian Arão	4	0	0	0	3	7
6	(Brazil)	35	Diego	6	0	0	0	0	6
7	(Argentina)	23	Federico Mancuello	3	0	1	0	1	5
7	(Brazil)	22	Éverton	3	1	0	1	0	5
7	(Qatar)	11	Emerson	0	1	0	0	4	5
10	(Brazil)	31	Fernandinho	3	1	0	0	0	4
10	(Brazil)	17	Gabriel	3	0	0	0	1	4
10	(Brazil)	6	Jorge	2	1	0	0	1	4
13	(Brazil)	18	Leandro Damião	2	0	0	0	0	2
13	(Brazil)	15	Réver	2	0	0	0	0	2
15	(Brazil)	14	Wallace	0	0	0	0	1	1
15	(Brazil)	2	Rodinei	0	0	0	0	1	1
15	(Brazil)	40	Thiago Santos	0	0	0	0	1	1
15	(Brazil)	10	Ederson	1	0	0	0	0	1
Own Goal				3	0	0	0	0	3
Total				52	7	5	4	29	97

=== Disciplinary record ===
Position	Nation	Number	Name	Série A			Sudamericana			Copa do Brasil			Primeira Liga			Rio State League			Total		
Position	Nation	Number	Name	Yellow card	(yellow card) (red card)	Red card	Yellow card	(yellow card) (red card)	Red card	Yellow card	(yellow card) (red card)	Red card	Yellow card	(yellow card) (red card)	Red card	Yellow card	(yellow card) (red card)	Red card	Yellow card	(yellow card) (red card)	Red card
DF	(Brazil)	2	Rodinei	1	0	0	1	0	0	0	0	0	1	0	0	3	0	0	6	0	0
DF	(Brazil)	3	César Martins	1	0	1	0	0	0	0	0	0	0	0	0	1	0	0	2	0	1
DF	(Brazil)	4	Juan	2	0	0	1	0	0	1	0	0	0	0	0	3	0	0	7	0	0
MF	(Brazil)	5	Willian Arão	5	0	0	1	0	0	0	0	0	0	0	0	0	0	0	6	0	0
DF	(Brazil)	6	Jorge	5	0	0	0	0	0	1	0	0	0	0	0	2	0	0	7	0	0
FW	(Brazil)	7	Marcelo Cirino	2	0	0	0	0	0	0	0	0	0	0	0	0	0	0	2	0	0
MF	(Brazil)	8	Márcio Araújo	2	1	0	0	0	0	0	0	0	0	0	0	1	0	0	3	1	0
FW	(Peru)	9	Paolo Guerrero	7	0	0	0	0	0	1	0	0	0	0	0	5	0	0	13	0	0
MF	(Brazil)	10	Ederson	2	0	0	0	0	0	1	0	0	0	0	0	0	0	0	3	0	0
FW	(Qatar)	11	Emerson	3	0	0	0	0	0	0	0	0	0	0	0	0	0	0	3	0	0
DF	(Brazil)	14	Wallace	0	0	0	0	0	0	0	0	0	1	0	0	4	1	0	5	1	0
DF	(Brazil)	15	Réver	3	0	0	0	0	0	0	0	0	0	0	0	0	0	0	3	0	0
FW	(Brazil)	17	Gabriel	0	0	0	1	0	0	0	0	0	0	0	0	0	0	0	1	0	0
FW	(Brazil)	18	Leandro Damião	3	0	0	1	0	0	0	0	0	0	0	0	0	0	0	4	0	0
FW	(Brazil)	19	Alan Patrick	2	0	0	0	0	0	0	0	0	0	0	0	0	0	1	2	0	1
MF	(Argentina)	20	Héctor Canteros	0	0	0	0	0	0	0	0	0	0	0	0	0	0	0	0	0	0
DF	(Brazil)	21	Pará	3	0	0	0	0	0	0	0	0	0	0	0	0	0	0	3	0	0
MF	(Brazil)	22	Éverton	6	0	1	0	0	0	1	0	0	0	0	0	1	0	0	8	0	1
MF	(Argentina)	23	Federico Mancuello	3	1	0	0	0	0	0	0	0	0	0	0	2	0	0	5	1	0
DF	(Argentina)	25	Alejandro Donatti	0	0	0	0	0	0	0	0	0	0	0	0	0	0	0	0	0	0
MF	(Colombia)	26	Gustavo Cuéllar	0	0	0	1	0	0	2	0	0	0	0	0	3	0	1	6	0	1
FW	(Brazil)	29	Nixon	0	0	0	0	0	0	0	0	0	0	0	0	0	0	0	0	0	0
DF	(Brazil)	30	Chiquinho	1	0	0	1	0	0	0	0	0	0	0	0	0	0	0	2	0	0
MF	(Brazil)	31	Fernandinho	2	1	0	0	0	0	0	0	0	0	0	0	0	0	0	2	1	0
DF	(Brazil)	33	Rafael Vaz	4	0	0	1	0	0	0	0	0	0	0	0	0	0	0	5	0	0
DF	(Brazil)	34	Rafael Dumas	0	0	0	0	0	0	0	0	0	0	0	0	0	0	0	0	0	0
MF	(Brazil)	35	Diego	3	0	0	0	0	0	0	0	0	0	0	0	0	0	0	3	0	0
MF	(Brazil)	37	Adryan	0	0	0	0	0	0	0	0	0	0	0	0	0	0	0	0	0	0
GK	(Brazil)	38	Alex Muralha	3	0	0	0	0	0	0	0	0	0	0	0	0	0	0	3	0	0
MF	(Brazil)	39	Lucas Paquetá	0	0	0	0	0	0	0	0	0	0	0	0	1	0	0	1	0	0
MF	(Brazil)	40	Thiago Santos	0	0	0	0	0	0	0	0	0	0	0	0	0	0	0	0	0	0
MF	(Brazil)	41	Ronaldo	0	0	0	1	0	0	0	0	0	0	0	0	0	0	0	1	0	0
FW	(Brazil)	43	Léo Duarte	2	0	0	0	0	0	0	0	0	0	0	0	0	0	0	2	0	0
GK	(Brazil)	44	Thiago	0	0	0	0	0	0	0	0	0	0	0	0	0	0	0	0	0	0
GK	(Brazil)	45	Daniel	0	0	0	0	0	0	0	0	0	0	0	0	0	0	0	0	0	0
DF	(Brazil)	46	Thiago Ennes	0	0	0	0	0	0	0	0	0	0	0	0	0	0	0	0	0	0
FW	(Brazil)	47	Felipe Vizeu	0	0	0	0	0	0	0	0	0	0	0	0	0	0	0	0	0	0
GK	(Brazil)	48	Paulo Victor	0	0	0	0	0	0	0	0	0	0	0	0	0	0	0	0	0	0
Total				64	3	2	8	0	0	7	0	0	2	0	0	26	1	2	107	4	4

=== Overview ===
Competition	First match	Last match	Starting round	Final position	Record							
Competition	First match	Last match	Starting round	Final position	Pld	W	D	L	GF	GA	GD	Win %
Série A	14 May 2016	11 December 2016	Matchday 1	3rd	38	20	11	7	52	35	+17	52.63
Copa do Brasil	16 March 2016	18 May 2016	First stage	Second stage	4	1	0	3	5	5	+0	25.00
Campeonato Carioca	30 January 2016	24 April 2016	Matchday 1	Semifinals	16	9	4	3	29	10	+19	56.25
Primeira Liga	27 January 2016	23 March 2016	Group stage	Semifinals	4	2	1	1	4	2	+2	50.00
Total					62	32	16	14	90	52	+38	51.61

Source: Competitions

== Pre-season and friendlies ==
21 January 2016 Friendly	Ceará	3–3	Flamengo	Fortaleza
21:35	Siloé 26'; Bill 49'; Serginho 87'		Emerson 58'; Salazar 83' (o.g.); Emerson 86'	Stadium: Castelão

24 January 2016 Friendly	Santa Cruz	3–1	Flamengo	Recife
11:00	Grafite 43'; João Paulo 52'; Arthur 90+1'	Report	Willian Arão 22'	Stadium: Estádio do Arruda

== Competitions ==
=== Rio State League (Campeonato Carioca) ===
==== Group stage ====
Pos	Team	Pld	W	D	L	GF	GA	GD	Pts	Qualification
1	Botafogo	8	7	1	0	12	3	+9	22	Taça Guanabara
2	Flamengo	8	6	1	1	19	4	+15	19	Taça Guanabara
3	Volta Redonda	8	3	4	1	13	10	+3	13	Taça Guanabara
4	Madureira	8	3	3	2	12	12	0	12	Taça Guanabara
5	America	8	3	2	3	9	9	0	11	Taça Rio
6	Friburguense	8	3	2	3	10	13	−3	11	Taça Rio
7	Tigres do Brasil	8	1	1	6	6	17	−11	4	Taça Rio
8	Bonsucesso	8	0	1	7	6	22	−16	1	Taça Rio

Updated to match(es) played on 3 March 2016. Source:
Rules for classification: 1) points; 2) goal difference; 3) number of goals scored.

==== Matches ====
30 January 2016 1	Flamengo	1–1	Boavista	Rio de Janeiro
	Guerrero 29'	Summary	Leandrão 77'	Stadium: Estádio do Maracanã; Attendance: 7,318; Referee: Leonardo Garcia Cavaleiro

3 February 2016 2	Macaé	0–2	Flamengo	Macaé
		Summary	Wallace 45'; Marcelo Cirino 74'	Stadium: Moacyrzão; Attendance: 4,926; Referee: Rodrigo Carvalhaes de Miranda

10 February 2016 3	Portuguesa	0–5	Flamengo	Volta Redonda
	Márcio (yellow card) 53' (yellow card) 72' (red card); Allan (yellow card) 58' (yellow card) 69' (red card)	Summary	Guerrero 31'; Willian Arão 34', 60'; Emerson 74' (pen.); Rodinei 90'	Stadium: Estádio Raulino de Oliveira; Attendance: 8,205; Referee: Philip Georg Bennett

14 February 2016 4	Vasco da Gama	1–0	Flamengo	Rio de Janeiro
	Rafael Vaz 90'	Summary		Stadium: Estádio São Januário; Attendance: 14,364; Referee: Leonardo Garcia Cavaleiro

21 February 2016 5	Fluminense	1–2	Flamengo	Brasília
	Marcos Júnior (red card) 52'; Gustavo Scarpa 82'	Summary	Willian Arão 14'; Guerrero 48'; Cuéllar (red card) 52'; Wallace (yellow card) 80' (yellow card) 86' (red card)	Stadium: Estádio Nacional Mané Garrincha; Attendance: 32,024; Referee: Bruno Arleu de Araujo

24 February 2016 6	Cabofriense	0–1	Flamengo	Macaé
		Summary	Vizeu 9'	Stadium: Moacyrzão; Attendance: 2,616; Referee: Carlos Eduardo Nunes Braga

28 February 2016 7	Flamengo	5–0	Resende	Volta Redonda
	Emerson 1', 85'; Marcelo Cirino 6', 52'; Gabriel 53'	Summary		Stadium: Estádio Raulino de Oliveira; Attendance: 9,105; Referee: Luis Antonio Silva dos Santos

5 March 2016 8	Flamengo	3–1	Bangu	Volta Redonda
	Vizeu 34', 58'; Thiago Santos 45'	Summary	William Amendoim 24'	Stadium: Estádio Raulino de Oliveira; Attendance: 3,976; Referee: João Ennio Sobral

For their last match in the group stage, each team played a team from the other group.

==== Taça Guanabara ====
Pos	Team	Pld	W	D	L	GF	GA	GD	Pts	Qualification
2	Fluminense	7	4	2	1	10	3	+7	14	Advanced in Semifinals
3	Botafogo	7	4	2	1	8	4	+4	14	Advanced in Semifinals
4	Flamengo	7	3	3	1	10	4	+6	12	Advanced in Semifinals
5	Volta Redonda	7	2	2	3	6	8	−2	8	Taça Rio
6	Boavista	7	2	0	5	3	10	−7	6	Taça Rio

Rules for classification: 1) points; 2) goal difference; 3) number of goals scored.

==== Matches ====
12 March 2016 1	Flamengo	1–0	Madureira	Volta Redonda
	Emerson 62' (pen.)	Summary	Ayrton (yellow card) 65' (yellow card) 90+1' (red card)	Stadium: Estádio Raulino de Oliveira; Attendance: 4,173; Referee: Mauricio Machado Coelho Junior

20 March 2016 2	Flamengo	0–0	Fluminense	São Paulo
		Summary		Stadium: Estádio do Pacaembu; Attendance: 30,188; Referee: Rodrigo Carvalhaes de Miranda

26 March 2016 3	Volta Redonda	1–0	Flamengo	Volta Redonda
	Pernão 85'	Summary		Stadium: Estádio Raulino de Oliveira; Attendance: 3,112; Referee: Joao Batista de Arruda

30 March 2016 4	Flamengo	1–1	Vasco de Gama	Brasília
	Marcelo Cirino 79'	Summary	Riascos 82'; Jomar (red card) 82'	Stadium: Estádio Nacional de Brasília; Attendance: 26,917; Referee: Wagner do Nascimento Magalhaes

2 April 2016 5	Botafogo	2–2	Flamengo	Juiz de Fora
	Carli 14'; Rodrigo Lindoso 56'	Summary	Alan Patrick 32'; Marcelo Cirino 80'	Stadium: Estádio Mário Helênio; Attendance: 16,150; Referee: Luis Antonio Silva dos Santos

9 April 2016 6	Flamengo	3–0	Boavista	Volta Redonda
	Mancuello 18'; Marcelo Cirino 30'; Guerrero 58'	Summary		Stadium: Estádio Raulino de Oliveira; Attendance: 4,286; Referee: Leonardo Garcia Cavaleiro

17 April 2016 7	Bangu	0–3	Flamengo	Macaé
		Summary	Marcelo Cirino 37'; Guerrero 82'; Jorge 90'	Stadium: Moacyrzão; Attendance: 5,265; Referee: Pericles Bassols Pegado Cortez

==== Final stage ====
Semi-finals
Vasco da Gama	2
Flamengo	0
Fluminense	0
Botafogo	1

Finals
Vasco da Gama	1	1
Botafogo	0	1

==== Semifinal ====
24 April 2016	Vasco da Gama	2–0	Flamengo	Manaus
	Andrezinho 22'; Riascos 56'	Summary	Alan Patrick (red card) 79'	Stadium: Arena da Amazônia; Attendance: 44,419; Referee: Leonardo Garcia Cavaleiro

=== Copa do Brasil ===
==== First stage ====
16 March 2016 First leg	Confiança	1–0	Flamengo	Aracaju
	Everton 79'; Elielton (red card) 8'	Report		Stadium: Estádio Lourival Baptista; Attendance: 13,062; Referee: Emerson Luiz Sobral

20 April 2016 Second leg	Flamengo	3–0 (3–1 agg.)	Confiança	Volta Redonda
	Mancuello 27'; Marcelo Cirino 55', 65'	Report		Stadium: Estádio Raulino de Oliveira; Attendance: 5,053; Referee: Vinicius Gonçalves Dias Araujo

=== Second stage ===
4 May 2016 First stage	Fortaleza	2–1	Flamengo	Fortaleza
	Anselmo 20'; Felipe 72'	Report	Guerrero 65'	Stadium: Castelão; Attendance: 36,213; Referee: Marielson Alves Silva

18 May 2016 Second stage	Flamengo	1–2 (2–4 agg.)	Fortaleza	Volta Redonda
	Alan Patrick 88'	Report	Pio 3', 64'	Stadium: Estádio Raulino de Oliveira; Attendance: 5,193; Referee: Diego Almeida Real

==== Average attendances ====
Includes all home matches in the 2016 Copa do Brasil.

Stadium	Matches	Average	Highest attendance	Lowest attendance
Estádio Raulino de Oliveira	2	5,123	5,193	5,053
Total	2	5,123	5,193	5,053

=== Série A ===
The fixtures for the 2016 season were announced on 25 April 2016. Flamengo began their league campaign with a 1–0 win at home against Sport Recife on 14 May 2016, with Éverton scoring the only goal of the match. This was also the only match in the league with coach Muricy Ramalho commanding the team, later in the same week the veteran head coach had heart problems–he was quickly hospitalized and resigned from the job weeks later. After few matches as interim, Zé Ricardo took charge as the new head coach.

==== League table ====
Pos	Team	Pld	W	D	L	GF	GA	GD	Pts	Qualification or relegation
1	Palmeiras (C)	38	24	8	6	62	32	+30	80	Qualification for 2017 Copa Libertadores group stage
2	Santos	38	22	5	11	59	35	+24	71	Qualification for 2017 Copa Libertadores group stage
3	Flamengo	38	20	11	7	52	35	+17	71	Qualification for 2017 Copa Libertadores group stage
4	Atlético Mineiro	38	17	11	10	61	53	+8	62 (Note: The matchday 38 game between Chapecoense and Atlético Mineiro was cancelled after both teams declined to play following the Chapecoense team plane crash. Both teams received a double walkover (3–0 loss for each team).)	Qualification for 2017 Copa Libertadores group stage
5	Botafogo	38	17	8	13	43	39	+4	59	Qualification for 2017 Copa Libertadores first stage

Source: CBF
Rules for classification: 1) points; 2) wins; 3) goal difference; 4) goals scored; 5) head-to-head results; 6) least red cards received; 7) least yellow cards received; 8) draw.
(C) Champions

==== Results summary ====
Overall								Home						Away					
Pld	W	D	L	GF	GA	GD	Pts	W	D	L	GF	GA	GD	W	D	L	GF	GA	GD
38	20	11	7	52	35	+17	71	12	5	2	31	16	+15	8	6	5	21	19	+2

Last updated: 12 December 2016.
Source: Competitive matches

==== Results by round ====
Round	1	2	3	4	5	6	7	8	9	10	11	12	13	14	15	16	17	18	19	20	21	22	23	24	25	26	27	28	29	30	31	32	33	34	35	36	37	38
Ground	H	A	H	A	H	H	A	A	H	A	H	H	A	H	A	H	A	A	H	A	H	A	H	A	A	H	H	A	H	A	A	H	A	H	A	H	H	A
Result	W	L	D	W	W	L	L	W	D	W	L	W	L	W	D	W	W	D	W	L	W	W	W	W	D	W	W	D	W	W	L	D	D	D	W	D	W	D
Position	5	12	11	5	4	6	6	7	6	4	6	5	7	6	6	6	5	6	4	6	4	2	2	2	2	2	2	2	2	2	2	2	2	3	3	3	2	3

Updated to match(es) played on 12 December 2016. Source: Matches
A = Away; H = Home; W = Win; D = Draw; L = Loss

==== Average attendances ====
Includes all home matches in the 2016 Série A.

Stadium	Matches	Average	Highest attendance	Lowest attendance
Estádio Raulino de Oliveira	3	6,084	9,382	2,705
Estádio Nacional	4	31,960	54,665	22,552
Arena das Dunas	1	25,946	25,946	25,946
Estádio Kléber Andrade	4	17,719	21,000	15,680
Estádio do Pacaembu	2	26,515	29,605	23,427
Estádio do Maracanã	4	48,386	65,743	37,615
Total attendance	19	25,462	483,781	

==== Matches ====
Goals and red cards are shown.

14 May 2016 1	Flamengo	1–0	Sport	Volta Redonda
16:00	Éverton 5'		Rithely (red card) 46'	Stadium: Estádio Raulino de Oliveira; Attendance: 9,382; Referee: Marcelo Aparecido Ribeiro de Souza

22 May 2016 2	Grêmio	1–0	Flamengo	Porto Alegre
16:00	Fred 54'			Stadium: Arena do Grêmio; Attendance: 15,976; Referee: Luiz Flavio de Olivera

25 May 2016 3	Flamengo	2–2	Chapecoense	Volta Redonda
21:00	Vizeu 8'; Éverton (red card) 68'; Alan Patrick 90+6' (pen.)		Rangel 13' (pen.); Hyoran 80'	Stadium: Estádio Raulino de Oliveira; Attendance: 2,705; Referee: Diego Almeida Real

29 May 2016 4	Ponte Preta	1–2	Flamengo	Campinas
11:00	Wellington Paulista 12'		Azevedo 21' (o.g.); Jorge 42'; Fernandinho (yellow card) 51' (yellow card) 62' (red card)	Stadium: Estádio Moisés Lucarelli; Attendance: 7,106; Referee: Anderson Daronco

2 June 2016 5	Flamengo	1–0	Vitória	Volta Redonda
21:00	Vizeu 64'			Stadium: Estádio Raulino de Oliveira; Attendance: 6,164; Referee: Igor Junior Benevenuto

5 June 2016 6	Flamengo	1–2	Palmeiras	Brasília
16:00	Alan Patrick 6'; César (red card) 70'		Jesus 4'; Jean 72' (pen.)	Stadium: Estádio Nacional; Attendance: 54,665; Referee: Dewson Fernando Freitas da Silva

12 June 2016 7	Figueirense	1–0	Flamengo	Florianópolis
16:00	Moura 42'			Stadium: Estádio Orlando Scarpelli; Attendance: 10,948; Referee: Leandro Vuaden

15 June 2016 8	Cruzeiro	0–1	Flamengo	Belo Horizonte
21:45			Réver 43'	Stadium: Mineirão; Attendance: 17,593; Referee: Raphael Claus

19 June 2016 9	Flamengo	2–2	São Paulo	Brasília
16:00	Rodrigo Caio 22' (o.g.); Arão 59'		Calleri 12', 51' (yellow card) 65' (yellow card) 68' (red card)	Stadium: Estádio Nacional; Attendance: 27,233; Referee: Elmo Alves Resende Cunha

22 June 2016 10	Santa Cruz	0–1	Flamengo	Recife
21:00			Arão 15'	Stadium: Estádio do Arruda; Attendance: 12,739; Referee: Wagner Reway

26 June 2016 11	Flamengo	1–2	Fluminense	Natal
16:00	Guerrero 58'		Arão 48' (o.g.); Richarlison 76'	Stadium: Arena das Dunas; Attendance: 25,946; Referee: Luiz Flavio de Olivera

29 June 2016 12	Flamengo	1–0	Internacional	Cariacica
19:30	Ederson 19'			Stadium: Estádio Kléber Andrade; Attendance: 21,000; Referee: Ricardo Marques Ribeiro

3 July 2016 13	Corinthians	4–0	Flamengo	São Paulo
16:00	Romero 59', 89'; Guilherme 78'; Rildo 80'			Stadium: Arena Corinthians; Attendance: 32,577; Referee: Heber Roberto Lopes

10 July 2016 14	Flamengo	2–0	Atlético Mineiro	Brasília
11:00	Vizeu 12', 57'			Stadium: Estádio Nacional; Attendance: 23,390; Referee: Marielson Alves Silva

16 July 2016 15	Botafogo	3–3	Flamengo	Rio de Janeiro
16:00	Barbosa 34'; Neílton 80'; Salgueiro 83'		Éverton 24'; Jorge 57'; Guerrero 68'	Stadium: Arena Botafogo; Attendance: 11,692; Referee: Flavio Rodrigues de Souza

25 July 2016 16	Flamengo	2–1	América (MG)	Cariacica
20:00	Guerrero 55'; Alan Patrick 59' (pen.)		Juninho 76'	Stadium: Estádio Kléber Andrade; Attendance: 16,523; Referee: Rodrigo Batista Raposo

31 July 2016 17	Coritiba	0–2	Flamengo	Curitiba
16:00			Guerrero 52'; Cirino 89'	Stadium: Estádio Couto Pereira; Attendance: 16,177; Referee: Ricardo Marques Ribeiro

3 August 2016 18	Santos	0–0	Flamengo	Cuiabá
21:45				Stadium: Arena Pantanal; Attendance: 21,814; Referee: Dewson Freitas

6 August 2016 19	Flamengo	1–0	Atlético Paranaense	Cariacica
18:30	Mancuello 61'			Stadium: Estádio Kléber Andrade; Attendance: 19,036; Referee: Emerson de Almeida Ferreira

13 August 2016 20	Sport	1–0	Flamengo	Recife
21:00	Edmílson 24'			Stadium: Itaipava Arena Pernambuco; Attendance: 25,019; Referee: Rodolpho Toski Marques

21 August 2016 21	Flamengo	2–1	Grêmio	Brasília
11:00	Leandro Damião 30' (pen.); Diego 70'		Almeida 72'	Stadium: Estádio Nacional; Attendance: 22,552; Referee: Raphael Claus

28 August 2016 22	Chapecoense	1–3	Flamengo	Chapecó
16:00	Kempes 42'		Diego 9'; Leandro Damião 71' (pen.); Mancuello 90+1'	Stadium: Arena Condá; Attendance: 11,562; Referee: Caio Max Augusto Vieira

7 September 2016 23	Flamengo	2–1	Ponte Preta	Cariacica
21:45	Gabriel 14'; Fernandinho 90'		Pottker 67'	Stadium: Estádio Kléber Andrade; Attendance: 16,358; Referee: Francisco Carlos do Nascimento

10 September 2016 24	Vitória	1–2	Flamengo	Salvador
18:30	Zé Love 22'; Diego Renan (yellow card) 57' (yellow card) 73' (red card)		Fernandinho 44'; Gabriel 60'	Stadium: Barradão; Referee: Vinicius Furlan

14 September 2016 25	Palmeiras	1–1	Flamengo	São Paulo
21:45	Jesus 82'		Alan Patrick 63'; Araújo (yellow card) 16' (yellow card) 40' (red card)	Stadium: Allianz Parque; Attendance: 32,885; Referee: André Luiz de Freitas Castro

18 September 2016 26	Flamengo	2–0	Figueirense	São Paulo
11:00	Arão 37'; Diego 71' (pen.)			Stadium: Estádio do Pacaembu; Attendance: 29,605; Referee: Luiz Flávio de Oliveira

25 September 2016 27	Flamengo	2–1	Cruzeiro	Cariacica
16:00	Guerrero 84'; Mancuello 89'		Rafinha 74'	Stadium: Estádio Kléber Andrade; Attendance: 15,680; Referee: Leandro Pedro Vuaden

1 October 2016 28	São Paulo	0–0	Flamengo	São Paulo
16:30				Stadium: Estádio do Morumbi; Attendance: 29,813; Referee: Sandro Meira Ricci

9 October 2016 29	Flamengo	3–0	Santa Cruz	São Paulo
17:00	Vizeu 6'; Arão 57'; Cirino 87'		Vieira (yellow card) 43' (yellow card) 90' (red card)	Stadium: Estádio do Pacaembu; Attendance: 23,427; Referee: Ricardo Marques Ribeiro

13 October 2016 30	Fluminense	1–2	Flamengo	Volta Redonda
21:00	Marcos Júnior 47'		William Matheus 12' (o.g.); Fernandinho 54'	Stadium: Estádio Raulino de Oliveira; Attendance: 11,166; Referee: Sandro Meira Ricci

16 October 2016 31	Internacional	2–1	Flamengo	Porto Alegre
17:00	Sasha 66'; Vitinho 82'		Réver 57'	Stadium: Estádio Beira-Rio; Referee: Wilton Pereira Sampaio

23 October 2016 32	Flamengo	2–2	Corinthians	Rio de Janeiro
17:00	Guerrero 15', 59'		Guilherme 6' (yellow card) 14' (yellow card) 76' (red card); Rodriguinho 45+1'	Stadium: Estádio do Maracanã; Attendance: 65,743; Referee: Anderson Daronco

29 October 2016 33	Atlético Mineiro	2–2	Flamengo	Belo Horizonte
16:30	Robinho 82' (pen.); Pratto 87'		Diego 33'; Guerrero 90'	Stadium: Estádio Mineirão; Attendance: 48,157; Referee: Braulio da Silva Machado

6 November 2016 34	Flamengo	0–0	Botafogo	Rio de Janeiro
17:00				Stadium: Estádio do Maracanã; Attendance: 49,382; Referee: Jean Pierre Lima

16 November 2016 35	América (MG)	0–1	Flamengo	Belo Horizonte
21:45			Éverton 33'	Stadium: Mineirão; Referee: Raphael Claus

20 November 2016 36	Flamengo	2–2	Coritiba	Rio de Janeiro
19:30	Gabriel 2'; Diego 29'		Amaral 43'; Kléber 88'	Stadium: Estádio do Maracanã; Attendance: 40,802; Referee: Ricardo Marques Ribeiro

27 November 2016 37	Flamengo	2–0	Santos	Rio de Janeiro
17:00	Guerrero 5'; Diego 87'			Stadium: Estádio do Maracanã; Attendance: 37,615; Referee: Eduardo Tomaz de Aquino Valadão

12 December 2016 38	Atlético Paranaense	0–0	Flamengo	Curitiba
17:00			Mancuello (yellow card) 82' (yellow card) 86' (red card)	Stadium: Arena da Baixada; Attendance: 38,020; Referee: Elmo Alves Resende Cunha

=== Primeira Liga ===
The 2016 Primeira Liga is the first edition of this competition. Featuring 12 of 14 founding members, Minas Gerais and Santa Catarina leagues provided three entrants, while Rio de Janeiro, Rio Grande do Sul and Paraná provide two each.

==== Group stage ====
Pos	Team	Pld	W	D	L	GF	GA	GD	Pts	Qualification
1	Flamengo	3	2	1	0	4	1	+3	7	Knockout stage
2	Figueirense	3	1	1	1	3	3	0	4	
3	América Mineiro	3	1	1	1	2	2	0	4	
4	Atlético Mineiro	3	0	1	2	2	5	−3	1	

Source: Primeira Liga – Tabela
Rules for classification: 1) points; 2) goal difference; 3) goals scored; 4) away goals scored; 5) drawing of lots.

Semi-finals
23 March – Estádio Nacional
Fluminense (pen.)	2 (3)
Internacional	2 (2)
23 March – Estádio Helenão
Flamengo	0
Atlético Paranaense	1

Final
20 April – Estádio Helenão
Fluminense	1
Atlético Paranaense	0

==== Matches ====
27 January 2016 1	Atlético Mineiro	0–2	Flamengo	Belo Horizonte
		Report	Guerrero 67', 87'	Stadium: Estadio Mineirão; Attendance: 30,378; Referee: Héber Roberto Lopes

17 February 2016 2	Flamengo	1–0	América (MG)	Cariacica
	Éverton 47' (pen.)	Report		Stadium: Estádio Kléber Andrade; Attendance: 17,167; Referee: Bráulio da Silva Machado

9 March 2016 3	Flamengo	1–1	Figueirense	Brasília
	Guerrero 33'	Report	Éverton Santos 29'	Stadium: Estádio Nacional; Attendance: 7,219; Referee: Wanderson Alves de Souza

=== Semifinal ===
23 March 2016	Flamengo	0–1	Atlético Paranaense	Juiz de Fora
		Report	Marcos Guilherme 61'	Stadium: Estádio Helenão; Attendance: 12,917; Referee: Leandro Pedro Vuaden

==== Average attendances ====
Includes all matches in the 2016 Primeira Liga.

Stadium	Matches	Attendance
Estádio Kléber Andrade	1	17,167
Estádio Nacional	1	7,219
Estádio Mário Helênio	1	12,917
Total	3	37,067

=== Copa Sudamericana ===
As 12th place in the 2015 Série A, and being one of the best teams eliminated before 2016 Copa do Brasil round of 16, Flamengo will enter the Copa Sudamericana in the second stage. The draw has been made on 12 July 2016 with the first stage taking place on 9 August 2016.

==== Second stage ====
24 August 2016 First leg	Figueirense (Brazil)	4–2	(Brazil) Flamengo	Florianópolis
21:45	Moura 10', 27', 48'; Marquinhos 18'		Alan Patrick 13'; Cirino 75'	Stadium: Estádio Orlando Scarpelli; Attendance: 5.428; Referee: Daniel Fedorczuk

31 August 2016 Second leg	Flamengo (Brazil)	3–1 (5a–5 agg.)	(Brazil) Figueirense	Cariacica
21:45	Éverton 14'; Jorge 25'; Fernandinho 71'	Report	Silva 5'; Silva (yellow card) 6' (yellow card) 29' (red card)	Stadium: Estádio Kléber Andrade; Referee: Wilson Lamouroux

=== Round of 16 ===
21 September 2016 First leg	Palestino (Chile)	0–1	(Brazil) Flamengo	Santiago
21:45		Report	Emerson 78'	Stadium: Estadio Monumental David Arellano; Referee: Jonhatan Fuentes

28 September 2016 Second leg	Flamengo (Brazil)	1–2 (2–a2 agg.)	(Chile) Palestino	Cariacica
21:45	Alan Patrick 67' (pen.)	report	Cereceda 31'; Valencia 45'	Stadium: Estádio Kléber Andrade; Attendance: 12,626; Referee: Diego Haro

== Honors ==
=== Individuals ===
Name	Number	Country	Award
Rodinei	2	(Brazil)	2016 Campeonato Carioca Best eleven
Willian Arão	5	(Brazil)	2016 Campeonato Carioca Best eleven 2016 Campeonato Brasileiro Série A Bola de Prata
Jorge	6	(Brazil)	2016 Campeonato Brasileiro Série A Best eleven
Paolo Guerrero	9	(Peru)	2016 Primeira Liga Top scorer
Réver	15	(Brazil)	2016 Campeonato Brasileiro Série A Bola de Prata
Diego	35	(Brazil)	2016 Campeonato Brasileiro Série A Best eleven

== Club ranking ==
Flamengo position on the Club World Ranking during the 2016 season, according to clubworldranking.com.

Month	Position	Movement
January	99	–
February	104	(substituted off) 5
March	103	(substituted on) 1
April	104	(substituted off) 1
May	90	(substituted on) 14
June	78	(substituted on) 12
July	79	(substituted off) 1
August	79	–
September	59	(substituted on) 20
October	47	(substituted on) 12
November	42	(substituted on) 5
December	40	(substituted on) 2

Last updated: 2017-01-09.
Source: IFFHS
