= 2016 Campeonato Brasileiro Série A =

Campeonato Brasileiro Série A
- Season: 2016
- Champions: Palmeiras (9th title)
- Relegated: América Mineiro; Santa Cruz; Figueirense; Internacional
- Matches: 379
- Goals: 912 (2.41 per match)
- Top goalscorer: Fred; Diego Souza; William Pottker (14 goals)
- Best goalkeeper: Marcelo Grohe (15 clean sheets)
- Biggest home win: São Paulo 5–0 Santa Cruz (R38, 11 December)
- Biggest away win: Ponte Preta 0–4 Cruzeiro (R10, 22 June)
- Highest scoring: Sport 4–4 Atlético Mineiro (R6, 5 June); Atlético Mineiro 5–3 Botafogo (R12, 30 June); Sport 5–3 Santa Cruz (R24, 11 September)
- Longest winning run: 5 matches Atlético Mineiro; Botafogo
- Longest unbeaten run: 15 matches Palmeiras
- Longest winless run: 14 matches Internacional
- Longest losing run: 7 matches América Mineiro; Santa Cruz
- Highest attendance: 54,996; São Paulo 2–2 Chapecoense (R17, 31 July)
- Lowest attendance: 796; América Mineiro 2–1 Coritiba (R9, 18 June)
- Total attendance: 5,963,946
- Average attendance: 15,736
- All statistics correct as of 04:38, 29 December 2016 (UTC).

The 2016 Campeonato Brasileiro Série A was the 60th season of the Série A, the top level of professional football in Brazil, and the 14th edition in a double round-robin since its establishment in 2003. The season began on 15 May 2016 and ended on 11 December 2016. Fixtures for the 2016 season were announced on 25 April 2016. Palmeiras won the title, their ninth overall.

== Format and results ==
For the fourteenth consecutive season, the tournament was played in a double round-robin system. The team with most points at the end of the season was declared champion. The bottom four teams were relegated and will play in the Campeonato Brasileiro Série B in the 2017 season.

Atlético Mineiro and Chapecoense did not play their last match due to the accident involving 71 deaths (including 19 Chapecoense players) on 28 November 2016. Due to a lack of squad depth, both teams decided to forfeit the game resulting in Chapecoense finishing 11th and Atlético Mineiro finishing 4th. Match officials declared a double W.O., as CBF refused to cancel the match.

=== International qualification ===
The Série A served as a qualifier to CONMEBOL's 2017 Copa Libertadores. The top-three teams in the standings qualified to the Second Stage of the competition, while from the fourth to sixth place in the standings qualified to the First Stage.

And this change also impacts on the Copa Sudamericana, whose vacancies are again to be distributed in the stockmarket enot more by Copa do Brasil.

=== Tiebreakers ===
In case of a tie on points between two or more clubs, tiebreakers are applied in the following order:

1. Number of wins;
2. Goal difference;
3. Goals for;
4. Head to Head;
5. Fewer red cards;
6. Fewest yellow cards;
7. Draw.

With respect to the fourth criterion (direct confrontation), it is considered the result of the combined game, or the result of 180 minutes. Staying tie, the tie will be made by the greatest number of goals scored in the opponent's field. The fourth criterion is not considered in the case of a tie between more than two clubs.

== Teams ==
Location of teams in 2016 Série A

Twenty teams competed in the league – the top sixteen teams from the previous season, as well as four teams promoted from the Série B.

Botafogo became the first club to be promoted after a 1–0 win against Luverdense on 10 November 2015 meant they were guaranteed an automatic place. They returned to the League after only a season's absence. Vitória became the second club to be promoted, after a 3-0 win with Luverdense. They returned to the League after only a season's absence. Santa Cruz became the third club to be promoted, after 3-0 win with Mogi Mirim. They played the Brasileirão for the first time since the 2006 season. América Mineiro became the fourth and final club to be promoted, following a 1–1 draw over Ceará meant they finished above them on points difference and secured the automatic spot.

The four promoted clubs replaced Avaí, Vasco da Gama, Goiás and Joinville. At the end of the season, for the third consecutive year, Rio de Janeiro did not have its four representatives in the first division, largely due to the inconsistent performance of Vasco da Gama and Botafogo, who alternated in relegation in recent seasons.

Pos.	Relegated from 2015 Série A
17th	Avaí
18th	Vasco da Gama
19th	Goiás
20th	Joinville

Pos.	Promoted from 2015 Série B
1st	Botafogo
2nd	Santa Cruz
3rd	Vitória
4th	América Mineiro

=== Stadia and locations ===
The three clubs based in Rio de Janeiro, Botafogo, Flamengo and Fluminense weren't able to play their home matches in Maracanã or Engenhão Stadiums due to the preparation of these venues for the Olympic Games that were held in the city in August. The clubs used other stadiums for their home matches. Other stadiums used include Arena das Dunas, Arena Fonte Nova, Arena Pernambuco, Kléber Andrade, Mané Garrincha, Mário Helênio, Pacaembu, and Raulino de Oliveira.

Team	Location	State	Stadium	Capacity
América Mineiro	Belo Horizonte	Minas Gerais	Independência; Mineirão (one match); Estádio do Café (one match)	23,018; 61,846; 30,000
Atlético Mineiro	Belo Horizonte	Minas Gerais	Independência; Mineirão (4 matches)	23,018; 61,846
Atlético Paranaense	Curitiba	Paraná	Arena da Baixada; Vila Capanema (one match)	42,372; 17,140
Botafogo	Rio de Janeiro	Rio de Janeiro	Luso-Brasileiro; Mário Helênio (4 matches); Raulino de Oliveira (3 matches); Mané Garrincha (one match)	17,250; 31,863; 18,230; 72,788
Chapecoense	Chapecó	Santa Catarina	Arena Condá	20,089
Corinthians	São Paulo	São Paulo	Arena Corinthians; Pacaembu (one match)	47,605; 37,730
Coritiba	Curitiba	Paraná	Couto Pereira; Vila Capanema (one match)	40,502; 17,140
Cruzeiro	Belo Horizonte	Minas Gerais	Mineirão; Independência (one match)	61,846; 23,018
Figueirense	Florianópolis	Santa Catarina	Orlando Scarpelli	19,584
Flamengo	Rio de Janeiro	Rio de Janeiro	Kléber Andrade (5 matches); Maracanã (4 matches); Mané Garrincha (4 matches); Raulino de Oliveira (3 matches); Pacaembu (2 matches); Arena das Dunas (one match)	21,252; 78,838; 72,788; 18,230; 37,730; 31,375
Fluminense	Rio de Janeiro	Rio de Janeiro	Giulite Coutinho (8 matches); Raulino de Oliveira (5 matches); Maracanã (2 matches); Mané Garrincha (2 matches); Kléber Andrade (2 matches)	13,544; 18,230; 78,838; 72,788; 21,252
Grêmio	Porto Alegre	Rio Grande do Sul	Arena do Grêmio	55,662
Internacional	Porto Alegre	Rio Grande do Sul	Beira-Rio	50,128
Palmeiras	São Paulo	São Paulo	Allianz Parque; Pacaembu (one match); Fonte Luminosa (one match)	43,713; 37,730; 21,441
Ponte Preta	Campinas	São Paulo	Moisés Lucarelli	19,728
Santa Cruz	Recife	Pernambuco	Arruda; Arena Pernambuco (one match); Arena Pantanal (one match)	60,044; 44,300; 44,097
Santos	Santos	São Paulo	Vila Belmiro; Pacaembu (3 matches); Arena Pantanal	16,068; 37,730; 44,097
São Paulo	São Paulo	São Paulo	Morumbi; Pacaembu (2 matches)	67,052; 37,730
Sport Recife	Recife	Pernambuco	Ilha do Retiro; Arena Pernambuco (2 matches)	32,983; 44,300
Vitória	Salvador	Bahia	Barradão; Arena Fonte Nova (3 matches); Joia da Princesa (one match)	34,535; 47,907; 16,274

=== Number of teams by state ===
Number of teams	State	Team(s)
5	São Paulo	Corinthians, Palmeiras, Ponte Preta, Santos, São Paulo
3	Minas Gerais	América Mineiro, Atlético Mineiro, Cruzeiro
3	Rio de Janeiro	Botafogo, Flamengo, Fluminense
2	Paraná	Atlético Paranaense, Coritiba
2	Pernambuco	Santa Cruz, Sport Recife
2	Rio Grande do Sul	Grêmio, Internacional
2	Santa Catarina	Chapecoense, Figueirense
1	Bahia	Vitória

=== Personnel and kits ===
Team	Manager	Captain	Kit manufacturer	Shirt main sponsor
América Mineiro	(Brazil) Enderson Moreira	(Brazil) Leandro Guerreiro	Lupo	Banco Intermedium
Atlético Mineiro	(Brazil) Diogo Giacomini (interim)	(Brazil) Leonardo Silva	Dryworld	Caixa
Atlético Paranaense	(Brazil) Paulo Autuori	(Brazil) Wéverton	Umbro	Caixa
Botafogo	(Brazil) Jair Ventura	(Brazil) Jefferson	Topper	Caixa
Chapecoense	(Brazil) Caio Júnior	(Brazil) Cléber Santana	Umbro	Caixa
Corinthians	(Brazil) Oswaldo de Oliveira	(Brazil) Fagner	Nike	Caixa
Coritiba	(Brazil) Paulo César Carpegiani	(Brazil) Kléber	Adidas	Caixa
Cruzeiro	(Brazil) Mano Menezes	(Brazil) Fábio	Umbro	Caixa
Figueirense	(Brazil) Marquinhos Santos	(Brazil) Rafael Moura	Lupo	Caixa
Flamengo	(Brazil) Zé Ricardo	(Brazil) Réver	Adidas	Caixa
Fluminense	(Brazil) Marcão	(Brazil) Gum	Dryworld	None
Grêmio	(Brazil) Renato Gaúcho	(Brazil) Maicon	Umbro	Banrisul
Internacional	(Brazil) Lisca	(Brazil) Paulão	Nike	Banrisul
Palmeiras	(Brazil) Cuca	(Brazil) Fernando Prass	Adidas	Crefisa
Ponte Preta	(Brazil) Eduardo Baptista	(Brazil) Wellington Paulista	Adidas	Viva Schin
Santa Cruz	(Brazil) Adriano Teixeira (interim)	(Brazil) Tiago Cardoso	Penalty	MRV
Santos	(Brazil) Dorival Júnior	(Brazil) Ricardo Oliveira	Kappa	Caixa
São Paulo	(Brazil) Ricardo Gomes	(Brazil) Maicon	Under Armour	Prevent Senior
Sport	(Brazil) Daniel Paulista	(Brazil) Durval	Adidas	Caixa
Vitória	(Brazil) Argel Fucks	(Brazil) Fernando Miguel	Puma	Caixa

=== Managerial changes ===
Team	Outgoing manager	Manner of departure	Date of vacancy	Position in table	Incoming manager	Date of appointment
Atlético Mineiro	(Uruguay) Diego Aguirre	Resigned	19 May	3rd	(Brazil) Marcelo Oliveira	20 May
Flamengo	(Brazil) Muricy Ramalho	Resigned	26 May	11th	(Brazil) Zé Ricardo	26 May (interim) 14 July
Coritiba	(Brazil) Gilson Kleina	Sacked	2 June	16th	(Brazil) Pachequinho	2 June
América Mineiro	(Brazil) Givanildo Oliveira	Sacked	3 June	20th	(Portugal) Sérgio Vieira	4 June
Corinthians	(Brazil) Tite	Signed by Brazil	15 June	4th	(Brazil) Cristóvão Borges	19 June
Chapecoense	(Brazil) Guto Ferreira	Signed by Bahia	24 June	8th	(Brazil) Caio Júnior	25 June
Internacional	(Brazil) Argel Fucks	Sacked	10 July	8th	(Brazil) Falcão	12 July
Figueirense	(Brazil) Vinícius Eutrópio	Sacked	11 July	17th	(Brazil) Argel Fucks	11 July
América Mineiro	(Portugal) Sérgio Vieira	Sacked	17 July	20th	(Brazil) Enderson Moreira	20 July
Cruzeiro	(Portugal) Paulo Bento	Sacked	25 July	19th	(Brazil) Mano Menezes	26 July
São Paulo	(Argentina) Edgardo Bauza	Signed by Argentina	1 August	10th	(Brazil) Ricardo Gomes	12 August
Coritiba	(Brazil) Pachequinho	Mutual consent	5 August	17th	(Brazil) Paulo César Carpegiani	5 August
Internacional	(Brazil) Falcão	Sacked	8 August	13th	(Brazil) Celso Roth	8 August
Santa Cruz	(Brazil) Milton Mendes	Resigned	9 August	19th	(Brazil) Doriva	12 August
Botafogo	(Brazil) Ricardo Gomes	Signed by São Paulo	12 August	17th	(Brazil) Jair Ventura	13 August
Figueirense	(Brazil) Argel Fucks	Sacked	22 August	18th	(Brazil) Tuca Guimarães	5 September
Vitória	(Brazil) Vágner Mancini	Sacked	10 September	18th	(Brazil) Argel Fucks	12 September
Grêmio	(Brazil) Roger Machado	Resigned	14 September	8th	(Brazil) Renato Gaúcho	18 September
Corinthians	(Brazil) Cristóvão Borges	Sacked	17 September	6th	(Brazil) Fábio Carille	17 September
Figueirense	(Brazil) Tuca Guimarães	Mutual consent	19 September	17th	(Brazil) Marquinhos Santos	19 September
Corinthians	(Brazil) Fábio Carille	Mutual consent	12 October	8th	(Brazil) Oswaldo de Oliveira	12 October
Sport	(Brazil) Oswaldo de Oliveira	Signed by Corinthians	12 October	16th	(Brazil) Daniel Paulista	13 October
Santa Cruz	(Brazil) Doriva	Resigned	20 October	19th	(Brazil) Adriano Teixeira	20 October
Fluminense	(Brazil) Levir Culpi	Sacked	6 November	9th	(Brazil) Marcão	6 November
Internacional	(Brazil) Celso Roth	Sacked	17 November	17th	(Brazil) Lisca	18 November
São Paulo	(Brazil) Ricardo Gomes	Sacked	23 November	13th	(Brazil) Pintado	23 November
Atlético Mineiro	(Brazil) Marcelo Oliveira	Sacked	24 November	4th	(Brazil) Diogo Giacomini	24 November
Chapecoense	(Brazil) Caio Júnior	Fatal airplane accident	29 November	9th	(Brazil) Vagner Mancini	9 December

=== Foreign players ===
The clubs can have a maximum of five foreign players in their Campeonato Brasileiro squads.

Club	Player 1	Player 2	Player 3	Player 4	Player 5	Double Nationality Players
América Mineiro	(Colombia) Eisner Loboa					
Atlético Mineiro	(Argentina) Jesús Dátolo	(Argentina) Lucas Pratto	(Ecuador) Frickson Erazo	(Ecuador) Juan Cazares	(Venezuela) Rómulo Otero	
Atlético Paranaense	(Portugal) Bruno Pereirinha	(Colombia) Oscar Cabezas	(Chile) Luciano Cabral	(Argentina) Lucho González		
Botafogo	(Argentina) Joel Carli	(Bolivia) Damián Lizio	(Argentina) Gervasio Núñez	(Uruguay) Juan Manuel Salgueiro	(Chile) Gustavo Canales	
Chapecoense	(Argentina) Alejandro Martinuccio					
Corinthians	(Paraguay) Ángel Romero	(Paraguay) Fabián Balbuena				
Coritiba	(Paraguay) César Benítez	(Paraguay) Jorge Ortega	(Venezuela) César González	(Turkey) Colin Kazim-Richards	(Paraguay) Nery Bareiro	(Portugal) Fábio Braga^{1}
Cruzeiro	(Uruguay) Giorgian De Arrascaeta	(Argentina) Ariel Cabral	(Argentina) Lucas Romero	(Argentina) Ramón Ábila		(Uruguay) Federico Gino^{1}
Figueirense	(Paraguay) Roberto Junior Fernández	(Colombia) Michael Ortega				
Flamengo	(Peru) Paolo Guerrero	(Argentina) Federico Mancuello	(Colombia) Gustavo Cuéllar	(Argentina) Alejandro Donatti	(Argentina) Lucas Mugni	(Qatar) Emerson^{1}
Fluminense	(Paraguay) Alexis Rojas	(Argentina) Claudio Aquino				
Grêmio	(Ecuador) Miller Bolaños	(Argentina) Walter Kannemann				
Internacional	(Uruguay) Nico López	(Venezuela) Luis Seijas	(Argentina) Ariel Nahuelpán	(Uruguay) Yonatthan Rak		
Palmeiras	(Paraguay) Lucas Barrios	(Argentina) Agustín Allione	(Colombia) Yerry Mina			
Ponte Preta						
Santa Cruz	(Argentina) Matías Pisano					
Santos	(Colombia) Edwin Valencia	(Cameroon) Diederrick Joel	(Colombia) Jonathan Copete	(Argentina) Emiliano Vecchio	(Argentina) Fabián Noguera	
São Paulo	(Uruguay) Diego Lugano	(Chile) Eugenio Mena	(Peru) Christian Cueva	(Argentina) Andrés Chávez	(Argentina) Julio Buffarini	
Sport	(Colombia) Oswaldo Henríquez	(Colombia) Reinaldo Lenis	(Costa Rica) Rodney Wallace	(Colombia) Luis Carlos Ruiz		
Vitória	(Bolivia) Rodrigo Ramallo	(Colombia) Sherman Cárdenas				

- ^{1} Players holding Brazilian dual nationality.

== Standings ==
=== League table ===
Pos	Team	Pld	W	D	L	GF	GA	GD	Pts	Qualification or relegation
1	Palmeiras (C)	38	24	8	6	62	32	+30	80	Qualification for 2017 Copa Libertadores group stage
2	Santos	38	22	5	11	59	35	+24	71	Qualification for 2017 Copa Libertadores group stage
3	Flamengo	38	20	11	7	52	35	+17	71	Qualification for 2017 Copa Libertadores group stage
4	Atlético Mineiro	38	17	11	10	61	53	+8	62 (Note: The matchday 38 game between Chapecoense and Atlético Mineiro was cancelled after both teams declined to play following the Chapecoense team plane crash. Both teams received a double walkover (3–0 loss for each team).)	Qualification for 2017 Copa Libertadores group stage
5	Botafogo	38	17	8	13	43	39	+4	59	Qualification for 2017 Copa Libertadores first stage
6	Atlético Paranaense	38	17	6	15	38	32	+6	57	Qualification for 2017 Copa Libertadores first stage
7	Corinthians	38	15	10	13	48	42	+6	55	Qualification for 2017 Copa Sudamericana
8	Ponte Preta	38	15	8	15	48	52	−4	53	Qualification for 2017 Copa Sudamericana
9	Grêmio	38	14	11	13	41	44	−3	53	Qualification for 2017 Copa Libertadores group stage
10	São Paulo	38	14	10	14	44	36	+8	52	Qualification for 2017 Copa Sudamericana
11	Chapecoense	38	13	13	12	49	56	−7	52	Qualification for 2017 Copa Libertadores group stage
12	Cruzeiro	38	14	9	15	48	49	−1	51	Qualification for 2017 Copa Sudamericana
13	Fluminense	38	13	11	14	45	45	0	50	Qualification for 2017 Copa Sudamericana
14	Sport	38	13	8	17	49	55	−6	47	Qualification for 2017 Copa Sudamericana
15	Coritiba	38	11	13	14	41	42	−1	46	
16	Vitória	38	12	9	17	51	53	−2	45	
17	Internacional (R)	38	11	10	17	35	41	−6	43	Relegation to 2017 Campeonato Brasileiro Série B
18	Figueirense (R)	38	8	13	17	30	50	−20	37	Relegation to 2017 Campeonato Brasileiro Série B
19	Santa Cruz (R)	38	8	7	23	45	69	−24	31	Relegation to 2017 Campeonato Brasileiro Série B
20	América Mineiro (R)	38	7	7	24	23	58	−35	28	Relegation to 2017 Campeonato Brasileiro Série B

Source: CBF
Rules for classification: 1) points; 2) wins; 3) goal difference; 4) goals scored; 5) head-to-head results; 6) least red cards received; 7) least yellow cards received; 8) draw.
(C) Champions; (R) Relegated

=== Positions by round ===
Team ╲ Round	1	2	3	4	5	6	7	8	9	10	11	12	13	14	15	16	17	18	19	20	21	22	23	24	25	26	27	28	29	30	31	32	33	34	35	36	37	38
América Mineiro	14	20	18	18	20	17	19	20	19	20	20	20	20	20	20	20	20	20	20	20	20	20	20	20	20	20	20	20	20	20	20	19	19	20	20	20	20	20
Atlético Mineiro	3	4	14	11	12	12	16	18	14	11	8	7	6	10	7	7	6	5	2	4	2	3	3	3	3	3	3	3	3	3	3	3	4	4	4	4	4	4
Atlético Paranaense	20	19	20	16	19	14	11	12	10	9	7	10	7	7	5	5	7	7	7	8	9	9	9	9	10	7	6	6	6	9	7	7	6	6	6	5	5	6
Botafogo	15	17	8	13	16	20	20	16	18	19	17	18	16	14	15	18	14	16	13	13	11	11	10	10	11	9	10	8	7	5	5	5	5	5	5	6	6	5
Chapecoense	8	2	5	9	6	5	6	11	5	7	10	8	11	13	13	10	11	10	11	10	10	10	11	11	9	10	11	11	11	11	11	12	11	10	10	9	9	11
Corinthians	9	15	6	4	3	1	4	5	4	6	4	2	2	2	2	2	1	3	3	5	3	4	4	4	5	5	7	7	9	8	6	6	7	7	7	7	7	7
Coritiba	4	9	9	14	17	19	17	15	16	17	19	16	17	15	18	15	17	18	16	16	14	15	12	12	13	13	13	12	12	12	14	14	15	15	14	14	14	15
Cruzeiro	16	16	19	19	14	18	15	17	20	16	13	14	14	16	19	19	19	19	18	18	17	16	13	13	16	15	17	16	14	13	13	13	13	13	11	12	13	12
Figueirense	10	14	16	17	11	15	12	13	12	10	12	15	15	17	16	17	15	15	17	17	18	18	17	17	17	17	16	17	18	18	18	18	18	18	18	18	18	18
Flamengo	5	12	10	5	4	6	7	7	7	4	6	5	8	6	6	6	5	6	4	6	4	2	2	2	2	2	2	2	2	2	2	2	2	3	3	3	2	3
Fluminense	6	3	12	7	8	8	8	8	9	12	9	12	12	11	10	12	8	8	8	7	7	7	7	7	7	6	5	5	5	6	9	9	9	9	9	11	12	13
Grêmio	11	7	2	2	2	2	3	3	3	3	5	3	3	3	3	3	4	4	6	3	6	6	6	6	8	11	8	9	8	7	8	8	8	8	8	8	8	9
Internacional	12	5	3	1	1	3	1	1	2	2	2	4	5	9	11	11	13	14	14	15	15	17	15	15	18	18	18	18	17	17	16	15	16	17	17	17	17	17
Palmeiras	1	8	4	4	5	4	2	2	1	1	1	1	1	1	1	1	3	2	1	1	1	1	1	1	1	1	1	1	1	1	1	1	1	1	1	1	1	1
Ponte Preta	13	6	15	15	10	13	10	9	11	13	14	11	9	7	8	8	9	9	9	9	8	8	8	8	6	8	9	10	10	10	10	10	10	12	12	10	10	8
Santa Cruz	2	1	1	3	7	9	14	10	13	15	18	19	19	18	14	16	18	17	19	19	19	19	19	19	19	19	19	19	19	19	19	20	20	19	19	19	19	19
Santos	17	10	7	12	15	11	5	4	8	5	3	6	4	4	4	4	2	1	5	2	5	5	5	5	4	4	4	4	4	4	4	4	3	2	2	2	3	2
São Paulo	7	11	11	6	9	7	9	6	6	8	11	9	10	8	9	9	10	11	10	12	12	12	14	14	12	12	12	14	13	14	12	11	12	11	13	13	11	10
Sport	18	18	17	20	18	16	18	19	17	18	16	17	18	19	17	14	12	12	12	11	13	13	16	16	14	14	14	15	16	16	15	16	14	14	15	15	16	14
Vitória	19	13	13	10	13	10	13	14	15	14	15	13	13	12	12	13	16	13	15	14	16	14	18	18	15	16	15	13	15	15	17	17	17	16	16	16	15	16

Source: globoesporte.com

=== Result table ===
Home \ Away	AME	CAM	CAP	BOT	CHA	COR	CTB	CRU	FIG	FLA	FLU	GRE	INT	PAL	PON	SCR	SAN	SPA	SPT	VIT
América Mineiro		0–1	1–0	1–0	1–2	0–2	2–1	0–2	1–0	0–1	0–1	0–0	1–0	0–2	1–2	0–3	1–0	1–0	2–2	1–1
Atlético Mineiro	3–0		1–0	5–3	3–1	2–1	2–1	2–3	3–0	2–2	1–1	0–3	3–1	1–1	3–0	3–0	1–0	1–2	1–0	2–1
Atlético Paranaense	1–0	1–1		1–0	3–1	2–0	2–0	1–0	2–1	0–0	1–0	2–0	2–1	0–1	3–0	1–0	1–0	1–0	2–0	1–1
Botafogo	3–1	3–2	2–1		0–2	2–0	0–0	0–1	0–0	3–3	1–0	2–1	1–0	3–1	1–1	2–1	0–1	0–1	3–0	1–1
Chapecoense	3–1	C (Note: The Chapecoense vs Atletico Mineiro game in Matchday 38 was cancelled by mutual agreement in the wake of the plane crash involving the Chapecoense team)	0–0	2–1		0–2	1–0	3–2	1–0	1–3	0–0	3–3	1–0	1–1	2–2	1–1	0–1	2–0	3–0	1–4
Corinthians	2–0	0–0	0–0	3–1	1–1		2–1	1–1	1–1	4–0	0–1	0–0	1–0	0–2	3–0	2–1	1–0	1–1	3–0	2–1
Coritiba	3–0	2–0	1–0	0–0	3–4	1–1		1–0	0–0	0–2	1–1	4–0	1–1	2–2	3–1	1–0	2–1	1–1	3–2	0–1
Cruzeiro	1–1	1–1	0–3	0–2	0–0	3–2	2–2		2–2	0–1	4–2	1–0	4–2	2–1	2–0	2–0	2–2	0–1	1–2	2–2
Figueirense	2–2	1–1	1–0	0–1	1–1	1–1	0–0	1–2		1–0	1–0	0–0	3–2	1–2	0–0	3–1	2–2	1–0	1–1	1–0
Flamengo	2–1	2–0	1–0	0–0	2–2	2–2	2–2	2–1	2–0		1–2	2–1	1–0	1–2	2–1	3–0	2–0	2–2	1–0	1–0
Fluminense	1–0	4–2	1–1	1–0	1–2	1–0	0–0	2–0	3–2	1–2		1–1	1–1	0–2	3–0	2–2	2–4	0–1	3–1	2–2
Grêmio	3–0	1–1	1–0	0–1	1–0	3–0	2–0	2–0	2–1	1–0	0–1		0–0	0–0	1–0	0–0	3–2	1–0	0–3	1–2
Internacional	3–1	2–0	1–0	2–3	0–0	0–1	1–0	1–0	1–0	2–1	2–2	0–1		0–1	1–1	1–1	2–1	1–1	1–0	0–1
Palmeiras	2–0	0–1	4–0	1–0	1–0	1–0	2–1	0–0	4–0	1–1	2–0	4–3	1–0		2–2	3–1	1–1	2–1	2–1	2–1
Ponte Preta	1–1	1–2	3–2	2–0	2–1	2–0	2–0	0–4	2–0	1–2	1–0	3–0	2–2	2–1		3–0	1–2	1–0	2–1	2–0
Santa Cruz	1–0	3–3	1–0	0–1	2–2	2–4	0–1	4–1	1–0	0–1	0–1	5–1	1–0	2–3	0–3		0–2	1–2	0–1	4–1
Santos	1–0	3–0	2–0	3–0	3–0	2–1	2–1	2–0	0–1	0–0	2–1	1–1	0–1	1–0	3–1	3–2		3–0	2–0	3–2
São Paulo	3–0	1–2	1–2	0–1	2–2	4–0	0–0	1–0	3–1	0–0	2–1	1–1	1–2	1–0	2–0	5–0	0–1		0–0	2–0
Sport	1–1	4–4	2–0	1–1	5–1	0–2	0–1	0–1	2–0	1–0	2–1	4–2	1–1	1–3	1–0	5–3	1–0	1–1		1–0
Vitória	2–1	1–1	3–2	0–1	1–2	3–2	3–1	0–1	4–0	1–2	0–0	0–1	1–0	1–2	1–1	2–2	2–3	2–0	3–2	

Updated to match(es) played on 11 December 2016. Source: Globo Esporte
Legend: Blue = home team win; Yellow = draw; Red = away team win.

== Season statistics ==
=== Top scorers ===
As of matches played on 11 December 2016

Rank	Player	Club	Goals
1	(Brazil) Diego Souza	Sport	14
1	(Brazil) Fred	Atlético Mineiro	14
1	(Brazil) William Pottker	Ponte Preta	14
2	(Brazil) Grafite	Santa Cruz	13
5	(Brazil) Robinho	Atlético Mineiro	12
5	(Brazil) Gabriel Jesus	Palmeiras	12
5	(Brazil) Sassá	Botafogo	12
5	(Brazil) Marinho	Vitória	12
9	(Brazil) Ricardo Oliveira	Santos	11
10	(Brazil) Vitor Bueno	Santos	10
10	(Brazil) Bruno Rangel	Chapecoense	10
10	(Colombia) Jonathan Copete	Santos	10
10	(Brazil) Keno	Santa Cruz	10

=== Assists ===
Total	Player	Club
10	(Brazil) Gustavo Scarpa	Fluminense
10	(Brazil) Dudu	Palmeiras
9	(Uruguay) Giorgian De Arrascaeta	Cruzeiro
8	(Brazil) Diego Renan	Vitória
8	(Brazil) Robinho	Atlético Mineiro
7	(Brazil) Éverton	Flamengo
7	(Brazil) Keno	Santa Cruz
6	(Brazil) Cleiton Xavier	Palmeiras
6	(Brazil) Juan	Coritiba
6	(Brazil) Robinho	Cruzeiro
6	(Brazil) Camilo	Botafogo
6	(Paraguay) Ángel Romero	Corinthians
6	(Brazil) Marinho	Vítoria
6	(Brazil) Pará	Flamengo
6	(Brazil) Diego Souza	Sport

=== Hat-tricks ===
Player	For	Against	Result	Date	Ref.
(Brazil) Bruno Rangel	Chapecoense	Coritiba	4–3	1 June	
(Brazil) Sassá	Botafogo	América-MG	3–1	15 June	
(Brazil) Rafael Sóbis	Cruzeiro	Internacional	4–2	4 August	

=== Clean sheets ===
Rank	Player	Club	Clean sheets
1	(Brazil) Marcelo Grohe	Grêmio	15

== Awards ==
=== Annual awards ===
Award	Winner	Club
Coach of the Year	(Brazil) Cuca	Palmeiras
Bola de Ouro (Golden Ball)	(Brazil) Gabriel Jesus	Palmeiras
Serie A Best Newcomer	(Brazil) Vitor Bueno	Santos FC
Craque do Campeonato (Player of the Year)	(Brazil) Gabriel Jesus	Palmeiras
Craque da Galera (Fan Player of the Year)	(Brazil) Danilo	Chapecoense
Gol Mais Bonito (Best Goal)	(Brazil) Zé Roberto	Palmeiras

Série A Team of the Year
Goalkeeper	(Brazil) Jailson (Palmeiras)			
Defence	(Brazil) Jean (Palmeiras)	(Brazil) Pedro Geromel (Grêmio)	(Colombia) Yerry Mina (Palmeiras)	(Brazil) Jorge (Flamengo)
Midfield	(Brazil) Tchê Tchê (Palmeiras)	(Brazil) Moisés (Palmeiras)	(Brazil) Diego (Flamengo)	
Attack	(Brazil) Dudu (Palmeiras)	(Brazil) Robinho (Atlético Mineiro)	(Brazil) Gabriel Jesus (Palmeiras)	

== Attendance ==
=== Average home attendances ===
Pos.	Team	GP	Total	High	Low	Average
1	Palmeiras	19	620,998	40,986	18,789	32,684
2	Corinthians	19	547,096	42,099	17,135	28,795
3	Internacional	19	500,494	40,686	10,314	26,342
4	Flamengo	19	466,291	54,665	2,252	24,542
5	São Paulo	19	428,739	54,996	7,836	22,565
6	Grêmio	19	401,902	50,184	10,765	21,153
7	Cruzeiro	19	398,973	49,208	7,735	20,999
8	Atlético Mineiro	19	371,480	48,157	4,889	19,552
9	Sport	19	305,321	26,719	5,218	16,070
10	Atlético Paranaense	19	301,888	35,396	6,684	15,889
11	Vitória	19	261,029	34,987	4,814	13,738
12	Santos	19	215,336	24,586	4,468	11,333
13	Coritiba	19	187,984	16,177	2,852	9,894
14	Santa Cruz	19	183,197	16,951	1,665	9,642
15	Fluminense	19	176,224	39,877	917	9,275
16	Chapecoense	18	137,015	13,154	2,057	7,612
17	Botafogo	19	140,260	15,288	883	7,382
18	Figueirense	19	134,874	16,467	1,910	7,099
19	Ponte Preta	19	107,985	10,912	3,086	5,683
20	América Mineiro	19	76,860	27,895	796	4,045
–	Total	379	5,963,946	54,996	796	15,736

Updated to games played on 11 December 2016.

Source: GloboEsporte.com
