= 2016 Primeira Liga =

- Official logo

Tournament details
- Country: Brazil
- Dates: 27 January – 20 April
- Teams: 12

Final positions
- Champions: Fluminense (1st title) (1st title)
- Runners-up: Atlético Paranaense

Tournament statistics
- Matches played: 21
- Goals scored: 44 (2.1 per match)
- Top goal scorer(s): (Brazil) Diego Souza (Peru) Paolo Guerrero (3 goals each)

Awards
- Best player: (Brazil) Gustavo Scarpa (Fluminense)

The 2016 Primeira Liga is the first edition of a football competition held in Brazil. Featuring 12 clubs, the Minas Gerais and Santa Catarina leagues provided three entrants, while the football leagues of Rio de Janeiro, Rio Grande do Sul and Paraná provided two each.

== Qualified teams ==
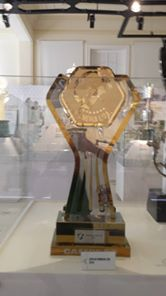
Primeira Liga 2016

Association	Team (Berth)
(Rio de Janeiro (state)) Rio de Janeiro; 2 berths	Flamengo
(Rio de Janeiro (state)) Rio de Janeiro; 2 berths	Fluminense
(Minas Gerais) Minas Gerais; 3 berths	América
(Minas Gerais) Minas Gerais; 3 berths	Atlético Mineiro
(Minas Gerais) Minas Gerais; 3 berths	Cruzeiro
(Rio Grande do Sul) Rio Grande do Sul; 2 berths	Grêmio
(Rio Grande do Sul) Rio Grande do Sul; 2 berths	Internacional
(Paraná (state)) Paraná; 2 berths	Coritiba
(Paraná (state)) Paraná; 2 berths	Atlético Paranaense
(Santa Catarina (state)) Santa Catarina; 3 berths	Avaí
(Santa Catarina (state)) Santa Catarina; 3 berths	Criciúma
(Santa Catarina (state)) Santa Catarina; 3 berths	Figueirense

== Group stage ==
=== Group A ===
Pos	Team	Pld	W	D	L	GF	GA	GD	Pts	Qualification
1	Fluminense	3	2	0	1	6	4	+2	6	Qualifies to the Final stage
2	Atlético Paranaense	3	2	0	1	3	2	+1	6	Qualifies to the Final stage
3	Cruzeiro	3	1	1	1	6	6	0	4	
4	Criciúma	3	0	1	2	1	4	−3	1	

27 January 2016
19:30

Criciúma	1–1	Cruzeiro
Diego Giaretta 23'	Report	Alisson 14'

Estádio Heriberto Hülse, Criciúma
Attendance: 7,040
Referee: Charles Martins Lemos
27 January 2016
19:30

Fluminense	0–1	Atlético Paranaense
	Report	Vinícius 70'

Estádio Raulino de Oliveira, Volta Redonda
Attendance: 6,005
Referee: Célio Amorim

17 February 2016
19:30

Cruzeiro	3–4	Fluminense
Rafael Silva 4', 43'; De Arrascaeta 65'	Report	Diego Souza 28' (pen.), 34', 70' (pen.); Scarpa 37'

Mineirão, Belo Horizonte
Attendance: 21,118
Referee: Francisco de Paula Neto
24 February 2016
19:30

Atlético Paranaense	1–0	Criciúma
Otávio 87'	Report

Arena da Baixada, Curitiba
Attendance: 33,270
Referee: Jeferson Antônio da Costa

10 March 2016
19:30

Cruzeiro	2–1	Atlético Paranaense
Douglas Coutinho 75'; Élber 79'	Report	Pablo 33'

Mineirão, Belo Horizonte
Attendance: 4,476
Referee: Leandro Pedro Vuaden
10 March 2016
21:45

Fluminense	2–0	Criciúma
Gerson 4', 33'	Report

Estádio Helenão, Juiz de Fora
Attendance: 1,406
Referee: Ronei Cândido Alves

=== Group B ===
Pos	Team	Pld	W	D	L	GF	GA	GD	Pts	Qualification
1	Internacional	3	1	2	0	3	0	+3	5	Qualifies to the Final stage
2	Grêmio	3	1	2	0	3	2	+1	5	
3	Coritiba	3	1	1	1	3	1	+2	4	
4	Avaí	3	0	1	2	2	8	−6	1	

27 January 2016
21:45

Internacional	0–0	Coritiba
	Report

Estádio Beira-Rio, Porto Alegre
Attendance: 13,092
Referee: Ronan Marques da Rosa
28 January 2016
21:45

Avaí	2–2	Grêmio
William 51'; Gabriel 87'	Report	Edinho 1'; Bressan 61'

Arena Condá, Chapecó
Attendance: 2,704
Referee: Erik Giovanni Fernandes

7 February 2016
19:30

Grêmio	1–0	Coritiba
Douglas 21'	Report

Arena do Grêmio, Porto Alegre
Attendance: 11,118
Referee: Héber Roberto Lopes
17 February 2016
19:30

Internacional	3–0	Avaí
Aylon 42'; Dourado 44'; Sasha 81'	Report

Estádio Beira-Rio, Porto Alegre
Attendance: 7,813
Referee: Ronei Candido Alves

6 March 2016
18:30

Grêmio	0–0	Internacional
	Report

Arena do Grêmio, Porto Alegre
Attendance: 48,204
Referee: Anderson Daronco
10 March 2016
21:45

Coritiba	3–0	Avaí
Leandro 33', 67' (pen.); Vinícius 41'	Report

Estádio Couto Pereira, Curitiba
Attendance: 1,982
Referee: William Machado Steffens

=== Group C ===
Pos	Team	Pld	W	D	L	GF	GA	GD	Pts	Qualification	FLA	FIG	AME	CAM
1	Flamengo	3	2	1	0	4	1	+3	7	Knockout stage	—	1–1	1−0	
2	Figueirense	3	1	1	1	3	3	0	4			—		2–1
3	América Mineiro	3	1	1	1	2	2	0	4			1–0	—	
4	Atlético Mineiro	3	0	1	2	2	5	−3	1		0−2		1–1	—

Source: Primeira Liga – Tabela
Rules for classification: 1) points; 2) goal difference; 3) goals scored; 4) away goals scored; 5) drawing of lots.
27 January 2016
21:45

Atlético Mineiro	0–2	Flamengo
	Report	Guerrero 67', 87'

Mineirão, Belo Horizonte
Attendance: 30,378
Referee: Héber Roberto Lopes
28 January 2016
19:30

América-MG	1–0	Figueirense
Sávio 13'	Report

Estádio Independência, Belo Horizonte
Attendance: 2,127
Referee: Arilson Bispo da Anunciação

6 February 2016
17:00

Figueirense	2–1	Atlético Mineiro
Dudu 13' (pen.); Gabriel Esteves 54'	Report	Eduardo 37'

Estádio Orlando Scarpelli, Florianópolis
Attendance: 3,062
Referee: Leandro Vuaden
17 February 2016
21:45

Flamengo	1–0	América-MG
Éverton 47'	Report

Estádio Kléber Andrade, Cariacica
Attendance: 17,167
Referee: Bráulio da Silva Machado

2 March 2016
19:30

Atlético Mineiro	1–1	América-MG
Dátolo 63'	Report	Rafael Bastos 65'

Mineirão, Belo Horizonte
Attendance: 6,403
Referee: Arilson Bispo da Anunciação
9 March 2016
19:30

Flamengo	1–1	Figueirense
Guerrero 33'	Report	Éverton Santos 29'

Estádio Nacional, Brasília
Attendance: 7,219
Referee: Wanderson Alves de Souza

=== Ranking of second placed teams ===
Pos	Team	Pld	W	D	L	GF	GA	GD	Pts	Qualification
1	Atlético Paranaense	3	2	0	1	3	2	+1	6	Qualifies to the Final stage
2	Grêmio	3	1	2	0	3	2	+1	5	
3	Figueirense	3	1	1	1	3	3	0	4	

== Knockout stage ==
Semi-finals
23 March – Estádio Nacional
Fluminense (pen.)	2 (3)
Internacional	2 (2)
23 March – Estádio Helenão
Flamengo	0
Atlético Paranaense	1

Final
20 April – Estádio Helenão
Fluminense	1
Atlético Paranaense	0

=== Semi-finals ===
23 March 2016
19:15

Fluminense	2–2	Internacional
Osvaldo 29', 60'	Report	Vitinho 24', 85'
Penalties
Scarpa (penalty scored); Cícero (penalty scored); Marcos Jr. (penalty scored); Felipe Amorim (penalty missed)	3–2	(penalty scored) Sasha; (penalty missed) Vitinho; (penalty scored) Marquinhos; (penalty missed) Jackson; (penalty missed) Anderson

Estádio Nacional, Brasília
Attendance: 4,624
Referee: Sandro Meira Ricci

23 March 2016
21:30

Flamengo	0–1	Atlético Paranaense
	Report	Marcos Guilherme 61'

Estádio Helenão, Juiz de Fora
Attendance: 12,917
Referee: Leandro Pedro Vuaden

=== Final ===
20 April 2016
21:45

Fluminense	1–0	Atlético Paranaense
Marcos Júnior 80'	Report

Estádio Helenão, Juiz de Fora
Attendance: 23,985
Referee: Sandro Meira Ricci
