= Alan Patrick (footballer, born 1991) =

Brazilian footballer (born 1991)

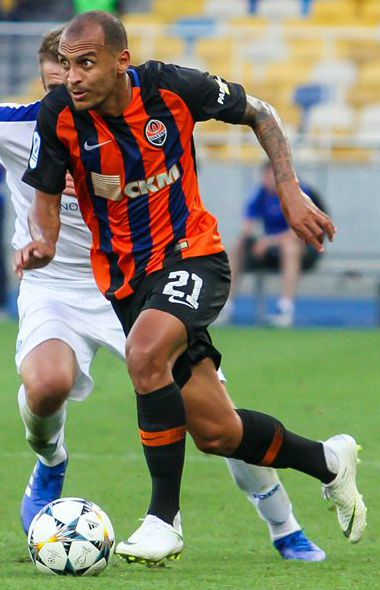
- Patrick with Shakhtar Donetsk in 2018

Personal information
- Full name: Alan Patrick Lourenço
- Date of birth: 13 May 1991 (age 35)
- Place of birth: Catanduva, Brazil
- Height: 1.77 m (5 ft 10 in)
- Positions: Attacking midfielder; central midfielder

Team information
- Current team: Internacional
- Number: 10

Youth career
- 2003–2010: Santos

Senior career*
Years	Team	Apps	(Gls)
2009–2011	Santos	23	(4)
2011–2022	Shakhtar Donetsk	121	(17)
2013–2014	→ Internacional (loan)	29	(2)
2015	→ Palmeiras (loan)	13	(1)
2015–2016	→ Flamengo (loan)	54	(11)
2022–	Internacional	159	(43)

International career
2008	Brazil U19	7	(2)
2011	Brazil U20	8	(1)
- * Club domestic league appearances and goals as of 8 April 2026

Alan Patrick Lourenço (born 13 May 1991) is a Brazilian footballer who plays as a midfielder for Internacional.

== Career ==
=== Santos ===
Alan Patrick played 39 games for Santos and scored seven goals. He helped Santos reach the final of the Copa São Paulo 2010, but the team lost 3–0 on penalties after a 1–1 tie in regulation time. On 12 May 2011, Patrick scored a crucial goal in the 2011 Copa Libertadores quarterfinals match against Once Caldas, which finished in a 1-0 away victory and sent Santos through to the semi-finals 2-1 on aggregate. Santos eventually won the tournament, with Patrick being part of the squad.

=== Shakhtar Donetsk ===
On 24 June 2011, Alan Patrick signed a five-year contract with Ukrainian giants Shakhtar Donetsk for €4 million.

Alan Patrick rarely featured for Shakhtar during his first season in Ukraine with his first appearance of the season in a competitive game coming on 12 September 2011 in the Ukrainian Cup against FC Shakhtar Sverdlovsk. He scored the first goal for his team in a 2–0 win. His league debut came on 21 April 2012 as a 73rd-minute substitute for Henrikh Mkhitaryan in a 3–1 victory over Tavriya Simferopol at the Donbas Arena. He made his next appearance the following season in a 4–1 league win over Vorskla Poltava in another substitute appearance, coming on in the 70th minute for Marko Dević. On 4 May 2013, he scored his first league goal for Shakhtar in a 1-1 draw against FC Mariupol.

==== Flamengo loan ====
On 11 June 2015, Alan Patrick joined Flamengo on a loan deal until December of the same year. He finished his first season for Flamengo with 27 appearances and being the club's league top scorer with 7 goals. However, in October 2016, Patrick, alongside Éverton, Marcelo Cirino, Pará and Paulinho got involved in trouble through the media due to excessive partying. The group of players were called "Bonde da Stella", because Stella Artois was the brand of beer they used to drink in those parties. All five players were fined causing embarrassment with the club's directors, but only Paulinho left the club for the following season on loan to Santos. Despite this problem his loan deal was eventually extended for another year.

==== Return to Shakhtar ====
He returned to Shakhtar in January 2017. Alan Patrick became an important member of the Shakhtar side during the 2017–18 season and helped the club to their second successive league and cup double. On 8 May 2018, he signed a contract extension until June 2022.

On 11 August 2020, Alan Patrick scored from the penalty spot as Shakhtar defeated FC Basel by a score of 4–1 to reach the semi-finals of the Europa League.

On 21 August 2020, Patrick scored two goals in Shakhtar's first league game of the 2020–21 season, a 3–1 win over Kolos Kovalivka.

=== Internacional ===
On 12 April 2022, Internacional announced the signing of Alan Patrick on a contract until April 2025, with Shakhtar confirming the move the following day. He had a good return season, playing 26 league matches and scoring 6 goals, including a brace against Goias. In the 2023 Copa Libertadores, he scored five goals, including a man of the match performance against Metropolitanos, where he scored and assisted Luiz Adriano for the 2–1 win that sent his club into the knockout stages of the competition. He also added goals in the quarter finals against River Plate and semi-finals against Fluminense, where they were eliminated.

== Career statistics ==
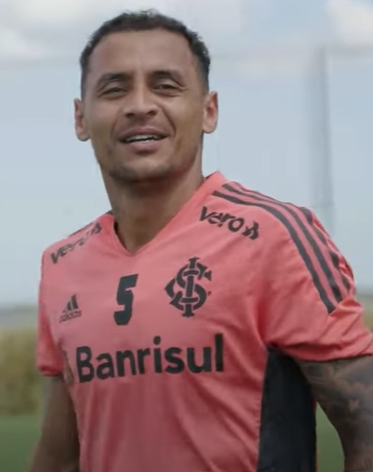
Alan Patrick with Internacional in 2023

As of 16 November 2025

Appearances and goals by club, season and competition
Club	Season	League			National cup (Note: Includes Ukrainian Cup, Copa do Brasil)		Continental		Other		Total	
Club	Season	Division	Apps	Goals	Apps	Goals	Apps	Goals	Apps	Goals	Apps	Goals
Santos	2009	Série A	3	0	0	0	0	0	0	0	3	0
Santos	2010	Série A	18	4	0	0	0	0	4	1	22	5
Santos	2011	Série A	2	0	0	0	5	1	7	1	14	2
Santos	Total		23	4	0	0	5	1	11	2	39	7
Shakhtar Donetsk	2011–12	Ukrainian Premier League	1	0	1	1	0	0	0	0	2	1
Shakhtar Donetsk	2012–13	Ukrainian Premier League	4	1	2	0	0	0	0	0	6	1
Shakhtar Donetsk	2016–17	Ukrainian Premier League	9	1	1	0	0	0	0	0	10	1
Shakhtar Donetsk	2017–18	Ukrainian Premier League	25	3	4	0	3	0	0	0	32	3
Shakhtar Donetsk	2018–19	Ukrainian Premier League	27	2	3	0	7	0	1 (Note: Appearance in Ukrainian Super Cup)	0	38	2
Shakhtar Donetsk	2019–20	Ukrainian Premier League	25	4	0	0	12	4	1	1	38	9
Shakhtar Donetsk	2020–21	Ukrainian Premier League	21	4	1	0	9	1	1	0	32	5
Shakhtar Donetsk	2021–22	Ukrainian Premier League	11	2	0	0	8	1	1	1	20	4
Shakhtar Donetsk	Total		123	17	12	1	39	6	4	2	174	26
Internacional (loan)	2013	Série A	5	0	1	0	0	0	0	0	6	0
Internacional (loan)	2014	Série A	24	2	5	0	2	0	15	3	46	5
Internacional (loan)	Total		29	2	6	0	2	0	15	3	52	5
Palmeiras (loan)	2015	Série A	2	0	2	0	0	0	9 (Note: Appearances in Campeonato Paulista)	1	13	1
Flamengo (loan)	2015	Série A	26	7	0	0	0	0	2 (Note: Appearances in Campeonato Carioca)	0	28	7
Flamengo (loan)	2016	Série A	28	4	3	1	4	2	13	1	48	8
Flamengo (loan)	Total		54	11	3	1	4	2	15	1	76	15
Internacional	2022	Série A	26	6	0	0	4	1	0	0	30	7
Internacional	2023	Série A	34	4	3	3	12	5	13	4	62	16
Internacional	2024	Série A	22	8	4	0	7	1	7	3	40	12
Internacional	2025	Série A	30	11	4	2	0	0	8	3	42	14
Internacional	Total		108	29	14	6	16	6	20	7	174	51
Career total			287	53	30	7	66	15	82	19	528	105

== Honours ==
=== Club ===
Santos

- Campeonato Paulista: 2010, 2011
- Copa do Brasil: 2010
- Copa Libertadores: 2011

Shakhtar Donetsk

- Ukrainian Premier League: 2011–12, 2012–13, 2016–17, 2017–18, 2018–19, 2019–20
- Ukrainian Cup: 2011–12, 2012–13, 2016–17, 2017–18, 2018–19
- Ukrainian Super Cup: 2017, 2021

Internacional

- Campeonato Gaúcho: 2014, 2025
- Recopa Gaúcha: 2026

Palmeiras

- Copa do Brasil: 2015

Individual

- Ukrainian Premier League Top Assists Provider: 2020-21
- Copa Libertadores Team of the Tournament: 2023
- Campeonato Brasileiro Série A Team of the Year: 2024
- Bola de Prata: 2024
- Troféu Mesa Redonda Team of the Year: 2024

=== International ===
- South American Youth Championship: 2011
- FIFA U-20 World Cup: 2011
