= Marcos Júnior =

Brazilian footballer (born 1993)

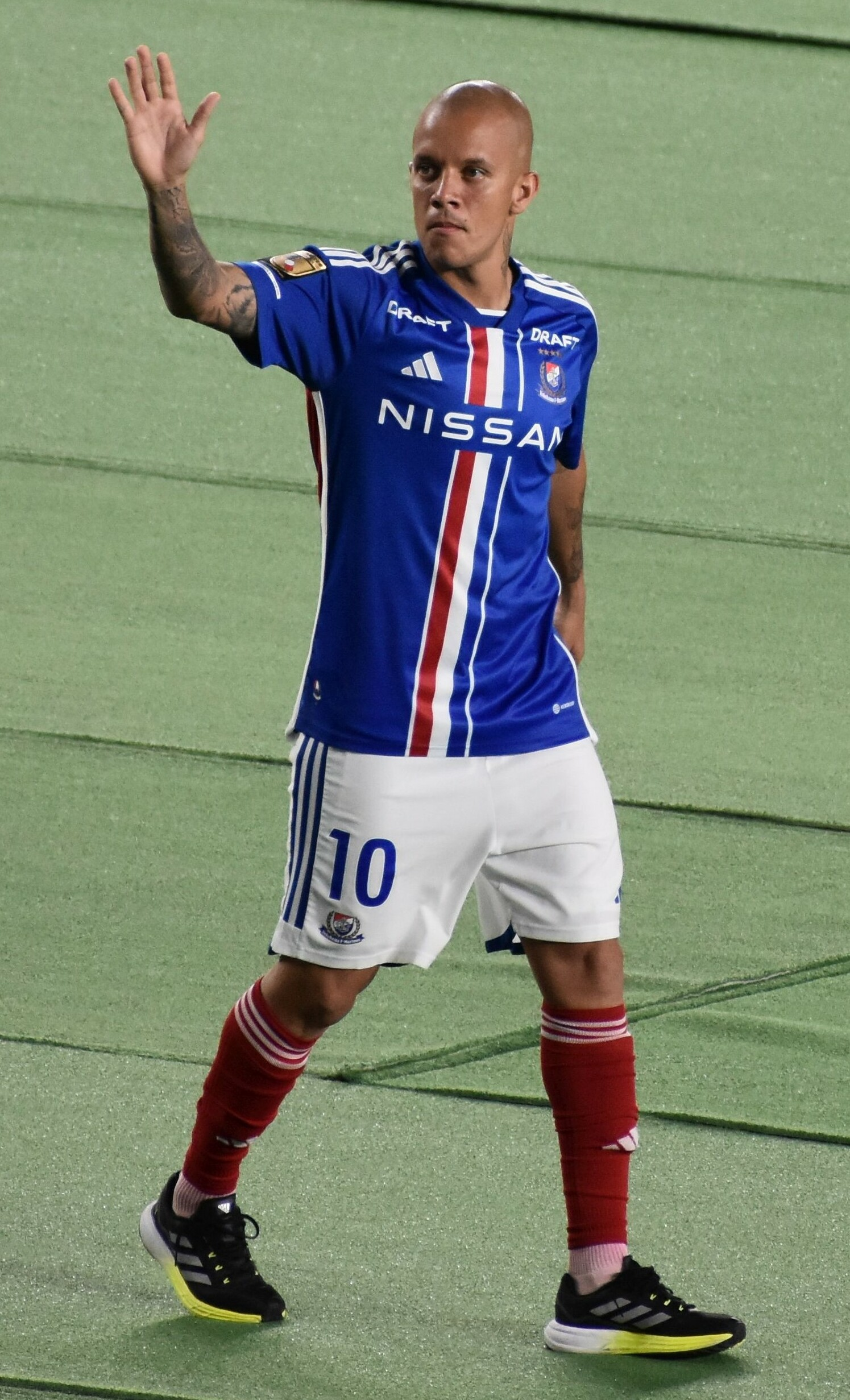

Personal information
- Full name: Marcos Júnior Lima dos Santos
- Date of birth: 19 January 1993 (age 33)
- Place of birth: Gama, Federal District, Brazil
- Height: 1.67 m (5 ft 6 in)
- Positions: Attacking midfielder; winger

Team information
- Current team: Cuiabá
- Number: 23

Youth career
- 2008–2012: Fluminense

Senior career*
Years	Team	Apps	(Gls)
2012–2018	Fluminense	139	(17)
2014	→ Vitória (loan)	6	(0)
2019–2023	Yokohama F. Marinos	135	(37)
2023–2025	Sanfrecce Hiroshima	23	(3)
2026–	Cuiabá	7	(0)

International career^{‡}
2011	Brazil U18	5	(2)
2013	Brazil U20	10	(0)
- * Club domestic league appearances and goals as of 18 November 2026 ‡ National team caps and goals as of 22:50

Marcos Júnior Lima dos Santos (born 19 January 1993), known as Marcos Júnior, is a Brazilian professional footballer who plays as an attacking midfielder or a winger for Cuiabá.

== Club career ==
=== Fluminense ===
Marcos Júnior started his youth career in Fluminese. He was promoted to the first team in 2012 and with 16 matches played in the league competition he was part of the Fluminese team that went on to win the Brazil Serie A trophy that year. Marcos Júnior scored on his league debut against Macaé on 21 April 2012.

=== EC Vitória ===
On 1 June 2014, Fluminense loaned Marcos Júnior out to EC Vitória until 31 December 2014. He made his league debut against Chapecoense on 17 August 2014.

=== Yokohama F. Marinos ===
On 4 January 2019, Marcos Júnior signed with Yokohama F. Marinos in the J. League Division 1. On 23 February 2019, he made his debut against Gamba Osaka. On 10 March 2019, he scored his first goal for the club against Kawasaki Frontale, scoring in the 23rd minute.

The 15 goals he scored in his first season in the J1 League was enough to crown him the highest goal-scorer in the league, along with Teruto Nakagawa. and was vital for Yokohama F. Marinos as they clinched the 2019 J1 League. He was also named in the J.League Best XI.

=== Sanfrecce Hiroshima ===
On 11 August 2023, it was announced that Marcos Júnior departs Marinos to join 3-time J1 Champions, Sanfrecce Hiroshima. He scored on his league debut against Kawasaki Frontale on 19 August 2023, scoring in the 60th minute.

== Personal life ==
Marcos Júnior is a big fan of the Dragon Ball franchise, and sometimes performs a Kamehameha after scoring a goal.

== Career statistics ==
As of match played 30 September 2025

Appearances and goals by club, season and competition
Club	Season	League			State League		National cup		League cup		Continental		Other		Total	
Club	Season	Division	Apps	Goals	Apps	Goals	Apps	Goals	Apps	Goals	Apps	Goals	Apps	Goals	Apps	Goals
Fluminense	2012	Série A	16	1	4	2	—		—		4 (Note: Copa Libertadores)	0	—		24	3
Fluminense	2013	Série A	10	0	7	2	1	0	—		1	0	—		19	2
Fluminense	2014	Série A	—		6	1	—		—		—		—		6	1
Fluminense	2015	Série A	30	5	2	0	6	2	—		—		—		38	7
Fluminense	2016	Série A	30	6	15	0	6	2	—		—		4 (Note: Primeira Liga)	1	55	9
Fluminense	2017	Série A	25	3	14	1	6	1	—		4 (Note: Copa Sudamericana)	0	4	0	53	5
Fluminense	2018	Série A	28	2	10	6	4	1	—		6	0	—		48	9
Fluminense	Total		139	17	58	12	23	6	—		15	0	8	1	243	36
Vitória (loan)	2014	Série A	6	0	—		—		—		4	0	—		10	0
Yokohama F. Marinos	2019	J1 League	33	15	—		0	0	0	0	—		—		33	15
Yokohama F. Marinos	2020	J1 League	28	11	—		—		2	0	6	1	1 (Note: Japanese Super Cup)	1	37	13
Yokohama F. Marinos	2021	J1 League	33	9	—		1	0	5	0	—		—		39	9
Yokohama F. Marinos	2022	J1 League	23	0	—		1	0	2	0	5	1	—		31	1
Yokohama F. Marinos	2023	J1 League	18	2	—		2	0	6	1	—		1	0	27	3
Yokohama F. Marinos	Total		135	37	—		4	0	15	1	11	2	2	1	167	41
Sanfrecce Hiroshima	2023	J1 League	7	1	—		0	0	0	0	—		—		7	1
Sanfrecce Hiroshima	2024	J1 League	12	2	—		2	1	1	1	4	0	0	0	19	5
Sanfrecce Hiroshima	2025	J1 League	4	0	—		1	2	3	0	2	1	0	0	10	3
Sanfrecce Hiroshima	Total		23	3	—		3	3	4	1	6	1	0	0	36	9
Career total			303	57	58	12	30	8	19	2	36	3	10	2	456	86

== Honours ==
Fluminense

- Campeonato Carioca: 2012
- Campeonato Brasileiro Série A: 2012
- Primeira Liga: 2016
- Taça Guanabara: 2017
- Taça Rio: 2018

Yokohama F. Marinos

- J1 League: 2019, 2022

Sanfrecce Hiroshima

- J.League Cup: 2025

Individual

- Campeonato Carioca Team of the year: 2018
- J.League Top Scorer: 2019
- J.League Best XI: 2019
