= Rafael Dumas =

Brazilian footballer

Personal information
- Full name: Rafael Dumas Ribeiro
- Date of birth: 13 March 1995 (age 31)
- Place of birth: Rio de Janeiro, Brazil
- Height: 1.84 m (6 ft 1/2 in)
- Position: Defender

Youth career
- 2010–2012: Audax Rio
- 2011–2015: Flamengo

Senior career*
| Years | Team | Apps | (Gls) |
| 2015–2017 | Flamengo | 1 | (0) |
| 2016 | → FC Goa (loan) | 11 | (0) |
| 2017 | → Global F.C. (loan) | 0 | (0) |
| 2017 | → Luverdense (loan) | 0 | (0) |
| 2017 | → Paysandu (loan) | 7 | (0) |
| 2018 | Brasil de Pelotas | 22 | (2) |
| 2019 | Shonan Bellmare | 26 | (0) |
| 2020 | Náutico | 3 | (0) |
| 2021 | Portuguesa | 1 | (0) |
| 2021 | Esportivo | 20 | (1) |
| 2022 | Caxias | 16 | (0) |
| 2023 | Brasil de Pelotas | 25 | (0) |
- * Club domestic league appearances and goals as of 6 August 2023

Rafael Dumas Ribeiro (born 13 March 1995) is a Brazilian professional footballer who plays as a defender. He started his career at club Flamengo and previously had loan spells at FC Goa 2016 and at Global, Luverdense and Paysandu in 2017.

== Career ==
=== Early career ===
Born in Rio de Janeiro, Dumas started his career in his home city with Portuguesa, playing futsal under the coaching of Zé Ricardo, his coach at Flamengo. When he was thirteen he moved to Audax Rio before going on loan with Flamengo. After impressing the coaching staff at Flamengo, Dumas was signed permanently.

=== Flamengo ===
On 25 May 2016, Dumas made his professional debut for Flamengo in a Brazilian Série A match against Chapecoense at Estádio Raulino de Oliveira. He came on as a 13th minute substitute for Juan as Flamengo drew the match 2–2.

==== FC Goa (loan) ====
On 1 September 2016 it was announced that Dumas had been sent on loan to FC Goa of the Indian Super League. He made his debut for the side in their opening match of the season against NorthEast United. He started and played the full match as Goa lost 2–0.

==== Global (loan) ====
On 14 January 2017 Global F.C. signed Dumas on loan until the end of 2017. He didn't play a single match for the club and quickly returned to Flamengo.

==== Paysandu (loan) ====
On 23 August 2017 Dumas signed on loan with Paysandu until the end of the 2017 season.

== Career statistics ==
=== Club ===
As of 6 August 2023.

| Club | Season | League | | | State League | | Cup | | Continental | | Other | | Total | |
| Club | Season | Division | Apps | Goals | Apps | Goals | Apps | Goals | Apps | Goals | Apps | Goals | Apps | Goals |
|---|---|---|---|---|---|---|---|---|---|---|---|---|---|---|
| Flamengo | 2015 | Série A | 0 | 0 | — | | 0 | 0 | 0 | 0 | — | | 0 | 0 |
| Flamengo | 2016 | Série A | 1 | 0 | — | | 0 | 0 | 0 | 0 | — | | 1 | 0 |
| Flamengo | Total | | 1 | 0 | — | | 0 | 0 | 0 | 0 | — | | 1 | 0 |
| FC Goa (loan) | 2016 | Indian Super League | 11 | 0 | — | | 0 | 0 | — | | — | | 11 | 0 |
| Luverdense (loan) | 2017 | Série B | 0 | 0 | — | | — | | — | | — | | 0 | 0 |
| Paysandu (loan) | 2017 | Série B | 7 | 0 | — | | — | | — | | — | | 7 | 0 |
| Brasil de Pelotas | 2018 | Série B | 22 | 2 | 2 | 0 | — | | — | | — | | 24 | 2 |
| Shonan Bellmare | 2019 | J1 League | 1 | 0 | — | | 0 | 0 | — | | — | | 1 | 0 |
| Náutico | 2020 | Série B | — | | 2 | 0 | — | | — | | 1 | 0 | 3 | 0 |
| Portuguesa | 2021 | — | | | 1 | 0 | — | | — | | — | | 1 | 0 |
| Esportivo | 2021 | Série D | 17 | 1 | 3 | 0 | — | | — | | — | | 20 | 1 |
| Caxias | 2022 | Série D | 6 | 0 | 10 | 0 | — | | — | | — | | 16 | 0 |
| Brasil de Pelotas | 2023 | Série D | 15 | 0 | 10 | 0 | — | | — | | — | | 25 | 0 |
| Career total | | | 80 | 3 | 28 | 0 | 0 | 0 | 0 | 0 | 1 | 0 | 109 | 3 |

== Honours ==
Luverdense

- Copa Verde: 2017
