= Everton (footballer, born 1988) =

Brazilian footballer

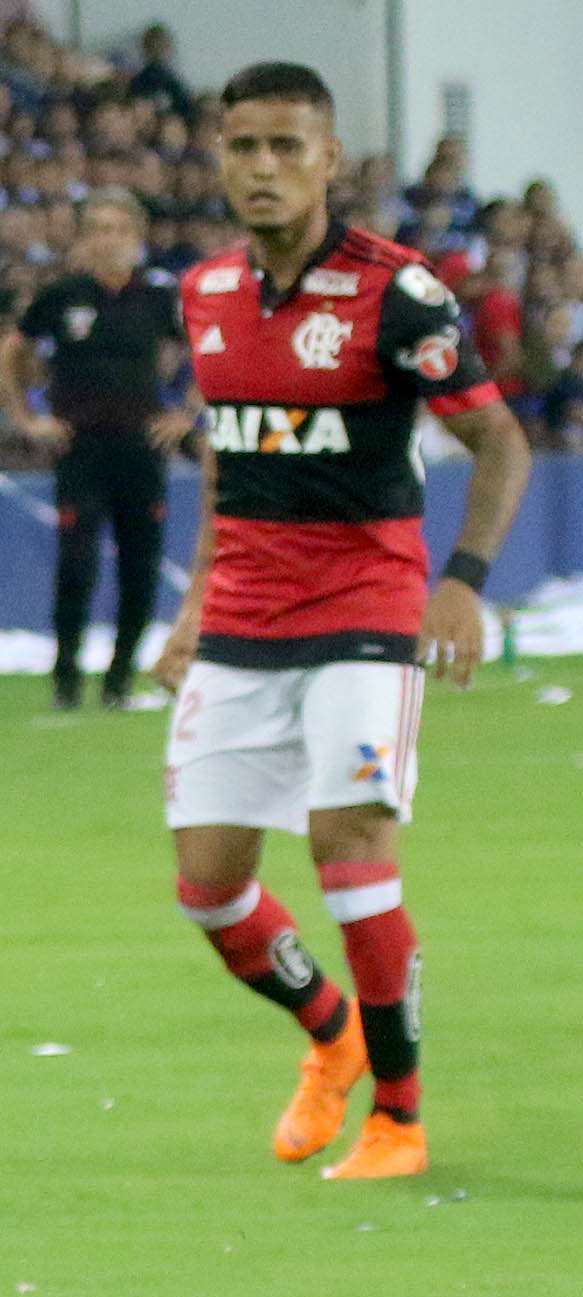
- Everton playing for Flamengo in 2017

Personal information
- Full name: Everton Cardoso da Silva
- Date of birth: 11 December 1988 (age 37)
- Place of birth: Nortelândia, Brazil
- Height: 1.72 m (5 ft 8 in)
- Position: Winger

Youth career
- 2005–2007: Paraná

Senior career*
Years	Team	Apps	(Gls)
2006–2008	Paraná	70	(7)
2008–2009	Desportivo Brasil	0	(0)
2008–2009	→ Flamengo (loan)	47	(4)
2010–2013	Tigres UANL	15	(0)
2011	→ Botafogo (loan)	28	(1)
2012	→ Suwon Bluewings (loan)	29	(7)
2013	→ Athletico Paranaense (loan)	33	(3)
2014–2018	Flamengo	162	(24)
2018–2020	São Paulo	62	(8)
2020–2022	Grêmio	24	(2)
2022	→ Cuiabá (loan)	7	(1)
2022	→ Ponte Preta (loan)	3	(0)
2023	Ponte Preta	5	(0)
- * Club domestic league appearances and goals as of 12:00, 12 October 2024 (UTC)

Everton Cardoso da Silva (born 11 December 1988), simply known as Everton, is a Brazilian professional footballer who plays as a left winger.

== Career ==
=== Paraná ===
Éverton began his football career at the age of 13, when he joined the youth academy of Paraná. Five years later, in 2007, he stood out in the Copa São Paulo de Juniores. Zetti, then the head coach of Paraná's first team, quickly promoted him to the professional squad. During the 2007 Brazilian Championship, he was called up to the Brazil U-20 national team for the FIFA U-20 World Cup, held in July 2007 in Canada. Having performed well in the tournament, he drew the attention of Internacional. However, Paraná managed to keep him until the end of the season. After being relegated to Serie B in 2007, Paraná transferred Éverton to Flamengo.

==== Flamengo (loan) ====
On 19 August 2008, Everton joined Série A club Flamengo. On 31 August 2008, he debuted for Flamengo already playing in the first team, in the Fla-Flu derby, when his club and Fluminense drew 2–2 for the Série A.

In 2009, with coach Cuca Everton began playing as a left wing back replacing Juan for several matches. Also in 2009 he scored his first goal for Flamengo in the Série A in a 3–1 win against Atlético Mineiro; besides the goal he managed to grab an assist, being one of the best players in that match.

=== Tigres UANL ===
In January 2010 Everton signed his transfer to Tigres UANL for US$6 million, the third highest fee paid by a Mexican club.

==== Botafogo (loan) ====
In January 2011 Botafogo loaned Everton from Tigres UANL until the end of the year.

=== Flamengo ===
On 27 December 2013, Flamengo announced Everton's signing from Tigres UANL.

In October 2016 Everton, alongside Alan Patrick, Marcelo Cirino, Pará and Paulinho got involved in trouble through the media due to excessive partying. The group of players were called "Bonde da Stella", because of the name of a brand of beer they used to drink in those parties. All five players were fined causing embarrassment with the club's directors, but only Paulinho left the club for the following season on loan to Santos.

On 3 February 2017, Everton agreed to a contract extension with Flamengo until 2019.

On 5 July 2017, Everton completed 100 Série A matches for Flamengo playing against São Paulo.

=== São Paulo ===
On 17 April 2018, São Paulo signed Everton after agreeing to pay his €3,5m release clause from Flamengo on a contract until 30 June 2021.

== Personal life ==
His younger brother Ebert Cardoso da Silva is also a professional football player.

== Career statistics ==
As of 25 November 2021

Appearances and goals by club, season and competition
Club	Season	League			State League		Cup		Continental		Other		Total	
Club	Season	Division	Apps	Goals	Apps	Goals	Apps	Goals	Apps	Goals	Apps	Goals	Apps	Goals
Paraná	2007	Série A	29	2	8 (Note: Appearance(s) in Campeonato Paranaense)	1	—		—		—		37	3
Paraná	2008	Série B	17	2	16	2	4	0	—		—		37	4
Paraná	Total		46	4	24	3	4	0	—		—		74	7
Flamengo	2008	Série A	10	0	—		—		—		—		10	0
Flamengo	2009	Série A	28	2	9 (Note: Appearance(s) in Campeonato Carioca)	2	2	0	2 (Note: Appearance(s) in Copa Sudamericana)	0	—		41	4
Flamengo	Total		38	2	9	2	2	0	2	0	—		51	4
Tigres UANL	2009–10	Liga MX	7	0	—		—		—		—		7	0
Tigres UANL	2010–11	Liga MX	8	2	—		—		—		—		8	2
Tigres UANL	Total		15	2	—		—		—		—		15	2
Botafogo (loan)	2011	Série A	17	0	11	1	2	0	1	0	—		31	1
Suwon Bluewings (loan)	2012	K-League	29	7	—		—		—		—		29	7
Atlético Paranaense	2013	Série A	33	3	—		11	1	—		—		44	4
Flamengo	2014	Série A	28	4	9	2	6	1	6 (Note: Appearance(s) in Copa Libertadores)	3	—		49	10
Flamengo	2015	Série A	33	4	10	2	4	0	—		—		47	6
Flamengo	2016	Série A	30	3	6	0	1	0	1	1	3 (Note: Appearance(s) in Primeira Liga)	1	41	5
Flamengo	2017	Série A	27	4	10	3	6	1	11 (Note: Four appearances in Copa Libertadores, four appearances in Copa Sudamericana)	1	2	1	56	10
Flamengo	2018	Série A	0	0	9	2	0	0	2	1	—		11	3
Flamengo	Total		118	15	44	9	17	2	20	6	5	2	204	34
São Paulo	2018	Série A	27	5	—		0	0	2	0	—		29	5
São Paulo	2019	Série A	16	1	11 (Note: Appearance(s) in Campeonato Paulista)	1	2	0	2	0	—		21	2
São Paulo	2020	Série A	0	0	8	1	0	0	0	0	—		8	1
São Paulo	Total		43	6	19	2	2	0	4	0	—		58	8
Grêmio	2020	Série A	17	1	2 (Note: Appearance(s) in Campeonato Gaúcho)	1	6	0	3	0	—		28	2
Grêmio	2021	Série A	4	0	1	0	1	0	0	0	—		6	0
Grêmio	Total		21	1	3	1	7	0	3	0	—		34	2
Career total			360	40	110	19	45	3	30	6	5	2	550	69

== Honours ==
Flamengo

- Campeonato Carioca: 2009, 2014, 2017
- Campeonato Brasileiro Série A: 2009

Grêmio

- Campeonato Gaúcho: 2020, 2021
- Recopa Gaúcha: 2021
