= Ederson (footballer, born January 1986) =

Brazilian footballer

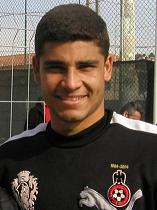
- Ederson

Personal information
- Full name: Ederson Honorato Campos
- Date of birth: 13 January 1986 (age 40)
- Place of birth: Parapuã, Brazil
- Height: 1.81 m (5 ft 11 in)
- Position: Midfielder

Youth career
- 2000: Palmeiras
- 2001–2003: RS Futebol

Senior career*
| Years | Team | Apps | (Gls) |
| 2004 | Internacional | 3 | (0) |
| 2004–2005 | Juventude | 5 | (1) |
| 2005–2008 | Nice | 91 | (16) |
| 2008–2012 | Lyon | 82 | (11) |
| 2012–2015 | Lazio | 34 | (3) |
| 2015–2018 | Flamengo | 21 | (4) |
| Total | | 236 | (35) |

International career
| 2003 | Brazil U-17 | 6 | (2) |
| 2010 | Brazil | 1 | (0) |
- * Club domestic league appearances and goals as of 2 July 2018

Ederson Honorato Campos (born 13 January 1986) is a Brazilian former professional footballer who played as a midfielder.

== Club career ==
=== Early career ===
Ederson began his footballing career playing on the streets of São Paulo. When he was 15, he joined Brazilian second tier club RS Futebol. After a year of obscurity, Ederson joined top division side Juventude, who, at the time, was managed by Ricardo Gomes, who would go on manage top French clubs Bordeaux and Monaco. Ederson flourished at Juventude. His performances earned him a call up to the Brazil under-17 team, whom he helped win the 2003 FIFA U-17 World Cup held in Finland.

=== Move to Europe ===
Like most Brazilian men's footballers, Ederson's ideal destination was Europe, where he believed he could further his development. In January 2005, Ederson agreed to join French club OGC Nice, initially as a loan, after being approached by then-Nice manager Gernot Rohr who scouted the player through videotapes. He made his league debut on 5 February 2005 in a match against Metz coming on as a substitute in the 72nd minute. On just his third appearance with the club, he scored his first goal in the 66th minute with an extraordinary shot from almost 45 meters out against nearby rivals Monaco. The goal turned out to the game winner as Nice won the match 2–1.

The following season, Ederson was handed the number 10 shirt, but was limited to mostly substitute appearances. He still managed to score two goals in 20 appearances. The 2006–07 season effectively brought Ederson into the limelight as he made a career-high 30 appearances and scored 6 goals, including a game winning penalty in the 90th minute against Marseille and a brace against Bordeaux, though Nice finished in 16th position. Still, his dazzling performances caught the eye of several big clubs, notably Real Madrid, Manchester United, Juventus, and Lazio, to name a few.

=== Final season at Nice and Lyon ===
Ederson's final season at Nice was his best starting all 36 matches he appeared in and scored 7 goals. In January 2008, Ederson and Nice agreed to a move to French champions Olympique Lyonnais for a fee of €14 million with Nice likely to receive another €1 million based on incentives. He allegedly snubbed European heavyweights Manchester United and Real Madrid, according to Lyon chairman Jean-Michel Aulas. As per the agreement, Ederson was allowed to finished the 2007–08 season with Nice scoring his 6th and 7th goal on the last two match days of the season.

He officially joined Lyon in June 2008 along with Nice teammate Hugo Lloris. Considered a perfect replacement for the aging Juninho, he was given the number 7 shirt and made his debut on the opening day of the season in a 3–0 victory over Toulouse coming on as a substitute in the 74th minute. He scored his first goal for Lyon with a penalty kick against Le Havre on 20 September 2008. It was the only goal of the match. In January 2009, he scored in back to back matches against Lorient with another penalty kick and Grenoble. He appeared in all eight of Lyon's UEFA Champions League matches and has been one of Lyon's more consistent players despite playing the majority of matches in the unfamiliar winger position, whilst at Nice, he operated mainly as an attacking midfielder.

=== Move to Lazio ===
Ederson acquired Italian nationality in 2012 after his marriage with an Italian citizen. On 2 July 2012, Ederson joined Serie A side Lazio on a five-year contract. Ederson has had an interrupted preseason with a few minor injuries but has managed to score two goals in 5 appearances for the biancocelesti.

=== Move to Flamengo ===
On 21 July 2015, Ederson joined Brazilian Série A club Flamengo.

=== Retirement ===
After spending more than a year away from the pitch because of persistent knee pains, he announced his retirement on January 1, 2020 in an interview with a television station.

== International career ==
As mentioned, Ederson was a part of the Brazil under-17 team that won the 2003 FIFA U-17 World Cup.

In 2008 he was included in Brazil's preliminary squad to the 2008 Summer Olympics, however he did not get a place in the final list by coach Dunga.

On 26 July 2010, he was called up for the first time to the senior team to participate in the team's August 2010 friendly against the United States. Prior to representing Brazil, Ederson was also eligible to appear for France under residency rules. He earned his first cap in a friendly game against the United States but unfortunately after a couple of minutes he got injured and was replaced immediately by Carlos Eduardo.

== Career statistics ==
As of 2 July 2018)

| Club | Season | League | | | Cup | | Continental | | State League | | Total | |
| Club | Season | Division | Apps | Goals | Apps | Goals | Apps | Goals | Apps | Goals | Apps | Goals |
|---|---|---|---|---|---|---|---|---|---|---|---|---|
| Nice | 2004–05 | Ligue 1 | 5 | 1 | 0 | 0 | - | - | - | - | 5 | 1 |
| Nice | 2005–06 | Ligue 1 | 20 | 2 | 1 | 0 | - | - | - | - | 21 | 2 |
| Nice | 2006–07 | Ligue 1 | 30 | 6 | 0 | 0 | - | - | - | - | 30 | 6 |
| Nice | 2007–08 | Ligue 1 | 36 | 7 | 0 | 0 | - | - | - | - | 36 | 7 |
| Nice | Total | | 91 | 16 | 1 | 0 | - | - | - | - | 92 | 16 |
| Lyon | 2008–09 | Ligue 1 | 35 | 5 | 0 | 0 | 8 | 0 | - | - | 43 | 5 |
| Lyon | 2009–10 | Ligue 1 | 24 | 2 | 3 | 0 | 10 | 0 | - | - | 37 | 2 |
| Lyon | 2010–11 | Ligue 1 | 8 | 2 | 0 | 0 | - | - | - | - | 8 | 2 |
| Lyon | 2011–12 | Ligue 1 | 15 | 2 | 4 | 0 | 6 | 0 | - | - | 25 | 2 |
| Lyon | Total | | 82 | 11 | 7 | 0 | 24 | 0 | - | - | 113 | 11 |
| Lazio | 2012–13 | Serie A | 15 | 1 | 0 | 0 | 8 | 2 | - | - | 23 | 3 |
| Lazio | 2013–14 | Serie A | 15 | 1 | 2 | 0 | 5 | 0 | - | - | 22 | 1 |
| Lazio | 2014–15 | Serie A | 4 | 1 | 1 | 0 | - | - | - | - | 5 | 1 |
| Lazio | Total | | 34 | 3 | 3 | 0 | 13 | 2 | - | - | 50 | 5 |
| Flamengo | 2015 | Série A | 8 | 3 | 2 | 0 | - | - | - | - | 10 | 3 |
| Flamengo | 2016 | Série A | 8 | 1 | 4 | 0 | 0 | 0 | 9 | 0 | 21 | 1 |
| Flamengo | 2017 | Série A | 5 | 0 | 2 | 0 | 0 | 0 | 0 | 0 | 7 | 0 |
| Flamengo | 2018 | Série A | 0 | 0 | 0 | 0 | 0 | 0 | 0 | 0 | 0 | 0 |
| Flamengo | Total | | 21 | 4 | 8 | 0 | 0 | 0 | 9 | 0 | 38 | 4 |
| Total | | | 228 | 34 | 19 | 0 | 37 | 2 | 9 | 0 | 293 | 36 |

== Honours ==
Brazil U-17

- FIFA U-17 World Cup: 2003

Lazio

- Coppa Italia: 2012–13

Flamengo

- Campeonato Carioca: 2017
