= Tuca Guimarães =

Brazilian association football manager

Personal information
- Full name: Antônio Carlos Guimarães
- Date of birth: 12 April 1973 (age 53)
- Place of birth: São Paulo, Brazil

Managerial career
- Years: Team
- 2000: Corinthians (futsal)
- 2001–2002: Santos (futsal)
- 2002–2003: Deporcentro Casuarinas
- 2003: Joaçaba (futsal)
- 2004–2006: Banespa (futsal)
- 2007: Macaé (futsal)
- 2007–2008: Garça/Banespa (futsal)
- 2008: Peru (futsal)
- 2009: Garça Futsal
- 2009–2010: Cortiana Futsal
- 2010–2011: São Paulo (youth)
- 2011: Marília
- 2012: Taboão da Serra
- 2012–2013: Sobradinho (assistant)
- 2013–2014: Nacional-MG
- 2014: Guaçuano
- 2014: Comercial-SP
- 2014: Catanduvense
- 2014–2015: São José-SP
- 2015: Nacional-SP
- 2015: Atlético Sorocaba
- 2015–2016: Figueirense (assistant)
- 2016: Figueirense
- 2017: Portuguesa
- 2017: Nacional-SP
- 2018: Noroeste
- 2018–2019: Boa Esporte
- 2019: Linense
- 2019: Atibaia
- 2020: Nacional-SP
- 2021: Uberlândia
- 2021: Treze
- 2021: Juventus Jaraguá
- 2022: Juventus-SP
- 2022: Boa Esporte
- 2023: Monte Azul
- 2023: Patrocinense
- 2024: Audax Rio
- 2024: Moto Club

Antônio Carlos Guimarães (born 12 April 1973), known as Tuca Guimarães, is a Brazilian football coach.

Starting his career in futsal, Tuca moved to football in 2010 with São Paulo's youth setup. In 2016, he managed Série A club Figueirense for eight matches.

== Honours ==
=== Futsal ===
Deporcentro Casuarinas

- Peruvian Futsal Championship: 2003

Banespa

- Campeonato Paulista: 2004, 2005, 2006

Garça/Banespa

- Liga Sudeste: 2007
- Copa dos Campeões: 2008

Cortiana Futsal

- Copa Gramado: 2010

=== Manager ===
Nacional-SP

- Campeonato Paulista Série A3: 2017
