= Alejandro Donatti =

Argentine footballer (born 1986)

Personal information
- Full name: Alejandro César Donatti
- Date of birth: 24 October 1986 (age 40)
- Place of birth: Rafaela, Argentina
- Height: 1.92 m (6 ft 4 in)
- Position: Centre-back

Youth career
- 2000–2004: 9 de Julio

Senior career*
Years	Team	Apps	(Gls)
2004–2007	9 de Julio	0	(0)
2006	→ San Lorenzo (loan)	0	(0)
2006	→ Genoa (loan)	0	(0)
2006	→ Tiro Federal (loan)	0	(0)
2007–2008	Libertad de Sunchales	0	(0)
2008–2013	Boca Unidos	69	(4)
2012–2013	→ Tigre (loan)	25	(4)
2013–2016	Rosario Central	90	(7)
2016–2017	Flamengo	2	(0)
2017–2018	Club Tijuana	13	(0)
2018–2020	Racing	44	(4)
2020–2022	San Lorenzo	31	(0)
- * Club domestic league appearances and goals as of 17:25, 24 April 2022 (UTC)

Alejandro César Donatti (born 24 October 1986) is an Argentine footballer who plays as a centre-back.

== Career ==
=== Tigre ===
Donatti played in 2012–13 season on loan for Tigre and was a member of the campaign in the 2012 Copa Sudamericana in which the club finished as runners-up.

=== Flamengo ===
Donatti was signed by Flamengo on a three-year contract on 6 July 2016. On 31 July 2016 Donatti debuted for his new club replacing injured Juan on the 55th minute, Flamengo won Coritiba 2–0. His first match as a starter was on 24 August 2016 playing in the Copa Sudamericana match against Figueirense, Donatti didn't have a good match, including an error in one of the goals that Flamengo suffered, his team lost 4–2 in Estádio Orlando Scarpelli.

=== Club Tijuana ===
On June 21, 2017 Club Tijuana signed Donatti from Flamengo for US$1,65m.

=== Career statistics ===
(Correct As of 21 June 2017)

Appearances and goals by club, season and competition
Club	Season	League			Cup		Continental		Other		Total	
Club	Season	Division	Apps	Goals	Apps	Goals	Apps	Goals	Apps	Goals	Apps	Goals
Boca Unidos	2009–10	Primera B	18	0	—		—		—		18	0
Boca Unidos	2010–11	Primera B	19	1	—		—		—		19	1
Boca Unidos	2011–12	Primera B	32	3	1	1	—		—		33	4
Boca Unidos	Total		69	4	1	1	0	0	0	0	70	5
Tigre
Tigre	2012–13	Primera División	25	4	—		14 (Note: Six appearances in Copa Libertadores, eight appearances and two goals in Copa Sudamericana)	2	—		39	6
Tigre	Total		25	4	0	0	14	2	0	0	39	6
Rosario Central
Rosario Central	2013–14	Primera División	36	3	3	1	—		—		39	4
Rosario Central	2014	Primera División	13	0	—		1 (Note: Appearance(s) in Copa Sudamericana)	0	—		14	0
Rosario Central	2015	Primera División	28	3	6	0	—		—		34	3
Rosario Central	2016	Primera División	13	1	—		9 (Note: Appearance(s) in Copa Libertadores)	4	—		22	5
Rosario Central	Total		90	7	9	1	10	4	0	0	109	12
Flamengo	2016	Série A	2	0	0	0	1	0	—		3	0
Flamengo	2017	Série A	0	0	0	0	1	0	7 (Note: Two appearances in Primeira Liga and five appearances in Rio de Janeiro State League)	0	8	0
Flamengo	Total		2	0	0	0	2	0	7	0	11	0
Career total			186	15	10	2	26	6	7	0	229	23

== Honours ==
Libertad de Sunchales

- Argentino B: 2007

Boca Unidos

- Argentino B: 2009

Flamengo

- Campeonato Carioca: 2017
