= Marcelo Cirino =

Brazilian footballer (born 1992)

Personal information
- Full name: Marcelo Cirino da Silva
- Date of birth: 22 January 1992 (age 34)
- Place of birth: Maringá, Brazil
- Height: 1.82 m (6 ft 0 in)
- Position: Winger

Youth career
- 2008–2009: Atlético Paranaense

Senior career*
| Years | Team | Apps | (Gls) |
| 2009–2019 | Athletico Paranaense | 173 | (48) |
| 2011 | → Vitória (loan) | 15 | (1) |
| 2015–2017 | → Flamengo (loan) | 84 | (19) |
| 2017 | → Internacional (loan) | 9 | (1) |
| 2017–2018 | → Al Nasr (loan) | 19 | (10) |
| 2020–2021 | Chongqing Lifan | 16 | (5) |
| 2021–2022 | Bahia | 4 | (0) |
| 2022–2023 | Athletico Paranaense | 15 | (0) |
| 2024 | Operário Ferroviário | 11 | (1) |
| 2025 | PSS Sleman | 15 | (3) |

International career
| 2008–2009 | Brazil U17 | 0 | (0) |
- * Club domestic league appearances and goals as of 24 May 2025

Marcelo Cirino da Silva (born 22 January 1992) is a Brazilian professional footballer who plays as a winger. He previously had played for Atlético Paranaense, winning the Brazilian Série A best newcomer award in 2013 and Vitória.

== Career ==
Born in Maringá, Paraná, Marcelo graduated from Atlético Paranaense's youth setup.

=== Atlético Paranaense ===
Cirino made his professional debut on 7 June 2009, playing the last 30 minutes of a 0–4 home loss against Atlético Mineiro for the Série A championship.

Marcelo scored his first goal on 15 November, netting his side's only in a 2–1 away defeat against Fluminense. He was also mainly a backup in the following campaign, appearing in only ten matches.

=== Vitória (loan) ===
On 15 March 2011, Marcelo was loaned to Vitória, in a season-long deal. As third-choice, he contributed with 15 appearances and one goal.

=== Atlético Paranaense return ===
Marcelo returned to Furacão in January 2012, and was an undisputed starter during the club's promotion campaign from Série B, scoring 16 goals and being top scorer. He was also an important attacking unit in the following year, being mostly deployed as a right winger and scoring seven goals, being awarded the tournament's best newcomer.

On 15 January 2014, Marcelo signed a new two-year deal with the club.

=== Flamengo ===
Cirino transferred to Flamengo from Atlético Paranaense on 2 January 2015. His signing was the highest fee paid in the club's history reaching the sum around R$16.5 million.

On 17 February 2017, Internacional came to terms with Flamengo and Atlético Paranaense (owner of 50% of the player's federative rights) to sign Cirino on loan until the end of 2017 season. Despite the previous agreement Internacional forfeited the offer on 6 March 2017.

=== Al Nasr (loan) ===
In his first international experience, Cirino joined Al Nasr Dubai in a one-year loan deal with Atlético Paranaense on 3 August 2017.

== Career statistics ==
As of match played 17 May 2025

Appearances and goals by club, season and competition
| Club | Season | League | | | State League | | Cup | | Continental | | Other | | Total | |
| Club | Season | Division | Apps | Goals | Apps | Goals | Apps | Goals | Apps | Goals | Apps | Goals | Apps | Goals |
|---|---|---|---|---|---|---|---|---|---|---|---|---|---|---|
| Athletico Paranaense | 2009 | Série A | 4 | 1 | — | | — | | — | | — | | 4 | 1 |
| Athletico Paranaense | 2010 | Série A | 10 | 0 | 9 | 2 | 3 | 0 | — | | — | | 22 | 2 |
| Athletico Paranaense | 2012 | Série B | 30 | 16 | 9 | 1 | 0 | 0 | — | | — | | 39 | 17 |
| Athletico Paranaense | 2013 | Série A | 31 | 7 | — | | 11 | 2 | — | | — | | 42 | 9 |
| Athletico Paranaense | 2014 | Série A | 33 | 5 | — | | 2 | 1 | 4 (Note: Appearance(s) in Copa Libertadores) | 0 | — | | 39 | 6 |
| Athletico Paranaense | 2018 | Série A | 17 | 4 | — | | — | | 10 (Note: Appearance(s) in Copa Sudamericana) | 2 | — | | 27 | 6 |
| Athletico Paranaense | 2019 | Série A | 30 | 11 | — | | 7 | 0 | 7 | 0 | 2 (Note: One appearance in Recopa Sudamericana, One appearance and one goal in J.League Cup / Copa Sudamericana Championship) | 1 | 46 | 12 |
| Athletico Paranaense | Total | | 155 | 45 | 18 | 3 | 23 | 3 | 21 | 2 | 2 | 1 | 219 | 54 |
| Vitória (loan) | 2011 | Série B | 15 | 1 | — | | — | | — | | — | | 15 | 1 |
| Flamengo (loan) | 2015 | Série A | 21 | 1 | 17 | 9 | 5 | 1 | — | | — | | 43 | 11 |
| Flamengo (loan) | 2016 | Série A | 24 | 2 | 19 | 7 | 4 | 2 | 3 | 1 | — | | 50 | 12 |
| Flamengo (loan) | 2017 | Série A | 0 | 0 | 3 | 0 | 0 | 0 | 1 | 0 | — | | 4 | 0 |
| Flamengo (loan) | Total | | 45 | 3 | 39 | 16 | 9 | 3 | 4 | 1 | — | | 97 | 23 |
| Internacional (loan) | 2017 | Série B | 9 | 1 | — | | 2 | 0 | — | | — | | 11 | 1 |
| Al Nasr (loan) | 2017–18 | UAE Pro-League | 19 | 10 | — | | 6 | 3 | — | | — | | 25 | 13 |
| Chongqing Lifan | 2020 | Chinese Super League | 16 | 5 | — | | 0 | 0 | — | | — | | 16 | 5 |
| Bahia | 2021 | Série A | 0 | 0 | — | | — | | — | | — | | 0 | 0 |
| Bahia | 2022 | Série B | 0 | 0 | 4 | 0 | 0 | 0 | — | | 4 (Note: Appearance(s) in Copa do Nordeste) | 2 | 8 | 2 |
| Bahia | Total | | 0 | 0 | 4 | 0 | 0 | 0 | — | | 4 | 2 | 8 | 2 |
| Athletico Paranaense | 2022 | Série A | 11 | 0 | — | | 1 | 0 | 5 | 0 | — | | 17 | 0 |
| Athletico Paranaense | 2023 | Série A | 4 | 0 | 0 | 0 | 0 | 0 | 0 | 0 | — | | 4 | 0 |
| Athletico Paranaense | Total | | 15 | 0 | 0 | 0 | 1 | 0 | 5 | 0 | — | | 21 | 0 |
| Operário Ferroviário | 2024 | Série B | 3 | 0 | 8 | 1 | 0 | 0 | 0 | 0 | — | | 11 | 1 |
| PSS Sleman | 2024–25 | Liga 1 | 14 | 2 | — | | 0 | 0 | — | | — | | 14 | 2 |
| Career total | | | 291 | 67 | 69 | 20 | 41 | 9 | 30 | 3 | 6 | 3 | 437 | 102 |

== Honours ==
Athletico Paranaense

- Campeonato Paranaense: 2009
- Copa Sudamericana: 2018
- J.League Cup / Copa Sudamericana Championship: 2019
- Copa do Brasil: 2019

Individual

- Campeonato Brasileiro Série A Best Newcomer: 2013
