= Estádio Raulino de Oliveira =

Football stadium in Brazil

Coordinates: 22°30′30.01″S 44°05′48.94″W

- Estádio da Cidadania
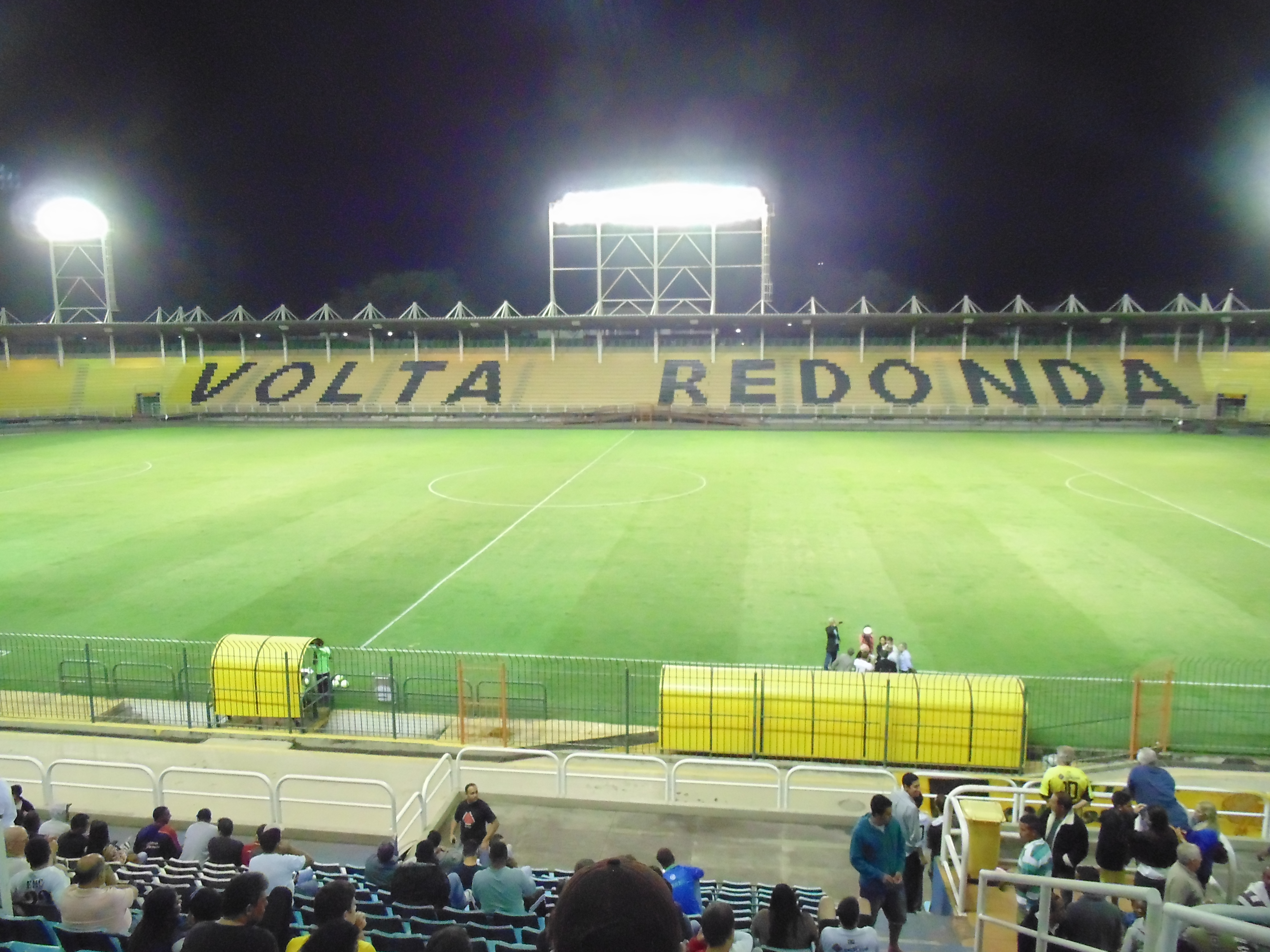
- Interactive map of Estádio Raulino de Oliveira
- Full name: Estádio Municipal General Sylvio Raulino de Oliveira
- Location: Volta Redonda, RJ, Brazil
- Owner: City of Volta Redonda
- Capacity: 18,230

Construction
- Built: 1976
- Opened: 14 March 1976

Tenant
- Volta Redonda

Estádio Municipal General Sylvio Raulino de Oliveira, also known as Raulino de Oliveira, and as Estádio da Cidadania, lit. 'Citizenship Stadium', is a football stadium. It was inaugurated on 14 March 1976 in Volta Redonda, Rio de Janeiro State, and has a maximum capacity of 20,255. The stadium is owned by the City Hall of Volta Redonda, and is the home ground of Volta Redonda Futebol Clube. Its formal name honors Raulino de Oliveira, former president of Companhia Siderúrgica Nacional, located in Volta Redonda.

== History ==
The stadium was built in 1976. It was inaugurated on 14 March of that year. The stadium bleachers were originally a metallic structure, but in August 2001, the stadium reformation started, and the metallic structure was replaced by a masonry structure. This expanded the stadium maximum capacity from 15,000 to 21,000.

The inaugural match was played on 14 March 1976, when Volta Redonda beat Botafogo 3–2. The first goal of the stadium was scored by Volta Redonda's Mauro.

The stadium's attendance record currently stands at 24.509, set on 1 May 1977 when Vasco beat Volta Redonda 1–0.

The stadium was also the home ground of Fluminense during the 2005 Campeonato Brasileiro, and of Flamengo and Fluminense for selected matches during the 2016 Campeonato Brasileiro.
