= Estádio Mário Helênio =

Multi-use stadium in Juiz de Fora, Brazil

Estádio Municipal Radialista Mário Helênio
- Estádio Mário Helênio; Estádio Municipal de Juiz de Fora
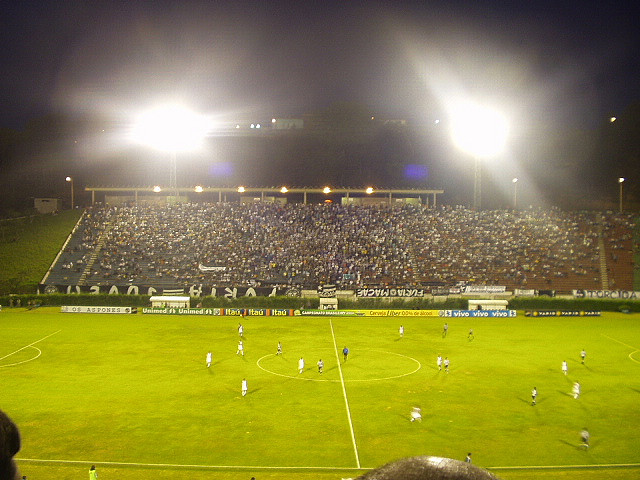
- Sisbrace
- Interactive map of Estádio Municipal Radialista Mário Helênio
- Location: Juiz de Fora, Brazil
- Coordinates: 21°47′15″S 43°22′41″W
- Owner: Juiz de Fora City Hall
- Capacity: 31,863
- Record attendance: 62,180 (30 October 1988)

Construction
- Built: 1988
- Opened: 30 October 1988

Tenant
- Tupi

Estádio Municipal Radialista Mário Helênio, also known as Estádio Mário Helênio, and as Estádio Municipal de Juiz de Fora, is a multi-use stadium in Juiz de Fora, Brazil. It is currently used mostly for football matches. The stadium has a maximum capacity of 31,863 people. It was built in 1988.

The stadium is owned by the Juiz de Fora City Hall. The stadium is named after the Juiz de Fora radio broadcaster Mário Helênio.

In the late 1980s and early 1990s, the stadium was used by the big clubs of Rio de Janeiro (Botafogo, Flamengo, Fluminense, and Vasco da Gama) due to the great number of supporters in the city.

== History ==
In 1988, the works on the stadium were completed. The inaugural match was played on October 30 of that year, when Sport Juiz de Fora beat Tupi 2–0. The first goal of the stadium was scored by Sport's André.

The stadium's attendance record stands at 62,180, set on October 30, 1988 when Sport Juiz De Fora and Tupi drew 2–0.

On December 2, 1989, at Estádio Radialista Mário Helênio, Zico played his last official match for Flamengo. Flamengo beat Fluminense 5–0.
