= Primeira Liga (Brazil) =

- Founded: 10 September 2015
- First season: 2016
- Folded: 2017
- Country: Brazil
- Region: Brazil's South Region, Ceará, Minas Gerais and Rio de Janeiro state
- Number of clubs: 16
- Broadcaster(s): SporTV (live matches)
- Website: Official site

Primeira Liga (First League), also known as Liga Sul-Minas-Rio (South-Minas-Rio League) or Copa Sul-Minas-Rio (South-Minas-Rio Cup), was a Brazilian football competition contested between Brazil's South Region, Ceará, Minas Gerais and Rio de Janeiro state teams. This competition is a successor tournament to the Copa Sul-Minas.

== History ==
The competition was founded in 2015 by clubs that were unhappy with the state championships and their low attendances and revenues. The first edition was played in 2016. The tournament went on hiatus for 2018, before being officially cancelled the following year.

== List of champions ==
List of Primeira Liga finals
Year	Winners	Score	Runners-up	Venue	Losing semi-finalists^{1}
2016	(Rio de Janeiro (state)) Fluminense	1–0	(Paraná (state)) Atlético Paranaense	Juiz de Fora	(Rio de Janeiro (state)) Flamengo and (Rio Grande do Sul) Internacional
2017	(Paraná (state)) Londrina	0–0	(Minas Gerais) Atlético Mineiro	Londrina	(Minas Gerais) Cruzeiro and (Paraná (state)) Paraná
2017	Londrina won 4–2 in a penalty shoot-out.				

== See also ==
- Copa Sul Minas
