= 2015 CR Flamengo season =

Flamengo
2015 season
- Chairman: Eduardo Bandeira de Mello
- Manager: Vanderlei Luxemburgo (until 25 May); Jayme de Almeida (caretaker, 26-28 May); Cristóvão Borges (28 May - 20 August); Oswaldo de Oliveira (from 20 August)
- Série A: 12th
- Campeonato Carioca: 3rd
- Copa do Brasil: Round of 16
- Top goalscorer: League: Alan Patrick (7 goals); All: Alecsandro; Marcelo Cirino (11 each)
- Average home league attendance: 31,502
Home colours	Away colours	Third colours

The 2015 season is the 120th year in the club's history, the 104th season in Clube de Regatas do Flamengo's football existence, and their 45th in the Brazilian Série A, having never been relegated from the top division.

This season Flamengo did not participate in continental competition, failing to qualify for either the Copa Libertadores or Copa Sudamericana based on the previous season's performance.

== Kits ==
Home	Home alternate	Away	Away alternate	Third	Third alternate	Goalkeeper	Goalkeeper alternate

== Club ==
=== First-team squad ===
As of 7 December 2015

Note: Flags indicate national team as defined under FIFA eligibility rules; some limited exceptions apply. Players may hold more than one non-FIFA nationality.

No.	Pos.	Nation	Player
2	DF	COL	Pablo Armero
3	DF	BRA	César Martins
4	DF	BRA	Samir
7	FW	BRA	Marcelo Cirino
8	MF	BRA	Márcio Araújo
9	FW	PER	Paolo Guerrero
10	MF	BRA	Ederson
11	FW	QAT	Emerson
13	DF	BRA	Marcelo (on loan from Cianorte)
14	DF	BRA	Wallace (captain)
15	MF	BRA	Luiz Antônio
17	MF	BRA	Gabriel
18	MF	BRA	Jonas
19	MF	BRA	Alan Patrick (on loan from Shakhtar Donetsk)
20	MF	ARG	Héctor Canteros

No.	Pos.	Nation	Player
21	DF	BRA	Pará (on loan from Grêmio)
22	MF	BRA	Éverton
25	MF	BRA	Matheus Trinidade
26	FW	BRA	Paulinho
27	FW	BRA	Kayke
30	MF	BRA	Matheus Sávio
31	FW	BRA	Douglas Baggio
32	DF	BRA	Ayrton (on loan from Palmeiras)
33	MF	BRA	Ronaldo
34	DF	BRA	Rafael Dumas
35	MF	BRA	Jajá
36	DF	BRA	Jorge
37	GK	BRA	César
40	FW	BRA	Thiago Santos
48	GK	BRA	Paulo Victor

== Transfers ==
=== In ===
Date	Pos.	Name	From	Fee
1 January 2015	DF	(Brazil) Thallyson	(Brazil) ASA	
21 January 2015	MF	(Brazil) Jonas	(Brazil) Sampaio Corrêa	€330k
16 June 2015	FW	(Qatar) Emerson	(Brazil) Corinthians	Free
16 June 2015	FW	(Peru) Paolo Guerrero	(Brazil) Corinthians	Free
21 July 2015	MF	(Brazil) Ederson	(Italy) Lazio	Free
10 August 2015	FW	(Brazil) Kayke	(Brazil) ABC	€180k

=== Out ===
Date	Pos.	Name	To	Fee
1 January 2015	DF	(Brazil) Digão	Released	
1 January 2015	MF	(Brazil) Guilherme Camacho	(Brazil) Guaratinguetá	Free
9 January 2015	FW	(Brazil) Negueba	(Brazil) Coritiba	Free
16 January 2015	FW	(Brazil) Chicão	(Brazil) Bahia	Free
27 January 2015	GK	(Brazil) Felipe	Released	
5 March 2015	DF	(Brazil) Léo Moura	(United States) Fort Lauderdale Strikers	Free
1 June 2015	MF	(Brazil) Val	Released	
10 June 2015	FW	(Brazil) Alecsandro	(Brazil) Palmeiras	Free
1 July 2015	GK	(Brazil) João Kuspiosz	(Portugal) São Martinho	Undisclosed
12 July 2015	FW	(Croatia) Eduardo da Silva	(Ukraine) Shakhtar Donetsk	Free
22 August 2015	MF	(Paraguay) Víctor Cáceres	(Qatar) Al-Rayyan	€883k

=== Loans in ===
Date from	Date to	Pos.	Name	From
1 January 2015	1 August 2015	MF	(Brazil) Arthur Maia	(Brazil) Vitória
1 January 2015	10 August 2015	DF	(Brazil) Bressan	(Brazil) Grêmio
5 January 2015	23 April 2017	FW	(Brazil) Marcelo Cirino	(Brazil) Atlético Paranaense
5 January 2015	31 December 2015	DF	(Brazil) Pará	(Brazil) Grêmio
10 April 2015	31 December 2015	DF	(Colombia) Pablo Armero	(Italy) Udinese
14 April 2015	31 December 2015	MF	(Brazil) Almir	(Brazil) Bangu
11 June 2015	31 December 2015	DF	(Brazil) Ayrton	(Brazil) Palmeiras
17 July 2015	30 June 2016	DF	(Brazil) César Martins	(Portugal) Benfica

=== Loans out ===
Date from	Date to	Pos.	Name	From
1 July 2015	30 November 2015	DF	(Brazil) Thallyson	(Brazil) Fortaleza
6 July 2015	30 June 2016	MF	(Argentina) Lucas Mugni	(Argentina) Newell's Old Boys
31 August 2015	30 June 2016	DF	(Brazil) Anderson Pico	(Ukraine) Dnipro
10 September 2015	8 December 2015	DF	(Brazil) Rodrigo Frauches	(Brazil) Macaé

== Friendlies ==
=== Super Series ===
Prior to the beginning of the Campeonato Carioca, Flamengo participated in a friendly tournament against São Paulo and Vasco da Gama in the Arena da Amazônia.

Pos	Team	Pld	W	PKW	PKL	L	GF	GA	GD	Pts	Final result
1	Flamengo (C)	2	2	0	0	0	2	0	+2	6	Super Series champions
2	São Paulo	2	1	0	0	1	2	2	0	3	
3	Vasco da Gama	2	0	0	0	2	1	3	−2	0	

Source: Super Series
(C) Champion

21 January 2015 Super Series	Flamengo	1–0	Vasco da Gama	Manaus
22:00 UTC−03:00	Éverton 53'	Report		Stadium: Arena da Amazônia; Attendance: 21,915; Referee: Edmar Campos da Encarnação

25 January 2015 Super Series	São Paulo	0–1	Flamengo	Manaus
17:00 UTC−03:00		Report	Samir 77'	Stadium: Arena da Amazônia; Attendance: 23,973; Referee: Antonio Carlos Pequeno Frutuoso

=== Other friendlies ===
Aside from the Super Series, Flamengo participated in a number of other friendlies, including a match against Ukrainian club Shahktar Donetsk in Brasília and a send-off match against Nacional for Léo Moura after ten years with Flamengo. The club also played against Icasa just before the start of the Brasileirão season, and two other matches during pauses in the Brasileirão season for 2018 World Cup qualifying matches.

In commemoration of Flamengo's 120th anniversary, they played a friendly in the Maracanã against MLS club Orlando City on 15 November.

18 January 2015 Friendly	Flamengo (Brazil)	0–0	(Ukraine) Shakhtar Donetsk	Brasília
17:00 UTC−03:00		Report		Stadium: Estádio Nacional Mané Garrincha; Attendance: 26,011

4 March 2015 Friendly	Flamengo (Brazil)	2–0	(Uruguay) Nacional	Rio de Janeiro
22:00 UTC−03:00	Eduardo 19'; Matheus Sávio 51'	Report		Stadium: Maracanã; Attendance: 30,620; Referee: Luiz Flávio de Oliveira

2 May 2015 Friendly	Icasa	0–1	Flamengo	Juazeiro do Norte
19:30 UTC−03:00		Report	Gabriel 66'	Stadium: Estádio Mauro Sampaio; Referee: Marcos Guedes

11 October 2015 Friendly	Desportiva Ferroviária	0–4	Flamengo	Cariacica
16:00 UTC−03:00		Report	César Martins 18'; Emerson 22' (pen.); Matheus Sávio 53'; Douglas Baggio 65'	Stadium: Estádio Kléber Andrade; Attendance: 17,511; Referee: Marcos André Gomes

15 November 2015 Friendly	Flamengo (Brazil)	1–0	(United States) Orlando City	Rio de Janeiro
	Luiz Antônio 67'	Report		Stadium: Maracanã; Attendance: 12,371

=== Overall ===
Competition	First match	Last match	Starting round	Final position	Record							
Competition	First match	Last match	Starting round	Final position	Pld	W	D	L	GF	GA	GD	Win %
Campeonato Carioca	31 January 2015	19 April 2015	Matchday 1	Semi-Finals	17	11	4	2	31	10	+21	64.71
Campeonato Brasileiro Série A	10 May 2015	6 December 2015	Matchday 1	12th	38	15	4	19	45	53	−8	39.47
Copa do Brasil	25 February 2015	26 August 2015	First stage	Round of 16	7	4	2	1	10	4	+6	57.14
Total					62	30	10	22	86	67	+19	48.39

Source: Competitions

== Competitions ==
=== Campeonato Carioca ===
Like the previous edition, the 2015 Campeonato Carioco was organized as a single table, called the Taça Guanabara, with the top four teams qualifying for the semifinals.

==== Taça Guanabara ====
Pos	Team	Pld	W	D	L	GF	GA	GD	Pts	Qualification or relegation
1	Botafogo	15	11	3	1	31	9	+22	36	Taça Guanabara champions and Semifinals
2	Flamengo	15	11	3	1	31	9	+22	36	Advanced in Semifinals
3	Vasco da Gama (C)	15	10	3	2	31	13	+18	33	Advanced in Semifinals
4	Fluminense	15	10	1	4	29	15	+14	31	Advanced in Semifinals
5	Madureira	15	9	3	3	26	12	+14	30	

(C) Champions

==== Matches ====
31 January 2015 1	Macaé	1–1	Flamengo	Macaé
19:30 UTC−03:00	Pipico 43'	[ Report]	Alecsandro 58'	Stadium: Moacyrzão; Attendance: 14,550; Referee: Rodrigo Carvalhes de Miranda

4 February 2015 2	Flamengo	4–0	Barra Mansa	Rio de Janeiro
22:00 UTC−03:00	Marcelo Cirino 23', 53'; Arthur Maia 41'; Canteros 88'	[ Report]		Stadium: Maracanã; Attendance: 14,443; Referee: Alexandre Vargas Tavares de Jesus

7 February 2015 3	Resende	1–2	Flamengo	Volta Redonda
19:30 UTC−03:00	Anderson Pico 75' (o.g.)	[ Report]	Anderson Pico 62'; Alecsandro 72' (pen.)	Stadium: Raulino de Oliveira; Attendance: 7,075; Referee: Grazianni Maciel Rocha

11 February 2015 4	Flamengo	5–1	Cabofriense	Rio de Janeiro
22:00 UTC−03:00	Marcelo Cirino 25'; Éverton 55'; Samir 58'; Eduardo 77'; Alecsandro 88'	[ Report]	Sassá 48'	Stadium: Maracanã; Attendance: 11,512; Referee: João Batista de Arruda

19 February 2015 5	Flamengo	2–0	Boavista	Rio de Janeiro
19:30 UTC−03:00	Marcelo Cirino 56'; Éverton 72'	[ Report]		Stadium: Maracanã; Attendance: 24,219; Referee: Bruno Arleu Araújo

22 February 2015 6	Madureira	1–1	Flamengo	Volta Redonda
16:00 UTC−03:00	Luiz Paulo 35'	[ Report]	Bressan 74'	Stadium: Raulino de Oliveira; Attendance: 7,252; Referee: Wagner do Nascimento Magalhães

1 March 2015 7	Botafogo	1–0	Flamengo	Rio de Janeiro
16:00 UTC−03:00	Tomas 83'	[ Report]		Stadium: Maracanã; Attendance: 49,833; Referee: Péricles Bassols Pegado Cortez

7 March 2015 8	Flamengo	2–0	Friburguense	Rio de Janeiro
16:00 UTC−03:00	Marcelo Cirino 6', 31'	[ Report]		Stadium: Estádio Olímpico Nilton Santos; Attendance: 7,916; Referee: Carlos Eduardo Nunes Braga

11 March 2015 9	Flamengo	2–1	Volta Redonda	Rio de Janeiro
22:00 UTC−03:00	Paulinho 56'; Alecsandro 85'	[ Report]	Henrique 19'	Stadium: Maracanã; Attendance: 7,978; Referee: Pathrice Wallace Maia

14 March 2015 10	Tigres do Brasil	1–3	Flamengo	Duque de Caxias
19:30 UTC−03:00	Fabiano Oliveira 64'	[ Report]	Alecsandro 22'; Marcelo Cirino 65', 79'	Stadium: Estádio de Los Larios; Attendance: 5,088; Referee: Philip George Bennett

22 March 2015 11	Flamengo	2–1	Vasco da Gama	Rio de Janeiro
18:30 UTC−03:00	Alecsandro 17', 53' (pen.)	[ Report]	Gilberto 26'	Stadium: Maracanã; Attendance: 56,020; Referee: João Batista de Arruda

25 March 2015 12	Flamengo	2–1	Bangu	Rio de Janeiro
22:00 UTC−03:00	Alecsandro 51'; Pará 54'	[ Report]	Almir 73'	Stadium: Maracanã; Attendance: 6,084; Referee: Rodrigo Carvalhães de Miranda

28 March 2015 13	Bonsucesso	0–2	Flamengo	Rio de Janeiro
16:00 UTC-03:00		[ Report]	Marcelo Cirino 17'; Matheus Sávio 76'	Stadium: Estádio Olímpico Nilton Santos; Attendance: 5,707; Referee: Leonardo Garcia Cavaleiro

5 April 2015 14	Flamengo	3–0	Fluminense	Rio de Janeiro
18:30 UTC−03:00	Jonas 17'; Alecsandro 55'; Matheus Sávio 87'	[ Report]		Stadium: Maracanã; Attendance: 46,080; Referee: Wagner do Nascimento Magalhães

8 April 2015 15	Nova Iguaçu	0–0	Flamengo	Macaé
22:00 UTC-03:00		[ Report]		Stadium: Moacyrzão; Attendance: 4,020; Referee: Grazianni Maciel Rocha

=== Semifinals ===
12 April 2015 First leg	Vasco da Gama	0–0	Flamengo	Rio de Janeiro
16:00 UTC-03:00		[ Report]		Stadium: Maracanã; Attendance: 24,747; Referee: João Batista de Arruda

19 April 2015 Second leg	Flamengo	0–1 (0–1 agg.)	Vasco da Gama	Rio de Janeiro
16:00 UTC-03:00		[ Report]	Gilberto 61' (pen.)	Stadium: Maracanã; Attendance: 53,154; Referee: Rodrigo Nunes de Sá

=== Copa do Brasil ===
Flamengo entered the Copa do Brasil in the First Round via claiming the championship in the 2014 Campeonato Carioca. The draw was held on 16 December 2014. A second draw by CBF for the Round of 16 and onward was held on 4 August.

==== First round ====
25 February 2015 First leg	Brasil de Pelotas	1–2	Flamengo	Pelotas
22:00	Nena 90+1'	[ Report]	Alecsandro 29'; Pará 74'	Stadium: Estádio Bento Freitas; Attendance: 9,130; Referee: Vinícius Furlan

18 March 2015 Second leg	Flamengo	2–0 (4–1 agg.)	Brasil de Pelotas	Rio de Janeiro
22:00	Paulinho 70'; Eduardo 90+2'	[ Report]		Stadium: Maracanã; Attendance: 10,195; Referee: Rodolpho Toski Marques

==== Second round ====
22 April 2015 First leg	Salgueiro	0–2	Flamengo	Salgueiro
22:00		[ Report]	Arthur Maia 39'; Marcelo Cirino 48'	Stadium: Estádio Cornélio de Barros; Attendance: 7,553; Referee: Guilherme Ceretta de Lima

Flamengo won by at least 2 goals in the stadium of the opposing team, qualifying directly to the next round without the need to play a second leg.

==== Third round ====
27 May 2015 First leg	Flamengo	1–1	Náutico	Rio de Janeiro
22:00	Wallace 42'	[ Report]	Douglas 77'	Stadium: Maracanã; Attendance: 7,001; Referee: Francisco Carlos Nascimento

15 June 2015 Second leg	Náutico	0–2 (1–3 agg.)	Flamengo	São Lourenço da Mata
22:00		[ Report]	Jorge 50'; Guerrero 76'	Stadium: Arena Pernambuco; Attendance: 14,919; Referee: Cláudio Francisco Lima e Silva

==== Round of 16 ====
19 August 2015 First leg	Flamengo	0–1	Vasco da Gama	Rio de Janeiro
22:00		[ Report]	Jorge Henrique 58'	Stadium: Maracanã; Attendance: 38,844; Referee: Ricardo Marques

26 August 2015 Second leg	Vasco da Gama	1–1 (2–1 agg.)	Flamengo	Rio de Janeiro
22:00	Rafael Silva 80'	[ Report]	Mádson 5' (o.g.)	Stadium: Maracanã; Attendance: 49,367; Referee: Wilton Pereira Sampaio

=== Série A ===
==== League table ====
Pos	Team	Pld	W	D	L	GF	GA	GD	Pts	Qualification or relegation
10	Atlético Paranaense	38	14	9	15	43	48	−5	51	2016 Copa Sudamericana second stage (Note: Teams will enter in the 2016 Copa Sudamericana if they do not reach the 2016 Copa do Brasil round of 16. Also, the 2015 Copa Verde champion (Cuiabá) and the 2016 Copa do Nordeste champion have a guaranteed berth.)
11	Ponte Preta	38	13	12	13	41	40	+1	51	2016 Copa Sudamericana second stage
12	Flamengo	38	15	4	19	45	53	−8	49	2016 Copa Sudamericana second stage
13	Fluminense	38	14	5	19	40	49	−9	47	2016 Copa Sudamericana second stage
14	Chapecoense	38	12	11	15	34	44	−10	47	2016 Copa Sudamericana second stage

Source: Soccerway.com
Rules for classification: 1) points; 2) wins; 3) goal difference; 4) goals scored; 5) head-to-head results; 6) least red cards received; 7) least yellow cards received; 8) draw.

==== Matches ====
10 May 2015 1	São Paulo	2–1	Flamengo	São Paulo
16:00	Luís Fabiano 73'; Pato 79'	Report	Everton 85' (pen.)	Stadium: Morumbi; Attendance: 13,656; Referee: Marcelo de Lima Henrique

17 May 2015 2	Flamengo	2–2	Sport Recife	Rio de Janeiro
16:00	Canteros 73'; Everton 85'	Report	Souza 45+1' (pen.); Elber 68'	Stadium: Maracanã; Attendance: 34,459; Referee: Dewson Fernando Freitas da Silva

24 May 2015 3	Avaí	2–1	Flamengo	Florianópolis
16:00	Hugo 46', 62'	Report	Gabriel 50'	Stadium: Ressacada; Attendance: 11,868; Referee: Raphael Claus

31 May 2015 4	Flamengo	2–3	Fluminense	Rio de Janeiro
18:30	Alecsandro 36'; Eduardo 85'	Report	Fred 7' (pen.), 46'; Pará 32' (o.g.)	Stadium: Maracanã; Attendance: 28,663; Referee: Sandro Meira Ricci

3 June 2015 5	Cruzeiro	1–0	Flamengo	Belo Horizonte
22:00	Manoel 77'	Report		Stadium: Mineirão; Attendance: 12,071; Referee: Luiz Flávio de Oliveira

6 June 2015 6	Flamengo	1–0	Chapecoense	Rio de Janeiro
18:30	Gabriel 64'	Report		Stadium: Maracanã; Attendance: 20,156; Referee: Anderson Daronco

13 June 2015 7	Coritiba	0–1	Flamengo	Curitiba
16:30		Report	Eduardo 38'	Stadium: Couto Pereira; Attendance: 12,043; Referee: Guilherme Ceretta de Lima

20 June 2015 8	Flamengo	0–2	Atlético Mineiro	Rio de Janeiro
16:20		Report	Samir 21' (o.g.); Pratto 40'	Stadium: Maracanã; Attendance: 42,318; Referee: Thiago Duarte Peixoto

28 June 2015 9	Vasco da Gama	1–0	Flamengo	Cuiabá
18:30	Riascos 15'	Report		Stadium: Arena Pantanal; Attendance: 16,602; Referee: Héber Roberto Lopes

1 July 2015 10	Joinville	0–1	Flamengo	Joinville
22:00		Report	Emerson 55'	Stadium: Arena Joinville; Attendance: 15,728; Referee: Leandro Pedro Vuaden

5 July 2015 11	Flamengo	1–2	Figueirense	Rio de Janeiro
18:30	Alan Patrick 48'	Report	Ricardinho 61'; Fabinho 90+2'	Stadium: Maracanã; Attendance: 20,769; Referee: Jailson Macêdo Freitas

8 July 2015 12	Internacional	1–2	Flamengo	Porto Alegre
22:00	Ernando 90+2'	Report	Guerrero 10'; Everton 65'	Stadium: Beira-Rio; Attendance: 10,937; Referee: Wilton Pereira Sampaio

12 July 2015 13	Flamengo	0–3	Corinthians	Rio de Janeiro
16:00		Report	Elias 26'; Uendel 45+3'; Jádson 63'	Stadium: Maracanã; Attendance: 29,872; Referee: Leandro Pedro Vuaden

18 July 2015 14	Flamengo	1–0	Grêmio	Rio de Janeiro
18:30	Guerrero 40'	Report		Stadium: Maracanã; Attendance: 51,055; Referee: Ricardo Marques Ribeiro

26 July 2015 15	Goiás	0–1	Flamengo	Goiânia
16:00		Report	Marcelo Cirino 73'	Stadium: Serra Dourada; Attendance: 11,297; Referee: Héber Roberto Lopes

2 August 2015 16	Flamengo	2–2	Santos	Rio de Janeiro
16:00	Alan Patrick 39'; Emerson 41'	Report; Borderô	Oliveira 51'; Lima 72'	Stadium: Maracanã; Attendance: 61,421; Referee: Anderson Daronco

9 August 2015 17	Ponte Preta	1–0	Flamengo	Campinas
16:00	Pablo 70'	Report		Stadium: Moisés Lucarelli; Attendance: 11,694; Referee: Jailson Macêdo Freitas

12 August 2015 18	Flamengo	3–2	Atlético Paranaense	Rio de Janeiro
19:30	Wallace 11'; Emerson 39'; Alan Patrick 44'	Report	Hernani 24'; Kadu 65'	Stadium: Maracanã; Attendance: 20,881; Referee: Marcelo Aparecido Ribeiro de Souza

16 August 2015 19	Palmeiras	4–2	Flamengo	São Paulo
11:00	Jackson 5'; Samir 58' (o.g.); Dudu 65'; Alecsandro 70'	Report	Ederson 50', 56'	Stadium: Allianz Parque; Attendance: 37,739; Referee: Igor Junio Benevenuto

23 August 2015 20	Flamengo	2–1	São Paulo	Rio de Janeiro
16:00	Ederson 42'; Guerrero 47'	Report	Luiz Eduardo 36'	Stadium: Maracanã; Attendance: 42,954; Referee: Anderson Daronco

30 August 2015 21	Sport Recife	0–1	Flamengo	São Lourenço da Mata
16:00		Report	Everton 5'	Stadium: Itaipava Arena Pernambuco; Attendance: 30,446; Referee: Bráulio da Silva Machado

2 September 2015 22	Flamengo	3–0	Avaí	Natal
21:00	Alan Patrick 30'; Kayke 55', 76'	Report		Stadium: Arena das Dunas; Attendance: 22,825; Referee: Thiago Duarte Peixoto

6 September 2015 23	Fluminense	1–3	Flamengo	Rio de Janeiro
16:00	Jean 57' (pen.)	Report	Emerson 10'; Kayke 14'; Paulinho 68'	Stadium: Maracanã; Attendance: 55,999; Referee: Ricardo Marques Ribeiro

10 September 2015 24	Flamengo	2–0	Cruzeiro	Rio de Janeiro
21:00	Alan Patrick 45+1'; Luiz Antônio 68'	Report		Stadium: Maracanã; Attendance: 43,017; Referee: Marcelo Aparecido Ribeiro de Souza

13 September 2015 25	Chapecoense	1–3	Flamengo	Chapecó
16:00	Rangel 80' (pen.)	Report	Paulinho 10'; Canteros 32'; Kayke 88'	Stadium: Arena Condá; Attendance: 10,800; Referee: Anderson Daronco

17 September 2015 26	Flamengo	0–2	Coritiba	Brasília
21:00		Report	Kléber 9' (pen.); Almeida 25'	Stadium: Mané Garrincha; Attendance: 67,011; Referee: Marielson Alves Silva

20 September 2015 27	Atlético Mineiro	4–1	Flamengo	Belo Horizonte
16:00	Marcelo 15' (o.g.); Jemerson 26', 55'; Dátolo 70'	Report	Paulinho 18'	Stadium: Independência; Attendance: 20,203; Referee: Sandro Meira Ricci

27 September 2015 28	Flamengo	1–2	Vasco da Gama	Rio de Janeiro
16:00	Emerson 11'	Report	Rodrigo 57'; Nenê 61' (pen.)	Stadium: Maracanã; Attendance: 44,361; Referee: Leandro Pedro Vuaden

4 October 2015 29	Flamengo	2–0	Joinville	Rio de Janeiro
11:00	Ayrton 57'; Gabriel 81'	Report		Stadium: Maracanã; Attendance: 58,870; Referee: Luiz Flávio de Oliveira

14 October 2015 30	Figueirense	3–0	Flamengo	Florianópolis
22:00	Clayton 21', 65'; Dudu 88'	Report		Stadium: Orlando Scarpelli; Attendance: 12,820; Referee: Anderson Daronco

17 October 2015 31	Flamengo	0–1	Internacional	Rio de Janeiro
16:00		Report	Ernando 18'	Stadium: Maracanã; Attendance: 28,786; Referee: Héber Roberto Lopes

25 October 2015 32	Corinthians	1–0	Flamengo	São Paulo
17:00	Vágner Love 45+2'	Report		Stadium: Arena Corinthians; Attendance: 43,515; Referee: Wilton Pereira Sampaio

1 November 2015 33	Grêmio	2–0	Flamengo	Porto Alegre
17:00	Everton 51'; Bobô 84'			Stadium: Arena do Grêmio; Attendance: 37,793; Referee: Braulio da Silva Machado

8 November 2015 34	Flamengo	4–1	Goiás	Rio de Janeiro
17:00	Alan Patrick 18', 47'; Kayke 50', 63'	Report	Erik 45+1'	Stadium: Maracanã; Attendance: 15,421; Referee: Luiz Flavio de Oliveira

18 November 2015 35	Santos	0–0	Flamengo	Santos
22:00		Report		Stadium: Vila Belmiro; Attendance: 8,071; Referee: Heber Roberto Lopes

22 November 2015 36	Flamengo	1–1	Ponte Preta	Brasília
18:00	Gabriel 55'	Report	Diego 77'	Stadium: Mané Garrincha; Attendance: 12,814; Referee: Dewson Fernando Freitas da Silva

29 November 2015 37	Atlético Paranaense	3–0	Flamengo	Curitiba
19:30	Roberto 12'; Cleberson 32', 67'	Report		Stadium: Arena da Baixada; Attendance: 23,975; Referee: Marcelo Aparecido Ribeiro de Souza

6 December 2015 38	Flamengo	1–2	Palmeiras	Rio de Janeiro
17:00	Pará 75'	Report	Dudu 72'; Vitor Hugo 89'	Stadium: Maracanã; Attendance: 16,070; Referee: Wagner Reway

== Statistics ==
=== Appearances and goals ===
No.	Pos.	Name	Série A			Copa do Brasil			Carioca			Total		
No.	Pos.	Name	Apps	Starts	Goals	Apps	Starts	Goals	Apps	Starts	Goals	Apps	Starts	Goals
Goalkeepers
37	GK	(Brazil) César	14	14	0	2	2	0	2	2	0	18	18	0
48	GK	(Brazil) Paulo Victor	24	24	0	5	5	0	15	15	0	44	44	0
Defenders
3	DF	(Brazil) César Martins	20	18	0	1	1	0	0	0	0	21	19	0
4	DF	(Brazil) Samir	20	19	0	3	2	0	6	6	1	29	27	1
13	DF	(Brazil) Marcelo	11	8	0	2	2	0	5	5	0	18	15	0
14	DF	(Brazil) Wallace	28	28	1	6	6	1	14	14	0	48	38	2
21	DF	(Brazil) Pará	28	17	1	7	7	1	17	16	1	52	40	3
32	DF	(Brazil) Ayrton	13	9	1	0	0	0	0	0	0	13	9	1
36	DF	(Brazil) Jorge	22	22	0	4	4	1	1	0	0	27	26	1
	DF	(Colombia) Pablo Armero	4	4	0	1	1	0	0	0	0	5	5	0
	DF	(Brazil) Thallyson	0	0	0	0	0	0	5	3	0	5	3	0
Midfielders
8	MF	(Brazil) Márcio Araújo	33	30	0	7	5	0	16	15	0	56	50	0
10	MF	(Brazil) Ederson	8	2	3	2	2	0	0	0	0	10	4	3
15	MF	(Brazil) Luiz Antônio	14	6	1	2	0	0	10	4	0	26	10	1
17	MF	(Brazil) Gabriel	24	14	4	2	2	0	13	11	0	39	27	4
18	MF	(Brazil) Jonas	19	15	0	5	3	0	8	7	1	32	25	1
19	MF	(Brazil) Alan Patrick	26	22	7	0	0	0	0	0	0	26	22	7
20	MF	(Argentina) Héctor Canteros	34	30	2	6	6	0	13	13	1	53	49	3
22	MF	(Brazil) Éverton	33	32	4	4	4	0	10	7	2	47	43	6
	MF	(Brazil) Almir	7	2	0	2	1	0	0	0	0	9	3	0
Forwards
7	FW	(Brazil) Marcelo Cirino	21	10	1	5	3	1	17	17	9	43	30	11
9	FW	(Peru) Paolo Guerrero	15	14	3	3	3	1	0	0	0	18	17	4
11	FW	(Qatar) Emerson	22	22	5	3	3	0	0	0	0	25	25	5
26	FW	(Brazil) Paulinho	25	11	3	3	1	1	4	0	1	32	12	5
27	FW	(Brazil) Kayke	11	6	2	0	0	0	0	0	0	11	6	2
Players transferred out during the season
	FW	(Brazil) Alecsandro	4	4	1	4	3	1	15	9	9	23	16	11
	FW	(Croatia) Eduardo	9	4	2	3	1	1	9	3	1	21	8	4
	DF	(Brazil) Anderson Pico	4	4	0	2	2	0	13	13	1	19	19	1
	MF	(Brazil) Arthur Maia	5	1	0	4	2	1	9	5	1	18	8	2
	DF	(Brazil) Bressan	4	3	0	3	3	0	7	6	1	14	12	1
	MF	(Paraguay) Victor Cáceres	5	5	0	3	3	0	4	1	0	12	9	0
	MF	(Argentina) Lucas Mugni	1	0	0	1	0	0	5	3	0	7	3	0
	DF	(Brazil) Léo Moura	0	0	0	1	1	0	3	2	0	4	3	0
	DF	(Brazil) Rodrigo Frauches	1	0	0	0	0	0	3	2	0	4	2	0
Youth players with first-team appearances
30	MF	(Brazil) Matheus Sávio	1	0	0	1	0	0	4	0	2	6	0	2
33	MF	(Brazil) Ronaldo	1	0	0	0	0	0	0	0	0	1	0	0
35	MF	(Brazil) Jajá	5	3	0	1	0	0	1	0	0	7	3	0
	FW	(Brazil) Thiago Santos	1	0	0	0	0	0	0	0	0	1	0	0
	FW	(Brazil) Nixon	0	0	0	0	0	0	5	4	0	5	4	0
