= Barcelona Esportivo Capela =

Barcelona Capela
- Full name: Barcelona Esportivo Capela
- Nickname(s): Barça
- Founded: 20 January 2004; 21 years ago
- Ground: Rua Javari
- Capacity: 5,256
- President: Paulo Sérgio Moura
- Head Coach: João Paulo
- League: Campeonato Paulista Segunda Divisão
- 2024: Paulista Segunda Divisão, 17th of 17
Home colours	Away colours

Barcelona Esportivo Capela, commonly referred to as Barcelona Capela or simply Barcelona-SP, is a football club based in the Southern district of Capela do Socorro in São Paulo, Brazil. It competes in the Campeonato Paulista Segunda Divisão, the fourth tier of the São Paulo state football league.

The club was responsible to serve as the youth setup for notable players, such as Renato Abreu, Pará, Igor Rocha and mainly Diego Costa.
