= Diego Costa =

Spain international footballer (born 1988)

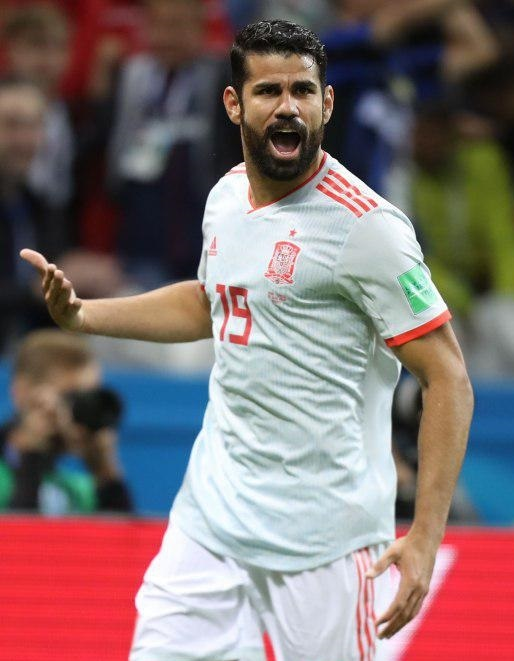
- Costa with Spain in 2018

Personal information
- Full name: Diego da Silva Costa
- Date of birth: 7 October 1988 (age 38)
- Place of birth: Lagarto, Sergipe, Brazil
- Height: 1.86 m (6 ft 1 in)
- Position: Striker

Youth career
- 2004–2006: Barcelona de Capela

Senior career*
Years	Team	Apps	(Gls)
2006	Braga	0	(0)
2006	→ Penafiel (loan)	13	(5)
2007–2009	Atlético Madrid	0	(0)
2007	→ Braga (loan)	6	(0)
2007–2008	→ Celta (loan)	30	(6)
2008–2009	→ Albacete (loan)	35	(10)
2009–2010	Valladolid	34	(8)
2010–2014	Atlético Madrid	94	(43)
2012	→ Rayo Vallecano (loan)	16	(10)
2014–2017	Chelsea	89	(52)
2017–2020	Atlético Madrid	61	(12)
2021–2022	Atlético Mineiro	15	(4)
2022–2023	Wolverhampton Wanderers	23	(1)
2023	Botafogo	12	(3)
2024	Grêmio	20	(7)
Total		448	(161)

International career
2013	Brazil	2	(0)
2014–2018	Spain	24	(10)
- * Club domestic league appearances and goals

Diego da Silva Costa (Note: Spanish: [ˈdjeɣo ða ˈsilβa ˈkosta] Brazilian Portuguese: [dʒiˈeɡu dɐ ˈsiwvɐ ˈkɔstɐ]) (born 7 October 1988) is a former professional footballer who played as a striker. Born in Brazil, he played for the Spain national team.

Costa began his career in his native Brazil before joining Braga in Portugal in 2006, aged 17. He never played for the club but spent time on loan at Penafiel, and signed with La Liga club Atlético Madrid the following year. Over the next two seasons, he had loan periods with Braga, Celta Vigo, and Albacete. His form earned him a move to fellow La Liga club Real Valladolid in 2009, where he spent one season, finishing as their top goalscorer, before returning to Atlético Madrid. Costa struggled to maintain a regular starting role with Atlético, and spent more time on loan, this time at Rayo Vallecano, where he finished as the club's highest scorer that season.

In 2011, Costa returned to Atlético with a greater role. He blossomed as a goalscorer and helped the team win a La Liga title, a Copa del Rey title, and a UEFA Super Cup, as well as reaching the 2014 UEFA Champions League final. In 2014, he was signed by Premier League club Chelsea in a deal worth €35 million (£32 million). In London, Costa won three trophies, including two Premier League titles and a League Cup. In 2018, following a rift with head coach Antonio Conte, Costa returned to Atlético Madrid in a club record transfer worth an initial €56 million, (Note: Costa's transfer equates to €65 million when performance-related add-ons are included. His title as club record transfer was surpassed later that summer, when Thomas Lemar joined for €60 million.) he won a UEFA Europa League title and another UEFA Super Cup as well as a second La Liga title in 2021. He ended his career in Brazil's Campeonato Brasileiro Série A with Atlético Mineiro, Botafogo and Grêmio, as well as a brief return to England with Wolverhampton Wanderers. He won a double of league and Copa do Brasil for Atlético Mineiro in 2021, and was top scorer as Grêmio won the Campeonato Gaúcho in 2024.

Costa is a dual citizen of Brazil and Spain. He played twice for Brazil in 2013, before declaring his desire to represent Spain, having been granted Spanish citizenship in September that year. He made his debut for Spain in March 2014 and has since won 24 caps and scored 10 goals, and has represented them at the 2014 and 2018 FIFA World Cups.

Known for his fiery temperament, Costa has been criticised and punished for several confrontations with opponents.

== Early life ==
Costa was born in Lagarto, Sergipe, Brazil, to parents José de Jesus and Josileide. His father named him in honour of Argentine footballer Diego Maradona despite the rivalry between the two nations, and he has an elder brother named Jair after Brazilian player Jairzinho. Despite regularly playing street football, Costa did not believe as a child that he would turn professional, in part due to the remote location of his hometown. He has since set up a football academy in his hometown, where he pays all the costs. Costa is a fan of Palmeiras.

Costa trialled unsuccessfully at his hometown team Atlético Clube Lagartense. At age 15, he left Sergipe and moved to São Paulo, to work in the store of his uncle Jarminho. Although he was never a professional, Jarminho had connections in football and recommended his nephew to Barcelona Esportivo Capela, a team from the south of the city set up as an alternative to drugs and gangs for youth of the favelas. Before joining this team, he had never been coached in football. He turned professional at the club, earning around £100 per month, and competed in the under-18 Taça de São Paulo despite a four-month ban for slapping an opponent and dissent towards the referee. Although he was sent off in the first game of the tournament, he attracted the attention of renowned Portuguese agent Jorge Mendes, who offered him a contract at Braga. Costa's father was apprehensive of sending his son to Europe, and suggested he instead sign for nearby Associação Desportiva São Caetano, but he was adamant that he would take the opportunity.

Jair played on the same team as Diego and was a slimmer, more technically able player, but had less focus; the two were often not fielded at the same time in order to prevent arguments. He never turned professional, but had a three-month trial at Basque club Salvatierra.

== Club career ==
=== Early career ===
Costa signed for his first European club in February 2006, Portugal's Braga. He initially struggled with loneliness and the comparatively cold weather of northern Portugal. Out of action due to the club's lack of a youth team, he was loaned that summer to Penafiel in the second division, managed by former Portugal international Rui Bento, who desired the "rough diamond".

Through his negotiations with Spain's Atlético Madrid, Mendes arranged Costa's transfer for €1.5 million and 50% of the player's rights in December 2006, but he remained on loan at Braga until the end of the season. Atlético defeated interest from Porto and Recreativo de Huelva for Costa's signature, with director Jesús García Pitarch admitting that it was a risk to pay so much for an inexperienced player. After 5 goals in 13 games for Penafiel, he was recalled to Braga in January 2007. On 23 February, he came on in the 71st minute for Zé Carlos and scored his first goal for the team, a last-minute goal for a 1–0 win at Parma to advance 2–0 on aggregate to the Last 16 of the UEFA Cup. His season ended after seven games due to a metatarsal injury which ruled him out for six months.

Costa was presented by Atlético Madrid president Enrique Cerezo on 10 July 2007 as "the new Kaká". While scout Javier Hernández wished for him to return to fitness in the club's reserves, García Pitarch instead suggested loaning Costa out immediately. He made his debut on 11 August in the Ciudad de Vigo tournament against Celta de Vigo, replacing Simão at half-time in a penalty shootout victory.

=== Celta Vigo ===
Later that month, Costa and Mario Suárez were loaned to Segunda División side Celta de Vigo for the season, and Costa became a regular in the team, managed by former Ballon d'Or winner Hristo Stoichkov. In his seventh league match, he scored his first goal in Spanish football in a dominant home victory over Xerez; after scoring, he showboated, causing a brawl which resulted in him being sent off. Costa was subsequently rested from Celta's away game against the same opposition. The event drew the wrath of Stoichkov, who unexpectedly left his position. Towards the middle of the season, he was involved in two further controversies: he struck Málaga defender Weligton in the head, causing an injury which required medical stitches, and was sent off against Sevilla Atlético for diving and dissent, leaving his team to fight for a draw without him. The loyal strike partner of Quincy Owusu-Abeyie despite the pair not sharing a common language, he was dropped for Cypriot Ioannis Okkas. On 23 March 2008, Costa scored both Celta goals in a 2–1 win at Numancia, the latter after a long dribble; but later on in the campaign, he was sent off against Tenerife at Balaídos, after which Celta went from winning 2–0 to drawing 2–2. The team barely avoided relegation, and Costa earned a reputation for being a disruptive influence.

=== Albacete ===
Despite earning a poor reputation for his conduct, Costa attracted interest from Salamanca, Gimnàstic de Tarragona and Málaga after his loan at Celta; García Pitarch ruled out any approach from the latter, fearing how Costa would behave on the Costa del Sol. After attending Atlético's pre-season tour of Mexico, he signed on loan for Albacete, also of Segunda División, on 22 August 2008, signing a contract which would have a lower fee depending on how many games he played. He initially threatened to terminate his deal with the Castile-La Mancha team, on account of the quality of his teammates and the city's lack of a beach. Nine days after signing, he scored a late winner in a 2–1 victory over Sevilla's reserves at the Estadio Carlos Belmonte. The Queso Mecánico suffered with financial problems during Costa's loan, with him threatening to strike unless their non-playing staff were paid in full. He was dropped to the bench by manager Juan Ignacio Martínez for the home game against Real Sociedad on 13 December as punishment for an argument with goalkeeper Jonathan, but came on as a substitute to score another late winner.

Costa was known for misbehaviour on and off the pitch while at Albacete. He was sent off to Tenerife, after which he slandered the referee's mother and confronted his opponents. He pulled practical jokes on his teammates and employers, earning him the moniker "that fucking Brazilian". However, he was a central figure as they avoided relegation, assisting twice in a 3–0 win at high-flying Rayo Vallecano on 2 May 2009, despite missing a penalty.

=== Valladolid ===
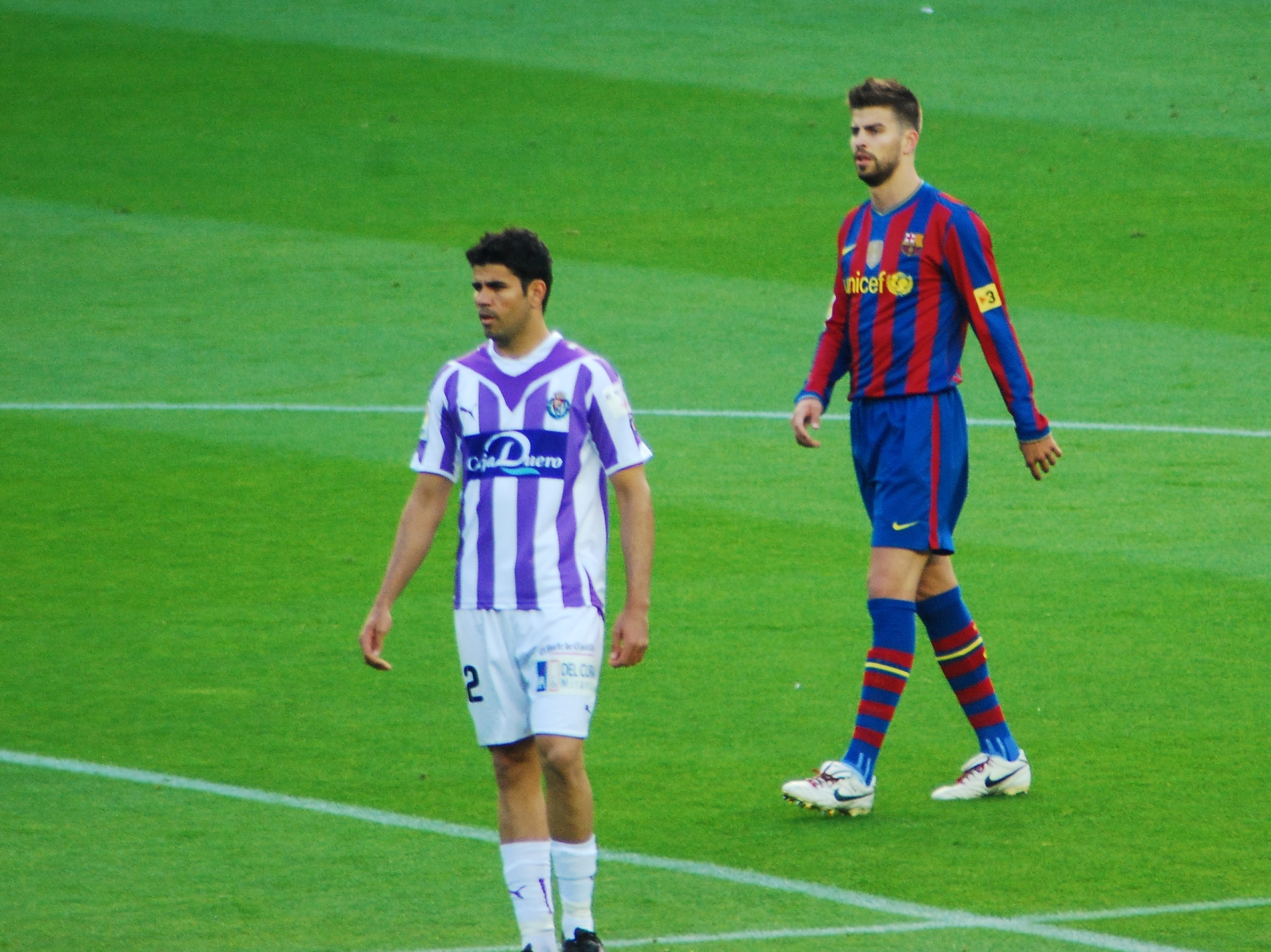
Diego Costa next to Gerard Piqué during an away Real Valladolid fixture versus FC Barcelona in May 2010

In the summer of 2009, Costa was desired by Barcelona for their reserve team, an approach which Atlético rejected, citing that he remained in their plans. Frustrated by his lack of opportunities, however, a now overweight Costa argued with his management and attempted to negotiate a move to Brazil's Esporte Clube Vitória.

On 8 July 2009, Costa was sold to Real Valladolid as part of the deal that sent goalkeeper Sergio Asenjo in the opposite direction, with the transfer including a €1 million buy-back option that could be activated by Atlético at the end of the season. García Pitarch confessed that there was a verbal agreement that Costa would definitely return at the end of the campaign, and that the deal had been made to look permanent in order to give Costa more commitment to his new club.

Initially, Costa had competition up front from fellow new signings Alberto Bueno and Manucho, signed from Real Madrid and Manchester United respectively; he eventually forged a friendship with the latter, a fellow lusophone from Angola. He started strong for the Castile and León side, scoring 6 times in his first 12 games, but only found the net once in the following five-and-a-half months as the campaign eventually ended in relegation from La Liga. He was sent off in a goalless draw against Espanyol on 24 March 2010 for a stamp on Dídac Vilà in the first half.

=== Atlético Madrid ===
==== 2010–13 ====
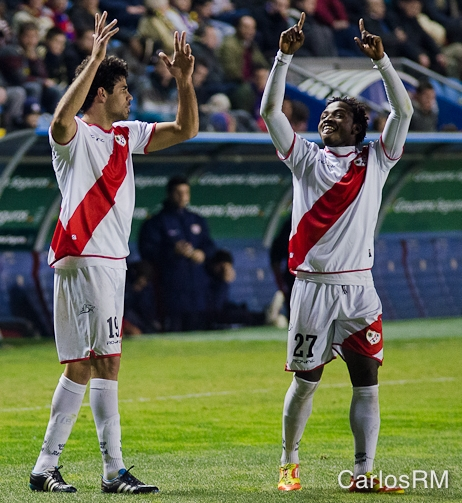
Costa on loan at Rayo Vallecano, celebrating with the goalscorer, Alhassane Bangoura, in a match against Levante, on 19 February 2012

In June 2010, Costa returned to the Colchoneros, initially as a backup to Sergio Agüero and Diego Forlán – Atlético also paid an undisclosed sum to Braga to buy all the residual 30% economic rights (the former also had to pay in excess of €833,000 in agent's fees to Gestifute). He was an unused substitute as Atlético won the 2010 UEFA Super Cup on 27 August.

On 26 September, with the injured Agüero on the substitutes bench, Costa scored the game's only goal at home against Real Zaragoza. On 3 April of the following year, already as a starter after manager Quique Sánchez Flores demoted Forlán from his position, Costa scored all of his team's goals in a 3–2 win at Osasuna.

In July 2011, during Atlético's pre-season, Costa suffered a serious knee injury, going on to miss the majority of the season. The injury prevented him from passing a medical at Turkish club Beşiktaş, having already agreed to transfer to them. On 23 January 2012, Costa was loaned to fellow league club Rayo Vallecano until June; he scored four goals in his first three appearances, including two in a 5–3 away win against Levante, eventually finishing his loan spell with 10 goals from 16 games.

For the second time in his career, Costa was an unused substitute as Atlético won the UEFA Super Cup on 1 September 2012. That December, Costa was involved in several on-field altercations in two separate matches. The first was in a 0–2 local derby loss against Real Madrid where he avoided disciplinary action after spitting incidents between him and Sergio Ramos. He was sent off in the following game at Viktoria Plzeň in the UEFA Europa League for headbutting opponent David Limberský, and was handed a four-match ban by UEFA. This, however, did not deter coach Diego Simeone from continuing to start him, and he responded by scoring three goals in two home contests, against Deportivo de La Coruña in the league (6–0) and Getafe in the season's Copa del Rey (3–0).

After the Copa del Rey semi-finals against Sevilla, Costa took his goal tally in the competition to seven in as many matches, having scored three times in the tie. In the first leg he scored two penalties in a 2–1 win and, in the second at the Ramón Sánchez Pizjuán, scored one after an individual effort and assisted Radamel Falcao in the other, also being involved in incidents which resulted in two opposing players – Gary Medel and Geoffrey Kondogbia – being sent off in the 2–2 draw.

Costa scored Atlético's equalising goal in the Copa del Rey final clash against city rivals Real Madrid on 17 May 2013, contributing to the 2–1 triumph – the first in 25 games in a streak stretching back to 1999 – and the tenth win in the tournament, confirmed by Miranda's extra-time header. He and opponent Cristiano Ronaldo had gone into the match as joint top scorers in the tournament, and thus Costa's eighth goal made him the top scorer.

==== 2013–14 season ====
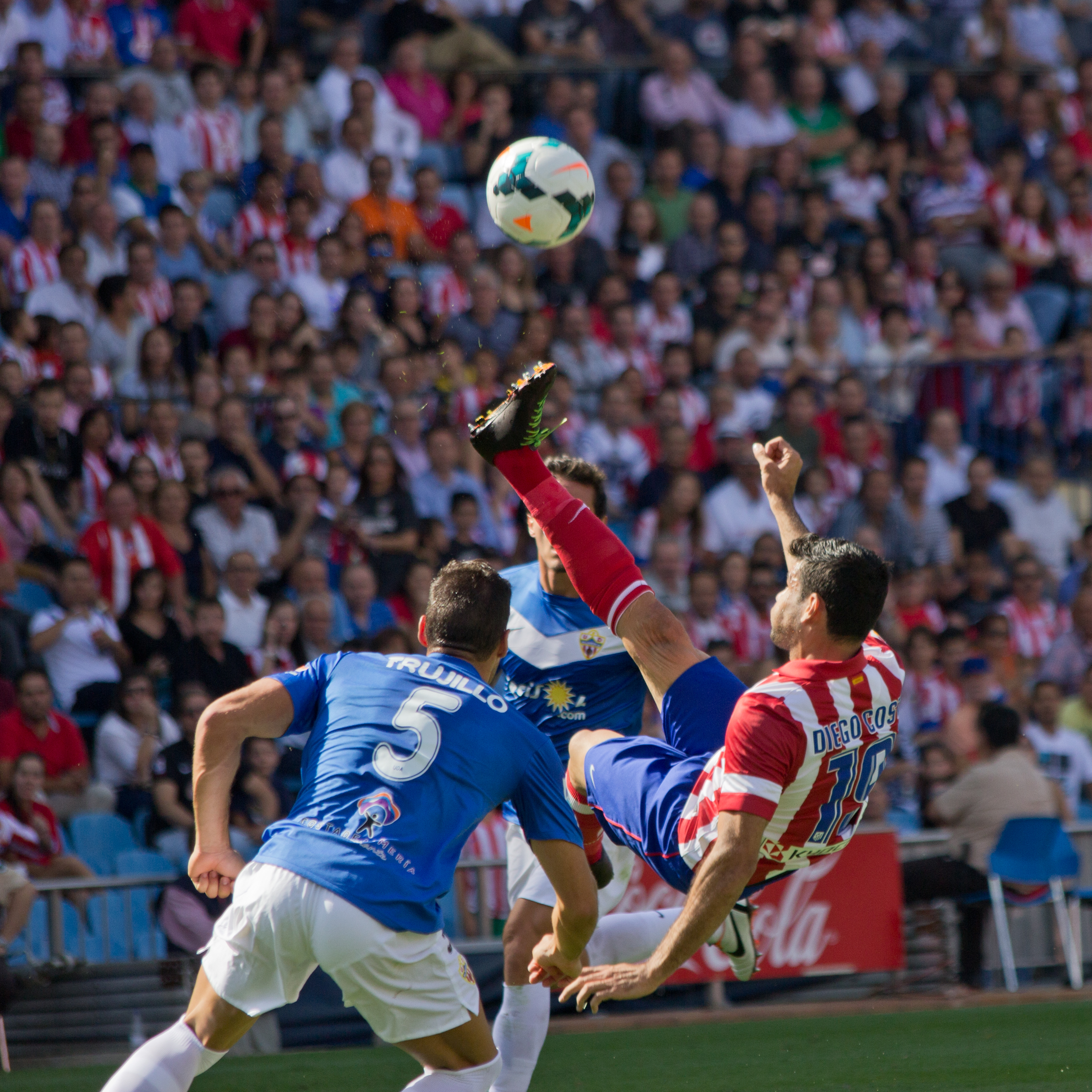
Costa executing an overhead kick against Almería, on 14 September 2013

In August 2013, Costa was heavily linked with a move to Liverpool, who allegedly matched his release clause of €25 million and offered him three times his salary at Atlético. Costa, however, chose to stay at the club and renewed his contract until 2018, while also doubling his wages; a few days after this, in the first match of the new season on 19 August, he scored a brace in a 3–1 win at Sevilla.

On 24 September, Costa scored both goals in a 2–1 home triumph over Osasuna to help his team stay level on points with league leaders Barcelona through six games. Four days later, in the Madrid derby, he scored the only goal of the game to record a second win over Real at the Santiago Bernabéu in under five months. For his performances, he was crowned the inaugural La Liga Player of the Month for September 2013. By his 25th birthday on 7 October, he had scored ten goals in eight league matches, equalling his tally from the previous season. All of those matches were won by Atlético, setting a new record for the best start to a season. On 23 November 2013, Costa scored an overhead volley from a cross by Gabi in a win over Getafe; the goal was nominated for the FIFA Puskás Award.

On 22 October 2013, Costa marked his UEFA Champions League debut with two goals against Austria Wien, the first coming after a fine individual effort in an eventual 3–0 group stage away win. On 19 February 2014, in the first knockout round's first leg, he scored the game's only goal at Milan, scoring seven minutes from time after a corner kick from Gabi; he added a further two in the second match, helping Atlético to a 4–1 victory that put them into the quarter-finals for the first time in 17 years.

On 30 April 2014, Costa won and converted a penalty in the second leg of the Champions League semi-final against Chelsea, as Atlético won 3–1 at Stamford Bridge and advanced to the final of the competition for the first time since 1974. He finished the league season with 27 league goals to become the third highest scorer, and the team won the title for the first time since 1996, but he was substituted after 16 minutes of the last match of the season against Barcelona due to a hamstring injury. Atlético sought to cure this injury before the upcoming Champions League final against Real Madrid by sending him to Belgrade for treatment with a horse placenta, and he was included in the starting line-up for the decisive match. However, he left the pitch after eight minutes in an eventual 1–4 loss; manager Diego Simeone later admitted a personal mistake in selecting the player to start the final despite his recent injury. Costa scored eight goals during the Champions League campaign, equalling the record held by Vavá since 1959 for most in a season by an Atlético player, and in his entire career was in the top ten Atlético players by goal average. At the season's LFP Awards, he was nominated for the league's Best Forward, losing out to Cristiano Ronaldo.

=== Chelsea ===
Having completed his medical in June, Chelsea announced on 1 July 2014 that they had agreed to meet the £32 million buy-out clause in Costa's contract. On 15 July, Chelsea confirmed the completion of the signing of Costa, who signed a five-year contract on a salary of £150,000 a week. On signing, Costa said, "I am very happy to sign for Chelsea. Everybody knows it is a big club in a very competitive league, and I am very excited to get started in England with a fantastic coach and teammates. Having played against Chelsea last season I know the high quality of the squad I am joining". Following the departure of former Chelsea striker Demba Ba, Costa inherited his number 19 shirt, the same number he wore at the 2014 World Cup for Spain and previously at Atlético.

==== 2014–15 season ====
Costa scored on his Chelsea debut on 27 July, running onto a through ball from Cesc Fàbregas in a 2–1 friendly win against Slovene club Olimpija. His first competitive match was Chelsea's first game of the league season, away to Burnley on 18 August, scoring the team's equaliser in a 3–1 victory. He scored in his third consecutive match on 30 August, the first and last goals of a 6–3 win at Everton, the first goal coming after 35 seconds. Costa was given the Premier League Player of the Month award for August 2014. He completed his first Premier League hat-trick in his fourth game of the season against Swansea City as Chelsea continued their perfect start to the season with a 4–2 win. With seven, Costa holds the record for most goals in his first four Premier League matches, surpassing the tally of six by both Sergio Agüero and Micky Quinn. In spite of his form at the start of the season, Costa had been suffering from a recurring hamstring problem which limited his participation in training; manager José Mourinho said that it would not heal until mid-November.

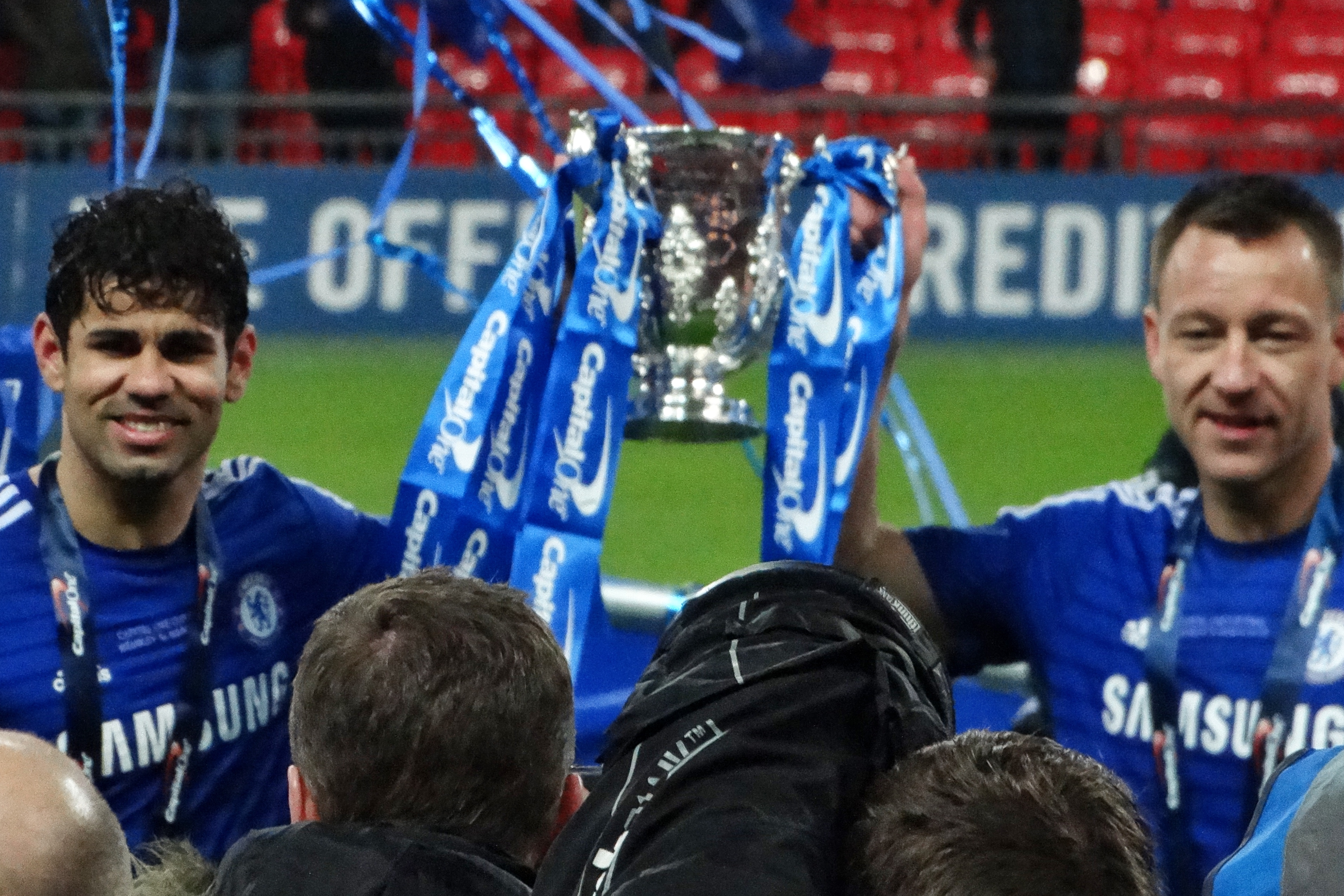
Goalscorers Costa and John Terry celebrating Chelsea's victory in the 2015 Football League Cup Final

Costa scored his tenth goal of the league season to give Chelsea a 2–1 win away to Liverpool on 8 November, preserving their unbeaten start to the campaign. In January, Costa was charged by the FA in relation to a stamp on Emre Can during Chelsea's win over Liverpool in the League Cup semi-finals, and was given a three-match ban. Costa won his first trophy for Chelsea on 1 March, as they defeated Tottenham Hotspur 2–0 to win the League Cup at Wembley Stadium; he scored the second goal of the game.

On 26 April, Costa was chosen as one of two forwards for the season's PFA Team of the Year, alongside Tottenham's Harry Kane. Five of Costa's Chelsea teammates were also in the selection. Due to injury, he was due to miss the remainder of the season, in which Chelsea won the league title with a 1–0 home win over Crystal Palace on 3 May. However, he featured in their last match of the season on the 24th, replacing the injured Didier Drogba after half an hour against Sunderland. Seven minutes later, he scored his 20th goal of the league campaign, an equalising penalty in an eventual 3–1 home win.

With reports speculating that Costa wanting to leave Chelsea, Costa affirmed on 2 June 2015 after Chelsea's post-season tour that he had no desire to leave London, saying, "It's always a bit more difficult in the first season for adaptation, but I have no reason to leave this place, I love it, the fans love me, and I want to stay. It's really good to come in the first season [to Chelsea] and win two things [the Premier League and the League Cup titles]. Next year I'll be ready to come back and, hopefully, win a couple more trophies."

==== 2015–16 season ====
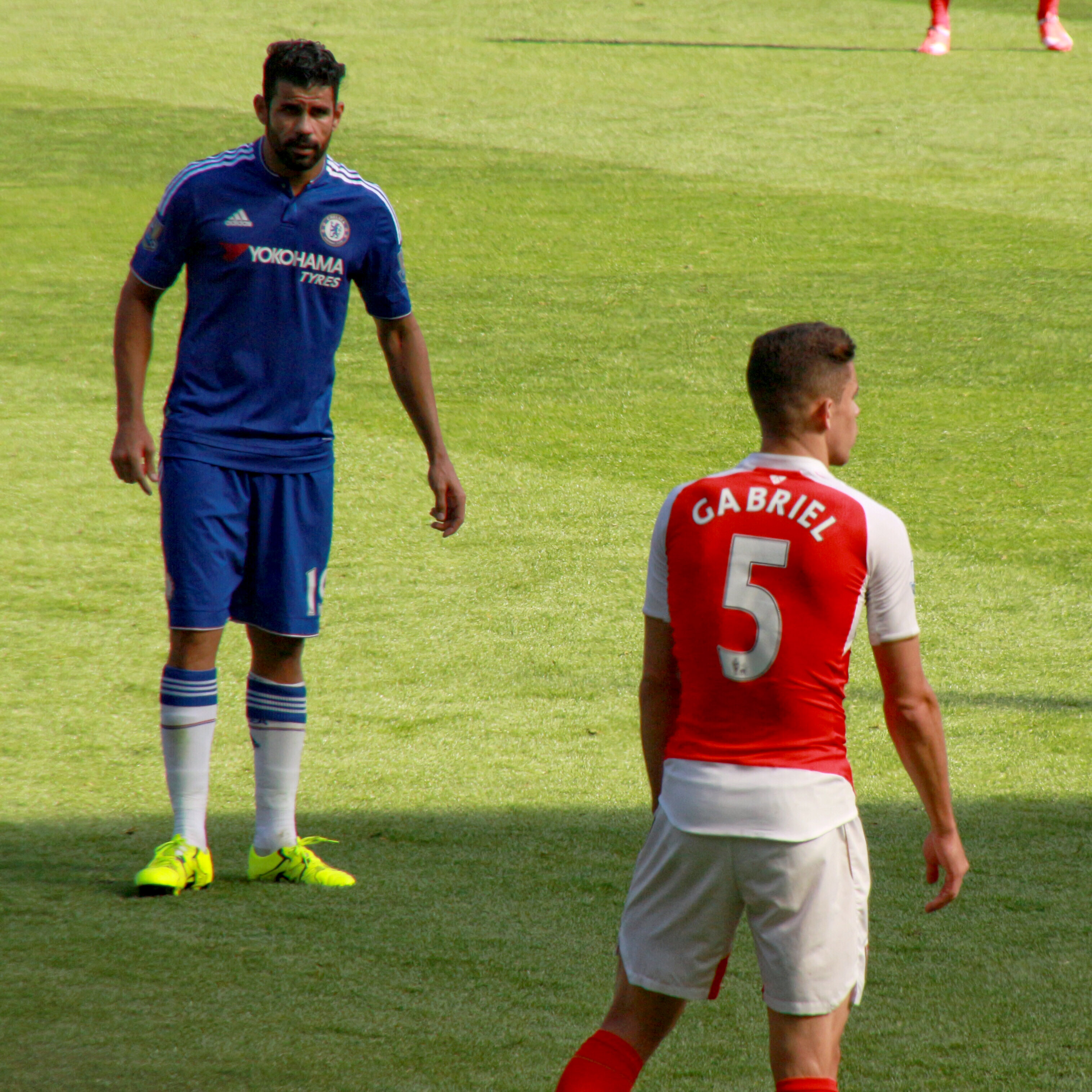
Diego Costa eyeballs Gabriel. The latter would be the recipient of a red card later rescinded, while the former was charged with violent conduct.

Due to injury, Costa missed the 2015 FA Community Shield, which Chelsea lost 1–0 to rivals Arsenal. On 23 August, he scored his first goal of the campaign in a 2–3 win at West Bromwich Albion, which was Chelsea's first victory of the campaign, set up by international teammate Pedro. He scored his first Champions League goal for the team on 16 September, a volley from a Cesc Fàbregas ball in a 4–0 win over Maccabi Tel Aviv.

Three days later, Costa was involved in controversy in a 2–0 home win over Arsenal; he repeatedly slapped Laurent Koscielny and chest-bumped him to the ground, and then confronted Gabriel, who allegedly tried to kick him and was sent off, though footage from ESPN Brazil later showed that little to no contact actually took place. He escaped any punishment at the time. His conduct was deemed "disgusting" by visiting manager Arsène Wenger, and teammate Kurt Zouma initially reacted by saying, "Diego likes to cheat a lot," but later clarified that he meant that "Diego is a player who puts pressure on his opponents". As a consequence, on 21 September, he was charged with violent conduct by the FA. and the following day he was given a three-match suspension. Gabriel's red card was also rescinded, although he was given a one-match ban and £10,000 fine for improper conduct after failing to leave the pitch immediately. After this incident, the Daily Express wrote that Costa was "named as [the] Premier League's dirtiest player".

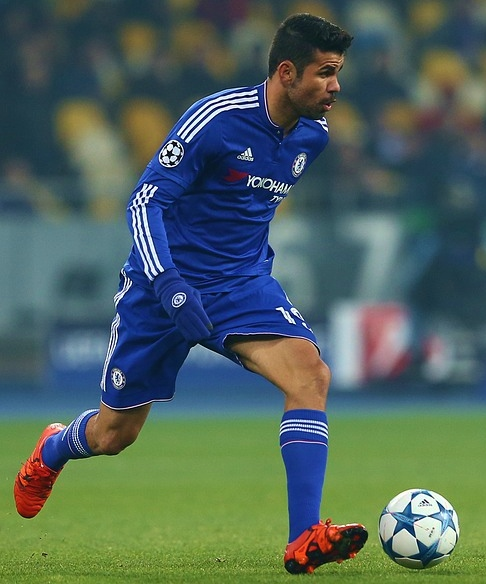
Costa in action at the 2015–16 Champions League group stage match against Dynamo Kyiv in October 2015

After a 1–0 defeat at Stoke City on 7 November, a Britannia Stadium steward made an allegation of assault against Costa, which was resolved without further action. Also that month, Costa was again involved in a skirmish with Liverpool's Martin Škrtel, where he appeared to dig his boot into the Slovak defender's chest, but escaped punishment by the FA. On 29 November, Costa was an unused substitute in a match against Tottenham and threw his bib on the floor when Ruben Loftus-Cheek was sent on at his expense. Mourinho told the media that, "For me his behaviour is normal. A top player on the bench will not be happy."

Costa, Oscar and Fàbregas were targeted by Chelsea supporters as the players whose poor form led to the dismissal of popular manager José Mourinho in December 2015. Costa scored twice in the first game under interim replacement Guus Hiddink, a 2–2 home draw against Watford. Costa, who played in a protective mask after breaking his nose in training, improved his form under the Dutchman, scoring seven times in his first eight games under the new management.

On 12 March 2016, Costa received his first red card in a Chelsea shirt near the end of their 2–0 FA Cup quarter-final defeat to Everton for confronting opponent Gareth Barry. Footage appeared to show Costa biting Barry during that confrontation after clashing heads. Earlier in the match, Costa appeared to spit in the direction of the referee after he was yellow-carded for a clash with Barry. Later, both Costa and Barry denied that the bite occurred. Costa's two-match ban was extended to three, and he was fined £20,000. On 2 May, as Chelsea drew 2–2 against Tottenham to deny them the title, Costa was gouged in the eyes by Mousa Dembélé during a mass brawl; the Belgian received a retrospective six-match ban.

==== 2016–17 season ====
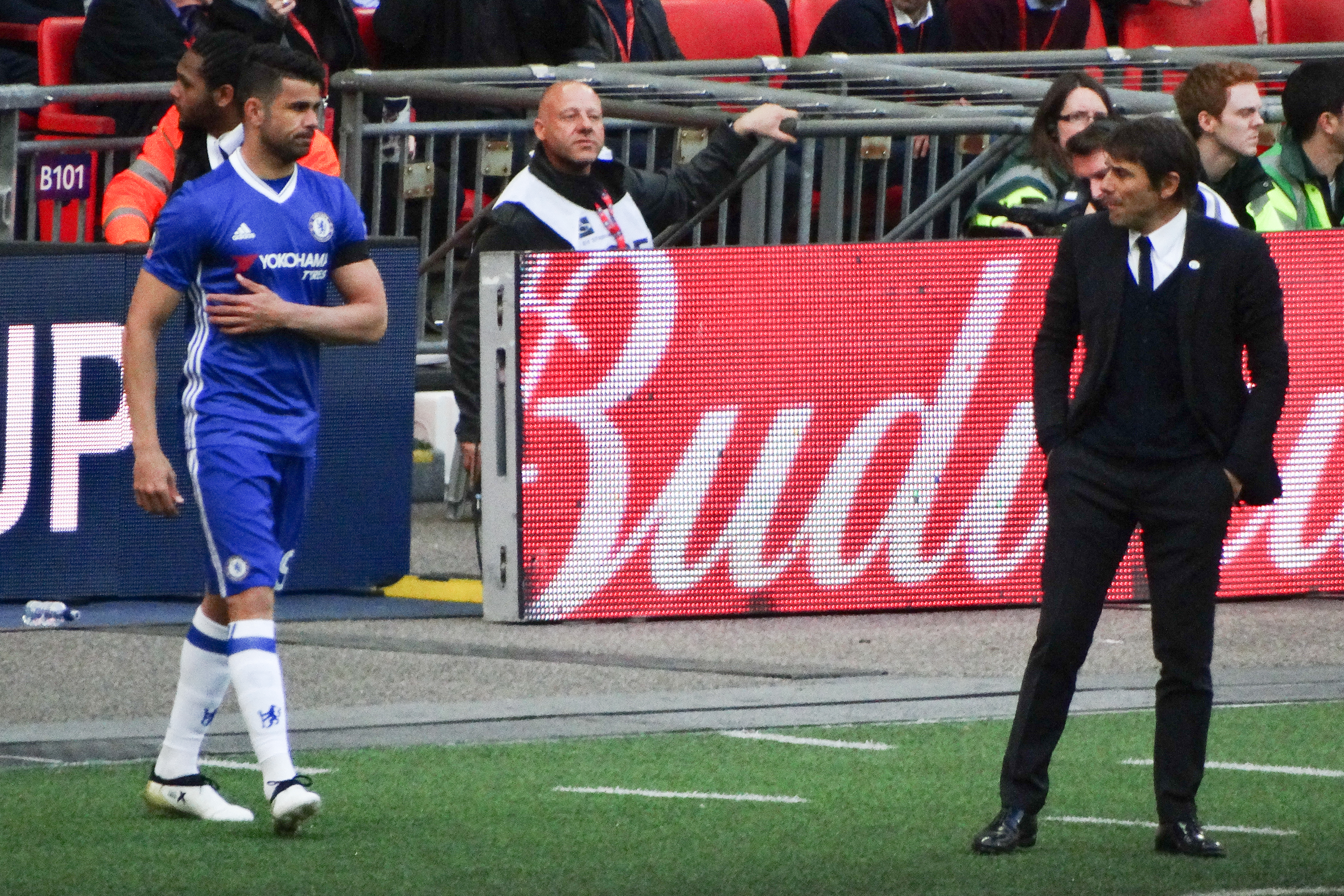
Costa with manager Antonio Conte during the 2017 FA Cup semi-final against Tottenham Hotspur

On 15 August 2016, Costa scored a late winner against West Ham United to give Chelsea a 2–1 win in their season opener. During the match, he caught opposing goalkeeper Adrián with a late challenge when already on a yellow card, but did not receive a second yellow and went on to score the winner; Adrián stated after the match that he was fortunate not to be seriously injured. On 15 October, he scored in a 3–0 over reigning Premier League champions Leicester City, and on 20 November Costa became the first player to reach ten league goals for the season, with the only one of the game at Middlesbrough. With two goals and two assists for league leaders Chelsea, he was voted Premier League Player of the Month for the second time in November 2016, with his manager Antonio Conte picking up the equivalent.

In January 2017, Costa fell out with Conte and was dropped from the team, amidst interest from the Chinese Super League. A potential move to Tianjin Quanjian F.C. was curtailed by the league limiting the number of foreign players in each team. He returned to Chelsea's starting line-up on 22 January, opening a 2–0 win over Hull City, his 52nd goal on his 100th appearance. Costa was Chelsea's top scorer with 20 goals as they regained the Premier League title. On 27 May, he scored an equaliser in the 2017 FA Cup Final against Arsenal, a 2–1 loss.

==== 2017–18 season ====
"Hi Diego, I hope you are well. Thanks for the seasono [sic] we spent together. Good luck for the next year but you are not in my plan."

— Antonio Conte informing Costa by text in June 2017 that he would no longer be involved with Chelsea

In June 2017, Costa was told by Conte that he was not part of his plans for the coming season and that he was free to move to another team via text message. Although Costa was linked to potential moves to the likes of Milan, Monaco, and Everton, he stated that he would only be open to moving back to his former team Atlético Madrid. Costa attempted to find a legal solution through his lawyer in pushing for a move back to Madrid, and said that Chelsea were treating him like a "criminal" by demanding a high transfer fee for his exit. He was excluded from training with the first-team, but was named in the Premier League squad, yet left out of the Champions League squad.

=== Return to Atlético Madrid ===
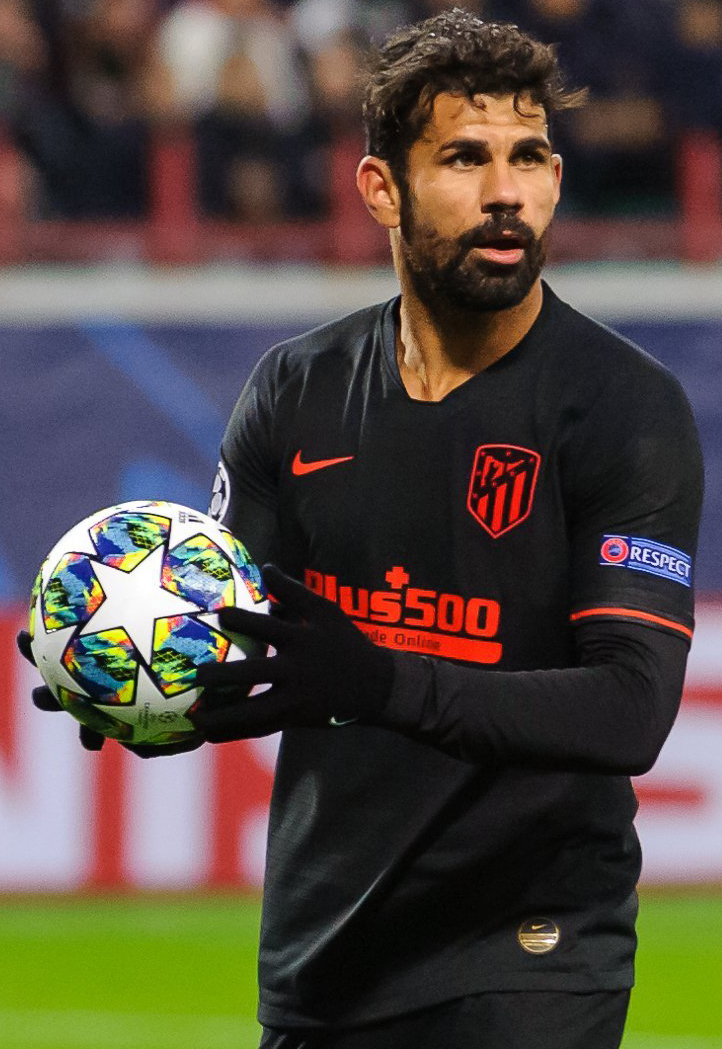
Costa with Atlético in 2019

On 21 September 2017, Chelsea announced that Costa would return to Atlético at the start of the next transfer window in January 2018. On 26 September 2017, it was announced that after passing medical tests Costa signed a contract with Atlético. He was registered and became eligible to play after 1 January 2018, due to a transfer ban imposed on Atlético.

On 3 January 2018, he scored on his return game against Lleida Esportiu in the Copa del Rey round of 16, just five minutes after being substituted on for Ángel Correa in the 64th minute. Three days later in his first league game back, he started in a 2–0 win over Getafe at the Wanda Metropolitano and scored the second goal. However, having already been cautioned for a stray elbow on Djene Dakonam, he was cautioned for a second time for charging into the stands to celebrate his goal, thus being sent off. ESPN FC credited Costa as being a key element in Antoine Griezmann's return to form, opining that Costa's "physical presence at centre-forward has understandably distracted opposition defenders quite a lot. Griezmann has now taken up a roaming No. 10 role, with freedom to go where he feels best"; Atlético manager Diego Simeone namechecked three of Atlético's players in particular–Costa, Koke, and Filipe Luís–who had helped Griezmann perform.

Costa scored the only goal of Atlético's 1–0 home win over Arsenal in the second leg of the Europa League semi-finals, sending them into the 2018 UEFA Europa League Final 2–1 on aggregate. He played in the final in Lyon, a 3–0 win over Olympique de Marseille.

In Atlético's first match of 2018–19, the UEFA Super Cup at the Lilleküla Stadium in Estonia, Costa scored twice – including in the first 50 seconds – in a 4–2 win after extra time against Real Madrid.

On 6 April 2019, he was sent off in the 28th minute against FC Barcelona, and was handed an 8-match ban for abusing a referee. On 18 June 2020, Costa marked his 200th club appearance for Los Colchoneros when he started in a huge 5–0 away win against Osasuna. Costa scored his fifth goal of the season in a 1–0 home victory against Real Betis to ensure his team a top four finish and qualification for the next season's Champions League. On 29 December 2020, Costa and Atlético agreed to terminate their contract, making Costa a free-agent.

=== Atlético Mineiro ===
On 14 August 2021, Costa joined Brazilian club Atlético Mineiro, signing a deal until December 2022. He scored on his debut on 29 August, coming off the bench in the second half and equalising in a 1–1 league draw with Red Bull Bragantino. With fellow veteran Hulk partnering him, his club won the double of Campeonato Brasileiro Série A and Copa do Brasil; they won the league by a 13-point advantage, and defeated Athletico Paranaense 6–1 on aggregate in the cup final, though Costa was substituted through injury early in the second leg. On 16 January 2022, after playing 19 times and scoring 5 goals, Costa terminated his contract.

=== Wolverhampton Wanderers ===
On 12 September 2022, Costa joined Premier League club Wolverhampton Wanderers until the end of the 2022–23 season. As part of a video filming aimed for social media for his public unveil, he was seen holding a chained pack of wolves. On 1 October, he made his debut for the club, coming on in the 58th minute in a 2–0 defeat to West Ham United at the London Stadium. Four weeks later, he was given his first Premier League red card of his career for headbutting Ben Mee in a 1–1 draw away to Brentford. He was suspended for three games, and due to the break for the 2022 FIFA World Cup did not return until late December; new manager Julen Lopetegui said "I want to see his character, playing football, not making silly things".

Costa made his 100th appearance in the Premier League, his 11th for Wolves, as a second-half substitute against Bournemouth at Molineux on 18 February 2023. He suffered a knee injury in the first-half of Wolves' 1–0 home win against Tottenham Hotspur on 4 March and was carried off the pitch on a stretcher. On 15 April, he scored his first goal for Wolves in a 2–0 home win against Brentford, his first goal in English football in nearly six years. It was his only goal in 25 total appearances for the club from the West Midlands. On 3 June, Wolves announced that Costa would leave at the end of his contract, alongside João Moutinho and Adama Traoré.

=== Botafogo ===
On 12 August 2023, Costa signed for Brazilian club Botafogo on a six-month contract. He chose the club over Rio de Janeiro rivals Vasco da Gama, and was signed as a replacement for the injured Tiquinho Soares. Under former Wolves manager Bruno Lage, he made his debut a week later, playing the last 22 minutes of a goalless draw away to São Paulo; he completed half of his eight passes and lost possession six times. In his next league game on 27 August, he scored twice in a 3–0 home win over Bahia, keeping his team in first place and preserving an unbroken run of wins at the Estádio Olímpico Nilton Santos.

Costa scored three goals in 15 total appearances for Botafogo, including two games in the Copa Sudamericana. After negotiations for a new contract collapsed, he was released on 10 January 2024.

=== Grêmio ===
On 8 February 2024, Costa signed for Grêmio on a free transfer. He was signed to replace Luis Suárez, and joined on a deal until the end of the year. He made his debut on 2 March, scoring to conclude a 4–1 home win over Guarany in the last group game of the Campeonato Gaúcho. Despite playing only six games, he was top scorer for the season with six goals at age 35, including one on 6 April in the second leg of the final, a 3–1 home win over Juventude in which he was man of the match.

Grêmio lost 1–0 away to Bahia on 27 April. Costa, who had already been substituted, was sent off for dissent while on the bench, leading manager Renato Gaúcho to send all the other substitutes to the changing room to avoid a similar event. On 8 June, he suffered a left thigh tear in a 1–1 draw at home to Estudiantes de La Plata in the group stage of the Copa Libertadores, ruling him out for an estimated six-to-eight weeks.

Costa played 26 games for Grêmio, scoring eight goals and assisting five, while losing prominence in the team after the signing of Martin Braithwaite. At the end of his deal, he was linked with Nacional, across the border in Uruguay.

In October 2025, Spanish sports newspaper Diario AS reported that 37-year-old Costa had not played for ten months but had not announced his retirement; he was living in Madrid and was an ambassador for Atlético Madrid at the 2025 FIFA Club World Cup in the United States. He announced his retirement from professional football in February 2026 on a podcast with former Atlético Madrid teammate Mario Suárez, saying "I retired a little while ago. My agent was looking for something, but the passion I once had was already gone".

== International career ==
=== Brazil ===
On 5 March 2013, Costa was called up to the Brazil national team by head coach Luiz Felipe Scolari for friendlies with Italy in Geneva and Russia in London, both taking place late in that month. He made his debut in the first match on 21 March, replacing Fred midway through the second half of the 2–2 draw. Four days later at Stamford Bridge, he replaced Kaká for the last 12 minutes of a 1–1 draw with Russia.

=== Request to change teams ===
In September 2013, the Royal Spanish Football Federation made an official request to FIFA for permission to call up Costa for the Spain national team. He had been granted Spanish nationality in July. FIFA regulations currently permit players with more than one nationality to represent a second country if, like Costa, they had only represented their first country in friendly matches.

On 29 October 2013, Costa declared that he wished to play international football for Spain, sending a letter to the Brazilian Football Confederation (CBF). Following the news, Scolari commented, "A Brazilian player who refuses to wear the shirt of the Brazilian national team and compete in a World Cup in your country is automatically withdrawn. He is turning his back on a dream of millions, to represent our national team, the five-time champions in a World Cup in Brazil."

The CBF judicial director, Carlos Eugênio Lopes, said,

"It's obvious that the reason he made that choice was financial. The chairman [of the CBF, José Maria Marin] authorised me to open a legal action at the Justice Ministry requesting that he lose his Brazilian citizenship, which Diego Costa has rejected... The chairman told me that Costa has proved he's not fit to be part of the Scolari family, that he would contaminate the family because he's not committed to Brazil, but to Spain. He rejected his Brazilian citizenship. Marin has asked me to study the situation deeply in order to keep him from ever playing for Spain. He told me that, from now on, Costa is 'persona non grata' at the national team and that the players themselves wouldn't welcome him because of that episode".

=== Spain ===
On 28 February 2014, Spain manager Vicente del Bosque included Costa in the squad for a friendly against Italy. He finally made his debut on 5 March, playing the full 90 minutes at his club ground, the Vicente Calderón Stadium, as the hosts won 1–0.

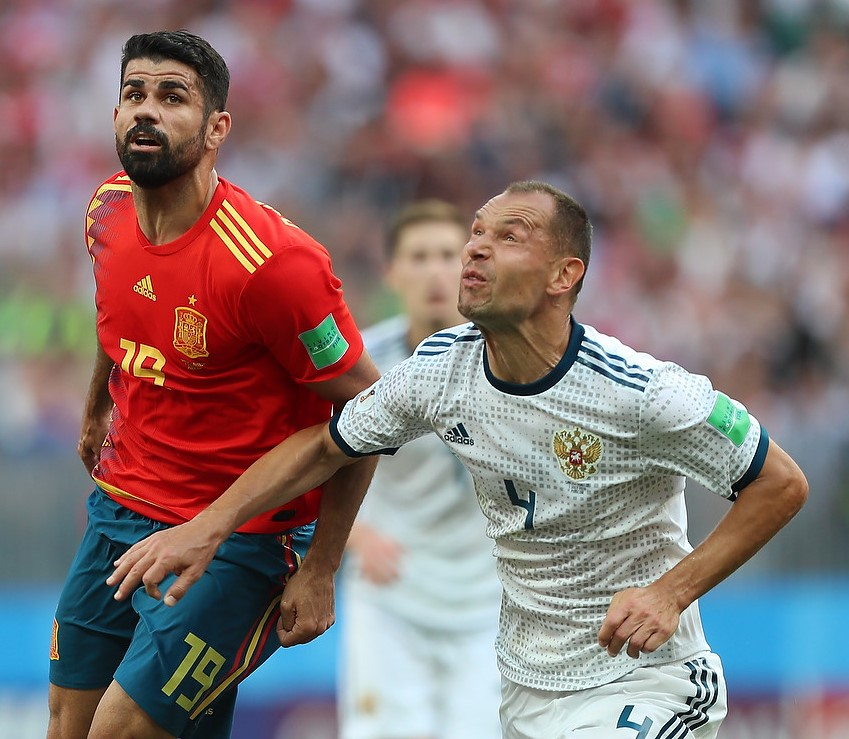
Costa and Russia's Sergei Ignashevich at the 2018 FIFA World Cup

Costa was named in Spain's 30-man provisional squad for the 2014 World Cup, as well as the final list which was named on 31 May. He returned from the injury which had ended his club season by starting in a warm-up game against El Salvador, winning a penalty in a 2–0 victory. In the first match of the tournament, against the Netherlands, he again won a penalty, conceded by Stefan de Vrij and converted by Xabi Alonso for a 1–0 lead but in an eventual 1–5 defeat; he was booed by Brazilian fans during the match. Costa then started in a 0–2 loss to Chile making little impact as he was substituted for Fernando Torres for the second consecutive match, and Spain were eliminated. He was an unused substitute in the team's third match, a 3–0 defeat of Australia.

Costa scored his first goal for Spain with the third in a 4–0 UEFA Euro 2016 qualifying win away to Luxembourg on 12 October 2014. He did not feature again for Spain until 5 September 2015, when he was fouled by Slovakia goalkeeper Matúš Kozáčik for a penalty, which Andrés Iniesta converted for a 2–0 qualifying win at the Estadio Carlos Tartiere in Oviedo. He was substituted for Paco Alcácer later in the match. Del Bosque defended Costa from criticism, saying that he performed well against the Slovak defence. However, he was not included in the final squad for the tournament.

On 5 September 2016, Costa scored his first international goals for nearly two years, in an 8–0 win over Liechtenstein at the Estadio Reino de León for Spain's opening match of 2018 World Cup qualification, the first being a header from a free-kick by his former Atlético teammate Koke. In May 2018, Costa was called up to Spain's squad for the 2018 FIFA World Cup. In their opening game on 15 June in Sochi, he scored his two first World Cup goals to help Spain secure a 3–3 draw against Portugal. Five days later, he scored the winning goal of the match against Iran.

== Player profile ==
=== Style of play and reception ===
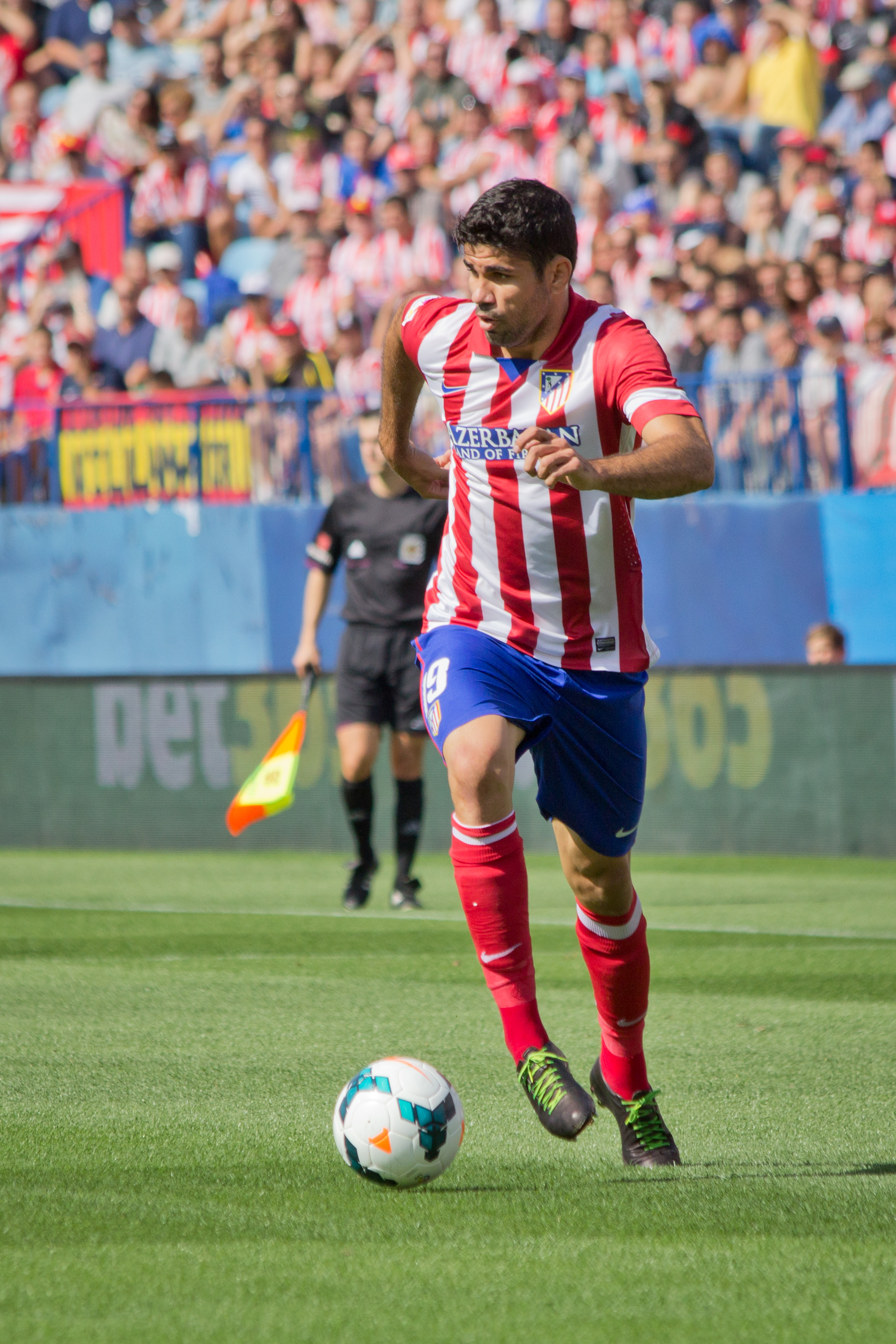
Costa in action for Atlético Madrid in 2013

Friends and family recalled how Costa's style of play changed little over time, with his father stating how as a child, Costa would be furious whenever his team lost. Atlético scout Javier Hernández, on watching 17-year-old Costa play for Penafiel, was impressed by the young forward's determination and power, although found it evident that he was not observing a healthy lifestyle. Costa's Penafiel manager Rui Bento, who was at Sporting CP when Cristiano Ronaldo broke into the team, rated Costa in the same calibre as the Portuguese winger. According to Atlético director Jesús García Pitarch, Costa ranks as one of the best signings of his career, alongside Mohamed Sissoko, Miranda and Ricardo Oliveira.

While on loan at Celta de Vigo, Costa drew comparisons to their former Egyptian striker Mido, who was also known for his temper. During his spell at Albacete, Costa was nicknamed after bullfighter Curro Romero and the Tasmanian devil. His manager, Juan Ignacio Martínez, conceded that Costa played as a model professional for 89 minutes per match, with only one minute per match being his downfall. Costa refers to José Luis Mendilibar as his greatest manager because of his fatherlike "tough love", respecting his talents while keeping strict discipline, once sending Costa to work in a vineyard as a punishment.

Earlier in his Atlético Madrid career, Costa's physical play was used in support of Radamel Falcao, thus ensuring a lower goalscoring rate. After Falcao was sold in 2013, the attack was restructured around Costa by manager Diego Simeone. Simeone, who like Costa was known for his competitiveness and aggression, found ways to enhance his discipline while retaining his determination. In 2014, his club teammate Diego Godín described Costa as the team's "heartbeat", commenting that he "gives us everything," also adding: "Sometimes things aren't going well and he is able to open up the game with his strength and technique." Nick Dorrington of Bleacher Report described him as a "battering ram of a striker: Strong, quick and tireless in his pursuit of the ball," while the club's manager Simeone lauded his work-rate as being "contagious".

Ahead of his competitive debut for Chelsea in August 2014, BBC Sport pundit Robbie Savage described Costa as "the missing piece in the jigsaw" for the "clear favourites" who "could end up winning the title by five or six points". He explained that Chelsea's defence was already the strongest in the league, but a poorer rate of shot-to-goal conversion had cost them the title. He praised Costa's stature and physical style of play which "suits the Premier League down to the ground" in the same role that Didier Drogba previously played at Chelsea, an opinion also voiced by the league's top scorer of all-time, Alan Shearer. Costa has also been attributed with a greater ability to keep possession of the ball than any Chelsea striker since Drogba first left the club in 2012. That same year, Henry Winter of The Telegraph noted that Costa "...has the technique, the strength and the burst of acceleration to destroy defences."

Costa's size, technique, and strength, coupled with his link-up play and ability to hold up the ball with his back to goal allow him to be an effective target-man; moreover, his constant movement and powerful running in the centre-forward role allows him to distract opponents and in turn create space for teammates. Although he was initially known to be inconsistent in the earlier part of his career, due to his low goalscoring rate, he later established himself as a good finisher as his career progressed, which along with his composure in front of goal and ability inside the penalty box, made him a prolific goalscorer, and even saw him regarded by several pundits and managers as one of the best strikers in the world at his peak. In 2018, Simeone lauded Costa for the "enthusiasm" and "aggression" he brings to Atlético Madrid, as well as his "speed, decisiveness, and physical strength."

=== Discipline and controversies ===
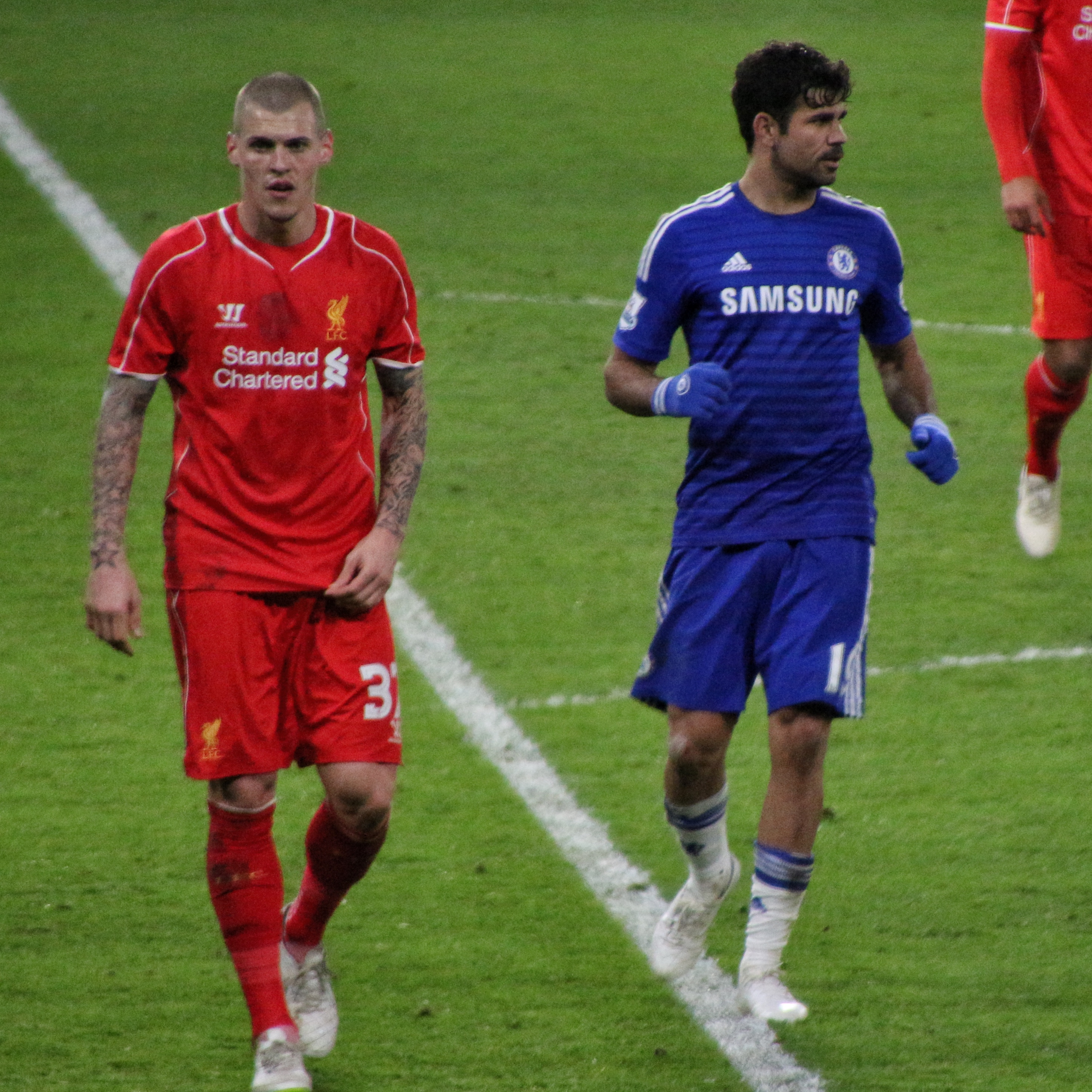
Costa and Martin Škrtel have had several notable clashes.

Costa has been the source of much controversy in his career due to confrontations with opponents, and has received multiple violent conduct charges from The Football Association of England. Opposing managers have also opined that Costa himself intends to provoke his opponents. Danny Murphy of Match of the Day has stated that Costa is targeted by players who "wind him up," but he "remains calm", and is justified to taunt opponents who taunt him. Pat Nevin, a former Chelsea winger, believes that Costa's style of play is likely to cause himself "a few injuries". In August 2014, he was criticised by Everton manager Roberto Martínez for taunting Everton's Séamus Coleman following his own goal, and stated Costa needed "to understand the ethics" of the Premier League. In October 2014, he clashed with Slovakia's Martin Škrtel in a Euro 2016 qualifier.

In January 2015, following two stamp incidents involving Costa and Liverpool players for which Costa received a three-match ban by the FA, Liverpool manager Brendan Rodgers stated that he thought Costa had fouled his players when "he could easily have hurdled over the player" and "there's no need to do it". Costa described his style of play as "strong but noble", and refuted allegations that he deliberately aims to injure opponents.

In late 2015, Costa was the subject of scrutiny for his comparatively poor start to his second season at Chelsea and his low scoring rate for Spain. French newspaper L'Equipe named Costa as the most hated footballer in December 2015, based on his provocative and violent behaviour.

== Career statistics ==
=== Club ===
Appearances and goals by club, season and competition
Club	Season	League			National cup (Note: Includes Taça de Portugal, Copa del Rey, FA Cup, Copa do Brasil)		League cup (Note: Includes Football League/EFL Cup)		Continental		Other		Total	
Club	Season	Division	Apps	Goals	Apps	Goals	Apps	Goals	Apps	Goals	Apps	Goals	Apps	Goals
Penafiel (loan)	2006–07	Liga de Honra	13	5	1	0	—		—		—		14	5
Braga (loan)	2006–07	Primeira Liga	6	0	1	0	—		2 (Note: Appearances in UEFA Cup)	1	—		9	1
Celta Vigo (loan)	2007–08	Segunda División	30	6	1	0	—		—		—		31	6
Albacete (loan)	2008–09	Segunda División	35	10	1	0	—		—		—		36	10
Valladolid	2009–10	La Liga	34	8	2	1	—		—		—		36	9
Atlético Madrid	2010–11	La Liga	28	6	5	1	—		6 (Note: Appearances in UEFA Europa League)	1	—		39	8
Atlético Madrid	2012–13	La Liga	31	10	8	8	—		5	2	—		44	20
Atlético Madrid	2013–14	La Liga	35	27	6	1	—		9 (Note: Appearances in UEFA Champions League)	8	2 (Note: Appearances in Supercopa de España)	0	52	36
Atlético Madrid	Total		94	43	19	10	—		20	11	2	0	135	64
Rayo Vallecano (loan)	2011–12	La Liga	16	10	0	0	—		—		—		16	10
Chelsea	2014–15	Premier League	26	20	1	0	3	1	7	0	—		37	21
Chelsea	2015–16	Premier League	28	12	4	2	1	0	8	2	—		41	16
Chelsea	2016–17	Premier League	35	20	5	2	2	0	—		—		42	22
Chelsea	2017–18	Premier League	0	0	0	0	0	0	0	0	0	0	0	0
Chelsea	Total		89	52	10	4	6	1	15	2	—		120	59
Atlético Madrid	2017–18	La Liga	15	3	3	2	—		5	2	—		23	7
Atlético Madrid	2018–19	La Liga	16	2	0	0	—		4	1	1 (Note: Appearance in UEFA Super Cup)	2	21	5
Atlético Madrid	2019–20	La Liga	23	5	0	0	—		7	0	0	0	30	5
Atlético Madrid	2020–21	La Liga	7	2	0	0	—		0	0	—		7	2
Atlético Madrid	Total		61	12	3	2	—		16	3	1	2	81	19
Atlético Mineiro	2021	Série A	15	4	3	1	—		1 (Note: Appearance(s) in Copa Libertadores)	0	—		19	5
Wolverhampton Wanderers	2022–23	Premier League	23	1	1	0	1	0	—		—		25	1
Botafogo	2023	Série A	13	3	0	0	—		2 (Note: Appearances in Copa Sudamericana)	0	—		15	3
Grêmio	2024	Série A	14	1	2	0	—		4	1	6 (Note: Appearances in Campeonato Gaúcho)	6	26	8
Career total			443	155	44	18	7	1	60	18	9	8	561	200

=== International ===
As of match played 1 July 2018

Appearances and goals by national team and year
National team	Year	Apps	Goals
Brazil	2013	2	0
Brazil	Total	2	0
Spain	2014	7	1
Spain	2015	3	0
Spain	2016	4	3
Spain	2017	2	2
Spain	2018	8	4
Spain	Total	24	10
Career total		26	10

As of match played 20 June 2018. Spain score listed first, score column indicates score after each Costa goal.

International goals by date, venue, cap, opponent, score, result and competition
No.	Date	Venue	Cap	Opponent	Score	Result	Competition
1	12 October 2014	Stade Josy Barthel, Luxembourg City, Luxembourg	7	Luxembourg	3–0	4–0	UEFA Euro 2016 qualification
2	5 September 2016	Estadio Reino de León, León, Spain	12	Liechtenstein	1–0	8–0	2018 FIFA World Cup qualification
3	5 September 2016	Estadio Reino de León, León, Spain	12	Liechtenstein	5–0	8–0	2018 FIFA World Cup qualification
4	9 October 2016	Loro Boriçi Stadium, Shkodër, Albania	14	Albania	1–0	2–0	2018 FIFA World Cup qualification
5	24 March 2017	El Molinón, Gijón, Spain	15	Israel	3–0	4–1	2018 FIFA World Cup qualification
6	11 June 2017	Philip II Arena, Skopje, Macedonia	16	Macedonia	2–0	2–1	2018 FIFA World Cup qualification
7	27 March 2018	Wanda Metropolitano, Madrid, Spain	18	Argentina	1–0	6–1	Friendly
8	15 June 2018	Fisht Olympic Stadium, Sochi, Russia	21	Portugal	1–1	3–3	2018 FIFA World Cup
9	15 June 2018	Fisht Olympic Stadium, Sochi, Russia	21	Portugal	2–2	3–3	2018 FIFA World Cup
10	20 June 2018	Kazan Arena, Kazan, Russia	22	Iran	1–0	1–0	2018 FIFA World Cup

== Honours ==
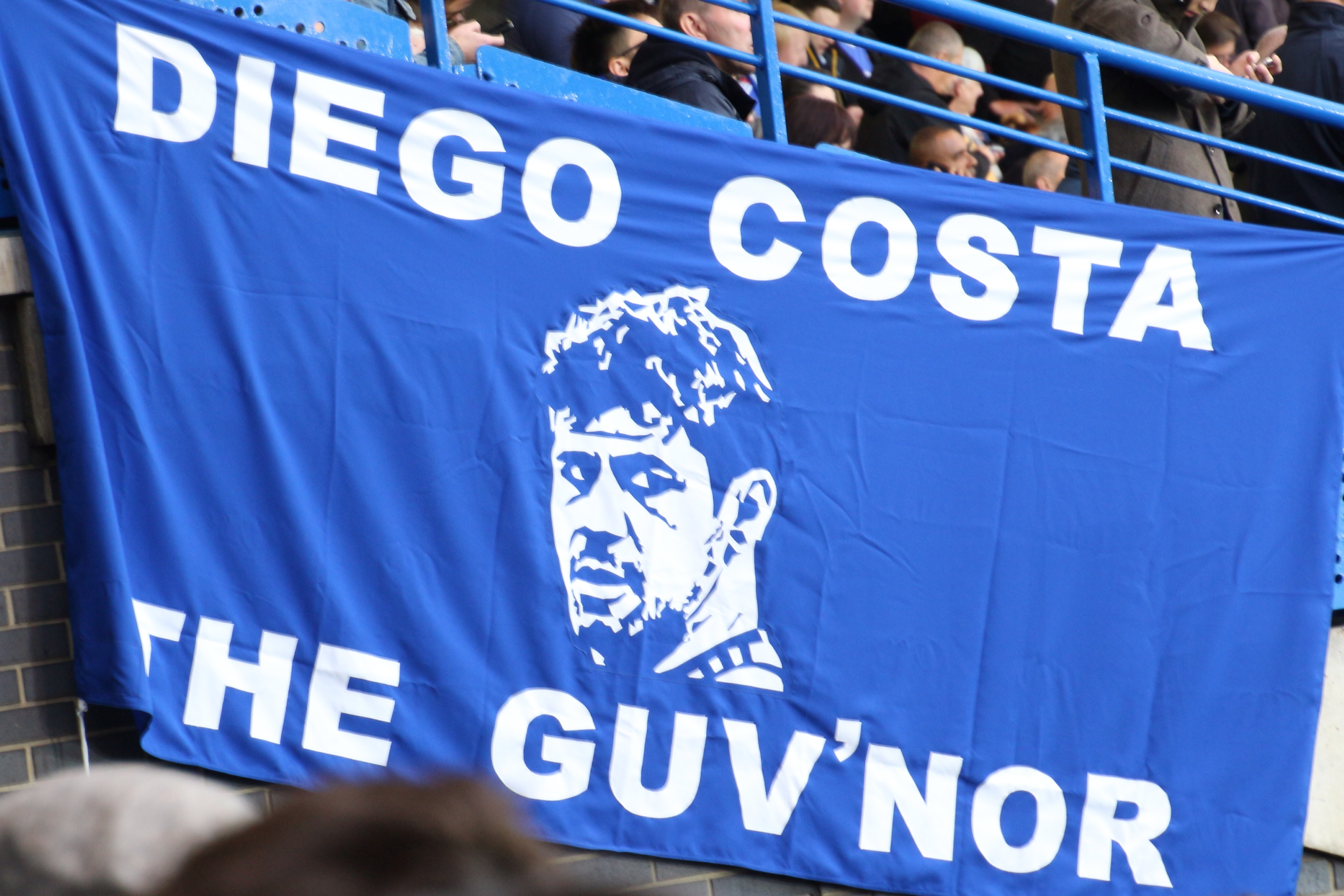
Chelsea supporters' banner in honour of Costa, November 2014

Atlético Madrid

- La Liga: 2013–14, 2020–21
- Copa del Rey: 2012–13
- UEFA Europa League: 2017–18
- UEFA Super Cup: 2010, 2012, 2018
- UEFA Champions League runner-up: 2013–14

Chelsea

- Premier League: 2014–15, 2016–17
- Football League Cup: 2014–15
- FA Cup runner-up: 2016–17

Atlético Mineiro

- Campeonato Brasileiro Série A: 2021
- Copa do Brasil: 2021

Grêmio

- Campeonato Gaúcho: 2024

Individual

- La Liga Player of the Month: September 2013
- La Liga Team of the Season: 2013–14
- Trofeo EFE: 2013–14
- UEFA Champions League Team of the Season: 2013–14
- Zarra Trophy: 2013–14
- Premier League Player of the Month: August 2014, November 2016
- PFA Team of the Year: 2014–15 Premier League
- Campeonato Gaúcho top scorer: 2024

Records

- Fastest goal in the UEFA Super Cup: 2018 (49 seconds in against Real Madrid)

== See also ==
- List of Spain international footballers born outside Spain
- List of association footballers who have been capped for two senior national teams
