= Matheus Sávio =

Brazilian footballer

Matheus Savio
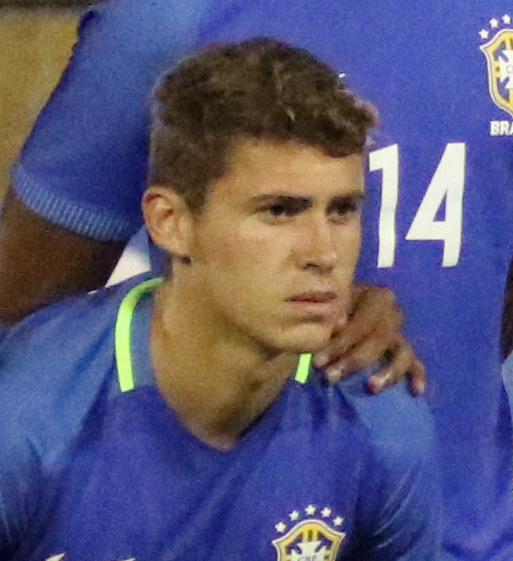

Personal information
- Full name: Matheus Gonçalves Savio
- Date of birth: 15 April 1997 (age 29)
- Place of birth: Brodowski, Brazil
- Height: 1.75 m (5 ft 9 in)
- Positions: Attacking midfielder; winger

Team information
- Current team: Urawa Red Diamonds
- Number: 10

Youth career
- 2013–2014: Desportivo Brasil
- 2014–2016: Flamengo

Senior career*
Years	Team	Apps	(Gls)
2015–2019	Flamengo	22	(5)
2018	→ Estoril (loan)	6	(1)
2019	→ CSA (loan)	17	(1)
2019	→ Kashiwa Reysol (loan)	19	(7)
2020–2025	Kashiwa Reysol	132	(33)
2025–	Urawa Red Diamonds	57	(6)

International career
2016–2018	Brazil U20	7	(1)
- * Club domestic league appearances and goals as of 10 August 2026

Matheus Gonçalves Savio (born 15 April 1997) is a Brazilian footballer who plays as an attacking midfielder or a winger for J1 League club Urawa Red Diamonds.

== Career ==
=== Flamengo ===
Savio debuted in the professional team on 25 March 2015, as a substitute, in a Rio de Janeiro State League match against Bangu. Flamengo won 2–1. Later in the same year he had his first Brazilian Série A appearance on 14 October 2015 against Figueirense. Flamengo lost 3–0 and Savio played only seven minutes, again as substitute.

On 13 May 2017 Savio scored his first Brazilian Série A goal on the season opener 1–1 draw against Atlético Mineiro at Maracanã Stadium.

==== Estoril Praia (loan) ====
On 5 January 2018 Flamengo announced the loan of Matheus Sávio to Estoril until the end of 2018.

==== CSA (loan) ====
On 27 December 2018, Sávio joined CSA on a loan deal.

=== Kashiwa Reysol ===
After a good performance playing on loan for Kashiwa Reysol, Savio signed, on 9 December 2019, his transfer from Flamengo to the Japanese club on a US$1.1 million contract. Flamengo received 50% of the transfer fee.

In the 2024 season, he played all 38 league games in the left wing position. He scored 9 goals with 7 assists.

=== Urawa Red Diamonds ===
After good seasons in the J1 League with Kashiwa, several Japanese clubs were interested in Savio, but, on 15 December 2024, the Urawa Red Diamonds announce that they had signed him.

== Career statistics ==
(Correct As of 5 March 2024)

Club	Season	League			State League		Cup		League Cup		Continental		Other		Total	
Club	Season	Division	Apps	Goals	Apps	Goals	Apps	Goals	Apps	Goals	Apps	Goals	Apps	Goals	Apps	Goals
Flamengo	2015	Série A	1	0	4	2	1	0	—		—		—		6	2
Flamengo	2017	Série A	7	1	5	1	2	1	—		3	0	1	0	18	3
Flamengo	2018	Série A	5	1	0	0	0	0	—		0	0	—		5	1
Flamengo	Total		13	2	9	3	3	1	0	0	3	0	1	0	29	6
Estoril (loan)	2017–18	Primeira Liga	6	1	—		0	0	0	0	—		—		6	1
CSA (loan)	2019	Série A	8	1	9	0	1	0	—		—		9	3	26	4
Kashiwa Reysol (loan)	2019	J2 League	19	7	—		1	0	—		—		—		20	7
Kashiwa Reysol	2020	J1 League	6	0	—		—		0	0	—		—		6	0
Kashiwa Reysol	2021	J1 League	20	2	—		0	0	2	0	—		—		22	2
Kashiwa Reysol	2022	J1 League	32	6	—		1	0	2	2	—		—		35	8
Kashiwa Reysol	2023	J1 League	31	7	—		5	1	6	0	—		—		42	8
Kashiwa Reysol	Total		89	15	0	0	6	1	10	2	0	0	0	0	105	18
Career total			135	27	18	3	11	2	10	2	3	0	10	3	186	36

== Honours ==
Flamengo

- Campeonato Carioca: 2017

CSA

- Campeonato Alagoano: 2019

Kashiwa Reysol

- J2 League: 2019

Individual

- J.League Best XI: 2024
