= Pará (footballer, born 1986) =

Brazilian footballer

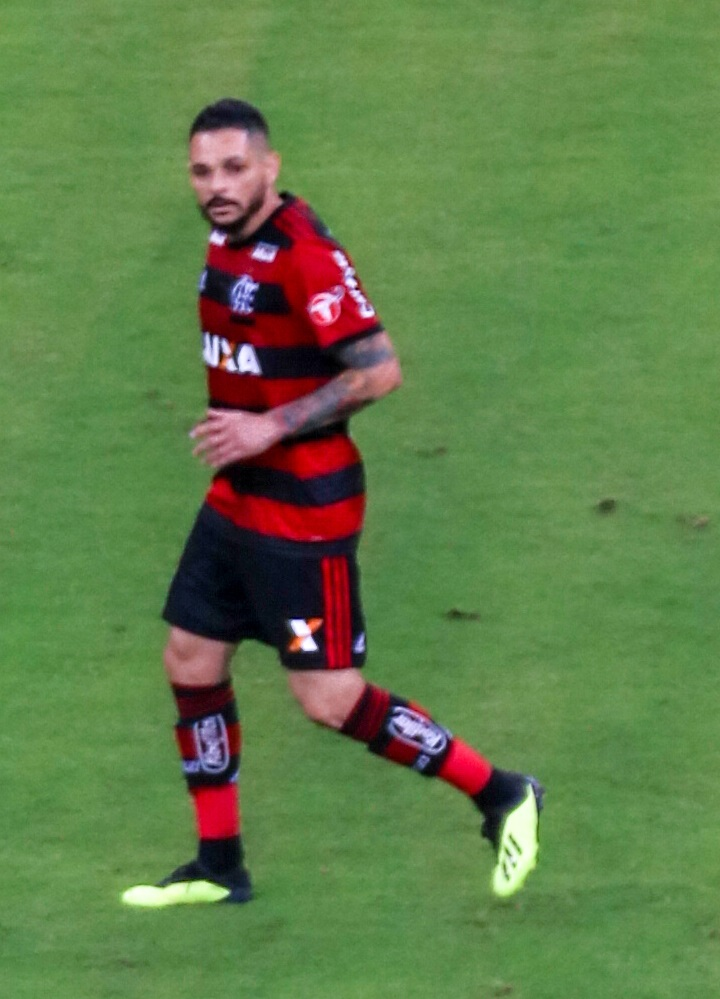
- Pará in action for Flamengo in 2018

Personal information
- Full name: Marcos Rogério Ricci Lopes
- Date of birth: 14 February 1986 (age 40)
- Place of birth: São João do Araguaia, Brazil
- Height: 1.73 m (5 ft 8 in)
- Position: Right back

Youth career
- Barcelona-SP
- 2003–2004: Santo André

Senior career*
Years	Team	Apps	(Gls)
2004–2008	Santo André	134	(14)
2008–2012	Santos	174	(2)
2012	→ Grêmio (loan)	54	(0)
2013–2015	Grêmio	116	(1)
2015	→ Flamengo (loan)	53	(3)
2016–2019	Flamengo	152	(1)
2019–2021	Santos	104	(0)
2022	Brusque	24	(0)
2023	Portuguesa	10	(0)
- * Club domestic league appearances and goals as of 17:11, 1 March 2023 (UTC)

Marcos Rogério Ricci Lopes (born 14 February 1986), commonly known as Pará (Brazilian Portuguese: [pɐˈɾa]), is a Brazilian former professional footballer who plays as a right back. He currently plays in the amateur leagues in São Paulo.

Pará previously played for Santo André, Santos, Grêmio and Flamengo winning multiple titles such as Copa do Brasil and Copa Libertadores.

== Club career ==
=== Santo André ===
Born in São João do Araguaia, Pará, Pará worked as a bricklayer in his hometown before being invited to a trial at São Paulo at the age of 13. After nothing came of it, he started his career at Barcelona Esportivo Capela, before joining Santo André in 2003.

Promoted to the first team in the 2004 season, Pará failed to make an appearance during the campaign, but established himself in the main squad over the years, being utilized in both flanks and often as a midfielder. He was on the squad who won the 2004 Copa do Brasil and the 2008 Campeonato Paulista Série A2.

=== Santos ===
On 30 August 2008, Pará signed a short-term deal with Série A side Santos. He made his top tier debut four days later, coming on as a substitute for Nelson Cuevas in a 2–0 home defeat of Vitória.

Pará scored his first goal for the club on 20 September 2008, but in a 4–1 away loss against Goiás. He contributed with 12 appearances (all as a midfielder) for the club during his first season, as Peixe nearly avoided relegation.

From the 2010 season onwards, Pará became a regular starter in the right back, playing in the squad led by Neymar and winning multiple Campeonato Paulista titles, the 2010 Copa do Brasil, the 2011 Copa Libertadores and finishing runners-up in the 2011 FIFA Club World Cup.

=== Grêmio ===
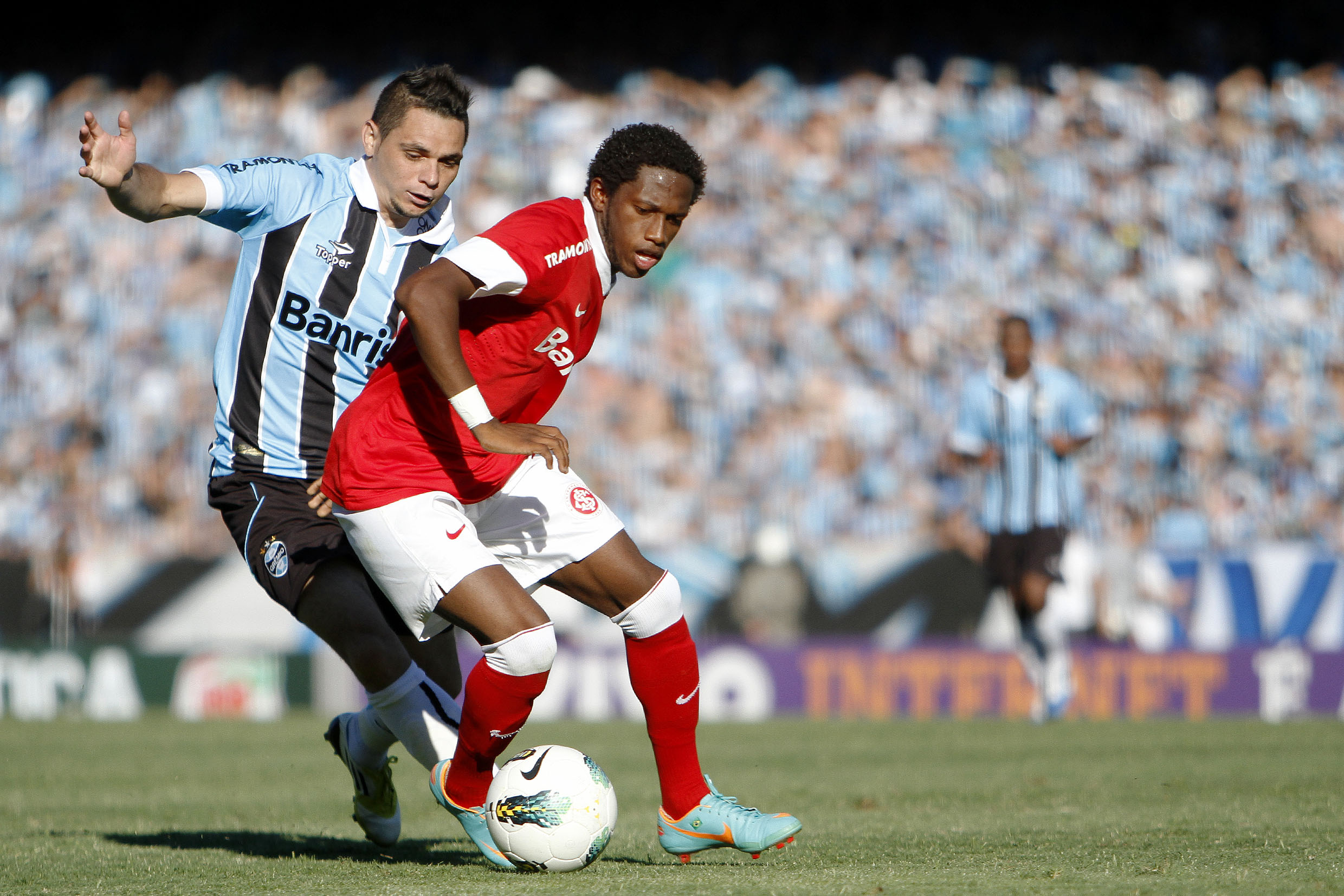
Pará (left) playing for Grêmio in 2012

On 28 February 2012, after falling down the pecking order due to the arrival of Jorge Fucile and the return of Maranhão, Pará was loaned to fellow top tier side Grêmio until the end of the year. An undisputed starter during the season, he contributed with 54 appearances overall as his team finished third.

On 9 January 2013, Pará was again presented at Grêmio, after agreeing to a permanent three-year contract with the club.

=== Flamengo ===
On 7 January 2015, Pará was loaned to Flamengo for one year; the loan was mainly a part of a debt discharge for Rodrigo Mendes' signing in 2000. Initially a backup to longtime incumbent Léo Moura, he became a first-choice during the campaign as the latter left to join Fort Lauderdale Strikers.

On 16 May 2017 Pará extended his contract with Fla until December 2019.

=== Return to Santos ===
On 3 August 2019, Santos announced the return of Pará to the club, after agreeing to a contract until December 2020. On 30 October 2020, he renewed his link until December 2022.

On 9 December 2021, after 292 matches for the club, Pará terminated his contract with Santos.

=== Cruzeiro ===
Just hours after leaving Santos, Pará was announced at Série B side Cruzeiro for the 2022 campaign, after agreeing to a pre-contract with the club. On 30 December, after Ronaldo bought the club and turned it into a SAF (Sociedade Anônima do Futebol), he reached an agreement with the board and rescinded his pre-contract.

=== Later career ===
On 6 April 2022, Pará signed for Brusque in the second division until the end of the year. On 8 December, after the club's relegation, he was announced at Portuguesa.

On 31 March 2023, after narrowly avoiding relegation in the 2023 Campeonato Paulista, Pará left Lusa.

== Career statistics ==
As of 19 October 2023.

Club	Season	League			State League		Cup		Continental		Other		Total	
Club	Season	Division	Apps	Goals	Apps	Goals	Apps	Goals	Apps	Goals	Apps	Goals	Apps	Goals
Santo André	2004	Série B	0	0	0	0	0	0	—		—		0	0
Santo André	2005	Série B	5	1	3	0	—		0	0	—		8	1
Santo André	2006	Série B	16	1	12	1	2	0	—		—		30	2
Santo André	2007	Série B	35	3	17	1	—		—		—		52	4
Santo André	2008	Série B	22	6	24	1	—		—		—		46	7
Santo André	Total		78	11	56	3	2	0	0	0	—		136	14
Santos	2008	Série A	12	1	—		—		—		—		12	1
Santos	2009	Série A	32	0	17	0	4	0	—		—		53	0
Santos	2010	Série A	31	0	20	1	9	0	2 (Note: Appearance(s) in Copa Sudamericana.)	0	—		62	1
Santos	2011	Série A	20	0	18	0	—		10 (Note: Appearance(s) in Copa Libertadores.)	0	0	0	48	0
Santos	2012	Série A	0	0	4	0	—		0	0	—		4	0
Santos	Total		95	1	59	1	13	0	12	0	0	0	179	2
Grêmio	2012	Série A	34	0	7	0	7	0	5	0	—		53	0
Grêmio	2013	Série A	35	1	10	0	6	0	10	0	—		61	1
Grêmio	2014	Série A	33	0	13	0	1	0	8	0	—		55	0
Grêmio	Total		102	1	30	0	14	0	23	0	—		169	1
Flamengo	2015	Série A	29	1	17	1	7	1	—		—		53	3
Flamengo	2016	Série A	27	0	2	0	0	0	2	0	1 (Note: Appearance(s) in Primeira Liga.)	0	32	0
Flamengo	2017	Série A	29	1	14	0	7	0	14 (Note: Five appearances in Copa Libertadores, nine appearances in Copa Sudamericana.)	0	—		64	1
Flamengo	2018	Série A	20	0	6	0	2	0	2	0	—		30	0
Flamengo	2019	Série A	6	0	12	0	2	0	6	0	—		26	0
Flamengo	Total		111	2	51	1	18	1	24	0	1	0	205	4
Santos	2019	Série A	11	0	—		—		—		—		11	0
Santos	2020	Série A	27	0	13	0	1	0	12	0	—		53	0
Santos	2021	Série A	20	0	6	0	4	0	10 (Note: Nine appearances and one goal in Copa Libertadores, one appearance in Copa Sudamericana)	1	—		40	1
Santos	Total		58	0	19	0	5	0	22	1	—		104	1
Brusque	2022	Série B	24	0	—		—		—		—		24	0
Portuguesa	2023	Paulista	—		11	0	—		—		—		11	0
Career total			468	15	226	5	52	1	81	1	1	0	828	22

== Honours ==
=== Club ===
Santo André

- Copa do Brasil: 2004
- Campeonato Paulista Série A2: 2008

Santos

- Campeonato Paulista: 2010, 2011
- Copa do Brasil: 2010
- Copa Libertadores: 2011

Flamengo

- Campeonato Carioca: 2017, 2019
