= Igor Rocha (footballer, born 1995) =

Brazilian footballer

Personal information
- Full name: Igor Henrique de Souza Rocha
- Date of birth: 21 September 1995 (age 31)
- Place of birth: Campinas, Brazil
- Height: 1.72 m (5 ft 8 in)
- Position: Forward

Team information
- Current team: Żebbuġ Rangers (on loan from St. Lucia)
- Number: 22

Youth career
- 2008–2012: Paulínia
- 2013–2014: Ponte Preta
- 2015: Rio Branco-SP
- 2016: Barcelona-SP

Senior career*
Years	Team	Apps	(Gls)
2016–2017	Benfica B	2	(0)
2018–	St. Lucia		
2019–	→ Żebbuġ Rangers (loan)	8	(2)
- * Club domestic league appearances and goals as of 26 March 2019

Igor Henrique de Souza Rocha (born 21 September 1995) is a Brazilian professional footballer who plays as a forward for Maltese side Żebbuġ Rangers on loan from St. Lucia.

== Club career ==
Rocha initially joined Benfica on trial in 2016, featuring in a handful of friendlies and scoring in an 8–0 win over U.D. Vilafranquense. He signed a professional contract but would have to wait until April 2017 to make his debut due to a rupture of the anterior cruciate ligament in his right knee. His debut came in a Benfica B 2–1 victory over Porto B.

== Career statistics ==
=== Club ===
As of 14 September 2018.

Club	Season	League			Cup		Continental		Other		Total	
Club	Season	Division	Apps	Goals	Apps	Goals	Apps	Goals	Apps	Goals	Apps	Goals
Benfica B	2016–17	LigaPro	2	0	0	0	–		0	0	2	0
St. Lucia	2018–19	Maltese First Division	0	0	0	0	–		0	0	0	0
Career total			2	0	0	0	0	0	0	0	2	0
