= Ernando =

Brazilian footballer (born 1988)

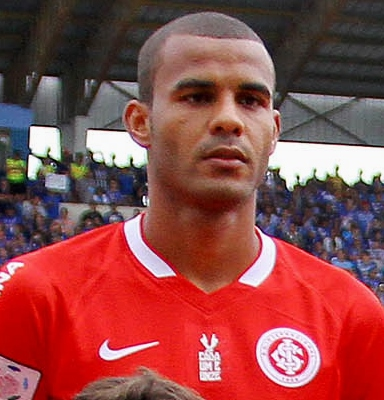

Personal information
- Full name: Ernando Rodrigues Lopes
- Date of birth: April 17, 1988 (age 38)
- Place of birth: Formosa, Brazil
- Height: 1.84 m (6 ft 0 in)
- Position: Centre back

Youth career
- 2001–2006: Goiás

Senior career*
Years	Team	Apps	(Gls)
2006–2013	Goiás	277	(7)
2014–2018	Internacional	170	(8)
2018	→ Sport Recife (loan)	32	(0)
2019–2021	Bahia	65	(4)
2021	Vasco da Gama	27	(0)
2022	Guarani	16	(1)
- * Club domestic league appearances and goals

Ernando Rodrigues Lopes (born 17 April 1988), simply known as Ernando, is a Brazilian former footballer who played as a centre back.

== Career ==
Ernando made his professional debut for Goiás in a 2–2 away draw against Botafogo in the Campeonato Brasileiro on 19 November 2006. He scored his first professional goal in a 3–0 away win over the same club on 30 September of the following year.

== Honours ==
Goiás

- Campeonato Goiano: 2006, 2009, 2012, 2013
- Campeonato Brasileiro Série B: 2012

Internacional

- Campeonato Gaúcho: 2014, 2015, 2016
- Recopa Gaúcha: 2017

Bahia

- Campeonato Baiano: 2019
