= Henrique (footballer, born May 1986) =

Brazilian footballer

Personal information
- Full name: Henrique Loureiro dos Santos
- Date of birth: 13 May 1986 (age 40)
- Place of birth: Itabuna, Brazil
- Height: 1.78 m (5 ft 10 in)
- Position: Right-back

Youth career
- 2004–2005: Catuense-BA
- 2006: Inter (SM)
- 2007: Bahia

Senior career*
Years	Team	Apps	(Gls)
2007	Colo-Colo-BRA	4	(1)
2008–2011	Tupi	19	(3)
2008–2009	→ Ituano (loan)	21	(2)
2009	→ Palmeiras (loan)	1	(0)
2010	→ Vila Nova (loan)		
2011	→ São Bernardo (loan)		
2011	Fortaleza		
2011–2014	Tupi	16	(1)
2013	→ Boa Esporte (loan)		
2015	Volta Redonda		
2015	Macaé	22	(2)
2016	Figueirense	3	(0)
2016	Tupi	26	(0)
2017	Volta Redonda	16	(0)
2018	Madureira	6	(0)
2018	Figueirense		
2019	Paracatu		
2020	Tupynambás		
- * Club domestic league appearances and goals

Henrique Loureiro dos Santos (born 13 May 1986), known as Henrique, is a former soccer defender from Brazil.

== Career ==
Henrique began his career with Catuense-BA and joined in July 2006 to Inter (SM). After a half year left in summer 2007 Inter (SM) and signed with Bahia, later signed in October 2007 with Colo-Colo-BRA. He left Colo-Colo-BRA in January 2008 and signed with Tupi, after just few months signed with Ituano. On 16 May 2009 Palmeiras have signed the right-back from Ituano.
