= Arthur Maia (footballer) =

Brazilian footballer (1992–2016)

Personal information
- Full name: Arthur Brasiliano Maia
- Date of birth: 13 October 1992
- Place of birth: Maceió, Brazil
- Date of death: 28 November 2016 (aged 24)
- Place of death: La Unión, Colombia
- Height: 1.72 m (5 ft 7 1/2 in)
- Positions: Winger; attacking midfielder

Youth career
- 2001–2003: CSA
- 2003–2012: Vitoria

Senior career*
Years	Team	Apps	(Gls)
2011–2016	Vitoria	44	(3)
2013	→ Joinville (loan)	16	(2)
2014	→ América de Natal (loan)	34	(6)
2015	→ Flamengo (loan)	14	(1)
2015	→ Kawasaki Frontale (loan)	4	(0)
2016	→ Chapecoense (loan)	21	(2)
Total		133	(14)
- * Club domestic league appearances and goals

Arthur Brasiliano Maia (13 October 1992 – 28 November 2016), known as Arthur Maia, was a Brazilian professional footballer who played for Chapecoense on loan from Vitória, as a winger or attacking midfielder.

Maia was one of the victims when LaMia Airlines Flight 2933 crashed on 28 November 2016.

== Club career ==
Born in Maceió, Alagoas, Maia joined Vitória's youth setup in 2003, aged ten, from CSA. He made his first team debut on 4 February 2010, coming on as a substitute in a 1–0 Campeonato Baiano home win against Feirense.

Maia's first goal came on 14 September 2011, in a 5–1 home routing of Duque de Caxias for the Série B championship. He was sparingly used during his beginnings at the club, however.

On 4 February 2013, Maia was loaned to fellow second tier club Joinville until December. His loan was cut short on 11 September, and he made his Série A debut with Vitória ten days later, in a 0–0 home draw against Grêmio.

On 12 February 2014, Maia was loaned to América-RN until the end of the campaign. He featured regularly for the club during the year, scoring a career-best seven goals in 36 appearances overall.

On 1 December 2014, Maia agreed to a one-year loan contract at Flamengo. Rarely used, he left the club the following 29 July and signed for Kawasaki Frontale, also in a temporary deal.

Maia returned to Vitória ahead of the 2016 season, but was loaned again on 12 May, now to Chapecoense. He scored his first goal in the top flight on 11 June, but in a 1–2 away loss against Ponte Preta.

== Death ==
On 28 November 2016, when Chapecoense were en route to the first leg of the 2016 Copa Sudamericana Finals to play against Atlético Nacional, Maia was among the fatalities of the LaMia Airlines Flight 2933 accident in the Colombian village of Cerro Gordo, La Unión, Antioquia.

== Career statistics ==
As of 27 November 2016

Club	Season	League			State League		Cup		Continental		Other		Total	
Club	Season	Division	Apps	Goals	Apps	Goals	Apps	Goals	Apps	Goals	Apps	Goals	Apps	Goals
Vitória	2010	Série A	0	0	5	0	—		—		—		5	0
Vitória	2011	Série B	4	1	1	0	—		—		—		5	1
Vitória	2012	Série B	8	0	18	2	4	1	—		—		30	3
Vitória	2013	Série A	1	0	0	0	0	0	—		1 (Note: Appearance(s) in Copa do Nordeste)	0	2	0
Vitória	2014	Série A	0	0	0	0	0	0	—		2	0	2	0
Vitória	2016	Série A	0	0	7	0	2	0	—		—		9	0
Vitória	Subtotal		13	1	31	2	6	1	—		3	0	53	4
Joinville (loan)	2013	Série B	4	1	12	1	—		—		—		16	1
América de Natal (loan)	2014	Série B	21	1	13	5	2	1	—		—		36	7
Flamengo (loan)	2015	Série A	5	0	9	1	4	1	—		—		18	2
Kawasaki Frontale (loan)	2015	J1 League	4	0	—		0	0	—		—		4	0
Chapecoense	2016	Série A	21	2	—		—		2 (Note: Appearance(s) in Copa Sudamericana)	0	—		23	2
Career total			68	5	65	9	12	3	2	0	3	0	150	17

== Honours ==
Vitória

- Campeonato Baiano: 2010, 2016

América de Natal

- Campeonato Potiguar: 2014

Chapecoense

- Copa Sudamericana: 2016 (posthumously)
