= 2017 CR Flamengo season =

Flamengo
2017 season
- Chairman: Eduardo Bandeira de Mello
- Head coach: Zé Ricardo (until 6 August); Reinaldo Rueda (since 13 August)
- Stadium: Ilha do Urubu
- Série A: 6th
- Campeonato Carioca: Winners
- Copa do Brasil: Runners-up
- Primeira Liga: Quarter-finals
- CONMEBOL Libertadores: Group stage
- CONMEBOL Sudamericana: Runners-up
- Top goalscorer: League: Diego (10); All: Paolo Guerrero (20)
- Highest home attendance: 66,165 vs Cruzeiro (in the Estádio do Maracanã)
- Lowest home attendance: 2,039 vs Portuguesa (RJ) (in the Estádio Raulino de Oliveira)
- Average home league attendance: 16,569 (Série A)
Home colours	Away colours	Third colours

The 2017 season is the 122nd year in the club's history, the 106th season in Clube de Regatas do Flamengo's football existence, and their 47th in the Brazilian Série A, having never been relegated from the top division.

After finishing 2016 Brazilian Série A in 3rd place Flamengo earned a spot to play CONMEBOL Libertadores Bridgestone 2017, returning to the South America top club competition since last played in 2014. The club will also play 2017 Rio de Janeiro State League, 2017 Primeira Liga and 2017 Copa do Brasil.

== Kits ==
Supplier: Adidas / Sponsor: Caixa / Back of the shirt: MRV / Lower back: YES! Idiomas / Shoulder: Universidade Brasil / Sleeves: Carabao / Numbers: TIM / Socks: Kodilar

Home	Home alternate	Away	Away alternate	Third	Goalkeeper	Goalkeeper alternate

== Club ==
=== First-team staff ===
As of 12 August 2017.

Position	Name
Head coach	(Colombia) Reinaldo Rueda
General Manager	(Brazil) Rodrigo Caetano
Executive Director	(Brazil) Carlos Mozer
Assistant coaches	(Brazil) Jayme de Almeida
Assistant coaches	(Colombia) Bernardo Redín
Goalkeeping coaches	(Brazil) Victor Hugo
Goalkeeping coaches	(Brazil) José Jober
Fitness coaches	(Brazil) Marcelo Martorelli
Fitness coaches	(Brazil) Daniel Gonçalves
Fitness coaches	(Brazil) Roberto Oliveira Junior
Fitness coaches	(Colombia) Carlos Eduardo Velasco
Medical Staff Manager	(Brazil) Marcio Tannure
Doctors	(Brazil) João Marcelo
Doctors	(Brazil) Gustavo Caldeira
Doctors	(Brazil) Luiz Claudio Baldi
Doctors	(Brazil) Serafim Borges
Physiologist	(Brazil) Felipe Olive
Physiotherapists	(Brazil) Mario Peixoto
Physiotherapists	(Brazil) Walteriano da Silva
Physiotherapists	(Brazil) Fred Manhães
Under-20 Head Coach	Vacant

=== Other information ===
Chairman	(Brazil) Eduardo Bandeira de Mello
Captain	Réver
Vice-captain	Juan
Third-captain	Diego
Ground (capacity and dimensions)	Estádio do Maracanã (78,838 / 105×68 meters)
Ground (capacity and dimensions)	Ilha do Urubu (20,113 / 105×68 meters)

Source: CBF

=== First-team squad ===
As of November 21, 2017

Note: Flags indicate national team as defined under FIFA eligibility rules; some limited exceptions apply. Players may hold more than one non-FIFA nationality.

No.	Pos.	Nation	Player
1	GK	BRA	Diego Alves
2	DF	BRA	Rodinei
4	DF	BRA	Juan
5	MF	BRA	Willian Arão
6	DF	BRA	Renê
7	MF	BRA	Everton Ribeiro
8	MF	BRA	Márcio Araújo
9	FW	PER	Paolo Guerrero
10	MF	BRA	Ederson
11	MF	ARG	Federico Mancuello
13	DF	PER	Miguel Trauco
15	DF	BRA	Réver
17	MF	BRA	Gabriel
19	MF	ARG	Darío Conca (on loan from Shanghai SIPG)
20	FW	BRA	Vinícius Jr.
21	DF	BRA	Pará
22	MF	BRA	Éverton

No.	Pos.	Nation	Player
23	FW	BRA	Geuvânio (on loan from Tianjin Quanjian F.C.)
26	MF	COL	Gustavo Cuéllar
27	MF	BRA	Rômulo
28	FW	COL	Orlando Berrío
29	FW	BRA	Lincoln
30	GK	BRA	Thiago
33	DF	BRA	Rafael Vaz
35	MF	BRA	Diego
38	GK	BRA	Alex Muralha
39	MF	BRA	Lucas Paquetá
42	MF	BRA	Matheus Sávio
43	DF	BRA	Léo Duarte
44	DF	BRA	Rhodolfo
45	GK	BRA	Gabriel Batista
47	FW	BRA	Felipe Vizeu
49	GK	BRA	César

Players with Dual Nationality

- (Brazil) (Italy) Diego
- (Brazil) (Italy) Ederson
- (Argentina) (Italy) Federico Mancuello
- (Brazil) (Italy) Rhodolfo

=== Reserves ===
Note: Flags indicate national team as defined under FIFA eligibility rules; some limited exceptions apply. Players may hold more than one non-FIFA nationality.

No.	Pos.	Nation	Player
50	GK	BRA	Yago Darub
52	DF	BRA	Rafael
53	MF	BRA	Matheus Dantas
54	FW	BRA	Loran
55	MF	BRA	Jean Lucas
56	DF	BRA	Moraes

No.	Pos.	Nation	Player
57	MF	BRA	Lucas Silva
58	DF	BRA	Kléber
59	DF	BRA	Matheus Thuler
60	DF	BRA	Pablo Maldini
–	GK	BRA	João Lopes

== Transfers ==
=== In ===
Date	Pos.	Name	From	Fee
17 July 2017	GK	(Brazil) Diego Alves	(Spain) Valencia	US$0,35m / €0,3m
11 June 2017	DF	(Brazil) Rhodolfo	(Turkey) Beşiktaş	US$1,2m / €1,1m
5 June 2017	MF	(Brazil) Éverton Ribeiro	(United Arab Emirates) Al-Ahli	US$6,7m / €6,0m
6 February 2017	DF	(Brazil) Renê	(Brazil) Sport	US$1,1m / €1,0m
27 January 2017	FW	(Colombia) Orlando Berrío	(Colombia) Atlético Nacional	US$3,5m / €3,3m
13 January 2017	MF	(Brazil) Rômulo	(Russia) Spartak Moscow	Free transfer
14 December 2016	DF	(Peru) Miguel Trauco	(Peru) Universitario	Free transfer
Total				US$12,85m / €11,7m

=== Out ===
Date	Pos.	Name	To	Fee
8 July 2017	GK	(Brazil) Paulo Victor	(Brazil) Grêmio	Released
5 July 2017	MF	(Brazil) Adryan	(Switzerland) Sion	Released
21 June 2017	DF	(Argentina) Alejandro Donatti	(Mexico) Club Tijuana	US$1,65m / €1,5m
26 January 2017	DF	(Brazil) Jorge	(France) Monaco	US$9,6m / €9m
11 January 2017	MF	(Argentina) Lucas Mugni	Free agent	Released
1 January 2017	FW	(Qatar) Emerson	Free agent	End of contract
1 January 2017	MF	(Brazil) Alan Patrick	(Ukraine) Shakhtar Donetsk	Loan return
1 January 2017	DF	(Brazil) Chiquinho	Free agent	End of contract
1 January 2017	FW	(Brazil) Fernandinho	(Brazil) Grêmio	Loan return
23 December 2016	FW	(Brazil) Igor Sartori	Free agent	Released
23 December 2016	MF	(Brazil) Recife	Free agent	Released
23 December 2016	MF	(Brazil) Rodolfo	Free agent	Released
23 December 2016	MF	(Brazil) Thomás	(Brazil) Santa Cruz	Released
Total				US$11,25m / €10,5m

=== Loan in ===
Date from	Date to	Pos.	Name	From
21 June 2017	31 December 2018	FW	(Brazil) Geuvânio	(China) Tianjin Quanjian F.C.
2 January 2017	31 December 2017	MF	(Argentina) Darío Conca	(China) Shanghai SIPG

=== Loan out ===
Date from	Date to	Pos.	Name	To
6 September 2017	31 December 2017	MF	(Brazil) Ronaldo	(Brazil) Atlético Goianiense
4 September 2017	31 December 2017	MF	(Brazil) Thiago Santos	(India) Mumbai City FC
10 August 2017	31 May 2018	MF	(Argentina) Héctor Canteros	(Brazil) Chapecoense
23 August 2017	31 December 2017	DF	(Brazil) Rafael Dumas	(Brazil) Paysandu
16 August 2017	31 December 2017	FW	(Brazil) Paulinho	(Brazil) Guarani
3 August 2017	31 May 2018	FW	(Brazil) Marcelo Cirino	(United Arab Emirates) Al Nasr
13 July 2017	31 December 2017	DF	(Brazil) Thiago Ennes	(Brazil) Cuiabá
13 June 2017	31 December 2017	DF	(Brazil) Cafu	(Brazil) Ceará
24 May 2017	31 December 2017	MF	(Brazil) Matheus Trindade	(Brazil) Osasco Audax
9 May 2017	31 December 2017	DF	(Brazil) Léo	(Brazil) Coritiba
27 April 2017	31 December 2017	MF	(Brazil) Jajá	(Brazil) Vila Nova
24 April 2017	2 August 2017	FW	(Brazil) Marcelo Cirino	(Brazil) Internacional
18 April 2017	22 August 2017	DF	(Brazil) Rafael Dumas	(Brazil) Luverdense
17 February 2017	31 December 2017	FW	(Brazil) Marcelo Cirino (Note: Despite the previous agreement Internacional forfeited the offer on 6 March 2017.)	(Brazil) Internacional
16 February 2017	31 December 2017	MF	(Brazil) Jajá	(Brazil) Tombense
31 January 2017	31 May 2017	DF	(Brazil) Thiago Ennes	(Portugal) União da Madeira
26 January 2017	2 June 2017	GK	(Brazil) Paulo Victor	(Turkey) Gaziantepspor
18 January 2017	31 December 2017	FW	(Brazil) Paulinho	(Brazil) Vitória
17 January 2017	31 December 2017	DF	(Brazil) Léo	(Brazil) Atlético Paranaense
16 January 2017	26 April 2017	MF	(Brazil) Luiz Antônio	(Brazil) Chapecoense
14 January 2017	17 April 2017	DF	(Brazil) Rafael Dumas	(Philippines) Global F.C.
11 January 2017	30 April 2017	FW	(Brazil) Nixon	(Brazil) Red Bull Brasil
4 January 2017	31 December 2017	FW	(Brazil) Daniel dos Anjos	(Brazil) Atlético Goianiense
1 January 2017	31 December 2017	MF	(Brazil) Gabriel Ramos	(Brazil) Cuiabá
1 January 2017	31 December 2017	MF	(Brazil) Jonas	(Brazil) Coritiba
29 December 2016	30 April 2017	GK	(Brazil) César	(Brazil) Ferroviária
22 December 2016	30 March 2017	MF	(Brazil) Matheus Trindade	(Brazil) Ceará
22 December 2016	31 December 2017	FW	(Brazil) Douglas Baggio	(Brazil) Ceará

== Statistics ==
=== Appearances and goals ===
Last updated on 13 December 2017.

- Players in italic have left the club during the season.

No.	Pos.	Player	Série A			Libertadores			Sudamericana			Copa do Brasil			Primeira Liga			Rio State League			Totals		
No.	Pos.	Player	GP	GS	Gs	GP	GS	Gs	GP	GS	Gs	GP	GS	Gs	GP	GS	Gs	GP	GS	Gs	GP	GS	Gs
1	GK	(Brazil) Diego Alves	19	19	0	0	0	0	5	5	0	0	0	0	0	0	0	0	0	0	24	24	0
2	DF	(Brazil) Rodinei	19	13	2	2	1	2	3	2	0	7	5	0	2	2	0	8	4	1	41	27	5
4	DF	(Brazil) Juan	13	13	0	1	0	0	9	9	2	6	6	0	2	2	0	4	2	1	35	32	3
5	DF	(Brazil) Willian Arão	30	26	1	6	6	1	10	10	3	6	5	0	1	1	0	14	14	4	67	62	9
6	DF	(Brazil) Renê	17	13	0	3	2	0	2	2	0	3	3	0	2	2	0	7	6	1	34	28	1
7	FW	(Brazil) Marcelo Cirino	0	0	0	1	0	0	0	0	0	0	0	0	0	0	0	3	0	0	4	0	0
7	MF	(Brazil) Everton Ribeiro	29	26	4	0	0	0	10	8	2	0	0	0	1	1	1	0	0	0	40	35	7
8	MF	(Brazil) Márcio Araújo	27	26	0	6	5	0	3	1	0	4	3	0	4	3	0	10	9	0	55	48	0
9	FW	(Peru) Paolo Guerrero	19	18	6	6	6	2	2	2	0	5	5	2	1	1	0	11	11	10	44	43	20
10	MF	(Brazil) Ederson	5	3	0	0	0	0	0	0	0	2	1	0	0	0	0	0	0	0	7	4	0
11	MF	(Argentina) Federico Mancuello	8	3	2	3	2	0	3	1	0	1	0	0	1	1	0	14	12	3	30	19	5
13	DF	(Peru) Miguel Trauco	23	22	1	6	6	2	7	7	0	4	4	0	1	1	0	12	12	1	53	52	4
15	DF	(Brazil) Réver	25	25	5	6	6	0	7	7	2	7	7	0	1	1	0	13	13	0	59	59	7
17	MF	(Brazil) Gabriel	6	3	0	6	4	1	1	0	0	3	1	0	4	3	1	10	4	0	30	15	2
18	FW	(Brazil) Leandro Damião	7	5	3	2	0	0	1	1	1	2	1	0	1	1	0	10	4	4	23	12	8
19	MF	(Argentina) Darío Conca	2	0	0	0	0	0	0	0	0	0	0	0	1	0	0	0	0	0	3	0	0
20	FW	(Brazil) Vinícius Jr.	25	4	3	0	0	0	7	0	1	4	0	0	1	1	0	0	0	0	37	5	4
21	DF	(Brazil) Pará	29	27	1	5	5	0	9	9	0	7	6	0	1	1	0	13	13	0	64	61	1
22	MF	(Brazil) Éverton	27	26	4	4	4	0	7	6	1	6	6	1	2	2	1	10	10	3	56	54	10
23	FW	(Brazil) Geuvânio	16	8	0	0	0	0	1	1	1	0	0	0	1	1	0	0	0	0	18	10	1
25	DF	(Argentina) Alejandro Donatti	0	0	0	1	1	0	0	0	0	0	0	0	2	2	0	5	5	0	8	8	0
26	MF	(Colombia) Gustavo Cuéllar	25	22	0	2	0	0	9	9	1	7	6	1	2	2	0	6	3	0	51	42	2
27	MF	(Brazil) Rômulo	8	3	0	4	3	1	1	0	0	2	0	0	2	2	0	9	9	0	26	17	1
28	FW	(Colombia) Orlando Berrío	19	8	2	3	1	0	4	3	1	6	6	1	2	1	1	12	5	1	46	24	6
29	FW	(Brazil) Lincoln	3	0	0	0	0	0	1	0	0	0	0	0	0	0	0	0	0	0	4	0	0
30	GK	(Brazil) Thiago	11	11	0	0	0	0	1	1	0	4	3	0	0	0	0	3	3	0	19	18	0
33	DF	(Brazil) Rafael Vaz	20	20	1	5	5	0	2	1	1	5	3	0	2	2	0	13	13	0	47	44	2
35	MF	(Brazil) Diego	27	24	10	3	3	2	8	8	1	6	6	1	1	1	0	8	8	4	53	50	18
36	MF	(Brazil) Cafu	0	0	0	0	0	0	0	0	0	0	0	0	2	0	0	3	2	0	5	2	0
37	MF	(Brazil) Adryan	0	0	0	0	0	0	0	0	0	0	0	0	2	1	0	2	2	0	4	3	0
38	GK	(Brazil) Alex Muralha	7	7	0	6	6	0	2	1	0	5	5	0	4	4	0	14	14	0	38	37	0
39	MF	(Brazil) Lucas Paquetá	17	10	1	0	0	0	9	4	2	3	2	1	2	1	0	6	2	2	37	18	6
40	MF	(Brazil) Thiago Santos	0	0	0	0	0	0	0	0	0	0	0	0	0	0	0	0	0	0	0	0	0
41	MF	(Brazil) Ronaldo	0	0	0	0	0	0	0	0	0	1	1	0	1	0	0	3	1	0	5	2	0
42	MF	(Brazil) Matheus Sávio	7	5	1	3	0	0	0	0	0	2	1	1	1	0	0	5	3	1	18	9	3
43	DF	(Brazil) Léo Duarte	2	1	0	0	0	0	0	0	0	0	0	0	2	1	0	2	1	0	6	3	0
44	DF	(Brazil) Rhodolfo	19	18	0	0	0	0	4	3	0	0	0	0	0	0	0	0	0	0	23	21	0
45	GK	(Brazil) Gabriel Batista	0	0	0	0	0	0	0	0	0	0	0	0	0	0	0	0	0	0	0	0	0
47	FW	(Brazil) Felipe Vizeu	18	8	2	0	0	0	8	6	5	2	1	0	2	2	0	8	3	2	38	20	9
49	GK	(Brazil) César	1	1	0	0	0	0	3	3	0	0	0	0	0	0	0	0	0	0	4	4	0
58	DF	(Brazil) Kléber	0	0	0	0	0	0	0	0	0	0	0	0	1	1	0	0	0	0	1	1	0
59	DF	(Brazil) Matheus Thuler	0	0	0	0	0	0	0	0	0	0	0	0	1	0	0	0	0	0	1	0	0

=== Top scorers ===
Includes all competitive matches

Rank	Nation	Number	Name	Série A	Libertadores	Sudamericana	Copa do Brasil	Primeira Liga	Rio State League	Total
1	(Peru)	9	Paolo Guerrero	6	2	0	2	0	10	20
2	(Brazil)	35	Diego	10	2	1	1	0	4	18
3	(Brazil)	22	Éverton	4	0	1	1	1	3	10
4	(Brazil)	5	Willian Arão	1	1	3	0	0	4	9
4	(Brazil)	47	Felipe Vizeu	2	0	5	0	0	2	9
6	(Brazil)	18	Leandro Damião	3	0	1	0	0	4	8
7	(Brazil)	7	Everton Ribeiro	4	0	2	0	1	0	7
7	(Brazil)	15	Réver	5	0	2	0	0	0	7
9	(Colombia)	28	Orlando Berrío	2	0	1	1	1	1	6
9	(Brazil)	39	Lucas Paquetá	1	0	2	1	0	2	5
11	(Brazil)	2	Rodinei	2	2	0	0	0	1	5
12	(Peru)	13	Miguel Trauco	1	2	0	0	0	1	4
12	(Argentina)	11	Federico Mancuello	1	0	0	0	0	3	4
12	(Brazil)	20	Vinícius Jr.	3	0	1	0	0	0	4
15	(Brazil)	42	Matheus Sávio	1	0	0	1	0	1	3
15	(Brazil)	4	Juan	0	0	2	0	0	1	3
17	(Brazil)	17	Gabriel	0	1	0	0	1	0	2
17	(Colombia)	26	Gustavo Cuéllar	0	0	1	1	0	0	2
17	(Brazil)	33	Rafael Vaz	1	0	1	0	0	0	2
20	(Brazil)	21	Pará	1	0	0	0	0	0	1
20	(Brazil)	27	Rômulo	0	1	0	0	0	0	1
20	(Brazil)	6	Renê	0	0	0	0	0	1	1
20	(Brazil)	23	Geuvânio	0	0	1	0	0	0	1
Own Goal				0	0	0	0	0	1	1
Total				49	11	24	8	4	33	135

=== Clean sheets ===
Includes all competitive matches

Rank	Nation	Number	Name	Série A	Libertadores	Sudamericana	Copa do Brasil	Primeira Liga	Rio State League	Total
1	(Brazil)	38	Alex Muralha	3	1	1	3	3	7	18
2	(Brazil)	1	Diego Alves	7	0	2	0	0	0	9
3	(Brazil)	30	Thiago	4	0	0	2	0	1	7
4	(Brazil)	49	César	0	0	1	0	0	0	1
5	(Brazil)	45	Gabriel Batista	0	0	0	0	0	0	0
Total				14	1	4	5	3	8	35

=== Disciplinary record ===
Position	Nation	Number	Name	Série A			Libertadores			Sudamericana			Copa do Brasil			Primeira Liga			Rio State League			Total		
Position	Nation	Number	Name	Booked	(yellow card) (red card)	Sent off (straight red)	Booked	(yellow card) (red card)	Sent off (straight red)	Booked	(yellow card) (red card)	Sent off (straight red)	Booked	(yellow card) (red card)	Sent off (straight red)	Booked	(yellow card) (red card)	Sent off (straight red)	Booked	(yellow card) (red card)	Sent off (straight red)	Booked	(yellow card) (red card)	Sent off (straight red)
GK	(Brazil)	1	Diego Alves	1	0	0	0	0	0	1	0	0	0	0	0	0	0	0	0	0	0	2	0	0
DF	(Brazil)	2	Rodinei	4	1	0	1	0	0	0	0	0	0	0	0	0	0	0	0	0	0	5	1	0
DF	(Brazil)	4	Juan	5	0	0	0	0	0	1	0	0	0	0	0	0	0	0	0	0	0	6	0	0
MF	(Brazil)	5	Willian Arão	2	0	0	0	0	0	1	0	0	0	0	0	0	0	0	2	0	0	5	0	0
DF	(Brazil)	6	Renê	3	0	0	0	0	0	0	0	0	0	0	0	0	0	0	0	0	0	3	0	0
FW	(Brazil)	7	Marcelo Cirino	0	0	0	0	0	0	0	0	0	0	0	0	0	0	0	0	0	0	0	0	0
MF	(Brazil)	7	Everton Ribeiro	2	0	0	0	0	0	3	0	0	0	0	0	0	0	0	0	0	0	5	0	0
MF	(Brazil)	8	Márcio Araújo	4	0	0	1	0	0	0	0	0	2	0	0	0	0	0	2	0	0	9	0	0
FW	(Peru)	9	Paolo Guerrero	4	0	0	1	0	0	1	0	0	4	0	0	0	0	0	3	0	0	13	0	0
MF	(Brazil)	10	Ederson	0	0	0	0	0	0	0	0	0	0	0	0	0	0	0	0	0	0	0	0	0
MF	(Argentina)	11	Federico Mancuello	2	0	0	2	0	0	0	0	0	0	0	0	0	0	0	3	0	0	7	0	0
DF	(Peru)	13	Miguel Trauco	5	1	0	1	0	0	1	0	0	0	0	0	0	0	0	4	0	0	11	1	0
DF	(Brazil)	15	Réver	3	0	0	1	0	0	1	0	0	0	0	0	0	0	0	0	0	0	5	0	0
FW	(Brazil)	17	Gabriel	2	0	0	0	0	0	0	0	0	0	0	0	0	0	0	2	0	0	4	0	0
FW	(Brazil)	18	Leandro Damião	0	0	0	0	0	0	0	0	0	0	0	0	0	0	0	1	0	0	1	0	0
MF	(Argentina)	19	Darío Conca	1	0	0	0	0	0	0	0	0	0	0	0	0	0	0	0	0	0	1	0	0
FW	(Brazil)	20	Vinícius Jr.	3	0	0	0	0	0	1	0	0	0	0	0	0	0	0	0	0	0	4	0	0
DF	(Brazil)	21	Pará	2	0	0	3	0	0	2	0	0	2	0	0	0	0	0	5	1	0	14	1	0
MF	(Brazil)	22	Éverton	6	0	0	0	0	0	2	0	0	1	0	0	0	0	0	6	1	0	15	1	0
FW	(Brazil)	23	Geuvânio	2	0	0	0	0	0	0	0	0	0	0	0	0	0	0	0	0	0	2	0	0
DF	(Argentina)	25	Alejandro Donatti	0	0	0	1	0	0	0	0	0	0	0	0	0	0	0	1	0	0	2	0	0
MF	(Colombia)	26	Gustavo Cuéllar	4	0	0	0	0	0	1	0	0	0	0	0	0	0	0	0	0	0	5	0	0
MF	(Brazil)	27	Rômulo	1	0	0	0	0	0	0	0	0	0	0	0	0	0	0	0	0	0	1	0	0
FW	(Colombia)	28	Orlando Berrío	4	0	0	0	0	1	0	0	0	1	0	0	0	0	0	0	0	0	5	0	1
FW	(Brazil)	29	Lincoln	1	0	0	0	0	0	0	0	0	0	0	0	0	0	0	0	0	0	1	0	0
GK	(Brazil)	30	Thiago	0	0	0	0	0	0	0	0	0	0	0	0	0	0	0	0	0	0	0	0	0
DF	(Brazil)	33	Rafael Vaz	1	0	0	1	0	0	0	0	0	0	0	0	0	0	0	1	0	0	3	0	0
MF	(Brazil)	35	Diego	6	0	0	1	0	0	3	0	0	1	0	0	1	0	0	1	0	0	13	0	0
MF	(Brazil)	36	Cafu	0	0	0	0	0	0	0	0	0	0	0	0	0	0	0	0	0	0	0	0	0
MF	(Brazil)	37	Adryan	0	0	0	0	0	0	0	0	0	0	0	0	0	0	0	0	0	0	0	0	0
GK	(Brazil)	38	Alex Muralha	0	0	0	1	0	0	0	0	0	1	0	1	0	0	0	0	0	0	2	0	1
MF	(Brazil)	39	Lucas Paquetá	3	0	0	0	0	0	2	0	0	0	0	0	0	0	0	1	0	0	6	0	0
MF	(Brazil)	40	Thiago Santos	0	0	0	0	0	0	0	0	0	0	0	0	0	0	0	0	0	0	0	0	0
MF	(Brazil)	41	Ronaldo	0	0	0	0	0	0	0	0	0	0	0	0	0	0	0	1	0	0	1	0	0
MF	(Brazil)	42	Matheus Sávio	0	0	0	0	0	0	0	0	0	0	0	0	0	0	0	0	0	0	0	0	0
FW	(Brazil)	43	Léo Duarte	0	0	0	0	0	0	0	0	0	0	0	0	0	0	0	0	0	0	0	0	0
DF	(Brazil)	44	Rhodolfo	3	0	0	0	0	0	1	0	0	0	0	0	0	0	0	0	0	0	4	0	0
GK	(Brazil)	45	Gabriel Batista	0	0	0	0	0	0	0	0	0	0	0	0	0	0	0	0	0	0	0	0	0
FW	(Brazil)	47	Felipe Vizeu	1	0	0	0	0	0	1	0	0	0	0	0	0	0	0	0	0	0	2	0	0
GK	(Brazil)	49	César	0	0	0	0	0	0	0	0	0	0	0	0	0	0	0	0	0	0	0	0	0
DF	(Brazil)	58	Kléber	0	0	0	0	0	0	0	0	0	0	0	0	0	0	0	0	0	0	0	0	0
DF	(Brazil)	59	Matheus Thuler	0	0	0	0	0	0	0	0	0	0	0	0	0	0	0	0	0	0	0	0	0
Total				77	2	0	14	0	1	22	0	0	12	0	1	2	0	0	33	2	0	160	4	2

=== Overview ===
Competition	First match	Last match	Starting round	Final position	Record							
Competition	First match	Last match	Starting round	Final position	Pld	W	D	L	GF	GA	GD	Win %
Campeonato Carioca	28 January 2017	7 May 2017	Matchday 1	Winners	17	12	5	0	39	12	+27	70.59
Campeonato Brasileiro Série A	13 May 2017	3 December 2017	Round 1	6th	38	15	11	12	49	38	+11	39.47
Primeira Liga	1 February 2017	3 September 2017	Group stage	Semifinals	4	2	2	0	4	1	+3	50.00
Copa do Brasil	10 May 2017	27 September 2017	Round of 16	Runners-up	8	3	4	1	8	6	+2	37.50
Copa Libertadores	8 March 2017	17 May 2017	Group stage	Group stage	6	3	0	3	11	7	+4	50.00
Copa Sudamericana	5 July 2017	13 December 2017	Second stage	Runners-up	10	6	3	1	24	9	+15	60.00
Total					83	41	25	17	135	73	+62	49.40

Source: Competitions

== Pre-season and friendlies ==
On 30 August 2016 Flamengo announced that would take part of 2017 Florida Cup, although on 12 December 2017 the club forfeit from the pre-season competition due to the reschedule of its pre-season training, instead the club would have all the preparation to the 2017 season in its recently opened training ground, Ninho do Urubu. The change was caused by the LaMia Flight 2933 accident with Chapecoense that forced change of dates in the end of 2016 Brazilian season.

On 11 January 2017 it was announced that the first pre-season match would be against Vila Nova, at Estádio Olímpico de Goiânia. On the next day it was confirmed that the match would be held at Estádio Serra Dourada.

=== Match(es) ===
21 January 2017 Friendly	Vila Nova	2–1	Flamengo	Goiânia
18:45	Wallyson 39', 78'	Report	Damião 66'	Stadium: Estádio Serra Dourada; Referee: Bruno Rezende

== Competitions ==
=== Rio State League (Campeonato Carioca) ===
==== Taça Guanabara ====
Group B
Pos	Team	Pld	W	D	L	GF	GA	GD	Pts	Qualification
1	Flamengo (Q)	5	5	0	0	17	2	+15	15	Qualified for Semifinals
2	Madureira (Q)	5	3	1	1	5	5	0	10	Qualified for Semifinals
3	Botafogo	5	2	1	2	7	8	−1	7	
4	Nova Iguaçu	5	1	3	1	5	7	−2	6	
5	Boavista	5	1	1	3	6	9	−3	4	
6	Macaé	5	0	0	5	3	12	−9	0	

Rules for classification: 1) points; 2) goal difference; 3) number of goals scored.
(Q) Qualified for the phase indicated

===== Matches =====
28 January 2017 1	Flamengo	4–1	Boavista	Natal
19:30	Guerrero 32', 61'; Trauco 54'; Diego 90'		Mosquito 41'	Stadium: Arena das Dunas; Attendance: 9,211; Referee: Leonardo da Silva Gavalheiro

1 February 2017 2	Flamengo	3–0	Macaé	Volta Redonda
19:30	Diego 43' (pen.); Aislan 46' (o.g.); Arão 51'; Éverton (yellow card) 32' (yellow card) 74' (red card)			Stadium: Estádio Raulino de Oliveira; Attendance: 9,829; Referee: Wagner do Nascimento Magalhães

4 February 2017 3	Nova Iguaçu	0–4	Flamengo	Rio de Janeiro
16:30			Mancuello 21', 57'; Guerrero 45', 76' (pen.)	Stadium: Estádio Moça Bonita; Attendance: 6.984

12 February 2017 4	Botafogo	1–2	Flamengo	Rio de Janeiro
19:30	Roger 39'		Guerrero 38'; Éverton 65'	Stadium: Estádio Nilton Santos; Attendance: 23,496; Referee: Bruno Arleu de Araújo

19 February 2017 5	Flamengo	4–0	Madureira	Volta Redonda
17:00	Diego 45'; Guerrero 66'; Mancuello 70'; Paquetá 84'		Moraes (yellow card) 16' (yellow card) 43' (red card)	Stadium: Estádio Raulino de Oliveira; Attendance: 6,276; Referee: João Batista de Arruda

==== Semifinal (Taça Guanabara) ====
25 February 2017	Flamengo	1–0	Vasco da Gama	Volta Redonda
17:00	Diego 41' (pen.)			Stadium: Estádio Raulino de Oliveira; Attendance: 6,979; Referee: Leonardo Garcia Cavaleiro

==== Final (Taça Guanabara) ====
5 March 2017	Fluminense	3–3 (4–2 p)	Flamengo	Rio de Janeiro
16:00	Silva 4'; Dourado 32' (pen.); Lucas 39'		Arão 7'; Éverton 22'; Guerrero 84'	Stadium: Estádio Olímpico Nilton Santos; Attendance: Wagner Nascimento Magalhães; Referee: 27,549

==== Taça Rio ====
Group B
Pos	Team	Pld	W	D	L	GF	GA	GD	Pts	Qualification
1	Botafogo (Q)	6	4	1	1	12	6	+6	13	Qualified for Semifinals
2	Flamengo (Q)	6	3	3	0	13	5	+8	12	Qualified for Semifinals
3	Nova Iguaçu	6	3	1	2	7	6	+1	10	
4	Boavista	6	1	2	3	8	10	−2	5	
5	Madureira	6	1	2	3	8	10	−2	5	
6	Macaé	6	0	2	4	6	13	−7	2	

Rules for classification: 1) points; 2) goal difference; 3) number of goals scored.
(Q) Qualified for the phase indicated

===== Matches =====
11 March 2017 1	Flamengo	5–1	Portuguesa (RJ)	Volta Redonda
18:30	Damião 19', 32', 36'; Juan 51'; Paquetá 90+3'		Marcão 35'	Stadium: Estádio Raulino de Oliveira; Attendance: 2,039; Referee: Lenilton Rodrigues Gomes Júnior

19 March 2017 2	Resende	0–1	Flamengo	Volta Redonda
19:00	Vizeu 90+2'			Stadium: Estádio Raulino de Oliveira; Attendance: 2,667; Referee: Marcelo de Lima Henrique

22 March 2017 3	Flamengo	3–0	Bangu	Volta Redonda
21:45	Renê 73'; Damião 84'; Sávio 88'			Stadium: Estádio Raulino de Oliveira; Attendance: 1,830; Referee: Elton Azevedo

25 March 2017 4	Flamengo	2–2	Vasco da Gama	Brasília
18:30	Arão 58'; Berrío 63'		Yago Pikachu 16'; Nenê 90' (pen.); Luís Fabiano (yellow card) 53' (yellow card) 53' (red card)	Stadium: Estádio Nacional; Attendance: 23,828; Referee: Luis Antônio Silva dos Santos

29 March 2017 5	Volta Redonda	1–1	Flamengo	Volta Redonda
21:45	Luan 62'		Vizeu 37'	Stadium: Estádio Raulino de Oliveira; Referee: Wagner Nascimento Magalhães

2 April 2017 6	Fluminense	1–1	Flamengo	Cariacica
16:00	Wendel		Arão 90'; Pará (yellow card) 50' (yellow card) 75' (red card)	Stadium: Estádio Kléber Andrade; Attendance: 11,927; Referee: Rodrigo Carvalhaes de Miranda

==== Semifinal (Taça Rio) ====
8 April 2017	Vasco da Gama	0–0	Flamengo	Rio de Janeiro
18:30				Stadium: Estádio do Maracanã; Attendance: Wagner do Nascimento Magalhaes; Referee: 24,616

==== Final stage ====
===== Semifinal =====
23 April 2017	Flamengo	2–1	Botafogo	Rio de Janeiro
16:00	Guerrero 49' 66' (pen.)		Sassá 88' (pen.)	Stadium: Estádio do Maracanã; Attendance: 20,853; Referee: Leonardo Garcia Cavaleiro

=== Final ===
30 April 2017 First leg	Fluminense	0–1	Flamengo	Rio de Janeiro
16:00			Éverton 34'	Stadium: Estádio do Maracanã; Attendance: 40,898; Referee: João Batista de Arruda

7 May 2017 Second leg	Flamengo	2–1 (3–1 agg.)	Fluminense	Rio de Janeiro
16:00	Guerrero 85'; Rodinei 90+4'		Dourado 4'; Cavalieri (red card) 90+2'	Stadium: Estádio do Maracanã; Attendance: 68,165; Referee: Wagner do Nascimento Magalhães

==== Average attendances ====
Includes all matches in the 2017 Campeonato Carioca.

Stadium	Matches	Average	Highest attendance	Lowest attendance
Arena das Dunas	1	9,211	9,211	9,211
Estádio Raulino de Oliveira	4	4,994	9,829	1,830
Estádio Nacional	1	23,828	23,828	23,828
Total	6	8,836	53,014	

=== Primeira Liga ===
On 30 December 2016 Primeira Liga announced the 2017 season schedule with Flamengo playing its first match against Grêmio.

==== Group stage ====
Pos	Team	Pld	W	D	L	GF	GA	GD	Pts	Qualification
1	Flamengo	3	2	1	0	3	0	+3	7	Qualifies to the Final stage
2	Grêmio	3	1	1	1	2	3	−1	4	Qualifies to the Final stage
3	Ceará	3	0	3	0	1	1	0	3	
4	América	3	0	1	2	0	2	−2	1	

==== Matches ====
8 February 2017 1	Flamengo	2–0	Grêmio	Brasília
19:30	Éverton 43'; Berrío 78'			Stadium: Estádio Nacional; Attendance: 20,222; Referee: Bráulio da Silva Machado

16 February 2017 3	Flamengo	1–0	América (MG)	Brasília
21:30	Gabriel 10'		Gérson Magrão (yellow card) 8' (yellow card) 47' (red card)	Stadium: Estádio Bezerrão; Attendance: 8,147; Referee: Rafael Traci

22 February 2017 2	Ceará	0–0	Flamengo	Fortaleza
19:30				Stadium: Castelão; Attendance: 17,075; Referee: Anderson Daronco

=== Quarterfinals ===
30 August 2017	Flamengo	1–1 (4–5 p)	Paraná	Cariacica
21:45	Ribeiro 64' (pen.)		Renatinho 66'	Stadium: Estádio Kléber Andrade; Attendance: 9,834; Referee: Renato Conceição

==== Average attendances ====
Includes all matches in the 2017 Primeira Liga.

Stadium	Matches	Average	Highest attendance	Lowest attendance
Estádio Nacional	1	20,222	20,222	20,222
Estádio Bezerrão	1	8,147	8,147	8,147
Estádio Kléber Andrade	1	9,834	9,834	9,834
Total	3	12,734	38,203	

=== Copa do Brasil ===
As Flamengo played in the 2017 CONMEBOL Libertadores, the club only entered the competition in the round of 16.

==== Round of 16 ====
10 May 2017 First leg	Flamengo	0–0	Atlético Goianiense	Rio de Janeiro
19:30				Stadium: Estádio do Maracanã; Attendance: 33,161; Referee: Jean Pierre Goncalves Lima

24 May 2017 Second leg	Atlético Goianiense	1–2 (1–2 agg.)	Flamengo	Goiânia
21:45	Jorginho 28'		Guerrero 13'; Sávio 80'	Stadium: Estádio Serra Dourada; Referee: Flavio Rodrigues De Souza

=== Quarterfinals ===
28 June 2017 First leg	Flamengo	2–0	Santos	Rio de Janeiro
21:45	Éverton 27'; Cuéllar 88'			Stadium: Ilha do Urubu; Attendance: 15,564; Referee: Ricardo Marques Ribeiro

26 July 2017 Second leg	Santos	4–2 (4–a4 agg.)	Flamengo	Santos
21:45	Bruno Henrique 34'; Copete 54', 90+4'; Ferraz 55'		Berrío 10'; Guerrero 46'	Stadium: Estádio Vila Belmiro; Attendance: 12,507; Referee: Leandro Vuaden

=== Semifinals ===
16 August 2017 First leg	Botafogo	0–0	Flamengo	Rio de Janeiro
21:45	Carli (yellow card) 59' (red card) 79'		Alex (red card)	Stadium: Estádio Nilton Santos; Attendance: 28,757; Referee: Anderson Daronco

23 August 2017 Second leg	Flamengo	1–0 (1–0 agg.)	Botafogo	Rio de Janeiro
21:45	Diego 70'			Stadium: Estádio do Maracanã; Attendance: 53,148; Referee: Wilton Pereira Sampaio

=== Final ===
7 September 2017 First leg	Flamengo	1–1	Cruzeiro	Rio de Janeiro
21:45	Paquetá 76'		De Arrascaeta 84'	Stadium: Estádio do Maracanã; Attendance: 66,165; Referee: Marcelo de Souza

27 September 2017 Second leg	Cruzeiro	0–0 (1–1 agg.) (5–3 p)	Flamengo	Belo Horizonte
21:45				Stadium: Estádio do Mineirão; Attendance: 61,017; Referee: Luiz Flávio de Oliveira

==== Average attendances ====
Includes all home matches in the 2017 Copa do Brasil.

Stadium	Matches	Average	Highest attendance	Lowest attendance
Estádio do Maracanã	3	43,155	66,165	33,161
Ilha do Urubu	1	15,564	15,564	15,564
Total	4	42,010	168,038	

=== Série A ===
==== League table ====
Pos	Team	Pld	W	D	L	GF	GA	GD	Pts	Qualification or relegation
4	Grêmio	38	18	8	12	55	36	+19	62	Qualification for Copa Libertadores group stage
5	Cruzeiro	38	15	12	11	47	39	+8	57	Qualification for Copa Libertadores group stage
6	Flamengo	38	15	11	12	49	38	+11	56	Qualification for Copa Libertadores group stage
7	Vasco da Gama	38	15	11	12	40	47	−7	56	Qualification for Copa Libertadores second stage
8	Chapecoense	38	15	9	14	47	49	−2	54	Qualification for Copa Libertadores second stage

Source: CBF
Rules for classification: 1) points; 2) wins; 3) goal difference; 4) goals scored; 5) head-to-head results; 6) least red cards received; 7) least yellow cards received; 8) draw.

==== Results summary ====
Overall								Home						Away					
Pld	W	D	L	GF	GA	GD	Pts	W	D	L	GF	GA	GD	W	D	L	GF	GA	GD
38	15	11	12	49	38	+11	56	10	6	3	32	13	+19	5	5	9	17	25	−8

Last updated: 4 December 2017.
Source: Competitive matches

==== Results by round ====
Round	1	2	3	4	5	6	7	8	9	10	11	12	13	14	15	16	17	18	19	20	21	22	23	24	25	26	27	28	29	30	31	32	33	34	35	36	37	38
Ground	H	A	A	H	A	A	H	A	H	A	H	A	H	A	H	H	A	A	H	A	H	H	A	H	H	A	H	A	H	A	H	A	H	A	A	H	H	A
Result	D	W	D	D	L	D	W	D	W	W	W	W	L	D	D	W	D	L	L	L	W	W	L	W	D	L	D	W	W	L	D	L	W	L	L	W	L	W
Position	8	3	10	12	14	15	11	11	8	3	3	2	4	4	4	4	5	5	5	7	5	5	5	5	7	7	7	7	6	7	7	7	7	7	7	6	6	6

Updated to match(es) played on 4 December 2017. Source: Matches
A = Away; H = Home; W = Win; D = Draw; L = Loss

==== Average attendances ====
Includes all home matches in the 2017 Série A.

Stadium	Matches	Average	Highest attendance	Lowest attendance
Ilha do Urubu	15	12,707	18,204	7,111
Estádio Raulino de Oliveira	1	10,577	10,577	10,577
Estádio do Maracanã	3	37,883	50,220	24,800
Total	19	16,569	314,812	

==== Matches ====
Goals and red cards are shown.

13 May 2017 1	Flamengo	1–1	Atlético Mineiro	Rio de Janeiro
16:00	Sávio 24'		Elias 59'	Stadium: Estádio do Maracanã; Attendance: 50,220; Referee: Jailson Macedo Freitas

20 May 2017 2	Atlético Goianiense	0–3	Flamengo	Goiânia
19:00			Éverton 41'; Damião 51'; Rodinei 65'	Stadium: Estádio Serra Dourada; Attendance: 8,957; Referee: Igor Benevenuto

28 May 2017 3	Atlético Paranaense	1–1	Flamengo	Curitiba
16:00	Heleno 56'		Mancuello 25'	Stadium: Arena da Baixada; Attendance: 22,350; Referee: Braulio da Silva Machado

4 June 2017 4	Flamengo	0–0	Botafogo	Volta Redonda
11:00				Stadium: Estádio Raulino de Oliveira; Attendance: 10,577; Referee: Dewson Fernando Freitas da Silva

9 June 2017 5	Sport	2–0	Flamengo	Recife
21:45	Osvaldo 54'; Thomás 82'			Stadium: Estádio Ilha do Retiro; Attendance: 12,617; Referee: Anderson Daronco

11 June 2017 6	Avaí	1–1	Flamengo	Florianópolis
16:00	Rômulo 56'; Marquinhos (red card) 84'		Damião 61'	Stadium: Estádio da Ressacada; Attendance: 13,446; Referee: Paulo Henrique Schleinch Vollkopf

14 June 2017 7	Flamengo	2–0	Ponte Preta	Rio de Janeiro
21:00	Réver 45+3'; Damião 59'			Stadium: Ilha do Urubu; Attendance: 13,981; Referee: Ricardo Marques Ribeiro

18 June 2017 8	Fluminense	2–2	Flamengo	Rio de Janeiro
16:00	Wendel 36'; Dourado 81' (pen.)		Diego 55'; Trauco 90+5'	Stadium: Estádio do Maracanã; Attendance: 37,962; Referee: Vinicius Gonçalves Dias Araujo

22 June 2017 9	Flamengo	5–1	Chapecoense	Rio de Janeiro
21:00	Diego 14', 79'; Guerrero 19', 75', 82'		Ramos 56'	Stadium: Ilha do Urubu; Attendance: 14,632; Referee: Leandro Bizzio Marinho

25 June 2017 10	Bahia	0–1	Flamengo	Salvador
18:30	Fonseca (yellow card) 24' (red card) 30'		Berrío	Stadium: Itaipava Arena Fonte Nova; Attendance: 22,271; Referee: Igor Benevenuto

2 July 2017 11	Flamengo	2–0	São Paulo	Rio de Janeiro
16:00	Guerrero 38'; Diego 42'			Stadium: Ilha do Urubu; Attendance: 17,302; Referee: Leandro Vuaden

9 July 2017 12	Vasco da Gama	0–1	Flamengo	Rio de Janeiro
16:00			Éverton 64'	Stadium: Estádio São Januário; Attendance: 19,622; Referee: Anderson Daronco

13 July 2017 13	Flamengo	0–1	Grêmio	Rio de Janeiro
19:30			Luan 25'	Stadium: Ilha do Urubu; Attendance: 18,204; Referee: Marcelo Aparecido de Souza

16 July 2017 14	Cruzeiro	1–1	Flamengo	Belo Horizonte
16:00	Sassá 60'		Éverton 54'	Stadium: Mineirão; Attendance: 43,480; Referee: Rodolpho Marques

19 July 2017 15	Flamengo	2–2	Palmeiras	Rio de Janeiro
21:45	Pará 8'; Guerrero 44'		Guedes 32'; Willian 43'	Stadium: Ilha do Urubu; Attendance: 15,106; Referee: Jaílson Macedo Freitas

23 July 2017 16	Flamengo	2–1	Coritiba	Rio de Janeiro
19:00	Berrío 7'; Ribeiro 90+1' (pen.)		Almeida 46'	Stadium: Ilha do Urubu; Attendance: 13,014; Referee: Braulio da Silva Machado

30 July 2017 17	Corinthians	1–1	Flamengo	São Paulo
16:00	Jô 22'		Réver 71'	Stadium: Arena Corinthians; Attendance: 45,110; Referee: Ricardo Marques Ribeiro

2 August 2017 18	Santos	3–2	Flamengo	São Paulo
21:45	Bruno Henrique 54'; Alison 85'; Oliveira 88'; Braz (yellow card) 87' (red card) 90+6'		Ribeiro 56'; Vizeu 67'; Rodinei (yellow card) 15' (red card) 73'	Stadium: Pacaembu Stadium; Attendance: 27,030; Referee: Eduardo Valadão

6 August 2017 19	Flamengo	0–2	Vitória	Rio de Janeiro
11:00	Yago 45'; Neílton 66' (pen.)			Stadium: Ilha do Urubu; Attendance: 18,133; Referee: Raphael Claus

13 August 2017 20	Atlético Mineiro	2–0	Flamengo	Belo Horizonte
16:00	Santos 16' (pen.); Moura 54'		Trauco (yellow card) 14' (red card) 52'	Stadium: Estádio Independência; Attendance: 11,031; Referee: Elmo Alves Resende Cunha

19 August 2017 21	Flamengo	2–0	Atlético Goianiense	Rio de Janeiro
19:00	Vinícius Jr. 56', 75'			Stadium: Ilha do Urubu; Attendance: 7,082; Referee: Rodolpho Marques

27 August 2017 22	Flamengo	2–0	Atlético Paranaense	Rio de Janeiro
16:00	Diego 17'; Arão 31'			Stadium: Ilha do Urubu; Attendance: 10,199; Referee: Marcelo de Souza

10 September 2017 23	Botafogo	2–0	Flamengo	Rio de Janeiro
19:00	Roger 56', 69'			Stadium: Estádio Nilton Santos; Attendance: 6,311; Referee: Ricardo Marques Ribeiro

17 September 2017 24	Flamengo	2–0	Sport	Rio de Janeiro
16:00	Guerrero 9'; Ribeiro 90+3'		Ribeiro (yellow card) 63' (red card) 63'	Stadium: Ilha do Urubu; Attendance: 9,029; Referee: Vinicius Gonçalves Dias Araujo

23 September 2017 25	Flamengo	1–1	Avaí	Rio de Janeiro
19:00	Rodinei 81'		Castro 18'	Stadium: Ilha do Urubu; Attendance: 9,584; Referee: Cláudio Francisco Lima e Silva

2 October 2017 26	Ponte Preta	1–0	Flamengo	Campinas
20:00	Jean Patrick 53'; Naldo (red card) 82'			Stadium: Estádio Moisés Lucarelli; Attendance: 11,133; Referee: Igor Benevenuto

12 October 2017 27	Flamengo	1–1	Fluminense	Rio de Janeiro
17:00	Réver 69'		Pará 53' (o.g.)	Stadium: Estádio do Maracanã; Attendance: 38,629; Referee: Luiz Flávio de Oliveira

15 October 2017 28	Chapecoense	0–1	Flamengo	Chapecó
17:00			Diego 80'	Stadium: Arena Condá; Attendance: 9,857; Referee: Dewson Fernando Silva

19 October 2017 29	Flamengo	4–1	Bahia	Rio de Janeiro
21:00	Réver 51', 77'; Diego 85' (pen.), 87'		Mendoza 69' (pen.)	Stadium: Ilha do Urubu; Attendance: 8,282; Referee: Marcelo de Souza

22 October 2017 30	São Paulo	2–0	Flamengo	São Paulo
17:00	Pratto 14'; Hernanes 40'			Stadium: Estádio do Pacaembu; Attendance: 32,965; Referee: Rafael Traci

28 October 2017 31	Flamengo	0–0	Vasco da Gama	Rio de Janeiro
19:00				Stadium: Estádio do Maracanã; Attendance: 24,800; Referee: Ricardo Marques Ribeiro

5 November 2017 32	Grêmio	3–1	Flamengo	Porto Alegre
17:00	Everton 70', 72'; Luan 82'		Ribeiro 47'	Stadium: Arena do Grêmio; Attendance: 19,963; Referee: Raphael Claus

8 November 2017 33	Flamengo	2–0	Cruzeiro	Rio de Janeiro
21:45	Éverton 37'; Vinícius Jr. 90+4'			Stadium: Ilha do Urubu; Attendance: 7,111; Referee: Leandro Bizzio

12 November 2017 34	Palmeiras	2–0	Flamengo	São Paulo
17:00	Deyverson 14', 36'			Stadium: Allianz Parque; Attendance: 27,831; Referee: Braulio da Silva Machado

16 November 2017 35	Coritiba	1–0	Flamengo	Curitiba
21:00	Reis 8'			Stadium: Estádio Couto Pereira; Attendance: 14,821; Referee: Raphael Claus

19 November 2017 36	Flamengo	3–0	Corinthians	Rio de Janeiro
17:00	Mancuello 21'; Diego 33' (pen.); Vizeu 45+1'			Stadium: Ilha do Urubu; Attendance: 13,491; Referee: Wagner Reway

26 November 2017 37	Flamengo	1–2	Santos	Rio de Janeiro
19:00	Paquetá 7'		Bruno Henrique 10'; Gomes 74'	Stadium: Ilha do Urubu; Attendance: 15,456

3 December 2017 38	Vitória	1–2	Flamengo	Salvador
17:00	Carlos Eduardo 40'; Sá (yellow card) 85' (red card) 90+2'		Vaz 75'; Diego 90+6' (pen.)	Stadium: Barradão; Attendance: 29,008; Referee: Dewson Fernando Silva

=== Copa Libertadores ===
The draw of the tournament was held on 21 December 2016, 20:00 PYST (UTC−3), at the CONMEBOL Convention Centre in Luque, Paraguay.

According to CONMEBOL historic rankings Flamengo was set on the pot number 3 and draw to the group 4 with San Lorenzo from Argentina (pot 1), Universidad Católica from Chile (pot 2) and fellow Brazilian club Atlético Paranaense, coming from the qualifying stages.

Although assembling a strong team aiming a strong result at Copa Libertadores, Flamengo had a disappointing campaign in the group stage. The club won all three matches at home with the highest attendance average of the competition, but lost all three away matches, including the last match in Buenos Aires against San Lorenzo suffering a goal in the injury time. Flamengo finished the group stage in third and earned a spot in the Copa Sudamericana second stage.

==== Group stage ====
Pos	Team	Pld	W	D	L	GF	GA	GD	Pts	Qualification
1	(Argentina) San Lorenzo	6	3	1	2	8	8	0	10	Round of 16
2	(Brazil) Atlético Paranaense	6	3	1	2	9	10	−1	10	Round of 16
3	(Brazil) Flamengo	6	3	0	3	11	7	+4	9	Copa Sudamericana
4	(Chile) Universidad Católica	6	1	2	3	8	11	−3	5	

Source: CONMEBOL

==== Matches ====
8 March 2017 1	Flamengo (Brazil)	4–0	(Argentina) San Lorenzo	Rio de Janeiro
21:45	Diego 48'; Trauco 62'; Rômulo 70'; Gabriel 87'			Stadium: Estádio do Maracanã; Attendance: 60,989; Referee: Andrés Cunha

15 March 2017 2	Universidad Católica (Chile)	1–0	(Brazil) Flamengo	Santiago
21:45	Silva 75'		Berrío (red card) 84'	Stadium: Estadio San Carlos de Apoquindo; Attendance: 14,000; Referee: Diego Haro

12 April 2017 3	Flamengo (Brazil)	2–1	(Brazil) Atlético Paranaense	Rio de Janeiro
21:45	Guerrero 7'; Diego 15'		Nikão 59'	Stadium: Estádio do Maracanã; Attendance: 58,588; Referee: Wilson Lamouroux

26 April 2017 4	Atlético Paranaense (Brazil)	2–1	(Brazil) Flamengo	Curitiba
21:45	Heleno 37'; Gedoz 89'		Arão 90'	Stadium: Arena da Baixada; Attendance: 36,519; Referee: José Argote

3 May 2017 5	Flamengo (Brazil)	3–1	(Chile) Universidad Católica	Rio de Janeiro
21:45	Rodinei 51'; Guerrero 73'; Trauco 86'		Silva 67'	Stadium: Estádio do Maracanã; Attendance: 61,353; Referee: Victor Carrillo

17 May 2017 6	San Lorenzo (Argentina)	2–1	(Brazil) Flamengo	Buenos Aires
21:45	Rodinei 14'		Angeleri 75'; Belluschi 90+2'	Stadium: El Nuevo Gasómetro; Referee: Enrique Cáceres

==== Average attendances ====
Includes all home matches in the 2017 Copa Libertadores.

Stadium	Matches	Average	Highest attendance	Lowest attendance
Estádio do Maracanã	3	60,310	61,353	58,588
Total	3	60,310	180,930	

=== Second stage ===
5 July 2017 First leg	Palestino (Chile)	2–5	(Brazil) Flamengo	Santiago
21:45	Romo 49'; Vidal 56'		Réver 46'; Berrío 58'; Damião 60'; Vaz 81'; Ribeiro 88' (pen.)	Stadium: Estadio San Carlos de Apoquindo; Referee: Fernando Rapallini

9 August 2017 Second leg	Flamengo (Brazil)	5–0 (10–2 agg.)	(Chile) Palestino	Rio de Janeiro
21:45	Vizeu 4'; Geuvânio 10'; Ribeiro 42'; Arão 44'; Vinícius Jr. 73'			Stadium: Ilha do Urubu; Attendance: 6,074; Referee: Andrés Rojas

=== Round of 16 ===
13 September 2017 First leg	Chapecoense (Brazil)	0–0	(Brazil) Flamengo	Chapecó
19:15				Stadium: Arena Condá; Attendance: 9,702; Referee: Gery Vargas

20 September 2017 Second leg	Flamengo (Brazil)	4–0 (4–0 agg.)	(Brazil) Chapecoense	Rio de Janeiro
19:15	Cuéllar 7'; Arão 22'; Juan 63'; Paquetá 89'			Stadium: Ilha do Urubu; Attendance: 12,039; Referee: M. Espinoza

=== Quarterfinals ===
25 October 2017 First leg	Flamengo (Brazil)	1–0	(Brazil) Fluminense	Rio de Janeiro
21:45	Éverton 27'			Stadium: Estádio do Maracanã; Attendance: 30,945; Referee: Mario de Vivar

1 November 2017 Second leg	Fluminense (Brazil)	3–3 (3–4 agg.)	(Brazil) Flamengo	Rio de Janeiro
21:45	Lucas 3'; Chaves 41', 55'		Diego 10'; Vizeu 68'; Arão 84'	Stadium: Estádio do Maracanã; Attendance: 41,087; Referee: Patricio Loustau

=== Semifinals ===
23 November 2017 First leg	Flamengo (Brazil)	2–1	(Colombia) Junior	Rio de Janeiro
21:45	Juan 76'; Vizeu 82'		Gutiérrez 21'	Stadium: Estádio do Maracanã; Attendance: 41,804; Referee: José Argote

30 November 2017 Second leg	Junior (Colombia)	0–2 (1–4 agg.)	(Brazil) Flamengo	Barranquilla
22:30			Vizeu 50', 90+2'	Stadium: Estadio Metropolitano Roberto Meléndez; Attendance: 38,454; Referee: Roberto Tobar

=== Final ===
6 December 2017 First leg	Independiente (Argentina)	2–1	(Brazil) Flamengo	Buenos Aires
21:45	Gigliotti 29'; Meza 53'		Réver 9'	Stadium: Estadio Libertadores de América; Attendance: 45,000; Referee: Mario Díaz de Vivar

13 December 2017 Second leg	Flamengo (Brazil)	1–1 (2–3 agg.)	(Argentina) Independiente	Rio de Janeiro
21:45	Paquetá 30'		Barco 40' (pen.)	Stadium: Estádio do Maracanã; Attendance: 62,567; Referee: Wilmar Roldán

==== Average attendances ====
Includes all home matches in the 2017 Copa Sudamericana.

Stadium	Matches	Average	Highest attendance	Lowest attendance
Ilha do Urubu	2	9,057	12,039	6,074
Estádio do Maracanã	3	45,105	62,567	30,945
Total	5	30,686	153,429	

== Honors ==
=== Individuals ===
Name	Number	Country	Award
Paolo Guerrero	9	(Peru)	Rio de Janeiro State League Best eleven Rio de Janeiro State League Top scorer
Miguel Trauco	13	(Peru)	Rio de Janeiro State League Best eleven
Réver	15	(Brazil)	Rio de Janeiro State League Best eleven
Diego	35	(Brazil)	Rio de Janeiro State League Best eleven Copa do Brasil Best player

== Club Ranking ==
Flamengo position on the Club World Ranking during the 2017 season, according to clubworldranking.com.

Month	Position	Movement
January	40	–
February	36	(substituted on) 4
March	33	(substituted on) 3
April	28	(substituted on) 5
May	18	(substituted on) 10
June	18	–
July	24	(substituted off) 6
August	18	(substituted on) 6
September	22	(substituted off) 4
October	17	(substituted on) 5
November	9	(substituted on) 8
December	9	–

Last updated: 1 January 2018.
Source: IFFHS
