= Ronaldo (footballer, born October 1996) =

Brazilian footballer

Personal information
- Full name: Ronaldo da Silva Souza
- Date of birth: 23 October 1996 (age 30)
- Place of birth: Itu, Brazil
- Height: 1.79 m (5 ft 10 in)
- Position: Midfielder

Team information
- Current team: Internacional
- Number: 16

Youth career
- 2010–2012: Paulista
- 2013–2016: Flamengo

Senior career*
Years	Team	Apps	(Gls)
2015–2021	Flamengo	4	(0)
2017	→ Atlético Goianiense (loan)	9	(1)
2019–2021	→ Bahia (loan)	40	(0)
2021–2023	Shimizu S-Pulse	69	(1)
2024	Juventude	13	(2)
2025–	Internacional	39	(1)
- * Club domestic league appearances and goals as of 8 April 2026

Ronaldo da Silva Souza (born on 23 October 1996), better known as Ronaldo, is a Brazilian professional footballer who plays as a defensive midfielder for Campeonato Brasileiro Série A club Internacional.

== Career ==
=== Flamengo ===
Born in Itu, São Paulo, Ronaldo joined Flamengo's youth setup in 2013, from Paulista. He made his first team – and Série A – debut on 1 November 2015, coming on as a late substitute for Jajá in a 2–0 away loss against Grêmio.

On 19 April 2016, after impressing with the under-20s in the year's Copa São Paulo de Futebol Júnior, Ronaldo renewed his contract until 2020. He was rarely used in the following two campaigns, and was loaned to fellow top-tier side Atlético Goianiense on 5 September 2017, until the end of the year.

==== Atlético Goianiense (loan) ====
Ronaldo scored his first professional goal on 17 September 2017, netting his team's third in a 3–1 away win against Ponte Preta. After contributing with one goal in nine appearances for Dragão, he returned to Fla ahead of the 2018 campaign, but again featured rarely.

==== Bahia (loan) ====
On 9 July 2019, Ronaldo was loaned to Série A club Bahia through the end of the year.

=== Shimizu S-Pulse ===
After the end of contract with Flamengo, Ronaldo became a free agent and signed with J1 League club Shimizu S-Pulse on 1 July 2021.

=== Back to Brazil ===
In 2024, Ronaldo played for Juventude. And in 2025, he signed for SC Internacional a two-year contract.

== Career statistics ==
As of 2 December 2023

Appearances and goals by club, season and competition
Club	Season	League			State League		National cup		League cup		Continental		Other		Total	
Club	Season	Division	Apps	Goals	Apps	Goals	Apps	Goals	Apps	Goals	Apps	Goals	Apps	Goals	Apps	Goals
Flamengo	2015	Série A	1	0	—		—		—		—		—		1	0
Flamengo	2016	Série A	0	0	1 (Note: Appearance(s) in Campeonato Carioca)	0	0	0	—		1 (Note: Appearance(s) in Copa Sudamericana)	0	—		2	0
Flamengo	2017	Série A	0	0	3	0	1	0	—		—		1 (Note: Appearance(s) in Primeira Liga)	0	5	0
Flamengo	2018	Série A	0	0	4	0	—		—		—		—		4	0
Flamengo	2019	Série A	3	0	8	0	1	0	—		1 (Note: Appearance(s) in Copa Libertadores)	0	—		13	0
Flamengo	Total		4	0	16	0	2	0	0	0	2	0	1	0	25	0
Atlético Goianiense (loan)	2017	Série A	9	1	—		—		—		—		—		9	1
Bahia (loan)	2019	Série A	14	0	—		—		—		—		—		14	0
Bahia (loan)	2020	Série A	26	0	4 (Note: Appearance(s) in Campeonato Baiano)	0	0	0	—		3 (Note: Appearance(s) in Copa Sudamericana)	0	5 (Note: Appearance(s) in Copa do Nordeste)	1	38	1
Bahia (loan)	Total		40	0	4	0	0	0	0	0	3	0	5	1	52	1
Shimizu S-Pulse	2021	J1 League	11	0	—		1	0	—		—		—		12	0
Shimizu S-Pulse	2022	J1 League	19	1	—		0	0	0	0	—		—		19	1
Shimizu S-Pulse	2023	J2 League	39	0	—		1	0	2	0	—		2 (Note: Appearance(s) in J1 League play-off)	0	44	0
Shimizu S-Pulse	Total		69	1	0	0	2	0	2	0	0	0	2	0	75	1
Career total			122	2	20	0	4	0	2	0	5	0	8	1	161	3

== Honours ==
Flamengo

- Campeonato Carioca: 2017, 2019

Bahia

- Campeonato Baiano: 2020

Internacional

- Campeonato Gaúcho: 2025
- Recopa Gaúcha: 2026
