= Tico (footballer, born 2006) =

Brazilian footballer

Personal information
- Full name: Paulo Sérgio da Costa Evangelista Júnior
- Date of birth: 21 September 2006 (age 20)
- Place of birth: Terra Alta, Brazil
- Height: 1.63 m (5 ft 4 in)
- Position: Winger

Team information
- Current team: Remo
- Number: 61

Youth career
- 2022–: Remo
- 2025: → Atlético Piauiense (loan)

Senior career*
| Years | Team | Apps | (Gls) |
| 2025– | Remo | 2 | (0) |
- * Club domestic league appearances and goals as of 16:19, 24 July 2026 (UTC)

Paulo Sérgio da Costa Evangelista Júnior (born 21 September 2006), commonly known as Tico, is a Brazilian footballer who plays as a winger for Remo.

== Career ==
Born in Terra Alta, Pará, Tico started to appear in the youth sides of Remo in 2022. In January 2025, after impressing with the under-20s in the 2025 Copa São Paulo de Futebol Júnior, he was promoted to the first team for trainings.

Tico made his senior debut on 9 February 2025, coming on as a late substitute for Felipe Vizeu in a 3–0 Campeonato Paraense away win over Tuna Luso. However, he failed to appear with the side in the remainder of the year, being loaned out to Atlético Piauiense.

Back to Remo for the 2026 campaign, Tico made his Série A debut on 23 July 2026, replacing Jajá Silva late into a 3–0 loss at Corinthians.

== Career statistics ==
As of 24 July 2026

| Club | Season | League | | | State League | | Cup | | Continental | | Other | | Total | |
| Club | Season | Division | Apps | Goals | Apps | Goals | Apps | Goals | Apps | Goals | Apps | Goals | Apps | Goals |
|---|---|---|---|---|---|---|---|---|---|---|---|---|---|---|
| Remo | 2025 | Série B | — | | 1 | 0 | — | | — | | — | | 1 | 0 |
| Remo | 2026 | Série A | 1 | 0 | 1 | 0 | 0 | 0 | — | | 3 (Note: Appearance(s) in Copa Norte) | 0 | 5 | 0 |
| Career total | | | 1 | 0 | 2 | 0 | 0 | 0 | 0 | 0 | 3 | 0 | 6 | 0 |
