= Orlando Berrío =

Colombian footballer (born 1991)

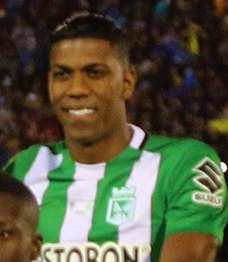
- Berrío with Atlético Nacional in 2016

Personal information
- Full name: Orlando Enrique Berrío Meléndez
- Date of birth: 14 February 1991 (age 35)
- Place of birth: Cartagena, Colombia
- Height: 1.82 m (6 ft 0 in)
- Positions: Right winger; right back

Team information
- Current team: PVF-CAND B
- Number: 9

Youth career
- 2007: Expreso Rojo
- 2008: Atlético Nacional

Senior career*
Years	Team	Apps	(Gls)
2009–2016	Atlético Nacional	126	(24)
2012	→ Millonarios (loan)	12	(0)
2012–2013	→ Patriotas (loan)	17	(4)
2017–2020	Flamengo	44	(3)
2020–2021	Khor Fakkan	0	(0)
2021–2022	América Mineiro	2	(0)
2022	Águilas Doradas	14	(1)
2023	Qingdao West Coast	3	(0)
2024	Tacuary	16	(2)
2025–	PVF-CAND B	1	(0)

International career^{‡}
2010	Colombia U20		
2016–2019	Colombia	6	(0)
- * Club domestic league appearances and goals as of 21 September 2025 ‡ National team caps and goals as of 11 September 2019

Orlando Enrique Berrío Meléndez (born 14 February 1991) is a Colombian professional footballer who plays as a winger or forward for V.League 2 club PVF-CAND B. He also represented Colombia national football team in six international appearances.

== Club career ==
Born in Cartagena, Berrío played for Expreso Rojo and Atlético Nacional as a youth. He made his first team – and Categoría Primera A – debut on 22 February 2009, starting in a 0–1 home loss against Deportes Quindío.

Berrío scored his first professional goal on 8 April 2010, in a 2–0 home win against América de Cali. Three days later, he netted a brace in an away success over Cortuluá, for the same scoreline.

Sparingly used, Berrío was loaned to fellow top-tier club Millonarios on 3 January 2012. On 3 August 2012, after failing to score a single goal for the club, he was loaned to Patriotas for one year.

Returning to Nacional, Berrío was regularly utilized by new manager Juan Carlos Osorio.

=== Flamengo ===
On 27 January 2017, Flamengo agreed to pay US$3.5 million to Atlético Nacional to sign Berrío. Berrío debuted for Flamengo in a Primeira Liga match against Grêmio on 8 February 2017, replacing Federico Mancuello in the 62nd minute and scoring his first goal for his new club in the 78th minute, while Flamengo won 2–0.

On 22 October 2017, in a Brazilian Série A match against São Paulo at Pacaembu Stadium, Berrío suffered a knee injury that later was confirmed as an anterior cruciate ligament injury. In the same week, he underwent surgery, causing him to miss the rest of the 2017 season.

=== Khor Fakkan ===
On 19 July 2020, Berrío signed with Khor Fakkan.

=== América Mineiro ===
After spending an entire year without playing at Khor Fakkan, Berrío signed with América Mineiro on 12 July 2021.

=== Águilas Doradas ===
On 16 August 2022, Berrío returned to Colombia and signed a with Categoría Primera A side Águilas Doradas.

=== Qingdao West Coast ===
On 18 April 2023, Berrío joined China League One club Qingdao West Coast.

=== Tacuary ===
On 25 January 2024, Berrío joined Paraguayan Primera División club Tacuary.

=== PVF-CAND B ===
In September 2025, Berrío moved to Vietnam signing for PVF-CAND B in the V.League 2.

== International career ==
In August 2016, Berrío was named in Colombia's squad for 2018 FIFA World Cup qualifiers against Venezuela and Brazil. He did not play in either match, and only made his full international debut on 6 October, coming on as a substitute for Juan Cuadrado in a 1–0 away win against Paraguay.

== Career statistics ==
=== Club ===
As of match played 21 September 2025.

Appearances and goals by club, season and competition
Club	Season	League			State League		Cup		Continental		Other		Total	
Club	Season	Division	Apps	Goals	Apps	Goals	Apps	Goals	Apps	Goals	Apps	Goals	Apps	Goals
Atlético Nacional	2009	Categoría Primera A	22	0	—		0	0	—		—		22	0
Atlético Nacional	2010	Categoría Primera A	11	5	—		0	0	—		—		11	5
Atlético Nacional	2011	Categoría Primera A	10	0	—		4	0	—		—		14	0
Atlético Nacional	2013	Categoría Primera A	16	4	—		2	1	1 (Note: Appearance(s) in Copa Sudamericana.)	0	—		19	5
Atlético Nacional	2014	Categoría Primera A	13	2	—		6	1	8 (Note: Four appearances and one goal in Copa Libertadores, four appearances and one goal in Copa Sudamericana.)	2	2 (Note: Appearance(s) in Superliga Colombiana.)	0	29	5
Atlético Nacional	2015	Categoría Primera A	30	4	—		2	0	4 (Note: Appearance(s) in Copa Libertadores.)	0	—		36	4
Atlético Nacional	2016	Categoría Primera A	24	9	—		4	2	21 (Note: Twelve appearances and four goals in Copa Libertadores, nine appearances and two goals in Copa Sudamericana.)	6	1	0	50	17
Atlético Nacional	Total		126	24	—		18	4	34	8	3	0	181	36
Millonarios (loan)	2012	Categoría Primera A	12	0	—		5	0	—		—		17	0
Patriotas (loan)	2012	Categoría Primera A	10	2	—		—		—		—		10	2
Patriotas (loan)	2013	Categoría Primera A	7	2	—		3	1	—		—		10	3
Patriotas (loan)	Total		17	4	—		3	1	—		—		20	5
Flamengo	2017	Série A	19	2	12	1	6	1	7 (Note: Three appearances in Copa Libertadores, four appearances and one goal in Copa Sudamericana.)	1	2 (Note: Appearance(s) in Primeira Liga.)	1	46	6
Flamengo	2018	Série A	9	0	0	0	0	0	0	0	0	0	9	0
Flamengo	2019	Série A	16	1	2	0	2	0	3	0	1 (Note: Appearance(s) in FIFA Club World Cup.)	0	24	1
Flamengo	2020	Série A	—		2	0	0	0	0	0	—		2	0
Flamengo	Total		44	3	16	1	8	1	10	1	3	1	81	7
América Mineiro	2021	Série A	2	0	0	0	0	0	—		—		2	0
Águilas Doradas	2022	Primera A	14	1	—		0	0	—		—		14	1
Qingdao West Coast	2023	China League One	3	0	—		1	0	—		—		4	0
Tacuary	2024	Paraguayan Primera División	16	2	—		1	0	—		—		17	2
PVF-CAND B	2025–26	V.League 2	1	0	—		—		—		—		1	0
Career total			235	34	16	1	36	6	44	9	6	1	337	51

=== International ===
As of 9 September 2019

Colombia
Year	Apps	Goals
2016	3	0
2017	1	0
2019	2	0
Total	6	0

== Honours ==
=== Club ===
Atlético Nacional

- Categoría Primera A: 2011–I, 2013–II, 2014–I, 2015–II
- Copa Colombia: 2013, 2016
- Superliga Colombiana: 2016
- Copa Libertadores: 2016

Flamengo

- Campeonato Brasileiro Série A: 2019
- Campeonato Carioca: 2017, 2019, 2020
- Copa Libertadores: 2019
- Supercopa do Brasil: 2020
- Recopa Sudamericana: 2020
