= Alex Muralha =

Brazilian footballer (born 1989)

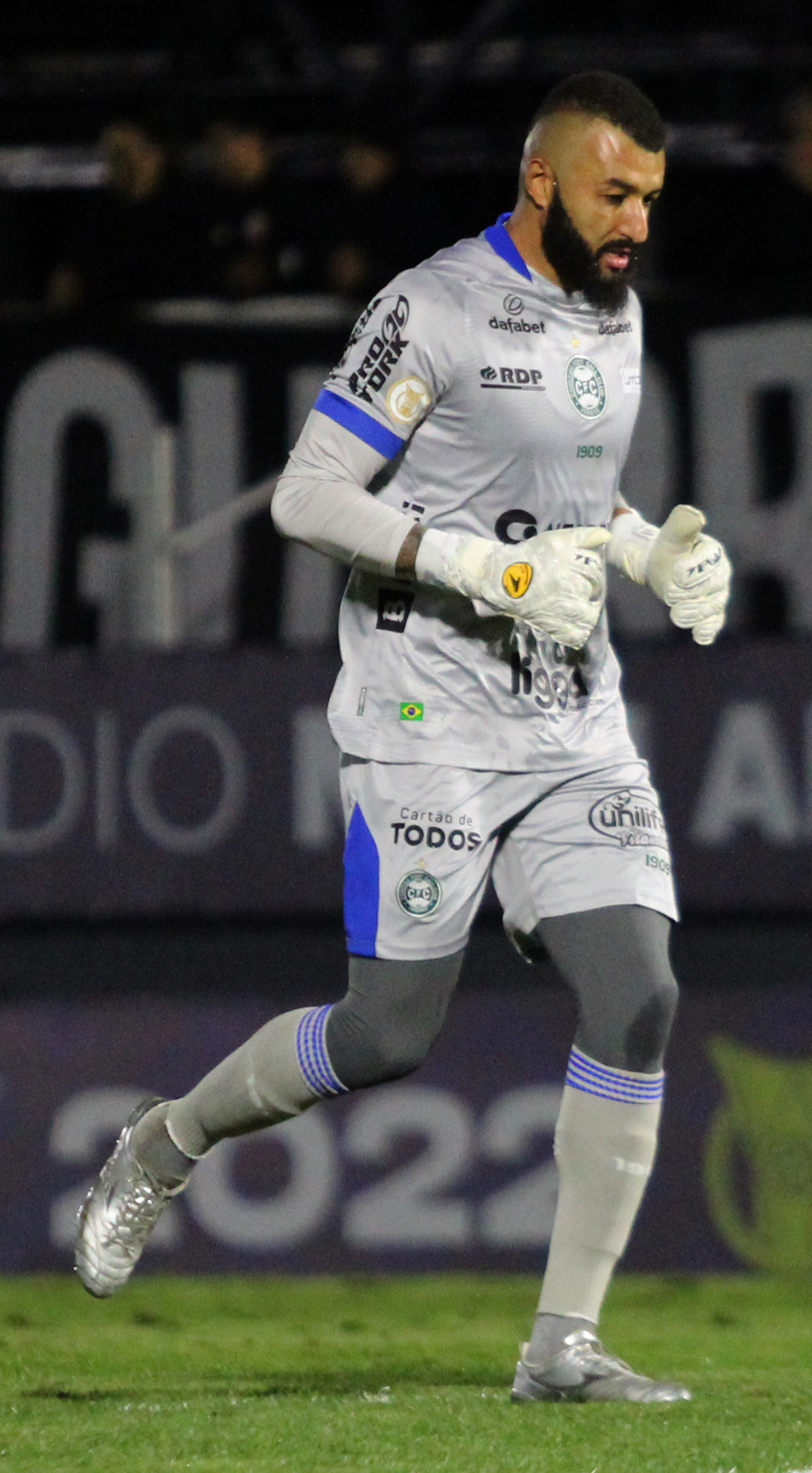

Personal information
- Full name: Alex Roberto Santana Rafael
- Date of birth: 10 November 1989 (age 37)
- Place of birth: Três Corações, Brazil
- Height: 1.88 m (6 ft 2 in)
- Position: Goalkeeper

Team information
- Current team: Mirassol
- Number: 23

Youth career
- 2007–2008: Paraná

Senior career*
Years	Team	Apps	(Gls)
2008	Serrano-PR		
2009–2010	Olé Brasil	4	(0)
2010	→ Votoraty (loan)	13	(0)
2011–2013	Comercial-SP	61	(0)
2012	→ Oeste (loan)	0	(0)
2013	→ Cuiabá (loan)	0	(0)
2013	→ Shonan Bellmare (loan)	12	(0)
2014	Mirassol	18	(0)
2014–2015	Figueirense	51	(0)
2016–2021	Flamengo	52	(0)
2018	→ Albirex Niigata (loan)	28	(0)
2019–2021	→ Coritiba (loan)	48	(0)
2021	Mirassol	14	(0)
2021–2023	Coritiba	36	(0)
2023	→ Mirassol (loan)	46	(0)
2024–	Mirassol	67	(0)
- * Club domestic league appearances and goals as of 13 December 2025

Alex Roberto Santana Rafael (born 10 November 1989), sometimes known as Alex Muralha, is a Brazilian footballer who plays as a goalkeeper for Mirassol.

== Club career ==
=== Figueirense ===
In April 2014 Alex signed with Figueirense in a free transfer.

=== Flamengo ===
After an impressive 2015 season, Flamengo signed with Alex from Figueirense in a R$4 million transfer fee on 2 January 2016. The club expected him to make an instant impact, although stayed as the backup goalkeeper until Paulo Victor suffered an injury in June. Since then he took the starter position and impressed Brazil coach Tite receiving his first call up.

On 28 December 2016 Alex signed another two-year contract with Flamengo until December 2018.

==== Coritiba (loan) ====
On 6 March 2019, he joined Coritiba on loan from Flamengo until December 2019.

== International career ==
On 16 September 2016 he was called up to the Brazil national team for the first time to play 2018 FIFA World Cup qualifying matches against Bolivia and Venezuela.

== Club statistics ==
As of 19 January 2024.

Appearances and goals by club, season and competition
Club	Season	League			State league (Note: Includes Campeonato Paulista Segunda Divisão, Campeonato Paulista Série A2, Campeonato Paulista, Campeonato Catarinense, Campeonato Carioca, Campeonato Paranaense)		Cup (Note: Includes Copa do Brasil, Emperor's Cup)		Continental		Other		Total	
Club	Season	Division	Apps	Goals	Apps	Goals	Apps	Goals	Apps	Goals	Apps	Goals	Apps	Goals
Olé Brasil	2009	Paulista 2ª Divisão	—		4	0	—		—		—		4	0
Votoraty	2010	Paulista A2	—		13	0	3	0	—		—		16	0
Comercial-SP	2011	Paulista A2	—		18	0	—		—		26 (Note: Appearance(s) in Copa Paulista)	0	44	0
Comercial-SP	2012	Paulista	—		19	0	—		—		8	0	27	0
Comercial-SP	2013	Paulista A2	—		24	0	—		—		—		24	0
Comercial-SP	Total		—		61	0	—		—		34	0	95	0
Oeste (loan)	2012	Série C	0	0	—		—		—		—		0	0
Cuiabá (loan)	2013	Série C	0	0	—		—		—		—		0	0
Shonan Bellmare (loan)	2013	J.League Division 1	12	0	—		1	0	—		—		13	0
Mirassol	2014	Paulista A2	—		18	0	—		—		—		18	0
Figueirense	2014	Série A	0	0	—		0	0	—		—		0	0
Figueirense	2015	Série A	35	0	16	0	9	0	—		—		60	0
Figueirense	Total		35	0	16	0	9	0	—		—		60	0
Flamengo	2016	Série A	33	0	1	0	0	0	3 (Note: Appearance(s) in Copa Sudamericana)	0	—		37	0
Flamengo	2017	Série A	7	0	14	0	5	0	8 (Note: Six appearances in Copa Libertadores and two appearances in Copa Sudamericana)	0	4 (Note: Appearance(s) in Primeira Liga)	0	38	0
Flamengo	Total		40	0	15	0	5	0	11	0	4	0	75	0
Albirex Niigata (loan)	2018	J2 League	28	0	—		0	0	—		1 (Note: Appearance(s) in J.League Cup)	0	29	0
Coritiba (loan)	2019	Série B	28	0	7	0	—		—		—		35	0
Coritiba (loan)	2020	Série A	0	0	13	0	1	0	—		—		14	0
Coritiba (loan)	Total		28	0	20	0	1	0	0	0	—		49	0
Mirassol	2021	Série C	0	0	14	0	1	0	—		—		15	0
Coritiba	2021	Série B	2	0	—		—		—		—		2	0
Coritiba	2022	Série A	19	0	14	0	4	0	—		—		37	0
Coritiba	2023	Série A	0	0	1	0	0	0	—		—		1	0
Coritiba	Total		21	0	15	0	4	0	—		—		40	0
Mirassol	2023	Série B	38	0	8	0	—		—		—		46	0
Mirassol	2024	Série B	0	0	0	0	—		—		—		0	0
Mirassol	Total		38	0	8	0	—		—		—		46	0
Career total			202	0	184	0	24	0	11	0	39	0	460	0

== Honours ==
Serrano-PR

- Campeonato Paranaense Série Bronze: 2008

Flamengo

- Campeonato Carioca: 2017

Coritiba

- Campeonato Paranaense: 2022

=== Individual ===
- Best Goalkeeper in Brazil: 2016
