= Willian Arão =

Brazilian footballer (born 1992)

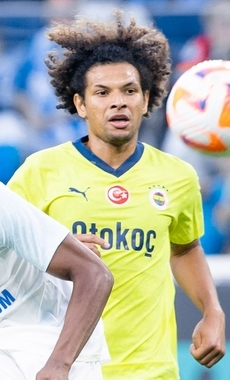
- Willian Arão with Fenerbahçe in 2023

Personal information
- Full name: Willian Souza Arão da Silva
- Date of birth: 12 March 1992 (age 34)
- Place of birth: São Paulo, Brazil
- Height: 1.81 m (5 ft 11 in)
- Position: Defensive midfielder

Team information
- Current team: Santos
- Number: 15

Youth career
- 2007: Grêmio Barueri
- 2008–2010: São Paulo
- 2010: Espanyol
- 2011–2012: Corinthians

Senior career*
Years	Team	Apps	(Gls)
2012–2015	Corinthians	17	(0)
2013	→ Portuguesa (loan)	13	(0)
2014	→ Chapecoense (loan)	15	(1)
2014	→ Atlético Goianiense (loan)	13	(0)
2015	→ Botafogo (loan)	54	(6)
2016–2022	Flamengo	277	(24)
2022–2023	Fenerbahçe	31	(0)
2023–2025	Panathinaikos	56	(4)
2025–	Santos	45	(1)

International career^{‡}
2017	Brazil	1	(0)
- * Club domestic league appearances and goals as of 17:27, 19 November 2026 (UTC) ‡ National team caps and goals as of 25 January 2017

Willian Souza Arão da Silva (born 12 March 1992) is a Brazilian professional footballer who plays for Santos. Mainly a defensive midfielder, he can also play as a centre-back.

Arão started his youth career playing for São Paulo and Corinthians, where he had his first professional experience, although Arão spend most of his following years playing on loan for different Brazilian clubs, including a very consistent 2015 season with Botafogo winning the 2015 Campeonato Brasileiro Série B.

In 2016 Arão was involved in a very complicated transfer to Flamengo with Botafogo complaining about the way their rivals approached the player. The situation is still to be solved in the Brazilian justice court.

== Club career ==
=== Early career ===
Born in São Paulo, Arão began his career in the youth sides of Grêmio Barueri at the age of 15. He left for São Paulo FC in 2008, and became a part of the squad which won the 2010 Copa São Paulo de Futebol Júnior.

Shortly after winning the Copinha, Arão was spotted by agent Mino Raiola, who brought him to Spanish side Espanyol. He spent eight months at the club, and despite training with the main squad and with the B-team, he was unable to play due to bureaucratic problems.

=== Corinthians ===
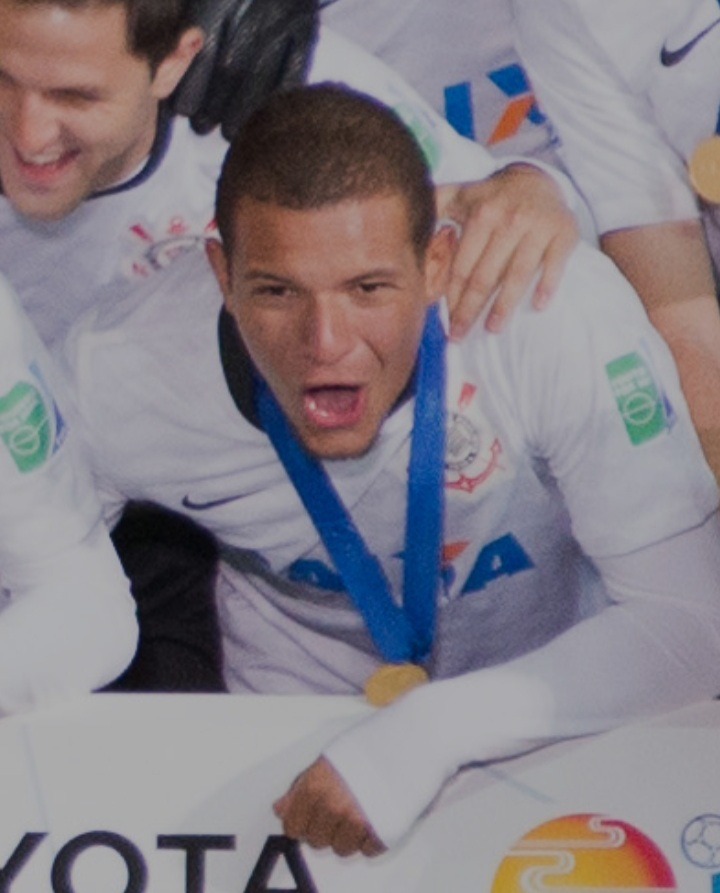
Arão celebrating the 2012 FIFA Club World Cup title with Corinthians

In November 2011, Arão moved to Corinthians. After appearing with the main squad in a friendly against Flamengo, he made his professional debut on 15 April 2012, starting in a 2–1 Campeonato Paulista away win over Ponte Preta.

A backup to Ralf and Paulinho, Arão was a part of both 2012 Copa Libertadores and 2012 FIFA Club World Cup squads, despite not featuring in both competitions; in the former, he replaced Adriano in the list for the quarterfinals, and in the latter, he was registered after Guilherme Andrade was signed after the allowed date by FIFA.

==== Portuguesa (loan) ====
On 6 August 2013, after being demoted to fourth-choice, Arão was loaned to fellow top tier side Portuguesa until the end of the year. At the club he played a total of fifteen matches, including his first two continental appearances at 2013 Copa Sudamericana.

==== Chapecoense (loan) ====
On 9 January 2014, Arão signed with Chapecoense a one-year loan deal. Regularly used in the year's Campeonato Catarinense, he scored his first professional goal on 12 February, netting his side's second in a 3–2 home win over Atlético Hermann Aichinger.

On 27 June 2014, after just two Série A matches, Arão's loan was cut short.

==== Atlético Goianiense (loan) ====
On 18 September 2014, after failing to make an appearance back at Corinthians, Arão was loaned to Série B side Atlético Goianiense until the end of the year. He played a total of thirteen 2014 Campeonato Brasileiro Série B matches, twelve of those as starter.

=== Botafogo ===
On 10 January 2015, Arão joined Botafogo on loan until the end of 2015 season. A regular starter, he scored seven goals in 58 appearances overall for the club; one of those goals was the winner in a 2–1 away success over ABC which sealed Botafogo's 2015 Campeonato Brasileiro Série B title.

==== Renewal attempts and transfer issues ====
On 27 November 2015, after media outlet GloboEsporte.com reported that Arão had a deal with Flamengo, Botafogo exercised the R$ 400,000 buyout clause on his loan deal, and activated a permanent two-year contract. Hours later, Arão sent back the sum to Botafogo, and the club tried to pay the sum three days later, which was also returned; Botafogo later went to Court to secure the player's rights.

As Arão owned 50% of his economic rights (thus being a "third-party ownership"), himself and his representatives considered the new regulation from FIFA (which took effect on 1 May 2015) banning third-party ownership and considering the contracts signed between January and April 2015 of a maximum of one year. Despite Botafogo considering the contract was valid due to its register in the CBF and in the FERJ, and having the first instance on their favour, Arão was declared a free agent on 10 December 2015.

=== Flamengo ===
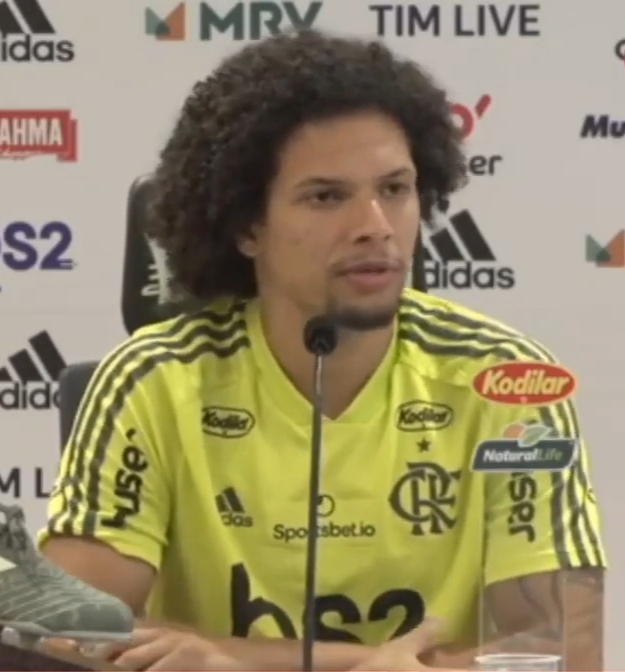
Arão during an interview as a Flamengo player in 2019

On 14 December 2015, Flamengo announced the signing of Arão on a three-year contract. He instantly earned a first team spot being selected to the 2016 Bola de Prata.

On 28 December 2016, Arão signed another three-year contract with Flamengo until December 2019. In 2018, he lost space in the first team and was linked to a move to Internacional and Olympiacos, which never materialized. Flamengo and the Greek side agreed to a €2.5 million fee, but the transfer was canceled a few days later after Arão failed to agree terms of his wages.

On 24 December 2018, after regaining his starting spot, Arão further extended his link with Fla until 2021. In the following campaign, he was moved to a more defensive midfield position by new head coach Jorge Jesus, becoming an important unit of the club's Carioca, Série A and Copa Libertadores wins.

With head coach Rogério Ceni, during the 2020 season, Arão started to also feature as centre-back.

=== Fenerbahçe ===
On 14 July 2022, Arão moved abroad for the first time in his career, signing a two-year contract with an option for an additional year with Turkish club Fenerbahçe. Reunited with former Flamengo head coach Jesus, he was a regular starter during his only season at the club.

=== Panathinaikos ===
On 17 August 2023, after Jesus' departure from Fenerbachçe, Arão also left the club to join Greek side Panathinaikos on a two-year contract. On 20 May 2025, after two seasons as a starter, the club announced his departure.

=== Santos ===
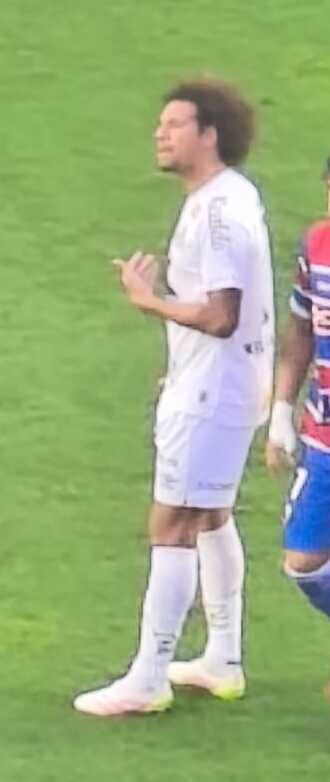
Arão playing for Santos in 2025

On 1 July 2025, Santos announced the signing of Arão until December 2026. He made his club debut fifteen days later, replacing Guilherme late into a 1–0 home win over former side Flamengo.

Arão scored his first goal for Peixe on 13 August 2026, netting the winner in a 2–1 home success over Macará.

== International career ==
On 19 January 2017 Arão was called up to the Brazil national team for the first time to play a friendly match against Colombia. He made his full international debut six days later, starting in the 1–0 win at the Nilton Santos.

== Career statistics ==
=== Club ===
As of 19 November 2026

Club	Season	League			State League (Note: Includes Campeonato Paulista, Campeonato Catarinense, Campeonato Carioca)		Cup (Note: Includes Copa do Brasil and Turkish Cup)		Continental		Other		Total	
Club	Season	Division	Apps	Goals	Apps	Goals	Apps	Goals	Apps	Goals	Apps	Goals	Apps	Goals
Corinthians	2011	Série A	0	0	0	0	0	0	0	0	—		0	0
Corinthians	2012	Série A	8	0	1	0	0	0	0	0	0	0	9	0
Corinthians	2013	Série A	2	0	6	0	0	0	0	0	—		8	0
Corinthians	Total		10	0	7	0	0	0	0	0	0	0	17	0
Portuguesa (loan)	2013	Série A	13	0	—		—		2 (Note: Appearance(s) in Copa Sudamericana)	0	—		15	0
Chapecoense (loan)	2014	Série A	2	0	13	1	1	0	—		—		16	1
Atlético Goianiense (loan)	2014	Série B	13	0	—		—		—		—		13	0
Botafogo (loan)	2015	Série B	35	5	19	1	4	1	—		—		58	7
Flamengo	2016	Série A	37	4	15	3	4	0	2	0	4 (Note: Appearances(s) in Primeira Liga)	0	62	7
Flamengo	2017	Série A	30	1	14	4	6	0	16 (Note: Six appearances and one goal in Copa Libertadores, ten appearances and three goals in Copa Sudamericana)	4	1	4	67	9
Flamengo	2018	Série A	23	2	3	0	3	0	3 (Note: Appearance(s) in Copa Libertadores)	0	—		32	2
Flamengo	2019	Série A	35	2	12	2	3	1	12	0	2 (Note: Appearance(s) in FIFA Club World Cup)	0	64	5
Flamengo	2020	Série A	32	1	13	0	4	0	5	1	3 (Note: Two appearances in Recopa Sudamericana, one appearance in Supercopa do Brasil)	0	57	2
Flamengo	2021	Série A	30	1	7	0	6	0	11	3	1 (Note: Appearance(s) in Supercopa do Brasil)	0	55	4
Flamengo	2022	Série A	14	2	12	2	1	0	6	1	1	0	34	5
Flamengo	Total		201	13	76	11	27	1	55	9	12	4	371	38
Fenerbahçe	2022–23	Süper Lig	31	0	—		6	0	8 (Note: Two appearances in UEFA Champions League, six appearances and one goal in UEFA Europa League)	1	—		45	1
Panathinaikos	2023–24	Super League Greece	32	3	—		6	0	7 (Note: One appearance in UEFA Champions League, three appearances in UEFA Europa League)	0	—		45	3
Panathinaikos	2024–25	Super League Greece	24	1	—		1	0	14 (Note: Four appearances in UEFA Europa League, ten appearances in UEFA Conference League)	0	—		39	1
Panathinaikos	Total		56	4	0	0	7	0	21	0	0	0	84	4
Santos	2025	Série A	13	0	—		—		—		—		13	0
Santos	2026	Série A	25	1	7	0	5	0	10	2	—		47	3
Santos	Total		38	1	7	0	5	0	10	2	—		60	3
Career total			399	23	122	13	50	2	96	12	12	0	679	50

=== International ===
As of 25 January 2017.

Team	Season	Apps	Goals
Brazil	2017	1	0
Total		1	0

== Honours ==
=== Club ===
Corinthians

- FIFA Club World Cup: 2012
- Copa Libertadores: 2012
- Recopa Sudamericana: 2013
- Campeonato Paulista: 2013

Botafogo

- Campeonato Brasileiro Série B: 2015

Flamengo

- Copa Libertadores: 2019, 2022
- Campeonato Brasileiro Série A: 2019, 2020
- Supercopa do Brasil: 2020, 2021
- Recopa Sudamericana: 2020
- Campeonato Carioca: 2017, 2019, 2020, 2021

Fenerbahçe

- Turkish Cup: 2022–23

Panathinaikos

- Greek Cup: 2023–24

=== Individual ===
- Campeonato Carioca Team of the Year: 2016
- Bola de Prata: 2016, 2019
- Best Defensive Midfielder in Brazil: 2016, 2019, 2021
- Copa Libertadores Team of the Tournament: 2021
- South American Team of the Year: 2021
