= Felipe Vizeu =

Brazilian footballer (born 1997)

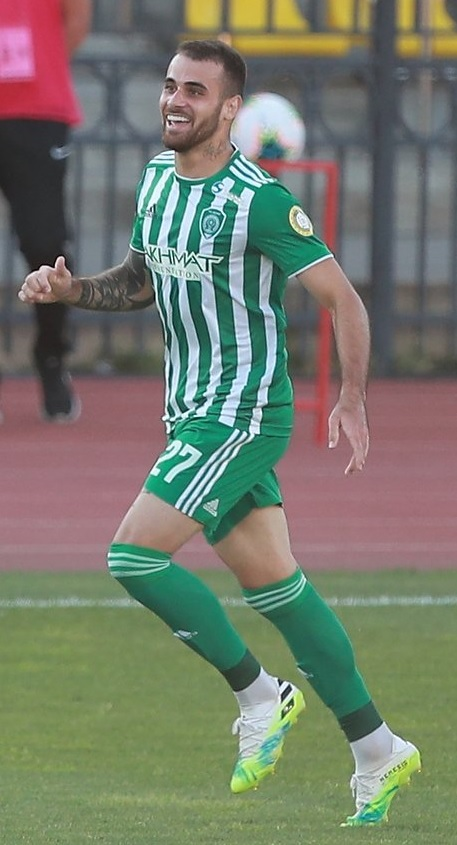
- Vizeu with Akhmat Grozny in 2020

Personal information
- Full name: Felipe dos Reis Pereira Vizeu do Carmo
- Date of birth: 12 March 1997 (age 29)
- Place of birth: Três Rios, Brazil
- Height: 1.84 m (6 ft 0 in)
- Position: Striker

Team information
- Current team: Avaí
- Number: 11

Youth career
- 2011–2012: América Mineiro
- 2013–2016: Flamengo

Senior career*
Years	Team	Apps	(Gls)
2016–2018	Flamengo	59	(15)
2018–2022	Udinese	5	(0)
2019	→ Grêmio (loan)	21	(3)
2020	→ Akhmat Grozny (loan)	7	(1)
2020–2021	→ Ceará (loan)	13	(2)
2021–2022	→ Yokohama FC (loan)	21	(3)
2022	Sheriff Tiraspol	6	(2)
2023	Atlético Goianiense	9	(2)
2023–2024	Criciúma	44	(8)
2025	Remo	13	(1)
2025–2026	Sporting Cristal	20	(7)
2026–	Avaí	9	(0)

International career^{‡}
2016–2017	Brazil U20	10	(4)
- * Club domestic league appearances and goals as of 18 November 2026 ‡ National team caps and goals as of 5 June 2018

Felipe dos Reis Pereira Vizeu do Carmo (born 12 March 1997), known as just Felipe Vizeu, is a Brazilian professional footballer who plays as a striker for Avaí.

He has been a member of Brazil U20 team with 10 appearances.

== Career ==
Felipe started his youth career at América (MG) in 2011, but after standing out moved to Flamengo in 2013.

=== Flamengo ===
==== Early career ====
At Flamengo Felipe had a successful youth career, peaking with the title of the 2016 Copa São Paulo de Futebol Júnior, the most important youth tournament in Brazil. Felipe became one of the most important players in the championship campaign being selected as the highlight player of the tournament.

==== 2016 season ====
Vizeu debuted in the professional team on 10 February 2016 in the 2016 Rio de Janeiro State League 5–0 win against Portuguesa (RJ). Few days later on 24 February he scored his first goal for Flamengo in a 1–0 win over Cabofriense also for the 2016 Rio State League.

In March 2016 Felipe has been promoted to the professional squad due to the transfer of Kayke to Yokohama F. Marinos leaving the club with only Paolo Guerrero to play as striker.

Felipe played his first Série A match and also scored his first goal in a 2–2 draw against Chapecoense on 25 May 2016 at Estádio Raulino de Oliveira. He finished his first season with 15 Série A appearances and 5 goals.

==== 2017 season ====
Vizeu scored his first goal in a continental competition on 9 August 2017 in the 5–0 win against Palestino for the second round of the 2017 Copa Sudamericana. He scored again in the quarterfinals second leg 3–3 draw against Fluminense. In the semifinals Vizeu hit the net again, this time in both legs against Junior, once in the first leg at Estádio do Maracanã and twice in the second leg at Estadio Metropolitano Roberto Meléndez.

=== Udinese ===
On 7 February 2018 Udinese signed with Vizeu a five-year contract paying a US$6m transfer fee, although Vizeu will only move to the Italian club on 1 July 2018.

==== Grêmio (loan) ====
On 12 January 2019, Vizeu joined Grêmio on loan until 31 January 2020.

==== Athletico Paranaense (loan) ====
On 4 January 2020, Udinese announced that Vizeu would be loaned to Athletico Paranaense until 31 December 2020, but the deal was cancelled a few days later.

==== Akhmat Grozny (loan) ====
On 16 January 2020, Russian club Akhmat Grozny announced that they signed a contract with Vizeu, who joined them on loan until 31 December 2020 with an option to make the transfer permanent at the end of it. On 7 July 2020, he scored his first goal for Akhmat to give his team a 2–1 away victory over FC Tambov. His loan was terminated on 17 September 2020.

==== Ceará (loan) ====
On 18 October 2020, Vizeu joined Ceará on loan, until 30 June 2021.

=== Sheriff Tiraspol ===
On 30 August 2022, Vizeu signed with Sheriff Tiraspol in Moldova.

== International career ==
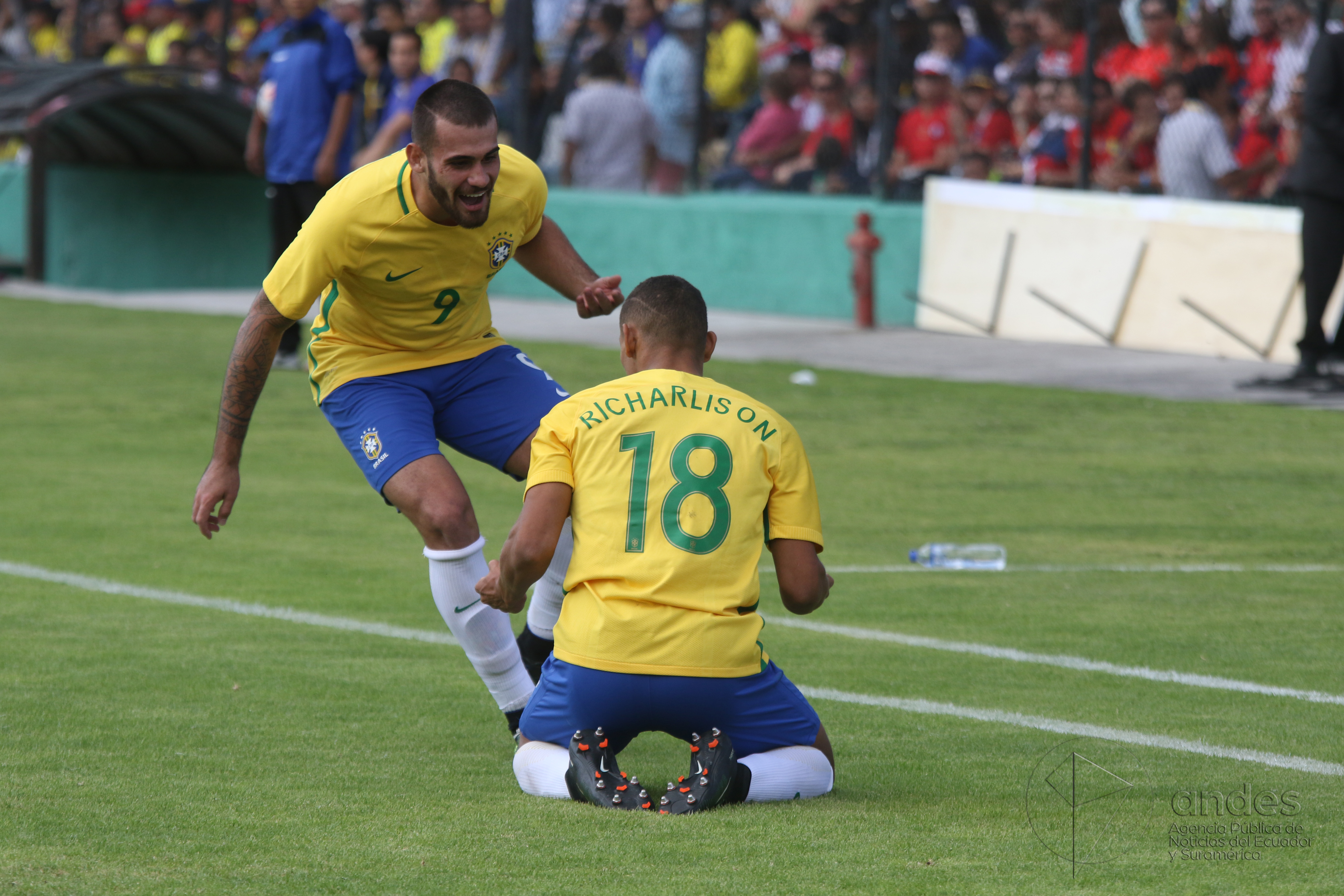
Vizeu and Richarlison celebrating a goal against Paraguay U20 in the 2017 South American Youth Football Championship.

On 18 July 2016 Brazil U23 head coach Rogério Micale announced that Vizeu had been chosen as one of the alternate players for the 2016 Summer Olympics. Vizeu received his first call-up to play for Brazil U20 on 16 August 2016.

== Career statistics ==
=== Club ===
As of 1 July 2022

Appearances and goals by club, season and competition
Club	Season	League			State League		Cup		Continental		Other		Total	
Club	Season	Division	Apps	Goals	Apps	Goals	Apps	Goals	Apps	Goals	Apps	Goals	Apps	Goals
Flamengo	2016	Série A	15	5	7	3	1	0	1 (Note: Appearance(s) in Copa Sudamericana)	0	2 (Note: Appearance(s) in Primeira Liga)	0	26	8
Flamengo	2017	Série A	18	2	8	2	2	0	8	5	2	0	38	9
Flamengo	2018	Série A	5	3	6	0	0	0	0	0	—		11	3
Flamengo	Total		38	10	21	5	3	0	9	5	4	0	75	20
Udinese	2018–19	Serie A	5	0	—		0	0	—		—		5	0
Grêmio (loan)	2019	Série A	11	1	10	2	3	2	2 (Note: Appearance(s) in Copa Libertadores)	0	—		26	5
Akhmat Grozny (loan)	2019–20	Russian Premier League	7	1	—		0	0	—		—		7	1
Ceará (loan)	2020	Série A	11	2	—		3	0	—		0	0	14	2
Ceará (loan)	2021	Série A	1	0	1	0	1	0	4	0	11 (Note: Appearance(s) in Copa do Nordeste)	3	18	3
Ceará (loan)	Total		12	2	1	0	4	0	4	0	11	3	32	5
Yokohama FC (loan)	2021	J1 League	13	2	—		—		—		—		13	2
Yokohama FC (loan)	2022	J2 League	8	1	—		2	1	—		—		10	2
Yokohama FC (loan)	Total		21	3	0	0	2	1	0	0	0	0	23	4
Career total			94	17	32	7	11	3	11	5	15	3	162	35

== Honours ==
Flamengo

- Campeonato Carioca: 2017

Grêmio

- Campeonato Gaúcho: 2019

Ceará

- Copa do Nordeste: 2020

Criciúma

- Recopa Catarinense: 2024

Remo

- Campeonato Paraense: 2025

Individual

- Copa Sudamericana topscorer: 2017
