= Rafael Vaz =

Brazilian footballer

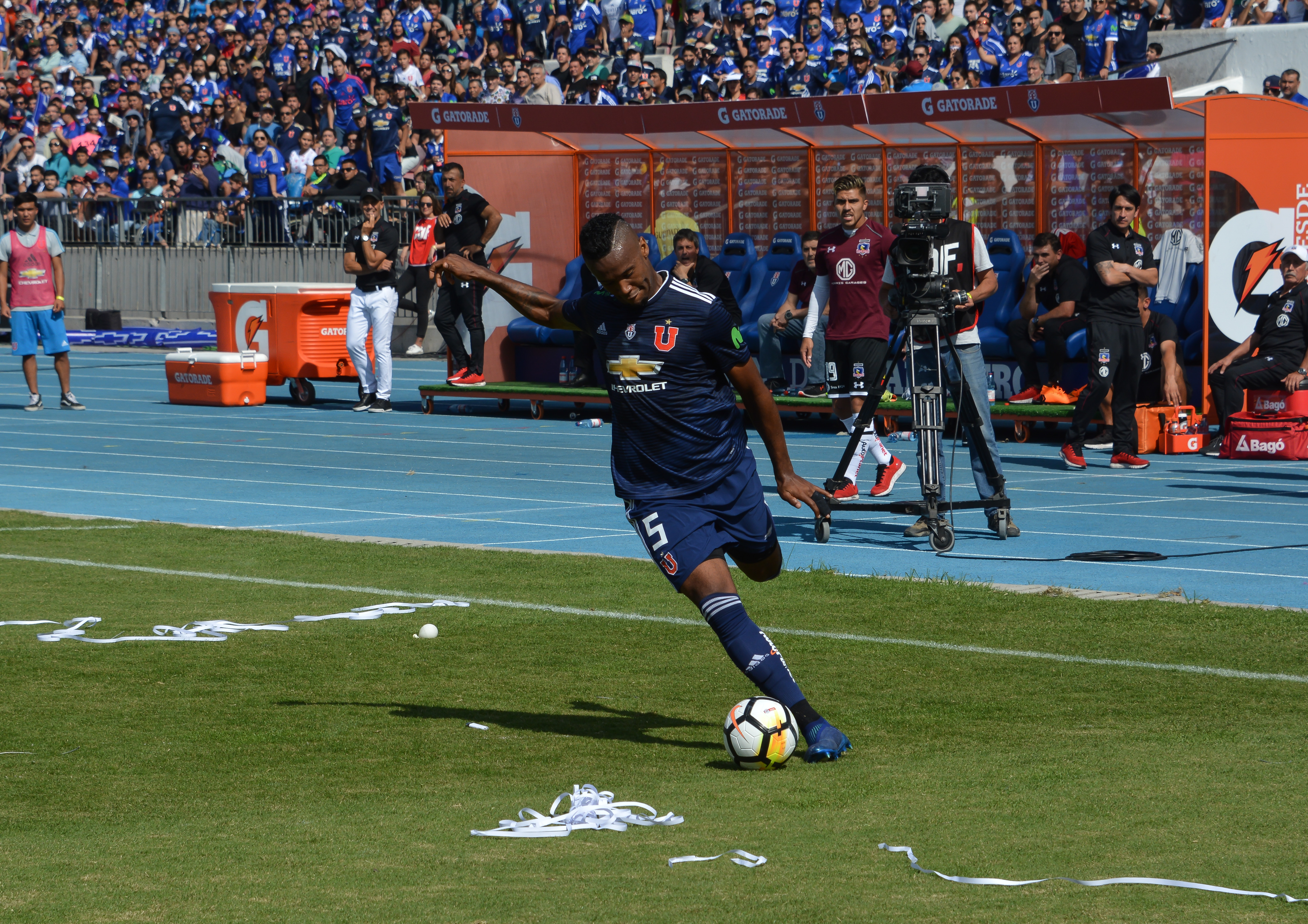
- Vaz playing for Universidad de Chile in 2018

Personal information
- Full name: Rafael Vaz dos Santos
- Date of birth: 17 September 1988 (age 38)
- Place of birth: Caieiras, Brazil
- Height: 1.88 m (6 ft 2 in)
- Position: Centre back

Team information
- Current team: Náutico

Youth career
- 1998–2001: Corinthians
- 2002: Paulista
- 2003: Grêmio Barueri
- 2004–2006: Palmeiras

Senior career*
Years	Team	Apps	(Gls)
2006–2008	Palmeiras	0	(0)
2007	→ Gama (loan)	0	(0)
2008	→ Oeste (loan)	0	(0)
2008	Bahia	0	(0)
2009	Iguaçu	0	(0)
2009–2010	CRAC	0	(0)
2010	Votuporanguense	0	(0)
2011	Paraná	0	(0)
2012	Vila Nova	18	(6)
2013	Ceará	2	(0)
2013–2016	Vasco da Gama	29	(4)
2016–2018	Flamengo	49	(1)
2018	→ Universidad de Chile (loan)	19	(3)
2019–2020	Goiás	39	(6)
2020–2022	Al-Khor	30	(4)
2022	Avaí	18	(0)
2023	São Bernardo	24	(2)
2023	→ Londrina (loan)	17	(0)
2024–	Náutico	0	(0)
- * Club domestic league appearances and goals as of 23 December 2023

Rafael Vaz dos Santos (born 17 September 1988) is a Brazilian footballer who plays as a centre back for Náutico.

== Career ==
=== Flamengo ===
On 8 June 2016 Flamengo signed Rafael after his contract with Vasco da Gama expired.

==== Universidad de Chile (loan) ====
On 25 January 2018 Flamengo loaned Vaz to Universidad de Chile until the end of 2018.

== Career statistics ==
(Correct As of 9 September 2020.)

Club	Season	League			Cup		Continental		Other		Total	
Club	Season	Division	Apps	Goals	Apps	Goals	Apps	Goals	Apps	Goals	Apps	Goals
Paraná Clube	2011	Série C	0	0	2	0	-	-	13	2	15	2
Vila Nova	2012	Série C	18	6	4	1	-	-	0	0	22	7
Ceará	2013	Série B	2	0	4	1	-	-	24	3	30	4
Vasco da Gama	2013	Série A	14	3	-	-	-	-	-	-	14	3
Vasco da Gama	2014	Série B	5	0	2	0	-	-	5	2	12	2
Vasco da Gama	2015	Série A	9	1	1	0	-	-	-	-	10	1
Vasco da Gama	2016	Série B	1	0	3	2	-	-	7	2	11	4
Vasco da Gama	Total		29	4	6	2	0	0	12	4	47	10
Flamengo	2016	Série A	29	0	-	-	3	0	-	-	32	0
Flamengo	2017	Série A	20	1	4	0	7	1	15	0	47	2
Flamengo	Total		49	1	4	0	10	1	15	0	79	2
U. de Chile (loan)	2018	Primera División	19	3	7	0	3	0	-	-	29	3
Goiás	2019	Série A	32	5	2	0	-	-	14	2	48	3
Goiás	2020	Série A	7	1	3	2	-	-	2	0	12	3
Goiás	Total		39	6	5	2	0	0	16	2	60	6
Career total			156	20	32	6	13	1	80	11	278	37

== Honours ==
Ceará

- Campeonato Cearense: 2013

Vasco da Gama

- Campeonato Carioca: 2015, 2016

Flamengo

- Campeonato Carioca: 2017
