= Terra Alta, Pará =

Coordinates: 1°02′16″S 47°54′28″W

- Municipality
- Coat of arms

- Location in Pará
- Country: Brazil
- Region: Northern
- State: Pará
- Mesoregion: Nordeste Paraense
- Established: 1991

Area
  - Total: 79.696 sq mi (206.412 km^{2})

Population (2020)
  - Total: 11,847
- Time zone: UTC−3 (BRT)

Terra Alta, Pará is a municipality in the state of Pará in the Northern region of Brazil. As of 2020, the municipality had a population of 11,847.

== See also ==
- List of municipalities in Pará
