= Loran (footballer) =

Brazilian footballer (born 1998)

Personal information
- Full name: Loran Romualdo dos Santos da Silva
- Date of birth: 20 July 1998 (age 28)
- Place of birth: Rio de Janeiro, Brazil
- Height: 1.83 m (6 ft 0 in)
- Position: Forward

Team information
- Current team: Retrô

Youth career
- –2013: Bangu
- 2014–2017: Fluminense
- 2018: Flamengo
- 2017: Botafogo
- 2019: Anapolina

Senior career*
Years	Team	Apps	(Gls)
2019	Duque de Caxias	18	(1)
2019	Bagé	0	(0)
2020–	Retrô	1	(0)
- * Club domestic league appearances and goals as of 16:14, 6 August 2020 (UTC)

Loran Romualdo dos Santos da Silva (born 20 July 1998), commonly known as Loran, is a Brazilian footballer who currently plays as a forward for Retrô.

== Career statistics ==
=== Club ===
As of 6 August 2020.

Club	Season	League			State League		Cup		Continental		Other		Total	
Club	Season	Division	Apps	Goals	Apps	Goals	Apps	Goals	Apps	Goals	Apps	Goals	Apps	Goals
Duque de Caxias	2019	–			18 (Note: Appearances in the Campeonato Carioca Série B1)	1	0	0	0	0	0	0	18	1
Bagé	2019	–			0	0	0	0	0	0	2 (Note: Appearances in the Copa FGF)	0	2	0
Retrô	2020	–			1 (Note: Appearances in the Campeonato Pernambucano)	0	0	0	0	0	0	0	1	0
Career total			0	0	19	1	0	0	0	0	2	0	21	1
