= Joaquín Romo =

Chilean footballer (born 1999)

Personal information
- Full name: Joaquín Alejandro Romo López
- Date of birth: 19 November 1999 (age 26)
- Place of birth: Puente Alto, Santiago, Chile
- Height: 1.68 m (5 ft 6 in)
- Position: Midfielder

Team information
- Current team: Curicó Unido
- Number: 8

Youth career
- Palestino

Senior career*
Years	Team	Apps	(Gls)
2017–2021	Palestino	6	(0)
2019	→ Sparti (loan)	10	(0)
2019	→ Fernández Vial (loan)	10	(1)
2020–2021	→ Deportes Recoleta (loan)	9	(0)
2021	→ Deportes Colina (loan)	14	(0)
2022–2023	Provincial Osorno	23	(3)
2024	Barnechea	19	(1)
2025	Universidad de Concepción	22	(0)
2026–	Curicó Unido	0	(0)
- * Club domestic league appearances and goals as of 7 December 2025

Joaquín Alejandro Romo López (born 19 November 1999) is a Chilean footballer who plays for Curicó Unido.

== Career ==
In 2019, Romo had a stint with Greek club Sparti on loan from Palestino.

In 2025, Romo signed with Universidad de Concepción and won the 2025 Liga de Ascenso. He switched to Curicó Unido for the next season.

== Honours ==
Universidad de Concepción

- Primera B de Chile: 2025
