= Jajá (footballer, born 1995) =

Brazilian footballer

Personal information
- Full name: Hugo Gomes dos Santos Silva
- Date of birth: 18 March 1995 (age 31)
- Place of birth: Rio de Janeiro, Brazil
- Height: 1.78 m (5 ft 10 in)
- Position: Midfielder

Team information
- Current team: Madura United
- Number: 23

Youth career
- 2006: Tigres do Brasil
- 2006–2015: Flamengo

Senior career*
Years	Team	Apps	(Gls)
2015–2018	Flamengo	9	(0)
2016	→ Avaí (loan)	19	(1)
2017	→ Tombense (loan)	1	(0)
2017	→ Vila Nova (loan)	5	(0)
2018	→ Kalmar FF (loan)	3	(0)
2020	Kalmar FF	0	(0)
2021–2024	Madura United	96	(25)
2024–2026	Dewa United	49	(1)
2026–	Madura United	1	(0)

International career
2015–2016	Brazil U20	6	(0)
Medal record
Men's football
Representing Brazil
FIFA U-20 World Cup
Runner-up	2015 New Zealand	Team
- * Club domestic league appearances and goals as of 6 September 2026

Hugo Gomes dos Santos Silva (born 18 March 1995), commonly known as Jajá, is a Brazilian professional footballer who plays as a midfielder for Super League club Madura United.

== Club career ==
=== Early career ===
Born in Rio de Janeiro, Jajá started his football career with Tigres do Brasil and stayed there until 2006 when he transferred to Flamengo youth team, playing at youth level until 2015.

=== Flamengo ===
On 1 January 2015, Jajá signed his first professional contract with Flamengo. He made his league debut on 11 September 2015 against Cruzeiro at Maracanã Stadium, the Flamengo's home ground which Flamengo won by 2–0. In this match, he was substituted for Paulinho at 90+2'.

==== Avaí (Loan) ====
On 9 May 2016, Avaí announced that Jajá came Avaí on loan. On 28 May 2016, he scored his first goal against Ceará. Avaí won the match by 4–2. He has played 19 games in Série B for Avaí and scored one goal.

==== Kalmar FF (Loan) ====
In July 2018 Jajá signed with Kalmar FF, on loan, until the end of 2018 season. His contract with Flamengo was not renewed and he was released at the end of the season.

=== Madura United ===
On 15 March 2021, Madura United signed Jajá from Kalmar FF on a one-year contract. He made his league debut on 3 September by starting in a 1–1 draw against Persikabo 1973, he also scored his first goal for Madura United in the 40th minute.

== International career ==
Jajá has represented the member of Brazil national under-20 football team since 2015. In 2015, he was first chosen national team. He played in 2015 FIFA U-20 World Cup. He contributed that Brazil finished the competition as a runners-up, playing 6 games.

== Club career statistics ==
(Correct As of 6 September 2026)

Club	Season	League			Cup		Continental		Other		Total	
Club	Season	Division	Apps	Goals	Apps	Goals	Apps	Goals	Apps	Goals	Apps	Goals
Flamengo	2015	Série A	5	0	1	0	—		1	0	7	0
Flamengo	2016	Série A	0	0	0	0	—		1	0	1	0
Flamengo	2018	Série A	0	0	0	0	—		2	0	2	0
Flamengo	Total		5	0	1	0	0	0	4	0	10	0
Avaí (loan)	2016	Série B	19	1	1	0	—		0	0	20	1
Tombense (loan)	2017	Série C	0	0	0	0	—		1	0	1	0
Vila Nova (loan)	2017	Série B	5	0	0	0	—		—		1	0
Kalmar (loan)
Kalmar (loan)	2018	Allsvenskan	3	0	1	0	–		–		4	0
Kalmar (loan)	2020	Allsvenskan	0	0	0	0	–		–		0	0
Kalmar (loan)	Total		3	0	1	0	0	0	0	0	4	0
Madura United	2021–22	Liga 1	31	10	0	0	–		4	0	35	10
Madura United	2022–23	Liga 1	32	6	0	0	–		0	0	32	6
Madura United	2023–24	Liga 1	33	9	0	0	–		0	0	33	9
Madura United	Total		96	25	0	0	0	0	4	0	100	25
Dewa United	2024–25	Liga 1	27	0	0	0	–		0	0	27	0
Dewa United	2025–26	Super League	22	1	0	0	5 (Note: Appearances in AFC Challenge League)	1	0	0	25	2
Dewa United	Total		49	1	0	0	5	0	0	0	54	2
Madura United	2026–27	Super League	1	0	0	0	–		0	0	1	0
Career total			178	27	3	0	3	1	9	0	193	28

^{1}Other tournaments include Campeonato Carioca: 2015, 2016 ^{2}Other tournaments include Menpora Cup: 2021 ^{3}Other tournaments include AFC Challenge League: 2025–26

== Honours ==
=== International ===
Brazil U20

- FIFA U-20 World Cup runner-up: 2015

Individual

- Liga 1 Team of the Season : 2023–24
