= 2017 Campeonato Carioca =

Campeonato Carioca
- Season: 2017
- Dates: 11 January – 4 May 2017
- Champions: Flamengo
- Relegated: Campos; Tigres do Brasil
- Copa do Brasil: Botafogo; Fluminense; Madureira; Nova Iguaçu
- Série D: Madureira; Nova Iguaçu

The 2017 Campeonato Carioca was the 114th edition of the top tier of the Campeonato Carioca, organized by FFERJ (Federação de Futebol do Estado do Rio de Janeiro, or Rio de Janeiro State Football Federation). The top four teams not otherwise qualified through national and international tournaments qualified for the 2018 Copa do Brasil. The top two teams not already playing in the Campeonato Brasileiro Série A, Série B or Série C qualified for the 2018 Campeonato Brasileiro Série D.

Unlike previous editions of the Campeonato Carioca, there was a preliminary stage played by the bottom four teams from the previous edition and the top two teams from the 2016 Campeonato Carioca Série B. The top two teams from the preliminary stage qualified for the main competition, while the remaining four teams competed in a relegation playoff round. The bottom two teams in the relegation playoff round were relegated to the 2017 Campeonato Carioca Série B1. The main competition consisted of two phases, the Taça Guanabara and the Taça Rio. In the Taça Guanabara, the teams were divided into two groups of six, with each team playing against every other team in their own group once; the top two teams from each group qualified to a single-legged knockout round. In the Taça Rio, the same groups of six had each team play every team from the other group once; the top two teams from each group qualified to a single-legged knockout round. The top four teams in the overall standings, including both the Taça Guanabara and the Taça Rio, then qualified for a final stage to determine the champion of the Campeonato Carioca; this consisted of a single-legged semifinal and a two-legged final.

== Participating teams ==
Location of teams in the 2017 Campeonato Carioca
Location of teams in the 2017 Campeonato Carioca – city of Rio de Janeiro

Club	Home city	Manager	2016 result
Bangu Atlético Clube	Rio de Janeiro (Bangu)	Eduardo Allax, Arturzinho and Roberto Fernandes	7th
Boavista Sport Club	Saquarema	Joel Santana	6th
Bonsucesso Futebol Clube	Rio de Janeiro (Olaria) (Note: Although Bonsucesso FC is headquartered in Bonsucesso, it played home games at Rua Bariri Stadium)	Heron Ferreira and Duílio	14th
Botafogo de Futebol e Regatas	Rio de Janeiro (Engenho de Dentro) (Note: Although Botafogo FR is headquartered in Botafogo, it plays home games at Engenhão Stadium)	Jair Ventura	2nd
Associação Desportiva Cabofriense	Cabo Frio	Júnior Lopes and Antônio Carlos Roy	13th
Campos Atlético Associação	Cardoso Moreira (Note: Although Campos AA is headquartered in Campos dos Goytacazes, it played home games at Antônio Ferreira de Medeiros Stadium)	Rafael Soriano	2nd (Série B)
Clube de Regatas do Flamengo	Rio de Janeiro (Maracanã) (Note: Although CR Flamengo is headquartered in Lagoa, it plays home games at Maracanã Stadium)	Zé Ricardo	4th
Fluminense Football Club	Rio de Janeiro (Maracanã) (Note: Although Fluminense FC is headquartered in Laranjeiras, it plays home games at Maracanã Stadium)	Abel Braga	3rd
Macaé Esporte Futebol Clube	Macaé	René Simões and Toninho Andrade	10th
Madureira Esporte Clube	Rio de Janeiro (Madureira)	PC Gusmão	7th
Nova Iguaçu Futebol Clube	Nova Iguaçu	Edson Souza	1st (Série B)
Associação Atlética Portuguesa	Rio de Janeiro (Governador)	Nelson Rodrigues da Cunha and João Carlos Ângelo	12th
Resende Futebol Clube	Resende	Ademir Fonseca	9th
Esporte Clube Tigres do Brasil	Duque de Caxias	Felipe and Manoel Neto	11th
Club de Regatas Vasco da Gama	Rio de Janeiro (Vasco da Gama)	Cristóvão Borges, Valdir Bigode and Milton Mendes	1st
Volta Redonda Futebol Clube	Volta Redonda	Cairo Lima and Felipe Surian	5th

== First round (Group A) ==
Pos	Team	Pld	W	D	L	GF	GA	GD	Pts	Qualification
1	Portuguesa (Q)	5	3	1	1	5	5	0	10	Championship round
2	Nova Iguaçu (Q)	5	2	2	1	11	7	+4	8	Championship round
3	Cabofriense	5	2	2	1	10	7	+3	8	Relegation playoffs
4	Campos	5	1	3	1	6	6	0	6	Relegation playoffs
5	Tigres do Brasil	5	1	2	2	7	8	−1	5	Relegation playoffs
6	Bonsucesso	5	0	2	3	4	10	−6	2	Relegation playoffs

Rules for classification: 1) points; 2) goal difference; 3) number of goals scored.
(Q) Qualified for the phase indicated

== Championship round ==
=== Taça Guanabara ===
==== Group stage ====
===== Group B =====
Pos	Team	Pld	W	D	L	GF	GA	GD	Pts	Qualification
1	Flamengo (Q)	5	5	0	0	17	2	+15	15	Qualified for Semifinals
2	Madureira (Q)	5	3	1	1	5	5	0	10	Qualified for Semifinals
3	Botafogo	5	2	1	2	7	8	−1	7	
4	Nova Iguaçu	5	1	3	1	5	7	−2	6	
5	Boavista	5	1	1	3	6	9	−3	4	
6	Macaé	5	0	0	5	3	12	−9	0	

Rules for classification: 1) points; 2) goal difference; 3) number of goals scored.
(Q) Qualified for the phase indicated

===== Group C =====
Pos	Team	Pld	W	D	L	GF	GA	GD	Pts	Qualification
1	Fluminense (Q)	5	5	0	0	14	0	+14	15	Qualified for Semifinals
2	Vasco da Gama (Q)	5	3	0	2	6	6	0	9	Qualified for Semifinals
3	Volta Redonda	5	1	3	1	7	9	−2	6	
4	Bangu	5	1	2	2	5	10	−5	5	
5	Resende	5	1	1	3	5	6	−1	4	
6	Portuguesa	5	0	2	3	5	11	−6	2	

Rules for classification: 1) points; 2) goal difference; 3) number of goals scored.
(Q) Qualified for the phase indicated

==== Knockout stage ====
Semifinals
1	Flamengo	1
4	Vasco da Gama	0
3	Fluminense	0
2	Madureira	0

Final
Flamengo	3 (2)
Fluminense	3 (4)

===== Semi-finals =====
25 February 2017
17:00

Flamengo	1–0	Vasco da Gama
Diego 40' (pen.)	Report

Raulino de Oliveira, Volta Redonda
25 February 2017
16:30

Fluminense	0–0	Madureira
	Report

Los Larios, Duque de Caxias

===== Final =====
5 March 2017
16:00

Fluminense	3–3	Flamengo
Wellington Silva 4'; Henrique Dourado 32' (pen.); Lucas 40'	Report	8' Willian Arão; 23' Éverton; 84' Guerrero
Penalties
Lucas (penalty scored); Henrique (penalty scored); Marquinhos (penalty scored); Marcos Júnior (penalty scored)	4 - 2	(penalty scored) Diego; (penalty scored) Guerrero; (penalty missed) Réver; (penalty missed) Rafael Vaz

Nilton Santos, Rio de Janeiro
Referee: Wagner do Nascimento Magalhães

Taça Guanabara
2017 champion

10th title

=== Taça Rio ===
==== Group stage ====
===== Group B =====
Pos	Team	Pld	W	D	L	GF	GA	GD	Pts	Qualification
1	Botafogo (Q)	6	4	1	1	12	6	+6	13	Qualified for Semifinals
2	Flamengo (Q)	6	3	3	0	13	5	+8	12	Qualified for Semifinals
3	Nova Iguaçu	6	3	1	2	7	6	+1	10	
4	Boavista	6	1	2	3	8	10	−2	5	
5	Madureira	6	1	2	3	8	10	−2	5	
6	Macaé	6	0	2	4	6	13	−7	2	

Rules for classification: 1) points; 2) goal difference; 3) number of goals scored.
(Q) Qualified for the phase indicated

===== Group C =====
Pos	Team	Pld	W	D	L	GF	GA	GD	Pts	Qualification
1	Vasco da Gama (Q)	6	3	3	0	8	4	+4	12	Qualified for Semifinals
2	Fluminense (Q)	6	3	2	1	12	8	+4	11	Qualified for Semifinals
3	Volta Redonda	6	2	2	2	8	8	0	8	
4	Portuguesa	6	2	2	2	7	11	−4	8	
5	Resende	6	1	1	4	5	8	−3	4	
6	Bangu	6	1	1	4	4	10	−6	4	

Rules for classification: 1) points; 2) goal difference; 3) number of goals scored.
(Q) Qualified for the phase indicated

==== Knockout stage ====
Semifinals
1	Botafogo	3
4	Fluminense	1
3	Vasco da Gama	0
2	Flamengo	0

Final
Botafogo	0
Vasco da Gama	2

===== Semi-finals =====
8 April 2017
18:30

Botafogo	3 - 1	Fluminense
Igor Rabello 1'; Dudu Cearense 26'; Sassá 47'	Report	88' (pen.) Richarlison

Nilton Santos, Rio de Janeiro
Attendance: 7 309
Referee: Alexandre Vagas Tavas de Jesus
9 April 2017
16:00

Vasco da Gama	0 - 0	Flamengo
	Report

Maracanã, Rio de Janeiro
Attendance: 21 895
Referee: Wagner do Nascimento Magalhães

===== Final =====
16 April 2017
16:00

Vasco da Gama	2 - 0	Botafogo
Douglas 86'; Luis Fabiano 93'	Report

Nilton Santos, Rio de Janeiro
Referee: Bruno Arleu de Araújo

Taça Rio
2017 champion

10th title

== Relegation playoffs ==
Pos	Team	Pld	W	D	L	GF	GA	GD	Pts	Relegation
1	Cabofriense	6	5	1	0	15	4	+11	16	
2	Bonsucesso	6	2	2	2	5	4	+1	8	
3	Campos	6	1	3	2	8	10	−2	6	Relegation to 2017 Série B1
4	Tigres do Brasil	6	0	2	4	4	14	−10	2	Relegation to 2017 Série B1

Rules for classification: 1) points; 2) goal difference; 3) number of goals scored.

== Overall table ==
Pos	Team	Pld	W	D	L	GF	GA	GD	Pts	Qualification or relegation
1	Flamengo (A)	11	8	3	0	30	7	+23	27	Advance to Final Stage
2	Fluminense (A)	11	8	2	1	26	8	+18	26	Advance to Final Stage
3	Vasco da Gama (A)	11	6	3	2	14	10	+4	21	Advance to Final Stage
4	Botafogo (A)	11	6	2	3	19	14	+5	20	Advance to Final Stage
5	Nova Iguaçu (Q)	11	4	4	3	12	13	−1	16	2018 Série D
6	Madureira (Q)	11	4	3	4	13	15	−2	15	2018 Série D
7	Volta Redonda	11	3	5	3	15	17	−2	14	
8	Boavista	11	3	3	5	9	13	−4	12	
9	Portuguesa	11	2	4	5	12	22	−10	10	
10	Bangu	11	2	3	6	9	20	−11	9	
11	Resende (R)	11	2	2	7	10	14	−4	8	First round
12	Macaé (R)	11	0	2	9	9	25	−16	2	First round

Rules for classification: 1) points; 2) goal difference; 3) number of goals scored.
(A) Advance to a further round; (Q) Qualified for the phase indicated; (R) Relegated

=== Final stage ===
Semi-final
Flamengo	2
Botafogo	1
Fluminense	3
Vasco da Gama	0

Finals
Flamengo	1	2	3
Fluminense	0	1	1

==== Semi-finals ====
23 April 2017
16:00

Flamengo	2 - 1	Botafogo
Guerrero 47', 65' (pen.)	Report	87' (pen.) Sassá

Maracanã, Rio de Janeiro
Referee: Leonardo Garcia Cavaleiro
22 April 2017
19:00

Fluminense	3 – 0	Vasco da Gama
Richarlison 50'; Wellington Silva 55'; Leo 66'	Report

Maracanã, Rio de Janeiro
Attendance: 20 092
Referee: Rodrigo Nunes de Sá

==== Final ====
30 April 2017
16:00

Fluminense	0 - 1	Flamengo
	Report	33' Éverton

Maracanã Stadium, Rio de Janeiro
Attendance: 34926
Referee: João Batista de Arruda
7 May 2017
16:00

Flamengo	2 - 1	Fluminense
Guerrero 84'; Rodinei 90+5'	Report	3' Henrique Dourado

Maracanã Stadium, Rio de Janeiro
Attendance: 68165
Referee: Wágner do Nascimento Magalhães

Campeonato Carioca
2017 champion

34th title

== Awards ==
=== Team of the year ===
Manager: Abel Braga (Fluminense)

Pos.	Player	Club
GK	(Uruguay) Martín Silva	Vasco da Gama
DF	(Brazil) Lucas	Fluminense
DF	(Brazil) Réver	Flamengo
DF	(Brazil) Henrique	Fluminense
DF	(Peru) Miguel Trauco	Flamengo
MF	(Brazil) Douglas	Vasco da Gama
MF	(Ecuador) Junior Sornoza	Fluminense
MF	(Brazil) Diego	Flamengo
FW	(Brazil) Richarlison	Fluminense
FW	(Peru) Paolo Guerrero	Flamengo
FW	(Brazil) Wellington Silva	Fluminense

Source Globo Esporte
Last updated: 8 May 2017
