= 2010 Cannes Film Festival =

63rd Cannes Film Festival
- The festival's official poster featuring French actress Juliette Binoche
- Opening film: Robin Hood
- Closing film: The Tree
- Location: Cannes, France
- Founded: 1946
- Awards: Palme d'Or: Uncle Boonmee Who Can Recall His Past Lives
- Hosted by: Kristin Scott Thomas
- No. of films: 19 (Main Competition)
- Festival date: 12–23 May 2010
- Website: www.festival-cannes.com

Cannes Film Festival
- 2011 2009

The 63rd Cannes Film Festival took place from 12 to 23 May 2010. American filmmaker Tim Burton served as jury president for the main competition. Thai filmmaker Apichatpong Weerasethakul won the Palme d'Or, the festival's top prize, for the drama film Uncle Boonmee Who Can Recall His Past Lives.

English actress Kristin Scott Thomas was the mistress of ceremonies. Agence France-Presse, Reuters, Associated Press and Getty TV boycotted the press conference that announced the line-up for the festival, due to a dispute over access to the red carpet. In a press release, the agencies said that they "may be forced to suspend their presence at the festival altogether" if an agreement was not reached. Days before the festival was to begin, concerns were expressed that attendees might be delayed, or would not attend, due to plane flights to surrounding areas in France being delayed or canceled due to volcanic ash in the sky.

The festival opened with Robin Hood by Ridley Scott, and closed with The Tree by Julie Bertuccelli.

== Juries ==
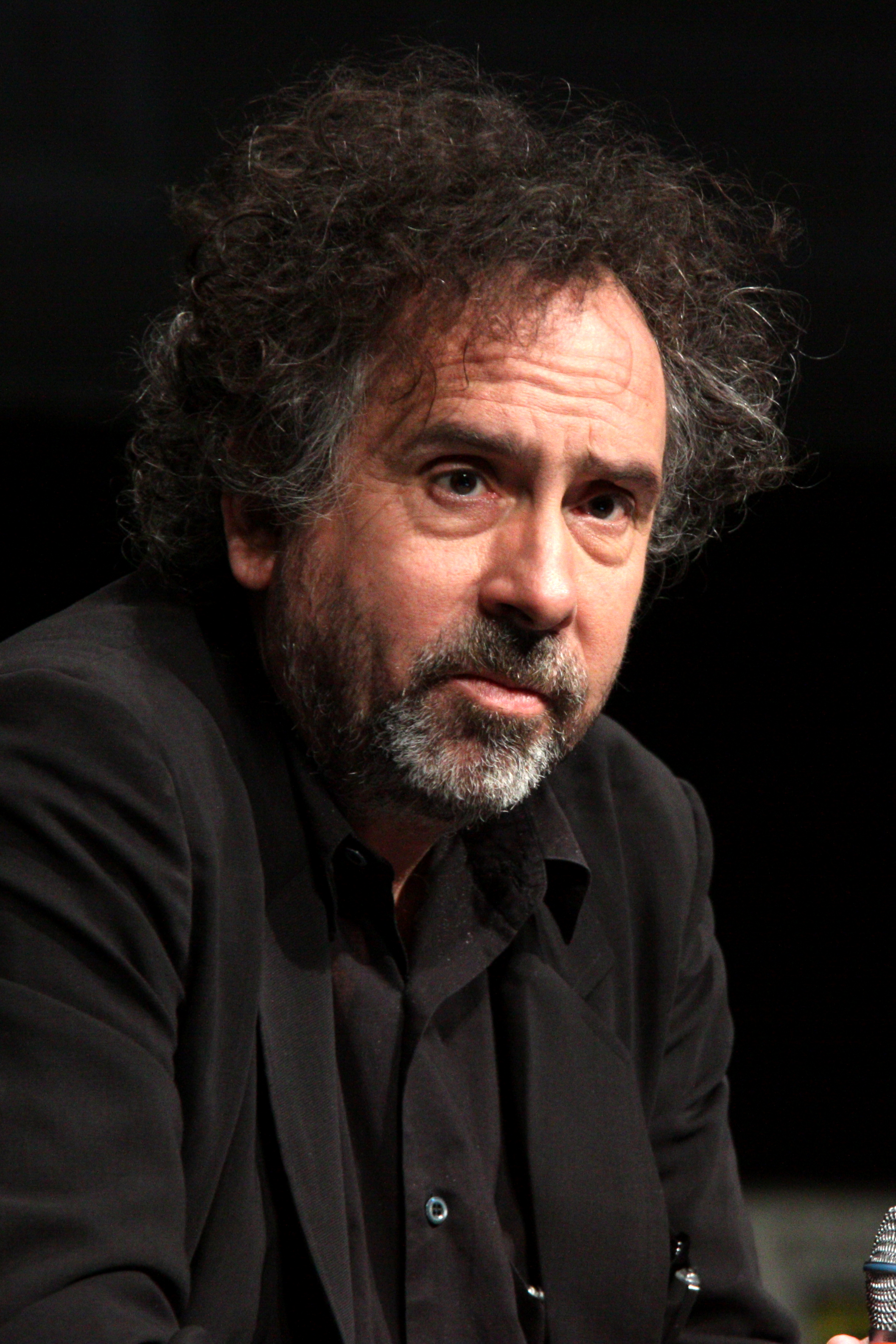
Tim Burton, President of the 2010 Competition Jury

=== Main competition ===
The following people were appointed as the Jury for the feature films of the 2010 Official Selection:

- Tim Burton, American filmmaker – Jury President
- Alberto Barbera, Italian film critic
- Kate Beckinsale, English actress
- Emmanuel Carrère, French author, screenwriter and director
- Benicio del Toro, Puerto Rican actor
- Alexandre Desplat, French composer
- Víctor Erice, Spanish filmmaker
- Shekhar Kapur, Indian director
- Giovanna Mezzogiorno, Italian actress

=== Un Certain Regard ===
- Claire Denis, French filmmaker – Jury President
- Patrick Ferla, Swiss journalist
- Kim Dong-ho, South Korean director of Busan Film Festival
- Helena Lindblad, Swedish critic
- Serge Toubiana, French General Director of the Cinémathèque Française

=== Camera d'Or ===
- Gael García Bernal, Mexican actor and director – Jury President
- Stéphane Brizé, French director
- Gérard de Battista, French cinematographer
- Didier Diaz, FICAM
- Charlotte Lipinska, French critic and member of the French Union of Critics

=== Cinéfondation and Short Films Competition ===
- Atom Egoyan, Canadian director – Jury President
- Emmanuelle Devos, French actress
- Carlos Diegues, Brazilian filmmaker
- Dinara Droukarova, Russian actress
- Marc Recha, Spanish Director

== Official Selection ==
=== In Competition ===
Two days before the beginning of the festival, the just finished film Route Irish by Ken Loach, was added to the main competition. The following feature films competed for the Palme d'Or:

English Title	Original Title	Director(s)	Production Country
Another Year		Mike Leigh	United Kingdom
Biutiful		Alejandro González Iñárritu	Mexico, Spain
Burnt by the Sun 2	Утомлённые солнцем 2	Nikita Mikhalkov	Russia
Certified Copy	Copie conforme	Abbas Kiarostami	France, Italy, Belgium
Chongqing Blues	日照重慶	Wang Xiaoshuai	China
Fair Game		Doug Liman	United States, United Arab Emirates
The Housemaid	하녀	Im Sang-soo	South Korea
My Joy	Счастье моё	Sergei Loznitsa	Ukraine, Germany, Netherlands
Of Gods and Men	Des hommes et des dieux	Xavier Beauvois	France
On Tour	Tournée	Mathieu Amalric	France, Germany
Our Life	La nostra vita	Daniele Luchetti	Italy, France
Outrage	アウトレイジ	Takeshi Kitano	Japan
Outside the Law	Hors-la-loi	Rachid Bouchareb	Algeria, France, Tunisia, Belgium
Poetry	시	Lee Chang-dong	South Korea, France
The Princess of Montpensier	La princesse de Montpensier	Bertrand Tavernier	France
Route Irish		Ken Loach	United Kingdom, France, Belgium
A Screaming Man	Un homme qui crie	Mahamat Saleh Haroun	Chad, France, Belgium
Tender Son: The Frankenstein Project	Szelíd Teremtés – A Frankenstein Terv	Kornél Mundruczó	Hungary
Uncle Boonmee Who Can Recall His Past Lives	ลุงบุญมีระลึกชาติ	Apichatpong Weerasethakul	Thailand

=== Un Certain Regard ===
The following films were selected for the competition of Un Certain Regard:

English Title	Original Title	Director(s)	Production Country
Adrienn Pál	Pál Adrienn	Ágnes Kocsis	Hungary
Aurora		Cristi Puiu	Romania
Blue Valentine		Derek Cianfrance	United States
Carancho		Pablo Trapero	Argentina, Chile, Spain, France, South Korea
Chatroom		Hideo Nakata	United Kingdom
The City Below	Unter dir die Stadt	Christoph Hochhäusler	Germany
Film Socialisme		Jean-Luc Godard	France
Hahaha	하하하	Hong Sang-soo	South Korea
Heartbeats	Les amours imaginaires	Xavier Dolan	Canada
I Wish I Knew	海上传奇	Jia Zhangke	China
Life, Above All		Oliver Schmitz	South Africa
Lights Out	Qu'est-il arrivé à Simon Werner?	Fabrice Gobert	France
The Lips	Los labios	Iván Fund and Santiago Loza	Argentina
October	Octubre	Daniel Vega, Diego Vega	Peru
Rebecca H. (Return to the Dogs)		Lodge Kerrigan	United States, France
R U There		David Verbeek	Netherlands, Taiwan
The Strange Case of Angelica	O estranho caso de Angélica	Manoel de Oliveira	Portugal
Tuesday, After Christmas	Marţi, după Crăciun	Radu Muntean	Romania
Udaan		Vikramaditya Motwane	India

=== Out of Competition ===
The following films were selected to be screened out of competition:

English Title	Original Title	Director(s)	Production Country
The Autobiography of Nicolae Ceaușescu	Autobiografia lui Nicolae Ceaușescu	Andrei Ujică	Romania
Black Heaven	L'Autre monde	Gilles Marchand	France, Belgium
Carlos		Olivier Assayas	France, Germany
Kaboom		Gregg Araki	United States
Robin Hood (opening film)		Ridley Scott	United States, United Kingdom
Tamara Drewe		Stephen Frears	United Kingdom
The Tree (closing film)		Julie Bertuccelli	France, Australia
Wall Street: Money Never Sleeps		Oliver Stone	United States
You Will Meet a Tall Dark Stranger		Woody Allen	United States

=== Special Screenings ===
The following films were selected to be screened:

English Title	Original Title	Director(s)	Production Country
5x Favela	5x Favela, por nós mesmos	Wagner Novais, Manaira Carneiro, Rodrigo Felha, Cacau Amaral, Luciano Vidigal, Cadu Barcelos and Luciana Bezerra	Brazil
Abel		Diego Luna	Mexico
Chantrapas		Otar Iosseliani	France, Georgia
Countdown to Zero		Lucy Walker	United States
Draquila – Italy Trembles	Draquila - L'Italia che trema	Sabina Guzzanti	Italy
Gilles Jacob, Citizen Cannes	Gilles Jacob, l'arpenteur de la croisette	Serge Le Peron	France
Inside Job		Charles Ferguson	United States
The Pack	La meute	Franck Richard	France, Belgium
Nostalgia for the Light	Nostalgia de la luz	Patricio Guzmán	France, Chile
Over Your Cities Grass Will Grow		Sophie Fiennes	United Kingdom

=== Cinéfondation ===
The following short films were selected for the competition of Cinéfondation:

English Title	Original Title	Director(s)	School
Anywhere Out of the World	Coucou-Les-Nuages	Vincent Cardona	La fémis, France
Cooked		Jens Blank	NFTS, United Kingdom
Dakujem, dobre		Mátyás Prikler	FTF-VŠMU, Slovakia
The Fifth Column	Hinkerort Zorasune	Vatche Boulghourjian	NYU, United States
Frozen Land		Tae-yong Kim	Sejong University, South Korea
Here I Am	Itt Vagyok	Bálint Szimler	SzFE, Hungary
I Already Am Everything I Want to Have	Ja Vec Jesam Sve Ono Što Želim Da Imam	Dane Komljen	FDU, Serbia
Ijsland	Iceland	Gilles Coulier	Sint-Lukas University, Belgium
El Juego		Benjamín Naishtat	Le Fresnoy, France
Los Minutos, Las Horas		Marques Ribeiro	EICTV, Cuba
Miramare		Michaela Müller	ALU, Croatia
The Painting Sellers	Taulukauppiaat	Juho Kuosmanen	Aalto University, Finland
Shelley		Andrew Wesman	Harvard University, United States

=== Short Films Competition ===
The following short films competed for the Short Film Palme d'Or:

English Title	Original Title	Director(s)	Production Country
Barking Island	Chienne d'histoire	Serge Avédikian	France
Bathing Micky	Micky bader	Frida Kempff	Sweden
Blocks	Blokes	Marially Rivas	Chile
First Aid	Ezra rishona	Yarden Karmin	Israel
Maya		Pedro Pío	Cuba
Muscles		Edward Housden	Australia
Rosa		Monica Lairana	Argentina
Station	Estação	Marcia Faria	Brazil
To Swallow a Toad		Jurģis Krāsons	Latvia

=== Cannes Classics ===
The following films were selected to be screened:

English Title	Original Title	Director(s)	Production Country
Restored Prints
The 317th Platoon (1964)	La 317ème section	Pierre Schoendoerffer	France
The African Queen (1951)		John Huston	United States, United Kingdom
The Battle of the Rails (1946)	La Bataille du rail	René Clément	France
La campagne de Cicéron (1989)		Jacques Davila	France
The Great Love (1969)	Le grand amour	Pierre Etaix	France
Happy Go Lucky (1946)	Au petit bonheur	Marcel L'Herbier	France
Khandhar (1983)		Mrinal Sen	India
Kiss of the Spider Woman (1985)	O Beijo da Mulher-Aranha	Hector Babenco	Brazil, United States
The Leopard (1963)	Il Gattopardo	Luchino Visconti	Italy
Psycho (1960)		Alfred Hitchcock	United States
The Tin Drum (1979)	Die Blechtrommel	Volker Schlöndorff	West Germany, Poland, Yugoslavia, France
Tristana (1970)		Luis Buñuel	Spain, France, Italy
World Cinema Foundation
The Eloquent Peasant (1970)	الفلاح الفصيح	Shadi Abdel Salam	Egypt
Il ruscello di Ripasottile (1941)		Roberto Rossellini	Italy
Two Girls on the Street (1939)	Két Lány Az Utcán	Andre de Toth	Hungary
Revenge (1989)	Месть	Yermek Shinarbayev	Soviet Union
A River Called Titas (1973)	Titash Ekti Nadir Naam	Ritwik Ghatak	Bangladesh
Documentaries about Cinema
...But Film is My Mistress	...Men filmen är min älskarinna	Stig Björkman	Sweden
Cameraman: The Life and Work of Jack Cardiff		Craig McCall	United Kingdom
Hollywood Don't Surf!		Greg MacGillivray and Sam George	United States
Toscan		Isabelle Partiot-Pieri	France

=== Cinéma de la Plage ===
The Cinéma de la Plage section line-up includes classics films, commemorations and world premieres of new productions at the Cannes' Plage Macé. The following films were selected to be screened:

English Title	Original Title	Director(s)	Production Country
From Here to Eternity (1953)		Fred Zinnemann	United States
The Girl Hunters (1963)		Roy Rowland	United Kingdom
Rock'n'roll... Of Corse!		Stéphane Bébert, Lionel Guedj	France
The Silent World (1956)	Le Monde du silence	Louis Malle, Jacques-Yves Cousteau	France, Italy
That Night in Varennes (1982)	La Nuit de Varennes	Ettore Scola	France, Italy
The Two Escobars (30 for 30)		Jeff Zimbalist and Michael Zimbalist	United States

== Parallel sections ==
=== Critics' Week ===
The following films were screened for the 49th Critics' Week (49e Semaine de la Critique):

English Title	Original Title	Director(s)	Production Country
In Competition
Armadillo		Janus Metz Pedersen	Denmark
Bedevilled	김복남 살인사건의 전말	Jang Cheol-soo	South Korea
Dear Prudence	Belle Épine	Rebecca Zlotowski	France
Bi, Don't Be Afraid	Bi, dung so!	Di Dang Phan	Vietnam, France, Germany
Sandcastle	沙城	Boo Junfeng	Singapore
Sound of Noise		Ola Simonsson and Johannes Stjärne Nilsson	Sweden, France
The Myth of the American Sleepover		David Robert Mitchell	United States
Special Screenings
Copacabana		Marc Fitoussi	France
The Names of Love	Le Nom des gens	Michel Leclerc	France
Rubber		Quentin Dupieux	France
Women Are Heroes		JR	France
Short Films Competition
A Distração		Ivan Cavi Borges and Gustavo Melo	Brazil
Berik		Daniel Borgman	Denmark
The Boy Who Wanted to Be a Lion		Alois di Leo	United Kingdom
Deeper Than Yesterday		Ariel Kleiman	Australia
Love Patate		Gilles Cuvelier	France
Native Son		Scott Graham	United Kingdom
Vasco		Sébastien Laudenbach	France
Short Films – Special Screenings
L'Amour-propre		Nicolas Silhol	France
Bastard		Kirsten Dunst	United States
The Clerk’s Tale		James Franco	United States
Cynthia todavía tienes las llaves		Gonzalo Tobal	Argentina
Fracture		Nicolas Sarkissian	France

=== Directors' Fortnight ===
The documentary film Benda Bilili! about disabled Kinshasa street musicians Staff Benda Bilili had its world premiere at the festival, with the group in attendance and performing at the Director's Fortnight opening party. The following films were screened for the 2010 Directors' Fortnight (Quinzaine des Réalizateurs):

English Title	Original Title	Director(s)	Production Country
A Alegria	The Joy	Felipe Bragança and Marina Meliande	Brazil
All Good Children		Alicia Duffy	Belgium, France, United Kingdom
Benda Bilili!		Renaud Barret and Florent de La Tullaye	Democratic Republic of the Congo, France
Boxing Gym		Frederick Wiseman	United States
Cleveland versus Wall Street	Cleveland contre Wall Street	Jean-Stéphane Bron	Switzerland, France
Des filles en noir		Jean Paul Civeyrac	France
Everything Will Be Fine	Alting bliver godt igen	Christoffer Boe	Denmark, Sweden, France
Illegal	Illégal	Olivier Masset-Depasse	Belgium, Luxembourg, France
The Invisible Eye	La mirada invisible	Diego Lerman	Argentina, France, Spain
Leap Year	Año bisiesto	Michael Rowe	Mexico
The Light Thief	Свет-аке	Aktan Abdykalykov	Kirghizistan, Germany, France, Netherlands
Love Like Poison	Un poison violent	Katell Quillévéré	France
Petit bébé Jésus de Flandre		Gust Van Den Berghe	Belgium
Picco		Philip Koch	Germany
Pieds nus sur les limaces		Fabienne Berthaud	France
Le quattro volte		Michelangelo Frammartino	Italy, Germany, Switzerland
Shit Year		Cam Archer	United States
The Silent House		Gustavo Hernández Pérez	Uruguay
The Tiger Factory		Ming jin Woo	Malaysia, Japan
Two Gates of Sleep		Alistair Banks Griffin	United States
Le Vagabond		Avishai Sivan	Israel
We Are What We Are	Somos lo que hay	Jorge Michel Grau	Mexico
You All Are Captains	Todos vós sodes capitáns	Oliver Laxe	Spain
Short Films
Cautare		Ionuţ Piţurescu	Romania
Light		André Schreuders	Netherlands
Mary Last Seen		Sean Durkin	United States
Petit tailleur		Louis Garrel	France
Shadows of Silence		Pradeepan Raveendran	France, Sri Lanka
Shikasha		Isamu Hirabayashi	Japan
A Silent Child		Jesper Klevenås	Sweden
Three Hours		Annarita Zambrano	Italy, France
ZedCrew		Noah Pink	Canada, Zambia

== Official Awards ==
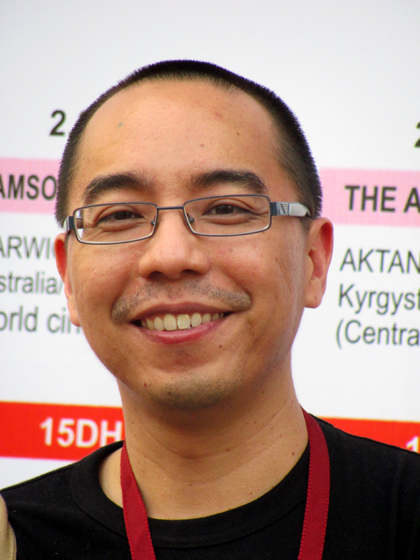
Apichatpong Weerasethakul, winner of the 2010 Palme d'Or

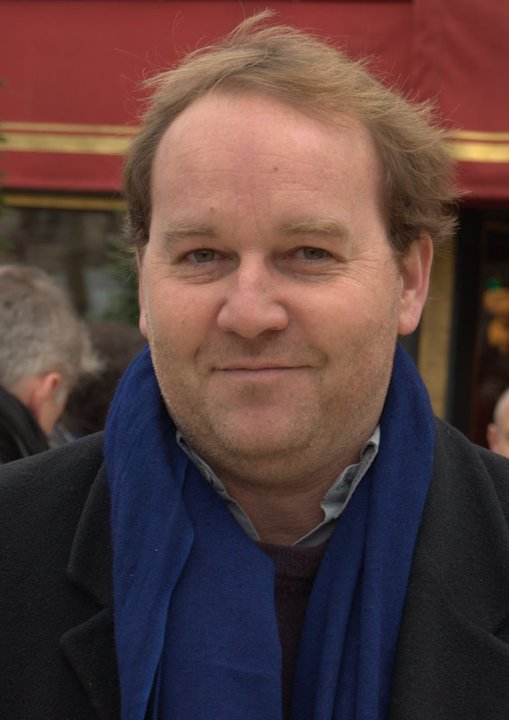
Xavier Beauvois, winner of the 2010 Gran Prix

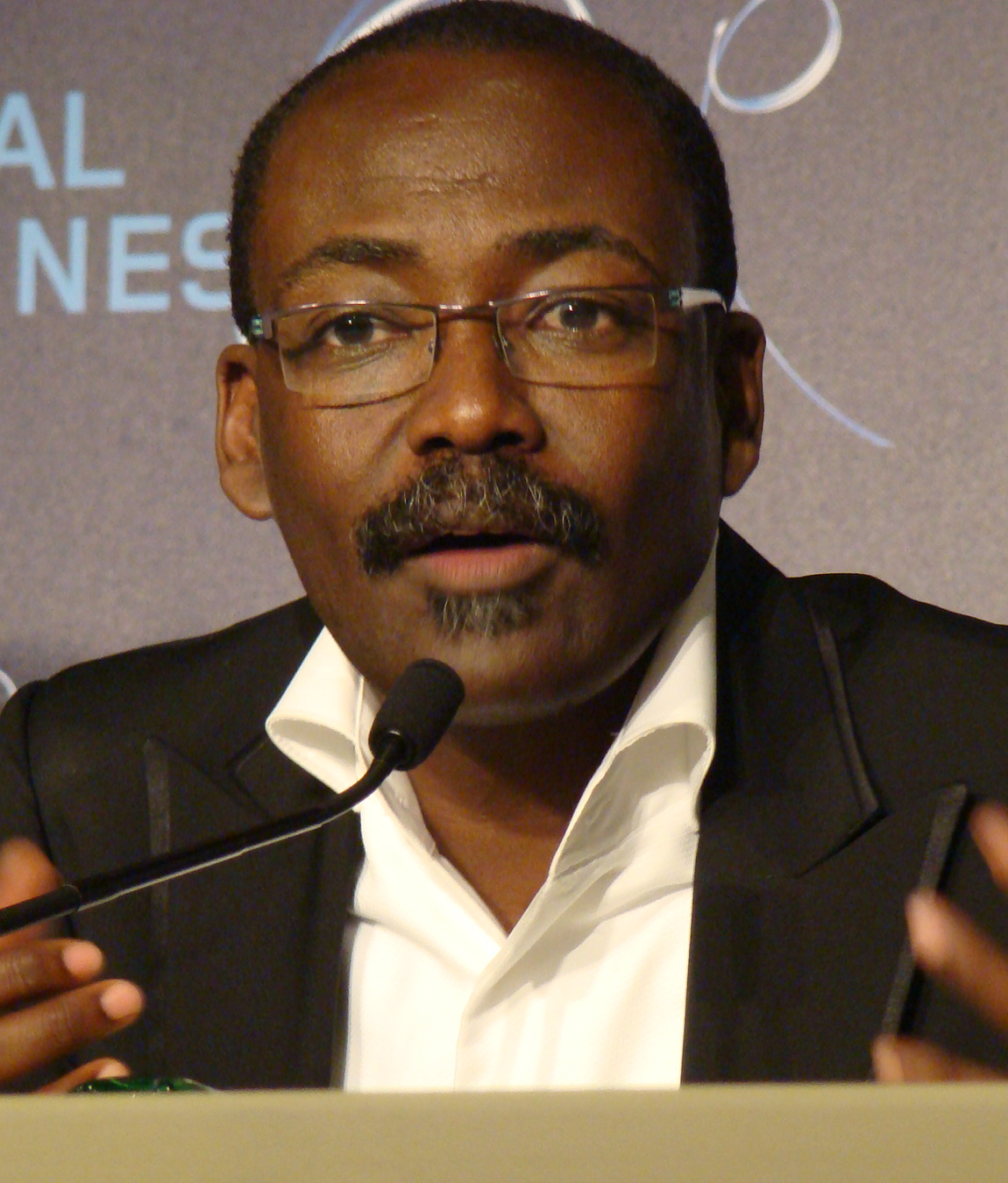
Mahamat-Saleh Haroun at the festival for his film A Screaming Man

The Palme d'Or was won by the Thai film Uncle Boonmee Who Can Recall His Past Lives directed by Apichatpong Weerasethakul. It was the first time that an Asian movie won the award since 1997. Tim Burton, chairman of the jury that determined the award, stated about its decision: "You always want to be surprised by films and this film did that for most of us". French film Of Gods and Men was the runner up. The Xavier Beauvois' film had been considered a favorite alongside Mike Leigh's Another Year. During the ceremony special attention was paid to Iranian filmmaker Jafar Panahi in hopes of increasing international pressure on the Iranian government to release Panahi from jail.

The following films and people received the 2010 Official selection awards:

=== In Competition ===
- Palme d'Or: Uncle Boonmee Who Can Recall His Past Lives by Apichatpong Weerasethakul
- Grand Prix: Of Gods and Men by Xavier Beauvois
- Best Director: Mathieu Amalric for On Tour
- Best Screenplay: Poetry by Lee Chang-dong
- Best Actress: Juliette Binoche for Certified Copy
- Best Actor:
  - Javier Bardem for Biutiful
  - Elio Germano for Our Life
- Prix du Jury: A Screaming Man by Mahamat-Saleh Haroun

=== Un Certain Regard ===
- Prix Un Certain Regard: Hahaha by Hong Sang-soo
- Un Certain Regard Jury Prize: October by Daniel Vega, Diego Vega
- Un Certain Regard Best Actress Award: Adela Sanchez, Eva Bianco, Victoria Raposo for The Lips

=== Cinéfondation ===
- First Prize: The Painting Sellers by Juho Kuosmanen
- 2nd Prize: Anywhere Out of the World by Vincent Cardona
- 3rd Prize:
  - The Fifth Column by Vatche Boulghourjian
  - I Already Am Everything I Want to Have by Dane Komljen

=== Golden Camera ===
- Caméra d'Or: Año Bisiesto by Michael Rowe

=== Short films ===
- Short Film Palme d'Or: Barking Island by Serge Avédikian
- Short Film Jury Prize: Bathing Micky by Frida Kempff

== Independent awards ==
=== FIPRESCI Prizes ===
- On Tour by Mathieu Amalric (In Competition)
- Adrienn Pál by Ágnes Kocsis (Un Certain Regard)
- You All Are Captains by Oliver Laxe (Directors' Fortnight)

=== Vulcan Award of the Technical Artist ===
- Vulcan Award: Leslie Shatz, Bob Beemer, Jon Taylor (Sound Department) for Biutiful

=== Ecumenical Jury ===
- Prize of the Ecumenical Jury: Of Gods and Men by Xavier Beauvois
  - Special Mention:
  - Another Year by Mike Leigh
  - Poetry by Lee Chang-dong

=== Critics' Week ===
- Critics' Week Grand Prize: Armadillo by Janus Metz Pedersen
- SACD Award: Bi, Don't Be Afraid by Di Dang Phan
- ACID Award: Bi, Don't Be Afraid by Di Dang Phan
- Young Critics Award: Sound of Noise by Ola Simonsson, Johannes Stjärne Nilsson
- Canal+ Gran Prix for short film: Berik by Daniel Joseph Borgman
- Kodak Discovery Award for Best Short Film: Deeper Than Yesterday by Ariel Kleiman

=== Regards Jeunes Prize ===
- Heartbeats by Xavier Dolan

=== Prix François Chalais ===
- Life, Above All by Oliver Schmitz
