= The Seal: Number 10 from the Street =

La Foquita: El 10 de la calle
- Theatrical release poster
- Directed by: Martin Casapía Casanova
- Written by: Güido Simonetti; Viviana Nigro
- Produced by: Jorge Olivas; Carlos Linares
- Starring: Jean Franco Sánchez; Juan Carlos Rey de Castro; Anaí Padilla; Eva Ayllón; Ray del Castillo; Rey del Castillo
- Cinematography: Gabriel Di Martino
- Edited by: Roberto Benavides
- Music by: German Tello
- Production companies: Lfante Films; América Televisión; Movistar
- Distributed by: New Century Films
- Release dates: January 30, 2020 (Peru); April 16, 2020 (Chile)
- Running time: 100 minutes
- Country: Peru
- Language: Spanish
- Box office: S/ 10,132,500.00

The Seal: Number 10 from the Street (Spanish: La Foquita: El 10 de la calle) is a 2020 Peruvian biographical drama film based on the life of football player Jefferson Farfán, produced by Lfante Films and distributed by New Century Films, the Peruvian affiliate of Warner Bros. in Peru. It is directed by Martin Casapía Casanova and written by Argentine screenwriters Güido Simonetti and Viviana Negro. It will star Jean Franco Sánchez, Juan Carlos Rey de Castro, Eva Ayllón, Anaí Padilla and Ramón García. The film narrates the life of the soccer player from his childhood on his professional path in the sport until the prelude to the 2018 FIFA World Cup.

The film premiered on January 30 at the national level in Peru, with approximately 50,000 viewers on its opening day, and to date more than 965,000 viewers. Based on its spectator attendance and the average number of admissions in the Peruvian film industry, the film has grossed approximately more than 10 million soles, and has broken some records in its total run, dethroning Guerrero about the life of Paolo Guerrero, and becoming the highest-grossing Peruvian film about Peruvian soccer in history.

== Synopsis ==
It tells the story of the famous Peruvian soccer player Jefferson Farfán, from his troubled childhood to the 2018 FIFA World Cup.

== Cast ==
- Jean Franco Sánchez as Jefferson Farfán.
  - Ray del Castillo as teenage Farfán.
  - Rey del Castillo as Farfán as a child.
- Juan Carlos Rey de Castro as Raúl González, Jefferson's representative.
- Anaí Padilla as Charo Guadalupe, Jefferson's mother.
- Eva Ayllón as Peregrina, Jefferson's grandmother.
- Ramón García
- Stephanie Orue
- Tulio Loza
- Emilram Cossío
- Pold Gastello
- Juan Manuel Ochoa
- Guillermo Castañeda
- Joaquín Escobar
- Gonzalo Molina
- Nancy Cavagnari
- Thiago Vernal as Claudio, Jefferson's teammate.
- Mariella Zanetti
- Rony Shapiama as Paolo Guerrero as a teenager, a friend of Jefferson.

Additionally, the actual participation of former soccer players belonging to Alianza Lima, such as Waldir Sáenz, José Soto Gómez, Marko Ciurlizza and Juan José Jayo Legario, was confirmed.

== Production ==
In November 2018, the film was announced under the name J.F. La Foquita, and was scheduled to premiere at the end of 2019, also confirming the direction under Casapía Casanova. As the months went by, on May 6, 2019, the film was confirmed, and renamed La Foquita: El 10 de la calle, advancing the performance of the brothers del Castillo, Ray and Rey in a teaser, months before from the main shoot of the film. After a call to find the one who would play Jefferson Farfán, Anaí Padilla was confirmed to play Charo, the mother of the protagonist, while the brothers del Castillo were re-confirmed, and finally Jean Franco Sánchez (at that time, like Franco Robles) to be an adult Jefferson Farfán. Simultaneously, Juan Carlos Rey de Castro, Ramón García, Stephanie Orúe, Eva Ayllón and others were revealed to be part of the cast.

Filming began on July 23, 2019 at Villa El Salvador, which was shot entirely using a Arri Alexa. Among other places, the film was also filmed at the Alejandro Villanueva Stadium. Finally, the film finished its days of filming at the end of August.

== Marketing ==
The first teaser for the film was released on May 6, 2019, weeks before it went into filming. The official poster was released on November 6, 2019.

== Home Video ==
Due to the COVID-19 pandemic hitting theaters in Peru, the film premiered on Netflix on June 16, 2020. Subsequently, it premiered on an open signal on América Televisión on June 27, 2020, achieving first place in the audience index with 18.6 points, beating El Wasap de JB (12.9 points) and El Reventonazo de la Chola (12.6 points).

On February 18, 2022, the film was released on HBO Max exclusively in the United States while airing on HBO Latino until March 25, 2022.
