= El Mudo =

El Mudo (Spanish for "The Mute") may refer to:

- Juan Fernández Navarrete (1526–1579), Spanish painter
- Carlos Gardel (1890–1935), French-born Argentine singer, songwriter, composer and actor known ironically as "El Mudo"
- El Mudo (film), a 2013 Peruvian film
