= The Fifth Column (film) =

- Directed by: Vatche Boulghourjian
- Written by: Vatche Boulghourjian
- Produced by: Mahalia Cohen
- Cinematography: Vatche Boulghourjian
- Edited by: Vatche Boulghourjian
- Production company: Rebus Film Production
- Release date: May 20, 2010 (Cannes)
- Country: Lebanon
- Language: Armenian

The Fifth Column (Armenian: Հինգերորդ Զօրասիւն, lit. 'Hinkerort Zorasune') is a Lebanese-American short film, directed by Vatche Boulghourjian. The film depicts an atmosphere of desperation in the Armenian quarter Bourj Hammoud, a suburb of Beirut. The film is entirely in Western Armenian dialect.

It competed in the 2010 Cannes Film Festival where it was awarded 3rd Prize by the Cinéfondation, La Sélection. In August 2010 it was presented at the opening night of the Lebanese Film Festival in Beirut where it won 1st Prize, Best Film. The Fifth Column was screened at the Abu Dhabi Film Festival in October 2010, where it won Best Student Short Film, 1st Prize.

It was also presented at the San Sebastian International Film Festival, the Doha Tribeca Film Festival, Beirut Cinema Days, and the Golden Apricot International Film Festival. In January 2011 the film was presented at Emir Kusturica's Kustendorf Film & Music Festival, and was awarded the Film Critics' Press Award.

== Cast ==
- Harry Simitian – Hrag
- Vartan Megeurdichian – Mher, Father
- Boghos Sbadjian – The Projectionist
- Manuel Markarian – Mr. Jano, the Cobbler
- Zohrab Nalbandian – The Principle
- Melkon Boudakian – Boy 1
- David Daoud – Boy 2
- Hovsep Kaplanian – Suren, the Grocer
- Linda Megeurdichian – Arpi, the Pharmacist
- Sako Ohanian – The Internet Café Manager
- Marie-Rose Manougian – Araxi, Grandmother
- Aida Srabonian – The Nurse
- Kevork Nalbandian – The Policeman
- Berge Fazlian – The Priest

== See also ==
- Cinema of Lebanon
