= October (2010 film) =

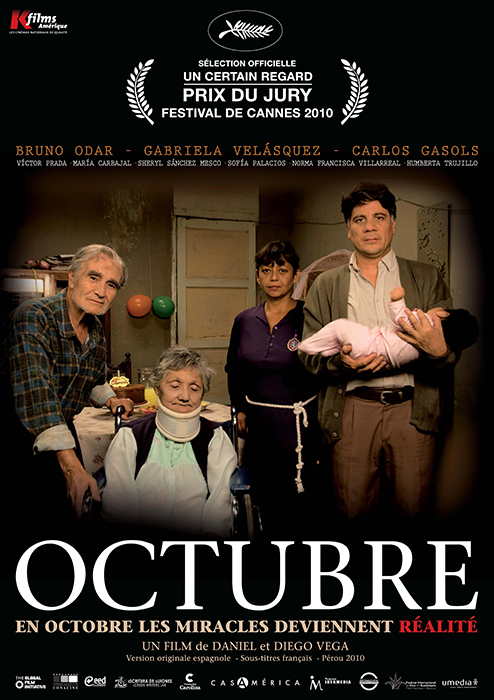
- Spanish: Octubre)
- Directed by: Daniel Vega Vidal; Diego Vega Vidal
- Written by: Daniel Vega Vidal; Diego Vega Vidal
- Starring: Bruno Odar; Gabriela Velásquez; Carlos Gassols
- Release dates: 19 May 2010 (Cannes); 7 October 2010 (Peru)
- Running time: 90 minutes
- Countries: Peru; Spain; Venezuela
- Language: Spanish

October (Spanish: Octubre) is a 2010 black comedy-drama film written, produced and directed by Daniel and Diego Vega Vidal. The film was screened in the Un Certain Regard section at the 2010 Cannes Film Festival. The film was selected as the Peruvian entry for the Best Foreign Language Film at the 84th Academy Awards, but it did not make the final shortlist. It is a co-production between Peru, Spain and Venezuela.

== Plot ==
The film tells the story of Clemente, a moneylender of few words, who might be a new hope for Sofía, his single neighbor. She is a devoted worshiper of Our Lord of the Miracles, a traditional religious image. They're brought together over a new-born baby, fruit of Clemente's relationship with a prostitute who's nowhere to be found. While Clemente is looking for the girl's mother, Sofía cares for the baby and looks after the moneylender's house. With the arrival of these beings in his life, Clemente has the opportunity to reconsider his emotional relations with people.

== Cast ==
- Bruno Odar as Clemente
- Gabriela Velásquez as Sofía
- Carlos Gassols as Don Fico
- María Carbajal
- Víctor Prada
- Sofía Palacios
- Norma Francisca Villarreal
- Humberta Trujillo

== See also ==
- List of submissions to the 84th Academy Awards for Best Foreign Language Film
- List of Peruvian submissions for the Academy Award for Best Foreign Language Film
