= Uncle Boonmee Who Can Recall His Past Lives =

2010 film

- English-language release poster by Chris Ware
- Thai: ลุงบุญมีระลึกชาติ
- Directed by: Apichatpong Weerasethakul
- Written by: Apichatpong Weerasethakul
- Based on: A Man Who Can Recall His Past Lives by Phra Sripariyattiweti
- Produced by: Simon Field; Keith Grifith; Charles de Meaux; Apichatpong Weerasethakul
- Starring: Thanapat Saisaymar; Jenjira Pongpas; Sakda Kaewbuadee
- Cinematography: Sayombhu Mukdeeprom; Yukontorn Mingmongkon; Charin Pengpanich
- Edited by: Lee Chatametikool
- Production company: Kick the Machine
- Distributed by: Kick the Machine
- Release dates: 21 May 2010 (Cannes); 25 June 2010 (Thailand)
- Running time: 114 minutes
- Country: Thailand
- Languages: Isan; Thai

Uncle Boonmee Who Can Recall His Past Lives (Thai: ลุงบุญมีระลึกชาติ; RTGS: Lung Bunmi Raluek Chat) is a 2010 Thai fantasy drama film written, produced, and directed by Apichatpong Weerasethakul. The film, which explores themes of reincarnation, centers on the last days in the life of its title character, played by Thanapat Saisaymar. Together with his loved ones—including the spirit of his dead wife, Huay, and his lost son, Boonsong, who has returned in a non-human form—Boonmee explores his past lives as he contemplates the reasons for his illness.

The film was inspired by the 1983 book A Man Who Can Recall His Past Lives by Buddhist abbot Phra Sripariyattiweti. The film is the final installment in a multi-platform art project by Apichatpong called "Primitive". It premiered at the 2010 Cannes Film Festival, where it won the Palme d'Or, becoming the first Thai film to do so. Several critics and publications consider it to be one of the greatest films ever made.

== Plot ==
In a grassy area, a water buffalo breaks free from a rope tethering it to a tree. It wanders into a forest, where it is spotted by a man holding a sickle. The man begins to lead it somewhere, while a silhouette with red glowing eyes watches.

Boonmee lives in a house on a farm with his sister-in-law Jen and his nephew Tong. Boonmee is suffering from a failing kidney; his Laotian assistant Jaai administers peritoneal dialysis treatments to him. One night, while Boonmee, Jen and Tong are eating dinner together, the ghost of Boonmee's wife Huay appears. Huay, who died nineteen years ago, says that she heard Jen and Boonmee's prayers for her, and is aware of Boonmee's poor health. A hairy, red-eyed figure joins them, and is revealed to be Boonmee's long-lost son Boonsong. Boonsong, who practiced photography, had disappeared six years after Huay died. Boonsong was searching for a creature—whom he calls a "Monkey Ghost"—that he had captured in one of his photos. He says that he mated with a Monkey Ghost, causing his hair to grow longer and his pupils to dilate, and that, after meeting his mate, he forgot "the old world".

During the day, on the farm with Jen, Boonmee asserts that his illness is a result of karma. He claims that it was caused by his killing of communists while serving in the military, and his killing of bugs on the farm.

A princess is carried through a forest in a litter. She walks near a waterfall, and gazes at her reflection in the water, which she perceives to be more youthful and beautiful than her real appearance. She is kissed by one of her servants, but insists that he imagined kissing her reflection. The servant departs, and she sits by the water and weeps. She is complimented by a catfish, prompting her to enter the water. She makes offerings of her jewelry in return for being made to look like her reflection, and then has intercourse with the catfish.

Boonmee lies in bed near a sitting Huay, who has just administered his dialysis treatment. He hugs her, and asks about how he might be able to find her in the afterlife. She tells him that the spirits of the deceased are not attached to locations, but to people. Later, Boonmee, Huay, Jen and Tong venture out into the forest. Jen and Tong see shadowy figures running through the bushes and leaping between the trees. Huay leads Boonmee, Jen and Tong into a cave. Boonmee believes that he was born in the cave, in a past life he cannot recall. He recounts a dream of a future civilisation in which authorities shine "a light" on "past people", causing them to disappear. Huay disconnects Boonmee's dialysis tube. By the next day, Boonmee is dead.

Following Boonmee's funeral, Jen sits on a bed, organising gifts of baht with her friend Roong. Tong, now a monk, arrives, saying that he has been having difficulty sleeping at the temple. He showers and changes from his robes to a T-shirt and jeans. While preparing to go out to eat with Jen, he is stunned to see himself, Jen and Roong on the bed, watching television. He and Jen leave for a restaurant, while another him, another Jen and Roong remain on the bed.

== Cast ==
- Thanapat Saisaymar as Uncle Boonmee
- Natthakarn Aphaiwong as Huay, Boonmee's wife
- Jeerasak Kulhong as Boonsong, Boonmee's son
- Jenjira Pongpas as Jen
- Sakda Kaewbuadee as Tong
- Kanokporn Thongaram as Roong, Jen's friend
- Samud Kugasang as Jai, Boonmee's chief worker
- Wallapa Mongkolprasert as the princess
- Sumit Suebsee as the soldier
- Vien Pimdee as the farmer

== Themes ==
Uncle Boonmee Who Can Recall His Past Lives is the final installment in a multi-platform art project "Primitive". The project deals with the Isan region in Thailand's northeast, and in particular the village of Nabua in Nakhon Phanom, near the Laos border. Previous installments include a seven-part video installation and the two short films A Letter to Uncle Boonmee and Phantoms of Nabua, both of which premiered in 2009. The project explores themes of memories, transformation and extinction, and touches on a violent 1965 crackdown on communist sympathisers in Nabua by the Thai army. Regarding the feature film's place within the overarching project, Apichatpong has said that it "echoes other works in the 'Primitive' installation, which is about this land in Isan with a brutal history. But I'm not making a political film - it's more like a personal diary."

According to Weerasethakul, the film is primarily about "objects and people that transform or hybridise". A central theme is the transformation and possible extinction of cinema itself. The film consists of six reels each shot in a different cinematic style. The styles include, by the words of the director, "old cinema with stiff acting and classical staging", "documentary style", "costume drama" and "my kind of film when you see long takes of animals and people driving". Weerasethakul further explained in an interview with Bangkok Post: "When you make a film about recollection and death, you realise that cinema is also facing death. Uncle Boonmee is one of the last pictures shot on film - now everybody shoots digital. It's my own little lamentation".

== Production ==
Apichatpong Weerasethakul says that a man named Boonmee approached Phra Sripariyattiweti, the abbot of a Buddhist temple in his home town, claiming he could clearly remember his own previous lives while meditating. The abbot was so impressed with Boonmee's ability that he published a book called A Man Who Can Recall His Past Lives in 1983. By the time Apichatpong read the book, Boonmee had died. The original idea was to adapt the book into a biographical film about Boonmee. However, that was soon abandoned to make room for a more personal film, while still using the book's structure and content as inspiration. The stories and production designs were inspired by old television shows and Thai comic books, which often used simple plots and were filled with supernatural elements.

The film was an international co-production between Weerasethakul's company Kick the Machine, Britain's Illuminations Films, France's Anna Sanders Films, Germany's The Match Factory and Geissendörfer Film- und Fernsehproduktion and Spain's Eddie Saeta. It received 3.5 million baht in support from the Royal Thai Ministry of Culture.

Filming took place between October 2009 and February 2010, as the weather conditions allowed, both in Bangkok and the northeast of Thailand, Isan. The movie was shot with 16 mm film instead of digital video both for budgetary reasons and to give the film a look similar to that of classic Thai cinema.

I was old enough to catch the television shows that used to be shot on 16 mm film. They were done in studio with strong, direct lighting. The lines were whispered to the actors, who mechanically repeated them. The monsters were always in the dark to hide the cheaply made costumes. Their eyes were red lights so that the audience could spot them.

— Apichatpong Weerasethakul

== Release ==
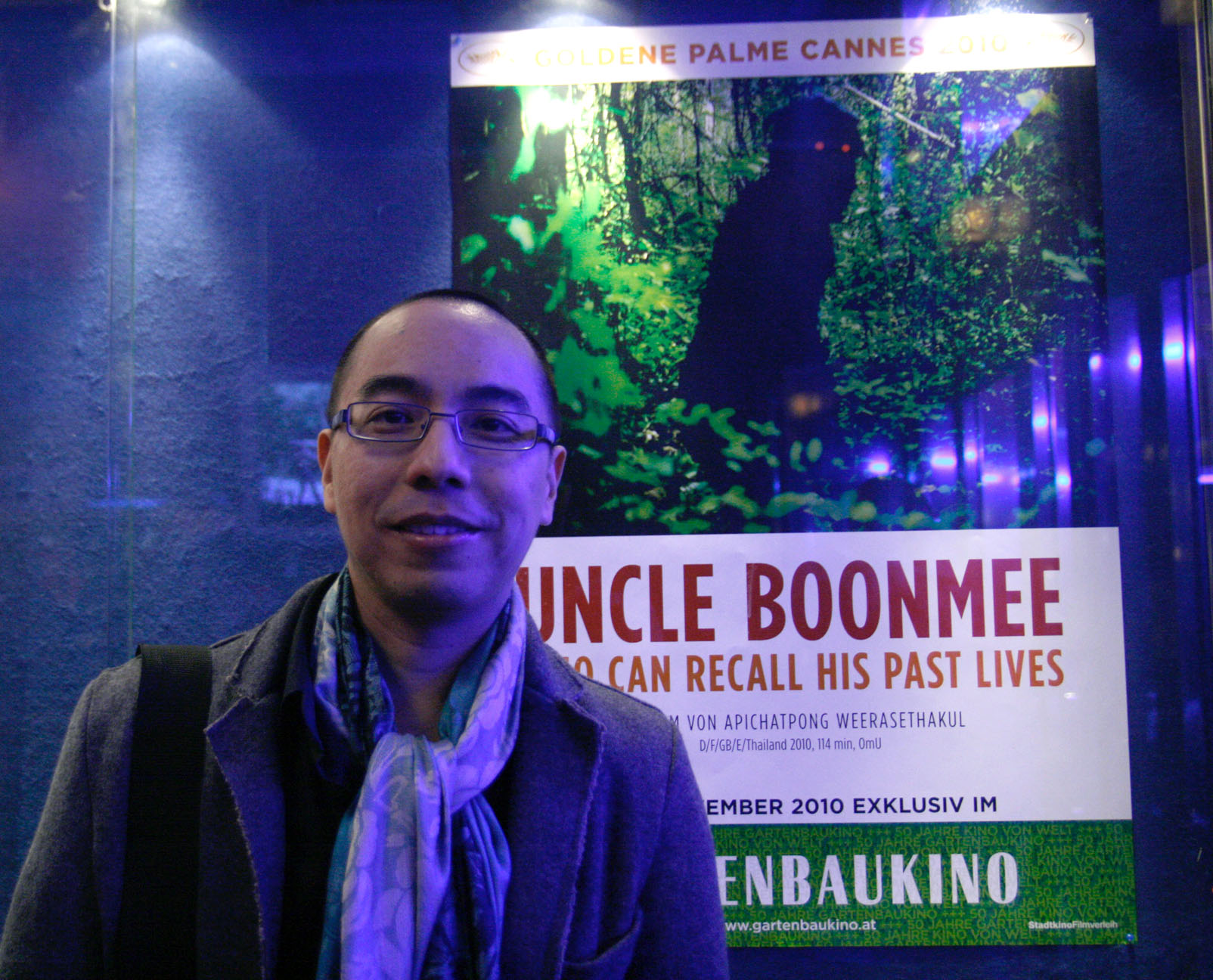
Apichatpong Weerasethakul (Viennale 2010)

The film premiered in competition at the Cannes Film Festival on 21 May 2010. Theatrical distribution in Thailand was at first uncertain. "Every time I release a movie, I lose money because of the advertising and promotion, so I'm not sure if it's worth it, even though I would love to show it at home", Apichatpong said in an interview. On 25 June, however, Kick the Machine released it in a month-long run, limited to one theater in Bangkok, similar with the release of Weerasethakul's previous films. It passed uncut by the Thai censorship board, despite featuring scenes similar to those cut from the director's past two feature films. Distribution rights for the United States were acquired by Strand Releasing and the film received a U.S. release on 2 March 2011. Cartoonist Chris Ware created the poster for the U.S. release.

== Reception ==
Uncle Boonmee has received near universal acclaim from critics. On the review aggregator website Rotten Tomatoes, the film holds an 90% approval rating based on 103 reviews, with an average rating of 7.92/10. The site's critical consensus reads: "Languorous and deeply enigmatic, Palme d'Or winner Uncle Boonmee represents an original take on the ghosts that haunt us." On Metacritic the film has a weighted average score of 87 out of 100 based on 21 reviews, indicating "universal acclaim".

Sukhdev Sandhu of The Daily Telegraph gave the film a score of five out of five stars in an early festival review. Sandhu wrote: "It's barely a film; more a floating world. To watch it is to feel many things – balmed, seduced, amused, mystified," and continued: "There are many elements of this film that remain elusive and secretive. But that's a large part of its appeal: Weerasethakul, without ever trading in stock images of Oriental inscrutability, successfully conveys the subtle but important other-worldliness of this part of Thailand". In Screen International, Mark Adams called the film "a beautifully assembled affair, with certain scenes staged with painterly composure, and also increasingly moving as the subtle story develops. Plus Apichatpong Weerasethakul is not afraid of adding in moments of surreal humour – often laugh-out-loud moments for that – which helps the pacing of the film." Willis Wong of Intermedias Review called the film "a slow, meditative and often baffling journey visually gorgeous and worth taking."

Cahiers du Cinéma featured Uncle Boonmee Who Can Recall His Past Lives on the cover of the June 2010 issue and listed it first on their annual Top Ten of 2010.

The film received a score of 2.4/4 at the Screen International annual Cannes Jury Grid, which polls international film critics from publications such as Sight & Sound, The Australian, Positif, L'Unita and Der Tagesspiegel, among others. It was listed second on Film Comment's Best Films of 2011 list. In the 2012 Sight & Sound critics' poll, eight critics voted for it as one of their ten greatest films ever made; this ranked it at #202 in the finished list. Five directors also voted, making the film ranked at #132 in the directors' poll. In the 2022 critic's poll fifteen critics voted for the film, with it receiving place #196 in the ranking. In a 2016 BBC poll, critics voted the film the 37th greatest since 2000. In July 2025, it was one of the films voted for the "Readers' Choice" edition of The New York Times' list of "The 100 Best Movies of the 21st Century," finishing at number 259. That same month, it ranked number 32 on Rolling Stone's list of "The 100 Best Movies of the 21st Century."

=== Accolades ===
The film won the Palme d'Or at the 2010 Cannes Film Festival. It became the first Asian film to win the award since 1997. Apichatpong Weerasethakul became the first Thai director to receive the award. The film was selected as the Thai entry for the Best Foreign Language Film at the 83rd Academy Awards but it did not make the final shortlist.

Award	Date of ceremony	Category	Recipient(s)	Result	Ref(s)
Asian Film Awards	21 March 2011	Best Film	Apichatpong Weerasethakul	Won	
Cannes Film Festival	12–23 May 2010	Palme d'Or	Apichatpong Weerasethakul	Won	
Chicago Film Critics Association	19 December 2011	Best Foreign Language Film	Apichatpong Weerasethakul	Nominated	
Chicago International Film Festival	6–20 October 2011	International Film Poster Silver Plaque	Chris Ware	Won	
Dubai International Film Festival	12–19 December 2010	Best Cinematographer	Sayombhu Mukdeeprom and Yukontorn Mingmongkon	Won	
Independent Spirit Awards	26 February 2011	Best Foreign Language Film	Apichatpong Weerasethakul	Nominated	
London Film Critics' Circle	11 February 2011	Best Foreign Language Film	Apichatpong Weerasethakul	Nominated	
London Film Critics' Circle	11 February 2011	Best Director	Apichatpong Weerasethakul	Nominated	
Online Film Critics Society	2 January 2012	Best Foreign Language Film	Apichatpong Weerasethakul	Nominated	
Toronto Film Critics Association	14 December 2010	Best Picture	Apichatpong Weerasethakul	Runner-up	
Toronto Film Critics Association	14 December 2010	Best Foreign Language Film	Apichatpong Weerasethakul	Won	

== See also ==
- List of submissions to the 83rd Academy Awards for Best Foreign Language Film
- List of Thai submissions for the Academy Award for Best Foreign Language Film
