= Pál Adrienn =

2010 film

- Film poster
- Directed by: Ágnes Kocsis
- Written by: Ágnes Kocsis; Andrea Roberti
- Produced by: Jean Bréhat
- Starring: Éva Gábor
- Cinematography: Ádám Fillenz
- Edited by: Tamás Kollányi
- Release dates: 16 May 2010 (Cannes); 17 March 2011 (Hungary)
- Running time: 136 minutes
- Country: Hungary
- Language: Hungarian

Pál Adrienn is a 2010 Hungarian drama film directed by Ágnes Kocsis. It was screened in the Un Certain Regard section at the 2010 Cannes Film Festival.

== Cast ==
- Éva Gábor
- István Znamenák
- Ákos Horváth
- Lia Pokorny
- Izabella Hegyi

== Awards ==
- 63rd Cannes Film Festival, Un Certain Regard – FIPRESCI Award
- Sarajevo Film Festival – Cinelink: Magic Box Award for the screenplay (2007)
- Jameson Cinefest International Film Festival, Miskolc, Hungary - Film Critics Award
- Arsenals Int. Film Festival, Riga, Latvia - Condamnation of the Interfilm Jury
- Zurich Film Festival – Critics Choice Award
- Cinepécs - Hungary - Film New Europe Visegrád Award
- 2in1 Festival, Moscow – “Prize for the Best Hero(ine)” for the best performance to Éva Gábor
- Manaki Brothers International Cinematographers' Film Festival, Bitola -Award for exceptional artistic achievement in the art of cinematography
- Cottbus Film Festival – Prize for the Best Director
- Cottbus Film Festival –Prize for an Outstanding actress to Éva Gábor
- Cottbus Film Festival – Prize of the Ecumenical Jury
- The Hungarian Film Critics’ Award for the best director of the year
- The Hungarian Film Critics’ Award for the best cinematography of the year
