= Vega brothers =

- Born: Daniel Vega Vidal; 1973 (age 52–53); Lima, Peru Diego Vega Vidal; 1974 (age 51–52); Lima, Peru
- Occupations: Film directors; film producers; screenwriters
- Years active: 2008–present
- Notable work: October; El mudo
- Children: Daniel: 1

Daniel Vega Vidal (born 1973) and Diego Vega Vidal (born 1974), collectively known as the Vega brothers, are a Peruvian filmmaking duo. They are known for directing, writing and producing the black comedy-drama film October, which won the Un Certain Regard Jury Prize at the 2010 Cannes Film Festival.

== Filmography ==
=== Short film ===
| Year | Title | Director | Writer | Notes |
|---|---|---|---|---|
| 2008 | Interior bajo izquierda | Yes | Yes | |
| 2015 | Alondra | Yes | Yes | Segment of The Empty Classroom |
| 2023 | Dona y César | Yes | Yes | |

Daniel only

| Year | Title | Director | Writer |
|---|---|---|---|
| 2025 | Juguete | Yes | No |

=== Feature film ===
| Year | Title | Director | Writer | Producer |
|---|---|---|---|---|
| 2010 | October | Yes | Yes | Yes |
| 2013 | El mudo | Yes | Yes | Yes |
| 2016 | Guerrero | No | Yes | No |
| 2019 | The Clash | Yes | Yes | Yes |
| 2024 | Reinas | No | Diego | Daniel |

Daniel only

| Year | Title | Director | Producer |
|---|---|---|---|
| 2019 | Exchanged | Yes | No |
| 2022 | Where's the Right Girl | Yes | No |
| 2025 | All the Strength | No | Yes |

Diego only

| Year | Title | Writer |
|---|---|---|
| 2009 | The Prize | Yes |
| 2011 | Operation Victoria: The Fall of Shining Path | Yes |

=== Television ===
| Year | Title | Episode |
|---|---|---|
| 2017-2018 | El Chapo | 5 episodes |
| 2018 | Matar al padre | 4 episodes; writer (Diego only) |
| 2019 | El día de mi suerte | 4 episodes; co-creator (Diego only), director, writer |
| 2022 | The Fight for Justice: Paolo Guerrero | 6 episodes; director (Daniel only), writer (Diego only) |
