= Exchanged (film) =

- Theatrical release poster
- Directed by: Daniel Vega
- Written by: María José Osorio
- Produced by: Jorge Constantino; Diego Vives
- Starring: Patricia Portocarrero; Johanna San Miguel
- Cinematography: Roberto Maceda Kohatsu
- Edited by: Renato Constantino
- Music by: Jorge "Awelo" Miranda
- Production company: Tondero Producciones
- Distributed by: Tondero Producciones
- Release date: April 4, 2019
- Running time: 95 minutes
- Country: Peru
- Language: Spanish

Exchanged (Spanish: Intercambiadas) is a 2019 Peruvian fantasy comedy film directed by Daniel Vega and written by María José Osorio. It stars Patricia Portocarrero and Johanna San Miguel. It premiered on April 4, 2019, in Peruvian theaters.

== Synopsis ==
Little Vasco, Paola's son, makes a wish on a shooting star that will turn everything upside down: they both wake up in each other's bodies, giving rise to hilarious and funny situations while looking for a solution to their unique problem.

== Cast ==
The actors participating in this film are:

- Patricia Portocarrero as Guadalupe/Paola in her body
- Johanna San Miguel as Paola/Guadalupe in her body
- Matías Raygada as Vasco
- Bruno Odar as Ricardo
- Karime Scander as Chiara
- Bernardo Scerpella as David
- Guillermo Blanco as Mateo
- Liliana Trujillo as Charo

== Production ==
The filming of the film lasted three and a half weeks, in different locations in Lima such as a house in Barranco, Casino of the National Police of Peru, a house in San Martín square, San Luis school and buildings in downtown Lima.

== Reception ==
The film in its passage through theaters attracted 168,170 viewers
