= Guerrero (film) =

- Theatrical release poster
- Directed by: Fernando Villarán
- Written by: Daniel Vega Vidal; Diego Vega Vidal
- Production company: Tondero Producciones
- Release date: December 8, 2016
- Running time: 90 minutes
- Country: Peru
- Language: Spanish

Guerrero is a 2016 Peruvian biographical drama film directed by Fernando Villarán and written by Daniel & Diego Vega Vidal. It tells the story of soccer player Paolo Guerrero. The film was released in theaters on December 8, 2016 in Peru.

== Synopsis ==
The film is a biopic that focuses on the figure of Peruvian soccer player Paolo Guerrero, from his humble childhood when he practiced soccer in his neighborhood to his international success and fame as the top scorer of the Peru national football team in 2016. Rony Shapiama, a 10-year-old actor, plays Guerrero as a child, while Paolo himself plays himself as an adult.

== Cast ==
- Rony Shapiama as Paolo Guerrero as a child.
- Paolo Guerrero as himself
- Magdyel Ugaz as Peta Gonzales
- Paul Vega as José Guerrero
- Lucho Cáceres as Guerrero's first coach
- Javier Valdés as Constantino Carvallo
- Rosa Guzman, as Guerrero's grandmother
