= El mudo (film) =

2013 film

- Film poster
- Directed by: Daniel Vega Vidal; Diego Vega Vidal
- Written by: Manuel Arias; Diego Vega; Daniel Vega
- Starring: Fernando Bacilio
- Cinematography: Fergan Chávez-Ferrer
- Release date: 8 August 2013 (Locarno IFF)
- Running time: 86 minutes
- Countries: Peru; France; Mexico
- Language: Spanish

El mudo is a 2013 black comedy-drama film co-written and directed by Diego Vega and Daniel Vega. It was screened in the Contemporary World Cinema section at the 2013 Toronto International Film Festival.

== Cast ==
- Fernando Bacilio
- Lidia Rodríguez
- Juan Luis Maldonado
- Augusto Varillas
- José Luis Gómez
- Norka Ramírez
- Ernesto Ráez
