= Paolo Guerrero =

Peruvian footballer (born 1984)

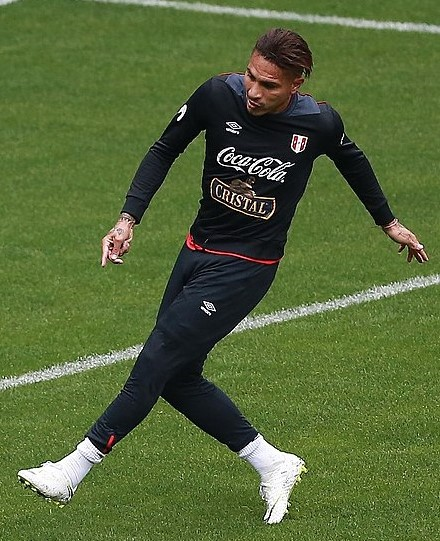
- Guerrero training with Peru at the 2018 FIFA World Cup

Personal information
- Full name: José Paolo Guerrero González
- Date of birth: 1 January 1984 (age 42)
- Place of birth: Lima, Peru
- Height: 1.85 m (6 ft 1 in)
- Position: Striker

Team information
- Current team: Alianza Lima
- Number: 34

Youth career
- 1992–2002: Alianza Lima
- 2002–2003: Bayern Munich

Senior career*
Years	Team	Apps	(Gls)
2002–2006	Bayern Munich II	66	(45)
2004–2006	Bayern Munich	27	(10)
2006–2012	Hamburger SV	134	(37)
2012–2015	Corinthians	102	(38)
2015–2018	Flamengo	85	(34)
2018–2021	Internacional	51	(20)
2022–2023	Avaí	10	(0)
2023	Racing Club	15	(1)
2023–2024	LDU Quito	13	(5)
2024	Universidad César Vallejo	6	(3)
2024–	Alianza Lima	52	(24)

International career^{‡}
2000–2001	Peru U17	20	(9)
2004	Peru U23	4	(3)
2004–2025	Peru	128	(40)
Medal record
Men's football
Representing Peru
Copa América
Runner-up	2019 Brazil
Third place	2011 Argentina
Third place	2015 Chile
Bolivarian Games
Gold medal – first place	2001 Ambato	Team
- * Club domestic league appearances and goals as of 21 November 2026 ‡ National team caps and goals as of 10 June 2025

José Paolo Guerrero González (Spanish pronunciation: [xoˈse paˈolo ɣeˈreɾo ɣonˈsales]; born 1 January 1984) is a Peruvian professional footballer who plays as a striker for Liga 1 club Alianza Lima and the Peru national team. Known as one of the best Peruvian and South American strikers of his time, he was key to Peru's successes in the 2000s through 2010s, giving him the nickname, el Depredador (the Predator).

"A legend in South American football" for the New York Times, he has been Peru's most important football player for two decades. Forging his career in Germany, Guerrero started at giants Bayern Munich, before making his name at Hamburger SV, scoring 47 goals across eight Bundesliga seasons. His greatest successes came in Brazil, where he scored the winning goal of the 2012 FIFA Club World Cup final for Corinthians.

With 40 goals in 128 matches for Peru since debuting at 20, Guerrero holds the honour of being the highest goalscorer for his national team. He has represented them at six Copas América and one World Cup. He led them to third place in the 2011 and 2015 Copas, and to runners-up in 2019, finishing as top scorer in all three of these tournaments. He is also the top scoring active player in the Copa América. He was one of 59 nominees for the 2015 FIFA Ballon d'Or, becoming the first Peruvian to receive that recognition. He's also the oldest Peruvian player to appear in a World Cup, at the age of 34 years and 177 days.

In 2021, the IFFHS included Guerrero in their best South American team of the last decade, being recognized as the best South American center forward between 2010 and 2020 (joining the podium with Neymar and Sergio Agüero). In addition, he was voted the "best centre forward in America" in 2012 and 2017 by the newspaper El País, based on the opinion of some two hundred journalists from the region. He has also been named included by CONMEBOL in the teams of the tournament for the 2011, 2015 and 2019 Copas América.

== Club career ==
=== Early career ===
Guerrero was born in Lima, starting his football career in the youth teams of Alianza Lima. In 2003, he signed a contract with Bavarian giants Bayern Munich. During the 2003–04 season, Guerrero played in the Regionalliga Süd where he scored 21 goals in 23 games. During the 2004–05 season, he joined fellow countryman Claudio Pizarro as a member of the Bayern first team.

=== Bayern Munich ===
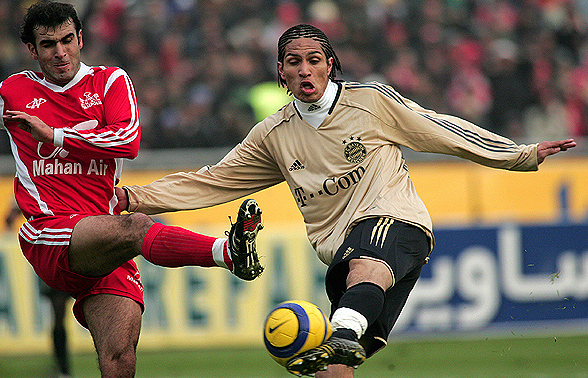
Guerrero (right) playing for Bayern Munich in 2006

At the beginning of 2002, after rejecting an offer from K.R.C. Genk of Belgium, Bayern Munich of Germany announced his incorporation to the second team. This signing led to a conflict between Alianza Lima and Bayern. The case was raised to FIFA, which decided that the German club should pay for training rights since, although Guerrero had a formal contract with Alianza, it was not of a professional nature. Once the problem was solved, Guerrero began playing with Bayern Munich II in the Regionalliga South, which at that time was the third division of German football. On May 30, 2004 he was crowned champion in this category.

At the team level, he played his first game with the Bayern professional team on October 23, 2004 against Hansa Rostock.with the number "33", while his first goal in the Bundesliga was scored against Hannover 96. In total, Guerrero spent four seasons at Bayern Munich, alternating the last two in the first team, the same team with which he scored ten goals in the Bundesliga and two in the UEFA Champions League.

In June 2006 he left Bayern Munich. His destination was Hamburger SV, a club with which he signed a four-year contract.

=== Hamburger SV ===
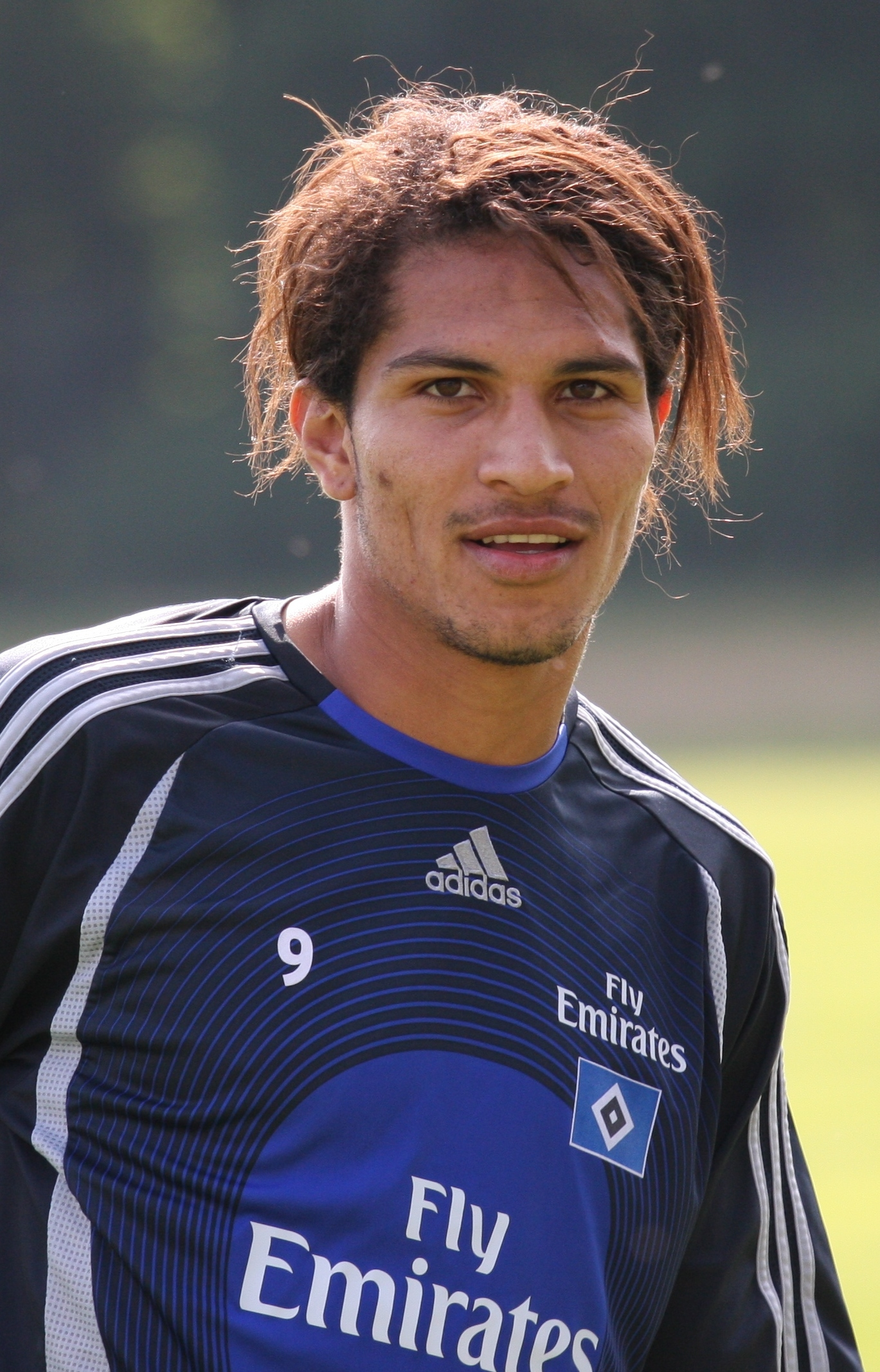
Guerrero with Hamburger SV in 2008

In June 2006, it was announced that Guerrero had transferred to Hamburger SV and signed a contract with the club through 2010. His first season was marred by an injury, which took away half his season, and his low productivity, being a substitute most of the season. Near the end, he did score three goals, making his season total 5 goals in 20 games. One of these goals was against former club Bayern Munich in a 1–2 victory which left Bayern with no possibilities of making it to the UEFA Champions League. In the 2007–08 season, his second at Hamburg, Guerrero played 29 of 34 games in the Bundesliga, scoring nine goals and getting four assists, as well as becoming an undisputed starter and a vital part of the side; he was the third top scorer, behind Rafael van der Vaart (12 goals) and Ivica Olić (14 goals). In the UEFA Cup and qualification, he played nine games, scoring five goals and getting three assists. His first hat-trick in his professional career was against Karlsruher SC, in the last game of the Bundesliga, scoring the second, third, and fourth goals in a 7–0 victory. This victory secured them fourth place and a UEFA Cup spot for next season.

By the beginning of the 2008–09 season, Guerrero had become first choice striker for Hamburger SV. Coach Martin Jol even went as far as saying that Guerrero better not catch even a cold during the season. Guerrero was fined a club record (somewhere in the region of €50,000–100,000), in April 2010 for an incident at the end of a league game with Hannover 96, where after apparently having been abused by a Hamburg fan, Guerrero threw his drink bottle into the crowd, striking that fan in the face. The German Football Association (DFB) suspended Guerrero for five league games and fined him €20,000.

=== Corinthians ===
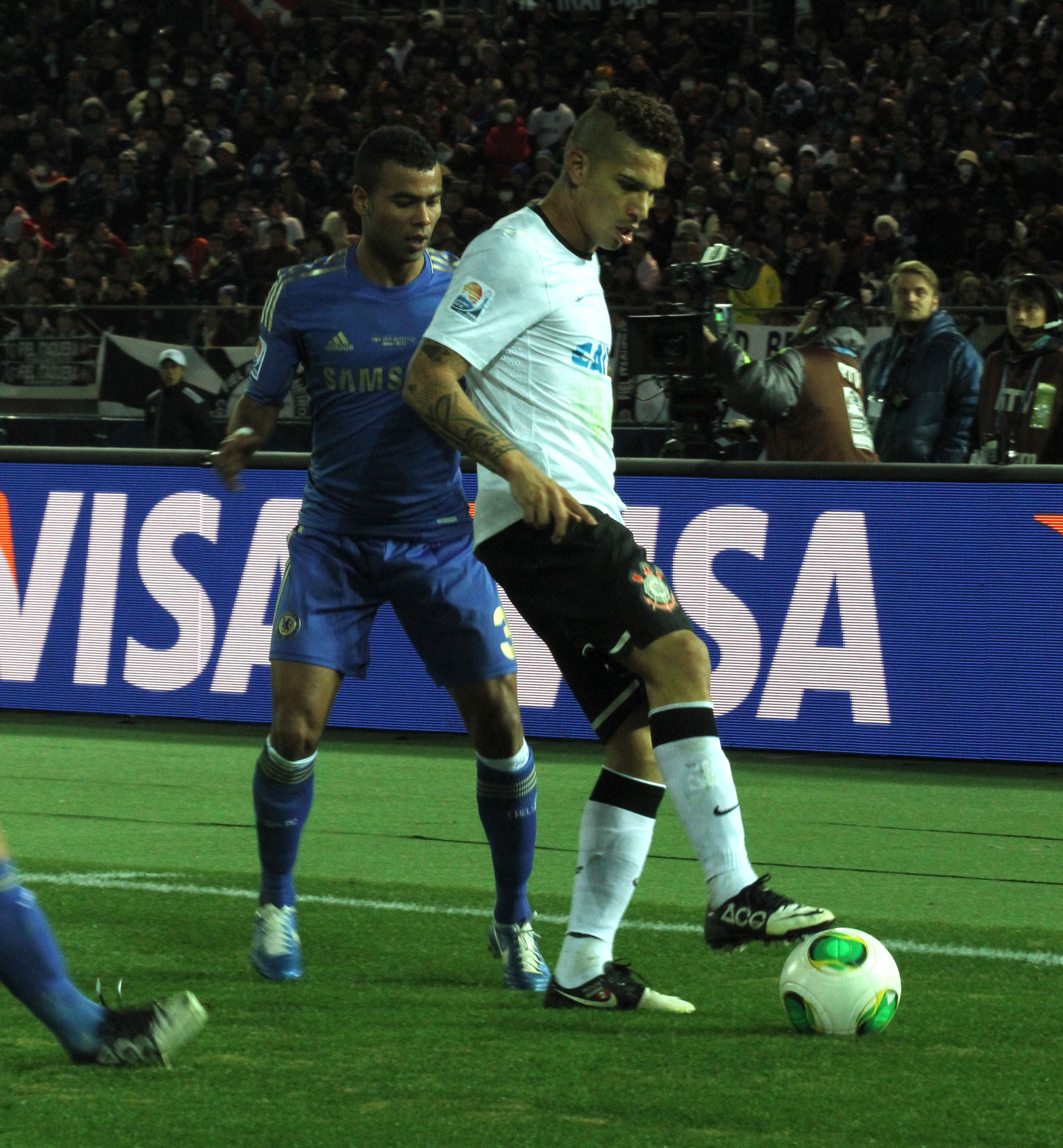
Guerrero with Corinthians in 2012

Guerrero joined Brazilian club Corinthians on 13 July 2012, on a three-year deal for a fee of R$7.5 million. On 25 July 2012, he made his debut in a match against Cruzeiro in the 2012 Brasileiro Série A, where Corinthians won 2–0. His debut in the "Timao" attracted the immediate attention of the Peruvian media to São Paulo. In the 26th round of the Brasileiro, he played against Botafogo and scored his first goal for his team. Guerrero grew in the later rounds of the Brazilian championship, scoring several goals that secured his place in the team's starting lineup.

On November 27, 2012, days before embarking to Japan to compete in the 2012 FIFA Club World Cup, the athlete was honored by the Peruvian consulate in Brazil "in recognition of his sporting merits and professionalism, showing all the high values of Peruvian sport in Brazil and being considered as a starter in most of the matches played." It was at the FIFA Club World Cup where Guerrero would make his most historic performance with Corinthians. On December 12, 2012, in the semifinals of the tournament against Al Ahly of Egypt, Guerrero scored the only goal of the match with a header that took Corinthians to the final. On 16 December 2012, in the Club World Cup final against 2011–12 UEFA Champions League winners Chelsea, Guerrero scored, again with a header, to give Corinthians the title of World Champions at club level. Paolo Guerrero was awarded the Bronze Ball as the third top goalscorer of the tournament.

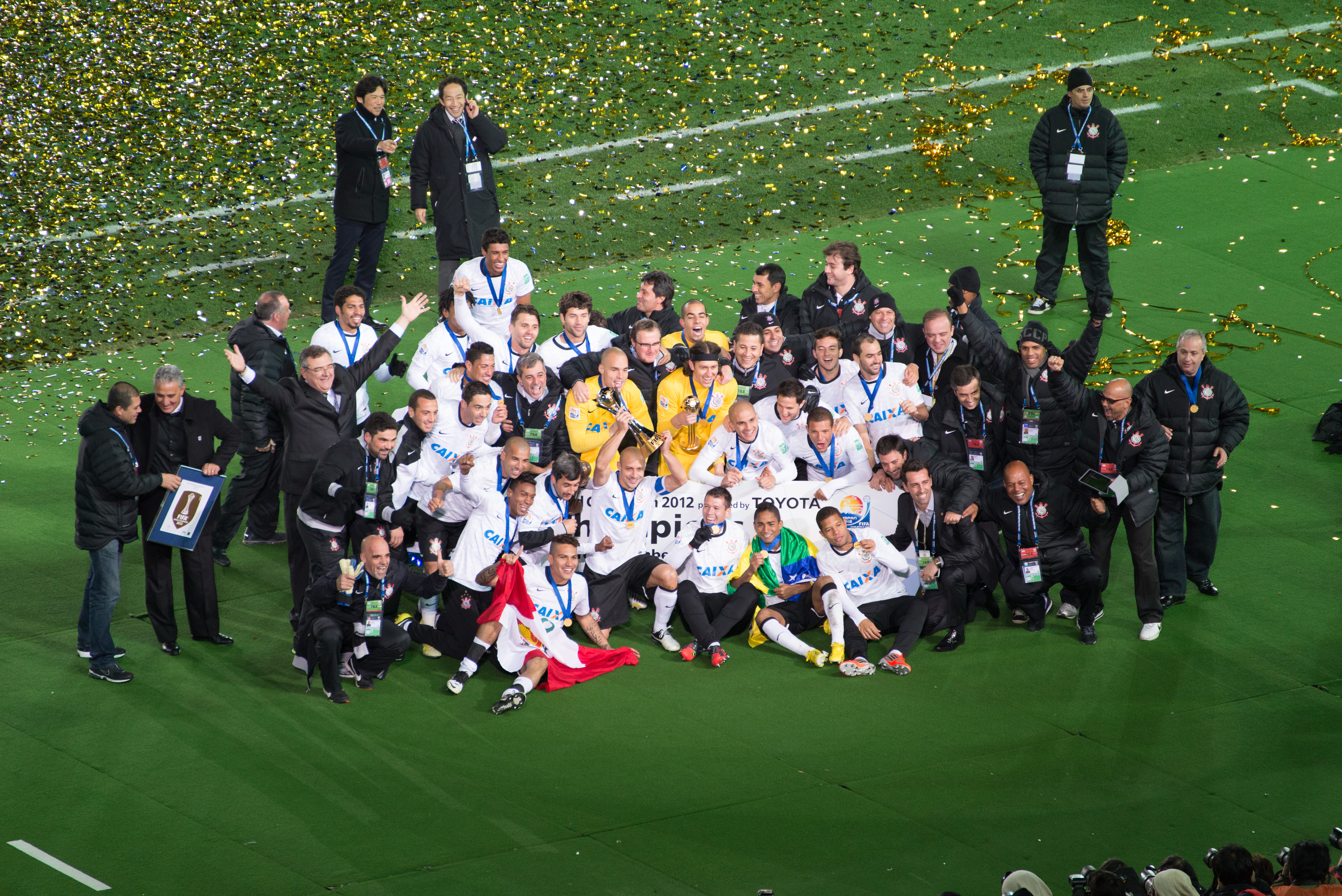
Guerrero with Corinthians, celebrating their FIFA Club World Cup win

In May 2013, Guerrero became the first Peruvian footballer to appear on the cover of Placar, Brazil's biggest football magazine. The cover featured him as a warrior ("guerrero" is similar to the Portuguese word "guerreiro", both meaning "warrior") fresh out of battle, with blood on his legs, and carrying a Corinthians flag.

In July 2013, Corinthians won the 2013 Recopa Sudamericana, defeating city rivals São Paulo FC 4–1 on aggregate. Guerrero scored in the first leg, a 2–1 away win. At the end of the year, Guerrero ended up consecrated as his team's top scorer in the season by scoring 18 goals in 46 games and winning 2 titles. He was awarded as the best striker of the Brasileirao in the 2014 season.

On March 17, 2015, Guerrero became the foreign player who scored the most goals for Corinthians, with 47 goals, surpassing Argentina's Carlos Tevez who scored 46 goals. The record was obtained in a match against the Uruguayan club Danubio F.C. for the third round of the second phase of the 2015 Copa Libertadores. In that match he was the great figure by scoring his first hat trick with Corinthians, the match ended 4–0 in favor of Coringao. Guerrero became the top scorer of the post-relegation era, breaking the record that previously belonged to Dentinho.

In 2015, Guerrero and Corinthians were not able to reach a deal on the renegotiation of his contract, due to end on 15 July. Corinthians fans asked for his permanence and subsequent retirement at the club, since they considered him an idol and his contract ended in the middle of the year. But after being eliminated by Guaraní from the Copa Libertadores, finally, in June it was confirmed that Paolo would no longer continue in Corinthians for not reaching an economic agreement for his renewal. His last game for Corinthians was against Fluminense on 24 May. Corinthians confirmed his release three days later.

=== Flamengo ===
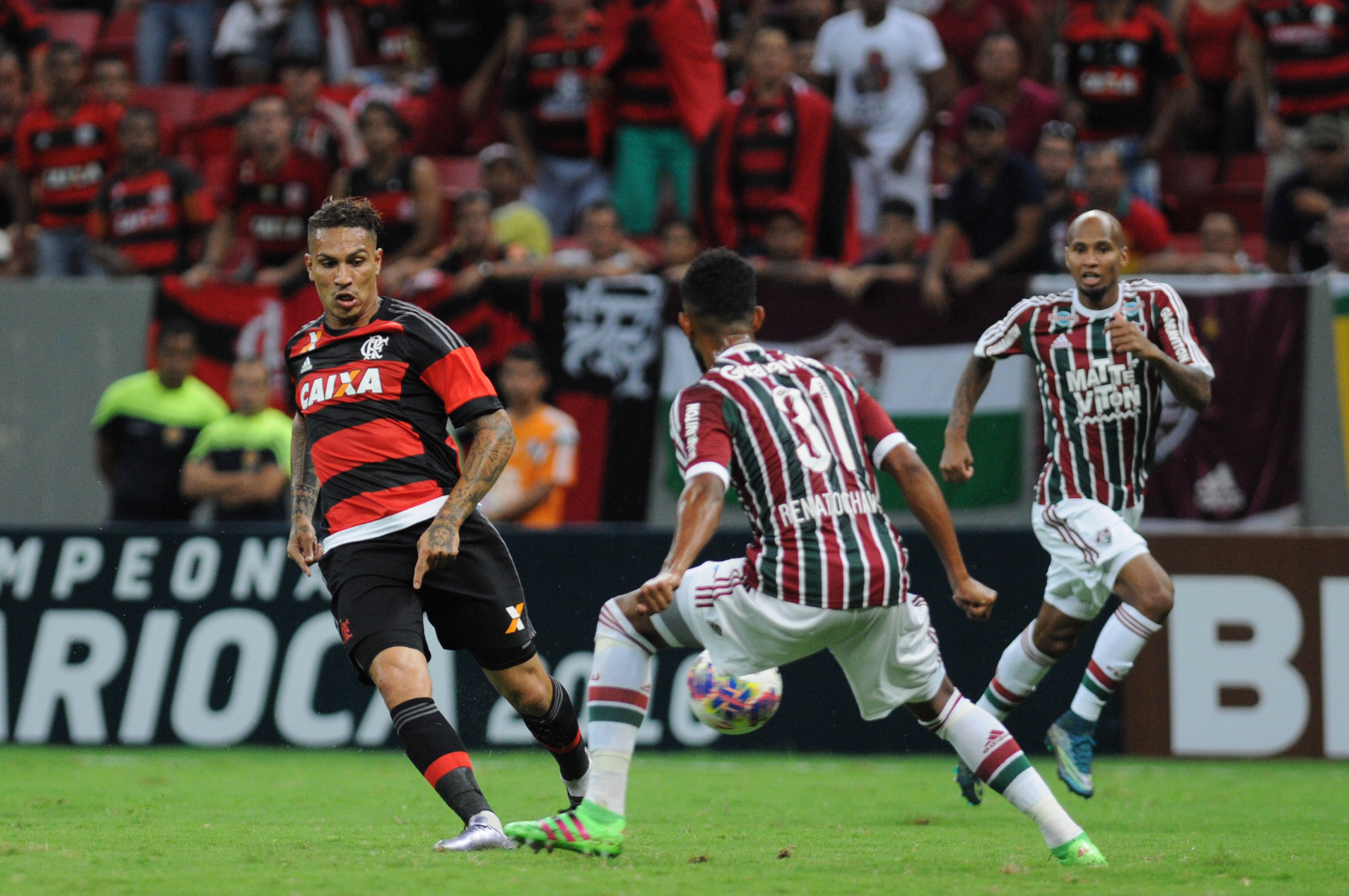
Guerrero playing for Flamengo in 2016

It was announced on 29 May 2015, that Guerrero would join Flamengo after performing well for Peru at the 2015 Copa América in Chile, where Peru achieved Third place. He traveled to Rio de Janeiro just one day after returning in Peru from the tournament. On 9 July 2015, having trained only one morning with the 'Mengão', he debuts in the evening against Internacional, scoring a goal and providing an assist for a goal, sentenced a streak of 5 goals in less than 2 weeks, with which he would win the admiration of the Carioca fans, who created the anthem 'Acabou o caô. O Guerrero chegou' in his honor.

Guerrero started 2017 season by scoring a brace at the Taça Guanabara, scoring the first and third goals in Flamengo's 4–1 win over Boavista on the first date of the group stage of the tournament, his compatriot Miguel Trauco would also be present to score Mengao's second goal. In the final, Flamengo lost to Fluminense.

In the 2017 Campeonato Carioca, Guerrero scored both of Flamengo's goals in a 2–1 semi-final win over Botafogo leading Flamengo to the final. In the final, Guerrero scored a goal for Flamengo's temporary 1–1 against Fluminense. In extra time, Rodinei would score the winning goal for Flamengo to be crowned champion of the tournament, this would be the first title that Guerrero won since his arrival at the club. Paolo Guerrero was consecrated as the top scorer with 10 in 11 games goals and was distinguished as the best player of the tournament being included in the ideal 11.

After his suspension for testing positive in anti-doping control, he returns to the field on 7 May 2018 in a match against Internacional which ended in a 2–0 victory. However, on May 13 he scored his first goal of the season against Chapecoense after a drought of 7 games without scoring, the CAS increased his suspension, which would mean he would miss the rest of the season until his return on July 18 against São Paulo. During his suspension in 2017, Flamengo lost the 2017 Copa Sudamericana final, with his suspension contributing to the loss. Although he was greeted with enthusiasm, he has not scored since his second return. This complicated his chances of renewing, since sectors of the fans were very dissatisfied with his performance on the field and even off it. Finally, when his contract expired, he signed for Internacional.

=== Internacional ===
On 12 August 2018, Guerrero signed with S.C. Internacional on a three-year contract, after leaving Flamengo on a free transfer. He was given the number 79, to commemorate the last time Inter won the Campeonato Brasileiro. However, days before he was to debut, on 24 August, his FIFA ban was upheld, preventing him from playing his first match until April 2019.

In 2019, Guerrero's number changed from 79 to 9, due to the departure of Leandro Damião. After his ban expired, Guerrero finally made his debut for Inter in the Campeonato Gaúcho against Caxias, on 6 April, scoring in the 2–0 semi-final win. His Copa Libertadores debut came against Palestino of Chile, a match where he scored twice. Guerrero ended the 2019 season as the teams top goalscorer, with 20 goals in 41 games.

In the midst of a goal drought of several weeks and rumors that he would be declared transferable, journalist Eduardo de Conto reported that Guerrero asked the board to terminate his contract to treat a knee injury. This was confirmed on 26 October 2021, when Inter released him on a "mutual agreement" to treat the alleged injury that had afflicted him since August last year.

=== Avaí ===
On 21 July 2022, Guerrero joined Brazilian Série A side Avaí for the remainder of the 2022 season. On 5 November 2022, Avaí got relegated to the Série B, being the first time team that Guerrero has played for that got relegated. Guerrero play 10 games with Avaí but did not score any goals.

=== Racing Club ===
On 24 January 2023, Guerrero signed for Argentine Primera División side Racing Club. He scored his first goal on 22 February in the 89th minute against San Martín de Formosa in a Copa Argentina match.

=== LDU Quito ===
On 14 July 2023, Guerrero signed for LDU Quito of Ecuador. On 3 August 2023, he made his debut away with LDU against Ñublense scoring the winning goal in the 60th minute of play, with the match ending 1-0 in favor of the Ecuadorian team. He would score again on 27 September against Defensa y Justicia in the first leg of the 2023 Copa Sudamericana semifinal. Finally, in this same tournament Guerrero with LDU managed to beat Fortaleza via penalties despite having missed the first penalty of their team. He thus became the first Peruvian in history to win the Copa Sudamericana with a foreign club. He scored 3 goals in 7 games.

He won the 2023 Ecuadorian Serie A scoring 5 goals in 15 games played, most of his goals were scored at the end of the tournament. He decided not to renew with the Ecuadorian club after learning that manager Zubeldía would not continue and ran the risk of not playing as a starter anymore.

=== Universidad César Vallejo ===
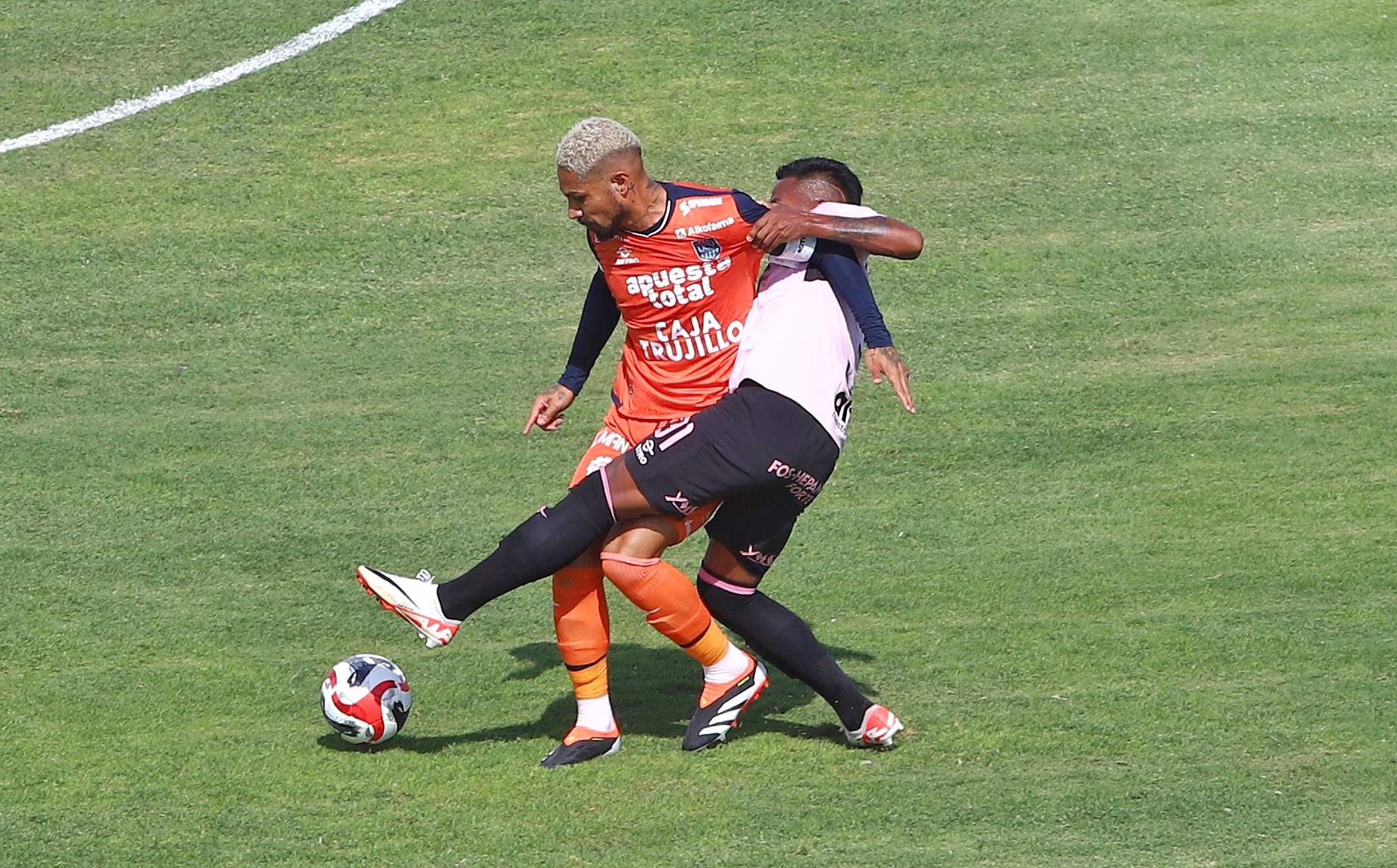
Guerrero playing for Universidad César Vallejo in 2024

In a controversial decision due to Guerrero's age, Roberto Mosquera would sign to play for Universidad César Vallejo for the 2024 Liga 1 on 2 February 2024. On his debut against Cusco FC, Paolo scored his first goal for the club in a 2–2 draw at home. Guerrero left the club after his mother was targeted for extortion by a local criminal gang. The separation was amicable with club president César Acuña promising the club would fulfil Guerrero's wish.

=== Alianza Lima ===
On 1 September 2024, Guerrero returned to Alianza Lima. He scored his first goal back at the club on 21 September 2024, against Sport Boys. On 22 April 2025, Guerrero became the oldest player to score two goals in the Copa Libertadores, scoring against Talleres, aged 41 years, 3 months and 21 days.

== International career ==
Guerrero's national career began at the 2001 Bolivarian Games where he won gold with the U-17 squad. His career with the senior team began in the unsuccessful 2006 FIFA World Cup qualification campaign, but he managed to score twice for the national side. His first goal was the winner against Chile in Lima's Estadio Nacional. It was followed by a first-minute goal in the next match against Ecuador at the same venue, though the Ecuadorians fought back to secure a 2–2 away draw. In the opening game of the 2007 Copa América in Mérida, Venezuela, Guerrero concluded a 3–0 win over Uruguay as Peru went on to reach the quarter-finals.

=== 2011 Copa América ===
Guerrero was ruled out of Peru's first two 2010 World Cup qualifying games because of injury. A further blow to Peru was laid down by FIFA when Guerrero was suspended six games for insulting the referee during the match against Uruguay in June 2008. Following Peru's disastrous qualifying campaign for the 2010 World Cup, José del Solar was replaced with Uruguayan manager Sergio Markarián and Guerrero was called up for the 2011 Copa América. In place of an injured Pizarro, Guerrero played as the team's starting striker in the competition and scored five times, making him the tournament's top scorer, one each against Uruguay and Mexico followed by a hat-trick against Venezuela in the third place play-off match which Peru won 4–1.

=== 2015 Copa América and Copa América Centenario ===
At the 2015 Copa América held in Chile, Guerrero scored a hat-trick in a 3–1 win against Bolivia in the quarter-final in Temuco. He scored the second goal in Peru's 2–0 win over Paraguay in the third place play-off, thus helping Peru to third place at the Copa América for a second consecutive time and finishing as joint top-goalscorer with Chile's Eduardo Vargas.

Guerrero became the all-time leading goalscorer for Peru on 4 June 2016, after scoring against Haiti in a 1–0 win at the Copa América Centenario.

=== Lead-up to the 2018 FIFA World Cup ===
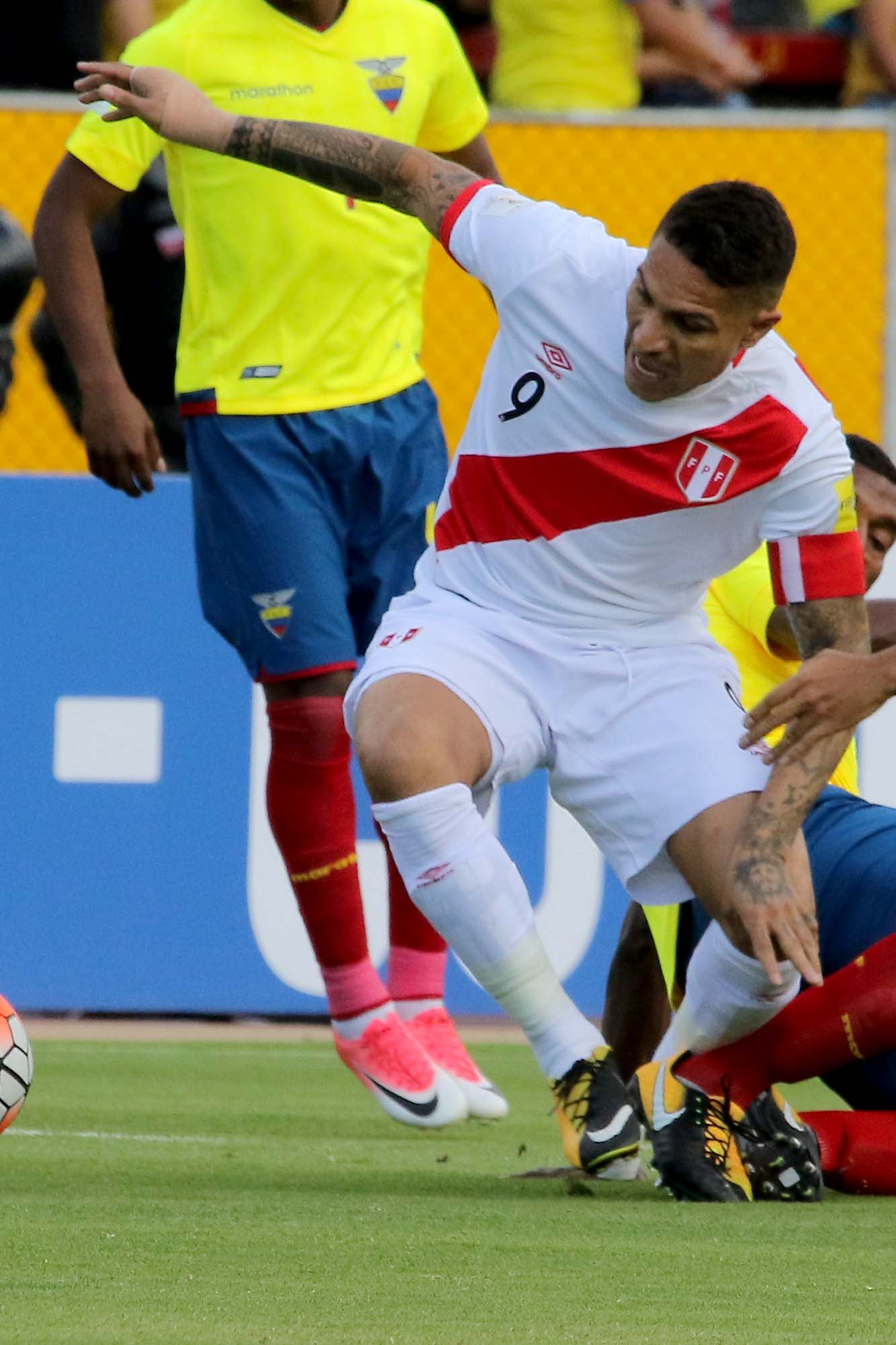
Guerrero with Peru in a 2018 FIFA World Cup qualifying match against Ecuador

Guerrero made 17 appearances and scored five goals in the 2018 FIFA World Cup qualifying campaign, leading the Peru team in their successful World Cup qualifying campaign. On 3 November 2017, it was announced that Guerrero had failed the doping control test after the match against Argentina in the previous month for what was initially reported as a social drug. He received a preemptive 30-day suspension from FIFA, making him miss the World Cup play-off tie against New Zealand, eventually won by Peru.

On 8 December 2017, it was revealed that Guerrero had tested positive for benzoylecgonine, the primary metabolite of cocaine. As a result, he was banned by FIFA from all competitions for one year, meaning that he would not have been able to participate in the 2018 FIFA World Cup. The ban was reduced on appeal 12 days later. Guerrero's lawyers had argued that the failed test had occurred as a result of the consumption of a traditional coca tea, using forensic analysis of the Children of Llullaillaco as evidence.

However, on 14 May 2018, the Court of Arbitration for Sport upheld the appeal filed by the World Anti-Doping Agency, extending the ban to 14 months and ruling him out of the tournament. It accepted that Guerrero did not intend to enhance performance but said he was at fault, even if not significantly. Captains of Peru's group-stage competitors, Hugo Lloris (France), Simon Kjaer (Denmark) and Mile Jedinak (Australia) supported Guerrero's appeal and released a letter urging FIFA to lift the ban.

On 31 May 2018, it was announced Guerrero would be allowed to play at the 2018 FIFA World Cup after the Swiss Federal Tribunal lifted the ban for the tournament.

On 3 June 2018, Guerrero made his comeback after a seven-month absence from the national team scoring twice in the 3–0 friendly win against Saudi Arabia.

A 2018 report of investigative journalists of German broadcasting station ARD revealed doping practices in Brazil, involving physician Mohamad Barakat who reportedly treated Guerrero and who had already posed with him many years ago.

=== 2018 FIFA World Cup ===
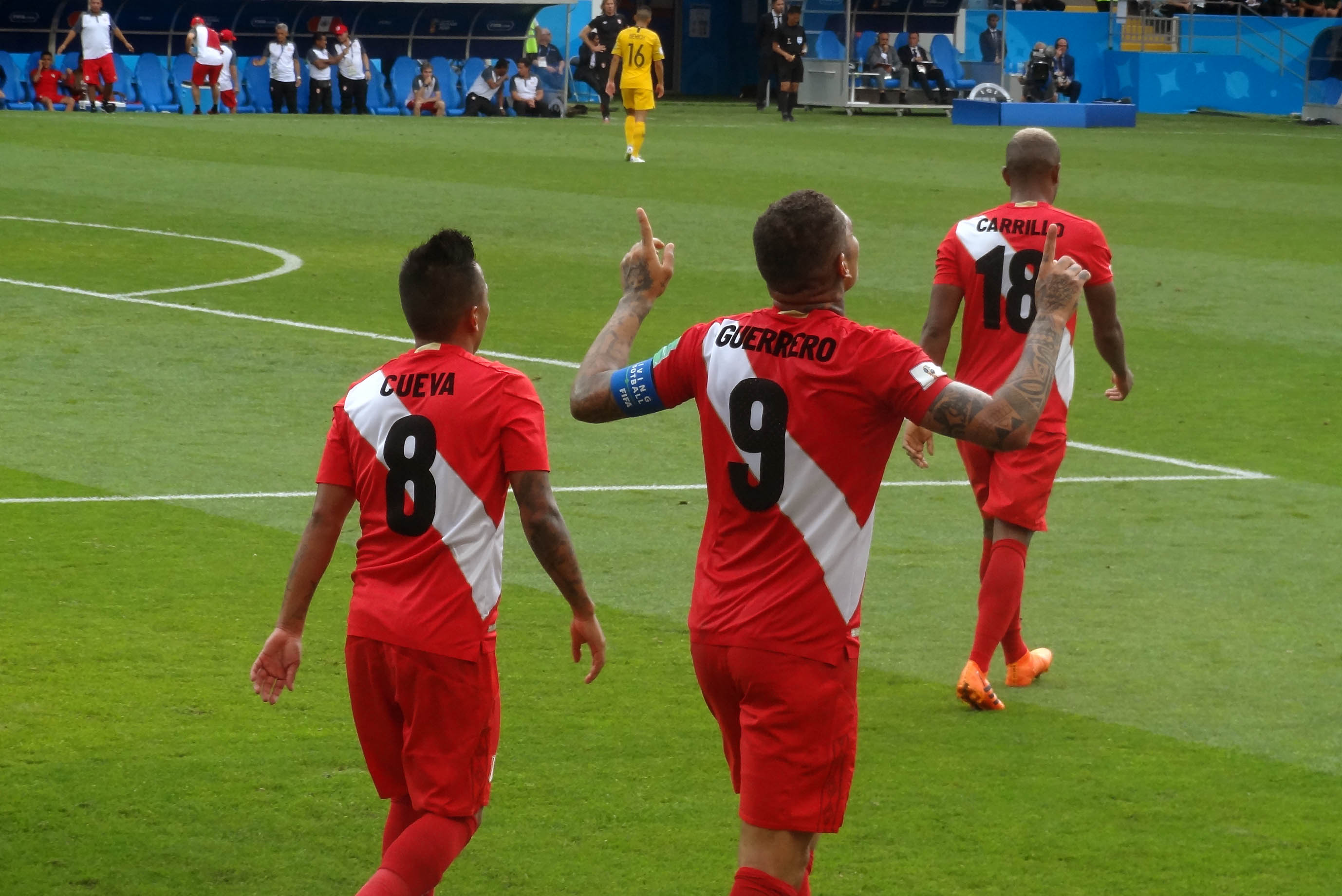
Guerrero celebrating his goal against Australia at the 2018 World Cup

Guerrero made his World Cup debut on 16 June 2018, coming off the bench in the 1–0 loss to Denmark. On 26 June, he assisted André Carrillo's goal, which was Peru's first World Cup goal in 36 years, and scored the second goal in Peru's 2–0 win over Australia, in the team's final group match, as his side suffered a first-round exit from the competition. At the age of 34 and 177 days, he became the oldest Peruvian player to appear in a FIFA World Cup.

=== 2019 Copa América ===
In May 2019, Guerrero was included in Ricardo Gareca's final 23-man squad for the 2019 Copa América in Brazil. He scored the opening goal in Peru's second group game of the tournament on 18 June – a 3–1 victory over Bolivia. In the semi-finals against defending champions Chile on 3 July, Guerrero scored the final goal of a 3–0 win, which saw Peru advance to the final of the tournament for the first time since 1975.

In the 2019 Copa América Final against hosts Brazil on 7 July, at the Maracanã Stadium, Guerrero scored the temporary equaliser from the penalty spot in the first half; the match eventually ended in a 3–1 victory to Brazil. Guerrero finished the tournament as the top scorer with 3 goals, alongside Brazil's Everton Soares, who won the Golden Boot Award due to having played fewer minutes than the Peruvian throughout the tournament.

=== Late career ===
On 11 October 2019, Guerrero made his 100th international appearance for Peru in a friendly match against Uruguay. Failing to appear in a single match for Peru in 2020, he finally made his return to the international scene in June 2021, playing two 2022 World Cup qualifiers against Colombia and Ecuador. However, he was excluded from the squad for the 2021 Copa América by coach Ricardo Gareca, who deemed him to not yet be in good enough shape to be useful to team, following an injury that had laid him off for seven months. He then failed to appear in a single match for Peru in 2022, including that year's world cup, making his return to the international scene in June 2023, in a friendly against South Korea.

On 26 March 2024, Guerrero scored a stoppage time penalty to seal a 4–1 win in a friendly against Dominican Republic, becoming, at the age of 40 years and 86 days, the oldest-ever goalscorer in the history of the Peruvian national team, breaking a 63-year-old record set by Faustino Delgado in 1961 by just 7 days. By overtaking Delgado, he also became the oldest-ever goalscorer in CONMEBOL. Later that year, he was a member of the Peru team that competed in the 2024 Copa América, becoming the third Peruvian player to participate in six tournaments, only after Lolo Fernández and Chemo del Solar.

Guerrero announced his retirement from international football on 7 January 2025, with 124 appearances and 39 goals scored. Two months later, however, on 9 March 2025, he came out of retirement by accepting a call back from the new Peruvian coach Óscar Ibáñez for the upcoming qualifiers against Bolivia and Venezuela, scoring his 40th international goal in a 3–1 victory vs Bolivia at the age of 41 years and 78 days, becoming the oldest player to ever score in the World Cup South American qualifiers, surpassing Gabriel González's record from 2000, aged 39 years and 168 days. He also became the second-oldest goalscorer in any World Cup qualifier, behind only Keithroy Cornelius, who scored for the Virgin Islands at the age of 43 years in 2011.

== Sponsorship ==
Paolo Guerrero has a global partnership with Betsson and is their exclusive Global Casino Ambassador to "further strengthen Betsson’s presence in Latin America and solidifying Betsson as the most exciting brand in the industry."

== Personal life ==
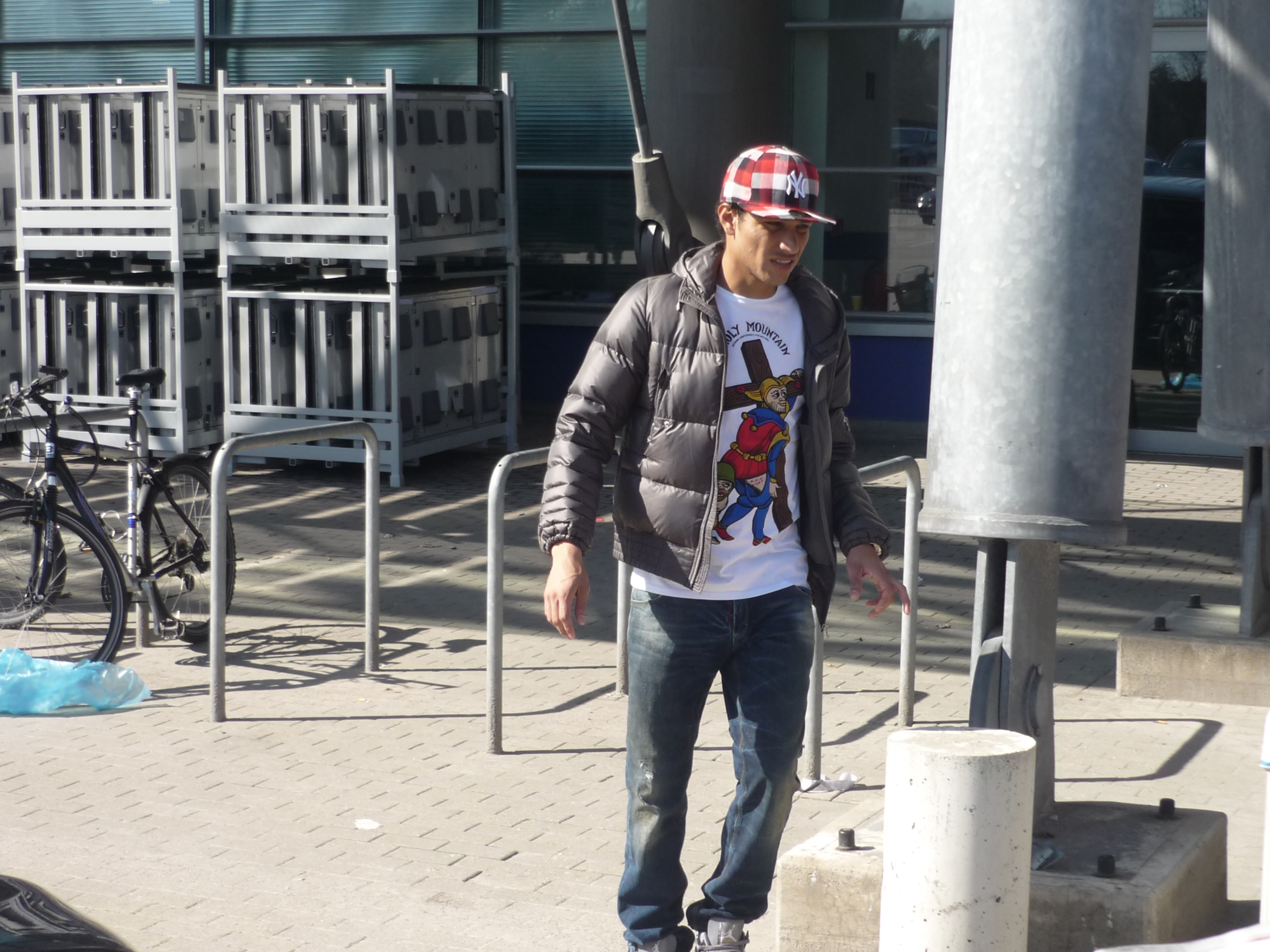
Guerrero in 2010

Guerrero has a fear of flying. Media reports claim his fear of flying is due to the death of his uncle José González Ganoza in the 1987 Alianza Lima air disaster.

Guerrero's older brother, Julio Rivera, was also a footballer for the Peru national team who progressed through the Alianza Lima youth system. The brothers were both following in the path of their uncle who had represented Alianza Lima and the Peru national team before them.

Guerrero is Roman Catholic.

His nephew, also named Julio Rivera, was found dead from a robbery in Lima in 2019. Guerrero held his death with sorrow and honor to his late nephew. In 2024, his mother was targeted for extortion by gangs.

In 2016, the film Guerrero was released, featuring Paolo Guerrero and the story of his rise to success. On 5 October 2022, Netflix released Paolo Guerrero's series, Contigo capitán (The Fight for Justice: Paolo Guerrero in English), showing the story of Guerrero's false doping leading up to the 2018 FIFA World Cup.

== Career statistics ==
=== Club ===
As of match played 21 November 2026

Appearances and goals by club, season and competition
Club	Season	League			State league (Note: Includes Campeonato Paulista, Campeonato Carioca, Campeonato Gaúcho)		National cup (Note: Includes DFB-Pokal, Copa do Brasil, Copa Argentina)		Continental		Other		Total	
Club	Season	Division	Apps	Goals	Apps	Goals	Apps	Goals	Apps	Goals	Apps	Goals	Apps	Goals
Bayern Munich II	2002–03	Regionalliga	18	8	—		—		—		—		18	8
Bayern Munich II	2003–04	Regionalliga	24	21	—		—		—		—		24	21
Bayern Munich II	2004–05	Regionalliga	11	7	—		—		—		—		11	7
Bayern Munich II	2005–06	Regionalliga	13	9	—		—		—		—		13	9
Bayern Munich II	Total		66	45	—		—		—		—		66	45
Bayern Munich	2004–05	Bundesliga	13	6	—		4	4	6 (Note: Appearances in UEFA Champions League)	1	—		23	11
Bayern Munich	2005–06	Bundesliga	14	4	—		3	1	7	1	—		24	6
Bayern Munich	Total		27	10	—		7	5	13	2	—		47	17
Hamburger SV	2006–07	Bundesliga	20	5	—		0	0	7	0	—		27	5
Hamburger SV	2007–08	Bundesliga	29	9	—		3	0	9 (Note: Appearances in UEFA Cup)	5	—		41	14
Hamburger SV	2008–09	Bundesliga	31	9	—		5	1	12	4	—		48	14
Hamburger SV	2009–10	Bundesliga	6	4	—		1	0	6 (Note: Appearances in UEFA Europa League)	3	—		13	7
Hamburger SV	2010–11	Bundesliga	25	4	—		2	1	—		—		27	5
Hamburger SV	2011–12	Bundesliga	25	6	—		2	0	—		—		27	6
Hamburger SV	Total		136	37	—		13	2	34	12	—		183	51
Corinthians	2012	Série A	15	6	—		0	0	0	0	2 (Note: Appearances in FIFA Club World Cup)	2	17	8
Corinthians	2013	Série A	17	5	17	8	3	0	7 (Note: Appearances in Copa Libertadores)	4	2 (Note: Appearances in Recopa Sudamericana)	1	46	18
Corinthians	2014	Série A	28	12	12	1	5	3	—		—		45	16
Corinthians	2015	Série A	2	0	11	6	0	0	5	4	—		18	10
Corinthians	Total		62	23	40	15	8	3	12	8	4	3	126	52
Flamengo	2015	Série A	15	3	—		3	1	—		—		18	4
Flamengo	2016	Série A	21	9	13	5	4	1	3 (Note: Appearances in Copa Sudamericana)	0	3 (Note: Appearances in Primeira Liga)	3	44	18
Flamengo	2017	Série A	19	6	11	10	5	2	8 (Note: Six appearances and two goals in Copa Libertadores, two appearances in Copa Sudamericana)	2	1	0	44	20
Flamengo	2018	Série A	6	1	0	0	1	0	0	0	—		7	1
Flamengo	Total		61	19	24	15	13	4	11	2	4	3	113	43
Internacional	2018	Série A	0	0	—		—		—		—		0	0
Internacional	2019	Série A	24	10	3	1	8	5	6	4	—		41	20
Internacional	2020	Série A	3	3	6	4	0	0	6	3	—		15	10
Internacional	2021	Série A	9	1	6	1	0	0	1	0	—		16	2
Internacional	Total		36	14	15	6	8	5	13	7	—		72	32
Avaí	2022	Série A	10	0	0	0	0	0	0	0	—		10	0
Racing Club	2023	Argentine Primera División	15	1	—		1	1	6	1	—		22	3
LDU Quito	2023	Ecuadorian Serie A	13	5	—		–		7	3	—		20	8
César Vallejo	2024	Liga 1	6	3	—		—		3	0	—		9	3
Alianza Lima	2024	Liga 1	8	4	—		—		—		—		8	4
Alianza Lima	2025	Liga 1	24	15	—		—		14 (Note: Ten appearances and three goals in Copa Libertadores, four appearances in Copa Sudamericana)	3	—		38	18
Alianza Lima	2026	Liga 1	20	5	—		—		2	0	—		22	5
Alianza Lima	Total		52	24	—		—		16	3	—		68	27
Career total			484	181	79	36	50	20	115	38	8	6	736	281

=== International ===
As of match played 10 June 2025

Appearances and goals by national team and year
National team	Year	Apps	Goals
Peru	2004	3	1
Peru	2005	6	2
Peru	2006	3	2
Peru	2007	9	4
Peru	2008	4	0
Peru	2009	3	0
Peru	2010	0	0
Peru	2011	9	7
Peru	2012	8	2
Peru	2013	6	0
Peru	2014	5	2
Peru	2015	11	5
Peru	2016	12	3
Peru	2017	7	4
Peru	2018	5	3
Peru	2019	11	3
Peru	2020	0	0
Peru	2021	5	0
Peru	2022	0	0
Peru	2023	8	0
Peru	2024	9	1
Peru	2025	4	1
Total		128	40

== Honours ==
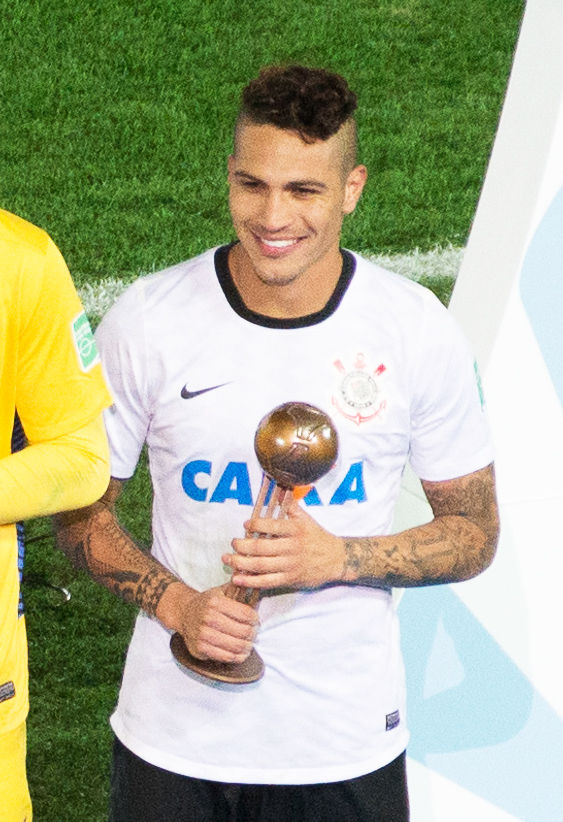
Guerrero accepting the Bronze Ball award after the 2012 FIFA Club World Cup Final

Bayern Munich

- Bundesliga: 2004–05, 2005–06
- DFB-Pokal: 2004–05, 2005–06

Hamburger SV

- UEFA Intertoto Cup: 2007

Corinthians

- Campeonato Paulista: 2013
- Recopa Sudamericana: 2013
- FIFA Club World Cup: 2012

Flamengo

- Campeonato Carioca: 2017

LDU Quito

- Serie A: 2023
- Copa Sudamericana: 2023

Peru

- Copa América runner-up: 2019; third-place: 2011, 2015

Peru U18

- Bolivarian Games: 2001

Individual

- Copa América Top Scorer: 2011, 2015, 2019
- Copa América Team of the Tournament: 2011, 2015, 2019
- FIFA Club World Cup Bronze Ball: 2012
- FIFA Club World Cup Best Forward: 2012
- Campeonato Paulista Best Forward: 2013
- Campeonato Paulista Team of the Tournament: 2013
- Copa do Brasil Best Player: 2019
- Copa do Brasil Top Scorer: 2019
- 2014 Campeonato Paulista: Top Foreign Scorer in Corinthians history
- Campeonato Brasileiro Série A Team of the Year: 2014
- Campeonato Carioca Team of the Year: 2017
- IFFHS CONMEBOL team of the decade 2011–2020

== See also ==
- List of footballers with 100 or more caps
