= Shadows of Silence =

- Directed by: Pradeepan Raveendran
- Written by: Pradeepan Raveendran
- Produced by: Pradeepan Raveendran; Nagaluxmi Sivasamboo; Kabilan Sivarathnam; Cedric Laty; Vincent Gerard
- Starring: Krishna Subramania; Unitha Ananthakumar
- Cinematography: Krshna Naganpillai
- Edited by: Muthulakshmi Varadhan
- Distributed by: Agence court metrages- France
- Release date: 2010 (Directors' Fortnight Cannes Film Festival)
- Running time: 11 minutes
- Countries: France; Sri Lanka
- Language: Tamil

Shadows of Silence is a Tamil short film directed by Pradeepan Raveendran.

== Cast ==
- Krishna Subramania
- Unitha Ananthakumar
- Krishanthi Ananthakumar
- Kajith Karunagaran
- Kalvin Karunagaran

== Festivals and awards ==
- Cannes International Film Festival - Directors Fortnight – France
- Chicago International Film Festival – USA
- Raindance International Film Festival - London – UK
- Encounters International Film Festival - Bristol – UK
- Kerala International Film Festival – India
- Taipei Golden Horse Film Festival – Taiwan
- World Film Festival of Bangkok – Thailand
- South Asian International Film Festival - New York – USA
- Cork International Film Festival – Ireland
- Jakarta International Film Festival – Indonesia
- Dubai International Film Festival – UAE
- International Film Festival of Rotterdam – Netherland
- Festival du Court Métrage de Clermont-Ferrand – France (Mention Spéciale du Jury)
- Glasgow International Short Film Festival – Scotland
