= Gustavo Hernández Pérez =

Venezuelan film director

- Hernández Pérez in 2003
- Born: February 21, 1974; Caracas, Venezuela
- Other name: Gustavo Hernández
- Occupations: Director; producer; screenwriter
- Awards: 2003: Best Latino Director. DGA Student Film Awards.; Best Director. Franklin J. Schaffner Fellowship Award. AFI Conservatory.; Platinum Award. Best Comedy Short Film. 36th Houston World Fest.; Platinum Award. Best Original Short Film. 36th Houston World Fest.; Best Narrative Short Film. Fort Lauderdale International Film Festival; Audience Award Grand Prize. Grinnell College Film Festival. Iowa.; Best Short Film. 10th Festival Internacional de Cine de Valdivia, Chile.; Best live Action Short Film. San Francisco World Film Festival.; Best Screenplay. Miami International Film Festival.; Best Integral Realization. Philadelphia Short Film Festival.; 2nd Place. XXVI Festival Internacional del Cine Independiente de Elche. Spain.; 3rd Place. Narrative Short Film. 30th Athens International Film and Video Festival. Ohio.

Gustavo Hernández Pérez (born February 21, 1974) is an American Venezuelan film director and writer.

== Life and career ==
Hernández Pérez attended the school of Mass Communications at the Universidad Central de Venezuela. He earned a Master's degree on Film Directing at the AFI Conservatory in Los Angeles, California. Among his many recognitions, Hernández Pérez was honored with the AFI Franklin J. Schaffner Fellowship Award for Best Director of the Year, and the Directors Guild of America (DGA) announced him as Best Latino Director at The 2003 DGA Student Film Awards.

The Mexican Dream, written and directed by Hernández Pérez, won 13 International Film Festivals. Became National Finalist at The 2003 Student Academy Awards, and was purchased by HBO for a programming rotation of two years.

Presumption of Death, his latest crime thriller, released on Amazon in partnership with Indie Rights, gained very positive reviews. Hernandez Perez pushed the boundaries of innovative storytelling and vision, while remaining true to his core passion for authentic and engaging cinema.

== Filmography ==
1. Presumption of Death (POD), Feature Film | Crime Thriller (2026)

2. El Silbón (The Whistler), Feature Film | Horror Mystery. In Pre-Production

3. The Mexican Dream, Short Film | Comedy (2003)

4. Juan goes to San Juan, Documentary (1998)

| Year | Title | Distribution / Awards |
|---|---|---|
| 2026 | Presumption of Death | https://www.amazon.com/gp/video/detail/B0H34LZY1V?ref_=atv_dp_share_cu_r |
| 2003 | The Mexican Dream | https://vimeo.com/140204899?fl=pl&fe=sh: Best Latino Director. Directors Guild of America. DGA Student Film Awards.; Best Director. AFI Conservatory. AFI Franklin J. Schaffner Fellowship Award.; Platinum Award. Best Comedy Short Film. 36th Houston World Fest.; Platinum Award. Best Original Short Film. 36th Houston World Fest.; Best Narrative Short Film. Ft. Lauderdale International Film Festival.; Audience Award Grand Prize. Grinnell College Film Festival. Iowa.; Best Short Film. 10th Valdivia international Film Festival, Chile.; Best live Action Short Film. San Francisco World Film Festival.; Best Screenplay. Miami International Film Festival.; Best Integral Realization. Philadelphia Short Film Festival.; 2nd Place. XXVI Festival Internacional del Cine Independiente de Elche. Spain.; 3rd Place. Narrative Short Film. 30th Athens International Film and Video Festival. Ohio. |
| 1998 | Juan goes to San Juan | https://vimeo.com/218286380?fl=pl&fe=sh |
