= Pradeepan Raveendran =

- Born: 12 July 1981 (age 43); Jaffna, Sri Lanka
- Occupation(s): Film director, producer & screenwriter
- Website: http://www.exilimage.com

Pradeepan Raveendran was born in Jaffna, Sri Lanka on 12 July 1981. He is a self-taught photographer and filmmaker. The Pradeepan's first directorial debut was in 2009 with the short film A Mango Tree in the Front Yard. This film was an official selection at the Berlin International Film Festival in 2009 and subsequently nominated for a Golden Bear. His second short film Shadows of Silence was completed in 2010. This film premiered at the Cannes International Film Festival in 2010, as part of its ‘Director’s Fortnight’. His debut feature film Soundless Dance (2019) premiered at Atlanta International Film Festival.

Films screened at various film festivals throughout the world. He founded the 'Exil Image' in 2008, The above films are produced through this production. Pradeepan has been living in Paris, France since 2004.

== Filmography ==
- A Mango Tree in the Front Yard, (2009)
- Shadows of Silence, (2010)
- Soundless Dance, (2019)
