= 2026 Clube Atlético Mineiro season =

Atlético Mineiro
2026 season
- President: Sérgio Coelho
- Head coach: Jorge Sampaoli (until 12 February); Lucas Gonçalves (interim, 12 February–25 February); Eduardo Domínguez (from 26 February)
- Stadium: Arena MRV
- Série A: 7th
- Campeonato Mineiro: Runners-up
- Copa do Brasil: Semi-finals
- Copa Sudamericana: Final
- Top goalscorer: League: Tomás Cuello (5); All: Tomás Cuello; Reinier; Bernard (9 each)
Home colours	Away colours

The 2026 season will be the 112th season in the existence of Clube Atlético Mineiro and the 20th consecutive season in the top flight of Brazilian football. In addition to the national league, Atlético Mineiro participate in this season's editions of the Campeonato Mineiro, the Copa do Brasil and the Copa Sudamericana.

== Kits ==
Supplier: Nike / Main sponsor: H2bet

Kits from the 2026 season
Home	Away	Away alt.^{1}	Goalkeeper^{1}	Goalkeeper^{2}	Goalkeeper^{2} alt.	Goalkeeper^{3}

=== Kit information ===
This is Nike's 1st year supplying Atlético Mineiro kit, having taken over from Adidas at the end of the previous season.

- Home: The club revealed their new home kit for the 2026 season on January 1st. The kit maintain Atlético's traditional colours of black and white. The shirt has a black and white vertical striped body with thin golden stripes between them, and is complemented by black shorts and black socks (swapping the traditional white socks, which will be used in the Away kit). The new kit pays tribute to the 55th anniversary of the 1971 Campeonato Nacional de Clubes, which would later be named the Campeonato Brasileiro de Futebol. Nike's logo is featured in gold.
- Away: On the same day, Atlético released their away kit. It also pays tribute to the 55th anniversary of the 1971 Brazilian League and is predominantly white. Nike's logo is also featured in gold.
- GK: The new goalkeeper kit is based on Nike's goalkeeper template for the season.

=== Kit usage ===
As of 18 March 2026

Kit	Combination	Usage
Home	Black, white and gold-striped shirt, black shorts and black socks.	Campeonato Brasileiro: used at home against Palmeiras, Remo, Internacional and São Paulo.; Campeonato Mineiro: used at home against Betim, Tombense, Cruzeiro, Athletic Club and América Mineiro; used away against North; used in the final against Cruzeiro.
Away	White shirt, white shorts and white socks.	Campeonato Brasileiro: used away against Red Bull Bragantino and Vitória.; Campeonato Mineiro: used away against América Mineiro (twice) and Pouso Alegre.
Away alt.^{1}	White shirt, white shorts and black socks.	Campeonato Brasileiro: used away against Grêmio.; Campeonato Mineiro: used away against Itabirito.
Goalkeeper^{1}	Yellow shirt, yellow shorts and yellow socks.	Campeonato Brasileiro: used at home against Palmeiras, Remo Internacional and São Paulo; used away against Red Bull Bragantino, Grêmio and Vitória.; Campeonato Mineiro: used at home against Betim, Tombense and Cruzeiro; used away against North, América Mineiro and Itabirito.
Goalkeeper^{2}	Black shirt, black shorts and black socks.	Campeonato Mineiro: used at home against Athletic Club and América Mineiro.
Goalkeeper^{2} alt.	Black shirt, black shorts and white socks.	Campeonato Mineiro: used away against Pouso Alegre.
Goalkeeper^{3}	Purple shirt, purple shorts and purple socks.	Campeonato Mineiro: used away against América Mineiro; used in the final against Cruzeiro.

== Players ==
=== First team squad ===
As of 13 September 2026

Note: Flags indicate national team as defined under FIFA eligibility rules; some limited exceptions apply. Players may hold more than one non-FIFA nationality.

No.	Pos.	Nation	Player
1	GK	BRA	Gabriel Delfim
2	DF	BRA	Natanael
3	DF	BRA	Léo Duarte
4	DF	BRA	Ruan Tressoldi
5	MF	BRA	Alexsander
6	DF	BRA	Renan Lodi
7	MF	BRA	Fred
8	MF	BRA	Maycon
9	FW	COL	Mateo Cassierra
10	MF	BRA	Gustavo Scarpa
11	MF	BRA	Bernard
13	DF	BRA	Lyanco
14	DF	BRA	Vitor Hugo
15	MF	COL	Kevin Castaño (on loan from River Plate)
17	MF	BRA	Igor Gomes
18	FW	URU	Thiago Borbas (on loan from Red Bull Bragantino)

No.	Pos.	Nation	Player
19	MF	BRA	Reinier
21	MF	ECU	Alan Franco
22	GK	BRA	Everson (captain)
23	DF	ECU	Ángelo Preciado
25	MF	ARG	Tomás Pérez (on loan from Porto)
27	FW	ECU	Alan Minda
28	FW	ARG	Tomás Cuello
29	FW	BRA	Cauã Soares
30	MF	BRA	Victor Hugo
31	GK	BRA	Robert
36	DF	BRA	Kauã Pascini
38	MF	BRA	Índio
39	MF	GUI	Mamady Cissé
40	DF	BRA	Vitão
46	GK	BRA	Pedro Cobra
92	FW	BRA	Dudu

== Transfers ==
=== In ===
No.	Pos	Player	Transferred from	Fee	Date	Source
16	DF	(Brazil) Renan Lodi	Unattached	Free transfer	1 January 2026	
14	DF	(Brazil) Vitor Hugo	Bahia	€1,000,000	9 January 2026	
8	MF	(Brazil) Maycon	(Ukraine) Shakhtar Donetsk	Free transfer	13 January 2026	
27	FW	(Ecuador) Alan Minda	(Belgium) Cercle Brugge	€7,000,000	14 January 2026	
23	DF	(Ecuador) Ángelo Preciado	(Czech Republic) Sparta Prague	€5,000,000	16 January 2026	
30	MF	(Brazil) Victor Hugo	Flamengo	€2,150,000	18 January 2026	
9	FW	(Colombia) Mateo Cassierra	(Russia) Zenit Saint Petersburg	€8,000,000	23 January 2026	
25	MF	(Argentina) Tomás Pérez	(Portugal) Porto	Loan	19 February 2026	
31	GK	(Brazil) Robert	Athletic	Loan return	25 March 2026	
4	DF	(Brazil) Ruan Tressoldi	(Italy) Sassuolo	€3,500,000	1 July 2026	
15	DF	(Brazil) Léo Duarte	(Turkey) İstanbul Başakşehir	Free transfer	1 July 2026	
18	FW	(Uruguay) Thiago Borbas	Red Bull Bragantino	Loan	30 July 2026	
7	MF	(Brazil) Fred	(Turkey) Fenerbahçe	€2,000,000	14 August 2026	
15	MF	(Colombia) Kevin Castaño	(Argentina) River Plate	Loan	14 August 2026	

=== Out ===
No.	Pos	Player	Transferred to	Fee	Date	Source
8	MF	(Argentina) Fausto Vera	(Argentina) River Plate	Loan	1 January 2026	
14	DF	(Brazil) Vitor Hugo	Bahia	Loan return	1 January 2026	
26	DF	(Argentina) Renzo Saravia	Unattached	End of contract	1 January 2026	
32	GK	(Brazil) Gabriel Átila	Vila Nova	Free transfer	1 January 2026	
38	DF	(Brazil) Caio Paulista	Palmeiras	Loan return	1 January 2026	
—	DF	(Brazil) Bruno Fuchs	Palmeiras	€4,000,000	1 January 2026	
13	DF	(Brazil) Guilherme Arana	Fluminense	€5,000,000	4 January 2026	
19	FW	(Brazil) João Marcelo	(United Arab Emirates) Shabab Al Ahli	Loan	5 January 2026	
30	FW	(Brazil) Isaac	(Italy) Hellas Verona	Free transfer	7 January 2026	
25	MF	(Brazil) Gabriel Menino	Santos	Loan	14 January 2026	
31	GK	(Brazil) Robert	Athletic	Loan	15 January 2026	
77	FW	(Brazil) Biel	(Portugal) Sporting CP	Loan return	28 January 2026	
33	FW	(Brazil) Rony	Santos	€3,000,000	30 January 2026	
—	FW	(Brazil) Caio Maia	Londrina	Loan	5 February 2026	
42	FW	(Brazil) Cadu	Goiás	Loan	10 February 2026	
37	FW	(Brazil) Júnior Santos	Botafogo	Loan	6 March 2026	
7	FW	(Brazil) Hulk	Unattached	Free transfer	2 May 2026	
48	MF	(Brazil) Mateus Iseppe	(Portugal) Nacional	Loan	1 July 2026	
6	DF	(Paraguay) Júnior Alonso	Unattached	Free transfer	9 July 2026	
3	DF	(Chile) Iván Román	(Chile) Colo-Colo	Loan	8 August 2026	
20	MF	(Brazil) Patrick	Red Bull Bragantino	Loan	11 September 2026	

=== Transfer summary ===
Undisclosed fees are not included in the transfer totals.

Expenditure

Total: ▼€28,650,000

Income

Total: ▲€12,000,000

Net total

Total: ▼€16,650,000

== Competitions ==
=== Overview ===
Competition	First match	Last match	Starting round	Final position	Record							
Competition	First match	Last match	Starting round	Final position	Pld	W	D	L	GF	GA	GD	Win %
Campeonato Brasileiro	28 January 2026	2 December 2026	Matchday 1	TBD	34	14	8	12	44	40	+4	41.18
Campeonato Mineiro	11 January 2026	8 March 2026	First stage	Runners-up	11	3	7	1	17	10	+7	27.27
Copa do Brasil	23 April 2026	7 November 2026	Fifth round	Semi-finals	8	3	3	2	8	8	+0	37.50
Copa Sudamericana	8 April 2026	21 November 2026	Group stage	TBD	12	6	2	4	18	14	+4	50.00
Total					65	26	20	19	87	72	+15	40.00

Last updated: 4 November 2026
Source: Soccerway

=== Campeonato Mineiro ===
==== First stage ====
Pos	Team	Pld	W	D	L	GF	GA	GD	Pts	Qualification or relegation
1	Atlético Mineiro	8	3	5	0	16	8	+8	14	Knockout stage
2	URT	8	3	2	3	7	7	0	11	
3	Uberlândia	8	2	3	3	8	12	−4	9	
4	Democrata-GV (R)	8	2	1	5	3	8	−5	7	2027 Módulo II

Source: FMF
(R) Relegated

==== Matches ====
11 January 1	Atlético Mineiro	1–1	Betim	Belo Horizonte
16:00 UTC−3	Reinier 22'	Report	Diego Jardel 47'	Stadium: Arena MRV; Attendance: 18,340; Referee: Felipe Fernandes de Lima

14 January 2	North	1–1	Atlético Mineiro	Montes Claros
20:00 UTC−3	Ermel 45+2'	Report	Rony 74'	Stadium: Arena Credinor; Attendance: 3,888; Referee: André Luiz Skettino Policarpo Bento

18 January 3	Atlético Mineiro	0–0	Tombense	Belo Horizonte
18:00 UTC−3		Report		Stadium: Arena MRV; Attendance: 18,582; Referee: Daniel da Cunha Oliveira Filho

21 January 4	América Mineiro	1–1	Atlético Mineiro	Belo Horizonte
21:30 UTC−3	Gabriel Barros 15'	Report	Reinier 30'	Stadium: Independência; Attendance: 6,213; Referee: Murilo Francisco Misson Júnior

25 January 5	Atlético Mineiro	2–1	Cruzeiro	Belo Horizonte
18:00 UTC−3	Bernard 56'; Hulk 68'	Report	Kaio Jorge 26'	Stadium: Arena MRV; Attendance: 39,332; Referee: Davi de Oliveira Lacerda

31 January 6	Pouso Alegre	1–3	Atlético Mineiro	Pouso Alegre
16:30 UTC−3	Gabriel Tota 22'	Report	Reinier 51'; Cuello 54'; Ruan Tressoldi 88'	Stadium: Manduzão; Attendance: 11,413; Referee: Ronei Cândido Alves

7 February 7	Atlético Mineiro	1–1	Athletic Club	Belo Horizonte
18:30 UTC−3	Renan Lodi 5'	Report	Ronaldo Tavares 62' (pen.)	Stadium: Arena MRV; Attendance: 20,187; Referee: Antônio Márcio Teixeira

14 February 8	Itabirito	2–7	Atlético Mineiro	Nova Lima
19:00 UTC−3	Romário 79'; Mateus Apolinário 87'	Report	Victor Hugo 17'; Hulk 32', 52', 61' (pen.); Gustavo Scarpa 44'; Cassierra 72' (pen.); Renan Lodi 77'	Stadium: Estádio Castor Cifuentes; Attendance: 2,177; Referee: Felipe Fernandes de Lima

==== Semi-finals ====
22 February First leg	Atlético Mineiro	1–1	América Mineiro	Belo Horizonte
18:00 UTC−3	Dudu 51'	Report	Yarlen 90+3'	Stadium: Arena MRV; Attendance: 31,916; Referee: Matheus Delgado Candançan

1 March Second leg	América Mineiro	0–0 (1–1 agg.) (2–4 p)	Atlético Mineiro	Belo Horizonte
18:00 UTC−3		Report		Stadium: Independência; Attendance: 5,382; Referee: Flávio Rodrigues de Souza
	Penalties
	Eduardo Person (penalty missed); Gabriel Barros (penalty scored); Felipe Amaral (penalty missed); Paulinho (penalty scored)		(penalty scored) Hulk; (penalty scored) Renan Lodi; (penalty missed) Júnior Alonso; (penalty scored) Maycon; (penalty scored) Everson

===== Final =====
8 March Single match	Cruzeiro	1–0	Atlético Mineiro	Belo Horizonte
18:00 UTC−3	Kaio Jorge 60'	Report		Stadium: Mineirão; Attendance: 49,675; Referee: Matheus Delgado Candançan

=== Copa Sudamericana ===
==== Group stage ====
Pos	Team	Pld	W	D	L	GF	GA	GD	Pts	Qualification
1	(Brazil) Atlético Mineiro	6	3	1	2	8	6	+2	10	Advance to round of 16
2	(Peru) Cienciano	6	2	2	2	5	7	−2	8	Advance to knockout round play-offs
3	(Uruguay) Juventud	6	1	4	1	10	7	+3	7 (Note: Head-to-head points: Juventud 4, Academia Puerto Cabello 1.)	
4	(Venezuela) Academia Puerto Cabello	6	2	1	3	6	9	−3	7	

Source: CONMEBOL
Rules for classification: 1) Points; 2) Head-to-head points; 3) Head-to-head goal difference; 4) Head-to-head goals scored; 5) Goal difference; 6) Goals scored; 7) Red cards; 8) Yellow cards; 9) Drawing of lots.
Notes:

8 April 1	Academia Puerto Cabello (Venezuela)	2–1	(Brazil) Atlético Mineiro	Valencia, Venezuela
23:00 UTC−3	Castillo 16'; Ramos 39'	Report	Dudu 27'	Stadium: Estadio Misael Delgado; Referee: Yael Falcón Pérez (Argentina)

16 April 2	Atlético Mineiro (Brazil)	2–1	(Uruguay) Juventud	Belo Horizonte, Brazil
19:00 UTC−3	Bernard 43'; Cassierra 90'	Report	Pérez 55'	Stadium: Arena MRV; Attendance: 18,120; Referee: Carlos Ortega (Colombia)

29 April 3	Cienciano (Peru)	1–0	(Brazil) Atlético Mineiro	Cusco, Peru
21:30 UTC−3	Bandiera 30'	Report		Stadium: Estadio Garcilaso; Referee: Yael Falcón Pérez (Argentina)

5 May 4	Juventud (Uruguay)	2–2	(Brazil) Atlético Mineiro	Montevideo, Uruguay
19:00 UTC−3	Pablo Lago 78'; Marcelo Pérez 87'	Report	Alan Minda 37'; Vitor Hugo 77'	Stadium: Estadio Centenario; Referee: Leandro Rey Hilfer (Argentina)

21 May 5	Atlético Mineiro (Brazil)	2–0	(Peru) Cienciano	Belo Horizonte, Brazil
19:00 UTC−3	Renan Lodi 27'; Bernard 39'			Stadium: Arena MRV; Attendance: 18,245; Referee: Carlos Ortega (Colombia)

27 May 6	Atlético Mineiro (Brazil)	1–0	(Venezuela) Academia Puerto Cabello	Belo Horizonte, Brazil
19:00 UTC−3	Bernard 61'	Report		Stadium: Arena MRV; Attendance: 24,656; Referee: Leandro Rey Hilfer (Argentina)

==== Round of 16 ====
12 August First leg	Red Bull Bragantino (Brazil)	0–1	(Brazil) Atlético Mineiro	Bragança Paulista, Brazil
19:00 UTC−3		Report	Cuello 73'	Stadium: Estádio Cícero de Souza Marques; Attendance: 3,879; Referee: Leandro Rey Hilfer (Argentina)

19 August Second leg	Atlético Mineiro (Brazil)	2–2 (3–2 agg.)	(Brazil) Red Bull Bragantino	Belo Horizonte, Brazil
19:00 UTC−3	Maycon 52'; Cuello 90+3'	Report	Eric Ramires 45+8'; Sasha 81'	Stadium: Arena MRV; Attendance: 30,026; Referee: Maximiliano Ramírez (Argentina)

==== Quarter-finals ====
9 September First leg	Santos (Brazil)	2–0	(Brazil) Atlético Mineiro	Santos, Brazil
19:00 UTC−3	Arão 31'; Oliva 68'	Report		Stadium: Vila Belmiro; Attendance: 12,132; Referee: Alexis Herrera (Venezuela)

16 September Second leg	Atlético Mineiro (Brazil)	4–2 (4–4 agg.) (3–1 p)	(Brazil) Santos	Belo Horizonte, Brazil
19:00 UTC−3	Bernard 1'; Reinier 20', 41'; Cuello 90+2'	Report	Lyanco 28' (o.g.); Gabriel 72'	Stadium: Arena MRV; Attendance: 40,013; Referee: Facundo Tello (Argentina)
	Penalties
	Gustavo Scarpa (penalty scored); Igor Gomes (penalty scored); Fred (penalty missed); Thiago Borbas (penalty scored)		(penalty missed) Gabriel; (penalty missed) João Schmidt; (penalty scored) Bontempo; (penalty missed) Arthur

==== Semi-finals ====
14 October First leg	Atlético Mineiro (Brazil)	3–0	(Uruguay) Montevideo City Torque	Belo Horizonte, Brazil
19:00 UTC−3	Reinier 37'; Bernard 42'; Thiago Borbas 80'	Report		Stadium: Arena MRV; Attendance: 38,020; Referee: Carlos Betancur (Colombia)

21 October Second leg	Montevideo City Torque (Uruguay)	2–0 (2–3 agg.)	(Brazil) Atlético Mineiro	Montevideo, Uruguay
19:00 UTC−3	Kevin Silva 89'; Kagelmacher 90+3'	Report		Stadium: Estadio Centenario; Referee: Cristián Garay (Chile)

==== Final ====
21 November Final	Atlético Mineiro (Brazil)	v	(Argentina) Boca Juniors	Barranquilla, Colombia
17:30 UTC−5				Stadium: Estadio Metropolitano Roberto Meléndez

=== Campeonato Brasileiro ===
==== Standings ====
Pos	Team	Pld	W	D	L	GF	GA	GD	Pts	Qualification or relegation
5	Athletico Paranaense	34	15	9	10	51	43	+8	54	Qualification for Copa Libertadores second stage (Note: Since Palmeiras, who qualified for the Copa Libertadores group stage on league performance, reached the 2026 Copa do Brasil final, the Copa Libertadores second stage berth allocated to the 2026 Copa do Brasil runners-up was passed to the Série A's highest-placed team not already qualified.)
6	Bahia	34	14	11	9	50	45	+5	53	Qualification for Copa Libertadores second stage
7	Atlético Mineiro	34	14	8	12	44	40	+4	50	Qualification for Copa Sudamericana group stage
8	Red Bull Bragantino	34	13	8	13	44	39	+5	47	Qualification for Copa Sudamericana group stage
9	Santos	34	12	11	11	50	49	+1	47	Qualification for Copa Sudamericana group stage

Updated to match(es) played on 6 November 2026. Source: CBF
Rules for classification: 1) points; 2) wins; 3) goal difference; 4) goals scored; 5) head-to-head results (only between two teams); 6) fewest red cards; 7) fewest yellow cards; 8) drawing of lots.

==== Result by round ====
Round	1	2	3	4	5	6	7	8	9	10	11	12	13	14	15	16	17	18	19	20	21	22	23	24	25	26	27	28	29	30	31	32	33	34	35	36	37	38
Result	D	L	D	L	W	L	W	L	W	W	L	L	L	W	D	W	L	W	D	W	W	D	W	W	W	L	W	D	D	W	W	L	L	L				
Position	11	15	15	17	13	16	11	13	9	8	8	12	15	11	13	10	12	9	13	8	7	11	8	9	7	8	7	7	7	7	6	6	7	7				

Source: CBF
P = Postponed

==== Matches ====
28 January 1	Atlético Mineiro	2–2	Palmeiras	Belo Horizonte
19:00 UTC−3	Victor Hugo 44'; Khellven 74' (o.g.)	Report	José López 27'; Vitor Roque 84'	Stadium: Arena MRV; Attendance: 25,770; Referee: Bruno Arleu de Araújo

4 February 2	Red Bull Bragantino	1–0	Atlético Mineiro	Bragança Paulista
19:00 UTC−3	Gustavinho 38'	Report		Stadium: Estádio Cícero de Souza Marques; Attendance: 3,459; Referee: Lucas Paulo Torezin

11 February 3	Atlético Mineiro	3–3	Remo	Belo Horizonte
20:00 UTC−3	Hulk 22'; Ruan Tressoldi 70'; Dudu 90+8'	Report	Vitor Bueno 42'; Yago Pikachu 87'; Alef Manga 90+2'	Stadium: Arena MRV; Attendance: 16,056; Referee: Matheus Delgado Candançan

25 February 4	Grêmio	2–1	Atlético Mineiro	Porto Alegre
21:30 UTC−3	Noriega 51'; Marlon 66'	Report	Victor Hugo 56'	Stadium: Arena do Grêmio; Attendance: 15,714; Referee: Raphael Claus

11 March 5	Atlético Mineiro	1–0	Internacional	Belo Horizonte
19:00 UTC−3	Cuello 2'	Report		Stadium: Arena MRV; Attendance: 10,132; Referee: Ramon Abatti Abel

14 March 6	Vitória	2–0	Atlético Mineiro	Salvador
18:30 UTC−3	Renato Kayzer 20'; Erick 68'	Report		Stadium: Barradão; Attendance: 16,533; Referee: João Vitor Gobi

18 March 7	Atlético Mineiro	1–0	São Paulo	Belo Horizonte
20:00 UTC−3	Román 65'	Report		Stadium: Mineirão; Attendance: 36,830; Referee: Fernando Antônio Mendes de Salles Nascimento Filho

21 March 8	Fluminense	1–0	Atlético Mineiro	Rio de Janeiro
18:30 UTC−3	Rodrigo Castillo 29'	Report		Stadium: Maracanã; Attendance: 22,025; Referee: Flávio Rodrigues de Souza

2 April 9	Chapecoense	0–4	Atlético Mineiro	Chapecó
19:00 UTC−3		Report	Bernard 23'; Reinier 30'; Cuello 35'; Dudu 90+6'	Stadium: Arena Condá; Attendance: 10,614; Referee: João Vitor Gobi

5 April 10	Atlético Mineiro	2–1	Athletico Paranaense	Belo Horizonte
17:30 UTC−3	Victor Hugo 6'; Gustavo Scarpa 80'	Report	Julimar 88'	Stadium: Arena MRV; Attendance: 29,356; Referee: Matheus Delgado Candançan

11 April 11	Santos	1–0	Atlético Mineiro	Santos
20:00 UTC−3	Moisés 63'	Report		Stadium: Vila Belmiro; Attendance: 12,175; Referee: Rafael Rodrigo Klein

19 April 12	Coritiba	2–0	Atlético Mineiro	Curitiba
16:00 UTC−3	Breno Lopes 7'; Pedro Rocha 58'	Report		Stadium: Estádio Couto Pereira; Attendance: 28,426; Referee: Fernando Antônio Mendes de Salles Nascimento Filho

26 April 13	Atlético Mineiro	0–4	Flamengo	Belo Horizonte
20:30 UTC−3		Report	Pedro 8', 84'; Plata 31'; De Arrascaeta 45+2'	Stadium: Arena MRV; Attendance: 28,148; Referee: Rafael Rodrigo Klein

2 May 14	Cruzeiro	1–3	Atlético Mineiro	Belo Horizonte
21:00 UTC−3	Kaio Jorge 86' (pen.)	Report	Alan Minda 12'; Maycon 32' (pen.); Cassierra 72'	Stadium: Mineirão; Attendance: 53,921; Referee: Flávio Rodrigues de Souza

10 May 15	Atlético Mineiro	1–1	Botafogo	Belo Horizonte
16:00 UTC−3	Cassierra 23'	Report	Arthur Cabral 90'	Stadium: Mineirão; Attendance: 33,043; Referee: Ramon Abatti Abel

16 May 16	Atlético Mineiro	3–1	Mirassol	Belo Horizonte
18:30 UTC−3	Alan Minda 16'; Maycon 60' (pen.); Cissé 81'	Report	Willian Machado 39'	Stadium: Arena MRV; Attendance: 20,027; Referee: Lucas Casagrande

24 May 17	Corinthians	1–0	Atlético Mineiro	São Paulo
18:30 UTC−3	Zakaria Labyad 87'	Report		Stadium: Neo Química Arena; Attendance: 42,920; Referee: Rafael Rodrigo Klein

31 May 18	Vasco	0–1	Atlético Mineiro	Rio de Janeiro
16:00 UTC−3		Report	Vitor Hugo 32'	Stadium: Estádio São Januário; Attendance: 20,133; Referee: Anderson Daronco

21 July 19	Atlético Mineiro	1–1	Bahia	Belo Horizonte
19:30 UTC−3	Ruan Tressoldi 45+1'	Report	Ademir 57'	Stadium: Arena MRV; Attendance: 31,018; Referee: Bráulio da Silva Machado

26 July 20	Palmeiras	1–2	Atlético Mineiro	São Paulo
19:30 UTC−3	Felipe Anderson 75'	Report	Victor Hugo 54'; Igor Gomes 77'	Stadium: Nubank Parque; Attendance: 30,304; Referee: Bruno Arleu de Araújo

8 August 22	Remo	2–2	Atlético Mineiro	Belém
18:30 UTC−3	Jajá 3'; Taliari 74'	Report	Reinier 34'; Bernard 38'	Stadium: Mangueirão; Attendance: 15,235; Referee: Ramon Abatti Abel

16 August 23	Atlético Mineiro	3–0	Grêmio	Belo Horizonte
16:00 UTC−3	Vitor Hugo 19'; Cuello 62', 66'	Report		Stadium: Arena MRV; Attendance: 30,126; Referee: Bruno Arleu de Araújo

22 August 24	Internacional	0–0	Atlético Mineiro	Porto Alegre
18:30 UTC−3		Report		Stadium: Estádio Beira-Rio; Attendance: 20,464; Referee: Lucas Casagrande

29 August 25	Atlético Mineiro	2–1	Vitória	Belo Horizonte
18:30 UTC−3	Thiago Borbas 25'; Reinier 63'	Report	Erick 87'	Stadium: Mineirão; Attendance: 23,370; Referee: Edina Alves Batista

5 September 26	São Paulo	2–0	Atlético Mineiro	São Paulo
18:30 UTC−3	Luciano 67'; Iago 69'	Report		Stadium: Morumbi; Attendance: 39,068; Referee: Bráulio da Silva Machado

12 September 27	Atlético Mineiro	3–1	Fluminense	Belo Horizonte
16:00 UTC−3	Reinier 61'; Cuello 63'; Vitão 81'	Report	Castillo 90'	Stadium: Arena MRV; Attendance: 20,073; Referee: Matheus Delgado Candançan

19 September 28	Atlético Mineiro	1–1	Chapecoense	Belo Horizonte
16:00 UTC−3	Cassierra 69'	Report	Túlio Eduardo 44'	Stadium: Arena MRV; Attendance: 35,844; Referee: Raphael Claus

3 October 21	Atlético Mineiro	1–0	Red Bull Bragantino	Belo Horizonte
18:30 UTC−3	Bernard 18'	Report		Stadium: Arena MRV; Attendance: 22,159; Referee: Lucas Casagrande

8 October 29	Athletico Paranaense	2–2	Atlético Mineiro	Curitiba
20:00 UTC−3	Vargas 8'; Viveros 90+3'	Report	Bernard 27'; Lyanco 90+7'	Stadium: Arena da Baixada; Attendance: 24,891; Referee: Ramon Abatti Abel

11 October 30	Atlético Mineiro	2–1	Santos	Belo Horizonte
16:00 UTC−3	Vitor Hugo 90'; Thiago Borbas 90+7'	Report	Gabriel 88'	Stadium: Arena MRV; Attendance: 29,777; Referee: Alex Gomes Stefano

17 October 31	Atlético Mineiro	1–0	Coritiba	Belo Horizonte
18:30 UTC−3	Igor Gomes 78'	Report		Stadium: Arena MRV; Attendance: 25,085; Referee: Davi de Oliveira Lacerda

26 October 32	Flamengo	3–2	Atlético Mineiro	Rio de Janeiro
20:00 UTC−3	Plata 34'; De Arrascaeta 41'; Carrascal 90+9' (pen.)	Report	Bernard 7'; Renan Lodi 59'	Stadium: Maracanã; Attendance: 60,624; Referee: Rodrigo José Pereira de Lima

29 October 33	Atlético Mineiro	0–1	Cruzeiro	Belo Horizonte
19:30 UTC−3		Report	Kaio Jorge 4'	Stadium: Arena MRV; Attendance: 38,072; Referee: Raphael Claus

4 November 34	Botafogo	1–0	Atlético Mineiro	Rio de Janeiro
21:30 UTC−3	Edenilson 19'	Report		Stadium: Estádio Nilton Santos; Referee: Lucas Casagrande

14 November 35	Mirassol	v	Atlético Mineiro	Mirassol
18:30 UTC−3		Report		Stadium: Estádio José Maria de Campos Maia

25 November 36	Atlético Mineiro	v	Corinthians	Belo Horizonte
20:00 UTC−3		Report		Stadium: Arena MRV

28–29 November 37	Atlético Mineiro	v	Vasco	Belo Horizonte
--:-- UTC−3		Report		Stadium: Arena MRV

2 December 38	Bahia	v	Atlético Mineiro	Salvador
--:-- UTC−3		Report		Stadium: Arena Fonte Nova

=== Copa do Brasil ===
==== Fifth round ====
23 April First leg	Atlético Mineiro	2–1	Ceará	Belo Horizonte
19:00 UTC−3	Cassierra 44'; Renan Lodi 73'	Report	Wendel Silva 65'	Stadium: Arena MRV; Attendance: 13,633; Referee: Bráulio da Silva Machado

13 May Second leg	Ceará	2–1 (3–3 agg.) (2–4 p)	Atlético Mineiro	Fortaleza
21:30 UTC−3	Alex Silva 8' (pen.); Everson 23' (o.g.)	Report	Kauã Pascini 90'	Stadium: Arena Castelão; Attendance: 8,130; Referee: Matheus Delgado Candançan
	Penalties
	Alano (penalty scored); Fernando (penalty missed); Éder (penalty scored); Rafael Ramos (penalty missed)		Cassierra (penalty scored); Alexsander (penalty missed); Cuello (penalty scored); Lyanco (penalty scored); Everson (penalty scored)

==== Round of 16 ====
1 August First leg	Atlético Mineiro	0–0	Juventude	Belo Horizonte
19:30 UTC−3		Report		Stadium: Arena MRV; Attendance: 37,041; Referee: Fernando Antônio Mendes de Salles Nascimento Filho

4 August Second leg	Juventude	0–1 (0–1 agg.)	Atlético Mineiro	Caxias do Sul
19:30 UTC−3		Report	Alan Minda 90+4'	Stadium: Estádio Alfredo Jaconi; Attendance: 10,206; Referee: Flávio Rodrigues de Souza

==== Quarter-finals ====
25 August First leg	Cruzeiro	1–1	Atlético Mineiro	Belo Horizonte
21:00 UTC−3	Arroyo 60'	Report	Renan Lodi 60'	Stadium: Mineirão; Attendance: 59,225; Referee: Flávio Rodrigues de Souza

1 September Second leg	Atlético Mineiro	2–1 (3–2 agg.)	Cruzeiro	Belo Horizonte
21:00 UTC−3	Victor Hugo 78'; Fred 88'	Report	Kaio Jorge 30' (pen.)	Stadium: Arena MRV; Attendance: 42,992; Referee: Raphael Claus

==== Semi-finals ====
1 November First leg	Grêmio	2–0	Atlético Mineiro	Porto Alegre
18:30 UTC−3	Carlos Vinícius 11'; Noriega 47'	Report		Stadium: Arena do Grêmio; Attendance: 50,928; Referee: Davi de Oliveira Lacerda

7 November Second leg	Atlético Mineiro	1–1 (1–3 agg.)	Grêmio	Belo Horizonte
18:00 UTC−3		Report		Stadium: Arena MRV; Referee: Ramon Abatti Abel

== Statistics ==
=== Squad appearances and goals ===
No.	Pos	Nat	Player	Total		Brasileiro		Mineiro		Copa do Brasil		Sudamericana	
No.	Pos	Nat	Player	Apps	Goals	Apps	Goals	Apps	Goals	Apps	Goals	Apps	Goals
Goalkeepers
1	GK	(Brazil) BRA	Gabriel Delfim	15	0	10	0	1	0	1	0	3	0
22	GK	(Brazil) BRA	Everson	49	0	24	0	10	0	6	0	9	0
31	GK	(Brazil) BRA	Robert	0	0	0	0	0	0	0	0	0	0
46	GK	(Brazil) BRA	Pedro Cobra	0	0	0	0	0	0	0	0	0	0
Defenders
2	DF	(Brazil) BRA	Natanael	44	0	24	0	7	0	3+3	0	5+2	0
3	DF	(Brazil) BRA	Léo Duarte	6	0	3+2	0	0	0	1	0	0	0
4	DF	(Brazil) BRA	Ruan Tressoldi	40	3	20	2	8+1	1	5	0	6	0
6	DF	(Brazil) BRA	Renan Lodi	53	6	26+2	1	7+1	2	7	2	10	1
13	DF	(Brazil) BRA	Lyanco	26	1	11+2	1	0	0	4	0	7+2	0
14	DF	(Brazil) BRA	Vitor Hugo	41	4	12+7	3	8+1	0	5	0	5+3	1
23	DF	(Ecuador) ECU	Ángelo Preciado	25	0	10+4	0	4+1	0	1+2	0	3	0
32	DF	(Brazil) BRA	Luís Gustavo	2	0	0	0	0+1	0	0	0	0+1	0
36	DF	(Brazil) BRA	Kauã Pascini	18	1	9+3	0	3	0	0+1	1	1+1	0
40	DF	(Brazil) BRA	Vitão	17	1	9	1	2	0	0+2	0	3+1	0
Midfielders
5	MF	(Brazil) BRA	Alexsander	23	0	6+7	0	1+1	0	0+2	0	2+4	0
7	MF	(Brazil) BRA	Fred	10	1	4+2	0	0	0	2	1	2	0
8	MF	(Brazil) BRA	Maycon	43	3	17+4	2	6+1	0	4+1	0	9+1	1
10	MF	(Brazil) BRA	Gustavo Scarpa	30	2	5+10	1	6+1	1	0+2	0	2+4	0
11	MF	(Brazil) BRA	Bernard	51	11	20+7	5	3+3	1	6	0	11+1	5
15	MF	(Colombia) COL	Kevin Castaño	17	0	4+6	0	0	0	3	0	4	0
17	MF	(Brazil) BRA	Igor Gomes	31	2	7+8	2	4+3	0	0+3	0	2+4	0
19	MF	(Brazil) BRA	Reinier	45	10	14+10	4	6+3	3	1+1	0	7+3	3
21	MF	(Ecuador) ECU	Alan Franco	49	0	22+1	0	9+1	0	6	0	8+2	0
25	MF	(Argentina) ARG	Tomás Pérez	22	0	13+4	0	0	0	2	0	2+1	0
30	MF	(Brazil) BRA	Victor Hugo	47	6	22+4	4	6+2	1	4+1	1	6+2	0
38	MF	(Brazil) BRA	Índio	2	0	0	0	0+2	0	0	0	0	0
39	MF	(Guinea) GUI	Mamady Cissé	34	1	8+12	1	2+2	0	2+1	0	1+6	0
48	MF	(Brazil) BRA	Gutte	1	0	0+1	0	0	0	0	0	0	0
Forwards
9	FW	(Colombia) COL	Mateo Cassierra	40	6	10+12	3	0+3	1	6	1	5+4	1
18	FW	(Uruguay) URU	Thiago Borbas	9	3	4+2	2	0	0	0+1	0	0+2	1
27	FW	(Ecuador) ECU	Alan Minda	39	4	8+12	2	0+4	0	1+6	1	3+5	1
28	FW	(Argentina) ARG	Tomás Cuello	50	9	21+5	5	5+4	1	4+3	0	8	3
29	FW	(Brazil) BRA	Cauã Soares	14	0	1+7	0	0+1	0	0+2	0	1+2	0
41	FW	(Brazil) BRA	Murillo Fernandes	1	0	0	0	0+1	0	0	0	0	0
59	FW	(Brazil) BRA	Gabriel Veneno	1	0	0+1	0	0	0	0	0	0	0
92	FW	(Brazil) BRA	Dudu	36	3	3+16	2	5+3	1	2+1	0	2+4	0
Players who have made an appearance this season but have left the club
3	DF	(Chile) CHI	Iván Román	9	1	6	1	1	0	1	0	1	0
6	DF	(Paraguay) PAR	Júnior Alonso	19	0	10	0	5	0	0	0	4	0
7	FW	(Brazil) BRA	Hulk	22	5	11+1	1	6+2	4	0+1	0	0+1	0
33	FW	(Brazil) BRA	Rony	3	1	0	0	3	1	0	0	0	0
42	FW	(Brazil) BRA	Cadu	2	0	0	0	1+1	0	0	0	0	0
48	MF	(Brazil) BRA	Mateus Iseppe	3	0	0	0	2	0	0	0	0+1	0
