= Cauã Soares =

Brazilian footballer

Personal information
- Full name: Cauã Campos Soares
- Date of birth: 30 June 2008 (age 18)
- Place of birth: Montes Claros, Brazil
- Height: 1.80 m (5 ft 11 in)
- Position: Forward

Team information
- Current team: Atlético Mineiro
- Number: 29

Youth career
- 2022–2026: Atlético Mineiro

Senior career*
Years	Team	Apps	(Gls)
2026–	Atlético Mineiro	2	(0)
- * Club domestic league appearances and goals as of 21:43, 14 April 2026 (UTC)

Cauã Campos Soares (born 30 June 2008) is a Brazilian footballer who plays as a forward for Atlético Mineiro.

== Career ==
Born in Montes Claros, Minas Gerais, Cauã Soares joined Atlético Mineiro's youth setup in 2022. On 13 October 2024, he signed his first professional contract with the club, agreeing to a deal until 2027.

After progressing through the youth categories, Cauã Soares made his first team debut on 14 January 2026, coming on as a second-half substitute for fellow youth graduate Mateus Iseppe in a 1–1 Campeonato Mineiro away draw against North.

== Career statistics ==
As of 14 April 2026

Club	Season	League			State League		Cup		Continental		Other		Total	
Club	Season	Division	Apps	Goals	Apps	Goals	Apps	Goals	Apps	Goals	Apps	Goals	Apps	Goals
Atlético Mineiro	2026	Série A	1	0	1	0	0	0	1 (Note: Appearance(s) in Copa Sudamericana)	0	—		3	0
Career total			1	0	1	0	0	0	1	0	0	0	3	0
