= Gutte =

Brazilian footballer

Personal information
- Full name: João Pedro Porto Lucrécio
- Date of birth: 5 April 2008 (age 18)
- Place of birth: Porto Alegre, Brazil
- Height: 1.75 m (5 ft 9 in)
- Position: Midfielder

Team information
- Current team: Atlético Mineiro
- Number: 48

Youth career
- 2018–2019: Grêmio
- 2023–: Atlético Mineiro

Senior career*
Years	Team	Apps	(Gls)
2026–	Atlético Mineiro	1	(0)
- * Club domestic league appearances and goals as of 23:47, 8 November 2026 (UTC)

João Pedro Porto Lucrécio (born 5 April 2008), commonly known as Gutte, is a Brazilian footballer who plays as a midfielder for Atlético Mineiro.

== Club career ==
Born in Porto Alegre, Rio Grande do Sul, Gutte joined Atlético Mineiro's youth setup in 2023, after having previously played for Grêmio. In May 2025, he signed his first professional contract with Galo.

Gutte made his first team – and Série A – debut on 4 November 2026, coming on as a second-half substitute for Tomás Pérez in a 1–0 away loss to Botafogo.

== International career ==
On 31 July 2023, Gutte was called up to the Brazil national under-15 team for friendlies.

== Career statistics ==
As of 8 November 2026

Club	Season	League			State League		Cup		Continental		Other		Total	
Club	Season	Division	Apps	Goals	Apps	Goals	Apps	Goals	Apps	Goals	Apps	Goals	Apps	Goals
Atlético Mineiro	2026	Série A	1	0	—		0	0	0	0	—		1	0
Career total			1	0	0	0	0	0	0	0	0	0	1	0
