= Gabriel Veneno =

Brazilian footballer (born 2009)

Personal information
- Full name: João Gabriel Castro Santos
- Date of birth: 16 July 2009 (age 17)
- Place of birth: Ilhéus, Brazil
- Height: 1.72 m (5 ft 8 in)
- Position: Winger

Team information
- Current team: Atlético Mineiro
- Number: 59

Youth career
- Vitória
- 2020–2022: Santos
- 2023–: Atlético Mineiro

Senior career*
Years	Team	Apps	(Gls)
2026–	Atlético Mineiro	1	(0)
- * Club domestic league appearances and goals as of 5 Novermber 2026

João Gabriel Castro Santos (born 16 July 2009), known as Gabriel Veneno, is a Brazilian professional footballer who plays as a winger for Campeonato Brasileiro Série A club Atlético Mineiro.

== Early life ==
Born in Ilhéus, Bahia, Gabriel was bitten by a snake at the age of three, which resulted in the partial amputation of the ring finger on his right hand. After learning about the snake incident, the director of Santos' academy gave the player the nickname "Veneno" (Portuguese for "poison"). Since then, the footballer has played under the name "Gabriel Veneno".

== Club career ==
Veneno started his career with a social project named Canarinhos, and later represented Vitória and Santos, but left the latter in 2022 and joined the youth academy of Atlético Mineiro in the following year. Dubbed the "new Neymar", he signed his first professional contract with the latter club until 2028 in July 2025.

On 4 November 2026, Veneno made his Campeonato Brasileiro Série A debut, coming on as a substitute for Mamady Cissé in a match against Botafogo.
