= Iván Román =

Chilean footballer (born 2006)

Personal information
- Full name: Iván Ramiro Román Hurtado
- Date of birth: 12 July 2006 (age 20)
- Place of birth: Santiago, Chile
- Height: 1.83 m (6 ft 0 in)
- Position: Centre-back

Team information
- Current team: Colo-Colo (on loan from Atlético Mineiro)
- Number: 17

Youth career
- 2010–2023: Palestino
- 2025: Atlético Mineiro

Senior career*
Years	Team	Apps	(Gls)
2023–2025	Palestino	27	(1)
2025–	Atlético Mineiro	19	(1)
2026–	→ Colo-Colo (loan)	5	(0)

International career^{‡}
2023	Chile U17	7	(0)
2024–2025	Chile U20	11	(1)
2025–	Chile	7	(0)
- * Club domestic league appearances and goals as of 13 September 2026 ‡ National team caps and goals as of 29 September 2026

Iván Ramiro Román Hurtado (born 12 July 2006) is a Chilean professional footballer who plays as a centre-back for Liga de Primera club Colo-Colo, on loan from Atlético Mineiro, and the Chile national team.

== Club career ==
Román is a youth product of the Chilean club Palestino since the age of 4, and spent his entire youth with them. He made his senior and professional debut with Palestino in a 1–1 Chilean Primera División tie with Audax Italiano on 21 January 2023. On 17 March 2023, he signed his first professional contract with the club. On 27 February 2024, he scored in a 2–1 Copa Libertadores win over Portuguesa, and at 17 years and 230 days was the youngest ever Chilean goalscorer in the competition.

On 28 February 2025, Román joined Brazilian club Atlético Mineiro on a contract running until December 2029. He made his debut for the club on 13 April, starting in a 2–2 league draw to Vitória.

On 8 August 2026, Román joined Colo-Colo on loan until June 2027 with an option for an additional six-months extension.

== International career ==
Román has represented Chile at under-17 level. In 2023 he participated in the 2023 South American U-17 Championship.

At senior level, Román received his first call-up to the Chile national team for the 2026 FIFA World Cup qualification matches against Argentina and Bolivia in June 2025. He made his debut in a World Cup qualifier against Brazil on 4 September 2025, in which Chile was defeated 3–0.

== Career statistics ==
=== Club ===
As of 13 September 2026

Club	Season	League			State League		Cup		League Cup		Continental		Other		Total	
Club	Season	Division	Apps	Goals	Apps	Goals	Apps	Goals	Apps	Goals	Apps	Goals	Apps	Goals	Apps	Goals
Palestino	2023	Liga de Primera	2	0	—		—		0	0	—		—		2	0
Palestino	2024	Liga de Primera	24	1	—		3	0	—		12 (Note: Eight appearances and one goal in Copa Libertadores, four appearances and one goal in Copa Sudamericana)	2	—		39	3
Palestino	2025	Liga de Primera	1	0	—		0	0	—		—		—		1	0
Palestino	Total		27	1	—		3	0	—		12	2	—		42	3
Atlético Mineiro	2025	Série A	12	0	0	0	0	0	—		4 (Note: Appearance(s) in Copa Sudamericana)	0	0	0	16	0
Atlético Mineiro	2026	Série A	6	1	0	0	1	0	—		1	0	1 (Note: Appearance in Campeonato Mineiro)	0	9	1
Atlético Mineiro	Total		18	1	0	0	1	0	—		5	0	1	0	25	2
Colo-Colo (loan)	2026	Liga de Primera	5	0	—		1	0	0	0	—		—		6	0
Career total			50	2	0	0	5	0	0	0	17	2	1	0	73	4

=== International ===
As of 29 September 2026

Appearances and goals by national team and year
National team	Year	Apps	Goals
Chile	2025	3	0
Chile	2026	4	0
Total		7	0
