= Kauã Pascini =

Brazilian footballer

Personal information
- Full name: Kauã Pascini Resende
- Date of birth: 5 March 2008 (age 18)
- Place of birth: Vitória, Brazil
- Height: 1.72 m (5 ft 8 in)
- Position: Left-back

Team information
- Current team: Atlético Mineiro
- Number: 36

Youth career
- CTCE
- 2017–2021: Flamengo
- 2022–2025: Atlético Mineiro

Senior career*
Years	Team	Apps	(Gls)
2026–	Atlético Mineiro	6	(0)
- * Club domestic league appearances and goals as of 13:17, 4 May 2026 (UTC)

Kauã Pascini Resende (born 5 March 2008) is a Brazilian footballer who plays as a left-back for Atlético Mineiro.

== Club career ==
Born in Vitória, Espírito Santo, Pascini joined Atlético Mineiro's youth setup in 2022, after playing for Flamengo. In January 2026, he was promoted to the first team by head coach Jorge Sampaoli, and renewed his contract until 2030.

Pascini made his senior debut on 11 January 2026, starting in a 1–1 Campeonato Mineiro home draw against Betim.

== International career ==
On 16 August 2024, Pascini was called up to the Brazil national under-16 team for a period of trainings.

== Career statistics ==
As of 4 May 2026

Club	Season	League			State League		Cup		Continental		Other		Total	
Club	Season	Division	Apps	Goals	Apps	Goals	Apps	Goals	Apps	Goals	Apps	Goals	Apps	Goals
Atlético Mineiro	2026	Série A	3	0	3	0	0	0	2 (Note: Appearance(s) in Copa Sudamericana)	0	—		8	0
Career total			3	0	3	0	0	0	2	0	0	0	8	0
