= Vitão (footballer, born 2008) =

Brazilian footballer

Personal information
- Full name: Vitor Fernandes Chaves Teixeira
- Date of birth: 4 March 2008 (age 18)
- Place of birth: Belo Horizonte, Brazil
- Height: 1.94 m (6 ft 4 in)
- Position: Centre-back

Team information
- Current team: Atlético Mineiro
- Number: 40

Youth career
- 2020–2026: Atlético Mineiro

Senior career*
Years	Team	Apps	(Gls)
2026–	Atlético Mineiro	11	(1)

International career
2025	Brazil U17	6	(0)
- * Club domestic league appearances and goals as of 23:40, 8 November 2026 (UTC)

Vitor Fernandes Chaves Teixeira (born 4 March 2008), known as Vitor Fernandes or just Vitão, is a Brazilian footballer who plays as a centre-back for Atlético Mineiro.

== Club career ==
Born in Belo Horizonte, Minas Gerais, Vitão joined Atlético Mineiro's youth setup in 2020, aged 12, and signed his first professional contract in April 2024. In September 2025, he renewed his link with the club until 2028.

Vitão made his senior debut with Galo on 11 January 2026, starting in a 1–1 Campeonato Mineiro home draw against Betim. On 12 September, he scored his first goal in professional career, in a 3–1 Série A home win over Fluminense.

== International career ==
On 10 February 2025, Vitão was called up to the Brazil national under-17 team for friendlies. He was also a part of the squad which played in the 2025 South American U-17 Championship and the 2025 FIFA U-17 World Cup, winning the former competition.

== Career statistics ==
As of 8 November 2026

Club	Season	League			State League		Cup		Continental		Other		Total	
Club	Season	Division	Apps	Goals	Apps	Goals	Apps	Goals	Apps	Goals	Apps	Goals	Apps	Goals
Atlético Mineiro	2026	Série A	9	1	2	0	3	0	4 (Note: Appearance(s) in Copa Sudamericana)	0	—		18	1
Career total			9	0	2	0	3	0	4	0	0	0	18	1
