= O Dia do Galo =

2014 film directed by Cris Azzi

- Directed by: Cris Azzi; Luiz Felipe Fernandes
- Produced by: Carlos Paulino; Marcela Jacques
- Edited by: Natacha Vassou
- Production companies: Alicate; Delícia Filmes; Nitro Imagens
- Distributed by: Delícia Filmes
- Release dates: 3 June 2014 (Cinefoot); 24 July 2015 (Theatrical release)
- Running time: 57 minutes
- Country: Brazil
- Language: Portuguese
- Budget: R$5,000 (est.)

O Dia do Galo ("The Day of Galo") is a 2014 Brazilian documentary film about the 2013 Copa Libertadores Finals. The film follows five supporters of Brazilian football club Atlético Mineiro in the day of the final match of the competition. It was released in Brazilian theatres on 24 July 2015.

== Synopsis ==
Shot in Belo Horizonte, the city in which Clube Atlético Mineiro is based and the venue of the 2013 Copa Libertadores Finals, the documentary follows five supporters of the club (a priest, a bar owner, a sports broadcaster, a musician and a retired worker) in their preparations for the final match of the competition, which Atlético went on to win in dramatic fashion.

== Production and release ==
O Dia do Galo was directed by Cris Azzi with support from Coletivo Nitro and Alicate Filmes, totalling a crew of 50 people. It was initially released as a 22-minute short film and made available online, on YouTube, as a way to encourage club players and supporters in their preparation for the 2013 FIFA Club World Cup. In 2014, the documentary version was completed and screened in festivals, and it was released in Brazilian movie theatres on 24 July 2015 (exactly two years after the day it portrays). It was made available on Netflix in December 2015.

== Reception ==
The documentary was generally met with positive reviews. Pablo Villaça, film critic for Cinema em Cena, gave the film 4 stars out of 5, stating "it is less about Atlético itself than about the act of rooting [for a football team]". The film ended 2015 as one of the most watched Brazilian films of the year.

== Awards ==
- Popular Jury Award – Mostra de Cinema de Tiradentes
- Cinefoot Belo Horizonte 2014

== See also ==
- 2013 Copa Libertadores Finals
