= Thiago Borbas =

Uruguayan footballer (born 2002)

Personal information
- Full name: Thiago Nicolás Borbas Silva
- Date of birth: 7 April 2002 (age 24)
- Place of birth: Montevideo, Uruguay
- Height: 1.81 m (5 ft 11 in)
- Position: Forward

Team information
- Current team: Atlético Mineiro (on loan from Red Bull Bragantino)
- Number: 18

Youth career
- Club Zorzal
- River Plate Montevideo

Senior career*
Years	Team	Apps	(Gls)
2020–2022	River Plate Montevideo	84	(28)
2023–	Red Bull Bragantino	104	(17)
2026	→ Oviedo (loan)	12	(0)
2026–	→ Atlético Mineiro (loan)	6	(2)

International career
2023	Uruguay	2	(0)
- * Club domestic league appearances and goals as of 17 October 2026

Thiago Nicolás Borbas Silva (born 7 April 2002) is a Uruguayan professional footballer who plays as a forward for Brazilian club Atlético Mineiro, on loan from Red Bull Bragantino.

== Club career ==
Borbas started his youth career with Club Zorzal, after which he joined River Plate Montevideo. He made his professional debut for River Plate on 5 September 2020 in a 2–0 league win against Montevideo Wanderers. He scored his first goal on 10 October 2020 in a 2–1 win against Progreso.

On 30 November 2022, Brazilian club Red Bull Bragantino announced the signing of Borbas on a five-year deal until December 2027. On 2 January 2026, he was loaned to La Liga side Real Oviedo until June.

On 30 July 2026, Borbas joined Atlético Mineiro on loan until the end of the season. A month later, on 29 August, he scored his first goal for the club in a 2–1 win over Vitória.

== International career ==
Borbas was named to multiple Uruguay under-20 training camps in 2020. On 21 October 2022, he was named in Uruguay's 55-man preliminary squad for the 2022 FIFA World Cup. However, he was not included in the final squad, which was announced three weeks later.

In June 2023, Borbas received his first call-up to the senior team for friendly matches against Nicaragua and Cuba. He made his debut on 14 June by coming on as a 59th minute substitute for Matías Arezo in a 4–1 win against Nicaragua.

== Career statistics ==
=== Club ===
As of match played 23 May 2026

Appearances and goals by club, season and competition
Club	Season	League			State league (Note: Includes Campeonato Paulista)		National cup (Note: Includes Copa Uruguay, Copa do Brasil)		Continental		Total	
Club	Season	Division	Apps	Goals	Apps	Goals	Apps	Goals	Apps	Goals	Apps	Goals
River Plate Montevideo	2020	Liga AUF Uruguaya	18	3	—		—		2 (Note: Appearances in Copa Sudamericana)	0	20	3
River Plate Montevideo	2021	Liga AUF Uruguaya	30	7	—		—		—		30	7
River Plate Montevideo	2022	Liga AUF Uruguaya	36	18	—		0	0	8	1	44	19
River Plate Montevideo	Total		84	28	0	0	0	0	10	1	94	29
Red Bull Bragantino	2023	Série A	33	9	9	2	1	0	7	2	50	13
Red Bull Bragantino	2024	Série A	21	2	13	3	4	2	14 (Note: Four appearances in Copa Libertadores; ten appearances, four goals in Copa Sudamericana)	4	52	11
Red Bull Bragantino	2025	Série A	19	1	9	0	4	2	—		32	3
Red Bull Bragantino	Total		73	12	31	5	9	4	21	6	134	27
Oviedo (loan)	2025–26	La Liga	12	0	—		—		—		12	0
Atlético Mineiro (loan)	2026	Série A	0	0	—		0	0	0	0	0	0
Career total			169	40	31	5	9	4	31	7	240	56

=== International ===
As of 20 June 2023

Appearances and goals by national team and year
National team	Year	Apps	Goals
Uruguay	2023	2	0
Total		2	0

== Honours ==
Individual

- Uruguayan Primera División Young Player of the Year: 2022
- Uruguayan Primera División Team of the Year: 2022
- Uruguayan Primera División top scorer: 2022
