= Victor Hugo (footballer, born 11 May 2004) =

Brazilian footballer

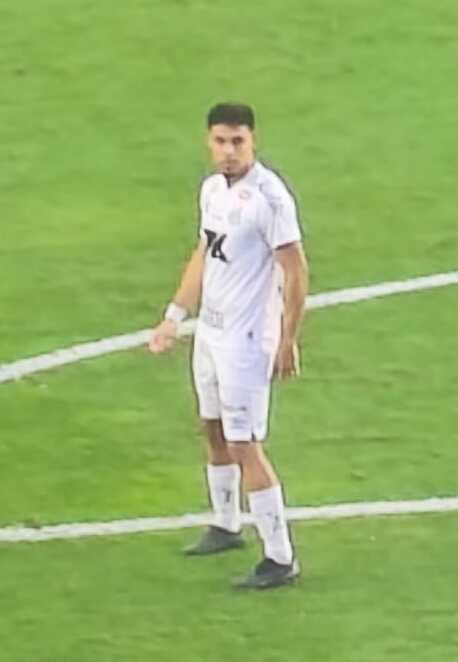
- Victor Hugo playing for Santos in 2025

Personal information
- Full name: Victor Hugo Gomes Silva
- Date of birth: 11 May 2004 (age 22)
- Place of birth: Rio de Janeiro, Brazil
- Height: 1.82 m (6 ft 0 in)
- Position: Midfielder

Team information
- Current team: Atlético Mineiro
- Number: 30

Youth career
- Madureira (futsal)
- Marabu Futsal
- Vasco da Gama
- 2016–2022: Flamengo

Senior career*
Years	Team	Apps	(Gls)
2022–2026	Flamengo	73	(3)
2024–2025	→ Göztepe (loan)	29	(2)
2025–2026	→ Santos (loan)	9	(0)
2026–	Atlético Mineiro	18	(4)

International career
2018–2019	Brazil U15		
2020–2021	Brazil U17		
2022	Brazil U20	2	(0)
- * Club domestic league appearances and goals as of 7 April 2026

Victor Hugo Gomes Silva (born 11 May 2004), known as Victor Hugo, is a Brazilian professional footballer who plays as a midfielder for Campeonato Brasileiro Série A club Atlético Mineiro.

== Club career ==
=== Early career ===
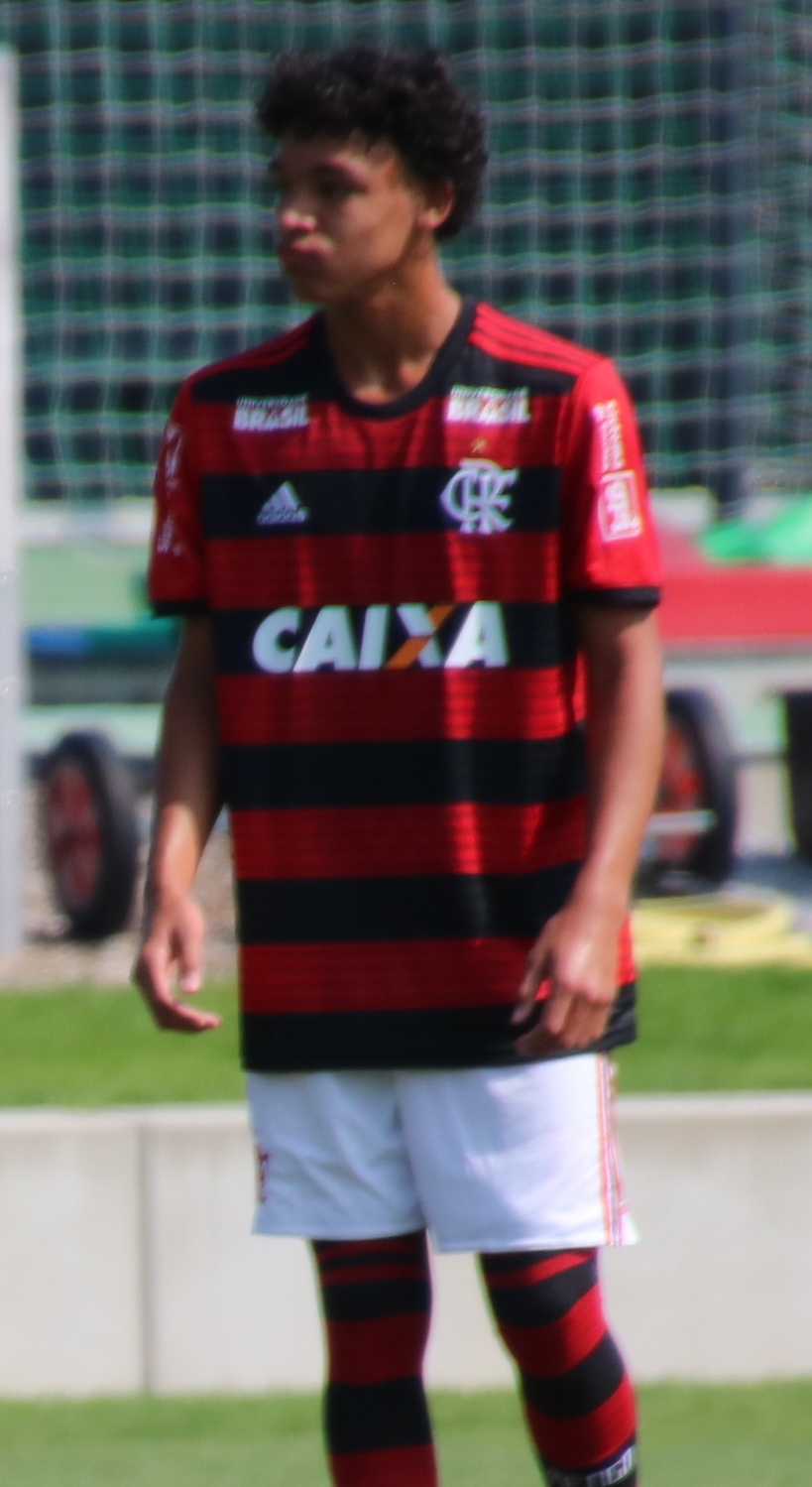
Victor Hugo playing for the under-15 team of Flamengo in 2018

Born in Bento Ribeiro, a neighborhood in Rio de Janeiro, Victor Hugo began his career in the futsal team of Madureira at the age of six. He subsequently played for Marabu Futsal and Vasco da Gama before joining Flamengo's youth sides in 2017; often deployed as a left-back in his previous clubs, he moved to a midfield position at Fla.

=== Flamengo ===
On 7 August 2020, Victor Hugo signed his first professional contract with Flamengo, agreeing to a deal until 2025. He made his first team debut on 1 May 2022, coming a 69th-minute substitute for Marinho in a 2–1 away win over Altos, for the year's Copa do Brasil.

On 4 May 2022, Victor Hugo played his debut game in the Copa Libertadores, replacing Bruno Henrique in a 2–2 draw against Talleres; aged 17 years, 11 months and 24 days, he became the fifth-youngest to debut for the club in the competition. Seven days later, on the day of his 18th birthday, he scored his first professional goal in a 2–0 win over Altos.

Victor Hugo subsequently moved to a central midfield role under head coach Dorival Júnior, and further extended his link until 2027 on 14 July 2022. In the 2023 season, he was regularly used by head coach Jorge Sampaoli during the year, and agreed to a new deal until December 2028 on 16 January 2024.

Victor Hugo played his 100th match for Flamengo on 22 May 2024, after coming on as a late substitute in a 1–0 away win over Amazonas, also for the national cup.

==== Loan to Göztepe ====
On 28 August 2024, Victor Hugo moved to Süper Lig club Göztepe on a one-year loan deal, as part of Carlos Alcaraz's move from Southampton to Flamengo. He made his debut abroad on 23 September, replacing compatriot Rômulo late into a 3–0 home win over Kayserispor.

Despite being regularly used, Victor Hugo was unable to establish himself in the starting eleven, and ended the season with three goals in 35 appearances overall.

==== Return to Flamengo ====
Upon returning, Victor Hugo was close to a permanent move to Famalicão, but the deal later collapsed and he returned to training with Flamengo in July 2025. Only a backup option to head coach Filipe Luís, he only featured in a match against Ceará on 3 August.

==== Loan to Santos ====
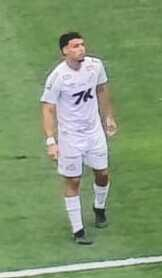
Victor Hugo in action for Santos in 2025

On 2 September 2025, Victor Hugo was announced at Santos on loan until July of the following year. He made his club debut twelve days later, starting in a 1–1 away draw against Atlético Mineiro.

=== Atlético Mineiro ===
On 18 January 2026, Atlético Mineiro announced the signing of Victor Hugo on a five-year contract.

== International career ==
Victor Hugo represented Brazil at under-15, under-17 and under-20 levels. On 8 December 2022, he was called up with the latter side for the 2023 South American U-20 Championship, but was cut from the final squad after being denied permission by Flamengo.

== Career statistics ==
As of 25 November 2025

Appearances and goals by club, season and competition
Club	Season	League			State league (Note: Includes Campeonato Carioca)		Cup (Note: Includes Copa do Brasil, Turkish Cup)		Continental		Other		Total	
Club	Season	Division	Apps	Goals	Apps	Goals	Apps	Goals	Apps	Goals	Apps	Goals	Apps	Goals
Flamengo	2022	Série A	21	2	0	0	8	0	8 (Note: Appearances in Copa Libertadores)	0	—		37	3
Flamengo	2023	Série A	30	1	2	0	8	0	6	2	—		46	3
Flamengo	2024	Série A	10	0	9	0	1	0	2	0	—		22	0
Flamengo	2025	Série A	1	0	—		0	0	—		—		1	0
Flamengo	Total		62	3	11	0	17	0	16	2	0	0	106	6
Göztepe (loan)	2024–25	Süper Lig	29	2	—		6	1	—		—		35	3
Santos (loan)	2025	Série A	9	0	—		—		—		—		9	0
Atlético Mineiro	2026	Série A	0	0	0	0	0	0	0	0	—		0	0
Career total			100	5	11	0	23	1	16	2	0	0	150	9

== Honours ==
Flamengo

- Copa Libertadores: 2022
- Copa do Brasil: 2022
- Campeonato Carioca: 2024
