= JP Iseppe =

Brazilian footballer (born 2001)

Personal information
- Full name: João Pedro de Souza Iseppe
- Date of birth: 24 March 2001 (age 25)
- Place of birth: Pirassununga, Brazil
- Height: 1.82 m (6 ft 0 in)
- Position: Midfielder

Team information
- Current team: Naxxar Lions

Youth career
- 2013–2014: União São João
- 2016–2022: São Paulo
- 2022: → Cuiabá (loan)

Senior career*
Years	Team	Apps	(Gls)
2023	Velo Clube	5	(0)
2023	União São João	0	(0)
2024–2025	Figueirense	20	(1)
2025	Botafogo-PB	9	(1)
2026–	Naxxar Lions	13	(0)
- * Club domestic league appearances and goals as of 7 May 2026

João Pedro de Souza Iseppe (born 24 March 2001), simply known as JP Iseppe, is a Brazilian professional footballer who plays as a midfielder for Maltese Premier League club Naxxar Lions.

== Career ==
JP Iseppe began his career in the youth sector of União São João, but spent most of his time in the academy at São Paulo FC. In 2022, he was loaned to Cuiabá, where he was part of the squad that won the 2022 Campeonato Brasileiro Sub-23. The following season, he made his professional football debut, playing for Velo Clube in Campeonato Paulista Série A2 and for União São João in the Copa Paulista.

In February 2025, Iseppe was bought by Botafogo-PB, where he quickly stood out due to a goal scored against Treze.

== Personal life ==
JP Iseppe has Italian citizenship, and his brother Mateus Iseppe is also a football player.

== Honours ==
Cuiabá

- Campeonato Brasileiro Sub-23: 2022
