= Mamady Cissé =

Guinean footballer

Personal information
- Date of birth: 1 January 2007 (age 19)
- Place of birth: Conakry, Guinea
- Height: 1.84 m (6 ft 0 in)
- Position: Midfielder

Team information
- Current team: Atlético Mineiro
- Number: 39

Youth career
- 36 Lion FC
- 2025–: Atlético Mineiro

Senior career*
Years	Team	Apps	(Gls)
2026–	Atlético Mineiro	11	(1)

International career^{‡}
2026–	Guinea	2	(1)
- * Club domestic league appearances and goals as of 19:34, 19 May 2026 (UTC) ‡ National team caps and goals as of 21:50, 17 August 2026 (UTC)

Mamady Cissé (born 1 January 2007) is a Guinean footballer who plays as a midfielder for Campeonato Brasileiro Série A club Atlético Mineiro and the Guinea national team.

== Club career ==
Born in Conakry, Cissé joined Atlético Mineiro's youth setup in May 2025, from Nigerian side 36 Lion FC, and began training with the first team less than a month after arriving. He made his senior debut on 14 January of the following year, coming on as a late substitute for Rony in a 1–1 Campeonato Mineiro away draw against North; he became the second African player to appear with the club, only behind David Adjei in 1997.

Cissé made his Série A debut on 4 February 2026, replacing Maycon late into a 1–0 away loss to Red Bull Bragantino, and was handed his first start three days later, in a 1–1 home draw against Athletic-MG. He scored his first professional goal on 16 May, in a 3–1 home win over Mirassol.

== International career ==
Cissé made his debut for the Guinea national team on 27 March 2026, scoring the first goal and providing two assists in a friendly with Togo that ended in a 2–2 draw.

== Career statistics ==
=== Club ===
As of 19 May 2026

Club	Season	League			State League		Cup		Continental		Other		Total	
Club	Season	Division	Apps	Goals	Apps	Goals	Apps	Goals	Apps	Goals	Apps	Goals	Apps	Goals
Atlético Mineiro	2026	Série A	6	1	5	0	1	0	1 (Note: Appearance(s) in Copa Sudamericana)	0	—		13	1
Career total			6	1	5	0	1	0	1	0	0	0	13	1

=== International ===
Appearances and goals by national team and year
National team	Year	Apps	Goals
Guinea	2026	2	0
Total		2	0
