= Mateus Iseppe =

Brazilian footballer

Personal information
- Full name: Mateus José Iseppe
- Date of birth: 2 May 2006 (age 20)
- Place of birth: Pirassununga, Brazil
- Height: 1.78 m (5 ft 10 in)
- Position: Attacking midfielder

Team information
- Current team: Nacional (on loan from Atlético Mineiro)

Youth career
- Velo Clube
- 2017: Santos
- 2018: Francana
- 2019–2021: Velo Clube
- 2022–2025: Atlético Mineiro

Senior career*
Years	Team	Apps	(Gls)
2025–	Atlético Mineiro	3	(0)
2026–	→ Nacional (loan)	0	(0)
- * Club domestic league appearances and goals as of 7 April 2026

Mateus José Iseppe (born 2 May 2006) is a Brazilian footballer who plays as an attacking midfielder for Primeira Liga club Nacional, on loan from Atlético Mineiro.

== Career ==
Born in Pirassununga, São Paulo, Iseppe joined Atlético Mineiro's youth setup in 2022, from Velo Clube. On 4 August 2023, he renewed his contract with the club until July 2026, and further extended his link until December 2028 on 23 October.

In January 2025, Iseppe was promoted to the first team by head coach Cuca, but was cut from the Campeonato Mineiro debut after having variations in his pre-match cardiological exams. He returned to training in May, and played for the under-20s to regain match fitness.

Iseppe made his first team – and Série A – debut on 24 August 2025, coming on as a late substitute for Gabriel Menino in a 2–0 away loss to São Paulo.

== Personal life ==
Iseppe comes from a family of footballers: his father Marcelo and his older brothers Leonardo and João Pedro are all also midfielders.

== Career statistics ==
As of 26 August 2025

Club	Season	League			State League		Cup		Continental		Other		Total	
Club	Season	Division	Apps	Goals	Apps	Goals	Apps	Goals	Apps	Goals	Apps	Goals	Apps	Goals
Atlético Mineiro	2025	Série A	1	0	0	0	0	0	0	0	—		1	0
Career total			1	0	0	0	0	0	0	0	0	0	1	0
