= Clube Atlético Mineiro =

Association football club in Belo Horizonte, Brazil

Atlético Mineiro
- Full name: Clube Atlético Mineiro
- Nickname: Galo (Rooster)
- Short name: Atlético-MG; CAM
- Founded: 25 March 1908; 118 years ago (as Athletico Mineiro Foot-Ball Club)
- Ground: Arena MRV
- Capacity: 46,000
- SAF Owner: Galo Holding (75%)
- President: Sérgio Coelho
- Head coach: Eduardo Domínguez
- League: Campeonato Brasileiro Série A Campeonato Mineiro
- 2025 2025: Série A, 11th of 20; Mineiro, 1st of 12 (champions)
- Website: atletico.com.br
Home colours	Away colours	Third colours

The Clube Atlético Mineiro (Portuguese pronunciation: [ˈklubi ɐˈtlɛtʃiku miˈne(j)ɾu]), commonly known as Atlético Mineiro and colloquially as Galo (pronounced [ˈgalu], "Rooster"), is a professional association football club in Belo Horizonte, the capital city of the Brazilian state of Minas Gerais. They compete in the Campeonato Brasileiro Série A, the first level of Brazilian football.

The Clube Atlético Mineiro was founded on 25 March 1908 by twenty-two students from Belo Horizonte. Despite having upper-class founders, the club immediately opened its doors to players of every social class. The club's mascot, the rooster, has been strongly associated with Atlético since its introduction in the 1930s. Over the years, the word Galo (Portuguese for "rooster") became a common nickname for the club itself. The team's regular home kit comprises black-and-white striped shirts, black shorts and white socks.

Atlético has won the Campeonato Mineiro a record 50 times. At the national level, the club has won the Campeonato Brasileiro three times, in 1937, 1971 and 2021 and finished second on five occasions. It has also won Copa do Brasil twice and the Supercopa do Brasil and the Copa dos Campeões Brasileiros once each. In international club football, Atlético has won the Copa Libertadores and the Recopa Sudamericana once each, and a record two Copa CONMEBOL; the team has also reached three other continental finals. The club has also competed in other sports throughout its history, with the futsal department becoming especially notable.

The club plays its home games at the Arena MRV, which has an operational capacity of over 46,000 spectators. Arena MRV's construction began on 20 April 2020, its inauguration was on 15 April 2023, and its first official match took place on 27 August 2023. Atlético holds a strong local rivalry with Cruzeiro, called the Clássico Mineiro. The club also holds a local rivalry with América Mineiro and an interstate one with Flamengo. Atlético has the fourth most valuable brand in Brazil, worth R$3.373 billion (€516.74 million) as of 2025, the 8th largest football crowd in Brazil and ranks seventh in the country in terms of turnover, generating R$657 million (€100.6 million) in 2024.

On 1 November 2023, it was announced that Galo Holding completed the purchase of controlling interest (75%) of the club's SAF. Of a total of 913 million reais paid by new investors, a third of the amount was used to pay debts.

== History ==
=== Early years and achievements (1908–1949) ===
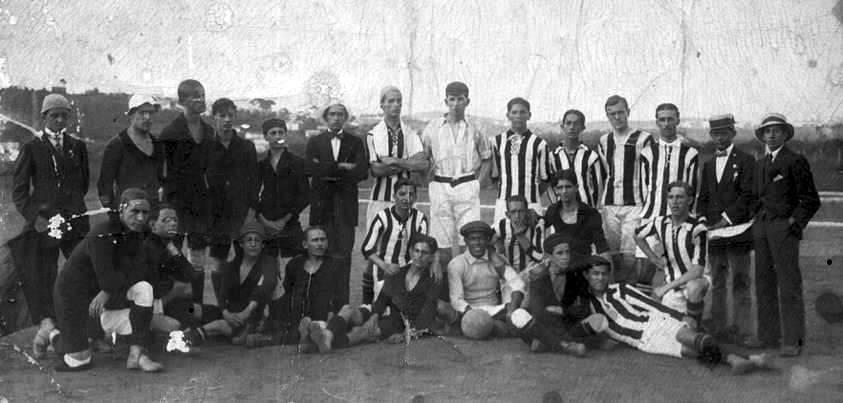
The Atlético Mineiro team that won the Taça Bueno Brandão in 1914, the club's first trophy

Clube Atlético Mineiro was formed on 25 March 1908, by a group of twenty-two students from Belo Horizonte, who decided the club's name would be Athletico Mineiro Foot Ball Club. The club's first match was played against Sport Club Futebol on 21 March 1909; Atlético won 3–0, with the first goal scored by Aníbal Machado. In 1913, the club's name was officially changed to Clube Atlético Mineiro, and in the following year Atlético won the Taça Bueno Brandão, the first competition ever held in the state of Minas Gerais. In 1915, the club won the inaugural edition of the Campeonato Mineiro, the state league of Minas Gerais. The competition was then organised by the Liga Mineira de Sports Athléticos, which would later become the Federação Mineira de Futebol (FMF).

Atlético won the league again in 1926, led by striker Mário de Castro. In 1927, forwards Said and Jairo joined Castro to form an attacking partnership nicknamed the Trio Maldito ("Unholy Trio"), which guided Atlético to another state league triumph. In 1929, the club played its first international encounter, against Portuguese club Vitória de Setúbal, winning 3–1 in a match played at the Presidente Antônio Carlos Stadium. The ground had opened earlier that year and would become the club's home for the following two decades.

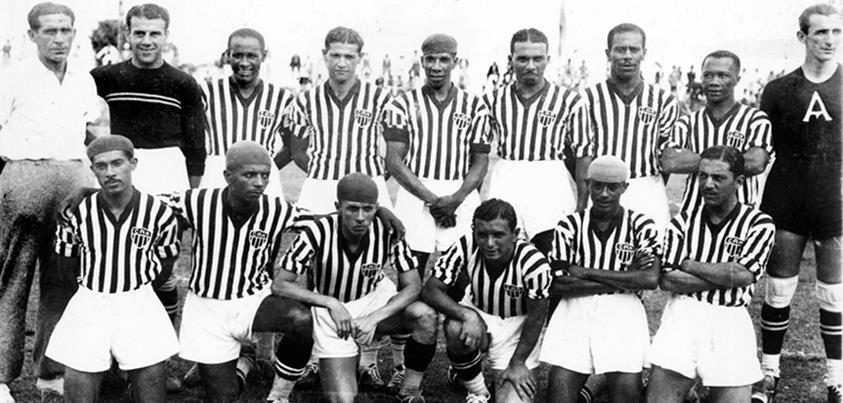
The 1937 Campeonato Brasileiro winning squad

Atlético won the state league in 1931 and 1932, before becoming a professional club in 1933. After another Campeonato Mineiro triumph in 1936, Atlético won the 1937 Campeonato Brasileiro, the inaugural edition of the national league. The competition was organised by the Federação Brasileira de Foot-Ball, a federation for professional clubs that would later merge into the Brazilian Sports Confederation (CBD). The Copa dos Campeões Estaduais was contested by the 1936 state league champions from Minas Gerais (Atlético), Rio de Janeiro (Fluminense), São Paulo (Portuguesa) and Espírito Santo (Rio Branco). Atlético defeated the latter 5–1 in the final match, played at the Antônio Carlos stadium. Guará rose as the club's top player during that period, and the interstate title was followed by two more Campeonato Mineiro victories, in 1938 and 1939.

Success continued in the 1940s, with a squad that included Carlyle, Lucas Miranda, Nívio and goalkeeper Kafunga. The club was dominant in the state as it won the league in 1941, 1942, 1946, 1947 and 1949. Although América had been Atlético's long-standing adversary, a new rivalry started to develop with Cruzeiro in the 1940s, as it became Galo's main challenger during this period.

=== European tour and the Mineirão era (1950–1969) ===
In 1950, the club's home moved from the Antônio Carlos to the newer and larger Estádio Independência. The season saw another Campeonato Mineiro triumph and the club's first European tour, in which it played ten games in five countries. The excursion happened at a time when there were neither regular national competitions in Brazil nor continental ones in South America, and followed soon after the traumatic Maracanazo. The tour and Atlético's results, many of which achieved under adverse weather conditions and snow, were seen by national sports media as a historic achievement for Brazilian football itself. The team, captained by Zé do Monte, was dubbed the Campeões do Gelo ("Ice Champions"), a title that is remembered in the club's official anthem. The club's success in the state competition continued in the 1950s, a decade that saw the rise of forward Ubaldo and five consecutive Campeonato Mineiro victories from 1952 to 1956. After another state league title in 1958, Atlético took part in the inaugural edition of the Taça Brasil in the following year, reaching the third round. The tournament, the country's first annual nationwide competition, was a cup contested between state league champions, originally created by the CBD to select Brazil's entrants in the newly formed Copa Libertadores.

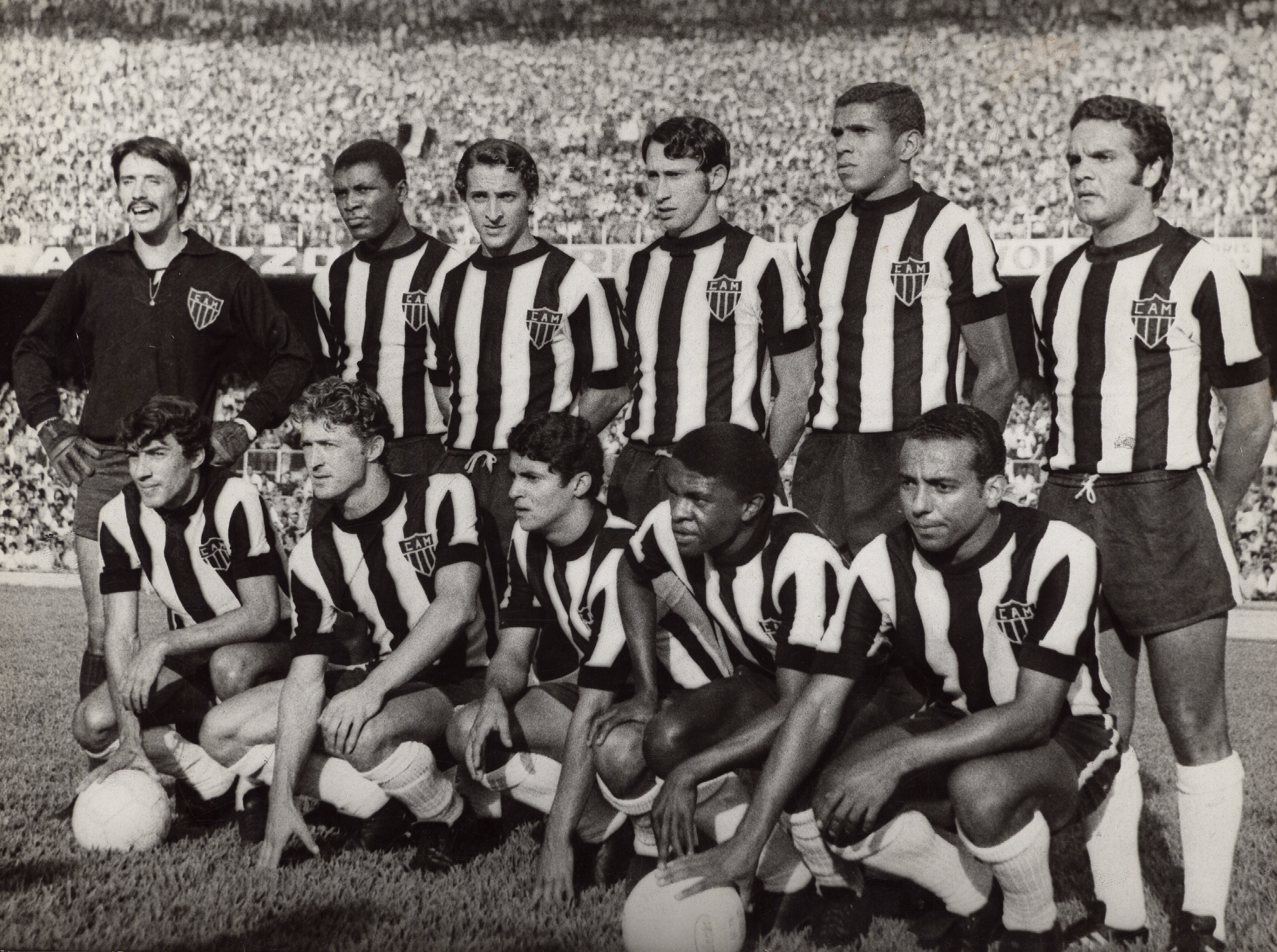
The Atlético Mineiro team, 1970.

In the 1960s, Atlético won the Campeonato Mineiro twice, in 1962 and 1963, but failed to advance to the later stages of the Taça Brasil. Mineirão, Belo Horizonte's new stadium, opened in 1965 and immediately became the club's home. It was in the mid-1960s when the rivalry with Cruzeiro became the main one in the state. In 1967, another national-level competition was created by the CBD, the Torneio Roberto Gomes Pedrosa. It included more clubs than the Taça Brasil, but Atlético did not finish in the top-four in any of its editions in the decade. In the second half of the 1960s, highlights came in the form of friendlies against national sides. In 1968, Atlético, representing the Brazilian national team, defeated European Championship runners-up Yugoslavia 3–2 at the Mineirão; the following year, the Seleção itself, which would become champions of the 1970 FIFA World Cup, was defeated 2–1.

=== National success and state dominance (1970–1989) ===
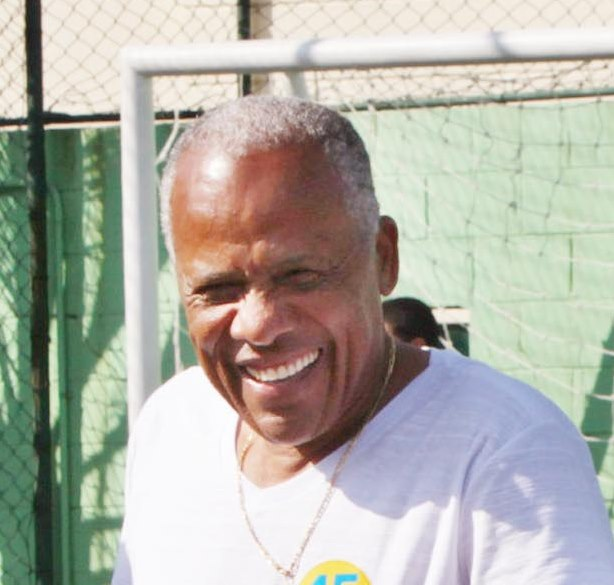
Dario (here pictured in 2014) was the top goalscorer and led Galo to triumph in the 1971 Brasileirão.

With the arrival of Telê Santana as the club's head coach in 1970, Galo broke Cruzeiro's sequence and won its first state league title in the Mineirão, also finishing third in the last Roberto Gomes Pedrosa. In 1971, captained by midfielder Oldair and with World Cup-winning forward Dario as the league's top goalscorer, Atlético won the Campeonato Brasileiro. It was the first edition of the competition, also known as the Brasileirão, which replaced both the Taça Brasil and the Roberto Gomes Pedrosa as the new national championship. Atlético played a final group stage against São Paulo and Botafogo, defeating the former 1–0 at the Mineirão and the latter 1–0 at the Maracanã. The victory also secured the club's first participation in an official continental competition, the 1972 Copa Libertadores, in which it did not advance past the first group stage. After four trophyless years, Atlético won the state league again in 1976 and finished third in the Campeonato Brasileiro. That season saw the emergence of a golden generation of players, formed in the club's youth academies under coach Barbatana. Reinaldo, Toninho Cerezo, Éder, Luizinho, Paulo Isidoro and João Leite, players who represented Brazil at international level, were central to the team that took Atlético to six consecutive state league victories between 1978 and 1983, and to good results in the Série A. Atlético came second in the 1977 Brasileirão, losing the final to São Paulo in a penalty shootout at the Mineirão, despite remaining undefeated for the entire season. Reinaldo, the league's top scorer in that season with an average of 1.56 goals per match, was banned from the final. By his account, this was because of his insistence on celebrating his goals by raising his fist, a political symbol that opposed the Brazilian military government of the time. In 1978, Atlético reached the Copa Libertadores semi-finals and won the Copa dos Campeões Brasileiros, a tournament organised by the CBD between past winners of the Brasileirão. In a repetition of the previous year's Brasileiro decisive match, the opponent in the final of this competition was São Paulo, with Atlético this time winning a penalty shootout.

In 1980, after having the best record in the first stages of the Brasileirão, Atlético lost to Flamengo in a controversial final of the competition. Three Galo players were bizarrely sent off, among them Reinaldo, who received a straight red card after scoring twice. The team was then eliminated from the following year's Copa Libertadores undefeated, in another decisive match marked by controversy: a play-off against Flamengo that ended after 37 minutes, following the sendings-off of five Atlético players. During the 1980s, the club participated in and won international friendly competitions, such as the Amsterdam Tournament and the Tournoi de Paris. Atlético had the best statistic league records of the 1980, 1983, 1985, 1986 and 1987 Brasileirão seasons, but did not win the title, falling in the finals or semi-finals of those editions. In the second half of the decade, the club continued its success in the state, winning the Campeonato Mineiro in 1985, 1986, 1988 and 1989. Atlético was one of Brazil's top sides of the 1980s, providing many players to the Brazilian national team, being dominant at state level and having good performances in the Brasileiro, but a tendency to lose in its final knockout stages prevented a new title in this competition.

=== Continental efforts and financial turmoil (1990–2009) ===
In the following decade, Atlético won the state league in 1991 and first saw success at continental level in 1992, when it won the inaugural Copa CONMEBOL. The team, managed by Procópio Cardoso, defeated Paraguay's Olimpia in the finals to claim its first official international title. As champion of that competition, the club took part in the 1993 Copa de Oro, in which it eliminated local rival Cruzeiro in the semi-finals but eventually lost to Argentina's Boca Juniors. After finishing fourth in the 1994 Brasileirão, the following year saw the club win the state league and reach the finals of the Copa CONMEBOL for a second time. This one ended in defeat to Argentine team Rosario Central on penalties, after Atlético won the first leg by 4–0 and lost the second one by the same score. In 1996, Atlético participated in the Copa Masters CONMEBOL, a competition between past winners of the Copa CONMEBOL that was played in Cuiabá; Atlético eliminated Rosario Central in the semi-finals but lost to São Paulo in the final match. The team also finished third in that year's Brasileiro and fourth in the following edition, falling in the semi-finals of both seasons. Another triumph came in the 1997 Copa CONMEBOL, when an Atlético team that included Marques and Cláudio Taffarel defeated Argentina's Lanús in the finals, and won the trophy for a second time. In 1999, after another Campeonato Mineiro title, a Galo side led by Marques and Guilherme, the top scorer in the league, reached the Série A finals for the fourth time, but lost to Corinthians. Despite international success and good performances in the Série A, the decade was marked by bad club administration by Atlético's presidents and deteriorating finances, which made the club one of the most indebted in Brazilian football.

In 2000, Atlético won the Campeonato Mineiro, reached the Copa Libertadores quarter-finals and the semi-finals of Copa Mercosur, but had a bad season in the national league, the Copa João Havelange. The following year, despite a good performance in the Brasileirão with a squad that included Marques, Guilherme and Gilberto Silva, the team was eliminated in the competition's semi-finals, eventually finishing in fourth place. Atlético then finished in the upper part of the national league table in the following two seasons, but in 2004 it barely escaped relegation. In 2005 the club was demoted to the Série B, the second level of the Brasileirão.

On the following year with Levir Culpi as head coach, the club won promotion at the first attempt as Série B champion in 2006, returning to the Série A for the 2007 season. That year, Atlético won the Campeonato Mineiro, its first trophy in seven years, and finished eighth in the national league. Alexandre Kalil was chosen as the club's new president in 2008, and tried to improve its finances and status. In 2009, with Diego Tardelli in good form, Galo led the Brasileirão for eight of the thirty-eight rounds, before eventually finishing in seventh place. Despite some highlights at the beginning and end of the decade, the 2000s were not a successful period in the club's history, again marked by bad administration and frequent managerial changes.

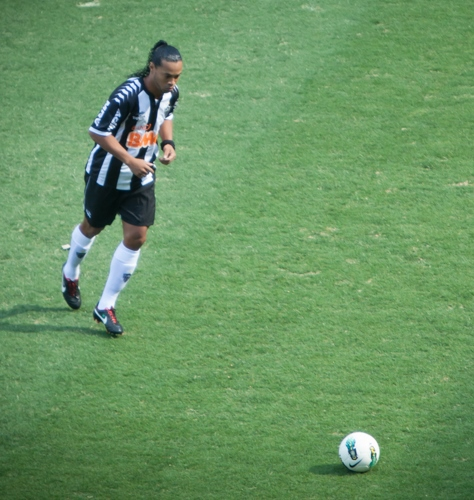
Ronaldinho played an important part in the club's resurgence after his arrival in 2012.

=== Resurgence and international success (2010-2017) ===
The team won its 40th Campeonato Mineiro in 2010, but finished 13th in the Série A. After an unsuccessful year in 2011, coming close to relegation, the arrival of Cuca as head coach at the end of that season marked the beginning of another successful era for the club. The club moved back to the Independência in 2012, as the Mineirão was closed for renovation, and won the Campeonato Mineiro undefeated. The arrival of Ronaldinho in the middle of the season was an important event for the club, which eventually finished as runner-up in the Série A and earned a spot in the following year's Copa Libertadores.

Diego Tardelli and Gilberto Silva returned to the club in 2013 and joined Ronaldinho, Jô and Bernard towards another Campeonato Mineiro triumph. The quarter-finals of that season's Copa Libertadores saw an iconic moment for Atlético, when a penalty kick was awarded to Mexican Club Tijuana in injury time. It would have meant elimination if it had been scored, but was saved by Atlético's goalkeeper Victor with his left foot. The save, according to sports commentators and fans, represented the "kicking out" of the club's historic "jinx". Atlético then defeated Argentina's Newell's Old Boys in the semi-finals and Olimpia in the finals, both on penalties, after losing both first legs by 2–0 and winning the second ones by the same score, to achieve its first Copa Libertadores title. The club's participation in the FIFA Club World Cup was unsuccessful, as Atlético failed to reach the final, losing to Moroccan hosts Raja Casablanca; Galo eventually finished in third place after defeating China's Guangzhou Evergrande.

Under Levir Culpi, who returned to the club in 2014, Atlético won its first Recopa Sudamericana, defeating Lanús for the second time in a continental final. In that season's Copa do Brasil, after trailing 0–3 on aggregate in both the quarter-finals and semi-finals (against Corinthians and Flamengo, respectively), Atlético made 4–3 comebacks and advanced. The competition's finals were the first at a national level to feature them and Atlético defeated Cruzeiro on both encounters to win its first Copa do Brasil. The club's successful run in the decade continued in 2015, when it won the Campeonato Mineiro and finished second in the Campeonato Brasileiro. In 2016, however, Atlético Mineiro ended the season without official trophies, finishing as runner-up of the Campeonato Mineiro and the Copa do Brasil, and in fourth place in the Brasileiro. The club achieved its 44th Campeonato Mineiro title in 2017.

=== New golden age (2021–) ===
On 2 December 2021, after finishing 3rd place in the last edition of the Campeonato Brasileiro, Atlético won its third Série A title after 49 years, beating Bahia in a thrilling 2–3 comeback to take the title. Less than two weeks later, on 15 December, they beat Athletico Paranaense in the 2021 Copa do Brasil Finals after a 4–0 win at home, the largest thrash ever in a Copa do Brasil finals match, followed by a 1–2 away win to secure Galo's second Copa do Brasil trophy. On 20 February 2022, after a 2–2 draw with Flamengo, Atlético Mineiro took the 2022 Supercopa do Brasil title after a long penalty shootout, in which Galo won 8–7. In 2024, Atlético won the Campeonato Mineiro, beating city rivals Cruzeiro with a 5–3 aggregate score, and also finished runners-up of the Copa do Brasil and Copa Libertadores. In 2025, Atlético won the 2025 Campeonato Mineiro for the sixth consecutive year (2020–2025) and the 50th title, a feat that was last achieved 42 years prior (1978–83), being the second in the club's history, and also finished runners-up at the Copa Sudamericana.

== Symbols and colours ==
The first crest used by Atlético Mineiro

=== Crest ===
The club's first emblem, introduced in the 1910s, consisted of a simple design of the three initials of the club's name ("CAM" for Clube Atlético Mineiro) in an oval shape in black. The first and most significant change occurred in 1922, when an edged shield format was adopted, with the letters in its upper part and black and white stripes in the lower. The crest's general appearance has been kept ever since, with only the exact format and the placement of the black and white stripes within the escutcheon changing over the decades. In the 1970s a golden star above the badge was introduced, alluding to the 1971 Série A title, which still remains. Red stars were featured on two occasions, referring to the 1978 Copa dos Campeões and the 1992 and 1997 Copa CONMEBOL victories, but these were removed in 1999.

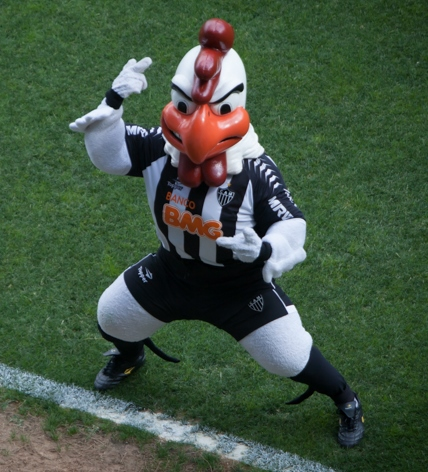
Galo Doido ("Crazy Rooster"), the club's stadium mascot

=== Mascot ===
Atlético's mascot, a rooster, is the best known in the country. According to Kafunga, who played as goalkeeper for the club from 1935 to 1955, the "rooster" nickname was associated with Atlético because of its kit colours. In 1945, Fernando Pierucetti, known as Mangabeira, a cartoonist for the A Folha de Minas newspaper, was selected to design mascots for each of the three biggest clubs in Belo Horizonte. According to Mangabeira, Atlético's would be the rooster because the team used to play with passion and would never give up until the end of each match, like gamecocks in cockfights.

Over the years, the word galo (Portuguese for "rooster") became a cheering chant for the supporters and a nickname by which they referred to the club, an appellation that eventually spread to other football fans in the country. The nickname was incorporated into the club's official anthem, composed by Vicente Motta in 1968, whose chorus hails Atlético as a "strong and avenging rooster". In 1976, a costumed rooster mascot was introduced, to accompany players and children in the match entrance. The stadium mascot was reintroduced with a new costume in 2005, named Galo Doido ("Crazy Rooster") by the supporters.

=== Kits ===
The club's home kit has always consisted of a black-and-white vertically striped shirt, with black shorts and white or black socks. The width of the black and white stripes has varied from season to season, as has the colour of the shirt numbers, which have usually been red, black, white or yellow. Atlético's traditional away kit is all-white shirts, shorts and socks, but has had slight variations. An all-black third kit was introduced in the 2000 season, being used again in 2015 and 2025. In 2008, a black-and-gold vertically striped third kit was launched to commemorate the club's centenary, featuring the first crest. Squad number 12 is retired from the club's kits, dedicated to the fans.

Since the 1981 season, the club has had its kits manufactured by sportswear corporations, the first one being Brazilian company Rainha. Since January 1st, 2026, Atlético's kits are manufactured by Nike, the first time that the American manufacturer created kits to a club from Minas Gerais. Other previous suppliers were Adidas (1983–85, 2022–2025), Penalty (1986–90, 1992–93 and 1997–2001), Dell'erba (1991), Umbro (1994–96 and 2002–04), Diadora (2005–07), Lotto (2008–09), Topper (2010–2012, 2017–2018), Lupo (2013), Puma (2014–2015), Dryworld (2016) and Le Coq Sportif (2019–2021).

In 1982, bank Credireal was Atlético's first shirt sponsor. After one sponsorless season in 1983, Precon, a construction company, appeared on the shirts in 1984 and 1985; it was replaced by Agrimisa bank in 1986. In 1987, Coca-Cola sponsored all participating clubs of Copa União, and the brand remained on Atlético's kits until 1994. The club was subsequently sponsored by TAM Airlines (1995–96), Tenda (1997–98), and had temporary deals with Fiat and Telemar in 1999. Two sponsorless years followed, before permanent deals were signed with Fiat (2002–03), MRV Engenharia (2004–07) and Fiat again in 2008. After one more season without a brand on the club's shirts, BMG, a bank that was owned by the former club president Ricardo Annes Guimarães, was the main sponsor from 2010 to 2014. MRV Engenharia returned as the club's main shirt sponsor in 2015, being replaced by state-owned bank Caixa Econômica Federal for three years, starting in 2016. BMG returned as the club's main shirt sponsor from 2019 to 2020. After BMG, Atlético signed with Betano for four years, starting in 2021. The current main sponsor is H2bet, a brazilian betting company, since January 2025.

== Grounds ==
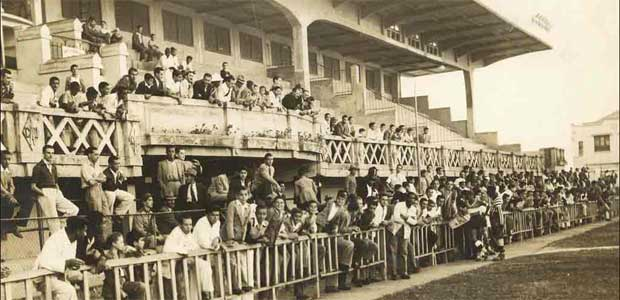
Estádio Presidente Antônio Carlos was Atlético Mineiro's home ground from 1929 to 1950.

Atlético had its first home ground built in 1912 at Paraopeba Avenue, in downtown Belo Horizonte, across the street from América's first stadium. The club's main ground for most of its early years, however, was the Presidente Antônio Carlos stadium, which held 5,000 people; it was nicknamed Estádio de Lourdes for the quarter in which it was located. The Antônio Carlos was one of the first stadiums in Brazil to feature floodlights, and opened on 30 May 1929 with a friendly against Corinthians, won by Atlético 4–2. The following year, the stadium was visited by FIFA president Jules Rimet, who watched a night game for the first time. The stadium fell out of favor when the larger Independência was built in 1950, and remained largely unused by the first team; eventually it was sold by the club to the Belo Horizonte municipality in the 1960s. After decades of legal disputes with the municipal government, the property returned to the club in 1991. It was leased to a shopping mall in 1995, which was built in the following year where the stadium once was, across the street from Atlético's administrative headquarters.

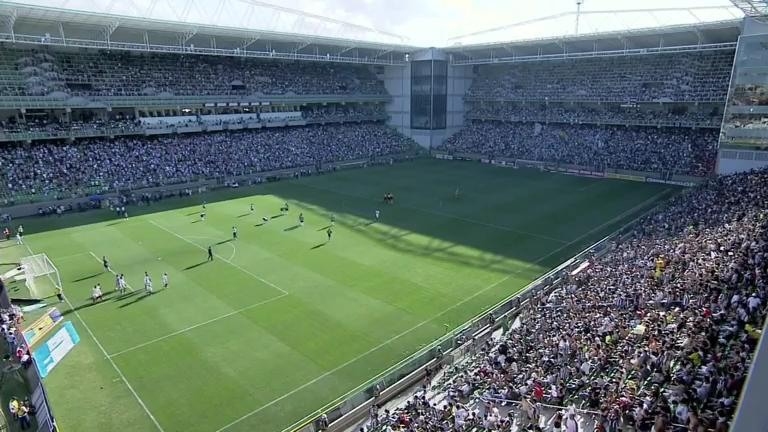
Independência, the club's first choice home stadium from 1950 to 1965, and from 2012 to 2019

Construction for the Independência (officially Estádio Raimundo Sampaio) started in 1947 in preparation for the 1950 FIFA World Cup, during which its first match was played. Originally the property of the State Government of Minas Gerais, ownership was transferred to Sete de Setembro FC in 1965, when the Mineirão was built, and the property passed to América in 1997, when it absorbed Sete de Setembro. Before the Mineirão, the stadium was the largest in Belo Horizonte – holding up to 30,000 people – and was preferred by Atlético over the older and smaller Antônio Carlos stadium. After the Mineirão's construction, however, Atlético did not use the Estádio do Horto (as it is also known) for decades, except for a brief spell in the late 1990s. The stadium was renovated in 2012, while the Mineirão was closed, having its capacity reduced to 23,018. In that year, Atlético announced a deal with BWA Arenas, the stadium manager. The club signed a contract to use the Independência as its home ground for 10 years, but moved back to the Mineirão in 2020.

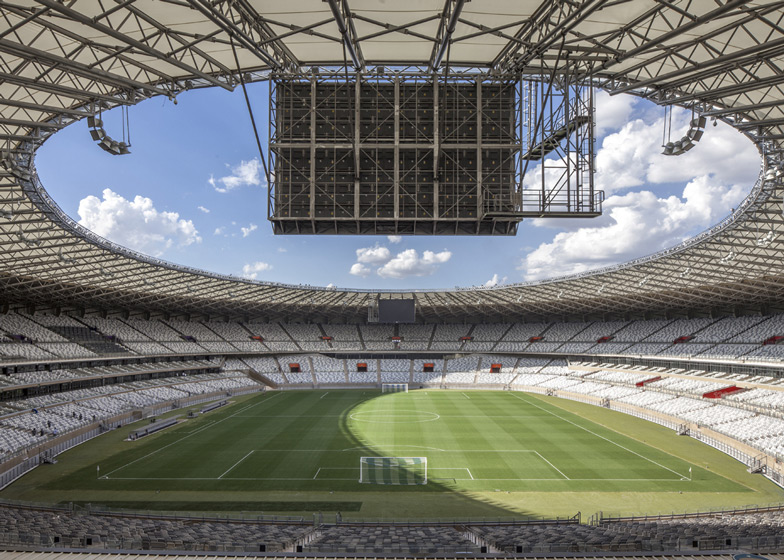
Mineirão, Atlético's ground for most of its history, was renovated for the 2014 FIFA World Cup.

Mineirão (officially Estádio Governador Magalhães Pinto) opened in 1965 and quickly became Galo's new home, as its peak capacity of over 100,000 spectators surpassed any other stadium in Belo Horizonte or in Minas Gerais. Property of the State of Minas Gerais, Mineirão was Atlético's home from its opening until its closure in 2010 for renovations prior to the 2014 FIFA World Cup. The club temporarily moved to Arena do Jacaré in Sete Lagoas and subsequently to Independência in 2012. Historically the club's home ground, Atlético's most important matches have all been played at the Mineirão. After the renovation, the Mineirão has an overall capacity of 61,846.

Arena MRV, the club's property, opened in 2023, has a peak capacity of 46,000 spectators, and is the most technological stadium in the country. The stadium is Atlético's home since August 2023, and is a multi-use Arena.

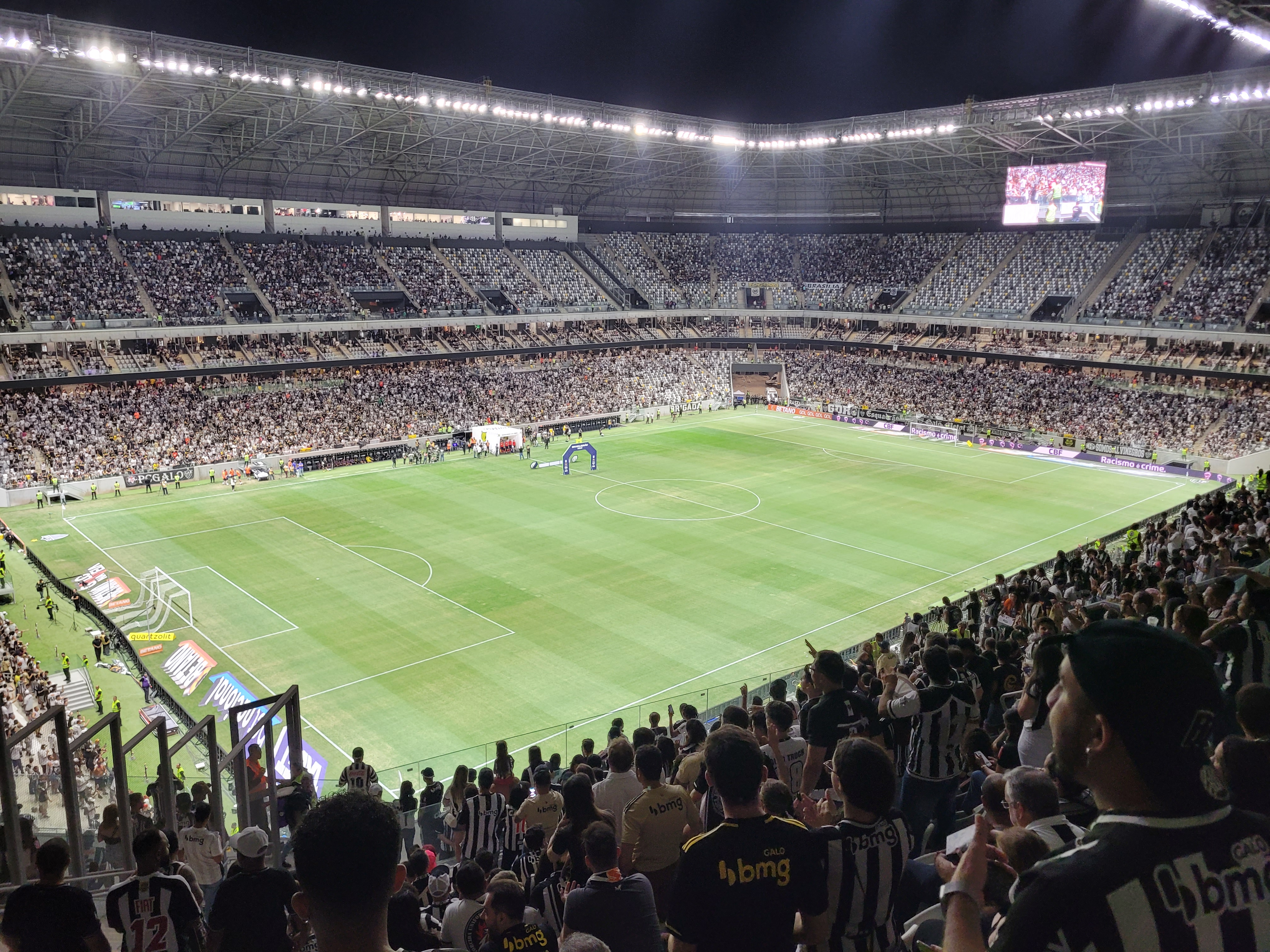
Arena MRV, the club's home ground since 2023.

Cidade do Galo ("Rooster City"), the club's main training facility since 2001, has been lauded as the best in Brazil and is considered one of the best in the world; it hosted the Argentina national football team at the 2014 FIFA World Cup. Other facilities owned by the club include Vila Olímpica ("Olympic Village"), the old training grounds opened in 1973 that hosted the Seleção in its preparation for the 1982 FIFA World Cup, and Labareda, a leisure and health club in Belo Horizonte. In 2015, Daniel Nepomuceno, the club president, announced that Atlético had a four-year project to build a new stadium in Belo Horizonte, with a 45,000 capacity. In 2017, the club's Deliberative Council approved the project to build the new stadium, in northeastern Belo Horizonte, named Arena MRV. The construction is projected to cost R$410 million, and expected to be inaugurated on the third quarter of 2022.

== Supporters ==
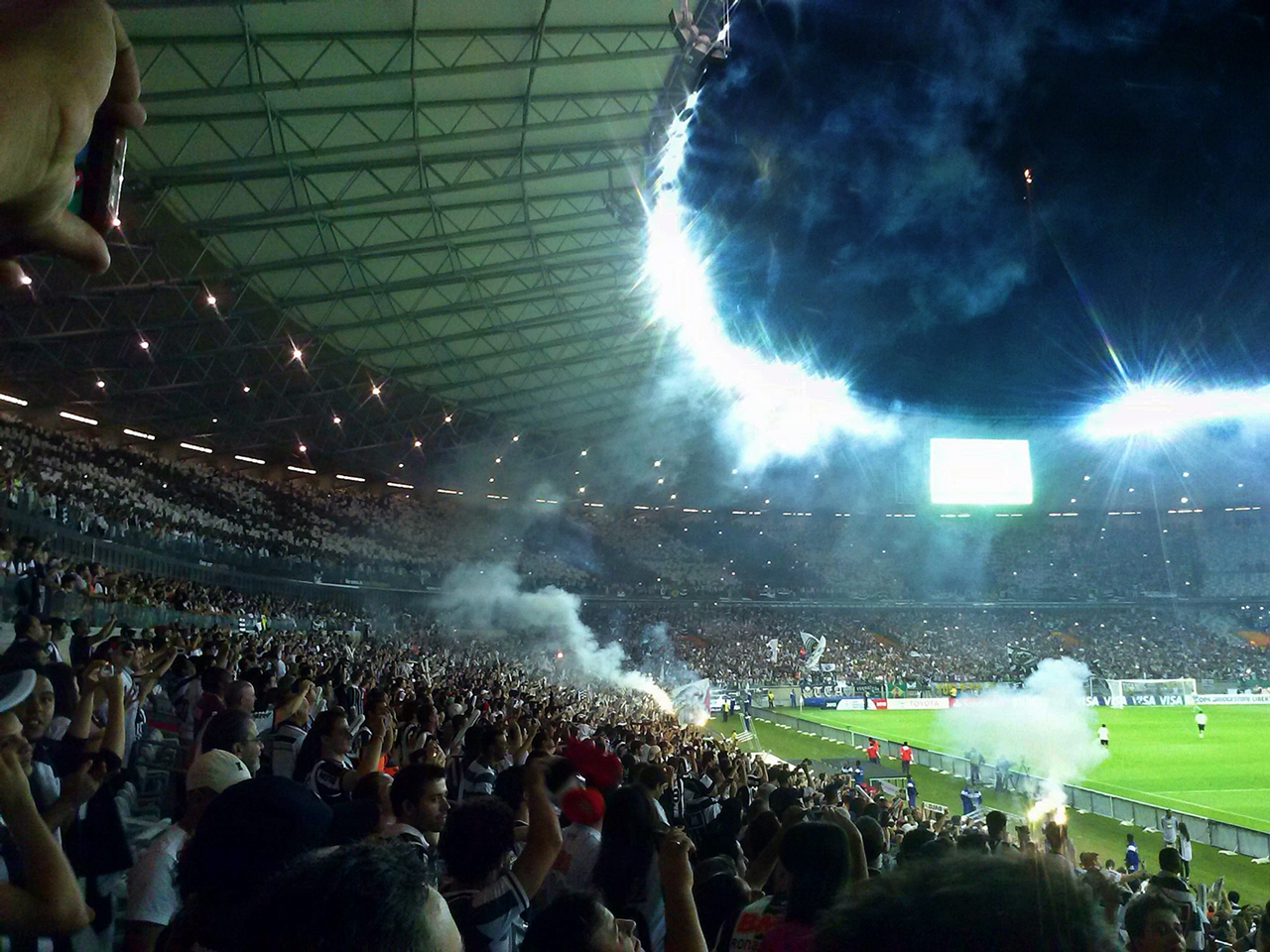
A Massa supporting Atlético Mineiro at the Mineirão in 2013

Atlético Mineiro was founded by upper-class students, but from an early age it opened its doors to players from every social class, nationality or ethnicity, which earned it a "people's club" status in Belo Horizonte and in the state. As a result of vast popular support, the fans came to be collectively known as "A Massa" (Portuguese for "the mass"). According to a 2014 survey conducted by IBOPE and Lance!, the club is the second best-supported in Belo Horizonte and in Minas Gerais and has the eighth largest fanbase in Brazil, with over five million supporters.

Atlético has many torcidas organizadas that support the club, the oldest being Dragões da FAO, founded in 1969, and the largest and best-known being Galoucura. Other notable groups include Galö Metal, Movimento 105 Minutos and the Charanga, a brass band that plays during the club's home matches. Galoucura has historically developed alliances with other torcidas in Brazil, most notably Palmeiras's Mancha Verde and Vasco da Gama's Força Jovem. After difficult but successful comebacks in 2013 and 2014, the fans have adopted the motto "Eu acredito" ("I believe") to support the club in against-the-odds situations. Squad number 12 is retired from the club's kits and dedicated to the fans.

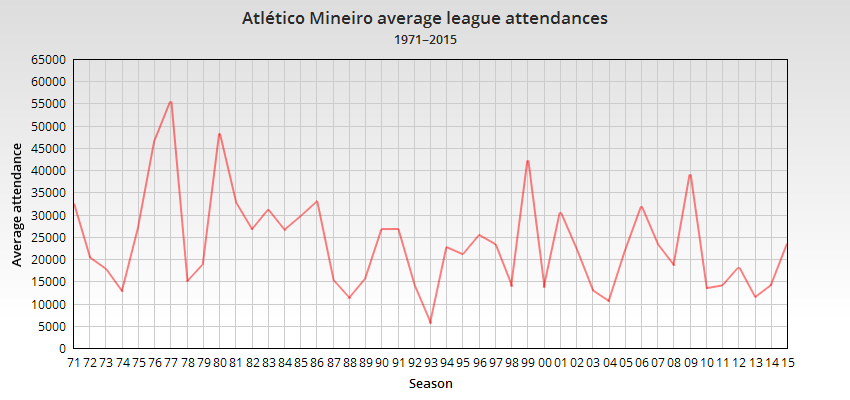
Chart with Atlético Mineiro's average attendances in the national league from 1971 to 2015

Atlético has had the best average attendance in nine editions of the Série A since 1972, and has the second highest all-time average attendance in Brazilian football. The club also ranks second in all-time total attendance in the national league, with more than 13 million tickets sold in 581 home matches as of the 2014 season. The second leg of the 2013 Copa Libertadores finals between Atlético and Olimpia, played at the Mineirão and attended by 58,620 people, had the highest gate receipt revenue of all time in South American football, yielding R$14.2 million (€4.8 million at the time).

In 1999, the club introduced Galo de Prata ("Silver Rooster"), a trophy officially awarded by Atlético to sportspeople, illustrious supporters, artists, politicians, and organisations that somehow promote the club's name. Since the implementation of municipal and state laws in 2007 and 2008, Dia do Atleticano ("Atleticano Day") is officially celebrated in Belo Horizonte and Minas Gerais every year on 25 March, the day of the club's foundation. Atlético launched TV Galo in 2007, a premium television channel that provides content for fans such as interviews with players and staff, coverage of training sessions and matches, footballing news, and other themed programming. Since 2012, the club has an affiliation programme called Galo na Veia, in which supporters can become season ticket holders or pay an annual or monthly fees to buy match tickets at reduced price.

== Rivalries ==
The local rivalry between Atlético and Cruzeiro, known as the Clássico Mineiro ("Mineiro Derby"), started years after the latter's foundation as Società Sportiva Palestra Italia in 1921. It strengthened in the 1940s and became the biggest derby in Minas Gerais in the 1960s. Atlético dominated the rivalry from its early days until the late 1950s, Cruzeiro rose in the 1960s to be a strong challenger and the 1970s had divided honours. The 1980s were favourable to Atlético, whilst the 1990s and 2000s were dominated by Cruzeiro. The 2010s have the rivals competing at an even level. The 2020s have been favourable to Atlético, partly due to its local rivals' three years in a row in relegation level of Brazilian national football. The clubs dissent over the number of matches and head-to-head record of the Clássico Mineiro, but both teams' statistics show Atlético with most wins in the encounter: 518 matches, 210 wins, 138 draws and 171 losses (as of June 2023). The only national final between the two clubs happened in the 2014 Copa do Brasil, when Atlético triumphed in a final match played at Mineirão. The Clássico Mineiro's most extreme result was an Atlético 9–2 Cruzeiro win in the 1927 Campeonato Mineiro.

The derby between Atlético and América was known as the Clássico das Multidões ("Derby of the Masses"), before Mineirão was built. America dominated the early years of the encounter, winning ten consecutive Campeonato Mineiro titles from 1916 to 1925. In the 1930s, Atlético pioneered professionalization of football in Minas Gerais, whereas América resisted against it. From that time on, Galo became the major force between the two, with América suffering a setback as a result of its internal disagreements regarding professionalism.

Atlético also holds a rivalry with Flamengo of Rio de Janeiro, with the first match between the clubs being played in 1929. Until regular national competitions were introduced in Brazilian football in 1959, however, the encounters were played at friendly level, since the clubs are from different states. The rivalry developed in the 1980s, rising from numerous tendentious events and controversial encounters between the two clubs in Campeonato Brasileiro and Copa Libertadores editions of the period. It remained through the following decades and is considered the biggest interstate rivalry in Brazilian football.

== Records and statistics ==
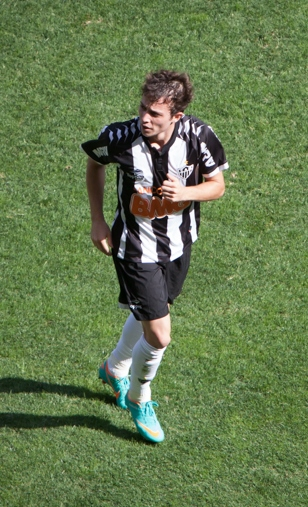
Bernard, who won the 2013 Copa Libertadores with Atlético, is the club's record sale.

João Leite holds Atlético's official appearance record, with 684 matches in all competitions. Reinaldo is the club's all-time leading goalscorer, with 255 goals, since joining the first squad in 1973. In the 1977 season, he scored 28 goals in 18 appearances, setting the club record for the most Campeonato Brasileiro goals in a season, and the league's best average goal-per-game record (1.55). Dadá Maravilha is second in total goals, with 211, and the only other Atlético player to score over 200 goals. Argentine striker Lucas Pratto is Atlético's all-time top foreign goalscorer, with 41 goals. The players that hold the record for most titles won at Atlético are João Leite and Réver, with 12 titles each. Telê Santana is Galo's longest-serving head coach, having taken charge of the team for 434 matches during three periods in the 1970s and 1980s. Nelson Campos is the club's longest-serving president, with nine years in the office in three terms.

The first official game in which Atlético participated was against Yale for the 1915 Campeonato Mineiro, which the team won 5–0. The biggest victory ever recorded by Galo was 13–0, against Calafate in the 1927 Campeonato Mineiro. In the national league, the biggest win came against Desportiva Ferroviária – 7–1 in the 1982 season. Atlético's biggest win in the Copa do Brasil, 11–0 against Caiçara in 1991, is also the competition's record victory. The club's home attendance record – split-crowd derbies excepted – is 115,142, in a friendly against Flamengo at the Mineirão, in 1980. The record attendance in official matches is 113,749, achieved in a match against Santos for the 1983 Brasileirão. Atlético holds the Brazilian record for longest unbeaten run at home, with 54 matches from 2011 to 2013, with 44 wins and 10 draws. The signing of Júnior Santos from Botafogo in 2025 is the club's most expensive purchase, costing around €8.2 million, while the record sale is the transfer of Bernard to Shakhtar Donetsk in 2013, which cost the Ukrainian club €25 million.

== Organization and finances ==
Since 2023, Atlético Mineiro is a privately-owned SAF that is controlled by Galo Holding, formed by Rafael and Rubens Menin, Ricardo Guimarães and Daniel Vorcaro, holding 75% of the SAF's shares. The other 25% are owned by the not-for-profit public utility organization, formed by associates (sócios), controlled by the Deliberative Council and the Board. The Deliberative Council among its members every three years, which in turn elects and removes the club's Board, responsible for the executive management of the club's shares in the SAF. Season ticket-holders and participants of the Galo na Veia affiliation programme, called sócios-torcedores, are not full club associates and cannot vote or be elected.

A study conducted by Sports Value in 2025 indicated that the club had a brand value of R$ 3.373 billion(€516.74 million), making it the fourth most valuable in Brazil. In terms of annual turnover, Atlético ranked sixth in the country in 2024, earning R$657 million (€100.6 million) The club has a main sponsorship deal with H2bet, worth R$60 million (€9.2 million) annually. It has a kit sponsorship deal with Nike.

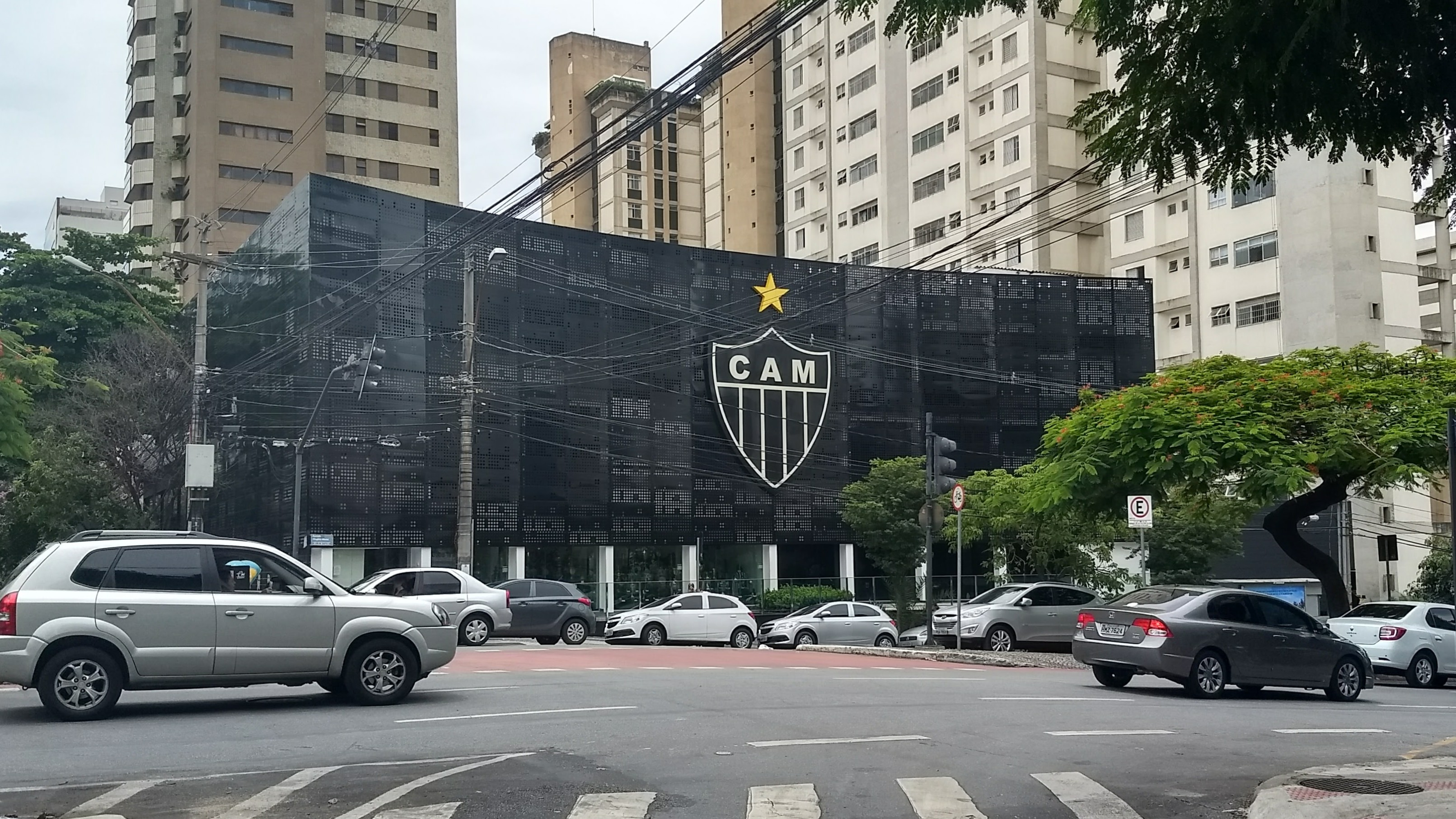
Clube Atlético Mineiro headquarters in Belo Horizonte.

The club's gross debt as of 2025 was R$1.37 billion(€214 million), the second largest in Brazil. The majority of the club's debt is owed to banks, totaling R$507 million (€77.6 million); in 2015, Atlético and other clubs joined a government program for fiscal debt financing.

== In popular culture ==
Atlético Mineiro and episodes in the club's history have appeared on films and other media. The music video for "É Uma Partida de Futebol" ("It's a Football Match"), by Brazilian rock band Skank, was filmed during a 1997 Clássico Mineiro match between Atlético and Cruzeiro; the video won three categories at the 1997 MTV Video Music Brazil awards. An Atlético match was also depicted in a Martian Manhunter comic book, by DC Comics, in 2015. The protagonist in Memories of the Desert, a 2014 Brazilian crime drama film, is a supporter of the club (as is the actor who portrayed him, Daniel de Oliveira).

A short film about goalkeeper Victor's iconic penalty-kick save against Tijuana in the 2013 Copa Libertadores was released in 2014; named A Dream You Dream Together Is Reality, it was awarded the Guirlande D'Honneur by the FICTS at the "Sport Movies & TV - Milano International FICTS Fest". In the following year, O Dia do Galo, a documentary that followed five Atlético supporters on the day of the final match of the same competition, was released in theatres as a feature film. The motion picture was one of the most watched Brazilian films of 2015, and won the Popular Jury award at the Mostra de Cinema de Tiradentes. O Imortal do Gelo, a film about the club's 1950 tour to Europe, was released in 2015. Another film called Lutar, Lutar, Lutar was released in 2021 and it focuses on the club's history and honours, while also remembering the tendentious decisions against the club in the 1980s.

== Honours ==
Atlético Mineiro's first trophy was the Taça Bueno Brandão, won in 1914. The club was the first winner of the Campeonato Mineiro, the state league of Minas Gerais, a competition it has won a record 49 times; it has also won the Taça Minas Gerais, a state cup, on five occasions. At national level, Atlético has won the Campeonato Brasileiro three times, while finishing second on five seasons; and also won the Copa do Brasil twice, winning their second titles of both the two major national tournaments in the same year of 2021. It has also won the Copa dos Campeões Brasileiros once. In international competitions, Atlético has won the Copa Libertadores and the Recopa Sudamericana once each, and a record two Copa CONMEBOL trophies; the club has also finished as runner-up of the Copa CONMEBOL, the Copa de Oro and the Copa Master de CONMEBOL. The club has competed in the FIFA Club World Cup once, finishing in third place. The club's most recent title is the 2023 Campeonato Mineiro.

=== Official tournaments ===
Continental
Competitions	Titles	Seasons
Copa Libertadores	1	2013
Recopa Sudamericana	1	2014
Copa CONMEBOL	2	1992, 1997
National
Competitions	Titles	Seasons
Campeonato Brasileiro Série A	3	1937, 1971, 2021
Copa do Brasil	2	2014, 2021
Supercopa do Brasil	1	2022
Copa dos Campeões da Copa Brasil	1	1978
Campeonato Brasileiro Série B	1	2006
State
Competitions	Titles	Seasons
Campeonato Mineiro	50	1915, 1926, 1927, 1931, 1932, 1936, 1938, 1939, 1941, 1942, 1946, 1947, 1949, 1950, 1952, 1953, 1954, 1955, 1956, 1958, 1962, 1963, 1970, 1976, 1978, 1979, 1980, 1981, 1982, 1983, 1985, 1986, 1988, 1989, 1991, 1995, 1999, 2000, 2007, 2010, 2012, 2013, 2015, 2017, 2020, 2021, 2022, 2023, 2024, 2025
Taça Minas Gerais	5^{s}	1975, 1976, 1979, 1986, 1987

- record
- ^{s} shared record

=== Others tournaments ===
==== International ====
- Trofeo Conde de Fenosa (1): 1976
- Trofeo Cidade de Vigo (1): 1977
- Trofeo Costa del Sol (1): 1980
- Trofeo Villa de Bilbao (1): 1982
- Tournoi de Paris (1): 1982
- Bern Tournament (1): 1983
- Amsterdam Tournament (1): 1984
- Ramón de Carranza Trophy (1): 1990
- Copa Centenário de Belo Horizonte (1): 1997
- Three Continents Cup (1): 1999
- Florida Cup (1): 2016

==== National and Inter-state ====
- Torneio Quadrangular de Colatina (1): 1953
- Torneio Quadrangular de Belo Horizonte (2): 1955, 1960
- Torneio Triangular de Franca (1): 1956
- Troféu Ivo Magalhães (1): 1963
- Torneio Cidade de Goiânia (1): 1970
- Torneio Cidade de São José dos Campos (1): 1970
- Taça Vitória-Minas (1): 1974
- Troféu Brasília 21 anos (1): 1981
- Troféu Osmar Santos (2): 2012, 2021
- Troféu João Saldanha (2): 2021, 2023

==== State ====
- Taça Belo Horizonte (3): 1970, 1971, 1972
- Champions Cup (FMF) (1): 1974
- Torneio Incentivo Mineiro (1): 1993
- Torneio Início do Campeonato Mineiro (8): 1928, 1931, 1932, 1939, 1947, 1949, 1950, 1954

==== City ====
- Taça Bueno Brandão (1): 1914
- Copa Belo Horizonte (1): 1959

=== Runners-up ===
- Copa Libertadores (1): 2024
- Copa Sudamericana (2): 2025, 2026
- Copa CONMEBOL (1): 1995
- Copa de Oro (1): 1993
- Copa Masters CONMEBOL (1): 1996
- Campeonato Brasileiro Série A (5): 1977, 1980, 1999, 2012, 2015
- Copa do Brasil (2): 2016, 2024
- Campeonato Mineiro (40): 1916, 1917, 1918, 1921, 1923, 1928, 1929, 1934, 1935, 1940, 1943, 1944, 1948, 1951, 1966, 1967, 1968, 1969, 1972, 1974, 1975, 1977, 1984, 1987, 1990, 1993, 1994, 1996, 1998, 2001, 2003, 2004, 2008, 2009, 2011, 2014, 2016, 2018, 2019, 2026
- Taça Minas Gerais (4): 1973, 1982, 1983, 1985

=== Youth team ===
- Campeonato Brasileiro Sub-20 (1): 2020
- Copa do Brasil Sub-20 (1): 2017
- Campeonato Brasileiro Sub-17 (1): 2025
- Copa do Brasil Sub-17 (1): 2014
- Copa São Paulo de Futebol Júnior (3): 1975, 1976, 1983
- Supercopa São Paulo de Futebol Júnior (1): 1994
- Taça Belo Horizonte de Juniores (6): 1988, 1989, 2005, 2009, 2011, 2018
- Copa Santiago de Futebol Juvenil (1): 2006

== Players ==
=== First team squad ===
As of 13 September 2026

Note: Flags indicate national team as defined under FIFA eligibility rules; some limited exceptions apply. Players may hold more than one non-FIFA nationality.

No.	Pos.	Nation	Player
1	GK	BRA	Gabriel Delfim
2	DF	BRA	Natanael
3	DF	BRA	Léo Duarte
4	DF	BRA	Ruan Tressoldi
5	MF	BRA	Alexsander
6	DF	BRA	Renan Lodi
7	MF	BRA	Fred (vice-captain)
8	MF	BRA	Maycon
9	FW	COL	Mateo Cassierra
10	MF	BRA	Gustavo Scarpa
11	MF	BRA	Bernard
13	DF	BRA	Lyanco
14	DF	BRA	Vitor Hugo
15	MF	COL	Kevin Castaño (on loan from River Plate)
17	MF	BRA	Igor Gomes
18	FW	URU	Thiago Borbas (on loan from Red Bull Bragantino)

No.	Pos.	Nation	Player
19	MF	BRA	Reinier
21	MF	ECU	Alan Franco
22	GK	BRA	Everson (captain)
23	DF	ECU	Ángelo Preciado
25	MF	ARG	Tomás Pérez (on loan from Porto)
27	FW	ECU	Alan Minda
28	FW	ARG	Tomás Cuello
29	FW	BRA	Cauã Soares
30	MF	BRA	Victor Hugo
31	GK	BRA	Robert
36	DF	BRA	Kauã Pascini
38	MF	BRA	Índio
39	MF	GUI	Mamady Cissé
40	DF	BRA	Vitão
46	GK	BRA	Pedro Cobra
92	FW	BRA	Dudu

=== Youth players ===
Note: Flags indicate national team as defined under FIFA eligibility rules; some limited exceptions apply. Players may hold more than one non-FIFA nationality.

No.	Pos.	Nation	Player
32	DF	BRA	Luís Gustavo
34	DF	BRA	Samuel Lima
41	FW	BRA	Murillo Fernandes
43	GK	BRA	Kaio Assis

No.	Pos.	Nation	Player
48	MF	BRA	Gutte
53	DF	BRA	Pedro Lemos
58	MF	BRA	Eric Soares
59	FW	BRA	Gabriel Veneno

=== Out on loan ===
Note: Flags indicate national team as defined under FIFA eligibility rules; some limited exceptions apply. Players may hold more than one non-FIFA nationality.

No.	Pos.	Nation	Player
—	DF	BRA	Vitor Gabriel (to Caxias until 31 October 2026)
—	DF	BRA	Rômulo (to Criciúma until 31 March 2027)
—	DF	CHI	Iván Román (to Colo-Colo until 30 June 2027)
—	MF	BRA	Daniel Penha (to Avaí until 31 December 2026)
—	MF	BRA	David Kauã (to Cianorte until 31 December 2026)
—	MF	BRA	Gabriel Menino (to Santos until 31 December 2026)
—	MF	BRA	Kauan Guilherme (to Anápolis until 31 December 2026)
—	MF	BRA	Mateus Iseppe (to Nacional until 30 June 2027)

No.	Pos.	Nation	Player
—	MF	BRA	Robert Santos (to Chapecoense until 31 December 2026)
—	MF	ARG	Fausto Vera (to River Plate until 31 December 2026)
—	MF	BRA	Patrick (to Red Bull Bragantino until 30 April 2027)
—	MF	BRA	Paulo Vitor (to Avaí until 31 December 2026)
—	FW	BRA	Cadu (to Goiás until 31 December 2026)
—	FW	BRA	Caio Maia (to Londrina until 31 December 2026)
—	FW	BRA	João Marcelo (to Shabab Al Ahli until 31 December 2026)
—	FW	BRA	Júnior Santos (to Botafogo until 31 December 2026)

== Management ==
=== Staff ===
Position	Name
Head coach	(Argentina) Eduardo Domínguez
Football general manager	(Brazil) Pedro Moreira
Coach staff coordinator	(Brazil) Gabriel Andreata
Assistant coach	(Brazil) Diogo Alves
Assistant coach	(Brazil) Lucas Gonçalves
Assistant coach	(Argentina) Leandro Díaz
Assistant coach	(Argentina) Alan Sanchez
Fitness coach	(Brazil) Ricardo Seguins
Fitness coach	(Brazil) Marcelo Luchesi
Fitness coach	(Argentina) Martin Frattini
Fitness coach	(Argentina) Adrián Vaccarini
Goalkeeping coach	(Brazil) Danilo Minutti
Goalkeeping coach	(Brazil) Rafael César
Performance analyst	(Brazil) Tadeu Meschine
Performance analyst	(Brazil) Alexandre Cosme
Performance analyst	(Brazil) Matheus Dupin
Performance analyst	(Argentina) Bruno Olivetto
Medical director	(Brazil) Rodrigo Lasmar
Doctor	(Brazil) Otaviano Oliveira
Doctor	(Brazil) Rodrigo Barreiros
Doctor	(Brazil) Haroldo Christo Aleixo
Physiotherapist	(Brazil) Guilherme Fialho
Physiotherapist	(Brazil) Bruno Leite
Physiotherapist	(Brazil) Vinícius Castro
Physiotherapist	(Brazil) Renato de Paula
Physiotherapist	(Brazil) André Biondi
Physiologist	(Brazil) Roberto Chiari
Physiologist	(Brazil) Rodrigo Morandi
Nutritionist	(Brazil) Evandro Vasconcelos
Nutritionist	(Brazil) Bárbara Maciel
Nutritionist	(Brazil) Saymon Reis
Psychologist	(Brazil) Michelle Rios
Social worker	(Brazil) Neila Bittencourt
Masseur	(Brazil) Alexandre William
Masseur	(Brazil) Aluízio Carlos
Masseur	(Brazil) Fabrício Carvalho
Masseur	(Brazil) Vinícius Barros
Podiatrist	(Brazil) Fabíola Efigênia
Market coordinator	(Brazil) Rafael Barros
Market analyst	(Brazil) Pedro Picchioni
Market analyst	(Brazil) Edgard Albino
Press secretary	(Brazil) Fabrício Almeida
Press secretary	(Brazil) Felipe Ribeiro
Logistics manager	(Brazil) Guilherme Ribeiro
Logistics manager	(Brazil) Henrique Daimond
Security chief	(Brazil) Olimpo Garcia
Security supervisor	(Brazil) Luiz Andrey Duarte
Security guard	(Brazil) Rafael Valente
Security guard	(Brazil) Willian Lobo
Security guard	(Brazil) Geovane Barcelos
Kit manager	(Brazil) Júlio Pacheco
Kit manager	(Brazil) Luciano Caxeado
Kit manager	(Brazil) Gilvan Felipe
Storeroom assistant	(Brazil) Marco Thulio
Field assistant	(Brazil) Rubens Pinheiro
Field assistant	(Brazil) Ronald Rogério
Administrative analist	(Brazil) Matheus Salomão
Administrative assistant	(Brazil) Hugo Gabriel

Last updated: 24 February 2026
Source: Comissão Técnica – Atlético (in Portuguese)

=== Club board ===
Position	Name
CEO	(Brazil) Pedro Daniel
Director of finance and administration	(Brazil) Thiago Maia
CSO of football	(Brazil) Paulo Bracks
Medical director	(Brazil) Rodrigo Lasmar
Director of communications	(Brazil) Domênico Bhering
Director of competitions	(Brazil) Pedro Tavares
Director of technology and innovation	(Brazil) Leandro Evangelista
Director of engineering	(Brazil) Carlos Pinheiro
Director of business	(Brazil) João Gomide
Director of operations	(Brazil) Leonardo Barbosa
Legal director	(Brazil) Pedro Torquato
Director of logistics	(Brazil) Guilherme Ribeiro
President	(Brazil) Sérgio Coelho
Vice-president	(Brazil) Márcio André de Brito
General director	(Brazil) Paulo Braz
Director of institutional relations	(Brazil) Gabriel Guimarães

Last updated: 27 December 2025

== Other departments ==
=== Futsal ===
Atlético Mineiro opened its futsal department in the 1960s, achieving victories at state level in the following decades, and winning the Taça Brasil in 1985. In the late 1990s, the team, named Atlético Pax de Minas for sponsorship reasons, was prominent at national and international level. With players such as Manoel Tobias, Falcão and Lenísio in the squad, Atlético won the Brazilian Liga Futsal twice, in 1997 and 1999, and the Intercontinental Futsal Cup in 1998, finishing as runner-up of both competitions in 2000. In the second leg of the 1999 Liga Futsal finals against Rio de Janeiro, the attendance at Mineirinho was 25,713, a world record in the sport. In 2000, the sponsorship deal with Pax de Minas ended and Atlético's professional senior futsal team folded in the following year, with the youth sectors remaining. The club's futsal department ceased operations in 2009.

=== American football ===
In March 2018, the club announced the creation of an American football team, a three-year partnership with Grupo Sada and BH Eagles, named Galo Futebol Americano. In its first season playing with this name in the Superliga Nacional de Futebol Americano, Brazil's American football league, the team won the Southeast Conference undefeated, and proceeded to win all matches in the playoffs, including the Brasil Bowl against João Pessoa Espectros.

=== Olympic sports ===
Atlético Mineiro had departments for other Olympic sports throughout its history, with the athletics and volleyball ones achieving notability. In 1983, runner João da Mata won the São Silvestre road race as an Atlético athlete. In 2007, Robert Kipkoech Cheruiyot and Alice Timbilil won the male and female categories of the same race, and celebrated their victory with Atlético flags. The club's board stated that the athletes had been sponsored as a marketing strategy. Atlético's men's volleyball department won the Minas Gerais Volleyball Championship a total of twelve times, ranking second in the state for most titles. The team had an especially successful period in the early 1980s, under the administrative management of Alexandre Kalil, who became club president in 2009.

== See also ==
- Clube Atlético Mineiro (women)
- Clube Atlético Mineiro (youth)
- Football in Brazil
