= Tomás Pérez (footballer) =

Argentine footballer (born 2005)

Personal information
- Date of birth: 26 August 2005 (age 21)
- Place of birth: Rosario, Argentina
- Height: 1.82 m (6 ft 0 in)
- Position: Defensive midfielder

Team information
- Current team: Atlético Mineiro (on loan from Porto)
- Number: 25

Youth career
- –2024: Newell's Old Boys

Senior career*
Years	Team	Apps	(Gls)
2024–2025	Newell's Old Boys	17	(1)
2025–	Porto	6	(0)
2025	Porto B	5	(0)
2026–	→ Atlético Mineiro (loan)	5	(0)

International career^{‡}
2024–2025	Argentina U20	8	(1)
Medal record
Men's football
Representing Argentina
FIFA U-20 World Cup
Runner-up	2025 Chile
- * Club domestic league appearances and goals as of 7 April 2026 ‡ National team caps and goals as of 9 November 2025

Tomás Pérez (born 26 August 2005) is an Argentine professional footballer who plays as a defensive midfielder for Campeonato Brasileiro Série A club Atlético Mineiro, on loan from Porto.

== Club career ==
Pérez is a product of the Newell's Old Boys youth academy and was promoted to the senior squad in July 2024. He made his senior debut in a league match that ended goalless against Independiente Rivadavia on 23 July. He scored his first senior goal on 2 August, in a league 4–1 defeat to Estudiantes.

On 4 February 2025, Pérez signed for Portuguese club Porto for a reported fee of €4 million on a four-and-a-half-year contract.

On 19 February 2026, Pérez joined Brazilian club Atlético Mineiro on loan for the 2026 season.

== International career ==
Pérez was a member of Argentina's squad at the 2025 FIFA U-20 World Cup, making five appearances and scoring one goal in a runners-up campaign.

== Career statistics ==
As of match played 30 November 2025

Appearances and goals by club, season and competition
Club	Season	League			National cup (Note: Includes Copa Argentina)		Continental		Other		Total	
Club	Season	Division	Apps	Goals	Apps	Goals	Apps	Goals	Apps	Goals	Apps	Goals
Newell's Old Boys	2024	Argentine Primera División	17	1	1	0	—		—		18	1
Porto	2024–25	Primeira Liga	6	0	0	0	1 (Note: Appearance(s) in UEFA Europa League)	0	1 (Note: Appearance(s) in FIFA Club World Cup)	0	8	0
Porto	2025–26	Primeira Liga	0	0	0	0	0	0	0	0	0	0
Porto	Total		6	0	0	0	0	0	0	0	6	0
Porto B	2025–26	Liga Portugal 2	5	0	—		—		—		5	0
Career total			28	1	1	0	1	0	1	0	31	1
