= Clube Atlético Mineiro (youth) =

Brazilian football youth academy

Atlético Mineiro Youth Sector
- Full name: Clube Atlético Mineiro
- Nickname: Galinho ("Little Rooster")
- Ground: Cidade do Galo
- President: Sérgio Coelho
- Head Coach: Leandro Zago (U-20); Henrique Teixeira (U-17); Vacant (U-15); Lucas Colturato (U-14)
- League: Campeonato Brasileiro Sub-20 Série B (U-20)
- 2025: 19th (relegated from Campeonato Brasileiro Sub-20)
- Website: www.atletico.com.br/base/
| Home colours | Away colours |

The Clube Atlético Mineiro Youth Sector (Brazilian Portuguese: Categorias de Base) are the youth academy of Clube Atlético Mineiro, a Brazilian football club based in Belo Horizonte. The youth sector is composed of various squads divided by age groups. All the youth teams currently train at the club's main training ground, Cidade do Galo, located in the municipality of Vespasiano. The U-20 squad currently compete in the Campeonato Brasileiro Sub-20 Série B, the Copa do Brasil Sub-20 and the Copa São Paulo de Futebol Júnior. Atlético Mineiro's youth squads of all categories have won trophies at national and international level.

== Structure ==
Atlético Mineiro's youth sector operates in Cidade do Galo, the main training facility for the club. It has a hotel able to host 90 youths, in 19 quadruple apartments and 12 triple ones. The youth facilities include a gym, a restaurant, a pedagogy room, a library, a gaming room, an auditorium with a 150 capacity, an Internet café, and departments for medicine, dentistry and physiotherapy. The youths are able to live in the facility and receive medical and educational assistance from the club.

The club's main youth squad is the U-20, called Júnior, which includes athletes aging 17 to 20. The Juvenil category is the U-17 squad. Players with 15 years old and less are categorised under the Infantil.

== Honours ==
=== International ===
- Terborg Tournament (U-20): 3

2006, 2008, 2016

- Kvarnerska Rivijera (U-19): 2

2003, 2004

- ICGT Youth Tournament (U-19): 3

2003, 2004

- Spax Cup (Ennepetal Tournament) (U-19): 3

2005, 2008, 2014

- Future Champions Tournament (U-17): 5

2010, 2011 (I), 2011 (II), 2012, 2014

- Torneo Internazionale Città di Gradisca (U-17): 4

2004, 2006, 2007, 2008

- Surf Cup International (U-16): 1

2023

- BH Youth Cup (U-15): 2

2009, 2011

- Copa da Amizade Brasil-Japão (U-15): 2

2000, 2010

=== National ===
- Campeonato Brasileiro Sub-20: 1

2020

- Copa do Brasil Sub-20: 1

2017

- Copa São Paulo de Futebol Júnior (U-20): 3

1975, 1976, 1983

- Super Copa São Paulo de Juniores (U-20): 1

1994

- Taça Belo Horizonte de Juniores (U-20): 6

1988, 1989, 2005, 2009, 2011, 2018

- Campeonato Brasileiro Sub-17: 1

2025

- Copa do Brasil Sub-17: 1

2014

- Copa Rio Sub-17: 2

1988, 2003

- Copa Santiago de Futebol Juvenil (U-17): 1

2006

- Copa 2 de Julho (U-15): 1

2023

=== State ===
- Campeonato Mineiro Sub-20: 34

1945, 1946, 1947, 1951, 1952, 1955, 1958, 1962, 1967, 1969, 1970, 1972, 1973, 1975, 1976, 1977, 1978, 1979, 1980, 1982, 1984, 1985, 1988, 1991, 1992, 1994, 1995, 2005, 2006, 2007, 2010, 2012, 2017 , 2019

- Campeonato Mineiro Sub-17: 24

1967, 1969, 1970, 1972, 1975, 1983, 1987, 1988, 1991, 1993, 1994, 1995, 2001, 2002, 2003, 2005, 2006, 2011, 2012, 2013, 2016, 2017, 2018, 2021

- Campeonato Mineiro Infantil Sub-15: 25

1971, 1972, 1973, 1974, 1977, 1978, 1980, 1985, 1986, 1988, 1989, 1990, 1991, 1992, 1994, 1995, 2009, 2010, 2012, 2013, 2015, 2017, 2019, 2022, 2023

== Notable graduates ==
List of former Clube Atlético Mineiro youth squads graduates who have played matches at full international level.

| Player | Year joined club | Years played for first team | National team | Years played for national team |
|---|---|---|---|---|
| Afonso Alves | 2000 | 2001–2002 | Brazil | 2007 |
| Bernard | 2006 | 2010–2013, 2024– | Brazil | 2012–2014 |
| Bremer | 2017 | 2017–2018 | Brazil | 2022– |
| Cláudio Caçapa | 1996 | 1997–2001 | Brazil | 2000–2001 |
| Dedê | 1995 | 1996–1998 | Brazil | 2004 |
| Diego Alves | 2004 | 2005–2007 | Brazil | 2011–2017 |
| Edivaldo | 1981 | 1982, 1984–1987 | Brazil | 1986–1989 |
| Jemerson | 2010 | 2012–2015, 2022–2024 | Brazil | 2017 |
| João Leite | 1970 | 1976–1988, 1991–1992 | Brazil | 1980–1981 |
| João Pedro | 2006 | 2010 | Italy | 2022 |
| Kléber | 2007 | 2009 | Brazil | 2011 |
| Leandro Castán | 2003 | 2005–2007 | Brazil | 2012–2013 |
| Lincoln | 1989 | 1997–2001 | Brazil | 1999 |
| Mamady Cissé | 2025 | 2026– | Guinea | 2026– |
| Mancini | 1997 | 1999–2002, 2011–2013 | Brazil | 2004–2008 |
| Marcelo Oliveira | 1969 | 1972–1984 | Brazil | 1975–1977 |
| Marcos Rocha | 2005 | 2009, 2012–2017 | Brazil | 2013 |
| Moacir | 1987 | 1988–1992, 1996 | Brazil | 1990–1991 |
| Paulo Isidoro | 1969 | 1975–1979, 1985–1987 | Brazil | 1977–1983 |
| Reinaldo | 1971 | 1973–1985 | Brazil | 1975–1985 |
| Savinho | 2018 | 2020–2022 | Brazil | 2024– |
| Sérgio Araújo | 1975 | 1980–1988 | Brazil | 1987 |
| Toninho Cerezo | 1971 | 1972–1983, 1997 | Brazil | 1977–1985 |
| Vantuir | 1968 | 1969–1978 | Brazil | 1972–1975 |

== See also ==
- Clube Atlético Mineiro
