= 2026 Mirassol Futebol Clube season =

Mirassol
2026 season
- President: Edson Antonio Ermenegildo
- Manager: Rafael Guanaes
- Stadium: Estádio José Maria de Campos Maia
- Campeonato Brasileiro Série A: 15th
- Campeonato Paulista: First stage
- Copa do Brasil: Round of 16
- Copa Libertadores: Round of 16
- Top goalscorer: League: Eduardo (7); All: Eduardo (10)
- Biggest win: São Bernardo 0–4 Mirassol
- Biggest defeat: Mirassol 1–5 Flamengo
Home colours	Away colours	Third colours
- All statistics correct as of 22 November 2026.

In the 2026 season, Mirassol Futebol Clube will compete in the Campeonato Brasileiro Série A, the Campeonato Paulista, and the Copa do Brasil. It also participated, for the first time in its history, in a continental competition, the Copa Libertadores.

This represents the first full season led by coach Rafael Guanaes.

== Transfers ==
=== In ===
Pos.	Player	Transferred from	Fee	Date	Source
MF	(Brazil) José Aldo	(Brazil) Ituano	Undisclosed	16 December 2025	
FW	(Brazil) Nathan Fogaça	(Brazil) Novorizontino	Free	26 December 2025	
MF	(Brazil) Yuri Lara	(Japan) Yokohama FC	Free	3 January 2026	
FW	(Brazil) André Luis	(China) Shanghai Shenhua	Free	3 January 2026	
MF	(Brazil) Lucas Oliveira	(Brazil) Vasco da Gama	Free	4 January 2026	
FW	(Brazil) Rodrigo Rodrigues	(Brazil) Operário Ferroviário	Free	4 January 2026	
MF	(Brazil) Denilson	(Brazil) Cuiabá	Undisclosed	5 January 2026	
MF	(Argentina) Lucas Mugni	(Brazil) Ceará	Free	5 January 2026	
DF	(Brazil) Willian Machado	(Brazil) Ceará	$1.5 million	6 January 2026	
MF	(Paraguay) Antonio Galeano	(Uruguay) Nacional	Undisclosed	8 January 2026	
MF	(Brazil) Eduardo	(Brazil) Cruzeiro	Free	9 January 2026	
DF	(Brazil) Igor Formiga	(Brazil) Juventude	Undisclosed	14 January 2026	
DF	(Brazil) Rodrigues	(United States) San Jose Earthquakes	Free	15 January 2026	
FW	(Brazil) Everton Galdino	(Japan) FC Tokyo	Loan	20 January 2026	
DF	(Brazil) Victor Luis	(Brazil) Vasco da Gama	Undisclosed	14 February 2026	
FW	(Brazil) Tiquinho Soares	(Brazil) Santos	Loan	20 February 2026	
GK	(Brazil) Georgemy	(Brazil) Criciúma	Free	3 March 2026	
MF	(Brazil) Gabriel Pires	(Brazil) Portuguesa	Undisclosed	4 March 2026	
MF	(Brazil) Luiz Filipe	(Brazil) Athletic Club	Loan return	26 March 2026	
FW	(Brazil) Alesson	(Russia) Torpedo Moscow	Undisclosed	1 July 2026	
FW	(Brazil) Edson Carioca	(Brazil) Goiás	R$ 1.5 million	1 July 2026	
MF	(Brazil) Japa	(Brazil) Cruzeiro	Loan	9 July 2026	
DF	(Brazil) Gabriel Knesowitsch	(Brazil) Cuiabá	Loan	10 July 2026	
DF	(Brazil) Elias	(Brazil) Vila Nova	Loan	11 July 2026	
FW	(Brazil) Bruno Santos	(Brazil) Londrina	Undisclosed	12 July 2026	
MF	(Brazil) Fernandinho	(Brazil) Ceará	Free	14 July 2026	
MF	(Brazil) Gustavo Cazonatti	(Peru) Sporting Cristal	Undisclosed	16 July 2026	
MF	(Brazil) Gustavo Silva	(Japan) Júbilo Iwata	Free	21 July 2026	
MF	(Brazil) Wallisson	(Brazil) Coritiba	R$ 3 million	1 August 2026	
FW	(Brazil) Zé Roberto	(Brazil) Sport Recife	Free	11 September 2026	

=== Out ===
Pos.	Player	Transferred to	Fee	Date	Source
MF	(Brazil) Matheus Sales	(Brazil) Botafogo-SP		6 December 2025	
MF	(Brazil) Gabriel Santana	(Peru) Sporting Cristal		18 December 2025	
MF	(Brazil) Danielzinho	(Brazil) São Paulo	End of contract	19 December 2025	
DF	(Brazil) Da Silva	(Brazil) Botafogo-PB	Free	23 December 2025	
DF	(Brazil) Jemmes	(Brazil) Fluminense	$4 million	29 December 2025	
FW	(Brazil) Chico da Costa	(Paraguay) Cerro Porteño	Loan return	31 December 2025	
MF	(Brazil) Matheus Bianqui	(Brazil) Coritiba	Loan return	31 December 2025	
MF	(Brazil) Yago Felipe	(Brazil) Bahia	Loan return	31 December 2025	
MF	(Brazil) Roni	(Portugal) AVS	Undisclosed	6 January 2026	
MF	(Brazil) Guilherme Marques	(Brazil) Atlético Goianiense		9 January 2026	
FW	(Brazil) Cristian Renato	(South Korea) Busan IPark		16 January 2026	
DF	(Brazil) Felipe Jonatan	(Brazil) Fortaleza	Loan return	27 January 2026	
DF	(Brazil) Lucas Ramon	(Brazil) São Paulo	Free	3 February 2026	
DF	(Brazil) Luiz Otávio	(Brazil) Ceará		13 February 2026	
FW	(Brazil) Renato Marques	(Brazil) Coritiba	Loan	25 March 2026	
MF	(Argentina) Lucas Mugni	(Brazil) Ceará	Undisclosed	2 July 2026	
MF	(Brazil) Yuri Lima	(Japan) Júbilo Iwata	Contract terminated	2 July 2026	
DF	(Brazil) Rodrigues	(Greece) Kalamata		13 July 2026	
FW	(Brazil) Tiquinho Soares	(Brazil) Santos	Loan return (early)	17 July 2026	
FW	(Brazil) Nathan Fogaça	(Brazil) Fortaleza	Undisclosed	18 July 2026	
FW	(Brazil) Everton Galdino	(Japan) FC Tokyo	Loan return (early)	23 July 2026	
MF	(Brazil) Gabriel Pires	(Brazil) Juventude	Undisclosed	31 July 2026	
MF	(Paraguay) Antonio Galeano	(Brazil) Remo	Undisclosed	13 August 2026	

== Staff ==
Role	Name
Director of Football	Vacant
Head coach	Rafael Guanaes
Assistant manager	Ivan Baitello
Assistant manager	Rainer Oliveira
Fitness coach	Rafael Tamarindo
Fitness coach	Eduardo Alves

== Friendlies ==
27 September 2026 Friendly	Uberlândia (Minas Gerais)	0–4	(São Paulo (state)) Mirassol	Uberlândia
17:00 UTC−3			André Luis 31'; Carlos Eduardo 45+1'; Gustavo Silva 55'; Daniel Borges 77'	Stadium: Estádio Parque do Sabiá

== Competitions ==
=== Overall record ===
Competition	First match	Last match	Starting round	Final position	Record							
Competition	First match	Last match	Starting round	Final position	Pld	W	D	L	GF	GA	GD	Win %
Campeonato Brasileiro Série A	29 January 2026		Matchday 1		36	10	11	15	39	49	−10	27.78
Campeonato Paulista	11 January 2026	15 February 2026	First stage	First stage	8	2	2	4	10	8	+2	25.00
Copa do Brasil	22 April 2026	6 August 2026	Fifth round	Round of 16	4	1	2	1	4	4	+0	25.00
Copa Libertadores	8 April 2026	20 August 2026	Group stage	Round of 16	8	4	2	2	8	5	+3	50.00
Total					56	17	17	22	61	66	−5	30.36

Last updated: 22 November 2026
Source: Competitions

=== Campeonato Brasileiro Série A ===
Pos	Team	Pld	W	D	L	GF	GA	GD	Pts	Qualification or relegation
13	Botafogo	35	11	9	15	46	57	−11	42	
14	Vitória	35	11	8	16	37	52	−15	41	
15	Mirassol	36	10	11	15	39	49	−10	41	
16	Corinthians	35	10	10	15	40	42	−2	40	
17	Internacional	35	9	11	15	39	44	−5	38	Relegation to Campeonato Brasileiro Série B

Updated to match(es) played on 22 November 2026 (2 of 3 matches finished). Source: CBF
Rules for classification: 1) points; 2) wins; 3) goal difference; 4) goals scored; 5) head-to-head results (only between two teams); 6) fewest red cards; 7) fewest yellow cards; 8) drawing of lots.

==== Results summary ====
Overall								Home						Away					
Pld	W	D	L	GF	GA	GD	Pts	W	D	L	GF	GA	GD	W	D	L	GF	GA	GD
36	10	11	15	39	49	−10	41	7	7	4	24	22	+2	3	4	11	15	27	−12

Last updated: 22 November 2026.

==== Results by round ====
Round	1	2	3	4	5	6	7	8	9	10	11	12	13	14	15	16	17	18	19	20	21	22	23	24	25	26	27	28	29	30	31	32	33	34	35	36	37
Ground	H	A	H	A	H	A	H	A	A	H	H	A	A	H	H	A	H	A	H	A	H	A	H	A	H	A	H	H	A	A	H	H	A	A	H	A	H
Result	W	D	D	L	D	L	L	L	L	L	L	W	L	W	D	L	W	L	W	D	W	L	L	D	D	W	D	W	D	L	W	D	L	W	D	L	
Position	4	4	9	11	11	14	16	18	19	20	20	18	18	18	18	19	18	19	18	19	16	17	18	18	17	16	16	16	15	15	15	15	16	14	15		
Points	3	4	5	5	6	6	6	6	6	6	6	9	9	12	13	13	16	16	19	20	23	23	23	24	25	28	29	32	33	33	36	37	37	40	41	41	

Updated to match(es) played on 22 November 2026. Source:
A = Away; H = Home; W = Win; D = Draw; L = Loss

==== Matches ====
29 January 2026 1	Mirassol	2–1	Vasco da Gama	Mirassol
20:00 UTC−3	Cuesta 31' (o.g.); Eduardo 53'	Report	Coutinho 20'	Stadium: José Maria de Campos Maia; Attendance: 5,883; Referee: Rodrigo José Pereira de Lima

4 February 2026 2	Remo	2–2	Mirassol	Belém
20:00 UTC−3	João Pedro 8'; Hernández (yellow card) 35'; Manga 39'; João Lucas (yellow card) 72'	Report	Negueba (yellow card) 45'; José Aldo (yellow card) 72'; Igor Formiga 81'; Fogaça 89'	Stadium: Mangueirão; Attendance: 21,118; Referee: Alex Gomes Stefano

11 February 2026 3	Mirassol	2–2	Cruzeiro	Mirassol
19:00 UTC−3	Neto Moura (yellow card) 25'; Reinaldo (yellow card) 26'; José Aldo (yellow card) 30'; Nathan Fogaça 38'; Negueba 53'; Alex Muralha (yellow card) 85'; Yuri Lara (red card) 90+5'	Report	Matheus Pereira (yellow card) 4'; Wanderson 23'; Gerson (yellow card) 45+1'; Kaio Jorge 85' (pen.)	Stadium: José Maria de Campos Maia; Attendance: 5,134; Referee: Braulio Da Silva Machado

10 March 2026 5	Mirassol	2–2	Santos	Mirassol
21:30 UTC−3	Igor Formiga 21'; Willian Machado (yellow card) 65'; Negueba 71'	Report	João Schmidt (yellow card) 55'; Gabriel Barbosa 80', 88' (pen.), (yellow card) 90+3'	Stadium: José Maria de Campos Maia; Attendance: 8,152; Referee: Raphael Claus

15 March 2026 6	Palmeiras	1–0	Mirassol	São Paulo
18:30 UTC−3	López 26'; Carlos Miguel (yellow card) 67'		Neto Moura (yellow card) 21'; Reinaldo (yellow card) 29'; Negueba (yellow card) 90+4'	Stadium: Allianz Parque; Attendance: 35,360; Referee: Rodrigo José Pereira de Lima

18 March 2026 7	Mirassol	0–1	Coritiba	Mirassol
20:00 UTC−3	Victor Luis (yellow card) 16'; José Aldo (yellow card) 82'		Lavega 64', (yellow card) 69'; Pesqueira (yellow card) 90+3'	Stadium: José Maria de Campos Maia; Attendance: 4,129; Referee: Bruno Arleu de Araújo

22 March 2026 8	Vitória	1–0	Mirassol	Salvador
18:30 UTC−3	Gabriel Baralhas 28', (yellow card) 90+1'; Martínez (yellow card) 45+6'; Matheuzinho (yellow card) 68'		Pires (yellow card) 23'; Reinaldo (yellow card) 70'; Edson Carioca (yellow card) 72'	Stadium: Barradão; Attendance: 17,837; Referee: Wagner do Nascimento Magalhaes

1 April 2026 9	Botafogo	3–2	Mirassol	Rio de Janeiro
20:30 UTC−3	Cabral 11'; Alex Telles 43' (pen.); Medina (yellow card) 46'; Vitinho (yellow card) 48'; Júnior Santos 66'; Bastos (yellow card) 90+1'		Shaylon 21'; André Luis (yellow card) 38'; Negueba (yellow card) 45+1'; Tiquinho Soares (yellow card) 62'; Igor Formiga 90+3'	Stadium: Estádio Nilton Santos; Attendance: 6,781; Referee: Wilton Sampaio

5 April 2026 10	Mirassol	0–1	Red Bull Bragantino	Mirassol
20:00 UTC−3	João Victor (yellow card) 59'; Carlos Eduardo (yellow card) 78'		Pitta 51', (yellow card) 67'; Juninho Capixaba (yellow card) 62'; Herrera (yellow card) 79'	Stadium: José Maria de Campos Maia; Attendance: 3,597; Referee: Flavio Rodrigues de Souza

11 April 2026 11	Mirassol	1–2	Bahia	Mirassol
18:30 UTC−3	Duarte 14' (o.g.); Edson Carioca (yellow card) 45+3'; José Aldo (yellow card) 57'; Victor Luis (yellow card) 61'; Oliveira (yellow card) 90'; Negueba (yellow card) 90+2'	Report	Juba 65' (pen.); Jean Lucas (yellow card) 79'; Sanabria 89'	Stadium: José Maria de Campos Maia; Attendance: 4,276; Referee: Paulo Cesar Zanovelli da Silva
Note: Eduardo was sent off as a substitute.

19 April 2026 12	Internacional	1–2	Mirassol	Porto Alegre
11:00 UTC−3	Alan Patrick 90+3'	Report	Lucas Oliveira (yellow card) 19', (goal) 22'; André Luis 45'; José Aldo (yellow card) 56'; Walter (yellow card) 62'	Stadium: Estádio Beira-Rio; Attendance: 30,601; Referee: Davi De Oliveira Lacerda

25 April 2026 13	São Paulo	1–0	Mirassol	Campinas
21:00 UTC−3	Luciano 76'	Report		Stadium: Estádio Brinco de Ouro; Attendance: 15,706; Referee: Raphael Claus

3 May 2026 14	Mirassol	2–1	Corinthians	Mirassol
20:30 UTC−3	Edson Carioca (yellow card) 16', (goal) 33'; Carlos Eduardo 23' (pen.); Galeano (yellow card) 76'; Neto Moura (yellow card) 78'; Walter (yellow card) 87'; André Luis (yellow card) 90+5'	Report	Allan (yellow card) 38'; Dieguinho 80'; Gabriel Paulista (yellow card) 90+5'	Stadium: José Maria de Campos Maia; Attendance: 9,943; Referee: Matheus Delgado Candançan

10 May 2026 15	Mirassol	1–1	Chapecoense	Mirassol
18:30 UTC−3	Eduardo 71'	Report	João Victor 81' (o.g.)	Stadium: José Maria de Campos Maia; Attendance: 2,343; Referee: Felipe Fernandes de Lima

16 May 2026 16	Atlético Mineiro	3–1	Mirassol	Belo Horizonte
18:30 UTC−3	Minda 16'; Maycon 60' (pen.); Cissé 83'	Report	Willian Machado 39'	Stadium: Arena MRV; Attendance: 20,027; Referee: Lucas Casagrande

23 May 2026 17	Mirassol	1–0	Fluminense	Mirassol
19:00 UTC−3	Alesson (yellow card) 7'; Denilson (yellow card) 35', (goal) 36'; Reinaldo (yellow card) 82'	Report	Acosta (yellow card) 33'; Nonato (yellow card) 38'; Freytes (yellow card) 90+7'	Stadium: José Maria de Campos Maia; Attendance: 7,085; Referee: Sávio Pereira Sampaio

30 May 2026 18	Athletico Paranaense	1–0	Mirassol	Curitiba
16:00 UTC−3	Viveros 88'	Report		Stadium: Arena da Baixada; Attendance: 27,927; Referee: Fernando Antonio Mendes de Salles Nascimento Filho

17 July 2026 19	Mirassol	2–1	Grêmio	Mirassol
20:00 UTC−3	Bruno Santos 16'; Denilson (yellow card) 38'; Edson Carioca 40'	Report	Kannemann (yellow card) 41'; Gustavo Martins (yellow card) 65'; Carlos Vinícius 77'; Pérez (yellow card) 79'	Stadium: José Maria de Campos Maia; Attendance: 4,593; Referee: Bruno Arleu de Araújo

25 July 2026 20	Vasco da Gama	1–1	Mirassol	Rio de Janeiro
20:30 UTC−3	Gómez 80'; Nuno Moreira (yellow card) 83'	Report	Igor Formiga 30'; Walter (yellow card) 66'	Stadium: São Januário; Attendance: 10,649; Referee: Rafael Rodrigo Klein

29 July 2026 21	Mirassol	2–1	Remo	Mirassol
19:30 UTC−3	Igor Formiga (yellow card) 17'; Gabriel (yellow card) 21'; Marllon 30' (o.g.); João Victor 54'	Report	Picco 45'; Matheus Alexandre (yellow card) 72'; Zé Ivaldo (yellow card) 72'	Stadium: José Maria de Campos Maia; Attendance: 4,519; Referee: Lucas Paulo Torezin

9 August 2026 22	Cruzeiro	3–1	Mirassol	Belo Horizonte
11:00 UTC−3	João Marcelo 12'; Gerson (yellow card) 26'; Kenji (yellow card) 48'; Kaio Jorge 76'; Wesley 84', (yellow card) 85'	Report	Reinaldo 27' (pen.); Elias (yellow card) 68'; Shaylon (yellow card) 90+4'	Stadium: Mineirão; Attendance: 57,850; Referee: Lucas Casagrande

16 August 2026 23	Mirassol	1–5	Flamengo	Mirassol
18:30 UTC−3	Denilson (yellow card) 45+3'; Cazonatti (yellow card) 51'; João Victor 77'; Neto Moura (yellow card) 85'	Report	Carrascal 22'; Luiz Araújo 53'; Pedro 56', 66'; Lino 74'	Stadium: José Maria de Campos Maia; Attendance: 9,914; Referee: Rafael Rodrigo Klein

23 August 2026 24	Santos	1–1	Mirassol	Santos
18:30 UTC−3	Schmidt (yellow card) 20'; Barreal 68'; Neymar (yellow card) 88'	Report	Gabriel (yellow card) 22'; Neto Moura (yellow card) 24'; Eduardo 36'; Wallisson (red card) 73'; Igor Formiga (yellow card) 76'	Stadium: Vila Belmiro; Attendance: 14,751; Referee: Edina Alves Batista

30 August 2026 25	Mirassol	1–1	Palmeiras	Mirassol
18:30 UTC−3	Eduardo 50'; Denilson (yellow card) 85'; Neto Moura (yellow card) 90+8'	Report	Maurício 75'; Arthur Gabriel (yellow card) 90+7' (yellow-red card) 90+9'	Stadium: José Maria de Campos Maia; Attendance: 10,599; Referee: João Vitor Gobi

2 September 2026 4	Flamengo	2–0	Mirassol	Rio de Janeiro
19:30 UTC−3	Carrascal 14'; Lucas Paquetá 43'	Report	João Victor (yellow card) 66'; Denilson (yellow card) 81'	Stadium: Maracanã Stadium; Attendance: 60,155; Referee: Anderson Daronco
Note: The match originally scheduled for 25 February was rescheduled due to Flamengo's involvement in the Recopa Sudamericana.

6 September 2026 26	Coritiba	1–2	Mirassol	Curitiba
11:00 UTC−3	Thiago Santos (yellow card) 34'; Pedro Rocha 61'; JP Chermont (yellow card) 63'	Report	Denilson (yellow card) 27'; Daniel Borges (yellow card) 27'; João Victor (yellow card) 34'; Gustavo Silva 64'; Bruno Santos 84'; Shaylon (yellow card) 90+2'	Stadium: Estádio Couto Pereira; Attendance: 26,209; Referee: André Luiz Skettino Policarpo Bento
Note: The match, originally scheduled for 5 September at 18:30, was moved because of the scheduling of the Flamengo vs. Mirassol fixture.

13 September 2026 27	Mirassol	2–2	Vitória	Mirassol
16:00 UTC−3	Alesson (yellow card) 29'; Wallisson (yellow card) 57'; Willian Machado (yellow card) 64'; Bruno Santos 67'; Edson Carioca 90', (yellow card) 90+2'; Fernandinho (yellow card) 90+10'	Report	Renê 3', 12'; Brítez (yellow card) 18'; Caíque (yellow card) 45'; Marinho (yellow card) 89'; Mateusinho (yellow card) 90+4'; Edenilson (yellow card) 90+10'	Stadium: José Maria de Campos Maia; Attendance: 4,393; Referee: Ramon Abatti

19 September 2026 28	Mirassol	2–0	Botafogo	Mirassol
17:00 UTC−3	Eduardo 16', 45+2'	Report	Huguinho (yellow card) 35'	Stadium: José Maria de Campos Maia; Attendance: 5,899; Referee: Felipe Fernandes de Lima

7 October 2026 29	Red Bull Bragantino	1–1	Mirassol	Bragança Paulista
19:30 UTC−3	Eduardo Sasha 51'	Report	João Victor (red card) 28'; André Luis 70'	Stadium: Estádio Cícero de Souza Marques; Attendance: 2,340; Referee: Raphael Claus

11 October 2026 30	Bahia	1–0	Mirassol	Salvador
19:30 UTC−3	Juba 37' (pen.); Jean Lucas (yellow card) 63'	Report	Chico (yellow card) 35'; Walter (yellow card) 36'; Eduardo (yellow card) 78'; Neto Moura (yellow card) 90+4'; Reinaldo (penalty missed) , 90+7'	Stadium: Arena Fonte Nova; Attendance: 28,704; Referee: Ramon Abatti

16 October 2026 31	Mirassol	2–0	Internacional	Mirassol
20:00 UTC−3	Neto Moura (yellow card) 45+5'; Eduardo 48'; André Luis (yellow card) 77', (goal) 87'; Reinaldo (penalty missed) , 90+2'	Report	Matheus Cunha (red card) 15'; Vitinho (yellow card) 43'; Bruno Gomes (yellow card) 57'; Villagra (yellow card) 61'; Carbonero (yellow card) 81'; Mercado (yellow card) 89'; Kauan (yellow card) 90+1'	Stadium: José Maria de Campos Maia; Attendance: 5,931; Referee: Bruno Arleu de Araújo

24 October 2026 32	Mirassol	1–1	São Paulo	Mirassol
16:30 UTC−3	Rafael 7' (o.g.); Eduardo (yellow card) 61'; Willian Machado (yellow card) 70'; Wallisson (yellow card) 83'	Report	Djhordney (yellow card) 17'; Iago (yellow card) 20'; Pedro Lima 39'	Stadium: José Maria de Campos Maia; Attendance: 8,393; Referee: Lucas Casagrande

30 October 2026 33	Corinthians	2–0	Mirassol	São Paulo
20:00 UTC−3	Matheus Bidu 58'; Ramalho (yellow card) 76'; Kaio César 80'; Matheuzinho (yellow card) 83'	Report	Bruno Santos (red card) 24'; Edson Carioca (yellow card) 43'	Stadium: Neo Química Arena; Attendance: 44,151; Referee: Matheus Delgado Candançan

3 November 2026 34	Chapecoense	1–2	Mirassol	Chapecó
19:30 UTC−3	Kauan 12'; Bruno Pacheco (yellow card) 15'; Camilo (yellow card) 22'; Eduardo Doma (yellow card) 82'	Report	Reinaldo (penalty missed) , 20', 45+4' (pen.); Denilson (yellow card) 45+8'; Anderson 57' (o.g.)	Stadium: Arena Condá; Attendance: 5,706; Referee: Lucas Paulo Torezin

14 November 2026 35	Mirassol	0–0	Atlético Mineiro	Mirassol
18:30 UTC−3	Neto Moura (yellow card) 7'; Alesson (yellow card) 47'; José Aldo (yellow card) 90+2'; Edson Carioca (red card) 90+6'	Report	Natanael (yellow card) 90+5'	Stadium: José Maria de Campos Maia; Attendance: 7,277; Referee: Sávio Pereira Sampaio

22 November 2026 36	Fluminense	1–0	Mirassol	Rio de Janeiro
18:30 UTC−3	Riquelme Felipe 90+1', (yellow card) 90+3'	Report	Wallisson (yellow card) 33'; Gustavo Cazonatti (yellow card) 90+4'	Stadium: Maracanã; Referee: Fernando Mendes Filho

29 November 2026 37	Mirassol	v	Athletico Paranaense	Mirassol
18:30 UTC−3				Stadium: José Maria de Campos Maia

=== Campeonato Paulista ===
==== First stage ====
Pos	Team	Pld	W	D	L	GF	GA	GD	Pts
9	Guarani	8	3	3	2	6	7	−1	12
10	Botafogo	8	3	2	3	5	9	−4	11
11	Mirassol	8	2	2	4	10	8	+2	8
12	Primavera	8	2	2	4	14	15	−1	8
13	São Bernardo	8	2	2	4	8	10	−2	8

Source: FPF
Rules for classification: 1) points; 2) wins; 3) goal difference; 4) goals scored; 5) head-to-head results (only between 2 teams); 6) fewest red cards; 7) fewest yellow cards; 8) draw.

Round	1	2	3	4	5	6	7	8
Ground	H	A	A	H	A	H	A	H
Result	W	L	L	D	W	D	L	L
Position	2	6	11	12	6	7	11	11

A = Away; H = Home; W = Win; D = Draw; L = Loss

11 January 2026 1	Mirassol	3–0	São Paulo	Mirassol
20:30 UTC−3	Mugni 7'; Franco 20' (o.g.); José Aldo 89'			Stadium: José Maria de Campos Maia; Attendance: 8,167; Referee: Matheus Delgado Candançan

14 January 2026 2	Primavera	3–1	Mirassol	Indaiatuba
19:00 UTC−3	Gabriel Poveda 5' (pen.); Ligger 16'; Paulo Baya 57'		André Luis 31'	Stadium: Estádio Ítalo Mário Limongi; Attendance: 6,268; Referee: Guilherme Nunes de Santana

17 January 2026 3	Palmeiras	1–0	Mirassol	Barueri
20:30 UTC−3	López 71'			Stadium: Arena Barueri; Referee: Lucas Canetto Bellote

21 January 2026 4	Mirassol	0–0	Red Bull Bragantino	Mirassol
20:00 UTC−3				Stadium: José Maria de Campos Maia; Attendance: 4,652

24 January 2026 5	São Bernardo	0–4	Mirassol	São Bernardo do Campo
15:00 UTC−3			Igor Formiga 2'; Renato Marques 7'; Eduardo 47'; Everton Galdino 90'	Stadium: Estádio 1º de Maio; Referee: Marianna Nanni Batalha

2 February 2026 6	Mirassol	1–1	Novorizontino	Mirassol
15:00 UTC−3	Carlos Eduardo 90+2'		Rômulo Simão 15'	Stadium: José Maria de Campos Maia; Attendance: 3,873

8 February 2026 7	Capivariano	1–0	Mirassol	Capivari
18:30 UTC−3	Vinícius Popó 31'			Stadium: Estádio Carlos Colnaghi; Referee: Fabiano Monteiro dos Santos

15 February 2026 8	Mirassol	1–2	Portuguesa	Mirassol
20:30 UTC−3	Negueba 6'		Maceió 23'; Ewerthon 66'	Stadium: José Maria de Campos Maia; Attendance: 3,541; Referee: Marianna Nanni Batalha

=== Copa do Brasil ===
==== Fifth round ====
22 April 2026 First leg	Red Bull Bragantino (São Paulo (state))	1–1	(São Paulo (state)) Mirassol	Bragança Paulista
21:30	Lucas Barbosa 7'		Lucas Barbosa 45+3' (o.g.)	Stadium: Estádio Cícero de Souza Marques; Attendance: 2,175; Referee: Wagner do Nascimento Magalhães

13 May 2026 Second leg	Mirassol (São Paulo (state))	2–1 (3–2 agg.)	(São Paulo (state)) Red Bull Bragantino	Mirassol
20:30	Tiquinho Soares 20'; Edson Carioca 68'		Herrera 45'	Stadium: José Maria de Campos Maia; Attendance: 3,883; Referee: Rafael Rodrigo Klein

==== Round of 16 ====
2 August 2026 First leg	Mirassol (São Paulo (state))	1–1	(Rio Grande do Sul) Grêmio	Mirassol
18:00 UTC−3	Bruno Santos 19'; Reinaldo (yellow card) 76'; Cazonatti (yellow card) 78'		Amuzu 51'; Enamorado (yellow card) 76'	Stadium: José Maria de Campos Maia; Attendance: 5,592; Referee: Savio Pereira Sampaio

5 August 2026 Second leg	Grêmio (Rio Grande do Sul)	1–0 (2–1 agg.)	(São Paulo (state)) Mirassol	Porto Alegre
19:30 UTC−3	Pavón 37', (yellow card) 87'; Gustavo Martins (yellow card) 45+1'; Weverton (yellow card) 90+6'; Wallace (yellow card) 90+8'		Reinaldo (yellow card) 33'; Denilson (yellow card) 36'; Bruno Santos (yellow card) 45+2'	Stadium: Arena do Grêmio; Attendance: 24,714; Referee: Davi de Oliveira Lacerda

=== Copa Libertadores ===
==== Group stage ====
Group G

Pos	Team	Pld	W	D	L	GF	GA	GD	Pts	Qualification
1	(Ecuador) LDU Quito	6	4	0	2	8	5	+3	12	Advance to round of 16
2	(Brazil) Mirassol	6	4	0	2	7	4	+3	12	Advance to round of 16
3	(Argentina) Lanús	6	3	0	3	3	7	−4	9	Transfer to Copa Sudamericana
4	(Bolivia) Always Ready	6	1	0	5	7	9	−2	3	

Source: CONMEBOL
Rules for classification: 1) Points; 2) Head-to-head points; 3) Head-to-head goal difference; 4) Head-to-head goals scored; 5) Goal difference; 6) Goals scored; 7) Red cards; 8) Yellow cards; 9) Drawing of lots.

8 April 2026 1	Mirassol (Brazil)	1–0	(Argentina) Lanús	Mirassol
19:00 UTC−3	José Aldo (yellow card) 2'; Lucas Oliveira (yellow card) 20'; João Victor 60'; Alesson (yellow card) 72'		Sepúlveda (yellow card) 52'; Guidara (red card) 89'	Stadium: José Maria de Campos Maia; Referee: Jhon Ospina (Colombia)

14 April 2026 2	LDU Quito (Ecuador)	2–0	(Brazil) Mirassol	Quito, Ecuador
21:00 UTC−5	Quiñónez 6'; Segovia (yellow card) 20'; Quintero 34'		Lucas Oliveira (yellow card) 59' (yellow-red card) 82'; Alesson (yellow card) 77'	Stadium: La Casa Blanca; Referee: Roberto Bruno Pérez Gutierrez (Peru)

29 April 2026 3	Mirassol (Brazil)	2–0	(Bolivia) Always Ready	Mirassol
19:00 UTC−3	Eduardo 10'; Alesson (yellow card) 36', (goal) 80'; Igor Formiga (yellow card) 56'; João Victor (red card) 75'; Walter (yellow card) 78'; Denilson (yellow card) 82'		Saucedo (yellow card) 35'; Gómez (yellow card) 38'; Rodriguez (yellow card) 61'	Stadium: José Maria de Campos Maia; Referee: Carlos Ortega (Colombia)

7 May 2026 4	Mirassol (Brazil)	2–0	(Ecuador) LDU Quito	Mirassol
19:00 UTC−3	Lucas Oliveira 47'; Reinaldo 61' (pen.)		Allala (yellow card) 44'; Quiñónez (yellow card) 55'; Segovia (yellow card) 75'	Stadium: José Maria de Campos Maia; Referee: Alexis Herrera (Venezuela)

19 May 2026 5	Always Ready (Bolivia)	1–2	(Brazil) Mirassol	Asunción, Paraguay
21:00 UTC−3	Maraude (yellow card) 14', (goal) 47'; Nava (yellow card) 47'; Saucedo (yellow card) 49'; Cuellar (yellow card) 72'		Shaylon 10'; Carius (yellow card) 39'; Victor Luis (yellow card) 48' (yellow-red card) 90+3'; Carlos Eduardo (yellow card) 52'; Fogaça 82'	Stadium: Estadio La Huerta; Referee: José Burgos (Uruguay)
Note: The scheduled match at the El Alto Municipal Stadium in El Alto was moved due to safety concerns over the Bolivian protests.

26 May 2026 6	Lanús (Argentina)	1–0	(Brazil) Mirassol	Lanús, Argentina
19:00 UTC−3	Medina 22'; Cardozo (yellow card) 34'; Pérez (yellow card) 45+3'		Willian Machado (yellow card) 83'	Stadium: Estadio Ciudad de Lanús – Néstor Díaz Pérez; Referee: Carlos Benítez (Paraguay)

==== Round of 16 ====
13 August 2026 First leg	Mirassol (Brazil)	1–1	(Ecuador) LDU Quito	Mirassol
19:00 UTC−3	Eduardo 15'; Neto Moura (yellow card) 41'; Japa (yellow card) 55'		Quiñonez (yellow card) 35'; Estrada 82'	Stadium: José Maria de Campos Maia; Referee: Alexis Herrera (Venezuela)

20 August 2026 Second leg	LDU Quito (Ecuador)	0–0 (1–1 agg.) (5–4 p)	(Brazil) Mirassol	Quito, Ecuador
17:00 UTC−5	Adé (yellow card) 12'		Denilson (yellow card) 44'; Chico Kim (yellow card) 45+3'; André Luis (yellow card) 59'	Stadium: Estadio Rodrigo Paz Delgado; Referee: Yaél Falcón (Argentina)
	Penalties
	Deyverson (penalty scored); Pretell (penalty scored); Estrada (penalty scored); Allala (penalty scored); Cornejo (penalty scored)		(penalty missed) Victor Luis; (penalty scored) Alesson; (penalty scored) Carlos Eduardo; (penalty scored) Neto Moura; (penalty scored) Bruno Santos

== Statistics ==
=== Appearances ===
No.	Pos	Nat	Player	Total		Série A		Campeonato Paulista		Copa do Brasil		Copa Libertadores	
No.	Pos	Nat	Player	Apps	Goals	Apps	Goals	Apps	Goals	Apps	Goals	Apps	Goals
22	GK	(Brazil) BRA	Walter	45	0	31	0	7	0	1	0	6	0
23	GK	(Brazil) BRA	Alex Muralha	10	0	3	0	1	0	4	0	2	0
6	DF	(Brazil) BRA	Reinaldo	45	3	32	2	6	0	2	0	5	1
12	DF	(Brazil) BRA	Victor Luis	13	0	7	0	1	0	2	0	3	0
2	DF	(Brazil) BRA	Lucas Oliveira	23	2	14	1	2	0	2	0	5	1
32	DF	(Brazil) BRA	Igor Formiga	41	5	32	4	2	1	3	0	4	0
3	DF	(Brazil) BRA	Willian Machado	41	1	29	1	5	0	1	0	6	0
34	DF	(Brazil) BRA	João Victor	48	3	33	2	6	0	3	0	6	1
44	DF	(Brazil) BRA	Gabriel Knesowitsch	13	0	10	0	0	0	2	0	1	0
20	DF	(Brazil) BRA	Daniel Borges	16	0	6	0	4	0	2	0	4	0
18	DF	(Brazil) BRA	Elias	2	0	2	0	0	0	0	0	0	0
33	MF	(Brazil) BRA	Eduardo	41	10	27	7	5	1	3	0	6	2
5	MF	(Brazil) BRA	Japa	9	1	6	1	0	0	1	0	2	0
10	MF	(South Korea) KOR	Chico	22	0	15	0	2	0	2	0	3	0
11	MF	(Brazil) BRA	Negueba	13	3	9	2	2	1	0	0	2	0
19	MF	(Brazil) BRA	Gustavo Silva	8	1	7	1	0	0	1	0	0	0
27	MF	(Brazil) BRA	Denilson	38	1	26	1	2	0	3	0	7	0
7	MF	(Brazil) BRA	Shaylon	40	2	26	1	6	0	2	0	6	1
25	MF	(Brazil) BRA	Neto Moura	40	0	23	0	7	0	4	0	6	0
21	MF	(Brazil) BRA	José Aldo	30	1	19	0	7	1	0	0	4	0
17	MF	(Brazil) BRA	Fernandinho	17	0	13	0	0	0	2	0	2	0
80	MF	(Brazil) BRA	Wallisson Luiz	13	0	10	0	0	0	2	0	1	0
55	MF	(Brazil) BRA	Gustavo Cazonatti	8	0	7	0	0	0	1	0	0	0
9	FW	(Brazil) BRA	André Luis	30	4	21	3	3	1	1	0	5	0
30	FW	(Brazil) BRA	Bruno Santos	21	4	17	3	0	0	2	1	2	0
77	FW	(Brazil) BRA	Alesson	47	1	31	0	5	0	4	0	7	1
96	FW	(Brazil) BRA	Carlos Eduardo	36	2	22	1	7	1	1	0	6	0
99	FW	(Brazil) BRA	Zé Roberto	2	0	2	0	0	0	0	0	0	0
95	FW	(Brazil) BRA	Edson Carioca	33	4	24	3	0	0	4	1	5	0
	FW	(Brazil) BRA	Nathan Fogaça	20	3	10	2	5	0	1	0	4	1
	FW	(Brazil) BRA	Tiquinho Soares	10	1	7	0	0	0	2	1	1	0
	MF	(Argentina) ARG	Lucas Mugni	12	1	0	0	8	1	1	0	3	0
	FW	(Brazil) BRA	Everton Galdino	17	1	8	0	5	1	1	0	3	0
	FW	(Brazil) BRA	Renato Marques	7	1	1	0	6	1	0	0	0	0

=== Goalscorers ===
Rank	Pos	Player	Série A	Campeonato Paulista	Copa do Brasil	Copa Libertadores	Total
1	MF	(Brazil) Eduardo	7	1	0	2	10
2	DF	(Brazil) Igor Formiga	4	1	0	0	5
3	FW	(Brazil) André Luis	3	1	0	0	4
3	FW	(Brazil) Bruno Santos	3	0	1	0	4
3	FW	(Brazil) Edson Carioca	3	0	1	0	4
6	DF	(Brazil) João Victor	2	0	0	1	3
6	FW	(Brazil) Nathan Fogaça	2	0	0	1	3
6	FW	(Brazil) Negueba	2	1	0	0	3
6	DF	(Brazil) Reinaldo	2	0	0	1	3
10	FW	(Brazil) Carlos Eduardo	1	1	0	0	2
10	DF	(Brazil) Lucas Oliveira	1	0	0	1	2
10	MF	(Brazil) Shaylon	1	0	0	1	2
13	FW	(Brazil) Alesson	0	0	0	1	1
13	MF	(Brazil) Denilson	1	0	0	0	1
13	FW	(Brazil) Everton Galdino	0	1	0	0	1
13	MF	(Brazil) Gustavo Silva	1	0	0	0	1
13	MF	(Brazil) José Aldo	0	1	0	0	1
13	MF	(Argentina) Lucas Mugni	0	1	0	0	1
13	FW	(Brazil) Renato Marques	0	1	0	0	1
13	FW	(Brazil) Tiquinho Soares	0	0	1	0	1
13	DF	(Brazil) Willian Machado	1	0	0	0	1
