= 2025 Mirassol Futebol Clube season =

Mirassol Futebol Clube
2025 season
- Manager: Eduardo Barroca (until 21 February); Rafael Guanaes (from 13 March)
- Stadium: Estádio José Maria de Campos Maia
- Série A: 4th
- Campeonato Paulista: Quarter-finals
- Top goalscorer: League: Reinaldo (13); All: Reinaldo (14)
- Average home league attendance: 6,294
- Biggest win: Mirassol 6-0 Água Santa
- Biggest defeat: São Paulo 4-1 Mirassol
Home colours

The 2025 season was Mirassol Futebol Clube's 101st overall and its first season in Brazil's top division after earning promotion. The club also took part in the Campeonato Paulista. Rafael Guanaes won the Best Coach award in the league.

== Squad ==
=== Transfers In ===
Pos.	Player	Transferred from	Fee	Date	Source
MF	(Brazil) José Aldo	(Brazil) Ituano	Loan	2 January 2025	
DF	(Brazil) Daniel Borges	(Brazil) Botafogo	Free	3 January 2025	
DF	(Brazil) Jemmes	(Brazil) Vila Nova	Loan	4 January 2025	
MF	(Brazil) Roni	(Brazil) Corinthians	Undisclosed	10 January 2025	
DF	(Brazil) Alan Empereur	(Brazil) Cuiabá	Undisclosed	14 January 2025	
MF	(Brazil) Cristian Renato	(Brazil) Joinville	Loan return	18 March 2025	
MF	(Brazil) Matheus Bianqui	(Brazil) Coritiba	Loan	24 March 2025	
DF	(Brazil) Gabriel Knesowitsch	(Brazil) Cuiabá	Loan	4 April 2025	
FW	(Brazil) Carlos Eduardo	(Brazil) Vitória	Free	17 June 2025	
DF	(Brazil) Felipe Jonatan	(Brazil) Fortaleza	Loan	25 June 2025	
DF	(Brazil) Jemmes	(Brazil) Vila Nova	R$ 3.8 million	25 June 2025	
MF	(Brazil) Alesson	(Russia) Torpedo Moscow	Loan	1 July 2025	
FW	(Brazil) Francisco da Costa	(Paraguay) Cerro Porteño	Undisclosed	14 July 2025	
DF	(Brazil) João Victor	(Brazil) Vitória	US$500,000	23 July 2025	
MF	(Brazil) Shaylon	(Brazil) Atlético Goianiense	Undiscosed	26 August 2025	

=== Out ===
Pos.	Player	Transferred to	Fee	Date	Source
MF	(Brazil) Cristian Renato	(Brazil) Joinville	Loan	4 January 2025	

== Competitions ==
=== Overall record ===
Competition	First match	Last match	Starting round	Final position	Record							
Competition	First match	Last match	Starting round	Final position	Pld	W	D	L	GF	GA	GD	Win %
Campeonato Brasileiro Série A	29 March 2025	6 December 2025	Matchday 1	4th	38	18	13	7	63	39	+24	47.37
Campeonato Paulista	16 January 2025	2 March 2025	First stage	Quarter-finals	13	5	1	7	21	23	−2	38.46
Total					51	23	14	14	84	62	+22	45.10

Source: Competitions

=== Série A ===
==== League table ====
Pos	Team	Pld	W	D	L	GF	GA	GD	Pts	Qualification or relegation
2	Palmeiras	38	23	7	8	66	33	+33	76	Qualification for Copa Libertadores group stage (Note: Flamengo qualified for the Copa Libertadores group stage by winning the 2025 Copa Libertadores.)
3	Cruzeiro	38	19	13	6	55	31	+24	70	Qualification for Copa Libertadores group stage
4	Mirassol	38	18	13	7	63	39	+24	67	Qualification for Copa Libertadores group stage
5	Fluminense	38	19	7	12	50	39	+11	64	Qualification for Copa Libertadores group stage
6	Botafogo	38	17	12	9	58	38	+20	63	Qualification for Copa Libertadores second stage

Source: CBF
Rules for classification: 1) points; 2) wins; 3) goal difference; 4) goals scored; 5) head-to-head results (only between two teams); 6) fewest red cards; 7) fewest yellow cards; 8) drawing of lots.

==== Results by round ====
Round	1	2	3	4	5	6	7	8	9	10	11	12	13	14	15	16	17	18	19	20	21	22	23	24	25	26	27	28	29	30	31	32	33	34	35	36	37	38
Ground	A	H	A	H	A	H	A	H	A	A	H	A	H	A	H	A	H	H	A	H	A	H	A	H	A	H	A	H	H	A	H	A	H	A	H	A	A	H
Result	L	D	D	W	D	D	L	W	D	W	W	D	W	D	W	W	D	W	L	D	W	W	W	W	L	D	L	W	W	W	D	L	W	D	W	L	W	D
Position	16	17	16	9	11	14	16	12	12	10	8	9	8	9	7	5	5	5	5	5	5	5	4	4	4	4	5	4	4	4	4	4	4	4	4	4	4	4
Points	0	1	2	5	6	7	7	10	11	14	17	18	21	22	25	28	29	32	32	33	36	39	42	45	45	46	46	49	52	55	56	56	59	60	63	63	66	67

A = Away; H = Home; W = Win; D = Draw; L = Loss

==== Matches ====
29 March 2025 1	Cruzeiro	2–1	Mirassol	Belo Horizonte
18:30 UTC−3	Dudu 14'; Gabriel 22'	Report	Lucas Ramon 45+3'	Stadium: Mineirão; Attendance: 40,837; Referee: Alex Gomes Stefano

6 April 2025 2	Mirassol	1–1	Fortaleza	Mirassol
18:30 (UTC-3)	Cristian Renato 90+3'	Report	Emmanuel Martínez 15'	Stadium: Estádio José Maria de Campos Maia; Referee: Sávio Sampaio

13 April 2025 3	Bahia	1–1	Mirassol	Salvador
16:00 (UTC-3)	Erick Pulga 40'	Report	Gabriel 17'	Stadium: Arena Fonte Nova; Referee: Braulio da Silva Machado

16 April 2025 4	Mirassol	4–1	Grêmio	Mirassol
19:00 UTC−3	Daniel Borges 3', 85'; Reinaldo 21' (pen.), 78'	Report	Braithwaite 82'	Stadium: Estádio José Maria de Campos Maia; Referee: Lucas Paulo Torezin

20 April 2025 5	Juventude	2–2	Mirassol	Caxias do Sul
11:00 (UTC-3)	Ênio 24'; Batalla 45+2'	Report	Iury Castilho 34'; Reinaldo 72' (pen.)	Stadium: Estádio Alfredo Jaconi

26 April 2025 6	Mirassol	2–2	Atlético Mineiro	Mirassol
18:30 UTC−3	Edson Carioca 12'; Reinaldo 90+2'	Report	Rony 70'; Hulk 80' (pen.)	Stadium: Estádio José Maria de Campos Maia; Attendance: 4,966; Referee: Davi de Oliveira Lacerda

5 May 2025 7	Red Bull Bragantino	1–0	Mirassol	Bragança Paulista
19:00 UTC−3	Pitta 90+2'	Report		Stadium: Estádio Cícero de Souza Marques; Referee: Lucas Canetto Bellote

10 May 2025 8	Mirassol	2–1	Corinthians	Mirassol
18:30 UTC−3	Edson Carioca 50'; Gabriel 65'	Report	Cacá 45+7'	Stadium: Estádio José Maria de Campos Maia; Attendance: 11,584; Referee: João Vitor Gobi

18 May 2025 9	Internacional	1–1	Mirassol	Porto Alegre
20:30 UTC−3	Ricardo Mathias 77'	Report	Jemmes 8'	Stadium: Beira-Rio; Attendance: 12,150; Referee: Wagner do Nascimento Magalhães

24 May 2025 10	São Paulo	0–2	Mirassol	São Paulo
18:30 UTC−3		Report	Gabriel 53'; Reinaldo 89' (pen.)	Stadium: Morumbi; Attendance: 30,925; Referee: Alex Gomes Stefano

1 June 2025 11	Mirassol	1–0	Sport	Mirassol
11:00 (UTC-3)	Reinaldo 34' (pen.)	Report		Stadium: Estádio José Maria de Campos Maia

16 July 2025 14	Palmeiras	1–1	Mirassol	São Paulo
19:00 UTC−3	Torres 54'	Report	Chico 72'	Stadium: Allianz Parque; Attendance: 38,896; Referee: Sávio Pereira Sampaio

19 July 2025 15	Mirassol	3–0	Santos	Mirassol
18:30 UTC-03:00	Cristian Renato 69'; Reinaldo 79'; Chico 90+2'	Report		Stadium: Estádio José Maria de Campos Maia; Referee: Matheus Delgado Candançan

23 July 2025 16	Ceará	0–2	Mirassol	Fortaleza
19:00 UTC−3		Report	Chico 16'; Negueba 22'	Stadium: Castelão; Referee: Lucas Casagrande

26 July 2025 17	Mirassol	1–1	Vitória	Mirassol
18:30 UTC−3	Edson Carioca 6'	Report	Gabriel Baralhas 13'	Stadium: Estádio José Maria de Campos Maia; Referee: Bruno Arleu de Araújo

2 August 2025 18	Mirassol	3–2	Vasco da Gama	Mirassol
18:30 UTC−3	Negueba 51'; Chico 58'; Alesson 83'	Report	Rodríguez 66'; Vegetti 70'	Stadium: Estádio José Maria de Campos Maia; Referee: Wilton Pereira Sampaio

9 August 2025 19	Flamengo	2–1	Mirassol	Rio de Janeiro
18:30 UTC−3	Pereira 19'; Plata 68'	Report	Gabriel 73'	Stadium: Maracanã; Attendance: 64,018; Referee: Paulo Cesar Zanovelli da Silva

18 August 2025 20	Mirassol	1–1	Cruzeiro	Mirassol
20:00 UTC−3	Negueba 65'	Report	Kaio Jorge 5'	Stadium: José Maria de Campos Maia; Attendance: 6,015; Referee: Bruno Arleu de Araújo

24 August 2025 21	Fortaleza	0–1	Mirassol	Fortaleza
18:30 (UTC-3)			Carioca 17'	Stadium: Estádio Governador Plácido Castelo (Castelão); Referee: Bruno Pereira Vasconcelos

31 August 2025 22	Mirassol	5–1	Bahia	Mirassol
18:30 (UTC-3)	João Victor 2'; Chico 22'; Ronaldo 30' (o.g.); Alesson 59'; Cristian Renato 75'	Report	Rodrigo Nestor 88'	Stadium: Estádio José Maria de Campos Maia

13 September 2025 23	Grêmio	0–1	Mirassol	Porto Alegre
16:00 UTC−3		Report		Stadium: Arena do Grêmio

17 September 2025 12	Botafogo	3–3	Mirassol
19:30

21 September 2025 24	Mirassol	2–0	Juventude
16:00

27 September 2025 25	Atlético Mineiro	1–0	Mirassol
21:00

1 October 2025 26	Mirassol	1–1	Red Bull Bragantino
19:00

4 October 2025 27	Corinthians	3–0	Mirassol
21:00

8 October 2025 13	Mirassol	2–1	Fluminense
21:00

15 October 2025 28	Mirassol	3–1	Internacional
20:00

19 October 2025 29	Mirassol	3–0	São Paulo
18:30

25 October 2025 30	Sport	1–2	Mirassol
18:30

1 November 2025 31	Mirassol	0–0	Botafogo
18:00

6 November 2025 32	Fluminense	1–0	Mirassol
19:30

9 November 2025 33	Mirassol	2–1	Palmeiras
20:30

19 November 2025 34	Santos	1–1	Mirassol
21:30

24 November 2025 35	Mirassol	3–0	Ceará
19:00

29 November 2025 36	Vitória	2–0	Mirassol
16:00

2 December 2025 37	Vasco da Gama	0–2	Mirassol
19:00

6 December 2025 38	Mirassol	3–3	Flamengo
18:30

=== Campeonato Paulista ===
==== Results by round ====
Round	1	2	3	4	5	6	7	8	9	10	11	12
Ground	A	H	A	H	H	A	A	H	H	A	A	H
Result	L	W	W	W	W	W	L	D	L	L	L	L
Position												

A = Away; H = Home; W = Win; D = Draw; L = Loss

16 January 2025 1	Santos	2–1	Mirassol	Santos
21:30 UTC−3				Stadium: Vila Belmiro; Referee: Flavio Rodrigues de Souza

19 January 2025 2	Mirassol	6–0	Água Santa	Mirassol
16:00 UTC−3				Stadium: Estádio José Maria de Campos Maia; Referee: Matheus Delgado Candançan

23 January 2025 3	São Bernardo	1–2	Mirassol
18:30

26 January 2025 4	Mirassol	2–1	Portuguesa
16:00

29 January 2025 5	Mirassol	3–2	Guarani
18:30

1 February 2025 6	Velo Clube	0–1	Mirassol
20:30

5 February 2025 7	São Paulo	4–1	Mirassol
19:30

8 February 2025 8	Mirassol	1–1	Noroeste
16:00

12 February 2025 9	Mirassol	1–2	Ponte Preta
19:30

17 February 2025 10	Novorizontino	2–1	Mirassol
20:00

20 February 2025 11	Red Bull Bragantino	3–0	Mirassol
18:30

23 February 2025 12	Mirassol	2–3	Palmeiras
18:30

==== Knockout stage ====
2 March 2025 Quarter-finals	Corinthians	2–0	Mirassol	São Paulo
18:30 UTC-03:00	Romero 22'; Depay 76'	Report		Stadium: Neo Química Arena; Attendance: 44,436; Referee: Daiane Muniz
