= Denilson (footballer, born 2001) =

Brazilian footballer

Personal information
- Full name: Denilson Alves Borges
- Date of birth: 23 March 2001 (age 25)
- Place of birth: Nazaré do Piauí, Brazil
- Height: 1.80 m (5 ft 11 in)
- Position: Midfielder

Team information
- Current team: Mirassol
- Number: 8

Youth career
- 2016–2018: Itapirense
- 2018–2019: Flamengo
- 2020–2021: Atlético Mineiro

Senior career*
Years	Team	Apps	(Gls)
2021–2022	Bangu	26	(2)
2022–2023	→ Cuiabá (loan)	12	(0)
2023–2025	Cuiabá	122	(3)
2026–	Mirassol	5	(0)
- * Club domestic league appearances and goals as of 9 April 2026

Denilson Alves Borges (born 23 March 2001), simply known as Denilson, is a Brazilian footballer who plays as a midfielder for Mirassol.

== Club career ==
=== Early career ===
Born in Nazaré do Piauí, Piauí, Denilson joined Flamengo's youth setup in 2018, from Itapirense. He left the club in the end of 2019, and subsequently joined Atlético Mineiro.

=== Bangu ===
In June 2021, Denilson moved to Bangu in the Série D. He made his senior debut on 5 June by starting in a 2–1 home loss against Santo André, and scored his first goal on 31 July in a 1–1 draw at Portuguesa.

On 18 October 2021, Denilson renewed his contract with Bangu until 2025.

=== Cuiabá ===
On 14 March 2022, Denilson was loaned to Série A side Cuiabá until April 2023. Initially assigned to the under-23 team, he made his top tier debut on 7 August, coming on as a late substitute for Rafael Gava in a 1–0 away loss against Fluminense.

On 4 January 2023, Denilson signed a permanent five-year deal with Cuiabá, after the club paid R$ 320,000 for 60% of his economic rights.

== Personal life ==
Denilson's younger brother Denis is also a footballer and a midfielder, who plays for Portuguesa.

== Career statistics ==
As of 3 January 2025

Club	Season	League			State League		Cup		Continental		Other		Total	
Club	Season	Division	Apps	Goals	Apps	Goals	Apps	Goals	Apps	Goals	Apps	Goals	Apps	Goals
Bangu	2021	Série D	15	1	—		—		—		2 (Note: Appearance(s) in Copa Rio)	0	17	1
Bangu	2022	Carioca	—		11	1	—		—		—		11	1
Bangu	Total		15	1	11	1	—		—		2	0	28	2
Cuiabá	2022	Série A	12	0	—		—		—		0	0	12	0
Cuiabá	2023	Série A	33	1	8	1	1	0	—		4 (Note: Appearance(s) in Copa Verde)	0	46	2
Cuiabá	2024	Série A	33	0	3	0	2	0	5 (Note: Appearance(s) in Copa Sudamericana)	0	2	0	45	0
Cuiabá	Total		78	1	11	1	3	0	5	0	6	0	103	2
Career total			93	2	22	2	3	0	5	0	8	0	131	4

== Honours ==
Cuiabá

- Campeonato Brasileiro de Aspirantes: 2022
- Campeonato Mato-Grossense: 2023, 2024
