= Jemmes =

Brazilian footballer

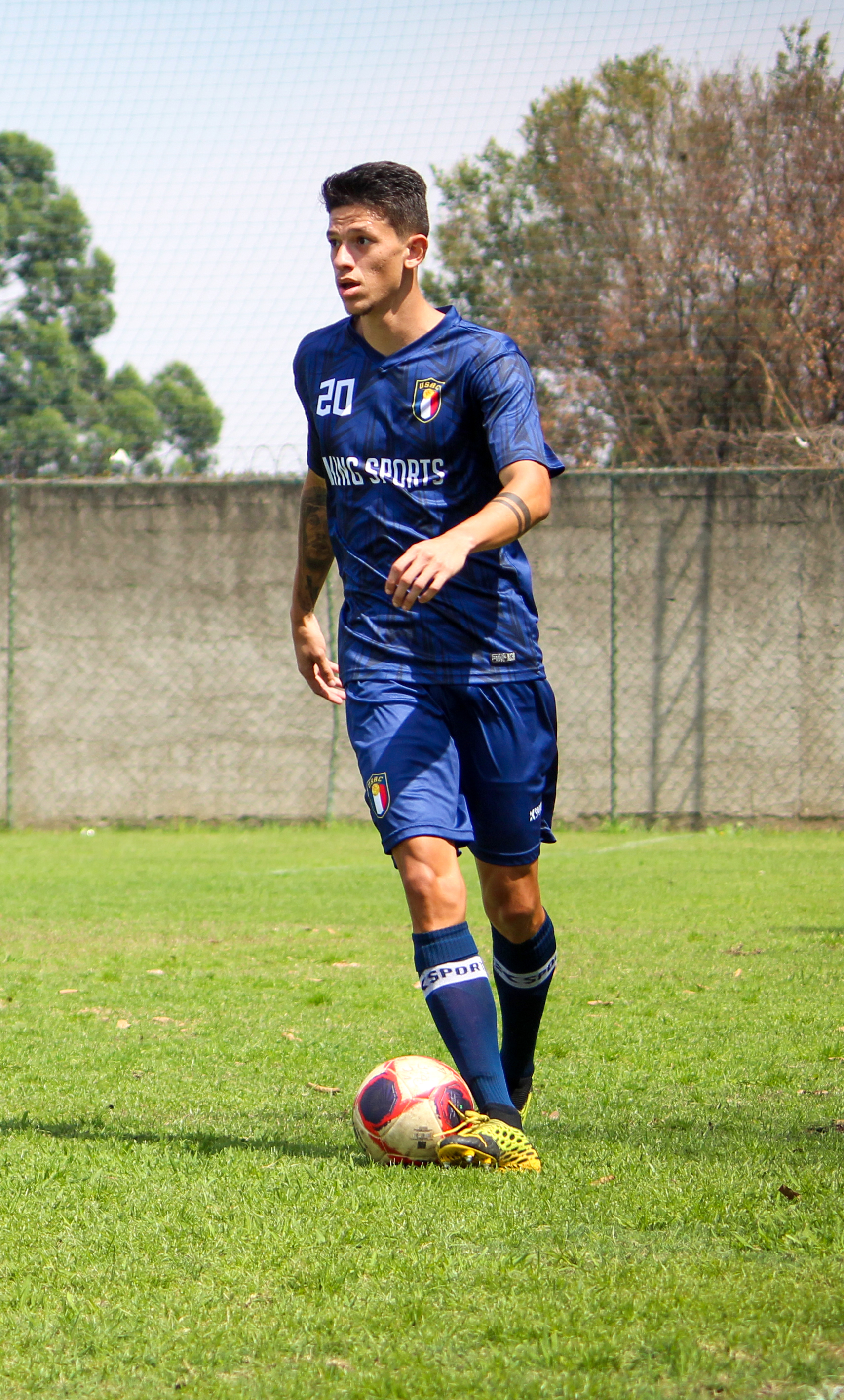
- Jemmes playing for União Suzano in 2021

Personal information
- Full name: Jemmes Bruno Ribeiro da Silva
- Date of birth: 9 April 2000 (age 26)
- Place of birth: Rosário Oeste, Brazil
- Height: 1.87 m (6 ft 2 in)
- Position: Centre-back

Team information
- Current team: Fluminense
- Number: 3

Youth career
- 2017–2019: Taquaritinga
- 2019: → Capivariano (loan)
- 2020: Capivariano

Senior career*
Years	Team	Apps	(Gls)
2019	Taquaritinga	11	(0)
2020–2024	Capivariano	75	(1)
2021	→ União Suzano (loan)	8	(1)
2022	→ Rio Branco-SP (loan)	8	(1)
2023	→ Athletic-MG (loan)	16	(2)
2024	→ Vila Nova (loan)	35	(3)
2025	Vila Nova	0	(0)
2025	→ Mirassol (loan)	14	(1)
2025	Mirassol	25	(1)
2026–	Fluminense	15	(0)
- * Club domestic league appearances and goals as of 6 April 2026

Jemmes Bruno Ribeiro da Silva (born 9 April 2000), simply known as Jemmes, is a Brazilian footballer who plays as a centre-back for Fluminense.

== Career ==
=== Early career ===
Born in Rosário Oeste, Mato Grosso, Jemmes made his senior debut with Taquaritinga in the 2019 Campeonato Paulista Segunda Divisão, before moving on loan to the under-20 side of Capivariano in September of that year. He subsequently signed a permanent deal with the club, and became a regular starter in the 2021 season.

Jemmes also served loans at União Suzano and Rio Branco-SP, before returning to Capivariano for the 2023 campaign and helping the club to win the year's Campeonato Paulista Série A3. On 19 May 2023, he moved to Série D side Athletic-MG also on loan, and achieved promotion with the side.

Jemmes returned to Capi for the 2024 season, and was an undisputed starter as the club narrowly avoided relegation.

=== Vila Nova ===
On 11 April 2024, Jemmes was announced at Série B side Vila Nova also in a temporary deal. On 29 October, he agreed to a permanent deal with Vila, effective as of the following 1 January, after the club activated his R$ 500,000 buyout clause.

=== Mirassol ===
On 4 January 2025, Jemmes was loaned to Série A newcomers Mirassol for one year. He made his top tier debut on 29 March, starting in a 2–1 away loss to Cruzeiro.

Jemmes and scored his first goal in the top tier on 18 May 2025, in a 1–1 draw at Internacional. On 25 June, Mirassol activated his buyout clause, with Vila Nova keeping 30% of his economic rights.

=== Fluminense ===
On 29 December 2025, Fluminense announced the signing of Jemmes on a five-year contract.

== Career statistics ==
As of 30 December 2025.

Club	Season	League			State League		Cup		Continental		Other		Total	
Club	Season	Division	Apps	Goals	Apps	Goals	Apps	Goals	Apps	Goals	Apps	Goals	Apps	Goals
Taquaritinga	2019	Paulista 2ª Divisão	—		11	0	—		—		—		11	0
Capivariano	2020	Paulista A3	—		1	0	—		—		—		1	0
Capivariano	2021	Paulista A3	—		15	0	—		—		—		15	0
Capivariano	2022	Paulista A3	—		20	0	—		—		—		20	0
Capivariano	2023	Paulista A3	—		24	0	—		—		—		24	0
Capivariano	2024	Paulista A2	—		15	1	—		—		—		15	1
Capivariano	Total		—		75	1	—		—		—		75	1
União Suzano (loan)	2021	Paulista 2ª Divisão	—		8	1	—		—		—		8	1
Rio Branco-SP (loan)	2022	Paulista 2ª Divisão	—		8	1	—		—		—		8	1
Athletic-MG (loan)	2023	Série D	16	2	—		—		—		—		16	2
Vila Nova	2024	Série B	35	3	—		—		—		—		35	3
Mirassol	2025	Série A	37	2	3	0	—		—		—		40	2
Fluminense	2026	Série A	0	0	0	0	0	0	0	0	—		0	0
Career total			88	7	105	3	0	0	0	0	0	0	193	10

== Honours ==
Capivariano

- Campeonato Paulista Série A3: 2023

União Suzano

- Campeonato Paulista Série A4: 2021
