= José Aldo (footballer) =

Brazilian footballer (born 1998)

Personal information
- Full name: José Aldo Soares de Oliveira Filho
- Date of birth: 25 July 1998 (age 28)
- Place of birth: Surubim, Brazil
- Height: 1.74 m (5 ft 9 in)
- Position: Midfielder

Team information
- Current team: Mirassol
- Number: 21

Youth career
- 2013–2019: Guarani de Palhoça
- 2015–2018: → Palmeiras (loan)
- 2018–2019: → Internacional (loan)

Senior career*
Years	Team	Apps	(Gls)
2019–2023	Guarani de Palhoça	0	(0)
2019–2020	→ Internacional (loan)	1	(0)
2020–2021	→ Portimonense (loan)	0	(0)
2021	→ Pelotas (loan)	7	(0)
2021–2022	→ Paysandu (loan)	39	(5)
2023	→ Ituano (loan)	37	(0)
2024–2025	Ituano	37	(6)
2025	→ Mirassol (loan)	37	(0)
2026–	Mirassol	15	(1)
- * Club domestic league appearances and goals as of 9 April 2026

José Aldo Soares de Oliveira Filho (born 25 July 1998), known as José Aldo or sometimes as Aldo Filho, is a Brazilian professional footballer who plays as a midfielder for Mirassol.

== Career ==
=== Early career ===
Born in Surubim, Pernambuco, José Aldo joined Palmeiras' youth setup in 2015, after being the top goalscorer of the U17 Campeonato Catarinense for Guarani de Palhoça. In April 2018, he agreed to a one-year loan deal with Internacional, and was initially assigned to the youth setup.

Promoted to the first team in May 2019, José Aldo's loan was extended until the end of the season, and he made his first team – and Série A – debut on 15 September, in a 3–1 win over Atlético Mineiro. The following 1 January, his loan was extended until June 2020, with a buyout clause.

On 7 July 2020, José Aldo moved abroad and agreed to a one-year loan deal with Portuguese Primeira Liga side Portimonense. After only appearing for the under-23 team, he returned to his home country and joined Pelotas in March 2021.

=== Paysandu ===
On 1 September 2021, José Aldo agreed to a deal with Paysandu, still owned by Guarani de Palhoça. An immediate first-choice, his loan was extended on 20 December, and helped the club to win the 2022 Copa Verde.

On 24 November 2022, José Aldo left Papão after appearing in 50 matches and scoring six goals.

=== Ituano ===
In November 2022, shortly after leaving Paysandu, José Aldo agreed to a one-year loan deal with Ituano. On 4 January 2024, after being regularly used, he renewed his link with the club.

=== Mirassol ===
On 26 December 2024, Mirassol announced the signing of José Aldo on a one-year loan from Ituano. Roughly one year later, after helping the club to qualify to the 2026 Copa Libertadores, he signed a permanent deal with the club.

== Career statistics ==
As of 29 January 2026.

Club	Season	League			State League (Note: Includes Campeonato Gaúcho, Campeonato Paraense, Campeonato Paulista.)		Cup (Note: Includes Copa do Brasil.)		Continental		Other		Total	
Club	Season	Division	Apps	Goals	Apps	Goals	Apps	Goals	Apps	Goals	Apps	Goals	Apps	Goals
Internacional	2019	Série A	1	0	—		—		—		—		1	0
Portimonense	2020–21	Primeira Liga	0	0	—		—		—		—		0	0
Pelotas	2021	Gaúcho	—		7	0	—		—		—		7	0
Paysandu	2021	Série C	5	0	—		—		—		3 (Note: Appearance(s) in Copa Verde)	1	8	1
Paysandu	2022	Série C	22	4	12	1	2	0	—		6	0	42	5
Paysandu	Total		27	4	12	1	2	0	—		9	1	50	6
Ituano	2023	Série B	27	0	10	0	3	0	—		—		40	0
Ituano	2024	Série B	29	6	8	0	—		—		—		37	6
Ituano	Total		56	6	18	0	3	0	—		—		77	6
Mirassol	2025	Série A	30	0	7	0	—		—		—		37	0
Mirassol	2026	Série A	2	0	6	1	0	0	0	0	—		8	1
Mirassol	Total		32	0	13	1	0	0	0	0	—		45	1
Career total			116	10	50	2	5	0	0	0	9	1	180	13

== Honours ==
Internacional

- Campeonato Brasileiro Sub-23: 2019

Paysandu

- Copa Verde: 2022
