= Cristian Renato =

Brazilian footballer (born 1997)

Personal information
- Full name: Cristian Renato Gonçalves Riquelme
- Date of birth: 18 February 2000 (age 26)
- Place of birth: Ponta Porã, Brazil
- Height: 1.89 m (6 ft 2 in)
- Position: Forward

Team information
- Current team: Busan IPark
- Number: 99

Youth career
- 2015: Lemense
- 2016: XV de Jaú
- 2017–2018: Grêmio Osasco
- 2019: Marília
- 2019–2021: Juventus-SP

Senior career*
Years	Team	Apps	(Gls)
2020–2022	Juventus-SP	21	(0)
2022–2025	Mirassol	82	(9)
2023	→ Marcílio Dias (loan)	8	(0)
2024	→ Boavista (loan)	11	(2)
2024	→ Figueirense (loan)	13	(1)
2025	→ Joinville (loan)	13	(5)
2026–	Busan IPark	19	(7)
- * Club domestic league appearances and goals as of 5 August 2026

Cristian Renato Gonçalves Riquelme (born 18 February 2000), known as Cristian Renato or just Cristian, is a Brazilian footballer who plays as a forward for K League 2 side Busan IPark.

== Career ==
Born in Ponta Porã, Mato Grosso do Sul, Cristian represented Lemense, XV de Jaú, Grêmio Osasco, Marília and Juventus-SP as a youth. He made his senior debut with the latter in the 2020 Copa Paulista as a centre-back, and later moved to a defensive midfielder position.

On 2 April 2022, after being a regular starter for Juventus in the Campeonato Paulista Série A2, Cristian signed for Mirassol. On 21 December, after helping the latter to achieve promotion from the Série C as champions, he was loaned to Marcílio Dias.

Back to Mirassol for the 2023 Série B, Cristian was regularly used for the side before joining Boavista also on loan on 8 January 2024. On 5 April, he was announced at Figueirense also in a temporary deal.

On 27 August 2024, Cristian's loan with Figueira was cut short, and he returned to Mirassol to feature sparingly as the club achieved a first-ever promotion to the Série A. On 7 January 2025, he joined Joinville on loan.

Back to Mirassol in March 2025, Cristian made his top tier debut on 6 April of that year, replacing Fabrício Daniel and scoring the equalizer in a 1–1 home draw against Fortaleza; his goal assured the club's first-ever point in the first division. Despite being a backup option, he featured regularly as the club qualified to the 2026 Copa Libertadores.

On 14 January 2026, Cristian moved abroad for the first time in his career, after being announced at Busan IPark of the K League 2.

== Career statistics ==
As of 11 May 2026

Club	Season	League			State League		Cup		Continental		Other		Total	
Club	Season	Division	Apps	Goals	Apps	Goals	Apps	Goals	Apps	Goals	Apps	Goals	Apps	Goals
Juventus-SP	2020	Paulista A2	—		—		—		—		2 (Note: Appearance(s) in Copa Paulista)	0	2	0
Juventus-SP	2021	Paulista A2	—		7	0	—		—		4	0	11	0
Juventus-SP	2022	Paulista A2	—		14	0	—		—		—		14	0
Juventus-SP	Total		—		21	0	—		—		6	0	27	0
Mirassol	2022	Série C	11	1	—		—		—		—		11	1
Mirassol	2023	Série B	32	3	—		—		—		7	3	39	6
Mirassol	2024	Série B	7	0	—		—		—		—		7	0
Mirassol	2025	Série A	32	5	—		—		—		—		32	5
Mirassol	Total		82	9	—		—		—		7	3	89	12
Marcílio Dias (loan)	2023	Catarinense	—		8	0	1	0	—		1 (Note: Appearance(s) in Recopa Catarinense)	0	10	0
Boavista (loan)	2024	Carioca	—		11	2	—		—		—		11	2
Figueirense (loan)	2024	Série C	13	1	—		—		—		—		13	1
Joinville (loan)	2025	Série D	0	0	13	5	—		—		—		13	5
Busan IPark	2026	K League 2	11	4	—		—		—		—		11	4
Career total			106	14	53	7	1	0	0	0	14	3	174	24

== Honours ==
Mirassol

- Campeonato Brasileiro Série C: 2022
