= Elias (footballer, born 1999) =

Brazilian footballer

Personal information
- Full name: Elias Lira Nogueira Júnior
- Date of birth: 16 July 1999 (age 27)
- Place of birth: Recife, Brazil
- Height: 1.81 m (5 ft 11 in)
- Position: Right-back

Team information
- Current team: Mirassol (on loan from Vila Nova)

Youth career
- Sport Recife
- 2019: → Athletico Paranaense (loan)

Senior career*
Years	Team	Apps	(Gls)
2017–2023	Sport Recife	4	(0)
2019–2020	→ Athletico Paranaense (loan)	2	(0)
2020–2021	→ Botafogo-PB (loan)	0	(0)
2021	→ Santo André (loan)	8	(0)
2022	→ Botafogo-PB (loan)	21	(0)
2023	→ Figueirense (loan)	28	(1)
2024–2025	Primavera	13	(1)
2024–2025	→ Vila Nova (loan)	75	(3)
2026–	Vila Nova	10	(0)
2026–	→ Mirassol (loan)	0	(0)
- * Club domestic league appearances and goals as of 14 April 2026

Elias Lira Nogueira Júnior (born 16 July 1999), simply known as Elias, is a Brazilian footballer who plays as a right-back for Mirassol, on loan from Vila Nova.

== Career ==
Born in Recife, Pernambuco, Elias was a youth product of hometown side Sport Recife. He made his first team debut on 3 April 2017, starting in a 2–2 Campeonato Pernambucano home draw against Salgueiro, as the club lined up mainly youth players.

Elias subsequently returned to the youth sides, being rarely used in the main squad, and renewed his contract until 2022 on 25 March 2019. On 23 May, however, he was loaned to Athletico Paranaense as a part of the deal which saw Éder move in the opposite direction.

Elias returned to Sport in May 2020, but was loaned to Botafogo-PB on 4 November. The following 25 May, he moved to Santo André also in a temporary deal.

On 10 March 2022, Elias returned to Belo again on loan. A regular starter, he moved to fellow league team Figueirense on 10 December, where he was also a first-choice.

Elias joined Primavera ahead of the 2024 season, before being loaned to Série B side Vila Nova on 2 April of that year.

== Career statistics ==
As of 12 November 2024.

Club	Season	League			State League		Cup		Continental		Other		Total	
Club	Season	Division	Apps	Goals	Apps	Goals	Apps	Goals	Apps	Goals	Apps	Goals	Apps	Goals
Sport Recife	2017	Série A	0	0	1	0	0	0	—		0	0	1	0
Sport Recife	2018	Série A	0	0	—		—		—		—		0	0
Sport Recife	2019	Série B	0	0	—		—		—		—		0	0
Sport Recife	2020	Série A	0	0	1	0	0	0	—		0	0	1	0
Sport Recife	2021	Série A	0	0	1	0	0	0	—		0	0	1	0
Sport Recife	2022	Série B	0	0	1	0	0	0	—		0	0	1	0
Sport Recife	Total		0	0	4	0	0	0	—		0	0	4	0
Athletico Paranaense (loan)	2020	Série A	0	0	2	0	0	0	—		—		2	0
Botafogo-PB (loan)	2020	Série C	0	0	—		—		—		1 (Note: Appearance(s) in Copa do Nordeste)	0	1	0
Santo André (loan)	2021	Série D	8	0	—		—		—		—		8	0
Botafogo-PB (loan)	2022	Série C	15	0	6	0	—		—		2	0	23	0
Figueirense (loan)	2023	Série C	17	1	11	0	—		—		8 (Note: Appearance(s) in Copa Santa Catarina)	1	36	2
Primavera	2024	Paulista A2	—		13	1	—		—		—		13	1
Vila Nova (loan)	2024	Série B	30	2	—		—		—		—		30	2
Career total			70	3	36	1	0	0	0	0	11	1	117	5

== Honours ==
Sport Recife

- Campeonato Pernambucano: 2017

Athletico Paranaense

- Campeonato Paranaense: 2020
