= Rafael Guanaes =

Brazilian football manager (born 1981)

Personal information
- Full name: Rafael Silva Guanaes
- Date of birth: 27 March 1981 (age 45)
- Place of birth: São Paulo, Brazil
- Position: Midfielder

Team information
- Current team: Mirassol (head coach)

Youth career
- Palmeiras
- Corinthians
- Nacional-SP

College career
Years	Team	Apps	(Gls)
1999–2000	Campbell Fighting Camels	30	(7)

Senior career*
Years	Team	Apps	(Gls)
1999	Nacional-SP		
2010	Joseense	3	(0)

Managerial career
- 2010: Joseense
- 2011–2014: Joseense
- 2014: União São João
- 2015–2016: São Carlos
- 2017: Monte Azul
- 2018: Votuporanguense
- 2019–2021: Athletico Paranaense U23
- 2021: Sampaio Corrêa
- 2021–2022: Tombense
- 2022: Novorizontino
- 2023–2024: Operário Ferroviário
- 2025: Atlético Goianiense
- 2025–: Mirassol
- * Club domestic league appearances and goals

Rafael Silva Guanaes (born 27 March 1981) is a Brazilian football coach and former player who played as a midfielder. He is the current head coach of Mirassol.

== Career ==
Born in São Paulo, Guanaes played for Palmeiras, Corinthians and Nacional-SP as a youth. He also played for the Campbell University's soccer team Campbell Fighting Camels during the 1999 and 2000 campaigns, Nacional and Joseense.

On 16 June 2010, Guanaes was named head coach of Joseense for the remainder of the year, replacing sacked Ricardo Longhi, but only lasted two matches (two defeats) before Longhi asked to return to the role, and he subsequently became a director of football. He returned to coaching duties ahead of the 2011 season, and achieved promotion to Campeonato Paulista Série A3 with the club in 2012 before being appointed in charge of União São João on 6 August 2014.

Guanaes was sacked by União on 9 September 2014, but took over São Carlos on 2 December, for the ensuing campaign. He won the Campeonato Paulista Segunda Divisão in the following year with the club, but left in November 2016 as his contract expired.

On 18 November 2016, Guanaes was appointed Monte Azul head coach. He took over Votuporanguense on 29 September of the following year, and won the 2018 Copa Paulista with the latter club.

On 2 January 2019, Guanaes was named manager of Athletico Paranaense's under-23 side. He won the 2019 Campeonato Paranaense with the club, and later went on to work also with the under-20s.

On 5 February 2021, Guanaes left Athletico to take over Série B side Sampaio Corrêa. Dismissed on 22 April, he replaced Bruno Pivetti at the helm of Tombense four days later.

Guanaes led Tombense to their first-ever promotion to the Série B, but was sacked on 22 February 2022, with the club threatened with relegation in the 2022 Campeonato Mineiro. He then worked for a short period as a permanent assistant manager at Cruzeiro before taking over second division side Novorizontino on 21 June.

On 3 September 2022, Guanaes was sacked by Novorizontino. On 1 November, he was announced as manager of Operário Ferroviário, recently relegated to the third level, for the upcoming season.

Guanaes led the Fantasma to a promotion to the second division in his first season, but announced his departure from the club at the end of the year on 18 November 2024. On 2 December, he was named Atlético Goianiense head coach for the upcoming season, but was sacked on 2 March 2025.

On 13 March 2025, Guanaes was named head coach of Série A newcomers Mirassol. On 25 November, he extended his contract until the end of the 2026 season.

== Managerial statistics ==
As of 14 November 2026

Managerial record by team and tenure
Team	Nat.	From	To	Record								Ref
Team	Nat.	From	To	G	W	D	L	GF	GA	GD	Win %	Ref
Joseense	(Brazil)	16 June 2010	24 June 2010	2	0	0	2	0	6	−6	0.00	
Joseense	(Brazil)	1 January 2011	6 August 2014	89	36	25	28	118	91	+27	40.45	
União São João	(Brazil)	6 August 2014	9 September 2014	6	3	0	3	7	7	+0	50.00	
São Carlos	(Brazil)	2 December 2014	8 November 2016	74	37	19	18	110	69	+41	50.00	
Monte Azul	(Brazil)	18 November 2016	31 May 2017	23	10	7	6	32	26	+6	43.48	
Votuporanguense	(Brazil)	29 September 2017	8 December 2018	37	17	9	11	54	44	+10	45.95	
Athletico Paranaense U23	(Brazil)	2 January 2019	30 April 2019	15	8	3	4	28	13	+15	53.33	
Sampaio Corrêa	(Brazil)	5 February 2021	22 April 2021	17	6	6	5	21	16	+5	35.29	
Tombense	(Brazil)	26 April 2021	22 February 2022	35	11	14	10	37	38	−1	31.43	
Novorizontino	(Brazil)	21 June 2022	3 September 2022	15	5	4	6	17	17	+0	33.33	
Operário Ferroviário	(Brazil)	1 November 2022	18 November 2024	95	45	23	27	102	76	+26	47.37	
Atlético Goianiense	(Brazil)	2 December 2024	2 March 2025	13	5	6	2	16	10	+6	38.46	
Mirassol	(Brazil)	13 March 2025	present	92	35	28	29	123	103	+20	38.04	
Career total				513	218	144	151	665	517	+148	42.50	—

== Honours ==
=== Coach ===
São Carlos

- Campeonato Paulista Segunda Divisão: 2015

Votuporanguense

- Copa Paulista: 2018

Athletico Paranaense

- Campeonato Paranaense: 2019

Individual

- Bola de Prata Best Head Coach: 2025
- Campeonato Brasileiro Série A Coach of the Year: 2025
