= Lucas Oliveira (footballer, born 1996) =

Brazilian footballer

Personal information
- Full name: Lucas da Cruz Oliveira
- Date of birth: 2 February 1996 (age 30)
- Place of birth: Rio de Janeiro, Brazil
- Height: 1.87 m (6 ft 2 in)
- Position: Centre back

Team information
- Current team: Mirassol
- Number: 2

Youth career
- 2014–2015: Tigres do Brasil

Senior career*
Years	Team	Apps	(Gls)
2014–2017	Tigres do Brasil	33	(2)
2018	Bangu	11	(0)
2018–2022	Atlético Goianiense	116	(8)
2022	→ Cruzeiro (loan)	43	(1)
2023–	Cruzeiro	26	(2)
2024	→ Valladolid (loan)	11	(0)
2024	→ Kyoto Sanga (loan)	5	(0)
2025	Vasco da Gama	13	(0)
2026-	Mirassol	3	(0)
- * Club domestic league appearances and goals as of 9 April 2026

Lucas da Cruz Oliveira (born 2 February 1996), commonly known as Lucas Oliveira or simply Oliveira, is a Brazilian footballer who plays as centre-back for Mirassol.

== Honours ==
Atlético Goianiense

- Campeonato Goiano: 2019, 2020

Cruzeiro

- Campeonato Brasileiro Série B: 2022
