= Gustavo Cazonatti =

Brazilian football player

Personal information
- Full name: Gustavo Cazonatti
- Date of birth: 3 July 1996 (age 30)
- Place of birth: Florianópolis, Brazil
- Height: 1.78 m (5 ft 10 in)
- Position: Midfielder

Team information
- Current team: Mirassol
- Number: 55

Youth career
- 2015–2016: Santos

Senior career*
Years	Team	Apps	(Gls)
2017–2020	Rio Claro	2	(0)
2017–2019	→ Real Massamá (loan)	62	(5)
2019–2020	→ Mafra (loan)	8	(0)
2020	Brasil de Pelotas	11	(0)
2021–2024	Tombense	28	(0)
2022	→ Criciúma (loan)	7	(0)
2023	→ Chapecoense (loan)	41	(3)
2024	→ Sporting Cristal (loan)	32	(3)
2025–2026	Sporting Cristal	22	(3)
2026–	Mirassol	4	(0)
- * Club domestic league appearances and goals as of 11:45, 25 August 2026 (UTC)

Gustavo Cazonatti (born 3 July 1996) is a Brazilian footballer who plays as a midfielder for Campeonato Brasileiro Série A club Mirassol.

A youth player at Santos, he played in Série B for Brasil de Pelotas, Tombense, Criciúma and Chapecoense, while winning promotion from Série C with Tombense in 2021. Abroad, he played in Portugal's second tier for Real and Mafra, and in the Peruvian Primera División for Sporting Cristal.

== Career ==
=== Santos ===
Born in Florianópolis in the state of Santa Catarina, Cazonatti began his career in the youth ranks of Santos FC. He was called up for one first-team match, a 3–0 home win over Santos Futebol Clube (AP) in the first round of the Copa do Brasil on 28 April 2016; he was an unused substitute.

=== Portugal ===
In 2017, Cazonatti signed for Rio Claro Futebol Clube with whom he played two games in the Campeonato Paulista, and in July that year he signed for Real S.C. who were newly promoted to Portugal's second tier. He played 31 games as the team from Queluz were relegated, and scored his first senior goal as the only one of a home win over U.D. Oliveirense on 25 March.

After one more season in the third tier with Real, Cazonatti moved in July 2019 to C.D. Mafra one division higher, also in the Lisbon District. With only 12 appearances to his name, he returned to his country and signed for Grêmio Esportivo Brasil of the Campeonato Brasileiro Série B in August 2020.

=== Tombense ===
In February 2021, Cazonatti returned to the state of São Paulo and signed for Maringá Futebol Clube. Later in the same year he joined Tombense Futebol Clube and helped the club to promotion from the Campeonato Brasileiro Série B as runners-up to Ituano FC.

Having been affected by injuries, Cazonatti then went back to the state of his birth and signed for Criciúma Esporte Clube of Série B in July 2022. In December, he was loaned by Tombense for the following year to Associação Chapecoense de Futebol, also in Santa Catarina. He scored his first three goals in Brazilian football in the year's Série B: the game's only on 18 July at home to Ituano in which he was sent off in added time for catching opponent Zé Carlos while attempting a bicycle kick, and both of a 2–1 win away to Criciúma on 13 October.

=== Sporting Cristal ===
At the start of 2024, 27-year-old Cazonatti was loaned to Sporting Cristal in the Peruvian Primera División with the option to purchase. He joined compatriots Ignácio and manager Enderson Moreira at the Lima-based club. He played for the first time in continental football, in a 6–1 loss away to Club Always Ready of Bolivia in the Copa Libertadores, receiving a yellow card in a game played at over 4,000 metres altitude. Playing for the first time in a national top flight, he played 32 games and scored 3 goals, including the opener of a 2–1 home win over city rivals and eventual champions Universitario de Deportes on 23 October.

In November 2024, Sporting Cristal made Cazonatti's deal permanent on a contract until the start of 2027.

=== Mirassol ===
On 23 July 2026, Cazonatti signed for Mirassol Futebol Clube in the Campeonato Brasileiro Série A. He arrived on a free transfer, with Sporting Cristal retaining 50% of his next transfer fee.
