= Diego Hernández =

Diego Hernández may refer to:

== People ==
- Diego Hernández de Serpa (1510–1570), Spanish conquistador and explorer
- Diego E. Hernández (1934–2017), U.S. Navy officer
- Diego Hernandez (politician) (born 1986/87), Oregon state representative
- Diego Hernández (footballer, born 1993), Mexican football winger
- Diego Suárez Hernández (born 1994), Spanish footballer
- Diego Hernández (footballer, born 1998), Mexican football centre-back for Racing Porto Palmeiras
- Diego Hernández (footballer, born 1999), Mexican football winger for UAT
- Diego Hernández (Uruguayan footballer) (born 2000), Uruguayan football attacking midfielder for Botafogo

== Places ==
- Diego Hernández, Yauco, Puerto Rico, a barrio of Puerto Rico
