= Bruno Santos (footballer, born 1996) =

Brazilian footballer

Personal information
- Full name: Bruno Santos de Oliveira
- Date of birth: 18 November 1996 (age 29)
- Place of birth: Salvador, Brazil
- Height: 1.85 m (6 ft 1 in)
- Position: Forward

Team information
- Current team: Mirassol
- Number: 30

Youth career
- 2015: Marília
- 2016–2017: Nacional-SP

Senior career*
| Years | Team | Apps | (Gls) |
| 2016–2017 | Nacional-SP | 4 | (2) |
| 2017–2018 | Itaboraí | 41 | (7) |
| 2018 | Flamengo-SP | 3 | (1) |
| 2019 | America-RJ | 1 | (0) |
| 2019 | Corumbaense | 4 | (1) |
| 2019 | Itaboraí | 5 | (2) |
| 2019 | Serra Macaense | 10 | (2) |
| 2020 | Nova Iguaçu | 12 | (3) |
| 2020 | → Goiânia (loan) | 14 | (3) |
| 2021 | Madureira | 13 | (0) |
| 2021– | Artsul | 15 | (5) |
| 2022 | → Portuguesa-RJ (loan) | 10 | (3) |
| 2022 | → Brusque (loan) | 7 | (0) |
| 2022 | → Volta Redonda (loan) | 22 | (14) |
| 2023 | → Primavera-SP (loan) | 14 | (6) |
| 2023 | → São Bernardo FC (loan) | 18 | (5) |
| 2024 | → SC Sagamihara (loan) | 12 | (2) |
| 2024–2025 | → Volta Redonda (loan) | 37 | (10) |
| 2025 | → Guarani (loan) | 16 | (6) |
| 2026 | Londrina | 16 | (11) |
| 2026– | Mirassol | 5 | (1) |
- * Club domestic league appearances and goals as of 5 July 2026

Bruno Santos de Oliveira (born 18 November 1996), simply known as Bruno Santos, is a Brazilian professional footballer who plays as a forward for Mirassol.

== Career ==
Having played in the youth teams of Marília and Nacional, Santos began his professional career in 2016. The player gained notoriety particularly for his great performances with Volta Redonda, being Série C champion in 2024, and with Guarani in 2025. On September 24, in the match against Brusque, Santos reached 35.7 km/h during a sprint.

== Honours ==
Volta Redonda

- Campeonato Brasileiro Série C: 2024
- Copa Rio: 2022
- Campeonato Carioca Série A2: 2022
