= Neto Moura =

Brazilian footballer

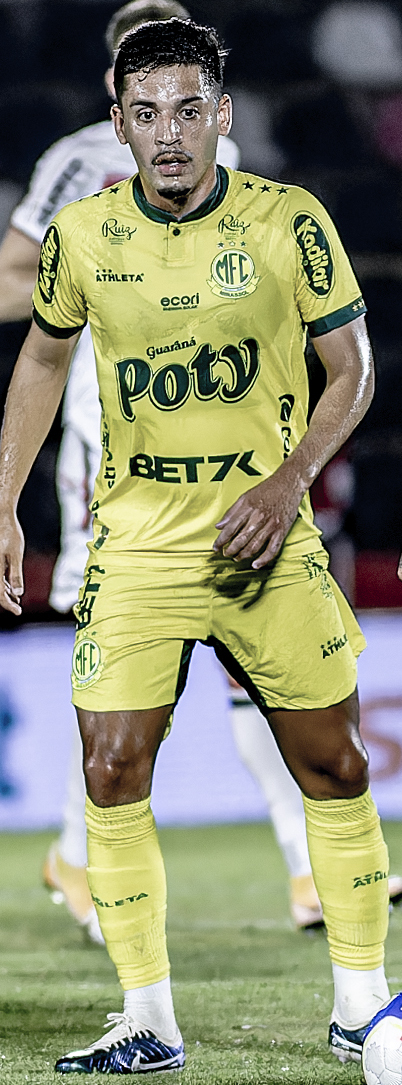
- Neto Moura with Mirassol in 2024

Personal information
- Full name: Antônio Francisco Moura Neto
- Date of birth: 6 August 1996 (age 30)
- Place of birth: Atalaia, Brazil
- Height: 1.76 m (5 ft 9 in)
- Position: Midfielder

Team information
- Current team: Mirassol
- Number: 25

Youth career
- Sport Recife

Senior career*
Years	Team	Apps	(Gls)
2014–2018	Sport Recife	73	(4)
2017	→ América Mineiro (loan)	10	(1)
2019	Vila Nova	30	(3)
2019–2022	Mirassol	63	(2)
2020	→ Ponte Preta (loan)	30	(1)
2021	→ Remo (loan)	10	(1)
2022	→ Cruzeiro (loan)	28	(0)
2023–2024	Cruzeiro	21	(0)
2023–2024	→ Mirassol (loan)	48	(1)
2025–	Mirassol	60	(1)
- * Club domestic league appearances and goals as of 9 April 2026

Antônio Francisco Moura Neto (born 6 August 1996), known as Neto Moura or simply Neto, is a Brazilian footballer who plays as a midfielder for Mirassol.

== Career statistics ==
As of 1 January 2017

Club	Season	League			State League		Cup		Continental		Other		Total	
Club	Season	Division	Apps	Goals	Apps	Goals	Apps	Goals	Apps	Goals	Apps	Goals	Apps	Goals
Sport	2014	Série A	1	0	0	0	1	0	—		—		2	0
Sport	2015	Série A	22	1	7	0	3	1	1	0	1	0	34	2
Sport	2016	Série A	12	0	3	0	2	0	—		4	1	21	1
Total			35	1	10	0	6	1	1	0	5	1	57	3

== Honours ==
Sport Recife

- Copa do Nordeste: 2014
- Campeonato Pernambucano: 2014, 2017

América Mineiro

- Campeonato Brasileiro Série B: 2017

Remo

- Copa Verde: 2021
