= Willian Machado =

Brazilian footballer (born 1996)

Personal information
- Full name: Willian Estefani Machado
- Date of birth: 13 November 1996 (age 30)
- Place of birth: Meleiro, Brazil
- Height: 1.86 m (6 ft 1 in)
- Position: Centre-back

Team information
- Current team: Mirassol
- Number: 3

Youth career
- 2012–2016: Criciúma

Senior career*
| Years | Team | Apps | (Gls) |
| 2017 | Fluminense do Itaum | 13 | (5) |
| 2018 | Brasil de Pelotas | 6 | (0) |
| 2019 | Maringá | 7 | (0) |
| 2020 | Ferroviário | 29 | (1) |
| 2021 | Botafogo-PB | 31 | (3) |
| 2022–2024 | Operário Ferroviário | 97 | (4) |
| 2025 | Ceará | 42 | (0) |
| 2026– | Mirassol | 13 | (0) |
- * Club domestic league appearances and goals as of 9 April 2026

Willian Estefani Machado (born 13 November 1996), known as Willian Machado, is a Brazilian professional footballer who plays as a centre-back for Mirassol.

== Career ==
=== Early career ===
Born in Meleiro, Santa Catarina, Willian Machado was a Criciúma youth graduate, but failed to make a first team breakthrough. After making his senior debut with Fluminense do Itaum in the 2017 Campeonato Catarinense Série B, he moved to Série B side Brasil de Pelotas for the 2018 season.

After featuring rarely at Xavante, Willian Machado was presented at Maringá on 12 December 2018. Again rarely used, he signed for Ferroviário roughly one year later.

After establishing himself as a starter for Ferrão, Willian Machado joined Botafogo-PB in February 2021. An immediate first-choice, he left the club in December after not agreeing to a new deal.

=== Operário Ferroviário ===
On 13 December 2021, Willian Machado signed a one-year deal with Operário Ferroviário. On 3 May of the following year, he renewed his contract with the club until the end of 2023.

A backup option in his first year as the club suffered relegation, Willian Machado subsequently became a starter as Fantasma returned to the second division at first attempt.

=== Ceará ===
On 6 December 2024, Willian Machado agreed to a one-year deal with Série A side Ceará. An immediate first-choice, he made his top tier debut on 31 March 2025, starting in a 2–2 away draw against Red Bull Bragantino.

== Career statistics ==
As of 30 December 2025

| Club | Season | League | | | State League | | Cup | | Continental | | Other | | Total | |
| Club | Season | Division | Apps | Goals | Apps | Goals | Apps | Goals | Apps | Goals | Apps | Goals | Apps | Goals |
|---|---|---|---|---|---|---|---|---|---|---|---|---|---|---|
| Fluminense do Itaum | 2017 | Catarinense Série B | — | | 13 | 5 | — | | — | | — | | 13 | 5 |
| Brasil de Pelotas | 2018 | Série B | 6 | 0 | 0 | 0 | — | | — | | — | | 6 | 0 |
| Maringá | 2019 | Série D | 1 | 0 | 6 | 0 | — | | — | | — | | 7 | 0 |
| Ferroviário | 2020 | Série C | 15 | 0 | 14 | 1 | — | | — | | — | | 29 | 1 |
| Botafogo-PB | 2021 | Série C | 23 | 1 | 8 | 2 | — | | — | | 9 (Note: Appearance(s) in Copa do Nordeste) | 2 | 40 | 5 |
| Operário Ferroviário | 2022 | Série B | 10 | 1 | 7 | 0 | 1 | 0 | — | | — | | 18 | 1 |
| Operário Ferroviário | 2023 | Série C | 23 | 0 | 12 | 1 | 1 | 0 | — | | — | | 36 | 1 |
| Operário Ferroviário | 2024 | Série B | 35 | 2 | 10 | 0 | 4 | 0 | — | | — | | 49 | 2 |
| Operário Ferroviário | Subtotal | | 68 | 3 | 29 | 1 | 6 | 0 | — | | — | | 103 | 4 |
| Ceará | 2025 | Série A | 36 | 0 | 6 | 0 | 3 | 0 | — | | 6 | 0 | 51 | 0 |
| Career total | | | 149 | 4 | 76 | 9 | 9 | 0 | 0 | 0 | 15 | 2 | 249 | 15 |

== Honours ==
Ceará

- Campeonato Cearense: 2025
