= 2024 Ituano FC season =

Ituano FC
2024 season
- Manager: Alberto Valentim (from 29 February)
- Stadium: Estádio Novelli Júnior
- Série B: 19th
- Top goalscorer: Vinícius Paiva (4)

The 2024 Ituano FC season is the club's 115th season in existence and the fourth consecutive season in the second division of Brazilian football. In addition to the domestic league, Guarani are participating in this season's editions of the Campeonato Paulista and the Copa do Brasil.

== Pre-season and friendlies ==
Win Draw Loss

== Competitions ==
=== Overall record ===
Competition	First match	Last match	Starting round	Final position	Record							
Competition	First match	Last match	Starting round	Final position	Pld	W	D	L	GF	GA	GD	Win %
Série B	20 April 2024	December 2024	Matchday 1		18	3	4	11	19	35	−16	16.67
Campeonato Paulista			Group Stage	Group Stage	12	1	3	8	5	19	−14	8.33
Copa do Brasil			First Round	First Round	1	0	0	1	1	2	−1	0.00
Total					31	4	7	20	25	56	−31	12.90

Source: Soccerway

=== Campeonato Brasileiro Série B ===
==== League table ====
Pos	Team	Pld	W	D	L	GF	GA	GD	Pts	Promotion or relegation
16	CRB	38	11	10	17	38	45	−7	43	
17	Ponte Preta (R)	38	10	8	20	37	55	−18	38	Relegation to 2025 Campeonato Brasileiro Série C
18	Ituano (R)	38	11	4	23	43	63	−20	37	Relegation to 2025 Campeonato Brasileiro Série C
19	Brusque (R)	38	8	12	18	24	44	−20	36	Relegation to 2025 Campeonato Brasileiro Série C
20	Guarani (R)	38	8	9	21	33	53	−20	33	Relegation to 2025 Campeonato Brasileiro Série C

Source: CBF
Rules for classification: 1) points; 2) wins; 3) goal difference; 4) goals scored; 5) head-to-head results (only between 2 teams); 6) fewest red cards; 7) fewest yellow cards; 8) drawing of lots.
(R) Relegated

==== Results summary ====
Overall								Home						Away					
Pld	W	D	L	GF	GA	GD	Pts	W	D	L	GF	GA	GD	W	D	L	GF	GA	GD
0	0	0	0	0	0	0	0	0	0	0	0	0	0	0	0	0	0	0	0

==== Results by round ====
Round	1
Ground	
Result	
Position	

A = Away; H = Home; W = Win; D = Draw; L = Loss

==== Matches ====
20 April 2024	Chapecoense	3–1	Ituano

27 April 2024	Ituano	0–2	Operário Ferroviário

5 May 2024	Ituano	1–3	Novorizontino

11 May 2024	Goiás	2–0	Ituano

16 May 2024	Ituano	1–0	Sport

19 May 2024	Mirassol	2–0	Ituano

26 May 2024	Ituano	2–0	Ponte Preta

2 June 2024	Ituano	0–1	Avaí

8 June 2024	Coritiba	4–2	Ituano

13 June 2024	Ituano	3–5	Paysandu

19 June 2024	Guarani	3–3	Ituano

23 June 2024	Ituano	1–1	Brusque

30 June 2024	Ceará	v	Ituano

=== Copa do Brasil ===
22 February 2024 First round	v	Ituano
