= Igor Formiga =

Brazilian footballer (born 1999)

Personal information
- Full name: Igor Marques Paciência Cardoso
- Date of birth: 8 January 1999 (age 27)
- Place of birth: Rio de Janeiro, Brazil
- Height: 1.77 m (5 ft 10 in)
- Position: Right-back

Team information
- Current team: Mirassol
- Number: 32

Youth career
- 2017–2018: Nova Iguaçu
- 2018: → Corinthians (loan)
- 2019: Corinthians

Senior career*
Years	Team	Apps	(Gls)
2018	Nova Iguaçu	1	(0)
2020–2022	Corinthians	0	(0)
2020	→ Coimbra (loan)	1	(0)
2022	→ Ponte Preta (loan)	3	(0)
2022	Ponte Preta	31	(0)
2023	Cruzeiro	9	(0)
2023–2024	Portimonense	27	(1)
2024–2025	Novorizontino	36	(0)
2025–2026	Juventude	20	(2)
2026–	Mirassol	11	(4)
- * Club domestic league appearances and goals as of 9 April 2026

Igor Marques Paciência Cardoso (born 8 January 1999), known as Igor Formiga, is a Brazilian professional footballer who plays as a right-back for Mirassol.

== Career ==
Igor Formiga was born in Rio de Janeiro, and represented Nova Iguaçu as a youth. He made his first team debut for the side on 22 April 2018, coming on as a half-time substitute in a 1–0 Série D away loss against Mirassol.

Igor Formiga moved to Corinthians in July 2018, being initially assigned to the under-20 team. On 4 January 2020, he was loaned to Coimbra for the year's Campeonato Mineiro.

After just one match for Coimbra, Igor Formiga returned to Timão and played mainly for their under-23 team. On 24 January 2022, he was presented at Ponte Preta on loan until the end of the year.

On 13 April 2022, despite playing just three matches in the 2022 Campeonato Paulista, Igor Formiga signed a permanent contract with Ponte until December 2023. He was a regular starter in the 2022 Série B, as the club avoided relegation.

On 13 December 2022, Igor Formiga agreed to a deal with Cruzeiro, newly promoted to the Série A. He made his top tier debut the following 14 May, replacing William in a 4–0 away routing of América Mineiro.

On 21 July 2023, Primeira Liga side Portimonense announced the signing of Formiga on a three-year contract.

On 13 August 2025, he was acquired by Juventude from Novorizontino.

== Career statistics ==
As of 28 May 2023

Appearances and goals by club, season and competition
Club	Season	League			State League		Cup		Continental		Other		Total	
Club	Season	Division	Apps	Goals	Apps	Goals	Apps	Goals	Apps	Goals	Apps	Goals	Apps	Goals
Nova Iguaçu	2018	Série D	1	0	—		—		—		—		1	0
Coimbra	2020	Mineiro	—		1	0	—		—		—		1	0
Corinthians	2020	Série A	0	0	—		—		—		—		0	0
Corinthians	2021	Série A	0	0	—		0	0	—		—		0	0
Corinthians	Total		0	0	0	0	0	0	0	0	0	0	0	0
Ponte Preta	2022	Série B	31	0	3	0	—		—		—		34	0
Cruzeiro	2023	Série A	3	0	5	0	1	0	—		—		9	0
Career total			35	0	9	0	1	0	0	0	0	0	45	0
