= João Victor (footballer, born 1997) =

Brazilian footballer

Personal information
- Full name: João Victor Carroll Santana
- Date of birth: 2 September 1997 (age 29)
- Place of birth: Recife, Brazil
- Height: 1.88 m (6 ft 2 in)
- Position: Centre back

Team information
- Current team: Mirassol
- Number: 34

Youth career
- 2008–2017: Santa Cruz

Senior career*
Years	Team	Apps	(Gls)
2016–2019	Santa Cruz	25	(1)
2018	→ Rio Verde (loan)	1	(0)
2019	→ Vitória (loan)	1	(0)
2020–2025	Vitória	66	(3)
2022	→ Guarani (loan)	35	(3)
2024–2025	→ Mirassol (loan)	60	(2)
2025–	Mirassol	36	(2)
- * Club domestic league appearances and goals as of 9 April 2026

João Victor Carroll Santana (born 2 September 1997), known as João Victor, is a Brazilian footballer who plays as a central defender for Mirassol.

== Club career ==
Born in Recife, Pernambuco, João Victor joined Santa Cruz's youth setup at the age of ten. He made his first team – and Série A – debut on 11 December 2016, coming on as a half-time substitute for Marcílio in a 0–5 away loss against São Paulo, as his side was already relegated.

After spending the 2018 campaign on loan at Rio Verde and subsequently playing for Santa Cruz's under-23s, João Victor renewed his contract until 2023 on 26 February 2019, after starting to feature more regularly. On 5 September, he moved to Série B side Vitória on loan.

On 20 December 2019, João Victor was bought outright by Vitória, after the club acquired 50% of his economic rights. After five players from his position left for the ensuing campaign, he became a regular starter.

== Career statistics ==
As of 11 February 2025.

Club	Season	League			State League		Cup		Continental		Other		Total	
Club	Season	Division	Apps	Goals	Apps	Goals	Apps	Goals	Apps	Goals	Apps	Goals	Apps	Goals
Santa Cruz	2016	Série A	1	0	—		—		—		—		1	0
Santa Cruz	2017	Série B	0	0	0	0	0	0	—		—		0	0
Santa Cruz	2018	Série C	0	0	0	0	0	0	—		—		0	0
Santa Cruz	2019	Série C	18	1	6	0	4	0	—		4 (Note: Appearance(s) in Copa do Nordeste)	0	32	1
Santa Cruz	Total		19	1	6	0	4	0	—		4	0	33	1
Rio Verde (loan)	2018	Goiano	—		1	0	—		—		—		1	0
Vitória	2019	Série B	1	0	—		—		—		—		1	0
Vitória	2020	Série B	30	3	0	0	3	0	—		8	0	41	3
Vitória	2021	Série B	8	0	8	0	2	0	—		6	0	24	0
Vitória	2023	Série B	16	0	2	0	0	0	—		5	0	23	0
Vitória	2024	Série A	0	0	2	0	0	0	—		2	0	4	0
Vitória	Total		55	3	12	0	5	0	—		21	0	93	3
Guarani (loan)	2022	Série B	31	2	4	1	1	0	—		—		36	3
Mirassol (loan)	2024	Série B	36	1	—		—		—		—		36	1
Mirassol (loan)	2025	Série A	0	0	6	1	—		—		—		6	1
Mirassol (loan)	Total		36	1	6	1	—		—		—		42	2
Career total			141	7	29	2	9	0	0	0	25	0	204	9
