= Renato Marques (Brazilian footballer) =

Brazilian footballer (born 2003)

Personal information
- Full name: Renato Marques de Oliveira Junior
- Date of birth: 9 December 2003 (age 22)
- Place of birth: Belo Horizonte, Brazil
- Height: 1.80 m (5 ft 11 in)
- Position: Forward

Team information
- Current team: Coritiba (on loan from Mirassol)
- Number: 78

Youth career
- Dínamo de Araxá
- 2019–2023: América Mineiro

Senior career*
Years	Team	Apps	(Gls)
2022–2025	América Mineiro	61	(11)
2025	→ Mirassol (loan)	7	(1)
2025–	Mirassol	7	(1)
2026–	→ Coritiba (loan)	0	(0)
- * Club domestic league appearances and goals as of 7 April 2026

Renato Marques de Oliveira Junior (born 9 December 2003), known as Renato Marques, is a Brazilian professional footballer who plays as a forward for Coritiba, on loan from Mirassol.

== Career ==
Born in Belo Horizonte, Minas Gerais, Renato Marques joined América Mineiro's youth setup from Dínamo de Araxá. He made his first team debut on 23 March 2022, coming on as a late substitute for fellow youth graduate Adyson in a 3–1 Campeonato Mineiro away loss against Tombense.

Renato Marques returned to the under-20 squad after a further first team appearance, and helped the team to reach the 2023 Copa São Paulo de Futebol Júnior finals with six goals. On 3 March 2023, he renewed his contract until the end of 2025.

Renato Marques made his Série A debut on 10 May 2023, replacing Everaldo in a 2–2 away draw against Red Bull Bragantino. He scored his first senior goal on 3 June, netting his team's second in a 2–0 home win over Corinthians.

== Career statistics ==
As of 27 May 2024

Club	Season	League			State League		Cup		Continental		Other		Total	
Club	Season	Division	Apps	Goals	Apps	Goals	Apps	Goals	Apps	Goals	Apps	Goals	Apps	Goals
América Mineiro	2022	Série A	0	0	2	0	0	0	—		—		2	0
América Mineiro	2023	Série A	12	3	0	0	1	0	1 (Note: Appearance(s) in Copa Sudamericana)	0	—		14	3
América Mineiro	2024	Série B	7	3	9	4	1	0	—		—		17	7
Career total			19	6	11	4	2	0	1	0	0	0	33	10
