= Gabriel (footballer, born 2003) =

Brazilian footballer (born 2003)

Personal information
- Full name: Gabriel Knesowitsch
- Date of birth: 18 October 2003 (age 23)
- Place of birth: Guarapuava, Brazil
- Height: 1.85 m (6 ft 1 in)
- Position: Centre back

Team information
- Current team: Mirassol (on loan from Cuiabá)

Youth career
- FC Cascavel
- Londrina

Senior career*
Years	Team	Apps	(Gls)
2022–2023	Londrina	46	(4)
2024–	Cuiabá	24	(1)
2025	→ Mirassol (loan)	4	(0)
2026–	→ Mirassol (loan)	0	(0)
- * Club domestic league appearances and goals as of 16 April 2026

Gabriel Knesowitsch (born 18 October 2003), simply known as Gabriel, is a Brazilian professional footballer who plays as a central defender for Mirassol, on loan from Cuiabá.

== Career ==
Born in Guarapuava, Paraná, Gabriel joined Londrina's youth setup from FC Cascavel. He made his first team debut on 26 February 2022, coming on as a first-half substitute for injured Léo Assunpção in a 2–1 Campeonato Paranaense away loss to Rio Branco-PR.

Gabriel made his Série B debut on 28 October 2022, starting in a 2–0 home loss to Ituano. Definitely promoted to the main squad for the 2023 season, he established himself as a regular starter, and scored his first professional goal on 20 May of that year, netting the opener in a 2–0 away win over Tombense.

On 9 October 2023, Gabriel renewed his contract with LEC until 2027.

== Personal life ==
Gabriel is of Polish, Austrian and German descent, and holds a Polish passport.

== Career statistics ==
As of 7 June 2024.

Appearances and goals by club, season and competition
Club	Season	League			State League		Cup		Continental		Other		Total	
Club	Season	Division	Apps	Goals	Apps	Goals	Apps	Goals	Apps	Goals	Apps	Goals	Apps	Goals
Londrina	2022	Série B	2	0	1	0	0	0	—		—		3	0
Londrina	2023	Série B	32	4	11	0	1	0	—		—		44	4
Londrina	Total		34	4	12	0	1	0	—		—		47	4
Cuiabá	2024	Série A	2	0	2	0	1	0	1	0	—		6	0
Career total			36	4	14	0	2	0	1	0	0	0	53	4
