= Edson Carioca =

Brazilian footballer (born 1997)

Personal information
- Full name: Edson Guilherme Mendes dos Santos
- Date of birth: 4 June 1997 (age 29)
- Place of birth: Rio de Janeiro, Brazil
- Height: 1.78 m (5 ft 10 in)
- Position: Attacking midfielder

Team information
- Current team: Mirassol (on loan from Goiás)
- Number: 95

Youth career
- 2017: Tigres do Brasil
- 2017–2018: Internacional

Senior career*
Years	Team	Apps	(Gls)
2019	Tombense	18	(2)
2019	Rio Claro	0	(0)
2020	Portuguesa	8	(0)
2020	Treze	13	(0)
2021–2024	Azuriz	23	(4)
2021–2022	→ Coritiba (loan)	3	(0)
2022	→ Guarani (loan)	12	(2)
2023	→ Botafogo-SP (loan)	41	(3)
2024	→ Juventude (loan)	28	(3)
2025–	Goiás	9	(0)
2025–	→ Mirassol (loan)	25	(4)
- * Club domestic league appearances and goals as of 9 April 2026

Edson Guilherme Mendes dos Santos (born 4 June 1997), known as Edson Carioca or Edson is a Brazilian footballer who plays for Mirassol, on loan from Goiás. Mainly an attacking midfielder, he can also play as a left winger.

== Career ==
=== Tombense ===
Edson Carioca made his league debut against Tupi on 20 January 2019. He scored his first goal against URT on 27 January 2019, scoring in the 45th+1st minute.

=== Rio Claro ===
Edson Carioca made his debut in the Copa Paulista on 7 September 2019 against São Caetano.

=== Portuguesa ===
Edson Carioca made his league debut against XV de Piracicaba on 22 January 2020.

=== Treze ===
Edson Carioca made his league debut against Santa Cruz on 19 August 2020.

=== Azuriz ===
Edson Carioca scored on his league debut against Operário Ferroviário EC on 28 February 2021, scoring in the 90th+6th minute.

=== Coritiba ===
Edson Carioca joined Coritiba. He made his league debut against Brusque on 3 August 2021.

=== Guarani ===
Edson Carioca made his league debut against Ponte Preta on 20 August 2022. He scored his first goal for the club against Tombense on 27 August 2022, scoring in the 55th minute.

=== Botafogo-SP ===
Edson Carioca made his league debut against Portuguesa on 14 January 2023. He scored his first goal against São Bento on 14 February 2023, scoring in the 76th minute.

=== Juventude ===
Edson Carioca made his league debut against FC Santa Cruz on 20 January 2024.

== Career statistics ==
As of 22 February 2024

Club	Season	League			State League		Cup		Continental		Other		Total	
Club	Season	Division	Apps	Goals	Apps	Goals	Apps	Goals	Apps	Goals	Apps	Goals	Apps	Goals
Tombense	2019	Série C	9	1	9	1	1	1	—		—		19	3
Rio Claro	2019	Paulista A2	—		—		—		—		3 (Note: Appearance(s) in Copa Paulista)	0	3	0
Portuguesa	2020	Paulista A2	—		8	0	—		—		—		8	0
Treze	2020	Série C	8	0	5	0	—		—		0	0	13	0
Azuriz	2021	Paranaense	—		11	1	—		—		—		11	1
Azuriz	2022	Série D	12	3	—		2	0	—		—		14	3
Azuriz	Total		12	3	11	1	2	0	—		—		25	4
Coritiba (loan)	2021	Série B	1	0	—		—		—		—		1	0
Coritiba (loan)	2022	Série A	0	0	2	0	0	0	—		—		2	0
Coritiba (loan)	Total		1	0	2	0	0	0	—		—		3	0
Guarani (loan)	2022	Série B	12	2	—		—		—		—		12	2
Botafogo-SP (loan)	2023	Série B	29	1	12	2	3	0	—		—		44	3
Juventude (loan)	2024	Série A	0	0	5	0	0	0	—		—		5	0
Career total			71	6	52	4	6	1	0	0	3	0	132	12

== Honours ==
Treze

- Campeonato Paraibano: 2020
