= Reinaldo (footballer, born 1989) =

Brazilian footballer

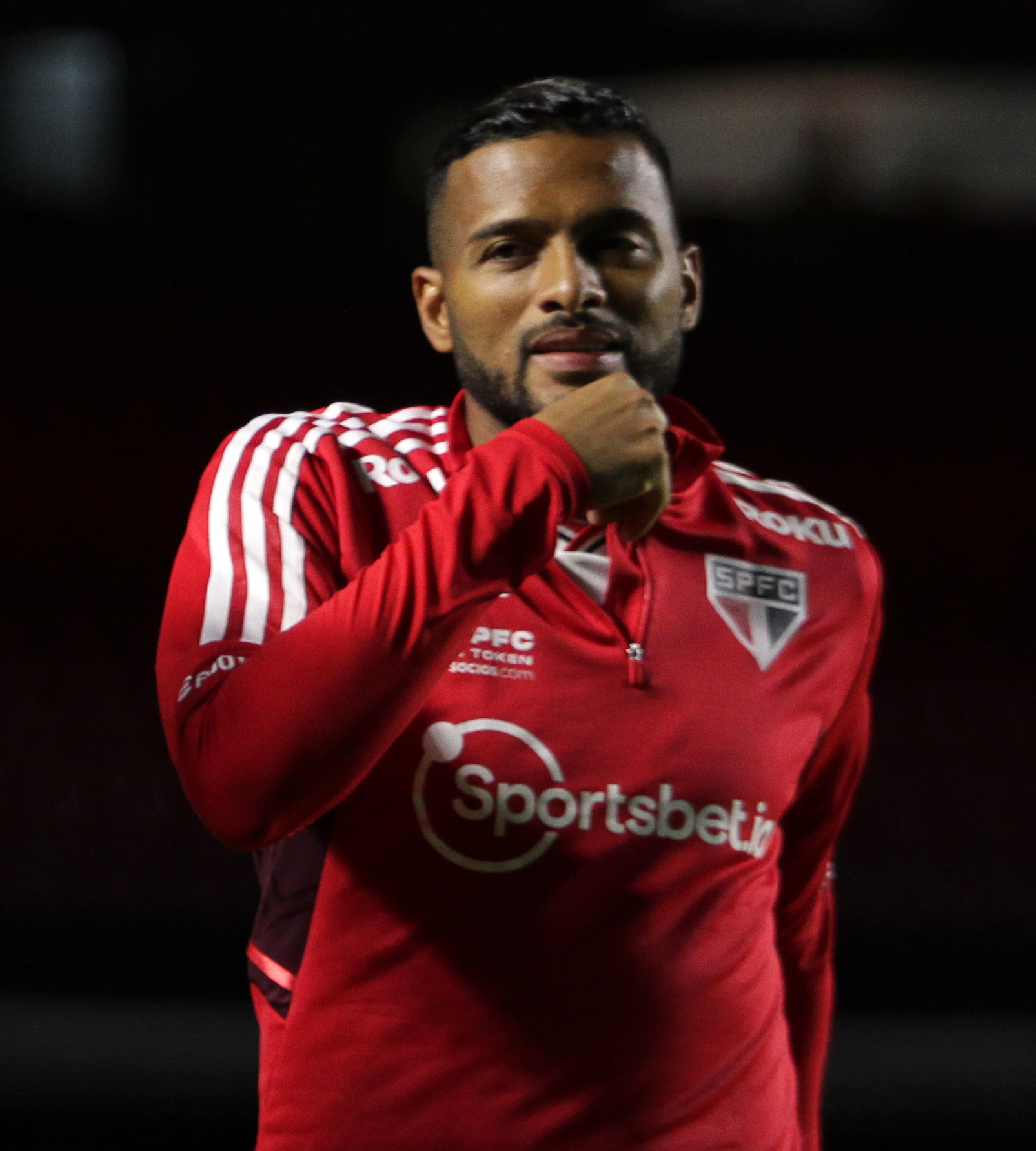

Personal information
- Full name: Reinaldo Manoel da Silva
- Date of birth: 28 September 1989 (age 37)
- Place of birth: Porto Calvo, Brazil
- Height: 1.78 m (5 ft 10 in)
- Position: Left-back

Team information
- Current team: Mirassol
- Number: 6

Youth career
- 2009: Atlético Sorocaba

Senior career*
Years	Team	Apps	(Gls)
2010–2013	Penapolense	42	(8)
2011–2012	→ Paulista (loan)	17	(3)
2012–2013	→ Sport Recife (loan)	40	(3)
2013	→ São Paulo (loan)	26	(2)
2014–2022	São Paulo	271	(24)
2016	→ Ponte Preta (loan)	44	(4)
2017	→ Chapecoense (loan)	52	(6)
2023–2024	Grêmio	79	(7)
2025–	Mirassol	58	(14)
- * Club domestic league appearances and goals as of 9 April 2026

Reinaldo Manoel da Silva (born 28 September 1989), simply known as Reinaldo, is a Brazilian professional footballer who plays as a left-back for Mirassol.

== Club career ==
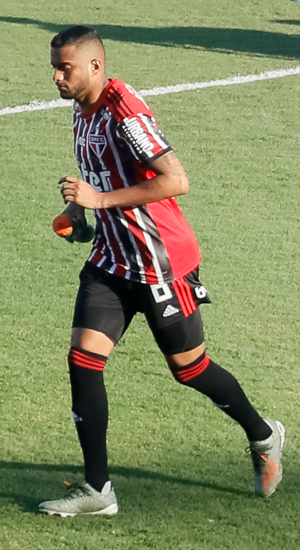
Reinaldo with São Paulo in 2019

Born in Porto Calvo, Alagoas, Reinaldo began his career with Penapolense before moving on loan to Paulista. On 16 May 2012, he joined Série A side Sport Recife on loan until the end of the season.

Reinaldo made his top flight debut on 27 May 2012, coming on as a late substitute in a 0–0 draw at Santos FC. He finished the season with 24 appearances (18 starts, 1696 minutes of action), but experiencing relegation nonetheless.

On 29 May 2013, Reinaldo joined São Paulo FC also on loan. On 30 November, after featuring regularly for the side, Tricolor bought him outright.

On 8 February 2016, Reinaldo was loaned to Ponte Preta until the end of the year. On 28 December, he renewed his contract until 2018 and moved to Chapecoense also in a temporary deal.

Back to São Paulo after scoring a career-best nine goals at Chape, Reinaldo became a first-choice for the club and winning the 2021 Campeonato Paulista. On 7 December 2022, he was announced at Grêmio on a two-year contract.

On 6 January 2025, Reinaldo was announced at top tier newcomers Mirassol.

== Career statistics ==
As of 13 November 2025

Club	Season	League			State League		National Cup		Continental		Other		Total	
Club	Season	Division	Apps	Goals	Apps	Goals	Apps	Goals	Apps	Goals	Apps	Goals	Apps	Goals
Penapolense	2010	Paulista A3	—		19	4	—		—		19 (Note: Appearance(s) in Copa Paulista)	0	38	4
Penapolense	2011	Paulista A3	—		23	4	—		—		—		23	4
Penapolense	Total		—		42	8	—		—		19	0	61	8
Paulista (loan)	2011	Paulista	—		0	0	—		—		23	3	23	3
Paulista (loan)	2012	Paulista	—		17	3	2	0	—		—		19	3
Paulista (loan)	Total		—		17	3	2	0	—		23	3	42	6
Sport Recife (loan)	2012	Série B	24	0	—		—		—		—		24	0
Sport Recife (loan)	2013	Série A	2	0	14	3	3	0	—		8 (Note: Appearance(s) in Copa do Nordeste)	1	27	4
Sport Recife (loan)	Total		26	0	14	3	3	0	—		8	1	51	4
São Paulo	2013	Série A	26	2	—		—		5 (Note: Appearance(s) in Copa Sudamericana)	0	1 (Note: Appearance(s) in Suruga Bank Championship)	0	32	2
São Paulo	2014	Série A	17	0	6	0	0	0	1	0	—		24	0
São Paulo	2015	Série A	23	0	9	0	5	0	7 (Note: Appearance(s) in Copa Libertadores)	1	—		44	1
São Paulo	2018	Série A	31	2	10	1	3	0	4	0	—		48	3
São Paulo	2019	Série A	35	5	15	1	1	0	2	0	—		53	6
São Paulo	2020	Série A	35	6	10	1	5	0	7 (Note: Five appearances and one goal in Copa Libertadores, two appearances in Copa Sudamericana)	1	—		57	8
São Paulo	2021	Série A	30	2	12	1	5	0	5	1	—		52	4
São Paulo	2022	Série A	28	3	10	2	8	1	10	2	—		56	8
São Paulo	Total		225	20	72	6	27	1	41	5	1	0	366	32
Ponte Preta (loan)	2016	Série A	32	2	12	2	7	0	—		—		51	4
Chapecoense (loan)	2017	Série A	34	5	18	1	1	0	9 (Note: Six appearances and two goals in Copa Libertadores, three appearances in Copa Sudamericana)	2	4 (Note: Two appearances and one goal in Recopa Sudamericana, one appearance in Primeira Liga, one appearance in Suruga Bank Championship)	1	66	9
Grêmio	2023	Série A	30	2	10	1	8	0	—		1 (Note: Appearance(s) in Recopa Gaúcha)	0	48	3
Grêmio	2024	Série A	29	3	10	1	2	0	5	2	—		46	6
Grêmio	Total		59	5	20	2	10	0	5	2	1	0	94	9
Mirassol	2025	Série A	32	12	0	0	—		—		—		32	12
Career total			408	44	195	25	50	1	55	9	56	5	763	84

== Honours ==
Penapolense

- Campeonato Paulista Série A3: 2011
- Copa Paulista: 2011

São Paulo

- Campeonato Paulista: 2021

Chapecoense

- Campeonato Catarinense: 2017

Grêmio

- Campeonato Gaúcho: 2023, 2024
- Recopa Gaúcha: 2023

=== Individual ===
- Campeonato Catarinense Team of the Year: 2017
- Troféu Mesa Redonda Team of the Year: 2018, 2019, 2025
- Campeonato Paulista Team of the Year: 2021
- Bola de Prata: 2025
- Campeonato Brasileiro Série A Team of the Year: 2025
