= Alesson =

Brazilian footballer (born 1999)

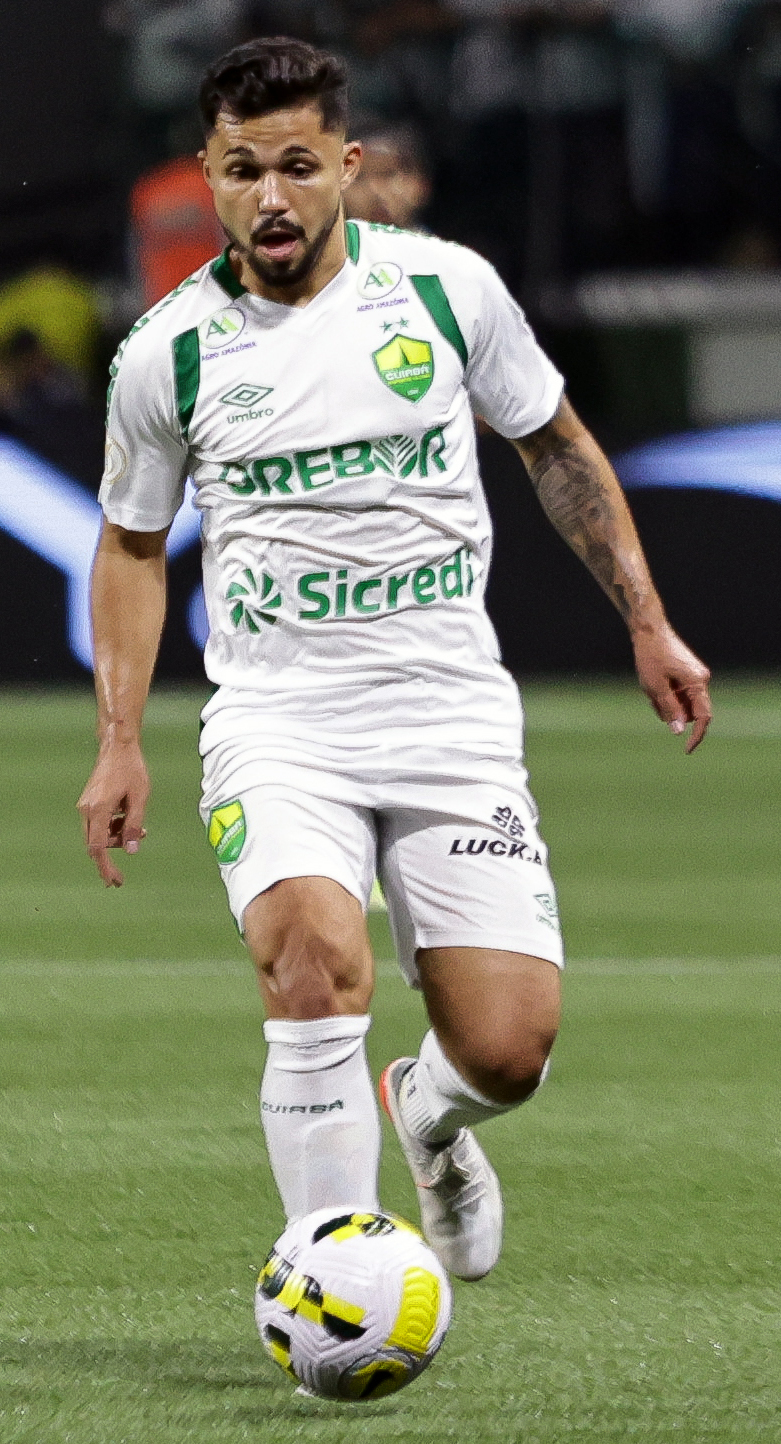
- Alesson with Cuiabá in 2022

Personal information
- Full name: Alesson dos Santos Batista
- Date of birth: 16 February 1999 (age 27)
- Place of birth: Guarulhos, Brazil
- Height: 1.73 m (5 ft 8 in)
- Positions: Attacking midfielder; forward

Team information
- Current team: Mirassol
- Number: 77

Youth career
- –2014: PSTC
- 2015–2018: Paraná
- 2017: → Ponte Preta (loan)
- 2017–2018: → Cruzeiro (loan)

Senior career*
Years	Team	Apps	(Gls)
2016–2019	Paraná	28	(0)
2020–2021	Bahia	17	(2)
2021–2024	Vila Nova	68	(18)
2022	→ Cuiabá (loan)	21	(2)
2023	→ Goiás (loan)	23	(2)
2025–2026	Torpedo Moscow	7	(0)
2025–2026	→ Mirassol (loan)	48	(7)
2026–	Mirassol	0	(0)
- * Club domestic league appearances and goals as of 30 May 2026

Alesson dos Santos Batista (born 16 February 1999), simply known as Alesson, is a Brazilian footballer who plays as either an attacking midfielder or a forward for Mirassol.

== Club career ==
Born in Guarulhos, São Paulo, Alesson started his career with PSTC in 2013, at the age of 14. He moved to Paraná in 2015, and made his first team debut for the latter club on 19 November 2016 by starting in a 1–1 Série B away draw against Ceará.

Alesson started the 2017 season on loan at Ponte Preta's under-20, before moving to Cruzeiro in September, also in a temporary deal. He returned to Paraná in September 2018, after Cruzeiro did not exercise his buyout clause; upon returning, he was assigned to the first team now in the Série A.

Alesson made his top tier debut on 27 October 2018, replacing Jhonny Lucas in a 1–3 away loss against former side Cruzeiro. He scored his first senior goal the following 7 February, netting the opener in a 5–2 away win against Itabaiana, for the year's Copa do Brasil.

On 6 January 2020, Alesson moved to Bahia on a two-year contract, after reaching an agreement to terminate his contract with Paraná.

== Career statistics ==
As of 3 April 2021

Club	Season	League			State League		Cup		Continental		Other		Total	
Club	Season	Division	Apps	Goals	Apps	Goals	Apps	Goals	Apps	Goals	Apps	Goals	Apps	Goals
Paraná	2016	Série B	2	0	0	0	0	0	—		—		2	0
Paraná	2017	Série B	0	0	4	0	—		—		0	0	4	0
Paraná	2018	Série A	7	0	—		—		—		—		7	0
Paraná	2019	Série B	19	0	11	1	2	1	—		—		32	2
Paraná	Total		28	0	15	1	2	1	—		0	0	45	2
Bahia	2020	Série A	16	2	11	1	0	0	1 (Note: Appearance (s) in Copa Sudamericana)	0	2 (Note: Appearance (s) in Copa do Nordeste)	0	30	3
Bahia	2021	Série A	0	0	0	0	0	0	0	0	5	0	5	0
Bahia	Total		16	2	11	1	0	0	1	0	7	0	35	3
Total			44	2	26	2	2	1	1	0	7	0	80	5

== Honours ==
Bahia

- Campeonato Baiano: 2020

Goiás

- Copa Verde: 2023
