= Georgemy =

Brazilian footballer (born 1995)

Personal information
- Full name: Georgemy Gonçalves
- Date of birth: 15 August 1995 (age 31)
- Place of birth: Americana, Brazil
- Height: 1.98 m (6 ft 6 in)
- Position: Goalkeeper

Team information
- Current team: Criciúma
- Number: 95

Youth career
- –2015: Cruzeiro

Senior career*
Years	Team	Apps	(Gls)
2015–2017	Cruzeiro	2	(0)
2015–2016	→ Estoril (loan)	5	(0)
2016–2017	→ Vitória Guimarães B (loan)	12	(0)
2018	Tupi	0	(0)
2018	Guarani	1	(0)
2019	Villa Nova	11	(0)
2019–2020	Boa Esporte	2	(0)
2020	CRB	1	(0)
2020–2022	Vila Nova	86	(0)
2023	Novorizontino	6	(0)
2024	Brusque	1	(0)
2025	CSA	8	(0)
2025–	Criciúma	1	(0)

International career
2015	Brazil U20	1	(0)
- * Club domestic league appearances and goals as of 16 December 2025

Georgemy Gonçalves (born 15 August 1995) is a Brazilian football player who plays as goalkeeper for Criciúma.

== Club career ==
=== Early career ===
Georgemy started his youth football career at Cruzeiro.

=== Cruzeiro ===
On 1 July 2015, Georgemy was called up for Cruzeiro first team.

==== Estoril (loan) ====
On 13 July 2015, he was loaned to Estoril for a season. He made his professional league debut against C.D. Tondela on 15 February 2016. In this game, he played 6 minutes of the game, after he replaced Leo Bonatini. He played 6 games for Estoril and gave up 7 goals.

==== Vitória de Guimarães (loan) ====
On 19 July 2016, he was loaned to Vitória de Guimarães.

== International career ==
He was a member of Brazil national under-20 football team for 2015 FIFA U-20 World Cup Brazil finished the competition as runners-up, but Georgemy didn't play any games in the competition.

== Club career statistics ==
Club performance			League		Cup		League Cup		continental		Total	
Season	Club	League	Apps	Goals	Apps	Goals	Apps	Goals	Apps	Goals	Apps	Goals
Portugal			League		Taça de Portugal		Taça da Liga		Europe		Total	
2015-16	Estoril (loan)	Primeira Liga	4	0	1	0	1	0	—		6	0
2016-17	Vitória de Guimarães (loan)	Primeira Liga	0	0	0	0	0	0	—		0	0
Total	Portugal		4	0	1	0	1	0	0	0	6	0
Total	Career total		4	0	1	0	1	0	0	0	6	0
