= Daniel Borges =

Brazilian footballer (born 1993)

Personal information
- Full name: Daniel Fortunato Borges
- Date of birth: 23 March 1993 (age 33)
- Place of birth: São José dos Campos, Brazil
- Height: 1.74 m (5 ft 9 in)
- Position: Right-back

Team information
- Current team: Mirassol
- Number: 20

Youth career
- Primeira Camisa
- 2011: Botafogo-SP

Senior career*
Years	Team	Apps	(Gls)
2011–2016	Botafogo-SP	84	(6)
2013	→ Vitória (loan)	3	(0)
2014	→ Ponte Preta (loan)	13	(0)
2015	→ Atlético Paranaense (loan)	3	(0)
2017	Atlético Goianiense	15	(0)
2017–2018	Oeste	56	(0)
2018–2021	Mirassol	38	(3)
2019	→ CRB (loan)	34	(0)
2020	→ América Mineiro (loan)	24	(0)
2021	→ Botafogo (loan)	37	(1)
2022–2024	Botafogo	46	(1)
2023–2024	→ América Mineiro (loan)	34	(0)
2025–	Mirassol	29	(2)
- * Club domestic league appearances and goals as of 9 April 2026

Daniel Fortunato Borges (born 23 March 1993) is a Brazilian professional footballer who plays for Mirassol. Mainly a right-back, he can also play as a midfielder.

== Career ==
Born in São José dos Campos, São Paulo, Daniel Borges graduated from Botafogo-SP's youth setup. He made his debut on 27 March 2011, coming on as a substitute for Túlio Souza in a 4–0 home loss against Linense for the Campeonato Paulista championship.

In July 2013 Daniel Borges was loaned to Série A side Vitória, until December. He made his debut in the competition on the 21st, in a 0–0 home draw against Bahia.

On 4 April 2014, after appearing in the year's Paulistão with his parent club, Daniel Borges moved to Ponte Preta on loan until the end of the year. He appeared in 13 matches for the latter, helping the club return to the top level at first attempt.

On 18 December 2014, Daniel Borges joined Atlético Paranaense, in a season-long loan deal.

== Honours ==
Botafogo-SP

- Campeonato Brasileiro Série D: 2015

Botafogo

- Campeonato Brasileiro Série B: 2021
