= Estádio José Maria de Campos Maia =

Soccer stadium in Mirassol, Brazil

José Maria de Campos Maia
- Maião
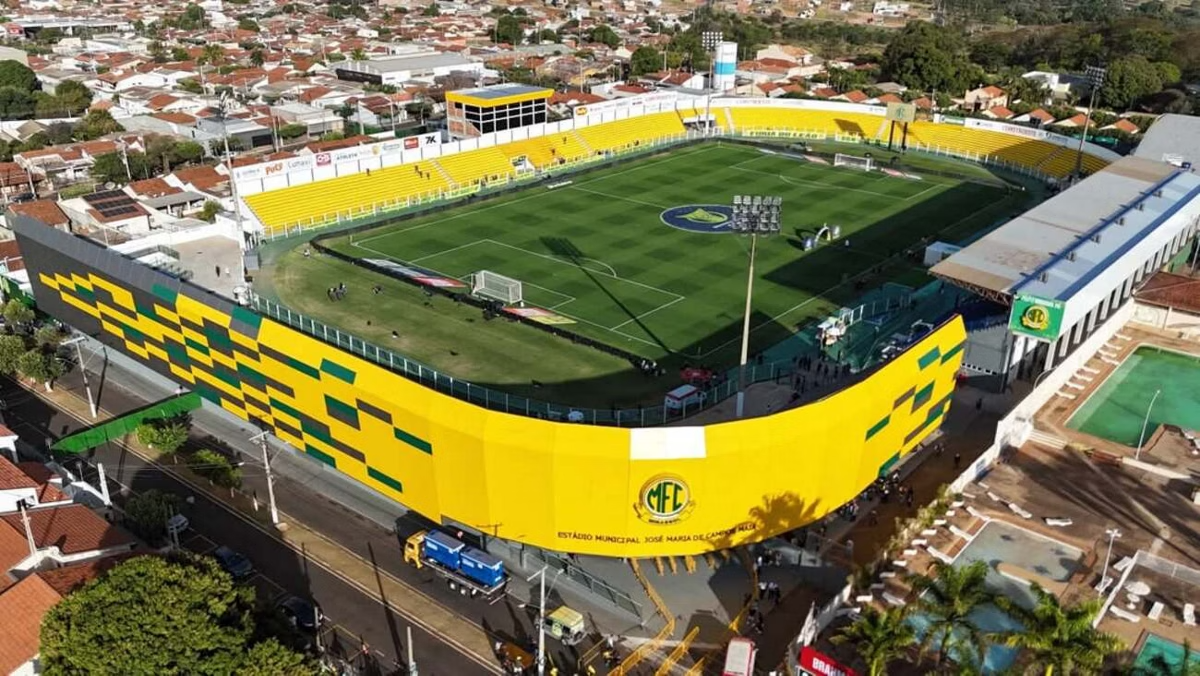
- Sisbrace
- Interactive map of José Maria de Campos Maia
- Full name: Estádio Municipal José Maria de Campos Maia
- Location: Mirassol, SP, Brazil
- Coordinates: 20.8214°S 49.5069°W
- Owner: City of Mirassol
- Operator: City of Mirassol
- Capacity: 14,534
- Surface: Natural grass
- Field size: 105 by 68 metres (114.8 yd × 74.4 yd)

Construction
- Opened: 3 March 1983
- Renovated: 1983, 2007

Tenant
- Mirassol

Estádio Municipal José Maria de Campos Maia, known as José Maria de Campos Maia or sometimes as Maião, is a multi-use stadium in Mirassol, São Paulo, Brazil. It is used mostly for football matches, and has a maximum capacity of 14,534 people.

== History ==
Inaugurated on 3 March 1983 in a match between Mirassol and Jalesense, the stadium was named after José Maria de Campos Maia, a famous businessman and mayor of the city (1951; 1956–1959), who kindly donated the ground for the construction of the stadium as a gift to the people of Mirassol.

In 2017, Mirassol spent R$ 230,000 to revamp the stadium's grass and install a new drainage and irrigation system.
