= Mirassol Futebol Clube =

Brazilian association football club based in Mirassol, São Paulo, Brazil

Mirassol
- Full name: Mirassol Futebol Clube
- Nickname: Leão da Alta Araraquarense (Araraquense Highway Lion)
- Founded: 9 November 1925; 100 years ago
- Ground: José Maria de Campos Maia
- Capacity: 14,534
- President: Edson Ermenegildo
- Head coach: Rafael Guanaes
- League: Campeonato Brasileiro Série A Campeonato Paulista
- 2025 2025: Série A, 4th of 20; Paulista, 8th of 16
- Website: www.mirassolfc.com.br
Home colors	Away colors	Third colors

Mirassol Futebol Clube (Brazilian Portuguese: [miɾaˈsɔw futʃiˈbɔw ˈklubi]) is a Brazilian professional club based in Mirassol, São Paulo founded on 9 November 1925. It competes in the Campeonato Brasileiro Série A, the top flight of Brazilian football, as well as in the Campeonato Paulista, the top flight of the São Paulo state football league.

Mirassol won the 2020 Campeonato Brasileiro Série D and the 2022 Campeonato Brasileiro Série C, and was runner-up of the 2024 Campeonato Brasileiro Série B.

== History ==
Founded on 9 November 1925 as Mirassol Esporte Clube, the club only played amateur tournaments until 1951, when they played in the year's Campeonato Paulista Segunda Divisão. Back to an amateur status in the following year, the club only returned to a competition in 1960, playing in the Campeonato Paulista Terceira Divisão (the fourth tier) and achieving immediate promotion.

After managing to avoid relegation in the 1961 Campeonato Paulista Segunda Divisão (now the third tier), Mirassol became rivals of newly-founded Grêmio Recreação Esporte Cultura Mirassol during the 1962 and 1963 seasons, when both sides were in the same division. Both clubs merged in 1964, with the new club being named Mirassol Atlético Clube. The new club also changed colors, wearing white and blue kits.

In 1981, after the associates of GREC grew distant from the project, the merger was undone, with Mirassol regaining their yellow and green colors and becoming Mirassol Futebol Clube. The club then returned to the third division of the Paulistão, achieving promotion to the second tier in 1985. In 1994, with the restructuring of the divisions, the club was assigned to the Campeonato Paulista Série A3.

In 1997, Mirassol won the Série A3, beating União Barbarense, Olímpia, and São Caetano in the final four group stage. Relegated in 2003, the club returned to the second tier in the following year.

In 2007, the club finished in second in its group in the Campeonato Paulista Série A2 semifinal stage, thus being promoted for the first time in club's history to Campeonato Paulista. After finishing eighth in the 2008 Campeonato Paulista, the club qualified to the 2008 Série C, their first-ever national competition.

After suffering relegation in the 2013 Paulistão, Mirassol spent three seasons in the Série A2 before achieving promotion in 2016. After managing to avoid relegation in the following years, the club finished third in the 2020 Campeonato Paulista, beating São Paulo in the quarterfinals. In that season, the club also won the Série D, their first-ever national title, although the finals were played in February 2021.

After narrowly avoiding relegation in the 2021 Série C, the club went on to win the 2022 edition, achieving promotion to the Série B. In 2024, the secured promotion to the Série A for the first time in their history, after defeating Chapecoense 1–0 in the final round of the Série B.

Despite being eliminated in the quarterfinals of the 2025 Campeonato Paulista by eventual champions Corinthians, Mirassol became the best-ever debutant in the Série A after reaching 52 points with nine rounds to go, beating Grêmio Barueri's record in 2009. On 2 December 2025, they achieved a 2–0 away win over Vasco da Gama in their penultimate match, earning a first-ever place in the 2026 Copa Libertadores group stage as one of the league's top four sides.

== Stadium ==
The club's home matches are usually played at Municipal José Maria de Campos Maia stadium, which has a maximum capacity of 14,534 people.

== Club colors, mascot and nickname ==
Mirassol's colors are yellow and green.

The club's mascot is a lion.

Leãozinho, meaning Little Lion, is Mirassol's nickname.

== Current squad ==
As of 22 September 2026

Note: Flags indicate national team as defined under FIFA eligibility rules; some limited exceptions apply. Players may hold more than one non-FIFA nationality.

No.	Pos.	Nation	Player
1	GK	BRA	Georgemy
2	DF	BRA	Lucas Oliveira
3	DF	BRA	Willian Machado
5	MF	BRA	Japa (on loan from Cruzeiro)
6	DF	BRA	Reinaldo (captain)
7	MF	BRA	Shaylon
8	MF	BRA	Denilson
9	FW	BRA	Zé Roberto
10	MF	BRA	Chico Kim
11	FW	BRA	Negueba
12	DF	BRA	Victor Luis
16	FW	BRA	Gustavo Silva
17	FW	BRA	Fernandinho
18	DF	BRA	Elias (on loan from Vila Nova)
20	DF	BRA	Daniel Borges
21	MF	BRA	José Aldo

No.	Pos.	Nation	Player
22	GK	BRA	Walter
23	GK	BRA	Alex Muralha
25	MF	BRA	Neto Moura
30	FW	BRA	Bruno Santos
32	DF	BRA	Igor Formiga
33	MF	BRA	Eduardo
34	DF	BRA	João Victor
44	DF	BRA	Gabriel Knesowitsch (on loan from Cuiabá)
53	DF	BRA	Marcelinho
55	MF	BRA	Gustavo Cazonatti
77	FW	BRA	Alesson
80	MF	BRA	Wallisson
90	GK	BRA	Thomazella
95	FW	BRA	Edson Carioca
96	FW	BRA	Carlos Eduardo
99	FW	BRA	André Luis

=== Youth team ===
Note: Flags indicate national team as defined under FIFA eligibility rules; some limited exceptions apply. Players may hold more than one non-FIFA nationality.

No.	Pos.	Nation	Player
35	DF	BRA	Luiz Silva

=== Other players under contract ===
Note: Flags indicate national team as defined under FIFA eligibility rules; some limited exceptions apply. Players may hold more than one non-FIFA nationality.

No.	Pos.	Nation	Player
—	DF	BRA	Wesley Santos

=== Out on loan ===
Note: Flags indicate national team as defined under FIFA eligibility rules; some limited exceptions apply. Players may hold more than one non-FIFA nationality.

No.	Pos.	Nation	Player
—	DF	BRA	Igor Cariús (at Vila Nova until 30 November 2026)
—	FW	BRA	Renato Marques (at Coritiba until 31 December 2026)

No.	Pos.	Nation	Player
—	FW	BRA	Rodrigo Rodrigues (at Cuiabá until 30 November 2026)

== Honours ==
=== Official tournaments ===
National
Competitions	Titles	Seasons
Campeonato Brasileiro Série C	1	2022
Campeonato Brasileiro Série D	1	2020
State
Competitions	Titles	Seasons
Campeonato Paulista Série A3	1	1997

=== Others tournaments ===
==== State ====
- Troféu Fernando Vendramine (1): 2003

=== Runners-up ===
- Campeonato Brasileiro Série B (1): 2024
- Campeonato Paulista Série A2 (1): 2016
- Campeonato Paulista Série A3 (2): 1985, 2004

== See also ==
- Mirassol Futebol Clube (women), women's football team
