= 2026 Campeonato Mineiro final =

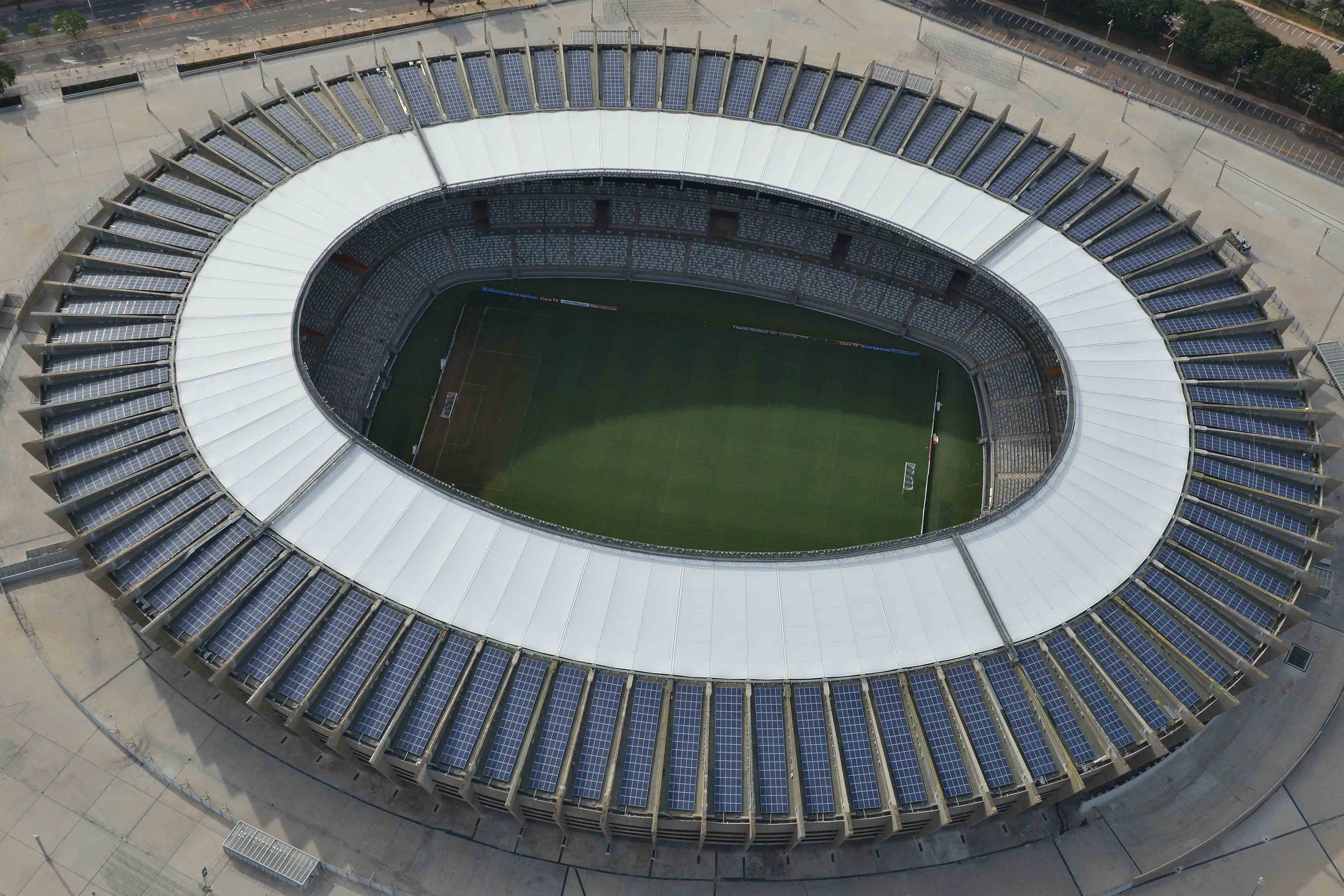
- The Mineirão hosted the final
Cruzeiro	Atlético Mineiro
1	0
- Date: 8 March 2026
- Venue: Mineirão, Belo Horizonte
- Man of the Match: Kaio Jorge (Cruzeiro)
- Referee: Matheus Delgado Candançan
- Attendance: 49,675

The 2026 Campeonato Mineiro final was a football match played on 8 March 2026 to decide the winner of the 2026 season of the Campeonato Mineiro, the top league of the Brazilian state of Minas Gerais. The match was played between Cruzeiro and Atlético Mineiro, two rival teams from the state capital Belo Horizonte and the most successful teams in the history of the league.

Cruzeiro forward Kaio Jorge scored the only goal of the game, in the 60th minute. After a confrontation between Atlético Mineiro goalkeeper Everson and Cruzeiro midfielder Christian, the game ended with a mass brawl. Twenty-three players – twelve from Cruzeiro and eleven from Atlético Mineiro – were retrospectively given red cards by referee Matheus Delgado Candançan. The players received four-match bans for the next year's Campeonato Mineiro.

Cruzeiro won their 39th title and first since 2019, ending Atlético Mineiro's run of six consecutive titles. Cruzeiro manager Tite completed a set of Campeonato Mineiro, Campeonato Paulista, Campeonato Carioca and Campeonato Gaúcho titles, a feat previously achieved by Telê Santana.

== Background ==
The Campeonato Mineiro is the top division of football in the Brazilian state of Minas Gerais, and has been staged since 1915. Atlético Mineiro and Cruzeiro, two rival teams from the state capital Belo Horizonte, are the dominant teams: before the 2026 final, Atlético Mineiro had a record 50 titles including the most recent six, while Cruzeiro had 38, most recently in 2019.

== Route to the final ==
=== Cruzeiro ===
On 16 December 2025, Cruzeiro appointed former Brazil national team manager Tite as their new head coach for the upcoming year; he had managed Atlético Mineiro in 2005. The side began the championship with a 2–1 home loss to Pouso Alegre, but made the semi-finals with a record of five wins and three losses.

In the semi-finals, Cruzeiro overcame Pouso Alegre, winning 2–1 away in the first leg on 21 February with goals by Lucas Silva and Bruno Rodrigues. A week later in the second leg at the Mineirão, Kaio Jorge scored the only goal of the game, in the seventh minute of added time.

=== Atlético Mineiro ===
Atlético Mineiro drew the first four games of the season, before defeating Cruzeiro 2–1 on 25 January; former international players Bernard and Hulk scored the goals after Kaio Jorge had opened the scoring for the opponents. On 12 February, manager Jorge Sampaoli was dismissed with a record of five draws and two wins, which left the team reliant on other results on the last group stage matchday. Two days later, caretaker manager Lucas Gonçalves oversaw a 7–2 win away to Itabirito to guarantee a place in the semi-finals.

Atlético Mineiro advanced to the final by defeating América Mineiro in the semi-finals. After a 1–1 draw at home in the first leg and a goalless draw away on 1 March, the side won 4–2 in a penalty shootout. Between the two legs, the club hired Argentinian Eduardo Domínguez as the new manager.

== Match ==
In a first half with many fouls and few chances, Cruzeiro tried long-range shots from Kaiki and Lucas Silva, while Atlético Mineiro's Renan Lodi also made an attempt.

The second half was short on chances for its first 15 minutes, until Cruzeiro's Matheus Pereira passed to Gerson on the left side of the attack. He crossed the ball to Kaio Jorge, who headed it past Atlético Mineiro goalkeeper Everson for the only goal of the game, given after video assistant referee review. Atlético Mineiro sought an equaliser, but were unable to create goalscoring opportunities.

=== Brawl ===
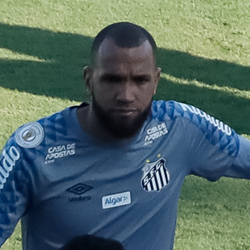
Atlético Mineiro goalkeeper Everson (pictured 2019) was sent off for a confrontation that led to the mass brawl.

In the last minute, Cruzeiro went on the counterattack, and Pereira took a shot that was blocked by Everson. Christian and Everson challenged each other for the rebounded ball, and the goalkeeper brought down the Cruzeiro midfielder before placing his knee in Christian's chest. Cruzeiro players reacted by pushing Everson into his goalpost, causing a mass brawl that involved nearly all players, and the Atlético Mineiro masseur. The fight was later broken up by the stadium's security and military police.

Referee Matheus Delgado Candançan recorded two sendings-off during the game: in the sixth minute of added time, he sent off Everson for the knee on Christian, and he sent off Christian for kicking the goalkeeper in the head with his shin while the goalkeeper had the ball under control. The referee noted that he did not show a red card during the game, because of the brawl that immediately followed.

Though he was again unable to show red cards due to the brawl, Delgado Candançan recorded another 21 sendings-off due to the fight, recording them all under the same explanation. The 11 Cruzeiro players sent off were Cássio, Fagner, Fabrício Bruno, João Marcelo, Lucas Villalba, Kauã Prates, Lucas Romero, Matheus Henrique, Walace, Gerson and Kaio Jorge. The 10 Atlético Mineiro players sent off were Gabriel Delfim, Ángelo Preciado, Lyanco, Ruan Tressoldi, Júnior Alonso, Renan Lodi, Alan Franco, Alan Minda, Mateo Cassierra and Hulk.

The 23 sendings-off set a new record in a Brazilian football match. The previous record was 22 for a game between Portuguesa and Botafogo in the 1954 Torneio Rio–São Paulo, and a 1971 friendly between Santa Catarina rivals Avaí and Figueirense in 1971. The world record is held by a game between Claypole and Victoriano Arenas in the Argentinian fifth division on 27 February 2011, in which a brawl led to the sending-off of the eleven players and seven substitutes of both teams.

=== Details ===
8 March 2026
18:00

Cruzeiro	1–0	Atlético Mineiro
Kaio Jorge 60'	Report

Mineirão, Belo Horizonte
Attendance: 49,675
Referee: Matheus Delgado Candançan

Cruzeiro	Atlético Mineiro

GK	1	(Brazil) Cássio	(red card) 90+6'
RB	12	(Brazil) William	(yellow card) 90+6'
CB	15	(Brazil) Fabrício Bruno	(red card) 90+6'
CB	25	(Argentina) Lucas Villalba	(yellow card) 76' (red card) 90+6'
LB	6	(Brazil) Kaiki Bruno	(yellow card) 9'
CM	29	(Argentina) Lucas Romero	(red card) 90+6'
CM	16	(Brazil) Lucas Silva (c)		(substituted off) 74'
RW	88	(Brazil) Christian	(red card) 90+6'
AM	10	(Brazil) Matheus Pereira	(yellow card) 26'
LW	11	(Brazil) Gerson	(red card) 90+6'	(substituted off) 64'
CF	19	(Brazil) Kaio Jorge	(yellow card) 82' (red card) 90+6'	(substituted off) 87'
Substitutes:
GK	31	(Brazil) Matheus Cunha
DF	23	(Brazil) Fagner	(red card) 90+6'
DF	34	(Brazil) Jonathan Jesus
DF	36	(Brazil) Kauã Prates	(red card) 90+6'
DF	43	(Brazil) João Marcelo	(red card) 90+6'
MF	5	(Brazil) Walace	(red card) 90+6'
MF	8	(Brazil) Matheus Henrique	(red card) 90+6'	(substituted on) 74'
MF	77	(Brazil) Japa
FW	20	(Brazil) Bruno Rodrigues		(substituted on) 64'
FW	91	(Brazil) Chico da Costa
FW	94	(Belgium) Wanderson		(substituted on) 87'
FW	99	(Ecuador) Keny Arroyo
Manager:
(Brazil) Tite

GK	22	(Brazil) Everson	(red card) 90+6'
RB	2	(Brazil) Natanael	(yellow card) 71'	(substituted off) 76'
CB	4	(Brazil) Ruan Tressoldi	(yellow card) 58' (red card) 90+6'
CB	14	(Brazil) Vitor Hugo	(yellow card) 33'
LB	16	(Brazil) Renan Lodi	(yellow card) 90+4' (red card) 90+6'
CM	21	(Ecuador) Alan Franco	(red card) 90+6'
CM	30	(Brazil) Victor Hugo		(substituted off) 66'
RW	39	(Guinea) Mamady Cissé		(substituted off) 16'
AM	11	(Brazil) Bernard		(substituted off) 66'
LW	92	(Brazil) Dudu
CF	7	(Brazil) Hulk (c)	(red card) 90+6'
Substitutes:
GK	1	(Brazil) Gabriel Delfim	(red card) 90+6'
DF	6	(Paraguay) Júnior Alonso	(red card) 90+6'
DF	13	(Brazil) Lyanco	(red card) 90+6'
DF	23	(Ecuador) Ángelo Preciado	(red card) 90+6'	(substituted on) 76'
DF	36	(Brazil) Kauã Pascini
MF	10	(Brazil) Gustavo Scarpa		(substituted on) 76'
MF	17	(Brazil) Igor Gomes		(substituted on) 16' (substituted off) 76'
MF	19	(Brazil) Reinier
MF	25	(Argentina) Tomás Pérez
FW	9	(Colombia) Mateo Cassierra	(red card) 90+6'	(substituted on) 66'
FW	27	(Ecuador) Alan Minda	(red card) 90+6'	(substituted on) 66'
FW	28	(Argentina) Tomás Cuello
Manager:
(Argentina) Eduardo Domínguez

== Post-match ==
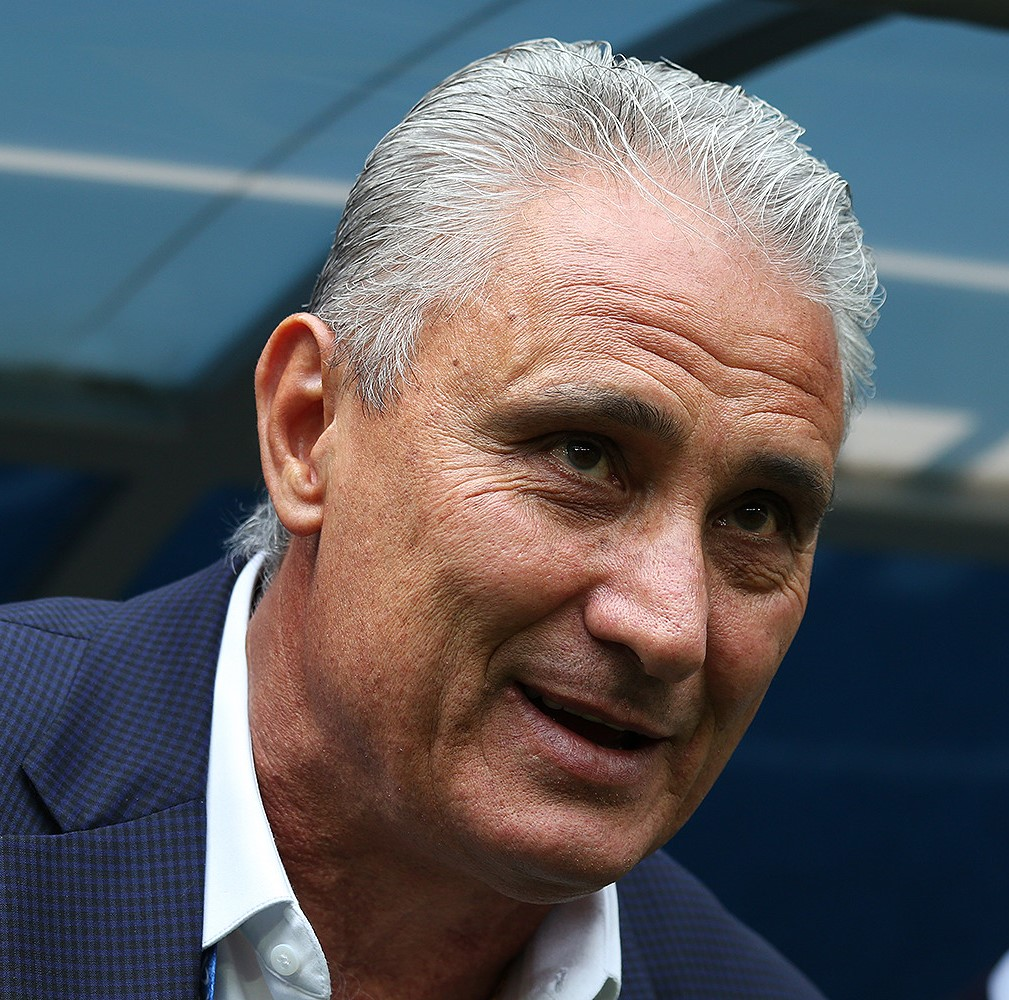
Cruzeiro manager Tite (pictured 2018) equalled Telê Santana's achievement of winning the four most important state championships in Brazil.

Kaio Jorge was selected as man of the match. With seven goals from seven games, he was the top scorer of the season as well.

By winning the Campeonato Mineiro, Cruzeiro manager Tite equalled Telê Santana's achievement of winning the four most important state championships in Brazil. He had previously won the Campeonato Paulista for Corinthians, the Campeonato Carioca for Flamengo, and the Campeonato Gaúcho for Grêmio, Internacional and Caxias.

Atlético Mineiro forward Hulk, who was sent off, wrote on Instagram "I apologise to everyone who was in the stadium, to those who watched it on television, and especially to the children who look up to football. What we saw on the pitch is not the example we want to set". Cruzeiro goalkeeper Cássio and forward Dudu also apologised for taking part in the brawl.

=== Consequences ===
Brazilian regulations rule that a suspension must be served in the same competition, or a competition organised by the same body, in this case the Federação Mineira de Futebol. The players' suspensions did not carry over to the Campeonato Brasileiro Série A or any other competition organised by the Brazilian Football Confederation, nor to continental competitions run by CONMEBOL. The Tribunal de Justiça Desportiva in Minas Gerais reached out-of-court settlements with both clubs, punished the 23 sent-off players with four-match bans in the next Campeonato Mineiro and fined both clubs R$400,000. Lucas Silva of Cruzeiro and Victor Hugo of Atlético Mineiro would also have been tried by the court, but received no punishment due to not being sent off in the game.

The Civil Police of the State of Minas Gerais investigated if any players had broken article 201 of the General Sporting Law by inciting a riot. The Military Police also registered several criminal offences committed by fans during the match: a 14-year-old girl was hit in the head by a glass thrown by an unidentified person, a Cruzeiro fan was arrested for allegedly shouting racial slurs at a security guard, and another fan reported the theft of a mobile phone, which was recovered by police. Tear gas was also used to prevent a pitch invasion by Atlético Mineiro fans at the end of the game.
