= 2026 Cruzeiro Esporte Clube season =

Cruzeiro
2026 season
- Owner: Pedro Lourenço
- President: Lidson Potsch
- Manager: Tite (until 15 March); Wesley Carvalho (interim); Artur Jorge (from 23 March)
- Stadium: Mineirão
- Série A: 3rd
- Campeonato Mineiro: Winners
- Copa do Brasil: Quarter-finals
- Copa Libertadores: Round of 16
- Top goalscorer: League: Kaio Jorge (12); All: Kaio Jorge (22)
Home colours	Away colours	Third colours

The 2026 season is the 106th in the Cruzeiro Esporte Clube's existence.

Along with the Campeonato Brasileiro Série A, the club also compete in the Campeonato Mineiro, in the Copa do Brasil and in the Copa Libertadores.

== Kits ==
Supplier: Adidas
Sponsors: Betnacional (Main sponsor / shorts) / Perdigão S.A. (Lower shirt) / Vilma Alimentos (Back of the shirt) / Supermercados BH (Lower back) / Grupo Cimed (Shoulder) / Omo (Sleeves) / Vitória Cup (Shorts) / Kodilar (Socks)

Kits from the 2026 season
Home	Home alt.^{1}

Kits from the 2026 season
Home	Away	Away alt.^{1}	Away alt.^{2}	Third	Goalkeeper^{1}	Goalkeeper^{2}	Goalkeeper^{3}	Goalkeeper^{4}

=== Kit information ===
This is Adidas's 6th year supplying Cruzeiro kit, having taken over from Umbro at the beginning of the 2020 season. (Note: The deal was signed in 10 April 2019.)

- Home: TBD

=== Kit usage ===
As of 18 March 2026

Kit	Combination	Usage
Kits from the 2026 season
Home	Blue shirt, white shorts and white socks.	Campeonato Brasileiro: used at home against Coritiba, Corinthians and Vasco da Gama; used away against Botafogo and Athletico Paranaense.; Campeonato Mineiro: used at home against Democrata-GV América Mineiro and Pouso Alegre; used away against Atlético Mineiro; used in the final against Atlético Mineiro.
Home alt.^{1}	Blue shirt, blue shorts (2025 season) and blue socks (2025 season).	Campeonato Brasileiro: used away against Mirassol.; Campeonato Mineiro: used away against Betim.
Kits from the 2025 season
Home	Blue shirt with white sleeves, white shorts and white socks.	Campeonato Mineiro: used at home against Pouso Alegre and Uberlândia; used away against Tombense.
Away	White and blue-striped shirt, blue shorts and blue socks.	
Away alt.^{1}	White and blue-striped shirt, white shorts (2026 season) and white socks (2026 season).	Campeonato Mineiro: used away against URT and Pouso Alegre.
Away alt.^{2}	White and blue-striped shirt, blue shorts and white socks (2026 season).	Campeonato Brasileiro: used away against Flamengo.
Third	Blue shirt, blue shorts and blue socks; all details in gold	
Goalkeeper^{1}	Lime shirt, lime shorts and lime socks.	Campeonato Brasileiro: used at home against Coritiba Corinthians and Vasco da Gama; used away against Botafogo.; Campeonato Mineiro: used at home against Uberlândia.
Goalkeeper^{2}	Green shirt, green shorts and green socks.	Campeonato Brasileiro: used away against Flamengo and Athletico Paranaense.; Campeonato Mineiro: used at home against Pouso Alegre; used away against Tombense and Atlético Mineiro; used in the final against Atlético Mineiro.
Goalkeeper^{3}	Blue shirt, blue shorts and blue socks.	
Goalkeeper^{4}	Silver shirt, navy shorts and navy socks.	Campeonato Brasileiro: used away against Mirassol.; Campeonato Mineiro: used at home against Pouso Alegre, Democrata-GV and América Mineiro; used away against Betim, URT and Pouso Alegre.

== Current squad ==
As of 6 August 2026

Note: Flags indicate national team as defined under FIFA eligibility rules; some limited exceptions apply. Players may hold more than one non-FIFA nationality.

No.	Pos.	Nation	Player
1	GK	BRA	Cássio
2	DF	BRA	Kauã Moraes
5	MF	BRA	Zé Lucas
7	MF	BRA	Matheus Henrique
8	MF	BRA	Gerson
9	FW	BRA	Bruno Rodrigues (on loan from Palmeiras)
10	MF	BRA	Matheus Pereira
11	FW	BRA	Marquinhos
12	DF	BRA	William
15	DF	BRA	Fabrício Bruno
16	MF	BRA	Lucas Silva (captain)
17	FW	COL	Luis Sinisterra
19	FW	BRA	Kaio Jorge
20	FW	BRA	Wesley (on loan from Al Nassr)
22	FW	COL	Néiser Villarreal
23	DF	BRA	Fagner
24	GK	BRA	Marcelo Eráclito

No.	Pos.	Nation	Player
25	DF	ARG	Lucas Villalba
27	DF	ARG	Gabriel Rojas
29	MF	ARG	Lucas Romero (vice-captain)
34	DF	BRA	Jonathan Jesus
40	MF	BRA	Rhuan Gabriel
41	GK	BRA	Léo Aragão
43	DF	BRA	João Marcelo
51	GK	BRA	Vitor Lamounier
57	FW	BRA	Rayan Lelis
67	FW	POR	João Costa (on loan from Al-Ettifaq)
70	FW	JPN	Kaique Kenji
77	FW	BRA	Gabriel Pec
81	GK	BRA	Otávio
94	FW	BEL	Wanderson
97	FW	URU	Luciano Rodríguez (on loan from Neom)
99	FW	ECU	Keny Arroyo

=== Youth team ===
Note: Flags indicate national team as defined under FIFA eligibility rules; some limited exceptions apply. Players may hold more than one non-FIFA nationality.

No.	Pos.	Nation	Player
38	MF	BRA	Felipe Morais
42	MF	BRA	Nicolas
49	FW	BRA	Ruan Índio
58	MF	BRA	Eduardo Pape

No.	Pos.	Nation	Player
60	DF	BRA	Gustavinho
84	DF	BRA	Kelvin
—	GK	BRA	Felipe Teixeira

=== Other players under contract ===
Note: Flags indicate national team as defined under FIFA eligibility rules; some limited exceptions apply. Players may hold more than one non-FIFA nationality.

No.	Pos.	Nation	Player
—	MF	PAR	Fabrizio Peralta
—	FW	BRA	Chico da Costa

=== Out on loan ===
Note: Flags indicate national team as defined under FIFA eligibility rules; some limited exceptions apply. Players may hold more than one non-FIFA nationality.

No.	Pos.	Nation	Player
—	GK	BRA	Matheus Cunha (at Internacional until 30 June 2027)
—	DF	BRA	Bruno Alves (at Norwich until 30 June 2027)
—	MF	BRA	Ian Luccas (at Athletic-MG until 30 November 2026)
—	MF	BRA	Japa (at Mirassol until 31 December 2026)
—	MF	BRA	Murilo Rhikman (at Sport Recife until 30 November 2026)
—	MF	BRA	Walace (at Vitória until 31 December 2026)

No.	Pos.	Nation	Player
—	FW	BRA	Chico da Costa (at Sport Recife until 30 November 2026)
—	FW	BRA	Gabriel Barbosa (at Santos until 31 December 2026)
—	FW	BRA	Gui Meira (at Feirense until 30 June 2027)
—	FW	ARG	Lautaro Díaz (at Racing until 30 June 2027)
—	FW	BRA	Rodriguinho (at Fortaleza until 30 November 2026)
—	FW	BRA	Tevis (at Yokohama Marinos until 31 December 2026)

=== First-team staff ===
Position	Name	Nationality
Head coach	Artur Jorge	POR
Assistant coaches	João Cardoso	POR
Assistant coaches	André Cunha	POR
Assistant coaches	Wesley Carvalho	BRA
Analyst	Diogo Dias	POR
Analyst	José Barros	POR
Goalkeeping coaches	João Paulo Lacerda	BRA
Goalkeeping coaches	Robertinho	BRA
Fitness coach	Tiago Lopes	POR
Physiologist	Nathália Arnosti	BRA
Performance analyst	Rodrigo Mira	POR
Performance analyst	Henrique Américo	BRA

== Pre-season and friendlies ==
4 July 2026 Friendly	Cruzeiro (Brazil)	2-0	(Uruguay) Defensor	Belo Horizonte
11:00 UTC−3	Kaio Jorge 40'; Felipe Morais 90'			Stadium: Arena Independência; Attendance: 19,382; Referee: André Luiz Skettino Bento

12 July 2026 Friendly	Cruzeiro (Minas Gerais)	1–3	(Rio Grande do Sul) Grêmio	Brasília
17:00 UTC−3				Stadium: Estádio Nacional Mané Garrincha

== Competitions ==
=== Overview ===
Competition	First match	Last match	Starting round	Final position	Record							
Competition	First match	Last match	Starting round	Final position	Pld	W	D	L	GF	GA	GD	Win %
Campeonato Mineiro	10 January	8 March	First stage	Winners	11	8	0	3	18	8	+10	72.73
Copa do Brasil	22 April	1 September	Fifth round	Quarter-finals	6	2	3	1	7	5	+2	33.33
Copa Libertadores	7 April	19 August	Group stage	Round of 16	8	3	3	2	10	6	+4	37.50
Campeonato Brasileiro Série A	29 January	2 December	Matchday 1	TBD	33	17	6	10	52	46	+6	51.52
Total					58	30	12	16	87	65	+22	51.72

Last updated: 29 October 2026
Source: Competitions

=== Campeonato Mineiro ===
==== First stage ====
Pos	Team	Pld	W	D	L	GF	GA	GD	Pts	Qualification or relegation
1	Cruzeiro	8	5	0	3	14	7	+7	15	Knockout stage
2	North	8	3	2	3	14	11	+3	11	
3	Itabirito	8	2	1	5	10	17	−7	7	
4	Athletic Club (R)	8	1	4	3	7	13	−6	7	2027 Módulo II

Source: FMF
(R) Relegated

10 January 1	Cruzeiro	1–2	Pouso Alegre	Belo Horizonte
18:30 UTC−3	Kauã Prates 90+5'	Report	Alexandre 6'; Gabriel Tota 55'	Stadium: Mineirão; Attendance: 35,139; Referee: Murilo Francisco Misson Júnior

14 January 2	Tombense	1–2	Cruzeiro	Uberlândia
21:30 UTC−3	Pedro Oliveira 65'	Report	Kaique Kenji 10'; Japa 25'	Stadium: Parque do Sabiá; Attendance: 3,134; Referee: Hieger Túlio Cardoso

17 January 3	Cruzeiro	5–0	Uberlândia	Belo Horizonte
18:30 UTC−3	Kaio Jorge 16'; Christian 37', 80'; Wanderson 47'; Lucas Romero 59'	Report		Stadium: Mineirão; Attendance: 38,193; Referee: André Luiz Skettino Policarpo Bento

22 January 4	Cruzeiro	0–1	Democrata-GV	Belo Horizonte
18:30 UTC−3		Report	Bryan Gabriel 61'	Stadium: Mineirão; Attendance: 20,285; Referee: Ronei Cândido Alves

25 January 5	Atlético Mineiro	2–1	Cruzeiro	Belo Horizonte
18:00 UTC−3	Bernard 56'; Hulk 68'	Report	Kaio Jorge 26'	Stadium: Arena MRV; Attendance: 39,332; Referee: Davi de Oliveira Lacerda

1 February 6	Betim	0–1	Cruzeiro	Betim
20:00 UTC−3		Report	Matheus Pereira 90+10'	Stadium: Arena URBSAN; Attendance: 2,912; Referee: Murilo Francisco Misson Júnior

8 February 7	Cruzeiro	2–0	América Mineiro	Belo Horizonte
18:00 UTC−3	Kaio Jorge 3' (pen.), 37'	Report		Stadium: Mineirão; Attendance: 28,804; Referee: André Luiz Skettino Policarpo Bento

14 February 8	URT	1–2	Cruzeiro	Patos de Minas
19:00 UTC−3	Mateus Peloggia 90+10'	Report	Kaio Jorge 27'; Arroyo 45+6'	Stadium: Arena DB; Attendance: 5.198; Referee: Hieger Túlio Cardoso

==== Semi-finals ====
21 February First leg	Pouso Alegre	1–2	Cruzeiro	Pouso Alegre
18:30 UTC−3	Romário 89' (pen.)	Report	Lucas Silva 64'; Bruno Rodrigues 75'	Stadium: Manduzão; Attendance: 13,632; Referee: André Luiz Skettino Policarpo Bento

28 February Second leg	Cruzeiro	1–0 (3–1 agg.)	Pouso Alegre	Belo Horizonte
18:30 UTC−3	Kaio Jorge 90+7'	Report		Stadium: Mineirão; Attendance: 31,304; Referee: Daniel da Cunha Oliveira Filho

===== Final =====
8 March Single match	Cruzeiro	1–0	Atlético Mineiro	Belo Horizonte
18:00 UTC−3	Kaio Jorge 60'	Report		Stadium: Mineirão; Attendance: 49,675; Referee: Matheus Delgado Candançan

=== Campeonato Brasileiro Série A ===
==== League table ====
Pos	Team	Pld	W	D	L	GF	GA	GD	Pts	Qualification or relegation
1	Flamengo (Q)	34	23	7	4	71	29	+42	76	Qualification for Copa Libertadores group stage
2	Palmeiras (Q)	34	21	10	3	62	23	+39	73	Qualification for Copa Libertadores group stage
3	Cruzeiro (X)	34	18	6	10	55	48	+7	60	Qualification for Copa Libertadores group stage
4	Fluminense	33	15	9	9	52	42	+10	54	Qualification for Copa Libertadores group stage
5	Athletico Paranaense	34	15	9	10	51	43	+8	54	Qualification for Copa Libertadores second stage

Updated to match(es) played on 5 November 2026. Source: CBF
Rules for classification: 1) points; 2) wins; 3) goal difference; 4) goals scored; 5) head-to-head results (only between two teams); 6) fewest red cards; 7) fewest yellow cards; 8) drawing of lots.
(Q) Qualified for the phase indicated; (X) Assured of Copa Sudamericana, but may still qualify for Copa Libertadores

==== Results by round ====
Round	1	2	3	4	5	6	7	8	9	10	11	12	13	14	15	16	17	18	19	20	21	22	23	24	25	26	27	28	29	30	31	32	33	34	35	36	37	38
Ground	A	H	A	H	A	H	A	H	H	A	H	H	A	H	A	A	H	H	A	H	A	H	A	H	A	H	A	A	H	A	A	H	A	H	H	A	A	H
Result	L	L	D	D	L	D	L	D	W	L	W	W	W	L	W	D	W	D	W	L	W	W	W	W	L	W	L	W	W	L	W	W	W					
Position	20	20	20	19	20	19	19	20	17	19	17	16	12	15	11	13	9	11	8	11	7	5	5	5	5	5	6	6	5	6	5	3	3	3				

Updated to match(es) played on 29 October 2026. Source: Matches
A = Away; H = Home; W = Win; D = Draw; L = Loss; P = Postponed

==== Matches ====
29 January 1	Botafogo	4–0	Cruzeiro	Rio de Janeiro
21:30 UTC−3	Danilo 48', 85'; Matheus Martins 76'; Artur 90+1'	Report		Stadium: Nilton Santos; Attendance: 16,901; Referee: Matheus Delgado Candançan

5 February 2	Cruzeiro	1–2	Coritiba	Belo Horizonte
21:30 UTC−3	Matheus Pereira 19'	Report	Lavega 45'; Breno Lopes 53'	Stadium: Mineirão; Attendance: 15,270; Referee: Bruno Arleu de Araújo

11 February 3	Mirassol	2–2	Cruzeiro	Mirassol
19:00 UTC−3	Nathan Fogaça 38'; Negueba 53'	Report	Wanderson 23'; Kaio Jorge 85' (pen.)	Stadium: José Maria de Campos Maia; Attendance: 5,134; Referee: Bráulio da Silva Machado

25 February 4	Cruzeiro	1–1	Corinthians	Belo Horizonte
20:00 UTC−3	Matheus Pereira 9'	Report	João Pedro 81'	Stadium: Mineirão; Attendance: 20,267; Referee: Davi de Oliveira Lacerda

11 March 5	Flamengo	2–0	Cruzeiro	Rio de Janeiro
21:30 UTC−3	Pedro 5'; Carrascal 90+8'	Report		Stadium: Maracanã; Attendance: 47,214; Referee: Flávio Rodrigues de Souza

15 March 6	Cruzeiro	3–3	Vasco da Gama	Belo Horizonte
20:30 UTC−3	Christian 8'; Villarreal 70'; Japa 90+5'	Report	Cauan Barros 52', 54'; Brenner 86'	Stadium: Mineirão; Attendance: 22,352; Referee: Lucas Paulo Torezin

18 March 7	Athletico Paranaense	2–1	Cruzeiro	Curitiba
19:30 UTC−3	Mendoza 1'; Viveros 10' (pen.)	Report	Villarreal 58'	Stadium: Arena da Baixada; Attendance: 20,733; Referee: Rodrigo José Pereira de Lima

22 March 8	Cruzeiro	0–0	Santos	Belo Horizonte
16:00 UTC−3		Report		Stadium: Mineirão; Attendance: 43,252; Referee: Ramon Abatti Abel

1 April 9	Cruzeiro	3–0	Vitória	Belo Horizonte
20:00 UTC−3	Christian 33'; Kauã Moraes 36'; Kaio Jorge 39'	Report		Stadium: Mineirão; Attendance: 23,907; Referee: Yuri Elino Ferreira da Cruz

4 April 10	São Paulo	4–1	Cruzeiro	São Paulo
18:30 UTC−3	Calleri 12' (pen.); Ferreira 16', 62', 90+2'	Report	Christian 47'	Stadium: Morumbi; Attendance: 36,650; Referee: Rodrigo José Pereira de Lima

12 April 11	Cruzeiro	2–1	Red Bull Bragantino	Belo Horizonte
18:30 UTC−3	Villarreal 18'; Christian 49'	Report	Hurtado 6'	Stadium: Mineirão; Attendance: 38,674; Referee: Ramon Abatti Abel

18 April 12	Cruzeiro	2–0	Grêmio	Belo Horizonte
20:30 UTC−3	Christian 51'; Lucas Romero 66'	Report		Stadium: Mineirão; Attendance: 28,279; Referee: Raphael Claus

25 April 13	Remo	0–1	Cruzeiro	Belém
18:30 UTC−3		Report	Arroyo 34'	Stadium: Baenão; Attendance: 12,993; Referee: Wilton Pereira Sampaio

2 May 14	Cruzeiro	1–3	Atlético Mineiro	Belo Horizonte
21:00 UTC−3	Kaio Jorge 86' (pen.)	Report	Alan Minda 12'; Maycon 32' (pen.); Cassierra 72'	Stadium: Mineirão; Attendance: 53,921; Referee: Flávio Rodrigues de Souza

9 May 15	Bahia	1–2	Cruzeiro	Salvador
21:00 UTC−3	Luciano Juba 27' (pen.)	Report	Kauã Moraes 41'; Kaique Kenji 86'	Stadium: Fonte Nova; Attendance: 30,423; Referee: Rodrigo José Pereira de Lima

16 May 16	Palmeiras	1–1	Cruzeiro	Barueri
21:00 UTC−3	Felipe Anderson 19'	Report	Arroyo 10'	Stadium: Arena Barueri; Attendance: 27,657; Referee: Sávio Pereira Sampaio

24 May 17	Cruzeiro	2–1	Chapecoense	Belo Horizonte
16:00 UTC−3	Kaio Jorge 26' (pen.); Sinisterra 72'	Report	João Paulo 78'	Stadium: Mineirão; Attendance: 44,625; Referee: Flávio Rodrigues de Souza

31 May 18	Cruzeiro	1–1	Fluminense	Belo Horizonte
20:30 UTC−3	Matheus Pereira 74'	Report	John Kennedy 42'	Stadium: Mineirão; Attendance: 29,662; Referee: Lucas Casagrande

22 July 19	Internacional	1–2	Cruzeiro	Porto Alegre
21:30 UTC−3	Carbonero 83'	Report	Kaio Jorge 11'; Matheus Pereira 64'	Stadium: Beira-Rio; Attendance: 12,266; Referee: Flávio Rodrigues de Souza

26 July 20	Cruzeiro	0–1	Botafogo	Belo Horizonte
16:00 UTC−3		Report	Justino 41'	Stadium: Mineirão; Attendance: 39,294; Referee: Davi de Oliveira Lacerda

30 July 21	Coritiba	0–1	Cruzeiro	Curitiba
21:30 UTC−3		Report	Matheus Pereira 66'	Stadium: Couto Pereira; Attendance: 18,129; Referee: Wagner do Nascimento Magalhães

9 August 22	Cruzeiro	3–1	Mirassol	Belo Horizonte
11:00 UTC−3	João Marcelo 12'; Kaio Jorge 76'; Wesley 84'	Report	Reinaldo 27' (pen.)	Stadium: Mineirão; Attendance: 57,850; Referee: Lucas Casagrande

16 August 23	Corinthians	1–2	Cruzeiro	São Paulo
19:30 UTC−3	Gustavo Henrique 58'	Report	Bruno Rodrigues 36'; Wanderson 82'	Stadium: Neo Química Arena; Attendance: 38,261; Referee: Davi de Oliveira Lacerda

22 August 24	Cruzeiro	2–1	Flamengo	Belo Horizonte
20:30 UTC−3	Arroyo 55'; Matheus Pereira 90+5'	Report	Pedro 22'	Stadium: Mineirão; Attendance: 34,166; Referee: Rodrigo José Pereira de Lima

29 August 25	Vasco da Gama	3–1	Cruzeiro	Rio de Janeiro
21:20 UTC−3	Tchê Tchê 33'; Lucas Freitas 55'; David 90+2'	Report	Felipe Morais 90+5'	Stadium: São Januário; Attendance: 19,021; Referee: Fernando Antônio Mendes de Salles Nascimento Filho

6 September 26	Cruzeiro	3–1	Athletico Paranaense	Belo Horizonte
16:00 UTC−3	Matheus Pereira 30'; Lucas Romero 71'; Kaio Jorge 82' (pen.)	Report	João Cruz 45'	Stadium: Mineirão; Attendance: 26,320; Referee: Daiane Muniz

12 September 27	Santos	2–1	Cruzeiro	Santos
21:00 UTC−3	Rollheiser 28'; Fabrício Bruno 32' (o.g.)	Report	Matheus Pereira 90'	Stadium: Vila Belmiro; Attendance: 13,877; Referee: Bruno Arleu de Araújo

20 September 28	Vitória	1–3	Cruzeiro	Salvador
16:00 UTC−3	Renê 39'	Report	Arroyo 46'; Villalba 66'; Matheus Pereira 90+7'	Stadium: Barradão; Attendance: 12,856; Referee: Matheus Delgado Candançan

7 October 29	Cruzeiro	2–0	São Paulo	Belo Horizonte
21:30 UTC−3	Kaio Jorge 44'; Zé Lucas 57'	Report		Stadium: Mineirão; Attendance: 18,608; Referee: Wilton Pereira Sampaio

12 October 30	Red Bull Bragantino	4–2	Cruzeiro	Bragança Paulista
21:00 UTC−3	Lucas Barbosa 13'; Kaio Jorge 21' (o.g.); Eric Ramires 30'; José María Herrera 90+1'	Report	Zé Lucas 44'; Matheus Henrique 89'	Stadium: Cícero de Souza Marques; Attendance: 3,879; Referee: Sávio Pereira Sampaio

18 October 31	Grêmio	2–4	Cruzeiro	Porto Alegre
16:00 UTC−3	Carlos Vinícius 17' (pen.); Pavon 41'	Report	Kaio Jorge 23', 48', 61'; João Marcelo 80'	Stadium: Arena do Grêmio; Attendance: 31,256; Referee: João Vitor Gobi

23 October 32	Cruzeiro	1–0	Remo	Belo Horizonte
20:00 UTC−3	Fabrício Bruno 45+5'	Report		Stadium: Mineirão; Attendance: 29,516; Referee: Bruno Arleu de Araújo

29 October 33	Atlético Mineiro	0–1	Cruzeiro	Belo Horizonte
19:30 UTC−3		Report	Kaio Jorge 4'	Stadium: Arena MRV; Attendance: 38,072; Referee: Raphael Claus

5 November 34	Cruzeiro	v	Bahia	Belo Horizonte
21:30 UTC−3		Report		Stadium: Mineirão; Referee: Rafael Rodrigo Klein

18 November 35	Cruzeiro	v	Palmeiras	Belo Horizonte
20:30 UTC−3		Report		Stadium: Mineirão

21 November 36	Chapecoense	v	Cruzeiro	Chapecó
21:00 UTC−3		Report		Stadium: Arena Condá

28–29 November 37	Fluminense	v	Cruzeiro	Rio de Janeiro
--:-- UTC−3		Report		Stadium: Maracanã

2 December 38	Cruzeiro	v	Internacional	Belo Horizonte
--:-- UTC−3		Report		Stadium: Mineirão

=== Copa Libertadores ===
Pos	Team	Pld	W	D	L	GF	GA	GD	Pts	Qualification	UCA	CRU	BOC	BSC
1	(Chile) Universidad Católica	6	4	1	1	8	4	+4	13	Advance to round of 16	—	0–0	1–2	2–0
2	(Brazil) Cruzeiro	6	3	2	1	8	3	+5	11	Advance to round of 16	1–2	—	1–0	4–0
3	(Argentina) Boca Juniors	6	2	1	3	6	5	+1	7	Transfer to Copa Sudamericana	0–1	1–1	—	3–0
4	(Ecuador) Barcelona	6	1	0	5	2	12	−10	3		1–2	0–1	1–0	—

Source: CONMEBOL
Rules for classification: 1) Points; 2) Head-to-head points; 3) Head-to-head goal difference; 4) Head-to-head goals scored; 5) Goal difference; 6) Goals scored; 7) Red cards; 8) Yellow cards; 9) Drawing of lots.

7 April 1	Barcelona (Ecuador)	0–1	(Brazil) Cruzeiro	Guayaquil, Ecuador
19:00 UTC−3		Report	Matheus Pereira 53'	Stadium: Estadio Monumental Isidro Romero Carbo; Referee: Juan Gabriel Benítez (Paraguay)

15 April 2	Cruzeiro (Brazil)	1–2	(Chile) Universidad Católica	Belo Horizonte, Brazil
19:00 UTC−3	Matheus Pereira 60' (pen.)	Report	Giani 29'; Martínez 90+4'	Stadium: Mineirão; Attendance: 43,929; Referee: Carlos Betancur (Colombia)

28 April 3	Cruzeiro (Brazil)	1–0	(Argentina) Boca Juniors	Belo Horizonte, Brazil
21:30 UTC−3	Villarreal 83'	Report		Stadium: Mineirão; Attendance: 59,126; Referee: Esteban Ostojich (Uruguay)

6 May 4	Universidad Católica (Chile)	0–0	(Brazil) Cruzeiro	Santiago, Chile
23:00 UTC−3				Stadium: Claro Arena; Referee: Andrés Rojas (Colombia)

19 May 5	Boca Juniors (Argentina)	1–1	(Brazil) Cruzeiro	Buenos Aires, Argentina
21:30 UTC−3	Merentiel 15'	Report	Fagner 54'	Stadium: La Bombonera; Referee: Jesús Valenzuela (Venezuela)

28 May 6	Cruzeiro (Brazil)	4–0	(Ecuador) Barcelona	Belo Horizonte, Brazil
21:30 UTC−3	Matheus Pereira 5', 71'; Christian 52'; Sinisterra 55'	Report		Stadium: Mineirão; Attendance: 55,724; Referee: Andrés Matonte (Uruguay)

==== Knockout stage ====
===== Round of 16 =====
12 August First leg	Cruzeiro (Brazil)	1–1	(Brazil) Flamengo	Belo Horizonte, Brazil
21:30 UTC−3	Arroyo 53'	Report	Paquetá 67'	Stadium: Mineirão; Attendance: 60,046; Referee: Yael Falcón Pérez (Argentina)

19 August Second leg	Flamengo (Brazil)	2–1 (3–2 agg.)	(Brazil) Cruzeiro	Rio de Janeiro, Brazil
21:30 UTC−3	de Arrascaeta 35'; Samuel Lino 62'	Report	Romero 51'	Stadium: Maracanã; Attendance: 72,481; Referee: Gustavo Tejera (Uruguay)

=== Copa do Brasil ===
==== Fifth round ====
22 April First leg	Goiás	2–2	Cruzeiro	Goiânia
19:00 UTC−3	Nicolas Vichiatto 11'; Esli García 90+6'	Report	Arroyo 18'; Jonathan Jesus 76'	Stadium: Estádio Serra Dourada; Attendance: 18,725; Referee: Davi de Oliveira Lacerda

12 May Second leg	Cruzeiro	1–0 (3–2 agg.)	Goiás	Belo Horizonte
21:30 UTC−3	Kaio Jorge 32' (pen.)	Report		Stadium: Mineirão; Attendance: 26,337; Referee: Bruno Arleu de Araújo

==== Round of 16 ====
2 August First leg	Chapecoense	0–0	Cruzeiro	Chapecó
18:30 UTC−3		Report		Stadium: Arena Condá; Attendance: 10,328; Referee: Raphael Claus

5 August Second leg	Cruzeiro	2–0 (2–0 agg.)	Chapecoense	Belo Horizonte
19:00 UTC−3	Matheus Henrique 45'; Kaio Jorge 86' (pen.)	Report		Stadium: Mineirão; Attendance: 32,402; Referee: Matheus Delgado Candançan

==== Quarter-finals ====
25 August First leg	Cruzeiro	1–1	Atlético Mineiro	Belo Horizonte
21:00 UTC−3	Arroyo 60'	Report	Renan Lodi 60'	Stadium: Mineirão; Attendance: 59,225; Referee: Flávio Rodrigues de Souza

1 September Second leg	Atlético Mineiro	2–1 (3–2 agg.)	Cruzeiro	Belo Horizonte
21:00 UTC−3	Victor Hugo 78'; Fred 88'	Report	Kaio Jorge 30' (pen.)	Stadium: Arena MRV; Attendance: 42,992; Referee: Raphael Claus
