= Gerson (footballer, born 1997) =

Brazilian footballer (born 1997)

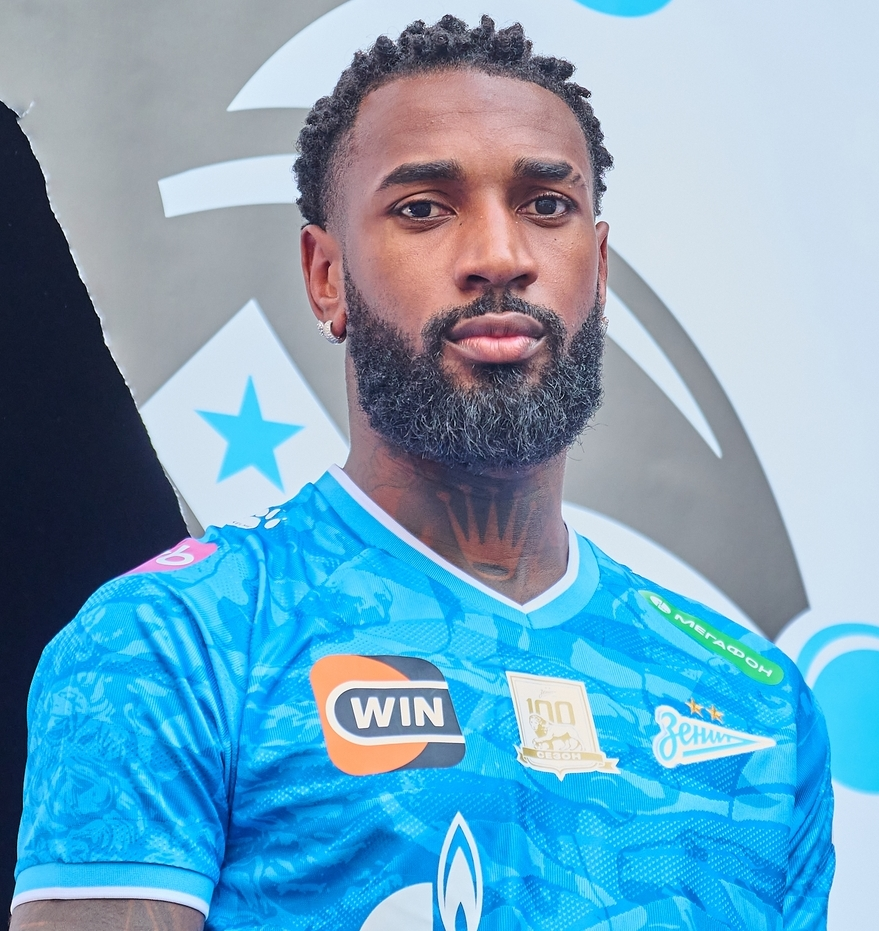
- Gerson with Zenit Saint Petersburg in 2025

Personal information
- Full name: Gerson Santos da Silva
- Date of birth: 20 May 1997 (age 29)
- Place of birth: Belford Roxo, Rio de Janeiro, Brazil
- Height: 1.84 m (6 ft 0 in)
- Position: Midfielder

Team information
- Current team: Cruzeiro
- Number: 8

Youth career
- 2012–2014: Fluminense

Senior career*
Years	Team	Apps	(Gls)
2014–2016	Fluminense	56	(7)
2016–2019	Roma	28	(2)
2018–2019	→ Fiorentina (loan)	36	(3)
2019–2021	Flamengo	87	(7)
2021–2023	Marseille	45	(11)
2023–2025	Flamengo	97	(9)
2025–2026	Zenit Saint Petersburg	12	(1)
2026–	Cruzeiro	37	(0)

International career^{‡}
2015–2016	Brazil U20	10	(0)
2021	Brazil U23	2	(0)
2021–	Brazil	14	(1)
- * Club domestic league appearances and goals as of 29 October 2026 ‡ National team caps and goals as of 10 June 2025

Gerson Santos da Silva (born 20 May 1997), simply known as Gerson (Brazilian Portuguese: [ˈʒɛʁsõw̃]), is a Brazilian professional footballer who plays as a midfielder for Campeonato Brasileiro Série A club Cruzeiro and the Brazil national team.

== Club career ==
=== Fluminense ===
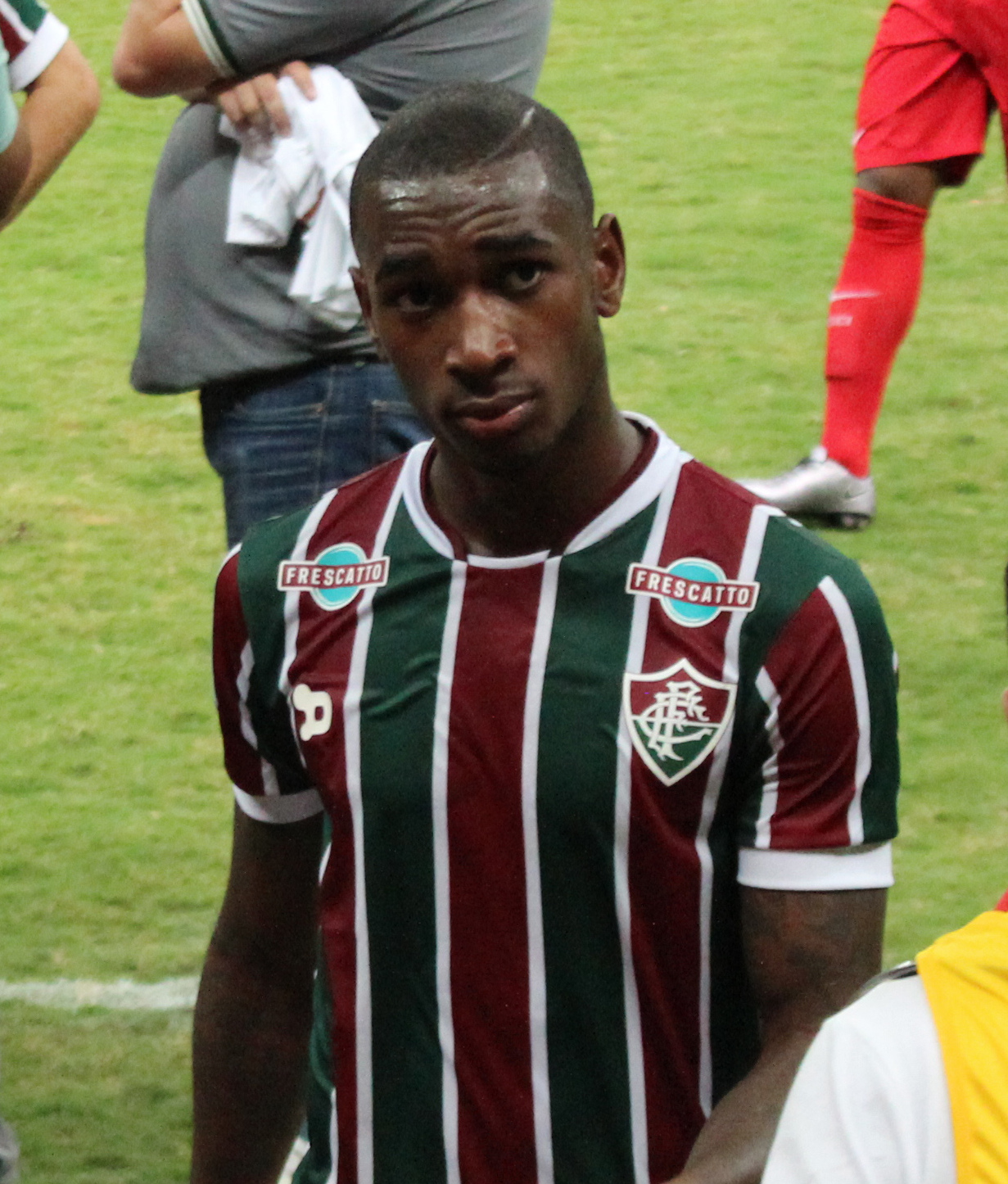
Gerson with Fluminense in 2016

Born in Belford Roxo, Rio de Janeiro, Gerson finished his formation with Fluminense. On 28 August 2014, he was promoted to the main squad, being included in the club's 22-man list for that year's Copa Sudamericana.

On 12 November 2014, Gerson signed a new five-year deal with the club. He was subsequently linked to Barcelona, Atlético Madrid and Juventus throughout the year, but nothing came of it.

Gerson made his senior debut on 22 February 2015, coming on as a second-half substitute in a 0–1 home loss against Vasco for the Campeonato Carioca championship. He scored his first goal for the club on 8 March, netting his team's second in a 3–1 home win against Botafogo. He appeared in 12 matches during the tournament, scoring four goals. Gerson made his Série A debut on 9 May 2015, starting in a 1–0 home win against Joinville.

=== Roma ===
After being linked to several top European clubs in the winter of 2015–16, Gerson sealed a move to Italian club Roma on 4 January for around €15m.

On 27 November 2016, Gerson started his first game with Roma against Pescara.

==== Loan to Fiorentina ====
On 20 July 2018, Gerson joined Fiorentina on loan until 30 June 2019.

=== Flamengo ===
On 12 July 2019 Gerson signed with Brazilian club Flamengo through 2023. The €11.8m (R$49.7m) transfer fee made Gerson the most expensive Brazilian player ever signed by a Brazilian club at the time.

At the beginning of the 2021 season Gerson won the 2020 Campeonato Brasileiro, the 2021 Supercopa do Brasil, the 2021 Campeonato Carioca and helped Flamengo qualify for the round of 16 at the 2021 Copa Libertadores before moving to Olympique de Marseille ahead of the 2021–22 European season.

=== Marseille ===
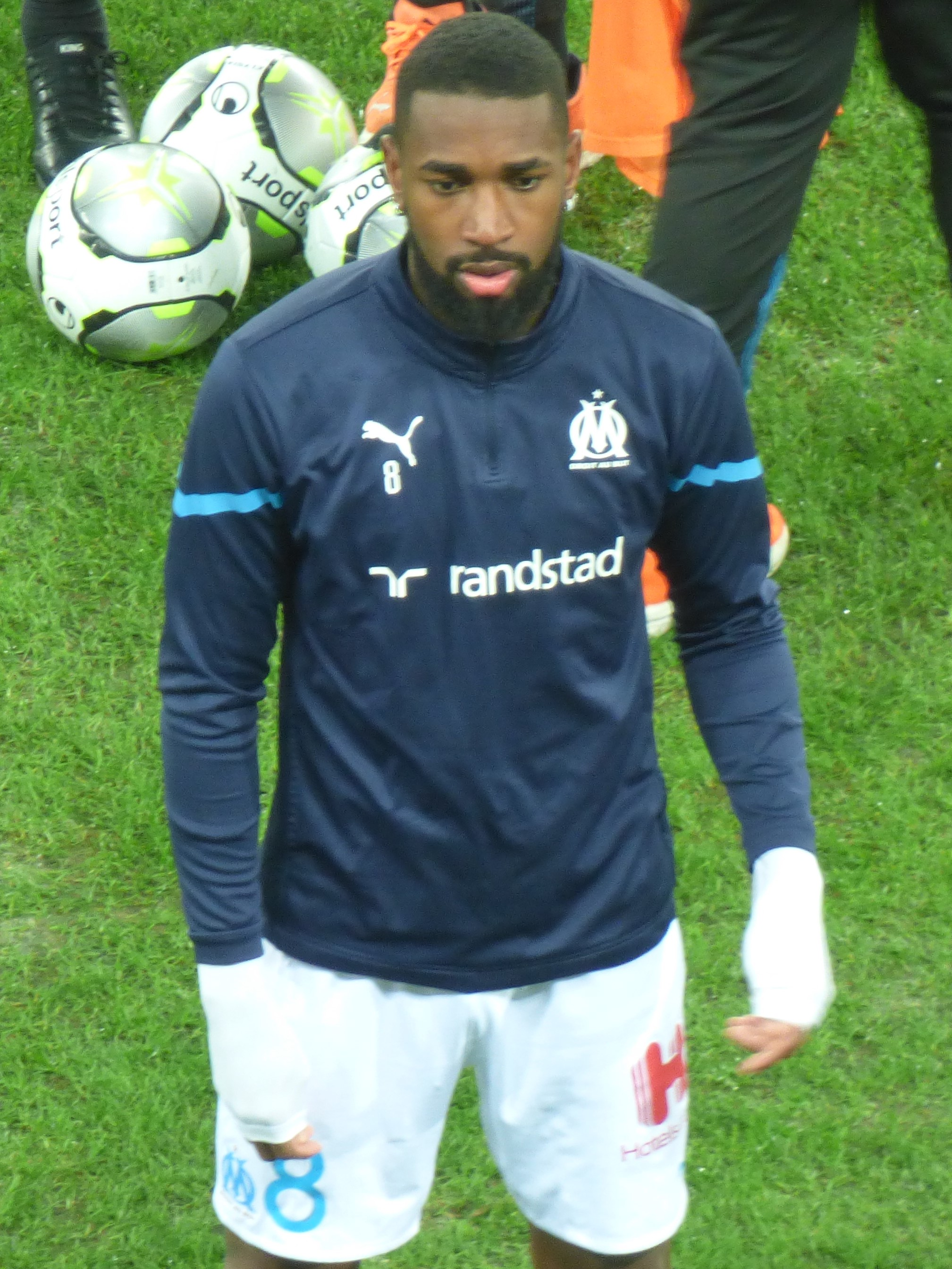
Gerson with Marseille in 2022

On 9 June 2021, French club Olympique de Marseille announced that they reached an agreement in principle with Flamengo for the transfer of Gerson. Following a successful medical examination, he signed a five-year contract with the club, and was presented with the number 8 jersey on 1 July.

=== Return to Flamengo ===
On 31 December 2022 Flamengo announced an agreement with Olympique de Marseille to transfer back Gerson in a €15m transfer fee.

=== Zenit Saint Petersburg ===
On 13 July 2025, Gerson signed a five-year contract with Zenit Saint Petersburg in Russia. He did not have a consistent run of games due to injury, only scoring one goal in twelve matches.

=== Cruzeiro ===
Cruzeiro signed Gerson on 8 January 2026 for €27 million (R$176 million) and €3 million (R$18 million) in bonuses. He signed a four-year contract in hopes of being selected for Brazil's squad at the 2026 FIFA World Cup, after Carlo Ancelotti did not select him while in Russia. Jonathan Jesus was originally part of the deal.

== International career ==
On 27 November 2014, Gerson was called up to the Brazil under-20s for the 2015 South American Youth Football Championship. He made his debut for the side on 15 January 2015, starting in a 2–1 win against Chile, and appeared in all matches during the tournament.

In November 2019 senior national team coach Tite stated that he was monitoring Gerson for a callup, having regretted not giving the player a call-up earlier that year. In December, Gerson asked not to be called for Brazil under-23 team to the South American qualifying tournament for the Summer Olympics to be held in January, citing fatigue after an intense season with Flamengo.

Gerson's decision was met with backlash internally at CBF and it has been rumored that his prolonged absence from the national team is due to that previous request, refusing the call-up for the under-23 team. However, his continued form with Flamengo, winning the Brasileirão, Supercopa, Recopa and Cariocão in 2020, and the Supercopa and Taça Guanabara in 2021, led to more requests from fans and the media for his call-up.

In May 2021, Gerson was eventually summoned to the Brazil under-23 team for friendlies against Cape Verde and Serbia the following month, ahead of the 2020 Olympics. On 17 June 2021, Gerson was named in the Brazil squad for the 2020 Summer Olympics. On 2 July, however, it was announced that Marseille had vetoed his participation in the tournament.

He was first called up to and made his debut for the senior team on 2 September 2021 in a World Cup qualifier against Chile, a 1–0 away victory. He substituted Bruno Guimarães at half-time.

== Career statistics ==
=== Club ===
As of match played 29 October 2026

Appearances and goals by club, season and competition
Club	Season	League			National cup (Note: Includes Copa do Brasil, Coppa Italia, Coupe de France, Russian Cup)		Continental		Other		Total	
Club	Season	Division	Apps	Goals	Apps	Goals	Apps	Goals	Apps	Goals	Apps	Goals
Fluminense	2015	Série A	29	1	4	0	–		12 (Note: Appearances in Campeonato Carioca)	4	45	5
Fluminense	2016	Série A	2	0	3	1	–		13 (Note: Ten appearances and two goals in Campeonato Carioca, three appearances and two goals in Primeira Liga)	2	18	3
Fluminense	Total		31	1	7	1	–		25	6	63	8
Roma	2016–17	Serie A	4	0	0	0	7 (Note: One appearance in UEFA Champions League, six appearances in UEFA Europa League)	0	–		11	0
Roma	2017–18	Serie A	24	2	1	0	6 (Note: Appearances in UEFA Champions League)	0	–		31	2
Roma	Total		28	2	1	0	13	0	–		42	2
Fiorentina (loan)	2018–19	Serie A	36	3	4	0	–		–		40	3
Flamengo	2019	Série A	27	2	–		7 (Note: Appearances in Copa Libertadores)	0	2 (Note: Appearances in FIFA Club World Cup)	0	36	2
Flamengo	2020	Série A	34	1	3	0	7	0	13 (Note: Two appearances and two goals in Recopa Sudamericana, one appearance in Supercopa do Brasil, ten appearances and one goal in Campeonato Carioca)	3	57	4
Flamengo	2021	Série A	4	0	1	0	4	0	7 (Note: One appearance in Supercopa do Brasil, six appearances and one goal in Campeonato Carioca)	1	16	1
Flamengo	Total		65	3	4	0	18	0	22	4	109	7
Marseille	2021–22	Ligue 1	35	9	3	0	10 (Note: Four appearances in UEFA Europa League, six appearances and two goals in UEFA Europa Conference League)	2	–		48	11
Marseille	2022–23	Ligue 1	10	2	0	0	3	0	–		13	2
Marseille	Total		45	11	3	0	13	2	–		61	13
Flamengo	2023	Série A	32	5	9	1	6	0	13 (Note: Ten appearances in Campeonato Carioca, one appearance in FIFA Club World Cup, one appearance in Recopa Sudamericana, one appearance in Supercopa do Brasil)	0	60	6
Flamengo	2024	Série A	32	3	10	0	8	1	6	0	56	4
Flamengo	2025	Série A	9	0	2	0	5	0	12 (Note: Eight appearances and one goal in Campeonato Carioca, one appearance in Supercopa do Brasil, three appearances and one goal in FIFA Club World Cup)	2	28	2
Flamengo	Total		73	8	21	1	19	1	31	2	144	12
Zenit Saint Petersburg	2025–26	Russian Premier League	12	1	3	1	–		–		15	2
Cruzeiro	2026	Série A	29	0	5	0	7	0	8 (Note: Appearances in Campeonato Mineiro)	0	49	0
Career total			319	29	48	3	69	3	87	12	523	47

=== International ===
As of match played 10 June 2025

Appearances and goals by national team and year
National team	Year	Apps	Goals
Brazil	2021	4	0
Brazil	2023	1	0
Brazil	2024	6	1
Brazil	2025	3	0
Total		14	1

Scores and results list Brazil's goal tally first, score column indicates score after each Gerson goal.

List of international goals scored by Gerson
No.	Date	Venue	Opponent	Score	Result	Competition
1	19 November 2024	Arena Fonte Nova, Salvador, Brazil	Uruguay	1–1	1–1	2026 FIFA World Cup qualification

== Honours ==
Fluminense

- Primeira Liga: 2016

Flamengo

- Copa Libertadores: 2019, 2025
- Recopa Sudamericana: 2020
- Campeonato Brasileiro Série A: 2019, 2020, 2025
- Supercopa do Brasil: 2020, 2021
- Copa do Brasil: 2024
- Campeonato Carioca: 2020, 2021, 2024, 2025

Zenit Saint Petersburg

- Russian Premier League: 2025–26

Cruzeiro

- Campeonato Mineiro: 2026

Individual

- Best Central Midfielder in Brazil: 2019
- Campeonato Brasileiro Série A Team of the Year: 2019, 2020, 2024
- Bola de Prata: 2019, 2020
- Copa do Brasil Team of the Season: 2024
- Campeonato Carioca Team of the Year: 2020, 2021, 2025
- Campeonato Carioca Best Player: 2025
