= Rhuan Gabriel =

Brazilian footballer (born 2006)

Personal information
- Full name: Rhuan Gabriel Rodrigues de Souza Silva
- Date of birth: 6 February 2006 (age 20)
- Place of birth: Goiânia, Brazil
- Height: 1.76 m (5 ft 9 in)
- Position: Midfielder

Team information
- Current team: Cruzeiro
- Number: 40

Youth career
- 2020–: Cruzeiro

Senior career*
| Years | Team | Apps | (Gls) |
| 2026– | Cruzeiro | 1 | (0) |

International career
| 2023 | Brazil U17 | 3 | (0) |
| 2025– | Brazil U20 | 4 | (0) |
- * Club domestic league appearances and goals as of 13:43, 23 March 2026 (UTC)

Rhuan Gabriel Rodrigues de Souza Silva (born 6 February 2006), known as Rhuan Gabriel, is a Brazilian footballer who plays as a midfielder for Cruzeiro.

== Club career ==
Born in Goiânia, Goiás, Rhuan Gabriel joined Cruzeiro's youth sides in 2020, aged 14. On 26 April 2024, he renewed his contract with the club until 2028.

On 9 September 2025, Rhuan Gabriel further extended his link with the club until December 2029. He made his first team – and Série A – debut on 18 March 2026, coming on as a late substitute for Christian in a 2–1 away loss to Athletico Paranaense.

== International career ==
Rhuan Gabriel played for the Brazil national under-17 team at the 2023 South American U-17 Championship, and also represented the under-20s at the 2025 FIFA U-20 World Cup.

== Career statistics ==
As of 23 March 2026

| Club | Season | League | | | State League | | Cup | | Continental | | Other | | Total | |
| Club | Season | Division | Apps | Goals | Apps | Goals | Apps | Goals | Apps | Goals | Apps | Goals | Apps | Goals |
|---|---|---|---|---|---|---|---|---|---|---|---|---|---|---|
| Cruzeiro | 2026 | Série A | 1 | 0 | 0 | 0 | 0 | 0 | 0 | 0 | — | | 1 | 0 |
| Career total | | | 1 | 0 | 0 | 0 | 0 | 0 | 0 | 0 | 0 | 0 | 1 | 0 |

== Honours ==
Cruzeiro U20

- Copa do Brasil Sub-20: 2023
- Copa São Paulo de Futebol Júnior: 2026

Brazil U17

- South American U-17 Championship: 2023
