= Kaio Jorge =

Brazilian footballer (born 2002)

Personal information
- Full name: Kaio Jorge Pinto Ramos
- Date of birth: 24 January 2002 (age 24)
- Place of birth: Olinda, Pernambuco, Brazil
- Height: 1.82 m (6 ft 0 in)
- Position: Striker

Team information
- Current team: Cruzeiro
- Number: 19

Youth career
- 2013–2018: Santos

Senior career*
Years	Team	Apps	(Gls)
2018–2021	Santos	60	(8)
2021–2024	Juventus	9	(0)
2021–2022	→ Juventus U23	2	(1)
2023–2024	→ Frosinone (loan)	20	(3)
2024–	Cruzeiro	84	(42)

International career^{‡}
2017	Brazil U15	3	(4)
2019	Brazil U17	11	(7)
2025–	Brazil	1	(0)
- * Club domestic league appearances and goals as of 23:53, 29 October 2026 (UTC) ‡ National team caps and goals as of 03:08, 5 September 2025 (UTC)

Kaio Jorge Pinto Ramos (born 24 January 2002), known as Kaio Jorge (Brazilian Portuguese: [ˈkaju ˈʒɔʁʒi]), is a Brazilian professional footballer who plays as a striker for Campeonato Brasileiro Série A club Cruzeiro and the Brazil national team.

== Club career ==
=== Santos ===
Born in Olinda, Pernambuco, Kaio joined Santos' under-11s in 2013. In November 2017, aged only 15, he was promoted to the under-20 squad.

On 21 September 2018, Kaio was promoted to the first-team by manager Cuca. He made his professional – and Série A – debut nine days later, coming on as a second-half substitute for Bruno Henrique in a 1–0 home defeat of Atlético Paranaense, becoming the sixth youngest to debut in Santos' history.

On 11 January 2019, after lengthy negotiations, Kaio signed his first professional contract with the club, agreeing to a three-year deal. He scored his first goal for Peixe on 3 March of the following year, netting his team's second in a 2–1 Copa Libertadores away win against Defensa y Justicia; it was also his debut match in the competition.

=== Juventus ===
On 26 July 2021, Kaio reportedly agreed to a pre-contract with Italian side Juventus, effective as of 1 January. On 2 August, Santos announced an agreement with Juventus for his immediate transfer, with the Italian side paying a rumoured fee of €3 million. Juventus officially announced Kaio's transfer on 17 August, signing him on a five-year contract.

On 23 August, Kaio suffered a medium-grade injury to the rectus femoris. On 1 September, Kaio was excluded from Juventus' 23-man squad for the UEFA Champions League group stage. He played his first match since this injury (and the first one for Juventus) on 2 October, in a 1–0 away win against cross-city rivals Torino, coming on as substitute in the 89th minute.

On 20 October, Kaio played a match with Juventus U23 — the reserve team of Juventus — in a 2–2 Serie C away draw against AlbinoLeffe, where he missed a penalty and scored a goal. In January 2022, Kaio refused a loan move to Sassuolo. On 2 February, Juventus' coach Massimiliano Allegri did not include Kaio in the UEFA Champions League knock-out stage squad. Kaio was called up by Juventus U23 again on 22 February, for a match against Pro Patria set to be played the following day, where he injured his patellar tendon. He ended the 2021–22 season early, having only played 125 minutes in nine matches with the first team (none as a starter).

==== Loan to Frosinone ====
On 29 August 2023, Kaio joined newly promoted side Frosinone on a season-long loan.

=== Cruzeiro ===
On 6 June 2024, Campeonato Brasileiro Série A club Cruzeiro announced a verbal agreement with Juventus and Kaio Jorge's staff for the transfer of the player. The deal was officially confirmed five days later after the completion of the medical exams, with Kaio Jorge signing a five-year contract with the club.

== International career ==
Kaio Jorge was called up to the Brazil U15 team for the 2017 South American U-15 Championship, scoring four goals in three matches during the tournament. On 21 September 2018, he was called up to the U17 team for a friendly tournament in Nantwich and Telford, England.

On 20 September 2019, Kaio Jorge was included in Guilherme Dalla Déa's 21-man list for the 2019 FIFA U-17 World Cup. He scored five goals in the competition, including one in a 2–1 final victory against Mexico), and was awarded the Bronze Boot.

On 25 August 2025, Kaio Jorge received his first call-up to the senior national team for the 2026 FIFA World Cup qualification. He debuted against Chile on 4 September, coming on as a substitute in the 70th minute.

== Personal life ==
Kaio's father Jorge Ramos was also a footballer and a forward who notably represented Chaves and Gama.

== Career statistics ==
=== Club ===
As of match played 29 October 2026

Appearances and goals by club, season and competition
Club	Season	League			State league (Note: Includes Campeonato Paulista, Campeonato Mineiro)		National cup (Note: Includes Copa do Brasil, Coppa Italia)		Continental		Total	
Club	Season	Division	Apps	Goals	Apps	Goals	Apps	Goals	Apps	Goals	Apps	Goals
Santos	2018	Série A	1	0	—		—		—		1	0
Santos	2019	Série A	3	0	4	0	0	0	0	0	7	0
Santos	2020	Série A	28	4	7	0	1	0	12 (Note: Appearances in Copa Libertadores)	5	48	9
Santos	2021	Série A	10	1	7	3	2	1	9 (Note: Seven appearances one goal in Copa Libertadores, two appearances two goals in Copa Sudamericana)	3	28	8
Santos	Total		42	5	18	3	3	1	21	8	84	17
Juventus U23	2021–22	Serie C	2	1	—		0	0	—		2	1
Juventus	2021–22	Serie A	9	0	—		2	0	0	0	11	0
Frosinone (loan)	2023–24	Serie A	20	3	—		2	0	—		22	3
Cruzeiro	2024	Série A	16	2	—		—		7 (Note: Appearances in Copa Sudamericana)	5	23	7
Cruzeiro	2025	Série A	33	21	2	0	8	5	3	0	46	26
Cruzeiro	2026	Série A	26	12	7	7	6	3	7	0	46	22
Cruzeiro	Total		75	35	9	7	14	8	17	5	115	55
Career total			123	44	27	10	21	9	38	13	209	76

== Honours ==
Santos

- Campeonato Brasileiro Série A runner-up: 2019
- Copa Libertadores runner-up: 2020

Juventus

- Supercoppa Italiana runner-up: 2021
- Coppa Italia runner-up: 2021–22

Cruzeiro

- Campeonato Mineiro: 2026
- Copa Sudamericana runner-up: 2024

Brazil U15

- South American U-15 Championship: runner-up: 2017

Brazil U17

- FIFA U-17 World Cup: 2019

Individual

- FIFA U-17 World Cup Bronze Boot: 2019
- Campeonato Brasileiro Série A Player of the Month: May 2025
- Troféu Mesa Redonda Team of the Year: 2025
- Bola de Prata: 2025
- Campeonato Brasileiro Série A Team of the Year: 2025
- Campeonato Brasileiro Série A top scorer: 2025 (21 goals)
- Copa do Brasil top scorer: 2025 (5 goals)
- Campeonato Mineiro top scorer: 2026 (7 goals)
