= Kauã Moraes =

Brazilian footballer (born 2006)

Personal information
- Full name: Kauã Moraes Silva
- Date of birth: 29 September 2006 (age 20)
- Place of birth: São Paulo, Brazil
- Height: 1.74 m (5 ft 9 in)
- Position: Right-back

Team information
- Current team: Cruzeiro
- Number: 2

Youth career
- 2016–2025: Palmeiras
- 2025: Athletico Paranaense

Senior career*
Years	Team	Apps	(Gls)
2025	Athletico Paranaense	14	(1)
2025–	Cruzeiro	13	(2)
- * Club domestic league appearances and goals as of 9 April 2026

Kauã Moraes Silva (born 29 September 2006) is a Brazilian footballer who plays as a right-back for Cruzeiro.

== Career ==
Born in São Paulo, Kauã Moraes joined Palmeiras' youth sides at the age of ten, and signed his first professional contract with the club on 14 July 2023. In March 2025, however, he joined Athletico Paranaense and was initially assigned to the under-20 team.

Kauã Moraes made his professional debut on 17 May 2025, coming on as a second-half substitute for Raul in a 2–1 Série B away loss to Vila Nova. Three days later, he scored his first goal in a 1–0 home win over Brusque, for the year's Copa do Brasil; it was also his first senior start.

On 2 September 2025, Kauã Moraes was announced at Cruzeiro on a five-year contract, after the club activated his R$ 10 million release clause.

== Career statistics ==
As of 16 September 2025

Club	Season	League			State League		Cup		Continental		Other		Total	
Club	Season	Division	Apps	Goals	Apps	Goals	Apps	Goals	Apps	Goals	Apps	Goals	Apps	Goals
Athletico Paranaense	2025	Série B	14	1	—		2	1	—		—		16	2
Cruzeiro	2025	Série A	0	0	—		—		—		—		0	0
Career total			14	1	0	0	2	1	0	0	0	0	16	2
