= Jonathan Jesus =

Brazilian footballer (born 2004)

Personal information
- Full name: Jonathan de Jesus Alves
- Date of birth: 27 May 2004 (age 22)
- Place of birth: São Vicente, Brazil
- Height: 1.87 m (6 ft 2 in)
- Position: Centre-back

Team information
- Current team: Cruzeiro
- Number: 34

Youth career
- 2021–2024: Ceará

Senior career*
Years	Team	Apps	(Gls)
2023–2024	Ceará	9	(0)
2024–	Cruzeiro	54	(0)

International career^{‡}
2026–	Brazil	2	(0)
- * Club domestic league appearances and goals as of 22:28, 29 October 2026 (UTC) ‡ National team caps and goals as of 15:15, 14 November 2026 (UTC)

Jonathan de Jesus Alves (born 27 May 2004), known as Jonathan Jesus or just Jonathan, is a Brazilian professional footballer who plays as a centre-back for Cruzeiro and the Brazil national team.

== Career ==
=== Ceará ===
Born in São Vicente, São Paulo, Jonathan joined Ceará's youth sides in 2021 for a trial period, after being indicated by his uncle. After progressing through the youth setup, he made his first team debut on 8 June 2023, coming on as a late substitute for Zé Ricardo in a 3–0 Série B away win over Atlético Goianiense.

After being mainly a member of the under-20 squad, Jonathan was definitely promoted to the first team after the 2024 Copa São Paulo de Futebol Júnior, and became a regular starter in the first rounds of the 2024 Série B.

=== Cruzeiro ===
On 14 June 2024, Ceará announced the transfer of Jonathan to Série A side Cruzeiro, after the club paid a R$ 8.25 million fee for 90% of his economic rights. He made his club – and top tier – debut on 22 September, starting in a 0–0 away draw against Cuiabá.

A backup option under head coach Leonardo Jardim during the 2025 season, Jonathan received offers from Zenit Saint Petersburg which were refused by Cruzeiro in December of that year. He started the 2026 campaign as a first-choice under new head coach Tite, but a knee injury which left him sidelined for a month only let him recover his starting spot in April, now under head coach Artur Jorge.

== International career ==
On 29 October 2026, Jonathan was called up to the Brazil national team by Carlo Ancelotti for two friendlies against Japan and Singapore. He make his international debut on 14 November against Japan.

== Personal life ==
Jonathan's uncle Heleno was also a footballer. A defensive midfielder, he too represented Ceará.

== Career statistics ==
As of 29 October 2026

Appearances and goals by club, season and competition
Club	Season	League			State League		National Cup		Continental		Other		Total	
Club	Season	Division	Apps	Goals	Apps	Goals	Apps	Goals	Apps	Goals	Apps	Goals	Apps	Goals
Ceará	2023	Série B	2	0	—		0	0	—		—		2	0
Ceará	2024	Série B	6	0	1	0	1	0	—		5 (Note: Appearance(s) in Copa do Nordeste)	0	13	0
Ceará	Total		8	0	1	0	1	0	—		5	0	15	0
Cruzeiro	2024	Série A	5	0	—		—		0	0	—		5	0
Cruzeiro	2025	Série A	13	0	9	0	4	1	5 (Note: Appearance(s) in Copa Sudamericana)	0	—		31	1
Cruzeiro	2026	Série A	21	0	6	0	5	1	7 (Note: Appearance(s) in Copa Libertadores)	0	—		39	1
Cruzeiro	Total		39	0	15	0	9	1	12	0	—		75	2
Career total			47	0	16	0	10	1	12	0	5	0	95	2
