= Lucas Villalba =

Argentine footballer

Personal information
- Full name: Lucas Hernán Villalba
- Date of birth: 19 August 1994 (age 32)
- Place of birth: Florencio Varela, Argentina
- Positions: Centre-back; left-back

Team information
- Current team: Cruzeiro
- Number: 25

Youth career
- 2009–2012: Independiente

Senior career*
| Years | Team | Apps | (Gls) |
| 2012–2019 | Independiente | 44 | (0) |
| 2016 | → Tucumán (loan) | 22 | (0) |
| 2017–2018 | → Huracán (loan) | 29 | (0) |
| 2018–2019 | → Aldosivi (loan) | 23 | (1) |
| 2019–2021 | Aldosivi | 31 | (0) |
| 2022–2024 | Argentinos Juniors | 108 | (4) |
| 2024 | → Cruzeiro (loan) | 28 | (0) |
| 2025– | Cruzeiro | 36 | (1) |

International career
| 2012 | Argentina U20 | | |
- * Club domestic league appearances and goals as of 13 December 2025

Lucas Hernán Villalba (born 19 August 1994) is an Argentine professional footballer who plays as either a centre-back or a left-back for Campeonato Brasileiro Série A side Cruzeiro

== Career ==
=== Club ===
Villalba started his career with Independiente, making his debut in the 2012–13 Argentine Primera División season against Godoy Cruz. He then moved to Atlético Tucumán in 2016 on loan and subsequently played 22 times in the Argentine Primera División. On 10 January 2017, Villalba joined fellow Primera División side Huracán on loan.

In Feb, 2024 he signed a loan with Cruzeiro Esporte Clube. After playing 35 matches for the Brazilian side in 2024, Cruzeiro announced on 3 January 2025 that the team signed Villalba permanently, offering a two-year contract.

=== Cruzeiro ===
Lucas Martín Villalba was announced as a player for Cruzeiro Esporte Clube in February 2024. The Argentine defender joined the club on loan from Argentinos Juniors, with a contract until the end of the 2024 season and a purchase option included at the end of the loan.

His signing addressed a squad need for a left-footed defender capable of playing both as a centre-back and as a left-back. Villalba made his debut and accumulated appearances under manager Nicolás Larcamón and, subsequently, continued to be utilized by manager Fernando Seabra.

As of May 2024, Villalba has participated in matches for the Campeonato Mineiro, Copa do Brasil, Campeonato Brasileiro, and Copa Sudamericana, playing predominantly as a centre-back and, occasionally, as a left-back.

Lucas Martín Villalba gained more prominence following the arrival of head coach Leonardo Jardim, improving the performance metrics for his position.

After João Marcelo's injury, he took over as a starting center-back alongside Fabrício Bruno for Leonardo Jardim's team, leading Cruzeiro to a commanding lead in the Brasileirão. He scored his first goal for Cruzeiro in a 4–1 rout of Grêmio at Mineirão Stadium on July 13th.

Lucas Villalba was one of the heroes of Cruzeiro's qualification for the quarterfinals of the 2025 Copa do Brasil. He scored the first goal of the match against CRB at Rei Pelé Stadium. Following a corner kick from Matheus Pereira, he headed the ball into the net.

=== Argentina national team ===
Villalba has won caps for Argentina at U20 level.

== Career statistics ==
=== Club ===
As of 10 March 2017.

Club statistics
| Club | Season | League | | | Cup (Note: Includes the Copa Argentina.) | | League Cup | | Continental (Note: Includes the Copa Sudamericana.) | | Other | | Total | |
| Club | Season | Division | Apps | Goals | Apps | Goals | Apps | Goals | Apps | Goals | Apps | Goals | Apps | Goals |
|---|---|---|---|---|---|---|---|---|---|---|---|---|---|---|
| Independiente | 2012–13 | Primera División | 7 | 0 | 1 | 0 | — | | 0 | 0 | 0 | 0 | 8 | 0 |
| Independiente | 2013–14 | Primera B Nacional | 22 | 0 | 0 | 0 | — | | — | | 0 | 0 | 22 | 0 |
| Independiente | 2014 | Primera División | 15 | 0 | 2 | 0 | — | | — | | 0 | 0 | 17 | 0 |
| Independiente | 2015 | Primera División | 0 | 0 | 1 | 0 | — | | 0 | 0 | 0 | 0 | 1 | 0 |
| Independiente | 2016 | Primera División | 0 | 0 | 0 | 0 | — | | — | | 0 | 0 | 0 | 0 |
| Independiente | 2016–17 | Primera División | 0 | 0 | 0 | 0 | — | | 0 | 0 | 0 | 0 | 0 | 0 |
| Independiente | Total | | 44 | 0 | 4 | 0 | — | | 0 | 0 | 0 | 0 | 48 | 0 |
| Atlético Tucumán (loan) | 2016 | Primera División | 12 | 0 | 0 | 0 | — | | — | | 0 | 0 | 12 | 0 |
| Atlético Tucumán (loan) | 2016–17 | Primera División | 10 | 0 | 1 | 0 | — | | 0 | 0 | 0 | 0 | 11 | 0 |
| Atlético Tucumán (loan) | Total | | 22 | 0 | 1 | 0 | — | | 0 | 0 | 0 | 0 | 23 | 0 |
| Huracán (loan) | 2016–17 | Primera División | 0 | 0 | 0 | 0 | — | | 1 (Note: One appearance in 2017 Copa Sudamericana) | 0 | 0 | 0 | 1 | 0 |
| Career total | | | 66 | 0 | 5 | 0 | — | | 1 | 0 | 0 | 0 | 72 | 0 |
