= Tite (football manager) =

Brazilian football manager (born 1961)

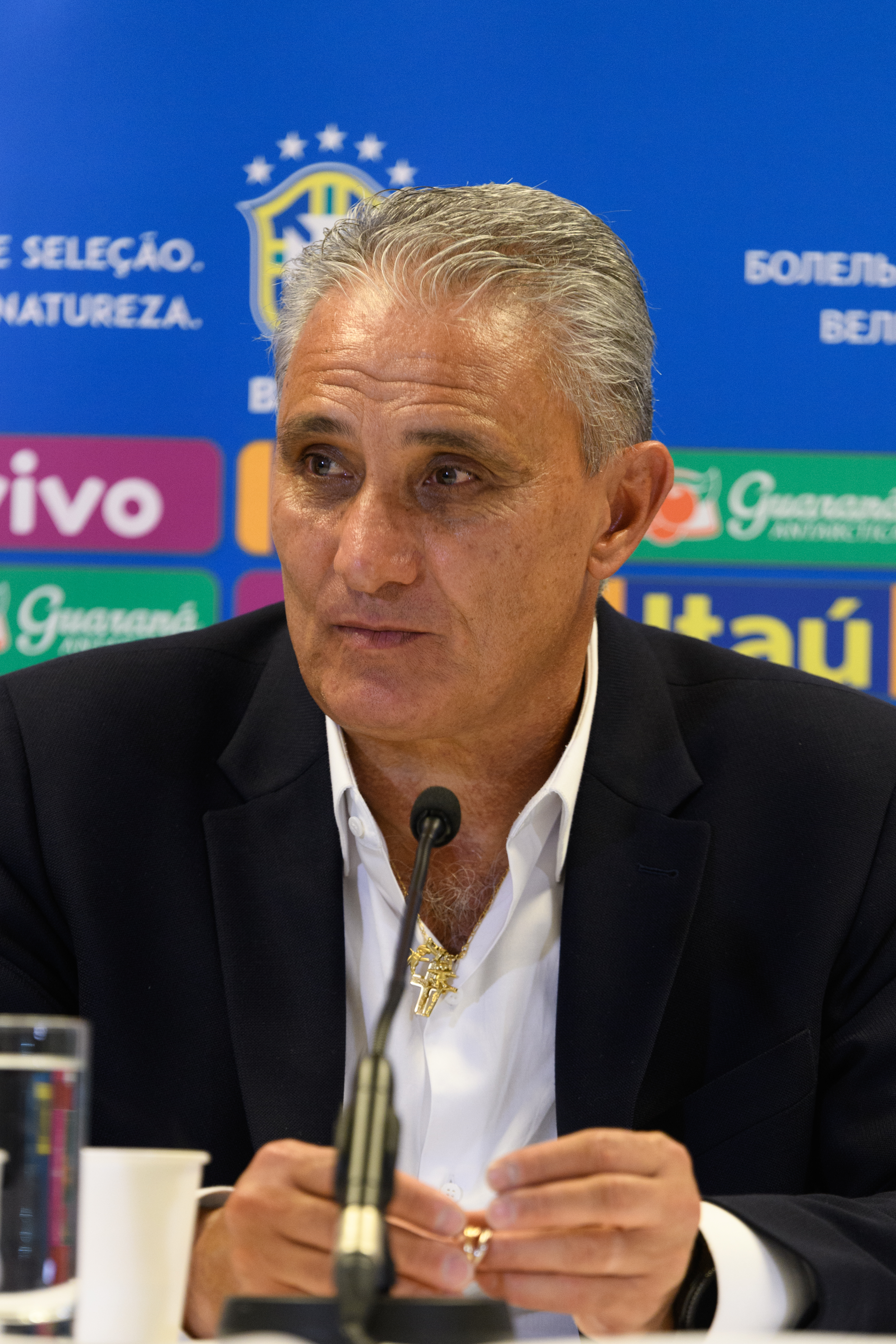
- Tite as Brazil head coach in 2018

Personal information
- Full name: Adenor Leonardo Bacchi
- Date of birth: 25 May 1961 (age 65)
- Place of birth: Caxias do Sul, Brazil
- Height: 1.80 m (5 ft 11 in)
- Position: Midfielder

Team information
- Current team: Botafogo (head coach)

Youth career
- EC Juvenil
- 1978–1979: Caxias

Senior career*
Years	Team	Apps	(Gls)
1979–1983	Caxias	?	(4)
1983–1984	Esportivo		
1984	→ Portuguesa (loan)	22	(6)
1984–1988	Guarani FC	36	(1)
1989	Esportivo		
1990	Guarany de Garibaldi		

Managerial career
- 1990–1991: Guarany de Garibaldi
- 1991–1992: Caxias
- 1992–1995: Veranópolis
- 1996: Ypiranga-RS
- 1997: Juventude
- 1998: Caxias
- 1998: Veranópolis
- 1999–2000: Caxias
- 2001–2003: Grêmio
- 2003–2004: São Caetano
- 2004–2005: Corinthians
- 2005: Atlético Mineiro
- 2006: Palmeiras
- 2007: Al Ain
- 2008–2009: Internacional
- 2010: Al Wahda
- 2010–2013: Corinthians
- 2015–2016: Corinthians
- 2016–2022: Brazil
- 2023–2024: Flamengo
- 2026: Cruzeiro
- 2026–: Botafogo
Medal record
Men's football
Representing Brazil (as manager)
Copa América
Winner	Brazil 2019
Runner-up	Brazil 2021
- * Club domestic league appearances and goals

Adenor Leonardo Bacchi (born 25 May 1961), commonly known as Tite (Brazilian Portuguese: [ˈtʃitʃ(i)]), is a Brazilian professional football coach and former player who played as a midfielder. He is the current head coach of Botafogo.

Tite played from 1978 to 1984 for Caxias, then a season for Esportivo de Bento Gonçalves and a season for Portuguesa. The three following seasons from 1986 to 1989 at Guarani were his most successful as player. At age 27, he ended his career due to successive knee injuries that caused him to lose mobility in one of his knees.

In 1990, Tite began coaching, leading Caxias to the 2000 Campeonato Gaúcho defeating Grêmio before moving to that club, with whom he won the same tournament and the Copa do Brasil in 2001. He stayed until 2003 when Tite trained other teams: São Caetano, Corinthians in 2004, Atlético Mineiro in 2005, Palmeiras in 2006, and Al Ain of the United Arab Emirates in 2007. From 2008 to 2009 he trained Internacional and they won the 2008 Copa Sudamericana and the 2009 Campeonato Gaúcho. At the end of 2010 he was announced as a coach of Al Wahda of the United Arab Emirates, but he left the club months later to return to Corinthians.

For Corinthians, Tite won the 2011 Campeonato Brasileiro Série A title, the 2012 Copa Libertadores title, the 2012 FIFA Club World Cup title against Chelsea, the 2013 Campeonato Paulista and the 2013 Recopa Sudamericana. On 14 November 2013, Tite announced that he was leaving the club. After a sabbatical period, Tite returned to Corinthians in 2015, where they won the 2015 Campeonato Brasileiro Série A. He was manager of the Brazil national team from 2016 to 2022, winning the 2019 Copa América and reaching the quarter-finals of the World Cup in 2018 and 2022. He won the Campeonato Carioca with Flamengo in 2024 and the Campeonato Mineiro with Cruzeiro in 2026, thereby matching Telê Santana's feat of winning Brazil's four most important state leagues.

== Early life ==
Born in Caxias do Sul, Rio Grande do Sul, to Genor and Ivone Bacchi, Adenor was the middle child, having a younger brother named Ademir and an elder sister named Beatriz. He was nicknamed "Ade" by his friends and family during his childhood. His father was also an amateur player and took him to Esporte Clube Juvenil (an amateur side in São Braz, a small community in his hometown), where both would play together in the reserve side.

After spending a short period at Juventude's youth sides, Ade left after having to find work. However, when playing for his school Colégio Henrique Emilio Meier in a local tournament, he was spotted by Luiz Felipe Scolari, who took him to the youth categories of Caxias. When presented by Felipão at Caxias, he was mistakenly called "Tite" (the name of another midfielder from the college team), but the nickname later remained.

== Playing career ==
After joining the youth sides of Caxias in 1978, Tite quickly started to feature for the under-20 side, and made his senior debut on 19 September 1979, in a 0–0 home draw against rivals Juventude. He would later establish himself as a regular starter for the side, and was transferred to Esportivo de Bento Gonçalves in 1983.

In 1984, Tite agreed to a six-month loan deal with Portuguesa, newly promoted to the Série A. There, he would score on a regular basis, netting six goals in just 22 appearances, but was not bought outright after a change of presidency at the club.

After not having his rights purchased by Lusa, Tite would move to Guarani also in 1984, but suffered a serious knee injury in his second match at the club, being sidelined for the remainder of the year. Back to action in 1985, he again suffered another knee injury and only managed to feature regularly in 1986. Marred by injuries and after undergoing seven surgeries, his period at the club ended in 1988, with just 40 matches and one goal.

In 1989, Tite returned to Esportivo in an attempt to overcome his injuries. However, he suffered another knee injury at the club, and had another lengthy recovery. After leaving Esportivo, Tite opened a sports shop in Bento Gonçalves, but was invited to play for Guarany de Garibaldi in the 1990 Campeonato Gaúcho Segunda Divisão; knowing his physical limitations, he accepted the offer but also became the club's fitness coach, to help them reduce costs.

== Coaching career ==
=== Early career ===
Midway through the 1990 Segundona, Guarany's manager Celso Freitas left the club, and Tite was appointed manager on his place. In 1991, after narrowly missing out promotion with Guarany, he was named in charge of Caxias, but left the club in 1992.

Tite joined Veranópolis in 1992, shortly after leaving Caxias, and led the side to a title in the 1993 Campeonato Gaúcho Segunda Divisão. On 3 January 1996, he was presented as manager of Ypiranga de Erechim, but was dismissed on 22 April after eleven matches.

Tite was in charge of Juventude for a brief period during the 1997 season, but was sacked during the year's Campeonato Gaúcho and replaced by Gílson Nunes. In 1998, he had short stints at Caxias and Veranópolis, and also worked as a sports commentator in the Rádio Gaúcha.

=== Early success ===
==== Caxias ====
In 1999, Tite was hired by Caxias, his first club as a professional footballer, leading the team through a surprising campaign in the 2000 Campeonato Gaúcho. Caxias were the champions of the Rio Grande do Sul state tournament, defeating Ronaldinho's Grêmio, winning the first match at the finals by 3–0 and drawing the second one with no goals. Tite's success on the Gauchão drew the attention of the Rio Grande do Sul press, as the Campeonato Gaúcho is rarely claimed by any team other than the "big two", Grêmio and Internacional.

==== Grêmio ====
Signed by Grêmio in 2001, Tite led the Porto Alegre squad to another Gauchão title, defeating Juventude in the finals, winning by 3–2 and 3–1 and claiming the 2001 Campeonato Gaúcho for Grêmio.

In the same year, Grêmio won the 2001 Copa do Brasil under Tite's command, knocking out a respectable selection of teams throughout the brackets, such as Villa Nova on the first stage, Santa Cruz on the second, Fluminense on the round of 16, São Paulo on the quarter-finals, and Coritiba on the semifinals. Facing Corinthians on the finals, Tite's Grêmio drew the first leg of the finals at their home stadium, Estádio Olímpico Monumental, by 2–2. In front of a capacity crowd at Estádio do Morumbi, Grêmio defeated Marcelinho Carioca and Müller's Corinthians 3–1, claiming what would be Tite's first national title.

Tite would remain with the Tricolor Gaúcho until 2003, leaving the club after failing to lead the club to any substantial victory after the 2001 Copa do Brasil. Grêmio reached the third place at both the 2002 Campeonato Brasileiro Série A and the 2002 Copa Libertadores, but led Grêmio to a lackluster campaign during the year of 2003, which led to his departure from the club, exacerbated by his long spell as coach.

=== Leaving Rio Grande do Sul; Spells in São Paulo, Minas Gerais, and foreign clubs ===
Tite was hired by São Caetano do Sul club Associação Desportiva São Caetano in 2003, with the goal of taking the azulão to the Copa Libertadores qualifying zone. Leading the team to a good campaign, São Caetano reached the fourth place in the league table, qualifying itself to the 2004 Copa Libertadores, being routed at the quarter-finals by Boca Juniors, after drawing both games and losing on penalty kicks. Tite, however, had been fired by the club and replaced with Muricy Ramalho before the 2004 Campeonato Paulista.

Tite also coached Corinthians (2004–2005), Atlético Mineiro (2005), Palmeiras (2006), and Al Ain (2007).

=== Internacional ===
Tite was signed in 2008 to Internacional, despite the protests of the colorado supporters, who resented the presence of the former coach of their rivals, Grêmio, as the club manager.

Since then, Tite led the club to a sixth-place finish in the 2008 Campeonato Brasileiro Série A, and won the 2008 Copa Sudamericana over Argentine club Estudiantes de La Plata, eliminating important Latin American clubs such as Universidad Católica, Boca Juniors and Chivas Guadalajara along the way.

Under Tite's command, Internacional also won the 2009 Campeonato Gaúcho over Grêmio and reached the 2009 Copa do Brasil finals, losing against Corinthians but knocking clubs such as Flamengo and Coritiba out of the competition. Internacional were the runners-up of the 2009 Recopa Sudamericana, losing against LDU Quito in the finals. In the same year, Internacional won the 2009 Suruga Bank Championship, defeating Japanese club Oita Trinita.

In the 2009 season, Internacional had a very good first half of the season, however its results greatly diminished during the second half, both in and out of the Beira-Rio stadium. Tite was then fired by the directors of the club on 5 October.

=== Brief stay at Al-Wahda and return to Corinthians ===
Tite was signed by Emirati side Al Wahda. Tite's stay was brief, as he was approached by his former club, Corinthians, to replace coach Adilson Batista, who had left the team.

==== Campeonato Brasileiro 2010 ====
Tite returned to Corinthians in a complicated moment, as the club's battle for the 2010 Campeonato Brasileiro Série A title had been derailed by a 10-game dry spell, which caused the sacking of previous coach Adilson Batista with eight matches still to be played in the season. In spite of not winning the tournament, losing the title at the final round of the season after a draw against Goiás from Goiânia, Corinthians had a solid campaign under Tite, remaining unbeaten through the final matches of the season, and finishing at a respectable third place, earning a berth at the 2011 Copa Libertadores first stage and cementing Tite's position.

==== Defeat in the Libertadores Cup ====
After an uneventful debut at the 2011 Campeonato Paulista, defeating Portuguesa 2–0, the Corinthians squad prepared itself for its matches against Deportes Tolima for the preliminary stage of the Copa Libertadores. Drawing 0–0 at the Estádio do Pacaembu, Tite's squad raised suspicions with the fans and the press, as the preliminary stage of the continental competition was widely seen in Brazil as a preamble to the real competition, not being a proper part of it. With the moral obligation of winning the away leg of the match in Estadio Manuel Murillo Toro at Ibagué, Colombia, Corinthians was under intense scrutiny of their supporters and detractors. Playing poorly against the Colombian squad, barely finishing or generating goal scoring opportunities, Tolima defeated Corinthians 2–0, inciting fury among supporters, the mockery of rival fans, and a crisis in the São Paulo team, as Corinthians was the first Brazilian team not to advance in the "Pré-Libertadores", as the preliminary stage of the cup is known. Despite the wide demand of the fans to fire him, club president Andrés Sánchez reinforced the fact that Tite was still the coach.

Days later, 1994 and 2002 FIFA World Cup champion, all-time lead scorer at World Cup finals and two-time Ballon d'Or winner Ronaldo was criticized for his poor performance, physical shape and lack of playing time for Corinthians throughout his spell with the team, announced his retirement from the sport. Fellow 2002 world cup champion Roberto Carlos departed the club for Russian club Anzhi Makhachkala alongside Jucilei, while Bruno César left for Benfica. The team, already without Elias and soon to be without Dentinho, who would leave the club for Shakhtar Donetsk, needed an overhaul. Tite enlisted the help of Portuguese international – and native Brazilian – Liédson, who returned to Brazil to join Corinthians.

==== 2011 Campeonato Paulista ====
Soon after its Libertadores defeat, Corinthians had to face their rivals, Palmeiras, on the Campeonato Paulista. With Tite's job on the line, Corinthians won the derby by 1 goal to 0. Picking up important victories on the competition, Corinthians had qualified to the final stage of the Paulistão, defeating Oeste in the quarter-finals, Palmeiras in the semi-finals, and drawing against Santos on the first leg of the finals. Santos, however, won 2–1 in the second leg of the final match, winning their second state title in a row.

==== 2011 Campeonato Brasileiro ====
Off to an impressive start on the Brasileirão with a ten-game undefeated streak, Corinthians spent most of the first half of the 2011 season as the leader of the competition, in spite of moments of instability, such as its defeats against Avaí and rivals Palmeiras, coupled with draws against lower table clubs such as Ceará.

In the penultimate match of the competition, Corinthians needed a win against Figueirense and it needed Vasco da Gama to draw against Fluminense in order to become champions of the 2011 season. Routing the Florianópolis team with ease, Coringão was virtually the champion, as Vasco drew against Fluminense during the Rio de Janeiro derby. In the final minute of the match, however, Vasco scored, interrupting the celebrations of the São Paulo club, pushing the championship definition to the next and final round, on the coming Sunday.

Leading the league tables by the final round, Corinthians had 70 points and a higher win ratio, while Vasco had 68 points. Needing only a draw against bitter rivals Palmeiras to be consecrated as champions, Corinthians was in a better position than Vasco, who needed to defeat Flamengo and for Corinthians to lose against Palmeiras. Vasco did not manage to defeat Rio rivals Flamengo, and Corinthians drew against Palmeiras in a tense game, winning the Campeonato Brasileiro. This was Tite's first Campeonato Brasileiro title, and his second national title.

Tite was praised by the press for his persistence and his important tactical changes during the matches, and for promoting two important overhauls in the club, the first after the Libertadores defeat, and the second after the Paulistão finals loss.

==== 2012 Copa Libertadores ====
After a turbulent elimination in the 2012 Campeonato Paulista, in which Corinthians were eliminated in the playoffs by Ponte Preta, Tite managed the club to their first ever Libertadores title in an unbeaten campaign, defeating Boca Juniors in the finals.

==== 2012 FIFA Club World Cup ====
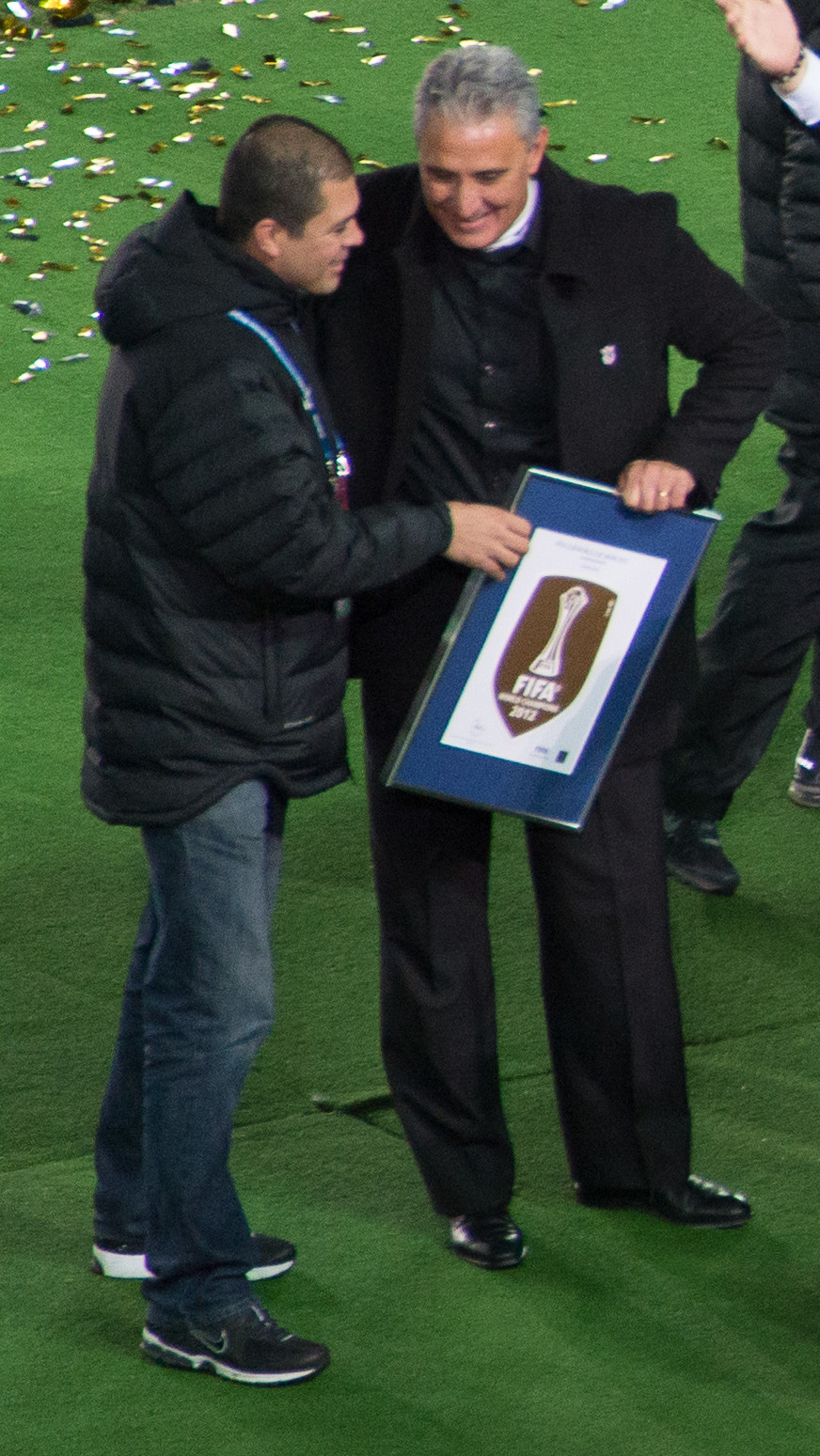
Tite in 2012

Entering the 2012 FIFA Club World Cup as the reigning South American champions, Corinthians earned a berth in the semi-finals against Egyptian club Al Ahly, the reigning 2012 CAF Champions League champions. Edging the Africans 1–0, Tite's defensive, possession-based tactics were called into question, especially after the tense second half of the game which saw the Egyptians create many goalscoring chances.

Advancing to the final, Corinthians were to face the champions of Europe, Chelsea. The two teams were in deeply different stages of morale and form – Chelsea interim manager Rafael Benítez was being heavily contested by the supporters; the captain of the team, John Terry, was out due to injury; and the team's main striker, 2010 World Cup winner Fernando Torres, was in poor form. Tite's squad lacked individual quality and talent, but was fine-tuned tactically and enjoyed a heavy boost of morale. The match saw the young goalkeeper Cássio save many dangerous shots, and Corinthians won after striker Paolo Guerrero scored a header against Petr Čech, winning Corinthians its second World Club Cup title, as well as Tite's first.

==== 2013 and leaving Corinthians ====
Despite winning State of São Paulo League and Recopa Sudamericana, 2013 was not a good year for Corinthians. The club was eliminated in Copa Libertadores, where they unsuccessfully tried to defend their title, had a poor campaign at the Brazilian League and also lost Brazilian Cup after a penalty was missed by Alexandre Pato, arguably the main signing of that season.

Although supported by most Corinthians fans, Tite announced that his contract with the club would not be renewed on 14 November. Mano Menezes (former Brazil national team head coach and Corithians president Mario Gobbi's friend) return as Alvinegro's coach.

=== Sabbatical year ===
After leaving Corinthians, Tite decided to focus on studying modern football. He received offers, but declined them in favour of his studies. He watched several games (including games from the 2014 World Cup) and visited some clubs as part of that refinement, including Arsenal and Carlo Ancelotti's Real Madrid. He was expected to be appointed as Brazil's new coach and was even approached by Japan, but Dunga was selected as Brazil's coach and Tite did not go through negotiations with Japan.

=== Third stint at Corinthians ===
On 15 December 2014, Tite's return as manager of Corinthians was announced. He won the 2015 Campeonato Brasileiro Série A, leading the club to the best campaign in the tournament's history at that time. (currently 3rd best all-time, after Flamengo in 2019 and Atlético Mineiro in 2021).

=== Brazil national team ===
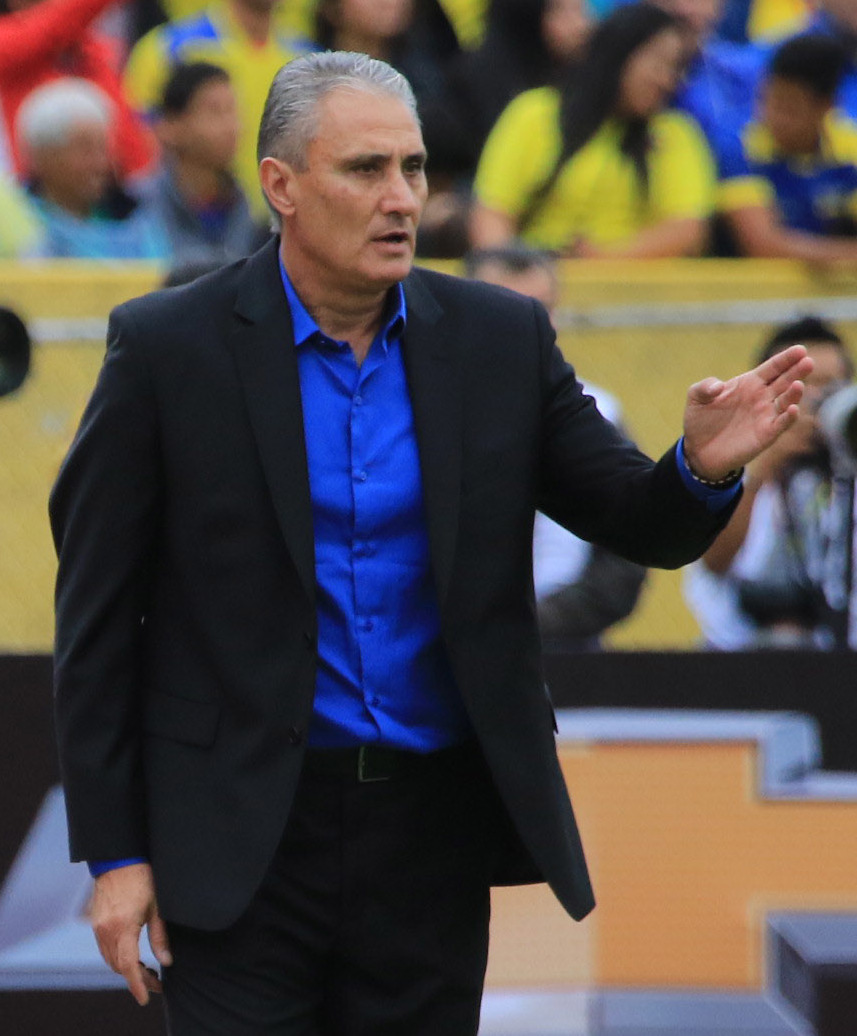
Tite managing Brazil in 2016

In June 2016, Tite was announced as the new coach for the Brazil national team to replace Dunga, who was fired following Brazil's poor performance at Copa América Centenario. In his first match in charge of Brazil, a 2018 World Cup qualifying match against Ecuador on 1 September, Brazil won 3–0, with goals from Neymar and Gabriel Jesus. He then led his team to seven consecutive victories in qualifying matches, eventually securing a spot at the World Cup in Russia, making them the first team to qualify for the tournament, apart from the hosts. He took his side to the quarter-finals, losing 2–1 to Belgium.

Tite is noted for not having a preferred captain - as of May 2018, he had named 15 different captains in 19 matches. As of May 2019, he had used a total of 16 in 21 matches, with Neymar being the most common one with a total of seven matches. In August 2018, Tite decided to have Neymar as the fixed captain as an opportunity for him to demonstrate maturity following his behavior at the 2018 FIFA World Cup. In May 2019, however, he handed the armband to Dani Alves following Neymar's incident with a spectator at the 2019 Coup de France final.

On 25 July 2018, Tite signed a new contract until the end of the 2022 World Cup. He won the 2019 Copa América on home soil; this was Brazil's 9th Copa America title, their first Copa America in 12 years, and their first trophy in 6 years. Brazil hosted the 2021 Copa América due to political issues in Colombia and the COVID-19 pandemic in Argentina, and lost the final by a single goal to Argentina; Tite criticised CONMEBOL and its president Alejandro Domínguez for moving the event with two weeks' notice and was fined US$5,000.

In February 2022, Tite revealed that he intended to step down as manager of Brazil after the 2022 FIFA World Cup. On 9 December 2022, Tite confirmed that he would leave the team, following their elimination from the quarter-finals of the World Cup against Croatia on penalties.

=== Flamengo ===
On 9 October 2023, Tite was announced as new head coach of Flamengo, signing a contract until December 2024. His debut the following 17 January was a 4–0 win over Audax Rio in the opening game of the Campeonato Carioca, using a full-strength line-up at the Arena da Amazônia. After finishing first in the regular season, his team eliminated rivals Fluminense in the semi-finals, and Nova Iguaçu 4–0 on aggregate in the final; he invited the losing finalists onto the winners' podium and gave his medal to their manager, Carlos Vitor. He was dismissed from the club on 30 September 2024, after being knocked out of the 2024 Copa Libertadores by Peñarol.

=== Cruzeiro ===
On 16 December 2025, Tite was announced as new head coach of Cruzeiro to replace Leonardo Jardim, signing a contract until the end of 2026. He had managed their rivals Atlético Mineiro 21 years earlier. Despite losing the season opener 2–1 at home to Pouso Alegre on 10 January, he won the 2026 Campeonato Mineiro, defeating Atlético 1–0 in the final; he equalled Telê Santana's achievement of winning a state championship in Rio de Janeiro, São Paulo, Rio Grande do Sul and Minas Gerais. He was sacked on 15 March of that year, after a series of poor performances and six winless matches in the league.

=== Botafogo ===
On 16 September 2026, Tite was announced as head coach of Botafogo, agreeing to a contract until the end of 2028.

== Personal life ==
Tite is married to Rosmari and has a daughter and son Matheus Bachi, who played NCAA Division II soccer at Carson–Newman University. Tite is a practising Roman Catholic.

As a youth, he studied physical education under Luiz Felipe Scolari at school. Like Scolari, Bacchi family immigrated from Italy. Scolari went on to be his mentor and then rival as a coach. He went on to graduate in physical education at the Pontifícia Universidade Católica de Campinas.

== Career statistics ==
Appearances and goals by club, season and competition
Club	Season	League			State League		Cup		Continental		Other		Total	
Club	Season	Division	Apps	Goals	Apps	Goals	Apps	Goals	Apps	Goals	Apps	Goals	Apps	Goals
Caxias	1979	Série A	1	0	?	0	—		—		—		1+	0
Caxias	1980	Série B	?	0	27	2	—		—		—		27+	2
Caxias	1981	Gaúcho	—		20	2	—		—		? (Note: Appearance(s) in Torneio Seletivo para a Taça de Bronze)	1	20+	3
Caxias	1982	Gaúcho	—		?	0	—		—		8 (Note: Seven appearances in Torneio Incentivo, one appearance in Copa Estado do Rio Grande do Sul)	0	8+	0
Caxias	1983	Gaúcho	—		?	0	—		—		1 (Note: Appearance(s) in Torneio Incentivo)	0	1+	0
Caxias	Total		1+	0	47+	4	—		—		9+	1	57+	5
Esportivo	1983	Série B	?	?	?	?	—		—		1	0	?	?
Portuguesa (loan)	1984	Série A	18	5	4	1	—		—		—		22	6
Guarani	1984	Série B	0	0	2	0	—		—		—		2	0
Guarani	1985	Série A	0	0	2	0	—		—		—		2	0
Guarani	1986	Série A	15	1	4	0	—		—		—		19	1
Guarani	1987	Série A	2	0	11	0	—		3 (Note: Appearance(s) in Copa Libertadores)	0	—		16	0
Guarani	1988	Série A	0	0	0	0	—		1	0	—		1	0
Guarani	Total		17	1	19	0	—		4	0	—		40	1
Esportivo	1989	Série B	?	?	16	3	—		—		—		16+	3+
Career total			36+	6+	86+	8+	0	0	4	0	10+	1	136+	15+

== Managerial statistics ==
As of 18 November 2026

Managerial record by team and tenure
Team	Nat	From	To	Record								Ref.
Team	Nat	From	To	G	W	D	L	GF	GA	GD	Win %	Ref.
Guarany de Garibaldi	(Brazil)	15 April 1990	11 August 1991	14	7	6	1	22	12	+10	50.00	
Caxias	(Brazil)	11 August 1991	1 January 1992	19	4	8	7	17	24	−7	21.05	
Veranópolis	(Brazil)	15 January 1992	30 December 1995	125	45	42	38	134	116	+18	36.00	
Ypiranga-RS	(Brazil)	3 January 1996	22 April 1996	11	3	5	3	11	9	+2	27.27	
Juventude	(Brazil)	15 December 1996	20 May 1997	21	10	5	6	34	25	+9	47.62	
Caxias	(Brazil)	10 January 1998	5 April 1998	10	3	5	2	10	9	+1	30.00	
Veranópolis	(Brazil)	7 April 1998	10 December 1998	10	5	3	2	16	12	+4	50.00	
Caxias	(Brazil)	1 May 1999	31 December 2000	97	42	30	25	144	111	+33	43.30	
Grêmio	(Brazil)	27 December 2000	3 June 2003	164	80	41	43	265	194	+71	48.78	
São Caetano	(Brazil)	29 July 2003	1 February 2004	34	14	10	10	45	29	+16	41.18	
Corinthians	(Brazil)	30 May 2004	28 February 2005	51	24	15	12	62	44	+18	47.06	
Atlético Mineiro	(Brazil)	5 April 2005	3 August 2005	21	4	6	11	28	33	−5	19.05	
Palmeiras	(Brazil)	17 May 2006	22 September 2006	20	8	5	7	32	30	+2	40.00	
Al Ain	(United Arab Emirates)	1 July 2007	27 December 2007	9	4	2	3	19	13	+6	44.44	
Internacional	(Brazil)	12 June 2008	5 October 2009	105	57	24	24	195	104	+91	54.29	
Al Wahda	(United Arab Emirates)	3 September 2010	17 October 2010	5	2	3	0	9	2	+7	40.00	
Corinthians	(Brazil)	17 October 2010	4 December 2013	221	107	71	43	291	160	+131	48.42	
Corinthians	(Brazil)	15 December 2014	15 June 2016	106	65	24	17	183	80	+103	61.32	
Brazil	(Brazil)	20 June 2016	9 December 2022	81	60	15	6	174	30	+144	74.07	
Flamengo	(Brazil)	9 October 2023	30 September 2024	68	41	11	16	108	50	+58	60.29	
Cruzeiro	(Brazil)	1 January 2026	15 March 2026	17	8	3	6	25	22	+3	47.06	
Botafogo	(Brazil)	16 September 2026	present	8	2	1	5	5	14	−9	25.00	
Total				1,217	595	335	287	1,829	1,123	+706	48.89	—

== Honours ==
=== Manager ===
Veranópolis

- Campeonato Gaúcho Série A2: 1993

Caxias

- Campeonato Gaúcho: 2000

Grêmio

- Campeonato Gaúcho: 2001
- Copa do Brasil: 2001

Internacional

- Copa Sudamericana: 2008
- Campeonato Gaúcho: 2009
- Suruga Bank Championship: 2009

Corinthians

- Copa Libertadores: 2012
- Campeonato Brasileiro Série A: 2011, 2015
- FIFA Club World Cup: 2012
- Campeonato Paulista: 2013
- Recopa Sudamericana: 2013

Flamengo

- Campeonato Carioca: 2024

Cruzeiro

- Campeonato Mineiro: 2026

Brazil

- Copa América: 2019

=== Individual ===
- South American Manager of the Year: 2017
- Campeonato Brasileiro Série A Manager of the Year: 2015
- Manager Football of the Year in Brazil: 2011, 2015

== See also ==
- List of football managers with the most matches
- List of Brazil national football team managers
