= Kauã Prates =

Brazilian footballer (born 2008)

Personal information
- Full name: Kauã Prates de Almeida
- Date of birth: 12 August 2008 (age 18)
- Place of birth: Montanha, Brazil
- Height: 1.83 m (6 ft 0 in)
- Position: Left-back

Team information
- Current team: Borussia Dortmund
- Number: 36

Youth career
- 2019–2025: Cruzeiro

Senior career*
| Years | Team | Apps | (Gls) |
| 2025–2026 | Cruzeiro | 13 | (1) |
| 2026– | Borussia Dortmund | 1 | (0) |

International career
| 2025– | Brazil U17 | 5 | (0) |
| 2026– | Brazil U20 | 2 | (0) |
- * Club domestic league appearances and goals as of 23:25, 29 August 2026 (UTC)

Kauã Prates de Almeida (born 12 August 2008) is a Brazilian footballer who plays as a left-back for Bundesliga club Borussia Dortmund.

== Club career ==
=== Cruzeiro ===
Born in Montanha, Espírito Santo, Kauã Prates joined Cruzeiro's youth sides in 2019, for the under-11s. In September 2024, he signed his first professional contract with the club, agreeing to a three-year deal.

Kauã Prates made his first team debut on 7 May 2025, starting in a 1–1 away draw against Mushuc Runa, for the season's Copa Sudamericana. He scored his first senior goal the following 10 January, but in a 2–1 Campeonato Mineiro home loss to Pouso Alegre.

=== Borussia Dortmund ===
On 19 February 2026, Bundesliga side Borussia Dortmund announced the signing of Kauã Prates on a five-year contract, effective in August, after his 18th birthday.

== Career statistics ==
As of match played 8 September 2026

Appearances and goals by club, season and competition
| Club | Season | League | | | State league (Note: Includes Campeonato Mineiro) | | National cup (Note: Includes Copa do Brasil) | | Continental | | Other | | Total | |
| Club | Season | Division | Apps | Goals | Apps | Goals | Apps | Goals | Apps | Goals | Apps | Goals | Apps | Goals |
|---|---|---|---|---|---|---|---|---|---|---|---|---|---|---|
| Cruzeiro | 2025 | Série A | 8 | 0 | — | | 1 | 0 | 3 (Note: Appearances in Copa Sudamericana) | 0 | — | | 12 | 0 |
| Cruzeiro | 2026 | Série A | 1 | 0 | 4 | 1 | 1 | 0 | 0 | 0 | — | | 6 | 1 |
| Cruzeiro | Total | | 9 | 0 | 4 | 1 | 2 | 0 | 3 | 0 | — | | 18 | 1 |
| Borussia Dortmund | 2026–27 | Bundesliga | 1 | 0 | — | | 1 | 0 | 1 (Note: Appearances in UEFA Champions League) | 0 | 0 | 0 | 3 | 0 |
| Career total | | | 10 | 0 | 4 | 1 | 3 | 0 | 4 | 0 | 0 | 0 | 21 | 1 |
