= Kaique Kenji =

Brazilian footballer

Personal information
- Full name: Kaique Kenji Takamura Correa
- Date of birth: 30 January 2006 (age 20)
- Place of birth: São Paulo, Brazil
- Height: 1.79 m (5 ft 10 in)
- Position: Winger

Team information
- Current team: Cruzeiro
- Number: 70

Youth career
- 2015–2017: Corinthians
- 2017–2019: Juventus-SP
- 2019–2022: São Caetano
- 2022–2024: Cruzeiro

Senior career*
Years	Team	Apps	(Gls)
2024–	Cruzeiro	15	(2)
- * Club domestic league appearances and goals as of 9 April 2026 (UTC)

Kaique Kenji Takamura Correa (born 30 January 2006) is a Brazilian professional footballer who plays as a winger for the Campeonato Brasileiro Série A club Cruzeiro.

== Club career ==
Kenji began playing football with Corinthians before he was 10, and followed that up with stints at Juventus-SP and São Caetano, before moving to the youth academy of Cruzeiro in 2022. In 2023, he signed his first professional contract with Cruzeiro for 3 seasons. On 6 September 2024, he renewed professional contract until 2028 after scoring 24 goals and providing 14 assists in 30 games as a U20, and was promoted to their first team. He made his senior and professional debut with Cruzeiro as a substitute in a 2–1 Campeonato Brasileiro Série A loss to Corinthians on 20 November 2024. He made the matchday squad for Cruzeiro at the 2024 Copa Sudamericana final, coming on as a substitute as they lost to Racing Club on 23 November 2024.

== International career ==
Kenji was called up to the Brazil U20s in October 2024 for a camp to train for the 2025 South American U-20 Championship, but had to drop from the squad due to an injury.

== Personal life ==
Kenji was born in Brazil, and is of Afro-Brazilian descent through his father, and Japanese and Italian descent through his mother. His father is the football agent and former Brazil international footballer Kléber de Carvalho Corrêa.
