= Japa (footballer, born 2004) =

Brazilian footballer (born 2004)

Personal information
- Full name: João Wellington Gadelha Melo de Oliveira
- Date of birth: 2 January 2004 (age 22)
- Place of birth: Goianinha, Brazil
- Height: 1.86 m (6 ft 1 in)
- Position: Midfielder

Team information
- Current team: Mirassol (on loan from Cruzeiro)
- Number: 5

Youth career
- Cruzeiro

Senior career*
Years	Team	Apps	(Gls)
2023–	Cruzeiro	28	(1)
2026–	→ Mirassol (loan)	0	(0)
- * Club domestic league appearances and goals as of 14:58, 15 January 2026 (UTC)

João Wellington Gadelha Melo de Oliveira (born 2 January 2004), commonly known as Japa, is a Brazilian footballer who plays as a midfielder for Mirassol, on loan from Cruzeiro.

== Career ==
Japa was born in Goianinha, Rio Grande do Norte. A Cruzeiro youth graduate, he signed his first professional contract with the club on 14 December 2021. On 16 May 2023, he further extended his link until 2026.

Japa made his professional – and Série A – debut on 22 October 2023, coming on as a second-half substitute for fellow youth graduate Kaiki Bruno in a 1–0 away win over rivals Atlético Mineiro. Definitely promoted to the first team for the 2024 season, he featured rarely before suffering a serious thigh injury in January 2025, which sidelined him for more than ten months.

Japa scored his first senior goal on 14 January 2026, netting his side's second in a 2–1 Campeonato Mineiro away win over Tombense.

== Career statistics ==
As of 16 January 2026

Club	Season	League			State League		Cup		Continental		Other		Total	
Club	Season	Division	Apps	Goals	Apps	Goals	Apps	Goals	Apps	Goals	Apps	Goals	Apps	Goals
Cruzeiro	2023	Série A	7	0	0	0	—		—		—		7	0
Cruzeiro	2024	Série A	10	0	4	0	1	0	0	0	—		15	0
Cruzeiro	2025	Série A	5	0	0	0	0	0	0	0	—		5	0
Cruzeiro	2026	Série A	0	0	2	1	0	0	0	0	—		2	1
Career total			22	0	6	1	1	0	0	0	0	0	29	1
