= Christian (footballer, born 2000) =

Brazilian footballer

Personal information
- Full name: Christian Roberto Alves Cardoso
- Date of birth: 19 December 2000 (age 25)
- Place of birth: Jundiaí, Brazil
- Height: 1.78 m (5 ft 10 in)
- Position: Midfielder

Team information
- Current team: Krasnodar
- Number: 18

Youth career
- 2017–2019: Athletico Paranaense

Senior career*
Years	Team	Apps	(Gls)
2019–2024	Athletico Paranaense	158	(14)
2019	→ Juventude (loan)	2	(0)
2025–2026	Cruzeiro	63	(12)
2026–	Krasnodar	13	(3)
- * Club domestic league appearances and goals as of 22 November 2026

Christian Roberto Alves Cardoso (born 19 December 2000), simply known as Christian, is a Brazilian footballer who plays as a midfielder for Russian Premier League club Krasnodar.

== Club career ==
On 10 July 2026, Christian signed a four-year contract with Krasnodar in Russia.

== Career statistics ==
=== Club ===
As of 22 November 2026.

Club	Season	League			Cup		Continental		Other		Total	
Club	Season	Division	Apps	Goals	Apps	Goals	Apps	Goals	Apps	Goals	Apps	Goals
Athletico Paranaense	2019	Série A	0	0	0	0	0	0	7 (Note: Appearances in Campeonato Paranaense)	0	7	0
Athletico Paranaense	2020	Série A	30	2	2	0	4 (Note: Appearances in Copa Libertadores)	1	7	2	43	5
Athletico Paranaense	2021	Série A	32	2	8	1	11 (Note: Appearances in Copa Sudamericana)	2	2	0	53	5
Athletico Paranaense	2022	Série A	9	0	2	1	7 (Note: Five appearances, two goals in Copa Libertadores, two appearances in Recopa Sudamericana)	2	5	0	23	3
Athletico Paranaense	2023	Série A	21	4	6	0	5	1	9	2	41	7
Athletico Paranaense	2024	Série A	24	1	6	2	11	2	12	1	53	6
Athletico Paranaense	Total		116	9	24	4	38	8	42	5	220	26
Juventude (loan)	2019	Série C	2	0	0	0	—		—		2	0
Cruzeiro	2025	Série A	30	5	8	0	2	0	7 (Note: Appearances in Campeonato Mineiro)	0	47	5
Cruzeiro	2026	Série A	17	5	1	0	6	1	9	2	33	8
Cruzeiro	Total		47	10	9	0	8	1	16	2	80	13
Krasnodar	2026–27	Russian Premier League	13	3	4	0	—		—		17	3
Career total			178	22	37	4	46	9	58	7	319	42

== Honours ==
Athletico Paranaense

- Campeonato Paranaense: 2019, 2020, 2023
- Copa Sudamericana: 2021

Cruzeiro

- Campeonato Mineiro: 2026
