= Fabrício Bruno =

Brazilian footballer (born 1996)

Personal information
- Full name: Fabrício Bruno Soares de Faria
- Date of birth: 12 February 1996 (age 30)
- Place of birth: Ibirité, Minas Gerais, Brazil
- Height: 1.92 m (6 ft 4 in)
- Position: Centre back

Team information
- Current team: Cruzeiro
- Number: 15

Youth career
- 2015–2016: Cruzeiro

Senior career*
Years	Team	Apps	(Gls)
2016–2019	Cruzeiro	30	(1)
2017–2018	→ Chapecoense (loan)	46	(2)
2020–2022	Red Bull Bragantino	65	(1)
2022–2024	Flamengo	103	(6)
2025–	Cruzeiro	59	(3)

International career^{‡}
2024–	Brazil	6	(0)
- * Club domestic league appearances and goals as of 9 April 2026 ‡ National team caps and goals as of 18 November 2025

Fabrício Bruno Soares de Faria (born 12 February 1996), known as Fabrício Bruno (Brazilian Portuguese: [faˈbɾisju ˈbɾunu]), is a Brazilian footballer who plays as centre back for Campeonato Brasileiro Série A club Cruzeiro and the Brazil national team.

== Club career ==
=== Cruzeiro ===
==== Chapecoense (loan) ====
On 29 December 2016 Cruzeiro accepted Chapecoense's request and loaned Fabrício Bruno until 31 December 2017.

On 19 December 2017 Chapecoense extended Fabrício Bruno loan for another season.

Another loan extension was set for 2019 season, but Fabrício Burno requested to return to Cruzeiro.

=== Red Bull Bragantino ===
On 8 January 2020 Fabrício Bruno transferred from Cruzeiro to Red Bull Bragantino for a €440k transfer fee.

=== Flamengo ===
On 7 February 2022 Flamengo signed Fabrício Bruno from Red Bull Bragantino until 31 December 2025 for a €2.5m transfer fee.

=== Return to Cruzeiro ===
On 11 January 2025 Cruzeiro announced Fabrício's return. The defender signed until December 2028 and the €7m fee was the highest ever paid by Cruzeiro, not counting incentives.

== International career ==
Fabrício Bruno made his debut for the senior Brazil national team on 23 March 2024 in a friendly against England.

== Career statistics ==
=== Club ===
As of match played 14 December 2025

Appearances and goals by club, season and competition
Club	Season	League			State league (Note: Includes Campeonato Carioca, Campeonato Catarinense, Campeonato Mineiro)		Copa do Brasil		Continental		Other		Total	
Club	Season	Division	Apps	Goals	Apps	Goals	Apps	Goals	Apps	Goals	Apps	Goals	Apps	Goals
Cruzeiro	2016	Série A	7	1	1	0	0	0	–		0	0	8	1
Cruzeiro	2019	Série A	19	0	3	0	1	0	3 (Note: Appearance(s) in Copa Libertadores)	0	–		26	0
Cruzeiro	Total		26	1	4	0	1	0	3	0	0	0	34	1
Chapecoense (loan)	2017	Série A	25	1	7	0	1	0	5 (Note: One appearance in Copa Libertadores, four appearances in Copa Sudamericana)	0	2 (Note: One appearance in J.League Cup / Copa Sudamericana Championship, one appearance in Primeira Liga)	0	40	1
Chapecoense (loan)	2018	Série A	7	0	7	1	–		2	0	–		16	1
Chapecoense (loan)	Total		32	1	14	1	1	0	7	0	2	0	56	2
Red Bull Bragantino	2020	Série A	14	1	6	0	1	0	–		–		21	1
Red Bull Bragantino	2021	Série A	33	0	8	0	5	0	13 (Note: Appearances in Copa Sudamericana)	2	–		59	2
Red Bull Bragantino	2022	Série A	–		4	0	–		–		–		4	0
Red Bull Bragantino	Total		47	1	18	0	6	0	13	2	0	0	84	3
Flamengo	2022	Série A	13	2	8	0	5	0	1	0	1 (Note: Appearance in Supercopa do Brasil)	0	28	2
Flamengo	2023	Série A	34	0	9	3	10	0	7	0	4 (Note: Two appearances in Recopa Sudamericana, two appearances in FIFA Club World Cup)	0	64	3
Flamengo	2024	Série A	28	1	11	0	9	0	8	0	0	0	56	1
Flamengo	Total		75	3	28	3	24	0	16	0	5	0	148	6
Cruzeiro	2025	Série A	33	3	8	0	8	1	4	0	–		53	4
Career total			213	8	72	4	40	1	43	2	7	0	375	16

=== International ===
As of match played 18 November 2025

Appearances and goals by national team and year
National team	Year	Apps	Goals
Brazil	2024	2	0
Brazil	2025	4	0
Total		6	0

== Honours ==
=== Club ===
Chapecoense

- Campeonato Catarinense: 2017

Cruzeiro

- Campeonato Mineiro: 2019, 2026

Flamengo

- Copa Libertadores: 2022
- Copa do Brasil: 2022, 2024
- Campeonato Carioca: 2024

=== Individual ===
- Campeonato Carioca Team of the Season: 2024
- Bola de Prata: 2025
- Campeonato Brasileiro Série A Team of the Year: 2025
