= João Marcelo (footballer, born 2000) =

Brazilian footballer (born 2000)

Personal information
- Full name: João Marcelo Messias Ferreira
- Date of birth: 13 June 2000 (age 26)
- Place of birth: Rio de Janeiro, Brazil
- Height: 1.89 m (6 ft 2 in)
- Position: Centre-back

Team information
- Current team: Cruzeiro
- Number: 43

Youth career
- –2019: Boavista-RJ
- 2019: → Grêmio (loan)

Senior career*
| Years | Team | Apps | (Gls) |
| 2019 | Boavista-RJ | 1 | (0) |
| 2020–2021 | Tombense | 2 | (0) |
| 2020–2021 | → Porto B (loan) | 31 | (2) |
| 2021–2023 | Porto B | 50 | (10) |
| 2021–2024 | Porto | 0 | (0) |
| 2023–2024 | → Cruzeiro (loan) | 9 | (0) |
| 2024– | Cruzeiro | 53 | (1) |
- * Club domestic league appearances and goals as of 26 August 2026

João Marcelo Messias Ferreira (born 13 June 2000) is a Brazilian professional footballer who plays as a centre-back for Campeonato Brasileiro Série A club Cruzeiro.

== Career statistics Club ==
As of match played 16 May 2024

Appearances and goals by club, season and competition
| Club | Season | League | | | State league | | National cup | | Continental | | League cup | | Other | | Total | |
| Club | Season | Division | Apps | Goals | Apps | Goals | Apps | Goals | Apps | Goals | Apps | Goals | Apps | Goals | Apps | Goals |
|---|---|---|---|---|---|---|---|---|---|---|---|---|---|---|---|---|
| Boavista | 2019 | Série D | 1 | 0 | 0 | 0 | 0 | 0 | — | | — | | 0 | 0 | 1 | 0 |
| Tombense | 2020 | Série C | 0 | 0 | 2 (Note: Appearances in Campeonato Mineiro) | 0 | 0 | 0 | — | | — | | 0 | 0 | 2 | 0 |
| Porto B (loan) | 2020–21 | Liga Portugal 2 | 31 | 2 | — | | — | | — | | — | | — | | 31 | 2 |
| Porto B | 2021–22 | Liga Portugal 2 | 24 | 3 | — | | — | | — | | — | | — | | 24 | 3 |
| Porto B | 2022–23 | Liga Portugal 2 | 26 | 7 | — | | — | | — | | — | | — | | 26 | 7 |
| Porto B | Total | | 81 | 12 | — | | — | | — | | — | | — | | 81 | 12 |
| Porto | 2021–22 | Primeira Liga | 0 | 0 | — | | 1 | 0 | — | | 1 | 0 | — | | 2 | 0 |
| Porto | 2022–23 | Primeira Liga | 0 | 0 | — | | 0 | 0 | — | | 0 | 0 | 0 | 0 | 0 | 0 |
| Porto | Total | | 0 | 0 | — | | 1 | 0 | — | | 1 | 0 | 0 | 0 | 2 | 0 |
| Cruzeiro (loan) | 2023 | Série A | 5 | 0 | — | | — | | — | | — | | — | | 5 | 0 |
| Cruzeiro | 2024 | Série A | 5 | 0 | 10 | 0 | — | | 4 | 0 | — | | — | | 19 | 0 |
| Cruzeiro | Total | | 10 | 0 | 10 | 0 | — | | 4 | 0 | — | | — | | 24 | 0 |
| Career total | | | 92 | 13 | 11 | 1 | 1 | 0 | 4 | 0 | 1 | 0 | 0 | 0 | 107 | 12 |

== Honours ==
Porto

- Supertaça Cândido de Oliveira: 2022

Individual

- Liga Portugal 2 Defender of the Month: October/November 2022
