= Keny Arroyo =

Ecuadorian footballer (born 2006)

Personal information
- Full name: Keny Alexander Arroyo Alvarado
- Date of birth: 14 February 2006 (age 20)
- Place of birth: Guayaquil, Ecuador
- Height: 1.76 m (5 ft 9 in)
- Position: Winger

Team information
- Current team: Cruzeiro
- Number: 99

Youth career
- Academia Alfaro Moreno
- 2016–2023: Independiente del Valle

Senior career*
| Years | Team | Apps | (Gls) |
| 2023–2025 | Independiente del Valle | 31 | (3) |
| 2025 | Beşiktaş | 11 | (1) |
| 2025- | Cruzeiro | 46 | (9) |

International career^{‡}
| 2023 | Ecuador U17 | 12 | (3) |
| 2024– | Ecuador | 5 | (0) |
- * Club domestic league appearances and goals as of 12 October 2026 ‡ National team caps and goals as of 17:30, 5 October 2026 (UTC)

Keny Alexander Arroyo Alvarado (born 14 February 2006), sometimes known as Cheche Arroyo, is an Ecuadorian footballer who plays as a winger for Cruzeiro and the Ecuador national team.

== Career ==
Arroyo is a youth product of Academia Alfaro Moreno before moving to the youth academy of Independiente del Valle in 2016. He made his senior and professional debut with Independiente as a substitute in a 2–1 loss to Nacional on 2 December 2023. In February 2025 he signed with Turkish club Beşiktaş.

On 2 September 2025, Arroyo signed with Brazilian team Cruzeiro until the end of 2029.

== International career ==
Arroyo was selected by the Ecuador U17s to represent them at the 2023 South American U-17 Championship. Later that same year he was chosen for the 2023 FIFA U-17 World Cup.

He was called up to the senior Ecuador national team for a set of 2026 FIFA World Cup qualification matches in October 2024. He made his senior debut as a substitute in a 0–0 tie with Uruguay on 16 October 2024.

== Career statistics ==
=== Club ===
As of match played 12 October 2026

Appearances and goals by club, season and competition
| Club | Season | League | | | State League | | National cup | | Continental | | Other | | Total | |
| Club | Season | Division | Apps | Goals | Apps | Goals | Apps | Goals | Apps | Goals | Apps | Goals | Apps | Goals |
|---|---|---|---|---|---|---|---|---|---|---|---|---|---|---|
| Independiente del Valle | 2023 | LigaPro Serie A | 1 | 0 | — | | — | | — | | — | | 1 | 0 |
| Independiente del Valle | 2024 | LigaPro Serie A | 30 | 3 | — | | 6 | 2 | 7 (Note: Five appearances in Copa Libertadores, two appearances in Copa Sudamericana) | 0 | — | | 43 | 5 |
| Independiente del Valle | Total | | 31 | 3 | — | | 6 | 2 | 7 | 0 | — | | 44 | 5 |
| Beşiktaş | 2024–25 | Süper Lig | 11 | 1 | — | | 1 | 1 | — | | — | | 12 | 2 |
| Beşiktaş | 2025–26 | Süper Lig | 0 | 0 | — | | 0 | 0 | 2 (Note: Appearances in UEFA Conference League) | 0 | — | | 2 | 0 |
| Beşiktaş | Total | | 11 | 1 | — | | 1 | 1 | 2 | 0 | — | | 14 | 2 |
| Cruzeiro | 2025 | Série A | 13 | 2 | — | | 2 | 2 | — | | — | | 15 | 4 |
| Cruzeiro | 2026 | Série A | 25 | 4 | 8 | 1 | 6 | 2 | 7 (Note: Appearances in Copa Libertadores) | 1 | — | | 46 | 8 |
| Cruzeiro | Total | | 38 | 6 | 8 | 1 | 8 | 4 | 7 | 1 | — | | 61 | 12 |
| Career total | | | 80 | 10 | 8 | 1 | 15 | 7 | 16 | 1 | 0 | 0 | 119 | 19 |

=== International ===
As of match played 5 October 2026

Appearances and goals by national team and year
| National team | Year | Apps | Goals |
|---|---|---|---|
| Ecuador | 2024 | 2 | 0 |
| Ecuador | 2026 | 3 | 0 |
| Total | | 5 | 0 |
