= 2026 Campeonato Mineiro =

Football championship of Minas Gerais, Brazil

Campeonato Mineiro
- Season: 2026
- Dates: 10 January – 8 March
- Champions: Cruzeiro
- Relegated: Democrata–GV; Athletic Club
- Matches: 59
- Goals: 137 (2.32 per match)
- Top goalscorer: Kaio Jorge (7 goals)

The 2026 Campeonato Mineiro (officially Campeonato Mineiro SICOOB 2026 – Módulo I for sponsorship reasons) was the 112th edition of the state championship of Minas Gerais organized by the FMF. The competition was start on 10 January and ended on 8 March 2026.

Atlético Mineiro had won the last six titles, but were defeated in the final by rivals Cruzeiro.

== Format ==
=== First stage ===
The 2026 Módulo I first stage will be played by the ten teams participating in 2025 Módulo I not relegated, in addition to the two teams promoted from 2025 Módulo II. The 12 teams are divided into three groups of four teams in the first phase; the teams will play against those clubs in the other groups. At the end of the first phase, the leaders of the 3 groups plus the best second place overall qualify for the semifinals.

=== Knockout stage ===
The knockout phase features the 4 qualified teams from the previous phase in a two-legged tie in the semi-finals, where the team with the best seed has the right to choose the order of the legs. In the event of an aggregate draw, a penalty shootout will be held. The final will be a single match, scheduled for March 8th, with the federation as the host country.

=== Relegation ===
The two clubs with the worst overall campaigns will be automatically relegated to the 2027 Módulo II.

== Participating teams ==
Locations of the 2025 Campeonato Mineiro teams
Locations of the 2026 Campeonato Mineiro teams – city of Belo Horizonte

Team	Home city	Head coach	2025 result
América Mineiro	Belo Horizonte	Alberto Valentim	2nd
Athletic Club	São João del-Rei	Alex	5th
Atlético Mineiro	Belo Horizonte	Eduardo Domínguez	1st
Betim	Betim	Ricardo Drubscky	7th
Cruzeiro	Belo Horizonte	Artur Jorge	4th
Democrata-GV	Governador Valadares	Wladimir Araújo	8th
Itabirito	Itabirito	Marcelo Caranhato	9th
North	Montes Claros	Kléberson	1st (Módulo II)
Pouso Alegre	Pouso Alegre	Danilo	10th
Tombense	Tombos	Cristóvão Borges	3th
Uberlândia	Uberlândia	Gustavo Brancão (caretaker)	6th
URT	Patos de Minas	Ito Roque	2nd (Módulo II)

== First stage ==
=== Group A ===
Pos	Team	Pld	W	D	L	GF	GA	GD	Pts	Qualification or relegation
1	Atlético Mineiro	8	3	5	0	16	8	+8	14	Knockout stage
2	URT	8	3	2	3	7	7	0	11	
3	Uberlândia	8	2	3	3	8	12	−4	9	
4	Democrata-GV (R)	8	2	1	5	3	8	−5	7	2027 Módulo II

Source: FMF
(R) Relegated

=== Group B ===
Pos	Team	Pld	W	D	L	GF	GA	GD	Pts	Qualification or relegation
1	América Mineiro	8	4	3	1	10	6	+4	15	Knockout stage
2	Pouso Alegre	8	4	1	3	14	14	0	13	Knockout stage
3	Tombense	8	3	3	2	10	7	+3	12	
4	Betim	8	2	3	3	6	9	−3	9	

Source: FMF

=== Group C ===
Pos	Team	Pld	W	D	L	GF	GA	GD	Pts	Qualification or relegation
1	Cruzeiro	8	5	0	3	14	7	+7	15	Knockout stage
2	North	8	3	2	3	14	11	+3	11	
3	Itabirito	8	2	1	5	10	17	−7	7	
4	Athletic Club (R)	8	1	4	3	7	13	−6	7	2027 Módulo II

Source: FMF
(R) Relegated

== Troféu Inconfidência ==
=== Bracket ===
Semi-finals
C2	North (p)	1	0	1
A3	Uberlândia	1	0	1
A2	URT	1	3	4
B3	Tombense	0	1	1

Final
C2	North	2	1	3
A2	URT	1	0	1

== Knockout stage ==
=== Bracket ===
Semi-finals
B2	Pouso Alegre	1	0	1
C1	Cruzeiro	2	1	3
A1	Atlético Mineiro (p)	1	1	2
B1	América Mineiro	1	1	2

Final
C1	Cruzeiro	1
A1	Atlético Mineiro	0

=== Semi-finals ===
==== Group F ====
21 February 2026
18:30

Pouso Alegre	1–2	Cruzeiro
Romário 89' (pen.)	Report	Lucas Silva 64'; Bruno Rodrigues 75'

Manduzão, Pouso Alegre
Attendance: 13,632
Referee: André Luiz Skettino Policarpo Bento
28 February 2026
18:30

Cruzeiro	1–0	Pouso Alegre
Kaio Jorge 90+7'	Report

Mineirão, Belo Horizonte
Attendance: 31,304
Referee: Daniel da Cunha Oliveira Filho

==== Group G ====
22 February 2026
18:00

Atlético Mineiro	1–1	América Mineiro
Dudu 51'	Report	Yarlen 90+3'

Arena MRV, Belo Horizonte
Attendance: 31,916
Referee: Matheus Delgado Candançan
1 March 2026
18:00

América Mineiro	0–0	Atlético Mineiro
	Report
Penalties
Eduardo Person (penalty missed); Gabriel Barros (penalty scored); Felipe Amaral (penalty missed); Paulinho (penalty scored)	2–4	(penalty scored) Hulk; (penalty scored) Renan Lodi; (penalty missed) Júnior Alonso; (penalty scored) Maycon; (penalty scored) Everson

Independência, Belo Horizonte
Attendance: 5,382
Referee: Flávio Rodrigues de Souza

=== Final ===
8 March 2026
18:00

Cruzeiro	1–0	Atlético Mineiro
Kaio Jorge 60'	Report

Mineirão, Belo Horizonte
Attendance: 49,675
Referee: Matheus Delgado Candançan

== Top goalscorers ==
Rank	Player	Club	Goals
1	(Brazil) Kaio Jorge	Cruzeiro	7
2	(Brazil) Gabriel Rossetto	North	5
2	(Brazil) Gabriel Moysés	URT	5
