= 2025 Cruzeiro EC season =

Cruzeiro
2025 season
- Owner: Pedro Lourenço
- President: Lidson Potsch
- Manager: Fernando Diniz (until 27 January); Wesley Carvalho (interim); Leonardo Jardim (from 4 February)
- Stadium: Mineirão
- Série A: 3rd
- Campeonato Mineiro: Semi-finals
- Copa do Brasil: Semi-finals
- Copa Sudamericana: Group stage
- Top goalscorer: League: Kaio Jorge (21); All: Kaio Jorge (26)
- Average home league attendance: 44,089
Home colors	Away colors	Third colors

The 2025 season was the 105th in the Cruzeiro Esporte Clube's existence.

Along with the Campeonato Brasileiro Série A, the club also competed in the Campeonato Mineiro, in the Copa do Brasil and in the Copa Sudamericana.

== Current squad ==
As of 2 September 2025

Note: Flags indicate national team as defined under FIFA eligibility rules; some limited exceptions apply. Players may hold more than one non-FIFA nationality.

No.	Pos.	Nation	Player
1	GK	BRA	Cássio
2	DF	BRA	Kauã Moraes
5	MF	BRA	Walace
6	DF	BRA	Kaiki Bruno
7	FW	BRA	Marquinhos
8	MF	BRA	Matheus Henrique
9	FW	BRA	Gabriel Barbosa
10	MF	BRA	Matheus Pereira
11	FW	COD	Yannick Bolasie
12	DF	BRA	William
14	DF	PAR	Mateo Gamarra (on loan from Athletico-PR)
15	DF	BRA	Fabrício Bruno
16	MF	BRA	Lucas Silva
17	FW	COL	Luis Sinisterra (on loan from Bournemouth)
19	FW	BRA	Kaio Jorge

No.	Pos.	Nation	Player
20	MF	BRA	Ryan Guilherme
21	MF	BRA	Carlos Eduardo
23	DF	BRA	Fagner (on loan from Corinthians)
25	DF	ARG	Lucas Villalba
29	MF	ARG	Lucas Romero
34	DF	BRA	Jonathan Jesus
36	DF	BRA	Kauã Prates
41	GK	BRA	Léo Aragão
43	DF	BRA	João Marcelo
77	MF	BRA	Japa
81	GK	BRA	Otávio
88	MF	BRA	Christian
94	FW	BEL	Wanderson
99	FW	ECU	Keny Arroyo

=== Under-20s and Academy ===
Note: Flags indicate national team as defined under FIFA eligibility rules; some limited exceptions apply. Players may hold more than one non-FIFA nationality.

No.	Pos.	Nation	Player
24	GK	BRA	Marcelo
32	DF	BRA	Janderson
35	MF	BRA	Murilo Rhikman
37	MF	ITA	Cauan Baptistella
39	FW	BRA	Ruan Índio
40	MF	BRA	Rhuan Gabriel

No.	Pos.	Nation	Player
42	MF	BRA	Nicolas Pontes
44	DF	BRA	Bruno Alves
51	GK	BRA	Vitor Lamounier
56	FW	BRA	Fernando
57	FW	BRA	Rayan Lelis
70	FW	BRA	Kaique Kenji

=== Out on loan ===
Note: Flags indicate national team as defined under FIFA eligibility rules; some limited exceptions apply. Players may hold more than one non-FIFA nationality.

No.	Pos.	Nation	Player
—	DF	COL	Helibelton Palacios (at Millonarios until 31 December 2025)
—	DF	BRA	Marlon (at Grêmio until 31 December 2025)
—	DF	BRA	Pedrão (at Pafos until 30 June 2026)
—	DF	BRA	Weverton (at Vila Nova until 22 November 2025)
—	DF	BRA	Zé Ivaldo (at Santos until 31 December 2025)
—	MF	BRA	Ian Luccas (at Ferroviária until 22 November 2025)
—	MF	BRA	Jhosefer (at América-MG until 22 November 2025)
—	MF	PAR	Fabrizio Peralta (at Cerro Porteño until 30 June 2026)

No.	Pos.	Nation	Player
—	MF	BRA	Rodriguinho (at Ceará until 31 December 2025)
—	MF	BRA	Vitinho (at Náutico until 22 November 2025)
—	FW	BRA	Arthur Viana (at Ehime FC until 31 December 2025)
—	FW	BRA	Gui Meira (at Feirense until 30 June 2026)
—	FW	BRA	João Pedro (at Volta Redonda until 22 November 2025)
—	FW	ARG	Lautaro Díaz (at Santos until 31 July 2026)
—	FW	BRA	Tevis (at Athletico until 22 November 2025)

=== First-team staff ===
Position	Name	Nationality
Head coach	Leonardo Jardim	POR
Assistant coaches	Antonio Vieira	POR
Assistant coaches	Wesley Carvalho	BRA
Analyst	Diogo Dias	POR
Analyst	José Barros	POR
Goalkeeping coaches	João Paulo Lacerda	BRA
Goalkeeping coaches	Robertinho	BRA
Fitness coach	Omar Feitosa	BRA
Physiologist	Nathália Arnosti	BRA
Performance analyst	Gabriel Eloi	BRA
Performance analyst	Henrique Américo	BRA

== Friendlies ==
15 January	Cruzeiro (Brazil)	1–1	(Brazil) São Paulo	Orlando, United States
21:30 UTC−3	Matheus Pereira 1'		Luciano 45+1'	Stadium: Inter&Co Stadium

18 January	Cruzeiro (Brazil)	0–0	(Brazil) Atlético-MG	Orlando, United States
17:00 UTC−3				Stadium: Inter&Co Stadium

3 July	Cruzeiro (Brazil)	0–1	(Argentina) Defensa y Justicia	Cariacica
20:00 UTC−3			Osorio 64'	Stadium: Estádio Kleber Andrade

6 July	Cruzeiro (Brazil)	1–0	(Argentina) Banfield	Cariacica
16:00 UTC−3	Matheus Pereira 37'			Stadium: Estádio Kleber Andrade

== Competitions ==
=== Overview ===
Competition	First match	Last match	Starting round	Final position	Record							
Competition	First match	Last match	Starting round	Final position	Pld	W	D	L	GF	GA	GD	Win %
Campeonato Mineiro	19 January	22 February	First stage	Semi-finals	10	3	4	3	13	11	+2	30.00
Copa do Brasil	1 May	14 December	Third round	Semi-finals	8	6	1	1	13	2	+11	75.00
Copa Sudamericana	1 April	28 May	Group stage	Group stage	6	1	2	3	5	7	−2	16.67
Campeonato Brasileiro Série A	29 March	7 December	Matchday 1	3rd	38	19	13	6	55	31	+24	50.00
Total					62	29	20	13	86	51	+35	46.77

Source: Competitions

=== Campeonato Mineiro ===
==== First stage ====
Pos	Team	Pld	W	D	L	GF	GA	GD	Pts	Qualification or relegation
1	Cruzeiro	8	3	2	3	11	9	+2	11	Knockout stage
2	Pouso Alegre	8	2	2	4	7	15	−8	8	
3	Aymorés (R)	8	1	4	3	3	5	−2	7	2026 Módulo II
4	Villa Nova (R)	8	1	1	6	4	17	−13	4	2026 Módulo II

Source: FMF
(R) Relegated

19 January 1	Cruzeiro	1–0	Tombense	Belo Horizonte
20:00 UTC−3	Bolasie 35'	Report		Stadium: Mineirão; Attendance: 16,492; Referee: André Luiz Skettino Policarpo Bento

22 January 2	Athletic Club	1–0	Cruzeiro	Brasília
19:00 UTC−3	Fabrício Bruno 70' (o.g.)	Report		Stadium: Estádio Nacional Mané Garrincha; Attendance: 11,854; Referee: Daniel da Cunha Oliveira Filho

25 January 3	Cruzeiro	1–1	Betim	Belo Horizonte
16:30 UTC−3	Lautaro 87'	Report	Eurico 38'	Stadium: Mineirão; Attendance: 33,308; Referee: Felipe Fernandes de Lima

30 January 4	Itabirito	1–4	Cruzeiro	Belo Horizonte
19:00 UTC−3	Luan 48' (pen.)	Report	Gabriel 14', 31', 45+9' (pen.); Marquinhos 34'	Stadium: Independência; Attendance: 2,329; Referee: Michel Patrick Costa Guimarães

2 February 5	Cruzeiro	3–1	Uberlândia	Belo Horizonte
18:30 UTC−3	Matheus Henrique 23'; Gabriel 42' (pen.); Dudu 79'	Report	Jean Silva 12'	Stadium: Mineirão; Attendance: 24,053; Referee: Antônio Márcio Teixeira da Silva

5 February 6	América Mineiro	1–1	Cruzeiro	Belo Horizonte
22:00 UTC−3	Fabinho 3'	Report	Bolasie 88'	Stadium: Independência; Attendance: 6,004; Referee: Vinícius Gomes do Amaral

9 February 7	Cruzeiro	0–2	Atlético Mineiro	Belo Horizonte
16:00 UTC−3		Report	Hulk 55', 87'	Stadium: Mineirão; Attendance: 60,834; Referee: Felipe Fernandes de Lima

12 February 8	Democrata-GV	2–1	Cruzeiro	Governador Valadares
19:00 UTC−3	Luann 16'; Antônio Júnior 80'	Report	Bolasie 4'	Stadium: Mamudão; Attendance: 11,853; Referee: André Luiz Skettino Policarpo Bento

==== Semi-finals ====
16 February First leg	Cruzeiro	1–1	América Mineiro	Belo Horizonte
18:30 UTC−3	Gabriel 42' (pen.)	Report	Cauan Barros 77'	Stadium: Mineirão; Attendance: 38,818; Referee: Anderson Daronco

22 February Second leg	América Mineiro	1–1 (1–1 agg.) (4–2 p)	Cruzeiro	Belo Horizonte
16:30 UTC−3	Marlon 32'	Report	Lucas Romero 40'	Stadium: Independência; Attendance: 5,251; Referee: Wilton Pereira Sampaio
	Penalties
	Fernando Elizari (penalty scored); Cauan Barros (penalty scored); Jonathas de Jesus (penalty scored); Figueiredo (penalty missed); Marlon (penalty scored)		(penalty missed) William; (penalty scored) Matheus Henrique; (penalty missed) Marlon Xavier; (penalty scored) Gabriel

=== Campeonato Brasileiro Série A ===
==== League table ====
Pos	Team	Pld	W	D	L	GF	GA	GD	Pts	Qualification or relegation
1	Flamengo (C)	38	23	10	5	78	27	+51	79	Qualification for Copa Libertadores group stage (Note: Flamengo qualified for the Copa Libertadores group stage by winning the 2025 Copa Libertadores.)
2	Palmeiras	38	23	7	8	66	33	+33	76	Qualification for Copa Libertadores group stage
3	Cruzeiro	38	19	13	6	55	31	+24	70	Qualification for Copa Libertadores group stage
4	Mirassol	38	18	13	7	63	39	+24	67	Qualification for Copa Libertadores group stage
5	Fluminense	38	19	7	12	50	39	+11	64	Qualification for Copa Libertadores group stage

Source: CBF
Rules for classification: 1) points; 2) wins; 3) goal difference; 4) goals scored; 5) head-to-head results (only between two teams); 6) fewest red cards; 7) fewest yellow cards; 8) drawing of lots.
(C) Champions

==== Results by round ====
Round	1	2	3	4	5	6	7	8	9	10	11	12	13	14	15	16	17	18	19	20	21	22	23	24	25	26	27	28	29	30	31	32	33	34	35	36	37	38
Ground	H	A	A	H	A	H	H	A	H	A	H	A	H	A	H	A	H	A	H	A	H	H	A	H	A	A	H	A	H	A	H	A	H	A	H	A	H	A
Result	W	L	D	W	L	W	W	W	D	W	W	D	W	W	W	W	L	W	L	D	W	W	W	W	L	D	D	D	W	D	W	W	D	D	W	D	D	L
Position	4	11	12	5	7	4	4	4	3	3	2	2	2	1	1	1	2	2	2	3	3	2	2	2	2	3	3	3	3	3	3	3	3	3	3	3	3	3

Updated to match(es) played on 7 December 2025. Source: Matches
A = Away; H = Home; W = Win; D = Draw; L = Loss; P = Postponed

==== Matches ====
29 March 1	Cruzeiro	2–1	Mirassol	Belo Horizonte
18:30 UTC−3	Dudu 14'; Gabriel 22'	Report	Lucas Ramon 45+3'	Stadium: Mineirão; Attendance: 40,837; Referee: Alex Gomes Stefano

6 April 2	Internacional	3–0	Cruzeiro	Porto Alegre
18:30 UTC−3	Alan Patrick 31'; Valencia 33'; Borré 77'	Report		Stadium: Beira-Rio; Attendance: 31,321; Referee: Marcelo de Lima Henrique

13 April 3	São Paulo	1–1	Cruzeiro	São Paulo
17:30 UTC−3	Ferreira 52'	Report	Kaio Jorge 65'	Stadium: Morumbi; Attendance: 37,566; Referee: Rodrigo José Pereira de Lima

17 April 4	Cruzeiro	3–0	Bahia	Belo Horizonte
21:30 UTC−3	Lucas Romero 45+7'; Kaio Jorge 65', 76'	Report		Stadium: Mineirão; Attendance: 26,557; Referee: Flávio Rodrigues de Souza

20 April 5	Red Bull Bragantino	1–0	Cruzeiro	Bragança Paulista
20:30 UTC−3	Jhon Jhon 15'	Report		Stadium: Nabi Abi Chedid; Attendance: 6,916; Referee: Alex Gomes Stefano

27 April 6	Cruzeiro	1–0	Vasco da Gama	Uberlândia
18:30 UTC−3	Christian 64'	Report		Stadium: Parque do Sabiá; Attendance: 15,398; Referee: Rafael Rodrigo Klein

4 May 7	Cruzeiro	2–1	Flamengo	Belo Horizonte
18:30 UTC−3	Kaio Jorge 15'; Gabriel 90+7'	Report	de Arrascaeta 44'	Stadium: Mineirão; Attendance: 52,752; Referee: Wilton Pereira Sampaio

11 May 8	Sport	0–4	Cruzeiro	Recife
16:00 UTC−3		Report	Igor Cariús 8' (o.g.); Kaio Jorge 18'; Matheus Pereira 45+1', 53'	Stadium: Ilha do Retiro; Attendance: 16,006; Referee: Raphael Claus

18 May 9	Cruzeiro	0–0	Atlético Mineiro	Belo Horizonte
20:30 UTC−3		Report		Stadium: Mineirão; Attendance: 61,106; Referee: Flávio Rodrigues de Souza

25 May 10	Fortaleza	0–2	Cruzeiro	Fortaleza
20:30 UTC−3		Report	Kaio Jorge 34'; Lucas Silva 41'	Stadium: Castelão; Attendance: 12,483; Referee: João Vitor Gobi

1 June 11	Cruzeiro	2–1	Palmeiras	Belo Horizonte
19:30 UTC−3	Kaio Jorge 2', 4'	Report	Allan 87'	Stadium: Mineirão; Attendance: 57,747; Referee: Rodrigo José Pereira de Lima

12 June 12	Vitória	0–0	Cruzeiro	Salvador
19:00 UTC−3		Report		Stadium: Barradão; Attendance: 6,264; Referee: Alex Gomes Stefano

13 July 13	Cruzeiro	4–1	Grêmio	Belo Horizonte
20:30 UTC−3	Kaio Jorge 25', 54', 77'; Villalba 33'	Report	André 64'	Stadium: Mineirão; Attendance: 31,668; Referee: Lucas Paulo Torezin

17 July 14	Fluminense	0–2	Cruzeiro	Rio de Janeiro
19:30 UTC−3		Report	Fabrício Bruno 30'; Kaio Jorge 35'	Stadium: Maracanã; Attendance: 45,681; Referee: Rafael Rodrigo Klein

20 July 15	Cruzeiro	4–0	Juventude	Belo Horizonte
16:00 UTC−3	Christian 39'; Gabriel 51', 63' (pen.); Carlos Eduardo 90+2'	Report		Stadium: Mineirão; Attendance: 52,850; Referee: Lucas Casagrande

23 July 16	Corinthians	0–0	Cruzeiro	São Paulo
19:30 UTC−3		Report		Stadium: Neo Química Arena; Attendance: 31,541; Referee: Alex Gomes Stefano

27 July 17	Cruzeiro	1–2	Ceará	Belo Horizonte
16:00 UTC−3	Kaio Jorge 4'	Report	Galeano 39', 60'	Stadium: Mineirão; Attendance: 52,802; Referee: Raphael Claus

3 August 18	Botafogo	0–2	Cruzeiro	Rio de Janeiro
16:00 UTC−3		Report	Christian 23'; Matheus Pereira 41'	Stadium: Nilton Santos; Attendance: 35,126; Referee: Matheus Delgado Candançan

10 August 19	Cruzeiro	1–2	Santos	Belo Horizonte
18:30 UTC−3	Fabrício Bruno 43'	Report	Guilherme 62'; Caballero 89'	Stadium: Mineirão; Attendance: 59,345; Referee: Wilton Pereira Sampaio

18 August 20	Mirassol	1–1	Cruzeiro	Mirassol
20:00 UTC−3	Negueba 65'	Report	Kaio Jorge 5'	Stadium: José Maria de Campos Maia; Attendance: 6,015; Referee: Bruno Arleu de Araújo

23 August 21	Cruzeiro	2–1	Internacional	Belo Horizonte
18:30 UTC−3	Matheus Pereira 19'; Kaio Jorge 58'	Report	Tabata 24'	Stadium: Mineirão; Attendance: 44,402; Referee: Matheus Delgado Candançan

30 August 22	Cruzeiro	1–0	São Paulo	Belo Horizonte
21:00 UTC−3	Matheus Pereira 64'	Report		Stadium: Mineirão; Attendance: 36,882; Referee: Anderson Daronco

15 September 23	Bahia	1–2	Cruzeiro	Salvador
20:00 UTC−3	Jean Lucas 66'	Report	Sinisterra 77'; Gabriel 86'	Stadium: Fonte Nova; Attendance: 32,160; Referee: Flávio Rodrigues de Souza

21 September 24	Cruzeiro	2–1	Red Bull Bragantino	Belo Horizonte
20:30 UTC−3	Lucas Silva 45+2'; Kaiki Bruno 77'	Report	Jhon Jhon 26'	Stadium: Mineirão; Attendance: 35,726; Referee: Lucas Paulo Torezin

27 September 25	Vasco da Gama	2–0	Cruzeiro	Rio de Janeiro
18:30 UTC−3	Rayan 8'; Paulo Henrique 61'	Report		Stadium: São Januário; Attendance: 20,342; Referee: Rodrigo José Pereira de Lima

2 October 26	Flamengo	0–0	Cruzeiro	Rio de Janeiro
20:30 UTC−3		Report		Stadium: Maracanã; Attendance: 72,565; Referee: Ramon Abatti Abel

5 October 27	Cruzeiro	1–1	Sport	Belo Horizonte
20:30 UTC−3	Gabriel 59'	Report	Derik Lacerda 41'	Stadium: Mineirão; Attendance: 50,969; Referee: Jefferson Ferreira de Moraes

15 October 28	Atlético Mineiro	1–1	Cruzeiro	Belo Horizonte
21:30 UTC−3	Ruan Tressoldi 51'	Report	Matheus Pereira 48'	Stadium: Arena MRV; Attendance: 40,388; Referee: Paulo César Zanovelli da Silva

18 October 29	Cruzeiro	1–0	Fortaleza	Belo Horizonte
21:00 UTC−3	Christian 21'	Report		Stadium: Mineirão; Attendance: 40,410; Referee: Rodrigo José Pereira de Lima

26 October 30	Palmeiras	0–0	Cruzeiro	São Paulo
20:30 UTC−3		Report		Stadium: Allianz Parque; Attendance: 40,209; Referee: Rafael Rodrigo Klein

1 November 31	Cruzeiro	3–1	Vitória	Belo Horizonte
16:00 UTC−3	Kaio Jorge 8' (pen.), 23'; Arroyo 45'	Report	Willian Oliveira 37'	Stadium: Mineirão; Attendance: 59,587; Referee: Jefferson Ferreira de Moraes

5 November 32	Grêmio	0–1	Cruzeiro	Porto Alegre
20:00 UTC−3		Report	Fabrício Bruno 43'	Stadium: Arena do Grêmio; Attendance: 20,050; Referee: Lucas Paulo Torezin

9 November 33	Cruzeiro	0–0	Fluminense	Belo Horizonte
16:00 UTC−3		Report		Stadium: Mineirão; Attendance: 53,283; Referee: Rodrigo José Pereira de Lima

20 November 34	Juventude	3–3	Cruzeiro	Caxias do Sul
16:00 UTC−3	Marcelo Hermes 8'; Gabriel Taliari 16', 59'	Report	Sinisterra 41'; Kaio Jorge 53', 85'	Stadium: Alfredo Jaconi; Attendance: 12,186; Referee: Sávio Pereira Sampaio

23 November 35	Cruzeiro	3–0	Corinthians	Belo Horizonte
20:30 UTC−3	Kaio Jorge 26', 49'; Arroyo 64'	Report		Stadium: Mineirão; Attendance: 30,673; Referee: Alex Gomes Stefano

29 November 36	Ceará	1–1	Cruzeiro	Fortaleza
20:30 UTC−3	Zanocelo 56'	Report	Willian Machado 71' (o.g.)	Stadium: Castelão; Attendance: 29,114; Referee: Sávio Pereira Sampaio

4 December 37	Cruzeiro	2–2	Botafogo	Belo Horizonte
19:30 UTC−3	Christian 15'; Matheus Pereira 50'	Report	Marçal 57'; Alex Telles 90+5' (pen.)	Stadium: Mineirão; Attendance: 34,649; Referee: Anderson Daronco

7 December 38	Santos	3–0	Cruzeiro	Santos
16:00 UTC−3	Thaciano 26', 28'; João Schmidt 60'	Report		Stadium: Vila Belmiro; Attendance: 15,068; Referee: Rodrigo José Pereira de Lima

=== Copa Sudamericana ===
Pos	Team	Pld	W	D	L	GF	GA	GD	Pts	Qualification	MUS	PAL	CRU	UNI
1	(Ecuador) Mushuc Runa	6	5	1	0	12	4	+8	16	Advance to round of 16	—	3–2	1–1	3–0
2	(Chile) Palestino	6	3	0	3	9	9	0	9	Advance to knockout round play-offs	0–2	—	2–1	2–0
3	(Brazil) Cruzeiro	6	1	2	3	5	7	−2	5		1–2	2–1	—	0–0
4	(Argentina) Unión	6	1	1	4	2	8	−6	4		0–1	1–2	1–0	—

Source: CONMEBOL
Rules for classification: 1) Points; 2) Goal difference; 3) Goals scored; 4) Away goals scored; 5) CONMEBOL ranking.

1 April 1	Unión (Argentina)	1–0	(Brazil) Cruzeiro	Santa Fe, Argentina
19:00 UTC−3	Díaz 90+4'	Report		Stadium: Estadio 15 de Abril; Attendance: 10,811; Referee: Andrés Matonte (Uruguay)

9 April 2	Cruzeiro (Brazil)	1–2	(Ecuador) Mushuc Runa	Belo Horizonte, Brazil
21:30 UTC−3	Gabriel Barbosa 67' (pen.)	Report	Orejuela 29'; Bentaberry 77'	Stadium: Mineirão; Attendance: 0 Referee: Mario Díaz de Vivar (Paraguay)

24 April 3	Palestino (Chile)	2–1	(Brazil) Cruzeiro	Coquimbo, Chile
21:30 UTC−3	Benítez 40'; Arias 86'	Report	Carlos Eduardo 83'	Stadium: Estadio Municipal Francisco Sánchez Rumoroso; Attendance: 3,930; Referee: Mathías De Armas (Uruguay)

7 May 4	Mushuc Runa (Ecuador)	1–1	(Brazil) Cruzeiro	Riobamba, Ecuador
21:30 UTC−3	Orejuela 54'	Report	Lautaro 61'	Stadium: Estadio Olímpico de Riobamba; Attendance: 4,504; Referee: Roberto Pérez (Peru)

14 May 5	Cruzeiro (Brazil)	2–1	(Chile) Palestino	Belo Horizonte, Brazil
21:30 UTC−3	Bolasie 69'; Gabriel Barbosa 90'	Report	Ariel Martínez 7'	Stadium: Mineirão; Attendance: 9,698; Referee: Kevin Ortega (Peru)

28 May 6	Cruzeiro (Brazil)	0–0	(Argentina) Unión	Belo Horizonte, Brazil
21:30 UTC−3		Report		Stadium: Mineirão; Attendance: 20,944; Referee: Blas Romero (Paraguay)

=== Copa do Brasil ===
==== Third round ====
1 May First leg	Cruzeiro	2–0	Vila Nova	Belo Horizonte
21:30 UTC−3	Kaio Jorge 34', 37'	Report		Stadium: Mineirão; Attendance: 27,772; Referee: Raphael Claus

22 May Second leg	Vila Nova	0–3 (0–5 agg.)	Cruzeiro	Goiânia
19:00 UTC−3		Report	Carlos Eduardo 56', 75'; Jonathan Jesus 86'	Stadium: Estádio Serra Dourada; Attendance: 14,749; Referee: Gustavo Ervino Bauermann

==== Round of 16 ====
30 July First leg	Cruzeiro	0–0	CRB	Belo Horizonte
19:30 UTC−3		Report		Stadium: Mineirão; Attendance: 33,068; Referee: Edina Alves Batista

7 August Second leg	CRB	0–2	Cruzeiro	Maceió
21:00 UTC−3		Report	Villalba 43'; Carlos Eduardo 90+6'	Stadium: Estádio Rei Pelé; Attendance: 15,200; Referee: Flávio Rodrigues de Souza

==== Quarter-finals ====
27 August First leg	Atlético Mineiro	0–2	Cruzeiro	Belo Horizonte
19:30 UTC−3		Report	Fabrício Bruno 50'; Kaio Jorge 64'	Stadium: Arena MRV; Attendance: 44,286; Referee: Ramon Abatti Abel

11 September Second leg	Cruzeiro	2–0 (4–0 agg.)	Atlético Mineiro	Belo Horizonte
19:30 UTC−3	Kaio Jorge 5', 48'	Report		Stadium: Mineirão; Attendance: 61,584; Referee: Rafael Rodrigo Klein

==== Semi-finals ====
10 December First leg	Cruzeiro	0–1	Corinthians	Belo Horizonte
21:30 UTC−3		Report	Depay 22'	Stadium: Mineirão; Attendance: 59,052; Referee: Anderson Daronco

14 December Second leg	Corinthians	1–2 (2–2 agg.) (5–4 p)	Cruzeiro	São Paulo
18:00 UTC−3	Matheus Bidu 55'	Report	Arroyo 40', 50'	Stadium: Neo Química Arena; Attendance: 47,520; Referee: Rodrigo José Pereira de Lima
	Penalties
	Yuri Alberto (penalty missed); Depay (penalty scored); Garro (penalty scored); Vitinho (penalty scored); Gustavo Henrique (penalty scored); Breno Bidon (penalty scored)		(penalty scored) Matheus Pereira; (penalty scored) Wanderson; (penalty scored) William; (penalty scored) Lucas Silva; (penalty missed) Gabriel; (penalty missed) Walace
