= Janderson =

Janderson may refer to:

- Janderson (footballer, born February 1999), Janderson Santos de Souza, Brazilian football forward for Atlético Goianiense
- Janderson (footballer, born May 1999), Janderson de Carvalho Costa, Brazilian football forward for Botafogo
- Janderson (footballer, born 2005), José Janderson da Silva Marques, Brazilian football centre-back for Cruzeiro
