= 2026 Athletic Club (MG) season =

Athletic Club
2026 season
- Manager: Rui Duarte (until 17 February); Alex (from 21 February)
- Stadium: Estádio Joaquim Portugal
- Campeonato Brasileiro Série B: 13th
- Campeonato Mineiro: First phase
- Copa do Brasil: Fifth round

The 2026 season is Athletic Club’s 117th year and its second consecutive season in the Campeonato Brasileiro Série B. The club has reached the fifth round of the Copa do Brasil and was eliminated in the first phase of the state championship.

== Transfers ==
=== In ===
Pos.	Player	Transferred from	Fee	Date	Source
MF	(Colombia) Gian Cabezas	(Portugal) Alverca	Loan	1 January 2026	
DF	(Brazil) Jhonathan	(Brazil) Fortaleza B		8 January 2026	
DF	(Brazil) Zeca	(Brazil) Coritiba		13 January 2026	
MF	(Ecuador) Dixon Vera	(Ecuador) Emelec		15 January 2026	
MF	(Brazil) Ian Luccas	(Brazil) Cruzeiro	Loan	19 January 2026	
MF	(Brazil) Kauan	(Brazil) Fortaleza	Loan	28 January 2026	
GK	(Brazil) Jhonatan	Unattached		11 February 2026	
MF	(Brazil) Gustavinho	Unattached		25 February 2026	
DF	(Brazil) Lucas Belezi	(Brazil) Athletico Paranaense		26 February 2026	
MF	(Brazil) Léo Chú	(Portugal) Alverca	Loan	1 March 2026	
MF	(Brazil) Jota	(Brazil) Bahia		3 March 2026	
MF	(Brazil) Bruninho	(Brazil) Santa Catarina Clube	Loan	13 March 2026	
MF	(Brazil) Pedro Oliveira	(Brazil) Tombense	Loan	13 March 2026	
FW	(Nigeria) Samuel Otusanya	(Brazil) Criciúma	Loan	14 March 2026	
DF	(Brazil) Marcelo Henrique	(Brazil) Cuiabá	Loan	23 March 2026	
GK	(Brazil) Luan Polli	Unattached		25 March 2026	

== Competitions ==
=== Campeonato Brasileiro Série B ===
Pos	Team	Pld	W	D	L	GF	GA	GD	Pts
9	Goiás	22	9	5	8	22	27	−5	32
10	Atlético Goianiense	22	8	8	6	24	23	+1	32
11	Athletic	21	7	10	4	21	18	+3	31
12	São Bernardo	22	8	6	8	31	25	+6	30
13	Botafogo-SP	22	8	6	8	27	22	+5	30

Updated to match(es) played on 15 August 2026. Source: CBF
Rules for classification: 1) points; 2) wins; 3) goal difference; 4) goals scored; 5) head-to-head results (only between 2 teams); 6) fewest red cards; 7) fewest yellow cards; 8) drawing of lots.

==== Results by round ====
Round	1	2	3	4	5	6	7	8	9	10	11
Ground	H	A	H	A	A	H	A	H	H	A	H
Result	W	D	D	W	L	L	D	D	D	W	
Position	-	-	-	-	-	-	13				

Updated to match(es) played on 17 May 2026. Source:
A = Away; H = Home; W = Win; D = Draw; L = Loss

==== Matches ====
22 March 2026 1	Athletic	2–1	Ponte Preta
18:00

1 April 2026 2	Criciúma	1–1	Athletic
21:30

5 April 2026 3	Athletic	1–1	América Mineiro
20:00

12 April 2026 4	CRB	2–3	Athletic
20:00

19 April 2026 5	Novorizontino	2–1	Athletic
20:00

27 April 2026 6	Athletic	0–1	Náutico	São João del-Rei
19:00				Stadium: Estádio Joaquim Portugal; Referee: Lucas Paulo Torezin

4 May 2026 7	Vila Nova	1–1	Athletic	Goiânia
19:00	Hayner (yellow card) 45+1'; Dellatorre 70'; Janderson (yellow card) 80'		Douglas (yellow card) 23'; Ian Luccas (red card) 53'; F. Vieira (yellow card) 79'; Bruninho 87', (yellow card) 88'	Stadium: Estádio Onésio Brasileiro Alvarenga; Referee: Marcelo de Lima Henrique

9 May 2026 8	Athletic	0–0	Cuiabá	São João del-Rei
18:00				Stadium: Estádio Joaquim Portugal; Referee: Yuri Elino Ferreira da Cruz

17 May 2026 9	Athletic	1–1	Juventude	São João del-Rei
18:00				Stadium: Estádio Joaquim Portugal; Referee: João Vitor Gobi

25 May 2026 10	Botafogo-SP	1–2	Athletic	Ribeirão Preto
19:00				Stadium: Estádio Santa Cruz; Referee: Bruno Pereira Vasconcelos

30 May 2026 11	Athletic	1–0	Fortaleza	São João del-Rei
18:00				Stadium: Estádio Joaquim Portugal

10 June 2026 12	Sport	1–1	Athletic

14 June 2026 13	Athletic	1–1	Goiás

20 June 2026 14	Londrina	2–0	Athletic

28 June 2026 15	Athletic	1–0	Avaí

7 July 2026 16	Athletic	0–1	Operário Ferroviário

13 July 2026 17	Ceará	0–0	Athletic

18 July 2026 18	Atlético Goianiense	0–0	Athletic

23 July 2026 19	Athletic	2–1	São Bernardo

28 July 2026 20	Ponte Preta	1–1	Athletic

9 August 2026 21	Athletic	2–0	Criciúma
11:00	Pedro Oliveira 5'; Aponzá 55'

16 August 2026 22	América Mineiro	v	Athletic	Belo Horizonte
18:30				Stadium: Arena Independência; Referee: Wagner do Nascimento Magalhaes

=== Campeonato Mineiro ===
==== First phase ====
Group C

==== Results by round ====
Round	1	2	3	4	5	6	7	8
Ground	A	H	A	A	H	H	A	H
Result	L	L	D	W	D	L	D	D
Position								

A = Away; H = Home; W = Win; D = Draw; L = Loss

11 January 2026 1	América Mineiro	3–0	Athletic
19:30

14 January 2026 2	Athletic	0–1	URT
19:00

17 January 2026 3	Democrata	0–0	Athletic
18:00

21 January 2026 4	Pouso Alegre	3–4	Athletic
19:00

25 January 2026 5	Athletic	1–1	Betim
20:00

31 January 2026 6	Athletic	0–3	Uberlândia
18:30

7 February 2026 7	Atlético Mineiro	1–1	Athletic
18:30

14 February 2026 8	Athletic	1–1	Tombense
19:00

=== Copa do Brasil ===
==== Third round ====
4 March 2026	Rio Branco-ES	1–1 (5–6 p)	Athletic

==== Third round ====
11 March 2026	Athletic	2–0	Ypiranga
19:30

==== Fourth round ====
17 March 2026	Sport	1–3	Athletic
21:30

==== Fifth round ====
22 April 2026 First leg	Athletic	1–2	Internacional
21:30

12 May 2026	Internacional	3–2	Athletic
