= Pedro Oliveira =

Pedro Oliveira may refer to:

- Pedro Costa de Oliveira (1896–????), Brazilian serial killer
- Pedro Oliveira (academic) (born 1971), Portuguese innovation scholar
- Pedro Oliveira (footballer, born 1981), Portuguese footballer
- Pedro Oliveira (swimmer) (born 1988), Portuguese swimmer
- Pedro Henrique Oliveira (born 1992), East Timorese footballer
- Pedro Oliveira (footballer, born 1994), Portuguese footballer
- Pedro Oliveira (footballer, born 1998), Brazilian footballer
- Pedro Oliveira (photographer) (born 1989), American photographer
- Pedro M. Oliveira (1882–1958), Peruvian politician
- Pedro Oliveira (handballer) (born 2002), Portuguese handballer

== See also ==
- São Pedro de Oliveira, a Portuguese parish
