= Fernando (footballer, born 2005) =

Brazilian footballer (born 2005)

Personal information
- Full name: Luis Fernando Santos Oliveira
- Date of birth: 12 April 2005 (age 21)
- Place of birth: São Bernardo do Campo, Brazil
- Height: 1.75 m (5 ft 9 in)
- Positions: Winger; forward

Team information
- Current team: Santa Clara
- Number: 7

Youth career
- 2019–2021: EC São Bernardo
- 2021: Palmeiras
- 2022–2023: Água Santa
- 2022–2023: → Cruzeiro (loan)
- 2023–2026: Cruzeiro

Senior career*
Years	Team	Apps	(Gls)
2023	Água Santa	0	(0)
2023	→ Cruzeiro (loan)	1	(0)
2023–2026	Cruzeiro	5	(0)
2024	→ Ferroviária (loan)	12	(1)
2025	→ Maringá (loan)	4	(1)
2026–	Santa Clara	17	(2)
- * Club domestic league appearances and goals as of 20:02, 20 September 2026 (UTC)

Luis Fernando Santos Oliveira (born 12 April 2005), known as Luis Fernando or just Fernando, is a Brazilian professional footballer who plays as a winger or forward for Primeira Liga club Santa Clara.

== Career ==
Fernando began his career with EC São Bernardo, and had a brief stint at Palmeiras before playing for Água Santa. On 16 August 2022, he was loaned to Cruzeiro, being initially assigned to the under-17 squad.

During the 2023 season, Fernando impressed with Cruzeiro's under-20 team, scoring in a regular basis. He made his professional – and Série A – debut on 19 October 2023, coming on as a late substitute for Bruno Rodrigues in a 2–0 home loss to Flamengo.

On 21 November 2023, Cruzeiro announced the purchase of 50% of Fernando's rights, with the player signing a contract until 2026.

On 2 February 2026, Fernando moved to Portugal, joining Primeira Liga club Santa Clara on a contract until June 2029.

== Career statistics ==
As of 20 September 2026

Appearances and goals by club, season and competition
Club	Season	League			State league		Cup		Continental		Other		Total	
Club	Season	Division	Apps	Goals	Apps	Goals	Apps	Goals	Apps	Goals	Apps	Goals	Apps	Goals
Cruzeiro	2023	Série A	1	0	—		—		—		—		1	0
Cruzeiro	2024	Série A	0	0	3	0	—		—		—		3	0
Cruzeiro	2025	Série A	0	0	—		—		—		—		0	0
Cruzeiro	2026	Série A	0	0	2	0	0	0	0	0	—		2	0
Cruzeiro	Total		1	0	5	0	0	0	0	0	—		6	0
Ferroviária (loan)	2024	Série C	11	1	1	0	—		—		—		12	1
Maringá (loan)	2025	Série C	2	1	2	0	1	0	—		—		5	1
Santa Clara	2025–26	Primeira Liga	10	1	—		—		—		—		10	1
Santa Clara	2026–27	Primeira Liga	7	1	—		0	0	—		0	0	7	1
Santa Clara	Total		17	2	—		0	0	0	0	—		17	2
Career total			31	4	8	0	1	0	0	0	0	0	40	4
