= Rayan Lelis =

Brazilian footballer (born 2007)

Personal information
- Full name: Rayan Passaglia Lelis
- Date of birth: 19 January 2007 (age 19)
- Place of birth: Goiânia, Brazil
- Position: Forward

Team information
- Current team: Cruzeiro
- Number: 57

Youth career
- Athletico Paranaense
- 2023–: Cruzeiro

Senior career*
Years	Team	Apps	(Gls)
2025–	Cruzeiro	1	(0)
- * Club domestic league appearances and goals as of 13:40, 9 December 2025 (UTC)

Rayan Passaglia Lelis (born 19 January 2007), known as Rayan Lelis or just Rayan, is a Brazilian footballer who plays as a forward for Cruzeiro.

== Career ==
Born in Goiânia, Goiás, Rayan joined Cruzeiro's youth setup in 2023, from Athletico Paranaense. On 14 October 2025, he renewed his contract until 2029, and was promoted to the first team shortly after.

Rayan made his professional – and Série A – debut on 7 December 2025, starting in a 3–0 away loss to Santos.

== Career statistics ==
As of 9 December 2025

Club	Season	League			State League		Cup		Continental		Other		Total	
Club	Season	Division	Apps	Goals	Apps	Goals	Apps	Goals	Apps	Goals	Apps	Goals	Apps	Goals
Cruzeiro	2025	Série A	1	0	—		0	0	—		—		1	0
Career total			1	0	0	0	0	0	0	0	0	0	1	0
