= Tevis Gabriel =

Brazilian footballer (born 2006)

Tevis
Personal information
- Full name: Tevis Gabriel Alves Santos
- Date of birth: 28 January 2006 (age 20)
- Place of birth: Barreiros, Brazil
- Height: 1.84 m (6 ft 0 in)
- Position: Forward

Team information
- Current team: Yokohama F. Marinos (on loan from Cruzeiro)
- Number: 19

Youth career
- 2021–2024: Retrô
- 2023–2024: → Cruzeiro (loan)
- 2024–: Cruzeiro

Senior career*
Years	Team	Apps	(Gls)
2024–	Cruzeiro	8	(1)
2025	→ Athletico Paranaense (loan)	15	(1)
2026–	→ Yokohama F. Marinos (loan)	14	(1)
- * Club domestic league appearances and goals as of 11 August 2026

Tevis Gabriel Alves Santos (born 28 January 2006), known as Tevis Gabriel or just Tevis, is a Brazilian footballer who plays as a forward for Yokohama F.Marinos, on loan from Cruzeiro.

== Career ==
Tevis was born in Barreiros, Pernambuco, and had an unsuccessful trial at Cruzeiro in 2021. In December 2022, after impressing with Retrô, he returned to the club and was signed on loan.

In March 2024, Tevis signed a permanent contract with Cruzeiro until the end of 2026. He made his first team – and Série A – debut on 3 October of that year, coming on as a second-half substitute for Gabriel Veron in a 1–0 away loss to Fluminense.

== Career statistics ==
As of 23 October 2024

Club	Season	League			State League		Cup		Continental		Other		Total	
Club	Season	Division	Apps	Goals	Apps	Goals	Apps	Goals	Apps	Goals	Apps	Goals	Apps	Goals
Cruzeiro	2024	Série A	5	1	—		0	0	0	0	—		5	1
Cruzeiro	2025	Mineiro	2	0	—		0	0	0	0	—		2	0
Career total			7	0	0	0	0	0	0	0	0	0	7	1
