= Ryan Guilherme =

Brazilian footballer (born 2002)

Personal information
- Full name: Ryan Guilherme da Silva Pae
- Date of birth: 7 December 2002 (age 23)
- Place of birth: Rio de Janeiro, Brazil
- Height: 1.88 m (6 ft 2 in)
- Position: Midfielder

Team information
- Current team: Rio Ave
- Number: 8

Youth career
- Boavista
- 2021–2023: Fortaleza

Senior career*
Years	Team	Apps	(Gls)
2021	Boavista	3	(0)
2022–2025	Fortaleza	0	(0)
2022	→ Boavista (loan)	5	(1)
2023	→ Boavista (loan)	7	(0)
2023	→ Operário Ferroviário (loan)	4	(0)
2024	→ Boavista (loan)	14	(1)
2024	→ Volta Redonda (loan)	8	(0)
2024–2025	→ União Leiria (loan)	27	(1)
2025–2026	Cruzeiro	6	(0)
2026–	Rio Ave	12	(0)
- * Club domestic league appearances and goals as of 25 May 2026

Ryan Guilherme da Silva Pae (born 7 December 2002), known as Ryan Guilherme, is a Brazilian professional footballer who plays as a midfielder for Primeira Liga club Rio Ave.

== Career ==
A Boavista youth graduate, Ryan Guilherme made his first team debut in 2021 before moving to Fortaleza on 8 July 2021, initially for the under-20 team. In 2022, however, he returned to his previous club on loan.

Back to Fortaleza in May 2022, Ryan Guilherme again played with the under-20 squad before rejoining Boavista on another loan spell for the 2023 Campeonato Carioca. On 17 April 2023, he was announced at Operário Ferroviário also in a temporary deal.

On 11 January 2024, Ryan Guilherme returned to Boavista again on loan. On 5 April, he was announced at Volta Redonda also on loan, but only played eight matches before leaving for Liga Portugal 2 side União de Leiria on 5 July, also on loan.

On 2 August 2025, Fortaleza announced Ryan Guilherme's loan to Belgian side Royal Antwerp, but the deal later collapsed. On 2 September, he moved to Cruzeiro on a contract until December 2029.

On 1 February 2026, Ryan Guilherme joined Primeira Liga club Rio Ave on a contract until June 2030, for a reported fee of €1.8 million.

== Career statistics ==
As of 16 September 2025

Appearances and goals by club, season and competition
Club	Season	League			State league		Cup		Continental		Other		Total	
Club	Season	Division	Apps	Goals	Apps	Goals	Apps	Goals	Apps	Goals	Apps	Goals	Apps	Goals
Boavista	2021	Série D	2	0	1	0	2	0	—		—		5	0
Fortaleza	2021	Série A	0	0	—		2	1	—		—		0	0
Boavista (loan)	2022	Carioca	—		5	1	—		—		—		5	1
Boavista (loan)	2023	Carioca	—		7	0	—		—		—		7	0
Operário Ferroviário (loan)	2023	Série C	4	0	—		—		—		—		4	0
Boavista (loan)	2024	Carioca	—		14	1	—		—		—		14	1
Volta Redonda (loan)	2024	Série C	8	0	—		—		—		—		8	0
União de Leiria (loan)	2024–25	Liga Portugal 2	27	1	—		2	0	—		—		29	1
Cruzeiro	2025	Série A	0	0	—		0	0	—		—		0	0
Career total			41	1	27	2	6	1	0	0	0	0	74	4
