= Arthur Viana =

Brazilian footballer

Personal information
- Full name: Arthur Rodrigues Viana
- Date of birth: 12 April 2004 (age 22)
- Place of birth: Gravataí, Brazil
- Height: 1.80 m (5 ft 11 in)
- Position: Forward

Team information
- Current team: Feirense
- Number: 7

Youth career
- 2014–2023: Grêmio
- 2023–2024: Cruzeiro

Senior career*
Years	Team	Apps	(Gls)
2024–2026	Cruzeiro	3	(0)
2025	→ Ehime (loan)	5	(0)
2026	Caxias	0	(0)
2026–	Feirense	5	(0)
- * Club domestic league appearances and goals as of 13 September 2026

Arthur Rodrigues Viana (born 12 April 2004), known as Arthur Viana, is a Brazilian footballer who plays as a forward for Liga Portugal 2 club Feirense.

== Career ==
Born in Gravataí, Rio Grande do Sul, Arthur Viana played for ten years in the youth sides of Grêmio before signing for Cruzeiro in August 2023. On 6 June of the following year, he renewed his contract with the former until December 2026.

Arthur Viana made his first team – and Série A – debut on 16 June 2024, coming on as a half-time substitute for injured Rafa Silva in a 0–0 away draw against Vasco da Gama.

== Career statistics ==
As of 17 June 2024

Club	Season	League			State League		Cup		Continental		Other		Total	
Club	Season	Division	Apps	Goals	Apps	Goals	Apps	Goals	Apps	Goals	Apps	Goals	Apps	Goals
Cruzeiro	2024	Série A	1	0	0	0	0	0	0	0	—		1	0
Career total			1	0	0	0	0	0	0	0	0	0	1	0
