= Janderson (footballer, born 2005) =

Brazilian footballer (born 2005)

Personal information
- Full name: José Janderson da Silva Marques
- Date of birth: 31 August 2005 (age 21)
- Place of birth: Altos, Brazil
- Height: 1.89 m (6 ft 2 in)
- Position: Centre-back

Team information
- Current team: Moreirense
- Number: 32

Youth career
- 2021–2025: Fluminense-PI
- 2024–2025: → Cruzeiro (loan)
- 2025–2026: Cruzeiro

Senior career*
Years	Team	Apps	(Gls)
2023–2024	Fluminense-PI	2	(0)
2025–2026	Cruzeiro	1	(0)
2026–	Moreirense	0	(0)
- * Club domestic league appearances and goals as of 9 September 2026

José Janderson da Silva Marques (born 31 August 2005), commonly known as Janderson, is a Brazilian footballer who plays for Primeira Liga club Moreirense. Mainly a centre-back, he can also play as a defensive midfielder.

== Career ==
Born in Altos, Piauí, Janderson joined Fluminense-PI's youth sides in 2021. He made his first team debut in 2023, he was linked to a move to Corinthians in December of that year, but the deal fell through.

On 19 March 2024, Janderson was loaned to Cruzeiro and was assigned to the under-20 team. On 4 February of the following year, he was bought outright by the club, signing a three-year contract.

Janderson made his Série A debut on 27 April 2025, coming on as a late substitute for Fagner in a 1–0 home win over Vasco da Gama.

On 2 July 2026, Janderson signed a five-year contract with Portuguese club Moreirense.

== Career statistics ==
As of 30 April 2025

Club	Season	League			State League		Cup		Continental		Other		Total	
Club	Season	Division	Apps	Goals	Apps	Goals	Apps	Goals	Apps	Goals	Apps	Goals	Apps	Goals
Fluminense-PI	2023	Série D	2	0	0	0	—		—		3 (Note: Appearance(s) in Copa do Nordeste)	0	5	0
Cruzeiro	2025	Série A	1	0	0	0	0	0	0	0	—		1	0
Career total			3	0	0	0	0	0	0	0	3	0	6	0
