= 2024 Cruzeiro EC season =

Cruzeiro
2024 season
- Owner: Ronaldo (until 29 April); Pedro Lourenço (from 29 April)
- President: Lidson Potsch
- Manager: Nicolás Larcamón (until 8 April) Fernando Seabra (9 April to 23 September) Fernando Diniz (from 23 September)
- Stadium: Mineirão
- Série A: 9th
- Campeonato Mineiro: Runners-up
- Copa do Brasil: First round
- Copa Sudamericana: Runners-up
| Home colors | Away colors | Third colors |

The 2024 season was the 104th in the Cruzeiro Esporte Clube's existence.

Along with the Campeonato Brasileiro Série A, the club also competed in the Campeonato Mineiro, in the Copa do Brasil and in the Copa Sudamericana.

== Current squad ==
As of 8 September 2024

Note: Flags indicate national team as defined under FIFA eligibility rules; some limited exceptions apply. Players may hold more than one non-FIFA nationality.

| No. | Pos. | Nation | Player |
|---|---|---|---|
| 1 | GK | BRA | Cássio |
| 2 | DF | BRA | Wesley Gasolina |
| 3 | DF | BRA | Marlon Xavier |
| 5 | DF | BRA | Zé Ivaldo |
| 6 | DF | BRA | Kaiki Bruno |
| 7 | MF | BRA | Mateus Vital |
| 8 | FW | BRA | Rafa Silva |
| 9 | FW | BRA | Kaio Jorge |
| 10 | MF | BRA | Matheus Pereira |
| 12 | DF | BRA | William |
| 16 | MF | BRA | Lucas Silva |
| 17 | MF | BRA | Ramiro |
| 19 | FW | ARG | Juan Dinenno |
| 20 | MF | BRA | Walace |
| 21 | FW | ARG | Álvaro Barreal (on loan from Cincinnati) |
| 22 | MF | BRA | Vitinho |
| 25 | DF | ARG | Lucas Villalba (on loan from Argentinos Juniors) |

| No. | Pos. | Nation | Player |
|---|---|---|---|
| 26 | FW | ARG | Lautaro Díaz |
| 29 | MF | ARG | Lucas Romero |
| 30 | FW | BRA | Gabriel Veron (on loan from Porto) |
| 33 | MF | PAR | Fabrizio Peralta |
| 34 | DF | BRA | Jonathan Jesus |
| 35 | DF | BRA | Pedrão |
| 41 | GK | BRA | Léo Aragão |
| 43 | DF | BRA | João Marcelo |
| 44 | DF | BRA | Weverton |
| 52 | DF | BRA | Dorival |
| 58 | MF | BRA | Jhosefer |
| 66 | FW | BRA | Tevis |
| 69 | FW | BRA | Kaique Kenji |
| 77 | MF | BRA | Japa |
| 81 | GK | BRA | Gabriel Grando (on loan from Grêmio) |
| 97 | MF | BRA | Matheus Henrique |
| 98 | GK | BRA | Anderson |

=== Other players ===
Note: Flags indicate national team as defined under FIFA eligibility rules; some limited exceptions apply. Players may hold more than one non-FIFA nationality.

| No. | Pos. | Nation | Player |
|---|---|---|---|
| 15 | MF | BRA | Fernando Henrique |

=== Out on loan ===
Note: Flags indicate national team as defined under FIFA eligibility rules; some limited exceptions apply. Players may hold more than one non-FIFA nationality.

| No. | Pos. | Nation | Player |
|---|---|---|---|
| — | GK | BRA | Rafael Cabral (at Grêmio until 31 December 2024) |
| — | GK | BRA | Rodrigo Bazilio (at Joinville until 30 November 2024) |
| — | DF | COL | Helibelton Palacios (at Sport Recife until 31 December 2024) |
| — | DF | BRA | Lucas Oliveira (at Kyoto Sanga until 31 December 2024) |
| — | MF | BRA | Henrique Rodrigues (at Figueirense until 30 November 2024) |
| — | MF | BRA | Ian Luccas (at Goiás until 30 November 2024) |

| No. | Pos. | Nation | Player |
|---|---|---|---|
| — | MF | BRA | Neto Moura (at Mirassol until 30 November 2024) |
| — | FW | BRA | Fernando (at Ferroviária until 30 October 2024) |
| — | FW | BRA | João Pedro (at Mirassol until 30 April 2025) |
| — | FW | BRA | Matheus Davó (at América-MG until 30 November 2024) |
| — | FW | BRA | Rafael Elias (at Kyoto Sanga until 31 December 2024) |
| — | FW | BRA | Robert (at Copenhagen until 31 August 2025) |

=== First-team staff ===
| Position | Name | Nationality |
|---|---|---|
| Head coach | Fernando Diniz | BRA |
| Assistant coach | Wesley Carvalho | BRA |
| Goalkeeping coach | João Paulo Lacerda | BRA |
| Goalkeeping coach | Robertinho | BRA |
| Fitness coaches | Leonardo Almeida | BRA |
| Fitness coaches | Nathália Arnosti | BRA |
| Fitness coaches | Túlio Flôres | BRA |
| Performance analyst | Gabriel Eloi | BRA |
| Performance analyst | Henrique Américo | BRA |

== Competitions ==
=== Overview ===
| Competition | First match | Last match | Starting round | Final position | Record | | | | | | | |
| Competition | First match | Last match | Starting round | Final position | Pld | W | D | L | GF | GA | GD | Win % |
|---|---|---|---|---|---|---|---|---|---|---|---|---|
| Campeonato Mineiro | 24 January | 7 April | First stage | Runners-up | 12 | 7 | 3 | 2 | 21 | 11 | +10 | 58.33 |
| Copa do Brasil | 21 February | | First round | First round | 1 | 0 | 0 | 1 | 0 | 2 | −2 | 0.00 |
| Copa Sudamericana | 4 April | 23 November | Group stage | Runners-up | 13 | 6 | 5 | 2 | 16 | 10 | +6 | 46.15 |
| Campeonato Brasileiro Série A | 14 April | 8 December | Matchday 1 | 9th | 38 | 14 | 10 | 14 | 43 | 41 | +2 | 36.84 |
| Total | | | | | 64 | 27 | 18 | 19 | 80 | 64 | +16 | 42.19 |

Source: Competitions

=== Campeonato Mineiro ===
==== First stage ====
| Pos | Team | Pld | W | D | L | GF | GA | GD | Pts | Qualification or relegation |
|---|---|---|---|---|---|---|---|---|---|---|
| 1 | Cruzeiro | 8 | 6 | 1 | 1 | 15 | 5 | +10 | 19 | Knockout stage |
| 2 | Tombense | 8 | 4 | 3 | 1 | 15 | 7 | +8 | 15 | Knockout stage |
| 3 | Itabirito | 8 | 2 | 2 | 4 | 8 | 12 | −4 | 8 | |
| 4 | Ipatinga | 8 | 2 | 1 | 5 | 9 | 17 | −8 | 7 | Relegation stage |

Source: FMF

| 24 January 1 | Villa Nova | 1–2 | Cruzeiro | Nova Lima |
| 19:00 UTC−3 | Wendson 45+1' | Report | Dinenno 29'; João Pedro 90+4' | Stadium: Castor Cifuentes; Attendance: 3,896; Referee: André Luiz Skettino Policarpo Bento |

| 27 January 2 | Cruzeiro | 1–1 | Athletic Club | Sete Lagoas |
| 16:30 UTC−3 | Wesley Gasolina 75' | Report | Jonathas de Jesus 55' (pen.) | Stadium: Arena do Jacaré; Attendance: 12,628; Referee: Vinícius Gomes do Amaral |

| 3 February 3 | Atlético Mineiro | 0–2 | Cruzeiro | Belo Horizonte |
| 19:30 UTC−3 | | Report | Zé Ivaldo 82'; João Pedro 86' | Stadium: Arena MRV; Attendance: 42,585; Referee: Paulo César Zanovelli da Silva |

| 9 February 4 | Cruzeiro | 3–0 | Patrocinense | Belo Horizonte |
| 16:30 UTC−3 | Marlon Xavier 39'; Dinenno 48'; Arthur Gomes 64' | Report | | Stadium: Mineirão; Attendance: 19,502; Referee: Daniel da Cunha Oliveira Filho |

| 15 February 5 | Cruzeiro | 0–2 | América Mineiro | Belo Horizonte |
| 20:00 UTC−3 | | Report | Renato Marques 61'; Rodrigo Varanda 87' | Stadium: Mineirão; Attendance: 39,086; Referee: André Luiz Skettino Policarpo Bento |

| 18 February 6 | Democrata-GV | 1–3 | Cruzeiro | Governador Valadares |
| 18:30 UTC−3 | Pedro Oliveira 15' | Report | Dinenno 7'; Zé Ivaldo 38'; Rafael Elias 90+6' | Stadium: Mamudão; Attendance: 8,523; Referee: Felipe Fernandes de Lima |

| 25 February 7 | Pouso Alegre | 0–2 | Cruzeiro | Uberlândia |
| 11:00 UTC−3 | | Report | Vinício 30' (o.g.); Dinenno 41' | Stadium: Estádio Parque do Sabiá; Attendance: 4,968; Referee: Ronei Cândido Alves |

| 2 March 8 | Cruzeiro | 2–0 | Uberlândia | Belo Horizonte |
| 16:30 UTC−3 | Jamerson 33' (o.g.); Rafael Elias 90+5' | Report | | Stadium: Mineirão; Attendance: 32,868; Referee: Andreza Helena de Siqueira |

==== Knockout stage ====
===== Semi-finals =====
| 10 March First leg | Tombense | 0–0 | Cruzeiro | Ipatinga |
| 19:30 UTC−3 | | Report | | Stadium: Ipatingão; Attendance: 21,261; Referee: Paulo César Zanovelli da Silva |

| 16 March Second leg | Cruzeiro | 3–1 (3–1 agg.) | Tombense | Belo Horizonte |
| 16:30 UTC−3 | Arthur Gomes 35'; Zé Vitor 69' (o.g.); Matheus Pereira 90+2' | Report | Zé Vitor 79' | Stadium: Mineirão; Attendance: 40,158; Referee: Felipe Fernandes de Lima |

===== Finals =====
| 30 March First leg | Atlético Mineiro | 2–2 | Cruzeiro | Belo Horizonte |
| 16:30 UTC−3 | Bruno Fuchs 8'; Hulk 26' | Report | Jemerson 49' (o.g.); Dinenno 90+5' | Stadium: Arena MRV; Attendance: 42,590; Referee: Felipe Fernandes de Lima |

| 7 April Second leg | Cruzeiro | 1–3 (3–5 agg.) | Atlético Mineiro | Belo Horizonte |
| 15:30 UTC−3 | Mateus Vital 52' | Report | Saravia 65'; Hulk 77' (pen.); Gustavo Scarpa 90+3' | Stadium: Mineirão; Attendance: 61,582; Referee: Flávio Rodrigues de Souza |

=== Campeonato Brasileiro Série A ===
==== League table ====
| Pos | Team | Pld | W | D | L | GF | GA | GD | Pts | Qualification or relegation |
|---|---|---|---|---|---|---|---|---|---|---|
| 7 | Corinthians | 38 | 15 | 11 | 12 | 54 | 45 | +9 | 56 | Qualification for Copa Libertadores second stage |
| 8 | Bahia | 38 | 15 | 8 | 15 | 49 | 49 | 0 | 53 | Qualification for Copa Libertadores second stage |
| 9 | Cruzeiro | 38 | 14 | 10 | 14 | 43 | 41 | +2 | 52 | Qualification for Copa Sudamericana group stage |
| 10 | Vasco da Gama | 38 | 14 | 8 | 16 | 43 | 56 | −13 | 50 | Qualification for Copa Sudamericana group stage |
| 11 | Vitória | 38 | 13 | 8 | 17 | 45 | 52 | −7 | 47 | Qualification for Copa Sudamericana group stage |

Source: CBF
Rules for classification: 1) points; 2) wins; 3) goal difference; 4) goals scored; 5) head-to-head results (only between two teams); 6) fewest red cards; 7) fewest yellow cards; 8) drawing of lots.

==== Results by round ====
| Round | 1 | 2 | 3 | 4 | 5 | 6 | 7 | 8 | 9 | 10 | 11 | 12 | 13 | 14 | 15 | 16 | 17 | 18 | 19 | 20 | 21 | 22 | 23 | 24 | 25 | 26 | 27 | 28 | 29 | 30 | 31 | 32 | 33 | 34 | 35 | 36 | 37 | 38 |
|---|---|---|---|---|---|---|---|---|---|---|---|---|---|---|---|---|---|---|---|---|---|---|---|---|---|---|---|---|---|---|---|---|---|---|---|---|---|---|
| Ground | H | A | A | H | H | A | A | H | A | H | A | H | A | A | H | A | H | A | H | A | H | H | A | A | H | H | A | H | A | H | A | H | H | A | H | A | H | A |
| Result | W | D | L | W | D | W | L | W | D | W | L | W | L | L | W | W | W | L | W | W | L | D | D | L | W | L | D | D | L | D | L | L | W | L | D | D | L | W |
| Position | 2 | 5 | 12 | 7 | 7 | 6 | 9 | 7 | 8 | 6 | 8 | 5 | 7 | 8 | 7 | 6 | 6 | 7 | 5 | 5 | 5 | 6 | 7 | 7 | 5 | 7 | 7 | 8 | 8 | 8 | 8 | 8 | 7 | 7 | 7 | 9 | 9 | 9 |

Source: Matches
A = Away; H = Home; W = Win; D = Draw; L = Loss; P = Postponed

==== Matches ====
| 14 April 1 | Cruzeiro | 3–2 | Botafogo | Belo Horizonte |
| 17:00 UTC−3 | Lucas Silva 20'; Rafael Silva 65'; Rafael Elias 90+1' | Report | Tiquinho Soares 5'; Danilo Barbosa 83' | Stadium: Mineirão; Attendance: 20,701; Referee: Matheus Delgado Candançan |

| 17 April 2 | Fortaleza | 1–1 | Cruzeiro | Fortaleza |
| 20:00 UTC−3 | Hércules 19' | Report | Mateus Vital 89' | Stadium: Castelão; Attendance: 22,131; Referee: Bruno Mota Correia |

| 20 April 3 | Atlético Mineiro | 3–0 | Cruzeiro | Belo Horizonte |
| 21:00 UTC−3 | Zaracho 25'; Paulinho 35'; Arana 45+2' | Report | | Stadium: Arena MRV; Attendance: 39,541; Referee: Ramon Abatti Abel |

| 28 April 4 | Cruzeiro | 3–1 | Vitória | Belo Horizonte |
| 16:00 UTC−3 | Matheus Pereira 50'; Rafael Silva 58'; Arthur Gomes 75' | Report | Lucas Silva 52' (o.g.) | Stadium: Mineirão; Attendance: 20,083; Referee: Fábio Augusto Santos Sá Júnior |

| 12 May 6 | Atlético Goianiense | 0–1 | Cruzeiro | Goiânia |
| 16:00 UTC−3 | | Report | Matheus Pereira 81' | Stadium: Antônio Accioly; Attendance: 7,576; Referee: Rodrigo José Pereira de Lima |

| 2 June 7 | São Paulo | 2–0 | Cruzeiro | São Paulo |
| 18:30 UTC−3 | Lucas Moura 5'; Calleri 48' | Report | | Stadium: Morumbi; Attendance: 44,928; Referee: Lucas Paulo Torezin |

| 13 June 8 | Cruzeiro | 2–1 | Cuiabá | Belo Horizonte |
| 19:00 UTC−3 | Matheus Pereira 45+1'; Rafael Silva 67' | Report | Isidro Pitta 64' (pen.) | Stadium: Mineirão; Attendance: 26,595; Referee: Marcelo de Lima Henrique |

| 16 June 9 | Vasco da Gama | 0–0 | Cruzeiro | Rio de Janeiro |
| 18:30 UTC−3 | | Report | | Stadium: São Januário; Attendance: 11,275; Referee: Rafael Rodrigo Klein |

| 19 June 10 | Cruzeiro | 2–0 | Fluminense | Belo Horizonte |
| 21:30 UTC−3 | William 41' (pen.), 90+3' | Report | | Stadium: Mineirão; Attendance: 28,812; Referee: Matheus Delgado Candançan |

| 23 June 11 | Bahia | 4–1 | Cruzeiro | Salvador |
| 16:00 UTC−3 | Thaciano 45+9'; Estupiñán 78', 90+7'; Biel 90+1' | Report | Gabriel Veron 14' | Stadium: Fonte Nova; Attendance: 35,541; Referee: Paulo Belence Alves dos Prazeres Filho |

| 26 June 12 | Cruzeiro | 2–0 | Athletico Paranaense | Belo Horizonte |
| 19:00 UTC−3 | Gabriel Veron 15'; Vitinho 90+1' | Report | | Stadium: Mineirão; Attendance: 26,465; Referee: Davi de Oliveira Lacerda |

| 30 June 13 | Flamengo | 2–1 | Cruzeiro | Rio de Janeiro |
| 18:30 UTC−3 | Pedro 16'; Fabrício Bruno 65' | Report | Matheus Pereira 38' | Stadium: Maracanã; Attendance: 56,263; Referee: Bráulio da Silva Machado |

| 3 July 14 | Criciúma | 1–0 | Cruzeiro | Criciúma |
| 20:00 UTC−3 | Bolasie 46' | Report | | Stadium: Heriberto Hülse; Attendance: 12,352; Referee: João Vitor Gobi |

| 7 July 15 | Cruzeiro | 3–0 | Corinthians | Belo Horizonte |
| 16:00 UTC−3 | Matheus Pereira 6'; Barreal 45+5'; Gabriel Veron 48' | Report | | Stadium: Mineirão; Attendance: 55,186; Referee: Alex Gomes Stefano |

| 10 July 16 | Grêmio | 0–2 | Cruzeiro | Caxias do Sul |
| 18:30 UTC−3 | | Report | Ramiro 15'; Arthur Gomes 17' | Stadium: Estádio Centenário; Attendance: 4,713; Referee: Bruno Arleu de Araújo |

| 13 July 17 | Cruzeiro | 2–1 | Red Bull Bragantino | Belo Horizonte |
| 16:00 UTC−3 | Gabriel Veron 8'; Matheus Pereira 84' | Report | Thiago Borbas 90+5' | Stadium: Independência; Attendance: 20,042; Referee: Sávio Pereira Sampaio |

| 20 July 18 | Palmeiras | 2–0 | Cruzeiro | São Paulo |
| 21:00 UTC−3 | José López 36'; Gabriel Menino 90+2' | Report | | Stadium: Allianz Parque; Attendance: 40,465; Referee: Davi de Oliveira Lacerda |

| 24 July 19 | Cruzeiro | 2–0 | Juventude | Belo Horizonte |
| 20:00 UTC−3 | William 45' (pen.); Dinenno 87' (pen.) | Report | | Stadium: Mineirão; Attendance: 46,603; Referee: Maguielson Lima Barbosa |

| 27 July 20 | Botafogo | 0–3 | Cruzeiro | Rio de Janeiro |
| 21:30 UTC−3 | | Report | William 13'; Lautaro Díaz 37'; Barreal 77' | Stadium: Nilton Santos; Attendance: 19,349; Referee: Wilton Pereira Sampaio |

| 5 August 21 | Cruzeiro | 1–2 | Fortaleza | Cariacica |
| 21:00 UTC−3 | Matheus Pereira 15' | Report | Breno Lopes 9'; Renato Kayzer 42' | Stadium: Estádio Kléber Andrade; Attendance: 9,666; Referee: Alex Gomes Stefano |

| 10 August 22 | Cruzeiro | 0–0 | Atlético Mineiro | Belo Horizonte |
| 21:30 UTC−3 | | Report | | Stadium: Mineirão; Attendance: 61,583; Referee: Raphael Claus |

| 18 August 23 | Vitória | 2–2 | Cruzeiro | Salvador |
| 20:00 UTC−3 | Osvaldo 25' (pen.); Alerrandro 38' | Report | Dinenno 78', 84' | Stadium: Barradão; Attendance: 17,062; Referee: Marcelo de Lima Henrique |

| 25 August 24 | Internacional | 1–0 | Cruzeiro | Porto Alegre |
| 19:00 UTC−3 | Borré 70' | Report | | Stadium: Beira-Rio; Attendance: 26,634; Referee: Matheus Delgado Candançan |

| 28 August 5 | Cruzeiro | 0–0 | Internacional | Belo Horizonte |
| 19:30 UTC−3 | | Report | | Stadium: Mineirão; Attendance: 35,238; Referee: Bruno Arleu de Araújo |

| 1 September 25 | Cruzeiro | 3–1 | Atlético Goianiense | Belo Horizonte |
| 11:00 UTC−3 | William 9' (pen.); Matheus Henrique 25'; Kaio Jorge 56' | Report | Campbell 33' | Stadium: Mineirão; Attendance: 58,233; Referee: Gustavo Ervino Bauermann |

| 15 September 26 | Cruzeiro | 0–1 | São Paulo | Belo Horizonte |
| 18:30 UTC−3 | | Report | William Gomes 59' | Stadium: Mineirão; Attendance: 44,743; Referee: Wilton Pereira Sampaio |

| 22 September 27 | Cuiabá | 0–0 | Cruzeiro | Cuiabá |
| 18:30 UTC−3 | | Report | | Stadium: Arena Pantanal; Attendance: 5,948; Referee: Flávio Rodrigues de Souza |

| 29 September 28 | Cruzeiro | 1–1 | Vasco da Gama | Belo Horizonte |
| 18:30 UTC−3 | Zé Ivaldo 59' | Report | Vegetti 41' | Stadium: Mineirão; Attendance: 36,817; Referee: Matheus Delgado Candançan |

| 3 October 29 | Fluminense | 1–0 | Cruzeiro | Rio de Janeiro |
| 21:30 UTC−3 | Arias 55' | Report | | Stadium: Maracanã; Attendance: 19,352; Referee: Gustavo Ervino Bauermann |

| 18 October 30 | Cruzeiro | 1–1 | Bahia | Belo Horizonte |
| 21:30 UTC−3 | Gabriel Veron 61' | Report | Luciano Rodríguez 82' | Stadium: Mineirão; Attendance: 34,473; Referee: Flávio Rodrigues de Souza |

| 26 October 31 | Athletico Paranaense | 3–0 | Cruzeiro | Curitiba |
| 18:30 UTC−3 | Pablo 25'; Julimar 46'; Nikão 80' | Report | | Stadium: Arena da Baixada; Attendance: 35,959; Referee: Rodrigo José Pereira de Lima |

| 6 November 32 | Cruzeiro | 0–1 | Flamengo | Belo Horizonte |
| 21:00 UTC−3 | | Report | David Luiz 53' | Stadium: Independência; Attendance: 20,855; Referee: Gustavo Ervino Bauermann |

| 9 November 33 | Cruzeiro | 2–1 | Criciúma | Belo Horizonte |
| 19:00 UTC−3 | Kaio Jorge 9'; Gabriel Veron 69' | Report | Allano 82' | Stadium: Mineirão; Attendance: 29,287; Referee: Wagner do Nascimento Magalhães |

| 20 November 34 | Corinthians | 2–1 | Cruzeiro | São Paulo |
| 11:00 UTC−3 | Depay 11'; Yuri Alberto 16' | Report | Kaiki Bruno 34' | Stadium: Neo Química Arena; Attendance: 46,056; Referee: Jonathan Benkenstein Pinheiro |

| 27 November 35 | Cruzeiro | 1–1 | Grêmio | Belo Horizonte |
| 21:00 UTC−3 | Matheus Pereira 42' | Report | Braithwaite 19' | Stadium: Mineirão; Attendance: 21,009; Referee: Raphael Claus |

| 1 December 36 | Red Bull Bragantino | 1–1 | Cruzeiro | Bragança Paulista |
| 18:30 UTC−3 | Sasha 6' | Report | Ramiro 86' | Stadium: Nabi Abi Chedid; Attendance: 6,223; Referee: Rafael Rodrigo Klein |

| 4 December 37 | Cruzeiro | 1–2 | Palmeiras | Belo Horizonte |
| 21:30 UTC−3 | Matheus Pereira 52' | Report | Maurício 61'; Estêvão 90' | Stadium: Mineirão; Attendance: 0 Referee: Anderson Daronco |

| 8 December 38 | Juventude | 0–1 | Cruzeiro | Caxias do Sul |
| 16:00 UTC−3 | | Report | Tevis 30' | Stadium: Alfredo Jaconi; Attendance: 13,518; Referee: Edina Alves Batista |

=== Copa Sudamericana ===
| Pos | Team | Pld | W | D | L | GF | GA | GD | Pts | Qualification | CRU | UCA | ALI | ULC |
|---|---|---|---|---|---|---|---|---|---|---|---|---|---|---|
| 1 | (Brazil) Cruzeiro | 6 | 3 | 3 | 0 | 8 | 3 | +5 | 12 | Advance to round of 16 | — | 1–0 | 3–3 | 1–0 |
| 2 | (Ecuador) Universidad Católica | 6 | 3 | 2 | 1 | 8 | 2 | +6 | 11 | Advance to knockout round play-offs | 0–0 | — | 0–0 | 4–0 |
| 3 | (Colombia) Alianza | 6 | 1 | 2 | 3 | 5 | 10 | −5 | 5 | | 0–3 | 1–3 | — | 0–1 |
| 4 | (Chile) Unión La Calera | 6 | 1 | 1 | 4 | 1 | 7 | −6 | 4 | | 0–0 | 0–1 | 0–1 | — |

Source: CONMEBOL
Rules for classification: 1) Points; 2) Goal difference; 3) Goals scored; 4) Away goals scored; 5) CONMEBOL ranking.

| 4 April 1 | Universidad Católica (Ecuador) | 0–0 | (Brazil) Cruzeiro | Quito, Ecuador |
| 21:00 UTC−3 | | Report | | Stadium: Estadio Olímpico Atahualpa; Attendance: 3,092; Referee: Ángel Arteaga (Venezuela) |

| 11 April 2 | Cruzeiro (Brazil) | 3–3 | (Colombia) Alianza | Belo Horizonte, Brazil |
| 21:00 UTC−3 | Romero 7'; Zé Ivaldo 12'; Matheus Pereira 19' | Report | Batalla 53', 79'; Figueroa 90+6' | Stadium: Mineirão; Attendance: 18,818; Referee: Roberto Pérez (Peru) |

| 23 April 3 | Unión La Calera (Chile) | 0–0 | (Brazil) Cruzeiro | Viña del Mar, Chile |
| 19:00 UTC−3 | | Report | | Stadium: Estadio Sausalito; Attendance: 1,182; Referee: Mario Díaz de Vivar (Paraguay) |

| 7 May 4 | Alianza (Colombia) | 0–3 | (Brazil) Cruzeiro | Valledupar, Colombia |
| 21:30 UTC−3 | | Report | Lucas Silva 41'; Arthur Gomes 49'; Rafael Elias 90+3' | Stadium: Estadio Armando Maestre Pavajeau; Attendance: 3,068; Referee: Andrés Merlos (Argentina) |

| 16 May 5 | Cruzeiro (Brazil) | 1–0 | (Chile) Unión La Calera | Belo Horizonte, Brazil |
| 21:00 UTC−3 | Matheus Pereira 7' | Report | | Stadium: Independência; Attendance: 17,712; Referee: Ivo Méndez (Bolivia) |

| 30 May 6 | Cruzeiro (Brazil) | 1–0 | (Ecuador) Universidad Católica | Belo Horizonte, Brazil |
| 21:00 UTC−3 | Rafael Silva 80' | | | Stadium: Mineirão; Attendance: 55,254; Referee: Maximiliano Ramírez (Argentina) |

==== Knockout stage ====
===== Round of 16 =====
| 15 August First leg | Boca Juniors (Argentina) | 1–0 | (Brazil) Cruzeiro | Buenos Aires, Argentina |
| 21:30 UTC−3 | Cavani 65' | Report | | Stadium: La Bombonera; Attendance: 43,973; Referee: Jesús Valenzuela (Venezuela) |

| 22 August Second leg | Cruzeiro (Brazil) | 2–1 (2–2 agg.) (5–4 p) | (Argentina) Boca Juniors | Belo Horizonte, Brazil |
| 21:30 UTC−3 | Matheus Henrique 9'; Walace 21' | Report | Giménez 48' | Stadium: Mineirão; Attendance: 58,323; Referee: Wilmar Roldán (Colombia) |
| | Penalties |
| | William (penalty scored); Matheus Henrique (penalty scored); Marlon Xavier (penalty scored); Dinenno (penalty scored); Barreal (penalty scored) | | (penalty scored) Rojo; (penalty scored) Lema; (penalty scored) Blanco; (penalty scored) Figal; (penalty missed) Merentiel |

===== Quarter-finals =====
| 19 September First leg | Libertad (Paraguay) | 0–2 | (Brazil) Cruzeiro | Asunción, Paraguay |
| 21:30 UTC−3 | | Report | Kaio Jorge 19'; Lautaro Díaz 45+3' | Stadium: Estadio Defensores del Chaco; Referee: Gustavo Tejera (Uruguay) |

| 26 September Second leg | Cruzeiro (Brazil) | 1–1 (3–1 agg.) | (Paraguay) Libertad | Belo Horizonte, Brazil |
| 21:30 UTC−3 | Kaio Jorge 12' | Report | Santa Cruz 72' | Stadium: Mineirão; Attendance: 52,974; Referee: Felipe González (Chile) |

===== Semi-finals =====
| 23 October First leg | Cruzeiro (Brazil) | 1–1 | (Argentina) Lanús | Belo Horizonte, Brazil |
| 19:00 UTC−3 | Kaio Jorge 50' | Report | Carrera 73' | Stadium: Mineirão; Attendance: 57,158; Referee: Andrés Matonte (Uruguay) |

| 30 October Second leg | Lanús (Argentina) | 0–1 (1–2 agg.) | (Brazil) Cruzeiro | Lanús, Argentina |
| 19:00 UTC−3 | | Report | Kaio Jorge 45+1' | Stadium: Estadio Ciudad de Lanús; Attendance: 29,589; Referee: Juan Benítez (Paraguay) |

===== Final =====
| 23 November Final | Racing (Argentina) | 3–1 | (Brazil) Cruzeiro | Asunción, Paraguay |
| 17:00 UTC−3 | Martirena 15'; Adrián Martínez 20'; Roger Martínez 90+5' | Report | Kaio Jorge 52' | Stadium: Estadio General Pablo Rojas; Attendance: 43,828; Referee: Esteban Ostojich (Uruguay) |

=== Copa do Brasil ===
==== First round ====
| 21 February Single match | Sousa | 2–0 | Cruzeiro | Sousa |
| 19:15 UTC−3 | Danillo Bala 89', 90+5' | Report | | Stadium: Marizão; Attendance: 2,930; Referee: Rafael Rodrigo Klein |
