= João Pedro (footballer, born February 2003) =

Brazilian footballer (born 2003)

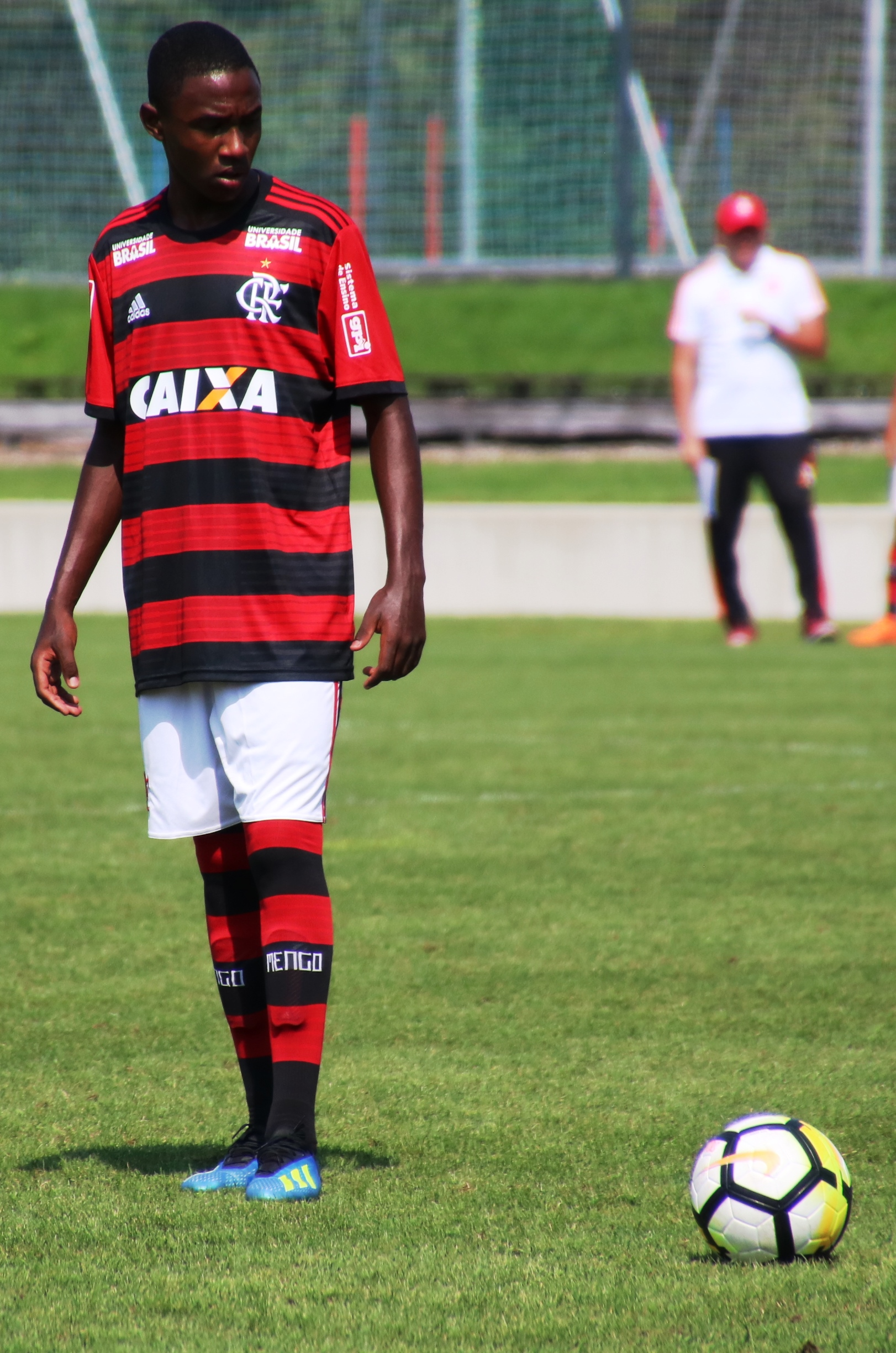
- João Pedro with the under-15 team of Flamengo in 2018

Personal information
- Full name: João Pedro da Cruz Oliveira
- Date of birth: 2 February 2003 (age 23)
- Place of birth: Paracambi, Brazil
- Height: 1.78 m (5 ft 10 in)
- Position: Forward

Team information
- Current team: Paços de Ferreira (on loan from Londrina)
- Number: 7

Youth career
- 2018–2022: Flamengo
- 2022: Valladolid
- 2023: Cruzeiro

Senior career*
Years	Team	Apps	(Gls)
2022–2023	Valladolid B	16	(0)
2023–2026	Cruzeiro	10	(2)
2024	→ Mirassol (loan)	5	(0)
2025	→ Tombense (loan)	20	(2)
2025	→ Volta Redonda (loan)	15	(0)
2026–	Londrina	7	(0)
2026	→ Confiança (loan)	17	(2)
2026	→ Paços de Ferreira (loan)	2	(1)
- * Club domestic league appearances and goals as of 13 September 2026

João Pedro da Cruz Oliveira (born 2 February 2003), known as João Pedro or Jotta, is a Brazilian footballer who plays as a forward for Portuguese Liga 3 club Paços de Ferreira on loan from Londrina.

== Career ==
Born in Paracambi, Rio de Janeiro, João Pedro played for the youth sides of Flamengo before moving abroad in January 2022, with Real Valladolid. After playing for the Juvenil team, he made his senior debut with the latter's reserves on 8 October of that year, coming on as a late substitute in a 3–2 Segunda Federación home win over Gimnástica de Torrelavega.

On 14 July 2023, João Pedro joined Cruzeiro, being initially assigned to the under-20 squad. He made his professional – and Série A – debut on 3 December, replacing Bruno Rodrigues late into a 0–0 away draw against Botafogo. He scored his first goal, as a professional, in Cruzeiro's 2-1 victory over Villa Nova, in a match valid for the 2024 State League.

== Career statistics ==
As of 5 February 2024

Club	Season	League			State League		Cup		Continental		Other		Total	
Club	Season	Division	Apps	Goals	Apps	Goals	Apps	Goals	Apps	Goals	Apps	Goals	Apps	Goals
Valladolid B	2022–23	Segunda Federación	16	0	—		—		—		—		16	0
Cruzeiro	2023	Série A	1	0	—		—		—		—		1	0
Cruzeiro	2024	Série A	0	0	3	2	0	0	—		—		3	2
Cruzeiro	Total		1	0	3	2	0	0	—		—		4	2
Career total			17	0	3	2	0	0	0	0	0	0	20	2
