= Ian Luccas =

Brazilian footballer (born 2003)

Personal information
- Full name: Ian Luccas Baroni Boetto
- Date of birth: 11 February 2003 (age 23)
- Place of birth: Ribeirão Preto, Brazil
- Height: 1.84 m (6 ft 0 in)
- Position: Midfielder

Team information
- Current team: Alverca
- Number: 25

Youth career
- 2014: Rio Preto
- 2015–2016: Palmeiras
- 2017: Portuguesa Santista
- 2018–2022: Ferroviária
- 2022: → Cruzeiro (loan)

Senior career*
Years	Team	Apps	(Gls)
2020–2023	Ferroviária	14	(1)
2023	→ Cruzeiro (loan)	9	(0)
2023–2026	Cruzeiro	19	(0)
2024	→ Goiás (loan)	13	(1)
2025	→ Ferroviária (loan)	33	(2)
2026	→ Athletic-MG (loan)	22	(4)
2026–	Alverca	5	(1)

International career^{‡}
2023	Brazil U20	1	(0)
- * Club domestic league appearances and goals as of 5 September 2026 ‡ National team caps and goals as of 14:59, 1 June 2023 (UTC)

Ian Luccas Baroni Boetto (born 11 February 2003), known as Ian Luccas, is a Brazilian professional footballer who plays as a midfielder for Primeira Liga club Alverca.

== Club career ==
=== Ferroviária ===
Ian Luccas was born in Ribeirão Preto, São Paulo, and joined Ferroviária's youth sides in 2018, after representing Portuguesa Santista, Palmeiras and Rio Preto. He made his first team debut with AFE on 14 October 2020, coming on as a late substitute for Fellipe Mateus in a 3–1 Série D home win over Cabofriense.

Ian Luccas scored his first senior goal on 28 August 2021, netting Ferroviária's second in a 2–1 home success over Caldense, also in the fourth division. He featured regularly for the side during the 2021 Série D, as the club narrowly missed out promotion.

=== Cruzeiro ===
On 16 August 2022, Ian Luccas moved to Cruzeiro on loan until July 2023, with a buyout clause; he was initially assigned to the under-20 side. Ahead of the 2023 season, he was promoted to the first team squad by head coach Paulo Pezzolano.

On 13 April 2023, Ian Luccas was bought outright by Cruzeiro, signing a contract until July 2027. He made his Série A debut on 25 June, replacing Machado in a 1–0 home win over São Paulo.

==== Goiás (loan) ====
On 27 February 2024, after losing space at Cruzeiro, Ian Luccas was loaned to Série B side Goiás until the end of the season. However, he was unable to establish himself as a regular starter for the side, only starting in two matches during his entire spell.

==== Return to Ferroviária (loan) ====
On 11 January 2025, Ian Luccas returned to his first club Ferroviária on loan until the end of the year. A regular starter in the Campeonato Paulista Série A2, he lost space in the Série B.

==== Athletic-MG (loan) ====
On 20 January 2026, Athletic-MG announced the signing of Ian Luccas on a one-year loan deal. A regular starter, he scored a brace in a 3–2 away loss to Internacional on 12 May; he continued his good form under head coach Alex in the following matches, featuring in a more offensive role.

=== Alverca ===
On 6 August 2026, Ian Luccas moved to Europe for the first time and signed with Alverca in the Portuguese top tier.

== International career ==
On 7 April 2023, Ian Luccas was called up to the Brazil national under-20 team.

== Career statistics ==
As of 15 June 2026

Club	Season	League			State League		Cup		Continental		Other		Total	
Club	Season	Division	Apps	Goals	Apps	Goals	Apps	Goals	Apps	Goals	Apps	Goals	Apps	Goals
Ferroviária	2020	Série D	1	0	0	0	0	0	—		10 (Note: Appearance(s) in Copa Paulista)	0	11	0
Ferroviária	2021	Série D	11	1	0	0	—		—		—		11	1
Ferroviária	2022	Série D	0	0	2	0	—		—		—		2	0
Ferroviária	Total		12	1	2	0	—		—		10	0	24	1
Cruzeiro	2023	Série A	14	0	9	0	0	0	—		—		23	0
Cruzeiro	2024	Série A	0	0	5	0	1	0	—		—		6	0
Cruzeiro	Total		14	0	14	0	1	0	—		—		29	0
Goiás (loan)	2024	Série B	12	1	1	0	—		—		2 (Note: Appearance(s) in Copa Verde)	0	15	1
Ferroviária (loan)	2025	Série B	18	0	15	2	—		—		—		33	2
Athletic-MG (loan)	2026	Série B	11	3	5	0	5	2	—		—		21	5
Career total			67	5	37	2	6	2	0	0	12	0	122	9
