= Pedro Oliveira (photographer) =

American photographer

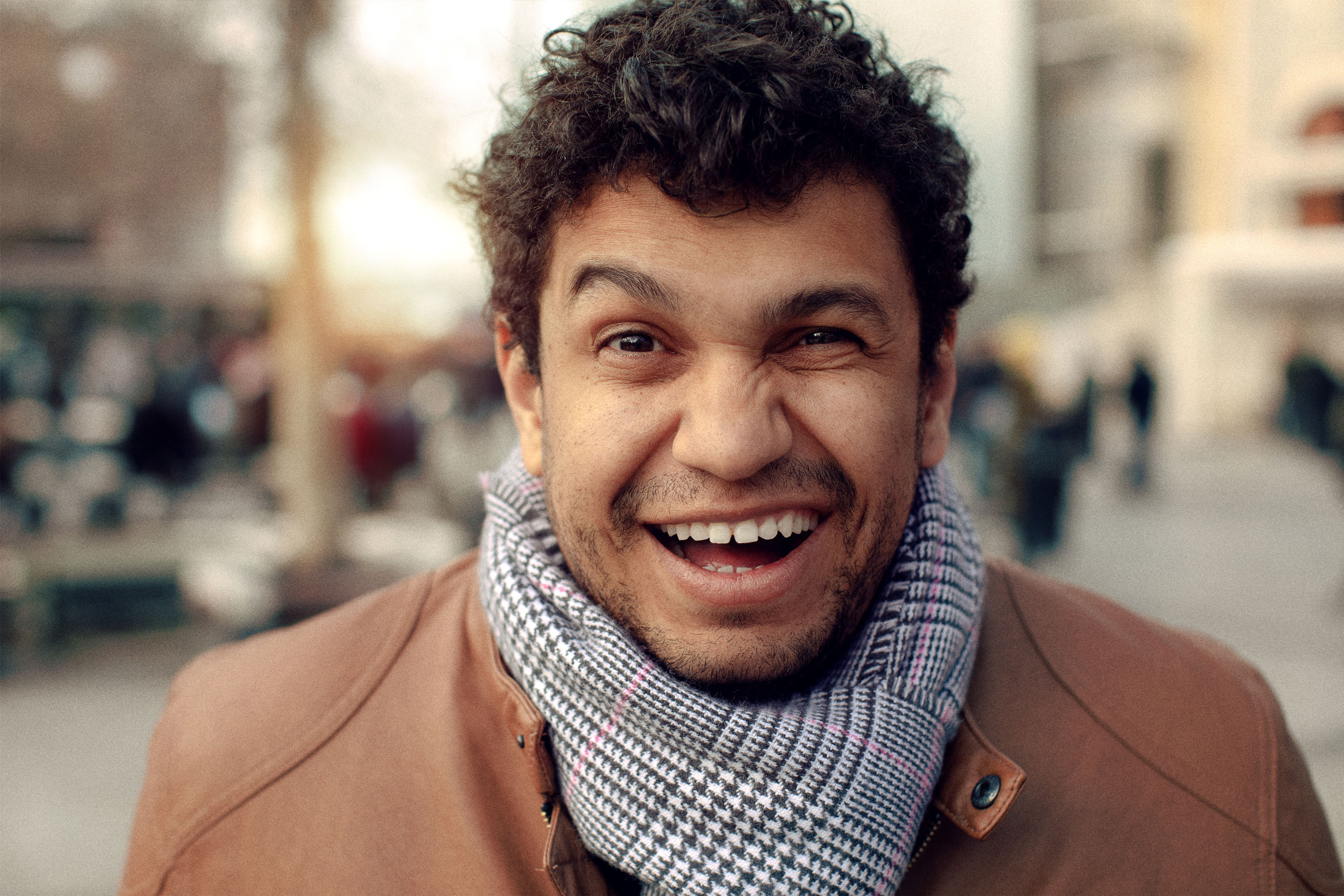
- Born: March 1989 (age 37); São Paulo, Brazil
- Occupation: Photographer

Pedro H. Oliveira Reis (born March 3, 1989) is an American professional photographer who resides in Portland, Oregon, and San Juan Capistrano, California.

Oliveira is best known for his series of portraits of homeless people around the world, named "Careful: Soul Inside", and for his photo essay with women over 50 years old, named "Beyond the 60th Sense". He has also had his work featured in places such as National Geographic, the musical Hamilton, Der Spiegel, and Die Presse, among others.

== Early life ==
Oliveira was born in São Paulo, Brazil, but lived most of his childhood in a small town, 200 miles away from the state's capital, named Pedro de Toledo.

Being the second of three children (Katerine and Priscila Oliveira) of Ivonete Borges Oliveira and Jose Eliezer Reis, Oliveira earned his first undergraduate degree in computer sciences at Universidade Nove de Julho. During his years in college, Oliveira was hired by IBM Brazil as an intern, and four months later was promoted to a database analyst.

After two years working for IBM, Oliveira decided to move to Atlanta, Georgia, United States to further his education. After nine months in Atlanta, Oliveira moved to Portland, Oregon, where he earned his bachelor's degree in Communication Studies from Portland State University.

== Career ==
=== "Careful: Soul Inside" ===
While in college, Oliveira was having difficulties adapting to the new city and to coping with the rough and constantly wet and cloud weather on the West Coast. Following a friend's suggestion, he purchased his first camera as a hobby to help him with his homesickness. During this period, Oliveira started photographing and reporting the encounters he would have with homeless people on his neighborhood.

After posting some of his images and stories on photographic communities, the "Careful: Soul Inside" gained overnight popularity, attracting attention from specialized art magazines such as My Modern Met and Petapixel. Eventually the project reached the mainstream media, receiving coverage from the Brazilian news conglomerate RecordTV, the Orange County Register, and local Portland outlets Street Roots and KGW News.

=== "Beyond the 60th Sense" ===
After finishing his "Careful: Soul Inside" project, Oliveira started a new series entitled "Beyond the 60th Sense".

During two years, he interviewed and photographed women from different backgrounds and socioeconomic classes, reporting their opinion on topics such as the correlation between age and beauty, sexuality, mental health, and body shaming, among others. As with his first project, "Beyond" was also first featured in specialized magazines before it was noticed by mainstream media outlets.

In an interview for The Oregonian, Oliveira said the series was inspired by the 2017 #MeToo movement, in which "brave women stood up for themselves and what they believed."

After receiving coverage in the German newspaper Der Spiegel, "Beyond" caught the attention of the traveling exhibition Body Worlds, and in March 2019 it became part of its exhibition at the Oregon Museum of Science and Industry (OMSI).

=== Other projects ===
Oliveira has also photographed a few other projects such as "Ribeira: A Brazil's Tale," which was featured on National Geographic (Traveler UK and the now-discontinued Yourshot).

He also produced a photo essays entitled "My Apologies Saudi Arabia," "Secret Kauai" (not yet published)., and "9 Under the 19," covering senior couples under the Coronavirus lockdown.
