= Jhosefer =

Brazilian footballer (born 2004)

Personal information
- Full name: Jhosefer Raphael Januário
- Date of birth: 9 March 2004 (age 22)
- Place of birth: Mariana, Brazil
- Position: Attacking midfielder

Team information
- Current team: América-MG

Youth career
- 2014–2024: Cruzeiro

Senior career*
Years	Team	Apps	(Gls)
2022–	Cruzeiro	4	(0)
2025–	→ América Mineiro (loan)	14	(0)
- * Club domestic league appearances and goals as of 17 December 2025

Jhosefer Raphael Januário (born 9 March 2004), simply known as Jhosefer, is a Brazilian footballer who plays as an attacking midfielder. He currently plays for América Mineiro, on loan from Cruzeiro.

== Career ==
Born in Mariana, Minas Gerais, Jhosefer joined Cruzeiro's youth sides in 2014, aged ten. In June 2021, he signed his first professional contract with the club.

Jhosefer made his first team debut on 13 March 2022, coming on as a second-half substitute for Daniel Júnior in a 5–1 Campeonato Mineiro home routing of Pouso Alegre. He featured in a further two matches in the season, but was mainly used in the under-20 team.

On 16 January 2024, Jhosefer signed a one-year contract extension with the Raposa. He made his Série A debut on 18 October, replacing Álvaro Barreal late into a 1–1 home draw against Bahia.

== Career statistics ==
As of 23 October 2024

Club	Season	League			State League		Cup		Continental		Other		Total	
Club	Season	Division	Apps	Goals	Apps	Goals	Apps	Goals	Apps	Goals	Apps	Goals	Apps	Goals
Cruzeiro	2022	Série B	1	0	2	0	0	0	—		—		3	0
Cruzeiro	2024	Série A	1	0	0	0	0	0	0	0	—		1	0
Career total			2	0	2	0	0	0	0	0	0	0	4	0
